= Bernie Houghton =

American businessman (1920–2000)

Maurice Bernard Houghton (1920, Texas – 2000) was an American businessman with links to the US intelligence community, including involvement in the CIA-connected Sydney, Australia-based Nugan Hand Bank in the 1970s. He settled in Sydney in 1967, and founded several bars in Kings Cross, New South Wales, becoming a significant enough local figure to have a bust erected in his honour in 2002.

== Career ==
After serving in the US military in World War II, Houghton had various jobs over the next 20 years (Alfred W. McCoy describes him as "knock[ing] about the country for twenty years in various jobs with no particular direction").

From 1964 to 1967 Houghton spent three years in Southeast Asia taking advantage of the business opportunities offered by the Vietnam War. Former US intelligence officers speaking to Jonathan Kwitny said that Houghton traded in many things, including slot machines and opium. Australia's Joint Task Force looking into the Nugan Hand Bank later reported that Houghton was "part of the intelligence community" at this time.

In 1967 Houghton moved to Australia, founding several bars in Kings Cross, New South Wales to take advantage of the $9 million a month trade of US servicemen taking rest and recreation from the Vietnam War; Houghton was said to have "reaped a good chunk" of this trade. His best-known establishment, the Bourbon & Beefsteak, survived until 2010. The Bourbon and Beefsteak was founded in October 1967, a month before the first US servicemen arrived, with the support of Australian property magnate Sir Paul Strasser. According to Alfred W. McCoy, Houghton's private guests at the Bourbon included Robert Askin and Abe Saffron as well as John D. Walker, the CIA's Australian station chief from 1973 to 1975. Houghton's connections to the intelligence community, whilst unclear, were strong enough that when he arrived in Australia in 1972 without a visa, he called the state director of the Australian Security Intelligence Organisation, who vouched for him to enable entry. He had previously obtained a security clearance from the ASIO in 1969. In 1972 Houghton also met Richard Secord, whom he would occasionally meet socially throughout the 1970s.

In 1975 Houghton flew to Washington, D.C., with two Nugan Hand Bank employees as part of supporting Michael Jon Hand's efforts to arrange arms deals supplying weapons to groups in southern Africa. As part of this venture Houghton made direct contact with Edwin P. Wilson, then working for the Office of Naval Intelligence. The same year Houghton worked with Wilson to supply Iran with a high-technology spy ship, working with "funds ... and ... payouts" according to a key federal witness against Wilson in his 1982 trial. Australian immigration records showed Houghton flying to Iran in March 1975 in the company of a US Army Colonel.

In 1976 Houghton began to take a more active role in Nugan Hand Bank, following the bankruptcy of his bar business with debts of nearly $1M. Houghton recruited "an old friend", US Admiral Earl P. Yates, to become president of the bank in early 1977. In late 1978 Houghton joined the bank's staff (having worked with the bank informally for the previous five years), and opened a bank branch in Saudi Arabia in January 1979. Here Houghton and his staff collected at least $5M in cash deposits from US expatriates, all of which disappeared with the bank's collapse in 1980. In 1979 Richard Secord introduced Houghton to Thomas G. Clines, leading to a deal with the support of Ted Shackley to sell Philippine jeeps to Egypt. According to witnesses speaking to Australian federal investigators, shortly after Frank Nugan's death in January 1980 Clines and Rafael Quintero went through a bag of Houghton's documents which he had left at Edwin P. Wilson's Geneva office aiming to keep Secord's name out of the investigation.

Houghton left Australia in mid-1980 (around the same time as Michael Jon Hand), accompanied by Clines, returning in October 1981 when it appeared that the investigations were unlikely to legally endanger him.

After Houghton's death in 2000, a plinth was erected in Sydney's Fitzroy Gardens in his honour in July 2002, with a sculpture of Houghton's head by a local artist. The move, partly in recognition of Houghton's circa $1.5M charitable donations, was approved by South Sydney Council. Its mayor at the time said that it was because of Bernie that the King's Cross community was "vibrant, alive, and so diverse".
