= United States espionage in Australia =

United States espionage in Australia refers to confirmed and alleged cases of espionage and political interference carried out in Australia by the United States.

== Cold War informants ==
A 2021 article by Australian historian C.J. Coventry outlined numerous people who had acted as informants for the US Embassy in Australia throughout the Cold War. People named as informants include:

- Arthur Calwell
- B.A. Santamaria
- Barrie Unsworth
- Bill Hayden
- Billy Snedden
- Bob Hawke
- Don Dunstan
- Don Willesee
- Owen Dixon
- Percy Clarey
- Peter Wilenski

Bob Carr has also been shown to be a US informant during this time.

== Nugan Hand Bank (1970s) ==
Between 1973 and 1980, the Nugan Hand Bank operated as a merchant bank in Australia. Founded by ex US Green Beret Michael Jon Hand and Australian lawyer Francis John Nugan. The bank has been repeatedly alleged to have been a CIA front organisation that laundered money and drugs and gave money to Australian politicians favourable to the United States.

== Whitlam dismissal (1975) ==
Numerous sources have alleged that the CIA was involved in the dismissal of Gough Whitlam. These allegations are often grounded in the idea that Whitlam was going to close Pine Gap, a key US intelligence base. The allegations also centre around Christopher John Boyce, a US citizen and defense industry contractor who worked at Pine Gap in the 1970s. Boyce has claimed that the CIA was involved in the Whitlam dismissal and was interfering in Australian politics, even claiming that the CIA had infiltrated Australian politics. Supporters of these allegations include journalist John Pilger, William Blum, Joan Coxsedge Jonathan Kwitny and Jordan Shanks. A long-running proponent of the conspiracy to remove Whitlam has been Humphrey McQueen, who sees the affair as entirely consistent with the preservation of capital within capitalism. Critical of the allegations include historian Peter Edwards and former chief of ASIO Edward Woodward.

== United States diplomatic cables leak (2010) ==
On the 28th of November 2010, WikiLeaks began releasing classified diplomatic cables that had been sent to the State Department by consulates, embassies and diplomatic missions from 1966 to 2010. The cables revealed a number of Labor politicians were "protected sources" for the US embassy in Australia.

- Bob McMullan
- Mark Arbib
- Michael Cooney
- Michael Danby
- Peter Khalil

This has contributed to allegations of US involvement in the 2010 Australian Labor Party leadership spill, which saw the replacement of Prime Minister Kevin Rudd with Julia Gillard. These allegations have been made by YouTuber Jordan Shanks and an article in Jacobin magazine. The cables were used by Clinton Fernandes in his controversial book What Uncle Sam Wants (2019) to show exactly how Australian foreign policy is workshopped by representatives of the United States, revealing the true nature of bilateral diplomacy. For example, the Rudd government assured the United States that it would not embarrass it on the issue of climate change.

== See also ==
- Foreign espionage in Australia
- Australia–United States relations
- Criticism of United States foreign policy
- Mass surveillance in Australia
- Julian Assange
- Foreign electoral intervention
- Chinese intelligence activity abroad#Australia
- Foreign espionage in New Zealand
