= TOPS Knives =

American Knife manufacturer company

TOPS Knives, Inc. is a tactical knife manufacturer located in Eastern Idaho, United States. The company was established in December 1998 and is owned and operated by Leo Espinoza. The company primarily produces fixed-blade knives for military and law enforcement.

The company made national and international news in 2015 when Australian investigative journalists revealed that TOPS Knives' co-founder and then-owner, Michael Jon Fuller, was Michael Jon Hand, an ex–Green Beret and banker who had disappeared in 1980 after the bank he co-founded, the Nugan Hand Bank, collapsed amidst allegations of supporting Central Intelligence Agency operations.

== History ==
TOPS Knives was created in December 1998. Several old friends from the Vietnam War era developed a concept based on their experience and disappointment with the knives they were issued during the war, and they sought to correct these issues of strength and durability. TOPS has manufactured their knives in Idaho since the company's establishment. TOPS Knives was founded by veterans and supports the Wounded Warrior Project and other charitable organizations.

TOPS Knives has over 200 knife models in production with many more that have are no longer made. One of the most well-known models is the Tom Brown Tracker Knife. It was designed by Tom Brown Jr. and was featured in the 2003 Hollywood movie The Hunted.

According to Idahoan and Australian investigative news teams, as of 2015, TOPS Knives was owned by its co-creator and former CEO, Michael Jon Fuller. Fuller, known previously as Michael Jon Hand, had disappeared in 1980 after the Nugan Hand Bank which he had co-founded collapsed amidst allegations of illegal activities and providing support for the U.S. Central Intelligence Agency. While TOPS Knives and Fuller admitted Fuller's past, they claimed Fuller had not gone into hiding but instead that Fuller left Australia due to death threats. In 2015, Australian television news program 60 Minutes tracked Fuller down in Idaho. Around the same time, Fuller had reportedly retired due to poor health, leaving Leo Espinoza at the head of TOPS Knives.

The company has collaborated with security consultant Ed Calderon in developing a knife, basing features on his experiences as a police officer in Mexico dealing in counter-narcotics and organized crime units.
