= Michael Jon Hand =

US Special Forces soldier and businessman

Michael Jon Hand (December 8, 1941 – November 7, 2020) was a US ex–Green Beret known for co-founding the Nugan Hand Bank which collapsed in sensational circumstances in 1980. He was more recently the owner of TOPS Knives.

== Career ==
Hand grew up in New York City, where he attended DeWitt Clinton High School. After graduation, he attended Syracuse University, completing a year long course in the State Ranger School. In May 1963, Hand enlisted in the United States Army, where he served in the Army Special Forces ("Green Berets"). After Special Forces training at Fort Bragg, Hand was posted to Vietnam, where he received a Purple Heart, a Silver Star, and the Distinguished Service Cross, the second highest military award in the United States. He received this for his actions on 9 June 1965 in defending the Special Forces camp at Dong Xoai against a Viet Cong attack during the Battle of Dong Xoai.

Hand then worked in Laos for the CIA under William Colby and alongside Thomas G. Clines. Reporter Jonathan Kwitny, who wrote extensively on the Nugan Hand Bank, cites a passport document in which Hand claimed to have left the army in May 1966, and from 1966–1967 "worked directly for the U.S. government." According to other unnamed sources cited by Kwitny, Hand helped train guerrilla forces in Laos and worked with the Air America crews that supplied them.

In September 1967, Hand moved to Australia, where he found work in real estate, selling development lots. He was a close associate of Bernie Houghton, the owner of the Bourbon & Beefsteak bar in Sydney's Kings Cross, a nightspot notorious for drug use. In 1969, Hand formed his own development company, which soon began doing business with Australian lawyer Francis John Nugan. In 1973, Hand and Nugan founded the Nugan Hand Bank, with Hand concentrating on the international side of the bank. In January 1975, Hand spent over a year in southern Africa seeking to arrange arms deals, at a time when the CIA was providing support to groups such as UNITA in Angola. Efforts to arrange deals included incorporating a company in Pretoria, South Africa, and sending Bernie Houghton with two Nugan Hand employees to the United States to meet Edwin P. Wilson.

Returning to Sydney in March 1976, Hand developed "a close business and social relationship with Murray Riley", a former policeman turned criminal patron of leading Australian criminals. Within a month of his arrival, Hand began transferring cash to Nugan Hand's Hong Kong branch on Riley's behalf. Australian police later concluded that "Throughout 1976 Hand was knowingly involved in drug activity with the 'Riley' group in that he permitted and even encouraged the use of Nugan Hand facilities for the movement of 'drug' money." Following the June 1976 incorporation of a bank branch in the Cayman Islands, Hand moved to Hong Kong in October 1976 to develop the international side of the bank, developing a network of 12 branches across three continents. In 1977-8, as the bank expanded dramatically, Houghton was able to use his connections to bring a range of US military and intelligence figures to the bank. This expansion and influx of links coincided with the collapse of the CIA-linked Castle Bank & Trust in the Bahamas. In August 1977, Hand moved from Hong Kong to Singapore, from where he managed Nugan Hand's international operations until its collapse in 1980.

Nugan Hand collapsed in January 1980 following the apparent suicide of Frank Nugan. Subsequently, Hand shredded many of Nugan Hand's remaining records from both the office and the home of Nugan. He then fled Australia under a false identity, that of a Sydney butcher named Alan Glenn Winter, on a flight to Fiji in late June 1981. Hand wore a false beard and mustache to look like Winter and obtained a passport after getting Winter's birth certificate and having two photos taken. After a week in Fiji, he made his way to Vancouver, British Columbia, and then on to New York City.

In March 1987, Theodore Shackley responded to an article in The New York Times about the Nugan Hand Bank scandal with a letter to the editor stating that the newspaper had incorrectly described his activities in a manner than served to negatively affect public confidence in the CIA. Shackley stated he had met Hand in the mid-1960s while employed by the CIA in Laos and once again in Washington D.C. after retirement, and denied involvement in the scandal stating: "I was in no way involved in establishing the Nugan Hand Bank. I never made or caused to be made any deposit into or withdrawal from that bank. No money over which I exercised any control was ever deposited in this bank."

News reports appeared in the 1980s that claimed Hand had been sighted in a number of different countries, but none of these were ever confirmed. In March 1991, the Australian magazine The Eye reported that Hand was living in the United States, giving an address and other details, but according to reporters following up on the story, Australian authorities indicated that there were no plans to pursue further actions against Hand.

In his 2015 book Merchants of Menace, Australian author Peter Butt identified Hand as living in the US under a new surname but with his original social security number. An Australian 60 Minutes news team, working with information provided by Butt, revealed Hand to be living under the name of Michael Jon Fuller in Idaho Falls, Idaho.

== Additional sources ==
- Kwitny, J. The Crimes of Patriots, a True Tale of Dope, Dirty Money, and the CIA; New York: W.W. Norton, 1987, ISBN 0-393-02387-7.
