= Contents of the United States diplomatic cables leak (Australia) =

Content from the United States diplomatic cables leak has depicted Australia and related subjects extensively. The leak, which began on 28 November 2010, occurred when the website of WikiLeaks — an international new media non-profit organisation that publishes submissions of otherwise unavailable documents from anonymous news sources and news leaks — started to publish classified documents of detailed correspondence — diplomatic cables — between the United States Department of State and its diplomatic missions around the world. WikiLeaks was releasing documents each day since the initial release date, but published the entire collection unredacted following the partially accidental publication of the passphrase to the symmetrically encrypted GPG file WikiLeaks had placed online and provided to The Guardian. The journalists had published the passphrase as the title of a chapter in a book on the process of investigating and publishing the stories believing that the encrypted file had only been provided to them with that passphrase and not realising the entire encrypted file was still online.

== Australia-China relations ==
During a meeting in March 2009, Kevin Rudd, Prime Minister of Australia, advised US Secretary of State Hillary Clinton to be in a position to use force against China "if everything goes wrong".

=== Taiwan and Tibet ===
During that same meeting, Rudd described to Clinton that China was "paranoid" about Taiwan and Tibet, characterised Chinese leaders as "sub-rational and deeply emotional" in their reactions to Taiwan, and stated that the goal of his plan for an "Asia-Pacific Community" was envisaged to weaken China's authority in the region and curb its dominance in regional diplomatic institutions.

== Torres Strait and the Great Barrier Reef ==
In October 2006, the government led by John Howard made it compulsory for vessels sailing in the narrow and hazardous Torres Strait to navigate using a pilot in order to reduce the risk of oil and chemical spills in the northern end of the Great Barrier Reef. Cables released by Wikileaks revealed that the Singaporean and United States governments protested about the compulsory pilotage requirement, but the Australian government initially maintained its position. The cables show that, in July 2008, the head of the Department of Foreign Affairs and Trade's international law branch told the US embassy in Canberra that "Australia recognises that it has not handled the Torres Strait pilotage issue particularly well" and that the government was willing "to explore ways to address US concerns". In August 2008, a secret compromise was agreed upon, under which the compulsory requirement for pilotage would remain, but in practice no penalties would be levied against ships that passed through the Torres Strait without a pilot if they did not call at an Australian port. This arrangement was formalised in April 2009 by the Australian Maritime Safety Authority.

== Political controversy ==
The cables revealed a number of Labor and National Party politicians were "protected sources" for the US embassy in Australia.

- Bob McMullan
- Mark Arbib
- Michael Cooney
- Michael Danby
- Peter Khalil
- Bill O'Chee

Australian Senator Don Farrell, a South Australian right-wing factional Labor powerbroker, said he believes that Julia Gillard, Prime Minister of Australia from 2010 to 2013, was gunning for the prime ministership a year before Rudd's personal support in the polls collapsed.

This has contributed to allegations of US involvement in the 2010 Australian Labor Party leadership spill, which saw the replacement of Prime Minister Kevin Rudd with Julia Gillard. These allegations have been made by YouTuber Jordan Shanks and an article in Jacobin magazine. The cables were used by Clinton Fernandes in his controversial book What Uncle Sam Wants (2019) to show exactly how Australian foreign policy is workshopped by representatives of the United States, revealing the true nature of bilateral diplomacy. For example, the Rudd government assured the United States that it would not embarrass it on the issue of climate change.

== War in Afghanistan ==
Rudd was critical of Australia's European allies in the Afghanistan campaign, accusing them of having "no common strategy for winning the war or winning the peace" and derided the contribution of France and Germany to the fight against the Taliban as "organising folk-dancing festivals".

A cable from October 2008 recorded Rudd telling a group of visiting U.S. congressmen that "the national security establishment in Australia was very pessimistic about the long-term prognosis for Afghanistan".

Australian special representative on Afghanistan and Pakistan, Ric Smith (a former secretary of the Australian Defence Department) described the mission in Afghanistan and Afghan government presence as a "wobbly three-legged stool". In December 2009 Smith questioned what the Australian Federal Police would be able to accomplish given the "train wreck" that they had to be given to work with in the Afghan National Police.

Australian officials who briefed the U.S. embassy hinted at clashes between officials and ministers over its "apparent lack of progress".

== Australia-United States relations ==
Australian Senator Mark Arbib (Australian Labor Party) was in regular contact with and acted as a 'protected' source and confidential contact for the U.S. government, providing inside information and commentary on the workings of the government and the Labor Party to officers at the U.S. Embassy, Canberra.

== Review of the Rudd government ==
A review of the first twelve months of the Rudd government in December 2008 by Robert McCallum, Jr., U.S. Ambassador to Australia:

- Comments that Rudd's diplomatic "missteps" largely arising from his propensity to make "snap announcements without consulting other countries or within the Australian government";
- Notes the government's "significant blunders" began when the then-foreign minister, Stephen Smith said in February 2008 that Australia would not support strategic dialogue between Australia, the U.S., Japan and India out of deference to China (David Pearl, a Treasury official on Smith's staff in 2004, told U.S. diplomats he was "very smart but intimidated both by the foreign policy issues themselves and the knowledge that PM Rudd is following them so closely"); and
- Refers to Rudd's "control freak" tendencies and "persistent criticism from senior civil servants, journalists and parliamentarians that Rudd is a micro-manager obsessed with managing the media cycle rather than engaging in collaborative decision making".

In November 2009, the U.S. embassy delivered another assessment that:

- Rudd dominated foreign-policy-decision making, "leaving his foreign minister to perform mundane, ceremonial duties and relegating the Department of Foreign Affairs and Trade to a backwater".
- "Other foreign diplomats, in private conversations with us, have noted how much DFAT seemed to be out of the loop," and that "The Israeli ambassador Yuval Rotem told us that senior DFAT officials are frank in asking him what Rudd is up to and admit they are out of the loop."

== Academic commentary ==
The cables were used by Clinton Fernandes in his controversial book What Uncle Sam Wants (2019) to show exactly how Australian foreign policy is workshopped by representatives of the United States, revealing the true nature of bilateral diplomacy. For example, the Rudd government assured the United States that it would not embarrass it on the issue of climate change.

== See also ==
- United States espionage in Australia
