= Alleged CIA involvement in the Whitlam dismissal =

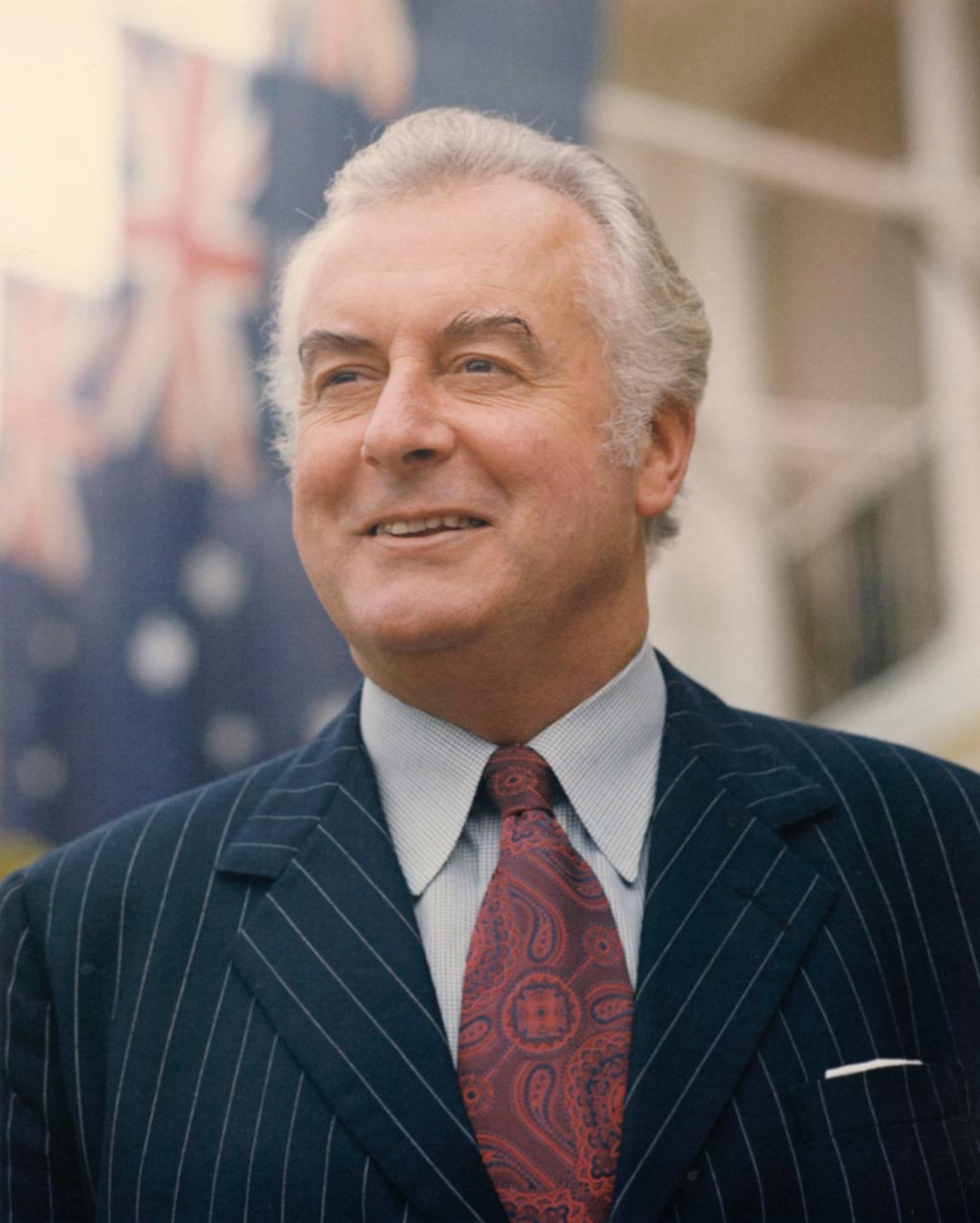
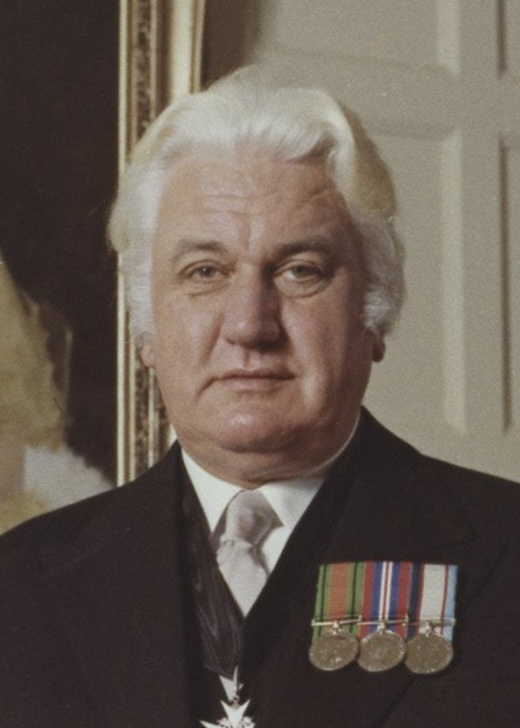
Australian Prime Minister Gough Whitlam (left) was dismissed by Governor-General John Kerr (right) amidst the 1975 Australian constitutional crisis. It has since been alleged the CIA was involved in the dismissal of Whitlam.

It is alleged that the United States Central Intelligence Agency (CIA) was involved with the events leading up to the 1975 Australian constitutional crisis, in which Prime Minister of Australia Gough Whitlam was dismissed by Governor-General of Australia John Kerr, who had several ties to the CIA and its predecessor.

CIA contractor and convicted Soviet spy Christopher John Boyce, several authors, including John Pilger, as well as some Australian politicians, allege that the CIA backed Kerr to dismiss Whitlam, due to Whitlam's perceived left-wing policies including Australian withdrawal from the Vietnam War, as well as his views on Australian sovereignty. His conflict with the CIA is alleged to have come to a head when he discovered several CIA-led operations occurring in Australia and overseas conducted by ASIO and ASIS, leading him to threaten cancellation of the lease on the Pine Gap facility, ending the US-led (nominally joint) operation, which was integral to the CIA's signals interception operations in the southern hemisphere.

Whitlam's threat to not renew the lease on the Pine Gap facility was allegedly seen by the CIA as compromising the integrity of intelligence operations pertaining to the satellite projects Rhyolite (subsequently Aquacade) and Argus (a proposed successor, later cancelled), used for monitoring and surveillance of missile launch sites in the Soviet Union and China, which were unknown to the Australian government at the time despite a blanket sharing agreement between the two countries.

Kerr denied any CIA involvement and Whitlam said Kerr did not need any encouragement from the CIA to sack him. Kerr allegedly maintained several links to CIA-funded organisations such as LawAsia and the magazine Quadrant, and was referred to as "Our Man" by the CIA according to whistle-blower and leaker Christopher John Boyce.

The action of an unelected representative sacking an elected prime minister and replacing them with a caretaker prime minister was referred to by Australian Labor Party and former Member of the House of Representatives Peter Staples as "the most blatant act of external interference in Australia's affairs and its autonomy as a nation and a democracy".

== Background ==
On 9 December 1966, the United States and Australia signed a treaty titled "Agreement between the Government of the Commonwealth of Australia and the Government of the United States of America relating to the Establishment of a Joint Defence Space Research Facility", which was signed by Australia's Paul Hasluck and America's Edwin M. Cronk, detailing that a facility would be established in Pine Gap, ran jointly between ARPA (US) and the Australian Department of Defence, and which was created ostensibly "a facility for general defence research in the space field", which would later be revealed by spy Christopher Boyce as a CIA satellite base, which operated as a relay for information from spy satellites under the programs named Rhyolite and Argus.

=== Pine Gap ===
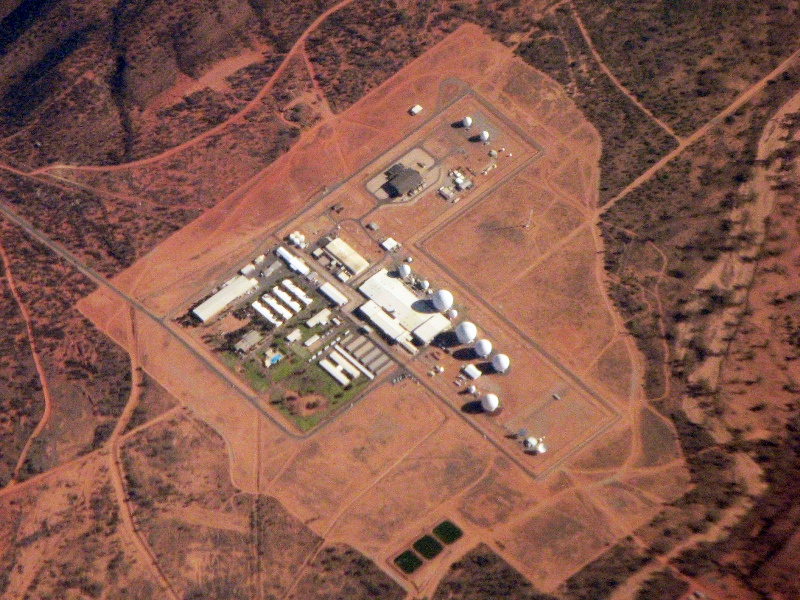
An aerial image of Pine Gap in 2008.

On 14 August 1968, the official newspaper of the Communist Party of Australia (The Tribune) posted an article which stated that without discussing with parliament, nor the people of Australia, the United States and the then-government of the Liberal Party had agreed to build Pine Gap. They also stated that questions had been put to the Australian government of Menzies several times but were evaded. The article, written by "Staff Correspondent" stated that Australians could make clear that their country was not to be used by the United States as a "forward outpost".

In December 1968, Dr Robert Cooksey, a lecturer in political science at Australian National University stated in The Australian Quarterly in December 1968 that the site was used not only for scientific research but as a "spy in the sky" for intercepting Soviet satellite communications and aiding The New York Times described this as speculation. He also stated that because of its role within, or as, an anti ballistic-missile (ABM) system, that Pine Gap as well as the US Navy communications base at North West Cape would be a priority target, and that the importance of such an issue was much greater than that of Vietnam because it was a matter of survival, threatening the "survival of peoples".

On 23 December 1968, The Canberra Times wrote a summary of an article stating that Cooksey had used technical journals on ballistic missile technology to inform his work, and that originally Pine Gap was conceived as an orbital bombardment system but was abandoned following the 27 January 1967 Outer Space Treaty signed between the USSR and the United States, prohibiting "plac[ing] nuclear weapons or other weapons of mass destruction in orbit or on celestial bodies or station[ing] them in outer space in any other manner".

The article written by Cooksey also stated that the United States wanted to have a means of firing ICBMs towards China, but that doing so was not possible using a north-polar route due to the fact the ICBMs would potentially fly over the USSR, risking conflict. The solution to this problem, according to Cooksey, was a south-polar route, however, such a route would sacrifice the accuracy of the missiles, and thus, the Pine Gap base, among others, was constructed to aid in targeting. The detection of missiles which were theorised to similarly pass over a south-polar route fired by the USSR would be detected by the base in Pine Gap and relayed to systems on Johnston Island (presumably Johnston Island Air Force Base).

The New York Times on 29 December 1968 also stated that the Financial Review paper made the statement that if the implications of Pine Gap being a spy base were true, that then effectively Australia would become part of the United States in matters of strategic defence.

=== 1969 Labor Party positions on Pine Gap ===
During 1969, the topic of Pine Gap was widely discussed among politicians, the public and the press in Australia, with most criticism of the base being around the secrecy, lack of transparency and the risk its perceived role as a spying station played in placing Australia at risk of nuclear attack from the Soviet Union or China based on its political alignment with the United States.

On 27 February 1969, Australian paper The Tribune reported on an exchange between Labor Party MP Jim Cairns and then-Defense Secretary Sir Allen Fairhall of the Australian Liberal Party, in which Cairns revealed in reports that the project would cost $225 million AUD (equivalent to A$3.03 billion in 2022).

Cairns also asked the secretary if he was aware that the site was being used for directing the launch of American nuclear missiles in the event of an attack on China, and for detection of any launches aimed at the United States. He concluded by surmising: "If this is so, would this not mean that Pine Gap would be a primary target in the event of a nuclear war?" Fairhall's response was that these were "wild guesses" and that he was frustrated that he could not provide him with a direct answer, although did not explain why.

The Tribune again reported on 7 March 1969 that Arthur Calwell of the Australian Labor Party had requested to be able to visit the facility at Pine Gap, along with Lance Barnard, which was refused by Fairhall, who stated "In the case of Pine Gap, there will be no facilities provided for inspection". The Tribune followed up reporting on Pine Gap on 21 May 1969, in which they stated that it was clear that the United States and the Australian government began the construction of a school at the premises which also doubled as a bomb shelter, stating "those in the know are obviously aware of Pine Gap as a potential target".

On 12 May 1969, The Canberra Times reported that Lance Barnard attacked the Liberal Party government for not allowing them to access Pine Gap, but that the facility was open for United States Senators to visit should they wish to do so. Barnard stated that "It seems the Russians know more about what is going on at Pine Gap than the people of this country". The paper concluded that the government had not revealed any further information about Pine Gap and that the revelations in the press were "speculations".

On 25 June 1969, Hal Alexander, writing for Australian Newspaper The Tribune, wrote that the Australian Labor Party Convention in South Australia steered clear of the issue of the "Secret Pine Gap Installation".

On 5 September 1969, the Papua New Guinea Post-Courier reported that newly elected opposition leader Gough Whitlam had visited Pine Gap for the second time, stating that he did not know what the facility was for, and that he would not be happy until all members of the opposition had visited it. He concluded by stating that if Labor came into the government, there were " 'some things' that the public should know about" the station.

=== 1972 Labor Party election victory ===
In 1972, Gough Whitlam, the leader of the Labor Party won an election with around 50% of the vote, defeating the Liberal/Country coalition leader and former prime minister William McMahon. He was described as being radical and a reformer, but was not a self-affirmed leftist, had several "run-ins" with leftist members of the Labor Party, but described as "an individualist of maximal proportions".

Previous governments had ruled on the basis of the policies of the Menzies government (1949–1966), which were heavily focused on conservative economics, trade and defence, which although popular in the 1950s and 1960s, had begun to lose popularity due to the re-emergence of "quality of life" issues, namely the quality of cities, schools and hospitals, which appealed to the baby boomer generation living in areas affected by these quality of life issues.

Previously, these "quality of life" issues were handled at the state level within Australia's governmental infrastructure, but Whitlam proposed that these should be handled by the federal Australian Government, acting under the Constitution of Australia. In addition to this, Whitlam's government was critical of the Australian involvement in the US-led Vietnam War, which led a significant amount of disaffection among the Australian population, and had by that point grown into widespread protests against the war, mirroring the public protests which were widespread in the United States against the war.

The conservative governments which had begun Australia's involvement in the Vietnam war and held a close relationship with the governments of the United States, which also led to disaffected segments of the population siding with the Labor Party. The liberal parties in Australia focused on the need to contain and limit communism, but did not completely withdraw troops from Vietnam, and opposition to relations with China.

In contrast, Whitlam's policies were perceived as radical, proposing (and later following up on) establishing Medibank to reduce healthcare premiums (which was later privatised), establishing the Australian Schools Commission and free tertiary education, establishing the landmark Aboriginal Land Rights Act 1976 (implemented after his tenure), no-fault divorce, maternity leave, preventing drilling in the great barrier reef, abolishing national conscription and removing the Australian Army Training Team from the Vietnam War, and establishing normalised diplomatic relations with China.

Pilger, along with Joan Coxsedge, Gerry Harant and Ken Coldicutt, credit Whitlam's victory to the fact that, at the time, fewer than 20% of the population of Australia was self-employed, with most Australians belonging to the working class despite efforts among academics to promote them to the middle class on the basis of home ownership.

Pilger describes Whitlam's oratory as being "inspiring, withering, ironic and funny" and as a "fine orator" when at his best, but at his worst "[went] on and on", but above all Whitlam was seen as a leader who stuck firmly to his principles. His campaign slogan, "It's Time" was broadly successful, along with the strategy of sitting back and letting their opponents make mistakes, and broadly opposing the draft for Vietnam. He was also supported by then owner of News Limited, Rupert Murdoch. His opponent, McMahon, after a protracted campaign against Whitlam was losing so resoundingly that Whitlam's own advisers urged him to stop joking about him as voters had begun to feel sorry for him.

Whitlam won the election with a popular vote of 3.2 million votes, 67 seats, and 49.58% of the vote, with McMahon's Liberal/Country Coalition retaining 58 seats but losing with 41.48% of the vote. This left Whitlam with a majority in the House of Representatives, but without control of the Senate which had previously been elected in half-elections in 1967 and 1970.

=== Whitlam's Labor Party in office (December 1972 - November 1975) ===
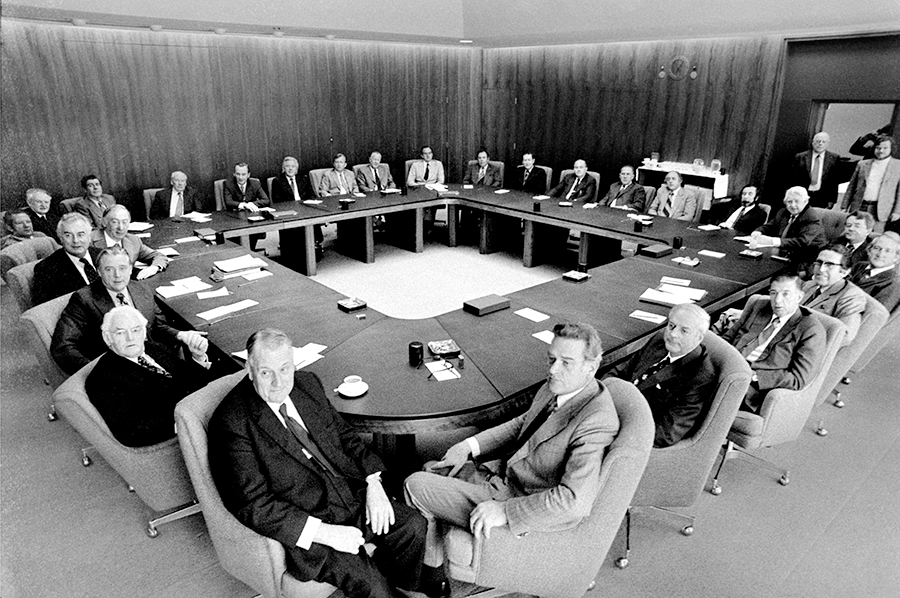
Members of the Third Whitlam Ministry in 1974

On 5 December 1972, the McMahon government dissolved, and an interim government was established from 5 to 19 December, formed of Whitlam, the leader of the Labor Party, and the deputy leader, Lance Barnard, who shared between them 27 positions in a duumvirate, due to complexities with the process of selecting ministers within the Labor Party's bylaws, Whitlam could only allocate positions, which he did to himself (13) and Barnard (14). This was later resolved by vote within the party on 18 December 1972, and the next day the duly elected ministers for each of the 27 positions were sworn in.

During the two weeks that Whitlam and Barnard held office, Whitlam sought to fulfil campaign promises that did not require legislation, and exercised the power it had at its disposal, effecting the immediate release of all draft resisters, removal of troops from Vietnam, and diplomatic recognition of China.

In his further time in office during his second ministry, he focused his efforts on implementing "The Program", a series of wide-reaching reforms to every area of government, such as, health, housing, and education and crucially even to the Monarchy; transferring many of these concerns from the state to the Australian Federal Government, and abolishing royal patronage, honorific titles. The name of the country was also renamed from The Commonwealth Government to The Government of Australia in line with a "patriotic image" of Australia, and its national anthem was changed

Whitlam's government raised reforms including:

- Establishment of Medibank, a public healthcare system (later privatised).
- Establishment of the Aboriginal Land Rights Act 1976 and the establishment of an elected National Aboriginal Consultative Committee.
- Establishment of the Department of Aboriginal Affairs, giving the Australian government responsibility to make laws for Aboriginal people
- Re-opened the embassy of Australia in Peking, resuming diplomatic relations with China after a pause of 24 years. (Whitlam made his state visit on 31 October 1973)
- Combination of several defence departments into a single agency
- Established a national Legal Aid office, and sister offices in each state capital.

These were also buttressed by reforms to laws including equal pay for women, increases in unemployment benefits and pensions, funding to the arts and incentives to bring creatives back to Australia.

=== Whitlam's Labor Party foreign policy and opinion of United States ===
In the realm of diplomacy and public affairs, Whitlam's government moved towards placing Australia within the Non-Aligned Movement, and expressed support for the Zone of peace in the Indian Ocean, which was opposed by the United States, and gave diplomatic recognition to China, Cuba, North Korea, and East Germany.

This approach was criticised by Suzanne Rutland in The Australian Journal of Jewish Studies as "moving from the United States' orbit towards that of the Communist and Third World powers", although Whitlam's approach towards the Palestinians was one of even-handedness, which infuriated Australian Jewish leaders, as the previous government positions as well as that of the United States was uniformly pro-Israel. Whitlam did not support recognition of Palestine.

Whitlam was also critical of the Nixon Administration's positions in Indo-China, particularly in Vietnam.

=== Further developments ===
There were a number of points of tension between Whitlam's government and the United States intelligence apparatus. Whitlam had some ties with the United States, in 1964 receiving a "Leader" travel grant from the U.S. Department of State to spend three months studying under U.S. government and military officials.

After coming to power, Whitlam quickly removed the last Australian troops from Vietnam. Whitlam government ministers, including Jim Cairns, Clyde Cameron and Tom Uren, criticised the US bombing of North Vietnam at the end of 1972. The US complained diplomatically about the criticism. In March 1973, US assistant secretary of State William Rogers told Richard Nixon that "the leftists [within the Labor Party would] try to throw overboard all military alliances and eject our highly classified US defence space installations from Australia".

In 1973, Whitlam ordered the Australian security organisation ASIS to close its operation in Chile, where it was working as a proxy for the CIA in opposition to Chile's president Salvador Allende.

Whitlam's attorney-general Lionel Murphy used the Australian Federal Police to conduct a raid on the headquarters of the Australian Security Intelligence Organisation (ASIO) in March 1973. CIA Chief of Counter-Intelligence, James Angleton, later said Murphy had "barged in and tried to destroy the delicate mechanism of internal security". Australian journalist Brian Toohey said that Angleton considered then Australian prime minister Gough Whitlam a "serious threat" to the US and was concerned after the 1973 raid on ASIO headquarters. In 1974, Angleton sought to instigate the removal of Whitlam from office by having CIA station chief in Canberra, John Walker, ask the director general of ASIO, Peter Barbour, to make a declaration that Whitlam had lied to the Parliament about the raid. Barbour considered the statement to be false and refused to make it.

Journalist Ray Aitchison wrote in his 1974 book, Looking at the Liberals, that the CIA offered the opposition Liberal and National unlimited funding to help them defeat Whitlam's Labor Party in the 1974 elections.

In 1974, Whitlam ordered the head of ASIO, Peter Barbour, to sever all ties with the CIA. Barbour ignored Whitlam's order and contact between Australian and US security agencies was driven underground. Whitlam later established a royal commission into intelligence and security.

In a statement to parliament on 3 April 1974, Whitlam said: "The Australian government takes the attitude that there should not be foreign military bases, stations, installations in Australia. We honour agreements covering existing stations. We do not favour the extension or prolongation of any of those existing ones." He also threatened not to renew the lease of the US spy base at Pine Gap, which was due to expire on 10 December 1975. The US was also concerned about Whitlam's intentions towards its spy base at Nurrungar. Whitlam also threatened to reveal the identities of CIA agents working in Australia.

Jim Cairns became deputy prime minister after the 1974 election. According to a senior US embassy official, he was viewed by US secretary of state Henry Kissinger and defence secretary James Schlesinger as "a radical with strong anti-American and pro-Chinese sympathies". The US administration was concerned that he would have access to classified United States intelligence.

Whitlam instantly dismissed ASIS Director-General Bill Robertson in 1975 after discovering ASIS, along with the CIA, had assisted the Timorese Democratic Union in an attempted coup against the Portuguese administration in Timor-Leste, without informing Whitlam's government.

In the second half of 1975, Whitlam learned of rumours that Richard Stallings, a former CIA head of Pine Gap, knew that the CIA had some involvement in Australian politics. In October 1975, Whitlam asked the Department of Foreign Affairs for a list of all declared CIA officials in Australia for the past 10 years, information to which he was entitled. When he saw that Stallings' name was not on the list, Whitlam asked Arthur Tange, head of the Department of Defence, what Stallings' role was and Tange reluctantly admitted Stallings worked for the CIA. According to Victor Marchetti, a former CIA employee, Stallings worked for the CIA's covert action division.

The head of the CIA's East Asia division, Ted Shackley, sent a telex message to ASIO on 8 November 1975, in which he threatened to cut off the intelligence relationship between Australia and the US unless ASIO provided a satisfactory explanation for Whitlam's comments on CIA activities in Australia.

=== "The Palace Papers" - John Kerr's private correspondence and response to public opinion on the sacking ===
In 2020, "The Palace Papers", copies of John Kerr's public correspondence, were published by several newspapers including The Guardian, which published full copies of the correspondence from and to John Kerr during the time of the Whitlam sacking, detailing what Kerr described as "rage" among the general population, and Kerr's opinions of journalists and Whitlam himself.

The papers detail that Kerr took the act upon himself to do, and did not inform Queen Elizabeth II until after Whitlam had been sacked. Whitlam stated when being sacked that he would contact the Queen, to which Kerr responded that he had already signed the papers for his dismissal and he was no longer Prime Minister, despite being elected by the people of Australia.

On 19 November, Menzies, Whitlam's opposition, wrote a letter to Kerr thanking him, and offering him "congratulations" and his "profound admiration" for sacking Whitlam, and earlier in his letter stating that Kerr's position ought to be proactive, and that he had done the right thing in sacking Whitlam, despite the "rage" which Kerr had previously mentioned among the public. Menzies was formerly the head of the party, which at the time of Whitlam's sacking, was blocking Whitlam's reform agenda, which later gave Kerr his mandate to sack him. Kerr later cited this, stating:

"There is a grey area, or twilight zone for personal discretion about the seriousness of the situation warranting a forced dissolution. Any people whose judgment I trust, including Sir Robert Menzies, agree that I really had no choice and that it was right to act." - Sir John Kerr, 11th November 1975 in correspondence with John Kerr

In a letter from 24 November 1975 to the private secretary Martin Charteris, Baron Charteris of Amisfield, Kerr noted that there was a particular feeling among the people of rage at his decision to sack Whitlam, and cited that he felt a majority of people supported his position, later citing a study of only swing voters. When mentioning the suggestion that he should face people who had demanded, he stated simply that he must remain silent, referring back to the article which was written about him by John Ashbolt calling him as "mad as George III". In a letter from 25 November 1975, to Queen Elizabeth II, in which he counsels Kerr on whether he should resign dependent upon "the feeling of the country", stating that the decision whether to reinstate Whitlam or appoint Fraser was his decision alone. He stated:

"If Mr. Whitlam is returned I concede that it may well be very difficult for you to work with him but if he is returned he ought to be extremely grateful and I suppose it is not impossible that his animus would be tempered in the flush of victory. May he not also see political advantage in appearing magnanimous in victory? It may be worth giving him the chance so to act. If you remain Governor-General or indeed, if you do not, you will be welcome here at any time that is convenient and practical for you to come. [...] The queen sends you both her very best wishes." - Martin Charteris, 25 November 1975 in correspondence with John Kerr

In a response to Charteris on 28 November 1975, Kerr responded that he felt that people who were unqualified to criticise him, and "unversed in constitutional law" had condemned him, stating that "Politics is politics and people are entitled to line up for whatever emotional reason appeals to them." He criticised Whitlam stating that Whitlam was making a "major thrust in the area of constitutional crisis" and that he had alleged a coup d'état or a putsch. He also stated that his postal mail was increasingly telling him to resign from his position, which he responded to by saying:

"The real point about all of this, I suppose, is whether a statement now to the effect that I have no intention of resigning whatever happens in the election could be regarded as too political." - John Kerr, 28 November 1975 in reply to Martin Charteris.

In a letter on 5 December 1975, Kerr wrote a letter to the private secretary, and also included a copy of an article written for the Australian Financial Review by Australian journalist Brian Toohey, titled "The Making of a Myth? The CIA And Whitlam's Dismissal", which he obliquely denied stating that the article "in an absurdly tenuous way [suggested] that the C.I.A conceivably might have been associated with events here", concluding that:

"At no stage in my military career, in the last war, nor before or since that time, have I ever had direct or indirect connections with Intelligence organisations". - John Kerr, 5 December 1975 in correspondence with Martin Charteris

The article was included in its entirety in the correspondence, with Kerr stating that it "repeated the assertion [...] that I have intelligence connections" and denying this, although the article itself did not accuse or outline any supposed connections, only that there were stories about them that could feed into the Labor Party's paranoia in some sections

== Allegations of CIA involvement ==
Prior to the Dismissal, Kerr requested and received a briefing from senior defence officials on a CIA threat to end intelligence co-operation with Australia. During the crisis, Whitlam alleged that Country Party leader Doug Anthony had close links to the CIA. In early November 1975, the Australian Financial Review wrote that Richard Lee Stallings, a former CIA officer, had been channelling money to Anthony, a friend and former landlord.

=== Kerr's involvement with CIA-linked groups ===
The most common allegation is that the CIA influenced Kerr's decision. Purported evidence for this assertion was later supplied in the book Killing Hope by William Blum, who elaborated on Kerr's involvement with CIA-linked front organisations such as the Western Europe chapter of the Congress for Cultural Freedom (Australian Association for Cultural Freedom), which was initially funded by the CIA, and to which he was appointed to the board of in 1957.

Reporter Jonathan Kwitny also goes further than Blum, stating that in 1944, Kerr worked with the Office of Strategic Services, which would later become the CIA in 1947. In the 1950s, Kerr was a member of the Australian Association for Cultural Freedom, which was exposed in 1967 by the U.S. Congress as being founded, funded, and "generally run" by the CIA. According to Obituaries Australia, an initiative of the National Centre of Biography at the Australian National University, Kerr was a board member of Association for Cultural Freedom, which it states along with LawAsia, were "clandestinely supported" by the CIA. Kerr was an author for its magazine Quadrant, for which he wrote the article "The struggle against communism in the trade unions: The legal aspect" in 1960.

Later in 1966, Kerr was one of the founders of Lawasia (Law Asia), which was funded by The Asia Foundation since its inaugural conference which itself was founded by the CIA. Kwitny, quoting former CIA officer Victor Marchetti, said that the Asia Foundation, its funder, "often served as a cover for clandestine operations [though] its main purpose was to promote the spread of ideas which were anti-communist and pro-American". Kwitny stated that the CIA paid for Kerr's travel and helped to build his prestige through Quadrant (although only one such publication is noted in said journal), and that noted that Kerr's biographer, Richard Hall, had written a book titled The Real John Kerr: His Brilliant Career, in which (Kwitny paraphrases):

[An] Australian colleague became nervous when the U.S. Congress exposed some of Kerr's sponsoring organisations as CIA fronts, but Kerr "brushed his worries aside". Kerr continued to go to the CIA for money

Kwitny also states that a former CIA analyst, Kevin Mulcahy, stated before his death that he "had been told of CIA complicity in the events of 1975" and said that a man named "Corley" was the one who had spearheaded the dismissal of Whitlam. Kwitny suggests that this man was Milton Corley Wonus, an expert on soviet ballistic missile and space programs.

=== Kerr's previous legal work ===
The initiative also cites an incident on 15 May 1969, mirroring the gravity and manner of the sacking of Whitlam in 1975. Kerr invoked long-disused penal powers under the Conciliation and Arbitration Act, which were used to imprison the Victorian State Secretary of the then Australian Tramway and Motor Omnibus Employees' Association, and communist, Clarrie O'Shea, for contempt of court for refusing to pay $8,100 AUD, fines which had accumulated since January 1966 due to Clarrie's fight for equal pay and recognition for female train workers.

The widespread anger which resulted from the jailing, resulted in a mass strike of over 1 million workers, which was finally resolved when Dudley MacDougall and Sydney lottery winner, a former advertising manager for the Australian Financial Review, acting on "behalf of a public benefactor", paid the union's fines. Elsewhere this has been stated as a person who won the New South Wales Lottery who paid the fines. Subsequently, O'Shea was released, and specifically stated that ASIO orchestrated his release with MacDougall being a cover due to them trying to prevent him from dying in jail and causing a subsequent riot.

=== Allegations of Australian Security Intelligence Service (ASIS) collaboration with the CIA ===
Pilger claims that while leader of the opposition and visiting then-Deputy Prime Minister of Malaysia, Abdul Razak Hussein, Whitlam was informed of the existence of ASIS, which was the counterpart to ASIO which conducted operations overseas, and claims that on two occasions, in Chile, they were discovered aiding the CIA in 'de-stabilising' the Allende government, and that Whitlam sacked the head of ASIS on the grounds of their secret involvement in operations in East Timor, and that the sackings of ASIS heads as well as transferring the head of ASIO contributed towards the sacking of Whitlam.

=== Other allegations of CIA involvement ===
Victor Marchetti, a CIA officer turned critic of the US intelligence community who had helped set up the Pine Gap facility, said that the threatened closure of US bases in Australia "caused apoplexy in the White House, [and] a kind of Chile [coup] was set in motion", with the CIA and MI6 working together to get rid of the prime minister. Jonathan Kwitny wrote in his book The Crimes of Patriots that the CIA "paid for Kerr's travel, built his prestige ... Kerr continued to go to the CIA for money".

In 1974, the White House chose Marshall Green as ambassador to Australia. John Pilger wrote that Green was known as "the coupmaster" for his role in the bloody overthrow of President Sukharno in Indonesia. Journalist Hamish McDonald wrote that "Green's postings tended to precede attempts to overthrow the host government".

== Leaks ==
=== 1974 Australian Security Intelligence Organisation (ASIO) leak ===
Former Aboriginal Affairs advisor for the Whitlam government and writer, Dick Hall, wrote in his book "The Secret State", that following on from Whitlam's refusal to vet his staff through the Australian Security Intelligence Organisation (ASIO), a CIA agent and US Embassy Political Officer stated "Your Prime Minister has just cut off one of his options", with Pilger referencing a 1988 interview of William Pinwill in the program "The Last Dream" that a CIA officer (Frank Snepp) had told him that the Australians "might as well be regarded as North Vietnamese collaborators".

An article titled "Cairns: ASIO's startling dossier" in Australian Periodical The Bulletin on 22 June 1974 published an article by reporter Peter Samuel which detailed that the reporter had been provided with a 12-page foolscap dossier on the then-Deputy Prime-Minister, Jim Cairns, written by the ASIO itself, an Australian intelligence organisation. The report, which had been produced in 1971, was based upon public works from Cairns, who the ASIO described in "ASIO's traditional right-wing standpoint" as wanting to work towards the destruction of the parliamentary system and bring about "anarchy and in due course, left-wing fascism [sic]".

The dossier also claimed that Cairns' wished for a populist, participatory democracy and aimed to bring about the downfall of the parliament through the use of student actions and non-violent political action, referring to the concept as "the supremacy of the will of the people", which it claimed was a re-formulation of the Communist Party of Australia's similar program to establish participatory democracy and worker control of industry through similar means, due to the fact that Cairns had contributed to the Australian Left Review in May 1971.

This claim was then further compounded by claims published in 1983 by Brian Toohey of the National Times, who published extracts from several thousand classified documents produced by ASIO in an article titled "How ASIO Betrayed Australia To The Americans", stating that ASIO gathered information about Australian politicians and senior officials that it saw as unfavourable, and handed them over to the CIA to later be used as ammunition against them.

=== 1982 Christopher John Boyce Telex leaks at TRW, Inc. ===
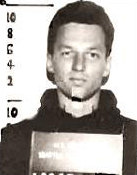
Mugshot of Christopher John Boyce, after having been arrested by the U.S. Marshals Service.

Later in 1970, allegations of CIA involvement were confirmed by Christopher John Boyce (later jailed for selling of documents to the Soviet Union) who revealed that, as a Telex Operator for TRW Inc., he had worked in a cryptographic communications centre which bridged communications between the CIA headquarters in Langley, Virginia, and the satellite communications network in Australia including Pine Gap. Kerr, who had physical access to misrouted Telex communications between the CIA in Langley and Australia which detailed efforts to remove Whitlam, with the CIA resident within the TRW secure area referring to him as "our man Kerr".

Boyce decided to sell documents to the Soviet Union after he initially saw Nixon's government "go down in flames", but stated his motivations went beyond that, and he saw the "general drift" of the United States government as "a threat to mankind", stating his opposition to the United States' use, stockpiling and testing of nuclear weapons, as well as the United States' early stockpiling of nuclear weapons which was later met after several decades of lagging behind the US by the USSR. He also stated that the US was to increase its stockpiles even after the USSR reached parity with them, although modern retrospective evidence on stockpiles shows this not to be the case.

Boyce had photographed the physical telex copies with these communications outside and inside of the TRW offices, smuggling them out in a satchel intended to make "beer runs" for the guards inside the TRW secure area, and then later sold them on to the USSR.

A subsequent interview to Australian TV program 60 Minutes detailed that TRW relayed messages between the United States and the Pine Gap facility in the northern territory in Australia. Boyce's lawyer Dougherty stated that Boyce's father had been an FBI agent and was involved with TRW, and through an "old boy network" had gotten him access to the job, and that there was no security whatsoever in the vault in TRW where the messages were relayed via Telex, including an unsecured telephone which Boyce could have used to communicate the telexes as they were received, although did not do so.

According to the documentary, the Australian government and the United States had an executive agreement to share the results from research programmes conducted by both countries due to the vital part the Pine Gap played on the part of the Australians, leading to the agreement being made in Canberra on 9 December 1966. Boyce had access to Telexes along with his accomplice, Andrew Daulton Lee, and had sold secrets about the Rylite and Argus satellite projects, which would detect launches and military bases and missile launches in the Soviet Union and China, which was not, according to Boyce, shared with Australia, with Boyce stating he was told directly by Rick Smith, Security Project Director and former CIA [employee]:

"When I went to work for the project, the initial security briefing that I had.. err, I was told that in fact we weren't willing to live up to that agreement, and we haven't been -- and that there was information which was being withheld, and that also the advanced Argus project, which was the advanced Rylite Project, was to be hidden from Australia"

When interviewed, Boyce stated that he was unaware of the extent to which the American bases in Australia were a hot-button political issue, but he noted that in the black vault, the secure area in TRW, there were conversations held among members of TRW security, stating that "Mr Whitlam was not a popular figure at all", stating that his politics was not favoured and that his inquiries about what was going on at the base (Pine Gap) were "compromising the integrity of the project". He stated "Mr Whitlam's government was a threat." and that there was a lot of celebration among the CIA after the sacking of Whitlam and his government by John Kerr.

The program also stated that 2 days before a Parliamentary debate was due in Australia on the Satellite bases which the United States had installed there stated that a Telex was received stating that Whitlam was in danger of "blowing the lid off Pine Gap", and the next day Whitlam was dismissed. Boyce stated that in addition to Whitlam's dismissal, the CIA had "hardware and software to ship out to Alice Springs", and that the strikes among airport staff had been suppressed by the CIA, paraphrasing a Telex he read which had said: "Pilot [codename for the CIA] will continue to suppress the strikes. Continue shipments on schedule".

=== 1975 Telex Leaks (Stallings affair) ===
On April 26 1977, leaked telexes between the CIA and ASIO on 10 November 1975, which were published by the Financial Review, which were verified as authentic by Whitlam and then entered into the Parliamentary record by Whitlam on 4 May 1977. Before entering them into the record, Whitlam stated:

We now know from the publication of a secret telex message from the Australian Security Intelligence Organisation representatives in Washington to the Director-General that Mr Richard Stallings who was in charge of the construction of a facility in Australia and was the first head of that facility, was not an employee of the Defence Department but of the Central Intelligence Agency. The published telex from ASIO in Washington is scandalous, not because the document was leaked, but because of its disclosures. It arrived on 10 November 1975. Its full text was published in the Australian Financial Review on 29 April and I can vouch for its authenticity. I seek leave to incorporate the text in Hansard.

The content of the telex was published by The Financial Review on 26 April 1977 and also published in full in Australian Hansard on 4 May 1977 by Whitlam. The contents of the Telex were:

TOP SECRET

Following message received from ASIO liaison officer Washington:

Begins:

For Director General.

On 8 November Chackley chief East Asia Division CIA requested me to pass the following message to DG (Director General).

On 2 November the PM of Australia made a statement at Alice Springs to the effect that the CIA had been funding Anthony's National Country Party in Australia.

On 4 November the U.S. Embassy in Australia approached the Australian Government at the highest level and categorically denied that CIA had given money to the National Country Party or its leader, nor any other U.S. Government agency had given or passed funds to an organisation or candidate for political office in Australia and to this effect was delivered to Roland at (DFA) Department of Foreign Affairs Canberra on 5 November.

On 6 November Asst Sec Edwards of U.S. State Department visiting DCM (Deputy Chief of Mission) at Australian Embassy in Washington and passed the same message that the CIA had not funded an Australian political party.

It was requested that this message be sent to Canberra. At this stage CIA was dealing only with the Stallings incident and was adopting a no comment attitude in the hope that the matter would be given little or no publicity.

Stallings is a retired CIA employee.

On November 6, the Prime Minister publicly repeated the allegation that he knew of two instances in which CIA money had been used to influence domestic Australian politics.

Simultaneously press coverage in Australia was such that a number of CIA members serving in Australia have been identified- Walker under State Department cover and Fitzwater and Bonin under Defence cover.

Now that there four persons have been publicised it is not possible for CIA to continue to deal with the matter on a no comment basis.

They have now had to confer with the cover agencies which have been saying that the persons concerned are in fact what they say they are, e.g. Defence Department saying that Stallings is a retired Defence Department employee.

On November 7, fifteen newspaper or wire service reps called the Pentagon seeking information on the allegations made in Australia.

CIA is perplexed at the point as to what all this means.

Does this signify some change in our bilateral intelligence security related fields.

CIA can not see how this dialogue with continued reference to CIA can do other than blow the lid off those installations in Australia where the persons concerned have been working and which are vital to both of our services and countries, particularly the installation at Alice Springs.

On November 7, at a press conference, Colby was asked whether the allegations made in Australia were true. He categorically denied them.

Congressman Otis Pike, chairman of the Congressional Committee inquiring into the CIA, has begun to make inquiries on this issue and has asked whether CIA has been funding Australian political parties.

This has been denied by the CIA rep in Canberra in putting the CIA position to relevant persons there.

However, CIA feels it necessary to speak also directly to ASIO because of the complexity of the problem.

Has ASIO HQ been contacted or involved?

CIA can understand a statement made in political debate but constant further unravelling worries them.

Is there a change in the Prime Minister's attitude in Australian policy in this field?

This message should be regarded as an official demarche on a service to service link.

It is a frank explanation of a problem seeking counsel on that problem. CIA feel that everything possible has been done on a diplomatic basis and now on an intelligence liaison link they feel that if this problem can not be solved they do not see how our mutually beneficial relationships are going to continue.

The CIA feels grave concern as to where this type of public discussion may lead.

The DG should be assured that CIA does not lightly adopt this attitude.

Your urgent advice would be appreciated as to the reply which should be made to CIA.

Ambassador is fully informed of this message.

== Subsequent evaluation ==
=== Supportive of the allegations ===
In 1977, United States Deputy Secretary of State Warren Christopher made a special trip to Sydney to meet with Whitlam and told him, on behalf of US president Jimmy Carter, of his willingness to work with whatever government Australians elected, and that the US would never again interfere with Australia's democratic processes. The use of the word "again" has been interpreted by some as evidence that the US encouraged, or actively intervened, in Whitlam's dismissal. Richard Butler, who was present at the meeting as Whitlam's principal private secretary, believed at the time, and remained convinced, that Christopher's wording was an admission that the US had intervened in Whitlam's dismissal.

William Blum wrote that the Nugan Hand Bank, which allegedly had connections to the CIA, allegedly transferred $2.4 million to the opposition Liberal Party of Australia. The CIA denied these allegations, stating that it "has not engaged in operations against the Australian Government, has no ties with Nugan Hand and does not involve itself in drug trafficking."

Several journalists, historians and political commentators have endorsed the theory that the CIA was involved in Whitlam's dismissal, including John Pilger, William Blum, Joan Coxsedge Jonathan Kwitny and Jordan Shanks.

=== Critical of the allegations ===
Kerr denied being involved with the CIA and there is no evidence for it in his private writings. Confidential correspondence between Kerr and the queen's private secretary, Sir Martin Charteris, released in July 2020 indicates that Kerr said that his alleged involvement with the CIA was "nonsense" and that he consistently reaffirmed his "continued loyalty" to the Crown. Whitlam later wrote that Kerr, "fascinated as he had long been with intelligence matters", did not need any encouragement from the CIA.

Edward Woodward, who was ASIO chief from 1976 and 1981, said that the US government and the CIA would have been happy for Whitlam to be dismissed, but that he did not see how the CIA could have communicated with Kerr, and believed Kerr would not have reacted favourably to a CIA request if it had been made.

In 2015, Australian diplomatic and military historian Peter Edwards dismissed the claim that Kerr's action was instigated by US and UK intelligence agencies, which he called an "enduring conspiracy theory".

== See also ==
- United States espionage in Australia
- United States involvement in regime change
- Palace letters

== Bibliography ==
- Blum, William (2014), Killing Hope: US Military and CIA Interventions Since World War II, Bloomsbury Academic, ISBN 978-1-7836-0177-6
- Coxsedge, Joan (2017). Nugan Hand: A Tale of Drugs, Dirty Money, the CIA and the Ousting of the Whitlam Government : an "unbank" and Its CIA Connections. Communist Party of Australia.
- Curran, James (5 November 2014). "Gough Whitlam's Pine Gap problem". www.ussc.edu.au.
- Kwitny, Jonathan (August 1987). The Crimes of Patriots: A True Tale of Dope, Dirty Money, and the CIA. W. W. Norton. ISBN 978-0-393-33665-8.
- Stanford, Jon (24 November 2023). "Covert forces and the overthrow of Edward Gough Whitlam: The Series". Pearls and Irritations.
- Stockwell, Stephen (25 September 2025). 1975: The Ballads of the Whitlam Dismissal. Tallebudgera Press. ISBN 978-0-6451848-4-6.
- Whitlam, Gough (1997), Abiding Interests, University of Queensland Press, ISBN 978-0-7022-2879-7
