= Aleksa Vulović =

Australian comedian and YouTube personality

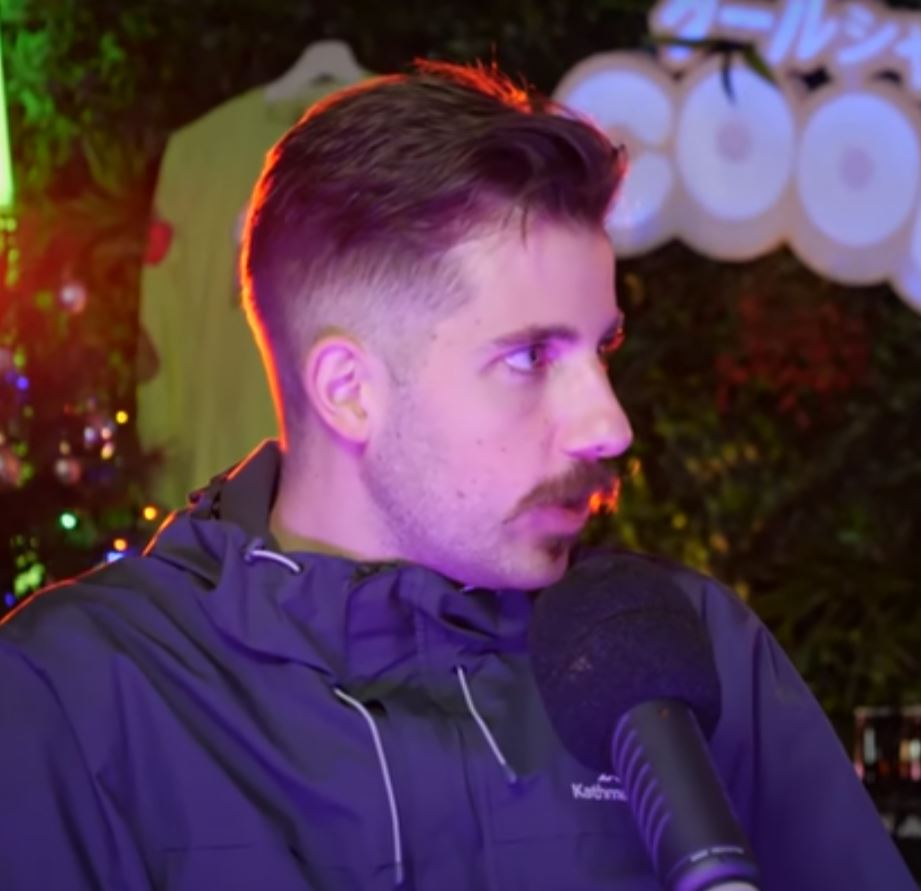
- Vulović in 2021
- Born: 29 October 1992 (age 34)
- Occupations: Comedian, YouTuber
- Known for: Boy Boy
- Notable work: The Haircut (2017), The Hooligans (2018)
- Television: The Chaser
- Relatives: Vesna Vulović (aunt), Ljubomir Vulović (great-grandfather)

Aleksa Vulović (born 29 October 1992) is a Serbian-Australian YouTube personality and online entertainer. Since beginning his public career, his videos have often gained widespread attention in Australian media. This includes his participation in the 2020 "Australian" Utah monolith, his journey to North Korea to get a haircut, and entering a casino after appearing dressed in a hospital gown and IV drip during the COVID-19 pandemic. Much of his work is made in collaboration with The Chaser. He has also worked with Aunty Donna.

Vulović is also the co-star of Boy Boy, alongside fellow comedian Alex Apollonov of the I Did a Thing YouTube channel. Apollonov and Vulović regularly collaborate on their respective projects and appear in each other's videos. Together with Apollonov, they have roughly 7 million subscribers and their videos have been viewed more than 761 million times.

== Early life ==
Vulović is originally from Belgrade. He was born intersex and received gender affirming surgery at age 13 after he developed an ovarian torsion. He worked on a PhD in international relations before Boy Boy became famous.

== YouTube career ==
=== Boy Boy (2016–present) ===
In 2016, Vulović and fellow comedian Apollonov founded the YouTube channel Boy Boy. Much of the content centered around myth-busting sensationalist claims in Australian media, while also using comedy to bring light to issues such as climate change, colonialism, police violence, and racism. Much of the content of the new channel was inspired by Louis Theroux and The Chaser's War on Everything. One video produced by the channel included Apollonov calling an Australian anti-terrorist hotline and reporting Vulović for wanting to join a violent militaristic organisation with ties to violence in the Middle East, which at the end of the video was revealed to be the Australian military. Due to Vulović living in Serbia for a year, Apollonov created a new channel in 2018 called I Did a Thing, which Vulović often appears on. In 2020, Vulović and Apollonov returned to uploading on Boy Boy, which reached 1 million subscribers by 2024. They also began regularly streaming on Twitch.

Together Vulović and Apollonov have collaborated on numerous projects, including mounting a machinegun onto a robotic dog, training wild lizards to hunt cockroaches in people's homes, using rockets to plant trees, sneaking into an arms dealing conference, and crafting a flamethrower from trash.

==== The Haircut (2017) ====
The short documentary-style movie titled The Haircut (2017) was the most successful comedic project produced by the Boy Boy channel and would gain widespread coverage from Australian media which would help launch Vulović's career as a professional comedian. In the movie, Vulović and Apollonov both travelled to North Korea to investigate dubious claims in Western media that North Koreans were either forced to cut their hair like Kim Jong-un or that their government orders which hairstyles their citizens are allowed to have. During their investigation, neither Vulović nor Apollonov could find any evidence to support the claims of government-mandated hairstyles and came to the conclusion that these stories were most likely fake. "When we started to look into some of those media stories we found out that a lot of them weren't true." Apollonov further described his opinions on Australian/United States relations with the DPRK, saying that "North Korea has tested four [nukes], and that is very scary… but imagine how scary it is for them to think that the US alone has tested 1,032 nukes? … We've used ours… against real people." Vulović shared Apollonov's opinions, saying that "What the haircut law and all these other 'amazing' stories share in common is at the very centre of this media whirlwind, they are based on absolutely nothing."

==== The Hooligans (2018) ====
To investigate news of violence among Russian football hooligans, Vulović and Apollonov both travelled to Russia together to interview fans of various Russian football clubs and embedded themselves within groups accused of hooligan violence. Apollonov said that his reasoning for creating this short documentary was that "As a film maker I'd never miss the opportunity to film my mate (Vulović) getting beaten up overseas."

==== Monolith project (2020) ====
In 2020, a mysterious metal monolith of unknown origin appeared in Utah, dubbed the Utah monolith. As more of these monoliths appeared across the globe in England, Romania and the Netherlands, Vulović and Apollonov teamed up with Australian comedy group Aunty Donna to create their own metal monolith which they planted in Australia. The monolith was planted outside Melbourne, Australia. Aunty Donna jokingly said that their monolith and the collaboration with 'I did a thing' was to promote their upcoming Netflix show.

==== COVID Casino stunt (2021) ====
During the COVID-19 pandemic, Vulović and Apollonov partnered with The Chaser to create a comedic investigation where they attempted to enter the Star Casino in Sydney while displaying as many symptoms of Covid as possible to see whether they would be allowed inside during the pandemic. In one attempt, Vulović tried entering the casino while dressed in hospital surgical garbs, dragging an IV drip stand on wheels, with a high forehead temperature. Despite telling the casino staff that he had come straight from a nearby hospital, he was allowed to enter the casino where he spent his time using the gaming machines while wearing a white shirt saying "I have covid" in bold black letters. "When I rocked up with my hospital gown and drip, the first thing they asked me was whether I had a Star Casino gold membership card." Apollonov followed Vulović into the casino with a forehead temperature of 48 degrees (achieved using heat packs), which the staff detected with a temperature gun and was still allowed entry to the casino. "My head was still really hot after I got inside," said Apollonov. "I must have drunk 3 or 4 of their complimentary water bottles. They're obviously very used to catering for sick customers." When asked about possible legal repercussions over their comedic stunt, Vulović replied "There's no point suing us, we already lost all our savings on big wheel during our filming breaks." Vulović and Apollonov were subsequently given life bans from entering casinos operated by Star Entertainment Group.

==== Pine Gap (2024) ====
On 6 March 2024, Vulović, Apollonov and Jordan Shanks attempted to enter Pine Gap, an American intelligence base near Alice Springs. The trio were briefly detained and questioned at the front gate after being denied entry and were later questioned upon arrival at Sydney Airport the next day by the Australian Federal Police. The video also featured an interview with Donna Mulhearn, a member of the Christians Against All Terrorism who attempted to enter the facility in 2006, and had accusations of CIA involvement in dismissal of Prime Minister, Gough Whitlam.

== See also ==
- Socialism in Australia

== Sources ==
- Daily Dose of Boy Boy (11 August 2024). "Political Assassination Tier List!! | Boy Boy Play". YouTube.
