= Michael Rudy Tham =

Michael Rudolph Tham (May 30, 1923 – October 5, 1998), sometimes known as Rudy Michael Tham or Rudy Tham, was a San Francisco Teamsters Union leader with alleged mafia connections.

== Early life ==
Tham was born in May 1923. He was a native of California, and an accomplished boxer who won an amateur welterweight title in 1941.

During World War II, Tham sailed the world as a merchant marine, before returning to the Bay area to join the International Brotherhood of Teamsters in 1946.

== International Brotherhood of Teamsters ==
Tham began life in the Teamsters as an organiser of wholesale grocery sales workers, going on to found the Freight Checkers, Clerical Employees and Helpers Local 856 in San Francisco in 1949. Local 856 went on to become, under Tham, the first San Francisco Union since the 1930s to sign contracts in Chinatown, and went on to have thousands of members.

== San Francisco Fire Commission ==
In 1966, Mayor John Shelley appointed Tham to the San Francisco Fire Commission. He was reappointed to this position in 1970 by Mayor Joseph Alioto and, again, in 1974.

== Allegations of organised crime influence ==
Throughout his career, Tham was dogged by allegations of misconduct. Numerous accounts also say that he was associated with James Fratianno, a known Mafia member. Fratianno claimed that he had an interest in a union dental plan being organised by Tham and himself. If successful, Fratianno said, he would collect $10,000 a month from dentists' kickbacks and "phony" medical claims.

=== 1972 ===
In 1972, Tham was charged with conspiring with "convicted labor racketeer Anthony DiLorenzo to extort a $190,000 contract from a national air freight company by calling a Teamsters Union strike." However, the case was dismissed due to the Justice Department's delay in bringing the case to trial.

=== 1979 ===
Tham was indicted in 1979 on federal charges of "embezzling $2,790 in union funds and causing false entries to be made in union records." He was convicted and sentenced for 6 months prison, and fined $50,000. Tham appealed, but lost.

=== 1989 ===
In 1989, Tham was indicted, along with Abe Chalupowitz (also known as Abe Chapman), a self-described "mob assassin of the 1930s" and convicted drug dealer, and Federal District Court Judge, Robert Aguilar, on racketeering charges. It was alleged that, on behalf of Mr. Tham, Judge Aguilar attempted to influence another Federal District Court Judge, Judge Stanley A. Weigel, "who was hearing the probation violation case against Mr. Tham" the prior year concerning a 1980 embezzlement conviction.

Tham appealed, but again, lost.

== International connections ==
Tham was also known to have dealings with overseas criminals. In a 1979 Australian news article, for example, it was found that Tham had dealings with Australian underworld figures such as Murray Riley and businessman, and convicted drug producer, Bela Csidei.

In 1975, Mr. Tham, it is alleged, was helping Australians, including Riley, with negotiating a take-over of the Howard Johnson casino in Las Vegas.

On another occasion, Tham was photographed in San Francisco with Csidei together with Jimmy Fratianno. Prior to this, Tham visited Australia in 1974 and, according to the National Times, "contacted New South Wales organised crime figures."

In the case of US v Mangano and Gavarenti (July 1982), Fratianno gave evidence stating that Tham had introduced him to the Australian, Sir Peter Abeles, director of Thomas Nationwide Transport. In the 1970s TNTs US operations were besieged by a number of "strikes, shootings and bombings." Once Tham intervened, these stopped.

Former Australian Prime Minister Bob Hawke acknowledged that in 1978, through Tham, he met with Sal Amarena, a mafia associate, in what Mr Hawke described as an incidental meeting. Mr Hawke, then President of the Australian Council of Trade Unions, was en route to Vancouver to attend a conference of the Socialist International congress and had a stop-over in San Francisco.
