= Nugan Hand Bank =

Australian merchant bank

- Industry: Merchant banking
- Founded: 1973; 53 years ago in Sydney, New South Wales, Australia
- Founders: Francis John Nugan; Michael Jon Hand; John Needham
- Defunct: 1980
- Fate: Insolvency
- Headquarters: Sydney, New South Wales, Australia
- Area served: Worldwide

Nugan Hand Bank was an Australian merchant bank that collapsed in 1980 after the suicide of one of its founders, Australian lawyer Francis John Nugan, resulting in a major scandal. News stories suggested that the bank had been involved in illegal activities, including drug smuggling, arms deals, and providing a front for the United States Central Intelligence Agency. Speculation grew when it became known that the bank had employed a number of retired United States military and intelligence officers, including former CIA director William Colby.

Investors' losses and the speculation surrounding the bank's activities led to three major government investigations over the next five years. The bank's co-founder, American Michael Jon Hand, and two other bank employees were indicted for conspiring to pervert the course of justice by destroying or removing bank records. Hand fled overseas in June 1980. In 1985, a Royal Commission of Inquiry found that while the bank had committed numerous violations of banking laws, the allegations of drug-smuggling, arms dealing and involvement in CIA activities were not proven.

== Founding ==
Nugan Hand Ltd. was founded in Sydney in 1973 by Australian lawyer Francis John "Frank" Nugan and former U.S. Green Beret Michael Jon "Mike" Hand. According to writer Alfred W. McCoy, the bank was formed with a fraudulent claim of $1m in share capital: "With only $80 in the company's bank account and just $5 in paid-up capital, Frank Nugan wrote his own company a personal check for $980,000 to purchase 490,000 shares of its stock. He then covered his massive overdraft by writing himself a company check for the same amount." Kings Cross restaurateur Bernie Houghton was also involved in the bank from the beginning.

The Nugan Hand Bank attracted investors with promises of up to 16% interest rates on their deposits and assurances of anonymity, tax-free accounts, specialist investment assistance, along with more surreptitious services such as money laundering. Nugan Hand rapidly gained business and expanded its offices from a single Sydney office to a global network that included branches (registered in the Cayman Islands) in Chiang Mai, Manila, Hawaii, Singapore, Hong Kong, Taiwan, Cayman Islands and Washington, D.C.

According to a former employee speaking in 1980, the bank paid commission of up to 2.5% on unsecured investments of $1m or more, when the going rate was around 0.25%. Together with related costs, the bank was paying over 12% to access funds. Yet the bank never became involved in traditional merchant banking activities like equity investment or mortgage financing; instead, its principals sought all manner of unconventional investment opportunities, including gun running (allegedly) and attempts to corner various commodities markets, such as Malaysian rubber and Indonesian oil. Its Cayman Islands subsidiary also provided tax avoidance and evasion schemes.

The Nugan Hand Bank gained respectability by the recruitment of a number of retired senior U.S. military and intelligence personnel, such as former Rear Admiral Earl P. Yates as bank president and ex-CIA head William Colby as legal counsel.

Australian trucking magnate Peter Abeles was also connected with the bank.

Bernie Houghton became the bank's Saudi Arabian representative; but eventually had to flee that country in a hail of bullets, as depositors sought to recover their money.

Michael Hand had formed a close business and social relationship with former Sydney police constable and underworld "patron", Murray Stewart Riley. From April 1976, Hand initiated five cash transfers totalling $295,000 to the Hong Kong office. Riley's subordinates used these funds to buy heroin that was then shipped to Australia. Upon Riley's advice, Hand opened branches in Thailand "to attract drug money" and two years later, ordered the destruction of all incriminating records relating to Riley's money transfers.

== Scandal and collapse ==
The bank's collapse was precipitated by the death of its founder Frank Nugan in the early hours of 27 January 1980. Nugan, who was facing charges of stock fraud, was found shot dead by a .30-calibre rifle in his Mercedes-Benz outside Lithgow, New South Wales. An inquest later returned a verdict of suicide. However, questions remain unanswered in regard to the lack of fingerprints on the weapon and the probability that the police who found Nugan had prior knowledge of his death.

Suspicions about the bank's activities grew in subsequent days as details of the contents of Nugan's car emerged. Of special interest was the business card of William Colby. Furthermore, Nugan's office had been ransacked, and Hand and Yates had ordered important company files destroyed or hidden elsewhere. Peter Butt states that Brian Alexander, who was on bail facing charges related to the Mr Asia drug syndicate, accompanied investigators when they searched the deceased Nugan's home. During the search, the investigators were interrupted by police officers who were responding to an anonymous phone caller who had claimed that police were in trouble at the residence. As a result, Alexander roamed freely and had the opportunity to remove incriminating documents.

The official inquest into Nugan's death in April 1980 made front-page news, amid testimony from Hand that Nugan Hand was insolvent, owing at least A$50 million, and as much as hundreds of millions, including $20,000 rent on its Sydney headquarters.

After destroying many of Nugan Hand's records, Hand fled Australia under a false identity in June 1980.

== Investigations ==
Three major government investigations issued reports devoted to the activities of Nugan Hand. Two of these were from bodies specifically created to examine the scandal: the first, the Commonwealth-New South Wales Joint Task on Drug Trafficking, consisted of investigators from federal and state government, and lasted from 1980 to 1983; the second, the Royal Commission of Inquiry into the Activities of the Nugan Hand Group, was headed by Donald G. Stewart, and lasted from 1983 to 1985. In addition, the Corporate Affairs Commission of New South Wales, a state level organ charged with regular oversight of business activities in New South Wales, began looking into the bank almost immediately after Nugan's suicide and issued seven interim reports from 1980 until 1983, when it completed its investigation.

A report by the New South Wales Corporate Affairs Committee linked former Philippine president Ferdinand Marcos to the bank. Melbourne and Manila businessman Ludwig Petre Rocka had an account at the bank, as did his wife Elizabeth E. Marcos, sister of Ferdinand. Rocka had helped set up the Manila branch of Nugan Hand and had his Manila office (International Development & Planning Corporation) in the same office as the bank.

The Royal Commission found that the Nugan Hand Bank was implicated in money-laundering, illegal tax avoidance schemes, and widespread violations of banking laws. One witness, a former Nugan Hand director, stated that Hand threatened bank executives: "If we didn't do what we were told, and things weren't handled properly, our wives would be cut into pieces and put in boxes and sent back to us". However, the Royal Commission did not find credible evidence of drug-smuggling, arms dealing, and CIA involvement.

The Royal Commission found that suggestions of "CIA connections" were widespread, stretching back to an apparent confirmation by a Taiwanese general in 1978. However, the Commission argued there was a lack of specific allegations, let alone evidence to substantiate them. The Commission argued that the CIA would "shy away from having anything at all to do" with such a badly run bank. The Commission dismissed claims that Houghton was a CIA agent, and that the bank was disseminating money for the CIA. The Commission accepted Colby's evidence that he was merely giving legal advice to Nugan and Hand relating to either or both of them taking up residence in the United States.

The Commission concluded that Yates, who had apparently been recruited by Hand, was responsible for the involvement of other retired military and intelligence personnel. According to the commission, Hand believed they would instil confidence in the bank, and their knowledge of South East Asia would be advantageous. Stewart later commented that the involvement of these figures gave the impression that the bank had connections that it did not actually have. Apart from the bank accepting deposits with no questions asked, the Royal Commission found no credible evidence of involvement in the drug trade. However, Stewart stated in his memoirs that he had "no doubt" that Houghton, Nugan, and Hand played a part in drug trafficking at Houghton's Kings Cross establishments.

The Royal Commission's findings conflict with the findings of the 1982 NSW Joint Task Force on Drug Trafficking which found that Hand had encouraged Murray Riley and his associates to use Nugan Hand facilities to move drug money. Task Force investigator, Clive Small, concludes that the Stewart Royal Commission was a whitewash:

The royal commission was so dismissive of an American connection that many people who read it simply felt that it was a cover up, because it was in effect so superficial and so dismissive. It never attempted to put into context its findings with the findings of the Joint Task Force, which have not been found to be in any way, shape or form inaccurate or unreliable.

== Allegations of CIA involvement ==
Politician and judge, John Dowd, stated that Nugan Hand became the vehicle to quietly move drug industry money. Dowd said that this led to dealing with corrupt governments and the CIA, but in Australia during the 1970–1980s, the CIA was seen as "the good guys". Similarly, former NSW Attorney General, Frank Walker, insisted that from the government's perspective, having good relations between ASIO and the CIA was more important than bringing criminals to justice.

Investigative authors, Kwitney J. (1987) and McCoy A.W. (1991) asserted that Nugan Hand Bank had facilitated the international movement of illegal funds for both drug smugglers and the CIA. The Stewart Royal Commission's decision that there was no evidence to support these allegations astonished these early investigators.

Revelations by the American defence industry employee, Christopher Boyce, initiated speculation that the CIA and Nugan Hand had also played some part in the dismissal of Australian Prime Minister, Gough Whitlam. For instance, William Blum (1999) states inter alia, that the bank allegedly transferred $2.4 million to the Liberal Party of Australia which contested two forced elections in 1974 and 1975 to oust Whitlam's Labor government. He also states that the Governor General, Sir John Kerr, who was instrumental to the dismissal, was referred to by the CIA as "our man". The CIA responded to these allegations with an emphatic denial: "The CIA has not engaged in operations against the Australian Government, has no ties with Nugan Hand and does not involve itself in drug trafficking".

Cooperation from the American agencies did not extend to other Australian investigators. NSW Corporate Affairs investigators, Geoffrey Nicholson and Rick Porter, in association with the Nugan Hand liquidator, John O'Brien, requested documents from the FBI and also the CIA. They received documents from both agencies that were so heavily redacted that they were useless. Joint Task Force investigators also made requests through ASIO to the CIA asking for information. Inexplicably, the requests were never passed on by ASIO.

In 1981, Prime Minister Malcolm Fraser, who had hoped the Nugan Hand controversy would fade away, stood before the parliament and told the Australian public that the CIA had no interest in the bank. However, Fraser's assurances were challenged by journalist, Brian Toohey, who wrote that a former CIA agent had told him that Patry E Loomis had worked for the CIA and allegedly arranged for huge sums of money to pass through Nugan Hand for various intelligence operations around the world. Details in Seymour Hersh's 1981 article 'The Qaddafi Connection' in The New York Times supported Toohey's assertions.

In an interview with documentary maker Peter Butt, Michael Hand's military colleague and Nugan Hand "fixer", Douglas Sapper, claimed that Nugan Hand Bank had been a conduit for CIA money.

== Locating Hand ==
In March 1991, the Australian magazine The Eye reported that Michael Hand was living in the United States, giving an address and other details, but Australian authorities declined to pursue an extradition.

In November 2015, the Sydney Morning Herald reported that Peter Butt had located Hand living under the name Michael Jon Fuller in Idaho Falls, Idaho. Butt queried the failure of the FBI to find him, given that Fuller's social security numbers are identical to Hand's. In Ross Coulthart's 60 Minutes (Nine Network, Australia) segment, he approached Hand as he was leaving a chemist shop in Idaho Falls.

== See also ==
- United States espionage in Australia
- Banco Ambrosiano, bank in Italy with alleged links to clandestine military operations and alleged CIA involvement
- Bank of Credit and Commerce International, international bank with alleged ties to Iran–Contra and numerous financial crimes
- Allegations of CIA drug trafficking

== Sources ==
- Cockington, J. (2001) History Happened Here, ABC Books, Sydney.
- Kwitney, J. The Crimes of Patriots, a True Tale of Dope, Dirty Money, and the CIA; New York: W.W. Norton, 1987, ISBN 0-393-02387-7.
- McCoy, A. The Politics of Heroin: CIA Complicity in the Global Drug Trade; New York: Harpers and Row, Publishers Inc., 1991 ISBN 1-55652-125-1
- Owen, J. Sleight of Hand : The $25 million Nugan Hand Bank Scandal; Balmain, Sydney, Australia: Colporteur Press, 1983. ISBN 0-86399-023-1
- Jiggens, John Lawrence (2008). "Marijuana Australiana: Cannabis use, popular culture and the Americanisation of drugs policy in Australia, 1938–1988". Queensland University of Technology.
