= Dan Moldea =

American journalist

Dan E. Moldea
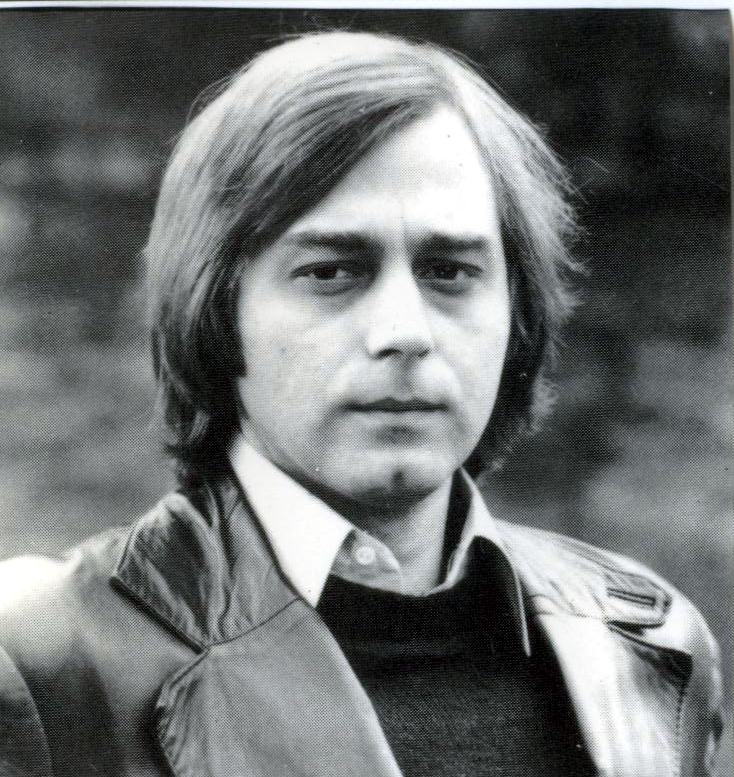
- Moldea from The Hoffa Wars in 1978
- Born: February 27, 1950 (age 76); Akron, Ohio, U.S.
- Occupations: Non-fiction author, investigative journalist
- Writing career
- Genres: Organized crime, political corruption
- Website: www.moldea.com

Dan E. Moldea (born February 27, 1950) is an American bestselling author and investigative journalist who has reported on organized crime and political corruption since 1974. He is the author of books about the rise and fall of Jimmy Hoffa, the contract killing of an Ohio businessman, the Mafia's penetration of Hollywood, its links to Ronald Reagan, and its influence on professional football, as well as works about the assassination of Senator Robert Kennedy, the O.J. Simpson murder case, the suicide of White House Deputy Counsel Vincent Foster, the Anthony Pellicano wiretapping scandal and prosecution, and corruption in higher education via the student-loan program and for-profit colleges.

== Biography ==
He is of Romanian descent. Moldea received his bachelor's degree in English and history from the University of Akron where he served as student body president. He did his post-graduate work at Kent State University, where he taught a course, "Racism and Poverty," in the Honors and Experimental College. During this period he worked part-time as a truck driver and loader for Teamsters Local 24 in Akron.

Moldea has lectured about "The Mafia in America" at colleges and universities throughout the country and has appeared on numerous national and local radio and television programs. Moldea was interviewed for the 1988 Jack Anderson documentary American Expose: Who Killed JFK?. That same year he appeared in an episode of The Kwitny Report discussing the American mafia and Kennedy's assassination. He was also featured in the 2004 film, The Hunting of the President.

Moldea is a former president of Washington Independent Writers. He is also a former national vice president of the National Writers Union.

In Moldea v. New York Times, Moldea sued The New York Times, alleging a review of Interference: How Organized Crime Influences Professional Football was libelous. In 1994, after the lower court dismissed the case, the U.S. Court of Appeals for the D.C. Circuit reinstated it in an opinion known as Moldea I. Then, in what has been described as an unprecedented moment in American jurisprudence, the same appellate court, in Moldea II, snatched away Moldea's victory, reversing itself and ruling for the Times. The U.S. Supreme Court allowed Moldea II to stand.

Since 1998, Moldea, a registered private investigator, has also worked as an independent investigative consultant, participating in what he has described as, "a wide variety of breathtaking and mind-blowing capers."

Moldea describes himself as “Ahab” and has said that the Jimmy Hoffa murder case is his “white whale.” He is widely regarded as one of the top experts on this crime. He started covering the Teamsters in 1974 as a crime reporter for the Daily Reporter in Ohio. In 1978 he published the book The Hoffa Wars about Hoffa's life of crime. It became a Book of the Month Club selection. The book has been described as "one of the most comprehensive studies of the association between the Teamsters and organized crime". A second revised and expanded edition was released in 1993, featuring an introduction by Jonathan Kwitny.

The third edition of Confessions of a Guerrilla Writer, Moldea's memoir about his career as a crime reporter, was released in 2020, featuring new information about the Jimmy Hoffa murder case.

== Works ==
The first chapters of Dan Moldea's books are available on his website.

- The Hoffa Wars: Teamsters, Rebels, Politicians, and the Mob (1978)
  - 1993 edition includes an introduction by Jonathan Kwitny.
- The Hunting of Cain: A True Story of Money, Greed, and Fratricide (1983)
- Dark Victory: Ronald Reagan, MCA, and the Mob. New York: Open Media (1986)
- Interference: How Organized Crime Influences Professional Football New York: William Morrow & Co. (1989). ISBN 978-0688083038.
- The Killing of Robert F. Kennedy: An Investigation of Motive, Means, and Opportunity. New York: W. W. Norton & Co. (1995). ISBN 978-0393037913. OCLC 231650171.
- Evidence Dismissed: The Inside Story of the Police Investigation of O.J. Simpson, with Tom Lange and Philip Vannatter (1997)
- A Washington Tragedy: How the Suicide of Vincent Foster Ignited a Political Firestorm (1998)
- Confessions of a Guerrilla Writer: Adventures in the Jungles of Crime, Politics, and Journalism (2013)
- Hollywood Confidential: A True Story of Wiretapping, Friendship, and Betrayal (2018)
- Money, Politics, and Corruption in U.S. Higher Education: The Stories of Whistleblowers (2020)
