= Ed Calderon =

Former Mexican law enforcement officer and speaker on cartels

- Calderon speaking at an event in 2026
- Born: Tijuana, Mexico
- Occupation: Security consultant
- Employer: Baja state police
- Known for: Speaking on Mexican cartels
- Children: 1
- Website: www.edsmanifesto.com

Ed Calderon is a security consultant, combat instructor, and former law enforcement officer specializing in counter-narcotics and organized crime units in Mexico. Calderon reports on cartel activity in the United States.

== Early life ==
Calderon was born in Tijuana, Mexico. He was exposed to violence in his youth, experiencing his first cartel hit in-person when he was 12 years old. Calderon's mother, Elvira, carried a concealed knife to protect them. Calderon's brother died during his childhood.

Calderon initially enrolled in medical school, when in his second year, the September 11 attacks occurred. Residual effects from the attacks caused the Mexican economy to suffer. While Calderon was looking for jobs, he found a vague ad for young, unmarried individuals who "stalled out in university". This led to Calderon working for the Mexican government.

== Career ==
Calderon spent 12 years as a police officer working in Baja California, Mexico, specializing in counter-narcotics and organized crime units. He reports on cartel activity within the United States. Calderon has been characterized by BBC as a specialist on the Mexico–United States border, dealing in its "underworld".

Calderon designed a knife with TOPS Knives, based on a paring knife, that incorporated details he found useful in his experiences, named El Pionero. He also partnered with Kopis Designs to design a "bird's beak" blade, named the L-Via after his mother, Elvira.

Calderon teaches self-defense classes, focusing on weaponology and counter-custody.

=== Podcast ===
Calderon runs the platform, Ed's Manifesto, which includes a podcast. The name stemmed from a notebook Calderon kept with him, detailing strategies used by cartel members, with the most interest being given to those for evading capture or escaping from restraints.

He has been a guest on podcasts such as The Joe Rogan Experience, Lex Fridman Podcast and The Shawn Ryan Show.

Joe Rogan has previously cited reporting from Calderon to criticize raids conducted by United States Immigration and Customs Enforcement on undocumented immigrants within the country.

== Personal life ==
Calderon survived an attempted hit on his life, causing him to move to the United States. He writes poetry and is a recovering alcoholic. Calderon has a daughter.

== See also ==
- Crime in Mexico
- Mexican drug war
