= Foreign espionage in Australia =

Espionage activities in Australia by foreign entities

Countries accused of espionage in Australia include China, India, Israel, Russia, the Soviet Union and the United States.

== China ==
In May 2024, it was reported that more than 1,200 Chinese spies were operating in Australia.

== India ==
On 30 April 2024, It was reported in the media that in 2020, Australia removed a "nest of spies" from the country.

== Iran ==
In August 2024, ASIO director Mike Burgess claimed that Iran had been one of "three or four" foreign countries spying on and attempting to intimidate diaspora communities in Australia.

== Russia ==
See also Petrov Affair, Combe-Ivanov affair

On 11 July 2024, two Russian-born Australians were arrested for allegedly conspiring the share ADF secrets with Russia.

== United States ==
Throughout the Cold War, the United States maintained a number of "informants" throughout Australian political life. Most notable was head of ACTU Bob Hawke, who later became PM. Several authors such as John Pilger have alleged CIA involvement in the 1975 Whitlam dismissal. In 2010, the United States diplomatic cables leak published by WikiLeaks exposed a number of politicians as informants for the US Embassy, such as Mark Arbib and Peter Khalil.

== See also ==
- Australian Secret Intelligence Service
- Australian Security Intelligence Organisation
- Foreign espionage in New Zealand
- Australia–East Timor spying scandal
- Australia–Indonesia spying scandal
