= Murray Riley =

Australian rower (1925–2020)

Personal information
- Born: Murray Stewart Riley; 5 October 1925
- Died: 1 April 2020 (aged 94) Gold Coast, Queensland, Australia
- Occupations: Police officer, Olympian, Criminal

Sport
- Sport: Rowing
Medal record
Men's rowing
Representing Australia
Olympic Games
Bronze medal – third place	1956 Melbourne	Double sculls
British Empire (and Commonwealth) Games
Gold medal – first place	1950 Auckland	Double sculls
Gold medal – first place	1954 Vancouver	Double sculls

Murray Stewart Riley (5 October 1925 – 1 April 2020) was an Australian Olympic rowing athlete, who, after leaving a career as a police officer, gained notoriety as a criminal. Riley represented Australia at the 1952 and 1956 Summer Olympics in double scull rowing, winning a bronze medal in 1956. He served as a police officer in Sydney from 1943 until 1962, when he resigned after disciplinary charges were leveled against him. After his resignation from the police, Riley embarked on a criminal career that included convictions for drug trafficking and fraud. He was implicated in the Nugan Hand Bank scandal and associated with leading figures in the American Mafia, including Jimmy Fratianno of the Los Angeles crime family and corrupt Teamsters official Michael Rudy Tham. He died in 2020 at the age of 94.

== Australian rowing champion ==
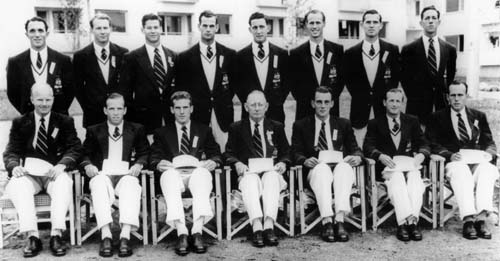
Riley (seated 3rd from left) in the 1952 Olympic Rowing Squad

Riley participated in the double scull (rowing) events at the Empire Games with Merv Wood, who later became NSW police commissioner, in 1950 and 1954, winning gold for Australia. He also competed in the 1952 Summer Olympics and in the 1956 Summer Olympics, winning bronze in 1956. In 1952, he and his partner John Rogers were eliminated in the semi-final repechage of the 1952 Summer Olympics men's double sculls.

== Life as a NSW police officer ==
Riley and Wood, his Olympic double sculls rowing partner, met in the NSW Police Force, where Riley had been a member since 1943. As a young policeman, Riley met, and was mentored by, unscrupulous senior officers such as Ray "Gunner" Kelly and Fred Krahe. By the early 1950s, Riley was associating with members of criminal networks, including poker machine distributor Ray Smith and Sydney gangster Lennie McPherson.

Riley was awarded the Queen's Commendation for Brave Conduct and rose to the rank of Detective Sergeant, but he was subject to disciplinary charges when he took "a communication to a person in gaol". He subsequently resigned from the force in 1962.

== Life of crime ==
It is probable that Riley's criminality began long before his resignation from the police force and his eventual conviction for drug smuggling. At trial, barrister Donald Stewart challenged Riley over a fabricated confession in a murder trial and also Riley's offer to destroy the statement if he was paid a bribe. Later, the clearly angry Riley verbally threatened Stewart and then attempted to run him down with his car.

In 1962, Riley entered the poker machine and club industry as a manager for Ray Smith, later moving to work for, and then partnering with, Wally Dean. Together Dean and Riley began "defrauding licensed clubs by obtaining payment for services not provided". Riley's first arrest occurred in New Zealand in 1966, when he attempted to bribe a policeman. He was sentenced to 12 months imprisonment and later deported.

In 1966, NSW policeman John Wesley Egan initiated the "corset gang", the first organised heroin trafficking operation from South-East Asia into Australia and the United States. It is suggested that Riley and Henry Brian (Harry) Ikin were among the former or serving police officers who participated in the operation, often using fraudulently obtained passports. Egan was eventually arrested and jailed in the USA. Upon his return to Sydney in 1975, he declared: "Organised crime and highly placed policemen are often the same people".

In 1973, the Moffitt Royal Commission into organised crime dealt extensively with Riley and his alleged associates, including Leonard McPherson. Riley was widely reported to be in Sydney; however, police could not find him. Consequently, he avoided giving evidence before Justice Athol Moffitt who recorded that Riley "had been treated with undue favour by [the police]". Upon recommendation of Moffitt the NSW Police Crime Intelligence Unit (CIU) was established in 1974–75 and Riley became one of its priority targets.

=== Mafia connections and drug running ===
During the mid-1970s, Riley and Bela Csidei made regular trips to San Francisco to meet with known American Mafia figures and to gain entrée to the American underworld. Riley was photographed with Sal Amarena of the Santos Trafficante mafia family. Riley also formed links with the Teamsters and Mafia through associations with Rudy Tham.

By 1975, Riley, now known as a criminal heavy who could offer protection from other criminals, had become associated with two emerging Sydney drug traffickers, Michael and Patricia Moylan. Riley and Michael Moylan began to have frequent meetings with the American mobster, James Fratianno and subsequently carried out at least thirty successful importations from America into Australia. Their enterprise used female croupiers employed at Sydney's illegal casino, the "Double Bay Bridge Club", to courier drugs concealed in their corsets.

This Mafia affiliation also appears to have influenced Australian corporate and criminal interests to move into the drug trade. In 1976, the arrest of some of the Moylan's couriers led to the collapse of the syndicate and caused the Moylans to flee overseas. Riley subsequently arranged his own imports again using the 'Double Bay Bridge Club' couriers.

In Sydney, Riley formed separate business relationships with Fratianno's former associate George Countis and Harry Sayvanus Wainwright, a fugitive American lawyer, both of whom had settled in Australia in the late 1960s. Countis and Wainwright subsequently introduced Riley to ex-Green Beret and businessman, Michael Hand, co-founder of the Nugan Hand Bank.

=== Nugan Hand Bank ===
The Nugan Hand Bank was alleged to have cultivated Sydney criminal networks, corrupt Australian politicians, the CIA, and a network of ex-CIA arms dealers. The bank prospered becoming a bridge between large legitimate banks and organised crime syndicates. It laundered illegal money in drug and arms deals that often financed intelligence operations. Riley's Hong Kong partner was John Doyle, who had connections with senior Triad members linked to the drug markets in Manila, Singapore and Thailand.

Hand acted upon Riley's advice to open Nugan Hand branches in all three countries, especially Bangkok, "to attract drug money". This was later confirmed by Neil Evans, who ran the bank's Chiang Mai office. Harry Wainwright maintained a $30,000 float with Nugan Hand with instructions that Murray Riley and fellow drug smuggler, Ken Derley, had use of his money. Consequently, in April 1976, Riley withdrew $15,000 from the Hong Kong branch and personally brought the first consignment of heroin into Brisbane in a false-bottom suitcase. Hand transferred a total of $295,000 to Hong Kong for the benefit of Riley, who used subordinates to smuggle heroin consignments, much of it destined for the Australian market.

=== The Anoa failure ===
During mid-1978, acting upon underworld chatter about an impending drug importation, the CIU mounted a task force operation involving the Australian Bureau of Narcotics, Commonwealth Police and the Australian armed forces. Riley had earlier planned to smuggle 4.5 tonnes of top grade cannabis from Thailand to Australia aboard the fishing vessel Choryo Maru. When the ageing Choryo Maru developed engine problems, the cannabis was offloaded into the hulk of the Amagi Maru, which had run aground on a reef east of Papua New Guinea.

On 23 May 1978, the yacht Anoa, recently purchased in Cairns, set sail to retrieve the stash. Two weeks later, the CIU task force were tracking the Anoa, now loaded with 2.7 tonnes of cannabis, as it sailed down the East coast of Australia. Riley and his girlfriend, Carol Anne Dean ( wife of Wally Dean), were also observed as they too shadowed the vessel down the Queensland coast. The crew eventually docked at North Haven wharf on the Camden River, NSW and unloaded the cannabis into two trucks. News of the ensuing police raid and arrests tipped off Riley who, after "eluding" police for three weeks, was eventually apprehended in Adelaide. In Sydney, he pleaded guilty to a charge of being a "transportation agent" for 1.5 tonnes of cannabis and received a relatively light sentence of ten years' imprisonment, with possible parole after five years.

=== The criminal milieu ===
The Woodward Royal Commission into Drug Trafficking (1977–79) accused Riley of being involved in importing heroin from Bangkok in 1977. A 1982 Joint Taskforce on Drug Trafficking found that he had carried out five successful heroin importations in 1976. These events related to Riley's involvement with the Nugan Hand Bank. Riley failed to appear at the enquiry after police conveniently failed to find him. This "failure" is consistent with the opinion of Evan Whitton (1986), who used additional research from Bob Bottom to outline Australia's "criminal milieu", which consists of inter-related and overlapping criminal syndicates and their support group consisting of politicians, police, lawyers, businessmen, accountants and the judiciary.

Similarly, Alfred W. McCoy (1980) has noted that Riley was not without friends during and after the Anoa episode. Nine months after his conviction, Riley was still being held in the more comfortable remand section of Long Bay Jail. A further seven years was added to his sentence when he was subsequently convicted of other major offences including conspiracy to defraud American Express of $274,000. Nevertheless, his continued privileges allowed him the run of Long Bay Jail and excursions outside. Only a protest from the Prison Officers Association forced the cancellation of his transfer to a minimum-security prison at Emu Plains.

In 1983 the comfortably incarcerated Riley was declared bankrupt, owing $132,497 to Nugan Hand Bank (in liquidation). He was released in May 1984, having served less than six years of his seventeen-year sentence, when the NSW government introduced new prisoner parole legislation. Soon after his release, Riley began collaborating with gunman Arthur Stanley (Neddy) Smith and pilot Peter David Johnstone to fly about 50 kilograms of heroin from Papua New Guinea for distribution in Australia.

=== Prison escapes ===
By the 1990s, Riley had changed his name by deed poll to Murray Lee Stewart. In October 1990, Riley and Jonathan Nicholas Gould were arrested in Britain and charged with conspiring to defraud British Aerospace PLC of £40,000,000 by way of computer fraud. In July 1991, they were both convicted of conspiracy to defraud and were sentenced to five years imprisonment. Again, Riley was not without friends. While Gould remained in a medium-security prison, Riley's risk classification was rapidly revised, allowing him to be accommodated at an open prison farm. In December 1991, Riley simply walked out of Spring Hill Prison, Aylesbury. His escape was not recorded for seven weeks and he remained at large for eight weeks; travelling to Northern Ireland, Spain and Belgium before being recaptured in Essex on 31 January 1992.

After being returned to prison, he was again rapidly moved to a minimum-security prison in Kent. While police knew that he had been in contact with the IRA while on the run and intended to escape again, no extra security was initiated. On 19 January 1993, Riley escaped again and is believed to have taken part in a multimillion-pound IRA counterfeit racket. He eventually settled incognito in Hong Kong.

In early 1994, Riley flew from Hong Kong to Australia and settled in Queensland. Upon his fourth application, he was issued with an Australian passport. A spokesman for the British Home Office said unofficially it would be "extremely unlikely" that Riley would be extradited to the United Kingdom. He said that Riley had been found guilty of the "victimless" crime of conspiracy and the cost of bringing him back to London under police escort would be "exorbitant".

== See also ==
- Allegations of CIA drug trafficking
