= E.C. Mullendore III =

Victim of unsolved murder, Oklahoma, US

- Born: Eugene Claremont Mullendore III; October 26, 1937
- Died: September 26, 1970 (aged 32); Osage County, Oklahoma, U.S.
- Cause of death: Murder by gunshot
- Known for: Unsolved murder
- Spouse: Linda Vance Mullendore
- Children: 4
- Relatives: John W. Mecom Jr. (brother-in-law)

Eugene Claremont "E.C." Mullendore III (October 26, 1937 – September 26, 1970) was an heir to one of the largest cattle ranches in Oklahoma. His death in 1970 was one of the most famous unsolved murder mysteries in Oklahoma history.

== Early life ==
E.C. Mullendore III was born to Eugene Claremont "Gene" Mullendore Jr. and Kathleen (Boren) Mullendore. He had a sister Katsy, who was married to John W. Mecom Jr., the owner of the National Football League New Orleans Saints. The Mullendore family owned the Cross Bell Ranch in Osage County, Oklahoma, which covered about 130,000 acres. He was married to Linda Vance Mullendore and they had four children.

== Murder ==
Gene Mullendore handed over management of the ranch to his son in 1960 because of his failing eyesight. E.C. ran up $12 million in debts on the ranch, in part due to their extravagant lifestyle. His wife moved to Tulsa, Oklahoma, with their children and planned to divorce E.C. On the night of September 26, 1970, E.C. Mullendore III was beaten and shot between the eyes in the den of his home on the ranch. His bodyguard/assistant Damon "Chub" Anderson was shot in the shoulder. Anderson claimed that he been upstairs drawing a bath when he heard a shot. He said that he rushed downstairs and found E.C. slumped on a couch and bleeding. When he approached the body, Anderson said he was shot once in the shoulder, but then returned gunfire on two fleeing men. The police made a number of mistakes in the investigation including disturbing the crime scene before physical evidence could be gathered and allowing E.C.'s body to be removed from the crime scene and later embalmed before an autopsy could be performed. Despite extensive investigation, no one was charged with the murder.

== Aftermath ==
There were a number of theories speculated on about who the murderer was and what the motive was, often involving the large debt on the ranch or his insurance policy. There was speculation of Mafia involvement in the death, reportedly because of debts that E.C. might have owed to them. E.C. had a $15 million life insurance policy on him, with his wife as the beneficiary. The family agreed to a $8 million settlement in 1971 after Linda Mullendore filed a lawsuit against the insurance company. In 1972, a bankruptcy plan was approved to pay off part of the ranch's debt and refinance the rest, including using $5 million of the insurance proceeds and selling off livestock and other ranch property.

According to private investigator Gary Glanz, in 2010 Chub Anderson told Glanz that he had killed E.C. in a fight after Anderson had helped deputies serve divorce papers on E.C. Anderson said that ranch hand Lonnie Joe Brown, his brother-in-law, had helped him stage the murder to look like intruders had killed E.C., including shooting Anderson in the arm. Chub Anderson died later that year.

The Wall Street Journal reporter Jonathan Kwitny wrote The Mullendore Murder Case in 1974 about the murder. Newspaper columnist Dale R. Lewis wrote the book Footprints in the Dew in 2015 about Chub Anderson. Lewis also made a documentary film Footprints in the Dew: The Last Ten Tapes based on interviews with Anderson.

== See also ==
- List of unsolved murders (1900–1979)
