= Pine Gap =

Joint Australia–United States base near Alice Springs, Australia

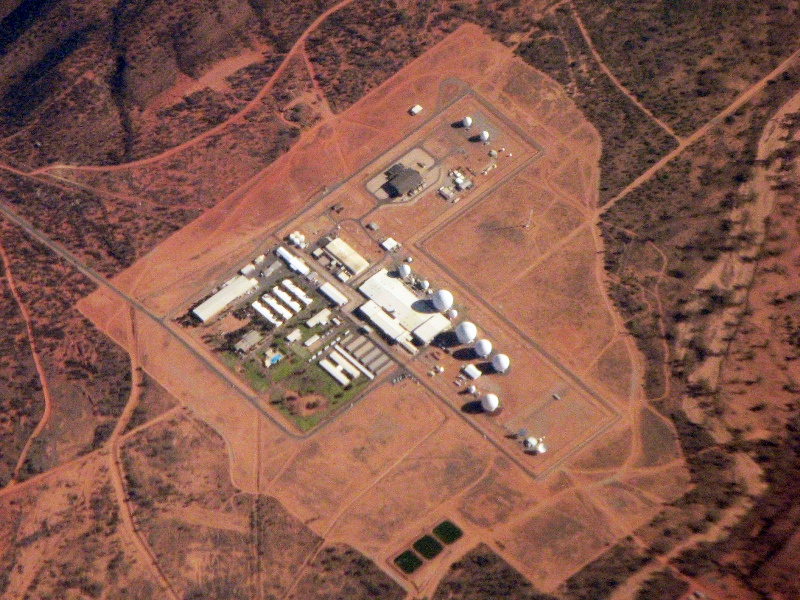

- Coordinates: 23°48′00″S 133°44′15″E
- Country: Australia
- State: Northern Territory

Pine Gap is a joint Australian–United States satellite communications and signals intelligence surveillance base and Australian Earth station approximately 18 km (11 mi) south-west of the town of Alice Springs. It is jointly operated by Australia and the United States, and since 1988 it has been officially called the Joint Defence Facility Pine Gap (JDFPG); previously, it was known as Joint Defence Space Research Facility. It plays a crucial role in supporting the intelligence activities and military operations of the US around the world.

The station is jointly run by the Australian Defence Force (Australian Signals Directorate), the US Central Intelligence Agency (CIA), US National Security Agency (NSA), and US National Reconnaissance Office (NRO) and is a key contributor to the NSA's global interception/surveillance effort, which includes the ECHELON program. The classified NRO name for the Pine Gap base is Australian Mission Ground Station (AMGS), while the unclassified cover term for the NSA function of the facility is RAINFALL.

== Base ==
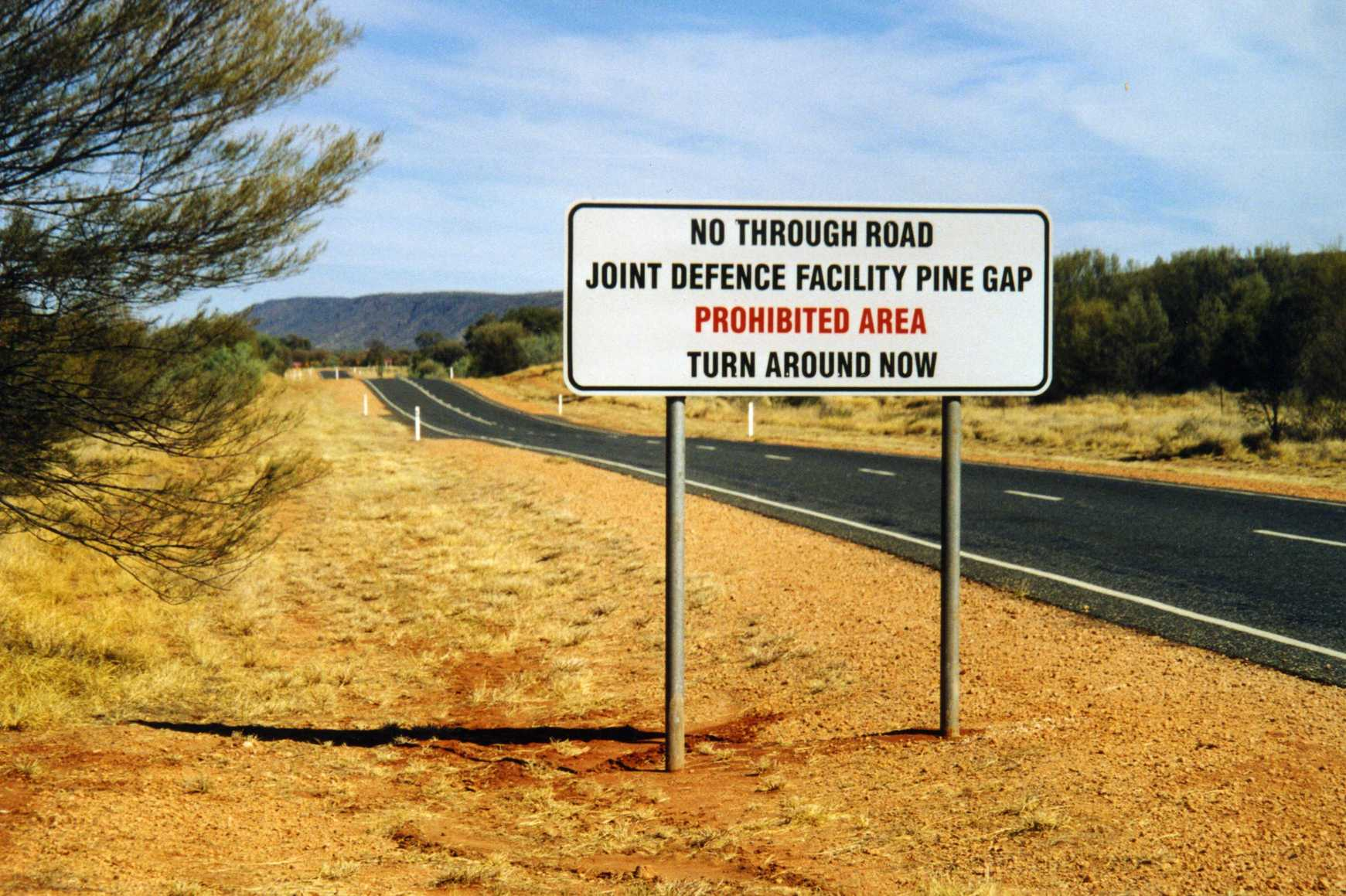
Warning sign on the road to Pine Gap

The facilities at the base consist of a massive super computer complex with 38 radomes protecting radio dishes and operates with over 800 employees, half of whom are Australian. Former NSA employee David Rosenberg indicated that the chief of the facility was a senior CIA officer at the time of his service there. Documents released by Edward Snowden stated that the role of chief of facility is always filled by a US citizen, who reports directly to the US National Reconnaissance Office. A senior Australian Signals Directorate official acts as deputy.

The location is strategically significant because it controls United States spy satellites as they pass over one-third of the globe, including China, North Korea, the Asian parts of Russia, and the Middle East. Central Australia was chosen because it was too remote for spy ships passing in international waters to intercept its signals. The facility has become a key part of the local economy.

=== Military activities ===
Pine Gap's activities have become more military-focused over time. One of its roles is to detect and geolocate the source of electronic signals, such as those emitted by mobile phones. This information is used by Five Eyes to identify and geolocate targets of interest, which it can then attack using special forces or lethal unmanned drones, for example.

Since it was established, Pine Gap has assisted the US in planning for nuclear war.

Leaked Department of Defence documents revealed that satellites controlled by the Pine Gap and Joint Defence Facility Nurrungar facilities were used during the Vietnam War to pinpoint targets for bombings in Cambodia.

Joint Defence Facility Nurrungar relayed warnings of Scud missile launches to the Israel Defence Forces (IDF) during the Gulf War in the early 1990s. By 2003, this function had been fully transferred to Pine Gap.

Location data provided by Pine Gap was used by the US drone programme, which has killed between 2500 and 3500 al-Qaeda and Taliban soldiers as well as hundreds of civilians.

During the Gaza war, it is alleged Pine Gap provided the IDF with communications and electronic intelligence, which it had collected using two geosynchronous Orion satellites located over the Indian Ocean.

== Operational history ==
In late 1966, during the Cold War, a joint US–Australian treaty called for the creation of a US satellite surveillance base in Australia, to be titled the "Joint Defence Space Research Facility". The purpose of the facility was initially referred to in public as "space research". It was officially referred to as a "joint space research facility" until 1988. The Pine Gap treaty was signed on 9 December 1966 and stated that, after an initial nine years, either Australia or the US could cancel the agreement on giving one year's notice.

Operations started in 1970 when about 400 American families moved to Central Australia. The function of the base when it first opened was to monitor military activities such as missile tests in Russia, China, Pakistan, Japan, Korea, and India.

The base was placed on nuclear alert by the US Government during the Yom Kippur War in 1973 when US secretary of state Henry Kissinger issued a DEFCON 3 force-wide alert. Australian personnel at the base, the Australian Government and Prime Minister Gough Whitlam were not informed of the alert.

Since the end of the Cold War in 1991 and the rise of the war on terror in 2001, the base has seen a refocusing from mere nuclear treaty monitoring and missile launch detection, to become a vital warfighting base for US military forces. In 1999, with the Australian Government refusing to give details to an Australian Senate committee about the relevant treaties, intelligence expert Professor Des Ball from the Australian National University was called to give an outline of Pine Gap. According to Ball, since 9 December 1966 when the Australian and United States governments signed the Pine Gap treaty, Pine Gap had grown from the original two antennas to about 18 in 1999, and 38 by 2017. The number of staff had increased from around 400 in the early 1980s to 600 in the early 1990s and then to 800 in 2017, the biggest expansion since the end of the Cold War.

Ball described the facility as the ground control and processing station for geosynchronous satellites engaged in signals intelligence collection, outlining four categories of signals collected:

- telemetry from advanced weapons development, such as ballistic missiles, used for arms control verification;
- signals from anti-missile and anti-aircraft radars;
- transmissions intended for communications satellites; and
- microwave emissions, such as long-distance telephone calls.

Ball described the operational area as containing three sections: Satellite Station Keeping Section, Signals Processing Station and the Signals Analysis Section, from which Australians were barred until 1980. Each morning the Joint Reconnaissance Schedule Committee meets to determine what the satellites will monitor over the next 24 hours.

With the closing of Nurrungar in 1999, an area in Pine Gap was set aside for the United States Air Force's control station for Defense Support Program satellites that monitor heat emissions from missiles, giving first warning of ballistic missile launches. In 2004, the base began operating a new satellite system known as the Space-Based Infrared System, which is a vital element of US missile defence.

Since the end of the Cold War, the station has mainly been employed to intercept and record weapons and communications signals from countries in Asia, such as China and North Korea. The station was active in supporting the wars in Yugoslavia, Afghanistan and Iraq and every US war since the September 11 attacks.

The Menwith Hill Station (MHS) in the UK is operated by the NSA and also serves as ground station for these satellite missions.

One of Pine Gap's primary functions is to locate radio signals in the Eastern Hemisphere, with the collected information fed into the US drone program. This was confirmed by an NSA document from 2013, which says that Pine Gap plays a key role in providing geolocation data for intelligence purposes, as well as for military operations, including air strikes.

On 11 July 2013, documents revealed through former NSA analyst Edward Snowden showed that Pine Gap, among three other locations in Australia and one in New Zealand, contributed to the NSA's global interception and collection of internet and telephone communications, which involves systems like XKEYSCORE. Journalist Brian Toohey states that Pine Gap intercepts electronic communications from Australian citizens including phone calls, emails and faxes as a consequence of the technology it uses.

According to documents published in August 2017, Pine Gap is used as a ground station for spy satellites on two secret missions:

- Mission 7600 with 2 geosynchronous satellites to cover Eurasia and Africa
- Mission 8300 with 4 geosynchronous satellites that covered the former Soviet Union, China, South Asia, East Asia, the Middle East, Eastern Europe, and countries on the Atlantic Ocean

After the inexplicable March 2014 disappearance of Malaysia Airlines flight MH 370, a Boeing 777 passenger jet, authorities suggested that Pine Gap or Jindalee (JORN) radar site might have data to help locate the missing aircraft.

== Whitlam dismissal ==
Gough Whitlam, Prime Minister of Australia (between 1972 and 1975), considered closing the base. Victor Marchetti, a former CIA officer who had helped set up the facility, said that this consideration "caused apoplexy in the White House, [and] a kind of Chile [coup] was set in motion", with the CIA and MI6 working together to get rid of the Prime Minister. On 11 November 1975, the day Whitlam was scheduled to brief the Australian Parliament on the secret CIA presence in Australia, as well as it being "the last day of action if an election of any kind was to be held before Christmas", he was dismissed from office as he was unable to guarantee supply (money required for the functions of the government) by the Governor-General John Kerr, using reserve powers, described as "archaic" by critics of the decision.

In 2020, previously confidential private correspondences between the Palace and the Governor-General were released. In one of the letters, John Kerr describes his alleged CIA connections as "Nonsense of course", and assured the Queen of his continued loyalty. Nonetheless, according to revelations from CIA whistleblower Christopher John Boyce, Kerr allegedly maintained ties with CIA-funded organisations and was referred to as 'our man Kerr' by the agency.

== Allegations of Christopher Boyce ==
During his trial for espionage, US defence industry employee Christopher Boyce made a number of allegations related to the intelligence gathered at Pine Gap (including claiming that the CIA was involved in the Whitlam Dismissal). He stated that, despite the US agreeing to share intelligence from Pine Gap with Australia, he was told that the US did and would withhold some information from the Australians. Boyce also said that Pine Gap was monitoring telephone calls and telex messages to and from Australia of a political nature.

== Protests ==
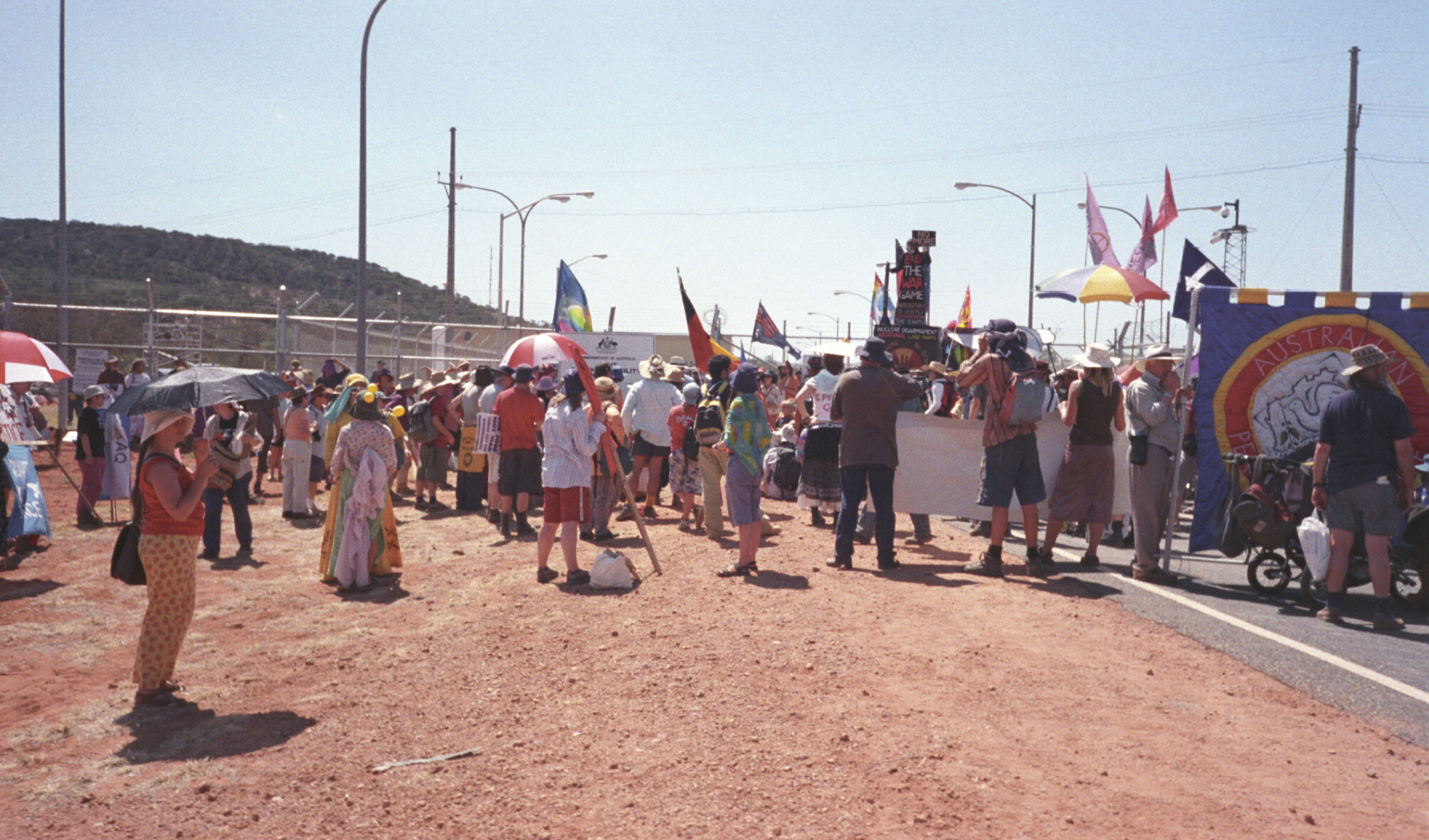
A protest against the Iraq War held at Pine Gap in 2002

- On 11 November 1983 the Pine Gap Women's Peace Camp begun in which Aboriginal women led 700 other women to the Pine Gap gates where they fell silent for 11 minutes to commemorate Remembrance Day and the Greenham Common protest in Britain. This was the beginning of a two-week, women-only peace camp, organised under the auspices of "Women For Survival". The gathering was nonviolent but several women trespassed onto the military base. 111 women were arrested on one particular day and gave their names as Karen Silkwood, an American nuclear worker who died after campaigning for nuclear safety. There were allegations of police brutality and an Australian Human Rights Commission inquiry ensued.
- On 5–7 October 2002, a number of groups (including Quakers and the National Union of Students) gathered at the gates of Pine Gap to protest the use of the base in the then-impending Iraq war.
- In December 2005, six members of the Christians Against All Terrorism group staged a protest outside Pine Gap. Four of them later broke into the facility and were arrested. Their trial began on 3 October 2006 and was the first time that Australia's Defense (Special Undertakings) Act 1952 was used. The Pine Gap Four cross-appealed to have their convictions quashed. In February 2008, the four members successfully appealed against their convictions and were acquitted.
- On 28 September 2016, a group of five people calling themselves “Peace Pilgrims” entered the prohibited zone around Pine Gap and were arrested and tried for trespass.

=== Pro-Palestinian demonstrations ===
On 20 October 2023, pro-Palestinian demonstrators blocked Hatt Road, the entryway to Pine Gap, calling for a ceasefire in Gaza. Protesters blockaded Hatt Road, the main access road to Pine Gap in late November 2023 due to concerns that information collected at the facility was being passed to the IDF and being used to identify targets within Gaza during the Gaza war. On 20 November 2023 a group of about 20 protesters, calling themselves Mparntwe (the Arrernte name of Alice Springs) for Palestine, set up a blockade on the main access road to Pine Gap. Since then Mparntwe for Palestine has held regular protests outside of Pine Gap gaining support from local traditional owners and Alice Springs residents as the base may make the region a potential nuclear target.

20 July 2026 saw the biggest protest at Pine Gap since 1987, with about 300 people showing up. The protest included the reading and delivery of a letter by Arrernte traditional owners demanding the land to be returned and compensation for the decades of unlawful occupation.

== In popular culture ==
Peter "Turbo" Teatoff is seen delivering heavy machinery to JDFPG in season 4 episode 11 of Outback Truckers.

Pine Gap features prominently in the third and fourth thriller novels of the Jack West Jr. series—The Five Greatest Warriors and The Four Legendary Kingdoms, respectively—by the Australian writer Matthew Reilly.

Pine Gap is featured in the 2018 Australian television series of the same name. The series is a political thriller, portraying the lives of the members of the joint American–Australian intelligence team.

In the novel, The Secret History of Twin Peaks by Mark Frost, President Richard Nixon claims that Pine Gap is actually the site of an underground facility constructed by extraterrestrials.

In 1982 the Australian band Midnight Oil released "Power and the Passion", which contains a reference to Pine Gap.

On 6 March 2024, Australian YouTubers Aleksa Vulović, Alex Apollonov and Jordan Shanks uploaded a video to Vulović's channel Boy Boy, in which the trio attempted to enter Pine Gap. The trio were briefly detained and questioned after being denied entry at the front gate. The trio also kicked a soccer ball over the security fence and then asked to retrieve it as a prank. The next day, upon arrival at Sydney Airport, the trio were further questioned by the Australian Federal Police immediately after leaving the aircraft. The video featured an interview with Donna Mulhearn, one of the six members of the Christians Against All Terrorism group who attempted to sneak into Pine Gap in 2006, along with the discussion of the alleged CIA involvement in the Whitlam dismissal.

== See also ==
- Five Eyes alliance
- Joint Geological and Geophysical Research Station
- GCSB Waihopai
- RAF Menwith Hill
- Misawa Air Base

== Citations ==
=== Sources ===
General sources

- 1999 Joint Standing Committee on Treaties. An Agreement to extend the period of operation of the Joint Defence Facility at Pine Gap Archived 6 May 2015 at the Wayback Machine. Report 26. Parliament of the Commonwealth of Australia, October 1999.
- 2002 Craig Skehan, "Pine Gap gears for war with eye on Iraq" . Sydney Morning Herald, 30 September 2002.
- 2003 Australian Broadcasting Corporation, Pine Gap Archived 22 August 2014 at the Wayback Machine. Retranscription of program broadcast on 4 August 2003.
- 2007 Pine Gap 6
- "Judge rejects Pine Gap house arrest bid". The Australian. 29 May 2007.
- 2007 "Aussies eye BMD role" United Press International, 11 Jun
- 2007 "Pine Gap protest linked to Iraq war, pacifists tell court" ABC, Australia, 5 Jun
- 2007 Protesters get a wrist slap Archived 18 June 2007 at the Wayback Machine
