= Bourbon & Beefsteak =

Pub in Sydney, Australia

- Alternative names: The Bourbon

General information
- Location: Darlinghurst Road, Kings Cross, Sydney, Australia
- Opened: October 1967

Website
- www.thebourbon.com.au

The Bourbon & Beefsteak, latterly The Bourbon, is a pub in Kings Cross, Sydney, Australia. It was opened in October 1967 by Bernie Houghton with a 24-hour licence. At the time Kings Cross was a popular venue for United States G.I.s on rest and recreation leave from the Vietnam War. In 1999 it gained national attention after Australian cricket player Ricky Ponting was involved in a fight outside the pub. In 2019 it was sold for mixed-use development.
