= Francis John Nugan =

Australian businessman (1942–1980)

Francis John Nugan (30 December 1942 in Griffith, New South Wales – 27 January 1980 in Bowenfels, New South Wales), known as Frank Nugan, was an Australian lawyer and merchant banker known for co-founding the Nugan Hand Bank.

== Background ==
Frank's father, Alfred Neugarten, was born to Jewish parents in Germany and fought in the International Brigades in the Spanish Civil War. In 1938, Alfred migrated to Palestine with a son from an earlier marriage, where he would marry another Jewish refugee, Anneliese Meinhardt, in Jerusalem. The family migrated to Australia in 1939 and changed their name to Nugan. Frank used to claim to be Spanish. Frank Nugan was born in 1942 in the town of Griffith, New South Wales, a centre for fruit and vegetable growing, where his family had established the Nugan Fruit Group. He attended the University of Sydney (Bachelor of Laws, 1964) and University of California, Berkeley (Master of Laws, 1965).

== Career ==
After graduating, Nugan spent several years in Canada before returning to Sydney in 1968 and becoming a solicitor. In 1970 Nugan was a director of mineral exploration company Meekatharra Minerals when it came to the stock market in an initial public offering.

After prior share and land deals with New Yorker Michael Hand, Nugan set up with Hand the merchant bank Nugan Hand Ltd in 1973 with nominal share capital of $1m. Between 1976 and 1979 the bank's reported turnover rose from $30m to $1bn, as the bank opened offices in Hong Kong, Singapore, the Cayman Islands and Saudi Arabia.

Nugan was also a director of Nugan Group Ltd, a company his brother Kenneth had built up into a major fruit and vegetable distributor. In 1978 Nugan and his brother were among those charged with conspiracy to defraud the company; the legal defense was funded in part by funds taken from the bank.

== Death ==
On 27 January 1980, Nugan was found dead on an isolated dirt track near Bowenfels, New South Wales with a gunshot wound to the head, which the coroner concluded was self-inflicted. The crime scene was found to be disturbed with many footprints around the body, which was noted at the time by police. Nugan had acquired a shooter's license on 7 January and then a rifle the following day. The calling card of Nugan Hand's legal counsel, William Colby, was found in Nugan's pocket. In the days preceding his death, Nugan had sought to arrange a move to Florida with his US-born wife and three young children, and appeared confident that he could leave his Australian legal troubles behind him.

Continued speculation that Nugan had faked his own death, including a report from a businessman who said he saw and talked with Nugan while on a trip to the U.S., and was in hiding led authorities to exhume Nugan's body in February 1981. Dental records and fingerprints were used to confirm that the body was Nugan's.
