= Earl P. Yates =

US Navy admiral (1923–2021)

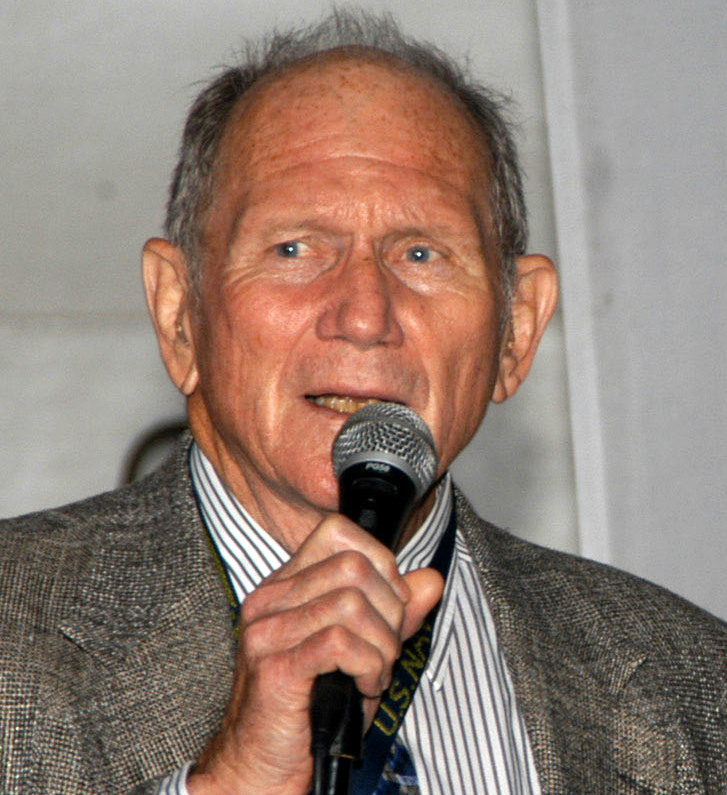
- Yates in 2005
- Born: Earl Preston Yates; December 23, 1923; Winston-Salem, North Carolina, U.S.
- Died: September 13, 2021 (aged 97); Virginia Beach, Virginia, U.S.
- Other name: Buddy
- Education: University of North Carolina; United States Naval Academy; Massachusetts Institute of Technology (MS)
- Military career
- Burial place: United States Naval Academy Cemetery
- Allegiance: United States of America
- Branch: United States Navy
- Service years: 1940–1974
- Rank: Rear admiral (upper half)
- Conflicts: World War II; Vietnam War
- Awards: Legion of Merit Presidential Unit Citation Ribbon; American Defense Service Medal; American Campaign Medal; Asiatic-Pacific Campaign Medal; World War II Victory Medal; National Defense Service Medal with Bronze Star; Vietnam Navy Distinguished Service Order with Bronze Star Republic of Vietnam Campaign Medal with Device

Earl Preston "Buddy" Yates (December 23, 1923 – September 13, 2021) was a rear admiral in the United States Navy. Yates graduated from the United States Naval Academy in 1944 and was, in 1967, one of the youngest male graduates of the 20th century from the academy. He was a commander of Fleet Air Wing 4. He is best known as the first commanding officer of the USS John F. Kennedy (CV-67), known then as CVA-67 in her original designation as a fixed wing attack carrier.

== Early life and education ==
Earl Preston Yates was born in Winston-Salem, North Carolina, on December 23, 1923, to Earl Preston and Elizabeth Pool (Holton) Yates. He attended Reynolds High School, and graduated in 1939 at the age of 15. He then attended the University of North Carolina at Chapel Hill, while waiting to become old enough for an appointment to the United States Naval Academy in Annapolis, Maryland.

== Career ==
Yates was appointed to the Naval Academy, and became a midshipman in 1940. He graduated with the Class of 1944 on June 9, 1943, in an accelerated graduation due to the extraordinary need for more officers during World War II.

As a newly commissioned ensign, he was assigned to the destroyer USS Dyson (DD-572) until December 1944. The Dyson was a unit of Destroyer Squadron Twenty-Three, which was awarded the Presidential Unit Citation: "For extraordinary heroism in action against enemy Japanese forces during the Solomon Islands Campaign, from November 1, 1943 to February 23, 1944."

He began flight training after returning to the United States in December 1944, and earned his wings as a Naval Aviator in December 1945. He then served with Bombing-Fighting Squadron Eighty-Two, before being sent back to Annapolis, Maryland for his postgraduate education in aeronautical engineering.

After further instruction with the Fleet All Weather Training Unit of the Atlantic, from June 1951 until January 1952, he served with Experimental Squadron Three. He was then transferred to Fighter Squadron Forty-One in June 1953, to serve as Executive Officer and then Commanding Officer until June 1955. Afterwards, he was assigned to the Department of the Navy in Washington, DC, in the Armament Division of the Bureau of Aeronautics.

In June 1958 he became the Executive Officer of Heavy Attack Squadron Nine, and later the Commanding Officer, until June 1960. He then attended the Air War College at Maxwell Air Force Base, Alabama, before his training with Carrier Air Group Eight in June 1961. He was then assigned back to Washington, DC, in November 1962, to the Joint Staff Office of the Joint Chiefs of Staff. He then served as Administrative Aide to the Secretary of the Navy in July 1963, and then as Executive Assistant and Naval Aide to the Assistant Secretary of the Navy for Research and Development in July 1964.

He assumed command of the USS Raleigh (LPD-1) in June 1965. He was later awarded the Legion of Merit for exceptionally meritorious service, during his time as Officer in Charge of the Commander of the Seventh Fleet Staff Detachment Charlie from July 1966 to July 1967. Afterwards, he served on the staff of the Commander of the Naval Air Force of the Atlantic Fleet.

In October 1967, he was named as the Prospective Commanding Officer of the attack aircraft carrier USS John F. Kennedy (CVA-67), which was being built at the Newport News Shipbuilding and Dry Dock Company in Virginia. The ship's official seal was designed and painted by Yates. He assumed command upon her commissioning on September 7, 1968.

His next assignment was to be the Commander of Fleet Air at the Naval Air Station on Whidbey Island, in Oak Harbor, Washington, in September 1969. In July 1971, he became Commander of Amphibious Operations Support Command of the Atlantic, and in May 1972 he served as Assistant Chief of Staff for Plans under the Commander in Chief of the Pacific.

== Retirement and later life ==
In the 1980s and 1990s, he worked with William Colby on the American Committee for a Free Vietnam, to help improve American relations with the new Vietnamese government and support the freedom of the people of Vietnam.

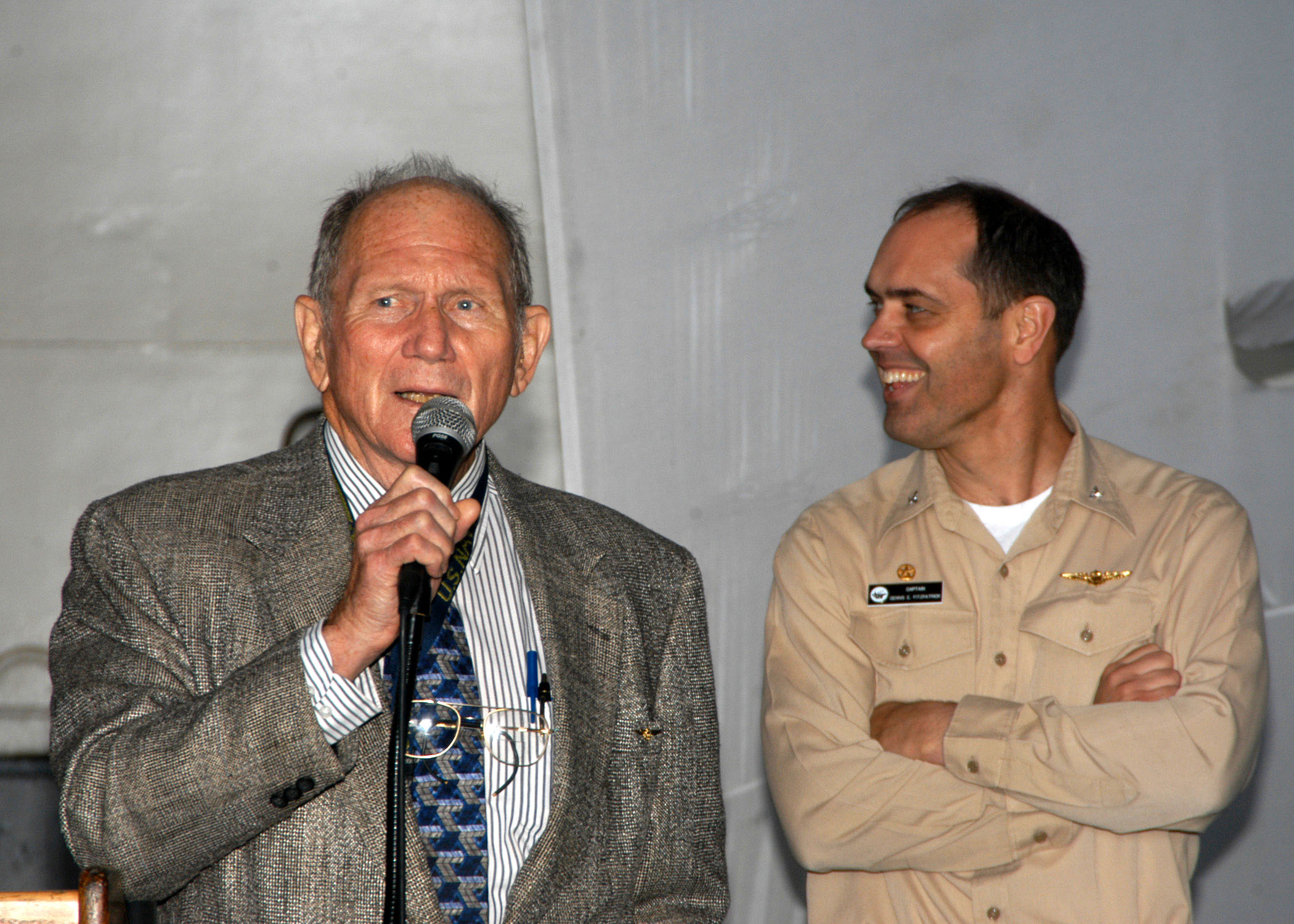
Rear Adm. Earl P. Yates (Ret.) with USS John F. Kennedy (CV-67) Commanding Officer Capt. Dennis E. Fitzpatrick (right) in 2005.

Yates continued his strong association with shipmates and veterans of the USS John F. Kennedy (CV-67), as well as the prospective crew of the USS John F. Kennedy (CVN-79), until his death. He was a featured guest and speaker at many CV-67 reunions, and a staunch supporter of the efforts to preserve the CV-67 as a museum. On August 22, 2015, he was present at the keel laying of the successor to the CV-67, the USS John F. Kennedy (CVN-79), and ordered the ship's keel laid. On December 7, 2019, he was present at the christening of the CVN-79 at the Newport News Shipyard.

On September 13, 2021, Yates died at his home in Virginia Beach, Virginia, at the age of 97. He was predeceased by his wife Lucy, after 63 years of marriage, on November 8, 2007, and their oldest son Eric on November 11, 2014.
