= Jonathan Kwitny =

American journalist

- Born: 23 March 1941; Indianapolis, Indiana, U.S.
- Died: 26 November 1998 (aged 57); New York City, New York
- Resting place: Journalist
- Education: New York University
- Writing career
- Subject: Non-fiction

Jonathan Kwitny (March 23, 1941 – November 26, 1998) was an American investigative journalist.

== Biography ==
Kwitny was born in Indianapolis. He earned a bachelor's degree in journalism at the University of Missouri's School of Journalism in 1962, and a master's degree in history at New York University in 1964. Kwitny was married twice. His first wife, Martha Kaplan, a deputy New Jersey state attorney general, with whom he had two daughters, died in 1978. His second wife was the poet Wendy Wood Kwitny, with whom he had two sons. Jonathan Kwitny died of stomach cancer in 1998.

His awards included the George Polk Award for television investigative reporting and the University of Missouri School of Journalism's honor medal for career achievement. Kwitny was also the author of several books on subjects which ranged from the Nugan Hand Bank scandal to a biography of Pope John Paul II.

== Career ==
Kwitny's career in journalism began as a reporter for the Perth Amboy News Tribune in 1963. In 1971 he joined The Wall Street Journal, where his articles frequently appeared as front-page features. In 1987, together with producer Tom Naughton, Kwitny created a half-hour news program for New York's WNYC-TV called The Kwitny Report. The show was carried on the PBS network and won the Polk Award for television investigative reporting in 1989, but was canceled that same year. At the time of his death, he was working for the Gannett newspaper company.

Kwitny was the author of a number of non-fiction books, including a biography of Pope John Paul II. When Kwitny met John Paul in the Vatican for a private audience in 1998, the Pope's first comment to him was, "I have read your book." He contributed the introduction to a 1993 expanded and revised edition of The Hoffa Wars by Dan E. Moldea.

== Works ==
=== Books ===
- The Mullendore Murder Case (1974). On the murder of Oklahoma rancher E.C. Mullendore III.
- Shakedown (1977). A novel.
- Vicious Circles: The Mafia in the Marketplace (1979). On Mafia involvement in white-collar crime. Extract via FBI.
- Endless Enemies: The Making of an Unfriendly World (1984). On U.S. foreign policy.
- The Crimes of Patriots: A True Story of Dope, Dirty Money, and the CIA (1988). On the Nugan Hand Bank scandal.
- Acceptable Risks (1992). On unapproved treatments for AIDS.
- The Super Swindlers: The Incredible Record of America's Greatest Financial Scams (1994)
  - An update of The Fountain Pen Conspiracy (1973)
- Man of the Century: The Life and Times of Pope John Paul II (1997). ISBN 978-0805026887.

=== Introductions ===
- Moldea, Dan E. (1993). "Introduction". The Hoffa Wars: Teamsters, Rebels, Politicians and the Mob. SPI Books. ISBN 978-1561712007.

=== Book reviews ===
- "Reinvestigating Watergate: The Elusive Glow of Truth." Review of Secret Agenda, by Jim Hougan. Wall Street Journal (Jan. 3, 1985), p. 9.
