= Margarita McCoy =

American urban planner and educator

- Born: Margarita Piel; May 25, 1923; Long Island, New York, United States
- Died: March 31, 2016 (aged 92); La Habra Heights, California, United States
- Education: Boston University; University of Southern California
- Occupations: Urban planner Educator
- Employer(s): California State Polytechnic University, Pomona; University of Southern California
- Spouse(s): Alfred Mudge McCoy, Jr. (m. 1941)
- Children: Alfred William McCoy (son); Lady Margarita Ground (daughter)
- Parents: Rudolf Alfred Piel (father); Margarita Schiele (mother)
- Relatives: Piel Brothers

Margarita Piel McCoy (May 25, 1923 — March 31, 2016) was an American urban planner and educator. McCoy was among the first women in the United States to achieve academic tenure as a professor of urban planning, and the first to chair an urban planning department.

== Career ==
Born to Rudolf Alfred Piel and Margarita Schiele, both from brewing families, McCoy is a descendant of the originators of Piels Beer. After finishing high school in Garden City, New York, in 1940, she attended Wells College and Northwestern University. However, McCoy ultimately transferred to Boston University, where she received in Bachelor of Arts in 1944.

In 1959, she began her career by serving as the planning commissioner for Sudbury, Massachusetts. In 1970, McCoy received her Master of Urban Planning from the University of Southern California Sol Price School of Public Policy. McCoy taught at California State Polytechnic University, Pomona, where she served as Chair of the Department of Urban and Regional Planning (1977-1983), as well as at the University of Southern California. She retired in 1989.

McCoy was an active member of the Association of Collegiate Schools of Planning (ACSP), the American Planning Association (APA), the Planning Accreditation Board (PAB), and the American Institute of Certified Planners (AICP) of which she was president from 1981-1982 and was named fellow.

In 1998, the ACSP established the Margarita McCoy Award, which biannually recognizes individuals who have made an outstanding contribution toward the advancement of women in planning at institutions of higher education through service, teaching, and/or research. Notable winners have included Eugenie L. Birch (1995), Karen R. Polenske (2001), Dolores Hayden (2006), and Daphne Spain (2008).

== Awards ==
- 2006 - American Planning Association National Women in Planning Award
- 2008 - University of Southern California Sol Price School of Public Policy Alumni Guardian Award
- 2018 - American Planning Association National Planning Excellence Planning Pioneers Award

== Personal life ==
McCoy married Alfred Mudge McCoy, Jr. on June 10, 1941 in Concord, Massachusetts.
