= Alfred W. McCoy =

American historian (born 1945)

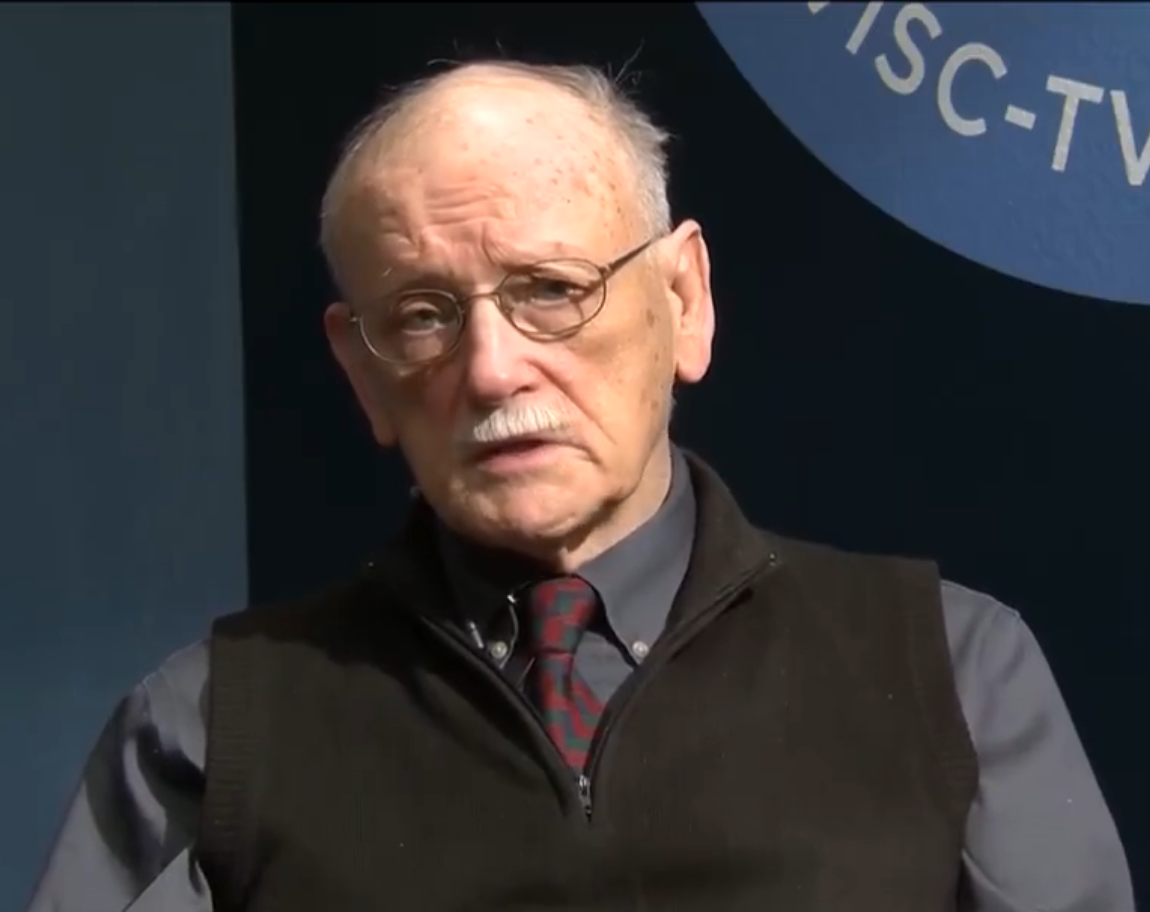
- McCoy in 2026
- Born: Alfred William McCoy; June 8, 1945 (age 81); Concord, Massachusetts, U.S.
- Occupation: Educator
- Parent: Margarita Piel

Academic background
- Education: Columbia University (BA); University of California, Berkeley (MA); Yale University (PhD)
- Thesis: Yloilo: Factional Conflict in a Colonial Economy, Iloilo Province, Philippines, 1937-1955 (1977)
- Doctoral advisor: Harold C. Conklin

Academic work
- Discipline: Historian
- Institutions: Yale University; University of New South Wales; University of Wisconsin–Madison
- Doctoral students: Temario Rivera (1994); Mai Na Lee
- Main interests: History of the Philippines; Foreign policy of the United States; European colonisation of Southeast Asia; Illegal drug trade Central Intelligence Agency covert operations
- Notable works: The Politics of Heroin in Southeast Asia (1972)

Alfred William McCoy (born June 8, 1945) is an American historian and educator. He is the Fred Harvey Harrington Professor of History at the University of Wisconsin–Madison. He specializes in the history of the Philippines, foreign policy of the United States, European colonisation of Southeast Asia, illegal drug trade, and Central Intelligence Agency covert operations.

== Early life and education ==
Alfred W. McCoy was born in Concord, Massachusetts, to Alfred Mudge McCoy, Jr. and Margarita Piel McCoy, an urban planner, educator, and descendant of the originators of Piels Beer.

McCoy graduated from the Kent School in 1964, where he earned varsity letters in football, rowing, and wrestling. He earned a Bachelor of Arts in European History from Columbia University in 1968, a Master of Arts in Asian Studies from the University of California, Berkeley in 1969, and a Doctor of Philosophy in Southeast Asian History from Yale University in 1977. His dissertation, advised by Harold C. Conklin was entitled Yloilo: Factional Conflict in a Colonial Economy, Iloilo Province, Philippines, 1937-1955, which examined the region of Iloilo.

== Career ==
McCoy began his teaching career as a lecturer at Yale while he was still a doctoral student (1976-1977). He spent the next academic year as a research fellow at the Australian National University. McCoy remained in Australia at the University of New South Wales as a lecturer (1978-1981), senior lecturer (1981-1985), and was eventually promoted to associate professor (1985-1989). He returned to the United States in 1989 as a full professor of history at the University of Wisconsin-Madison, where he has since spent his career. McCoy has been given two endowed chairs during his tenure: John R.W. Smail (2004-2015) and Fred Harvey Harrington (2015-present).

== Congressional testimony ==
As a Ph.D candidate in Southeast Asian history at Yale, McCoy testified before the United States Senate Committee on Appropriations foreign operations subcommittee on June 2, 1972, and "accused American officials of condoning and even cooperating with corrupt elements in Southeast Asia's illegal drug trade out of political and military considerations". One of his major charges was that South Vietnam's President Nguyễn Văn Thiệu, Vice President Nguyễn Cao Kỳ, and Prime Minister Trần Thiện Khiêm led a narcotics ring with ties to the Corsican mafia, the Trafficante crime family in Florida, and other high level military officials in South Vietnam, Cambodia, Laos, and Thailand. Those implicated by McCoy included Laotian Generals Ouane Rattikone and Vang Pao and South Vietnamese Generals Đặng Văn Quang and Ngô Dzu. He told the subcommittee that these military officials facilitated the distribution of heroin to American troops in Vietnam and addicts in the United States. According to McCoy, the Central Intelligence Agency chartered Air America aircraft and helicopters in northern Laos to transport opium harvested by their "tribal mercenaries". He also accused United States Ambassador to Laos G. McMurtrie Godley of blocking the assignment of Bureau of Narcotics officials to Laos in order to maintain the Laotian government's cooperation in military and political matters. A spokesman for the United States Department of State responded to the allegations: "We are aware of these charges but we have been unable to find any evidence to substantiate them, much less proof."

== Documenting the Marcos dictatorship ==
McCoy's work on the administration of Philippine President Ferdinand Marcos has influenced not only the academic documentation regarding the dictatorship, but in some cases had a direct impact on the actual events - such as the publication in the New York Times of his investigation on Marcos' "fake medals", just week before the 1986 Philippine presidential election and Marcos' eventual ouster during the People Power Revolution.

== Awards ==
- 1985 - Philippine National Book Award
- 1995 - Philippine National Book Award
- 1998 - Fulbright-Hays Faculty Research Abroad
- 2001 - Philippine National Book Award
- 2001 - Association for Asian Studies, Grant Goodman Prize
- 2004 - University of Wisconsin Graduate School, J.R.W. Smail Chair in History
- 2011 - Association for Asian Studies, George Kahin Prize
- 2012 - Yale Graduate School Alumni Association, Wilbur Cross Medal
- 2012 - University of Wisconsin-Madison, Hilldale Award for Arts and Humanities

== Filmography ==
Film credits include:

Year	Film	Role
2003	Plan Colombia: Cashing In on the Drug War Failure	Self
2007	Ghosts of Abu Ghraib	Self
2007	Taxi to the Dark Side	Self
2011	War on Terror	Self
2019	Clean Torture: An American Fabrication	Self

Television credits include:

Year	Television show	Role
2009-2022	Democracy Now!	Self
2017	On Contact	Self

== Bibliography ==
=== Books ===
- Laos: War and Revolution, with Nina S. Adams. New York: Harper & Row (1970).
- The Politics of Heroin in Southeast Asia: CIA Complicity in the Global Drug Trade. New York: Harper & Row (1972).
- Priests on Trial: Father Gore and Father O'Brien Caught in the Crossfire Between Dictatorship and Revolution. New York: Penguin Books (1984).
- Closer Than Brothers: Manhood at the Philippine Military Academy. New Haven: Yale University Press (1999).
- A Question of Torture: CIA Interrogation, from the Cold War to the War on Terror. New York: Metropolitan Books (2006). ISBN 978-0805082487.
- Policing America's Empire: The United States, the Philippines, and the Rise of the Surveillance State. Madison, Wis.: University of Wisconsin Press (2009).
- Colonial Crucible: Empire in the Making of the Modern American State. Madison, Wis.: University of Wisconsin Press (2009).
- An Anarchy of Families: State and Family in the Philippines. Madison, Wis.: University of Wisconsin Press (2009).
- Torture and Impunity: The U.S. Doctrine of Coercive Interrogation. Madison, Wis.: University of Wisconsin Press (2012).
- Endless Empire: Spain's Retreat, Europe's Eclipse, America's Decline. Madison, Wis.: University of Wisconsin Press (2012).
- Beer of Broadway Fame: The Piel Family and Their Brooklyn Brewery. SUNY Press (2016).
- In the Shadows of the American Century: The Rise and Decline of US Global Power. Chicago: Haymarket Books (2017).
- To Govern the Globe: World Orders and Catastrophic Change. Chicago: Haymarket Books (2021).
- War On Drugs: Studies in the Failure of U.S. Narcotics Policy. Routledge (2021).
- Cold War on Five Continents: A Global History of Empire and Espionage. Haymarket Books (2026).

=== Articles ===
- "Flowers of Evil: The CIA and the Heroin Trade." Harper's Magazine (July 1972), pp. 47–53.
- "A Correspondence with the CIA." New York Review of Books, vol. 19, no. 4 (Sep. 21, 1972).
- "The Afghanistan Drug Lords." Convergence (Fall 1991), pp. 11–12, 14.
- "Lord of Drug Lords: One Life as Lesson for US Drug Policy." Crime, Law and Social Change, vol. 30, no. 4 (Nov. 1998), pp. 301–331.
- "Science in Dachau’s Shadow: Hebb, Beecher, and the Development of CIA Psychological Torture and Modern Medical Ethics." Journal of the History of the Behavioral Sciences, vol. 43, no. 4 (Fall 2007), pp. 401–417. doi:10.1002/jhbs.20271.
- "Searching for Significance among Drug Lords and Death Squads: The Covert Netherworld as Invisible Incubator for Illicit Commerce." Journal of Illicit Economies and Development, vol. 1, no. 1 (Jan. 14, 2019), pp. 9–22. doi:10.31389/jied.8
- "Nuclear reaction : how an article about the H-bomb landed Scientific American in the middle of the Red Scare". Scientific American. 323 (3): 71. September 2020.

=== Interviews ===
- "Alfred McCoy Interviewed." Interview by Nelson Benton. CBS Morning News (Aug. 8, 1972).
- "An Interview with Alfred W. McCoy." Interview by Frank McGee. Today Show (NBC) (Aug. 15, 1972).
- "Name: Alfred McCoy, Occupation: Author." Interview by John Stapleton. The Tagg File (1980), pp. 5, 7–8, 10–11. Full transcript.
- "The Future of the American Empire." Interview by Nick Turse. The Nation (Nov. 24, 2017).
- Alfred McCoy's interviews on Democracy Now!

== See also ==
- Allegations of CIA drug trafficking
