= CIA drug trafficking allegations =

Central Intelligence Agency (CIA)

The Central Intelligence Agency (CIA) has been accused of involvement in the illegal drug trade. Several works on the subject have received significant attention, including those written by historian Alfred W. McCoy, professor and diplomat Peter Dale Scott, journalists Gary Webb and Alexander Cockburn, and writer Larry Collins. These claims have led to investigations by the federal government of the United States, including hearings and reports by the House of Representatives, Senate, Department of Justice, and the CIA's Inspector General. Their investigations have generally noted that there is no clear evidence CIA itself had ever directly engaged in drug trafficking, although there may have been instances of the organization being indirectly complicit in the activities of others.

== Background ==
According to Tim Weiner, the Central Intelligence Agency "has been accused of forming alliances of convenience with drug traffickers around the world in the name of anti-Communism" since its creation in 1947.

In the early 1970s, Alfred McCoy "accused American officials of condoning and even cooperating with corrupt elements in Southeast Asia's illegal drug trade out of political and military considerations" and stated that the CIA was knowingly involved in the production of heroin in the Golden Triangle of Burma, Thailand, and Laos. The United States Department of State responded to the initial allegations stating that they were "unable to find any evidence to substantiate them, much less proof". Subsequent investigations by the Inspector General of the CIA, United States House Committee on Foreign Affairs, and United States Senate Select Committee to Study Governmental Operations with Respect to Intelligence Activities (i.e. the Church Committee) also found the charges to be unsubstantiated.

In the 1980s, American journalists Anthony Avirgan and Martha Honey claimed that the perpetrator of the La Penca bombing was linked to a drug-financed "Secret Team" of FDN Contras and CIA agents. The Christic Institute then filed a $24 million civil suit on behalf of Avirgan and Honey charging 30 defendants—including CIA officials—of illegally participating in assassinations, as well as arms and drug trafficking. A judge for the United States District Court for the Southern District of Florida found that the plaintiffs "made no showing of existence of genuine issues of material fact" and ordered the Christic Institute to pay over $1 million in attorneys fees and court costs. The United States Court of Appeals for the Eleventh Circuit affirmed the ruling, and the Supreme Court of the United States let the judgment stand by refusing to hear an additional appeal.

In a 1988 interview with Frontline titled "Guns, Drugs, and the CIA", Victor Marchetti, former special assistant to CIA deputy director Rufus Taylor, stated, "It goes all the way back to the predecessor organization OSS and its involvement with the Italian mafia, the Cosa Nostra in Sicily and Southern Italy. Later on when they were fighting communists in France … they got in tight with the Corsican brotherhood. The Corsican brotherhood of course were big dope dealers. As things changed in the world the CIA got involved with the Kuomintang types in Burma who were drug runners because they were resisting the drift towards communism there. The same thing happened in Southeast Asia, later in Latin America. Some of the very people who are the best sources of information, who are capable of accomplishing things and the like happen to be the criminal element."

In August 1996, Gary Webb's three-part series of articles titled Dark Alliance was published by the San Jose Mercury News. Webb's series raised allegations that U.S. government officials—including Central Intelligence Agency (CIA) and Department of Justice (DOJ) employees—either ignored or protected drug dealers in Southern California who were associated with the Nicaraguan Contras. Investigation by the United States Department of Justice Office of the Inspector General, Central Intelligence Agency Office of Inspector General, and United States House Permanent Select Committee on Intelligence rejected the main charges.

== France ==
Illegal labs producing heroin were first discovered near Marseille, France, in 1937. These labs were run by Corsican gang leader Paul Carbone. For years, the Corsican underworld had been involved in the manufacturing and trafficking of heroin, primarily to the United States. It was this heroin network that eventually became known as "the French Connection". The Corsican Gang was protected by the CIA and the SDECE after World War II in exchange for working to prevent French Communists from bringing the Old Port of Marseille under their control.

== Golden Triangle (Southeast Asia) ==
During the Korean War, the first allegations of CIA drug trafficking surfaced after 1949, stemming from a deal whereby arms were supplied to Chiang Kai-shek's defeated generals in exchange for intelligence. Later in the same region, while the CIA was sponsoring a "Secret War" in Laos from 1961 to 1975, it was openly accused of trafficking heroin in the Golden Triangle area.

To fight its "Secret War" against the Pathet Lao communist movement of Laos, the CIA used the Miao/Meo (Hmong) population. Because of the war, the Hmong depended upon opium poppy cultivation for hard currency. The Plain of Jars had been captured by Pathet Lao fighters in 1964, which resulted in the Royal Lao Air Force being unable to land its C-47 transport aircraft on the Plain of Jars for opium transport. The Royal Laotian Air Force had almost no light planes that could land on the dirt runways near the mountaintop poppy fields. Having no way to transport their opium, the Hmong were faced with economic ruin. Air America, a CIA front organization, was the only airline available in northern Laos. Alfred McCoy writes, "According to several unproven sources, Air America began flying opium from mountain villages north and east of the Plain of Jars to CIA asset Hmong General Vang Pao's headquarters at Long Tieng."

Air America was alleged to have profited from transporting opium and heroin on behalf of Hmong leader Vang, or of "turning a blind eye" to the Laotian military doing it. This allegation has also been supported by former Laos CIA paramilitary Anthony Poshepny (aka Tony Poe), former Air America pilots, and other people involved in the war. It is portrayed in the movie Air America. Larry Collins alleged:

During the Vietnam War, U.S. operations in Laos were largely a CIA responsibility. The CIA's surrogate there was a Laotian general, Vang Pao, who commanded Military Region 2 in northern Laos. He enlisted 30,000 Hmong tribesmen in the service of the CIA. These tribesmen continued to grow, as they had for generations, the opium poppy. Before long, someone—there were unproven allegations that it was a Mafia family from Florida—had established a heroin drug refinery lab in Region Two. The lab's production was soon being ferried out on the planes of the CIA's front airline, Air America. A pair of BNDD (the predecessor of the U.S. Drug Enforcement Administration) agents tried to seize an Air America [aircraft]."

Further documentation of CIA-connected Laotian opium trade was provided by Rolling Stone magazine in 1968, and by Alfred McCoy in 1972. McCoy stated that:

In most cases, the CIA's role involved various forms of complicity, tolerance or studied ignorance about the trade, not any direct culpability in the actual trafficking ... [t]he CIA did not handle heroin, but it did provide its drug lord allies with transport, arms, and political protection. In sum, the CIA's role in the Southeast Asian heroin trade involved indirect complicity rather than direct culpability.

However, aviation historian William M. Leary, writes that Air America was not involved in the drug trade, citing Joseph Westermeyer, a physician and public health worker resident in Laos from 1965 to 1975, that "American-owned airlines never knowingly transported opium in or out of Laos, nor did their American pilots ever profit from its transport." Aviation historian Curtis Peebles also denies that Air America employees were involved in opium transportation.

=== CIA response ===
Following a 2009 FOIA request, the 2006 document "Undercover Armies: CIA and Surrogate Warfare in Laos" was released. Former CIA Operations Officer in Vietnam and CIA historian Thomas Ahern wrote, drawing from his own recollection, that local tribesmen being trained by the CIA were prohibited from carrying opium on U.S. chartered flights. Only large packages were inspected, so that small amounts of opium for local consumption might have been carried by individuals, but the prohibition of commercial traffic was unequivocal.

== United States ==
During a PBS Frontline investigation, DEA field agent Hector Berrellez said, "I believe that elements working for the CIA were involved in bringing drugs into the country ... I know specifically that some of the CIA contract workers, meaning some of the pilots, in fact were bringing drugs into the U.S. and landing some of these drugs in government military air bases. And I know so because I was told by some of these pilots that in fact they had done that."

Several journalists state that the CIA used Mena Intermountain Municipal Airport in Arkansas to smuggle weapons and ammunition to the Contras in Nicaragua, and drugs back into the United States. Some theories have claimed the involvement of political figures Oliver North, then-vice president and former CIA director George H. W. Bush, and then Arkansas governor Bill Clinton.

The CIA's self-investigation, overseen by the CIA's inspector general, stated that the CIA had no involvement in or knowledge of any illegal activities that may have occurred in Mena. The report said that the agency had conducted a training exercise at the airport in partnership with another federal agency and that companies located at the airport had performed "routine aviation-related services on equipment owned by the CIA".

== Nicaragua ==
In 1986, the United States Senate Committee on Foreign Relations began investigating drug trafficking from Central and South America and the Caribbean to the United States. The investigation was conducted by the Sub-Committee on Terrorism, Narcotics, and International Operations, chaired by Senator John Kerry, so its final 1989 report was known as the Kerry Committee report. The Report concluded that "it is clear that individuals who provided support for the Contras were involved in drug trafficking, the supply network of the Contras was used by drug trafficking organizations, and elements of the Contras themselves knowingly received financial and material assistance from drug traffickers."

In 1996, Gary Webb wrote a series of articles published in the San Jose Mercury News, which investigated Nicaraguans linked to the CIA-backed Contras who had smuggled cocaine into the U.S. which was then distributed as crack cocaine into Los Angeles and funneled profits to the Contras. His articles asserted that the CIA was aware of the cocaine transactions and the large shipments of drugs into the U.S. by the Contra personnel and directly aided drug dealers to raise money for the Contras. The Los Angeles Times, The New York Times, and The Washington Post launched their own investigations and rejected Webb's allegations. In May 1997, The Mercury News executive editor Jerry Ceppos, who had approved the series, published a column that acknowledged shortcomings in the series reporting, editing, and production, while maintaining the story was correct "on many important points". Webb later published a book based on the series, Dark Alliance: The CIA, the Contras, and the Crack Cocaine Explosion. An internal CIA journal denounces continued support for Webb and echoing of his claims, saying one supporter "twists and misinterprets to conform to his preconceived notions".

== Mexico ==
In October 2013, the American television network Fox News alleged that CIA operatives were involved in the kidnapping and murder of DEA covert agent Enrique Camarena, because he was a threat to the agency's drug operations in Mexico in the 1980s. According to the network, this information was provided to them by multiple sources, specifically two former federal agents and an ex-CIA contractor in interviews. According to all three alleged sources the CIA was collaborating with drug traffickers bringing cocaine and marijuana into the United States, and using its share of the profits to finance the Contra rebels attempting to overthrow Nicaragua's Leftist Sandinista government. The CIA spokesman responding to the allegations called it "ridiculous" to suggest that the agency had anything to do with the murder of a US federal agent or the escape of his alleged killer.

=== Torture and murder of Kiki Camarena ===
A number of former DEA agents, CIA agents, Mexican police officers, and historians contend that the CIA was complicit in the murder of Drug Enforcement Administration agent Kiki Camarena in 1985. Between 2013 and 2015, the Mexican newspaper Proceso, journalist Jesús Esquivel, journalists Charles Bowden and Molly Malloy, and historians Russell and Silvia Bartley published investigative reports and books making the same allegation. They wrote that Camarena, like Mexican journalist Manuel Buendía, discovered that the CIA helped organize drug trafficking from Mexico into the United States in order to fund the anti-communist Contras in Nicaragua as a part of the Cold War. Historian Wil Pansters explained that US victory in the Cold War was more important to the CIA than the DEA's war on drugs:

Since the overriding concern of the CIA was the anti-Sandinista project, it trumped the DEA's task of combating drug trafficking, and covertly incorporated (or pressured) parts of the Mexican state into subservience. Buendía had found out about the CIA-contra-drugs-DFS connection, which seriously questioned Mexican sovereignty, while Camarena learned that the CIA had infiltrated the DEA and sabotaged its work so as to interfere with the clandestine contra-DFS-traffickers network. They knew too much and were eliminated on the orders of the U.S. with Mexican complicity. Later official investigations attempted to limit criminal responsibility to the dirty connections between drug traffickers, secret agents and corrupt police, leaving out the (geo)political ramifications.

In 2019, the United States Department of Justice began reinvestigating Camarena's murder, and in 2020, Amazon Studios released a documentary, The Last Narc, supporting the allegations, and implicating Félix Rodríguez. The CIA has said the allegations are untrue. In a blog post, Camarena biographer Elaine Shannon described the allegations as a "Deep State conspiracy theory", and interviewed former DEA agent Jack Lawn, who agreed with her.

The notion of CIA involvement in Camarena's murder has received wide currency in Latin America.

== Honduras ==
The Honduran drug lord Juan Matta-Ballesteros was the owner of SETCO, an airline which the Nicaraguan Contras used to covertly transport military supplies and personnel in the early 1980s. Writers such as Peter Dale Scott and Jonathan Marshall have suggested that the U.S. government's desire to conceal or protect these clandestine shipments led it to close the DEA office in Honduras when an investigation began into SETCO, allowing Matta-Ballesteros to continue and expand his trafficking.

== Venezuela ==
In 1990, a failed CIA anti-drug operation in Venezuela resulted in at least a ton of cocaine being smuggled into the United States and sold on the streets. The incident, which was first made public in 1993, was part of a plan to assist an undercover agent to gain the confidence of a Colombian drug cartel. The plan involved the unsupervised shipment of hundreds of pounds of cocaine from Venezuela. The drug in the shipments was provided by the Venezuelan anti-drug unit which was working with the CIA, using cocaine seized in Venezuela. The shipments took place despite the objections of the U.S. DEA. When the failed plan came to light, the CIA officer in charge of the operation resigned, and his supervisor was transferred. The CIA issued a statement on the incident saying there was "poor judgment and management on the part of several C.I.A. officers".

In addition, the former Venezuelan anti-narcotics chief General Ramon Guillen Davila and his chief civilian aide were both indicted in connection with the shipments. Because Venezuela does not extradite its citizens, Guillen was not tried in the U.S., but his civilian aide was arrested while in the United States and sentenced to 20 years.

== Afghanistan ==
Alfred McCoy has argued that the CIA had fostered heroin production in Afghanistan for decades to finance operations aimed at containing the spread of communism, and later to finance operations aimed at containing the spread of the Islamic state. McCoy alleges that the CIA protects local warlords and incentivizes them to become drug lords. In his book Politics of Heroin, McCoy alleges CIA complicity in the global drug trade in Afghanistan, Southeast Asia, Central America, and Colombia, arguing that the CIA follows a similar pattern in all their drug involvement. McCoy has also written that during the 1980s "to fight the Soviet occupation of Afghanistan, the CIA, working through Pakistan's Inter-Services Intelligence, backed Afghan warlords who used the Agency's arms, logistics, and protection to become major drug lords."

According to The New York Times, in 2006, the US Ambassador in Kabul, the CIA station chief and MI6/SIS's station chief met with Afghan President Hamid Karzai, to address allegations regarding his brother, Ahmed's involvement in the drug trade, hoping that he would agree to expel his brother from Afghanistan. Before agreeing to take such action, Karzai demanded clear evidence of his brother's involvement be presented—evidence which the US and the UK were either unwilling or unable to provide.

Then in October 2009, the New York Times published an article by Dexter Filkins, Mark Mazzetti, and James Risen who reported that unnamed former and current American officials had said Ahmed Wali Karzai had received regular payments from the CIA for eight years—starting shortly after his brother was elected President—and was involved in the trafficking of opium in Afghanistan. Ahmed Wali Karzai denied the allegations stating that he had provided intelligence to the United States but was not compensated. Mahmud Karzai told Gerald Posner: "This is being coordinated by the ISI (Pakistani intelligence service). They have been behind the assassinations of several provincial leaders who are against the Taliban. And my brother is the last major obstacle to them in the south. If they remove Ahmed Wali, the Taliban will fill the void." A CIA spokesman said: "No intelligence organization worth the name would ever entertain these kind of allegations." In an article for Washington Decoded, former CIA operations officer Merle Pribbenow said, like claims leveled toward former South Vietnamese Lieutenant General Đặng Văn Quang, the allegations against Ahmed Wali Karzai appeared to be "vague rumors unsupported by solid evidence" and he cautioned readers about accepting news based solely on anonymous sources and unsubstantiated rumors.

== Australia ==
Nugan Hand Bank was an Australian merchant bank that collapsed in 1980 after the suicide of one of its founders, Australian lawyer Francis John Nugan, resulting in a major scandal. News media suggested that the bank had been involved in illegal activities, including drug smuggling, arms deals, and providing a front for the CIA. Speculation grew when it became known that the bank had employed a number of retired United States military and intelligence officers, including former CIA director William Colby. Investors' losses and the speculation surrounding the bank's activities led to three major government investigations over the next five years. The bank's co-founder, American Michael Jon Hand, and two other bank employees were indicted for conspiring to pervert the course of justice by destroying or removing bank records. Hand fled overseas in June 1980. In 1985, a Royal Commission of Inquiry found that while the bank had committed numerous violations of banking laws, the allegations of drug-smuggling, arms dealing and involvement in CIA activities were not proven.

== In popular media ==
The 2014 movie Kill the Messenger depicted actor Jeremy Renner as Gary Webb.

In the 2015 movie Sicario, actress Emily Blunt portrays a FBI special agent who joins a government task force to bring down a Mexican drug cartel, only to discover that her CIA counterparts' true goal is to restore control of the drug trade to a single Colombian-run business.

The 2017 film American Made is a fictionalized telling of the story of Barry Seal, a pilot and Medellín Cartel drug smuggler who based his operations in Mena, Arkansas.

The 2017 FX television show Snowfall features CIA involvement in introducing cocaine and crack to Los Angeles, California.

Alternative heavy metal band System of a Down's "Prison Song"" from its 2001 album Toxicity touches upon CIA drug exchange with the line, "drug money is used to rig elections and train brutal corporate sponsored dictators around the world".

== See also ==
- CIA transnational anti-crime and anti-drug activities
- Air America (airline), an American passenger and cargo airline that was covertly owned and operated by the CIA from 1950 to 1976 and was allegedly associated with drug smuggling in Laos
  - Air America (book), a non-fiction book about the airline
  - Air America (film), an action comedy film loosely based on the history of the airline and the book
- Nugan Hand Bank, an Australian merchant bank that collapsed in 1980 with alleged involvement with the CIA, drug trafficking, and other illegal activities
- Anthony Poshepny, a CIA officer who accused the Laotian Major General Vang Pao of using the war, and CIA assets, to enrich himself through the opium trade
- Compromised-Clinton, Bush and the CIA, by Terry Reed and John Cummings. During Vietnam, Terry said he was a CIA pilot running drugs from Laos. Later at Mena Arkansas he said he was assigned to train the sons of rich South Americans to fly freighters to supply weapons to the Nicaraguan Contras. Years later, he claimed he (as a CIA contractor) ran a machinery import business in Mexico that helped distribute heroin to Mexico and the United States.
- Ike Atkinson, a former US Army sergeant and convicted drug trafficker, thought to have been a major figure in smuggling heroin into the United States from c. 1968 to 1975
- Khun Sa
- The Politics of Heroin in Southeast Asia, a 1972 book with allegations of CIA complicity in the heroin trade
- Eclipse of the Assassins
- Project MKULTRA
- War on drugs
