= Zenia Kotval =

Professor of Urban Planning

Zenia Kotval (born 1964), is a professor of Urban and Regional Planning at Michigan State University, specializing in community engagement and economic development.

== Education ==
Kotval earned her Bachelor's in Architecture (1987) at the Academy of Architecture in Mumbai, India, followed by a Masters in Regional Planning (1989), and a PhD in Regional Planning (1994), at the University of Massachusetts Amherst.

== Career ==
Kotval is a researcher and a practitioner on community engagement, economic development and brownfield development. Her research includes multiple territorial contexts, from the United States to Estonia, and in multiple teaching settings. 2003 research by Prof Kotval was pivotal in the promotion of the visions of Frank Lloyd Wright for Pittsfield and how its industrial worker housing shaped the city in particular using Wright's “Cloverleaf” design.

Building on the work of Sherry Arnstein and Patsy Healey, she advocates that economic development should be seen as a tool at the service of community improvements and inclusion, a role this is particularly important in declining areas as a means to include local populations left behind by the development process.

Her work in aid of communities facing economic hardship includes expert support to a 2017 agreement between the Kewaunee School District, Kewaunee County and Northeast Wisconsin Technical College and Dominion Energy Kewaunee Inc.

== Honors and awards ==
She is a Fellow of the American Institute of Certified Planners, a Scholar of the Fulbright Programme, and a member of the Planning Accreditation Board that is one of the recognized higher education related accreditation organizations that accredits planning programs across all American planning studies.
