= Unomásuno =

Mexican daily tabloid newspaper

- "Crítico y veraz" (English: "Critical and truthful")
- Type: Daily newspaper
- Format: Tabloid
- Owner(s): Naim Libien Kaui; Naim Libien Tella
- Founder: Manuel Becerra Acosta
- Publisher: Impulsora de Periodismo Mexicano S.A.
- Founded: 14 November 1977; 48 years ago
- Language: Spanish
- Headquarters: Gabino Barreda No. 86, Colonia San Rafael, Cuauhtémoc, Mexico City, 06470, Mexico
- Sister newspapers: Diario Amanecer
- Website: unomasuno.com.mx

Unomásuno (English: One Plus One) is a Mexican daily tabloid newspaper circulated in Mexico City. Formed in 1977 by former employees of Mexico City's daily newspaper Excélsior, it became one of the leading leftist newspapers in Mexico during the late 1970s and early 1980s. The newspaper covered investigative topics that were often avoided by the rest of the Mexican press at the time, and it was a harsh critic of the Mexican government. By the mid-1980s, disagreements over the newspaper's management style led to internal divisions. Those who disagreed with Unomásuno and its future initiatives left in 1984 and formed La Jornada, another leftist daily in Mexico City.

In the late 1980s, Unomásuno was a victim of a backlash from the Mexican government for publishing articles highlighting a growing opposition faction within Mexico's dominant political party, the Institutional Revolutionary Party (PRI). Its founder was threatened with prison for tax evasion, and the newspaper was forced to pay hefty fines. In 1989, its founder sold the newspaper to a PRI-affiliated businessman. Under the new ownership, Unomásuno became a propaganda organ for the PRI and published articles criticizing leftist opposition groups. Its circulation declined drastically over the years, and although Unomásuno was resold in 1998, it continued to experience financial difficulties.

In 2002, two businessmen from the State of Mexico bought Unomásuno for MXN$5 million. The new management promised to help return the newspaper to its heyday, but its readership continued to decline. Several of its journalists complained the new owners were forcing employees to self-censor and to avoid writing critical articles about certain politicians. In 2015 the United States Department of the Treasury sanctioned Unomásuno under the Foreign Narcotics Kingpin Designation Act. The newspaper's owner was accused of having ties with, and providing support to, Los Cuinis, a drug trafficking group in Jalisco allied with the Jalisco New Generation Cartel.

== Background and origins ==
Unomásuno is a Mexican daily tabloid-style newspaper based in Mexico City. Its name originated from the idea that the contributions of a reporter and the participation of readers were meant to be one. In Spanish, "one plus one" is spelled uno más uno; by joining them together as Unomásuno, the founders were symbolizing the unification of both concepts. The newspaper was formed on 14 November 1977, by Manuel Becerra Acosta, a journalist who worked for the newspaper Excélsior. Excélsior, known for its critical stances against the Mexican government, was headed by Julio Scherer García throughout the 1960s and '70s. (Note: Julio Scherer García joined Excélsior in 1951. He held various positions within the newspaper until he became general editor in 1968. He held this position until 1976.) The Excélsior team he hired was made up of independent and critically minded reporters. Its articles appealed to Mexican readers because of their independent viewpoints and the newspaper's criticism of government officials. The government was particularly concerned with Excélsior's coverage of the mass murder of student protestors by the Mexican Army in 1968. To end its critical stance against the government, the administration of Mexican President Luis Echeverría (1970–1976) channeled money to the newspaper's employees to stage a coup against Scherer García. Excélsior's staff was already divided internally, and the newspaper was having financial problems because of poor management. On 8 July 1976, at least 250 staff members walked out of the Excélsior offices in Mexico City, the majority of them permanently.

During the administration of Mexican President José López Portillo (1976–1982), several laws were passed which eased politics from government control. In 1977, the Congress of the Union passed a law legalizing all political parties in Mexico, including those that were left-wing and communist. This political change led to changes in the Mexican press. Leftist perspectives, which were previously denied a venue, began to have more media representation. Mexican daily life also received unprecedented coverage in the media. The internal strife in Excélsior led to the formation of two leftist media outlets: Unomásuno, headed by Becerra Acosta, and Proceso, headed by Scherer García. Unomásuno was formed by about two dozen of Excélsior's best reporters and leading editors, including Becerra Acosta, Carlos Payán Velver (es), and Carmen Lira Saade (es). The newspaper was founded in the home of Mexican politician Manuel Moreno Sánchez (es) in Lomas de Chapultepec, Mexico City, and had its first offices there. It later moved its offices to Retorno de Corregio 12 street in the Noche Buena neighborhood in Benito Juárez, Mexico City.

In its first issue on 14 November 1977, Unomásuno published a declaration on its front page titled "Our Commitment". It stated that the newspaper was born out of the "national crisis" affecting Mexican journalism. According to the declaration, the first incident that led to Unomásuno's creation occurred on 8 July 1976, when some Excélsior employees staged a coup against it after being paid by Echeverría's administration. Becerra Acosta explained that Excélsior could no longer be trusted as a credible or socially responsible outlet after this incident. Unomásuno reiterated its purpose was to bring reliable and critical information to its readers. It also stated that it would value the contributions of its employees and work to ensure the common good. It declared itself a nationalist newspaper. It said that Mexico faced an obstacle if its political and economic aims were not integrated. According to Unomásuno, this meant that Mexico would be unable to maintain its constitutional convictions or defend its rights from foreign invaders. Only a united nation, they argued, would bring the people and government together. Unomásuno concluded its declaration by stating that the daily task of journalism was to uphold those principles with factual articles.

== Initial success and factionalism ==
When it was first formed, Unomásuno's reporters were not as experienced in investigative journalism as those of other newspapers in Mexico City. However, as they began to specialize in certain investigative topics, Unomásuno brought its readers a diversity and professionalism that were not present in the Mexican press of the time. Between the late 1970s and early 1980s, Unomásuno built a reputation among its readers for being informative and fact-based. Opinion-based sections, like editorial pages, were reduced while private advertisements grew. Unomásuno was categorized as having a center-left or left-wing orientation. It was one of the leading independent leftist newspapers in Mexico. The newspaper tended to provide a closer view of Mexico's daily life, and discussed issues in the rural sector and in unions, topics that were not discussed frequency by other media outlets. Unomásuno also published articles about feminism, machismo, LBGT movements, and the rights of domestic workers. It did not shy away from using profanity and denouncing the government.

Along with Mexico City's The News, Unomásuno offered some of the most in-depth coverage of Mexico's environmental problems throughout the mid-1980s. It also tended to give more exposure to the views and statements of leaders from the now-extinct Mexican Workers' Party (PMT), the Unified Socialist Party of Mexico (PSUM), and their fusion party, the Mexican Socialist Party (PMS). Because of its pro-socialist articles, Unomásuno cultivated an image as the government's opposition across Mexico and grew in popularity in university circles. The newspaper covered local, national, and international news on a variety of topics, including business, sports, and culture. Unomásuno also offered several weekly topics, including the arts published in the section "Sábado del Cultura" (Culture Saturday); political and economic analysis in the section "Página Uno" (Page One); leisure in the section "Unoguía" (One-guide), education in the section "Universitas" (Latin: the whole, total, the universe, the world); environmental concerns in the section "Dosmiluno" (Two Thousand and One); and humor, in the section "Otromásotro" (Other Plus Another).

In 1983–1984, however, approximately 90 employees left the newspaper after a rift over Becerra Acosta's management style. They were angry because they believed Unomásuno's management had abused the good faith of its employees, had moved far from its editorial roots, that the board of directors was too conservative, and it had anti-union tendencies. They were also angry that Becerra Acosta reportedly accepted a loan from the government to help Unomásuno through its financial difficulties. (Note: According to Gerardo Albarrán de Alba, a former Unomásuno journalist, the newspaper was founded with a loan from Mexico's Secretariat of the Interior not through Banobras, a state-owned bank. This information was published in a Proceso article in 2001.) In their eyes, Unomásuno was sacrificing its autonomy by accepting the government's help. (Note: Juan Pablo Becerra-Acosta Molina, son of Manuel Becerra Acosta, wrote his version of the story in the press in July 2000. He said his father invested his own money to help the newspaper, and the "loan" was not given to Unomásuno by the Luis Echeverría administration. He claimed they were given a loan from an accredited bank. In addition, he stated the journalists who led the defection acted on their own personal interests.) Unomásuno's defectors, headed by journalists Payán, Lira Saade, Miguel Ángel Granados Chapa, Héctor Aguilar Camín, and Ricardo Alemán, formed a competing daily newspaper known as La Jornada on 19 September 1984. La Jornada established its reputation among Mexican readers as a leading opposition newspaper for its articles opposing the political establishment, while Unomásuno's readership declined and became more irrelevant nationwide throughout the start of the 1990s. Unomásuno's editorial tone moved to the political right after separating from La Jornada. It lost its independent orientation because of its ties with the government.

== Government pressure and sale ==
During the administration of Mexican President Carlos Salinas de Gortari (1988–1994), the government tried to exercise its power against Unomásuno and other media outlets after a contested general election. The government told Becerra Acosta, the newspaper's head, if he remained in Mexico he would be imprisoned for tax evasion. There were editorial and personal factors that led to this threat. Becerra Acosta and Unomásuno were the first to publish the existence of the Democratic Current (es), a leftist faction within the Institutional Revolutionary Party (PRI) that eventually broke away from the party and formed the Party of the Democratic Revolution (PRD), headed by Cuauhtémoc Cárdenas, in 1989. In addition, Unomásuno published several articles on the case of Manuel Buendía, an investigative journalist murdered in 1984. The articles criticized the government for trying to cover up the investigation and for its determination to close the case.

Salinas de Gortari reportedly grew angry with these articles and pressured Unomásuno to pay hefty governmental fines for tax evasion. Unomásuno recognized it was unable to pay them, and several financiers close to the PRI bought corporate stock and developed a plan to help refinance the newspaper. Becerra Acosta had experienced difficulties at Unomásuno in the third week of February 1989. According to newspaper employees, they had asked management for better labor conditions and to reinstate their union, which had been inactive since 1987. When several employees led a strike to protest their working conditions, Gutiérrez Rodríguez fired the group leaders on the spot. Becerra Acosta promised to look into the possibility of increasing his employees' salary and helping them create a new union. However, a day later, on 23 February 1989, rumors spread within Unomásuno's offices the newspaper was going through financial difficulties.

According to figures from the Secretariat of Finance and Public Credit (SHCP) and the Paper Producer and Importer (PIPSA), Unomásuno owed the government MXN$40 million in taxes. Becerra Acosta sold Unomásuno in March 1989 and was reportedly given US$1 million by the Secretariat of the Interior for agreeing to step down. After that, he met with several of his most trusted associates in his home and told them he was leaving the country. He then went into exile for the remainder of Salinas de Gotari's administration. Although Becerra Acosta left Mexico, he was not free of persecution. While driving through the eastern Pyrenees mountain range in Andorra, he was assaulted. His attackers stole a document detailing his expulsion from Mexico. Upon his return to Mexico in the early 1990s, Becerra Acosta was no longer part of Unomásuno. He eventually returned to Spain and lived there for the rest of his life. (Note: Manuel Becerra Acosta died of a cardiac arrest in Cantabria, Santander, Spain, on 23 June 2000.)

== New ownerships and decline ==
=== Late 1980s–2002 ===
On 3 March 1989, Luis Gutiérrez Rodríguez replaced Becerra Acosta as the new head of Unomásuno. He had been a close associate of Becerra Acosta for several years and previously held the role of general manager at Unomásuno. He was a seasoned political reporter, an associate of PRI politician Fernando Gutiérrez Barrios, and a close friend of Salinas de Gortari. Gutiérrez Rodríguez initially tried to conceal Becerra Acosta's exile by claiming that Becerra Acosta had personally chosen him as his successor. However, by the end of the year, rumors spread that Gutiérrez Rodríguez and Salinas de Gotari had worked together and pressured Becerra Acosta to step down from his post. Gutiérrez Rodríguez rejected that notion saying there were no external factors leading to Becerra Acosta's departure. With new ownership, Unomásuno became a pro-Salinas de Gortari newspaper and government propaganda organ for the PRI.

Under Gutiérrez Rodríguez, Unomásuno tried to discredit La Jornada, which criticized the PRI government and supported the movements of the Mexican left. La Jornada supported Cárdenas' political campaigns, the rebellion of the Zapatista Army of National Liberation (EZLN) in the early 1990s, and stood against other ideas promoted by the PRI government it believed were regressing Mexico, like neoliberalism. Unomásuno's efforts to sway public opinion were largely unsuccessful, however, as Mexican public opinion continued to favor independent media outlets like La Jornada. Gutiérrez Rodríguez promised his employees that Unomásuno's political stance and editorial tone would not change. Several reporters analyzed articles printed by the newspaper and tried to show Gutiérrez Rodríguez their critical attitudes towards the Salinas de Gotari administration had changed. They showed him that in one of its recent articles, Unomásuno stated that in the first 100 days of the Salinas de Gortari administration, Mexico had a strong government and a clear sense of direction. In addition, Unomásuno's attitude towards its staff changed with the new ownership. In March 1989, Gutiérrez Rodríguez warned his employees that Unomásuno was "now a business" and not a "club of friends". He said he would look into the creation of a union with the board of trustees, but told those interested in it they should ponder whether they worked hard enough to earn their paychecks before asking for more money.

Four-and-a-half years later, on 28 November 1993, Unomásuno formed an alliance with a financial group headed by Mexican businessman Jacobo Zaidenweber. Zaidenweber acquired 69% of the company's share capital from Editorial Uno, Unomásuno''s editorial branch. The transaction cost approximately MXN$9.6 million. At the time of the purchase, Unomásuno's net worth was US$4.5 million. On 3 February 1994, Unomásuno created a new board of trustees that included Zaidenweber and other shareholders. However, on 22 February 1995, without any official explanation, the financial group decided to cut ties with the newspaper. By 1995–1996, Unomásuno had a daily circulation of only 6,000, while other Mexico City newspapers like Excélsior and La Jornada had 40,000 and 80,000 respectively. At least 60% of its revenue during that time came from government advertising, and a high percentage of its employees received bribes. On 5 January 1998, Gutiérrez Rodríguez sold his Unomásuno stocks to Manuel Alonso Muñoz and his son Manuel Alonso Coratella and received approximately US$3 million for the transaction.

In May 2002, Unomásuno fired 70 employees, including four of its founders: Christa Cowrie, Jorge Reyes Estrada, Fernando Belmont Acero, and Patricia Cardona. Most of them accepted the 33% severance plan the newspaper offered; the paper did not have the money to pay them what was required by law. The founders and eleven more employees, however, sued Unomásuno and asked the company to fully pay for their severance plan. The employees wrote a petition stating they were fired because PRI politician Francisco Labastida Ochoa was not winning the 2000 presidential race. They claimed the owners poured a lot of money into his campaign, including money that was to be used to pay its employees' severance. Alonso Muñoz told the press that Unomásuno was going through financial difficulties and he was thinking of selling the newspaper. The newspaper had MXN$85 million in debt and MXN$20 million in assets; a negative net worth of MXN$65 million. Alonso Muñoz said he was considering partnering with Alonso Coratella's Mundo Ejecutivo media group and starting a new era for Unomásuno.

=== 2002–present ===
On 19 November 2002, Alonso Coratella confirmed the newspaper was acquired by Naim Libien Kaui and his son Naim Libien Tella, two Mexican businessmen of Lebanese descent from the State of Mexico. (Note: Both of them bought Impulsora de Periodismo Mexicano S.A., a publishing company owned by Manuel Alonso Muñoz. This company owned Editorial Uno and Unomásuno.) They bought 99.97% of the company's stock for MXN$5 million. The price was drastically low compared to its market price of MXN$19.2 million. The acquisition included the ownership to Unomásuno's name and several other company names, like Sábado, Páginauno, Másturismo, Deportemásuno, Asterisco Comunicaciones, Siglo Mexicano, and Motoruno. It also included three private properties owned by the newspaper. The Libien family agreed to take care of Unomásuno's debt of MXN$150 million, as well as guarantee the future of the newspaper and the collective agreement with its employees. The acquisition came after President Vicente Fox (2000–2006) came into office and ordered the government to remove its advertising from newspapers across Mexico. The government decided instead to place its advertising on radio and television. This decision affected several newspapers across Mexico; some had no other option but to reduce their circulation and content. Others, like Unomásuno, were forced to sell to prevent more financial problems.

The Libien family said they would help bring Unomásuno to the forefront of Mexico's media by hiring credible and well-known journalists. Several of Unomásuno''s employees, however, protested against the acquisition and said the Libien family was not good for the newspaper's future. They complained the family wanted its employees to do a "light" form of journalism that was susceptible to blackmail and corruption. In the first 24 days of the acquisition, the Libien family decided to declare Unomásuno insolvent and thus avoid liquidation. The editorial house of Unomásuno, Editorial Uno, was closed. Publishing duties were then transferred to another newspaper, La Tarde, located in San Rafael, Mexico City. Libien stopped paying several of his employees during this period and removed the food stamp options. He also reduced bonuses by half and tried to remove one of the two mandatory rest days. On 1 December 2002, according to six Unomásuno reporters, (Note: The six journalists were Ernesto Montero, Amalia Frías, César Aguilar, Grisel Camacho, Francelia Vargas, and Julio Cuitláhuac.) Libien told his employees they were only allowed to write about public figures and businesses willing to pay the newspaper to get coverage in the media. Those who did not pay were to be attacked by Unomásuno in its publications until they sought some sort of financial "arrangement" with the newspaper. Alonso Coratella spoke to the press on 3 December and said he was not accountable for the new management decisions, and justified the acquisition by saying the newspaper was going through financial difficulties and needed external investment. On 6 December, employees claimed management told them not to write negative articles about Fox, his wife Martha Sahagún, and SHCP head Francisco Gil Díaz.

Over 250 people held a strike outside two of Unomásuno's offices in Mexico City on 14 December - the Editorial Uno offices in Benito Juárez and in Gabino Barreda No. 86, Colonia San Rafael, where the newspaper was headquartered following the Libien family acquisition. Strikers held red and black flags, the colors of the newspaper, and protested for a labor agreement with the new management team. They said the Libiens were not respecting their salary conditions and their collective agreement. To ensure the strike was peaceful in nature, employees notified Mexico City's Secretariat of Public Security (SSP-DF). Employees shared coffee and clothes because of the low temperatures. On 18 December, Unomásuno employees marched to the Monumento a la Revolución landmark, at the Secretariat of the Interior offices, and in the Zócalo, Mexico City's main square. The purpose of this march was to make the "dishonest" actions of the new management public. A Mexico City labor tribunal declared the strike "legally existent" on 19 December. With this decision, Libien Kaui was prohibited from editing Unomásuno until its problems were resolved. The resolution also stated he violated the right to strike and other labor agreements.

In 2003, Unomásuno's circulation in Mexico City was down to 7,000 copies, greatly surpassed by several of its closes competitors. The following year, Unomásuno was not among the top newspapers in Mexico with certified daily circulation above 18,000. Its rival Excélsior was in the top half of the list with a confirmed daily circulation of 55,492. Without the benefit of financial backing from the PRI, Unomásuno was unable to increase its daily circulation. Unomásuno lost readers after the defeat of the PRI by the National Action Party (PAN) in the 2000 presidential elections. By 2005, Unomásuno's quality and readership had declined, in large part due to its articles being characterized as having a cult of personality, being yellow journalism, or for reporting gossip short-stories as factual accounts. In addition, its design was unappealing to many readers, was difficult to read, was sometimes poorly printed, and on recycled paper. It was not uncommon for readers to find mistakes on maps and prose errors.

== Money laundering activities ==
On 16 December 2015, the United States Department of the Treasury and its Office of Foreign Assets Control (OFAC) designated Libien Tella and four Mexican companies, including Unomásuno, under the Foreign Narcotics Kingpin Designation Act (also known as the "Kingpin Act"). According to the report, Libien Tella provided assistance to Los Cuinis, a drug cartel based in Jalisco, and its former leader Abigael González Valencia. Unomásuno was charged with providing assistance to the drug trafficking network of González Valencia and Los Cuinis. OFAC stated the newspaper was owned/controlled by González Valencia and/or Libien Tella. As a result of the designation, Libien Tella and Unomásuno's assets were frozen in the United States, and U.S. citizens were prohibited from engaging in business transactions with them.

OFAC stated that Libien Tella had a long business relationship with González Valencia. In 2007, González Valencia granted Libien Tella power of attorney over his Guadalajara-based investment group Valgo Grupo de Inversión. Among the other companies sanctioned were Valgo Grupo de Inversión, Libien Tella's Toluca-based newspaper Diario Amanacer (sister newspaper to Unomásuno), and Aerolineas Amanecer, an air taxi company owned by him. González Valencia worked closely with the Jalisco New Generation Cartel (CJNG), an allied criminal group based in Jalisco and headed by Nemesio Oseguera Cervantes (alias "El Mencho"), prior to his arrest in Mexico in February 2015. Mexico's Attorney General's Office (PGR) said it would analyze the evidence presented by OFAC and determine if it should pursue legal action. The PGR stated they did not have an open investigation against Libien Tella connecting him to Mexican drug trafficking groups.

In a statement to the public, Libien Tella rejected the OFAC's findings and denied any connections with Mexican drug cartels. He invited U.S. officials to closely examine Unomásuno and the rest of his businesses, and stated that his newspapers had been critical of drug trafficking groups, including Los Cuinis and the CJNG, for years. In the report, he mentioned Unomásuno, Diario Amanecer, and Aerolineas Amanecer, but made no mention of his investment group Valgo Grupo de Inversión. He stated it was likely that Mexican officials wanted to censor Unomásuno's anti-organized crime publications by providing U.S. officials with false information to link them to drug trafficking and thereby discredit their information. He concluded his statement by saying that he was open to sharing information on his businesses because the accusations affected his integrity.

=== Background and aftermath ===
Although this was the first time Libien Tella was linked to organized crime publicly, it was not the first time he had been involved with the law. On 8 October 2008, he went to a Mexico City appeals court to ask for legal protection against an arrest warrant issued by a Quintana Roo court; the crime he was accused of was unspecified. Because the Quintana Roo court lacked jurisdiction, the Mexico City appeals court granted Libien Tella a writ of amparo on 24 April 2009, giving him legal protection and absolving the arrest warrant. On 13 October 2011, Libien Tella requested another writ of amparo in a Mexico City appeals court because he was under investigation by the Assistant Attorney General's Office for Special Investigations on Organized Crime (SEIDO), Mexico's organized crime investigation agency. SEIDO had an open investigation against him and Libien Tella was worried he would be ordered to appear in court or issued an arrest warrant. Libien Tella also asked for a writ of amparo against the Federal Investigative Agency (AFI) and SEIDO's subgroup responsible for investigating money laundering, forgery, and counterfeiting. The writ of amparo was approved on 27 October 2011, after a judge considered there was no evidence against him.

Libien Tella's biggest legal case was one where the Mexican government wanted to strip Unomásuno of several of its names. The case was in 2014. According to court documents, Unomásuno was using several names (like Uno Más Uno, Unomásuno, its website domain, Uno Noticias, and Acción de México) that were owned by the Federal Treasurer's Office (TESOFE). When Libien Tella issued his version of the story to the public regarding the Kingpin Act sanction, he mentioned that the government wanted to take away Unomásuno's name and alluded to this.

On 2 September 2016, Libien Kaui was arrested by the Criminal Investigation Agency (AIC) branch of the PGR. (Note: Preliminary reports confused his arrest with his son's, Naim Libien Tella.) He had a pending arrest warrant for tax fraud charges; on 4 September, he appeared before a Mexico City federal judge for his legal declaration and was told of his charges. On 9 September, he was formally charged by a federal court for tax fraud. Libien Kaui issued a writ of amparo to a State of Mexico appeals court that same day he was arrested to prevent any legal procedures that led to his detention from taking place. However, the appeals court stated that they had no jurisdiction in the case since the arrest took place in Polanco, Mexico City. The writ of amparo was then moved to a Mexico City appeals court, but they stated they had no jurisdiction to order his release since Libien Kaui's tax residence was in Metepec, State of Mexico. The writ of amparo was then pushed to a tribunal court, but it was rejected on 13 September after Libien Kaui was formally charged.

According to court documents, Libien Kaui committed income tax fraud of MXN$11,413,886, since he did not declare his income earnings of MXN$38,215,751 in 2012. He was also accused of not reporting his earnings in 2010, 2011, and 2013. On 16 September, a federal judge granted Libien Kaui a bond of MXN$16 million, and told him that he was allowed to leave the Federal Social Readaptation Center No. 1 (also known as "Altiplano"), a maximum-security prison, until the case was settled if the amount was paid. The amount posted was calculated based on the tax fraud scheme, the monetary penalties levied, and additional court fees. The federal judge stated that his potential release was permitted by Mexican law because tax fraud charges in Mexico are not considered serious in nature. On 16 October, the judge handling his case, Vicente Antonio Bermúdez Zacarías, was murdered while he was jogging nearby his home in Metepec.

== See also ==
- Hotelito Desconocido
- List of newspapers in Mexico

== Sources ==
=== Bibliography ===
- Albarrán, Alan (2009). The Handbook of Spanish Language Media. Routledge. p. 336. ISBN 978-1135854300.
- Balderston, Daniel; Gonzalez, Mike; Lopez, Anna M. (2002). Encyclopedia of Contemporary Latin American and Caribbean Cultures. Routledge. p. 1800. ISBN 978-1134788521.
- Bartley, Russell H.; Bartley, Sylvia Erickson (2015). Eclipse of the Assassins: The CIA, Imperial Politics, and the Slaying of Mexican Journalist Manuel Buendía. University of Wisconsin. p. 532. ISBN 978-0299306403. - Read online at Google Books
- Basáñez, Miguel (1990). La lucha por la hegemonía en México, 1968–1990 (in Spanish). Siglo XXI. p. 309. ISBN 978-9682316593.
- Bethell, Leslie (1991). Mexico since Independence. Cambridge University Press. pp. 453. ISBN 978-1316583562.
- Brewster, Claire (2005). Responding to Crisis in Contemporary Mexico: The Political Writings of Paz, Fuentes, Monsiváis, and Poniatowska. University of Arizona Press. p. 265. ISBN 978-0816524914.
- CQ Press (2008). Political Handbook of the Americas. CQ Press, Original copy from the University of California. p. 705. ISBN 978-0872899032.
- Giles, Robert H.; Snyder, Robert W. (2001). 1968: Year of Media Decision. Transaction Publishers. p. 175. ISBN 978-1412815994.
- Grayson, George W. (1990). Prospects for Democracy in Mexico. Transaction Publishers. p. 310. ISBN 978-1412832205.
- Hughes, Sallie (2006). Newsrooms in Conflict: Journalism and the Democratization of Mexico. University of Pittsburgh Press. p. 296. ISBN 978-0822973041.
- Lawson, Chappell (2002). Building the Fourth Estate: Democratization and the Rise of a Free Press in Mexico. University of California Press. pp. 287. ISBN 978-0520231702.
- Lutz, Ellen L. (1990). Human Rights in Mexico: A Policy of Impunity. Human Rights Watch. pp. 89. ISBN 978-0929692623.
- Merithew, Charlene (2002). Re-presenting the nation: contemporary Mexican women writers. University Press of the South. p. 224. ISBN 978-1889431963.
- Monsiváis, Carlos (2006). A ustedes les consta: antología de la crónica en México (in Spanish). Ediciones Era. p. 546. ISBN 978-9684116665.
- Peschard-Sverdrup, Armand B.; Rioff, Sara (2005). Mexican Governance: From Single-party Rule to Divided Government. Center for Strategic and International Studies. p. 317. ISBN 978-0892064571.
- Simonian, Lane (1995). Defending the Land of the Jaguar: A History of Conservation in Mexico. University of Texas Press. pp. 326. ISBN 978-0292776913.
- Trejo, Guillermo (2012). Popular Movements in Autocracies: Religion, Repression, and Indigenous Collective Action in Mexico. Cambridge University Press. p. 339. ISBN 978-1139510233.
- Waisbord, Silvio Ricardo (2002). Latin Politics, Global Media. University of Texas Press. p. 203. ISBN 978-0292725379.
