= Telling Right from Wrong =

1985 book

- Timothy J. Cooney
- Language: English
- Subject: Philosophy, morality
- Publisher: Prometheus
- Publication date: 1985
- Publication place: United States
- Media type: Hardback
- Pages: 158 pages
- ISBN: 0879752971 First edition
- OCLC: 300578530

Telling Right from Wrong: What Is Moral, What Is Immoral and What Is Neither One nor the Other is a book by Timothy J. Cooney. In an attempt to get the book published Cooney submitted a falsified letter to Random House. This was detected prior to release and the publication offer was rescinded. Telling Right from Wrong was later published by Prometheus Books.

== Synopsis ==
The book's synopsis describes the work as an "analysis and discussion of moral language and the assumptions underlying its use. This book contends that much of our prescriptive language pertaining to issues such as gambling, abortion, capitol punishment, homosexuality, prostitution, divorce, freedom of speech and expression, pornography, and others, is devoid of moral content."

== Release ==
Cooney's prior attempts at locating a publisher for his first two books had been unsuccessful and per the New York Times, he "assumed no academic press would look at a manuscript by a philosophical autodidact." His former wife, Joan Ganz Cooney, recommended that Cooney solicit philosophy academics for a recommendation letter. Assuming that no academic would read the book as he was not in academics himself, Cooney forged a recommendation letter calling the book "truly brilliant" from Harvard professor Robert Nozick and submitted it to Random House, which then extended him a publication offer. Nozick and Random House learned of the fraud after a journal editor contacted Nozick to let him know that they had received a copy of the book, as a copy of the letter was sent out with each galley. Upon learning of the fraud, Random House withdrew their offer.

In an unsuccessful attempt to persuade Random House to continue with publication of Telling Right from Wrong Cooney issued a formal apology and also added a new chapter based on the event. The book was later published via Prometheus Books in summer 1985. The publisher condemned Cooney's actions but chose to publish the work after it was praised by two philosophers. Jonathan Lieberson, a philosopher at Barnard College, contributed substantially to the version Prometheus published. Prior to Prometheus Books picking up the book philosophy professor David L. Norton called for a boycott of Telling Right from Wrong if it were to be published.

Sidney Hook criticized Cooney's apology to Random House in his review for the New York Times, stating that there was "something disingenuous about this explanation, since he did not explore obvious ways to get a reputable philosopher to read his manuscript and recommend it on its merits." The newspaper also noted that Cooney had not attempted to self-publish the work. Hook's review was itself later criticized as the philosopher had been included in the acknowledgements page in the Prometheus Books galley; this acknowledgement was not present in the published version or mentioned in Hook's review. He also did not mention his possible involvement in the book's publication after it was dropped by Random House.

In September 1985 Cooney reported that he had was unable to get speaking engagements on college campuses. After Cooney's death Tim Madigan noted that Cooney had "never tried to justify his act of forgery, admitting that by his own standards he had committed a wrongful act, and he ruefully pointed out that he understood better than anyone how the deception put the nail in the coffin of his reputation as a spokesperson for ethical reflection."

== Reception ==
Sidney Hook reviewed Telling Right from Wrong for The New York Times, writing that "To my surprise (and without subscribing to his main thesis), I found it an uncommonly good book, far superior to scores of volumes on the subject tumbling from both university and commercial presses." This review was questioned by Carlin Romano, who pointed out that Hook had been previously credited in the acknowledgements in the book's galley as having "championed its publication after the book was dropped" and that this acknowledgement was possibly removed in the publication copy order to ensure that Hook could review the book for The New York Times. Romano further noted that The New York Times' deputy editor of the book reviews responded to questions about the acknowledgement by stating that the staff editor responsible for reading galleys and catching any potential conflict of interest "simply 'missed' it". In his own review for the book Romano criticized the text, writing "Cooney's approach, unfortunately, depends on unrealistic assumptions about our agreement on fundamental values and the likelihood of particular actions' causing destruction."

Seymour J. Mandelbaum also reviewed the work, calling it a "brash tract".
