= Eugenie L. Birch =

American scholar

Eugenie L. Birch is an American scholar and city planner specializing in international and domestic planning history and urban revitalization.

== Academic posts ==
Birch is the Lawrence C. Nussdorf Professor of Urban Research and Education and the Chair of the Graduate Group in City and Regional Planning at the University of Pennsylvania. She is also the Co-Director of the Penn Institute for Urban Research and co-editor, University of Pennsylvania's City in the 21st Century series.

== Appointments ==
Birch has served as the president for the International Planning History Society and is a member of the editorial boards of the Journal of the American Planning Association, Journal of Planning History, and Planning Perspectives. Birch is the co-editor, with Susan Wachter, of the Social Science Research Network Urban Research eJournal. She served as chair of the Planning Accreditation Board from 2004-2006. She has also been president of the Association of Collegiate Schools of Planning and the president of the Society of American City and Regional Planning History. In 2000, Birch was elected to the College of Fellows of the American Institute of Certified Planners and made a member (honorary) of the Royal Town Planning Institute.

Birch has held past teaching appointments at Rutgers University, SUNY Purchase, CUNY Graduate Center, and Hunter College, and was a visiting professor at the University of Witwatersrand and Yale University.

Birch's civic commitments include serving as chair, board of directors, Municipal Art Society of New York. She is chair, UN-HABITAT's World Urban Campaign. and the president, General Assembly of Partners (GAP), a civic engagement platform engaged in the preparations for the UN Conference on Housing and Sustainable Urban Development. In the early 1990s she was a member of the City Planning Commission, New York City and in 2002, she served on the jury to select the designers for the World Trade Center site.

== Education and awards ==
Birch received a bachelor's degree in history cum laude from Bryn Mawr College and a Master's and Ph.D. in Urban Planning from Columbia University. She held a Fulbright Fellowship to Ecuador. She is a recipient of the Journalism Prize of the American Planning Association (1994), the Margarita McCoy Award for Outstanding Contribution to Furthering Women in the Planning Academy (1994), the Jay Chatterjee Award for Distinguished Service (2006), the Planning Distinguished Educator Award (2009), the Lawrence Gerckens Award for Excellence in Planning History (2009), and the American Planning Association's President Award (2013).

== Selected works ==
=== Books ===
- Cities and Women's Health, Global Issues, Philadelphia: University of Pennsylvania Press, 2011 (edited with Afaf Meleis and Susan M. Wachter). Paperback 2013
- Global Urbanization, Philadelphia: University of Pennsylvania Press, 2011 (edited with Susan M. Wachter).
- Neighborhood and Life Chances, How Place Matters in Modern America, Philadelphia: University of Pennsylvania Press, 2011 (edited with Harriet B. Newburger and Susan M. Wachter). Paperback 2013
- Urban and Regional Planning Reader, London: Routledge: 2009

=== Selected book chapters ===
- “Anchor Institutions in the Northeast Megaregion: An Important but Not Fully Realized Resource,” in Susan M. Wachter and Kimberly Zeuli (editors), Revitalizing America's Cities (Philadelphia: University of Pennsylvania Press, forthcoming).
- “Measuring US Urban Sustainability,” in Moving to Sustainable Prosperity, State of the World 2012 (with Amy Lynch): Washington, DC: Island Press (2012)
- “Cities, People and Processes as Case Studies in Urban Planning,” in Rachel Weber and Randall Crane (editors), Oxford Handbook on Urban Planning, New York: Oxford University Press (2012).
- “Downtown Revitalization,” in Fritz Wagner and Roger Caves (editors), Livable Cities, New York: M.E. Sharpe (2012).

=== Selected articles ===
- “ Making Urban Research Intellectually Respectful, Martin Meyerson and the Harvard-MIT Joint Center, 1959-1964” Journal of Planning History 10:3 (August 2011): 219-238.
- “Reviving the Art of Biography: The Emblematic Life of Martin Meyerson,” Journal of Planning History, 10:3 (August 2011):175-179.
- “Downtown in the ‘New American City,’” in Birch and Wachter (editors), “The Shape of the New American City,” The Annals of the American Academy of Political and Social Science 626 (November, 2009): 134-153.
- “One Hundred Years of Planning,” Journal of the American Planning Association 75: 2 (Spring, 2009): 113-122 (with Christopher Silver).
- “Seymour Mandelbaum as an Intellectual Colleague, Boss Tweed’s New York as a Template,” Planning Theory 5:2 (2006): 115-120.
