= War on Terror (disambiguation) =

The war on terror is the U.S.-led international military campaign. It may also refer to the following:

- Counter-terrorism, policies and efforts by various countries
- Russian Empire's crackdown on the Anarchist Wave of the nihilist movement
- British policies during the period of anti-imperialism
- Spain's opposition to ETA and its allies
- Russian nickname in the media of the Chechen–Russian conflict
- Chinese crackdown on the Xinjiang insurgency

== Media and art ==
- War on Terror (film), Austrian documentary film
- War on Terror (game), board game
- War On Terror: KL Anarchy, Malaysian action thriller film
