= The Politics of Heroin in Southeast Asia =

1972 non-fiction book

- Author: Alfred W. McCoy; Cathleen B. Read; Leonard P. Adams II
- Language: English
- Subject: Heroin trafficking, covert operations, Central Intelligence Agency (CIA)
- Genre: Non-fiction
- Published: New York, New York
- Publisher: Harper & Row
- Publication place: United States
- Pages: 464
- ISBN: 978-0060129019
- OCLC: 482293
- Text: The Politics of Heroin in Southeast Asia online

The Politics of Heroin in Southeast Asia is a 1972 non-fiction book on heroin trafficking in Southeast Asia and alleged CIA complicity and aid to the Southeast Asian opium/heroin trade. Written by Alfred W. McCoy, the book covers the period from World War II to the Vietnam War.

== Premise ==
Politics of Heroin documents CIA complicity and aid to the Southeast Asian opium/heroin trade. The book explains that most of the world's heroin was produced in the Golden Triangle and, according to the work, transported with the complicity or indifference of United States government employees.

It is transported in the planes, vehicles, and other conveyances supplied by the United States. The profit from the trade has been going into the pockets of some of our best friends in Southeast Asia. The charge concludes with the statement that the traffic is being carried on with the indifference if not the closed-eye compliance of some American officials, and there is no likelihood of its being shut down in the foreseeable future.

Air America, covertly owned and operated by the CIA, was allegedly used to transport the illicit drugs.

The heroin supply was partially responsible for the perilous state of US Army morale in Vietnam. "By mid 1971 Army medical officers were estimating that about 10 to 15 percent of the lower-ranking enlisted men serving in Vietnam were heroin users."

Having interviewed Maurice Belleux, former head of the French intelligence agency SDECE, McCoy also uncovered parts of the French Connection scheme used by the agency to finance all of its covert operations during the First Indochina War through control of the Indochina drug trade.

== Background ==
The book was the product of eighteen months of research and at least one trip to Laos by Alfred W. McCoy.

McCoy conducted "more than 250 interviews, some of them with past and present officials of the CIA. He said that top-level South Vietnamese officials, including President Nguyen Van Thieu and Premier Tran Van Khiem, were specifically involved."

McCoy wrote Politics of Heroin while seeking a PhD in Southeast Asian history at Yale University. Cathleen B. Read (a graduate student who spent time in the region during the war) and Leonard P. Adams II are also listed as co-authors.

== Publication ==
The CIA reacted strongly to the book: "...high-ranking officials of the C.I.A have signed letters for publication to a newspaper and a magazine, granted a rare on-the-record interview at the agency's headquarters in McLean, Va." The C.I.A letters were to the Washington Star and were signed by William E. Colby and Paul C. Velte Jr. "a Washington-based official with Air America, a charter airline that flies missions for the CIA in Southeast Asia."

CIA general counsel Lawrence R. Houston wrote to the book's publishers Harper & Row and asked that they be given the galley proofs so that the CIA could criticize errors and rebut unproven accusations: "We believe we could demonstrate to you that a considerable number of Mr. McCoy's claims about this agency's alleged involvement are totally false and without foundation, a number are distorted beyond recognition and none is based on convincing evidence." and take whatever legal action they felt necessary before the book's publication.

McCoy reluctantly allowed Harper & Row to provide a copy to the CIA, who sent a list of undocumented denials and criticisms. Harper & Row's lawyers determined that the CIA's complaints about the manuscript were completely baseless and without foundation.

A vice president and general counsel of Harper & Row said "We don't have any doubts about the book at all. We've had it reviewed by others and we're persuaded that the work is amply documented and scholarly." Harper & Row published it two weeks before its scheduled release date.

=== Later editions ===
The third and expanded edition was published in 2003, more pointedly entitled The Politics of Heroin: CIA Complicity in the Global Drug Trade (ISBN 1-55652-483-8).

The book has been translated into nine languages.

== Reception ==
Publishers Weekly wrote: "Scrupulously documented...this is a valuable corrective to the misinformation being peddled by anti-drug zealots on both sides of the aisle."

The New York Times also reviewed the book.

== Quotes ==
- "We have to continue to fight the evil of Communism, and to fight you must have an army, and an army must have guns, and to buy guns you must have money. In these mountains the only money is opium." General Tuan Shi-wen, commander of the Kuomintang Fifth Army (based in the Golden Triangle), as quoted by McCoy.
- "The picture of corruption that he draws, of cruel and naked jockeying for power, of bloodletting and cynical maneuvering with underworld peddlers, is so strongly documented that it might make even the stanchest defender of the war in Southeast Asia wonder if it is worth it." Thomas Lask, "Bonanza in 'Golden Triangle'".

== See also ==
- Anthony Poshepny, a CIA operations officer who worked in Laos
- Bank of Credit and Commerce International
- Eclipse of the Assassins
- First and Second Opium Wars
- Nugan Hand Bank, a bank that collapsed in 1980 with alleged involvement with the CIA and drug trafficking
- Opium production in Afghanistan
- Peter Dale Scott#Non-fiction books
