= Christa Cowrie =

German-Mexican photographer

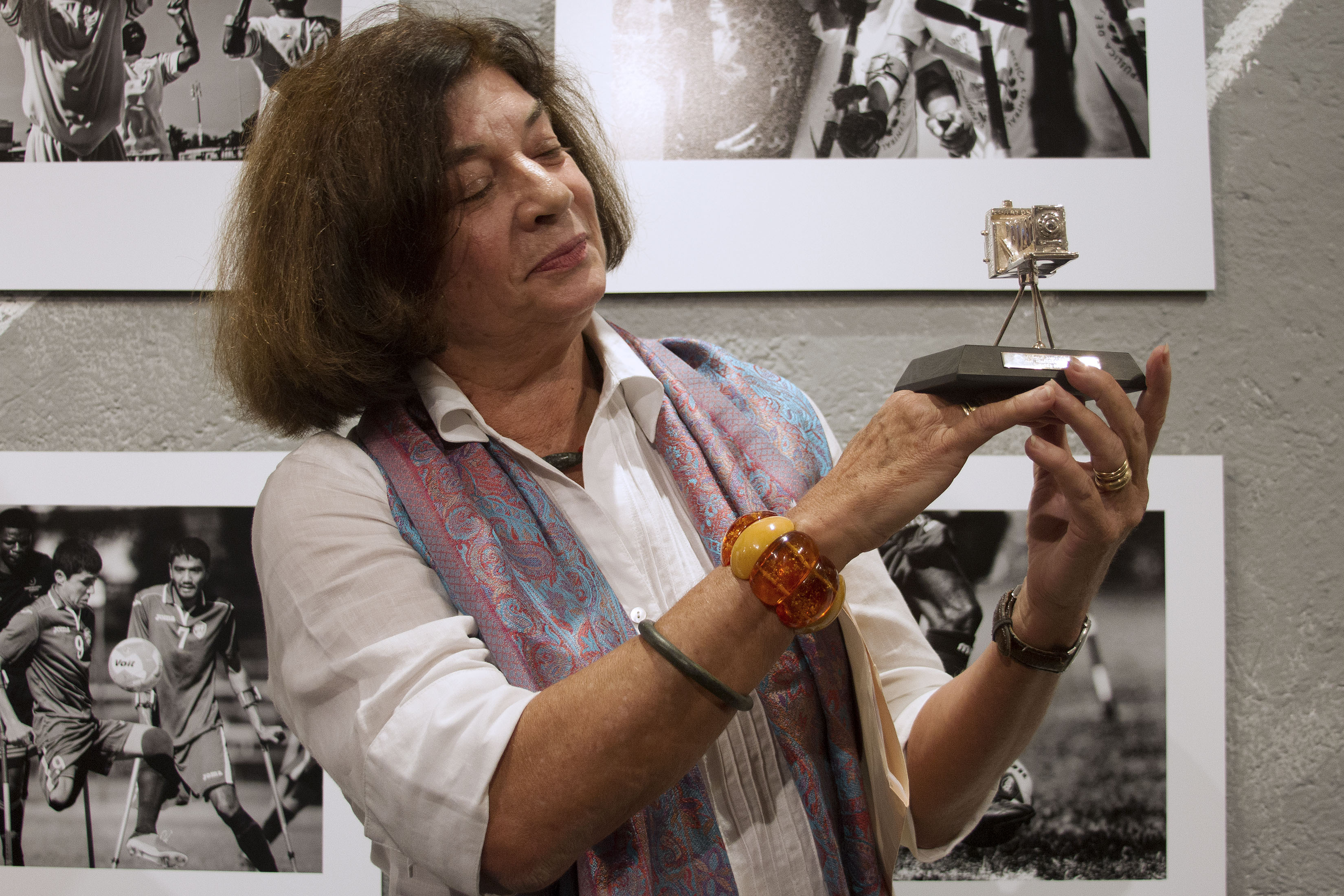
- Cowrie in 2015
- Born: 1949 (age 76–77); Hamburg, Germany
- Known for: photography of Mexican dance and theater

Christa Cowrie (born 1949) is a German-Mexican photographer, who began her career in photojournalism but is best known for her work documenting Mexico’s dance the theater events. Cowrie arrived in Mexico in 1963 and began her career in 1975 with the Excélsior newspaper. In 1977, she was one of the founders of the Unomásuno newspaper, also working to found one its supplements, focusing on ecological journalism. Her work began to shift towards photography dance and theater in the mid 1990s working with the Centro Nacional de las Artes. The archive she has created with this institution is one of the most important in Mexico documenting dance and theater. Her work has been recognized with membership in the Salón de la Plástica Mexicana.

== Life ==
Cowrie was born in Hamburg, Germany in 1949 and moved to Mexico in 1963. She studied photography with Lázaro Blanco.

== Career ==
Cowrie began her professional career as a photojournalist in 1975, creating photographic essays for the Excélsior newspaper. She was part of a group of journalists that founded the Unomásuno newspaper in 1977. With Patricia Cardonal, she created the newspaper’s supplement called Dos Mil Uno. Salud y Ecología in 1989, a pioneer in ecological journalism in Mexico. She remained the supplements graphic coordinator until 1995. From 1995 to 2002, she worked with the cultural section and the Sábado supplement of the same newspaper.

Starting in the mid 1990s, her work began to shift from journalism to the photography of theater and dance. In 1996, she began to work with the Centro de Investigación de Teatro y Danza (CITRU) and Cenidi-Danza (INBA) located at the Centro Nacional de las Artes, where she is in charge of documenting dance and theatre events in Mexico. She also manages images for this organization for publication in books, CD’s, web pages and the digital libraries. In 2002 she began collaborating with Vértigo magazine and her photographs of dance and theater have appeared in the Proceso magazine. Since the same year, she has been an official photographer of the Festival Internacional Cervantino and coordinates the photography department of this annual event.

This photography of Mexico’s scenic arts comprises one of the country’s most important archives of images of theater and dance. Cowrie’s work has been exhibited in over seventy five individual and collective exhibitions. These include a 2000 individual exhibition at the Mexican embassy in Austria and a 2001 show in Bratislava, Slovakia. Venues in Mexico in which her work has appeared include the Palacio de Bellas Artes, the Museo de Arte Carrillo Gil, the Museo Universitario del Chopo, the Museo Nacional de San Carlos, the Centro de la Imagen and the Centro Nacional de las Artes. Through the Consejo Mexicano de Fotografía her work has been shown in countries such as the United States, Canada, Cuba, Venezuela, Brazil, Italy, France and Germany.

Her archive of dance and theater photos has been used to illustrate publications of the Palacio de Bellas Artes, the National Ballet of Mexico, the Ballet Teatro del Espacio and others.

Much of her work has been published in books such as Anatomía del critica, Iconografía de Guillermina Bravo, La percepción del espectador, Dramaturgia del bailarín (all by Patrica CardonaI) along with Manual del coreógrafo by Lin Durán, Historia oral de Guillermina Bravo by César Delgado and La danza en México en el siglo XX by Alberto Dallal. Two publications are entirely dedicated to her work Danza contemporánea en México, los canto fotográfico de Christa Cowrie and the CD Rom Christa Cowrie, obra fotográfica.

Periodicals which have included her work include La Jornada, Time magazine, The New York Times, UPI, Kiosco, Le Presse, La Gaceta de Sedesol, Fotozoom, Newsweek, Wisconsin Journal, Lio, The Boston Globe, Arqueología Mexicana, History of Photography, Revista Universidad de México, Viceversa and Paso de Gato.

Her work has been recognized with membership in the Salón de la Plástica Mexicana, and in 2015, she received the Silver Camera (Cámara de Plata) Prize from Cuartoscuro magazine for her life's work.

== Artistry ==
Her initial intent in her career was photojournalism, but became attracted to photographing dance and theater as she found that is kept her focused to find the perfect shots. She has stated, “I found in dance the eternal exercise to be ready for the shot. It is a visual exercise with energy and discipline because modern dance is completely unpredictable. Many like sports because one must shoot at the right time, but it has never quite satisfied me; dance has.”
