= Justin Hollander =

American urban planning and design scholar

Justin B. Hollander is an American urban planning and design scholar. He is a professor in the Department of Urban and Environmental Policy and Planning at Tufts University. He holds a Bachelor of Arts (1996) degree from Tufts, a Masters in Regional Planning (2000) from the Department of Landscape Architecture and Regional Planning at the University of Massachusetts Amherst and a Ph.D. (2007) degree from the E.J. Bloustein School of Policy and Planning at Rutgers.

== Career ==
Hollander studies how cities and regions manage physical change during periods of growth and decline and the cognitive, health, and social dimensions of community well-being. He is an Editor-in-Chief of the Journal of Planning Education and Research and served two terms on the Governing Board of the Association of Collegiate Schools of Planning (the US national organization of urban planning academics) and was additionally appointed to the editorial boards of urban planning and architecture journals, Planning Practice & Research, the Journal of Planning Education and Research, Architectural Science Review, Archnet-IJAR: International Journal of Architectural Research, and Local Development & Society. His book Cognitive Architecture won the Environmental Design Research Association national research award. He was inducted as a Fellow of the American Institute of Certified Planners.

== Bibliography ==
Hollander has written eleven books, with many serving as textbooks in university classrooms:

- The First City on Mars: An Urban Planner’s Guide to Settling the Red Planet (2023)
- Urban experience and design: Contemporary perspectives on improving the public realm (2021) (co-editor: Ann Sussman)
- Supporting shrinkage: Better planning and decision-making for legacy cities (2021) (co-authors: Michael P. Johnson, Eliza W. Kinsey, and George R. Chichirau)
- A research agenda for shrinking cities (2018)
- An ordinary city: Planning for growth and decline in New Bedford, Massachusetts (2018)
- Urban social listening: Potential and pitfalls of using social media data in studying cities (2016) (coauthors: Erin Graves, Henry Renski, Cara Foster-Karim, Andrew Wiley, and Dibyendu Das)
- Cognitive architecture: Designing for how we respond to the built environment (2015, 2nd edition 2021) (coauthor: Ann Sussman)
- Sunburnt cities: The Great Recession, depopulation and urban planning in the American Sunbelt (2011)
- Principles of brownfields regeneration: Clean-up, design, and re-use of derelict land (2010) (coauthors: Niall Kirkwood and Julia Gold) (translated into Chinese by the Chinese Architectural and Building Press [2014] and Korean by Daega [2013]).
- Polluted, and dangerous: America’s worst abandoned properties and what can be done about them (2009)
