= Penn Institute for Urban Research =

US research center

Coordinates: 39.952185°N 75.192817°W

The Penn Institute for Urban Research (Penn IUR) is an interdisciplinary research center at the University of Pennsylvania. The Institute is affiliated with the 12 schools at the University of Pennsylvania, and housed at the University of Pennsylvania School of Design.

The Institute was founded in 2004, and focuses on three main research areas: 1) Exploring innovative urban development strategies; 2) Building the inclusive 21st century sustainable city; and 3) Understanding the role of anchor institutions in urban places.

Eugenie L. Birch and Susan M. Wachter are the Co-Directors of Penn IUR.

== Affiliated experts ==
Penn IUR has 200 affiliated urban policy experts in several categories, including Penn IUR Fellows (urban practitioners), Faculty Fellows (urban scholars at Penn) and Scholars (urban scholars outside of Penn). Among the Institute’s Faculty Fellows, Scholars and Fellows are Richard Florida, Michael Nutter, Manny Diaz (Florida politician), Frederick Steiner, John L. Jackson, Saskia Sassen, Paul Jargowsky, and Ken Lum.

== Publications ==
The Penn Institute for Urban Research publishes The City in the 21st Century Series in conjunction with the University of Pennsylvania Press. Since 2006, the Institute has published 53 titles in the series, including Equality and the City by Enrique Peñalosa Londoño Revitalizing America’s Cities and Design After Decline: How America Rebuilds Shrinking Cities. Also in the series is Beat Cop to Top Cop: A Tale of Three Cities, co-authored by Former Miami Police Chief John Timoney.

In September 2012, Penn IUR launched the Urban Research eJournal an electronic journal dedicated to disseminating the latest scholarly work on urbanism and sustainability, published through the Social Science Research Network. This eJournal gathers and distributes new research that addresses the governance, policy, economics, design and social issues related to global urbanization.

Global Urban Commons (the Commons) is a publicly-accessible directory of university-based urban research centers created by The Penn Institute for Urban Research (Penn IUR). The initiative includes more than 200 urban-research focused organizations from around the world. The creation of the Commons was funded by the Rockefeller Foundation, as part of its “Transforming Cities” initiative, which aims to address issues affecting urban areas and promote more equitable cities.

== Events ==
Penn IUR hosts panel discussions and other public events throughout the academic year, some in partnership with other organizations such as the Philadelphia Museum of Art and Federal Reserve Bank of Philadelphia.

== Affiliations ==
Penn IUR is an academic member of the New Cities Foundation. It is also a partner of the United Nations’ World Urban Campaign.
