= Susan M. Wachter =

Professor of real estate and finance

Susan M. Wachter is the Albert Sussman Professor of Real Estate, and Professor of Finance at The Wharton School of the University of Pennsylvania, the Director for the Wharton GeoSpatial Initiative and Lab, and the co-director of the Penn Institute for Urban Research. She also co-directs the Spatial Integration Laboratory for Urban Systems at the University of Pennsylvania. As an economist, she is frequently sought for comment on real estate market trends in well known media outlets—a recent interview with the International Monetary Fund summarizes her views and research.

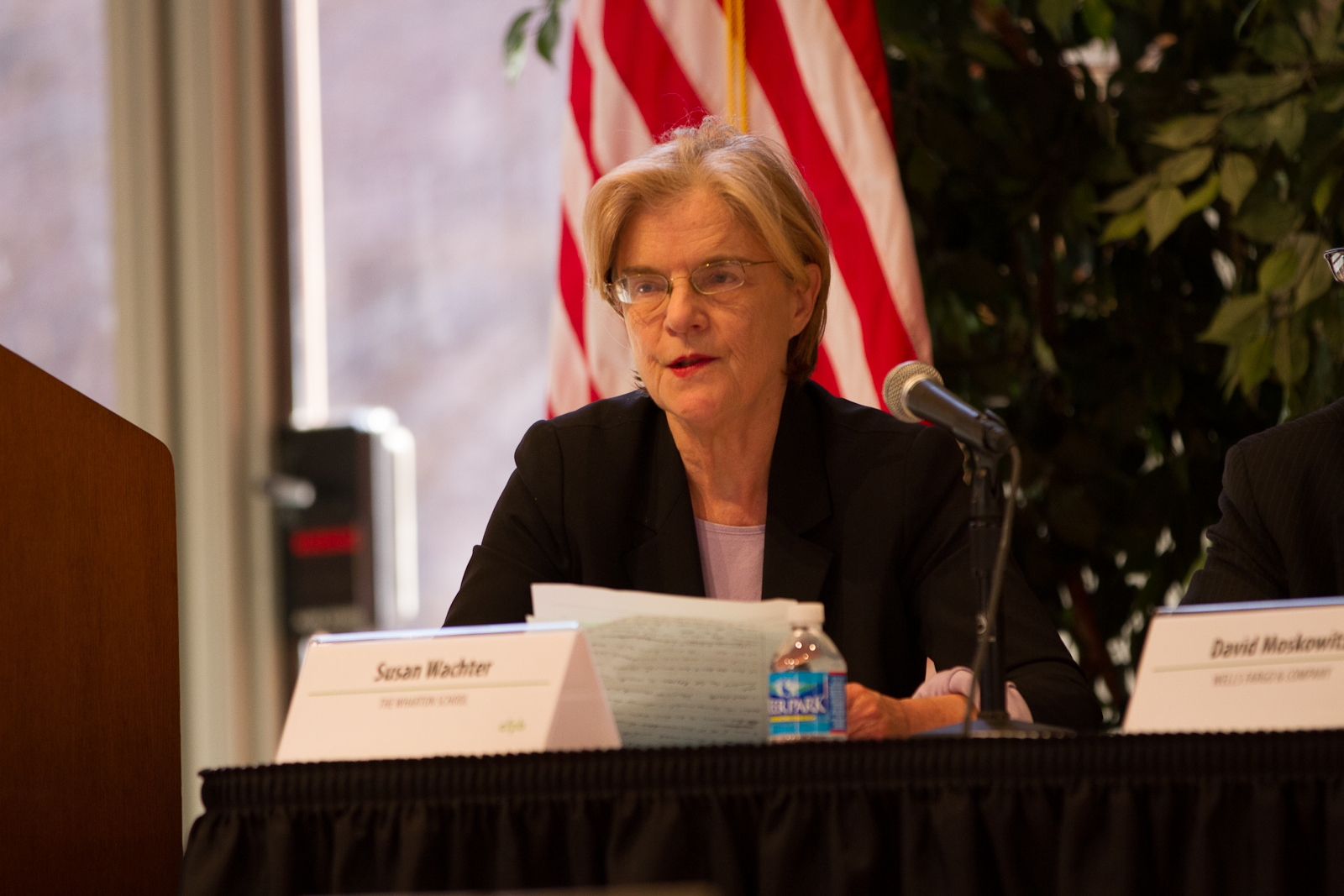

Wachter is noted for developing a model that explains why real estate is subject to booms and busts. The model is based on the inability to short sell homes and real estate more generally. Wachter's model incorporates banks' mortgage lending based on market comparables, which can be disconnected from market fundamentals. Because financial entities compete for market share by undermining lending standards procyclically, thereby creating a systemic risk externality, Wachter's additional work points to the need for what has become known as macro prudential policy and specifically the regulation of the government-sponsored enterprises as utilities.

Wachter helped to found Wharton's Real Estate Department with the goal of using economic models, including finance and urban economics, to improve the understanding of how real estate markets work. She is also known for her early work on redlining and for her work on the impact of lending constraints on homeownership.

A 2021 study found Wachter to be the second most cited author among academics who publish in real estate economics journals globally. Wachter was featured on a list of "notable women in real estate" published by Bankrate in March 2025.

== Appointments ==
Wachter was appointed the Assistant Secretary for Policy Development and Research with the United States Department of Housing and Urban Development (1998–2001). She currently serves on the Financial Research Advisory Committee for the Office of Financial Research, a sub-department of the U.S. Department of the Treasury (2016). Wachter was Celia Moh Visiting professor at Singapore Management University (2004). She serves on the Board of Editors for various publications including the Journal of Housing Economics, the Housing Policy Debate, the Journal of Real Estate and Finance, and the Journal of Real Estate Research. Wachter is the co-editor, with Eugenie L. Birch, of the Social Science Research Network Urban Research eJournal. On November 13, 2020, Wachter was appointed to the Advisory Committee of the Bureau of Economic Analysis to advise on current issues in housing and finance. Wachter participates in the National Association of Home Builders' Mortgage Roundtable.

She has been President of the American Real Estate and Urban Economics Association (1988–1989). Wachter has also served on the Global Urban Development Advisory Board, the National Research Council Review and on HUD Research (2008), the advisory board for Regulatory Research with the National Association of Homebuilders (2005–2006), the board of directors for the American Real Estate and Urban Economics Association (2003–2006), and the Blue Ribbon Committee on Housing Finance (2005–2006). From 1998 to 2001 she served on the White House Interagency Taskforce for E-Government and the White House Interagency Taskforce on Liveable Cities. From 1969 to 1972, she was a lecturer in the Department of Economics at Bryn Mawr College.

== Awards ==
Wachter is a recipient of the Anvil Award for Teaching Excellence, the Lindback Award for Distinguished Teaching at the University of Pennsylvania, the American Real Estate and Urban Economics Best International Paper Award, and the American Real Estate and Urban Economics Lifetime Achievement Award.

Wachter is the 2022 recipient of the John M. Quigley Medal for Advancing Real Estate and Urban Economics from the American Real Estate and Urban Economics Association (AREUEA).

== Selected works ==
Some of Wachter's works are listed below

=== Books ===
- Levitin, Adam J.; Wachter, Susan M. (2020). The Great American Housing Bubble: What Went Wrong and How We Can Protect Ourselves in the Future. Harvard University Press. ISBN 978-0-674-97965-9.
- Inflation and Pensions, (Homewood, IL: Richard D. Irwin, Inc., December 1987) 375 pages.
- Latin American Inflation: The Structuralist-Monetarist Debate (Lexington, MA: Lexington Books, D.C. Heath & Co., September 1976) 165 pages. ISBN 978-0-669-99622-7

==== Selected edited books ====
- Wachter, Susan M.; Zeuli, Kimberly A. (2014). Revitalizing American Cities. University of Pennsylvania Press. ISBN 978-0-8122-4555-4.
- Women Health and the World's Cities, co-editors Afaf Ibrahim Meleis and Eugénie L. Birch (Philadelphia, PA: University of Pennsylvania, 2011) 328 pages.
- The American Mortgage System: Crisis and Reform, co-editor Marvin Smith (Philadelphia, PA: University of Pennsylvania, 2011) 392 pages
- Neighborhood and Life Chances: How Place Matters in Modern America, co-editors Harriet B. Newburger and Eugénie L. Birch (Philadelphia, PA: University of Pennsylvania, 2011) 352 pages.

==== Selected book chapters ====
- “Implications of the Housing Market Bubble for Sustainable Homeownership," co-authors Paul Calem and Leonard Nakamura, The American Mortgage System: Crisis and Reform, eds. Wachter and Smith, Philadelphia: Penn Press (2011).
- “Information Failure and the U.S. Mortgage Crisis,” co-author Adam Levitin, The American Mortgage System: Crisis and Reform, eds. Wachter and Smith, Philadelphia: Penn Press (2011).
- “Using Econometrics and Geographic Information Systems for Property Valuation: A Spatial Hedonic Pricing Model,” co-authors Richard Bernknopf, Kevin Gillen and Anne Wein, Visual Valuation: Implementing Valuation Modeling and Geographic Information Solutions, eds. Mark R. Linne and Michelle Thompson, Chicago: Appraisal Institute, August 2010.
- “The Housing Finance Revolution,” co-author Richard Green, reprinted in The Blackwell Companion to the Economics of Housing: The Housing Wealth of Nations, eds. Susan Smith and Beverley Searle, London: John Wiley & Sons, 2010.
- “Urban Growth and Housing Affordability: The Conflict,” co-author Richard Voith, The Annals of the American Academy of Political and Social Science, Volume 626, November 2009, p. 112.
- “Introduction,” co-author Eugénie Birch, The Annals of the American Academy of Political and Social Science, Volume 626, November 2009, p. 112.

=== Articles ===
- Pavlov, Andrey D.; Steiner, Eva; Wachter, Susan M. (February 29, 2016). "REIT Capital Structure Choices: Preparation Matters". SSRN 2727959.
- Acolin, Arthur; Bricker, Jesse; Calem, Paul S.; Wachter, Susan M. (January 22, 2016). "Borrowing Constraints and Homeownership". SSRN 2720313.
- Levitin, Adam J.; Wachter, Susan M. (January 28, 2015). "Second-Liens and the Leverage Option". SSRN 2556687.
- Pavlov, Andrey; Wachter, Susan M.; Zevelev, Albert (March 21, 2014). "Transparency in the Mortgage Market". SSRN 2870751.
- Wachter, Susan M. (October 9, 2014). "The Housing and Credit Bubbles in the US and Europe: A Comparison". SSRN 2508033.
- Levitin, Adam J.; Wachter, Susan M. (February 14, 2013). "Why Housing?". SSRN 2114620.
- Saiz, Albert; Wachter, Susan M. (November 1, 2006). "Immigration and the Neighborhood". SSRN 931733.
- Pavlov, Andrey D.; Wachter, Susan M. (January 27, 2011). "Subprime Lending and Real Estate Prices". SSRN 1784092.
- Pavlov, Andrey D.; Wachter, Susan M. (June 23, 2006). "The Inevitability of Market-Wide Underpricing of Mortgage Default Risk". SSRN 910970.
- Pavlov, Andrey D.; Wachter, Susan M. (October 16, 2008). "Mortgage Put Options and Real Estate Markets". SSRN 1285517.
- Levitin, Adam J.; Wachter, Susan M. (April 12, 2012). "Explaining the Housing Bubble". SSRN 1669401.
