= Graduate real estate education in the United States =

Graduate real estate education is the study of real estate development at the graduate school level. It has taken many forms, giving rise to various educational models in different countries.

The decision for individuals pursuing higher education in this field often comes down to choosing between a traditional degree with a focus on real estate finance (e.g., Master in Science with a concentration in real estate) or an interdisciplinary, comprehensive degree (e.g., Master of Real Estate Development) focused wholly on real estate studies.

While there are many real estate programs available to students around the country, there are only a handful of real estate development graduate programs that tackle the broader educational task of engaging the full range of real estate development (e.g., Master of Real Estate Development) -- from property acquisition to planning and permitting, law and finance, design and construction, and culminating in marketing, commercial leasing, property, portfolio and asset management.

== History ==
Historically, graduate level coursework in real estate was limited to a major or minor in business, or training in architecture and urban planning schools. While Business school (MBA) programs might emphasize the business side of real estate, MBA students typically lack adequate understanding of real estate principles and processes. Over the last several decades, the real estate industry has matured to one with great complexity and an increasingly institutional ownership structure. The increased complexity of the industry created a demand for practitioners who possessed a comprehensive knowledge of real estate beyond that of traditional MBA generalists. One and two-year graduate level real estate degree programs originated with the founding of the New York University Real Estate Institute in (1967) (now known as the NYU Schack Institute of Real Estate) and in 1983 with the formation of the MIT Center for Real Estate. Soon after, other schools followed with Texas A&M University (1984), Columbia University (1985), the University of Southern California (1986), Johns Hopkins University (1989), and Cornell University (1996) all forming professional graduate programs focused solely on real estate education.

According to the Urban Land Institute, during the mid-1990s strong academic interest in real estate "was never greater, whether for repositioning products, redeveloping inner cities, or developing more affordable housing. Students seemed to be acting on the notion that it's a temporary downturn and graduate school is a good place for the moment." As enrollment grew, real estate programs responded by adding more course offerings to satisfy the demand.

In the early 2000s, prior to the Great Recession, the industry again acknowledged increasing need for graduates with superior qualifications — providing the research-based expertise necessary to solve complex problems in contemporary real estate development. The real estate graduate programs were in response to overwhelming support by alumni from the fields of real estate, construction and development to bring a specialized academic offering and from a many of universities provided limited number of non-MBA degree programs.

The late 2000s saw significant expansion of real estate programs to universities such as George Mason University, Auburn University, as well as additional coursework added by MBA programs that commonly did not have an emphasis on real estate. To deal with the complexity of the field and its far-reaching effects, today's industry professionals require advanced training to prepare them to operate in increasingly technical and interrelated areas.

As education needs have changed, business schools such as the University of Wisconsin, University of Pennsylvania, and University of California, Berkeley continue to cater to students interested in the flexibility of an MBA. Wharton's real estate program, for example, takes advantage of being housed in one of the top business schools in the United States and having some of the top real estate professionals in the world as advisers.

In Canada, many MBA programs, including those at the University of Toronto and University of Alberta have also began to offer increased real estate program offerings and specialization. At the Schulich School of Business at York University, what was formerly an MBA specialisation in real estate has evolved in to its own distinct program, the Master of Real Estate and Infrastructure, which houses various research institutes including the Brookfield Centre for Real Estate and Infrastructure. The academic offering in Canada reflect the trends in the United States.

In the United Kingdom, many real estate programs are folded into MBA programs or more commonly specialized masters such as the University of Reading Master of Science in Real Estate.

== Undergraduate real estate education ==
As with many MBA programs, undergraduate real estate education is commonly offered as a concentration, or focused area of study. Very few universities with varying academic reputation offer a bachelor's degree with a concentration in real estate (typically two courses during the senior year). An undergraduate degree in real estate is not a prerequisite for admission to a graduate real estate development program. Students from diverse backgrounds in geography, urban planning, business, economics, liberal arts, architecture or seeking a career change are encouraged to apply.

== Graduate real estate programs ==
There are twenty-one multi-disciplinary real estate programs which focus on the academic study of real estate primarily, the Master of Real Estate Development, while the majority of the other programs typically housed as part of a business school offer a more focused degree on finance and investment. Graduate real estate programs may award any number of degrees (e.g. Master of Real Estate Development, Master of Science in Real Estate, Master of Professional Studies in Real Estate, Master of Design Studies in Real Estate), however, the key is to review each degree curricula independent of their respective naming conventions, as there are broad differences in their content and foci that may not necessarily be reflected in the degree's name.

Two examples of graduate real estate degree naming conventions include:

=== Master in Real Estate Development (MRED or MSRED) ===
The Master of Real Estate Development degree (MRED) (or sometimes called the Master of Science in Real Estate Development (MSRED)) largely focuses on specific areas within real estate rather than taking a more generalist approach. Areas of concentration may include: real estate development, finance and investment, planning and policy, infrastructure and construction, market analysis, and real estate law. Students are generally exposed to the full range of functions and most real estate product types (e.g. residential, retail, office, hospitality, and industrial). MRED programs typically teach the subject matter through case studies and field experiences and by way of traditional class lectures. Whether in the context of urban redevelopment, historic preservation, or suburban growth, MRED students learn from both the investor's and developer's perspective, the importance of relevant issues in law, economics, finance, market analysis, negotiation, lease analysis, architecture, planning, and management. Many focus on the entire spectrum of the real estate development process-from dirt-to-deal, finance to façade-and include industry topics presented by leading local and national developers, financiers, and other players in the market. Included in this is the analysis of existing real estate assets and partnership structures.

=== Master of Science in Real Estate (MSRE) ===
The Master of Science in Real Estate degree (MSRE) often combines learning comprehensive business management skills with the understanding of how real estate markets work. Graduate programs that award a Master of Science in Real Estate degree are sometimes the expansion of real estate courses in a Business school into a degree of increased specialty or they are organically formed real estate centers within a larger college. Students who complete Master of Science in Real Estate degrees oftentimes go on to careers as real estate "project managers, asset management advisors, analysts, planners, and others." Most Master of Science in Real Estate degrees are completed in one year though two year options with the opportunity to complete a summer internship between the first and second year are available (e.g. the University of Washington) The Master of Professional Studies in Real Estate is also similarly found here, as it is simply a naming convention at Georgetown University and Cornell University.

=== Coursework ===
The course work in real estate programs varies among universities. Many programs utilize HBS-style case studies of complex real estate scenarios to heighten the student's knowledge and strategic decision-making skills. Program lengths range from 30 to 72 credit hours. Programs that have more than 33 hours will sometimes allow its students to add a concentration. A required core curriculum is typical with the core curriculum's size and makeup being largely dependent on the length and focus of the program.

Example core curriculum:

- Real Estate Development Principles
- Market Segmentation and Analysis
- Real Estate Finance and Analysis
- Real Estate Development Project Management
- Advanced Real Estate Finance
- Real Estate Site Analysis and Design
- Public Entitlement Process

In addition to the core curriculum, most two-year programs and some one-year programs offer students the opportunity to pursue a concentration, a focus on a specialized area of interest within the real estate industry. Concentrations differ between programs and universities.

Example areas of concentration:

- Development
- Finance
- Investments
- Consulting
- Sustainable Development
- Property and asset management
- Real estate marketing and market analysis
- International real estate concentrations
- Affordable housing
- Public-private partnerships
- Urban infill

Some programs, such as the MS in Real Estate Development at George Mason University, offer students the opportunity to combine elective coursework from several disciplines including business management, public policy and civil engineering.

=== Design education related to real estate development ===
The practice of real estate development requires practitioners to work with selecting building types and designs, determining appropriate dimensions, programming internal spaces, shaping the site, and appropriately fitting the project to surrounding contexts. Some programs, including Columbia University MSRED include design education in the study of real estate development. A new program established at the University at Buffalo, State University of New York, in 2015 emphasizes a capstone studio-workshop in which a multidisciplinary group of students under faculty supervision engage an actual real estate development problem for organizations acting as clients.

== Executive programs in real estate ==
Executive degree programs in real estate offer practicing professionals the opportunity to learn while they are working. These programs are distinguished from distance programs through their uniquely blended model of residency classroom experience, distance education modules, and executive field study courses. Classes meet at the beginning of every semester, usually from five to seven days, and then complete the coursework through synchronous webinars, asynchronous discussion boards, and video lectures. Executive education in real estate is taught at numerous accredited institutions such as Auburn University.

== Nationally recognized research centers ==
Real estate programs and alumni donors sponsor research by real estate faculty in numerous areas of real estate including the economics of property markets, the impacts of regulation, and the sources of equity and debt financing. Additional research, in the form of faculty-supervised student thesis work, contributes to a growing inventory of new information. The research program is essential to promoting new knowledge, advancing teaching techniques, and bridging the gap between theory and practice. Not all graduate real estate programs conduct research.

Name	University
Center for Urban Real Estate (CURE)	Columbia University
Guthrie Center for Real Estate Research	Northwestern University
Real Estate Academic Initiative	Harvard University
MIT Center for Real Estate	MIT
Fisher Center for Real Estate & Urban Economics	University of California, Berkeley
The Center for Real Estate and Finance (CREF)	Cornell University
Center for Real Estate Entrepreneurship	George Mason University
The Richard H. Pennell Center for Real Estate	Clemson University
NYU Schack Center for Sustainable Built Environment, NYU Schack REIT Center NYU Stern Center for Real Estate Finance Research	New York University
The Graaskamp Center for Real Estate	University of Wisconsin-Madison
Lusk Center for Real Estate	University of Southern California
Burnham-Moores Center for Real Estate	University of San Diego
Colvin Institute of Real Estate Development	University of Maryland
Runstad Center for Real Estate Studies	University of Washington
The Center for Real Estate Education and Research	Florida State University
Terry W. Stiles School of Real Estate Development	Nova Southeastern University
Bergstrom Center for Real Estate Studies	University of Florida

== Related graduate program offerings ==
Professionals in real estate often hold degrees in related fields such as city planning, construction management, accounting, property management, architecture or law. One of the most common programs continues to be a Master of City Planning, regional planning, or urban planning degree with a real estate emphasis. Planning programs tend to emphasize land use planning, transportation or infrastructure development, land use law and policy and other planning topics; students who take a concentration in real estate development will learn how it relates to planning.

== Career opportunities ==
A sample of careers include: large public real estate companies, small private entrepreneurial organizations, regional investors, companies that specialize in a single product (e.g. office/retail/multi-family), non-profits involved in areas such as affordable housing, corporations that own real estate, companies that finance real estate. and companies that provide services such as design and architecture firms, brokerage companies, investment banks, REITs, and various consultancies. Careers in the public sector at the city, county, state, federal or military level offer interesting and rewarding career opportunities related to real estate. The skill sets are also transferable to other industries and sectors of the economy.

== See also ==
- Real estate development
- Real estate
- Master of Urban Planning
- MBA
