= War on Terror (film) =

- Directed by: Sebastian J. F.
- Written by: Fate
- Produced by: Sebastian J. F.
- Starring: Manfred Nowak; Amy Goodman; Alfred W. McCoy; Murat Kurnaz; Mustafa Ait Idir
- Distributed by: Parallel Universe
- Release date: December 9, 2011
- Running time: 89 min.
- Country: Austria
- Language: English

War on Terror is an Austrian documentary film about the "war on terror" initiated by U.S. president George W. Bush in 2001. The film features interviews with Manfred Nowak, who was United Nations Special Rapporteur on Torture from 2004 to 2010, Amy Goodman, the host and co-founder of Democracy Now! and the U.S. historian Alfred W. McCoy. Two former detainees from the Guantanamo Bay detention camp are introduced in the film, Murat Kurnaz and Mustafa Ait Idir.

It was theatrically released in Austria on December 9, 2011.

War on Terror is the third film from Parallel Universe.

== See also ==
- War on terror
- United Nations Special Rapporteur
- Democracy Now!
