= John R.W. Smail =

American historian

John Richard Wharton Smail (born in Cairo in 1930 – died October 20, 2002) was a University of Wisconsin professor of history, best-known for arguing for an autonomous history of Southeast Asia, i.e. "viewing Southeast Asia in its own terms."

He was born in Egypt under British protectorate, the family moved to the United States when Smail was nine years old. He took a B.A. (1951) and M.A. (1952) from Harvard, both in English history. During the Korea War, he served in Japan. At that time, he traveled throughout Southeast Asia and India, which roused his interest in Southeast Asian history. Upon his return to the US in 1956, he enrolled in Cornell University's Southeast Asian studies program, where he completed his Ph.D. in 1964.

In 1962, he started teaching at the Department of History of the University of Wisconsin–Madison. There he initiated the Southeast Asian History program, the university's Center for Southeast Asian Studies and, together with Philip D. Curtin, the Comparative Tropical History (now World History) program. After being diagnosed with Alzheimer's disease, Smail retired in 1988. In 1993, a festschrift was published in his honor

== Books ==
- Smail, John R. W. Bandung in the Early Revolution 1945-1946: A Study in the Social History of the Indonesian Revolution. Jakarta: Equinox Publishing, 2009. ISBN 9786028397339.
  - Translated into Indonesian by George M. T. Kahin, and Muhammad Y. Aravena. as Bandung Awal Revolusi 1945-1946, 2011.
- Steinberg, David J. In Search of Southeast Asia: A Modern History. David Joel Steinberg, David K. Wyatt, John R.w. Smail, Alexander Woodside ... [etc.] Edited by David Joel Steinberg. London: Pall Mall Press, 1971
  - Revised ed. 1987 ISBN 9780824845421
