= Lázaro Blanco =

Mexican photographer (1938–2011)

Lázaro Blanco Fuentes (April 1, 1938 – May 4, 2011) was a Mexican photographer.

Blanco was born in Ciudad Juárez, Chihuahua, Mexico. He directed the Casa del Lago Photography Workshop in Mexico City from 1968 until his death.

Blanco's work has been shown in numerous galleries.
