= Planning Accreditation Board =

Urban planning education organization

- Official logo of the PAB
- Abbreviation: PAB
- Predecessor: American Institute of Planners (1960-1984)
- Formation: 1984; 42 years ago
- Type: Educational accreditation
- Headquarters: Chicago, Illinois, United States
- Location: 2334 W. Lawrence Avenue, Suite 209
- Official language: English
- Chair: Connie P. Ozawa
- Affiliations: American Planning Association; American Institute of Certified Planners; Association of Collegiate Schools of Planning
- Website: planningaccreditationboard.org

The Planning Accreditation Board (PAB) is a non-profit educational accreditation organization based in Chicago, Illinois, United States. The PAB's mission is to promote excellence among planning programs and ensure high-quality education for future urban planners.

== History ==
PAB was founded in 1984, when it was deemed necessary to assess the quality of urban planning education and encourage excellence in higher education. Prior to this formal accreditation process, there was a recognition program in place administered by the National Education Development Committee (NEDC) of the American Institute of Planners (AIP).

The PAB reviews undergraduate and graduate urban planning degree programs in the United States and Canada. Programs must meet their standards and criteria in order to receive accreditation. They are recognized by the Council on Higher Education Accreditation and are a member of the Association of Professional and Specialized Accreditors.

== Notable members ==
- Eugenie L. Birch
- Margarita McCoy

== See also ==
- List of recognized higher education accreditation organizations
