= Crime, Law and Social Change =

- Discipline: Criminology, sociology
- Language: English
- Edited by: Mary Dodge; Willem Huisman

Publication details
- Former name(s): Contemporary Crises
- History: 1977–present
- Publisher: Springer Science+Business Media
- Frequency: Monthly
- Impact factor: 0.662 (2017)

Standard abbreviations
- ISO 4: Crime Law Soc. Change

Indexing
- CODEN: CSCJEL
- ISSN: 0925-4994 (print); 1573-0751 (web)
- LCCN: 91657049
- OCLC no.: 848842344

Links
- Journal homepage; Online archive

Crime, Law and Social Change is a monthly peer-reviewed academic journal covering criminology from a global perspective, with a particular focus on "financial crime, corruption, terrorism and organizational crime". It was established in 1977 as Contemporary Crises, obtaining its current name in 1991. The editors-in-chief are Mary Dodge (University of Colorado Denver) and Willem Huisman (Vrije Universiteit Amsterdam). According to the Journal Citation Reports, the journal has a 2017 impact factor of 0.662.
