= Urban planning education =

Overview of urban planning education

Urban planning education is a practice of teaching and learning urban theory, studies, and professional practices. The interaction between public officials, professional planners and the public involves a continuous education on planning process. Community members often serve on a city planning commission, council or board. As a result, education outreach is effectively an ongoing cycle. Formal education is offered as an academic degree in urban, city, rural, and/or regional planning, and more often awarded as a master's degree specifically accredited by an urban planning association in addition to the university's university-wide primary accreditation, although some universities offer bachelor's degrees and doctoral degrees also accredited in the same fashion. Although most (but not all) bachelor's degrees in urban planning do not have the secondary-layer of urban planning association accreditation required for most positions, relying solely on the university's primary accreditation as a legitimate institution of higher education. At some universities, urban studies, also known as pre-urban planning, is the paraprofessional version of urban and regional planning education, mostly taken as a bachelor's degree prior to taking up post-graduate education in urban planning or as a master's or graduate certificate program for public administration professionals to get an understanding of public policy implications created by urban planning decisions or techniques.

Since planning programs are usually small, they tend not to be housed in distinct "planning schools" but rather, as part of an architecture school, a design school, a geography department, or a public policy school since these are cognate fields. Generally speaking, planning programs in architecture schools focus primarily on physical planning and design, while those in policy schools tend to focus on policy and administration. For instance, in Finland there is no separate degree program for "urban planning", but rather is considered as a specialty within the Finnish schools of architecture, and which students opt for towards the end of their studies and when choosing a diploma thesis, but officially graduating with a degree in architecture; And even post-graduate studies and doctoral theses in urban and regional planning are within the purview of architecture education.

== Coursework ==
As urban planning is such a broad and interdisciplinary field, a typical planning degree program emphasizes breadth over depth, with core coursework that provides background for all areas of planning. Core courses typically include coursework in history, theory of urban planning, urban design, statistics, land use, planning law, zoning law, public policy and administration, urban economics, and planning practice. Many planning degree programs also allow a student to "concentrate" in a specific area of interest within planning, such as land use, environmental planning, housing, community development, economic development, historic preservation, international development, urban design, transportation planning, or geographic information systems (GIS). Some programs permit a student to concentrate in real estate, however, graduate real estate education has changed giving rise to specialized real estate programs.

== Professional degrees ==
The most common planning degree is at the graduate level (per Planetizen's global program directory); there is not one standard naming convention for the degree and each generally reflects the geographic focus of the specific program (e.g. regional, urban, city, and/or town planning). There are fewer bachelor's degree programs in urban planning. Research degrees are commonly only offered as part of a doctorate program. The United States has the highest concentration of programs in planning, followed by the United Kingdom, Australia, and Canada. However, there are also a growing number of offerings in countries including South Africa, Brazil, and India.

=== Bachelor's degree ===
An undergraduate academic degree is designed to train applicants in various aspects of designing, engineering, managing and resolving challenges related to urban human settlements. It is awarded for a course of study that lasts up to four years and contextual to modern challenges of urbanisation. It goes into the techniques and theories related to settlement design starting at the site planning level of a neighbourhood and moving up to the regional city planning context. Understanding relations between built forms and the citizens in cities and rural areas, and their implications on local environment, supporting utilities, transport networks, and physical infrastructure forms the core of the planning course. With an engineering orientation, the graduates emerging as urban planners are equipped with not only tools for rational comprehensive planning but also participatory and social development.

The degree may be awarded as a Bachelor of Arts in Geography with an emphasis in urban planning, Bachelor of Arts in Urban Planning, or Bachelor of Science in Urban and Regional Planning, among others. The distinction reflects university policies, or some universities may have greater course offerings in urban planning, design, sociology, or a related degree.

=== Master's degree ===
The Master of Urban Planning (MUP) is a two-year academic/professional master's degree that qualifies graduates to work as urban planners. Some schools offer the degree as a Master of City Planning (MCP), Master of Community Planning, Master of Regional Planning (MRP), Master of Town Planning (MTP), Master of Planning (MPlan), Master of Environmental Planning (MEP) or in some combination of the aforementioned (e.g., Master of Urban and Regional Planning), depending on the program's specific focus. Some schools offer a Master of Arts or Master of Science in Planning. Regardless of the name, the degree remains generally the same.

A thesis, final project or capstone project is usually required to graduate. Additionally, an internship component is almost always mandatory due to the high value placed on work experience by prospective employers in the field.

Like most professional master's degree programs, the MUP is a terminal degree. However, some graduates choose to continue on to doctoral studies in urban planning or cognate fields. The Ph.D. is a research degree, as opposed to the professional MUP, and thus focuses on training planners to engage in scholarly activity directed towards providing greater insight into the discipline and underlying issues related to urban development.

== Accreditation ==
=== Canada ===
The primary body for accrediting educational institutions that offer urban planning programs in Canada is the Professional Standards Board for the Planning Profession in Canada (PSB). Established in 2012, the PSB is responsible for certification of urban planners across Canada and "administering accreditation reviews of university planning degree programs based on the accreditation program principles, policies and administrative arrangements". The PSB accredits programs that offer undergraduate and masters level degrees.

Canadian institutions may apply to the PSB for accreditation for a period of five years, following a successful initial accreditation. Programs are evaluated annually to ensure compliance with accreditation standards. For new programs, or after the five-year period has elapsed, an intensive review takes place that ensures programs meet criteria for accreditation.

Graduation from a PSB accredited program allows a graduate to apply for certification as a planner, and for candidate membership in their Provincial or Territorial Association. Following a two-year period of supervised work experience, candidates then write their professional exams. Upon successful completion of the exams, work experience, and a mentorship program, candidates are granted full certification as Register Professional Planner by their Provincial or Territorial Association and the Canadian Institute of Planners.

The PSB also recognizes degrees conferred by institutions accredited by the American Planning Accreditation Board in the United States, and the Planning Institute of Australia as eligible for the certification process.

=== India ===
Though planning is not a recognized profession under Indian law, the profession was started long back with School of Planning and Architecture in 1941 as a Department of Architecture of Delhi College of Engineering now the Delhi Technological University. It was later integrated with the School of Town and Country Planning which was established in 1955 by the Government of India to provide facilities for rural, urban and regional planning. On integration, the School was renamed as school of planning and architecture in 1959. Today it is one of the premier schools of pursuing planning studies at bachelor, masters and post doctorate levels. The Institute of Town Planners, India (ITPI) set up on the lines of the Royal Town Planning Institute, London is the body representing planning professionals in India. A small group formed itself into an Indian Board of Town Planners which after three years of continuous work formed the Institute of Town Planners, India. The Institute which was established in July 1951, today, has a membership of over 2,800, apart from a sizable number of student members, many of whom have qualified Associateship Examination (AITP) conducted by ITPI. Institutes under ITPI offer a 4-year undergraduate degree in planning.

=== United Kingdom ===
Planning is a complex issue in UK law, therefore there are several regulatory bodies that exist. The bulk of degrees are accredited by the Royal Town Planning Institute, often abbreviated to RTPI. Degrees accredited by this professional body are generally four years and are therefore master's degrees – the majority of these degrees are prefixed MPlan.

Some degrees, such as the University of Sheffield Planning School's "MPlan Urban Studies and Planning" are accredited by both the RTPI and RICS – the Royal Institute for Chartered Surveyors.

=== United States ===
The Planning Accreditation Board is the sole accreditor of planning programs in the United States. The Planning Accreditation Board (PAB) accredits graduate and undergraduate planning programs in the United States and Canada.

As of 1 January 2023, PAB accredits 16 undergraduate programs and 78 graduate programs at 82 North America Universities. Graduation from a PAB accredited program allows a graduate to sit for the American Institute of Certified Planners (AICP) Certification Exam earlier in their career than a student with a degree from a non-accredited program or school.

Programs that desire accreditation through the PAB must apply for candidacy status. The program seeking candidacy must demonstrate that they meet five preconditions to accreditation. Once the preconditions have successfully been met by the program, the program must complete and submit a Self-Study Report. Through the Self-Study Report, the program assesses their performance and compliance with PAB's accreditation standards. This report serves as the basis of review for the Planning Accreditation Board, along with a formal meeting with the Program Administrator at the Board meeting.

If candidacy is awarded, the Planning Accreditation Board will send a three-member team to visit and formally review the program during a semester. The three member team will meet with faculty, staff, students, and members of the local planning community. The team will then submit a Site Visit Report to the Planning Accreditation Board. During the meeting of the Planning Accreditation Board, the board will review the Self-Study Report, Site Visit Report and other documentation and meet with the Program Administrator. At the conclusion of the meeting, the Board decides if the program is awarded accreditation and the length of accreditation.

Accreditation length is dependent on the extent the program complies with requirements of the Planning Accreditation Board, with the maximum length awarded is 7 years. Programs must re-apply for accreditation in the year their accreditation term expires.

== Rankings ==
United States

While there is no official ranking of the graduate programs for planning, planning-community site Planetizen publishes a periodical guide titled "Planetizen Guide to Graduate Urban Planning Programs." The guide is compiled of data collection from participating planning schools, educators, and past buyers across the nation. Moreover, the guide includes the overall top 25 graduate programs, top 25 programs according to educators, rankings by geography, other additional rankings, and in-depth directory on each of the participating planning programs.

Planetizen Top 10 Graduate Urban Planning Programs Ranked, 7th edition (2023).

University	2023 Rank	2019 Rank
University of California, Los Angeles	1	4
Massachusetts Institute of Technology	2	1
Rutgers, The State University of New Jersey	3	3
University of California, Berkeley	4	2
University of North Carolina at Chapel Hill	5	5
Georgia Institute of Technology	6	10
Harvard University	7	6
University of Southern California	8	8
University of Texas at Austin	9	11
Tufts University	10	16

== Youth education ==
Involving youth in urban planning requires an educational model and curriculum. Historically, youth have not been given much political power in the usual top-down urban planning. In the past centuries there have been very minimal efforts to include youth in urban planning decision processes. In recent years, however, there has been an increasing effort to expose youth to urban planning as a profession. In doing so, youth are able to be involved and lead planning processes. Most efforts have emphasized the importance of including youth from marginalized neighborhoods.

=== 1960s and 1970s ===
One of the first attempts to involve children in urban planning in the United States was through an initiative, “Growing Up in Cities” created by urban designer Kevin Lynch via the United Nations. This program's mission was to expose urban planning to children and teenagers and give them the tools to evaluate the strengths and weaknesses of their own neighborhoods. This program was not successful because it lacked city government support. However, it paved the way for another initiative, “Child Friendly Cities Initiative” in 1989. This program shared a similar agenda in letting children conceptualize an ideal city that meets their needs.

Jane Jacobs, a prominent urban activist and author of The Death and Life of Great American Cities was one of the first to analyze the needs of children in the built environment. When thinking about participatory planning, there is debate on whether children and teenagers should participate in city planning decisions. Jacobs argues that sidewalks should not ignore the needs of children to play and be safe at the same time.

=== Since 2010 ===
Since 2010, there have been many non-profit efforts to expose students to urban planning as a profession and field of study. For example, The Center for Understanding the Built Environment, otherwise known as, CUBE, brings together teachers and urban planners to create an accessible urban planning curriculum for children. The non-profit's innovative educational model promotes many learning results for students, including responsible action.

Urban planning professors at the University of California, Berkeley also created an influential academic model named Y-PLAN, or, Youth–Plan, Learn, Act Now. This model engages UC Berkeley urban studies students with high school students from Richmond, California in efforts to transform their neighborhood and expose students to the urban planning process.

== See also ==
- Graduate real estate education
- Indigenous planning
- MBA
