= Manuel Buendía =

Mexican journalist

- Born: Manuel Buendía Tellezgirón; 24 May 1926; Zitácuaro, Michoacán, Mexico
- Died: 30 May 1984 (aged 58); Mexico City, Mexico
- Cause of death: Gunshot wounds
- Education: Escuela Libre de Derecho
- Occupations: Journalist; Political columnist
- Employer: Excélsior
- Spouse: Dolores Abalos Lebrija
- Awards: National Journalism Award (Mexico, 1977)

Manuel Buendía Tellezgirón (24 May 1926 – 30 May 1984) was a Mexican journalist and political columnist who last worked for the daily Excélsior, one of the most-read newspapers in Mexico City. His direct reporting style in his column Red Privada ("Private Network"), which publicly exposed government and law enforcement corruption, organized crime, and drug trafficking, was distributed and read in over 200 newspapers across Mexico.

Born in the state of Michoacán, Buendía first wrote for La Nación, the official magazine of the National Action Party (PAN). After losing interest in the party, he left to work for La Prensa and became the editor-in-chief in 1960. He left the newspaper in 1963 and worked for several different media outlets in Mexico throughout the 1970s and '80s, including the Mexico City-based newspapers El Universal and Excélsior.

Buendía was recognized largely for his investigative reporting, and particularly for his coverage of the CIA's covert operations in Mexico, the rise of ultra-rightwing groups, fraudulent businessmen, corruption in Mexico's state-owned petroleum company Pemex, and the role of organized crime in Mexico's political system. He was also famous for breaking news on controversial political subjects thanks to his access to top Mexican officials. His investigative reporting, however, angered many and made him a frequent target of death threats, which he took very seriously.

On the afternoon of 30 May 1984, Buendía left his office in Mexico City and was walking to his car when a man shot him from behind several times, killing him on the scene. For over five years, the murder case remained unsolved and with several irregularities, including the loss of evidence. In 1989, several members of the extinct Federal Security Directorate (DFS), Mexico's top police force, were arrested for their involvement in the murder of Buendía. The murder case was closed after the perpetrators were arrested, but several journalists doubt the probe's results and believe that the masterminds behind Buendía's murder were never arrested.

== Early life ==
Drawing of Mexican journalist Manuel Buendía sitting at his typewriter.

Manuel Buendía Tellezgirón was born in Zitácuaro, Michoacán, Mexico on 24 March 1926. He was the third child of José Buendía Gálvez (father) and Josefina Tellezgirón Tinoco (mother), both from the State of Mexico. Buendía attended a religious elementary school located in front of Teatro Juárez de Zitácuaro, a former theatre in his hometown. At the age of 12, his parents moved to Morelia, Michoacán and enrolled him at Seminario Menor, where he studied for three years. As a teenager, Buendía contributed to La Nación, a magazine of the National Action Party (PAN).

Though he sympathized with the PAN during his early life, Buendía later lost interest in the party. His mother died of natural causes on 21 June 1941, and Buendía returned to Zitácuaro. After a few years, he was awarded a scholarship at Instituto Patria, a Jesuit high school in Mexico City. Upon graduation he attended the Escuela Libre de Derecho, a private Law school in Mexico City, but dropped out to take care of his family following the death of his father in 1945.

== Journalism career ==
From 1949 to 1953, Buendía worked for La Nación and met the magazine's secretary Dolores Abalos Lebrija, whom he married on 19 January 1955. Though he first wrote for La Nación, his professional journalistic career began at the newspaper La Prensa in 1953. He worked as an editor, crime reporter, and political columnist for the newspaper until he became the editor-in-chief in January 1960. Around that time Buendía started his daily column Red Privada ("Private Network"), where he wrote about the alleged collusion of organized crime in Mexico's political system. In 1963, he left to work at the newspaper El Día and wrote at the political column Para Control de Usted ("For You to Control") under the penname "J.M. Tellezgirón". From 1964 to 1965, Buendía directed the weekly Crucero and wrote the column Concierto Político ("Political Concert") under the penname "D. I. Ogenes".

On 1 January 1971, he was appointed as the head of the Press and Public Relations of Mexico City alongside Alfonso Martínez Domínguez. However, Buendía turned down the position in June following the massacre of student demonstrators. A year later, Buendía worked as an advisor to Guillermo Martínez Domínguez, the former head of Nacional Financiera, a bank of Mexico's Secretariat of Finance and Public Credit (SHCP). In Nacional Financiera, Buendía befriended Gerardo Bueno Zirón, who shortly after being appointed as director of the National Council of Science and Technology (CONACYT) offered him a position as director of the institution's Press and Public Relations department in 1973. That year, Henrique González Casanova, the former head of the Political Science department at the National Autonomous University of Mexico (UNAM), invited Buendía to work as a part-time professor, a job that the journalist held until his death in 1984.

In December 1976 Buendía left his post in CONACYT to become a full-time columnist. He then worked at El Sol de México, a newspaper owned by Organizacion Editorial Mexicana. After facing some differences with the owners of the print media company, Buendía left on 17 August 1978 to work at El Universal, a newspaper based in Mexico City. Only lasting until December of that year, he left to work at Excélsior, a daily newspaper with one of the largest circulations in Mexico City. At this newspaper, Buendía wrote for the column Red Privada, which was distributed and read in over 200 newspaper across Mexico. In his column he wrote about the covert operations of the CIA in Mexico during the Cold War, ultra-rightwing groups, crooked businessmen, and corrupt government officials involved in drug trafficking.

His investigations angered many in Mexico's political elite and made him a frequent target of death threats. Buendía took the death threats he received very seriously and thereby carried a pistol, either on his belt or in a leather pocket. Prior to his death, Buendía wrote extensively on the alleged corruption within Mexico's Petroleum Workers Union; the allegations of wrongdoings of Jorge Díaz Serrano, former leader of Pemex, the national oil company; and Arturo Durazo Moreno, the former head of Mexico City's police force. Buendía also criticized the role of the U.S. government and the CIA in Mexico, and often published names of American officials involved in secret operations. Although he was quick to publish controversial reports, Buendía's direct reporting was respected and generally considered reliable given his access to top Mexican officials. He was the most-read journalist in Mexico's print media, and is often cited by newspapers and journalists as the most influential political columnist in Mexico of the second half of the 20th century.

== Assassination ==
On Wednesday, 30 May 1984, Buendía left his offices in Colonia Juárez at around 6:30 p.m. and headed towards his car in a parking lot near Insurgentes Avenue at the Zona Rosa neighborhood in Mexico City. As he got closer to his car, a tall man wearing jeans, a black jacket, and a baseball cap approached him from behind and violently grabbed his coat before shooting him four times with a .38 Super. Buendía was carrying a handgun on his waist but he was not able to defend himself at the moment of his death. After killing him, the assailant fled on a motorcycle with another man.

There were several bystanders who witnessed the murder and managed to see the faces of the assassins, including Juan Manuel Bautista, a colleague of Buendía; Rogelio Barrera Galindo, a man who had parked his vehicle close to the journalist's; and Felipe Flores Fernández, a bus driver. Among the first to arrive at the murder scene was José Antonio Zorrilla Pérez, then-head of the Federal Security Directorate (DFS), Mexico's equivalent of the FBI, and one of Buendía's main sources for his political publications. Photos of Buendía's corpse circulated across Mexico and the rest of the world.

Suspicions first fell on Los Tecos ("The Owls"), an ultra-rightwing group of the Autonomous University of Guadalajara who were largely criticized by Buendía for terrorizing their campus. However, suspicions turned to drug traffickers and high-level government officials, specifically those of the DFS. According to local media reports, once Buendía was killed, DFS agents went into the columnist's office and stole several files.

=== Investigation ===
The murder of Buendía, alongside the killing of other journalists in Mexico that year, sent a chilling message to newspapers across the country. "The bullets that killed Manuel Buendia ... were not directed at one man but at freedom of expression," read Excelsior's front page on the day after the killing. The killing was immediately condemned by the administration of President Miguel de la Madrid, who promised to bring the perpetrators to justice through a thorough investigation. However, the investigation dragged for over five years with no arrests and several inconsistencies, including the loss of evidence.

On 11 June 1989, Zorrilla Pérez himself was charged with planning the murder; Juan Rafael Moro Ávila, also a DFS agent and great-grandnephew of former President Manuel Ávila Camacho, was charged of being a co-perpetrator with José Luis Ochoa Alonso (alias El Chocorrol), who shot Buendía at point-blank. (Note: José Luis Ochoa Alonso (alias El Chocorrol) was killed by 1985.) Another hypothesis was that Moro was only responsible for driving the motorcycle used by the real assassin, Juan Arévalo Gardoqui, then Secretariat of National Defense, to escape. (Note: This information was never officially confirmed. Juan Arévalo Gardoqui was found dead three days later in the state of Zacatecas after being stabbed 120 times.) Three other DFS agents were also arrested: Juventino Prado Hurtado, Raúl Pérez Carmona and Sofía Naya. At least two main suspects, José Luis Ochoa Alonso and Juan Arévalo Gardoqui, were reported murdered in unclear circumstances before being formally charged.

The perpetrators were apprehended in 1989 under the administration of President Carlos Salinas de Gortari. Moro and Zorrilla were sentenced to 25 and 35 years in prison respectively, but were released from prison in February 2009 for good conduct after serving at least half of their sentences. Several public intellectuals, journalists, press freedom organizations, newspapers, and politicians protested their releases. Zorrilla returned to prison later that year after he failed to provide a formal letter petitioning his release. On 10 September 2013, Zorrilla was released from prison after a Mexico City judge granted him the opportunity to fulfill the remaining years of his sentence at his residence due to unstable health conditions. The Mexican government closed the case after the arrests, but many journalists doubted the results of the investigation and believed that the masterminds behind the murder case remained at large.

== Published books ==
- La Santa Muerta ("Saint Death", 1967)
- La CIA en México ("The CIA in Mexico", 1984)
- La Ultraderecha en México ("The Far-Right in Mexico", 1984)
- Ejercicio Periodístico ("Journalistic Exercise", 1985)
- Los Petroleros ("The Oil Dealers", 1985)
- El Humor ("The Humor", 1986)
- Los Empresarios ("The Businessmen", 1986)
- Pensamiento y acción de la derecha poblana ("Thinking and action of the right in Puebla", 1987)
- El Oficio de Informar ("The Job of Informing", 1988)

== See also ==
- Mexican drug war
- List of journalists killed in Mexico

== Sources ==
=== Bibliography ===
- Bartley, Russell; Bartley, Sylvia (2015). Eclipse of the Assassins. University of Wisconsin Press.
- Coerver, Don M. (2004). Mexico: An Encyclopedia of Contemporary Culture and History. ABC-CLIO. ISBN 1576071324.
- Cole, Robert R. (1996). Communication in Latin America: Journalism, Mass Media, and Society. Rowman & Littlefield. ISBN 0842025596.
- Collings, Anthony (2001). Words of Fire: Independent Journalists who Challenge Dictators, Druglords, and Other Enemies of a Free Press. New York University Press. ISBN 0814716059.
- Lutz, Ellen (1990). Human Rights in Mexico: A Policy of Impunity. Human Rights Watch. p. 74. ISBN 0929692624. "manuel buendia columnist."
- Moncada, Carlos (1991). Del México Violento: Periodistas Asesinados (in Spanish). Edamex. ISBN 9684095767.
- Ocampo, Aurora Maura (1988). Diccionario de escritores mexicanos, siglo XX (in Spanish). Mexico City: UNAM. ISBN 9683606431.
- UAL (2006). "Semblanzas del pensamiento periodístico en México" (PDF) (in Spanish). Universidad América Latina. Archived (PDF) from the original on 15 September 2013.
