= Seymour J. Mandelbaum =

Seymour Jacob Mandelbaum (January 13, 1936 – January 23, 2013) was an American professor of urban history and planning at the University of Pennsylvania.

== Biography ==
Mandelbaum was born in Chicago on January 13, 1936. He received his B.A. from Columbia University in 1956 and Ph.D. from Princeton University in 1962. His Ph.D. dissertation on 1870s New York City history led to his publication of Boss Tweed's New York (1965).

Mandelbaum taught at the Carnegie Institute of Technology, Annenberg School for Communication, and joined the University of Pennsylvania School of Design in 1967 and was made emeritus professor in 2004. His research interests included planning theory and planning ethics as well as the political, social, and moral implications of planning policies.

Mandelbaum received a Guggenheim Fellowship in 1965. He died on January 23, 2013, at age 77.
