= Piels Beer =

American beer brand

Piels Beer, also called Piel Bros. Beer and Piel's Beer, is a regional lager beer, originally brewed in the East New York section of Brooklyn, New York City, at 315 Liberty Avenue.

== History ==
=== Origins ===
Piels was founded in 1883 by the Piel brothers: Gottfried, Michael and Wilhelm Piel. Michael (born in Stoffeln, Düsseldorf am Rhein, Germany, March 29, 1849; died at Lake Parlin, Maine, June 12, 1915) was the brewer. He was the son of Heinrich Hubert and Gertrud (Gispé) Piel, and descended from an old Rhenish stock of farmers. To the original and extensive Stoffeln Farm, his father and uncles had added large tillages in Mörsenbroich-Düsseldorf.

Michael saw military service in the Franco-Prussian War of 1870-71. The impressions on the country boy of his years of service at Berlin, which had already begun to modernize its industries, lingered and served constantly to stimulate his natural gifts of invention. For several years after the war, Michael worked at Mörsenbroich with his elder brother.

Gradually, Michael moved away from the family calling of farming. In the breeding of roses, and in the development of a new and highly productive breed of bees, for both of which, after but two years of experimentation, he was voted the government's highest awards, he found the encouragement he needed for the growing determination to carve out his own future. It was, however, his invention of a centrifuge for the extraction of honey, awarded special governmental recognition and immediately adopted into general use, that decided him. As the protégé of a machine manufacturer, he visited the industrial centers of the progressive Rhineland and soon chose the ancient German industry of brewing as the one offering the best opportunity for his talent of applying machinery to natural processes.

The new science of modern refrigeration had just come into practice, and Michael was fascinated by the possibilities for applying it to brewing. He began his apprenticeship as a brewer in the old-style subterranean cellars at the breweries of Dortmund, Westphalia. In 1883, when his apprenticeship ended, he joined his younger brother, Gottfried, then already established as an export merchant in New York City. Together they founded a brewery in East New York with a typical German feel, but using modern scientific principles.

=== Early years ===
The brothers, as a partnership, secured the title to a small old-style brewing plant, then in disuse, and set to work converting it to newer ideas. The soft water from Long Island was preferred by German brewers, and breweries in Brooklyn proliferated at this time. Michael was the brewer, superintendent, and engineer, and found that his hours were from four o'clock in the morning to ten at night. By 1888, the ability of Gottfried as the financial head of the firm, and the excellence of Michael's products helped them prosper and the partnership became a corporation in 1898, and they gained a national reputation.

The demand for the products of the plant — a typical German beer was then a novelty in the American brewing industry — necessitated enlarged facilities. A new era began: the acquired plant was demolished and a new plant was erected. Subterranean cellars made way for a building of cellars above surface, under modern refrigeration. The plant represented a new achievement in brewing construction. Michael easily adopted new principles and contributed many ideas of his own. Continued success justified this enlargement of facilities, and twice more during his lifetime the plant was expanded in size and facilities.

The brewery's reputation spread abroad, and for years brewing academicians, experts, and scientists from Europe and South America visited to study Michael's work. Many of his ideas were copied abroad. The plant enjoyed the distinction, as the result of Michael's constant scientific advances in his field, of the continued exchange with European authorities of German brewing ideas, a unique achievement for an American manufacturer. Piels union employees are reputed to have been guaranteed ice cold beer on tap 24 hours a day in their union contract.

Michael retired from active management as the technical head of the corporation in 1900, devoting his last years to the acquisition of German paintings of hunting scenes.

=== Advertising ===
Harry (left) and Bert Piel

In the 1950s, Piels had a very successful television advertising campaign when the Young & Rubicam ad agency created Bert and Harry Piel, the fictitious animated owners and pitchmen for the brewery. United Productions of America animated the spots, while the character voices were provided by the comedians Bob and Ray. Harry (Bob Elliott) was tall and soft-spoken, always calming down the short loudmouth Bert (Ray Goulding) whenever something went wrong. The Bert and Harry commercials aired from December 1955 until 1960. In the 1960s, the brewery ran advertisements featuring New York City journalist Jimmy Breslin.

Like most regional breweries – including its New York competitors Ballantine, Schaefer, and Ruppert – Piels was facing an influx of national brands such as Schlitz, Pabst, and Budweiser. These brands, backed by massive advertising campaigns, began infiltrating Piels' primary sales territory and slowly overtook the market. This was coupled with a disastrous 81-day brewery strike in 1949 that allowed out-of-town brewers to establish a foothold in New York City and helped to end the Piels dynasty. An August 8, 1988, article in Sports Illustrated on beer and sports suggests the popularity of the Bert and Harry ads actually hurt Piels sales because people liked the ads, tried the beer and found out they did not actually enjoy it. Many of the Bert and Harry signs, trays and coasters with slogans (Harry: "Beer anyone?", Bert: "Piels everyone!") are now collector's items.

=== Expansion ===
In the 1950s, following the 1949 New York City brewery strike, Piels expanded greatly. In 1951, Piels bought Trommer's beer in Bushwick, Brooklyn, and in December 1953 the company bought the plant of Rubsam and Hormann in Stapleton, Staten Island, plus the R&H label. However, in 1955 as sales slowed down the Trommer plant was closed. In 1963, the R&H plant was also closed down. In 1963, the Piel management decided to sell the company, and it was acquired by Associated Brewing Company of Detroit, Michigan. They operated a chain of regional breweries, namely Jacob Schmidt (St. Paul, Minnesota), Sterling Brewers (Evansville, Indiana), Drewry’s (with plants in Chicago, Illinois and South Bend, Indiana) and Hampden-Harvard Breweries (Willimansett, Massachusetts). Hampden was its own label, named after the county where the brewery was located. By the end of the Willimansett operation, this brewery had prominent "Piels" signage for a time.

On September 20, 1973, Piel Bros. plant in East New York was closed down after 90 years of operation. For a short time the Willimansett plant, which brewed Piels for sales in New England, continued to operate, but then it was shut down. In the 1970s, F. & M. Schaefer Brewing Company, another Brooklyn based brewer, bought the rights to the Piel Brothers label, and Schaefer continued to brew it at its Brooklyn and Allentown, Pennsylvania, plants. In the late 1980s, Schaefer was subsequently bought out by Stroh Brewery Company of Detroit, Michigan. Under Stroh, Piels' sales stabilized for a time, thanks to new and improved package designs and good point of sale advertising. However, Stroh succumbed to marketing pressure from industry giants Anheuser-Busch and Miller, and threw in the towel after 149 years in business. Most of the Stroh brands, including Piels, were licensed to Pabst Brewing Company. Pabst discontinued the Piels label by April 2015.

== Revival ==
A new company, Piels Brewing Company based in New York, tried to acquired the rights to the brand. Piels Brewing Company is owned by the direct descendants of the former Piel Bros. LP, President, Thomas P. Hawkes. It relaunched the brand in the New York region in 2018.
