= Eclipse of the Assassins =

2015 non-fiction book by Russell H. Bartley and Sylvia Erickson Bartley

Eclipse of the Assassins. The CIA, Imperial Politics, and the Slaying of Mexican Journalist Manuel Buendía
- First edition
- Author: Russell H. Bartley and Sylvia Erickson Bartley
- Language: English
- Genre: Non-fiction
- Publisher: University of Wisconsin Press
- Publication date: 2015
- Publication place: United States

Eclipse of the Assassins. The CIA, Imperial Politics, and the Slaying of Mexican Journalist Manuel Buendía is a 2015 non-fiction book by historians Russell H. Bartley and Sylvia Erickson Bartley, published by University of Wisconsin Press. It discusses the murder of Manuel Buendía, and derives its title from a solar eclipse that took place over Mexico on May 30, 1984, the date of his assassination.

== Background ==
Buendía was a prominent Mexican journalist, whose murder in 1984 outraged Mexican journalists and columnists, and featured prominently in newspaper coverage at the time. When former DFS director José Antonio Zorrilla Pérez was indicted for the killing, some suspected that not only Pérez was responsible. University of Wisconsin professors Russell and Sylvia Bartley researched and wrote their book investigating Buendía's murder over about thirty years. The authors used court documents, interviews, newspaper articles, and other communications in their investigation.

== Contents ==
The book has seventeen chapters. The book first examines the murder itself, as well as the official investigation, and concludes that Pérez' conviction for the killing of Buendía was used to cover up the involvement of more senior Mexican officials, including, possibly, Mexico's Secretary of the Interior Manuel Bartlett Díaz.

The second part discusses the research into making the book. In this section, the authors use American court case files, and testimonies from former CIA and DEA agents, to argue that the CIA played a role in killing the journalist Buendía and DEA agent Enrique Camarena for their discovery of the Mexican government's collusion in CIA support for the Contras. The authors discuss broader Mexico-United States relations, which they characterize as marked by "a political culture of institutionalized collusion."

The end has the author's beliefs about the murder and a rebuttal of the official conclusion.

== Reception ==
Vanessa Freije of the University of Washington concluded that the book is "Accessibly written" and "offers important insights into Mexico’s dirty war and the US-Mexican relationship during the late Cold War." Freije stated that she wished that the book included "More critical attention to Buendía’s complex relationship with political power", as well as more information about Buendía himself and "the calculations that drove Mexican leaders to secretly support the Contras while publicly denouncing them."

Wil G. Pansters stated that it is "In many ways,[...]an impressive book." Pansters stated that this book and Mexico's Cold War show the involvement of the U.S. in Mexico and Latin American states other than Cuba during the Cold War. Pansters stated that the main issue of the book was that relevant figures had in mass journalism outlets, by 2013, already made statements supporting the authors' arguments, making the book out of date before it was published.
