= American Institute of Certified Planners =

Institute for certified professionals of the American Planning Association

American Institute of Certified Planners logo

The American Institute of Certified Planners (AICP) is a professional institute under the American Planning Association. AICP certifies professionals in the United States in the field of town planning and assists planners in the areas of ethics, professional development, planning education, and the standards of planning practice. Members of AICP pledge to adhere to a detailed Code of Ethics and Professional Conduct. Once certified, professional planners may place the designation "AICP" after their name to indicate their membership in AICP, and their mastery of the principles, skills, knowledge, and experience determined by the organization as essential for a professional planner.

To become certified, a planner must have a specified combination of relevant education and professional experience, must pass an examination that tests skills and knowledge, must pay an annual fee, and must be a member of the American Planning Association in good standing. The AICP certification exam is offered twice a year for two weeks, in May and November. Beginning in 2004 the exam uses a computer-based format. To maintain membership in AICP, a certified planner must earn a specified number of continuing education credit hours that include courses in planning law and ethics every two years.

== Experience ==
Combined with education, a potential candidate for the AICP exam must have a required number of years of professional planning experience. The amount of experience depends on education. The Planning Accreditation Board awards and certifies planning programs accreditation. If a prospective candidate has an accredited master's planning program, they will need two years of professional planning experience to receive AICP certification. Graduation from a non-accredited program with a master's degree in planning requires three years of experience. Graduating with a PAB accredited bachelor's planning degree, a person has to have three years of professional planning experience to receive AICP certification. Any other graduate or undergraduate degree requires four years of experience. Not having an undergraduate degree requires eight years of professional planning experience to receive AICP certification. The work experience may be gained before, during, or after one sits for the exam. A candidate who has passed the exam but does not yet have the experience required may use the title of "AICP Candidate".

On April 13, 2007, the AICP Commission approved a new Certification Maintenance (CM) program. As a result, AICP certified planners must earn and report 32 credits of eligible professional development activities every two years as part of this new CM requirement. This program replaced the voluntary Continuing Professional Development (CPD) program, which terminated on April 13, 2007.

== Outside of the United States ==
The recognized professional accreditation for planners in Canada is "MCIP," signifying that the holder of the designation is a full member of the Canadian Institute of Planners.

In Australia, the recognised accreditation for planners is 'CPP' - Certified Practising Planner, which indicates a member's status in the Planning Institute of Australia - PIA

In Nicaragua, the recognized accreditation for planners is 'APP' - Accredited Practicing Planner, which indicates a member's status in the Planning Institute of Nicaragua - PIN. The chairman of this institute is Alexander Alvarado.

In the United Kingdom, the recognized accreditation for planners is "MRTPI", which indicates a member's chartered status in the Royal Town Planning Institute.

== Certification ==
According to the American Planning Association, there are many public and private universities in the United States who have accredited Urban Planning Programs.

== See also ==
- Royal Town Planning Institute
