= Cultural diplomacy =

Exchange of culture between nations

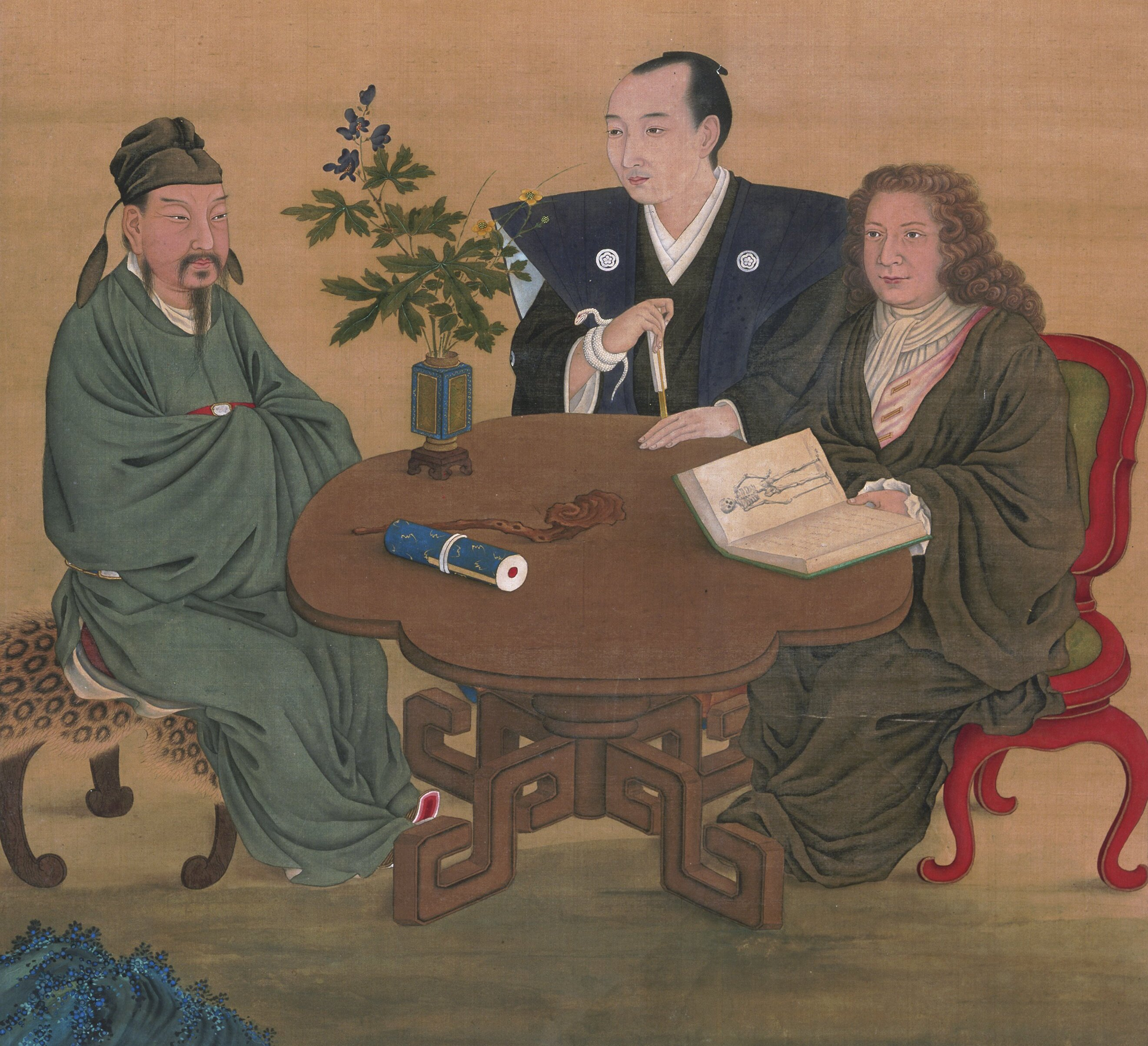
A meeting of Japan, China, and the West by Shiba Kokan. c. late 18th – c. early 19th century

Cultural diplomacy is a type of soft power that includes the "exchange of ideas, information, art, language and other aspects of culture among nations and their peoples in order to foster mutual understanding". The purpose of cultural diplomacy is for the people of a foreign nation to develop an understanding of the nation's ideals and institutions in an effort to build broad support for economic and political objectives. In essence "cultural diplomacy reveals the soul of a nation", which in turn creates influence. Public diplomacy has played an important role in advancing national security objectives.

== Definition ==
In a 2006 article in the Brown Journal of World Affairs, Cynthia P. Schneider wrote: "Public diplomacy consists of all a nation does to explain itself to the world, and cultural diplomacy – the use of creative expression and exchanges of ideas, information, and people to increase mutual understanding – supplies much of its content."

Culture is a set of values and practices that creates meaning for society. This includes both high culture (literature, art, and education, which appeals to elites) and popular culture (appeals to the masses). This is what governments seek to show foreign audiences when engaging in cultural diplomacy. It is a type of soft power, which is the "ability to get what you want through attraction rather than coercion or payments. It arises from a country's culture, political ideals and policies." This indicates that the value of culture is its ability to attract foreigners to a nation. Cultural diplomacy is also a component of public diplomacy. Public diplomacy is enhanced by a larger society and culture, but simultaneously public diplomacy helps to "amplify and advertise that society and culture to the world at large". It could be argued that the information component of public diplomacy can only be fully effective where there is already a relationship that gives credibility to the information being relayed. This comes from knowledge of the other's culture. Cultural diplomacy has been called the "linchpin of public diplomacy" because cultural activities have the potential to demonstrate the best of a nation.

Richard T. Arndt, a former State Department cultural diplomacy practitioner, said: "Cultural relations grow naturally and organically, without government intervention – the transactions of trade and tourism, student flows, communications, book circulation, migration, media access, inter-marriage – millions of daily cross-cultural encounters. If that is correct, cultural diplomacy can only be said to take place when formal diplomats, serving national governments, try to shape and channel this natural flow to advance national interests." While cultural diplomacy is a government activity, the private sector has a very real role to play because the government does not create culture, therefore, it can only attempt to make a culture known and define the impact this organic growth will have on national policies. Cultural diplomacy attempts to manage the international environment by utilizing these sources and achievements and making them known abroad. An important aspect of this is listening- cultural diplomacy is meant to be a two-way exchange. This exchange is then intended to foster a mutual understanding and thereby win influence within the target nation. Cultural diplomacy derives its credibility not from being close to government institutions, but from its proximity to cultural authorities.

== Objectives ==
Ultimately, the goal of cultural diplomacy is to influence a foreign audience and use that influence, which is built up over the long term, as a good will reserve to win support for policies. It seeks to harness the elements of culture to induce foreigners to:

- have a positive view of the country's people, culture and policies,
- induce greater cooperation between the two nations,
- aid in changing the policies or political environment of the target nation,
- prevent, manage and mitigate conflict with the target nation.

In turn, cultural diplomacy can help a nation better understand the foreign nation it is engaged with and it fosters mutual understanding. Cultural diplomacy is a way of conducting international relations without expecting anything in return in the way that traditional diplomacy typically expects. Cultural exchange programs work as a medium to relay a favourable impression of the foreign country in order to gain outsiders' understanding and approval in their cultural practices and naturalize their social norms among other cultures.

Generally, cultural diplomacy is more focused on the longer term and less on specific policy matters. The intent is to build up influence over the long term for when it is needed by engaging people directly. This influence has implications ranging from national security to increasing tourism and commercial opportunities. It allows the government to create a "foundation of trust" and a mutual understanding that is neutral and built on people-to-people contact. Another unique and important element of cultural diplomacy is its ability to reach youth, non-elites and other audiences outside of the traditional embassy circuit. In short, cultural diplomacy plants the seeds of ideals, ideas, political arguments, spiritual perceptions and a general view point of the world that may or may not flourish in a foreign nation. Therefore, ideologies spread by cultural diplomacy about American values enables those that seek a better life to look towards the Western world where happiness and freedom are portrayed as desirable and achievable goals.

== Connections to national security ==
Cultural diplomacy is a demonstration of national power because it demonstrates to foreign audiences every aspect of culture, including wealth, scientific and technological advances, competitiveness in everything from sports and industry to military power, and a nation's overall confidence. The perception of power has important implications for a nation's ability to ensure its security. Furthermore, because cultural diplomacy includes political and ideological arguments, and uses the language of persuasion and advocacy, it can be used as an instrument of political warfare and be useful in achieving traditional goals of war. A Chinese activist was quoted as saying "We've seen a lot of Hollywood movies – they feature weddings, funerals and going to court. So now we think it's only natural to go to court a few times in your life."

In terms of policy that supports national security goals, the information revolution has created an increasingly connected world in which public perceptions of values and motivations can create an enabling or disabling environment in the quest for international support of policies. The struggle to affect important international developments is increasingly about winning the information struggle to define the interpretation of states' actions. If an action is not interpreted abroad as the nation meant to it be, then the action itself can become meaningless.

Participants in cultural diplomacy often have insights into foreign attitudes that official embassy employees do not. This can be used to better understand a foreign nation's intentions and capabilities. It can also be used to counter hostile propaganda and the collection of open-source intelligence.

== Tools and examples ==
Cultural diplomacy relies on a variety of mediums, including:

- Arts including films, dance, music, painting, sculpture, among others.
- Exhibitions which offer the potential to showcase numerous objects of culture
- Educational programs such as universities and language programs abroad
- Exchanges – scientific, artistic, educational etc.
- Literature – the establishment of libraries abroad and translation of popular and national works
- Broadcasting of news and cultural programs
- Gifts to a nation, which demonstrates thoughtfulness and respect
- Religious diplomacy, including inter-religious dialogue
- Promotion and explanation of ideas and social policies
- Goodwill tours

All of these tools seek to bring understanding of a nation's culture to foreign audiences. They work best when they are proven to be relevant to the target audience. The tools can be utilized by working through NGOs, diasporas and political parties abroad, which may help with the challenge of relevance and understanding.

=== Arts ===
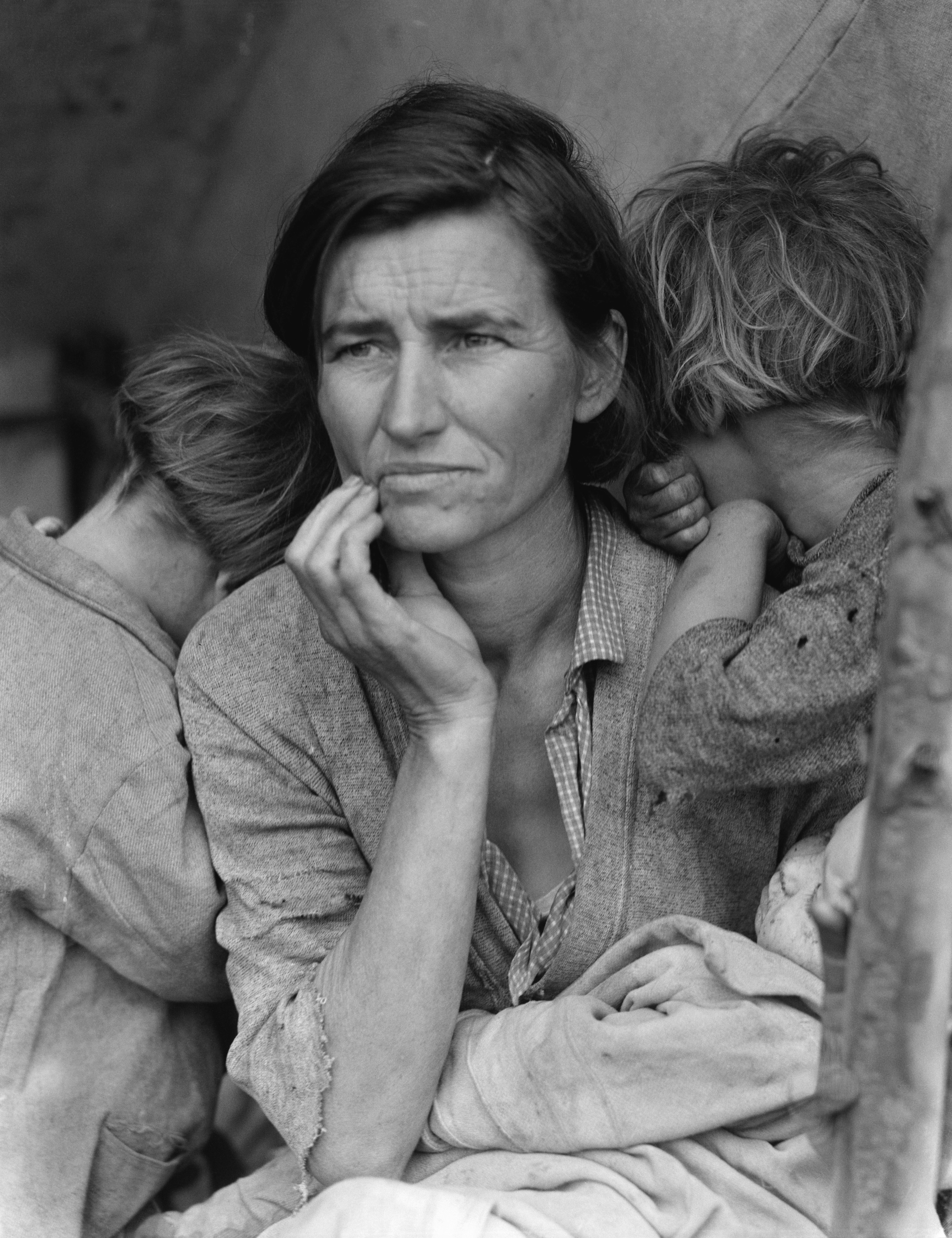
Migrant Mother (1936), Dorothea Lange

In the 1950s the Soviet Union had a reputation that was associated with peace, international class solidarity and progress due to its sponsorship of local revolutionary movements for liberation. The United States was known for its involvement in the Korean War and for preserving the status quo. In an effort to change this perception, the United States Information Agency (USIA) sponsored a photographic exhibition titled The Family of Man. The display originally showed in the Museum of Modern Art in New York City, but then USIA helped the display to be seen in 91 locations in 39 countries. The 503 photographs by 237 professional and amateur photographers were curated and put together by Edward Steichen. The images showed glimpses of everyday human life in its various stages; courtship, birth, parenting, work, self-expression, etc., including images from the Great Depression. The images were multi-cultured and only a few were overtly political serving to show the eclecticism and diversity of American culture, which is America's soft power foundation. The display was extremely popular and attracted large numbers of crowds, in short America "showed the world, the world and got credit for it".

A similar effort was carried out by the United States Department of State in February 2002 entitled Images from Ground Zero. The display included 27 images, detailing the September 11 attacks by Joel Meyerowitz that circulated, with the backing of embassies and consulates, to 60 nations. The display was intended to shape and maintain the public memory of the attack and its aftermath. The display sought to show the human side of the tragedy, and not just the destruction of buildings. The display was also intended to show a story of recovery and resolution through documenting not only the grief and pain, but also the recovery efforts. In many countries where the display was run, it was personalized for the population. For example, relatives of those who died in the Towers were often invited to the event openings.

=== Dance ===
The positioning of the performing arts throughout history shows that dance was a tool for showing power, promoting national pride, and maintaining international relations. During the Cold War, the plot and choreography choices used in dance demonstrated Socialist vs. Capitalist values. Through this, countries were able to share their ideas. In 1955, the United States state department sent the Martha Graham Dance Company to many countries affected by the Cold War. Some of these countries included Burma, India, Pakistan, Japan, the Philippines, and Thailand which were all a concern to the United States because they could be easily lost to Communism as predicted in Eisenhower's Domino Theory. The choreography mixed Asian aesthetics with American values, creating an innovative performance that showed what the United States and a capitalist society was capable of producing. Her performances were received with praise and repositioned the image of the United States in the eyes of the international community.

Cultural diplomacy through the arts was also used by the Soviet Union due to the high value they placed on culture and the belief it could unite people. The "New Soviet Man" was expected to have an understanding of the arts and be able to contribute to society. In 1959, the Soviet Union decided to send one of its highly regarded ballet companies, the Bolshoi, to tour the United States. Their goal was to demonstrate the artistic and physical abilities of their citizens. The repertoire included Romeo and Juliet, Swan Lake, Giselle, and The Stone Flower. There were also two mixed bills that included both pre and post-revolutionary content. Swan Lake and its composer, P. I. Tchaikovsky, were considered Russian classics that fit into Marxist ideology and were therefore accepted in the Communist repertoire. Other classic ballets were redesigned to demonstrate this ideology. While Americans were extremely excited to see the ballets and praised the ballerinas, the repertoire was not received as well. This was a tool critics used to express the joy of seeing the ballet company while critiquing Soviet politics. The complaint that Communism was an old-fashioned ideology was given life as most of the ballets performed were classical pieces. Dance produced in the United States, for example Balanchine and Martha Graham, was seen as modern with an individualistic style.

A later example of dance during the Cold War was the Soviet Union and the United States exchanging ballet companies for a time in order to improve cultural relations. In October 1962, the New York City Ballet (NYCB) toured the Soviet Union. In New York City, the Bolshoi was performing Spartacus by Aram Khachaturian. This ballet was meant to excite American audiences and prove that the Soviet Union could produce new, action-packed performances. The Soviet Union's creation was still not considered innovative because the Hollywood film Spartacus by Stanley Kubrick had been released prior to this performance. At the same time, seventeen ballets by George Balanchine, who is considered a very influential figure in American ballet though he was born in Russia, were being performed in the Soviet Union. Once again ballet was used to showcase artistry and power while bettering international affairs. Many factors made this tour a pinnacle in Cold war exchanges. The tour occurred at the same time as the Cuban Missile Crisis. Also, NYCB making an appearance in the Soviet Union was questionable because reviews of Balanchine's ballets had been censored. Instead of feelings of hostility, the company received a warm welcome. Both the United States and the Soviet Union agreed with Balanchine's decision to emphasize music throughout his choreography. There was still a fundamental disagreement to this as Balanchine often declared that music has no meaning and Soviet society did not have the same ideology. Because each company's ballets were being judged with preconceived notions about society and the arts, opinions clashed and interpretations were different. The United States was mainly known for producing abstract modern pieces which align with Capitalist and individualistic thinking. On the other hand, the Soviet Union was producing narrative ballets which were meant to reeducate citizens and emphasize the importance of society. These exchanges were also seen as a battle between Capitalism and Communism, with each showing off its values and power. These are only a few examples of dance being used to showcase artistry and power while bettering international affairs.

=== Exhibitions ===
Soviet Pepsi label

During World War II, exhibitions which promoted Pan-Americanism, inter-american solidarity and commerce between the nations of both North and South America were occasionally mounted by major American retailers. They typically included an assortment of fine art, sculpture, fashion and consumer merchandise designed to showcase the excellence of South American craftmanship for American consumers. In 1942, for example, Macy's mounted a Latin American Fair in collaboration with officials from the United States government for over 800,000 members of the general public in New York City. Included among the dignitaries attending the fair were ambassadors from South American, Nelson Rockefeller and the First Lady Eleanor Roosevelt, who formally opened the exhibition. In the same year, Gimbels followed suit and launched its own Gimbels Centennial Exhibit which included an exhibit of South American & Pre-Columbian Art including works from Peru.

Exhibitions were often used during the Cold War to demonstrate culture and progress by both the United States and the Soviet Union. In 1959, the American National Exhibition was held on Sokolniki Park in Moscow. The exhibition was opened by Vice President Richard Nixon and attended by Walt Disney, Buckminster Fuller, William Randolph Hearst, and senior executives from Pepsi, Kodak and Macy's. It featured American consumer goods, cars, boats, RCA color TVs, food, clothing, etc., and samples of American products such as Pepsi. There was a typical American kitchen set up inside in which spectators could watch a Bird's Eye frozen meal be prepared. An IBM RAMAC computer was programmed to answer 3,500 questions about America in Russian. The most popular question was "what is the meaning of the American Dream?" The Soviets tried to limit the audience by only giving tickets to party members and setting up their own rival exhibition. But ultimately people came, and the souvenir pins that were given out turned up in every corner of the country. The Soviets banned printed material, but the Americans gave it out anyway. The most popular items were the Bible and a Sears catalogue. The guides for the exhibition were American graduate students, including African Americans and women, who spoke Russian. This gave Russians the ability to speak to real Americans and ask difficult questions. The ambassador to Moscow, Llewellyn Thompson, commented that "the exhibition would be 'worth more to us than five new battleships."

=== Exchanges ===
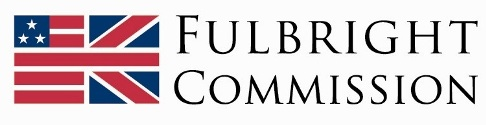
New US-UK Fulbright logo

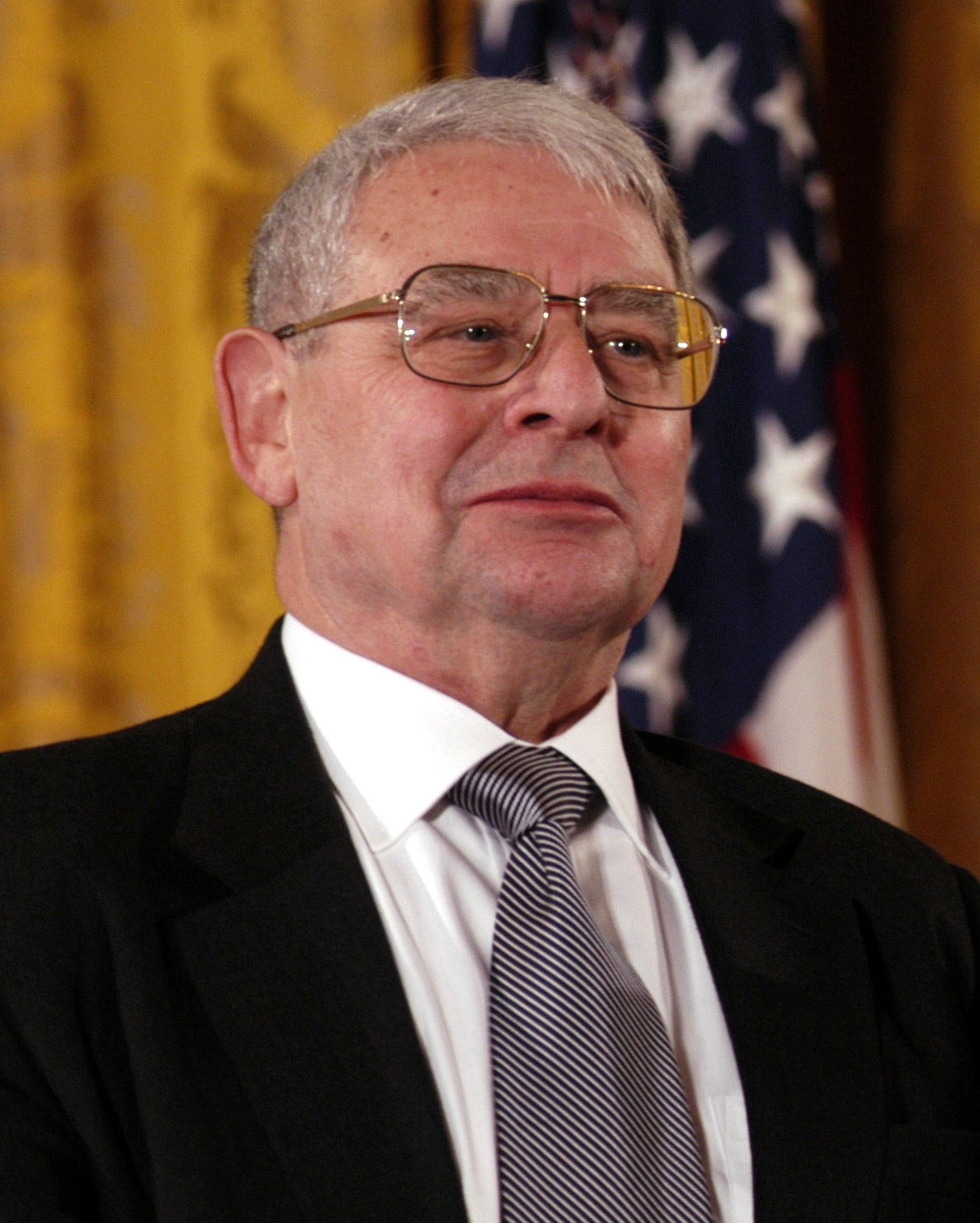
Fulbright Fellow Riccardo Giacconi was a pioneer of X-ray astronomy.

The usefulness of exchanges is based on two assumptions- some form of political intent lies behind the exchange and the result will have some sort of political effect. The idea is that exchanges will create a network of influential people abroad that will tie them to their host country and will appreciate their host country more due to their time spent there. Exchanges generally take place at a young age, giving the host country the opportunity to create an attachment and gain influence at a young impressionable age.

An example of exchanges is the United States' Fulbright Program.

The US and Soviet Union hosted a range of educational exchange programs during the Cold War.

=== TV, music, film ===
Popular entertainment is a statement about the society which it is portraying. These cultural displays can carry important messages regarding individualism, consumer choices and other values. For example, Soviet audiences watching American films learned that Americans owned their own cars, did not have to stand in long lines to purchase food, and did not live in communal apartments. These observations were not intended to be political messages when Hollywood created the films, but they nonetheless carried them.

Cultural programming featuring Latin Jazz music and the Bolero was already recognized by the United States Department of State as an important diplomatic tool during the World War II period. In the early 1940s, Nelson Rockefeller at the Office of the Coordinator of Inter-American Affairs collaborated with Edmund A. Chester of the CBS to showcase leading musicians from both North and South America for audiences on both continents. Musical artists such as Alfredo Antonini, Terig Tucci, John Serry Sr., Miguel Sandoval, Juan Arvizu, Elsa Miranda, Eva Garza, Manuolita Arriola, Kate Smith and Nestor Mesta Chayres participated in this truly international effort to foster peace throughout the Americas through shared musical performances on CBS's La Cadena de las Americas network. (See Viva América).

External audio
- You may hear the Alfredo Antonini Orchestra with Néstor Mesta Cháyres and John Serry Sr. performing the bolero "La Morena de me Copla" in 1946 Here on DAHR
- You may listen to radio broadcasts of performances by the Seventh Army Symphony Orchestra from 1956–1960 here on 7aso.org

In the post World War II era, the United States Army also acknowledged the importance of cultural programming as a valuable diplomatic tool amidst the ruins in Europe. In 1952 the U.S. Seventh Army enlisted the expertise of the young conductor Samuel Adler to establish the Seventh Army Symphony Orchestra in Stuttgart, Germany in order to demonstrate the shared cultural heritage of America and Europe. Performances of classical music by the orchestra continued throughout Europe until 1962. They showcased the talents of several noted conductors and musicians including: James Dixon, John Ferritto, Henry Lewis and Kenneth Schermerhorn.

As the Cold War between the United States and the Soviet Union escalated in the 1950s, the Department of State also supported the performance of classical music as an indispensable diplomatic tool. With this in mind, President Dwight D. Eisenhower established an Emergency Fund for International Affairs in 1954 to stimulate the presentation of America's cultural achievements to international audiences in the realms of dance, theatre and music. In 1954, the State Department's Cultural Presentations program established a cooperative relationship with the Music Advisory Panel of the American National Theatre and Academy (ANTA) to evaluate potential musical performers who could best represent America at performance venues throughout the world. Members of the advisory panel included such noted American composers and academics as: Virgil Thomson, Howard Hanson at the Eastman School of Music, William Schuman at the Juilliard School, Milton Katims, and the music critic Alfred Frankenstein. In addition, the State Department selected Hanson's Eastman Philharmonic Orchestra to perform during a sweeping international cultural exchange tour in 1961-1962. Concert performances by this elite group of students from the Eastman School of Music were received to critical acclaim by enthusiastic audiences in thirty four cities in sixteen countries throughout Europe, the Middle East and Russia. Similarly, the bass-baritone William Warfield was recruited by the Department of State to perform in six separate European tours during the 1950s which featured productions of the opera Porgy and Bess

Jazz played a critical role during the Cold War in establishing political ties. Producer Willis Conover explained jazz as an embodiment of an anti-ideology or an alternative way of living by introducing a new style of music with a loose structure and improvisation. In November 1955, The New York Times declared Louis Armstrong as America's most effective ambassador. What American diplomats could not do, Armstrong and his jazz music did. This article claimed that musicians, such as Armstrong, created a universal language to communicate.

Jazz originally surfaced in the Soviet Union during the 1920s and 1930s, but quickly faded. After World War II, jazz began to reemerge, but was condemned by Andrei Zhdanov. He considered jazz as corrupt and capitalistic due to the fact that it grew out of the United States during a time of political unrest. During the 1950s to 1960s, the Civil Rights Movement, the decolonization of Africa and Asia, and the cultural and political rivalry of the United States and the Soviet Union created the need for cultural exchange. As a result, the United States government sent a jazz band composed of African American musicians abroad to tour places, including the Middle East and Africa, with the goal of the black musicians establishing connections with their African heritage.

Duke Ellington, B.B. King, and Dizzy Gillespie all made trips to Africa that fostered connections with the African diaspora. In 1956, Dizzy Gillespie took on the role as a musical ambassador during his trip to the Middle East. He reported to President Eisenhower that he and his jazz band were effective against Red propaganda. With their interracial group, the jazz band was able to communicate across social and language barriers. During the band's trip to Athens, Greece, a performance transformed an audience of Anti-American students angered by the U.S. stance on Greece's right-wing dictatorship. By the end of the performance, Gillespie said the audience loved the music and threw him up on their shoulders after the performance. Diplomats emphasized the positive effects of musical diplomacy on the public.

From 1955 to 1996, jazz producer Willis Conover hosted a music program called "Music USA," for the Voice of America to assist in the emergence of jazz musicians as U.S. ambassadors. Conover explained: "Jazz is a cross between total discipline and anarchy," for the way the musicians agree on tempo, key, and chord, but is distinguishable by its freedom of expression. As many as thirty million listeners worldwide, including millions in the Soviet Union, listened to the forty-five minutes of pop music and forty-five minutes of jazz with a newscast preceding each. Many critics have stated that Conover's program played a major role in the resurgence of jazz within the Soviet Union after the WWII.

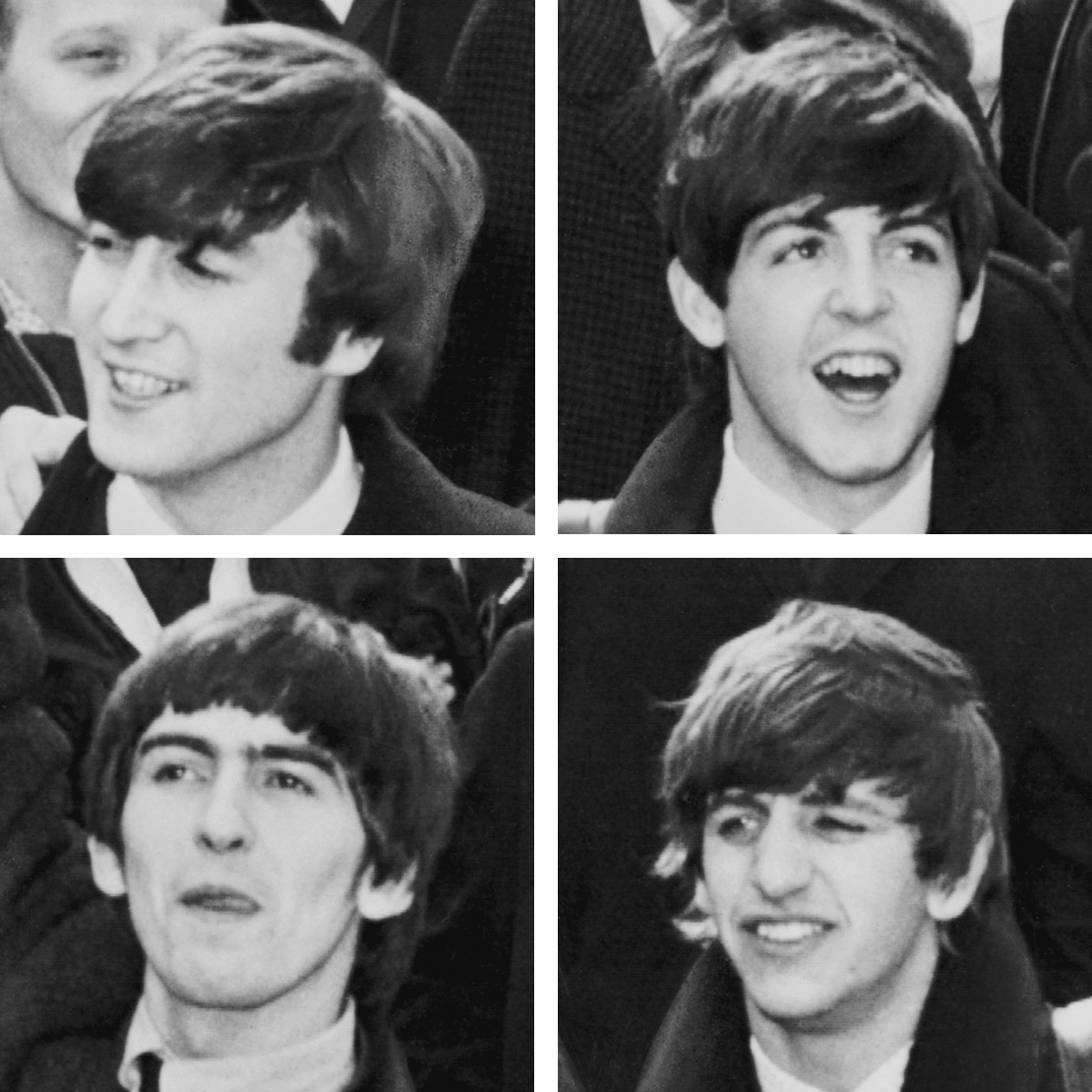
The Beatles

The effect The Beatles had in Russia during the Cold War is an example of how music artists and their songs can become political. During this time, rock music channelled liberal "Western" ideas as a progressive and modernized art form. The Beatles symbolized the Western culture in a way that introduced new ideas that many believe assisted in the collapse of communism. As a result, the Beatles served as cultural diplomats through their popularity in the Soviet Union. Their music fostered youth communication and united people with a common spirit of popular culture.

Kolya Vasin, the founder of The Beatles museum and the Temple of Love, Peace and Music in St. Petersburg, commented that The Beatles "were like an integrity test. When anyone said anything against them, we knew just what that person was worth. The authorities, our teachers, even our parents, became idiots to us." Despite the attempts of the Soviet Union's government to prevent the spread of the Beatles' popularity amongst their citizens, the band proved to be as popular in the USSR as it was in Britain. The government went as far as censoring the expression of all Western ideals, including the Beatles' bourgeois eccentricity, limiting the Soviet citizens' access to their music. Leslie Woodland, a documentary film maker, commented regarding what the Russian people were told about the West – "Once people heard the Beatles' wonderful music, it just didn't fit. The authorities' prognosis didn't correspond to what they were listening to. The system was built on fear and lies, and in this way, the Beatles put an end to the fear, and exposed the lies." Pavel Palazchenko, Mikhail Gorbachev's conference interpreter, stated that the Beatles' music was a "source of musical relief. They helped us create a world of our own, a world different from the dull and senseless ideological liturgy that increasingly reminded me of Stalinism...". Like Gorbachev, many Russian youth agreed that the Beatles were a way to overcome the cultural isolation imposed by the Cold War and reinforced by their current political system.

In this way the music of The Beatles struck a political chord in the Soviet Union, even when the songs were not meant to be political. This contact went both ways. In 1968, when the song "Back in the USSR" was released, the album included a quote on the cover from Paul McCartney that read "In releasing this record, made especially and exclusively for the USSR, I am extending a hand of peace and friendship to the Soviet people." During Paul McCartney's first trip to Russia in May 2003, nearly half a million fans greeted him. One Russian critic reported, "The only person in Red Square who wasn't moved was Lenin". This is an example of how products of culture can have an influence on the people they reach outside of their own country. It also shows how a private citizen can unintentionally become a cultural ambassador of sorts.

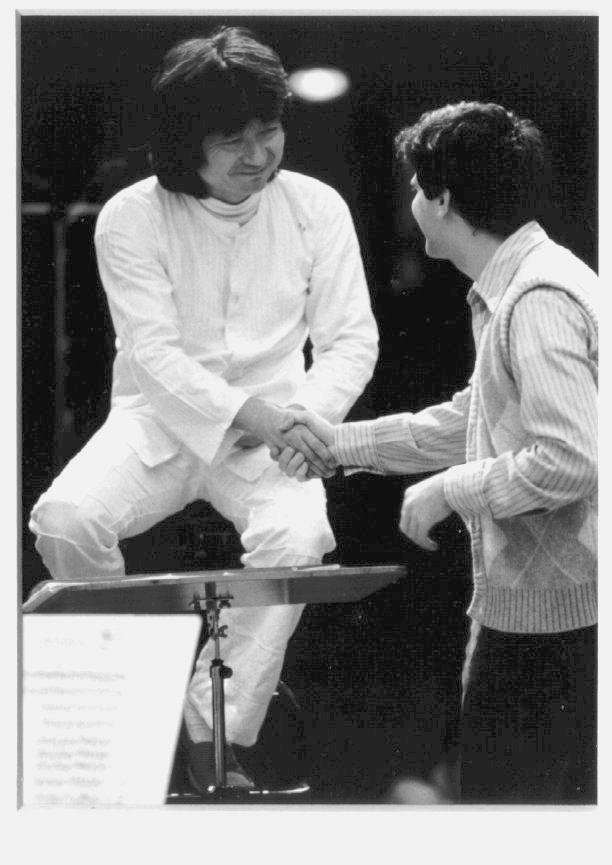
Ozawa with George Sakakeeny, New Japan Philharmonic

Similarly, individual conductors of internationally recognized symphonic orchestras engaged in their own form of cultural diplomacy by harnessing the power of music to transcend artificial political boundaries as the Cold War continued to evolve in the 1970s. As part of an effort to raise public awareness of the dangers posed by nuclear weapons in particular and by the culture of waging war in general, conductors such as Leonard Bernstein and Seiji Ozawa organized a series of "Concerts for Peace" at several symbolic concert venues which attracted international attention. Included among them were: the Japanese city of Hiroshima (1973), the National Cathedral in Washington D.C. (1973), the United Nations General Assembly in New York City (1974), and the Salzburg Music Festival in Austria (1976). As Ozawa himself noted, "One does not need to raise a lot of money to put on a concert in a large hall in order to express one's beliefs [in peace]." Having noted that, "Hiroshima belongs to the world" Ozawa continued to conduct additional peace concerts for audiences numbering over 8,000 in both Nagasaki and Hiroshima for over three decades (1973-2005).

In September 2023, U.S. Secretary of State Antony Blinken launched the Global Music Diplomacy Initiative in partnership with The Recording Academy at the U.S. Department of State.

South Korean popular music, or K-pop, has been described as a contemporary example of popular culture functioning as cultural diplomacy. Since the 1990s, the Korean Ministry of Culture (now the Ministry of Culture, Sports, and Tourism) has promoted Korean culture as part of a long-term strategy of nation branding. The group BTS have served as actual and de facto cultural ambassadors for South Korea. Analysis of English-language Western media coverage suggests that reporting of BTS has shifted perceptions of South Korea from a nation of imitation to one of innovation.

There are growing calls for Australia to strengthen its music diplomacy activities.

=== Food ===
The US Embassy in Beijing leveraged food as a tool of diplomacy in 2023, when its public affairs section collected lunch photos from officers posted across the country and created a "photo montage video titled "What American Diplomats Have for Lunch," which became one of the most-viewed and most-engaged posts on its WeChat and Weibo accounts.

=== Place branding ===
This Image and reputation has become an essential part of a "state's strategic equity". Place branding is "the totality of the thoughts, feelings, associations and expectations that come to mind when a prospect or consumer is exposed to an entity's name, logo, products, services, events, or any design or symbol representing them." Place branding is required to make a country's image acceptable for investment, tourism, political power, etc. As Joseph Nye commented, "in an information age, it is often the side which has the better side of the story that wins", this has resulted in a shift from old style diplomacy to encompass brand building and reputation management. In short, a country can use its culture to create a brand for itself which represents positive values and image.

=== Museum diplomacy ===
Museum diplomacy is a subset of cultural diplomacy concerned with museums and the cultural artifacts they exhibit. This can take the form of building/supporting museums, gifting art/antiquities, and travelling exhibitions.

France has led the way in using the return on art and artifacts looted during their colonial past to its home country for diplomatic means.

In 1974, People's Republic of China organized its first archaeological exhibition in the United States, The Exhibition of Archaeological Finds of the People's Republic of China, held at the National Gallery of Art in Washington, D.C. during the Cold War. This exhibition, showcasing 385 artifacts, was a strategic act of cultural diplomacy, aimed at improving China–United States relations while also promoting China's state ideology.

=== Panda diplomacy ===
China has been using panda diplomacy to advance its national interests.

=== Goodwill tours ===
A goodwill tour is a tour by someone or something famous to a series of places, with the purpose of expressing benevolent interest or concern for a group of people or a region, improving or maintaining a relationship between parties, and exhibiting the item or person to places visited.

Goodwill tours are meant to be friendly; however, in some cases, they may be intimidating to the people or the government at the place visited. At the same time, a visit by a goodwill tour might be used as a way of "reminding" the place and government visited of a friendship previously established or assumed.

Notable goodwill tours include the Latin America goodwill tour by President-elect Herbert Hoover in November–December 1928, the goodwill tour to Japan by the San Francisco Seals (baseball) in 1949,Jacqueline Kennedy's 1962 goodwill tour of India and Pakistan, and the worldwide GIANTSTEP-APOLLO 11 Presidential Goodwill Tour by the Apollo 11 astronauts in 1969.

== Complications ==
Cultural diplomacy presents a number of unique challenges to any government attempting to carry out cultural diplomacy programs. Most ideas that a foreign population observes are not in the government's control. The government does not usually produce the books, music, films, TV programs, consumer products, etc. that reaches an audience. The most the government can do is try to work to create openings so the message can get through to mass audiences abroad. To be cultural relevant in the age of globalization, a government must exercise control over the flows of information and communication technologies, including trade. This is also difficult for governments that operate in a free market society where the government does not control the bulk of information flows. What the government can do is work to protect cultural exports where they flourish, by utilizing trade agreements or gaining access for foreign telecommunication networks.

It is also possible that foreign government officials may oppose or resist certain cultural exports while the people cheer them on. This can make support for official policies difficult to obtain. Cultural activities may be both a blessing and a curse to a nation. This may be the case if certain elements of a culture are offensive to the foreign audience. Certain cultural activities can also undermine national policy objectives. An example of this was the very public American dissent to the Iraq War while official government policy still supported it. Simultaneously the prevalence of the protest may have attracted some foreigners to the openness of America.

== Sample institutions ==
- Brazilian Cultural Center, Brazil
- Confucius Institute, People's Republic of China
- Caro and Cuervo Institute, Colombia
- Czech Centres, Czech Republic
- Danish Cultural Institute, Denmark (1940– )
- European Union National Institutes for Culture, European Union
- Alliance Française, France
- Institut Français, France
- Finnish Cultural and Academic Institutes, Finland
- Goethe-Institut, Germany
- Center for the Greek Language, Greece
- Hellenic Foundation for Culture, Greece
- Balassi Institute, Hungary (1927– )
- Indian Council for Cultural Relations, India
- (Republic of Ireland) Culture Ireland, Ireland
- Istituto Italiano di Cultura, Italy
- Dante Alighieri Society, Italy
- EMMA for Peace, Italy
- Jewish Agency for Israel, Israel
- Japan Foundation, Japan
- Korean Friendship Association, North Korea
- Sentro Rizal, Philippines
- Adam Mickiewicz Institute, Poland
- Polish Institute, Poland
- Instituto Camões, Portugal
- Romanian Cultural Institute, Romania
- Russkiy Mir Foundation, Russia
- Korean Cultural Center, South Korea
- Korean Foundation, South Korea
- Instituto Cervantes, Spain
- Swedish Institute, Sweden
- Ukrainian Institute, Ukraine
- British Council, United Kingdom (1934– )
- Bureau of Educational and Cultural Affairs, United States
- United States Information Agency, United States (1953–99)
- Yunus Emre Institute, Turkey

== See also ==
- Culinary diplomacy
- Digital diplomacy
- Panda diplomacy
- Paradiplomacy
- Public diplomacy
- Science diplomacy
- Soft power
- Twin towns and sister cities
