= Mikko Innanen =

Mikko Innanen may refer to:

- Mikko Innanen (footballer)
- Mikko Innanen (musician)
