= Rent Romus =

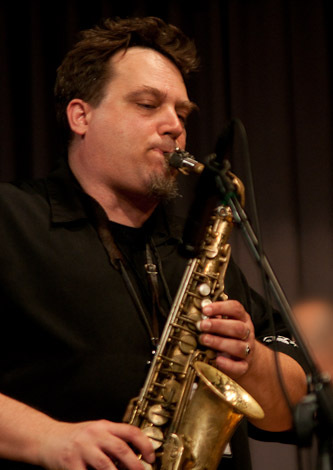
- Rent Romus at the San Francisco Community Music Center

Background information
- Born: January 6, 1968 (age 58)
- Origin: San Francisco, California, USA
- Genres: Free jazz Avant-garde jazz experimental
- Occupations: Saxophonist, bandleader, composer, record producer
- Instruments: Alto, soprano, c-melody saxophone
- Years active: 1987 – present
- Labels: Edgetone Records, Jazzheads Records
- Website: www.romus.net

Rent Romus (born 1968) is an American saxophonist and multi-instrumentalist, bandleader, music and performing arts producer, and community leader living in the San Francisco Bay area.

== Biography ==
=== Beginnings ===
Romus was born in Hancock, Michigan. He began playing piano at the age of five until he was thirteen when he decided to play the alto saxophone, which his mother also played. In 1982 and 1984, Romus attended the Stanford Jazz Workshop summer programs where he participated in master classes led by Stan Getz, Bruce Forman, Eddie Moore, and Dizzy Gillespie. Romus's exposure to Stan Getz was a pivotal moment in his early development where Getz would ask him to find a mirror and work on his tone watching his embouchure as he played. His pivotal experience with the tenor saxophonist was when Getz picked up his horn and joined him in a rendition of the song "I’ll Remember April" during a master class. When Romus was sixteen years of age, his first experience in curation was hoisted upon him after his high school teacher Dick Goodrich quit his job leaving him in charge of a 17-piece big band called the North Area Youth Jazz Ensemble (NAYJE). From 1987 - 1991 he attended the University of California, Santa Cruz. While at college he led the band Jazz on the Line which he had founded alongside saxophonist/composer Michael Sidney Timpson in 1984, that served as a vehicle for the members' compositions and performances.

=== Nineties ===
Between 1989 and 1994 Romus produced three albums with Jazz on the Line including In the Moment with tenor saxophonist Chico Freeman. Other performing members during the group's history included saxophonist Dan Magay, pianist Stephano DeZerega, trumpeter Jason Olaine, vocalist Anna Gurski, and drummer Ben Leinbach. Other guest artists included drummer Steve Rossi, bassists Ravi Abcarian, Corin Stiggall, and Ernie Provenchure. After graduating from the University of California, Santa Cruz in 1992, Romus worked odd jobs before moving to San Francisco in 1993 where he formed a trio with drummer James Zitro and former Sun Ra Arkestra cellist Kash Killion, originally called the RKZtet and later dubbed the Lords of Outland. In 1995 Romus changed personnel of the group to include his longtime associate Jason Olaine along with drummer Andrew Borger and bassist Vytas Nagisetty (aka Brock Lee). That same year he recorded the first Lords of Outland album entitled You'll Never Be the Same. In the summer of 1995 and 1996 Romus toured in Denmark with pianist Jonas Müller, drummer Tomas Barfod, drummer Stefan Pasborg which later led to his 1999 recording with Pasborg and bassist Jonas Westergaard as the Life's Blood Trio. In 1997 Romus performed and recorded with Jon Birdsong, Dave Mihaly, and guest tenor saxophonist John Tchicai known best for his work with John Coltrane and Albert Ayler in the 1960s. In 1998 Romus worked with instrument inventor Tom Nunn, cellist Doug Carroll, guitarist Joel Harrison and drummer Dave Mihaly. This formation focused on a set of compositions inspired by the writings of author Philip K. Dick.

=== New millennium ===
In 2001 Romus reinvented the Lords of Outland with bassist Bill Noertker, drummer Dave Mihaly and the late trombonist Toyoji Tomita, and later that year recorded Avatar In the Field a tribute to the late saxophonist Albert Ayler . In 2002 Romus began working with poet/musician/artist CJ Borosque whom he later married. Together they produced The Metal Quan Yin (destinations suite) with an expanded group that included vocalist Jesse Quattro and Andre Custodio, based on her self-published book of the same name. That same year also marked a shift in Romus’ musical exploration branching out into complete free improvisation when he alongside guitarist Ernesto Diaz-Infante created The Abstractions, a collective ensemble that ranged in size from two to ten players. The group toured the west coast of the United States in 2002 and 2004 and released three recordings and included Jesse Quattro, Scott R Looney, Bob Marsh, Philip Everett, Sandor Finta, CJ Borosque, Ray Schaeffer, Lance Grabmiller, Alwyn Quebido, and Dina Emerson. In 2006 Romus toured through the midwest of the United States performing in St. Louis Missouri, Urbana Illinois, Detroit Michigan, and Columbus Ohio with stops along the east coast to Philadelphia and New York City with composer and pianist Thollem McDonas and drummer Jon Brumit as the Bloom Project. In contrast to the Lords of Outland, Bloom Project featured a more sparse melodic repertoire. During that same year Romus shifted the roster of the current Lords of Outland with drummer Philip Everett, bassist Ray Schaeffer, and CJ Borosque on no-input effects pedals mixing harsh noise and free improvisation and producing recordings to present day.

== Curator, producer ==
From his first experience as a young music producer in 1984 with the North Area Youth Jazz Ensemble (NAYJE), Romus continued to produce and curate performances and presentations in the San Francisco Bay Area. Romus runs Edgetone Records, launched in 1991 originally as a vanity label to support his recordings, and later in 2001 began releasing other artists primarily from the San Francisco Bay Area crossing many forms of improvised and experimental music. He was the executive director of Jazz in Flight from 1996 to 1997 a non-profit jazz presenting organization based in Oakland California until it disbanded in 2001, which booked creative touring and local performing musicians at Yoshi's (jazz club) in Oakland California. He founded Outsound Presents, a non-profit artist-based organization and serves as the executive director while curating The SIMM Music Series at the Musicians Union Hall as well as the Luggage Store Gallery New Music Series in San Francisco. Romus co-founded and was the Director of Promotion for the SFAlt Festival in 2002-04 which led him to create and organize the annual Edgetone New Music Summit, a national experimental music festival held in the greater San Francisco Bay Area. The festival is now produced under the Outsound Presents banner which continues at the present under the title, Outsound New Music Summit.

== Discography ==
=== As leader or co-leader ===
- Jazz on the Line, Dark Wind, 1988
- Jazz on the Line, no boundaries, 1991
- Jazz on the Line with Chico Freeman, In The Moment, 1994
- You'll Never Be The Same, Lords of Outland, 1995
- Adapt...or DIE!, Lords of Outland with John Tchicai, 1997
- Blood Motions, Life's Blood Trio, 1999
- Avatar In the Field – A Tribute to Albert Ayler, Lords of Outland, 2001
- Out of Town - Guinea Pig, 2001
- PKD Vortex Project, Lords of Outland, inspired by the Stories of Phil K. Dick, 2001
- The Metal Quan Yin, Lords of Outland with poet CJ Borosque, 2002
- Sonic Conspiracy, The Abstractions, 2002
- ARS VIVENDE, The Abstractions, 2003
- Novo Navigatio, The Abstractions, 2004
- The Foolkiller, Tri-Cornered Tent Show, 2005
- Reverberations of Spring Past, 2006
- Culture of Pain, Lords of Outland, 2006
- Bloom, Bloom Project with Thollem Mcdonas, Jon Brumit, and Steven Baker, 2006
- You can sleep when you're dead!, Lords of Outland, 2008
- Prismatic Season, Bloom Project, 2008
- Thundershine, Jazz On The Line with Chico Freeman (re-issue of In The Moment), 2008
- GRID, Ministry of Rites, 2008
- Sudden Aurora, Bloom Project with Thollem Mcdonas, 2009
- XV (the first fifteen years 1994–2009), Lords of Outland, 2009
- Emergency Rental, The Emergency String (X)tet meet Rent Romus, 2010
- Edge of Dark, Lords of Outland with Vinny Golia, 2011
- Cloudknitter Suite, Lords of Outland 2012
- Thee Unhip, Lords of Outland 2012
- Truth Teller, Life's Blood Ensemble 2013
- The Proceedings of Dr. Ké, Lords of Outland 2014
- Cimmerian Crossroads, Life's Blood Ensemble 2014
- Lords O Leaping, Lords of Outland 2014
- The Otherworld Cycle, Life's Blood Ensemble 2015
- LiR, Rent Romus with Teddy Rankin-Parker and Daniel Pearce 2016
- Rising Colossus, Life's Blood Ensemble 2016
- Deciduous, Midwestern Edition Vol. 1 2017
- In the darkness we speak a sound brightness and life, Lords of Outland 2017
- The Expedition, Rent Romus with Rob Pumpelly and Eli Wallace 2017
- Rogue Star, Life's Blood Ensemble 2018
- Live at Malmitalo, Otherworld Ensemble 2018
- Northern Fire, Otherworld Ensemble 2018
- side three New Work, Life's Blood Ensemble 2019
- 25 years under the mountain, Lords of Outland 2019
- The New Neighbors, Guinea Pig 2020
- Manala, Rent Romus Heikki Koskinen and Life's Blood Ensemble 2020
- Return from Manala, Otherworld Ensemble 2020
- we are sparks in the universe to our own fire, ruth weiss 2021
- Baptismal, Actual/Actual 2022

=== As a sideman ===
- Paris Slim with Joe Lewis Walker, Sonny Rhodes, Bleedin’ Heart, 1996
- Jim Ryan's Forward Energy Configurations, 2002
- Moe!kestra!, Two Forms of Multitudes, 2003
- Tri-Cornered Tent Show, Legion of Dagon, 2004
- C.O.M.A. California Outside Music Associates, 2004
- Reverberations from Spring Past, 2005
- Tri-Cornered Tent Show, The Foolkiller, 2006
- Jim Ryan's Forward Energy, The Awakening, 2012
- T.D. Skatchit & Company, Ear of the Storm, 2013
- Heikki Koskinen, Sisällä/Ulkona (Inside/Outside), 2016
- ruth weiss, Jazz & Haiku, 2018
- Trouble Ensemble, In the Water, 2018
- Zell Morris Trio, The one time we met, 2022

== Filmography ==
- Ruth Weiss: the Beat Goddess (Documentary) 2019
- One More Step West is the Sea: Ruth Weiss (Documentary) 2021
