= Jazz on the Line =

Jazz on the Line is a San Francisco Bay Area jazz sextet formed in the early 1980s by Rent Romus. At its initial inception, it primarily featured the compositions of its co-founders and included notable musicians such as saxophonist/composer Michael Sidney Timpson, saxophonist Dan Magay and drummer Steve Rossi.

In the mid-eighties, Romus, moving to Santa Cruz, took over as primary leader and composer for the ensemble, and gave it greater professional exposure.

The group, under the helm of Romus, continued to perform live throughout the nineties, releasing its first CD "No Boundaries" in 1991. Its most recent CD from 2008, "Thundershine" features notable saxophonist Chico Freeman. Other recordings by the group include the CDs entitled "Strap" also titled Filmtrax-ROBOT (Rats and Other Memos) and "Dark Wind".

Romus also founded the quartet the Lords of Outland, who released the album You'll Never Be the Same, which was recorded live in a San Francisco club in 1995.
