= Ferritto =

Ferritto is a surname. Notable people with the surname include:

- John Ferritto (1937–2010), American composer, conductor, and music professor
- Ray Ferritto (1929–2004), Italian-American mobster
