= Stefan Pasborg =

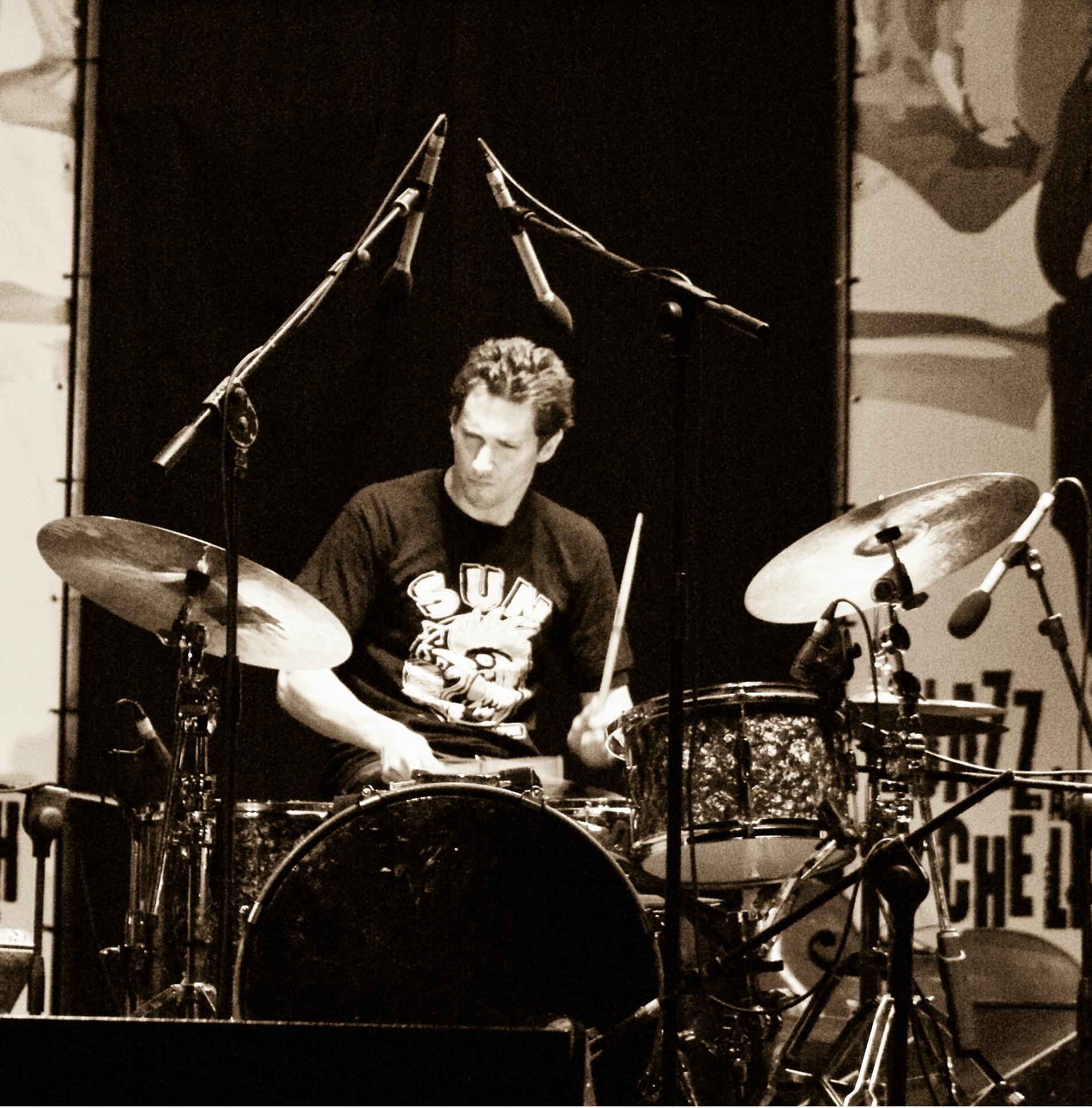

Background information
- Born: Stefan Pasborg; 6 December 1974 (age 51)
- Origin: Copenhagen, Denmark
- Genres: Improvised music, jazz, funk
- Occupations: Musician, composer
- Instruments: Drums, percussion
- Years active: 1996–present
- Website: www.pasborg.dk

Stefan Pasborg (born 6 December 1974) is a Danish drummer, composer, and bandleader, and the founding member of ILK MUSIC, a Danish record label.

== Biography ==
Pasborg began playing the drums the age of three when received a drum set as a gift from Alex Riel, a close friend of his parents who also became Pasborg's first drum teacher. In later years, while kept playing, he decided to attend the Copenhagen Jazz Conservatory where the teachers included Peter Danemo, Niels-Henning Ørsted Pedersen, Ed Thigpen, and Aage Tanggard. During his studies at the conservatory, he met other young musicians, and together they formed an independent record label called ILK Music.

In 2004, he was voted "New Name of The Year" at the Danish Music Award Jazz 2004 and his release Toxikum was voted "Jazz Discovery of the Year". Danish Music Awards Jazz is awarded annually by the International Federation of the Phonographic Industry. He received the 'Jazznytprisen' in 2013. In 2017, he received the prestigioues award Gudmanprisen (together with Alex Riel)

He has performed and recorded with many international recording artists such as John Tchicai, Miroslav Vitous, Ellery Eskelin, Tim Berne, Palle Danielsson, Marc Ducret, Anders Jormin, Michael Formanek, Tomasz Stanko, Carsten Dahl, Jesper Zeuthen, Ray Anderson, Alex Riel, Mikko Innanen, and Lotte Anker are among others. Pasborg has toured the most of Europe, US and Asia as a leader, also as a sideman. His debut-CD was named one of the "Best Debut Albums of 2007" All About Jazz-New York Best of 2007 New York

He has been in a relationship with Danish actress Marie Bach Hansen since 2017.

== Gallery ==
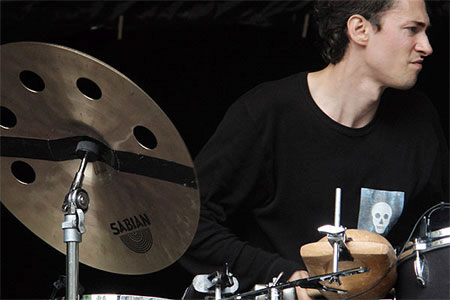

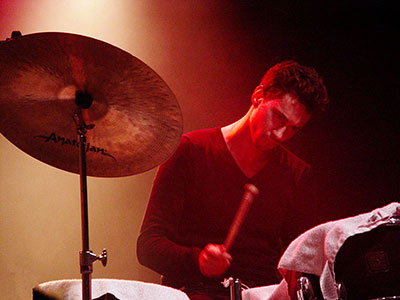

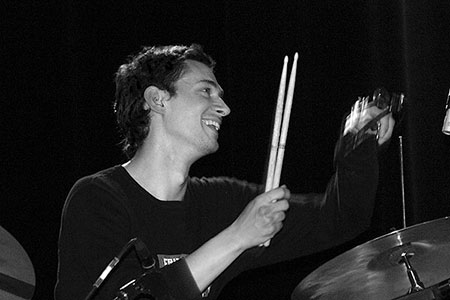

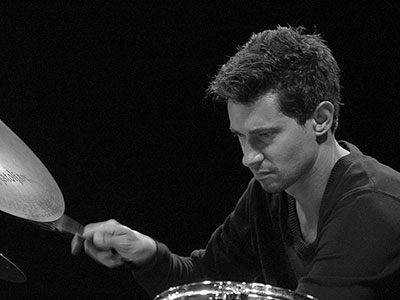

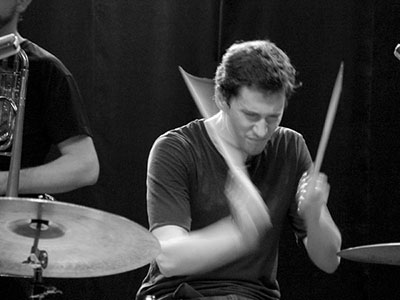

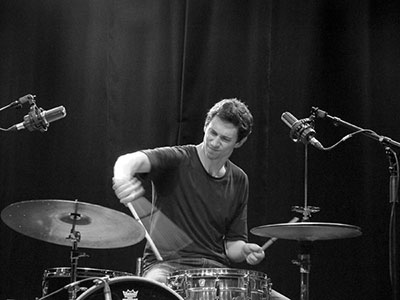

John Kelman of All About Jazz said in 2004 about Pasborg:

Percussionist Stefan Pasborg is a young Dane who has, in the past several years, studied with artists including Joey Baron, Jim Black and Daniel Humair—and given his experience, it is no surprise that his playing is daring, although it sometimes seems barely on the edge of sanity. But through it all he demonstrates a strong command of the kit; even at its most crazed this is no random bashing.

== Awards ==
- Danish Music Awards Jazz 2004 "New Name Of The Year". Award given by the International Federation of the Phonographic Industry (IFPI).
- Jazz Discovery of the Year 2004 for the album Toxikum. Award given by the IFPI.
- Danish Music Awards Jazz 2011 for Pasborg’s Odessa 5: X-tra Large (category: Best Danish Cross-over Jazz Release of the Year)

== Selected discography ==
=== As co-leader/collective ===
- DELIRIUM co-led with Finnish saxophonist Mikko Innanen (Fiasko Records – 2002 Finland)
- PASBORG & MOCKUNAS: “Toxikum” co-led with Lithuanian saxophonist Liudas Mockunas with a.o. Marc Ducret and John Tchicai (ILK Music – 2003 Denmark)
- IBRAHIM ELECTRIC by Ibrahim Electric, (ILK Music – 2004 Denmark)
- TRIOT with JOHN TCHICAI: “Sudden Happiness” (Tum Records – 2004 Finland)
- ICTUS – w/ Marc Ducret, Lotte Anker, Peter Friis-Nielsen: “Live” (ILK Music – 2005 Denmark)
- IBRAHIM ELECTRIC: “Meets Ray Anderson” by Ibrahim Electric featuring American trombonist Ray Anderson (Stunt Records – 2005 Denmark)
- FRA DE VARME LANDE: “Fra De Varme Lande” co-led with Danish guitarist Niclas Knudsen, Danish accordionist Anders Vesterdahl and Danish sousaphonist Jakob Munck (ILK Music – 2006 Denmark)
- IBRAHIM ELECTRIC: “Absinthe” by Ibrahim Electric (Stunt Records – 2006 Denmark)
- IBRAHIM ELECTRIC: “Meets Ray Anderson – again” by Ibrahim Electric featuring American trombonist Ray Anderson (Stunt Records – 2007 Denmark)
- STEFAN PASBORG: “Triplepoint” with among others Marc Ducret, John Tchicai, Ray Anderson and Ellery Eskelin (ILK Music – 2007 Denmark)
- PASBORG’s ODESSA 5 (Stunt Records – 2008 Denmark)
- PASBORG’s ODESSA 5: “X-tra Large” (Stunt Records – 2010 Denmark)
- PASBORG’s ODESSA 5: “X-tra Large – LIVE” (Stunt Records – 2012 Denmark)
- STEFAN PASBORG: “Free Moby Dick” (ILK Music – 2012 Denmark)
- ALEX RIEL / STEFAN PASBORG “Drumfaces” co-led with Alex Riel (Stunt Records – 2013 Denmark)
- STEFAN PASBORG / CARSTEN DAHL: “Live at SMK” with Carsten Dahl (ILK Music – 2014 Denmark)
- IBRAHIM ELECTRIC: “Rumours from Outer Space” by Ibrahim Electric (ILK Music – 2014 Denmark)
- STEFAN PASBORG: “The Firebirds” (ILK Music – 2015 Denmark)
- DAWDA JOBARTEH / STEFAN PASBORG: “Duo” (ILK Music – 2016 Denmark)
- IBRAHIM ELECTRIC: “The Marathon Concert” by Ibrahim Electric (Stunt Records – 2016 Denmark)
- ANIA RYBACKA & STEFAN PASBORG: “Voice’n’drums” (Hevhetia – 2018, Poland)
- STEFAN PASBORG: “Morricone” (limited-edition EP-vinyl, stixshop.net – 2018 Denmark)
- STEFAN PASBORG: “Love Me Tender” (limited-edition EP-vinyl, stixshop.net – 2018 Denmark)
- STEFAN PASBORG: “Solo” (limited-edition EP-vinyl, stixshop.net – 2018 Denmark)
- STEFAN PASBORG: “Man-the-Man” (limited-edition EP-vinyl, stixshop.net – 2018 Denmark)
- IBRAHIM ELECTRIC: “The Xmas Album” by Ibrahim Electric (limited-edition EP-vinyl, stixshop.net – 2018 Denmark)
- IBRAHIM ELECTRIC: “Time Machine” by Ibrahim Electric (Stunt Records – March 2020 Denmark)

=== As side man ===
- RENT ROMUS "Blood Motions" by Rent Romus' Life's Blood Trio (Jazzheads, 1998 USA)
- KOPPEL / VITOUS / KOPPEL / DAHL / PASBORG: "The Poetic Principle" with Koppel, Vitous, Koppel, and Dahl, (Cowbell Music - 2008 Denmark)
- JONAS MÜLLER: "East African Prayer Meeting Suite/Nordic Suite" (ILK Music - 2008 Denmark)
- RØD PLANET "RPM", with Liudas Mockunas and Jakob Riis (ILK Records - 2008 Denmark)
- VÉLO VÉLO by Jakob Davidsen and Peter Fuglsang, Gateway Records - 2008 Denmark)
- MARK O' LEARY "Grønland " by Mark O'Leary (Aucourant Records - 2009 USA)
- CARSTEN DAHL ‘EXPERIENCE’: “Humilitas” by Carsten Dahl (Storyville – 2010 Denmark)
- MARK O' LEARY: "Støj", by Mark O'Leary with Peter Friis-Nielsen (Ayler Records – 2011 France)
- WADADA LEO SMITH & TUMO: “Occupy the World” (TUM Records – 2012 Finland)
- SAMUEL HÄLLKVIST: “Variety of Loud” (BoogiePost Recordings / Plugged Music – 2012 Sweden)
- OTTO DONNER & TUMO: “And It Happened…” (TUM – 2013 Finland)
- CARSTEN DAHL ‘EXPERIENCE’: “Reveréntia” (Storyville – 2013 Denmark)
- SAMUEL HÄLLKVIST: “Variety of Live” w/ Guy Pratt, Pat Mastelotto a.o. (BoogiePost Recordings – 2015 Sweden)
- POLKADELIC BEBOP TRIO by Jonas Müller with Jonas Westergaard (limited-edition EP-vinyl, stixshop.net – 2018 Denmark)
- CARSTEN DAHL / TRINITY: “Painting Music” with Nils Bo Davidsen (ACT Music – 2019 Germany)
- MAJID BEKKAS: “Magic Spirit Quartet” with Goran Kajfes and Jesper Nordenström (ACT Music – 2020 Germany)
- CARSTEN DAHL / TRINITY: "Mirrors Within" with Nils Bo Davidsen (Storyville – 2020 Germany)
