= Henry Lewis (musician) =

American conductor

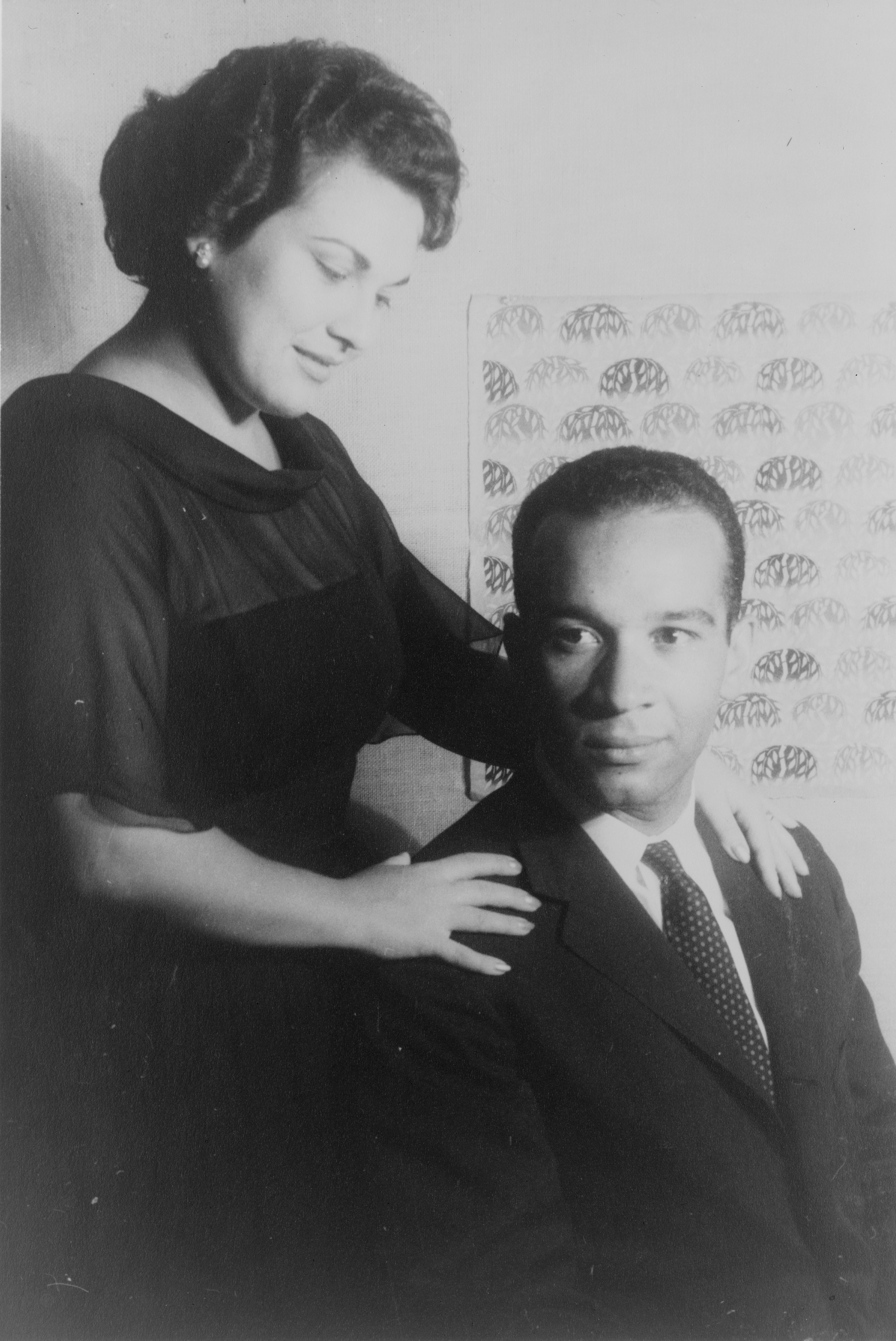
- Marilyn Horne and Henry Lewis in 1961, photo by Carl Van Vechten
- Born: October 16, 1932; Los Angeles, California, U.S.
- Died: January 26, 1996 (aged 63); New York City, U.S.
- Occupation: Conductor
- Years active: 1948–1991
- Known for: Directing and conducting: Seventh Army Symphony Orchestra; Los Angeles Philharmonic; New Jersey Symphony Orchestra
- Spouse: Marilyn Horne (m. 1960; div. 1979)
- Children: 1

External audio
- You may listen to Henry Lewis conducting the Seventh Army Symphony Orchestra performing the Concerto for Violin in D major Opus 35 by Pyotr Tchaikovsky in 1956 here on 7aso.org

Henry Jay Lewis (October 16, 1932 – January 26, 1996) was an American double-bassist and orchestral conductor whose career extended over four decades. A child prodigy, he joined the Los Angeles Philharmonic at age 16, becoming the first African-American instrumentalist in a major symphony orchestra and, later, the first African-American symphony orchestra conductor in the United States. As musical director of the Seventh Army Symphony Orchestra, he supported America's cultural diplomacy initiatives in Europe after World War II.

== Early life and education ==
Henry Jay Lewis was the only child of Henry J. Lewis, an automobile dealer and Mary Josephine Lewis, who was a nurse. Originally from Los Angeles, his musical education started early in life at the age of five. It included studies on the piano and subsequently the clarinet as well as various string instruments. His mother immediately recognized her son's natural musical gifts and encouraged him to perform with amateur orchestras while attending both parochial and public school. His father, however, was less enthusiastic, since professional opportunities did not exist for African-Americans in the field of classical music at that time. Undaunted, Lewis persevered and in Junior High School he undertook studies in both voice and the double bass, reasoning that his professional endeavors might be improved since double-bass players were rare. His virtuoso talents on the instrument earned him a scholarship, and Lewis subsequently attended the University of Southern California.

== Musical career ==
In 1948, at the age of 16, Lewis was invited to join the Los Angeles Philharmonic under the baton of Alfred Wallenstein, becoming the first African-American instrumentalist in a major symphony orchestra. After six years performing as a double-bassist with the Los Angeles Philharmonic, Lewis was abruptly drafted into the United States Army in 1954. In addition to continuing his performances on the double-bass, Lewis also conducted the Seventh Army Symphony Orchestra in Stuttgart, Germany and the Netherlands while serving in the United States Armed Forces (1955–1956). Under his musical direction, the orchestra concertized throughout Europe in support of America's cultural diplomacy initiatives during the post World War II era. His commanding officer noted that his imagination, artistic talent and devotion to his responsibilities as a conductor played an important role in enhancing European-American relations.

In 1957, Lewis completed his service in the United States Army and returned home to Los Angeles. In 1961, Lewis gained national recognition when he was appointed assistant conductor of the Los Angeles Philharmonic under Zubin Mehta, a post he held from 1961 to 1965. In the process, he became the first African-American conductor to lead a major orchestra on a regular season concert. His appearance as a substitute for the ailing Igor Markevitch in 1961 featured arias by Giuseppe Verdi as sung by his wife Marilyn Horne. The music critic Albert Golberg of the Los Angeles Times observed that Lewis exhibited a conductor's natural flair for command during the performance. In addition, Lewis' program was applauded for its musicality. In 1963 and 1964 he traveled with his orchestra in Western Europe and Yugoslavia under the auspices of the United States' Department of State's Cultural Presentations Program, as one of a select group of ensembles which represented American culture abroad as "cultural ambassadors". Lewis was also appointed as a member of the California Arts Commission in 1964.

Even during these early years in his career, Lewis' musical interests clearly extended beyond the traditional symphonic repertoire. As early as 1959, Lewis founded and directed the String Society of Los Angeles, an ensemble which specialized in the performance of chamber music. The ensemble collaborated frequently with teenage soloists from local schools in order to create opportunities for such young musicians. In 1969, he also served as a founding member of the Black Academy of Arts and Letters, a nonprofit which endeavored to promote and cultivate excellence in the African American performing arts. In addition, he was the founding conductor of the Young Musicians Foundation Training Orchestra. Under his direction, this nonprofit ensemble provided both scholarships and performance opportunities to aspiring young artists. After leading the orchestra for seven seasons, Lewis passed his baton to the composer and conductor Elmer Bernstein. During this period, he also demonstrated his interest in the vast operatic repertoire by serving as music director of the Los Angeles Opera.

External image
- Henry Lewis conducting the Royal Philharmonic Orchestra in London in 1968; Here on Getty Images

After his tenure at the Los Angeles Philharmonic was completed in 1965, Lewis acquired an international reputation as a talented young symphonic conductor. This enabled him to accept guest appearances with leading orchestral ensembles both in the United States as well as abroad. Appearances with the Chicago Symphony Orchestra and the London Symphony Orchestra were frequent during this period in the 1960s. In 1968 he was invited to conduct the Royal Philharmonic Orchestra at the Royal Festival Hall in London.

In 1968 Lewis became the conductor and musical director of the New Jersey Symphony Orchestra in Newark, and continued as musical director from 1968 until 1976. During this time, he transformed the group from a small community ensemble of largely part-time instrumentalists into a nationally recognized orchestra. Lewis vastly increased the orchestra's performance schedule from 22 concerts per year to 100 concerts per season and recruited several first tier soloists such as: Itzhak Perlman and Misha Dichter. Appearances by the orchestra at premier concert venues including Carnegie Hall and the Kennedy Center soon followed.

As the first African-American to lead a major symphony orchestra, Lewis also demonstrated a devotion to presenting music to the entire community by increasing the orchestra's outreach into New Jersey's ghettos and working class neighborhoods, where performances of classical music were virtually unknown. Always eager to surmount artificial boundaries between people Lewis soon scheduled concert appearances within neighborhoods which had largely been destroyed during the riots of 1968. Audiences were even invited into Symphony Hall in Newark for a modest one dollar admission charge. In order to attract even larger crowds, Lewis scheduled appearances by his wife Marilyn Horne as a bonus. Lewis was determined to shatter the myth that classical music is essentially an elitist art form and patiently scheduled performances at outdoor concert venues as well as local high school auditoriums throughout New Jersey. He was noted for his relaxed and informal style during concert appearances, and even encouraged his audiences to break into wild applause between movements if they were so inclined.

As an educator, Lewis joined forces with the Royal Philharmonic Orchestra to record an educational film for the benefit of high school and elementary students in 1970. By citing excerpts from the symphonic literature, Lewis strove to introduce students to the varied tonal qualities inherent within the instruments of the modern orchestral ensemble while also emphasizing the central role played by the string section.

Overcoming racial boundaries once again, Lewis emerged as the first African-American to conduct at the Metropolitan Opera in New York City in 1972. His Metropolitan Opera Orchestra debut in 1972 featured a performance of Puccini's La bohème with Anna Moffo in the role of Mimi and Richard Tucker as Rodolfo. It was well received by critics at The New York Times who declared that the Metropolitan Opera exercised good judgment by engaging him. He first appeared with the orchestra in 1965 while collaborating with the pianist Earl Wild in a George Gershwin Night outdoor concert at the landmark Lewisohn Stadium in Manhattan, New York. While conducting at The Met from 1972 to 1977 he collaborated with several leading operatic vocalists including: James McCracken as Don José in Bizet's Carmen (1973), Luciano Pavarotti as Rodolfo and Pilar Lorengar as Mimi in Puccini's La bohème (1973), Franco Corelli as Roméo and Adriana Maliponte as Juliette in Gounod's Roméo et Juliette (1974), Enrico Di Giuseppe as Lindoro in Rossini's L'italiana in Algeri (1974), Elinor Ross as Amelia and Luciano Pavarotti as Riccardo in a Gala Performance of Verdi's Un ballo in maschera (March 1975) and Renata Scotto as Berthe and James McCracken as Jean of Leyden in Meyerbeer's Le Prophéte (1977). Lewis also conducted the Metropolitan Opera Orchestra on its international concert tour to Japan in 1975.

After retiring from the New Jersey Symphony in 1976, Lewis toured as a guest conductor in all of the major opera houses and appeared as a guest conductor for such leading opera and symphonic ensembles as: the Chicago Symphony, the Cleveland Orchestra, the Boston Symphony, the Hamburg State Opera Orchestra, the Scottish Opera Orchestra, Rochester Philharmonic Orchestra, and the New York Philharmonic. Appearances in Milan, Paris, and Copenhagen were also common. These successful appearances led to his appointment in 1976 as musical director of the Opera-Musik Theatre Institute in New Jersey.

From 1989 to 1991, when Kees Bakels succeeded him, he was principal conductor of the Netherlands Radio Symphony in Hilversum. He continued to concertize in later years even as he struggled with complications from lung cancer.

During the course of his extensive musical career, Lewis mentored several students including Lawrence Foster.

== Recordings ==
External audio
- You may listen to Henry Lewis conducting the Royal Philharmonic Orchestra performing the Pastoral Symphony No. 6 In F Major, Op 68 by Ludwig van Beethoven in 1969 Here on Archive.org
- Henry Lewis conducting Marilyn Horne and the Vienna Cantata Orchestra in cantatas by Bach and Handel in 1969 Here on Archive.org

Henry Lewis' recordings illustrate his professional interest in a variety of diverse composers representing several different traditions in the history of classical music. In addition, they demonstrate his technical prowess for mastering a variety of divergent and technically challenging scores. In the symphonic repertoire, he recorded major works by Ludwig van Beethoven, Gustav Mahler, Richard Strauss and Pyotr Ilyich Tchaikovsky, illustrating his mastery of works by several of the masters from the Classical era into the Romantic period and beyond. These recordings include Richard Strauss' epic tone poem Also sprach Zarathustra. Yet it is also clear that he was quite comfortable conducting compositions from the dawn of the era of symphonic jazz, including George Gershwin's Piano Concerto in F and An American in Paris. He even ventured to complete a recording of the technically challenging Piano Concerto No. 2 in C Minor by Sergei Rachmaninoff with the American pianist Ivan Davis in 1971.

In the operatic repertoire, his interests included compositions by prominent French Romantic composers such as: Georges Bizet, Jules Massenet, as well as the nineteenth century German operatic composer Giacomo Meyerbeer. Yet he also collaborated with his wife Marilyn Horne in recordings of cantatas and songs by composers from the Baroque era including Johann Sebastian Bach and George Frideric Handel.

In the realm of popular contemporary music, he also recorded songs from the stage musical Carmen Jones featuring the music of Georges Bizet and lyrics by Oscar Hammerstein II.

Henry Lewis' musical legacy also includes several recordings from the operatic repertoire with his wife Marilyn Horne. Over the course of several decades starting in the 1960s he recorded over twenty albums for several leading international record labels including: Decca Records, London Records, RCA Red Seal, CBS Masterworks, Contour records, Red Label, RPO Records, EMI Records, Opera D'Oro and RelArt. His collaborators on these recordings include several of the world's leading international vocalists and pianists of his era including: Gabriel Bacquier, Boris Carmeli. Ryland Davies, Ivan Davis, Plácido Domingo, Nicolai Gedda, Alfredo Giacomotti, Robert El Hage, Sherrill Milnes, Fritz Peter, Leontyne Price, Margherita Rinaldi, Janis Vakarelis, and Nicola Zaccaria.

== Performance style ==
During the course of a professional musical career which ranged over four decades, Lewis earned critical acclaim from a variety of leading music critics. As early as 1961, Albert Golberg of The Los Angeles Times noted that Lewis possessed a conductor's natural flair for commanding his orchestra. Donal Henahan of The New York Times noted in 1972 that Lewis' debut with the Metropolitan Orchestra was highly successful and that Lewis possessed a complete understanding of Puccini's broad musical lyricism. Harold C. Schonberg of The New York Times observed that his insightful interpretation of Rossini's Siege of Corinth with Marilyn Horne at Carnegie Hall moved the audience to pandemonium. This was immediately followed by a surge of ovations which brought the concert to a standstill for nearly five minutes.

== Awards and honors ==
For his outstanding contributions to music, Henry J. Lewis was inducted into the American Classical Music Hall of Fame in 2015. His recording with Leontyne Price for RCA Red Seal (ARL1-3522, 1980) of "Great Soprano Arias from Handel and Britten" was awarded the Grammy Award in 1981 in the category of Best Classical Vocal Soloist Performance.

Lewis was also the recipient of several honorary degrees from Saint Peter's University (1972), Rutgers University (1969) and Rider University (1969).

== Personal life ==
From 1960 to 1979, Lewis was married to opera singer Marilyn Horne, who often credits him with her early development as a singer. They had a daughter, Angela.

Lewis died from a heart attack in 1996 at the age of 63 at his New York City apartment.

== Discography ==
Henry Lewis' discography includes several recordings in which he collaborates with his wife, Marilyn Horne. Included among them are recordings of: Le prophète by Giacomo Meyerbeer (CBS, 1976) featuring James McCracken (as Jean of Leyden), Renata Scotto (as Berthe) and Horne in the role of Fides. It was also recorded live with Nicolai Gedda and Margherita Rinaldi in Turin (1970). Additional recordings featuring Marilyn Horne include: Souvenirs of a Golden Era (Decca Records, 1966) and Marilyn Horne Recital (Decca Records, 1964).

Included within Henry J. Lewis' discography are the following recordings:

- Marilyn Horne – Decca Records (LXT 6149) Marilyn Horne in recital with Henry J. Lewis conducting the Orchestra of the Royal Opera House Covent Garden (1965)
- Marilyn Horne, Henry Lewis – Arias from French Operas – Decca Records (SXL 6345) Henry J. Lewis conducting the Vienna Opera Orchestra (1968)
- Tchaikovsky Symphony No. 6 in B Minor – Decca Records (SPC-21034) Henry J. Lewis conducting the Royal Philharmonic Orchestra (1969)
- Marilyn Horne – Decca Records (SXL 6349) Marilyn Horne sings selections from Bach and Handel with Henry J. Lewis conducting the Vienna Cantata orchestra (!969)
- Beethoven Symphony No. 6 ("Pastoral") in F Major Op. 68 – London Records (SPC 21039) Henry J. Lewis conducting the Royal Philharmonic Orchestra (1969)
- Richard Strauss – Also Sprach Zarathustra – Decca Records (SAD 22105) Henry J. Lewis conducting the Royal Philharmonic Orchestra (1970)
- Tchaikovsky Piano Concerto No. 1 in B Flat Minor – Decca Records (SPC 21056) Ivan Davis soloist with Henry J. Lewis conducting the Royal Philharmonic Orchestra (1970)
- Mahler Kindertotenlieder & Wagner Wesendonck Lieder – Decca Records (SXL 6446) Marilyn Horne soloist with Henry J. Lewis conducting the Royal Philharmonic Orchestra (1970)
- Marilyn Horne Sings Carmen – London records (SPC 21055) Marilyn Horne soloist with Henry J. Lewis conducting the Royal Philharmonic Orchestra and Chorus (1971)
- Richard Strauss – Don Juan & Till Eulenspiegel's Merry Pranks – London Records (21054) Henry L. Lewis conducting the Royal Philharmonic Orchestra (1971)
- Rachmaninoff Piano Concerto No. 2 in C Minor – Decca Records (PFS 4214) Ivan Davis soloist with Henry J. Lewis conducting the Royal Philharmonic Orchestra (1971)
- Marilyn Horne Sings Rossini – London Records (OS 26305) Marilyn Horne soloist with Henry L. Lewis conducting the Royal Philharmonic Orchestra (1973)
- Massenet – La Navarraise – RCA Red Seal (ARL1-1114) Vocalists: Marilyn Horne, Placido Domingo, Sherrill Milnes with Henry J. Lewis conducting the London Symphony Orchestra (1975)
- Meyerbeer – Le Prophet – CBS Materworks (79400) – Vocalists: Marilyn Horne, James McCracken, Renata Scotto, Jerome Hines with Henry J. Lewis conducting the Royal Philharmonic (1976)
- Leontyne Price – Prima Donna Vol. 5 Great Soprano Arias from Handel and Britten – RCA Red Seal (ARL1-3522) Leontyne Price with Henry L. Lewis conducting the Philharmonia Orchestra (1980)
- Tchaikovsky Piano Concerto No.1 /Rachmaninoff – Rhapsody on a Theme by Paganini – Contour Red Label (CC 7594) Ivan Davis, Ilana Vered, soloists with Henry J. Lewis conducting the Royal Philharmonic Orchestra (1983)
- Gershwin Piano Concerto No. 1 In F, An American in Paris – MCA Classics (MCA 6229) Janis Vakarelis soloist with Henry J. Lewis conducting the Royal Philharmonic Orchestra (1988)
- Oscar Hammersteins' Carmen Jones – EMI Angel Studio (4DS 54352) Henry J. Lewis conducting (1991)

== Filmography ==
- The Symphony Sound with Henry Lewis and the Royal Philharmonic – Educational film by Henry Lewis featuring the Royal Philharmonic Orchestra released by I.Q. Films Learning Corp. of America (1970)

== See also ==
- Black conductors
