= Hugo Chaim Adler =

Belgian composer

Hugo Chaim Adler (17 January 1894 – 24 December 1955), was a Belgian cantor, composer, and choir conductor. He is primarily recognized for creating and popularizing contemporary versions of 19th-century Jewish cantorial music. He is the father of Samuel Adler, a prominent American composer of contemporary classical music.

== Personal life ==
Hugo Chaim Adler was born in Antwerp, Belgium, while his Jewish-German parents were on holiday on January 17, 1894. He was one of eight sons born to his parents, Emma Dahl and Simon Adler.

Raised in Mannheim, Baden-Württemberg, Germany, he studied music composition at the Hochschule für Musik Köln from 1912-1915 and played piano. In 1915 he was drafted into the German Army as an infantryman and was injured at the Argonne in 1918. All seven of his brothers served in the war, and all survived. After returning home, Adler began his tenure at the Haupt-Synagogue in Mannheim and met his wife Selma Rothschild. They had two children, Marianne and Samuel Adler. He participated in the Mannheim Holiday Choir and was a member of the local Liederkranz.

On Kristallnacht in 1938, the Haupt-Synagogue and Adler's final German cantata “Akedah” were destroyed in the firebombing. That December, he was imprisoned for two months in The Netherlands due to his Jewish ancestry. Upon his release in the spring of 1939, the family emigrated to New York City and settled in Worcester, Massachusetts, up to and including his American citizenship being approved in 1946. Adler worked as a cantor, conductor and music educator in Worcester until he was diagnosed with cancer and died in December 1955.

== Educational and Professional Career ==
External audio
- You may hear excerpts from the liturgical compositions of Hugo Chaim Adler conducted by Samuel Adler in 1998; Here on Milken Archive

Adler studied music composition and Jewish teacher training at the Hochschule für Musik Köln from 1912-1915, and studied music composition with Ernst Toch at the Mannheim Conservatory from 1924-1926. After a brief tenure as cantor in the town of St. Wendel in the Saarlands from 1918-1921, Adler became chief cantor at the Haupt-Synagogue in Mannheim, Germany from 1921-1938. He taught educational courses and lectured other local Jewish educators and composers during this time, as well as his cantorial duties. For his efforts, he was awarded in 1937 by the Reichs Jewish Cultural Association for his work with mixed a capella music.

After emigrating to the United States, he became the head cantor of Temple Emanuel in Worcester, Massachusetts in March 1939. He helped organize the Worcester Annual Jewish Music Festival from 1940-1954. Adler sat on the New York Hebrew Union College and School of Sacred Music's advisory boards, and worked for the Zionist Organization of America. In 1942, he was awarded the first prize by the Central Conference of American Rabbis for his liturgical work. His works were published by Transcontinental Music Publishers and Sacred Music Press, two of the largest Jewish-American music publishers. Adler's music is still taught and performed in American and Israeli synagogues, primarily the Shabbat prayers “Nachalath Israel,” “Kaddish,” and his cantatas “Jonah” and “Bearers of Light.”
