= Seventh Army Symphony Orchestra =

United States Army orchestra

- Seventh Army shoulder sleeve insignia
- Founded: 1952
- Disbanded: 1962
- Location: Stuttgart, West Germany
- Website: 7aso.org/htmldocs/asaudiop.html

The Seventh Army Symphony Orchestra was the only symphonic orchestral ensemble ever created under the supervision of the United States Army. Founded by the composer Samuel Adler, its members participated in the cultural diplomacy initiatives of the United States in an effort to demonstrate the shared cultural heritage of the United States, its European allies and the vanquished countries of Europe during the post World War II era.

== History ==
The Seventh Army Symphony Orchestra was established as part of the Seventh United States Army based in Stuttgart, Germany in 1952. It was founded by the young conductor Samuel Adler who also served as its first principal conductor while stationed as a corporal in the 2nd Armored Division during the Cold War. The orchestra's membership consisted of professionally educated musicians who were also enlisted within the Army during the 1950s and early 1960s.

External image
- The Seventh Army Symphony Orchestra conducted by its founder Samuel Adler in Kassel, Germany(1952); Here on bruceduffie.com

During the course of a decade, the orchestra concertized extensively throughout the ruins of war-torn Europe as part of the cultural diplomacy initiatives of the United States in the aftermath of World War II. In addition to bolstering the morale of America's enlisted troops, the orchestra was established in order to demonstrate the shared cultural values and musical heritage which united the citizens of America with their counterparts throughout Europe. The orchestra's performances were well received by audiences and included tours within West Germany, Denmark, France, Greece, Italy and the United Kingdom from 1952 until 1962.

Under Samuel Adler's musical direction, the orchestra incorporated a repertoire consisting of selections from the major symphonic repertoire of classical music including works by Ludwig van Beethoven and Johannes Brahms. In later years, it also sought to share America's musical heritage with European audiences by showcasing the talents of leading American composers including: Roy Harris, Leroy Anderson and Morton Gould. These concerts proved to be quite popular among civilians and military personnel alike. General Dwight D. Eisenhower even praised the orchestra as the "greatest thing for American-German relations" since the end of World War II. While serving as the United States high commissioner to Germany on the Allied High Commission, James B. Conant also praised the orchestra for promoting cultural understanding between the German and American people. According to Conant, "This group of young Army musicians has done more than any other single military unit in Germany to promote a better cultural understanding between the American and German peoples." Adler received a special Citation of Excellence from the Army for forming the 7th Army Symphony Orchestra and its success in Europe between 1952 and 1961.

Over the years, members of the orchestra participated in several historic performances. During the orchestra's inaugural concert on July 5, 1952, in Heidelberg, members of the orchestra performed during the farewell festivities for NATO's Supreme Allied Commander General Dwight D. Eisenhower. In December 1955 they served as the first American orchestra to participate in a live radio broadcast on German radio conducted by Ronald Ondrejka. Several years later in 1957, they debuted on the German television network in Berlin under the direction of Ling Tung and participated in the program "Week of Light Music" which was broadcast on South German Radio to Europe and the United States. In 1958, the orchestra also concertized at the Brussels World's Fair under the direction of Edward Lee Alley.

As the reconstruction of Europe advanced during the 1950s, performances by the orchestra were no longer deemed to be necessary. Recruitment within the Army for the orchestra was curtailed after 1962.

== Radio broadcasts ==
In addition to providing concerts for audiences throughout Europe, the Seventh Army Orchestra also concertized over the radio. Performances by the orchestra were shared with all members of the United States armed forces over the Armed Forces Radio Service.

== Conductors ==
Over the years, various noted musicians conducted the Seventh Army Orchestra including:

- 1952–1953 Samuel Adler
- 1953–1954 James Dixon, Andrew Heath
- 1953–1955 Kenneth Schermerhorn
- 1954–1956 Ronald Ondrejka
- 1955–1956 Henry Lewis
- 1956–1958 Ling Tung
- 1957–1959 Nico Snel
- 1958–1960 Edward Lee Alley, Howard Wassermann – Assistant Conductor
- 1959–1960 John Ferritto, John Canarina
- 1960–1961 Arthur Shettle, Ralph Lane
- 1960–1962 Reid Bunger
- 1961–1962 Thomas Lewis, John Covelli

== Notable members ==
- Samuel Adler, conductor
- Bob McGrath
- Jim Hughart
- Ben Patterson, double bassist
- Doug Sax, trumpet
- Don Ellis, trumpet
