= Ibrahim Electric =

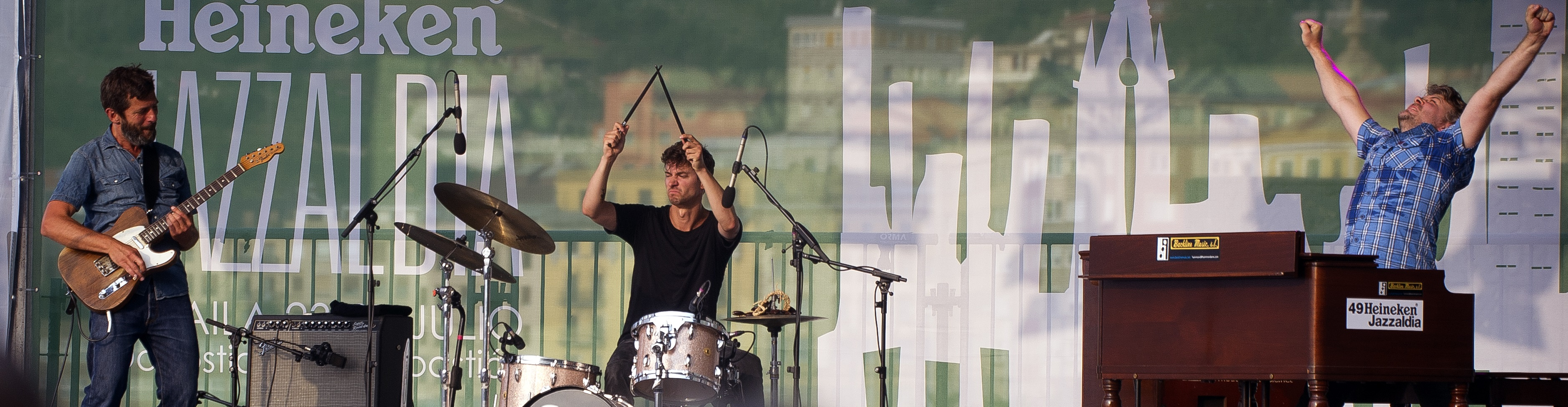
Ibrahim Electric performing in 2014

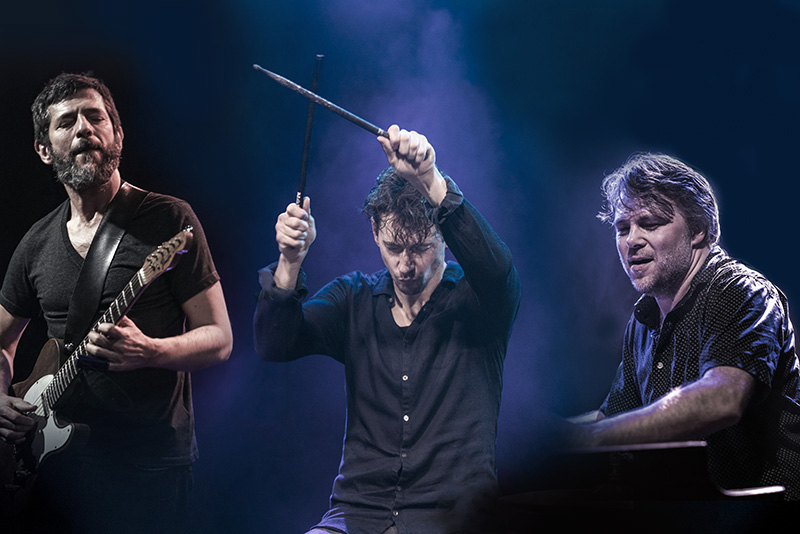
Ibrahim Electric, 2017

Ibrahim Electric is a Danish band situated primarily in Copenhagen, Denmark. Ibrahim "Jævnstrøm" Electric are widely famous in Denmark for their experimental music, many genres, including jazz, funk, afro-beat, surf and many more. The band members are Niclas Knudsen (guitar), Stefan Pasborg (drums) and Jeppe Tuxen (Hammond B-3) In 2005 they recorded a live CD with trombonist Ray Anderson at Copenhagen Jazzhouse, called Ibrahim Electric Meets Ray Anderson. They repeated this in 2007 with the CD Ibrahim Electric Meets Ray Anderson - Again!.

In 2006, they released the album Absinthe: Ian Patterson for All About Jazz found that this record avoided the tendency of groove-based music to sound repetitive, while Gaffa gave the album 4/6, calling Ibrahim Electric "one of the most interesting and elusive bands" in Denmark.

== Discography ==
- 2004: Ibrahim Electric (ILK Music)
- 2005: Ibrahim Electric Meets Ray Anderson (Stunt Records)
- 2006: Absinthe (Stunt Records)
- 2007: Ibrahim Electric Meets Ray Anderson - Again (Stunt Records)
- 2008: Brothers of Utopia (Tactic Records)
- 2010: Royal Air Maroc ' (Tactic Records)
- 2012: Isle of Men (Target Records)
- 2014: Rumours from Outer Space (ILK Music)
- 2017: The Marathon Concert (Stunt Records)
- 2020: Time Machine (Stunt Records/Sundance Music)
- 2023: Greatness

== Gallery ==
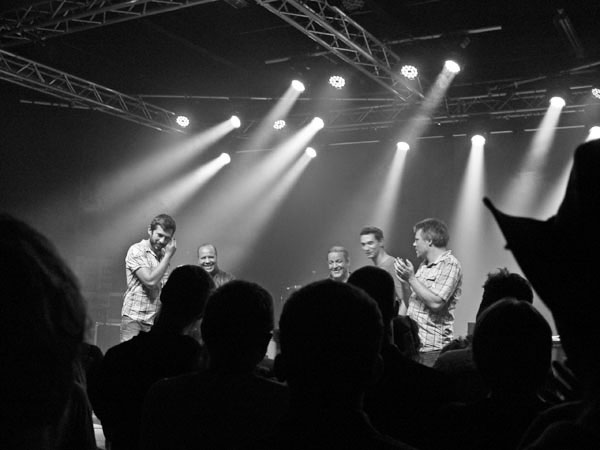
Ibrahim Electric 2011
