= Michael Sidney Timpson =

American composer (born 1970)

- Born: February 26, 1970 (age 56); Mountain View, California, United States
- Education: University of Southern California (BM); Eastman School of Music (MA); University of Michigan (DMA)
- Occupations: Composer, Professor
- Notable work: Chasin' Bill, CRUSH

Michael Sidney Timpson (born February 26, 1970) is an American composer of contemporary classical music. He is a Professor of Music Composition at Ewha Womans University in Seoul, South Korea.

== Early life and education ==
Timpson was born and raised in Mountain View, California, in Silicon Valley. His early musical training included playing baritone saxophone and bass clarinet. He was a co-founder of the jazz group Jazz on the Line with saxophonists Rent Romus and Dan Magay, developing an interest in American improvisational forms including cool jazz, bebop, free jazz, and jazz fusion.

Timpson earned his Bachelor of Music (BM) in composition from the University of Southern California, where he studied with Morten Lauridsen. He received his Master of Arts (MA) from the Eastman School of Music, studying under Joseph Schwantner. He completed his Doctor of Musical Arts (DMA) at the University of Michigan, where his teachers included Samuel Adler, William Albright, and William Bolcom.

== Career ==
=== Academic positions ===
Timpson has held faculty positions at several American universities, including the University of Kansas, Rhodes College in Memphis, Tennessee, and the University of South Florida, where he taught music composition and electronic music.

In 2009, he was awarded a Senior Fulbright Research Scholarship in the Humanities to conduct research in Taipei, Taiwan, focusing on orchestration for Chinese instruments. Following this research period, he moved to Seoul, South Korea in August 2010, where he joined the faculty of Ewha Womans University as a Professor of Music Composition.

=== Compositional style and works ===
Timpson's compositional style combines elements from European contemporary classical music, American jazz and popular music traditions, and Asian traditional music. His works are written for various media including orchestral, chamber, band, percussion, electronic, vocal, and traditional Asian instruments.

As part of his research on Asian music, Timpson performs on various Chinese wind instruments, including suona, guanzi, dizi, xiao, xun, bawu, hulusi, and sheng, as well as related instruments from other Asian regions.

Among his frequently performed compositions are Chasin' Bill for Chinese silk and bamboo ensemble and CRUSH for soprano saxophone and Chinese guzheng.

== Awards and honors ==
Timpson has received recognition through various composition awards and competitions:

- ASCAP Grant for Young Composers
- BMI Student Composers Award
- DownBeat Magazine Award for Extended Composition
- Brian M. Israel Prize (The Society for New Music and the New York Federation of Music Clubs)
- Lee Ettelson Composer's Award
- National Federation of Music Clubs Youse Competition (first place)
- Music From China International Competition (second place)
- NACUSA (National Association of Composers of The United States of America) Composition Competition (second place)
- Kathryn Thomas Flute Competition, England (highly commended)
- National Federation of Music Clubs Beyer Competition (honorable mention)

He was twice nominated for the American Academy of Arts and Letters composition award.

== Performances and recordings ==
Timpson's works have been performed by various ensembles including The Florida Orchestra, Jacksonville Symphony Orchestra, and the Kyiv Philharmonic. His compositions have been premiered at Carnegie Hall, Merkin Hall in New York, and Taiwan National Concert Hall.

His orchestral works have been recorded by the Kyiv Philharmonic (three works) and the Chinese National Film Orchestra (one work). His compositions have been released on Albany Records/Capstone, CRS, NACUSA, and ERM recording labels.

His music is published by HoneyRock Music, American Composers Editions, and World-Wide Music. His works have been broadcast on radio programs throughout the United States, Asia, and Europe.
