= James Dixon (conductor) =

American orchestra conductor

James Dixon (April 26, 1928 – April 3, 2007) was an orchestra conductor and music educator in the United States. During his career he was principally associated with the University of Iowa and the Quad City Symphony Orchestra.

== Early life ==
James Allen Dixon was born in Estherville, Iowa and raised and educated in Guthrie Center, Iowa. He started working at the age of 11 as a shoe shine boy at a barber shop. He went on to work in a bakery, followed by a year serving as the part owner of a small farm. He conducted his first orchestra on May 8, 1945 in Guthrie Center - the day Germany surrendered, ending World War II in Europe. The orchestra's conductor was out of town and Dixon volunteered to direct the impromptu concert. Dixon studied conducting at the University of Iowa where he earned a bachelor's degree in 1952 and a master's degree in 1956. Between his undergraduate and graduate education, he served in the United States Army, where he conducted the Seventh Army Symphony Orchestra in Germany. He studied for nine years under his mentor, the distinguished Greek conductor, pianist, and composer Dimitris Mitropoulos. Mitropoulos made Dixon his heir and left him his scores.

== Career ==
Dixon first conducted the University of Iowa Symphony when he was a graduate student. After he received his master's degree he taught at the New England Conservatory. He conducted NEC's orchestra for 20 concerts during the 1959-1960 and the 1960-1961 seasons. Dixon then served as the assistant conductor of the Minnesota Orchestra for a year before returning to the University of Iowa in 1962. He taught conducting and was the conductor of the University of Iowa Symphony. Dixon commissioned a symphony from Anthony Burgess, which was completed without payment. Burgess' Symphony No. 3 in C premiered in Iowa City on October 22, 1975. The symphony became the first public performance of the orchestral work of Burgess, and it significantly increased his composing activity. During Dixon's tenure at Iowa, the International Society for Contemporary Music met for the first time in the United States (in 1976). The University of Iowa Symphony was one of three American orchestras chosen to perform an extensive program of new works.

In 1965 James Dixon replaced Charles Gigante as the music director and conductor of the Tri-City Symphony Orchestra in Davenport, Iowa. It was renamed the Quad City Symphony while he was its music director. During his 29-year tenure with the orchestra he was credited with building the QCSO into “an ensemble of musical distinction that is respected for the innovation of its programming and artistic integrity.” He also expanded the number of modern works into the orchestra's repertoire.

== Later life and death ==
Dixon retired from the Quad City Symphony in 1994. Three years later, he retired as the Philip Greeley Clapp/Carver Distinguished Professor of Music at the University of Iowa. During his career he served as a mentor to more than 30 conducting students and conducted the world premieres of approximately 40 new works. Dixon led the Quad City Symphony for the last time in 2000. He died in Iowa City, Iowa at the age of 77 from complications from pneumonia and influenza.

== Recognition ==
- Elizabeth Sprague Coolidge Medal, 1955
- Mahler Medal of Honor, The Bruckner Society of America, 1962
- Laurel Leaf Award, 1978
- Ditson Conductor's Award, 1980
- UIAA Distinguished Faculty/Staff Award, 2005
- Honorary Doctorates:
  - Augustana College
  - St. Ambrose University

== Partial discography ==
James Dixon conducted the orchestra on the following recordings:

- New music from the University of Iowa (University of Iowa, 1983)
- Antiphony IX (Music & Arts, 1994)
- Wuorinen: Music of Two Decades, Vol. 2 (Music & Arts, 1994)
- Music of Charles Wuorinen: Two-Part Symphony / Chamber Concerto for Flute & Ten Players / Chamber Concerto for Tuba / Piano Concerto (Composers Recordings, 1997)
- Quad City Symphony Orchestra (Disc Makers, 2001)
