= Samuel Adler (composer) =

American composer and conductor

- Born: Samuel Hans Adler; 4 March 1928 (age 98); Mannheim, Germany
- Citizenship: American
- Education: Boston University (BM); Harvard University (MA)
- Occupations: Composer, conductor, author, and professor
- Years active: 1952–2016
- Known for: Founder of the Seventh Army Symphony Orchestra
- Spouses: Carol Starker (m. 1960; div. 1989) Emily Freeman Brown (m. 1991)
- Children: 2
- Awards: American Academy of Arts and Letters; Cross of Merit (Germany)
- Military career
- Allegiance: United States
- Branch: United States Army
- Service years: 1950–1952
- Rank: Corporal
- Unit: 2nd Armored Division
- Website: samuelhadler.com

Samuel Hans Adler (born March 4, 1928) is a German-American composer, conductor, author, and professor. During the course of a professional career which ranges over six decades he has served as a faculty member at both the University of Rochester's Eastman School of Music and the Juilliard School. In addition, he is credited with founding and conducting the Seventh Army Symphony Orchestra which participated in the cultural diplomacy initiatives of the United States in Germany and throughout Europe in the aftermath of World War II. Adler's musical catalogue includes over 400 published compositions. He has been honored with several awards, including Germany's Order of Merit – Officer's Cross.

== Biography ==
Adler was born to a Jewish family in Mannheim, Germany, the son of Hugo Chaim Adler, a cantor and composer, and Selma Adler who was an amateur pianist. At the age of ten, Samuel was separated from his father while Hugo was imprisoned in the Netherlands following the Kristallnacht pogrom of 1938. After Hugo's return to Mannheim, the family was reunited and subsequently fled the Nazi regime in Germany through the Netherlands to the United States in 1939, where Hugo became the cantor of Temple Emanuel in Worcester, Massachusetts. Sam soon followed his father into the music profession and began his musical studies on the violin with Albert Levy. His formal education in composition was initiated under Herbert Fromm in 1941. Subsequently, Adler earned degrees from both Boston University (where he studied musicology with Karl Geiringer) and Harvard University (where he studied with Aaron Copland, Irving Fine, Paul Hindemith, Paul Pisk, Walter Piston, and Randall Thompson and earned an M.A. in 1950). He studied conducting with Serge Koussevitzky at the Berkshire Music Center at Tanglewood in 1949. Adler has been awarded four honorary doctorates from Southern Methodist and Wake Forest Universities, St. Mary's College of Notre Dame and the St. Louis Conservatory of Music.

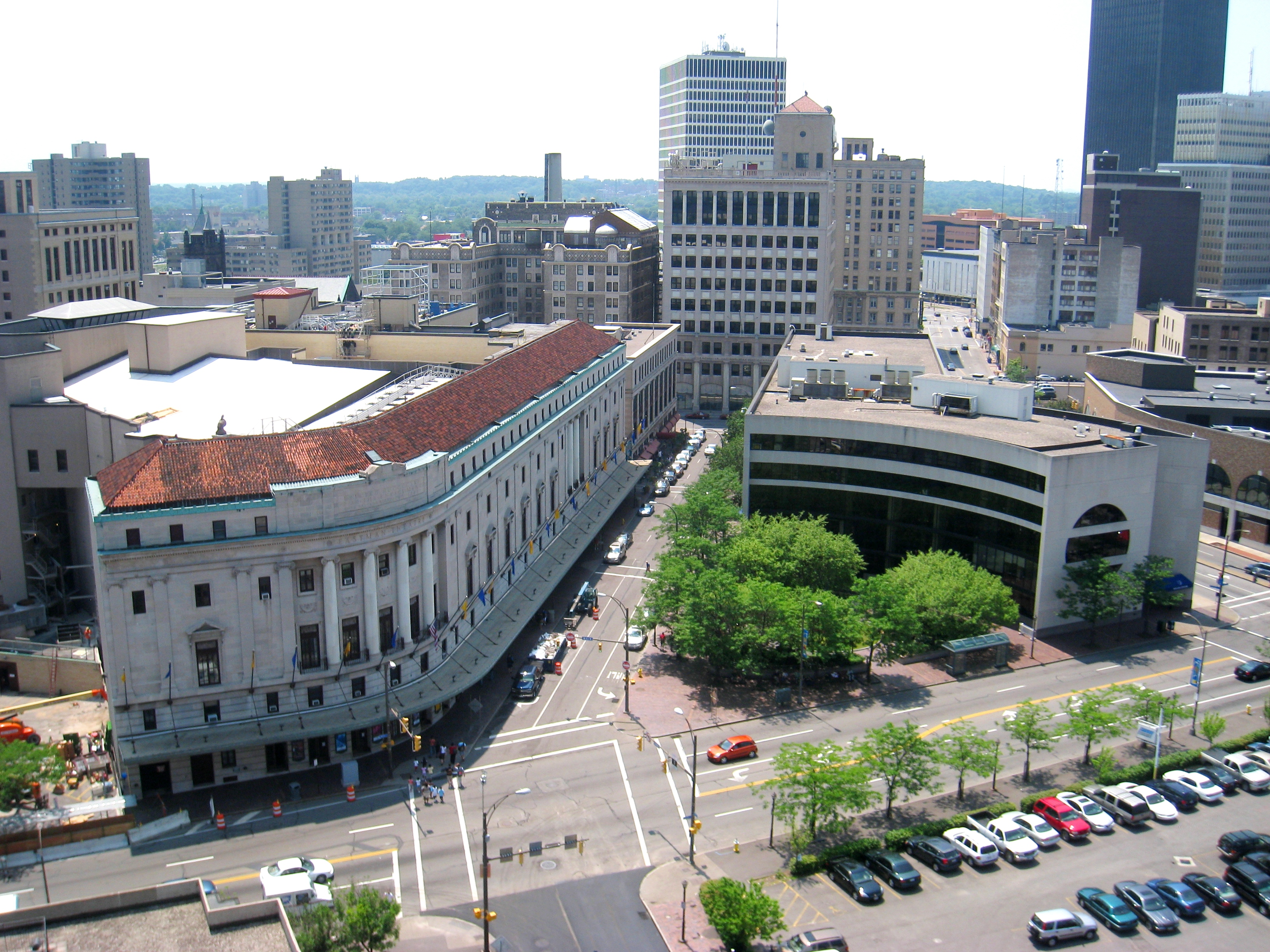
Eastman School of Music, University of Rochester

After completing his academic studies in 1950, Adler served as a corporal in the 2d Armored Division. During this time he founded the Seventh Army Symphony Orchestra (1952) in Stuttgart, Germany, which served to demonstrate the shared cultural heritage of America and Europe in the post World War II era through cultural diplomacy. For this, he received a special Citation of Excellence from the Army for the orchestra's success between 1952 and 1961. Subsequently, he accepted a position as music director at Temple Emanu-El in Dallas, Texas, beginning his tenure there in 1953. At the Dallas temple during his 1953 to 1966 tenure, he formed four children's choirs, and an adult volunteer choir with ninety members. From 1954 to 1958, Adler conducted the Dallas Lyric Theater. From 1957 to 1966, he served as professor of Composition at the University of North Texas College of Music. Between 1966 and 1995, Adler served as professor of composition at the University of Rochester's Eastman School of Music. In addition, he served as chairman of the Department of Music at the Eastman School of Music from 1973 to 1994. Since 1997, Adler has been a member of the composition faculty at Juilliard and, for the 2009–10 year, was awarded the William Schuman Scholars Chair.

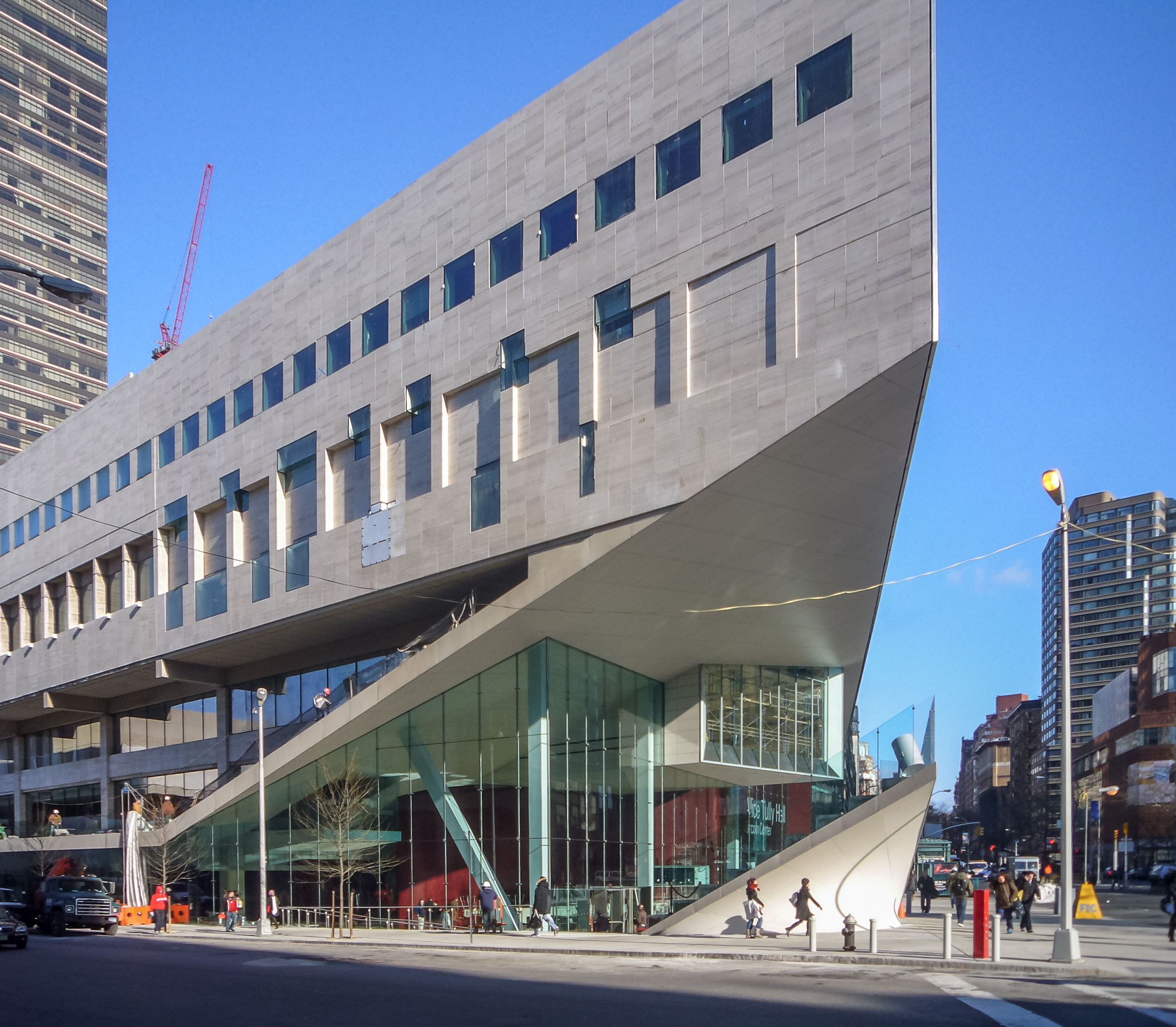
Juilliard School – Alice Tully Hall

He is also the author of three books, Choral Conducting (Holt Rinehart and Winston 1971, second edition Schirmer Books 1985), Sight Singing (W.W. Norton 1979, 1997), and The Study of Orchestration (W.W. Norton 1982, 1989, 2001, 2016; Italian edition edited by Lorenzo Ferrero for EDT Srl Torino, 2008). He has also contributed numerous articles to major magazines, books and encyclopedias published in the U.S. and abroad. Adler also reflected upon six decades of teaching in his memoirs Building Bridges with Music: Stories from a Composer's Life which was published by Pendragon Press in 2017.

Over the decades Adler's musical legacy has been interpreted by several orchestral ensembles including: the Cleveland Chamber Symphony, Esterhazy Quartet, the Latvian National Symphony Orchestra, Brandenburgisches Staatsorchester Frankfurt, and the Bowling Green Philharmonia. In more recent times his works have also been showcased by leading orchestras around the world, including: the Berlin Radio Symphony Orchestra, the Los Angeles Philharmonic, the Mannheim National Theatre Orchestra, and the St. Louis Symphony. Performances of his compositions have been recorded on several record labels including: Albany Records, Linn Records, Navona Records, and Naxos Records.

Adler is married to Emily Freeman Brown, who is currently serving as music director and conductor of the Bowling Green Philharmonia.

== Compositional style ==
External audio
- You may hear Samuel Adler's "A Song of Hanukkah" Here on archive.org
- You may hear Samuel Adler's "Fourth String Quartet" performed by the Pro Arte Quartet; Here on archive.org
- You may hear Adler conducting excerpts from the liturgical compositions of Hugo Chaim Adler in 1998; Here on Milken Archive

Musicologists have noted that Adler's works incorporate a wide range of compositional techniques including: free atonality, diatonicism, and serialism. In addition, he is recognized for interweaving dance rhythms, folk themes, ostinati, and devices associated with aleatoric music throughout his scores. Adler does not advocate serialism or atonality.

It has also been observed that Adler's compositions illustrate a "midstream modernism", which is characterized by interwoven contrapunctal musical lines which form the foundation for a tonal harmonic complex punctuated by tangential atonal episodes. In addition, his music is said to be inspired by the liturgical cantilena featured in the Jewish musical tradition as well as oriental inflections.

In the course of describing his own compositional style, Adler emphasized the belief that contemporary music does not place sufficient emphasis on the aesthetic and communicative impact of musical composition while exaggerating the technical aspect instead. Simply stated, Adler observes that, "I feel that my works require a modified serial technique, but it is a very unorthodox one, and almost never strictly adhered to throughout a given work. Neither does it destroy all tonal feeling".

== Awards ==
Adler has been awarded many prizes, including a membership into the American Academy in Berlin (2004) and Institute of Arts and Letters awarded in May 2001, the Charles Ives Award (1961), and the Lillian Fairchild Award (1974). In May 2003, he was presented with the Aaron Copland Award by ASCAP for Lifetime Achievement in Music (Composition and Teaching). In 2008, he was inducted into the American Classical Music Hall of Fame. Similarly, in 2001 Adler was honored with a lifetime appointment to the American Academy of Arts and Letters. In 1999, he was elected to the Academy of Arts, Berlin for distinguished service to music. In 1983, he won the Deems Taylor Award for his book on orchestration; in 1984, he was appointed Honorary Professorial Fellow of the University College in Cardiff, Wales, and was awarded a Guggenheim Fellowship for 1984–85. He has been a MacDowell Fellow for five years between 1954 and 1963. In 1986, he received the "Distinguished Alumni Award" from Boston University.

The Music Teachers' National Association selected Adler as its "Composer of the Year 1986–87" for Quintalogues, which won the national competition. In the 1988–89 year, he has been designated "Phi Beta Kappa Visiting Scholar". In 1989, he was awarded The Eastman School's Eisenhart Award for distinguished teaching, and he has been given the honor of Composer of the Year (1991) for the American Guild of Organists. During his second visit to Chile, Adler was elected to the Chilean Academy of Fine Arts (1993) "for his outstanding contributions to the world of music as composer, conductor, and author". He was initiated as an honorary member of the Gamma Theta (1960, University of North Texas) and the Alpha Alpha (1966, National Honorary) chapters of Phi Mu Alpha Sinfonia, and in 1986 was named a National Arts Associate to Sigma Alpha Iota, international music fraternity for women. In 1998, he was awarded the Brock Commission from the American Choral Directors Association.

External images
- Photograph of Samuel Adler at the Juilliard School in 2013; Here on Getty images
- Historical photographs of Samuel Adler conducting Here on Milken Archive

In May, 2018, Adler was awarded the German Bundesverdienstkreuz 1. Klasse (Order of Merit – Officer's Cross), presented to him in New York by Consul General David Gill. On June 1, 2018, Adler was awarded an honorary Doctor of Humane Letters, and presented the graduation address at Hebrew Union College – Jewish Institute of Religion's Cincinnati graduation ceremony.

== Works ==
Adler's catalogue includes over 400 published works in all media, including three operas, six symphonies, ten string quartets, at least eleven concerti (organ, piano, violin, viola or clarinet, cello, flute, guitar, saxophone quartet, woodwind quintet), many shorter orchestral works, works for wind ensemble and band, chamber music, a great deal of choral music, liturgical music, and songs.

=== Solo instrumental ===
- Four Composer Portraits (Birthday Cards for Solo Piano), for unaccompanied piano
- Bassoonery (Study for Bassoon Solo), for unaccompanied bassoon (1965)
- A Bonnie Tune (A Scherzo for Solo Flute), for unaccompanied flute (2012)
- Bravura (A Concert Piece for Bass Trombone), for unaccompanied bass trombone (2012)
- Bridges to Span Adversity, for harpsichord (1991)
- Cantilena, for solo F horn (2018)
- Canto III, for solo violin
- Canto V
- Canto VII Unaccompanied tuba solo // ungraded (1976)
- Canto VIII, for solo piano (1976)
- Canto IX, for Multiple Percussion Solo (1979), co-composed with John H. Beck calling for 5 timpani and 6 rototoms
- Clarinon, for unaccompanied B-flat clarinet
- Fantasy, for solo piano (2014)
- Festschrift, for solo piano
- Flaunting, for unaccompanied flute
- From Generation to Generation, for solo organ
- In Memory of Milton, for solo violin (2012)
- In Praise of Bach, for solo organ (2003)
- Meadowmountetudes (Four Studies Of 20th-Century Techniques), for solo violin (1996)
- Oboration, for unaccompanied oboe (1965)
- The Sense of Touch (Eight Short Pieces Introducing the Young Pianist to Techniques Used in Twentieth-Century Music), for solo piano (1983)
- Solemn Soliloquy, for solo violin (2015)
- Sonata, for solo guitar (1990)
- Sonata, for harpsichord (1984)
- Three Piano Preludes, for solo piano
- Thy Song Expands My Spirit (A Tribute to Aaron Copland on His 80th Birthday), for solo piano (1983)
- Two Meditations, for organ (1965)
- ’’Variations on the Japanese Lullaby “Komori Uta”, for solo trombone (2022)

=== Chamber ensemble ===
- Acrostics (Four Games for Six Players)
- Be Not Afraid: The Isle Is Full Of Noises, for brass quintet
- Brahmsiana
- Caccia, for two flutes
- Concert Piece
- Contrasting Inventions
- Diary of a Journey
- Divertimento
- Divertissement, for viola and marimba
- Divertissement, for violin and marimba
- Festival Fanfare and Dance, for brass ensemble
- Fidl-Fantazye: A Klezmer Concerto, for violin and piano (2017)
- Five Movements
- Five Vignettes, for 12 trombones (1968)
- Four Dialogues for Euphonium, for euphonium and marimba
- Into the Radiant Boundaries, for viola and guitar
- Introit & Toccatina
- L'Olam Vaed, for cello and piano
- Let the Trumpet Sound, for trumpet and organ (2015)
- Life Is an Ecstasy, for trumpet and organ (2017)
- Pasiphae, for piano and percussion
- Pensive Soliloquy, for E-flat alto saxophone and piano (1998)
- Ports Of Call, for violin duet
- Praeludium
- Primavera Amarilla
- Quintet, for piano and string quartet
- Recitative and Rondo Capriccioso, for flute and piano (2014)
- Romp, for string quartet
- Scherzo Schmerzo, for trumpet, horn, trombone, tuba, and percussion
- Sonata, for horn and piano (1948)
- Sonata, for flute and piano (2006)
- Sonata, for viola and piano (1987)
- String Quartet No. 6 (A Whitman Serenade for medium voice and string quartet)
- String Quartet No. 9 (2010)
- String Quartet No. 10 (2015)
- Three Pieces, for cello and piano (2016)
- Time in Tempest Everywhere
- Trio ("5 Snapshots"), for string trio
- Trumpetry
- Two Southern Appalachian Folk Songs, for violin and piano (2014)

=== Vocal/choral ===
- Five Choral Scherzi, for mixed chorus, viola, and guitar
- In Praise Of Labor, for voice and piano
- Jonah (The Man Without Tolerance), for SATB chorus and orchestra
- Nuptial Scene (1975)
- Of Love and Dreams, for voice and piano (2018)
- Of Saints & Sinners-Mez
- Passionate Sword-Fl/Cl
- A Psalm Trilogy, for a cappella SATB chorus (1997)
- Recalling The Yesterdays, for mezzo-soprano, flute, clarinet, violin, cello, piano, and percussion
- Serenade
- Sixth String Quartet
- Song Of Songs Fragments, for mezzo-soprano, clarinet, and piano
- Those Were The Days, for voice and piano
- Two Shelley Songs, for SATB chorus and piano (1982)
- To Remember: To Be Remembered
- Todesfuge, for tenor voice and piano
- We Believe A Hymn Of Faith
- Five Sephardic Choruses (1991)
- The Binding, An Oratorio in Three Parts, for soli, chorus and orchestra

=== Orchestra ===
- All Nature Plays
- American Airs and Dances
- Art Creates Artists
- A Bridge to Understanding
- Centennial
- Drifting on Wind and Currents
- Elegy, for string orchestra
- In Just Spring
- In The Spirit Of Bach, for string orchestra (2015)
- Jonah (The Man Without Tolerance), for SATB chorus and orchestra
- Man Lebt Nur Einmal (Darum Tanzen Wir), for large orchestra
- Serenade
- Seven Variations on 'God Save the King', for small or chamber orchestra
- Shadow Dances
- Show An Affirming Flame
- Symphony No. 1 (1953)
- Symphony No. 2 (1957)
- Symphony No. 3 ("Diptych", 1960, rev. 1980)
- Symphony No. 4 ("Geometrics", 1965)
- Symphony No. 5 ("We Are the Echoes"), for mezzo-soprano and orchestra (1975)
- Symphony No. 6 (1985)
- Time in Tempest Everywhere, for soprano, oboe, and chamber orchestra
- We Believe: A Hymn of Faith

=== Orchestra with soloist(s) ===
- Arcos Concerto (A Bridge between the Old and the New), for flute, oboe, clarinet, bassoon and string orchestra
- Beyond the Pale (A Portrait of a Klezmer), for clarinet and string orchestra
- Concerto, for cello and orchestra (1999)
- Concerto, for viola and orchestra (2002)
- Concerto, for violin and orchestra (2015)
- Concerto "Shir Ha Ma'alot", for woodwind quintet and orchestra
- Concerto for Guitar and Orchestra (1998)
- Concerto for Horn and Orchestra
- Concerto for Organ and Orchestra
- Concerto for Piano and Orchestra (1983)
- Concerto No. 2, for piano and orchestra (1997)
- Fidl-Fantazye: A Klezmer Concerto, for violin and orchestra
- Lux Perpetua, for organ and orchestra
- Piano Concerto No. 3, for piano and string orchestra
- Those Were the Days

=== Band/wind ensemble ===
- American Airs and Dances
- A Testament
- Concerto for Guitar and Wind Ensemble
- Concerto for Winds, Brass and Percussion
- Dawn to Glory
- A Little Night and Day Music (1977)
- Pygmalion
- The River That Mines the Silences of Stones (2016)
- Rogues and Lovers
- Serenata Concertante, for flute, oboe, clarinet, bassoon, alto saxophone and wind ensemble
- Solemn March

=== Stage works ===
- The Outcast of Poker Flat, 1959, opera, staged Dallas, April 1961
- The Wrestler, 1971, opera, staged Dallas, June 1972
- The Disappointment, 1974, opera [reconstruction of an early ballad opera]
- The Lodge of Shadows, musical drama for baritone solo, dancers and orchestra
- The Waking, 1978, ballet

=== Liturgical music ===
- B'shaaray Tefilah: A Sabbath Service (1963), for Cantor, SATB and Organ
- Call to Worship (1995), for cantor, SATB and organ
- Hashkiveinu (1981), for cantor, SATB, and organ
- L'cha Dodi (1984), for solo, SATB, organ and flute
- Ma Tovu (2011), for tenor, SATB and organ
- Psalm 24 (2003), for SATB and organ
- Psalm 40, for SATB and organ
- Psalm 67, for SATB and organ
- Psalm 96, for SATB and organ
- Psalm 146 (1985), for SATB and organ
- Shir Chadash – A Friday Eve Service, for organ and 3 part choir (SAB)
- The Twenty-Third Psalm – Hebrew and English (1981), for tenor, SATB and organ
- Yamim Naraim I and II – A Two-Volume Anthology for the High Holy Days (1990–91), for cantor, SATB and organ

== Archived works ==
- The Samuel Adler Papers Collection at the Eastman School of Music's Sibley Music Library within the Ruth T. Watanabe Special Collections Department contains: selected examples of Adler's original compositional scores, arrangements, musical transcriptions, correspondence, professional papers from the years 1990-2018, publicity materials and selected commercial CD recordings of his compositions. The archive is an open collection which periodically receives new materials. It has been donated by Dr. Adler for the benefit of both researchers and students alike. Researchers may contact the staff archivist at the Ruth T. Watanabe Special Collections division of the Sibley Library for further assistance.
- The Synagogue Music of Samuel Adler Collection at the Milken Archive of Jewish Music contains selected recordings of Samuel Adler's sacred and liturgical compositions which he recorded as a member of the faculty at the university of Rochester's Eastman School of Music in Rochester, New York.
- Samuel Adler – Composer Web Archive at The United States Library of Congress contains links to compositions, recordings and publications by Samuel Adler which are available online.

== Notable students ==
External audio
- You may hear Samuel Adler conducting his composition Summer Stock Overture (1955) with Seventh Army Symphony Orchestra as recorded circa 1958 at 7ASO.org
- You may hear Samuel Adler conducting the concert overture The Hebrides, Op. 26 by Felix Mendelssohn with the Seventh Army Symphony Orchestra in 2006 at 7ASO.org
- Performance of the String Quartet No 10 (2015) by the Cassatt String Quartet
- You may hear "A Prophecy of Peace: The Choral Music of Samuel Adler" Here on Archive.org

Since 1997, Adler has been a member of the composition faculty at the Juilliard School in New York City. Among his most successful students are composers Fisher Tull, Kamran Ince, Eric Ewazen, Claude Baker, Marc Mellits, Robert Paterson, Gordon Stout, Chris Theofanidis, Michael Brown, Michael Glenn Williams, Gordon Chin, and Roger Briggs.
