= John Ferritto =

American classical composer (1934-2010)

- Born: January 20, 1937
- Died: January 7, 2010 (aged 72)
- Occupations: Conductor, composer, educator
- Spouse: Marcia Ferritto

John E. Ferritto (January 20, 1937 – January 7, 2010) was an American composer, conductor, and music professor.

He graduated with honors in piano and violin performance from the Cleveland Institute of Music, and also holds a M.M. in composition from Yale University, where he studied piano with Ward Davenny, conducting with Gustav Meier, and composition with Mel Powell. He also studied at the American Academy in Rome and at Tanglewood, with Gunther Schuller, and Erich Leinsdorf.

He made his conducting debut with the U.S. Seventh Army Symphony Orchestra on tour in Germany, France, and Italy. He was associate conductor of the New Haven Symphony, Conductor of the Chamber Orchestra of the North Shore in Chicago, and director/conductor of the American Federation of Musicians Congress of Strings in Cincinnati.

As a guest conductor, he has appeared with the Radio Television Orchestra of Bucharest, the State Orchestra of Greece, the Toledo Symphony, the Columbus Symphony Orchestra (Ohio), the Charleston S.C. Symphony, the Michigan Chamber Orchestra, Eastern Music Festival, the New Haven Opera, the New Haven Ballet, and the American Ballet Theatre. He has conducted the Orchestras of both the Peabody Conservatory and the Cleveland Institute of Music, and is the former director of the Kent/Blossom Summer Music program.

Additionally, he was conductor laureate of the Springfield Symphony Orchestra in Springfield, Ohio, after serving as music director and conductor, a post he held from 1971. He served on the theory and composition faculties at the University of Chicago, the University of Texas at Austin, and was Professor Emeritus of Composition at Kent State University.

Ferritto was married to the violist Marcia Ferritto.

John Ferritto died on January 7, 2010.

== Selected works ==
- Pavane, Toccata and Saraband for piano (1963)
- 5 Madrigals for mezzo-soprano solo (1964)
- Affigliazione for flute and piano (1966)
- Diffusione for clarinet, violin, double bass, guitar and percussion, Op. 2 (1966)
- Quattro diversioni for clarinet, viola and piano, Op. 3 (1966)
- Cinque caricature for cello and piano (1966)
- Quattro madrigali for baritone, alto flute and bass clarinet, Op. 5 (1967)
- Addio C.M. for clarinet solo, Op. 6 (1967)
- 4 Duos for soprano recorder and guitar, Op. 7 (1967)
- Canzone for unaccompanied viola, Op. 8 (1968)
- Oggi for soprano, clarinet and piano, Op. 9 (1969)
- Frammento for trumpet, vibraphone and double bass, Op. 10 (1970)
- Omaggio a Berio e Fellini for orchestra, Op. 11
- Sogni for soprano, viola (offstage) and orchestra, Op. 12 (1972)
- Quartetto for flute, horn, viola and piano, Op. 13 (1974)
- Intersezione for violin solo, Op. 14 (1975)
- Concertino for oboe, alto saxophone, bass, and percussion, Op. 15 (1976)
- Concerto for cello and orchestra, Op. 17 (1979)
- Sextet for woodwind quintet and piano, Op. 18 (1980)
- Celebrations for orchestra, Op. 19 (1983)
- Fantasy Duo for viola and piano, Op. 20 (1984)
- String Quartet, Op. 21 (1988)
- Movement for viola and percussion orchestra, Op. 22 (1989)
- Michris for flute and marimba (1989)
- Duo Toccata for viola and cello, Op. 24 (1990)
- Concerto fiori, for oboe and string orchestra, Op. 25 (1991); for Sara Bloom
- Colors for orchestra, Op. 26 (1992)
- Sonata Fantasy for clarinet and piano, Op. 29 (1993)
- Vignettes for 2 violins, viola and cello (1993)
- Semi-Suite for 2 pianos (1995)
- Variations on John Brown's Body for orchestra or band
- Ballad in Blue (In Memoriam Morton Gould) for string orchestra (1997)
- Aneurysm No. 6 for percussion quartet, Op. 31 (1997)
- Walking My Dog for flute (piccolo), violin and piano (1998)
- Dialogues I for marimba and string quartet, Op. 33 (1998)
- Dialogues II for alto saxophone and string quartet, Op. 34 (2000)
- Violin and Viola Duo, Op. 35 (2000)
- Sax Quartet, Op. 36 (2000)
- Dialogues III for horn and string quartet, Op. 37 (2001)
- Woodwind Quintet for flute, oboe, clarinet, horn and bassoon, Op. 38 (2001)
- Abstractions, Duo for viola and piano, Op. 39 (2001)
- Violette for 2 violas, Op. 40 (2001)
- Scherzo, Canzona, and Burlesco for bass clarinet and percussion, Op. 41
- Sempre Berio for bassoon and chamber ensemble, Op. 43 (2003)
- Piano Quintet

== Recordings ==
- 1974 - Ferritto, John. Oggi. New York: Composers Recordings.
