= Mikko Innanen (musician) =

Finnish saxophonist and composer

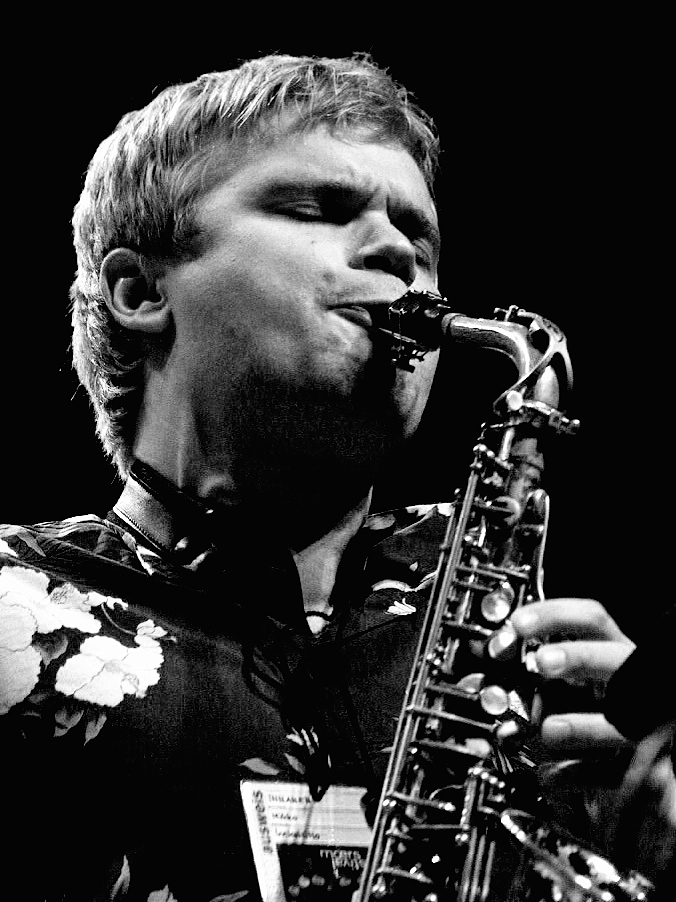
Mikko Innanen, moers festival 2007

Mikko Aleksi Innanen (born 28 February 1978 in Lapinjärvi) is a Finnish saxophonist and composer.

Innanen graduated in 2003 from the jazz department of Sibelius Academy, the only university level music academy in Finland. Innanen spent one year of his studies in Copenhagen, Denmark, at the Rhythmic Music Conservatory.

Over the last few years, he has played with a number of groups, including several groups with other Finnish jazz musicians such as Nuijamiehet, Gourmet, Mr Fonebone and Mikko Innanen & Innkvisitio as well as Delirium (with Danes Kasper Tranberg, Stefan Pasborg and Jonas Westergaard), Triot (with Pasborg and Nicolai Munch-Hansen), as a featured guest of the French trio Triade (Cedric Piromalli, Sebastian Boisseau and Nicolas Larmignat), The European Jazz Youth Orchestra, drummer Teppo Mäkynen's Teddy Rok 7, Itchy (Jakob Dinesen, Jeppe Skovbakke, Rune Kielsgaard), Ulf Krokors - Iro Haarla Loco Motife, Ibrahim Electric, Espoo Big Band and the UMO Jazz Orchestra.

He has also performed with Han Bennink, Jaak Sooäär, John Tchicai, Ingrid Jensen, Anders Bergcrantz, Marc Ducret, Tim Hagans, Chris Speed, Barry Guy, Juhani Aaltonen, Liudas Mockunas, Hiroshi Minami, Lelo Nika, Billy Cobham, Andre Sumelius, Marcus Shelby, Dayna Stephens and many others, including virtually all of the musicians currently active on the Finnish jazz scene and a growing number of international artists.

Innanen was awarded a one-year artist's grant by the Finnish State's Arts Council in 2003, the best soloist's prize at the International Competition for Jazz Groups in Getxo, Spain, in 2000 and the first prize at the first Jukka Perko saxophone competition in 2001. In 2004 Finnish jazz journalists voted Innanen as the runner-up alto, soprano and baritone saxophone player of the year 2003 and 2004.

== Selected recordings ==
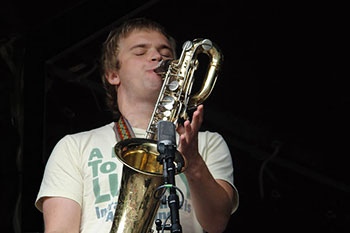
Mikko Innanen.

- Delirium: Eclexistence (2005, TUM Records)
- Gourmet: Six Acres of Broken Hearts (2004, Fiasko Records)
- Triot with John Tchicai: Sudden Happiness (2004, TUM Records)
- Delirium (2002, Fiasko Records)
- Gourmet: Glamour & Decadence (2001, Fiasko Records )
- Mr. Fonebone: Live featuring Ingrid Jensen (2000, Texicalli)
- Nuijamiehet (2000, Fiasko Records)
- Mr. Fonebone (1997, Antti Rissanen)

== External links and sources ==
- Profile at Fiasko Records
