= The Cold War in popular culture =

The Cold War was reflected in culture through music, movies, books, television, and other media, as well as sports, social beliefs, and behavior. Major elements of the Cold War included the perceived threat of communist expansion, a nuclear war, and – connected to both – espionage. Many works use the Cold War as a backdrop or directly take part in a fictional conflict between the United States and the Soviet Union and their respective allies. The period 1953–62 saw Cold War themes becoming mainstream as a public preoccupation.

== Fictional spy stories ==
Cloak and dagger stories became part of the popular culture of the Cold War in both East and West, with innumerable novels and movies that showed how polarized and dangerous the world was. Soviet audiences were thrilled by spy stories showing how their KGB agents protected the motherland by foiling dirty work by the intelligence agencies of the United States, United Kingdom, and Israel. After 1963, Hollywood increasingly depicted the CIA as clowns (as in the comedy TV series Get Smart) or villains (as in Oliver Stone's 1992 film JFK). Ian Fleming's infamous spy novels about the MI6 agent James Bond also referenced elements of the Cold War when being adapted into films. One example of this includes the first Bond film, Dr. No, which was released in 1962 and used the Cuban Missile Crisis as a plot base. However, Cuba was substituted for Jamaica in the film.

== Books and literature ==
=== Novels and other fiction ===
- Atomsk by Paul Linebarger, published in 1949, is the first espionage novel of the Cold War.
- Alas, Babylon by Pat Frank
- Arc Light by Eric L. Harry
- Cat's Cradle by Kurt Vonnegut
- The Dispossessed by Ursula Le Guin is a science fiction novel exploring the differences in culture and philosophy between several alien societies, including that of an anarcho-syndicalist planet where most of the novel is set.
- Red Alert by Peter George
- Resurrection Day by Brendan DuBois
- Twilight 2000, role-playing game.
- Warday by Whitley Strieber and James Kunetka
- Tom Clancy novels: Red Storm Rising a 1986 novel by Tom Clancy, about a conventional NATO/Warsaw Pact war. Other Tom Clancy novels which are part of the Jack Ryan universe, most especially The Hunt for Red October and The Cardinal of the Kremlin, though all of his books from this era are featured against a background of east–west conflict. Later Red Rabbit narrates a "What-If" scenario of the Soviets being behind the 1981 assassination attempt on the Pope.
- 1984 by George Orwell
- Frederick Forsyth's spy novels sold in the hundreds of thousands. The Fourth Protocol, whose title refers to a series of conventions that, if broken, will lead to nuclear war and that are now, of course, all broken except for the fourth and last thread, was made into a major film starring British actor Michael Caine.
- The Manchurian Candidate, by Richard Condon, took a different approach and portrayed a Communist conspiracy against the US acting not through leftists or pacifists but through a thinly veiled allusion to Joseph McCarthy. The logic of this was that if McCarthyists were accusing so many people of being communist agents, it could only be to divert attention from the real communists. The theme of collusion between international communists and Western rightists would be picked up again by many movies (Goldfinger, A View to a Kill) or television shows (episodes of MacGyver or Airwolf), which would feature an alliance between power-hungry communists attacking the free world from the outside and profit-driven capitalists undermining it for financial gain.
- The Ugly American by William J. Lederer and Eugene Burdick. Originally published in 1958, this book tells the story of how the US government handled foreign policy very poorly. The main character, Homer Atkins, discovers this sad truth when he is dispatched to the fictitious country of Sarkhan (in Southeast Asia.)
- One Day in the Life of Ivan Denisovich by Alexander Solzhenitsyn. This acclaimed book, first published in 1962, exposed the horrors of the Russian prison camps during WWII under the Stalinist regime. It is a semi-autobiographical tale about a dutiful soldier who is sent to a Siberian camp, after being falsely accused of treason. Solzhenitsyn received the Nobel Prize in literature.
- Starship Troopers by Robert A. Heinlein

=== Comic Books ===
Comics published during the Cold War provided both entertainment and political commentary. Themes of foreign wars, radiation, and social injustices were prevalent within the genre. Comics like Fantastic Four show American's relationship to the nuclear family unit, while other comics like Spider-Man and The Incredible Hulk show societal fears related to nuclear power and its effects. Other comics were less focused on fantastical elements and instead set their stories within Cold War events. Marines In Action was a comic series that ran from 1955 to 1957 that focuses on fictional characters within the Korean War. These comics were pro-war, which was a common sentiment among military centered stories.Golgo 13, a Japanese comic published since October 1968 also portrayed Cold War events like Fall of the Berlin Wall and Tiananmen Square protests from the perspective of the protagonist, a professional hitman hired by different powers.

=== Militant memoirs and propaganda ===
The Turner Diaries (1978) is a work of fiction, but is confirmed to have inspired terrorist attacks and far-right extremist movements. In the final scene before the epilogue, the main character carries out a suicide attack on The Pentagon, in an aircraft carrying a nuclear bomb.

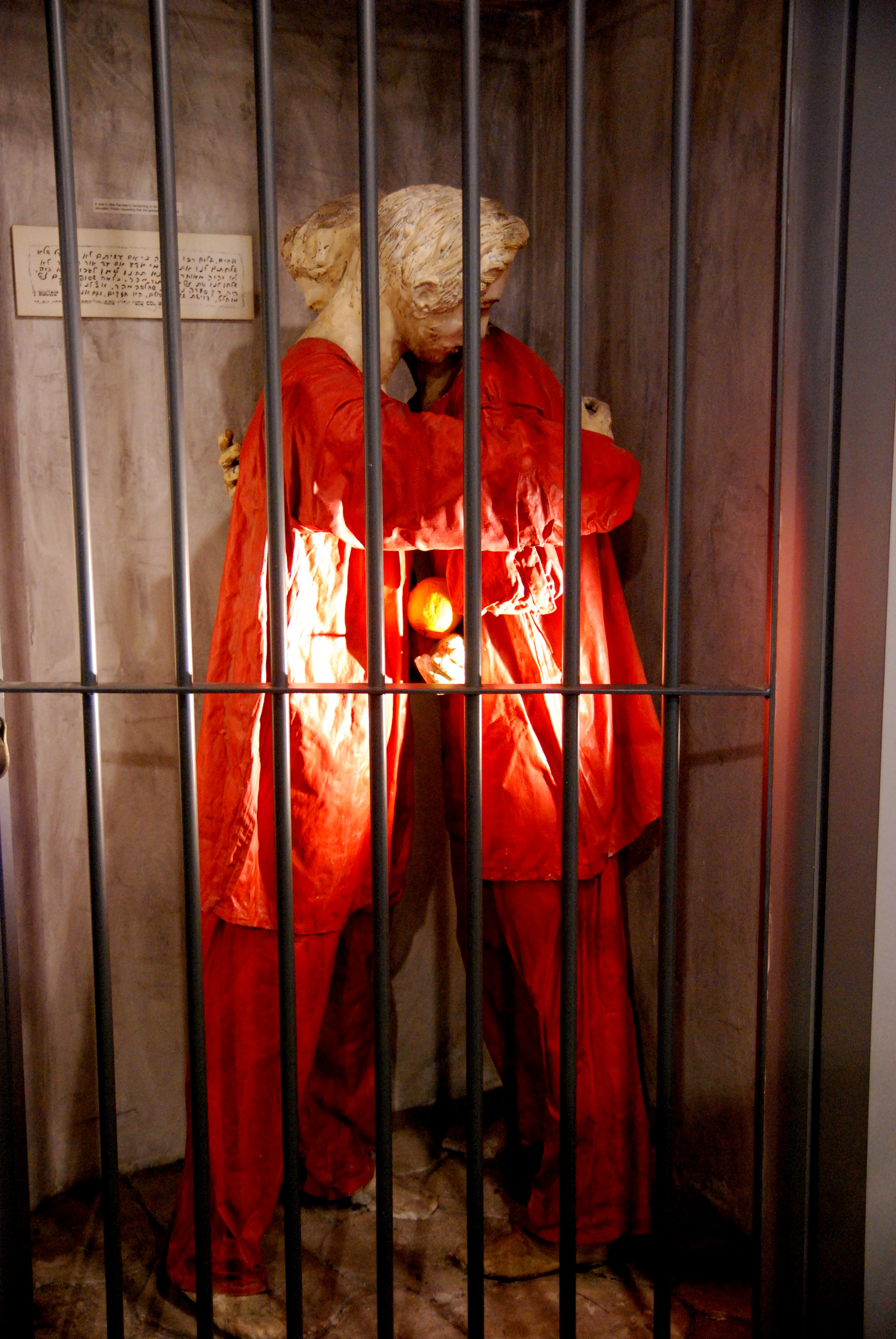
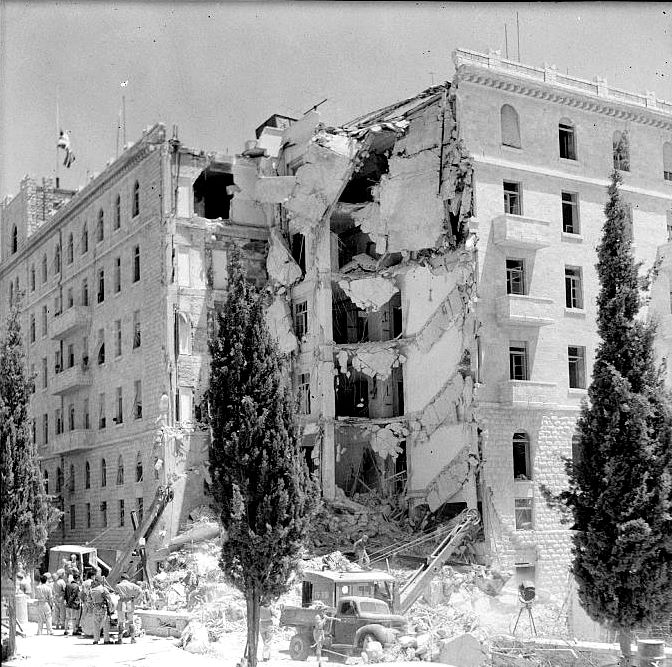
Left: Exhibit in the Lehi Museum depicting the prisoners in red uniforms. Right: The most famous Irgun attack, the 1946 King David Hotel bombing. Many of the technical and propaganda techniques they used have now become ubiquitous in modern terrorism.

The Revolt, written by Menachem Begin before he became Prime Minister, tells the story of the Lehi (referred to by their translated name's acronym, F.F.I. "Freedom Fighters of Israel" in early English editions) and Begin's own Irgun fighters during the Jewish insurgency in Palestine. The Revolt influenced groups from a wide variety of ideologies. Some of these groups began to use suicide attacks in the 1990s. The book was allegedly found Osama bin Laden's al-Qaeda organization. Begin praised his militants' willingness to die, "These two wonderful young men greeted the sentence with the singing of Hatikvah". The "two wonderful young men" were the two who blew themselves up in 1947, he described their deaths, "even before they put on their red uniforms. They too held their heads high when they faced their judges… But they did not reach the gallows. They too sang on the threshold of death — a song of faith in God: 'Lord of the world who reigned before creation'. But their song ended with a great explosion which shattered the silence of the prison in occupied Jerusalem". In 1977 the author became prime minister, after previously being in opposition. Historical militants featured prominently in his political speeches. He praised the actions of his militants during the insurgency in Palestine in the 1940s, including the leader of the cell who bombed the King David Hotel (killing 91 people and 1 terrorist). His favourites were, again, the two young militants who blew themselves up in Jerusalem prison in 1947.

== Post Cold War works about the Cold War ==
=== Games about the Cold War ===
- Twilight Struggle is a 2005 card-based board game by GMT Games that depicts the events of the entire Cold War, starting from Joseph Stalin to Ronald Reagan. The game was turned into a video game in 2016.

=== Films about Historical Cold War events ===
- Thirteen Days (2001), about the Cuban Missile Crisis.
- Bridge of Spies (2015), about a spy swap.

== Cinema ==
=== Use as early Cold War propaganda ===
During the Cold War, the United States and the Soviet Union each invested heavily in propaganda designed to sway both domestic and foreign opinion in the respective country's favor, especially using motion pictures. The quality gap between American and Soviet film gave the Americans a distinct advantage over the Soviet Union; the United States was readily prepared to utilize their cinematic superiority as a way to effectively impact the public opinion in a way the Soviet Union could not. Americans hoped that achievements in cinema would compensate for America's failure to keep up with Soviet development of nuclear weapons and advancements in space technology. The use of film as an effective form of widespread propaganda transformed cinema into another Cold War battlefront alongside the arms race and Space Race. Films from both the United States and Soviet Union can be seen as artifacts of propaganda as well as resistance.

==== US cinema ====
The Americans took advantage of their pre-existing cinematic advantage over the Soviet Union, using movies as another way to create the Communist enemy. In the early years of the Cold War (between 1948 and 1953), seventy explicitly anti-communist films were released. American films incorporated a wide scale of Cold War themes and issues into all genres of film, which gave American motion pictures a particular lead over Soviet film. Despite the audiences' lack of zeal for Anti-Communist/Cold War related cinema, the films produced evidently did serve as successful propaganda in both the United States and the Soviet Union. The films released during this time received a response from the Soviet Union, which subsequently released its own array of films to combat the depiction of the Communist threat.

Several organizations played a key role in ensuring that Hollywood acted in the national best interest of the US, like the Catholic Legion of Decency and the Production Code Administration, which acted as two conservative groups that controlled a great deal of the national repertoire during the early stages of the Cold War. These groups filtered out politically subversive or morally questionable movies. More blatantly illustrating the shift from cinema as an art form to cinema as a form of strategic weapon, the Motion Picture Alliance for the Preservation of American Ideals ensured that filmmakers adequately expressed their patriotism. Beyond these cinema-specific efforts, the FBI played a surprisingly large role in the production of movies, instituting a triangular-shaped film strategy: FBI set up a surveillance operation in Hollywood, made efforts to pinpoint and blacklist Communists, secretly laundered intelligence through HUAC, and further helped in producing movies that "fostered [the FBI] image as the protector of the American people." The FBI additionally endorsed films, including Oscar winner The Hoaxters.

In the 1960s, Hollywood began using spy films to create the enemy through film. Previously, the influence of the Cold War could be seen in many, if not all, genres of American film. By the 1960s, spy films were effectively a "weapon of confrontation between the two world systems." Both sides heightened paranoia and created a sense of constant unease in viewers through the increased production of spy films. Film depicted the enemy in a way that caused both sides to increase general suspicion of foreign and domestic threat.

==== Soviet cinema ====
Between 1946 and 1954, the Soviet Union mimicked the US adoption of cinema as a weapon. The Central United Film Studios and the Committee on Cinema Affairs were committed to the Cold War battle. Under Stalin's rule, movies could only be made within strict confines. Cinema and government were, as it stood, inextricably linked. Many films were banned for being insufficiently patriotic. Nonetheless, the Soviet Union produced a plethora of movies with the aim to blatantly function as negative propaganda.

In the same fashion as the United States, the Soviets were eager to depict their enemy in the most unflattering light possible. Between 1946 and 1950, 45.6% of on-screen villains in Soviet films were either American or British. Films addressed non-Soviet themes that emerged in American film in an attempt to derail the criticism and paint the US as the enemy. Attacks made by the United States against the Soviet Union were simply used as material by Soviet filmmakers for their own attacks on the US. Soviet cinema during this time took its liberty with history: "Did the Red Army engage in the mass rapes of German women and pillage German art treasures, factories, and forests? In Soviet cinema, the opposite was true in [The Meeting on the Elbe]." This demonstrated the heightened paranoia of the Soviet Union.

Despite efforts made to elevate the status of cinema, such as changing the Committee of Cinema Affairs to the Ministry of Cinematography, cinema did not seem to work as invigorating propaganda as was planned. Although the anti-American films were notably popular with audiences, the Ministry did not feel the message had reached the general public, perhaps due to the fact that the majority of moviegoers seeing the films produced were, perhaps, the Soviets most likely to admire American culture.

After Stalin's death, a Main Administration of Cinema Affairs replaced the Ministry, allowing the filmmakers more freedom due to the lack of direct government control. Many of the films released throughout the late 1950s and 1960s focused on spreading a positive image of Soviet life, intent to prove that Soviet life was indeed better than American life.

Russian science fiction emerged from a prolonged period of censorship in 1957, opened up by de-Stalinization and real Soviet achievements in the space race, typified by Ivan Efremov's galactic epic, Andromeda (1957). Official Communist science fiction transposed the laws of historical materialism to the future, scorning Western nihilistic writings and predicting a peaceful transition to universal communism. Scientocratic visions of the future nevertheless implicitly critiqued the bureaucratically developed socialism of the present. Dissident science fiction writers emerged, such as the Strugatski brothers, Boris and Arkadi, with their "social fantasies," problematizing the role of intervention in the historical process, or Stanislaw Lem's tongue-in-cheek exposures of man's cognitive limitations.

=== Films depicting nuclear war ===
- Duck and Cover, a 1951 educational movie explaining what to do in the event of a nuclear attack.
- Five, a 1951 film about five survivors, one woman and four men, of an atomic war that has wiped out the rest of the human race (while leaving all infrastructure intact). The five come together at a remote, isolated hillside house in Southern California, where they try to figure out how to survive while also being forced to face an unknown future.
- On the Beach (1959) depicted a gradually dying, post-apocalyptic world in Australia that remained after a nuclear Third World War.
- The Mouse on the Moon (1963) a comedy satire about, the people of the Duchy of Grand Fenwick, a microstate in Europe, attempt space flight using wine as a propellant. It satirises the space race, Cold War and politics.
- Ladybug Ladybug (1963) an elementary school nuclear bomb warning alarm sounds.
- Dr. Strangelove or: How I Learned to Stop Worrying and Love the Bomb (1964) – A black comedy film that satirizes the Cold War and the threat of nuclear warfare.
- Fail-Safe (1964) – A film based on a novel of the same name about an American bomber crew and nuclear tensions.
- The War Game (BBC, 1965; aired 1985) – Depicts the effects of a nuclear war in Britain following a conventional war that escalates to nuclear war.
- Damnation Alley (20th Century Fox, 1977) – Surprise ICBM attack launched on the United States, and the subsequent efforts of a small band of survivors from a missile silo in the Mojave Desert in California to reach another group of survivors in Albany, New York.
- The Children's Story (1982) short film, which originally aired on TV's Mobil Showcase, depicts the first day of indoctrination of an elementary school classroom by a new teacher, representing a totalitarian government that has taken over the United States. It is based on the 1960 short story of the same name by James Clavell.
- The Day After (1983) – This made-for-television-movie by ABC that depicts the consequences of a nuclear war in Lawrence, Kansas and the surrounding area.
- WarGames (1983) – About a young computer hacker who unknowingly hacks into a defense computer and risks starting a nuclear war.
- Testament (PBS, 1983) – Depicts the after-effects of a nuclear war in a small town, 100 miles north of San Francisco, California.
- Countdown to Looking Glass (HBO, 1984) – A film that presents a simulated news broadcast about a nuclear war.
- Threads (BBC, 1984) – A film that is set in the British city of Sheffield and shows the long-term results of a nuclear war on the surrounding area.
- The Sacrifice (Sweden, 1986) – A philosophical drama about nuclear war.
- The Manhattan Project (1986) – Though not about a nuclear war, it was seen as a cautionary tale.
- When the Wind Blows (1986) – An animated film about an elderly British couple in a post-nuclear war world.
- Miracle Mile (1988) – A film about two lovers in Los Angeles leading up to a nuclear war.
- By Dawn's Early Light (HBO, 1990) – About rogue Soviet military officials framing NATO for a nuclear attack in order to spark a full-blown nuclear war.
- On the Beach (Showtime, 2000) – A remake of the 1959 film.
- Fail-Safe (CBS, 2000) – A remake of the 1964 film.

=== Films depicting a conventional United States–Soviet Union war ===
In addition to fears of a nuclear war between the United States and the Soviet Union, during the Cold War, there were also fears of a direct, large scale conventional conflict between the two superpowers.

- Invasion U.S.A. (1952) – The 1952 film showed a Soviet invasion of the United States succeeding because the citizenry had fallen into moral decay, war profiteering, and isolationism. The film was later parodied on Mystery Science Theater 3000.
- Red Nightmare, a 1962 government-sponsored short subject narrated by Jack Webb, imagined a Soviet-dominated United States as a result of the protagonist's negligence of his "all-American" duties.
- World War III, a 1982 NBC miniseries about a Soviet invasion of Alaska.
- Red Dawn (1984) – presented a conventional Soviet attack with limited, strategic Soviet nuclear strikes on the United States, aided by allies from Latin America, and the exploits of a group of high schoolers who form a guerrilla group to oppose them.
- Invasion U.S.A. (1985) – This film depicts a Soviet agent leading Latin American Communist guerillas launching attacks in the United States, and an ex-CIA agent played by Chuck Norris opposing him and his mercenaries.
- Amerika (ABC, 1987), a peaceful takeover of the United States by the Soviet Union.

=== Films depicting Cold War espionage ===
- Tinker Tailor Soldier Spy is a 2011 Cold War spy thriller adaptation of the 1974 John le Carré novel of the same name. It is set in London in the early 1970s and follows the hunt for a Soviet double agent at the top of the British secret service.
- The Spy Who Came In from the Cold is a 1965 British Cold War spy film based on the 1963 John le Carré novel. The film depicts a British agent's mission as a faux defector to East Germany to sow damaging disinformation about a powerful East German intelligence officer.
- Firefox is a 1982 film based on a Craig Thomas novel of the same name. The plot details an American plot to steal a highly advanced Soviet fighter aircraft (MiG-31 Firefox) which is capable of Mach 6, is invisible to radar, and carries weapons controlled by thought.
- The Hunt for Red October is a 1990 film based on the 1984 Tom Clancy novel of the same name about the captain of a technologically advanced Soviet ballistic missile submarine that attempts to defect to the United States.
- James Bond first appeared in 1953. While the primary antagonists in the majority of the novels were Soviet agents, the films were only vaguely based on the Cold War. The Bond movies followed the political climate of the time in their depictions of Soviets and "Red" Chinese. In the 1954 version of Casino Royale, Bond was an American agent working with the British to destroy a ruthless Soviet agent in France, but became more widely known as Agent 007, James Bond, of Her Majesty's Secret Service, who was played by Sean Connery until 1971 and by several actors since. Although Bond films often used the Cold War as a backdrop, the Soviet Union itself was almost never Bond's enemy, that role being more often left to fictional and apolitical criminal organisations (like the infamous SPECTRE). However, Red China was in league with Bond's enemies in the films Goldfinger, You Only Live Twice and The Man With the Golden Gun, while some later movies (Octopussy, The Living Daylights) featured a rogue Soviet general as the enemy.
- TASS Upolnomochen Zayavit... (TASS is Authorized to Announce ... ) – a Soviet TV series based on Julian Semenov's novel. The plot of the movie is set around fictional African country Nagonia, where CIA agents are preparing a military coup, while KGB agent Slavin is trying to prevent it. Slavin succeeds by blackmailing the corrupt American spy John Glebe.
- The Falcon and the Snowman is a 1985 film directed by John Schlesinger about two young American men, Christopher Boyce and Daulton Lee, who sold United States security secrets to the Soviet Union. The film is based upon the 1979 book The Falcon and the Snowman: A True Story of Friendship and Espionage by Robert Lindsey.
- Gotcha! (1985 film) is a film about a college student named Jonathan (Anthony Edwards) who plays a game called Gotcha in which he hunts and is hunted by other students with paint guns on campus. Jonathan goes to France on vacation, meets a beautiful woman named Sasha (Linda Fiorentino), travels with her to East Germany, and unknowingly becomes involved in the spy game between the US and USSR.
- The Kremlin Letter is a 1970 American neo-noir espionage thriller set in the winter of 1969–1970, at the height of US-Soviet tensions.
- No Way Out a 1987 film about a spy myth that is created to cover up the killing of the mistress of a high American official.

=== Other films about Soviet Union–United States fears and rivalry ===
- The Third Man (1949) – A major subplot deals with the refugee status of a Czechoslovak woman, and the Russian attempts to deport her back to Czechoslovakia.
- The Russians Are Coming the Russians Are Coming (1966) – A film about a Soviet submarine that accidentally runs aground near a small New England town.
- Russian Roulette (1975) – A film starring George Segal about a Canadian Mounty attempting to stop a KGB plot to assassinate a Soviet premier in Vancouver.
- Telefon (1977) – A film starring Charles Bronson and Donald Pleasence about the net of deep-cover sleeper agents in the US who are being activated by the deserted KGB agent.
- The Return of Godzilla (1984) — In the 16th installment of the Toho Godzilla franchise, a Soviet nuclear submarine is destroyed by the titular creature, causing tensions between the Soviet Union & America until it is proven by the Japanese government that Godzilla was responsible for its destruction. Later in the movie, a Russian nuclear missile is accidentally fired at Godzilla from a space satellite until an American missile detonates it in the stratosphere long before it can strike Godzilla in Tokyo.
- Rocky IV (1985) – In this installment of the Rocky saga, Rocky Balboa has to fight Ivan Drago, an extremely powerful boxer from the Soviet Union.
- Spies Like Us (1985) – A comedy film starring Dan Aykroyd and Chevy Chase as decoy agents send to infiltrate the Soviet Union.
- Russkies (1987) – A movie about a shipwrecked Soviet Navy sailor who washes ashore in Key West, Florida and is befriended by three American boys.
- Project X (1987) – A film starring Matthew Broderick where a US airman works with chimpanzees on Cold War-related projects.
- White Nights (1985) - An American (Gregory Hines), who had defected to the Soviet Union to escape racism, and a Soviet (Mikhail Baryshnikov) who had defected to the United States and is returned to the Soviet Union by accident, discover their common humanity through dance.

== Television ==
- Airwolf
- Danger Man, (Known as Secret Agent in the United States)
- I Led Three Lives – The first foray into mass culture dealing with the Cold War.
- I Spy (1965–68 US television series)
- Get Smart
- MacGyver
- The Man from U.N.C.L.E.
- Mission: Impossible
- Quatermass II
- Several episodes of Star Trek featured a futuristic version of the Cold War, in terms of the United Federation of Planets vs. The Klingon Empire and the Romulan Star Empire, analogs for the United States, the Soviet Union, and the People's Republic of China, respectively. "A Taste of Armageddon" also showed the concept of MAD in a war between opposing sides.
- Scarecrow and Mrs. King
- Ivan the Terrible 1976 sitcom
- The Rocky and Bullwinkle Show 1960s cartoon for children and adults where the villains are Boris and Natasha, who were both parodies of the Soviet spies.
- The Sandbaggers
- The Twilight Zone, a number of episodes of which depicted fallout shelters, such as the 1961 episode, The Shelter, produced as a social commentary on the Civil Defense push during the Berlin Crisis of 1961, and the 1987 Ronald Reagan era "Shelter Skelter". Twilight Zone episodes commenting on other aspects of the Cold War, and World Peace include the 1986 A Small Talent for War.
- The Transformers (TV series), including the fact that the two first seasons take place during the latter years of the Cold War, an episode, Prime Target directly refers to an event of the episode as The highest point of tension between United States and Soviet Union, since the Cuban Missile Crisis.
- The Tomorrow People (1970's TV Series), featured plot lines reflecting Cold War tension between the desire of British and Soviet militaries to use the Tomorrow People's fictional "special powers" of telepathy, teleportation, and telekinesis.

=== Television commercials ===
Wendy's Hamburger Chain ran a television commercial showing a supposed "Soviet Fashion Show", which featured the same large, unattractive woman wearing the same dowdy outfit in a variety of situations, the only difference being the accessory she carried (for example, a flashlight for 'nightwear' or a beach ball for 'swimwear'). This was supposedly a lampoon on how the Soviet society is characterised with uniformity and standardisation, in contrast to the US characterised with freedom of choice, as highlighted in the Wendy's commercial.

Apple Computer's "1984" ad, despite paying homage to George Orwell's novel of the same name, follows a more serious yet ambitious take on the freedom vs. totalitarianism theme evident between the US and Soviet societies at the time.

=== Political commercials ===
==== Daisies and mushroom clouds ====
"Daisy" advertisement

Daisy was the most famous campaign commercial of the Cold War. Aired only once, on 7 September 1964, it was a factor in Lyndon B. Johnson's defeat of Barry Goldwater in the 1964 presidential election. The contents of the commercial were controversial, and their emotional impact was searing.

The commercial opens with a very young girl standing in a meadow with chirping birds, slowly counting the petals of a daisy as she picks them one by one. Her sweet innocence, along with mistakes in her counting, endear her to the viewer. When she reaches "9", an ominous-sounding male voice is suddenly heard intoning the countdown of a rocket launch. As the girl's eyes turn toward something she sees in the sky, the camera zooms in until one of her pupils fills the screen, blacking it out. The countdown reaches zero, and the blackness is instantly replaced by a simultaneous bright flash and thunderous sound which is then followed by footage of a nuclear explosion, an explosion similar in appearance to the near surface burst Trinity test of 1945, followed by another cut to footage of a billowing mushroom cloud.

As the fireball ascends, an edit cut is made, this time to a close-up section of incandescence in the mushroom cloud, over which a voiceover from Johnson is played, which states emphatically, "These are the stakes! To make a world in which all of God's children can live, or to go into the dark. We must either love each other, or we must die." Another voiceover then says, "Vote for President Johnson on November 3. The stakes are too high for you to stay home." (Two months later, Johnson won the election in an electoral landslide.)

==== Bear in the woods ====
Bear in the woods was a 1984 campaign advertisement endorsing Ronald Reagan for President that depicted a brown bear (likely symbolizing the Soviet Union) wandering through the woods. Despite the fact that the ad never explicitly mentioned the Soviet Union, the Cold War or Walter Mondale, it thematically suggested that Reagan was more capable of dealing with the Soviets than his opponent.

== Humor ==
The 1984 "We begin bombing in five minutes" incident is an example of Cold War dark humor. It was a personal microphone gaffe joke between Ronald Reagan, his White House staff and radio technicians that was accidentally leaked to the US populace. At the time, Reagan was well known before this incident for telling Soviet/Russian jokes in televised debates, many of which have now been uploaded to video hosting websites.

We begin bombing in five minutes

My fellow Americans, I'm pleased to tell you today that I've signed legislation that will outlaw Russia forever. We begin bombing in five minutes.

The joke was a parody of the opening line of that day's speech:

My fellow Americans, I'm pleased to tell you that today I signed legislation that will allow student religious groups to begin enjoying a right they've too long been denied—the freedom to meet in public high schools during non-school hours, just as other student groups are allowed to do.

Following his trip to Los Angeles in 1959 and being refused entry into Disneyland, on security grounds, a dejected Soviet Premier Nikita Khrushchev joked, "... just now I was told that I could not go to Disneyland, I asked 'Why not?' What is it, do you have rocket launching pads there?" The only person more disappointed than Khrushchev was Walt Disney himself, who claimed he had been looking forward to showing off his 'submarine fleet', which was actually the Submarine Voyage ride.

== Arts ==
The United States and the Soviet Union engaged in competition vis-à-vis the arts. Cultural competition played out in Moscow, New York, London, and Paris. In 1946 America opened an exhibition called 'Advancing American Art' which gained popularity with the aims of expressing American art, in response the Soviets opened a respective exhibition showcasing Soviet Realism. The Soviets excelled at ballet and chess, the Americans at jazz and abstract expressionist paintings. The US funded its own ballet troupes, and both used ballet as political propaganda, using dance to reflect life style in the "battle for the hearts and minds of men." The defection of a premier dancer became a major coup.

Chess was inexpensive enough—and the Russians always won until America unleashed Bobby Fischer. Vastly more expensive was the Space Race, as a proxy for scientific supremacy (with a technology with obvious military uses). As well when it came to sports the two countries both competed in the Olympics during the Cold War period which also created severe tension when the West boycotted the first Russian Olympics in 1980.

== Music ==
External audio
- You may listen to CBS's Alfredo Antonini Orchestra with tenor Nestor Mesta Chayres and accordionist John Serry Sr. performing the bolero "La Morena de me Copla" in 1946; Here on DAHR

=== 1940s ===
As President Franklin D. Roosevelt died and World War II concluded with the detonation of nuclear weapons over Japan in 1945, the stage was quickly set for the emergence of Cold War hostilities between the new superpowers in 1946. Musicians concertizing in the United States during this period were suddenly exposed to rapidly shifting diplomatic and political circumstances.

In 1946 the US State Department assumed control of the cultural diplomacy initiatives in South America which were initiated in 1941 by President Roosevelt's Office of the Coordinator of Inter-American Affairs. At first, the State Department continued to encourage leading musicians to concertize and broadcast music in support of its Pan-Americanism policy in the region through its Office of International Broadcasting and Cultural Affairs. As a result, live radio broadcasts to South America by such musicians as Alfredo Antonini, Néstor Mesta Cháyres and John Serry Sr. on CBS's Viva América show continued into the first years of the Cold War era. As the decade came to a close, however, the focal point for American foreign policy shifted toward the superpower rivalry in Europe and such cultural broadcasting to South America was gradually eliminated.

=== 1950s and 1960s ===
Musicians of these decades, especially in jazz and folk music, were influenced by the shadow of nuclear war. Probably the most famous, passionate and influential of all was Bob Dylan, notably in his songs "Masters of War" and "A Hard Rain's a-Gonna Fall" (written just before the Cuban Missile Crisis). In 1965 Barry McGuire's version of P. F. Sloan's apocalyptic "Eve of Destruction" was a number one hit in the United States and elsewhere.

Van Cliburn was a pianist who was celebrated with a ticker tape parade after winning a musical competition in the Soviet Union.

From 1956 through the late 1970s, the US State Department sent its finest jazz musicians to show off music that appealed to youth, to demonstrate racial harmony at home, and to undergird freedom as jazz was a democratic music form, free flowing and improvised. Jazz tours of the Soviet Union were organized in 1956, and lasted through the 1970s.

In addition to jazz, the US State Department also supported the performance of classical music by noteworthy American orchestras and soloists as part of its cultural diplomacy initiatives during the Cold War. During the 1950s, the bass-baritone William Warfield was recruited by the Department of State to perform in six separate European tours which featured productions of the opera Porgy and Bess . In 1961-1962 Howard Hanson's Eastman Philharmonia Orchestra at the Eastman School of Music was selected to represent the nation on an international concert tour which included thirty four cities and sixteen countries in Europe, the Middle East and Russia.

External audio
- You may listen to radio broadcasts of performances by Samuel Adler and members of the Seventh Army Symphony Orchestra from 1956–2006 here on 7aso.org

The United States Seventh Army also played an integral role in supporting cultural diplomacy and strengthening international ties with Europe during the Cold War. The Seventh Army Symphony Orchestra was founded by Corporal Samuel Adler in Stuttgart, Germany as part of an effort by the US Army to demonstrate the common cultural heritage which existed in the United States, its European allies and the conquered nations in Europe during the Cold War period. The orchestra concertized extensively throughout Europe from 1952 until 1961 and performed works from the classical repertoire as well as contemporary compositions from the United States. Listed among the ensemble's earliest "musical ambassadors" were several young conductors including: John Ferritto, James Dixon, Kenneth Schermerhorn and Henry Lewis.

In 1969, Jimi Hendrix performed an instrumental version of "The Star-Spangled Banner" at the Woodstock, distorting the tone while holding up peace symbols.

=== 1970s ===
During the 1970s several conductors of symphonic orchestras added their voices to the growing international opposition to war in general and to nuclear weapons in particular by hosting concerts which raised public awareness of the dangers which the Cold War posed to world peace. These "Concerts for Peace" received international acclaim and were held in various venues including the Japanese city of Hiroshima (1973), the National Cathedral in Washington D.C. (1973), the United Nations General Assembly in New York City (1974) and the Salzburg Music Festival (1976) by such leading musicians as Leonard Bernstein and Seiji Ozawa.

Convinced that "Hiroshima belongs to the world", Ozawa returned to the site of Japan's national peace memorials in both Hiroshima and Nagasaki on multiple occasions to pay homage to the memory of the innocent victims of all wars (1980-2005). These memorial "Concerts for Peace" were conducted in collaboration with several premier international orchestras including: the San Francisco Symphony (1975), the Boston Symphony Orchestra (1978), the New Japan Philharmonic (1982 & 1995), and the Seiji Ozawa Music Academy Orchestra (2005) in a performance of Gabriel Faure's Requiem with a civic chorus of over four hundred voices.

=== Later ===
Many protest songs during the 1980s reflected general unease with escalating tensions between the Soviet Union and the United States brought on by Ronald Reagan's and Margaret Thatcher's hard line against the Soviets. For example, various musical artists wore military uniform-like costumes, as a reflection of the increased feeling of militarism seen in the 1980s. Songs symbolically showed the superpowers going to war, as in the Frankie Goes to Hollywood song "Two Tribes". This song's MTV music video featured caricatures of United States President Ronald Reagan and Soviet General Secretary Konstantin Chernenko in a wrestling match.

Other songs expressed fear of World War III, as in the Sting song, "Russians", with lyrics such as "I don't subscribe to his [Reagan's or Khrushchev's] point of view" (that Reagan would protect Europe, or that Khrushchev would "bury" the West). Other examples include Sly Fox's "Let's go all the way", a song about "going all the way" to nuclear war, The Escape Club's "Wild, Wild West" with its various references to the Cold War and Fischer-Z's album "Red Skies over Paradise". The Genesis song "Land of Confusion" expressed a desire to make some sense out of the world, especially in relation to nuclear war.

A number of punk rock bands from the 1980s attacked Cold War era politics, such as Reagan's and Thatcher's nuclear deterrence brinkmanship. A small sampling includes The Clash, Dead Kennedys, Government Issue, Fear, Suicidal Tendencies, Toxic Reasons, Reagan Youth, etc. Noted punk compilation P.E.A.C.E. included bands from around the world in an attempt to promote international peace. The Scars covered apocalyptic poem "Your Attention Please" by Peter Porter, a radio broadcast announcing nuclear war.

Probably the most famous of the 1980s songs against increased confrontation between the Soviets and the Americans was Nena's "99 Luftballons", which described the events – ostensibly starting with the innocent release of 99 (red) toy balloons – that could lead to a nuclear war.

The Swedish band Imperiet's "Coca Cola Cowboys" is rock song about how the world is divided by two super powers that both claim to represent justice.

Roman Palester, a classical music composer had his works banned and censored in Poland and the Soviet Union, as a result of his work for Radio Free Europe, even though he was thought to be Poland's greatest living composer at the time.

== Theatre ==
=== Musicals and plays ===
- Chess The game of chess was another mode of competition between the two superpowers, which the musical demonstrates.
- Miss Saigon The concluding and final era of the Vietnam War which culminates in the fall of Saigon on April 30, 1975.

== Consumerism ==
Historians debate whether the spread of American-style consumerism to Western Europe (and Japan) was part of the Cold War. Steigerwald reviews the debate by looking at the book Trams or Tailfins? Public and Private Prosperity in Postwar West Germany and the United States (2012) by Jan L. Logemann:

In arguing that West Germany was not "Americanized" after the war, Logemann joins a long debate about American consumer capitalism's power, sweep, and depth of influence in the developed world through the second half of the twentieth century. In pointed contrast to Reinhold Wagnleitner's Coca-colonization and the Cold War (1994) and Victoria de Grazia's Irresistible Empire (2005), Logemann argues that, for all the noisy commentary, pro and con, about postwar Americanization, West Germans shaped their version of the affluent society according to deeply held and distinctly un-American values. Rather than a sweeping homogenization of the developed world, postwar affluence ran along "different paths to consumer modernity" ... Instead of the "consumer-as-citizen" (whom Lizabeth Cohen, in The Consumer's Republic [2003], defined as the main social type in postwar America), West Germans promoted the social consumer who practiced "public consumption," which Logemann defines as "the provision of publicly funded alternatives to private consumer goods and services in areas ranging from housing to transportation or entertainment" (p. 5).

The Freakonomics Radio podcast episode "How the Supermarket Helped America Win the Cold War (Ep. 386)" explores the impact that the supermarket had and has on American culture, including the depth of policy decisions by the US Government that impacted agriculture, as well as serving a propaganda weapon against the Soviet Union. The role of makeup and the consumption of makeup played a role in society and propaganda, and in the conflict between capitalism and communism.

== Sports ==
Cold war tensions between the US and the USSR were the backdrop of sports competitions, especially in ice hockey, basketball, chess and the Olympic Games.

- 1956: 1956 Summer Olympics – USSR-Hungary Blood in the Water match following the Hungarian Revolution and the Soviet invasion of Hungary
- 1969: 1969 World Ice Hockey Championships – USSR-Czechoslovakia following the 1968 Soviet invasion of Czechoslovakia
- 1972: 1972 Summer Olympics – The USSR defeats the United States in men's basketball in a controversial gold medal game
- 1972: Canada–USSR Summit Series – Canada defeats the Soviet Union in this best-on-best eight-game series
- 1972: 1972 World Chess Championship Fischer (USA) – Spassky (USSR) – Bobby Fischer beats Spassky in this championship held in Reykjavik, Iceland
- 1980: Miracle on Ice – The United States upsets the favoured USSR at the 1980 Winter Olympics
- 1980: 1980 Summer Olympics boycott – by the United States
- 1984: 1984 Summer Olympics boycott – by the Soviet Union

== Playground equipment ==
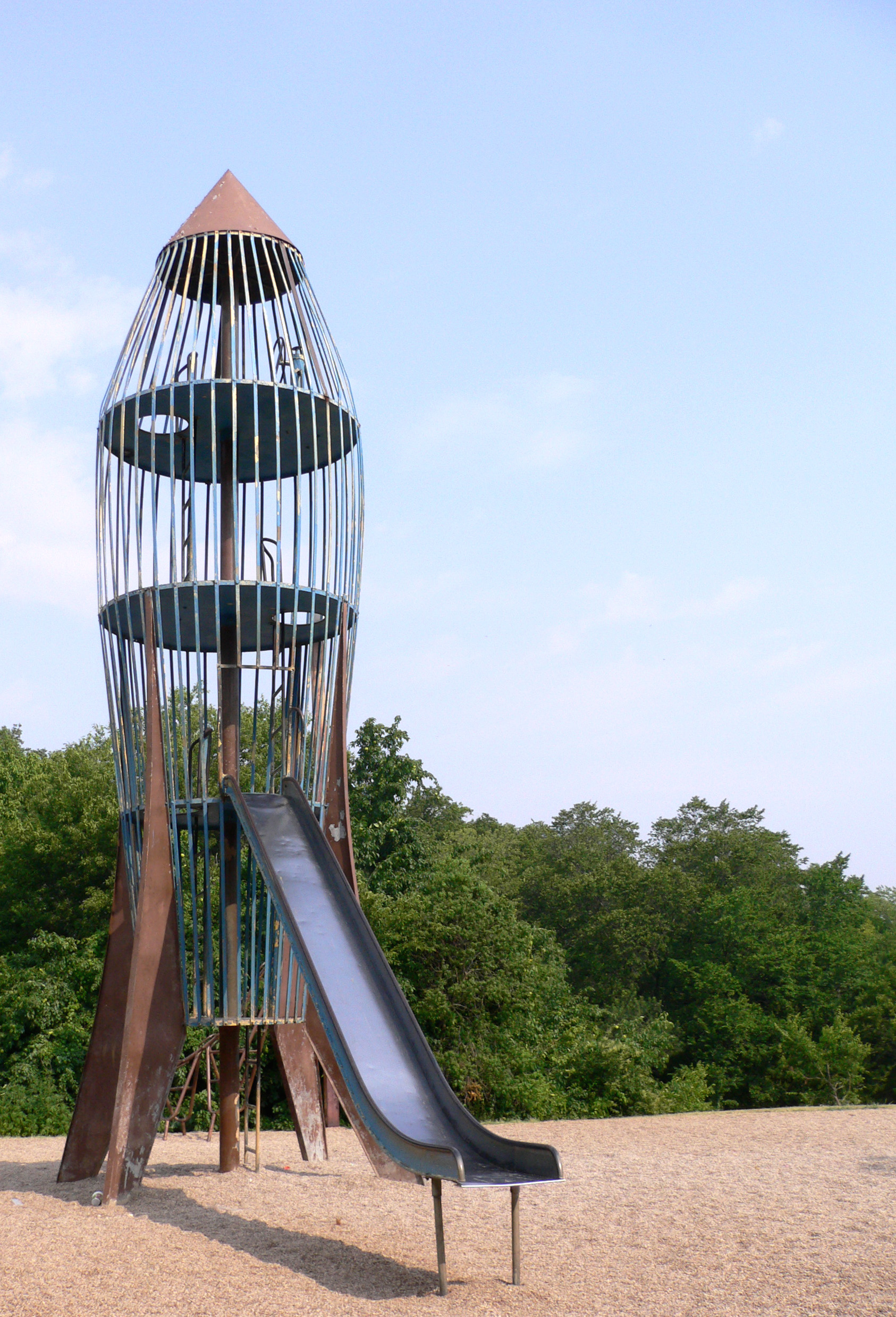
Rocketship slide in Richardson, Texas

Playground equipment constructed during the Cold War was intended to foster children's curiosity and excitement about the Space Race. It was installed in both Communist and non-Communist countries throughout the Cold War.

== Video games ==
Games created during this time period often used a motif of nuclear war, as was the threat at that time. Some of the games listed have been made after the conclusion of the Cold War, but feature a central plot point around the Cold War.

- Firefox
- Missile Command
- Raid over Moscow
- SDI
- Metal Gear Solid 3: Snake Eater
- Metal Gear Solid V: The Phantom Pain
- DEFCON
- World in Conflict
- Crisis in the Kremlin
- Call of Duty: Black Ops
- Call of Duty: Black Ops: Declassified
- Call of Duty: Black Ops II
- Call of Duty: Black Ops Cold War
- Fallout (series)
- Command and Conquer: Red Alert
- Tetris

== Protest culture ==
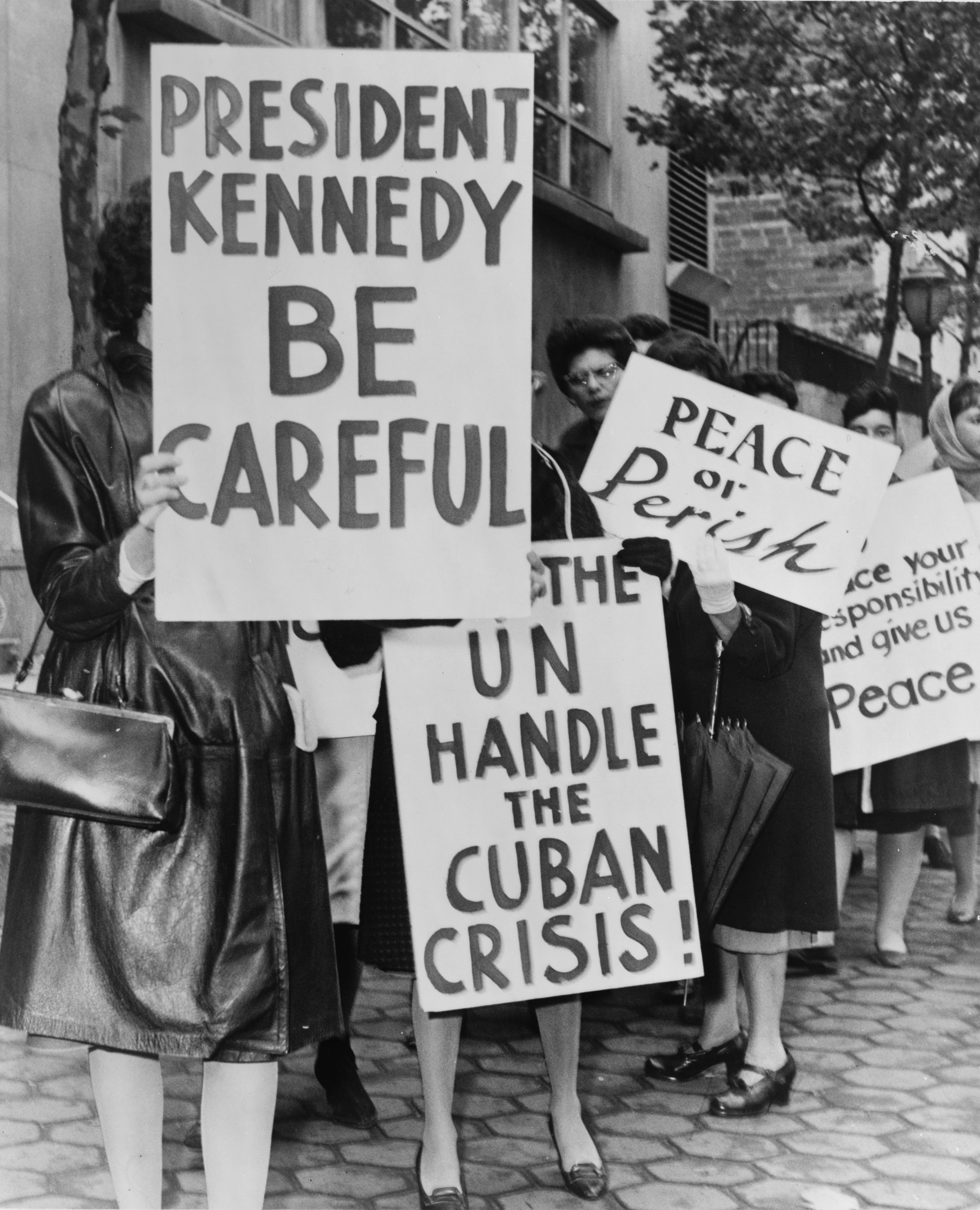
Women Strike for Peace during the Cuban Missile Crisis

Anti-nuclear protests first emerged in the late 1950s and early 1960s. In the United Kingdom, the first Aldermaston March, organised by the Campaign for Nuclear Disarmament, took place in 1958. In 1961, at the height of the Cold War, about 50,000 women brought together by Women Strike for Peace marched in 60 cities in the United States to demonstrate against nuclear weapons. In 1964, Peace Marches in several Australian capital cities featured "Ban the bomb" placards.

In the early 1980s, the revival of the nuclear arms race triggered large protests about nuclear weapons. In October 1981 half a million people took to the streets in several cities in Italy, more than 250,000 people protested in Bonn, 250,000 demonstrated in London, and 100,000 marched in Brussels. The largest anti-nuclear protest was held on June 12, 1982, when one million people demonstrated in New York City against nuclear weapons. In October 1983, nearly 3 million people across western Europe protested nuclear missile deployments and demanded an end to the arms race; the largest crowd of almost one million people assembled in the Hague in the Netherlands. In Britain, 400,000 people participated in what was probably the largest demonstration in British history.

== Other ==
- Barbie—Barbie represented the American way of life, because she was the ultimate consumer.
- New Math was a strong reaction to the launch of Sputnik, by changing the way mathematics was taught to school age children.
- The Kitchen Debate was an impromptu debate (through interpreters) between Vice President Richard Nixon and Soviet Premier Nikita Khrushchev at the opening of the American National Exhibition in Moscow, on July 24, 1959.

== See also ==
- Americanization
- Anti-American sentiment
- American stereotypes
- Cocacolonization
- Cultural imperialism
- Debates over Americanization
- Military globalization
- McDonaldization
- Pax Americana
- Sovietization
- Sovietization of the Baltic states
- Soviet socialist patriotism
- United States in the 1950s
