= Falcon and Snowman =

Falcon and Snowman may refer to:

- The Falcon and the Snowman: A True Story of Friendship and Espionage, a 1979 non-fiction espionage book by the American Journalist, Robert Lindsey
  - The Falcon and the Snowman, a 1985 U.S. spy film adaptation of Lindsey's book
    - The Falcon and the Snowman (album), a 1985 soundtrack album
  - The nicknames Lindsey gave to the real-life people on whose story the book is based:
    - Falcon (Christopher John Boyce), given the nickname due to his interest in falconry
    - Snowman (Andrew Daulton Lee), given the nickname due his drug dealing (white powder)

== See also ==
- The Falcon and the Winter Soldier, a 2021 TV series
