= The Best American Mystery Stories 1997 =

First edition

The Best American Mystery Stories 1997, a volume in The Best American Mystery Stories series, was edited by guest editor Robert B. Parker with Otto Penzler. The series editor chooses about fifty article candidates, from which the guest editor picks 20 or so for publication; the remaining runner-up articles listed in the appendix.

== Mystery Stories included ==
Author	Story	Source
Doug Allyn	"Blind Lemon"	Alfred Hitchcock's Mystery Magazine
James Crumley	"Hot Springs"	Murder for Love
Jeffery Deaver	"The Weekender"	Alfred Hitchcock's Mystery Magazine
Brendan DuBois	"The Dark Snow"	Playboy
Elizabeth George	"The Surprise of His Life"	Women on the Case
Jeremiah Healy	"Eyes That Never Meet"	Unusual Suspects
Melodie Johnson Howe	"Another Tented Evening"	Ellery Queen's Mystery Magazine
Pat Jordan	"The Mark"	Playboy
Jonathan Kellerman	"The Things We Do for Love"	Murder for Love
Andrew Klavan	"Lou Monahan, County Prosecutor"	Guilty as Charged
Elmore Leonard	"Karen Makes Out"	Murder for Love
Michael Malone	"Red Clay"	Murder for Love
Mabel Maney	"Mrs. Feeley is Quite Mad"	Out for More Blood: Tales of Malice and Retaliation by Women
Joyce Carol Oates	"Will You Always Love Me?"	Will You Always Love Me? And Other Stories
George Pelecanos	"When You're Hungry"	Unusual Suspects
S. J. Rozan	"Hoops"	Ellery Queen's Mystery Magazine
Allen Steele	"Doblin's Lecture"	Private Writings
Brad Watson	"Kindred Spirits"	Last Days of the Dog-Men
John Weisman	"There are Monsterim"	Unusual Suspects
Monica Wood	"Unlawful Contact"	Manoa

== Distinguished Mystery Stories of 1996 - listed in appendix ==
Author	Story	Source
Jan Adkins	"Barratry"	Unusual Suspects
Jamie Andree	"Wishing Ball"	Fish Stories 2
Jessica Auerbach	"Police Report"	Unusual Suspects
Nikki Baker	"Backlash"	Night Bites
Ron Carlson	"On Killymoon"	Quarterly West
William J. Caunitz	"Dying Time"	Murder for Love
David Corn	"My Murder"	Unusual Suspects
Dorothy Salisbury Davis	"Miles to Go"	Women on the Case
Jacqueline Freimor	"The B Rules"	Murderous Intent
Ed Gorman	"Famous Blue Raincoat"	Cemetery Dance
James Grady	"Kiss the Sky"	Unusual Suspects
Paul Griner	"Boxes"	Playboy
Rick Hautala	"Hitman"	Night Screams
Edward D. Hoch	"The Problem of the Enormous Owl"	Ellery Queen's Mystery Magazine
Clark Howard	"The Banzai Pipeline"	Ellery Queen's Mystery Magazine
Ronald Kelly	"Exit 85"	Cemetery Dance
Lawrence Starling	"Desire Lines"	Legacies: Stories
John Lutz	"Shock"	Unusual Suspects
Ed McBain	"Running from Legs"	Murder for Love
Marcia Muller	"The Holes in the System"	Ellery Queen's Mystery Magazine
Alice Munro	"The Love of a Good Woman"	The New Yorker
Robert Olmstead	"Rolling Stones"	The Midwesterner
Donald Olson	"The Stone House"	Ellery Queen's Mystery Magazine
Lucius Shepard	"Pizza Man"	Playboy
Julie Smith	"Strangers on a Plane"	Unusual Suspects
Donald E. Westlake	"The Burglar and the Whatsit"	Playboy
Carolyn Wheat	"Cruel and Unusual"	Guilty as Charged
Chet Williamson	"Dr. Joe"	Diagnosis Terminal'

== See also ==
- The Best American Mystery Stories
- The Best American Mystery Stories 2003
- The Best American Mystery Stories 2009
