= American Life (disambiguation) =

American Life is a 2003 album by Madonna

American Life may also refer to:

- The lifestyle and culture of the United States

== Books and broadcasting ==
- An American Life, an autobiography by Ronald Reagan
- AmericanLife TV Network, an American cable television network
- This American Life, a public radio anthology program
- American Life Insurance Company

== Music ==
- "American Life" (song), a song by Madonna from the album of the same title
- "American Life", a song by Primus from the album Sailing the Seas of Cheese
