= St. Thomas Aquinas High School (New Hampshire) =

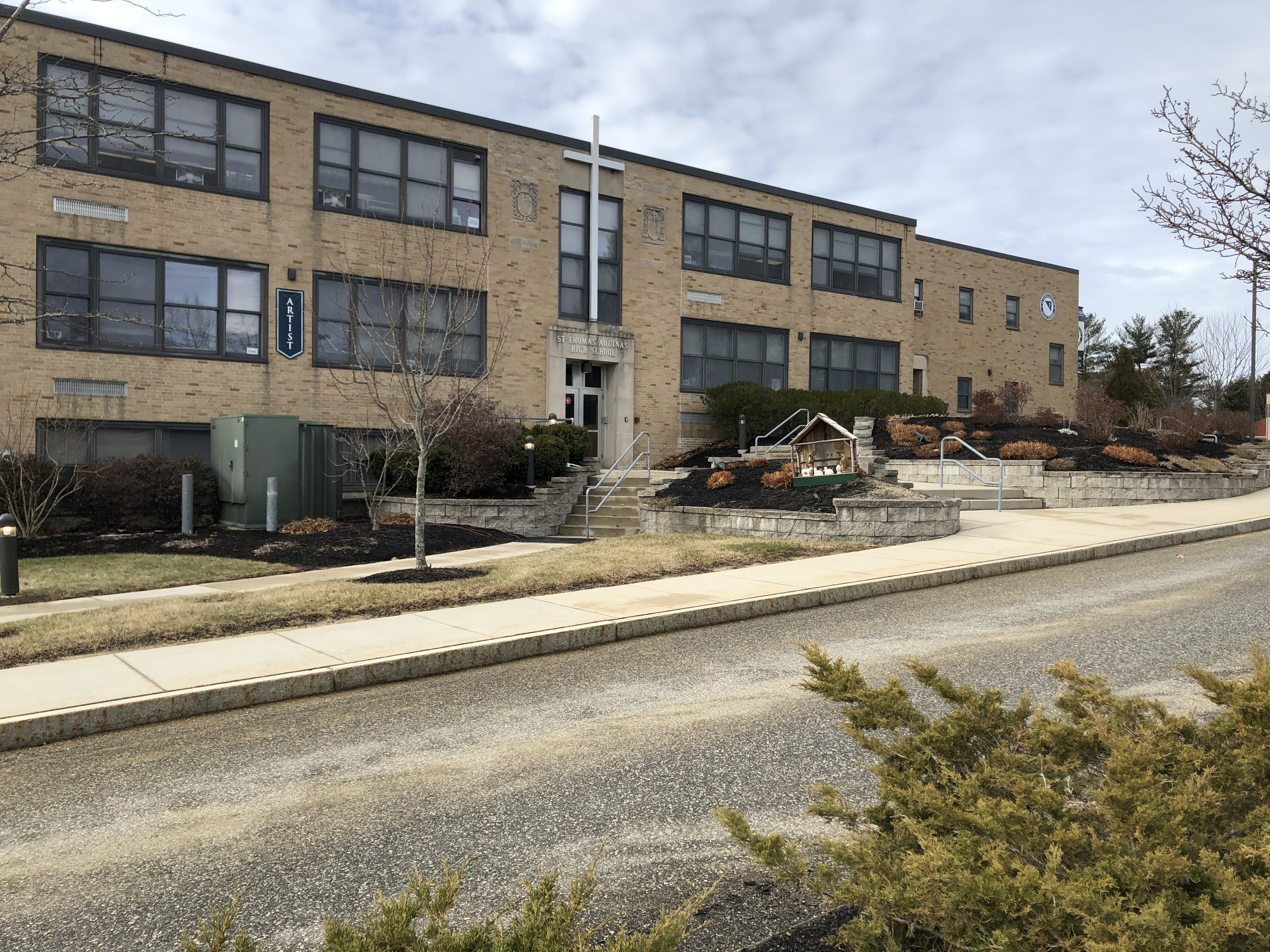

Location
- 197 Dover Point Road; Dover, New Hampshire 03820; United States; 43°9′5″N 70°50′28″W

Information
- Type: Private, coeducational
- Motto: Lux In Tenebris (Light in Darkness)
- Religious affiliation: Roman Catholic
- Patron saint: Thomas Aquinas
- Established: 1960
- Founder: School Sisters of Notre Dame
- Oversight: Diocese of Manchester
- President: Paul C. Marquis
- Principal: Michael Daboul
- Chaplain: Alan Tremblay
- Staff: 19
- Faculty: 33
- Grades: 9–12
- Average class size: 15
- Student to teacher ratio: 12:1
- Campus: Suburban
- Colors: Navy blue & white
- Slogan: Saints Pride
- Athletics conference: NHIAA Division II (ice hockey- Division II, football- Division II)
- Mascot: Bernie Saint Bernard
- Team name: Saints
- Accreditation: New England Association of Schools and Colleges
- Publication: Reflections Magazine
- Tuition: $18,644
- Feeder schools: St. Mary Academy, St. Patrick Academy, Sacred Heart School, Seton Academy
- Alumni: 6,800
- Website: www.stalux.org

St. Thomas Aquinas High School is a coeducational Catholic high school in Dover, New Hampshire, United States, in the Roman Catholic Diocese of Manchester. It has a population of approximately 354 students and 30 faculty members.

== History ==
In August 1959, Matthew F. Brady, Bishop of Manchester, opened the fundraising drive for St. Thomas Aquinas High School. When Bishop Brady suddenly died, Cardinal Richard Cushing of Boston kept his last project alive. Cardinal Cushing greeted the new bishop, Ernest J. Primeau, with the advice, "Go on with St. Thomas Aquinas."

The diocesan co-educational school opened in 1960 with a freshman class only. Serving seventeen parishes in southeastern New Hampshire, the school was staffed by two diocesan priests, seven School Sisters of Notre Dame and one layman. When STA graduated its class of 219 in 1964, the faculty had grown to six priests, twenty-one sisters (requiring a new convent) and four lay teachers.

By the late 1960s, enrollment topped nine hundred students, making St. Thomas Aquinas a Class L power in athletics. A nationwide trend toward declining enrollments, combined with the higher cost of salaries as the number of teaching sisters fell, brought St. Thomas through a series of challenges throughout the 1970s.

Beginning in the mid-1980s through the 1990s St. Thomas Aquinas showed a steady and dramatic increase in enrollment. During this period the school enhanced and expanded the academic and extracurricular programs available to students. The convent, named Notre Dame Hall, was converted to provide additional classroom space and to house the Guidance Department, which includes offices, a library, and a conference area.

School enrollment continued to grow into the mid-2000s, topping more than 700 students in 2007-08. Enrollment declined in subsequent years. St. Thomas’s 2023-24 headcount was half of the school’s peak a decade-and-a-half earlier.

=== Controversy over faculty dismissals ===
In May 2023, the school generated a national controversy when St. Thomas Aquinas president, Paul C. Marquis, declined to renew the contracts of four long-standing teachers. Parents, students, teachers, and alumni stated the teachers’ support of LGBTQ people was the cause for their dismissal, a claim that school and diocesan officials denied. That same month, three additional teachers decided to retire and an eighth faculty member resigned in protest of the firings. As of 2025, the school’s non-discrimination policy for students does not include sexual orientation or gender identity.

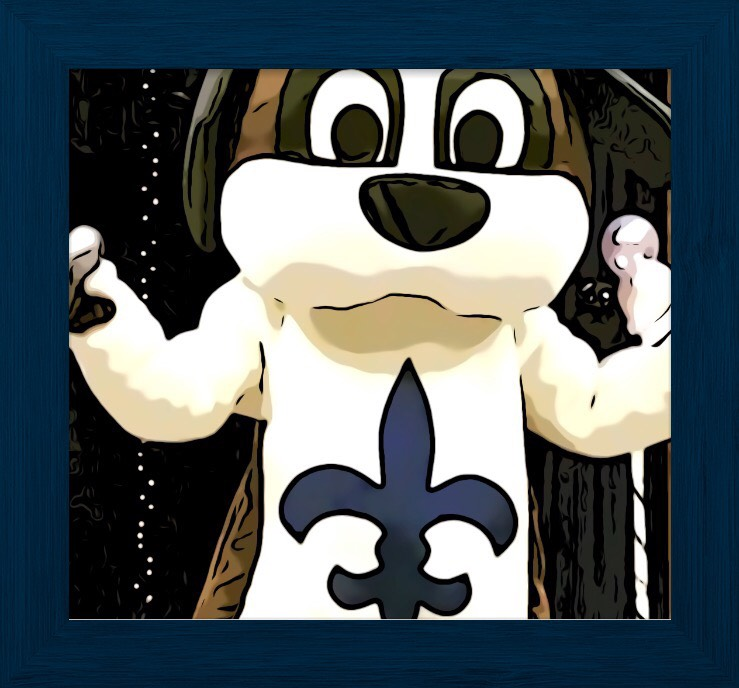
St. Thomas Aquinas High School mascot, Bernie. Dover, NH

== Athletics ==
The school's sports teams compete as the "Saints". Teams of note include football, soccer, swimming and diving, ice hockey, basketball, lacrosse, tennis, track and field, alpine skiing, cross country, and baseball. The Ice Hockey team competes as one of the four Catholic schools in the state in the NHIAA Division II.

In 2011–12, STA was state champion in football (Div IV), girls' swimming, baseball (Div II), and girls' tennis (Div II). The school was a finalist in girls' volleyball and boys' lacrosse. Tennis player Julia Keenan became the first high school athlete in New Hampshire to win four straight individual titles in any sport.

In 2012–13, the girls' volleyball team repeated as state finalists and the girls' tennis team repeated as state champions.

Overall, St. Thomas Aquinas has won 30 state team championships in the last 16 years, along with dozens of individual titles.

== Notable alumni ==
Among St. Thomas Aquinas' graduates are Ron Fortier, comic book and pulp writer best known for his work on The Green Hornet, Brendan DuBois, author of numerous novels including Resurrection Day, Olympic runner Rachel Schneider, and Baltimore Orioles baseball player Ryan McKenna.
