= Federal Correctional Institution, Lompoc I =

Low-security prison in California, US

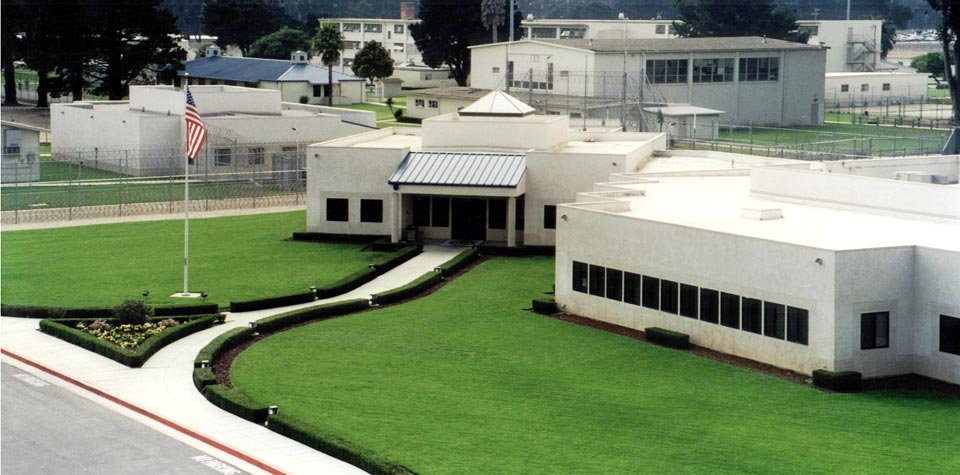
- Interactive map of Federal Correctional Institution, Lompoc I
- Location: Lompoc, Santa Barbara County, California; 34.678364°N 120.497158°W
- Status: Operational
- Security class: Low-security
- Population: 851 (September 2024)
- Managed by: Federal Bureau of Prisons

The Federal Correctional Institution, Lompoc I is a low-security United States federal prison for male inmates in Lompoc, California. It is part of the Lompoc Federal Correctional Complex (FCC Lompoc) and is operated by the Federal Bureau of Prisons, a division of the United States Department of Justice. The complex also includes Federal Correctional Institution, Lompoc II and a minimum-security prison camp.

== Facility ==
The average offender at FCI Lompoc is serving between one and fifteen years for federal drug and or other non-violent offenses. It has four general housing units, two of which offer dormitory and room-type housing. The institution offers a full range of inmate employment, vocational training, education, counseling (both mental health and drug abuse), medical, dental, pre-release preparation, and other self-improvement opportunities.

=== Indoor activities ===
- Beading
- Card-making
- Drawing
- Leatherwork
- Music program and musical instruments
- Painting
- Card tables
- Ellipticals
- Ping pong
- Stair steppers
- Stationary bikes
- Table games

=== Outdoor activities ===
- Basketball
- Bocce ball
- Flag football
- Handball
- Horseshoes
- Racquetball
- Soccer
- Softball
- Tennis (3 courts)
- Track
- Volleyball
- Weights

Hours of operation are 6am to 8pm, excluding counts and meals.

== Notable incidents ==
=== 1980 escape ===
In the late evening hours of January 21, 1980, Christopher Boyce, who was serving a forty-year sentence for spying for the Soviet Union, escaped from FCI Lompoc. With the assistance of fellow inmates, he hid in a drainage hole, then used a makeshift ladder and small tin scissors to cut through a barbed wire perimeter. Boyce was on the run for nineteen months, until U.S. Marshals and FBI Agents captured him on the Olympic Peninsula of western Washington at Port Angeles on August 21, 1981, ending one of the most extensive and complex manhunts in the history of the U.S. Marshals Service.

=== COVID-19 pandemic ===
A deadly COVID-19 outbreak swept through the federal correctional complex in 2020. It included several dozen staff members, including guards.

== Notable inmates (current) ==
Inmate Name	Register Number	Photo	Status	Details
Christopher Faulkner	76501-112		Sentenced to FCI for fraud and tax evasion; scheduled for release in 2030 and is not eligible for parole. Currently at FCI El Reno.	Texas oil-and-gas mogul who was sentenced to 15 years in federal prison for bilking investors out of millions of dollars and concealing money from the IRS.
Chenguang Gong	98305-510		Sentenced to 46 months in federal prison in November 2025 for theft of trade secrets; currently incarcerated at FCI Lompoc I.	Former engineer from San Jose, California; convicted of stealing sensitive missile detection and tracking technology from a Southern California defense contractor and transferring proprietary files for personal use and potential benefit to China.
Abu Khalid Abdul-Latif	40739-086		Serving an 18-year sentence; scheduled for release in 2026. Currently at FCI Sheridan.	Pleaded guilty in 2012 to conspiracy to murder US officers for plotting to attack recruits at a Military Processing Center in Seattle, Washington with grenades and machine guns; co-conspirator Walli Mujahidh received 17 years.
Henry Uliomereyon Jones	46810-112		Scheduled for release in October 2023; now at FCI La Tuna.	Former record company executive; convicted in 2008 of mail fraud, wire fraud, and securities fraud for running a Ponzi scheme that caused 500 investors to lose over $32 million; the story was featured on the CNBC series American Greed.
Samuel Bankman-Fried	37244-510		Transferred from FCI Terminal Island. Serving a 25-year sentence; scheduled for release on December 14, 2044.	Convicted of wire fraud, wire fraud conspiracy, securities fraud, securities fraud conspiracy, and money laundering in relation to the collapse of FTX.

== Notable inmates (former) ==
†Inmates who were released from custody prior to 1982 are not listed on the Bureau of Prisons website.

Inmate Name	Register Number	Status	Details
Jimmy Snowden	Unlisted†	Transferred from Federal Correctional Institution, Texarkana in December 1971 and released in August 1972.	Member of the White Knights of the Ku Klux Klan who became a conspirator and participant in the murders of Chaney, Goodman, and Schwerner in 1964.
Christopher John Boyce	19347-148	Released from custody in 2003 after serving 24 years.	Boyce & Lee were convicted of espionage in 1977 for selling classified information regarding US ciphers and spy satellites to the Soviet Union; they were respectively portrayed by Timothy Hutton and Sean Penn in the 1985 film The Falcon and the Snowman.
Andrew Daulton Lee	19485-148	Released in 1998 after serving 19 years.	Boyce & Lee were convicted of espionage in 1977 for selling classified information regarding US ciphers and spy satellites to the Soviet Union; they were respectively portrayed by Timothy Hutton and Sean Penn in the 1985 film The Falcon and the Snowman.
Bernie Ward	90569-111	Released from custody in 2014; served 6 years.	Former radio host and political commentator; pleaded guilty to distribution of child pornography in 2008 for using the Internet to transmit photographs of children being molested.
Reed Slatkin	24057-112	Released from custody in 2013; served 10 years.	Co-founder of EarthLink and ordained Scientology minister; pleaded guilty in 2002 to fraud, conspiracy and money laundering for perpetrating one of the largest Ponzi schemes in US history.
Chi Mak	29252-112	Was serving a 24-year sentence; released through death on October 31, 2022.	Former engineer for the Boeing aerospace company; convicted in 2007 of conspiracy to commit economic espionage and other charges for stealing restricted information related to the US Space Shuttle program and Delta IV rocket for the Chinese government.
Mossimo Giannulli	77808-112	Was serving a five-month sentence; released from custody on April 2, 2021	American Fashion Designer who pled guilty to one count of conspiracy to commit wire and mail fraud and one count of honest services wire and mail fraud after being investigated as part of Operation Varsity Blues where it was discovered that Mossimo and his wife, Lori Loughlin, paid $500,000 to help secure their two daughters attendance at University of Southern California.
Changpeng Zhao	88087-510	Was serving a four-month sentence; released from custody on September 29, 2024	Co-founder and former CEO of Binance, the world's largest cryptocurrency exchange by trading volume as of November 2023. He resigned as the CEO in November 2023 after pleading guilty to a money laundering charge in the United States and was sentenced to four months in prison in April 2024.

== See also ==
- Federal Bureau of Prisons
- List of U.S. federal prisons
- Incarceration in the United States
