= The Best American Mystery and Suspense =

Crime fiction anthology

The Best American Mystery and Suspense is an annual anthology of North American mystery and thriller stories. Prior to 2021, its title was The Best American Mystery Stories and it was published by Houghton Mifflin through the year 2017. It has been part of The Best American Series since 1997, it is published by Mariner Books, an imprint of HarperCollins.

Works for each edition are selected like the other The Best American Series titles, whereby a series editor chooses about 50 candidates from which a guest editor picks about 20 for publication. Runners-up are listed in the appendix. The editor of the series during 1997–2020, Otto Penzler, defined eligible mystery stories as "any work of fiction in which a crime or the threat of a crime is central to the theme or plot" and only considered those that had been written by an American or Canadian and published for the first time during the previous calendar year in an American or Canadian publication.

== Series editors ==
- Otto Penzler (1997–2020)
- Steph Cha (2021–)

== Guest editors ==
- 1997: Robert B. Parker
- 1998: Sue Grafton
- 1999: Ed McBain
- 2000: Donald Westlake
- 2001: Lawrence Block
- 2002: James Ellroy
- 2003: Michael Connelly
- 2004: Nelson DeMille
- 2005: Joyce Carol Oates
- 2006: Scott Turow
- 2007: Carl Hiaasen
- 2008: George Pelecanos
- 2009: Jeffery Deaver
- 2010: Lee Child
- 2011: Harlan Coben
- 2012: Robert Crais
- 2013: Lisa Scottoline
- 2014: Laura Lippman
- 2015: James Patterson
- 2016: Elizabeth George
- 2017: John Sandford
- 2018: Louise Penny
- 2019: Jonathan Lethem
- 2020: C. J. Box
- 2021: Alafair Burke
- 2022: Jess Walter
- 2023: Lisa Unger
- 2024: SA Cosby
- 2025: Don Winslow
- 2026: Megan Abbott

== See also ==
- The Best American Mystery Stories 1997
- The Best American Mystery Stories 2003
- The Best American Mystery Stories 2009
