= Bernie Ward =

American former radio personality (born 1951)

- Born: Bernard Vincent Ward; April 5, 1951 (age 75); San Francisco, California, U.S.
- Years active: 1985-2007
- Presenting career
- Style: Talk show
- Country: United States

Bernard Vincent Ward (born April 5, 1951) is an American former radio personality whose career ran from 1985 to 2007. Formerly a radio talk show host with KGO 810 AM in San Francisco, California, Ward, once billed by KGO as "The Lion of the Left" and "unabashedly liberal," was the host of the daily news talk program, The Bernie Ward Show, and the three-hour program, GodTalk, on Sunday mornings.

In December 2007, Ward was dismissed from KGO following his federal grand jury child pornography indictment. Subsequently, in a plea bargain with federal prosecutors, Ward admitted to a single felony charge of online distribution of child pornography and signed an admission of distributing between 15 and 150 images via email. He consequently served a six-year prison sentence, and was released in 2014.

== Biography ==
Bernie Ward was born in San Francisco, California, where he attended Holy Name Grammar School, St. Ignatius High School, and the University of San Francisco. He taught for one year (1973–1974) at St. Victor Catholic elementary school in San Jose, California. He then studied for three years at the Franciscan School of Theology in Berkeley, obtaining a Theology degree in 1977. He was ordained to the Catholic priesthood with the Missionaries of the Precious Blood the same year, but left the priesthood after two years.

Ward later taught theology at Cardinal Newman High School in Santa Rosa, California and its sister school, Ursuline High School. At Ursuline in 1978, allegations of Ward's sexual misconduct first began to surface. Ward also taught at Bellarmine College Preparatory in San Jose, California. In 1981, he relocated to Washington, D.C. where he taught marriage and sex education at the Georgetown Preparatory School, a private Jesuit Roman Catholic high school, while his wife attended medical school. Ward later worked for then-Representative Barbara Boxer from 1982 to 1985.

=== Radio talk show host ===
Ward's employment at KGO (AM) began in 1985 where he served as a fill-in talk show host, a general-assignment reporter, and later as a political talk show host starting in 1992. As a reporter, where Jerry Jay Carroll of the San Francisco Chronicle noted on October 25, 1995, that it had become a ritual for the mayor at that time, Art Agnos, to denounce him for lies at the beginning of every news conference. Ward also went on to host "God Talk," a show on religion and related topics.

Briefly in 1996, Ward's talk show was nationally syndicated until his ratings declined. His show's ratings began to improve in 1997 in Ward's core demographic group (women ages 25 to 54) as a result of his more lenient views on topics such as child-rearing and ethics. On October 5, 1997, a rumor that KGO was discontinuing Ward's contract effective at the end of the month was published by the San Francisco Chronicle. In protest, supporters of his show flooded the KGO studios with canned food donations, continuing a seven-year Thanksgiving fundraising drive started by Ward that had netted more than $1 million in donations shared by the St. Anthony Foundation and two other area charities. The protest culminated in a noontime rally staged in front of the KGO studios. KGO management reversed their decision and renewed Ward's contract.

On December 31, 2007, Ward was fired from KGO because of his indictment on child pornography charges.

=== Child pornography conviction ===
On September 20, 2007, Ward was indicted by a grand jury on two federal counts of Attempting to Distribute and one count of Receiving child pornography via the Internet from December 2004 to January 2005. The police investigation of Ward originated with a complaint from a Stanislaus County woman who was posing online as a dominatrix under the screenname "Sexfairy2005" and who had engaged in online chats with Ward. According to the police report, Ward sent pornographic images of children to the chat partner, which caused her to contact police. The police began collecting evidence with her help and continued chat sessions with Ward. In the chat logs, Ward also described sexual activity with his own children. Ward and his children both later told investigators that none of the activities described in the chats ever actually occurred, Ward contending it was just sexual fantasy talk.

In a statement, Ward's attorney did not dispute engaging in the chats or transmitting the photos, but instead claimed Ward was role-playing with the dominatrix in part for research on a book about hypocrisy in America. Federal investigators could find no evidence that Ward was working on such a book. Ward's attorney claimed that federal authorities found no illegal images on his computer, which they seized in early 2005. However, after police obtained a search warrant for Ward's online account, they found about 100 images of child pornography in his AOL email account on AOL's servers which had been opened and forwarded, with sexual activity involving children.

On May 8, 2008, Ward announced an agreement to plead guilty to one count of Distribution of Child Pornography in exchange for the dropping of two additional counts of Possession and Distribution. In his plea agreement, Ward admits that he transmitted child pornography "between 15 and 150 times." Under federal statute, Ward could have been sentenced to between five and 20 years in prison. The Department of Justice requested he be sentenced to nine years in prison.

On August 28, 2008, Judge Vaughn Walker sentenced Ward to seven years and three months in federal prison. Judge Walker agreed to Ward's request that he be allowed to serve his time in the Federal Correctional Institution, Lompoc, to which the U.S. Attorney raised no objection. Judge Walker commented that Ward's alleged sexual misconduct while serving as a priest may go to character, but that the events happened too long ago to be relevant to his sentencing decision. He also said that he was not convinced sending Ward to prison is the best way to deal with an individual with such problems and that "very little good has come out of all this." Ward told Judge Walker that he took full responsibility for his actions and said, "I regret my actions, the harm they caused my family, my friends, and this community."

With good behavior, Ward's sentence of 87 months was reduced by 15 percent, making him eligible for Supervised Release on December 19, 2014; there is no parole in the Federal system. On release from prison California's Megan's Law designated Ward a registered sex offender. For the remainder of his life Ward must in-person notify and register with local law enforcement about his residing or staying in its jurisdiction and locale.

Ward served his sentence at the Federal Correctional Institution, Lompoc, a low-security federal prison in California. He was released on December 19, 2014.

== Personal beliefs ==
=== Religion ===
On March 16, 1996, Ward discussed the confrontational tactics of the group ACT UP at a mosque, describing the group as a "collection of non-partisan individuals committed to direct action to end AIDS." He stated that "homosexuals had a good cause to make (against the Catholic Church)," and claimed that the church encouraged homophobia and homophobic actions. The church denied this, stating that they did not encourage homophobia or resistance against homosexuals, but merely taught that homosexual sex, because it is outside a marriage between a man and a woman, was immoral.

On December 9, 1996, Ward stated that Christianity was "morally superior" to Judaism because it was based on unconditional forgiveness. He offered apologies on his radio show on December 17 and again on the following day, the first being dismissed by the Jewish Community Relations Council and the second being accepted. Ward insisted that he did not have a problem with any individual religion, only with fundamentalists. He later compared fundamentalist Orthodox Judaism with Nazism on September 12, 2001, but offered an apology the following day.

=== Iraq war ===
On September 30, 2002, Ward appeared on CNN with Wolf Blitzer and discussed possible military action against Iraq. He commented about Saddam Hussein: "Hussein has not shown any threat to anyone" and that the "Kurds were prospering very well in the north even as al-Qaeda has used some of their connections with the Kurds."

=== Causes ===
He led a pledge drive for Thanksgiving Charities every year, which supported four charities in the San Francisco Bay Area: Sacred Heart Community Services in San Jose, St. Anthony's Foundation in San Francisco, St. Vincent De Paul dining room in Oakland, and Fresh Start in Walnut Creek. The charity drive began in the late 1980s and raised over $4 million in the following decades. Ward was also a participant in the KGO leukemia cure-a-thon, which has raised over $13 million for research into leukemia and lymphoma causes.

== Recognition ==
Ward received the Scripps Howard Award for Excellence in Journalism for his investigative journalism in a 10-part series, Heaven Help Us, which explored allegations of financial and sexual misconduct of the Roman Catholic Archdiocese of San Francisco. He has also won numerous national awards, such as an Associated Press award for coverage of the 1992 Los Angeles riots.
