= John Peyton Cooke =

American novelist

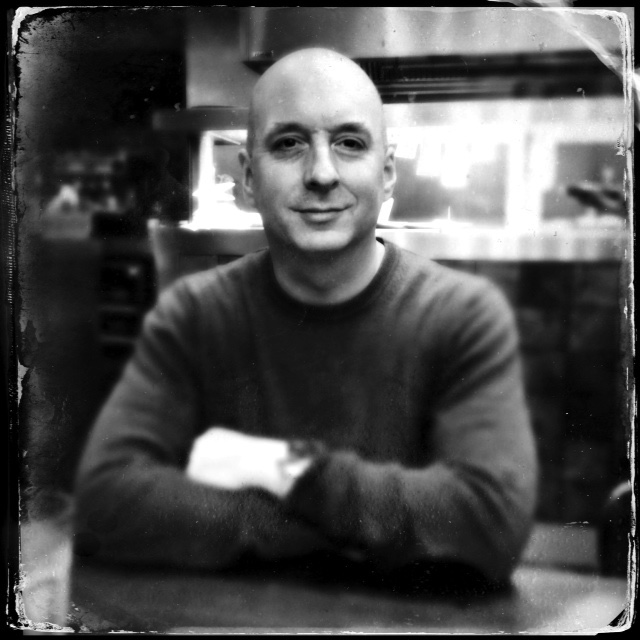
- Cooke in London, 2016
- Born: John Peyton Cooke; March 7, 1967 (age 59); Amarillo, Texas, U.S.
- Occupation: Novelist
- Writing career
- Genre: Crime fiction
- Notable works: Out for Blood; Torsos; The Chimney Sweeper; The Rape of Ganymede; The Fall of Lucifer
- Website: Official website

John Peyton Cooke (born March 7, 1967) is an American novelist. He is most notable as a short story writer known for thrillers, often with gay male protagonists and including themes of male homosexuality and psychological suspense.

== Reviews ==
His novel Torsos, a fictionalized account of the Cleveland Torso Murderer, was a finalist for the Lambda Literary Award for Best Gay Men's Mystery for 1993, and was noted by Marilyn Stasio in The New York Times Book Review for its atmospheric depiction of Cleveland, Ohio, during the Great Depression. His short story "After You’ve Gone" was selected for The Best American Mystery Stories 2003, edited by Michael Connelly and Otto Penzler.

Cooke's 1991 gay vampire novel Out for Blood, originally published by Avon Books, was reprinted in 2019 by Valancourt Books (also issued in audiobook) and Cooke was interviewed about his novel by the audiobook's narrator Sean C. Duregger on his podcast Audiobooks from Hell.

== Awards and honors ==
- 1994 finalist for Best Gay Men's Mystery, 6th Lambda Literary Awards
- 2003 The Best American Mystery Stories 2003

== Publications ==
=== Books ===
- The Lake (1989), Avon Books, New York ISBN 9780380757688
- Out for Blood (1991), Avon Books, New York ISBN 9781948405553
- Torso (1993), Headline Books, London ISBN 074720814X.
- Torsos (1994), The Mysterious Press/Warner Books, New York ISBN 9780892965229
- Torsos (1994), translated into Spanish by María del Mar Moya, Planeta, Barcelona ISBN 84-08-01157-X
- The Chimney Sweeper (1994), Headline Books, London ISBN 0747211582
- The Chimney Sweeper (1995), The Mysterious Press/Warner Books, New York ISBN 9780892965236
- Haven (1996), The Mysterious Press/Warner Books, New York ISBN 9780892966103
- The Rape of Ganymede (2008), Éditions Cuir Noir, Toronto ISBN 9780981004716
- The Fall of Lucifer (2008), Éditions Cuir Noir, Toronto ISBN 9780981004709
- After You’ve Gone and Other Outré Tales (2011), Éditions Cuir Noir, London ISBN 9780981004785
- Out for Blood (2019), Valancourt Books, Richmond, Virginia ISBN 9781948405553

=== Short fiction ===
- ”The Cat’s Meow”, in Eldritch Tales, No. 12, 1986.
- ”Sweet Chariot” (with Catherine Cooke), Space and Time, No. 72, Summer 1987.
- ”A Doll’s Tale”, in Weird Tales, No. 295, Winter 1989/90.
- ”The Strawberry Man”, in Embracing the Dark, edited by Eric Garber, Alyson Books, Boston, 1991. ISBN 1555831672
- ”The Naked Tooth”, in Christopher Street, No. 185, August 17, 1992.
- ”Spoiled Rotten”, in Eldritch Tales, No. 28, 1993.
- ”Telling Tales”, in The Mystery Zone, 1995.
- ”The Penitent”, in Dark Love, edited by Nancy A. Collins, Edward E. Kramer, and Martin H. Greenberg, Roc Books, 1995. ISBN 0451454723
- ”After You’ve Gone”, in Stranger: Dark Tales of Eerie Encounters, edited by Michelle Slung, Harper Perennial, New York, 2002. ISBN 0739424335 Reprinted in The Best American Mystery Stories 2003, edited by Otto Penzler and Michael Connelly, Houghton Mifflin, Boston, 2003. ISBN 9780618329656
- ”Serostatus”, in The Magazine of Fantasy & Science Fiction, No. 624, January 2004.
- ”Let’s Make a Face”, in The Valancourt Book of Horror Stories, Vol. 4, edited by James D. Jenkins & Ryan Cagle, Valancourt Books, 2020. ISBN 9781948405799
- ”The Man Who Hated Foley”, in The Pulp Horror Book of Phobias, Vol. II, edited by M. J. Sydney, Lycan Valley Press, 2020. ISBN 9781645629788
- ”The Open House”, in Night Terrors, Vol. 21, Scare Street, 2022. ASIN B0B9T99R1H
- ”Electric Pink”, in Pink Triangle Rhapsody, Lycan Valley Press, 2022.

== Other ==
- Cooke, John Peyton (1989). The Lake. Avon Books, New York ISBN 9780380757688
- Cooke, John Peyton (1991). Out for Blood. Avon Books, New York ISBN 9781948405553.
- Cooke, John Peyton (2013). Out for Blood. Reprinted by Éditions Cuir Noir, London. ISBN 9780981004730.
- Cooke, John Peyton (2019). Out for Blood. Reprinted by Valancourt Books, Richmond, Virginia ISBN 9781948405553
- Cooke, John Peyton (1993). Torso. Headline, London. ISBN 1873736002.
- Cooke, John Peyton (1994). Torsos. The Mysterious Press/Warner Books, New York. ISBN 9780747208143.
- Cooke, John Peyton (1994). Torsos. Translated into Spanish by María del Mar Moya. Planeta, Barcelona. ISBN 84-08-01157-X.
- Cooke, John Peyton (1994). The Chimney Sweeper. Headline, London. ISBN 0747211582.
- Cooke, John Peyton (1995). The Chimney Sweeper. The Mysterious Press/Warner Books, New York. ISBN 9780892965236.
- Cooke, John Peyton (1996). Haven. The Mysterious Press/Warner Books, New York. ISBN 9780892966103.
- Cooke, John Peyton (2008). The Rape of Ganymede. Éditions Cuir Noir, Toronto. ISBN 9780981004716.
- Cooke, John Peyton (2008). The Fall of Lucifer. Éditions Cuir Noir, Toronto ISBN 9780981004709
- Cooke, John Peyton (2011). After You’ve Gone and Other Outré Tales. Éditions Cuir Noir, London ISBN 9780981004785

== Personal life ==
He was born in Amarillo, Texas, and grew up in Laramie, Wyoming. He has also lived in New York City, Toronto, London, and currently lives in Los Angeles.
