= The Best American Mystery Stories 2003 =

Mystery short stories

Published by Mariner Books

The Best American Mystery Stories 2003, a volume in The Best American Mystery Stories series, was edited by Otto Penzler and by guest editor Michael Connelly.

== Short Stories included ==
Author	Story	Where story previously appeared
Doug Allyn	"The Jukebox King"	Alfred Hitchcock's Mystery Magazine
Christopher Chambers	"Aardvark to Aztec"	Washington Square
Christopher Cook	"The Pickpocket"	Measures of Poison
John Peyton Cooke	"After You've Gone"	Stranger: Dark Tales of Eerie Encounters
James Crumley	"Hostages"	Measures of Poison
O'Neil De Noux	"Death on Denial"	Flesh and Blood: Dark Desires
Pete Dexter	"The Jeweler"	Esquire
Tyler Dilts	"Thug: Signification and the (De) Construction of Self"	Puerto del Sol
Mike Doogan	"War Can Be Murder"	The Mysterious North
Brendan DuBois	"Richard's Children"	Much Ado About Murder
Elmore Leonard	"When the Women Come Out to Dance"	When the Women Come Out to Dance
Robert McKee	"The Confession"	Eureka Literary Magazine
Walter Mosley	"Lavender"	Six Easy Pieces
Joyce Carol Oates	"The Skull"	Harper's Magazine
George P. Pelecanos	"The Dead Their Eyes Implore Us"	Measures of Poison
Scott Phillips	"Sockdolager"	Measures of Poison
Daniel Stashower	"The Adventure of the Agitated Actress"	Murder, My Dear Watson
Hannah Tinti	"Home Sweet Home"	Epoch
Scott Wolven	"Controlled Burn"	Harpur Palate
Monica Wood	"That One Autumn"	Glimmer Train Stories

== Other distinguished mystery stories of 2002 ==
Other distinguished mystery stories of 2002 honored in the volume included Derek Alger's "Remembering the Rain" (The Literary Review), Dwight Allen's "End of the Steam Age" (Greensboro Review), Lawrence Block's "The Ehrengraf Reverse" (The Mighty Johns), C. M. Chan's "The Body in the Boot" (Alfred Hitchcock's Mystery Magazine), William Chretien's "The Worried Wife" (Futures), Robert Coover's "The Invisible Man" (Playboy), Bentley Dadmun's "Sisters" (Alfred Hitchcock's Mystery Magazine), Edmund X. Dejesus's "Troublemaker" (Alfred Hitchcock's Mystery Magazine), Justin Gustainis's "Bargain" (Futures), Colin Harrison's "Good Seats" (The Mighty Johns), Adrianne Harun's "Lost in the War of the Beautiful Lads" (The Sun), Joe Helgerson's "The Case of the Floating Pearl Diver" (Alfred Hitchcock's Mystery Magazine), Tabitha King's "The Women's Room" (Stranger: Dark Tales of Eerie Encounters), Linda Lavid's "The Accident" (Southern Cross Review), Dennis Lehane's "Gone Down to Corpus" (The Mighty Johns), Laird Long's "Sioux City Express" (HandHeldCrime), Mike Lupica's "No Thing" (The Mighty Johns), Robert Garner McBrearty's "Transformations" (The Green Hills Literary Lantern), Peter Nathaniel Malae's "Turning Point" (The Cimarron Review), Ray Nayler's "The Bat House" (Ellery Queen's Mystery Magazine), Carol O'Connell's "The Arcane Receiver" (The Mighty Johns), Kevin Stewart's "Red Dog" (Shenandoah), Marcia Talley's "Too Many Cooks" (Much Ado About Murder), Don Webb's "Our Novel" (The Magazine of Fantasy & Science Fiction), John Weisman's "A Day in the Country" (Playboy), Julie Weston's "Hunter Moon" (River Styx), and David Zeltserman's "More Than a Scam" (Mysterical Bizland).
