= Warday =

1984 novel by Whitley Strieber and James Kunetka

- 1984 hardback edition
- Author: Whitley Strieber and James Kunetka
- Language: English
- Genre: Nuclear war
- Publisher: Holt, Rinehart and Winston
- Publication date: 1984
- Publication place: United States
- Media type: Print (Hardback & Paperback)
- Pages: 374 pp
- ISBN: 0-03-070731-5
- OCLC: 10046613
- Dewey Decimal: 813/.54 19
- LC Class: PS3569.T6955 W3 1984

Warday is a novel by Whitley Strieber and James Kunetka, first published in 1984. It is a fictional account of the authors travelling across the U.S. five years after a limited nuclear attack in order to assess how the nation has changed after the war. The novel takes the form of a first-person narrative research article and includes government documents, interviews with survivors and aid workers, and present-tense narration.

A film version of the novel was planned, to be produced by Keith Barish and directed by Greek film director Costa-Gavras. The film was never made.

== Plot ==
Strieber is in New York City in October 1988 when it is attacked by Soviet nuclear weapons. He experiences the initial blast while riding a bus, and witnesses the flooding of the subway system by a tsunami in the wake of a nuclear detonation at sea. Strieber is reunited with his family at his son's school and shelters there, but experiences radiation sickness. Upon his recovery, he and his family leave New York for San Antonio which they soon discover was destroyed as well. They eventually settle in Dallas, where he becomes a farmer.

Five years later, Strieber and Kunetka decide to document the effects of Warday on the United States; they travel first through devastated southeast and southwest Texas. They then visit the new nation-state of Aztlan in the former American Southwest, and conduct interviews with its foreign minister and citizens. They then conduct interviews while trying to evade the omnipresent police in Los Angeles, California. California, physically untouched by the attack, has become a self-governing, authoritarian police state which treats outsiders as "illegal immigrants." In San Francisco, they reunite with an old friend of Strieber's, Chelsea Quinn Yarbro, but are then captured, arrested, and sentenced to years of hard labor in prison.

En route to prison they escape by train and continue their interviews across the Midwest, taking refuge periodically from the highly-radioactive dust storms now ubiquitous in the Midwest (created by the nuclear bombing of the Dakotas). After visiting Chicago, they continue east to Pennsylvania and into what remains of New York City, where Strieber, overcome with emotion, returns to his old apartment in the very dangerous ruins of Manhattan. The book ends with Strieber and Kunetka back in Texas facing an uncertain future.

=== The war ===
The former undersecretary of defense tells Strieber that the United States was deploying Spiderweb, an advanced anti-ballistic missile system which could use an orbiting particle beam to destroy both land and submarine launched missiles. To prevent its deployment, the Soviets destroyed the Space Shuttle Enterprise with a hunter-killer satellite. The Soviets then detonated a set of six large nuclear warheads in space above the United States and Canada, causing a massive electromagnetic pulse that crippled electronics across the country. The Soviets then launched a limited first strike using satellites to deploy their warheads. In response, the U.S. president, aboard Boeing E-4 NEACP, authorized a counterattack, destroying Moscow, Leningrad, Sevastopol, and the capitals of the Soviet Republics. Shortly afterwards, the NEACP, crippled by the electromagnetic pulse, crash-landed in North Carolina, killing the president but leaving other survivors including the Undersecretary.

The "limited attack" by the Soviets destroyed Washington, D.C., San Antonio, and most of Long Island, and ICBM missile fields and major air bases in North Dakota, South Dakota, Montana, and Wyoming, killing about seven million people. The subsequent firestorms and fallout destroyed most of Brooklyn, Queens, Baltimore, and most of southwest Texas. The Soviet Navy also launched nuclear attacks that destroyed about 90 percent of the United States Navy, suffering heavy losses in return. The duration of the war was 36 minutes.

=== Post-war United States ===
Manhattan and the remaining undamaged boroughs are evacuated, cordoned off, and eventually fall into ruin, without water, electrical, or transit systems. Water in New Jersey is contaminated by runoff from damaged petrochemical industries. Philadelphia and Houston are evacuated because of heavy fallout from the D.C. and San Antonio bombings. Radioactive dusting of the Midwest and Central Plains causes a famine that kills millions. Less than a year after the war, a new strain of influenza known as the Cincinnati Flu quickly reached epidemic levels, killing 21 million throughout the United States and millions more worldwide. The remaining U.S. citizens remain in danger from radiation poisoning and from a new incurable disease of unknown origin, Non-Specific Sclerosing Disease. There is also report of post-war infants and toddlers showing signs of 'HIS': Hyper-Intelligent Syndrome.

Soon there is no longer a single United States; California and Texas form de facto independent nations, with autonomous military forces and currencies. The now-nearly-powerless federal government is re-established in Los Angeles.

==== West Coast ====
Having suffered no direct attacks or fallout, California has recovered from the EMP to a prewar standard of living, with heavy Japanese and British investment and influence. Fearful that millions of refugees from the rest of the U.S. would deluge the state and greatly damage its enviable standard of living, California closed off its borders, suspended habeas corpus, and became overtly authoritarian in both outlook and operation. Suspected illegal immigrants are immediately imprisoned or deported, or even executed. Other regions, such as the Pacific Northwest and the Deep South that also escaped the worst of Warday, have adopted similar but less draconian measures. Though it hosts the president and remnants of the federal government, California in practice is a sovereign nation, hosting de facto embassies of the world's surviving powers in Sacramento.

==== Aztlan ====
A new Hispanic/Native American nation named Aztlan emerges through secession. Its government claims all of the area from West Texas to the California border up to Nevada, has forcibly expelled almost all white residents, and has established libertarian socialist country that grants total autonomy to the Native American tribes within its borders. It welcomes Mexican immigrants and announces plans to form a Hispanic nation along the Mexican border that includes California, Arizona, New Mexico, and Texas west of the Pecos. The Japanese provide economic aid to Aztlan in exchange for exploitation of natural resources such as soy and uranium, and there is evidence that in reality, Aztlan has become a client state of Japan. Aztlan is recognized by most nations in Africa and Latin America, but the governor of Texas plans to retake Aztlan by force.

=== Economy, culture, and society ===
The EMP event destroyed most bank accounts, 401(k) plans, pension funds, financial records, the stock market, the credit system and other electronically stored assets in Canada and the former United States. Money in the former United States had undergone a rapid deflation and the economy reverted to a Gold Dollar system. Most electronic machinery and devices are also irretrievably damaged. Oil falls to 11 cents a barrel, while many other nations have called in loans and debts owed them by the United States.

The Catholic and Episcopal churches reunite, and assisted suicide in the face of painful terminal illness is accepted and sanctioned by religious leaders including the Holy See. Wicca, "alternative" medicine, and organic medicine become common. Many Americans become Destructuralists, anarchists, and Luddites, rejecting civic authority and returning to a primitive lifestyle. Damaged communication systems mean that the American people remain isolated, and many believe that the USSR had won the war.

Foreign companies move into the unaffected regions of the U.S. to sell electronics, machinery, and investments, while exploiting it for natural resources, leading to fears that the United States will be reduced to Third World dependency. In spite of this, most Americans believe that the United States will recover its status as a great power.

=== The USSR ===
Through their interviews Strieber and Kunetka hear many reports and rumors on the current state of the Soviet Union. It is certain that the USSR collapsed, with almost half its population killed on Warday or dead by the time the authors are writing the book five years later. Yet whether the Soviet premier and Politburo survived remains a mystery. Some former Soviet republics (such as the "Kingdom of Azerbaijan" as well as a White Russian enclave) have declared themselves independent states. It has been reported, though unconfirmed, that mysterious "purple bombs" destroyed Ukraine's wheat fields.

Although Soviet Army units stationed in the Warsaw Pact nations disbanded due to lack of orders or direction from Moscow, rogue Soviet submarines still roam the Arctic, raiding Alaskan and Canadian coastal towns for supplies. These are actively hunted by the Royal Navy, and their remaining warheads are still targeted on the United States, with it being noted in one case that a submarine was merely a minute from destroying the West Coast before its destruction by the Royal Navy.

=== The rest of the world ===
Prior to the conflict between the U.S. and the Soviets, the United Kingdom, France, and West Germany signed a secret "Treaty of Coventry", under which they would seize U.S. military facilities in their respective countries, in the event of a sudden nuclear war between the U.S. and the Soviets. These nations informed the Soviets of their intent to stay neutral, thus being spared from invasion and nuclear attack, a decision one character describes as likely responsible for Humanity not going extinct amidst a total nuclear war.

In the vacuum left by the destruction of the Soviets and the U.S., the United Kingdom and Japan have become superpowers. West Germany and East Germany have reunited, the United States is dependent on the British and Japan for aid and financial support, and many Americans hope to emigrate to the United Kingdom. An intergovernmental aid organization called "British Relief", with backing from British military units stationed in the United States, has a large role in governing the country and occupies some areas—in effect, a restoration of British America, but includes areas that had never been under British rule before 1775. A large Japanese military presence also exists, especially in the Aztlan region around El Paso. Important technological resources, such as the Los Alamos National Laboratory, have been seized by the Japanese, with scientists being shipped to Japan in a similar manner to Operation Paperclip after World War II. Many interviewees mention the potential of a future Cold War between Britain and Japan.

Mexico, while escaping immediate destruction, without U.S. aid and trade quickly collapsed into anarchy with revolutions reported in Mexico City, mass death from famine, and outbreaks of the Cincinnati Flu. Canada, despite escaping direct hits from nuclear weapons, was affected by the electromagnetic pulse attack on the United States and its economy was destroyed as a result. The country has closed its borders to U.S. refugees, expelling many people from North Dakota who had sought shelter in the days following the war. Canadians blames the United States for having caused the war without thought of the consequences to neighboring countries. The U.S. sold Alaska to the Canadians, with the oil of Prudhoe Bay being diverted to Vancouver.

Argentina and most of Latin America, though undamaged, is alleged to have been occupied by Western nations, to stabilize food stocks allocated to Europe and to prevent a fate similar to Mexico's. The veracity of this is unknown, but one member of the British Relief refers to "the Argentine", suggesting some truth. What remains of the Soviet Union has lost control of its former satellite states in the Eastern Bloc. Elsewhere, Poland invaded Ukraine to retake territory ceded to the Soviet Union during World War II, while South Africa is at war with Zimbabwe. In the Middle East, the Israeli–Palestinian conflict continues. The developing world, particularly the Indian subcontinent, Latin America, Asia, and Africa, experienced severe population declines due to famine.

== See also ==
- Alas, Babylon
- The Day After
- List of nuclear holocaust fiction
- Nuclear holocaust
- Nuclear summer
- Nuclear weapons in popular culture
- Resurrection Day
