= An American Life =

1990 autobiography of Ronald Reagan

- Author: Robert Lindsey (with Ronald Reagan)
- Language: English
- Genre: Autobiography
- Published: November 15, 1990 Simon & Schuster
- Publication place: United States
- Media type: Print
- Pages: 748
- ISBN: 0-7434-0025-9
- OCLC: 48994916
- Dewey Decimal: 973.927092
- LC Class: E877 .R33

An American Life is the 1990 autobiography of Ronald Reagan, the 40th president of the United States. Released almost two years after Reagan left office, the book reached number eight on The New York Times Best Seller list. The book was largely ghostwritten by journalist Robert Lindsey.

== Content ==
The book is composed of 748 pages, describing Reagan's life from his birth in Tampico, Illinois, to his acting career, marriages, entrance into politics, years as Governor of California, loss in the 1976 Republican primary, and finally his years as President of the United States. Reviewer John O'Sullivan says of Reagan, "[H]e shows a tendency, where other people's feelings are concerned, to gloss over unpleasantness in a way which ... detracts ... from his value as a historian." He told his side of events that led to his 1976 presidential candidacy, as well as his relationships with members of Congress and his views on the world and the Cold War.

=== Personal life ===
Reagan was married twice: the first to actress Jane Wyman (1917–2007) from 1940 to 1948. Reagan only mentions her in one paragraph in the book, saying "it didn't work out", but that the marriage "produced two wonderful children." He married Nancy Davis in 1952, saying in the biography "Sometimes, I think my life really began when I met Nancy."

=== Presidency ===
Although covering most of the events that occurred during the Reagan presidency (1981–1989), the book's most notable omission is the rejection of Robert Bork as a Supreme Court justice, with very little mention made of Reagan's judicial appointments. One of Reagan's more controversial enactments as president were his economic policies, dubbed "Reaganomics." From the autobiography's point of view, everything about them were successful except that "the vested interests that hold sway over Congress prevented us from cutting spending nearly as much as I had hoped to, or as the country required." Also in terms of economic policy, one of Reagan's main regrets was his ultimate failure in creating a federal balanced budget.

With regard to the Iran–Contra affair, a major administration scandal that involved the diverting of funds being shipped to Iran to the contras in Nicaragua, An American Life says, "None of the arms we'd shipped to Iran had gone to the terrorists who had kidnapped our citizens." Of the scandal, Reagan writes, "[Bud] McFarlane, [John] Poindexter, [Bob] Casey, and, I presume, [Oliver] North knew how deeply I felt about the need for the contras' survival as a democratic resistance force in Nicaragua. Perhaps that knowledge... led them to support the contras secretly and saw no reason to report this to me." The autobiography goes on to claim that, "[a]s president, I was at the helm, so I am the one who is ultimately responsible." The book also discusses Reagan's political rivalry and personal friendship with former Speaker of the House Tip O'Neill.

== Reviews ==
When the book was first published, it reached number eight on The New York Times bestsellers list. Some authors, journalists, and reviewers agreed that the book presented a fair picture of Reagan's life, while others seriously questioned its historical value and purpose.
