= The Best American Mystery Stories 2009 =

First edition

The Best American Mystery Stories 2009, a volume in The Best American Mystery Stories series, was edited by Otto Penzler and by guest editor Jeffery Deaver.

== Short Stories included ==
Author	Story	Where story previously appeared
N. J. Ayres	"Rust"	At the Scene of the Crime
Tom Bissell	"My Interview with the Avenger"	The Virginia Quarterly Review
Alafair Burke	"Winning"	Blue Religion
James Lee Burke	"Big Midnight Special"	Shenandoah
Ron Carlson	"Beanball"	One Story
Michael Connelly	"Father's Day"	Blue Religion
David Corbett	"Pretty Little Paradise"	Las Vegas Noir
M. M. M. Hayes	"Meantime, Quentin Ghlee"	The Kenyon Review
Chuck Hogan	"Two Thousand Volts"	Ellery Queen's Mystery Magazine
Clark Howard	"Manila Burning"	Ellery Queen's Mystery Magazine
Rob Kantner	"Down Home Blues"	robkantner.com
Robert McClure	"My Son"	Thuglit.com
Alice Munro	"Free Radicals"	The New Yorker
Joyce Carol Oates	"Dear Husband"	Conjunctions
Nic Pizzolatto	"Wanted Men"	Oxford American
Gary Craig Powell	"Kamila and the King of Kandy"	Red Wheelbarrows
Randy Rohn	"The Man Who Fell in Love with the Stump of a Tree"	Loch Raven Review
Kristine Kathryn Rusch	"G-Men"	Sideways in Crime
Jonathan Tel	"Bola de la Fortuna"	The Yale Review
Vu Tran	"This of Any Desert"	Las Vegas Noir

== Other distinguished mystery stories of 2008 ==
Other distinguished mystery stories of 2008 honored in the volume were Jacob M. Appel's Ad Valorem (Subtropics), Ron Rash's Into the Gorge (Southern Review), Shelly Nix's Monkey (Hayden's Ferry Review), Leslie Glass's The Herald (Blue Religion) and Becky Hagenston's Midnight, Licorice, Shadow (Crazyhorse).
