= James Kunetka =

American writer (born 1944)

- Born: September 29, 1944 (age 81); New Mexico, U.S.
- Education: University of Texas at Austin
- Occupation: Author
- Notable work: Warday

James William Kunetka (born September 29, 1944) is an American writer best known for his science fiction novels Warday and Nature's End. He has also written non-fiction on the topic of the Atomic Age.

== Early life and education ==
Kunetka was born and grew up in Albuquerque, New Mexico. He received a BA in Political Science from the University of Texas at Austin.

== Career ==
Kunetka's first book, City of Fire, was published in 1978. He co-wrote two novels with his long time friend Whitley Strieber, including his best known book, Warday. A film about this book was planned, but never filmed.

In 2000, Kunetka was the director of communications and constituent relations at the University of Texas at Austin. He also served as an associate vice president of the university before retirement.

== Bibliography ==
- City of fire: Los Alamos and the birth of the Atomic Age, 1943-1945 (1978) (ISBN 978-0131346352)
- Oppenheimer: The Years of Risk (1982) (ISBN 978-0136380078)
- Warday (1984), with Whitley Strieber (ISBN 0-03-070731-5)
- Nature's End (1986), with Whitley Strieber (ISBN 0-446-51344-X)
- Shadow Man (1988) (ISBN 978-0446513586)
- Parting Shot (1991) (ISBN 978-0312052379)
- The General and the Genius: Groves and Oppenheimer (2015) (Regnery Publishing, ISBN 978-1-62157-338-8)
