= Christopher John Boyce =

American convicted of spying for the Soviet Union

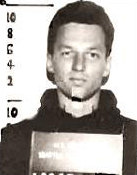
- Christopher John Boyce's U.S. Marshals Service mugshot
- Born: February 16, 1953 (age 73)
- Other name: Anthony Edward Lester
- Employer: TRW
- Known for: Espionage
- Notable work: American Sons: The Untold Story of The Falcon and The Snowman
- Criminal charges: Espionage; Escaping from prison Bank robbery
- Criminal penalty: 68 years' imprisonment
- Criminal status: Released on parole in 2002
- Spouse: Kathleen Mills (m. 2001)
- Website: thefalconandthesnowman.com

Christopher John Boyce (born February 16, 1953) is an American former defense industry employee who was convicted of spying for the Soviet Union in 1977.

Boyce was raised in Southern California and began working for aerospace firm TRW Inc. in 1974. In 1977 he and a childhood friend Andrew Daulton Lee were discovered to have been passing classified documents to Soviet officials in Mexico City in exchange for cash payments. Boyce was convicted of espionage and sentenced to 40 years in prison. During his trial he attracted attention in Australia for his disclosures about joint Australian–American activities at the Pine Gap base in Australia, as well as allegations of CIA involvement in the 1975 dismissal of the Australian prime minister Gough Whitlam.

In 1980, Boyce escaped from the Lompoc Federal Correctional Complex. He subsequently carried out a series of bank robberies in Idaho and Washington, apparently with the intent of defecting to the Soviet Union. Boyce was recaptured in 1981 and the following year was convicted of escaping from a federal penitentiary and bank robbery offenses, receiving a further 28-year prison sentence. He was eventually paroled in 2002. His espionage activities were dramatized in the 1979 Robert Lindsey book The Falcon and the Snowman and a 1985 film of the same name.

== Early life ==
Boyce is the son of Charles Eugene Boyce, former Director of Security for McDonnell Douglas Aircraft Corporation, and Noreen, née Hollenbeck. Along with his three brothers and five sisters, Boyce was reared in Southern California, in the affluent community of Rancho Palos Verdes, a suburb southwest of Los Angeles.

In 1974, Boyce was hired at TRW, an aerospace firm in Redondo Beach, California.

== Espionage ==
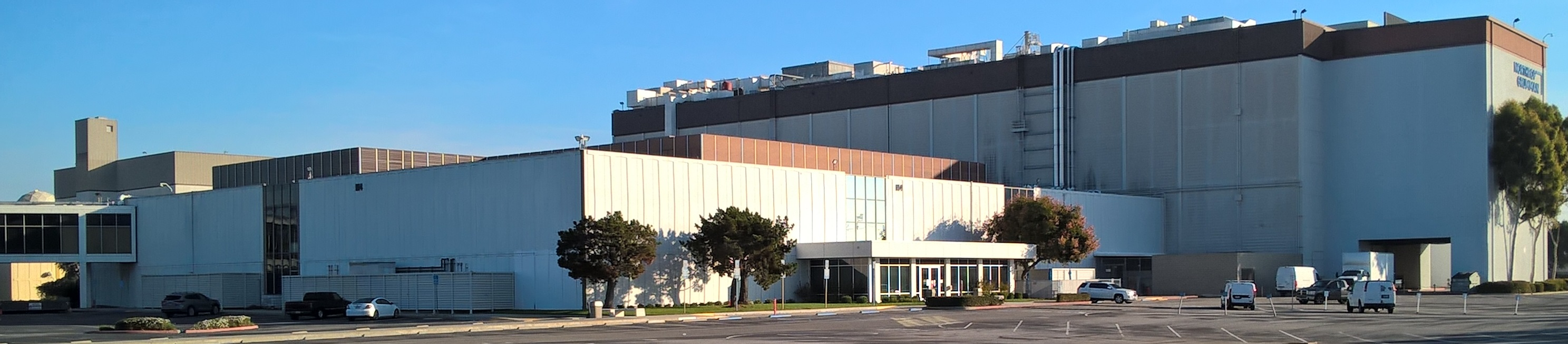
A 2023 photo of the Bldg. M4 at Space Park, where Boyce committed espionage from March 1975 through December 1976 (Note: Boyce: "Suffice it to say that from March 1975 through December 1976, I removed or photographed a sizeable number of classified documents from the highly secret "black vault" of TRW, a CIA contractor in Redondo Beach, California and sent them on with Daulton to the KGB in Mexico City. I was able to obtain those documents through my position as a specially cleared TRW employee, working in the black vault, located in building M4.")

Within months, Boyce was promoted to a highly sensitive position in TRW's "Black Vault" (classified communications center) with a top secret security clearance, where he worked with National Reconnaissance Office (NRO) transmissions.

Boyce gathered a quantity of classified documents concerning secure US communications ciphers and spy satellite development and had his friend Andrew Daulton Lee, a cocaine and heroin dealer since his high school days (hence his nickname, "The Snowman"), deliver them to Soviet embassy officials in Mexico City, returning with large sums of cash for Boyce (nicknamed "The Falcon" because of his longtime interest in falconry) and himself. In a book he co-authored with his wife, Boyce wrote that he does not believe that the information was of much value to the Soviet Union.

== Exposure and conviction ==
Boyce, then 23, was exposed after Lee was arrested by Mexican police in front of the Soviet embassy on January 6, 1977. His arrest was "almost by accident": Lee was arrested for littering. During his harsh interrogation, Lee, who had a top secret microfilm in his possession when arrested, confessed to being a Soviet spy and implicated Boyce. Boyce was arrested ten days later on January 16, when the FBI found him hiding out at the shack he was renting near Riverside, California. He was convicted on eight counts of espionage on April 28 1977, and sentenced by federal district judge Robert Kelleher on September 12 to forty years in prison, initially at Terminal Island, then the Metropolitan Correctional Center in San Diego.

=== Allegations about CIA activities in Australia ===
At his trial, Boyce said that he began getting misrouted cables from the CIA discussing the agency's desire to depose the government of Prime Minister Gough Whitlam in Australia. Boyce said the CIA wanted Whitlam removed from office because he wanted to close US military bases in Australia, including the vital Pine Gap secure communications facility, and withdraw Australian troops from Vietnam. For these reasons, John Pilger, Australian journalist and author, has written that US government pressure was a major factor in the dismissal of Whitlam as Prime Minister by the Governor General, Sir John Kerr, who, according to Boyce, was referred to as "our man Kerr" by CIA officers. Through the cable traffic, Boyce saw that the CIA was involving itself in such a manner not just with Australia but with other democratic, industrialized allies as well. Boyce considered going to the press, but believed the media's earlier disclosure of CIA involvement in the 1973 Chilean coup d'état had not changed anything for the better.

Boyce testified at his trial that the CIA had "practiced deception against Australia during 1975" by covering up activities at Pine Gap, a notionally jointly administered defense facility in central Australia. He stated that his duties at TRW had included sending "misleading communications to Australia" and that he had been told by TRW that the CIA was "manipulating Australian union leaders to try to suppress rail and airline strikes", and that his outrage at these operations was what had motivated his decision to leak information.

== Imprisonment and escape ==
On July 10, 1979, Boyce was transferred to the federal penitentiary in Lompoc, California. He escaped from Lompoc on January 21, 1980. Boyce managed to evade the authorities and ended up in northern Idaho, where he found refuge in a cabin outside Bonners Ferry. While a fugitive, Boyce carried out 17 bank robberies in Idaho and Washington, hoping to pay for passage to the Soviet Union, and adopted the alias of "Anthony Edward Lester". Boyce reportedly told several associates the tactics and routes for escaping to the Soviet Union (through Alaska to Siberia), where he planned on presenting himself to a senior Soviet military representative. It was his expectation that he would be flown to Moscow, honored as an agent who had performed valuable services for the Soviet Union and given his Soviet citizenship and a commission, and then, after his features were changed by plastic surgery, he might return to the United States as a Soviet agent. Boyce's flight instructor corroborated some of Boyce's alleged destination objectives, noting the unusual frequency Boyce arbitrarily inquired into "polar aviation," like flying through "polar regions." When asked why he was so interested in glacial territories, Boyce dismissively acknowledged, "making a trip into Alaska" someday. On August 21, 1981, after befriending two indigent drifter brothers, Brian and Thomas Hill, who eventually turned Boyce in hoping to collect a reward (even after Brian had participated in multiple bank robberies, acting as Boyce's getaway driver), Christopher Boyce was arrested by U.S. Marshals while eating in his car outside "The Pit Stop", a drive-in restaurant in Port Angeles, Washington.

== Return to prison ==
On January 26, 1982, in Los Angeles, Boyce was convicted of escape from federal prison in a nonjury trial before U.S. District Court Judge Lawrence Lydick, a proceeding which lasted three minutes. The following week he was flown to Idaho and was arraigned in Boise, where he pleaded not guilty to charges related to multiple bank robberies.

That spring, Boyce appeared before Judge Harold L. Ryan in U.S. District Court in Boise and was sentenced to three years for his escape and 25 years for bank robbery, conspiracy, and breaking federal gun laws. Given an aggregate total sentence of 68 years, he was transferred to United States Penitentiary, Leavenworth in northeastern Kansas.

Later that year, Boyce gave a television interview to Ray Martin for Australia's 60 Minutes about the dismissal of Whitlam. After this, he was assaulted by fellow inmates, an attack he believed was orchestrated by prison guards. After the attack, he was transferred to USP Marion in southern Illinois, where he was held in isolation.

In April 1985, Boyce gave testimony on how to prevent insider spy threats to the Senate Permanent Subcommittee on Investigations as part of its Government Personnel Security Program.

With support from senators, he was transferred out of solitary confinement in 1988 to the Minnesota Correctional Facility – Oak Park Heights near the Twin Cities. At this prison in January 1993, Boyce was almost killed by Earl Steven Karr, a mentally ill fellow inmate and convicted pipe bomber. Karr had planned to blind Boyce with a mace-like concoction after luring him into his cell, then electrocute him using a homemade electric shock prod fashioned out of a rod and newspaper. The plot failed when Karr slipped on a puddle of mace, allowing Boyce time to escape.

Boyce was transferred in 1998 to ADX Florence, the supermax facility in Colorado west of Pueblo; he believed this was punishment for authoring multiple newspaper editorials critical of the Federal Bureau of Prisons' administration. In 2000, he was transferred to FCI Sheridan in Oregon, northwest of Salem.

== Release and subsequent life ==
Boyce was released from prison on parole on September 16, 2002, after serving a little more than 25 years, accounting for his time spent outside from the escape. Shortly thereafter he married Kathleen Mills, whom he had met when she was working as a paralegal spearheading efforts to obtain parole for Lee. After her success with Lee, she turned her attention to securing parole for Boyce as well, and the two developed a personal relationship. Boyce is on good terms with his father and eight siblings, and was with his mother as well until her death in 2017.

In 2013, Boyce published a book titled American Sons: The Untold Story of the Falcon and the Snowman, which mainly discusses his time in prison and relationship with his wife, Kathleen, and writer Vince Font. At that time, he was living a relatively quiet life where he has resumed his participation in falconry as a frequent pastime. When interviewed at the time his book was released, Boyce expressed support for the actions of Edward Snowden in exposing information about the United States government's surveillance programs.

== In popular culture ==
The story of their case was told in Robert Lindsey's best-selling 1979 book The Falcon and the Snowman. This book was turned into a film of the same title in 1985 by director John Schlesinger starring Timothy Hutton as Boyce and Sean Penn as Lee.

Lindsey's initial book was followed by The Flight of the Falcon: The True Story of the Escape and Manhunt for America's Most Wanted Spy (1983), an account of Boyce's escape from prison and subsequent bank robbing spree, and the U.S. Marshals Service cross-continental manhunt for Boyce.

Boyce is name-checked in the lyrics of Luna's song, "Moon Palace", on their 1995 album, Penthouse.

== See also ==
- Alleged CIA involvement in the Whitlam Dismissal
- United States espionage in Australia
