= Andrew Daulton Lee =

American spy and former drug dealer

- Born: January 3, 1952 (age 74)
- Known for: Espionage

Andrew Daulton Lee (January 3, 1952) is a former drug dealer who was convicted of espionage for his involvement in the Cold War spying activities of his childhood friend, Christopher Boyce.

Lee was the adopted eldest son of Dr. Daulton Lee, a wealthy California physician, and graduated from Palos Verdes High School in 1970. His lifelong friendship with Boyce led him into espionage activities after Boyce, an employee of US defense contractor TRW (headquartered in the Los Angeles suburb of Redondo Beach), began stealing classified documents detailing how to decrypt secure US government message traffic and detailed specifications of the latest US spy satellites with the intention of delivering them to agents of the Soviet Union. Boyce lured Lee into the espionage by telling him the CIA was spying on Australia. With Boyce's stolen documents, Lee traveled to Mexico City, where he delivered them to Soviet embassy officials at Boyce's direction. Lee often used these trips as an opportunity to engage in drug deals.

Lee and Boyce made an agreement to evenly split the profits from the espionage ring, and Boyce had used his share mainly for his personal use. Lee used his split of the profits to further his drug business, purchasing more expensive drugs, such as heroin, and being able to gain tremendous profits by selling the expensive and rare drugs in the United States. Boyce maintained that he continued with the espionage activity because Lee threatened and blackmailed him. He alleged that Lee made copies of the stolen documents with the intention of selling them to the Chinese, but this was false testimony by Boyce to exculpate himself to get a lighter sentence.

In January 1977, Lee (with top secret microfilm in his possession) was arrested by Mexican police in front of the Soviet embassy in Mexico City for littering. Under interrogation and torture, he confessed to espionage. Contrary to Boyce's story, Lee never blackmailed Boyce nor did he implicate Boyce in the espionage and did not testify against Boyce. Lee was returned to the United States, where he was convicted of espionage on May 14. He was sentenced by federal district judge Robert Kelleher to life in prison and moved to the federal penitentiary in Lompoc, California, while Boyce received a sentence of forty years.

When Boyce escaped from prison in early 1980, Lee was immediately remanded to another facility in Terre Haute, Indiana. Boyce approached Lee 24 hours before the escape and asked Lee to participate. Lee responded "I came in the front door, I'm going out the same way".

Lee was portrayed by actor Sean Penn in director John Schlesinger's 1985 movie The Falcon and the Snowman, based on the book of the same name by Robert Lindsey. Lee's drug-dealing earned him the nickname "The Snowman", while Boyce's interest in falconry won him his own sobriquet. Boyce was played in the film by actor Timothy Hutton.

After 21 years of incarceration, Lee was released on parole in 1998. Kathleen Mills, an activist who had worked towards earning Lee's parole, turned her attention towards the release of Boyce following Lee's freedom and eventually married Boyce. After his release, Lee briefly worked for Sean Penn as his personal assistant.
