= Robert Lindsey (journalist) =

American journalist (1935–2025)

- Born: Robert Hughes Lindsey Jr. January 4, 1935; Glendale, California, U.S.
- Died: December 19, 2025 (aged 90); Carmel-by-the-Sea, California, U.S.
- Education: San Jose State College
- Spouse: Sandra Wurts (m. 1956–2025)
- Children: 2
- Awards: Edgar Allan Poe Award; CWA Gold Dagger for Non-Fiction

Robert Hughes Lindsey Jr. (January 4, 1935 – December 19, 2025) was an American journalist and author of several true crime books, including The Falcon and the Snowman: A True Story of Friendship and Espionage (1979) and A Gathering of Saints: A True Story of Money, Murder and Deceit (1988).

== Early life and education ==
Lindsey was born in Glendale, California, on December 19, 1935, and raised in Inglewood. In the 1950s, Lindsey attended San Jose State College with the dream of majoring in Journalism. He received a Bachelor's Degree in History from San Jose State College in 1956.

== Career ==
Upon graduation from college, Lindsey began working at the San Jose Mercury-News as a reporter. In the 1970s, he relocated to Los Angeles and became the Los Angeles bureau chief for The New York Times. He retired in 1988 as The Times' chief West Coast correspondent, based in San Francisco. A former executive editor of the Times, A.M. Rosenthal, said Lindsey was “one of the best reporters the Times has had in years and years.”

In the late 1980s, Lindsey began working with Marlon Brando, who had hired him to help with Brando's autobiography, and with Ronald Reagan, at the request of an editor at Simon & Schuster, which published Reagan's autobiography in 1990.

Lindsey's papers from 1950 through 1999 are stored in the Archives and Special Collections of the California State University, Monterey Bay.

== Notable works ==
=== The Falcon and the Snowman ===
In 1977, Lindsey began chronicling the story of Christopher John Boyce and Andrew Daulton Lee, who were both convicted of selling information to the Soviets. The Falcon and the Snowman was eventually published in 1979 and in 1980 he received the Edgar Allan Poe Award for best non-fiction crime book. In 1983, the sequel, The Flight of the Falcon: The True Story of the Escape and Manhunt for America's Most Wanted Spy, was released; it chronicled Boyce's escape from federal prison and subsequent bank robbing spree. The Falcon and the Snowman was optioned for a film and was subsequently made into a film of the same name, released in January 1985.

The Falcon and the Snowman won the Edgar Allan Poe Award for Best Fact Crime in 1980.

=== A Gathering of Saints ===
Lindsey's third non-fiction book was A Gathering of Saints: A True Story of Money, Murder and Deceit released in 1988. The book tells the story of a series of incidents involving document forger Mark Hofmann and the Church of Jesus Christ of Latter-day Saints (LDS Church). During the early 1980s, Hofmann, an LDS document dealer, began to uncover a series of potentially damaging documents implying that Joseph Smith, far from being the angelically inspired founder of a church, was in fact a diviner led to a cache of gold by a spirit that took the form of a white salamander. These documents were in actuality forgeries made by Hofmann, but the quality was such that it took some intensive detective work to uncover this, even after a number of document experts had found them to be "genuine". Lindsey won the 1989 CWA Gold Dagger for Non-Fiction for this book.

=== Other works ===
Marlon Brando and Ronald Reagan utilized Lindsey as a ghostwriter in writing their memoirs; respectively, Brando: Songs My Mother Taught Me, and Ronald Reagan: An American Life. Lindsey's own memoir, Ghost Scribbler, was published in 2012.

== Personal ==
In 1956, Lindsey married Sandra Wurts; she died in August 2025. Lindsey died in Carmel, California on December 19, 2025, at the age of 90. He was survived by a daughter and son, and by four grandchildren.

== Books ==
- The Falcon and the Snowman: A True Story of Friendship and Espionage, Robert Lindsey (Simon & Schuster; 1979) ISBN 0-671-24560-0
- The Flight of the Falcon, Robert Lindsey (Simon & Schuster; 1983) ISBN 0-671-45159-6
- A Gathering of Saints: A True Story of Money, Murder and Deceit, Robert Lindsey (Simon & Schuster; 1988) ISBN 0-671-65112-9
- Ronald Reagan: An American Life, Ronald Reagan (with Robert Lindsey) (Simon & Schuster; 1990) ISBN 1-451-62073-X
- Irresistible Impulse: A True Story of Blood and Money, Robert Lindsey (Simon & Schuster; 1992) ISBN 0-671-68069-2
- Songs My Mother Taught Me, Marlon Brando (with Robert Lindsey) (Random House; 1994) ISBN 0-679-41013-9
- Ghost Scribbler: Searching for Reagan, Brando and the King of Pop, Robert Lindsey (CreateSpace; 2012) ISBN 1-481-20119-0
