= Resurrection Day (novel) =

1999 alternate history novel by Brendan DuBois

- Author: Brendan DuBois
- Language: English
- Genre: Alternate history
- Publisher: Jove
- Publication date: 1999
- Publication place: United States
- Media type: Print
- Pages: 387 (hardcover)
- ISBN: 0-399-14498-6
- OCLC: 40510549
- Dewey Decimal: 813/.54 21
- LC Class: PS3554.U2564 R47 1999

Resurrection Day is a 1999 novel written by Brendan DuBois. In its alternate history, the Cuban Missile Crisis escalated into a full-scale war, the Soviet Union is devastated, and the United States has been reduced to a third-rate power that relies on the United Kingdom for aid. The novel won the Sidewise Award for Alternate History that year.

== Plot ==
Set in the aftermath of a nuclear war between the Soviet Union and the United States, the book chronicles the investigations of Carl Landry, a reporter for The Boston Globe. As the story unfolds, Carl attempts to uncover the events leading up to the war and to run from those who would have the truth buried.

The story begins in 1972, ten years after a nuclear war between the Americans and the Soviets, which was precipitated by the Cuban Missile Crisis.

Washington, D.C.; New York City; Omaha; San Diego; Miami; and other US cities, principally those surrounding military bases, have been destroyed, damaged, or rendered uninhabitable by Soviet nuclear attacks. Philadelphia is now the capital of the United States. Although the Mexican-born President George W. Romney is nominally in office, the country is effectively under martial law. The Soviets have been utterly devastated by American nuclear strikes. Cuba is an atomic ruin, with Spain responsible for relief efforts to aid what is left of the island's population.

One consequence of the war is that the US embroilment in Vietnam is abruptly curtailed. US military personnel in South Vietnam and the rest of the world are withdrawn to stabilize the US in the aftermath of the Soviet missile and air strikes. The People's Republic of China has also collapsed, with numerous regional warlords waging a civil war against one another.

US nuclear strikes on the Soviets led to the collapse of the Warsaw Pact and to the release of a massive fallout cloud over much of Asia that kills millions of those who survived the destruction of the Soviets. As a consequence, the US has become a pariah in the eyes of much of the world. Many governments regard members of the US Air Force as war criminals, and its servicemen are advised not to travel abroad. After the 1962 war, nearly all the remaining countries of the globe have renounced possession of nuclear weapons. The US alone retained an atomic arsenal.

Western Europe survived the war largely unscathed. NATO collapsed almost as soon as hostilities had commenced, with France and a reunited Germany now presiding over the continent. The United Kingdom and Canada remain American allies and actively assist in post-war reconstruction efforts in US states that were hit the hardest by the war. The British, since 1962, have managed to regain much of their pre-1939 colonial confidence in the vacuum that is left by the destruction of the Soviet Union and the emasculation of the US in world affairs. The policy of decolonization has been halted and even reversed. Some newly independent nations even return to the remaining British "Empire" in the new uncertain world that was created after the "Cuban War." British aid is welcome, but there is also a sense of resentment among the American population over its excessive dependence on the British. The large presence of British and Canadian military personnel in the United States is also a source of contention, and some Americans wonder whether their allies possess ulterior motives.

The story covers two parallel plotlines. One involves Landry's attempts to discover what happened in Washington, DC, in October 1962. US military propaganda accounts maintain that the Cuban War broke out because of John F. Kennedy's recklessness and incompetence; those claims are generally believed. Kennedy and his officials are regarded as butchers and war criminals and the only senior surviving member of his inner circle, McGeorge Bundy, is imprisoned in Fort Leavenworth. In contrast, US military commanders (notably the Chief Staff of the Air Force, General "Rammer" Curtis, based on the real-life General Curtis LeMay) are portrayed as the saviors of the nation. During the course of the novel, Landry gradually discovers that it was Kennedy who sought to prevent the crisis over Cuba from escalating into war and that last-minute attempts to achieve a deal with Nikita Khrushchev to end the crisis were deliberately sabotaged by Curtis and other generals.

The other plotline concerns British-American relations. Landry and a British journalist, Sandy Price, discover that elements within the British government and security services are plotting a military takeover (or anschluss) of the US. The plan is underway near the end of the novel until it is called off at the last minute.

== Major characters ==
- Carl Landry – protagonist; a young reporter for The Boston Globe
- Sandra "Sandy" Price – British newspaper reporter and undercover operative for MI6
- General Ramsey "Rammer" Curtis – fictional United States Air Force general responsible for the Cuban Missile Crisis escalating into worldwide nuclear war; based on General Curtis LeMay
- "Two-Tone" – homeless man in Carl's neighborhood; ex-major of the 82nd Airborne Division and a veteran of the U.S. Army airborne invasion of Cuba and victim of Soviet tactical nuclear strike on the invading U.S. forces

== Locations ==
- Tyler Air Force Station, New York – fictional United States Air Force base located on the outskirts of New York City
- Boston, Massachusetts
- New York City, New York

== See also ==
- Alas, Babylon, a 1959 novel dealing with the effects of a nuclear war on the fictional small town of Fort Repose, Florida
- Warday, a 1984 novel about a limited nuclear exchange between the U.S. and the Soviets and its subsequent aftermath, which also includes a resurgence of British Imperial power
- The World Next Door, a 1990 novel about the Cuban Missile Crisis escalating to a nuclear exchange, and the devastated U.S. blames Kennedy
