= Brendan DuBois =

American novelist

- Born: 1959 or 1960 (age 66–67); Dover, New Hampshire, U.S.
- Education: University of New Hampshire
- Occupation: Writer
- Writing career
- Years active: 1986–2024
- Genres: Mystery fiction, alternate history
- Notable work: Resurrection Day
- Notable awards: Sidewise Award for Alternate History; Shamus Award (2)

Brendan Arthur DuBois (born 1959 or 1960) is an American writer in the genres of mystery fiction and alternate history. He is best known for his 1999 novel Resurrection Day. He was charged for possessing child pornography in July 2024 and sentenced to 3 1/2 to seven years in prison after he pleaded guilty in March 2025.

== Biography ==
DuBois was born and raised in Dover, New Hampshire, graduated from St. Thomas Aquinas High School located there, and then graduated from the University of New Hampshire (UNH) in 1982. He served as editor-in-chief of the UNH student newspaper, The New Hampshire. In the 1982 edition of the UNH yearbook, The Granite, he wrote that he had been afflicted with a rare form of cancer, ependymoma of the filum terminale. After graduating from college, DuBois spent a year as a newspaper reporter. He has been married at least twice; in 1985 and in 1995. As of 2015, he was married and living in Exeter, New Hampshire.

His first short story to be published was "Dark Corridor", which appeared in Ellery Queen's Mystery Magazine in February 1986. His first novel, Dead Sand, was published in 1994. DuBois has twice won a Shamus Award for Best Short Story, in 1995 and 2001. His short story "The Dark Snow", first published in Playboy in 1997, was included in several anthologies including The Best American Mystery Stories 1997 and The Best American Mystery Stories of the Century. DuBois is best known for his alternate history novel Resurrection Day (1999), which won the Sidewise Award for Alternate History. The 12th book in his novel series featuring protagonist Lewis Cole, Terminal Surf, was published in June 2024.

DuBois was the champion on the September 28, 2012, episode of Jeopardy! and defeated "The Beast" on the February 24, 2015, episode of The Chase.

== Child pornography possession conviction ==
On July 10, 2024, DuBois was arrested in Exeter, New Hampshire, and charged with six felony counts of possession of child pornography. He was arraigned the next day and held at the Rockingham County Jail. Severn River Publishing, which published or republished 12 of his novels, subsequently removed all of his books from its online catalog. On March 13, 2025, DuBois pleaded guilty to four counts of possession of child sex abuse images; he was sentenced to 3.5 to 7 years in prison.

== Bibliography ==
=== Novels ===
- Resurrection Day (1999)
- Six Days (2001)
- Betrayed (2003)
- Final Winter (2006)
- Twilight (aka Dead of Night) (2007)
- Amerikan Eagle (written as Alan Glenn) (2011)
- Night Road (2016)
- The Negotiator (2018)
- The First Lady (2018)
- The Cornwalls Are Gone (2019) written with James Patterson
- Blow Back (2022) written with James Patterson

==== Lewis Cole series ====
1. Dead Sand (1994)
2. Black Tide (1995)
3. Shattered Shell (1999)
4. Killer Waves (2001)
5. Buried Dreams (2004)
6. Primary Storm (2006)
7. Deadly Cove (2011)
8. Fatal Harbor (2014)
9. Blood Foam (2015)
10. Storm Cell (2016)
11. Hard Aground (2018)
12. Terminal Surf (2024)

==== Empire of the North series (ebooks) ====
1. The Noble Warrior (2012)
2. The Noble Prisoner (2012)
3. The Noble Prince (2012)

==== Dark Victory series ====
1. Dark Victory (2015)
2. Red Vengeance (2017)
3. Black Triumph (2018)
