= The Falcon and the Snowman =

1985 film by John Schlesinger

- Theatrical release poster
- Directed by: John Schlesinger
- Screenplay by: Steven Zaillian
- Based on: The Falcon and the Snowman: A True Story of Friendship and Espionage by Robert Lindsey
- Produced by: Gabriel Katzka; John Schlesinger
- Starring: Timothy Hutton; Sean Penn
- Cinematography: Allen Daviau
- Edited by: Richard Marden
- Music by: Lyle Mays; Pat Metheny
- Production company: Hemdale Film Corporation
- Distributed by: Orion Pictures
- Release date: January 25, 1985 (United States)
- Running time: 131 minutes
- Country: United States
- Language: English
- Budget: $12 million
- Box office: $17 million

The Falcon and the Snowman is a 1985 American spy drama film directed by John Schlesinger. The screenplay by Steven Zaillian is based on the 1979 book The Falcon and the Snowman: A True Story of Friendship and Espionage by Robert Lindsey, and tells the true story of two young American men, Christopher Boyce (Timothy Hutton) and Andrew Daulton Lee (Sean Penn), who sold security secrets to the Soviet Union.

The film's original music was performed by the Pat Metheny Group, and featured singer David Bowie on "This Is Not America".

The film received positive reviews from critics, particularly for the performances of Penn and Hutton.

== Plot ==
Christopher Boyce, an expert in the sport of falconry and the son of a former FBI special agent, gets a job as a civilian defense contractor working in the so-called "Black Vault," a secure communication facility through which flows information on some of the most classified US operations in the world. Boyce becomes disillusioned with the US government through his new position, especially after reading a misrouted communiqué dealing with the CIA's plan to depose the Prime Minister of Australia. Frustrated by this duplicity, Boyce decides to repay his government by passing classified secrets to the Soviets.

Daulton Lee is Boyce's childhood friend, a drug addict and minor cocaine smuggler nicknamed "The Snowman", who has frustrated and alienated his family. Lee agrees to contact and deal with the KGB's agents in Mexico on Boyce's behalf, motivated not by idealism but by what he perceives as an opportunity to make money with plans to settle in Costa Rica, a nation that at that time had no extradition treaty with the United States.

As the pair become increasingly involved with espionage, Lee's ambition to create a major espionage business coupled with his excessive drug use begins to strain the two from each other. Alex, their Soviet handler, becomes increasingly reluctant to deal with Lee as the middleman because of Lee's periods of irrationality. Above all, Boyce wants to end the espionage so that he can resume a normal life with his girlfriend Lana and attend college. Boyce meets with Lee's KGB handler to explain the situation. Meanwhile, Lee is desperate to regain the Soviets' regard after realizing that the KGB no longer needs him as a courier. Lee is observed tossing a note over the fence at the Soviet embassy in Mexico City and is arrested by Mexican police and a US Foreign Service officer accompanies him to the police station.

When the police search his pockets and find film from a Minox camera Boyce used to photograph documents along with a postcard used by the Soviets to show Lee the location of a drop zone, they produce pictures of the same location that was on the postcard, showing officers surrounding a dead policeman on the street. The Foreign Service officer explains that the Mexican police are trying to implicate him with the murder of the policeman. The police then take Lee away and interrogate him violently.

Hours later, Lee reveals that he is a Soviet spy. Told by the Mexican police that he will be deported, Lee is offered a choice of where to be sent. Lee suggests Costa Rica, where he owns a house paid for with drug money, but the choice is merely between the Soviet Union and the United States. Lee reluctantly agrees to go back to America and is arrested as he walks across the border.

Realizing that he too will soon be captured, Boyce releases his pet falcon, Fawkes, and then sits down to wait. Moments later, US Marshals and FBI agents surround him. In the closing scene, Lee and Boyce are seen being escorted to prison.

== Cast ==
- Timothy Hutton as Christopher Boyce
- Sean Penn as Daulton Lee
- Richard Dysart as Dr. Lee
- Pat Hingle as Mr. Boyce
- Lori Singer as Lana
- Dorian Harewood as Gene
- Chris Makepeace as David Lee
- Macon McCalman as Larry Rogers
- Joyce Van Patten as Mrs. Boyce
- Priscilla Pointer as Mrs. Lee
- Nicholas Pryor as Eddie
- David Suchet as Alex
- Sam Ingraffia as Kenny Kahn
- Mady Kaplan as Laurie
- Boris Leskin as Mikhael
- Daniel McDonald as Clay
- Marvin McIntyre as Ike
- Jennifer Runyon as Carole

== Reception ==
=== Critical reception ===
On the review aggregator website Rotten Tomatoes, 83% of 24 critics' reviews are positive, with an average rating of 7.3/10. The website's consensus reads: "Stranger than fiction and improbably entertaining, The Falcon and the Snowman shows how easily idealism can be twisted into treason." Metacritic, which uses a weighted average, assigned the film a score of 68 out of 100, based on 15 critics, indicating "generally favorable" reviews. Film critic Roger Ebert gave it a perfect four-star rating, citing one of the many strengths as that "it succeeds, in an admirably matter-of-fact way, in showing us exactly how these two young men got in way over their heads. This is a movie about spies, but it is not a thriller in any routine sense of the word. It's just the meticulously observant record of how naiveté, inexperience, misplaced idealism and greed led to one of the most peculiar cases of treason in American history."

Film critic Gene Siskel of the Chicago Tribune also gave the film four stars and hailed Hutton and Penn's work in the film, writing that "it's tough to spot Penn in this new role" and calling Penn's performance rare because it "neither patronizes nor celebrates drug use; instead, it's absolutely lifelike, and for a film based on a true story, there is no greater compliment." Siskel also noted that the two lead characters formed an odd couple that made "a terrific formula for a movie, creating at least three stories: The plight of each man, their joint effort to accomplish their goal and the changing dynamic of their relationship as the story progresses. As if that weren't enough, 'The Falcon and the Snowman' also turns into a 'how-to' movie with a fine sense of detail for the worlds of espionage and drugs." Siskel would go on to include the film in his ranked list of top ten films of 1985 on At The Movies.

=== Box office ===
In the United States and Canada, The Falcon and The Snowman grossed $17.1 million at the box office, against a budget of $12 million.

== Captain Midnight intrusion ==
On April 27, 1986, a broadcast of the film by HBO was interrupted for 4.5 minutes by a pirate broadcast featuring a message protesting the network's introduction of signal scrambling and higher charges for satellite dish owners. The incident made national headlines; the hacker, electrical engineer John MacDougall, was eventually arrested and fined $5,000.
