= New South Wales Police Force =

Law enforcement agency of New South Wales, Australia

NSW Police Force
- Badge

- Flag
- Motto: Culpam Poena Premit Comes; Punishment swiftly follows crime

Agency overview
- Formed: 1862
- Employees: 20,395
- Annual budget: A$5.51 billion (2024–25)

Jurisdictional structure
- Operations jurisdiction: New South Wales, Australia
- Location of New South Wales
- Area: 809,444 square kilometres (312,528 sq mi)
- Population: 8,072,163
- Legal jurisdiction: As per operations jurisdiction
- Governing body: Government of New South Wales
- Constituting instrument: Police Act 1990 (NSW)
- General nature: Local civilian police

Operational structure
- Headquarters: Parramatta, New South Wales
- Minister responsible: Yasmin Catley, Minister for Police
- Agency executive: Mal Lanyon, Commissioner

Facilities
- Stations: 432
- Airbases: 1
- Drones: 1
- Police Boats: 52
- Helicopters: 6
- Aeroplanes: 3
- Horses: 38

Website
- police.nsw.gov.au

The NSW Police Force is the principal law enforcement agency in the Australian state of New South Wales. Established in 1862, the organisation has more than 15,000 police officers and is the largest police force in Australia. The force has a jurisdiction covering 801,600 square kilometres and more than 8.2 million people.

In 2025, the police force had 20,395 employees – 15,887 police officers and 4,508 administrative staff – with a budget of AUD $5.51 billion. It operates 432 police stations, 3,300 vehicles, 52 boats and 9 aircraft. It is organised into police area commands (PACs) in metropolitan areas, police districts (PDs) in rural areas and specialist commands.

The police force performs law enforcement in all areas of the state. Local government authorities and other agencies have very limited law enforcement responsibilities. The capacity of magistrates and justices to appoint constables was removed and the commissioner of NSW Police now has sole control of the appointment of constables in the state.

== Mission statement and aims ==
The Police Act 1990 states the mission of the NSW Police is "to work with the community to reduce violence, crime and fear".

NSW Police aim to protect the community by

- Preventing, detecting and investigating crime
- Monitoring and promoting road safety
- Maintaining social order
- Performing and coordinating search and rescue operations

== Insignia, motto and symbols ==
Until 1972, NSW Police wore very plain insignia containing just the words "Police" and "New South Wales" or "N.S.W.", a crown and sometimes a state badge. After 1972, NSW Police wore hexagonal shoulder patches with the text "N.S.W. Police." After 1972, NSW Police adopted a far more elaborate and colourful insignia featuring a diminutive state badge above a soaring wedge-tailed eagle carrying a scroll with the word Nemesis, the Greek goddess of chastisement and vengeance, which is meant to signify retribution and justice, within a ring containing the name at the time – initially "New South Wales Police Department" and currently "New South Wales Police Force", surrounded by a wreath. All above a ribbon containing the motto Culpram Poena Premit Comes, and all surmounted by the crown of the NSW head of state. This police insignia was first used, informally, in 1959 at a South Pacific Police Commissioners' Conference in the table place names of each of the attending commissioners and was designed for this purpose by then Detective Sergeant Norm Merchant but was not adopted for use on uniforms or widely until 1972. Its current badges, including those worn on uniform shoulders, contain the insignia elaborated even further in a shield shape edged in yellow with "N.S.W. Police" repeated in yellow, at the top.

Its current motto is in Latin, Culpam Poena Premit Comes ("Punishment follows closely upon the heels of crime").

In August 2024, the NSW Police changed their digital badge from St Edward's Crown to the Tudor Crown following the accession of King Charles III, who had succeeded Queen Elizabeth II in September 2022.

=== Banner, flag and pennants ===
On 29 September 2006, the Governor of New South Wales, Marie Bashir, presented a banner to NSW Police at a ceremony held adjacent to the NSW Police roll of honour at The Domain.

NSW Police sometimes use a flag, with the Nemesis emblem on a bicolour of light blue over white. In ceremonies, Mounted Police occasionally carry swallow-tailed blue and white pennants on lances. The Commissioner and VIP cyclists sometimes use swallow-tailed blue and white pennants with a Nemesis logo on their transportation.

== History ==
The NSW Police were established in 1862 under the Police Regulation Act 1862 which unified all existing police units in the colony under an Inspector General of Police.

=== 1788 – Early forms of law enforcement ===
Law enforcement has existed in various forms since the foundation of the colony of New South Wales at Sydney in 1788. In order to protect the infant town against thieves and petty criminals after dark, Governor Arthur Phillip authorised the formation of a nightwatch in August 1789, consisting of eight of the best-behaved convicts. After his appointment as the new governor of New South Wales, Governor Lachlan Macquarie restructured the various police in January 1811, setting up a basic system of ranks and control and recruiting free men instead of convicts. Police units were under the rule of the District Magistrates.

=== 1825 – NSW Mounted Police ===
After conflict in 1824 with the Wiradjuri people around Bathurst and Mudgee, the colonial authorities in New South Wales recognised the need for a mounted force to maintain control on the frontier. As a result, the NSW Mounted Police was formed in the following year. Up until 1850, this force operated as de facto cavalry unit as the troopers were soldiers requisitioned from the colonial forces of Australia. Their main tasks in this period were to subdue groups of Aboriginals resisting European colonisation and to capture bushrangers. From 1850 the Mounted Police took on a more civilian role. In 2009, it had 34 horses and was claimed to be the oldest mounted police unit in the world. Another specialist group formed commenced operation during this time. The Water Police were formed in 1832.

=== 1839 – Border Police ===
By this stage, the NSW government could not afford the cost of maintaining the Mounted Police along the expanding frontiers of the colony. A new frontier police consisting of mounted convict troopers, called the Border Police, was therefore established. The convicts assigned were mostly soldiers who had run afoul of the law. The Border Police was funded by a levy placed on the squatters who had brought livestock into the areas beyond the borders of settlement. In addition to controlling the Aboriginal and bushranger threats, the Border Police were also tasked with resolving land disputes with the squatters.

=== 1848 – Native Police ===
With the end of convict transportation approaching, the Border Police was dissolved and replaced with another low-cost frontier force called the Native Police. This force consisted of Aboriginal troopers under the command of European officers. The role of this force was mostly to maintain peace between Aboriginals and settlers. Some writers suggest it suppressed Aboriginal resistance and exploited intertribal hostility. From 1859, the responsibility of the Native Police passed from the NSW government to the newly formed Queensland government.

In the early 1850s, Victoria was separated from New South Wales and created its own force.

=== 1862 – Establishment of the Police Force ===
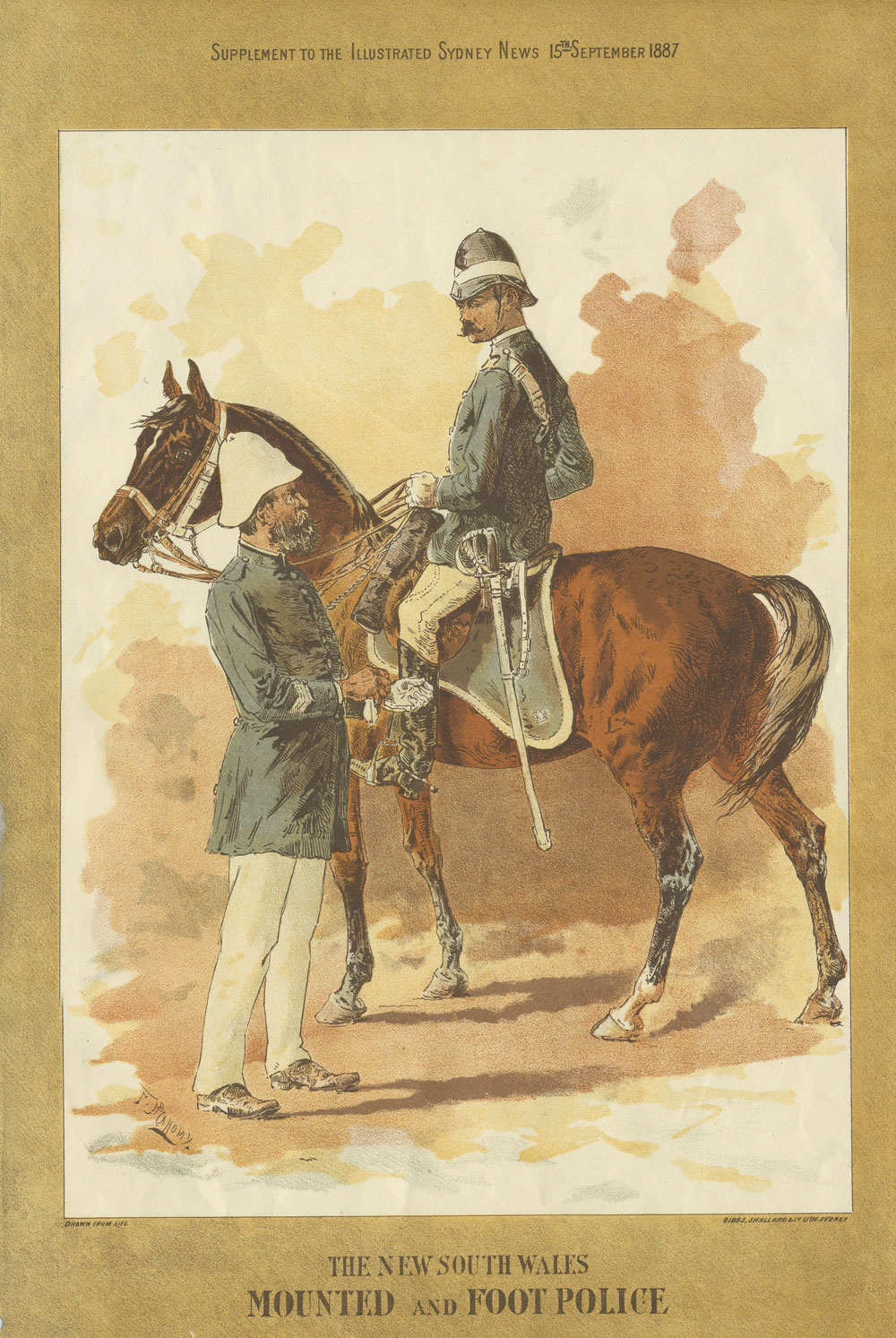
"The New South Wales Mounted and Foot Police" - circa 1887

As the colony expanded, a more sophisticated form of crime management was called for. This involved unifying all the police units into a single cohesive police organisation with the centralisation of authority. After a failed attempt made by Act No. 38 of 1850, unified control of the police eventuated in 1862 when the Police Regulation Act (1862) was passed, establishing the NSW Police. The first Inspector General of Police, John McLerie, was appointed to assume overall authority and responsibility. The Police Regulation (Amendment) Act, passed in 1935, changed the title to Commissioner of Police, with its role clearly defined. The position of Deputy Commissioner was also created.

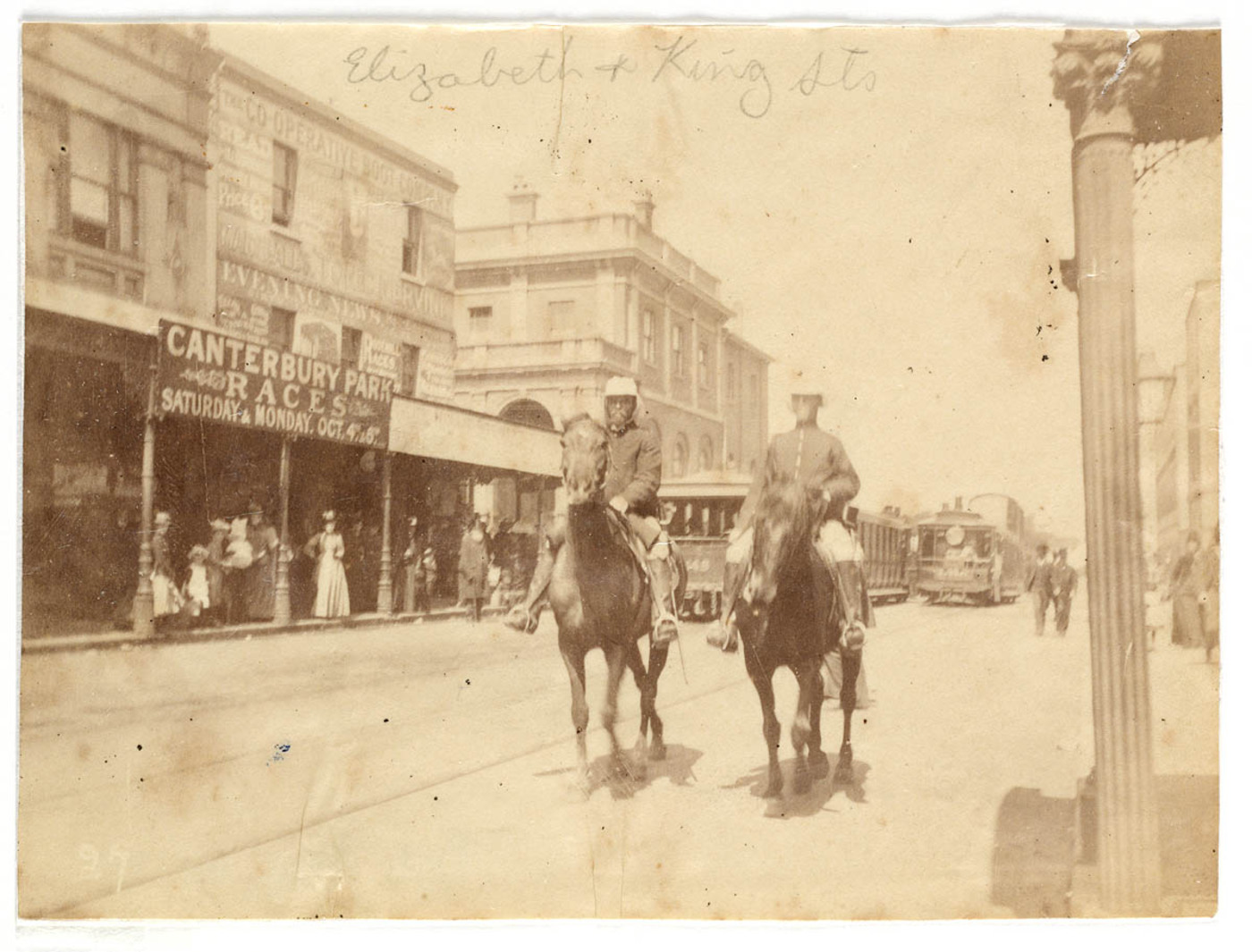
Mounted police officers in 1890

By 1872, there were 70 police stations throughout the colony in sub-districts, with a total of 803 police officers.

In July 1915, the first female police officers commenced duty, being Misses Lilian May Armfield (1884–1971) and Maude Marion Rhodes (–1956).

In 1961, the number of NSW Police had increased to 5,717 and by November 2008, it had increased to 15,354.

=== Bushrangers ===
After the formation of the NSW Police in 1862, the most serious crimes were committed by bushrangers, particularly during the Victorian gold rush years. Constable Byrne almost single-handedly fought off the Ben Hall gang when they attacked a gold escort at Majors Creek on 13 March 1865. Constable O'Grady was taken ill with cholera when, on 9 April 1866, he left his sick-bed to confront the Clarke gang, which was incorrectly renowned as being the "bloodiest bushrangers" of the colony of NSW and of Australia. Constable Walker was one of the earliest Australian-born mounted troopers to gain fame. He brought Captain Thunderbolt's enduring "bushranging" career to an end by shooting him near Uralla in New England, NSW.

Constable Ernest Charles Day (later the Inspector General of Police) showed courage under fire when he shot and captured bushranger Hobson, who was later executed by hanging. Day later investigated a string of murders involving a hawker, Tommy Moore, by tracing his activities to South Australia, solving one of Australia's earliest serial-killer cases.

=== 1894 – Arming ===
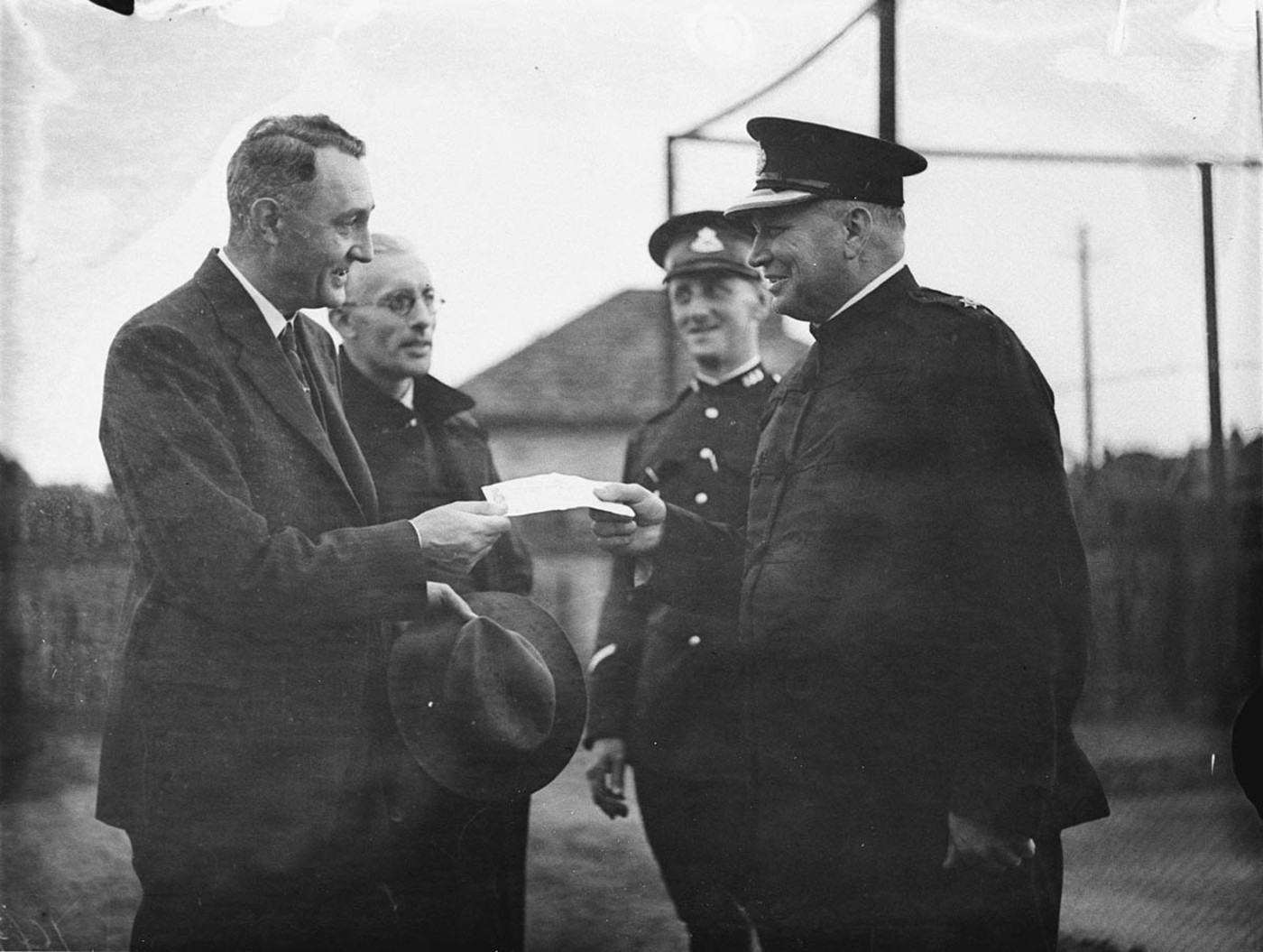
Police officers in 1934

In 1894, a number of unarmed police were seriously injured while attempting to arrest a group of offenders as they attempted to break open a safe in the Union Steamship Company Office in Bridge Street, Sydney. The incident received wide publicity and was known as "Bridge Street Affray".

Within 24 hours, the Premier announced that all Police would wear firearms at all times while on duty to prevent the escape of felons and to place them on an equal footing with armed criminals. Previously, only police in rural districts had been permitted to carry firearms.

Parliament subsequently passed legislation authorising the arming of all NSW Police and they have carried firearms since.

=== 1979 – Lusher Commission of Inquiry ===
In 1979, the NSW government of Neville Wran called on Justice Edwin Lusher, a judge of the Supreme Court of New South Wales to chair a commission of inquiry into police administration.

=== 1990s renamings ===
The Police Service Act 1990 replaced the Police Regulation Act. The NSW Police Force was renamed the NSW Police Service, which reflected "community-based policing at the time" of the Greiner government and the public's responsibility in crime control, aided by the police. In accordance with the Police Service Amendment (NSW Police) Bill in 2002, the New South Wales Police Service was then renamed again, to simply New South Wales Police. The then Minister for Police, Michael Costa, explains:

'NSW Police' is the name on which everybody signed off and it is the name with which we were to come to the Parliament... I do not believe we need the word 'service' in the name of the police force. I do not accept the argument that we need the word 'service' in a community-based policing approach.

In 2006, the Police Amendment (Miscellaneous) Bill resulted in a name change for the third time, renaming the New South Wales Police to New South Wales Police Force.

=== 1991 – Amalgamation of special security units ===
In June 1991, the State Protection Group (SPG) was formed, incorporating the former Special Weapons and Operations Section (SWOS), the Witness Security Unit, regional Tactical Response Groups and the Rescue Squad. The Security Management Branch and the Bomb Disposal Unit were later included in the group.

=== 1992 – Volunteering and NSW Police ===
After much debate, the NSW Parliament passed the Police Service (Volunteer Police) Amendment Act 1992, which sought to trial voluntary service within the police force, along the lines of the United Kingdom's special constabularies. The trial lapsed with the automatic repeal of the Act in 1994. The successor to this scheme was the Volunteers in Policing (VIP) program which restricts volunteer participation to non-core administration and community tasks, without enforcement duties or other powers being granted.

=== 1995 – Wood Royal Commission ===
The 1990s was a turbulent period in NSW Police history. A Commission of inquiry into the NSW Police was held between 1995 and 1997. The commission uncovered hundreds of instances of bribery, money laundering, drug trafficking, and falsifying of evidence by police. Then Police Commissioner Tony Lauer resigned as the level of corruption within the service became clear, and his own position became untenable. Peter James Ryan was recruited from the United Kingdom. Wide-ranging reforms occurred as a result of the recommendations of the Royal Commission, including the establishment of a permanent Police Integrity Commission. The royal commissioner was Justice James Roland Wood. The terms of reference were to look into systemic and entrenched corruption within the NSW Police, towards the end of the Royal Commission it also investigated alleged paedophile activities within the Police Service. Of particular note was the Detectives' Division of the Kings Cross patrol, of which almost all the senior ranks, including the chief detective, were involved in serious and organised corrupt activities, including taking regular bribes from major drug traffickers.

=== 2003 – Police bugging ===
In 2003, Strike Force Emblems was established in response to allegations that warrants were improperly obtained during Operation Mascot, an investigation into police corruption in the late 1990s. The warrants authorised a large number of people, mostly police officers, to have their private conversations 'bugged'. Nearly a decade later in October 2012, the New South Wales Government announced that the Ombudsman would investigate allegations concerning the conduct of officers in the NSW Police Force, the Crime Commission and the Police Integrity Commission in relation to the matters investigated in Strike Force Emblems which occurred between 1998 and 2002. The final hearings were not completed until 31 March 2015.

The Acting NSW Ombudsman, John McMillan's report to Parliament was tabled on 20 December 2016.

=== 2015 – Police headquarters shooting ===
On 2 October 2015, 15-year-old Iraqi-Kurdish boy Farhad Khalil Mohammad Jabar shot dead Curtis Cheng, a 58-year-old accountant who worked for the NSW Police Force, outside their Parramatta headquarters. The 15-year-old then shot at responding special constables, and died from their return gunfire. NSW Police commissioner Andrew Scipione said "We believe that his actions were politically motivated and therefore linked to terrorism". The attack appears to have similar motives to the 2014 Endeavour Hills stabbings.

== Organisation ==
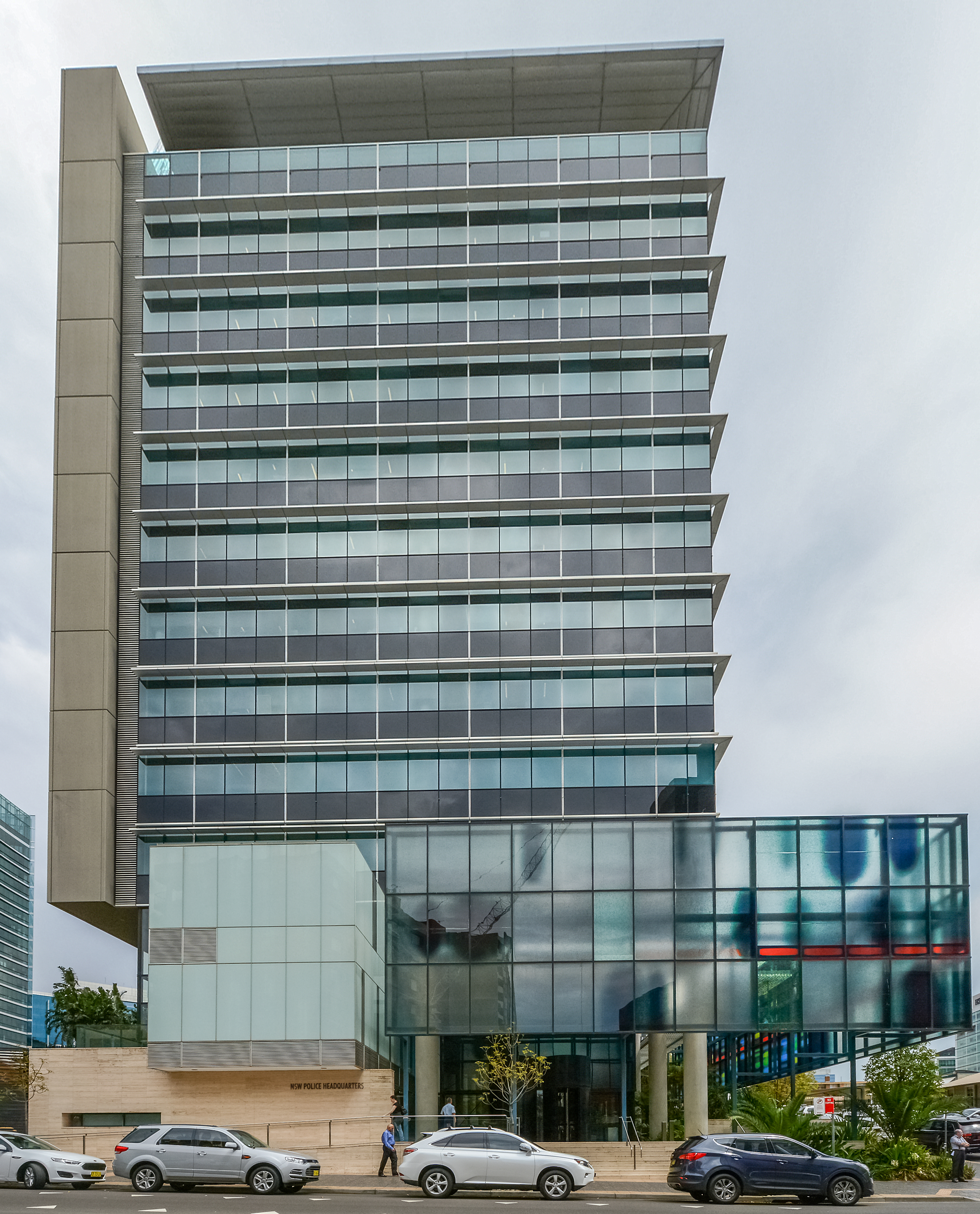
The current police headquarters in Parramatta

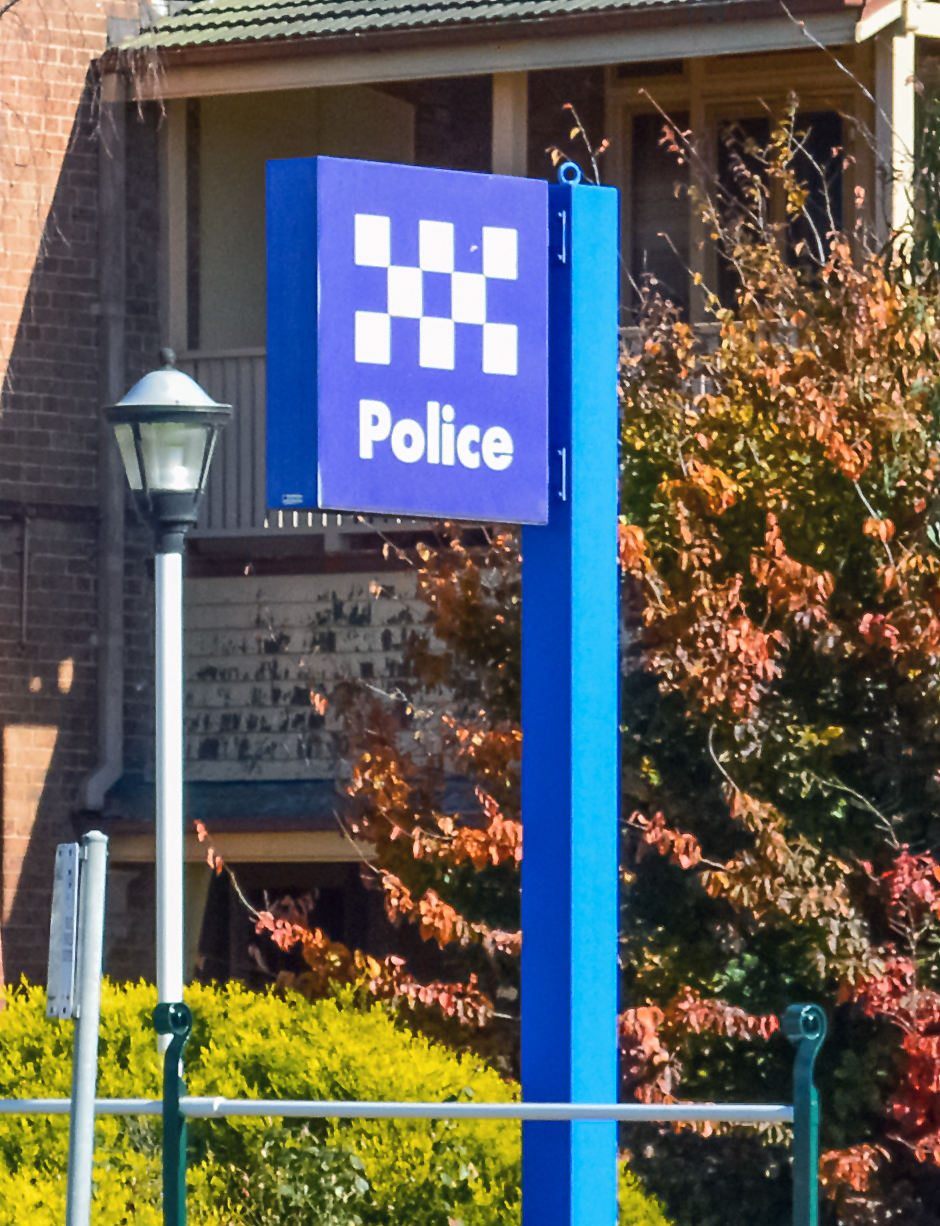
A standard police station sign

=== Leadership structure ===
The NSW Police headquarters is at 1 Charles Street, Parramatta, Sydney.

The current commissioner of the NSW Police is Mal Lanyon, APM. The Minister for Police, is responsible to the Parliament of New South Wales for the police portfolio.

NSW Police is split into four divisions, each overseen by a Deputy Commissioner.

=== Police Area Commands and Police Districts ===
The state's 432 police stations are organised into six Regions, which are then divided into Police Area Commands (PACs, consisting of metropolitan areas) and Police Districts (PDs, consisting of rural areas). Each region contains 7–12 PACs/PDs, which are listed by name and CAD prefix/vehicle ID.

Central Metropolitan Region
EB	Eastern Beaches PAC	ES	Eastern Suburbs PAC	IW	Inner West PAC	KX	Kings Cross PAC	LE	Leichhardt PAC	SSY	South Sydney PAC
SG	St George PAC	SH	Surry Hills PAC	SU	Sutherland PAC	SC	Sydney City PAC				
North West Metropolitan Region
BN	Blacktown PAC	BL	Blue Mountains PAC	HB	Hawkesbury PAC	KU	Ku-Ring-Gai PAC	MD	Mount Druitt PAC	NS	North Shore PAC
NB	Northern Beaches PAC	PA	Parramatta PAC	NEP	Nepean PAC	RI	Riverstone PAC	RY	Ryde PAC	HI	The Hills PAC
South West Metropolitan Region
AU	Auburn PAC	BK	Bankstown PAC	BU	Burwood PAC	CN	Camden PAC	CT	Campbelltown PAC	CA	Campsie PAC
CMB	Cumberland PAC	FA	Fairfield PAC	LP	Liverpool PAC						
Northern Region
BW	Brisbane Waters PD	CC	Coffs–Clarence PD	HV	Hunter Valley PD	LM	Lake Macquarie PD	MGL	Manning–Great Lakes PD	MNC	Mid North Coast PD
NCC	Newcastle City PD	PSH	Port Stephens–Hunter PD	RM	Richmond PD	TL	Tuggerah Lakes PD	TB	Tweed–Byron PD	CHR	Coffs Harbour PD
Southern Region
LI	Lake Illawarra PD	MN	Monaro PD	MRY	Murray River PD	MBG	Murrumbidgee PD	RIV	Riverina PD	SC	South Coast PD
HME	The Hume PD	WG	Wollongong PD								
Western Region
BR	Barrier PD	CEN	Central North PD	CW	Central West PD	CF	Chifley PD	ND	New England PD	OR	Orana–Mid Western PD
OX	Oxley PD										
Specialist Commands and Units
ACD	Academy	CIU	Crash Investigation Unit	CLM	Central Metro Region	DOG	Dog Squad	FLT	Fleet Trial Vehicle	FTC	Forensic Evidence & Technical Services
MTD	Mounted Unit	NTH	Northern Region	NWM	North West Metro Region	DM	Darling Mills Region	CE	City East Region	PDT	Police Driver Training
PORS	Public Order & Riot Squad	PTC	Police Transport Command	RBT	Random Breath Testing Unit	RDT	Random Drug Testing Unit	R/RES	Rescue Squad	SLP	School Liaison Police
STH	Southern Region	SWM	South West Metro Region	CSO	City South Region	TOU	Tactical Operations Unit	TRF	Traffic Group	WTN	Western Region
GWS	Greater Western Sydney Region	GR	Georges River Region	CMC	Coffs Mid-Coast Region						
Strike Forces
RAP	Strike Force Raptor	ODN	Strike Force Odin								

Note: Some specialist commands utilise specialist commands (often regions such as SWM and NWM respectively) as their registered callsign. Specialist commands such as Operational Support Group (OSG) use callsigns such as SWM512 and NWM511. Many units of the HVPT (High Visibility Policing Team) use more modern vehicles such as Volkswagen Tiguans and Kia Sorentos with NWM and SWM markings additionally.

== Specialist units ==
=== Police Transport & Public Safety Command ===
The Police Transport Command (PTC) is a high visibility proactive policing unit responsibility for dealing with crime and anti-social behaviour on the public transport network. PTC officers deploy across public transport based on criminal intelligence and targeting known hot spots, in addition to conducting operations during high traffic events. Modes of transport covered by PTC include trains, buses, ferries, taxis and light rail. PTC works closely on operations with other specialist commands, such as the Dog Unit, which assist in drug detection on public transport. PTC takes part in Project Servator, a policing project designed to disrupt criminal activity, including terrorism, while providing a reassuring Police presence for the public. Project Servator officers are specially trained to spot tell-tale signs that someone is planning or preparing to commit a crime, and work to empower the public to remain vigilant and report when they see something unusual or suspicious.

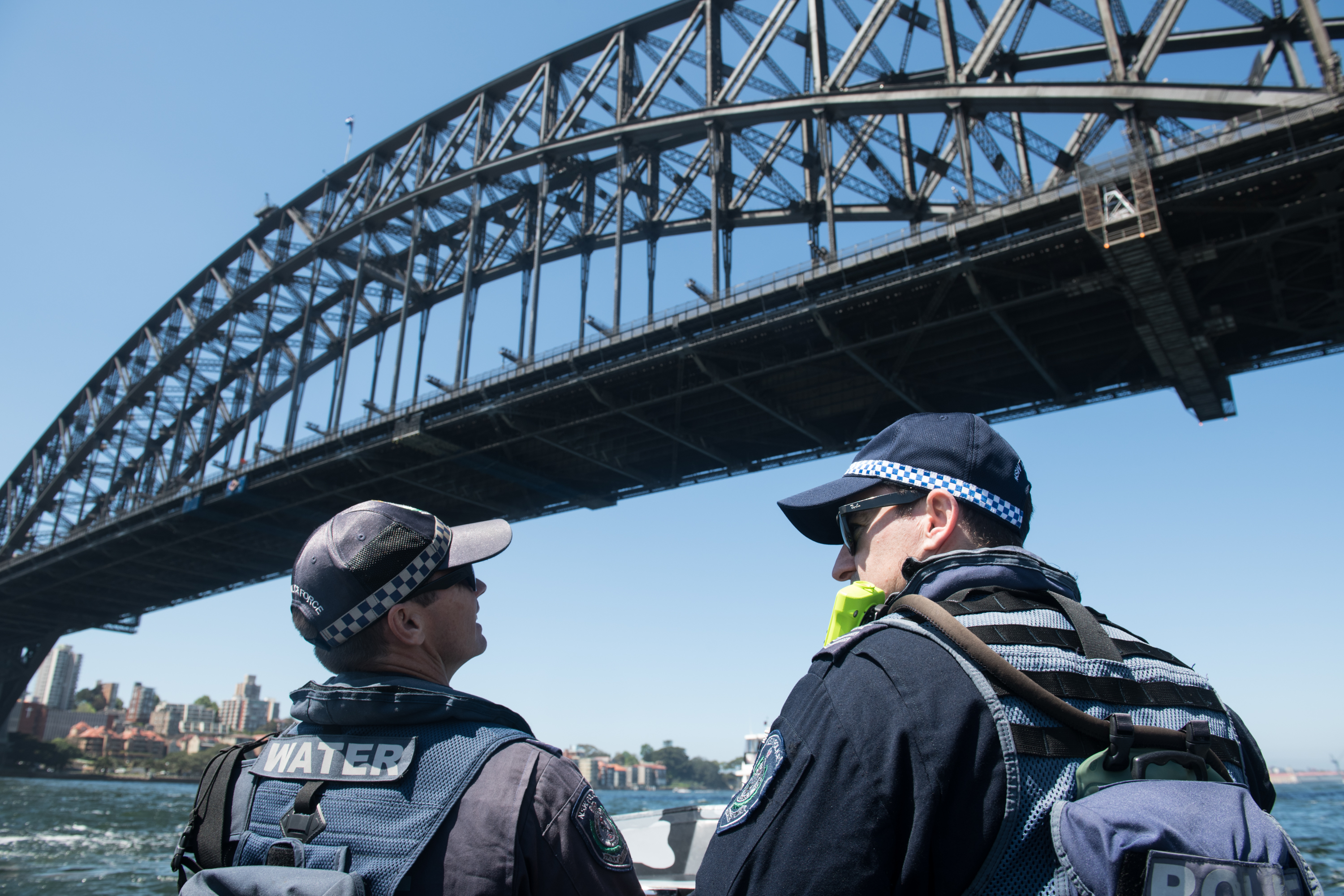
Marine Area Command officers on duty in Sydney Harbour

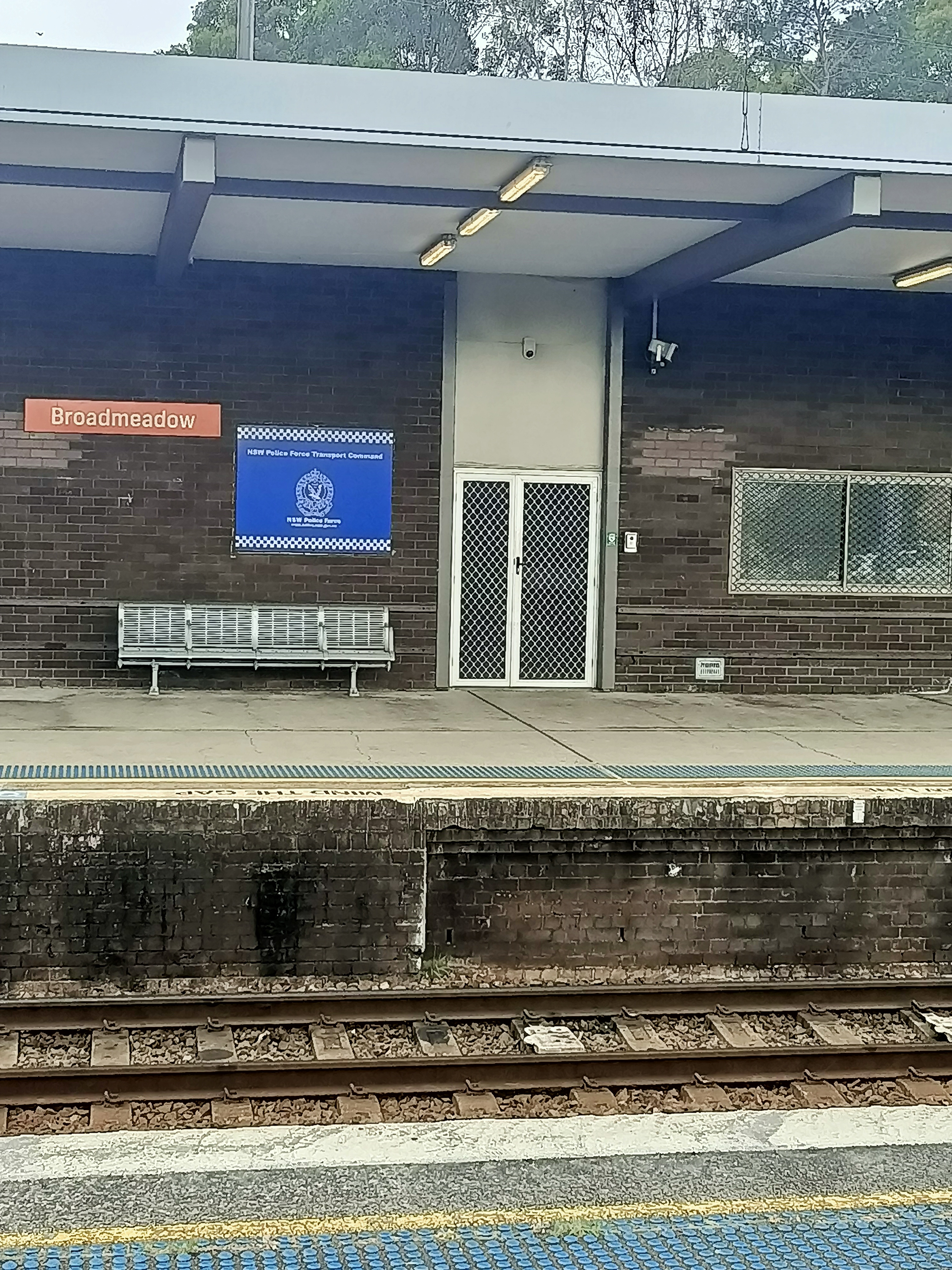
A local NSW police force command located on Broadmeadow train station.

=== The Marine Area Command (MAC) ===
The MAC is responsible for policing the waterways and coast of NSW. The MAC operates a fleet of over 50 vessels along the NSW coast, tasked with crime prevention and detection on waterways, overseeing aquatic events and controlling spectator craft, co-ordinating and conducting maritime search and rescue operations and enforcing safety and compliance among those on the water. The MAC is responsible for the waters up to 200 nautical miles off the NSW coast and operates 11 sea going vessels, including the OPV Nemesis the largest purpose built Police boat in the Southern Hemisphere. The MAC frequently conducts high visibility policing operations, utilising its road vehicles to transport police boats and jet skis to target locations, including inland waterways such as lakes and rivers. Police vessels and personnel are strategically located at important commercial and leisure ports with the base at Balmain on Sydney Harbour. You can find the water police at Broken Bay, Newcastle, Coffs Harbour, Botany Bay, Port Stephens, Eden and Port Kembla. Some remote country waterways are serviced by their Local Area Commands. They also have a Marine Operations Support Team (MOST) which conducts specialist marine operations such as marine security and ship boarding at major events. Police Divers conduct SCUBA operations, primarily conducting search and recovery operations for important evidence and missing persons.

=== The Aviation Command ===
Commonly referred to as PolAir, operates a fleet of eight aircraft that support policing from the air. Operations conducted by PolAir include aerial patrols, tracking of offenders (including vehicle and foot pursuits), searching for missing persons (including suspects, the elderly, children and bushwalkers), searching for missing vessels and aircraft, conducting rescue missions (including water rescues with their trained rescue swimmers), providing air cover for major events and incidents, aerial surveillance, aerial speed enforcement, reconnaissance, counter-terrorism operations and transporting specialist Police elements and equipment. Aircraft are equipped with advanced integrated technology systems including high-definition cameras, forward looking infra red (FLIR) cameras, 30 million candle power search lights, live video downlink capability, night vision goggles and advanced navigation programs. The fleet consists of five helicopters (3x Bell 429, 2x Bell 412EPI) and three fixed-wing aircraft (3x Cessna 208).

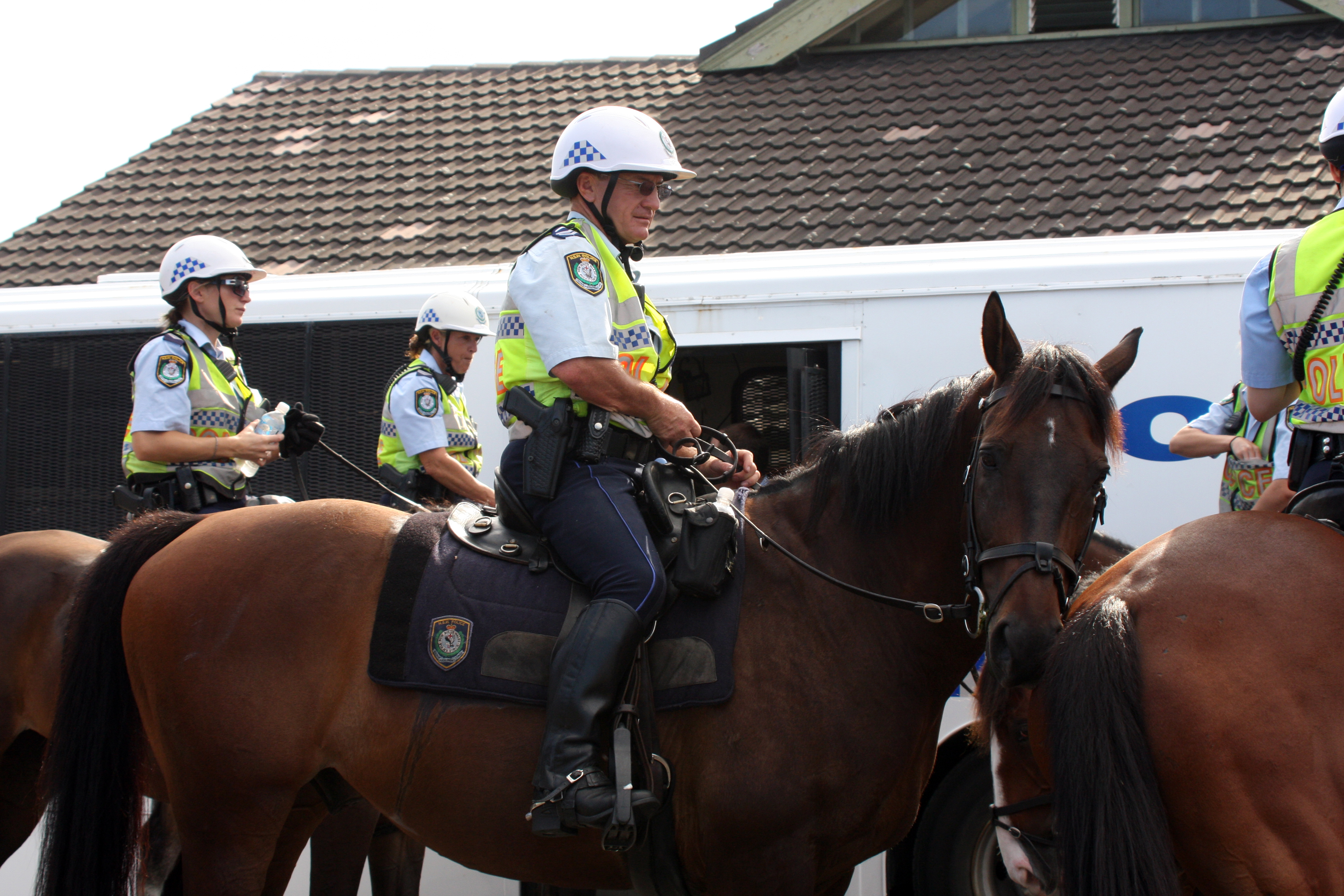
Mounted Unit officers on patrol at a festival

=== The Mounted Unit ===
Commonly referred to as the “Mounted Police”, they conduct policing operations on horseback. The unit operates 34 horses, providing crowd management at major events, supporting Police during civil unrest and public order incidents, conducting search missions over tough terrain and general police patrols. The unit also conducts ceremonial duties.

=== The Dog Unit ===
Commonly referred to as the Dog Squad, provides specialist canines to support policing duties. General Purpose Dogs are used to support typical front line policing operations, with common tasks including tracking offenders, searching for evidence, searching for missing persons, supporting police officers in dangerous situations and conducting high visibility foot patrols in busy areas and at major events. The unit also utilises several different types of dogs for a number of specialist roles including:

- Tactical Dogs
- Blood Hounds
- Cadaver Dogs
- Drug Detection Dogs
- Explosive and Firearm Detection Dogs
- Urban Search and Rescue Dogs

=== School Liaison Police (SLP) ===
Works with high schools to reduce youth crime, violence and anti-social behaviour through a range of school intervention strategies, educational programs and local relationships that model respect and responsibility. Officers develop and present programs in conjunction with teaching staff and act as a central point of contact on Police, community and school issues. SLP officers may provide information, support and guidance on security, intervention strategies and child protection matters relating to the school as well as other issues relating to safety and community responsibility.

=== The Rescue and Bomb Disposal Unit (RBDU) ===
Provides specialized emergency support to Police activities. Its capabilities include conducting rescue operations, accessing and restraining suicidal persons and illegal demonstrators in precarious situations such as atop buildings, co-ordination of land searches for missing persons, conducting complex body recoveries (such as people down cliffs) and crime scene support, including scene preservation, evidence protection and assisting investigators with logistics such as lighting and tents. The RBDU also provides the Police Force's bomb squad capability.

=== The Public Order and Riot Squad (PORS) ===
Provides a surge capacity to support Police operations, as well as a number of specialist support functions. Riot officers operate in squads of three to four, from specially equipped black four wheel drive vehicles. They are deployed across NSW on a regular needs basis. Its primary roles include crowd control, riot control, executing moderate risk search warrants, missing persons searches, evidence searches, disaster victim identification (DVI), chemical, biological and radiological response, searches for explosive devices, high visibility policing at major events such as festivals and sports games, conducting high-impact police operations in known trouble spots for violence such as Kings Cross, and assisting at incidents in correctional facilities. The squad moves freely around the city throughout the day, travelling to hot spot areas as they flare up. The squad is now equipped with M4 assault rifles to conduct counter terrorism patrols. After specialist training they can provide a first response capability to active shooter and terror incidents.

=== State Protection Group ===
The State Protection Group (SPG) is part of the Counter Terrorism & Special Tactics Command of the New South Wales Police Force and was established in 1991 to deal with extraordinary policing responses. The SPG directly supports police in high-risk incidents such as sieges with specialized tactical, negotiation, intelligence and command-support services. The unit also provides rescue and bomb disposal support, canine policing, and armoury services.

=== Tactical Operations Unit (TOU) ===
TOU is the State’s most elite police unit, responsible for the most dangerous and high risk police operations in New South Wales. The unit is equipped with specialist firearms including submachine guns, rifles and shotguns, along with specialist equipment and vehicles such as armored Chevrolet vans and Lenco BearCat armoured vehicles. Their roles include high risk search warrants, the arrests of armed and dangerous criminals, dealing with active armed offenders, containing and resolving siege situations, dealing with complex situations such as barricaded suspects, hostage takings and hijackings and conducting counter-terrorism operations. The unit is sometimes supported by the Tactical Operations Regional Support (TORS) unit, which provides a part-time tactical response capability in the regional areas of the state, made up of regular officers who receive equal high level tactical operations training and equipment. There are a number of specialist roles within the unit including TOU Snipers and Intelligence Officers.

=== Tactical Operations Regional Support (TORS) ===
It provides specialist support to the Tactical Operations Unit in resolving high-risk incidents in regional New South Wales. Comprising part-time tactical operatives from non-metropolitan areas. While primarily a regional resource, TORS can be deployed throughout the State to assist the Tactical Operations Unit. TORS teams are equipped with a range of specialist tactical gear including less than lethal munitions such as Tasers, beanbags as well as various shotguns and M4/M16 Assault rifles. The TOU is responsible for the initial selection and training of TORS applicants, followed up by monthly local training and an annual TOU re-certification camp. TORS officers also attend different training camps organized by Tactical Operations Unit to maintain their training levels. The range of skills TORS operators are required to possess are efficiency in bushcraft and navigation, close quarter tactics, entry methods, ballistic shield operations, cordon and perimeter operations, advanced weapons training, and less than lethal tactics.

=== The Negotiations Unit ===
Provides specialist negotiators responsible for negotiating with suicidal and emotionally disturbed persons, extortion/kidnapping situations, escapees, barricaded offenders, sieges and hostage situations. Expert and trained negotiators are on call across the State when needed be Negotiators work hand in hand with other units of the State Protection Group in order to resolve incidents diplomatically.

=== The Protection Operations Unit (POU) ===
Coordinates security operations within NSW for Internationally Protected Persons and public dignitaries considered to be at risk. Within the POU is the Witness Security Group, which is responsible for the security and protection of key witnesses, including the operation of safe houses.

=== The Drug and Firearms Squad ===
conducts investigations into organised criminal networks involved in the supply, distribution and production of illicit drugs and firearms.

=== The Criminal Groups Squad and Strike Force Raptor ===
target groups and individuals who engage in serious and organised crime, in particular those who have a propensity for violence. This is achieved with proactive investigations and intelligence-based, high-impact policing operations with the intention of preventing and disrupting conflicts, and prosecuting and dismantling networks engaged in serious criminal activity.

=== The Organised Crime Squad ===
targets high level organised crime, disrupting its activities, identifying the people and groups involved in organised crime groups and effecting their arrest. This includes targeting organised criminal activity connected with licensed casinos, the racing industry and money laundering activities.

=== The Cybercrime Squad ===
is responsible for investigating cyber-enabled and cyber-dependent crime. The squad investigates complex cyber offences requiring advanced technical skill and capability, and processes all reports received through the Reportcyber portal, determining the appropriate course of action.

=== The Homicide Squad ===
is responsible for homicide investigations, including the investigation of murders, suspicious deaths, coronial investigations and critical incidents.

=== The Child Abuse and Sex Crimes Squad ===
is responsible for investigating sex crimes that are protracted, complex, serial and serious in nature along with the physical and sexual abuse and neglect of children under 16. The squad maintains a Child Protection Register and support local Police investigations, as well as working closely with other local, federal and international law enforcement agencies.

=== The Financial Crimes Squad ===
is responsible for investigating fraud, identity crime, motor vehicle theft/re-birthing (including precious and scrap metal theft) and arson (including structural and bushfires).

=== The Robbery and Serious Crime Squad ===
is responsible for investigating robbery, extortion, kidnap for ransom, product contamination and other serious property crime, including major break in offences on commercial premises.

=== NSW Undercover Branch ===
The NSW Police Undercover Branch is a highly secretive specialist unit within the New South Wales Police Force responsible for conducting covert operations against serious and organized crime. Its officers operate under assumed identities, often for extended periods, to infiltrate criminal networks, gather intelligence, and obtain evidence such as confessions or illicit transactions.

Undercover operatives are trained to convincingly adopt false personas ranging from drug dealers and hitmen to criminals seeking illegal services, in order to gain the trust of targets. Their work includes infiltrating drug syndicates, organized crime groups, and child exploitation networks, as well as undertaking “decoy,” “hitman,” and homicide-related operations aimed at eliciting admissions from suspects.

The unit is characterized by strict secrecy, with operatives identities protected by law and often unknown even within the wider police force, its headquarters are also a mystery with few police even knowing its location. Officers may maintain multiple cover identities, supported by official documentation, and are required to sustain detailed backstories to ensure credibility.

Selection for the Branch is competitive, and designed to prepare officers for high-risk covert operations. Candidates must already be serving police officers and undergo psychological, medical, and aptitude assessments before acceptance. Initial training begins with a Street-Level Operatives course, where officers learn the fundamentals of undercover work, including drug terminology, pricing, and basic covert interaction techniques. Many recruits have no prior exposure to illicit environments, so they are trained to recognize substances, understand criminal slang, and conduct low-level controlled purchases. Successful candidates may progress to an intensive live-in training program held at a secure location. During this phase, trainees develop full cover identities and are subjected to prolonged role-play scenarios, sometimes lasting up to 18 hours a day. These exercises are designed to simulate real-world encounters, including high-pressure questioning, unexpected changes in plans, and situations where their identity is challenged.

Training emphasizes, role-playing and deception skills, including maintaining believable cover stories, situational awareness and risk assessment, interpersonal skills, such as reading behavior and building trust with targets, and adaptability under pressure, including responding to threats or suspicion. Recruits are evaluated on their ability to remain composed, think quickly, and convincingly sustain their undercover persona. Poor performance, such as hesitation, inconsistent stories, or unnatural behavior can result in removal from the program. After completing training, officers may work as part-time “pool undercovers” on shorter operations before being selected for the Undercover Branch itself, where they undertake long-term, complex assignments. Due to the psychological demands of the role, undercover officers also undergo ongoing mental health assessments, and their time in the unit is typically limited before returning to standard policing duties.

=== Traffic and Highway Patrol Command ===
The Highway Patrol is responsible for road policing across the state, with the aim to minimise road trauma, promote orderly and safe road use, and ensure the free flow of traffic. Highway Patrol duties include patrols targeting driving behaviour, speed enforcement, registration enforcement, ensuring vehicles are safe and roadworthy, conducting random drug and alcohol testing (both during traffic stops and at dedicated roadside checkpoints), working with the Transport Management Centre to manage traffic during incidents, maintaining urgent road closures (such as during emergencies like bushfires), conducting emergency escorts for ambulances transporting critically injured patients (done in conjunction with the Transport Management Centre to provide a ‘green light corridor’), conducting urgent organ transports (typically between hospitals and airports) and leading vehicle pursuits within the Safe Driver Policy.

=== Traffic Strike Force ===
Targets specific aspects of road safety across the state, supporting local Highway Patrol in targeted patrols and operations. The strike force provides a surge capacity where Police can saturate specific areas with patrols based on intelligence and local requests, along with providing the ability to conduct large scale traffic operations such as mass random breath and drug testing. The strike force also conducts long term operations such as Operation Free Flow and Operation Mercury, targeting main arterial roads.

=== The Traffic Support Group (TSG) ===
Consists of a small task force of police motorcyclists, with the primary objective of providing VIP escort services for visiting dignitaries and heads of state. The group are also deployed in a similar manner to the Traffic Strike Force, where bikes are sent out into areas across the road network where required, where they target road safety issues along with specific offences such as the use of mobile phones while driving. The group also assist in providing medical escorts.

=== Traffic Task Force (TTF) ===
Is a specialist Highway Patrol Task Force which targets heavy vehicle safety and compliance. The team operates closely with Transport for NSW Heavy Vehicle Inspectors, conducting proactive operations where heavy vehicles are stopped and inspected by Police and RMS at random roadside inspection points. They also operate in response to serious heavy vehicle incidents, conducting raids and blitz inspectors of bus and trucking yards of companies following serious and fatal crashess involving their heavy vehicles.

Strike Force Puma (SF Puma)targets high-risk drivers who display extreme and erratic behaviours, and those with a history of licence and drink/drug driving offences, who pose the highest risk to the community on the road. In a similar manner to how repeat domestic violence and drug offenders are targeted by dedicated Police units, the Strike Force targets high-risk drivers with a known dangerous history and multiple repeat offences. The team also investigates video footage obtained by Police of dangerous driving from sources such as social media and dash cams.

=== Crash Investigation Unit (CIU) ===
Provides expertise in motor vehicle crash investigations, particularly crashes involving criminal offences. The unit attends and investigates fatal crashes resulting in death or where death is likely and serious crashes where criminal charges are likely. Other types of crashes investigated include those where the responsible party cannot be determined, serious crashes where a driver has fled the scene, serious crashes where an on duty Police officer is involved and other major incidents of unusual nature such as bus crashes.

=== Forensic Evidence & Technical Services Command ===
The Forensic Evidence & Technical Services Command (FETSC) has over 900 Police and civilian staff to provide high quality forensic and technical services to assist investigations, prevent and disrupt crime, protect the community and serve the justice system. Some of the capabilities provided by the Command include:

- Collection and analysis of physical and electronic evidence at crime and incident scenes.
- Scientific analysis, interpretation of evidence and presentation of evidence to courts.
- Identification of persons through biometric means, fingerprints and DNA to assist in criminal, incident and coronial investigations.
- Identification of persons through criminal history to provide background information to the courts to inform decisions.
- Criminal record and fingerprint-based background checking to assist in placing the 'right persons' in the 'right places' for specific jobs, visas and adoptions, to name a few.
- Provision of forensic intelligence to assist solving crime across boundaries; linking crimes across different evidence types.
- Provision of advice and logistical support to the NSW Police response to chemical, biological, radiological, nuclear and explosive incidents and Disaster Victim Identification events.
- Facilitation of targeted research and innovative development opportunities in collaboration with other forensic and educational institutions

=== Police Prosecutions Command ===
Police Prosecutors are responsible for conducting the majority of criminal prosecutions in summary jurisdiction courts on behalf of the police and various government agencies. Police prosecutors handle approximately 95% of such cases and maintain a consistently high success rate. In addition to courtroom advocacy, they provide support to victims of domestic and family violence and offer continuous legal advice to police officers across all ranks.

=== Prosecution Operations ===
This unit oversees the day-to-day prosecution of criminal matters in local courts. Prosecutors present cases, manage legal proceedings, and provide guidance on evidentiary and procedural matters.

=== Coroners Court ===
Police prosecutors assist the State Coroner during inquests, contributing to the investigation of deaths and supporting broader policing operations with legal expertise in complex or serious matters.

=== Operational Legal Advice Unit ===
This unit delivers specialist legal advice to frontline officers on a wide range of issues. It also undertakes legal research to identify and address gaps, inconsistencies, or emerging challenges within existing laws.

=== Covert Applications Unit ===
The Covert Applications Unit provides legal guidance on applications for surveillance warrants, including listening devices and telecommunications interception. It assists in drafting supporting affidavits and advises on the lawful use of covert investigative techniques. The unit also supports controlled operations and extradition matters.

=== Executive Legal Support Unit ===
This unit offers high-level legal advice to the NSW Police Force executive. Its responsibilities include reviewing legislative proposals, cabinet-related documents, and external communications, as well as advising on internal policies, procedures, and standard operating guidelines.

=== Prosecutor Training Unit ===
Responsible for educating and preparing trainee prosecutors through structured programs. Completion of the Prosecutor Education Program is a long-standing requirement for appointment as a police prosecutor.

=== Brief Managers and Court Processes Unit ===
This unit manages legal projects aimed at improving court processes, legal systems, and service-wide education initiatives, as well as contributing to the strategic development of prosecution practices.

=== Professional Development Network ===
Designed to ensure ongoing competency, this network includes a Professional Development Coordinator and supporting officers who facilitate continued training and knowledge enhancement for prosecutors.

=== Professional Standards Command ===
The Professional Standards Command (PSC) is a specialist unit within the New South Wales Police Force that reports to the Deputy Commissioner for Investigations and Counter Terrorism. It is responsible for maintaining and promoting standards of conduct, integrity, and performance across the organisation.

The PSC’s primary objectives include strengthening professional standards, investigating serious allegations involving police officers, including criminal conduct, corruption, and other high-risk matters, and identifying patterns of behavior or systemic risks that may contribute to misconduct. The command also supports the consistent and effective management of personnel.

To achieve these objectives, the PSC undertakes a range of functions. It provides advice and review services in relation to investigations, critical incidents, complaint handling, and workforce management. The command applies investigative and intelligence resources based on risk assessment and prioritisation, ensuring that the most serious matters receive appropriate attention.

The PSC also develops and uses intelligence to support integrity systems, including conducting audits, analysing trends, assessing probity concerns, and undertaking strategic research. In addition, it contributes to the development of policies, standard operating procedures, training programs, and guidance materials aimed at reinforcing best practice and professional conduct.

The command serves as a key liaison point between the NSW Police Force and external oversight and partner agencies, including the Law Enforcement Conduct Commission (LECC), the NSW Coroner, the Independent Commission Against Corruption (ICAC), and the Office of the Children’s Guardian.

=== Police Armoury ===
The Police Armoury was established in 1872 and provides specialist engineering services, maintenance and supply of ammunition, firearms and weapons systems for the NSW Police Force.

=== NSW Police Band ===
The NSW Police Band was established in 1895 and is the longest-serving uniformed concert band in Australia. It today incorporates 10 different ensembles used for different activities. It is one of only two full-time police bands in Australia.

=== NSW Police Pipe Band ===
The NSW Police pipe band, founded in 1946, is an auxiliary unit of the Police band. Its first formal engagement was the Newcastle Centenary Celebrations in September 1947. During the early 1990s, the band was shut down as a cost cutting measure. Many ex-members went on to reform the band in an informal capacity during the ANZAC Day march in the early 1990s. It has participated in events such as the Royal Edinburgh Military Tattoo in Sydney. It is also stilled called upon to perform at attestation parades and national police Remembrance Day.

== Uniform and equipment ==
=== Field and service dress uniforms ===
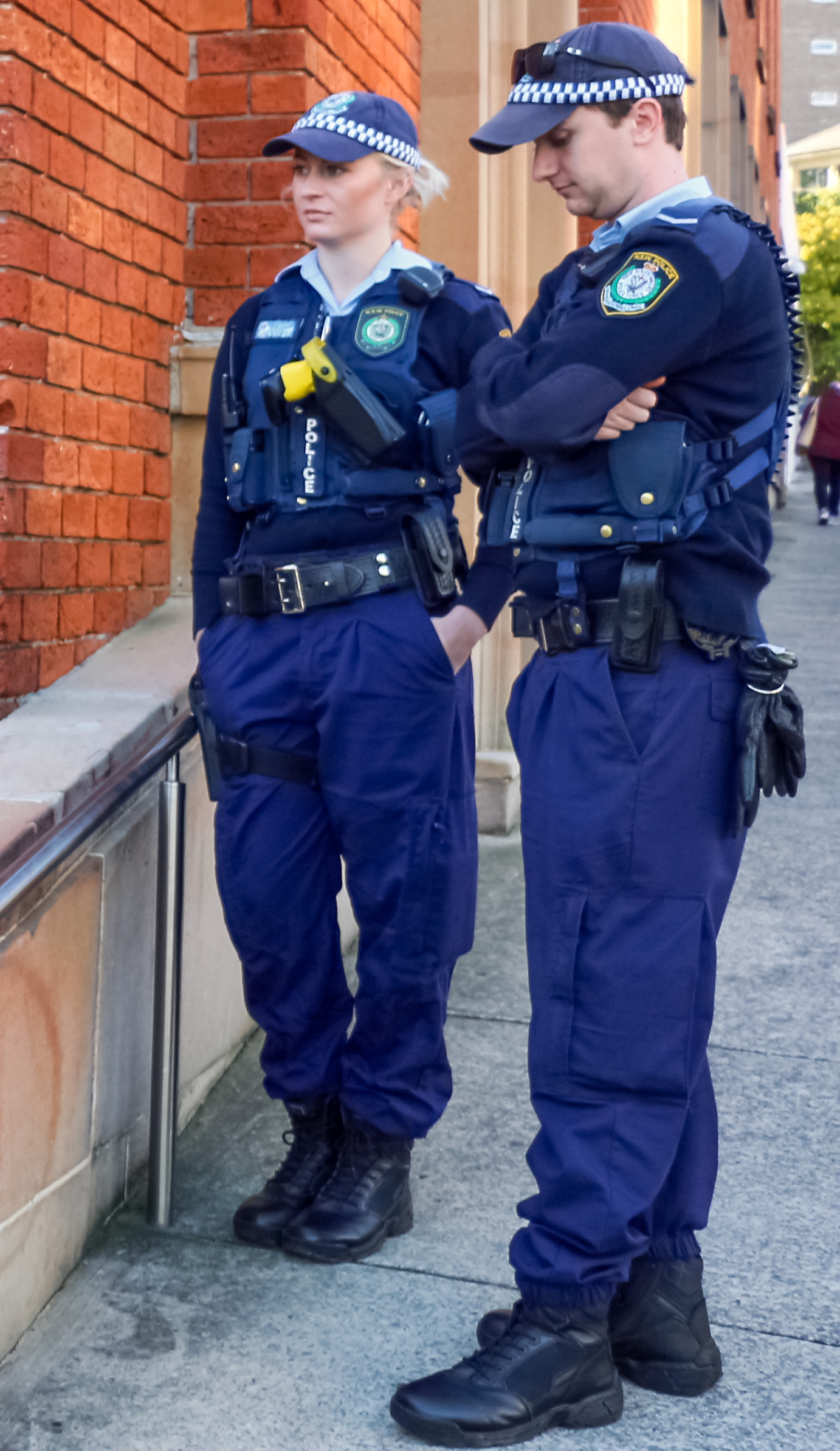
Officers in field dress

NSW Police general duties police wear an operational (field dress) or ceremonial (service dress) uniform.

Field dress consists of navy blue cargo pants with map pockets, bloused at the bottom, light blue marle short- or long-sleeve shirt, navy blue baseball cap with blue and white Sillitoe tartan and black general purpose boots. An iLAV (Individual Light Armored Vest) can also worn, carrying various equipment such as body cameras, pepper spray, batons and radio. During winter a navy blue polar fleece jacket or leather jacket is worn. Ranks are worn on the shoulders by both NCOs and commissioned ranks. All officers are also supplied with high-visibility vests and raincoats that can be worn over other uniform.

Service dress consists of straight leg navy blue trousers, blue marle shirt, antron peak cap/hat and leather duty jacket and black general purpose boots. Depending on rank, members may be issued with high-shine polishable lace-up leather boots for ceremonial occasions. When attending courts, NSW Police usually wear the full-service dress.

NSW Police College staff, protocol and field protocol officers generally wear a navy blue ceremonial tunic during formal occasions such as attestation parades (passing out parades), medal ceremonies and funerals. Field protocol officers wear a light blue/navy blue lanyard over the right shoulder and tucked into the right pocket during ceremonial occasions. Full-time protocol officers and members of the VIP cyclists are entitled to wear a black basketweave Sam Browne belt during ceremonial occasions.

The current shoulder patch for uniform reads "New South Wales Police Force" and has a redesigned and re-coloured eagle.

=== Specialist and special event uniforms ===
Specialist units such as the Public Order and Riot Squad, Homicide Squad, Marine Area Command and the State Protection Group Tactical Operations Unit all have different uniform needs and are outfitted accordingly such as Rescue and Bomb Disposal Unit with their white overalls, Tactical Operations Unit (TOU) with black and Dog Squad with subdued blue. Detectives wear plain clothes.

For black tie or formal dinners/dances, NSW Police can wear mess dress with mess kit, consisting of dark navy-blue trousers and mess jacket with cobalt blue cuffs, epaulettes (with ranks) and lapels.

During ANZAC Day marches and United Nations Day marches in Sydney, NSW Police who have served with the Australian Federal Police in United Nations peacekeeping operations wear the United Nations blue beret and full-sized medals.

=== Name plates and identification ===
Each police officer is issued an identification metal badge with a Warrant Card. Behind the Police badge, a member has a coloured plastic backing card that helps identify a member's rank in the force, namely:

- light blue – Constable or Senior Constable
- dark blue – Sergeant or Senior Sergeant
- red – Inspector or Chief Inspector
- green – Superintendent or Chief Superintendent
- white – Assistant Commissioner, Deputy Commissioner or Commissioner

This colour-coding also occurs on members' name plates. For administrative officers of all grades and Special Constables, their name plates are gold. Volunteers in Policing wear black nameplates. Civilian staff are not issued with badges except for Special Constables who are issued a metal wallet badge with a gold plastic backing board. Special Constables and civilian forensics staff are also issued with warrant cards. Everyone else such as plainclothes police officers is issued an Identification Certificate (Identification Card).

=== Arms and appointments ===
==== Firearms ====
Members of the NSW Police are issued with the full-size 9x19mm Parabellum Glock 17 Semi-Automatic pistol, as well as the Glock 19 and 26 compact and subcompact variants respectively for some specialist sections and plain clothes officers. As of 2024, these 9x19mm Glock versions began replacing the previously issued .40 Smith & Wesson full-size Glock 22, compact 23, and sub-compact 27 Semi-Automatic pistols. The .38 caliber Smith & Wesson Model 10 was formerly standard issue, before the work of Task Force ALPHA 1992 and the research testing and report done by senior constable Darren Stewart, who recommended the introduction of the Glock 22 and its variants. Members are also issued with a spare magazine for their pistol due to the murder of two officers, armed with 6 shot revolvers, at Crescent Head in 1995 when officers carried the Smith & Wesson Model 10 in .38 Special. Specialist tactical units such as the full-time Tactical Operations Unit (and part-time regional State Protection Support Units) are equipped with a variety of specialised firearms for their duties. The Public Order and Riot Squad are issued with a variety of specialist equipment for their roles including Colt M4 Carbines.

==== Equipment and holsters ====
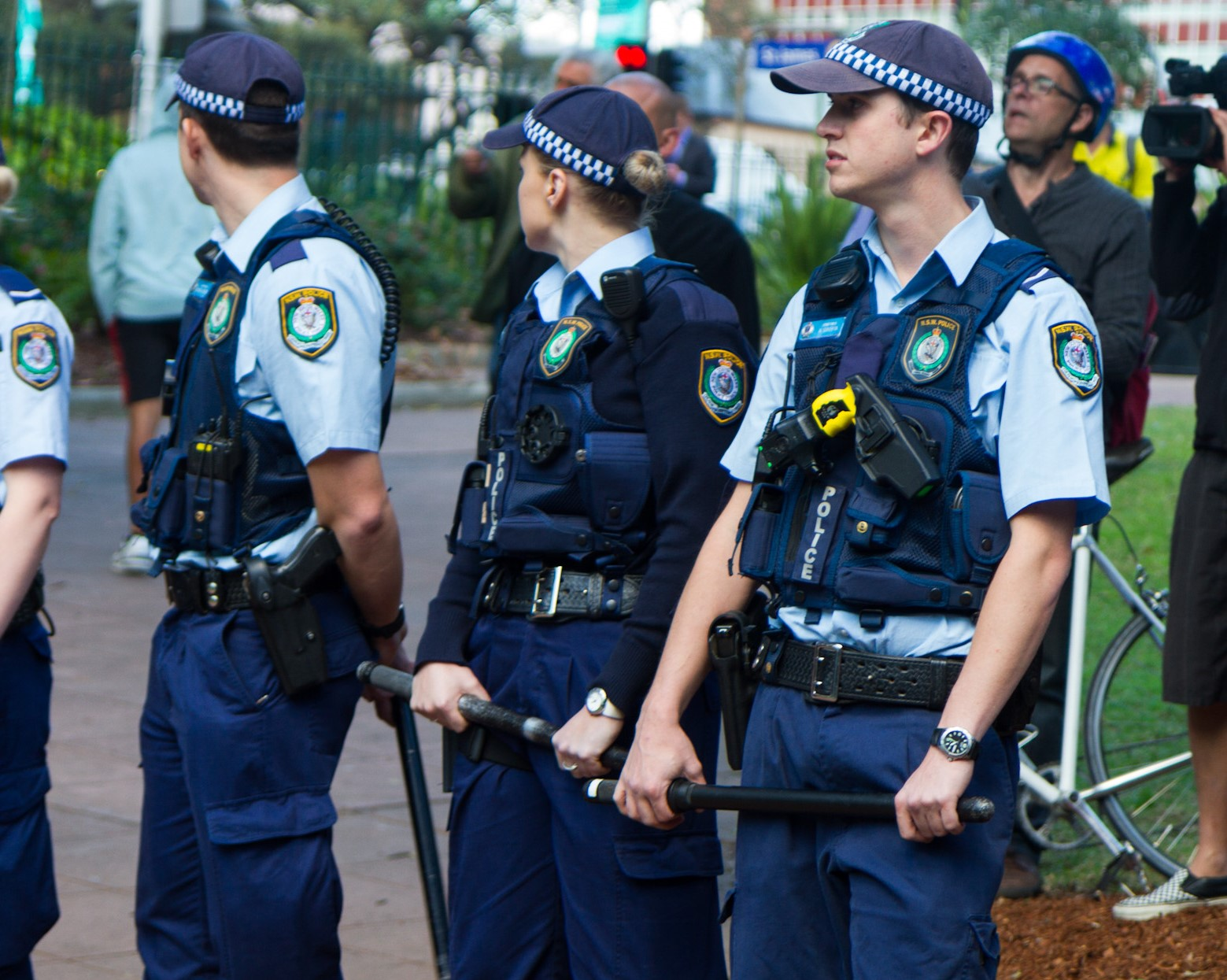
NSW Police officers at a protest

In addition to the standard issue firearm, officers are issued with Saflock (mark IV & V) handcuffs, OC (oleoresin capsicum spray), ASP expandable baton, Motorola APX6000 (digital encrypted UHF) or Tait Orca (VHF) portable radio, and a first-aid kit. Members have access to a fixed baton and Maglite rechargeable torch, which are usually located in all first response Police vehicles for each officer "on the truck". There is also access to high ballistic rated overt body armour in every vehicle as required. Specialist tactical officers from elite units such as the State Protection Group and riot officers from the Public Order and Riot Squad have access to a variety of specialised weapons and equipment.

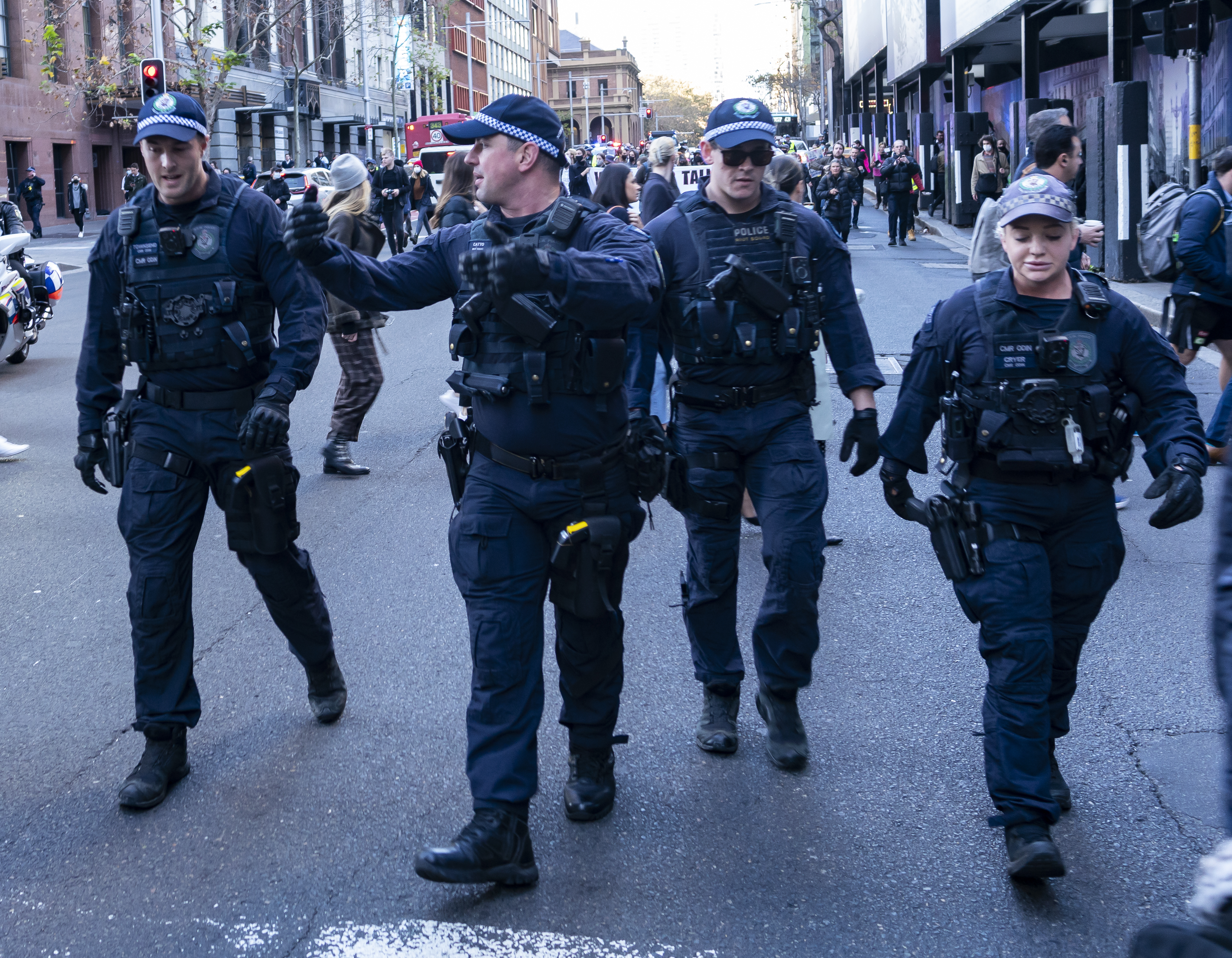
Riot squad officers

NSW Police has issued TASER electronic control devices (ECDs) which generally are carried by one officer on every first response general duties vehicle. TASER is also issued to some specialist squads (e.g. Public Order and Riot Squad, Tactical Operations Unit and Tactical Operations Regional Support). Each Taser X26P issued to Police includes an integrated camera to record all deployments of the device as well as any additional video while the device's safety is switched off. The grip used by police may result in no video footage being available; however, audio footage is still "loud and clear". This is due, for safety reasons, to the grip being the same as that used to hold the glock pistol.

The majority of officers carry their equipment on a leather or cordura duty appointment belt. In recent times, there has been a large movement within the police to implement changes in methods of equipment carry to relieve officers with back injuries. This has ranged from trials of lightweight nylon duty belts (such as the shapeshifter "gel belt"), to thigh holsters for firearms and load-bearing equipment vests. As of 2010, the load-bearing vest has become increasingly prevalent among general duty officers and it is anticipated that this trend will continue. It is believed that the vests are effective in relieving officers of chronic back pain, as it takes most of the weight away from the waist and back area, and distributes it across the frontal area of the officer's torso. In 2017, a new load-bearing vest was introduced the Integrated Light Armour Vest (ILAV) that is level 2 ballistic rated and level 2 stab resistance rated which can be worn without armour and has the option of a hydration pack and a backpack. Also in 2017, a new covert vest was introduced the Covert Light Armour Vest (CLAV).

== Fleet ==
=== Vehicles ===
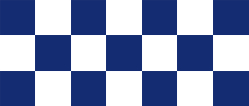
Blue and white Sillitoe tartan features on the livery of NSWPF vehicles

NSW Police has the largest government fleet in Australia, with more than 4,000 vehicles, on a lease basis. Historically, the Holden Commodore, Ford Falcon and Ford Territory traditionally made up the bulk of general duties response vehicles in the fleet. However, the general duties fleet now consists of Volkswagen Passats, Volkswagen Tiguans, Kia Sorentos and Hyundai Santa Fe's. A small number of Toyota LandCruiser 300s and Mitsubishi Pajeros are also used as response vehicles in regional areas. The Ford Ranger, Isuzu D-Max and Hyundai iLoad are used as caged vehicles or "paddy wagons", while Volkswagen Tiguan Allspaces are used as Dog Unit vehicles.

Highway Patrol vehicles usually consist of a combination of marked and unmarked vehicles, including the BMW 530d, BMW X5 and a smaller number of Toyota LandCruiser 200 for regional areas.

A large fleet of road motorcycles are also used, consisting of the BMW R1250RT and Yamaha FJR1300. A small number of trail bikes are also used for off-road duty. Other specialist sections and units use a variety of vehicles including Iveco Daily and Mercedes-Benz Sprinter vans, along with a range of Isuzu trucks as specialist rescue and bomb disposal vehicles and seven Lenco BearCat armoured trucks.

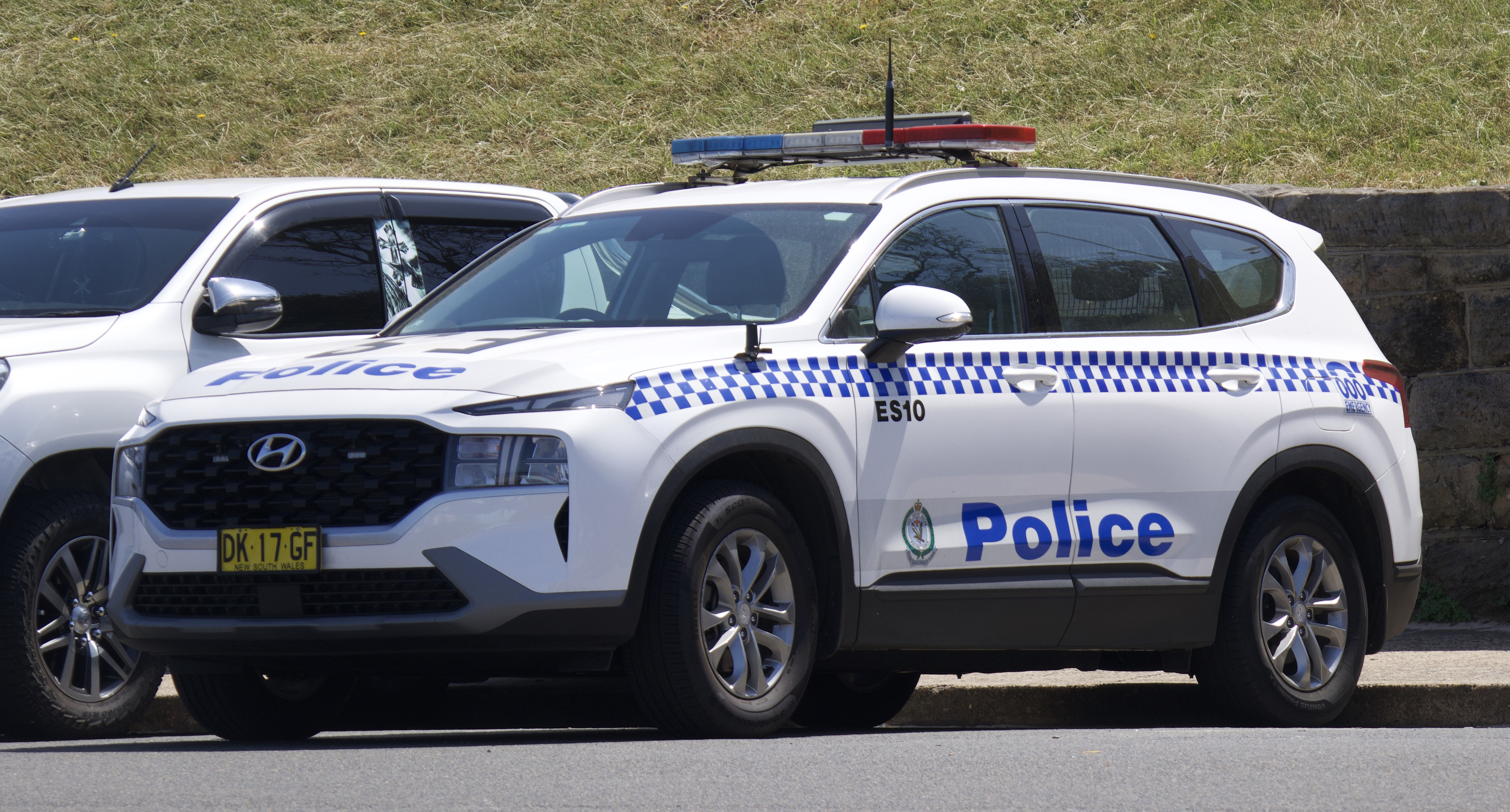
Hyundai Santa Fe (General Duties)

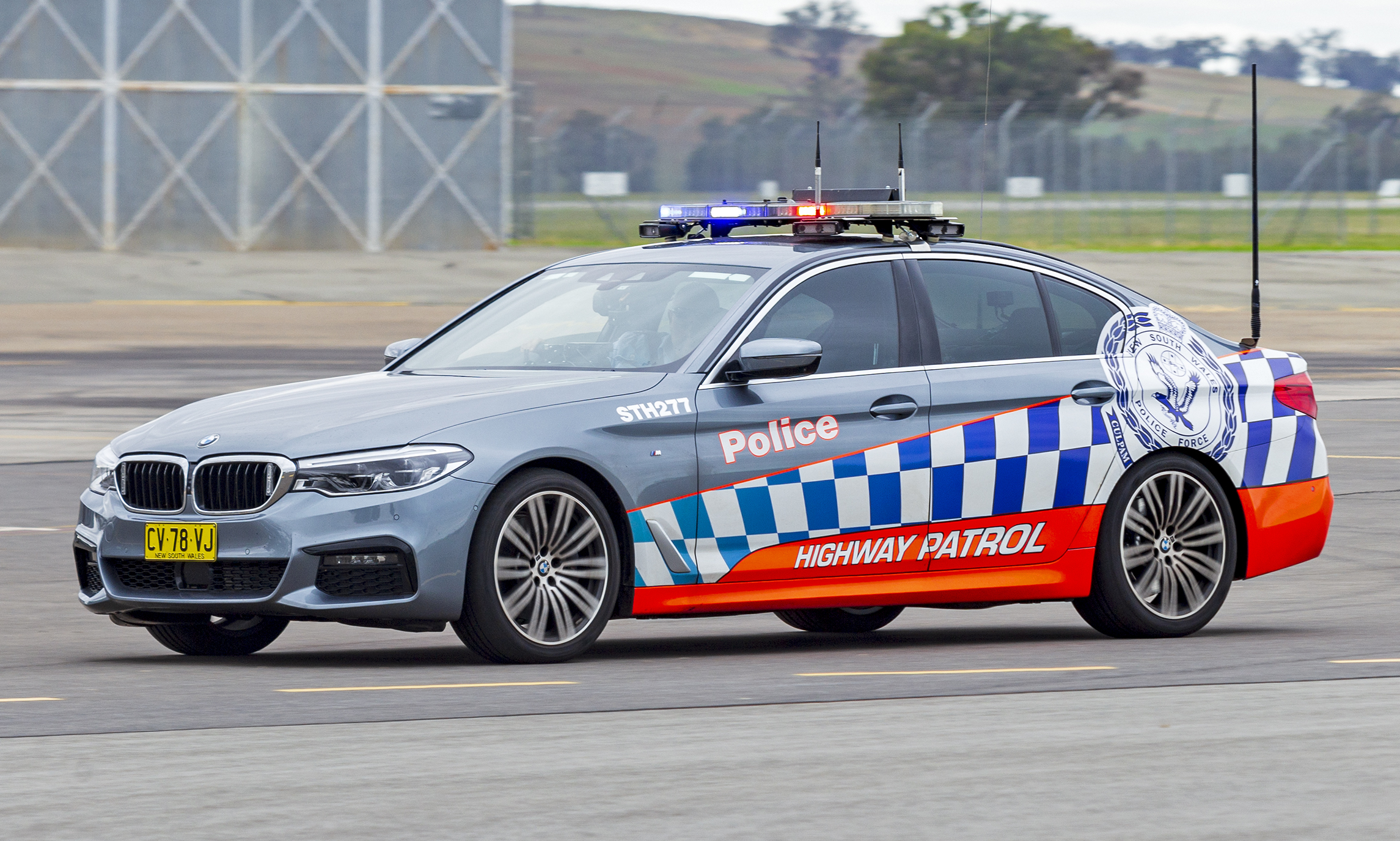
BMW 530D (Highway Patrol)

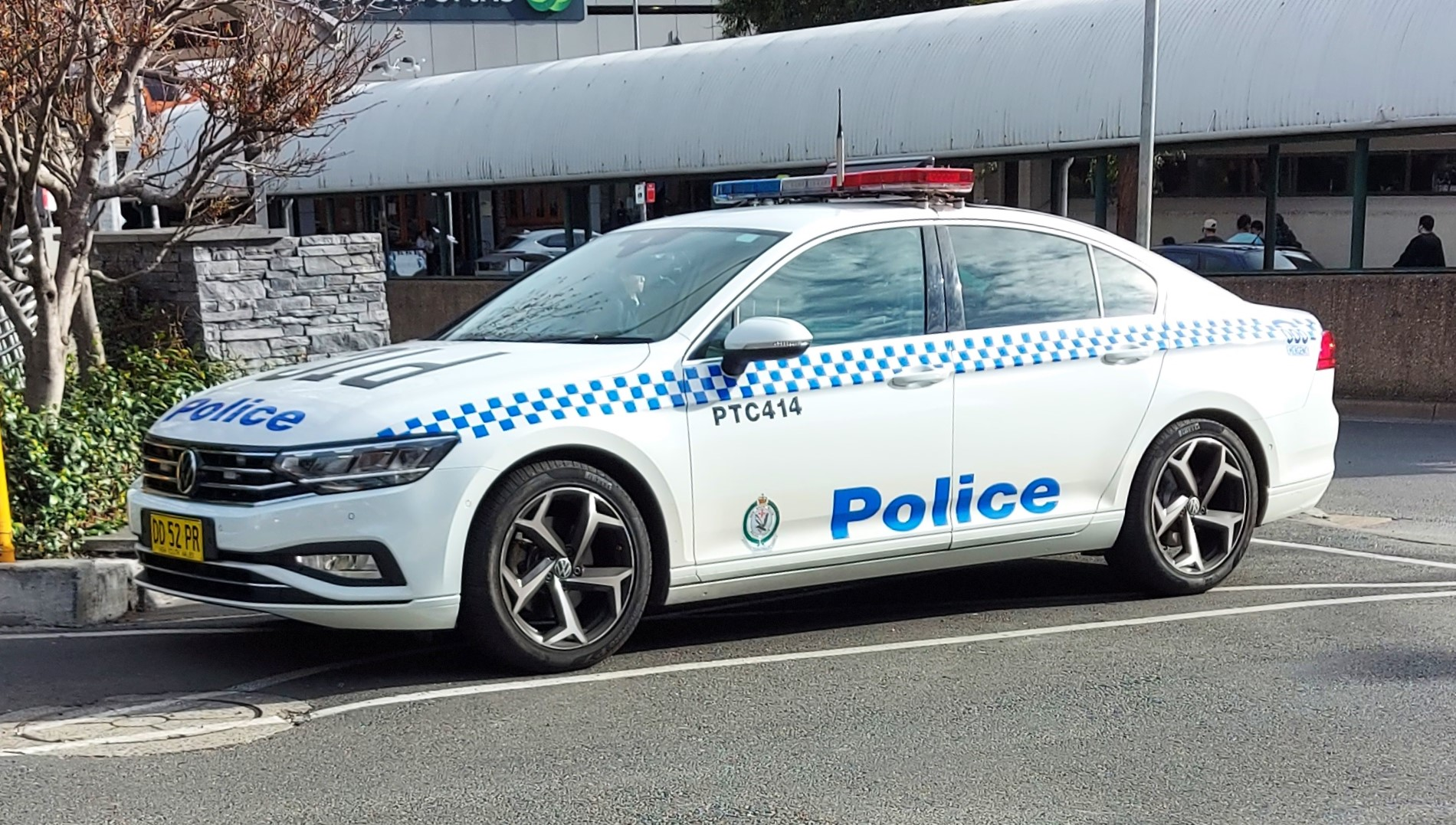
Volkswagen Passat (Police Transport Command)

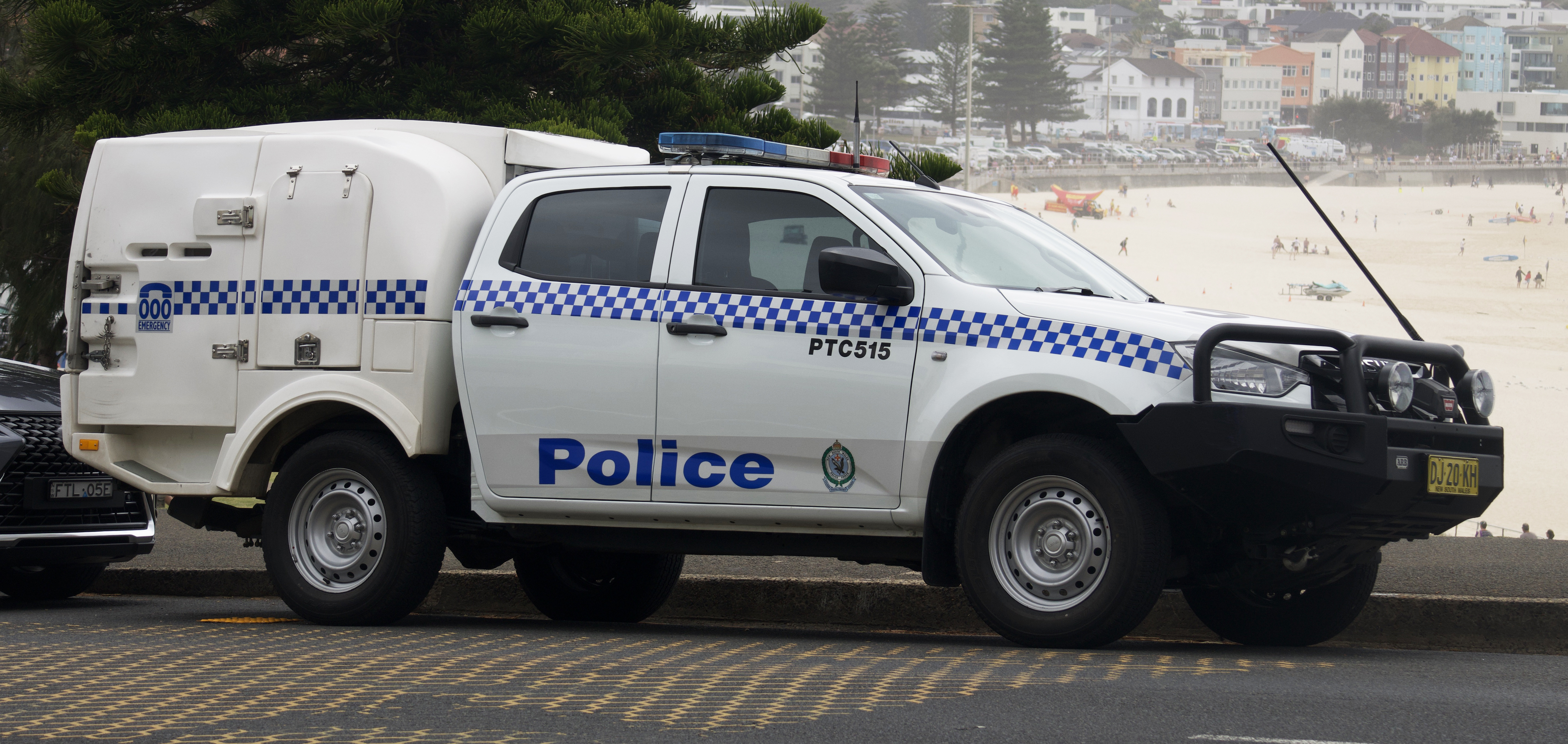
Isuzu D-Max (Caged Vehicle)

=== Aircraft ===
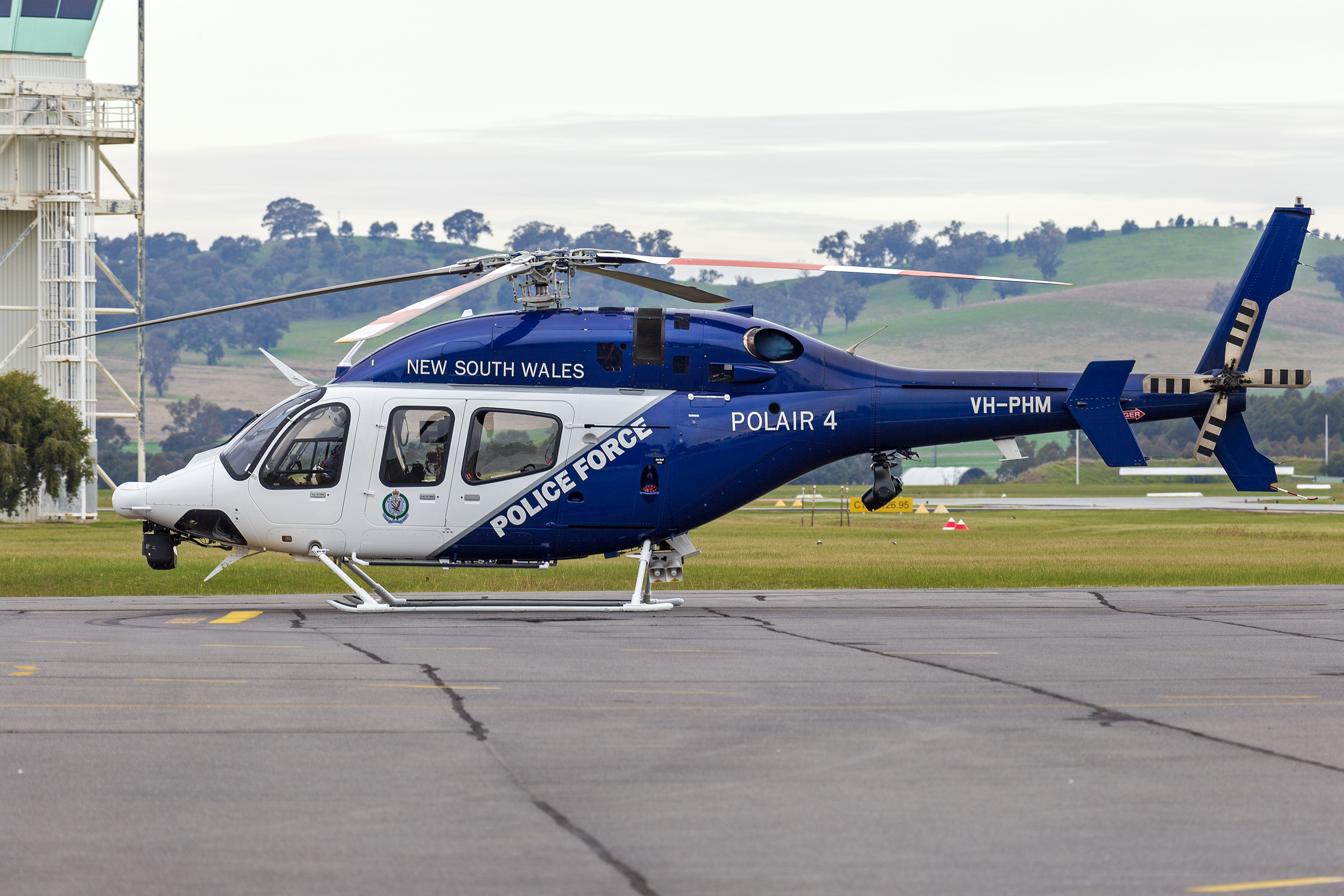
POLAIR 4 Bell 429

The NSW Police "Pol Air" fleet is currently composed of 8 aircraft – five helicopters and three fixed-wing aircraft:

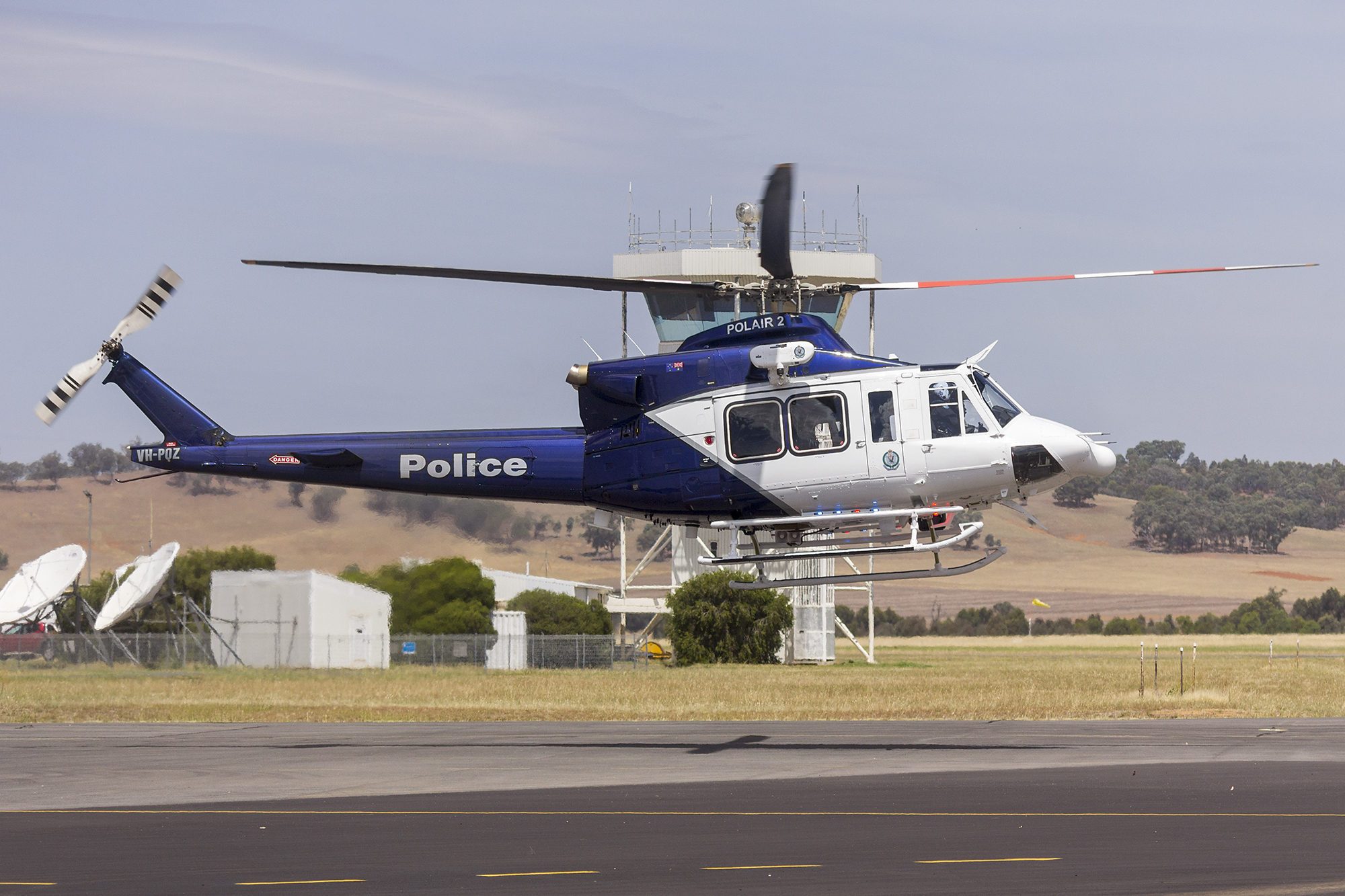
POLAIR 2 Bell 412 EPI

Helicopters: Polair 1–5

- 1 – 2020 Bell 429 (VH-PHW)
- 2 – 2017 Bell 412 EPI (VH-PQZ)
- 3 – 2020 Bell 429 (VH-PHB)
- 4 – 2020 Bell 429 (VH-PHM)
- 5 – 2014 Bell 412 EP (VH-PHZ)

Fixed-wing aircraft: Polair 6–8

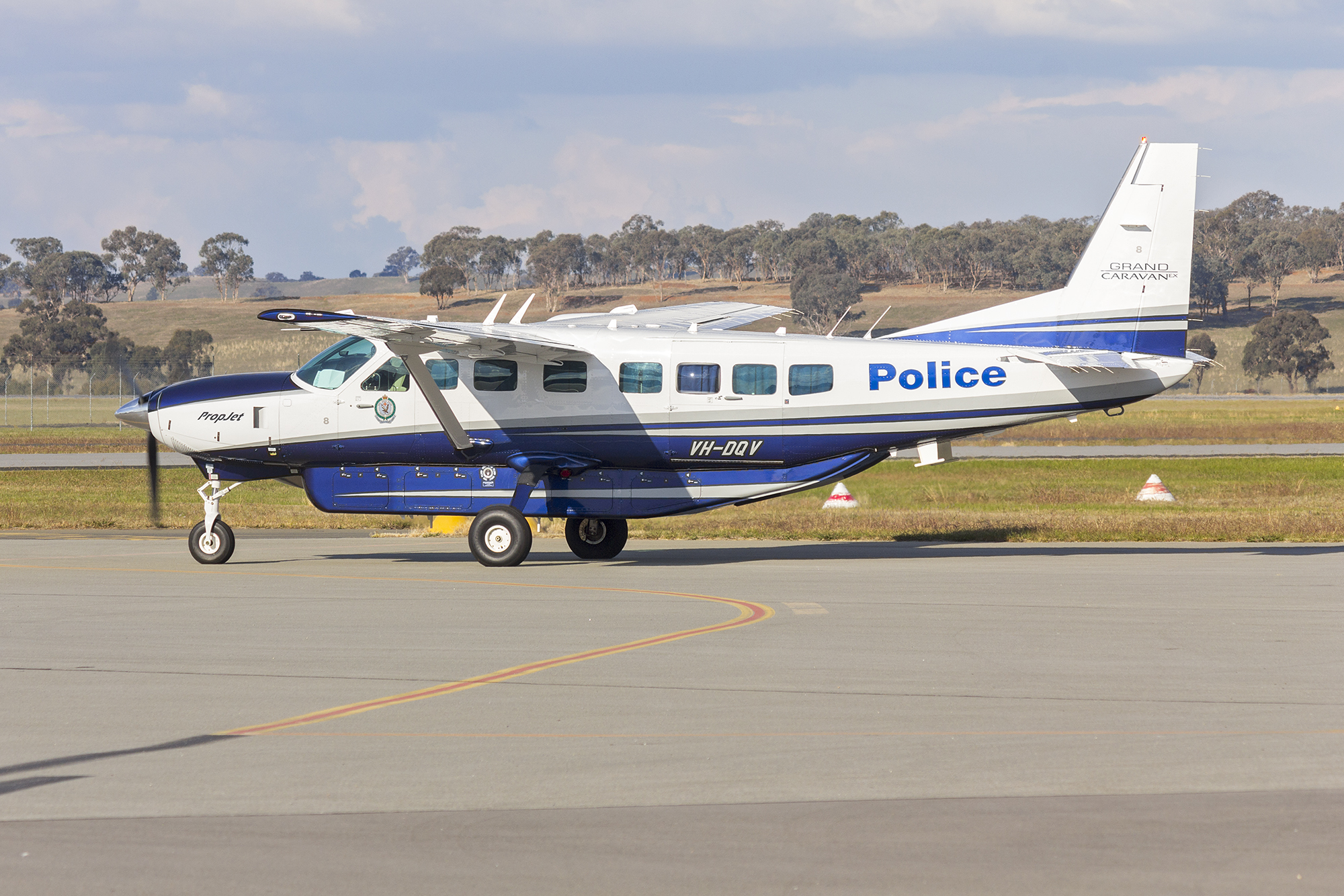
Cessna Grand Caravan EX 208B POLAIR 8

- 6 – single-engine turboprop Cessna 208B Caravan (VH-DVV)
- 7 – single-engine turboprop Cessna 208B Caravan (VH-DFV)
- 8 – single-engine turboprop Cessna 208B Caravan (VH-DQV)

The aircraft are equipped with modern technology and specialist equipment including rescue winches, Nite sun searchlights (30 million candle power), forward-looking infrared (FLIR), high definition video camera system, microwave down-linking of live pictures, digital radio communications and advanced integrated touch screen digital glass cockpits with global positioning satellite (GPS) navigation systems.

The fixed wing Cessna 206H aircraft, callsign Polair 6, is primarily used for aerial speed enforcement along major freeways and highways in the State. It is also used to transport officers and assist with search operations in remote areas of the State.

The much larger Cessna 208 Grand Caravan, callsign Polair 7, provides Police with a long-range, heavy lift capability allowing for the transport of cargo, specialist equipment and personnel during extensive search and rescue incidents, which is ideal for use in remote locations across the state. Various other fixed-wing aircraft such as a leased Cessna 500 have been used for major operations including the APEC Australia 2007 security operation. Another was also used during the Sydney Olympic Games in 2000.

=== Vessels ===
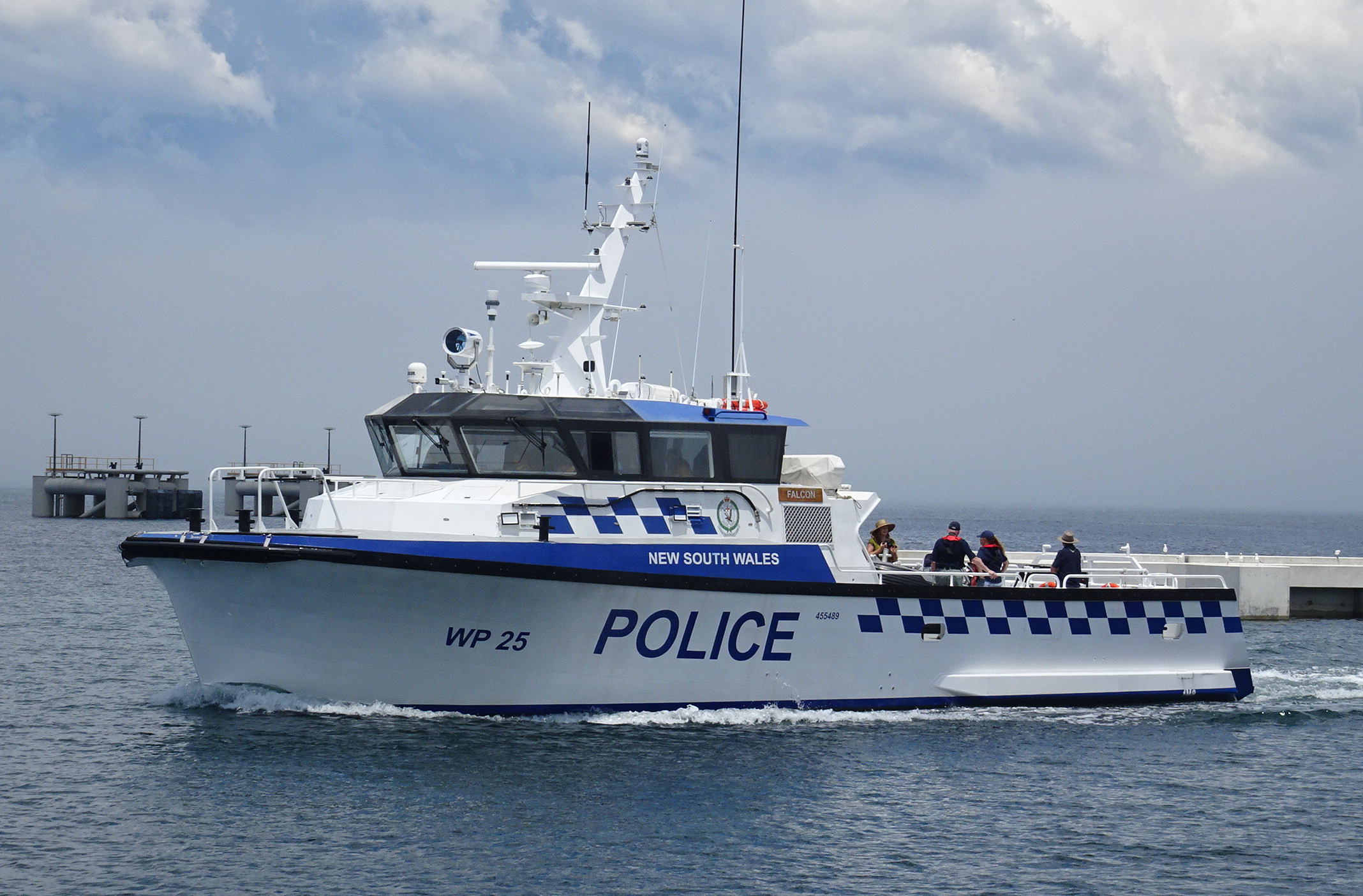
A Marine Area Command patrol boat (WP25 Falcon)

NSW Police Force, Marine Area Command has its main base at Balmain on Sydney Harbour and others at Broken Bay, Newcastle, Port Stephens, Coffs Harbour, Botany Bay, Port Kembla and Eden. It has 123 operational water police, marine intelligence unit, marine crime prevention officer, divers, detectives and the marine operational support team, and employs six civilian engineers and 30 deck hands.

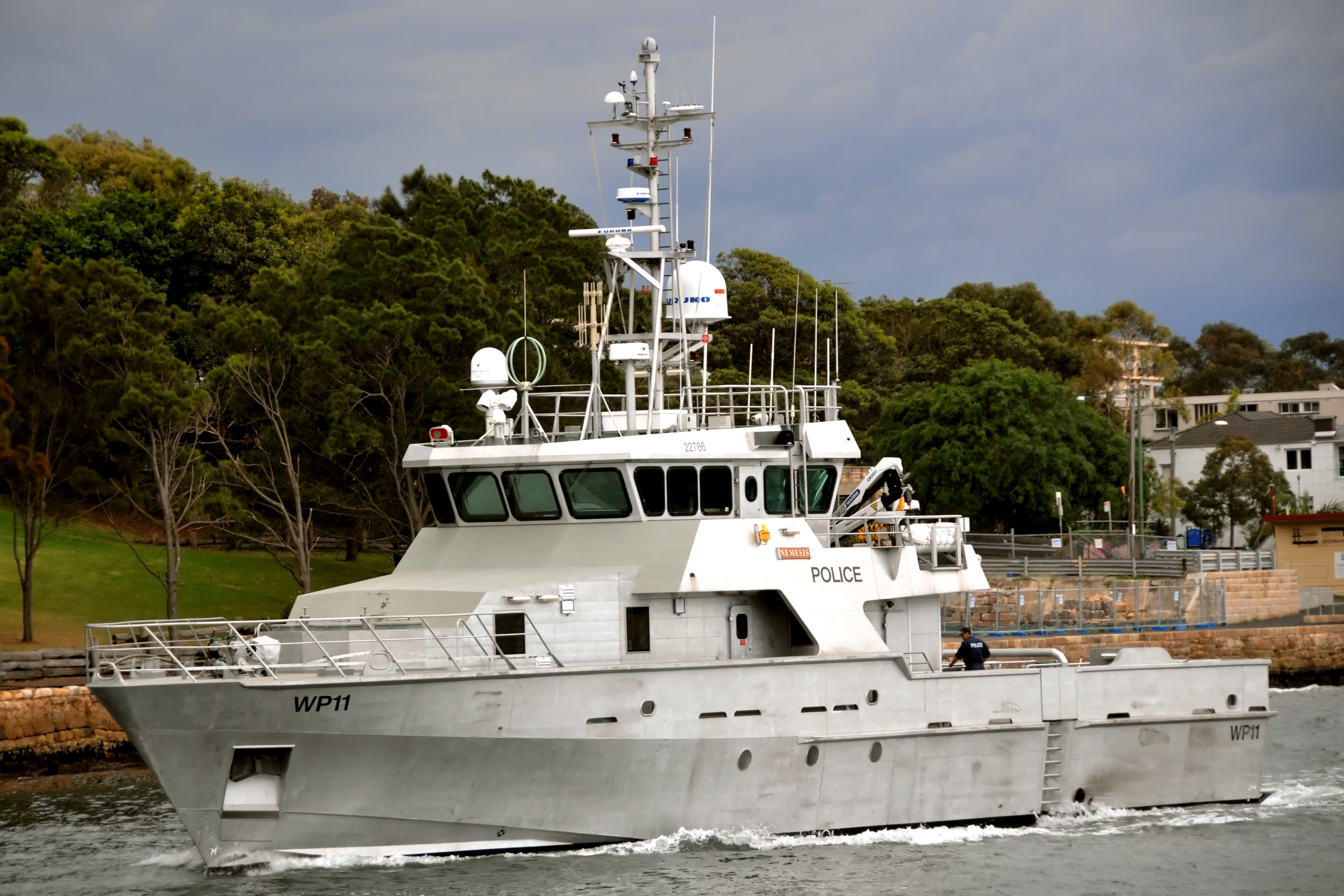
OPV Nemesis

The current fleet consists of 11 seagoing craft, including OPV Nemesis, the largest purpose-built Police boat in the Southern Hemisphere, and a number of smaller boats. In January 2013 seven new "class 4" Rigid-hulled inflatable boat watercraft were rolled out across the state to Balmain, Botany Bay and Broken Bay. The new 9.5-metre (31 ft) rigid-hulled inflatable boat have two 250 hp four-stroke outboard motors, with a speed of 45 knots (83 km/h; 52 mph) and a range of 200 nautical miles (370 km; 230 mi) at 25 knots (46 km/h; 29 mph), and are fitted with the latest navigation and communication equipment.

== Recruitment, training and ranks ==
=== NSW Police Academy, Goulburn ===
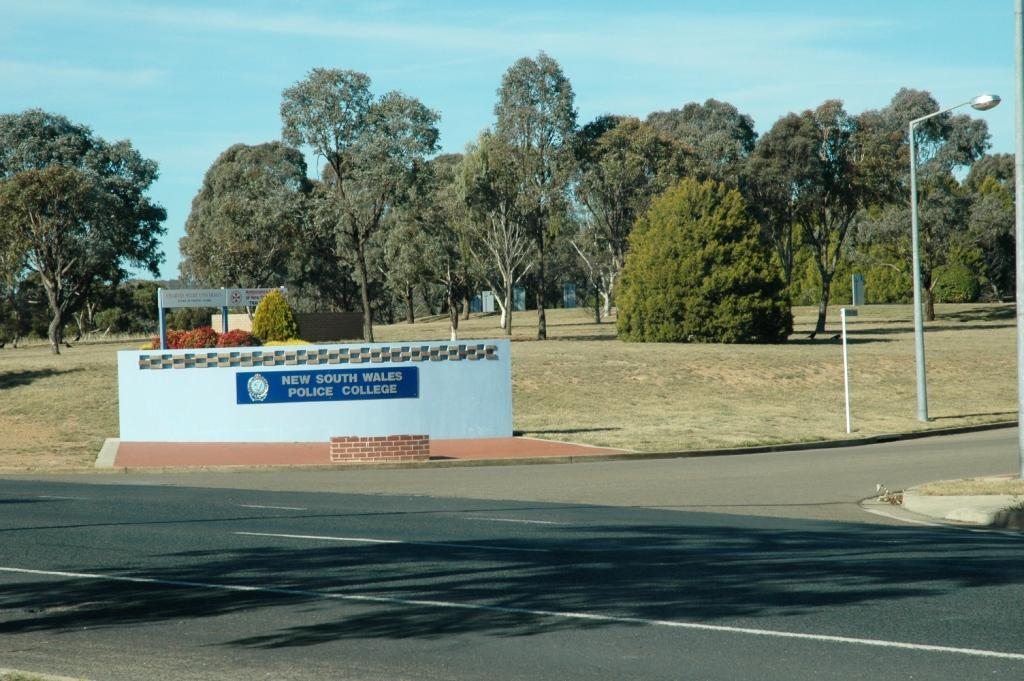
NSW Police academy at Goulburn

The NSW Police academy is situated on 40 hectares of land in Goulburn, in the Southern Tablelands of NSW, located 200 kilometres south of Sydney.

The Academy buildings are extensive, consisting of 80 training facilities such as lecture theatres, classrooms, virtual weapons training facility, live-fire indoor pistol range, a simulation training venue, scenario village, library, indoor and outdoor physical fitness areas, coin-operated laundry facilities and Charles Sturt University Wi-Fi access. The Police Driver Training Complex is located approximately 5 km from the main Academy and comprises about 80 hectares of land, including specialist training facilities. The Goulburn Academy also boasts recreation and common room facilities, the Police Shop, Police Bank with ATM, St Michael's Police Chapel and access to a range of amenities available in the township of Goulburn. There are about 1000 people on site each day, including police officers, policing students, Charles Sturt University staff and contractors. Accommodation facilities consist of 816 single residential rooms, 30 motel style units, 10 flats and houses. Catering and cleaning are provided by external contractors, with the dining room serving approximately 2,000 meals daily.

Located in the Memorial and Honour Precincts, the Academy has a number of memorials dedicated to the proud traditions of NSW Police, namely the Walls of Remembrance at the College Chapel (which features on the north side those who have died on duty, and those who have served in war and peacekeeping operations featured on the south side); the rose garden and eternal flame; the NSW Police horse & dog memorial; and Heroes' Walk (featuring 15 bravery banners including George Cross, Cross of Valour, Star of Courage and George Medal police recipients). The latest aspect to the "proud traditions project" was the installation of the NSW Police academy peacekeeping display. The display features a range of memorabilia and photographs from peacekeeping missions to which NSW Police have contributed. The display also features the Dag Hammerskjold Medal belonging to the late Sergeant Ian Ward, on loan from the AFP.

=== Application and training ===
NSW Police applicants must have enrolled in and completed the University Certificate in Workforce Essentials (UCWE), a four-week course run by Charles Sturt University, which introduces students to communication, resolving conflict with communication skills, legal framework, crime and policing, writing documents, ethical practices, cultural diversity, leadership and teamwork, workplace practices and obligations, technology, personal resilience, and safe driving.

After completing the UCWE, a First Aid Certificate and a Swim Rescue Test, an applicant can submit their Police Application. Upon receipt of the Police Application, applicants undergo a number of background checks including detailed background vetting, employment checks and a thorough investigation of an applicants history.

Applicants then undergo a physical assessment, a medical assessment and, potentially, a face to face interview with a 3 person panel. Applicants are then ranked and selected to attend the Goulburn Police Academy based on their scores.

The Goulburn Police Academy program begins with eight weeks of online lectures from home (Session 1 Block 1), before students attend the academy for six weeks of further training (Session 1 Block 2). Students then take part in a one week placement in a Police Area Command. Students then return to Goulburn for a further 16 weeks of training (Session 2).

An important part of students' training includes the use of weapons and police tactics. Students are trained in weaponless control, where they learn to apply defensive and restraining techniques in appropriate situations. Students are trained in the use of Police appointments, including handcuffs, batons, capsicum spray and tasers. Students are also trained in the use of the Glock 17 Service Pistol. Students must be able to demonstrate positive weapons handling, marksmanship and a detailed understanding of the justifiable use of a firearm in accordance with the NSW Police policy. Students are then faced with simulation training, where they're required to demonstrate effective communication skills and operational tactics in a simulated initial response situation, while also demonstrating a professional and ethical understanding of legal use of force.

Following the completion of Session 2, students receive an offer of employment from the NSW Police Force. They must then complete a further 42 weeks of online training (Sessions 3, 4 and 5) before finally graduating as a police officer.

In total, students receive 73 weeks of training, combining theory and practical skills ranging from shooting to driving. Following graduation, officers continue to maintain their skills through regular training and recertification, along with the ability to gain further specialist qualifications and skills in Specialist Police commands.

=== Rank structure ===
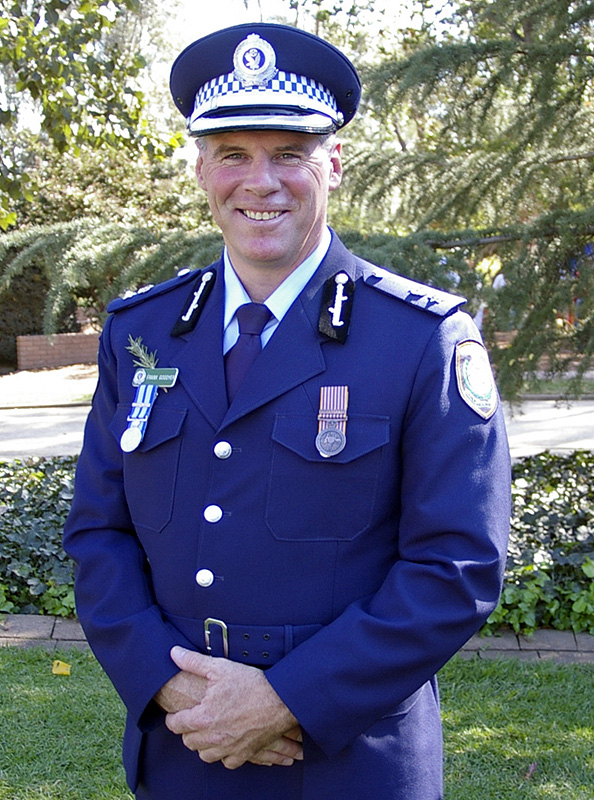
Former Wagga Wagga Local Area Commander, Superintendent Frank Goodyer

NSW Police is run on a community policing model. All sworn members start at the lowest rank of Probationary Constable / Constable. Promotion beyond Senior Constable is highly competitive. The following ranks are listed lowest to highest from left as set out in 2002.

Constable and non-commissioned ranks
Rank	Student	Probationary; Constable	Constable	Senior; Constable	Incremental; Senior; Constable	Sergeant	Incremental; Sergeant	Senior; Sergeant
Insignia								

Commissioned ranks
Rank	Inspector	Chief; Inspector	Superintendent	Chief; Superintendent	Assistant; Commissioner	Deputy; Commissioner	Commissioner
Insignia							

==== Constables ====
All grades of constable perform the same basic range of duties, with the rank only reflecting experience. The rank of Probationary Constable is held for the first 12 months of service. After 12 months of satisfactory service and completing the associate degree of Policing Practice via distance education, the Probationary Constable is confirmed as Constable.

Promotion to the rank of Senior Constable is not merit-based and can be obtained after five years of service and requires the officer to pass an examination that can cover a broad area of policing knowledge. Promotion to Incremental Senior Constable is also not merit-based and is obtained after 10 years of service. Senior Constables of all grades are called either "Senior Constable" or "senior".

Leading Senior Constable (LSC) was a merit-based rank that primarily saw an officer in a training role and belongs to a specific unit or duty type of which there is a limited number with progression to such being competitive and non-transferable. If an LSC transfers from a unit or duty type (such as from highway patrol to general duties or vice versa), they revert to their original Senior Constable rank. Previously, to be eligible for LSC, an officer must have had at least seven years' service, be Senior Constable and undergo many tests and selection processes in competition with other applicants.

As of 1st July 2025, the LSC rank has been discontinued, however provisons have now been made within the uniform policy to allow Senior Constables of 15 years service and above to wear the LSC rank epaulettes. This inclusion allows colleagues and members of the public to quickly recognise an officer's length of service.

==== Non-commissioned officers ====
Promotion to the rank of Sergeant and beyond is achieved by way of a merit-based promotion system whereby officers undertake a series of "pre-qualification assessments" and are placed on a ranked list before gaining promotion. Officers who qualify for a promotion list are given an eligibility mark and are ranked according to order of merit from the highest mark to the lowest. This means that the highest-ranked member on the promotions list will be considered first for the rank and position concerned. Members seeking placement on a promotion list must have spent the requisite time at the rank below, which is at least two years, and must have successfully completed the relevant pre-qualifying assessment examinations, an applicant evaluation and must meet the eligibility program. A new promotion list for each rank or grade is prepared each year, and an applicant who does not accept promotion can remain on a list only for three years before having to requalify for the list. On promotion to Sergeant and Senior Sergeant members are issued a warrant of appointment under the Commissioner's hand and seal.

A Sergeant normally supervises a team of Constables during a shift. A Detective Sergeant is normally in charge of a team of detectives in a specific part of a local command or a specialist squad in the State Crime Command.

Incremental Sergeant, referred to simply as "sergeant", is not a rank or merit-based but a pay scale increment based on service. An incremental sergeant wears a small crown above the chevrons indicating that they have reached the highest pay scale step in the rank of Sergeant.

Senior sergeants are generally attached to "regions" as region training coordinators, region traffic coordinators, region operations coordinator positions or in legal services, professional standards, protocol, education services and perform middle-management duties.

==== Commissioned officers ====
On completing at least three years but usually more as a sergeant and the relevant assessments, including an exam and interview, an officer may be appointed to the rank of "Inspector" and issued a certificate of commission under the Commissioner's hand and seal. Commissioned officers may be acknowledged by the rank they hold or, more commonly, as "sir", "ma'am" or "boss".

An Inspector oversees and manages sergeants and teams of constables and performs administrative work, coordination of policing operations or specialist work. At Police Area Commands, an Inspector is allocated to each shift as a "Duty Officer" who oversees the general running of the Police Station (more often than not their tasks and roles are delegated to the supervising Sergeants on shift).

Superintendents are usually "commanders" of Police Area Commands or specialist units.

Assistant Commissioners are generally "commanders" of regions or corporate portfolios.

As of 2010, the rank of Senior Assistant Commissioner had been dispensed with. Officers currently holding that rank will retain it until retiring or upon promotion to a higher rank.

==== Honorary Commissions ====
In July 2014, the then Commissioner of the NSW Police, Andrew Scipione, bestowed the honorary rank and title of "Governor" of the NSW Police upon the then Governor of New South Wales, Marie Bashir, for her service to the NSW Police. Subsequent governors have been appointed to this honorary rank. The Governor of the NSW Police can wear the uniform of commissioned officer of the NSW Police with the rank insignia being the State Badge surmounted by a crown.

==== Detectives ====
The path to becoming a NSW Police designated Detective is lengthy and requires extensive additional training. After a minimum of 3 years in uniform if an officer wishes to become a detective and undertake criminal investigation (CI) duties then they must first apply to undertake a rotation of at least 3 months in a detective's office. During this rotation the officer will work with senior detectives who will evaluate their performance and suitability for CI duties. At the conclusion of this secondment an officer is given a formal assessment where they are evaluated in all aspects of their investigative performance. If they meet the required benchmark score then the officer will become eligible to sit an oral examination by a panel of high ranking Detective Inspectors and Detective Sergeants. This gruelling exam is formally called the Potential Detectives Recruitment Exam (PDRE) but is universally known as the 'bull ring'. If an officer passes their 'bull ring' then they are entered into a pool of officers who are eligible to compete against each other for any CI positions when they are periodically advertised across the police force. If an officer applies for, and wins, a permanent CI position then after a period of 6 months of experience they are permitted to undertake the Detectives Education Programme (DEP) and then the Detectives Designation Course (DDC). These courses involve extensive additional training, examinations and assessments in advanced criminal investigation, complex evidence law and criminal trial processes. These courses take a combined 12 to 18 months to complete. After the successful completion of the DEP and DDC the officer is awarded the designation of "Detective". As it is a designation and not a rank, the designation comes prior to the rank (e.g., Detective Constable, Detective Senior Constable, etc.). Detectives receive one of the highest specialist pay allowances within the NSWPF in recognition of their increased responsibilities, training and experience. The higher rate of pay adds to the generally (but not always) good natured friction between detectives and general duties (uniform) officers.

Detectives can transfer back to general duties (uniform) or to another section within the NSWPF, this is common when seeking promotion or for career progression. However, when a detective transfers outside of an authorised full-time investigation position, detectives are not permitted to use their designation and must refer to themselves by their rank without adding 'Detective' at the front of it. When a detective transfers out of CI they also lose their specialist pay allowances. Upon returning to an authorised CI position, they can again use their designation of 'Detective' without having to requalify.

From December 2020, designated detectives now receive a unique police badge different to all other NSW Police. The badge has the same NSW Police crest but unlike the standard NSW Police badge it has no coloured rank backing plate and has the words “New South Wales Police Force” above and “Detective” below. Again, when a detective transfers out of CI they must return their detective's badge.

==== Police Prosecutors ====
Under the Accelerated Prosecutor Recruitment Program (APRP), the NSW Police Force recruits both experienced police officers and law graduates into prosecutorial roles. Through the APRP, law graduates can be fast-tracked into becoming police prosecutors after completing their probationary period as constables. Historically, candidates were required to complete several years of general policing duties before entering prosecution roles, however, this pathway has been streamlined under the APRP. Training cohorts typically consist of both operational police officers and APRP participants, allowing for a combination of practical policing experience and formal legal education within the program.

== Honours and awards ==
Recognition for the bravery and sacrifice of NSW Police is expressed through honours and awards. The NSW Police was the first Australian Police organisation to have one of its members awarded the Imperial honour George Cross and the Australian Cross of Valour. Sergeant 3rd Class Eric George Bailey GC was awarded the George Cross posthumously on 12 January 1945. The NSW Police also has the distinction in having one of its members being awarded the highest civilian bravery award, namely the Cross of Valour. Only five people have received the Cross of Valour with a NSW Police officer being the first Australian Police Officer to do so. On 3 May 1996, then Detective Senior Constable Allan Sparkes rescued a boy trapped in a flooded underground storm water drain following record rainfalls at Coffs Harbour.

=== Australian honours and awards ===
NSW Police are eligible for the following national honours and awards:

- Australian bravery decorations, namely the Cross of Valour (CV), Star of Courage (SC), Bravery Medal (BM) and the Commendation for Brave Conduct
- Australian Police Medal (APM)
- Police Overseas Service Medal
- National Police Service Medal
- National Medal
- Campaign Medals such as United Nations Medal For Service

=== Internal NSW Police honours and awards ===
NSW Police has a number of its own Honours and Awards awarded by the Commissioner which are highly prized, in part, because they are only awarded to in small numbers with the vast amount going to non uniformed officers. In 2002, then commissioner, Ken Moroney AO APM implemented the Commissioner's Community Service Commendation and Community Service Citation.

==== NSW Police commendations and medals ====
- Valour Award (VA)
- Commissioner's Commendation (Courage)
- Commissioner's Commendation (Service)
- Commissioner's Olympic Commendation
- Commissioner's Community Service Commendation
- Medal for Diligent and Ethical Service (awarded after 10 years' service, with clasps awarded for every five years thereafter)

The above in-service decorations are worn 5 mm below the officer's name plate and are right-sided decorations.

==== NSW Police citations ====
The following in-service decorations are worn 5 mm above the officer's name plate and are right-sided decorations.

- Unit Citation (maximum three further awards are indicated by silver stars) – metal device, with silver laurel leaf surround, with light blue enamel centre. This award is rarely awarded to uniformed officers.
- Commissioner's Community Service Citation (maximum one further award indicated by one silver star) – metal device, with silver laurel leaf surround, with white enamel centre.
- Commissioner's Olympic Citation – metal device, with silver laurel leaf surround, with navy blue enamel centre and silver Olympic rings.
- Commissioner's Sesquicentenary Citation – metal device, with thin silver surround, with navy blue and light blue striped enamel centre and silver numerals of '1862' '150' '2012' with a depiction of the State of NSW and Silitoe tartan.
- Commissioner's Emergency Citation – A drop ribbon similar to other Commissioner awards. Awarded to all NSW Police employees for service during 2021.

In 2000, then commissioner, Peter Ryan QPM implemented the Olympic Commendation and the Olympic Citation which was given out in large numbers for the contributions by members of the force to the Sydney 2000 Olympics, claimed as the "Safest Games in modern Olympics history". NSW Police is the only police organisation in the world to be permitted the Olympic Rings to be attached.

== Peacekeeping ==
In peacekeeping operations, officers are seconded to the Australian Federal Police and take an oath or affirmation of the AFP. They are then appointed to the rank of Senior Sergeant, Station Sergeant, Superintendent or Commander. Following their service, UN peacekeeping veterans are awarded the United Nations Medal for their particular mission. In addition, under the Australian system of honours and awards, Police officers serving with peacekeeping organisations are awarded the Police Overseas Service Medal with the relevant clasp for the prescribed area of service. As of 2008, two clasps to that medal were awarded to members for operations in Cyprus and East Timor.

=== Cyprus (UNFICYP) ===
Members were among the first Australian Police sent to Cyprus in May 1964 as the first UN Police contingent. The UN Civilian Police (now known as UNPOL or United Nations Police) was established with a three-months' mandate to end hostilities between the Greek and Turkish communities and promote peace on the island. The operation is ongoing.

Members were subsequently withdrawn from Cyprus in 1976, along with all other State and Territory Police following the Turkish invasion of Cyprus on 20 July 1974. During the invasion and preceding it the Australian Police were subject to machine gun and mortar fire and Turkish air attack. Some of their personal motor vehicles, motorcycles and personal items at that time were destroyed, lost or stolen. Fortunately, there was no loss of Australian lives at that time. Australian Police continued to negotiate between the invading Turkish army, other warring parties and escorted refugees to safety from both sides. Since UNFICYP commenced, a large number of the NSW Police has served in Cyprus alongside other Australian police jurisdictions.

=== East Timor (UNTAET and UNMISET) ===
From 2000 to 2005, 45 NSW Police were involved in the United Nations Transitional Administration in East Timor (UNTAET) and the United Nations Mission of Support in East Timor (UNMISET) seconded to the Australian Federal Police for their Tour of Duty in East Timor with the United Nations. There have only been three female NSWP officers to serve.

In addition, two NSW Police have been commended for courage for peacekeeping in East Timor, one by the Australian government, and the Australian Federal Police Commissioners Commendation for Bravery (station sergeant David McCann OAM – UNMISET and one by the commissioner (senior sergeant Mark Aubrey Gilpin – UNTAET). McCann was awarded the Commendation for Brave Conduct for his part in the rescue of 110 vulnerable persons from a village in East Timor after it suffered major flooding. Gilpin was awarded the NSW Police Commendation (courage) for his part in protecting a member of the community who was being subjected to mob justice. He placed his body in front of the mob, which were armed with machetes and other weapons, and managed to extract the victim to safety.

Out of the 10 Australian peacekeepers who have died on peacekeeping missions, two were NSW Police serving with UNFICYP. Sergeant Ian Ward and Inspector Patrick Hackett died in separate incidents in UNFCYP. A total of 124 soldiers and police gave their lives while serving with the UN in Cyprus.

== Controversies ==
In June 2021 Friendlyjordies producer Kristo Langker was arrested by officers from the Fixated Persons Unit and charged with two counts of stalking and intimidating John Barilaro after Langker had approached Barilaro at different events. Langker's lawyer Mark Davis contested the police's accounts, and he denounced the timing of the arrest being soon after the defamation lawsuit commenced. He also criticised use of the Fixated Persons Unit, a counter-terrorism unit set up in the wake of the Lindt Cafe siege. In August 2021 it was revealed that Barilaro had been in contact with the Fixated Persons Unit regarding Shanks for at least six months prior to Langker's arrest. This contradicted what Barilaro had earlier told Sky News Australia host Tom Connell, saying that he had not requested the Fixated Persons Unit become involved in the matter.

In November 2022, NSW police were speaking with well known activist Danny Lim. During the incident the attending Police attempted to arrest Lim and through use of excessive force caused serious injuries requiring hospitalisation. As of December 2022 this matter is still being investigated with regards to the lawfulness of the arrest and the subsequent injuries with the officers involved suspended pending the outcome of the investigation.

=== Drug detection dogs and strip searches ===
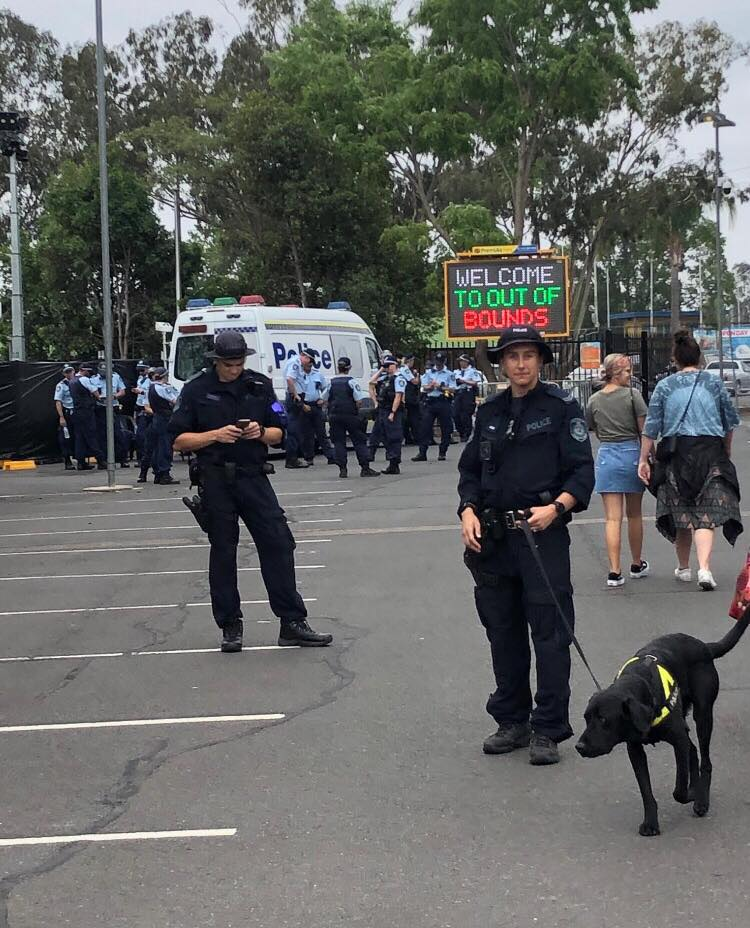
Police and a drug detection dog at the Out of Bounds music festival in Campbelltown in 2020

Following the introduction of a controversial law in 2001, NSW Police were given the power to deploy drug detection dogs at major public events such as music festivals, inside licensed premises (venues that serve alcohol) and at stations across the Sydney Trains network.

A report published by the New South Wales Ombudsman in 2006 found that 74% of searches resulting from drug detection dog indications carried out over a two-year review period had failed to locate any illicit drugs. The report concluded that “Overwhelmingly, the use of drug detection dogs has led to public searches of individuals in which no drugs were found, or to the detection of (mostly young) adults in possession of very small amounts of cannabis for personal use”. Subsequent figures obtained from NSW Police in 2023 revealed that between 1 January 2013 and 30 June 2023, officers had conducted 94,535 personal searches (refers to both strip searches and less invasive frisk or "general" searches) resulting from drug detection dog indications, with only 25% resulting in illicit drugs being found.

In late 2014, reports were first published alleging that NSW Police were routinely using drug detection dog indications as a justification for conducting invasive strip searches, particularly at major events such as music festivals. At these events, officers have employed the use of structures such as ticket booths, tents, makeshift partitions and police vans to conduct these searches. In some cases, it’s been alleged that these structures did not offer adequate privacy to individuals being searched, leaving them exposed to other attendees or officers outside. After stripping partially or completely naked, individuals have reportedly been asked to do things such as lift their breasts or genitals, bend over, spread their buttocks apart or squat and cough. Similar searches have reportedly been conducted during drug detection dog operations at train stations and licensed venues as well.

Data obtained from NSW Police shows that between 1 July 2014 and 30 June 2020, officers had conducted 27,835 strip searches "in the field" (outside of a police station). Separate data shows that during the same six-year period, officers had conducted 5659 strip searches resulting from drug detection dog indications.

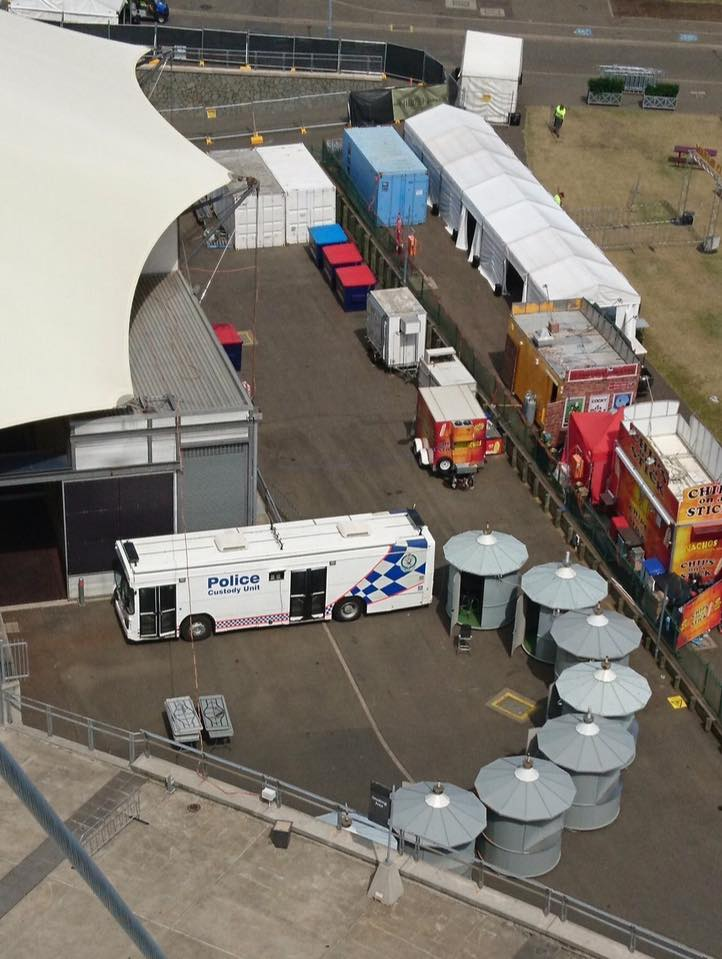
Ticket booths used to search patrons at the Hidden music festival at Sydney Olympic Park in 2019. An LECC investigation revealed that for "officer safety", booths at the event were left unlocked while strip searches were taking place.

In October 2018, the Law Enforcement Conduct Commission launched a formal investigation into the use of strip searches by NSW Police. In a final report handed down in December 2020, the Commission found that "a recurrent issue throughout the inquiry was the failure of officers to comply with, or at least to properly account for their compliance with, the legal thresholds for conducting a strip search". In several cases investigated by the Commission, it was found that officers had acted unlawfully. The commission also noted that there had been a "significant increase" in the "number and proportion" of strip searches carried out following drug detection dog indications in the five years between 2014 and 2019.

In July 2022, a class action was filed in the Supreme Court of New South Wales on behalf of patrons strip searched at music festivals by NSW Police from July 2016 onwards. The class action was launched by law firm Slater and Gordon in partnership Redfern Legal Centre. Head plaintiff for the class action is a then 27-year-old woman who was allegedly strip searched at the Splendour in the Grass music festival in 2018. It’s alleged that the woman was stopped by a drug detection dog before being taken to an area where several “makeshift cubicles” had been setup by police. After patting her down, it’s alleged that a female officer asked her to expose her breasts before instructing her to take off her pants and underwear and remove a tampon from her body. It’s also alleged that a male officer walked into the cubicle where the woman was being searched while she was bent over and naked from the waist down.

In December 2023, the NSW Government was unsuccessful in a bid to have the class action "declassed", with Supreme Court Justice Peter Garling ruling that the matter should continue as a class action instead of being split into individual cases. A trial for the class action is expected to be held in mid-2025.

=== Tasering of Clare Nowland ===
In 2023, a NSW Police officer tasered a 95-year-old woman, Clare Nowland, twice at an aged care home in Cooma. Police claim Nowland had a knife. Nowland had dementia and used a mobility walker. The electric shocks caused Nowland to fall and fracture her skull. Nowland died in hospital one week later. The event caused significant public outcry and a critical incident investigation was launched into the conduct of the NSW Police involved and the use of force by NSW Police. The officer who tasered Nowland was charged with grievous bodily harm, assault occasioning actual bodily harm and common assault. The NSW government has refused to release the results of the investigation. It was subsequently claimed that NSW Police covered up the use of a taser in early media statements concerning the incident despite a draft statement including mention of a taser.

== See also ==
- Crime in Sydney
- Crime in Australia
- Independent Commission Against Corruption
- Justice and Police Museum
- Law Enforcement Conduct Commission
- New South Wales Mounted Police
- Operations Support Group
- Police Integrity Commission
- Public Order and Riot Squad
- State Protection Group

Former units:

- Tactical Response Group (TRG) – Former NSW Police unit.
- Special Weapons and Operations Squad (SWOS) – Former NSW Police unit.

Individuals:

- List of commissioners of the New South Wales Police
- Phillip Arantz

Other:

- Public Service Association of NSW, the Union for Administrative and Support Staff employed in NSW Police
