= Bail Act 2013 =

Australian statute

- Coat of Arms of New South Wales

Parliament of New South Wales
- Long title: An Act to make provision for bail in connection with criminal and other proceedings.
- Citation: No. 26 of 2013 (NSW)
- Enacted by: New South Wales Legislative Assembly
- Enacted by: New South Wales Legislative Council
- Assented to by: Governor Marie Bashir
- Assented to: 27 May 2013
- Commenced: 20 May 2014
- Administered by: Department of Attorney General and Justice

Legislative history

Initiating chamber: New South Wales Legislative Assembly
- Bill title: Bail Bill 2013
- Introduced by: Greg Smith, Attorney General
- First reading: 1 May 2013
- Second reading: 1 May 2013, 8 May 2013, 9 May 2013 .
- Third reading: 9 May 2013

Revising chamber: New South Wales Legislative Council
- Member(s) in charge: Michael Gallacher, Minister for Police and Emergency Services, Minister for the Hunter, and Vice-President of the Executive Council
- First reading: 21 May 2013
- Second reading: 21 May 2013, 22 May 2013
- Third reading: 22 May 2013

Repeals
- Bail Act 1978

Amended by
- Bail Amendment Act 2014 (NSW), Bail Amendment Act 2015 (NSW), Bail Amendment Act 2022 (NSW), Bail and Crimes Amendment Act 2024 (NSW), Bail and Other Legislation Amendment (Domestic Violence) Act 2024 (NSW)

Related legislation
- Crimes Act 1900
- Status: Amended

The Bail Act 2013 is a New South Wales law that came into effect on 20 May 2014. It replaces the Bail Act 1978, which was considered "groundbreaking" when enacted, but has been reformed several times to presume against bail. The new act was created with the aims that it would be easier to understand, would further protect the community and would promote consistent decision-making. The Bail Act 2013 uses an "unacceptable risk" test in regard to whether "the accused will fail to appear in any proceedings for the offence, commit a serious offence, endanger the safety of victims, individuals or the community, or interfere with witnesses or evidence".

The Bail Act 2013 passed in the NSW parliament in May 2013. In response to a review, Bail Act reforms passed parliament in September 2014, and came into effect on 28 January 2015.

== Review of previous law ==
On 9 June 2011, Premier Barry O'Farrell announced that the NSW Law Reform Commission would review the bail law. In April 2012, the Commission reported that the previous law had become complex, making it difficult even for legal practitioners to understand and apply. The Bail Act 1978 was considered "groundbreaking" when enacted but has been reformed several times to presume against bail. In its review of the bail law in New South Wales, the Law Reform Commission noted that over the 15 years prior, the population in remand had tripled due to "policy shifts". It recommended a new, simplified, bail law, to be written in "plain English". The "justification" decision-making process to detain or release was recommended over the "unacceptable risk" model used in the Bail Act 1977 (Vic.). The Commission stated that "it is more difficult to include explicit reference to the interests of the person within the unacceptable risk model" and that neither the Victorian bail act nor the Bail Act 1980 (Qld), which use risk-based models, make reference to the interests of the person. The commission also stated that the "justification" model was familiar. In November 2012, the Government decided to create a new Bail Act that was easier to understand, with aims to further protect the community and promote consistent decision-making.

== Changes proposed and features of the legislation ==
Premier Barry O'Farrell announced the "new, simpler Bail Act" in a press release in November 2012. The Government did not adopt all of the recommendations made by Law Reform Commission. Different interpretations of the bail laws caused a rift between the Attorney General and Minister for Justice, Greg Smith, and the Police Minister, Michael Gallacher. Greens MLC David Shoebridge explained this as Smith wanting a "more rational" set of laws that removed complexity and unfairness, and Gallacher "fighting the reforms". Max Taylor, a former magistrate, characterised the change in the proposal to a risk-based approach as "the police shouted and the government trembled".

The Government stated that, unlike the Bail Act 1978, the new act is not based on a "system of offence-based presumptions". Instead, it is based on the premise of whether the accused will present as an "unacceptable risk" to society. The new act also allows for a further application if: the accused previously did not have legal representation, there is new relevant information, relevant circumstances have changed, or the accused is under 18 and the previous application was made on a first appearance for the offence. In May 2013, on the second reading of the Bail Bill, Attorney General and Minister for Justice Greg Smith described the Government's approach as one of "risk-management". The Bail Act 2013 adds an "unacceptable risk" test in regard to whether "the accused will fail to appear in any proceedings for the offence, commit a serious offence, endanger the safety of victims, individuals or the community, or interfere with witnesses or evidence".

One significant change is in consideration of "the presumption of innocence and the general right to be at liberty." Another important change is that "once bail is granted, it will continue to operate until it is either revoked or the substantive proceedings concluded." Under the Bail Act 2013, bail does not have to be formally continued by the court. When the bail authority determines that the accused poses an "unacceptable risk", it must record the nature of the presumed risk and consider risk mitigation approaches.

To determine whether there is an "unacceptable risk", the bail authority can consider the person's background; the seriousness of the offence; the strength of the case; whether the person has a history of violence or non-compliance with bail requirements, apprehended violence orders, parole or good behaviour bonds; the likely length of the sentence if bail is not granted; and whether the person is of a disadvantaged group. It was noted by a member of the NSW Bar Association that, while they were not "unusual or unfamiliar", not all of the factors the bail authority may consider are directly related to the "unacceptable risk" test.

Shoebridge noted that determination of who bore the burden of proof as to whether an accused person constitutes an unacceptable risk was not well covered in the law. Christopher White, the Policy Manager, Justice Policy, Department of Attorney General and Justice, stated in his introduction to the Bail Act 2013 that if the prosecution asserted that an unacceptable risk was present, the onus was on the prosecution to prove it. However, in the decision of R v Lago [2014] NSWSC 660, Hamill J held at [5] that the Bail Act 2013 does not place an onus on either party to prove whether there is or is not an unacceptable risk.

Three kinds of bail applications were defined: a release application, a detention application and a variation application.

The president of the NSW Bar Association was disappointed that there was not "a universal presumption in favour of bail". David Shoebridge was disappointed that adults would be limited to one bail application.

The Bail Act 2013 passed in the NSW parliament in May 2013, and the law commenced on 20 May 2014.

Don Weatherburn of the NSW Bureau of Crime Statistics and Research has raised concerns that police are using future Court Attendance Notices instead of refusing bail as much as they were before. Weatherburn noted that during the period when the new law was first introduced, there were "fewer bail cases coming before the courts". At around the same time as the new Bail Act commenced, the NSW Police Force put into practice a new custody system. According to some police officers this has made the bail assessment paperwork take three times as long as the previous system.

== Hatzistergos Review and Bail Amendment Act 2014 ==
After two sensationalised cases in 2013 where the accused were granted bail, the laws were pronounced "broken" by media commentators, and Premier Mike Baird announced a review of the new law, only 'weeks' after the law was commenced. A senior law expert at the University of Wollongong, Julia Quilter, stated that denying bail has become a way of condemning the alleged crime of the person, rather than an assurance that they will continue to attend court while the case continues.

The review of the Bail Act 2013 by John Hatzistergos investigated whether the risk management approach adequately reduced the risk that the accused would endanger others' safety, commit a serious offence while on bail, interfere with witnesses in their case, or not attend court; whether the Act was balanced in looking after the safety of the community as well as the rights of the accused; and looking at bail decisions. The review found that the two-stage test as to whether a risk was 'unacceptable' but could be mitigated through bail conditions was confusing to the public, and recommended that the test be altered so that an 'unacceptable risk' was defined as a risk that would preclude granting bail. It recommended adding the following reasons to the 'unacceptable risk' test: the criminal connections of the accused, the views of the victim or the victim's family (for serious offences and where known), and the conduct of the accused toward the victim and his or her family after the event. The review noted that there was little guidance as to what constituted a serious offence. Reforms to the Bail Act passed parliament in September 2014. The burden of proof was placed on people accused of "the most serious crimes" to show why they should be released on bail. The amendment incorporated all the recommendations of the review.

The amendments were described by Quilter, the president of the NSW Bar Association, and a member of the Law Society of NSW as premature and unnecessary, and Quilter and David Brown of UNSW's Law Faculty later wrote that the amendments were likely to "create complexity and confusion" and "have unintended consequences". David Brown, who consulted on the Law Reform Commission's review, suggested that there was a trend to devalue judicial expertise, not requiring evidence before reviewing, and a lack of faith in the ability of the judicial system to self-correct through the appeals process. Another trend Brown noted was the increasing influence of the "shock jocks" to determine public discourse. The amendments came into effect on 28 January 2015.

Lesley Townsley argues that instead of balancing the need for community protection with the rights of the individual, the amendments consider the community's safety as "paramount", and argues that the "show cause" clause introduced by the amendments effectively introduces a "justification" model for release, which Townsley states is "a punitive turn in bail policy which counteracts the weight given to the presumption of innocence and the general right to liberty". Prajesh Shrestha argues that the 2014 amendments undermine the presumption of innocence, because the protection of the community is given more weight than the presumption of innocence, and that the 'show cause' provision gives the burden of proof to the defendant, not the prosecutor and goes against the presumption of innocence, and that adding in the victim's views is unnecessary and "highly prejudicial to the rights of the accused".

Also in September 2014, the Attorney General referred a suggestion by the Police Association of NSW to the NSW Sentencing Council. The suggestion was that "a new show cause category [should] include people charged with a serious indictable offence while 'on sentence'."

John Hatzistergos tabled his final report reviewing the laws in June 2015. The final review focused "on the application of the Bail Act 2013, particularly after the commencement of the Bail Amendment Act 2014", examining bail decisions after 28 January 2015.

== Bail Monitoring Group ==
After the Hatzistergos review in July 2014, a Bail Monitoring Group was formed with representatives from the Department of Justice, the Ministry of Police and Emergency Services, the NSW Police Force, the Office of the Director of Public Prosecutions, NSW Legal Aid Commission, the NSW Bureau of Crime Statistics and Research, and the Department of Premier and Cabinet. It meets monthly, and monitors bail reviews by the NSW Office of the Director of Public Prosecutions.

== Changes sought in response to the Sydney siege ==
After the Lindt Cafe siege, there was a petition on Change.org for further tightening of the NSW bail laws. The gunman, Man Haron Monis, was out on bail at the time of the attack, and determining why this was so was investigated in the inquest. Brad Hazzard stated that if the amendments from 2014 had been in force, it was "very unlikely" that Monis would have been free, but Greg Barns of the Australian Lawyers Alliance stated that the laws "already undermine fundamental human rights" and that "changes made to those laws in the past two years might not have made any difference".

In the NSW Government's response to the joint Federal-State review of the Sydney hostage crisis, it states that in addition to the final stage of the Hatzistergos review, the government will seek to amend the Bail Act further to "ensure that a bail authority must refuse bail where the authority is satisfied that an accused person is an identified terrorist risk". In February 2015, all 17 recommendations of the Martin Place Siege Review were accepted by the NSW Government in addition to modifying existing gun laws so that there are higher penalties for illegal gun possession.

In August 2015, Baird and Deputy Premier and Minister for Justice and Police Troy Grant announced a tightening of laws on bail and illegal firearms, where a person's involvement in terrorism or violent extremism would be included in the 'unacceptable risk' test for bail. Greg Barns, speaking on behalf of the Australian Lawyers Association, described the proposed changes as "authoritarian". Opposition Leader Luke Foley stated that "Anybody who has been caught up in surveillance and been assessed by the security agencies as being a risk of carrying out a terrorist-related offence should not be given any benefit of the doubt".

== Changes in response to tabloid campaign ==
In response to a tabloid campaign around men being granted bail after being convicted of child sexual offenses, the bail laws were amended to require judges to refuse bail "where a person is convicted of a crime where they "will" serve a prison sentence". It also aimed to ensure a minimum standard for electronic surveillance of people on bail.

== Changes in response to the murder of Molly Ticehurst ==
In 2024, Daniel Billings was charged with the murder of Molly Ticehurst, his former partner - he was released on bail at the time of the murder for several violent charges against Ticehurst. In response to this, the bail laws were changed so that people charged with coercive control or serious domestic violence offences – with a maximum penalty of 14 or more years in jail – are either held on remand or electronically monitored.

== Further review ==
The Bail Act 2013 is to be reviewed by the Minister three years after the date when the Bail Act 1978 was repealed. This is to determine whether policy objectives of the Act remain valid and that terms of the Act remain appropriate for securing these objectives. Further, the report of the outcome of review is to be tabled in each House of Parliament within 12 months from the end of the three-year period.

== Key cases ==
=== Supreme Court of New South Wales ===
- R v Kugor [2015] NSWCCA 14
- R v Lago [2014] NSWSC 660
- R v Fesus [2014] NSWSC 770
- R v Alexandridis [2014] NSWSC 662
- R v Morris (NSWSC, Unreported, McCallum J, 20 May 2014)
- R v SK & DK (NSWSC, Unreported, McCallum J, 20 May 2014)
- R v Justice (NSWSC, Unreported, Schmidt J, 28 May 2014)
- R v Karaoglu (NSWSC, Unreported, Adamson J, 10 June 2014)
- R v Daniel (NSWSC, Unreported, Button J, 23 June 2014)

=== New South Wales Court of Appeal ===
- Director of Public Prosecutions (NSW) v Tikomaimaleya [2015] NSWCA 83

=== Other jurisdictions ===
- Haidy v DPP [2004] VSC 247 at [14]-[19]
- R v Paterson [2006] VSC 268 at [29]-[36]
- Mokbel v DPP (No 3) [2002] VSC 393 at [10]
- In the matter of an application for bail by Blundell [2008] ACTSC 138 at [2], citing R v Blaikie [1999] NZCA 205 at [34].
- Re Magee [2009] VSC 384 at [15]-[26]
- Burton v R (1974) 3 ACTR 77, at p. 78
- Re Kheir [2008] VSC 492 at [22]
- R v Wakefield (1969) 89 WN (Pt 1) (NSW) 325
- Woods v DPP [2014] VSC 1
- Dunstan v DPP [1999] FCA 921 at [55]-[56], (1999) 92 FCR 168

== See also ==
- Crimes Act 1900 (NSW)
