= Rukshan =

Rukshan is a given name. Notable people with the name include:

- Rukshan Fernando (born 1984 or 1985), Sri Lankan videographer
- Rukshan Perera (born 1956), Sri Lankan-born singer-songwriter
- Rukshan Shehan (born 1995), Sri Lankan cricketer
