= Bail Act 1978 =

Australian statute

- Coat of Arms of New South Wales

Parliament of New South Wales
- Long title: An Act relating to bail for accused persons in or in connection with criminal proceedings.
- Commenced: 17 March 1980

Amended by
- Bail (Amendment) Act 1986, Bail (Amendment) Act 1987, Bail (Personal and Family Violence) Amendment Act 1987, Bail (Amendment) Act 1988, Bail (Domestic Violence) Amendment Act 1993, Bail Amendment (Repeat Offenders) Act 2002, Bail (Presumption Against Bail) Amendment Act 2007

Repealed by
- Bail Act 2013

Related legislation
- Victims Rights Act 1996
- Status: Repealed

The Bail Act 1978 is a former New South Wales law that has been repealed, and replaced with the Bail Act 2013. While it was considered "groundbreaking" when enacted, it has been reformed several times to increase a presumption against bail.

The original legislation had three classes of eligibility for bail - minor offences where people were entitled to bail, offences where bail was favoured, and a third where there was no recommendation for or against bail.

== Prior to creation ==
Prior to the creation of the Bail Act 1978, the bail system in New South Wales relied on rules in different statutes and common law. The Federal Judiciary Act 1903 states that bail will be governed by state laws - there is no federal law for bail. None of the English Acts concerning bail were adopted under the Imperial Acts Adoption Act 1969. Police "almost invariably" required cash in order to grant bail, although a person could also act as a surety on behalf of the person being bailed and provide a sum of money. In the seventies, the amount of cash needed for bail could range from $500 to sums of five figures. In 1969, the Institute for Criminology at Sydney University Law School ran a seminar suggesting improvements to the bail system, resulting in a proposed system similar to the Manhattan Bail Project. Armstrong suggested in 1977 that migrants were over-represented in jail because they did not have friends or family to act as sureties for them.

== 1976 review ==
In April 1976, the Attorney-General Frank Walker convened a Bail Review Committee "to examine and report on the system of bail in New South Wales". The committee consisted of K.S. Anderson, a stipendiary magistrate, and Susan Armstrong, a lecturer of law at UNSW. The committee's review urged that everyone had the right to be released on bail unless there were strong reasons for refusing it, and recommended that police and the courts should have to show reason why someone should not be granted bail. A study found that bail was more likely to be refused to older people, Aboriginals, "shabby"-looking people (including those wearing beards - possibly a middle-class prejudice), defendants without a lawyer, defendants with a previous criminal record, and defendants who did not ask for bail. Two studies were conducted into bail by the NSW Bureau of Crime Statistics and Research to assist the Committee, their findings were published in 1977. The BoCSaR review noted that cases such as Philip Western, who killed a bank manager while on bail, were capable of triggering reviews of the bail law. While the Committee recommended a presumption in favour of bail for all offenses, an exception was added for violent or armed robbery by the NSW Government. Stubbs states that at that time, "governments took no pleasure in high rates of imprisonment and of remand in custody".

== Police training and introduction ==
After the legislation was passed in December 1978, police were trained in its use. Police described the law as overly complex. The assistant general secretary of the Police Association, Bruce Howe, criticised it as being "completely hopeless", and the Assistant Police Commissioner in charge of training, K. Jensen, suggested that the amount of paperwork involved in the new law would result in police being pulled off the streets unless more personnel were provided. In January 1980, the new law was not yet in force. Due to a shooting on Boxing Day 1979 where the gunman was free on bail, the issue of the bail law was important to the community, and Neville Wran was facing criticism over the law not yet being in force. The Shadow Attorney-General, John Maddison, criticised the government over not including the police when drafting up the new laws.

== Bail Assessment Service and Supervision Program (1983) ==
After the law was enacted, it became evident that bail was not being granted to as many people as the law had intended. A Bail Assessment Service and Supervision Program (BASS) was set up, based on research from courts in the United States and Europe which were influenced by the Manhattan Bail Project. A pilot program began in January 1983 and ran for six months in an inner city area. Magistrates found the information provided by the BASS program helpful and granted bail to two thirds of applicants who had been refused bail by the police.

== 1988 Amendments ==
In 1988, the bail law was amended to introduce a class of offences where the presumption was against granting bail, the Bail (Amendment) Act 1988. The Bail (Further Amendment) Act 1988 ensured people retained a presumption in favour of bail for minor offences.

== 1998 Amendment ==
The Bail Amendment Act 1998 reduced the presumption in favour of bail for manslaughter, wounding with intent, kidnapping, aggravated sexual assault, sexual intercourse with a child under 10, and assault with intent to commit sexual intercourse with a child under 10. This act was linked to the Bega schoolgirl murders.

== 2002 Amendments ==
In June 2001 the Police Commissioner called for changes to the bail law in regards to repeat offenders. The 2002 amendments removed the presumption in favour of bail for some kinds of repeat offenders. These amendments have been described as being part of the lead-up to the 2003 election, where both the government and opposition were trying to show the electorate that they were tough on crime. They added in provisions aimed at "increasing access to bail" for Aboriginal and Torres Strait Islander people, juveniles and intellectually disabled or mentally ill people. A 2004 study found that these measures did not have the effect of increasing access to bail for Indigenous people or juveniles. The amendments created to allow rehabilitation as being part of bail conditions have been described as an attempt at therapeutic jurisprudence, but have garnered criticism as making the bail process part of the punishment.

== 2003 ==
In 2003, a woman was murdered by her estranged husband, and this prompted further review of the Bail Act.

== Section 22A ==
The original Bail Act did not limit the number of bail applications. Section 22A is a section of the law introduced in 2007 which aimed to reduce frivolous bail applications. However, it had the effect of increasing the number of people in remand, particularly young people. Due to the section giving one chance for bail, legal counsel would as a matter of course advise their clients not to apply for bail early on, leading to accused persons being put on remand.

== Criticism ==
New South Wales has been described as the "most punitive" state when it comes to amendments to its bail legislation. The Bail Bill 2010 removed several criteria to ensure the rights of the person accused. Alex Steel commented that this would make it harder for the person accused to make a case, because prisoners on remand are automatically placed in maximum security. As of 2010, a lobby group called the Bail Reform Alliance campaigned for changes to the law. Members of the Alliance included the NSW Law Society, NSW Young Lawyers, the Public Service Association, the NSW Council for Civil Liberties and the NSW Welfare Rights Centre. A study in 2011 found that between 1999 and 2008, there had been a decline in the percentage of cases where bail was given without any conditions attached. It found that this was not due to a difference in the cases in 2008 from 1999, but instead there was stricter conditions being attached to bail in later years. Furthermore, the study pointed out that bail conditions leaves the defendant 'vulnerable to re-arrest' for further offenses or for breaching their bail conditions, and that even when breach of bail conditions does not involve an offense, it often leads to remand.

During the period of 1978 to 2007, the Bail Act 1978 was one of the most frequently amended pieces of legislation, being amended every 4.5 months.

== Review and repeal ==
On 9 June 2011, Premier Barry O'Farrell announced that the NSW Law Reform Commission would review the bail law. In April 2012, the Commission reported that the Bail Act 1978 had become complex, making it difficult even for legal practitioners to understand and apply. It noted that over the 15 years prior, the population in remand had tripled due to "policy shifts". It recommended a new, simplified, bail law, to be written in "plain English".

== See also ==
- Crimes Act 1900 (NSW)
