= Friendlyjordies =

Australian YouTuber (born 1989)

Jordan Shanks
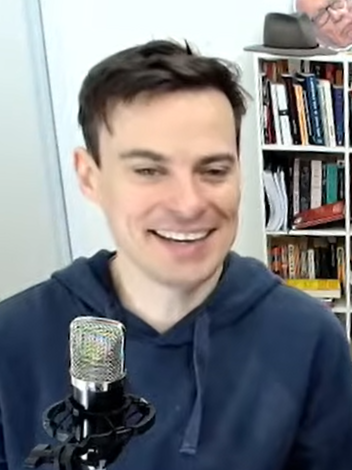
- Shanks in 2026
- Born: Jordan Shanks-Markovina; 18 August 1989 (age 37); New South Wales, Australia
- Education: University of New South Wales
- Occupations: Independent journalist; YouTuber; stand-up comedian

YouTube information
- Channel: friendlyjordies
- Years active: 2013–present
- Genres: Australian culture; comedy; journalism; political commentary
- Subscribers: 1.42 million
- Views: 343 million
- Last updated: 17 June 2026
- Website: friendlyjordies.com

Jordan Shanks-Markovina (born 18 August 1989), also known online as friendlyjordies, is an Australian journalist, political commentator and stand-up comedian. His content focuses on Australian politics, culture and current affairs, often using what he describes as "lowbrow humour". Shanks's YouTube channel, created in February 2013, has over 1.4 million subscribers and 343 million views as of June 2026. He has interviewed several Australian politicians, including Jodi McKay, Tanya Plibersek, Kristina Keneally, Bill Shorten, Helen Dalton, and former prime minister Kevin Rudd.

Legal disputes and controversies involving Shanks include being sued for defamation by former New South Wales deputy premier John Barilaro, after Shanks made YouTube videos criticising Barilaro and accusing him of corruption and environmental vandalism. In November 2022, his house was firebombed by an associate of the Alameddine crime network, with police alleging that the attack was in retaliation for a video Shanks made linking the crime family to the Coronation Property Group. The video was removed in February 2024 after Shanks received death threats.

== Early life ==
Shanks was born on 18 August 1989. He graduated from Newtown High School of the Performing Arts, and later obtained a Bachelor of International Studies specialising in Globalisation Studies at the University of New South Wales. Prior to becoming a YouTuber, he was a model. Shanks is of Croatian descent.

== YouTube career ==
Shanks's channel is primarily focused on comedy videos and political commentary, often in support of the Labor Party and critical of the Liberal and National (Coalition) parties. He describes his commentary as focusing on "lowbrow humour".

Shanks created his YouTube channel in 2013 after being unable to find appealing work in traditional media. His initial videos consisted of skits. In September 2013, he uploaded his first political video, a satirical analysis of the 2013 Australian federal election. The video went viral, and from that point he began to shift his content towards politics.

=== 2016–2023: Miscellaneous ===
In 2016, he campaigned against the Sydney lockout laws. In 2020, The Daily Telegraph journalist Joe Hildebrand made a complaint to New South Wales police accusing Shanks of stalking and harassment. The police laid no charges.

In July 2021, Shanks released an hour-long self-produced documentary entitled Blood Water: the war for Australia's water, discussing floodplain harvesting in rural New South Wales and particularly Riverina. In the video, the practice of floodplain harvesting was described as "water theft". In 2022, Shanks interviewed Twitter commentator PRGuy, who revealed himself to be Jeremy Maluta, circumventing an attempt by far-right provocateur Avi Yemini to identify the owner of the account through legal action. In May 2022, Shanks made a cameo appearance as a current affairs reporter in an episode of Housos, which was titled "The Thong Warrior". He also voiced several minor characters in the animated television series Koala Man in January 2023.

=== 2019–2020: Bushfires ===
In 2019 and 2020, Shanks released multiple videos alleging that the then New South Wales premier Gladys Berejiklian was one of the main people responsible for increasing the risk of bushfires and the destruction of the koala population in Australia. He created the Twitter hashtag #koalakiller, in reference to Berejiklian. On 10 June 2020, Shanks released an interview with New South Wales Opposition Leader Jodi McKay, discussing topics including the state and federal governments' response to the 2019–20 Australian bushfire season, including widespread deaths of animals. Shanks raised A$300,000 for bushfire relief from his stand-up shows and sales of #koalakiller t-shirts.

=== 2019: Clive Palmer ===
In 2019, Shanks published a video covering businessman Clive Palmer, who was running in the 2019 Australian federal election. There were existing allegations of financial irregularity in the liquidation of Palmer's company Queensland Nickel and allegations of failure to pay the company's workers, which Shanks covered, alongside satirising Palmer's behaviour and appearance. In response, Palmer threatened a defamation lawsuit, demanding A$500,000 and that Shanks cease making public statements about him. Shanks said he would not "capitulate" and released merchandise containing the statements in question. In a video addressing Palmer, he said "one tiny miscalculation. I'm a millennial. Going bankrupt doesn't scare me. I don't have a house." Commentators noted that Palmer appeared to have created a Streisand effect. Other commentators said that Palmer's legal threat was substantially similar to a SLAPP suit and that such threats had a 'chilling effect' on public interest reporting.

=== 2020–2022: John Barilaro ===
In a political commentary video uploaded 29 June 2020, Shanks included an impersonation of John Barilaro, Deputy Premier of New South Wales, which Barilaro described as "very offensive" and "full of racist undertones". Shanks subsequently filmed a video inside a rental property owned by Barilaro, accusing him of corruption and environmental vandalism. In May 2021, Shanks published a letter sent by Barilaro in December 2020, in which Barilaro threatened to sue for defamation. In response, Shanks turned up dressed as the video game character Luigi at a National Party event at Macquarie University where Barilaro was giving a speech. Barilaro lodged defamation proceedings against Shanks on 27 May 2021. On 8 July 2021, Shanks's legal team responded by filing a truth defence, supported by an honest opinion defence for a subset of claims.

In June 2021, friendlyjordies producer Kristo Langker was arrested by officers from the Fixated Persons Unit (FPU), a specialised counterterrorism police unit, established in response to the 2014 Lindt Cafe siege, that often targets lone wolf terrorists. Langker was charged with two counts of stalking and intimidating Barilaro after Langker had approached Barilaro at a National Party event with Shanks and on a separate occasion when Langker encountered Barilaro while on his way to university. Langker's lawyer Mark Davis contested the police's accounts, and he denounced the timing of the arrest being soon after the defamation lawsuit commenced and criticised the use of the FPU. In August 2021, it was revealed that Barilaro had been in contact with the FPU regarding Shanks for at least six months prior to Langker's arrest. This contradicted Barilaro's earlier claim to Sky News Australia host Tom Connell that he had not requested the FPU become involved. In October 2021, John Barilaro resigned as Deputy Premier of New South Wales and as the member for Monaro, citing his defamation case against Shanks as a "big reason" for the decision.

In November 2021, Barilaro settled the defamation case with Shanks, and Shanks issued the following apology: "Mr Shanks accepts that some of the videos he posted were offensive to Mr Barilaro. Mr Shanks understands that Mr Barilaro has been hurt, and apologises to him for that hurt." Shanks was required to pay A$100,000 in legal costs, and Barilaro received no damages from the settlement. Shanks agreed to edit some of the contested videos, which would remain online, and to stop selling merchandise featuring Barilaro after Barilaro's retirement from politics.

On 10 March 2022, the NSW Police dropped all charges against Langker. The conduct of the NSW Fixated Persons Unit came under scrutiny when Attorney General Mark Speakman was questioned about the case during budget estimates. Speakman refused to comment further, conceding that the matter may appear before the Law Enforcement Conduct Commission. On 6 June 2022, the Federal Court awarded Barilaro A$715,000 in defamation damages from Google for the YouTube videos, and referred Shanks and Google for possible prosecution for contempt of court.

=== 2020–2023: ClubsNSW ===
In 2020, Troy Stolz was a compliance officer employed by gambling lobby group ClubsNSW. Stolz contacted journalists and federal MP Andrew Wilkie, alleging that clubs in NSW were engaged in widespread non-compliance with anti-money laundering laws. Following this, ClubsNSW terminated Stolz's employment. Stolz sued for unfair dismissal, and ClubsNSW counter-sued for unlawful use of confidential information. In 2021, Shanks uploaded multiple videos to the friendlyjordies channel where he criticised ClubsNSW, including a video interview with Troy Stolz titled "The legal way to take a life", in which Stolz detailed his battle with cancer and the impact of his federal court dispute with his former employer ClubsNSW.

ClubsNSW began a private prosecution against both Shanks and Stolz in 2022, alleging that the video interview constituted contempt of court, because of a previous federal court order which restrained Stolz from making any public statements which were designed to "intimidate, harass, or otherwise bring improper pressure" on ClubsNSW. ClubsNSW argued that contempt proceedings should be held in secret, stating that public hearings would give Shanks and Stolz the "opportunity to escalate attacks against ClubsNSW and its legal representatives". In July 2022, ClubsNSW sought and obtained an interim suppression order without either Shanks or Stolz having a chance to argue against it. Subsequently, the video interview was taken down. On 2 September 2022, the application for the suppression order was heard in full and was declined by the court.

In October 2022, the NSW Crime Commission released a report stating that criminals were laundering billions of dollars using poker machines in NSW clubs and pubs. In February 2023, ClubsNSW discontinued all legal action against Shanks and Stolz. The withdrawal of the proceedings came after the chief executive of ClubsNSW, Josh Landis, was fired.

=== 2022–present: Firebombing incidents ===
On 19 August 2022, Shanks published a video titled "Coronation", where he discussed John Barilaro's new employment at the Sydney-based property developer Coronation Property Group, and he revealed links between Coronation and the Alameddine organised crime family. Police launched investigations into two attempts to burn down Shanks's house in Bondi Beach: one attempt on 17 November 2022, which mistakenly targeted his next-door neighbour; and another on 23 November 2022, which successfully burned down his home. In a statement, Shanks's lawyers said that his home had been "firebombed", and that he was not home at the time of the attacks.

In December 2023, Tufi Junior Tauese-Auelua, an associate of the Alameddine crime network, was arrested by police and charged with two counts of destroying or damaging property by fire. The NSW police stated that there was a "strong possibility" the attack was retaliation for Shanks's video alleging links between the Alameddine crime network and the Coronation Property Group. Friendlyjordies producer Kristo Langker reported to police that ABC reporter Mahmood Fazal repeatedly informed him in January 2024 that Fazal had been communicating with "very serious gang figures" who were threatening that "something bad is going to happen" if the "Coronation" video was not deleted from YouTube. In February 2024, Shanks removed the video from his channel, citing non-specific death threats as the reason. In September 2025, Tauese-Auelua was sentenced to five years in jail over the firebombing.

In October 2025, messages allegedly from Four Corners reporter Mahmood Fazal were leaked and were reported to contain threats directed at Shanks. When asked, Fazal claimed that the messages expressing his desire to "kill" Shanks had been falsified, while others were taken out of context. Fazal was sacked by the ABC in May 2026 after doubts arose concerning the authenticity of some of his anonymous informers. Several programs which relied heavily on his reporting have been pulled from the Internet, and segments of other programs in which he appeared prominently were edited out.

== Political views ==
Shanks is a supporter of the Australian Labor Party, and has described himself as an "unapologetic Labor shill". He has interviewed a number of prominent Labor politicians, including Kevin Rudd, Jodi McKay, Kristina Keneally, Tanya Plibersek, Kate Washington, and Bill Shorten. During the 2022 Australian federal election, he stated that "the best outcome for Australia in this election is going to be a Labor victory". Shanks has stated: "Liberals will always vote in the interests of corporations – that's all you need to know. Labor will compromise with corporations to get a better deal for workers and the average Australian, and the Greens will take the moral high ground". He has been described as having a "prominent streak of pragmatism".

He has been critical of the Australian Greens due to perceiving them as obstructionist for historically blocking legislation put forward by Labor, such as the Carbon Pollution Reduction Scheme. Simultaneously, he has expressed support for Legalise Cannabis Australia due to their cooperation with Labor in Victoria. He has also been critical of teal independents, asserting that their policies are similar to those of the Liberal Party and questioning their progressive credentials.

Shanks has been described as having "positions on many environmental issues [which] accord with core Labor principles" and has been praised for covering environmental issues which have been overlooked by traditional media. He has said that "[while the] values of the Greens are obviously correct, they are an activist party whereas Labor is a governing party". He has stated that he does not receive funding from, or have any formal links with, any branch of the Labor Party; however, Shanks has disclosed that some of his videos have been "funded by unions, GetUp, Greenpeace, and other left-wing organisations".

On foreign affairs, he has criticised the influence of the United States on Australian politics. He endorsed the Chinese Communist Party's one-party state model of governance.

== Works ==
- FriendlyJordies (17 April 2024). Foreword. Better Man: A Manifesto on Modern Masculinity. By Butterfield, Isaac. ISBN 978-1761285554.
