= Bail Act =

Bail Act may refer to:

- Bail Act 1898, act of the Parliament of the United Kingdom
- Bail Act 1978, New South Wales law
- Bail Act 2013, New South Wales law
- Bail Act (New Zealand), a 2000 statute of New Zealand
