= Ministry for Police and Emergency Services (New South Wales) =

Former government department in Australia

Government Department overview
- Formed: 4 April 2011
- Preceding agencies: New South Wales Ministry for Police; Security and Recovery Co-ordination Branch and Law Enforcement Policy Branch of the Department of Premier and Cabinet; Disaster Welfare section of the Department of Human Services; and; Emergency Management NSW
- Dissolved: 1 July 2015
- Superseding Government Department: Department of Justice
- Jurisdiction: New South Wales
- Headquarters: Level 2, Quad 1, 8 Parkview Drive, Sydney Olympic Park, New South Wales, Australia
- Minister responsible: Hon. Troy Grant MP, Minister for Police and Minister for Emergency Services
- Website: www.emergency.nsw.gov.au/aboutus

The New South Wales Ministry for Police and Emergency Services, a former department of the Government of New South Wales between April 2011 and July 2015, had responsibility for the development and coordination of law enforcement and emergency management policy and advice to the Ministers for Police and for Emergency Services. Up until its abolition, the Ministry was also responsible for the coordination of recovery functions including disaster welfare services.

At the time of its abolition, the Minister for Police and Minister for Emergency Services was the Hon. Troy Grant MP.

The role of the Ministry also encompassed operational and planning issues which affect the economic, environmental and social well-being of the State, by providing the framework to prepare for and recover from disasters caused by natural means or a terrorist incident. It had a leading role in ensuring the delivery of appropriate policies and plans by other portfolio agencies to the people of NSW. The Ministry's role was wide-ranging, spanning policy development, ministerial support, operational coordination, crisis management, grants administration, delivery of training and control of several websites and public communications platforms.

The functions of the Ministry, along with broader responsibilities, were transferred to the Department of Justice on 1 July 2015.

== Structure ==
The following agencies were subsidiaries within the Ministry:

- Police:
  - New South Wales Crime Commission
  - New South Wales Police Force
  - New South Wales Police Integrity Commission
- Emergency Services:
  - New South Wales State Emergency Service
  - State Emergency Management Committee
  - State Rescue Board
