= Something's Happening (song) =

"Something's Happening" may refer to the following songs:

- "For What It's Worth", 1966 song by Buffalo Springfield, also known as "Something's Happening Here"
- "Something's Happening" (Herman's Hermits song), 1968
- "Something's Happening" (KC and the Sunshine Band song), 1981
- "Something's Happening" (Eric Clapton song), 1985
- "Something Is Happening", song by Rukshan Perera

== See also ==
- Somethin's Happening, 1974 album by Peter Frampton
