= Code of silence (disambiguation) =

A code of silence is a condition in effect when a person opts to withhold what is believed to be vital or important information voluntarily or involuntarily.

Code of Silence may also refer to:

- "Code of Silence", a song by Billy Joel from the 1986 album The Bridge
- Code of Silence (1985 film), a 1985 film starring Chuck Norris
- Code of Silence (2014 film), a 2014 Australian film
- Code of Silence (2015 film), a 2015 Nigerian film
- Code of Silence (2025 TV series), a 2025 British crime drama TV series
- Code of Silence (2021 film), a 2021 British film starring Stephen Moyer
- "Code of Silence" (Arrow), a 2016 episode of the American series Arrow

== See also ==
- Omerta (disambiguation), Mafia code of silence
