= Inspector of the Police Integrity Commission =

Defunct statutory office in NSW, Australia

The Inspector of the Police Integrity Commission was a statutory position which oversaw the Police Integrity Commission in New South Wales, a state of Australia.

The principal functions of the inspector were to:

- audit the operations of the commission for the purpose of monitoring compliance with the law;
- deal with complaints of abuse of power, impropriety and other forms of misconduct on the part of the commission or officers of the commission by reporting upon them; and
- assessing the effectiveness and appropriateness of the procedures of the Commission relating to the legality or propriety of its activities.

M. D. Ireland QC was appointed as the first inspector on 12 June 2002.

On 1 September 2005 James Wood QC, the former NSW Police Royal Commissioner, was appointed as the inspector.

David Levine AO RFD QC was appointed from 1 February 2012, replacing Peter Moss.

The Inspector of the Police Integrity Commission was abolished along with the Police Integrity Commission on 1 July 2017. The succeeding body, the Law Enforcement Conduct Commission, has an equivalent oversight position, the Inspector of the Law Enforcement Conduct Commission.
