= Crimes Act 1900 =

Legislation of NSW, Australia that establishes a majority of criminal offences

Parliament of New South Wales
- Long title: An Act to consolidate the Statutes relating to Criminal Law.
- Citation: No. 40, 1900
- Territorial extent: New South Wales
- Assented to by: Governor William Lygon
- Assented to: 31 October 1900
- Administered by: Attorney General of New South Wales
- Status: Amended

The Crimes Act 1900 (NSW) is an act of the Parliament of New South Wales that defines an extensive list of offences and sets out punishments for the majority of criminal offences in New South Wales (NSW), Australia. The act, alongside the Crimes Act 1914 (Cth) and the Criminal Code Act 1995 (Cth), form the almost complete basis of criminal law for the state. It is the primary criminal law statute of NSW. It applied in the Australian Capital Territory as existing law when the territory was formed, and continues to apply there with different amendments to New South Wales as the Crimes Act 1900 (ACT).

== The act ==
=== Serious offences ===
==== Murder ====
The act requires that, for a person to be guilty of murder in NSW, the prosecution must prove both actus reus (literally: guilty act) and mens rea (literally: guilty mind). The act must cause the death of a person without lawful excuse – A causes B's death. It was previously a requirement that death occur within a year and a day after the date on which the person received the injury, however that has been abolished in NSW.

The guilty mind may be one of three different states of mind: an intent to kill, an intent to commit grievous bodily harm, or reckless indifference to human life. If A intended to kill B, whether it was premeditated or on the spur of the moment, A is guilty of murder. Similarly if A intended to kill B but instead killed C, A is guilty of murder. The culpability of the person does not depend on whether the person intended to kill, or was recklessly indifferent.

Moreover, a person is also guilty of murder if the act causing death was done with the intent to cause grievous bodily harm. Grievous bodily harm includes any permanent or serious disfiguring, death of a fetus, or causing a person to contract a grievous bodily disease. If A intentionally inflicts grievous bodily harm on B and B dies, then A is guilty of B's murder.

The more difficult concept for culpability is "reckless indifference to human life". The accused must be aware of the probability (as opposed to possibility), that the accused's act would result in a person's death (as opposed to merely resulting in grievous bodily harm). That is A saw that his actions carried a probability of B's death. Douglas Crabbe was convicted of murder when he drove a truck into a pub in which he knew it was highly likely that people would be killed. (Note: Crabbe's original conviction was set aside because the judge erred in summing up to the jury of what was meant by reckless indifference. Crabbe was convicted of five counts of murder at a second trial and sentenced to life imprisonment :R v Crabbe [2004] NTSC 63, Supreme Court (NT).) In R v Faure the Victorian Court of Appeal described "probable" as meaning "a substantial, or real and not remote, chance, whether or not it is more than 50 per cent". Similarly, it was held in Darkan v R, that "probable must be distinguished from merely possible".

As long as one of these above mental states is present, and given that the test of causation is satisfied, the intended method of death becomes irrelevant. For example, in Royall v R, the High Court upheld a murder conviction obtained when a woman died from jumping out of a window to avoid an attempt from her partner to inflict grievous bodily harm upon her. The court ruled "It is immaterial that the death was caused in a way which the applicant did not precisely foresee."

The final level is constructive murder (also termed felony murder) in which A kills B (even if unintentionally - the only question that can be raised is whether the act was voluntary or not) during or immediately after the commission of a crime, or during an attempt to commit a crime. The crime that qualifies the murder as 'constructive murder' must be a crime that is punishable by imprisonment for either 25 years or life.

The maximum penalty for murder is life imprisonment. A court will use discretion in determining the sentence and will only impose life imprisonment if "the level of culpability in the commission of the offence is so extreme" and it is in the interest of "retribution, punishment, community protection and deterrence". Life imprisonment means imprisonment for “natural life”. Section 19B mandates a sentence of life imprisonment (subject to some exceptions) if the victim is a police officer killed in the execution of his or her duty, or in retaliation for past execution of duty, and the accused knew, or ought reasonably to have known, the victim was a police officer and intended to kill the police officer.

==== Manslaughter ====
Where the prosecution cannot establish the necessary actus reus and mens rea elements of murder beyond reasonable doubt, the accused may be convicted of manslaughter. Manslaughter carries a maximum sentence of 25 years imprisonment.

=== Publicly threatening and inciting violence law ===
In June 2018, both houses of the Parliament of New South Wales unanimously passed and the Governor of New South Wales signed an urgent bill without amendments called the Crimes Amendment (Publicly Threatening and Inciting Violence) Bill 2018 to repeal the vilification laws within the Anti-Discrimination Act 1977 and replace it with criminal legislation with up to an explicit three-year term of imprisonment within this act. The legislation went into effect on 13 August 2018 by proclamation on 10 August 2018.

=== Other provisions ===
Division 3 of the act covers attempts to murder, while Division 5 relates to attempting or aiding suicide.

Punishment for crimes deemed as 'common assault' is set out in Division 9. Aggravated assault includes assault with further specific intent, assault causing particular injuries (actual bodily harm, and grievous bodily harm, assault with offensive weapons or dangerous substances ("offensive weapon or instrument" is defined in s 4 of the Crimes Act) and assaults on victims of special status, such as:

- a child at the time of birth;
- a child under the age of 7;
- wives, apprentices, servants and insane people;
- clergy engaged in their duties;
- persons endeavouring to preserve a vessel in distress;
- a member of the crew of an aircraft or vessel whilst on board.

The criminal offence of sexual assault is located in Division 10, which includes the definition of "sexual intercourse"; consent in relation to sexual assault offences; the elements of the offence of sexual assault; aggravated sexual assault; aggravated sexual assault in company; and assault with intent to have intercourse;

== Amendments ==
After the death of Thomas Kelly in 2012, the NSW Parliament introduced the "one-punch-law". This law mandates a minimum sentence of 8 years to the maximum sentence of 25 years for assault causing death in intoxicated (alcohol/drug) conditions. and maximum sentence of 20 years for assault causing death without intoxicated conditions. There is also no requirement to prove the assailant knew the punch would be fatal.

In November 2021, "Zoe's Law" was passed within NSW under the Crimes Act 1900. This amendment criminalises criminal acts that cause a foetus to be lost as a result of a wide range of criminal acts (such as dangerous driving or grievous bodily harm).

== See also ==
- Crimes Act
- Bail Act 2013
