= James Roland Wood =

Australian royal commissioner

The Honourable James Roland Tomson Wood AO, KC (born 1941) is the chairman of Law Reform Commission of New South Wales, the chairman of the New South Wales Sentencing Council, the Inspector of the Police Integrity Commission and a former judge in Australia. He is currently a judge of the Fiji Court of Appeal.

== Early years ==
Wood was born in Sydney in 1941.

He attended Knox Grammar School and the University of Sydney, graduating with the University Medal in Law in 1964.

== Career ==
Wood was admitted as a solicitor of the Supreme Court of New South Wales in 1964. He was called to the bar in 1970 and subsequently became a Queen's Counsel.

He was appointed a judge of the Supreme Court of New South Wales in 1984 and became the Chief Judge at Common Law in 1984 before retiring in 2005. He served as chairman of the Law Reform Commission of New South Wales between 1982 and 1984. During his time as a judge, he served as a royal commissioner in the New South Wales police royal commission.

He is widely recognized as a conservative judge, who is mostly known for his involvement in the case of the murder of Leigh Leigh. In this case a 14-year-old female victim was gang raped, mutilated, tortured and her body discarded on a beach in New South Wales. Woods was widely criticized for his judgement as he shifted the blame of the rape and murder partly on the underaged victim. After being the presiding judge in this case, he went to dismiss the appeal of this case as head of the Crime Commission.

He is currently the chairman of both the New South Wales Law Reform Commission and the New South Wales Sentencing Council. In November 2008 he released the Report of the Special Commission of Inquiry into Child Protection Services in NSW. The inquiry reported on what changes were required within the child protection system to improve the safety of children and families in NSW.

Wood is also Patron of Pathfinders, an Armidale-based not for profit organisation that supports vulnerable and disadvantaged children and communities.

== Honours ==
He received an AO in 2000 for "service to the community as Royal Commissioner into the New South Wales Police Service, and to the judiciary as a Judge of the Supreme Court of New South Wales".

Legal offices
Preceded by Michael Adams	Chairman of the Law Reform Commission of New South Wales; 2006 – present	Incumbent
