= Omerta (disambiguation) =

Omertà is a code of behaviour usually associated with Italian Mafias.

Omerta may also refer to:

- Omerta (2008 film), a 2008 Cuban film
- Omerta (2017 film), a 2017 Indian film
- Omertà (comics) or Paulie Provenzano, a fictional character in the Marvel Comics universe
- Omertà (novel), a 2000 novel by Mario Puzo
- "Omertà" (Millennium), an episode of the American television series Millennium
- Omerta (TV series), a 1996 Quebec television series
  - Omertà (2012 film), a feature film sequel to the series
- Omerta 6/12, a 2021 Finnish film

== In videogames ==
- The Omertas, a faction in the 2010 video game Fallout: New Vegas
- Omerta (video game), a browser-based text MMORPG
- Omerta – City of Gangsters, a management simulation and a turn-based tactical combat video game with a cover system and stealth action

== Music ==
- "Omertà" (Drake song), a song from The Best in the World Pack by Drake
- "Omertà", a song by The Afghan Whigs from 1965
- "Omerta", a song by Lamb of God from Ashes of the Wake
- "Omerta", a song from Viva Emptiness by Katatonia
- Omertà (Adrenaline Mob album), 2012
- Omertà (J Balvin and Ryan Castro album), a collaborative album by Colombian artists J Balvin and Ryan Castro, announced in 2026.
- Omerta (Richie Beirach and Dave Liebman album), a 1978 album by Richard Beirach and David Leibman
- Omerta (band), an English indie rock band

== See also ==
- Code of silence (disambiguation), translation of omerta
