= New South Wales Sentencing Council =

Advisory body

Advisory body overview
- Jurisdiction: New South Wales, Australia
- Minister responsible: Gabrielle Upton, NSW Attorney-General
- Advisory body executive: James Wood AO, QC, Chairman
- Website: sentencingcouncil.justice.nsw.gov.au

The New South Wales Sentencing Council is an advisory body established by the New South Wales Government to provide guidelines and to promote consistency in sentencing of offenders in New South Wales, a state of Australia. The council provides advice and counsel to the Attorney General of New South Wales on issues relating to sentencing, parole periods for sentences, trends, and the operation of parole. The council aims to promote consistency and transparency in sentencing and promoting public understanding of the sentencing process. The Sentencing Council consists of members appointed by the attorney general. Those members are made up from a diverse background to better represent the views of the community. They include retired judges, law enforcement officers, defence lawyers, indigenous community members and persons associated with victims of crime.

The council provides similar functions to other bodies in New South Wales and in Australia. For example, it may advocate law reform which overlaps the work of the New South Wales Law Reform Commission, or it may analyse statistics which overlaps the work of the Australian Bureau of Statistics. However, it differs fundamentally from other legal bodies in that it provides guidance and advice to government in that its focus is primarily criminal, and includes members who have direct and relevant experience with the criminal justice system.

The council was the first of its type established in Australia. A similar body has been established in Victoria which is called the Victorian Sentencing Council. Outside of Australia, overseas council perform similar functions. The United States Sentencing Commission in the United States of America and the Sentencing Council in England and Wales are examples of bodies which consist primarily of judicial members, giving those bodies a judicial flavour. In contrast, the Sentencing Commission for Scotland is made up of parliamentarians, giving it a political flavour. The New South Wales council attempts to balance each of these flavours by including a cross-section of the community within the council.

== History of sentencing councils ==
The Australian Law Reform Commission notes that there has been a history in common law countries of the use of specific commissions to advise and report on sentencing practices. In 1833 in the United Kingdom, commissioners were appointed to report on consolidating all crimes and the laws relating to crimes into one Act of Parliament. Over a fifteen-year period, the commissioners reported upon many issues and problems concerning punishment and sentencing in criminal matters. They made recommendations about the grading of penalties to suit the crime and also about limiting judicial discretion in the determination a penalty. Few of the recommendations however became law.

In 1980, the Australian Law Reform Commission proposed the establishment of a national council to deal with federal offenders. This council was to be tentatively called the Australian Sentencing Council. The recommendation was not taken up by the Australian Government. In 1988, the commission recommended the establishment of a sentencing council within the Australian Institute of Criminology. Again, that recommendation was not taken up. In 2006, the commission reversed its view on the establishment of a national council and advocated that the existing federal institutions were adequate to provide advice and research. Primarily this was based on the view that the proposed council would duplicate and overlap existing bodies which provided crime statistics and law reform advice to the Australian Government. It however commended the work of the existing state based councils.

== Composition ==
The council was initially composed of ten members who were to be appointed by the attorney general. Members could be appointed for a three-year term, and could also be appointed for further three-year terms from time to time. The attorney general also had the authority to appoint deputies to the members, so that the deputy could attend the council in the absence of the member.

Members include:

- a retired judicial officer,
- a person with expertise or experience in law enforcement,
- various persons who have expertise or experience in criminal law or sentencing,
- a person who has expertise or experience in the area of prosecution
- a person who has expertise or experience in the area of defence
- a person who has expertise or experience in Aboriginal justice matters
- four are to be persons representing the general community, of whom two are to have expertise or experience in matters associated with victims of crime.

=== Current members ===
The legislation was changed in 2006 to expand the number of members of the council to thirteen. All members and deputy members continue to be appointed by the attorney general. As of August 2016, the current members are:

Name	Title
The Hon. James Wood AO, QC	Chairperson
The Hon. Anthony Whealy AO, QC	Deputy Chairperson
His Honor Acting Judge Paul Cloran	
Mr Howard W Brown OAM	Victims of Crime Assistance League
Mr Lloyd Babb SC	NSW Director of Public Prosecutions
Assistant Commissioner Mark Jenkins APM	New South Wales Police Force
Mr Mark Ierace SC	
Mr Nicholas Cowdery AM, SC	Former Director of Public Prosecutions
Professor Megan Davis	Aboriginal activist and human rights lawyer
Ms Tracey Booth	Community Representative
Ms Moira Magrath	Community Representative
Mr Peter Severin	Commissioner, Corrective Services NSW
Mr Ken Marslew AM	Enough is Enough Anti-Violence Movement
Mr Wayne Gleeson	
Professor David Tait	

=== Notable former members ===
The inaugural members of the NSW Sentencing Council were:

Name	Title
The Honourable Alan Abadee RFD QC	Chairperson
Mrs Jennifer Fullford	Community Representative
Ms Martha Jabour	Community Representative (Homicide Victims Support Group)
Mr Peter Zahra SC	Senior Public Defender
Hon J P Slattery AO, QC	NSW Bar Association
Commander John Laycock	NSW Police
Professor Larissa Behrendt - Aboriginal Justice Representative	Jumbunna Indigenous House of Learning

== Reports ==
One of the functions of the council is to make reports specific to sentencing. Since the commencement of the council, the council has made numerous reports to the attorney general. The attorney general has authorised the following reports to be made public and they are available on the council’s website:

- Sentencing Trends and Practices 2005-2006
- Abolishing Prison Sentences of Six Months or Less
- Whether Attempt and Accessorial Offences should be included in the Standard Non-Parole Sentencing Scheme
- Firearms Offences and the Standard Non-Parole Sentencing Scheme
- How Best to Promote Consistency in Sentencing in the Local Court
- Seeking a Guideline Judgment on Suspended Sentences.

== See also ==
- Children's Court of New South Wales
- List of New South Wales courts and tribunals

== Sources ==
- "Sentencing", ALRC Report 44, Australian Law Reform Commission
- Crimes (Sentencing Procedure) Act 1992 (NSW)
