= Manny Waks =

Australian activist (born 1976)

- Born: Menachem Leib Waks; 1976 (age 49–50); Israel
- Occupation: Community activist
- Known for: Founding Tzedek, an anti-abuse organisation
- Website: MannyWaks.com

Menachem Leib "Manny" Waks (born 1976) is an Australian activist. He was previously part of the Orthodox Jewish community in Australia and later became known for his activism against child sexual abuse in the Jewish community worldwide. He founded Tzedek, an organisation to fight child sexual abuse in Jewish communities. Waks assisted the Royal Commission into Institutional Responses to Child Sexual Abuse in investigating Melbourne Yeshivah centre of the Orthodox Chabad movement of Judaism on their handling of child sexual abuse cases. After publicising child sexual abuse in the Jewish community in Australia, Waks moved to France.

== Early life and education ==
Born Menachem Leib Waks in Israel, Waks was raised primarily in Australia. He is one of 17 children born to Orthodox Jewish parents, Zephaniah (formerly Stephen) and Hava, who were part of the Chabad-Lubavitch Orthodox Jewish Hasidic community in Melbourne. Before the Waks family were eventually ostracised by their ultra-Orthodox community for reporting child sexual abuse within it, they were viewed as a "poster family for the Australian Chabad movement." and featured in the 2003 SBS documentary Welcome to the Waks Family. One of Manny's younger brothers (from whom he was formerly estranged) is Avi Yemini. Yemini is a notable contributor of Rebel News, a far-right Canadian website.

Waks returned to Israel when he turned 18, where he served in the Israel Defense Forces (IDF). After returning to Australia from his service in the IDF, he obtained a degree in International Relations. He later completed internships with a federal parliamentarian and with the Lowy Institute for International Policy in Sydney.

== Royal Commission into Institutional Responses to Child Sexual Abuse ==
=== Testimony ===
In the late 1980s Waks attended Melbourne's Yeshivah centre, run by the Chabad ultra-orthodox movement of Judaism. Starting at the age of eleven, he was sexually abused by two members of the staff at the centre. At the time, the only person he confided in was reportedly a classmate, who shared the information with other students. "It was an additional source of ridicule," Waks said. Waks reported sexual abuse by two different perpetrators to the Yeshivah leadership and to the police in 1996. When no action was taken, Waks went public in 2011 with allegations against the abusers, and pressure to keep quiet. Both perpetrators were convicted of sex crimes in 2013.

Waks gave evidence at the Royal Commission that he received abusive emails including one from an executive of the Sydney Yeshivah centre reading "Just because a security guard molested you, don't blame Yeshivah... Get over it. I haven’t met a person yet with one nice word to say about you. Most people consider you a low life." The Sydney Morning Herald wrote that Yeshivah rabbis "railed against the whistleblowing Waks" and claimed that Waks and his father had "a vendetta against the centre." In testimony before the Royal Commission a former manager and director both apologised to Waks and admitted that they should have prevented this.

=== Reaction ===
As part of their effort to eliminate child sexual abuse in the Jewish community, Manny Waks and his father, Zephaniah Waks testified before the Royal Commission into Institutional Responses to Child Sexual Abuse. As Zephaniah Waks shared evidence about the abuse of his sons, the president of the Organisation of Rabbis of Australasia, Rabbi Meir Shlomo Kluwgant, sent a text message to an editor of the Australian Jewish News accusing him of "destroying Chabad" and labelling him a "lunatic". Kluwgant was cross-examined about whether he watched testimony by Zephaniah, initially stating under oath that he hadn't watched much of the testimony because he was preparing to go to hospital, before conceding that he had sent the text message about the testimony. Kluwgant resigned the next week after child sexual abuse victims told him his position was "untenable."

Rabbi Moshe Gutnick was called to testify. He said, "I believe the cover-ups and bullying and intimidation that has gone on ... represents the antithesis of the teachings of Chabad and Judaism and orthodoxy." He acknowledged that the Orthodox Chabad community in Australia was guilty of covering up sex crimes committed in the community, and pressuring victims and their families not to report the crimes to the police. Gutnick said that people reporting abuse were ostracized mosers ("informers"). He said "a culture of cover-up, often couched in religious terms, pervaded our thinking and our actions." He said that rabbis in these situations had misused their power, and that anyone who insists a child sexual abuse victim should go first to a rabbi rather than the police is not doing so out of religious reasons but trying to "hush it up, to cover it up, to prevent the victim from finding redress. There is no doubt at all: Mesirah ['informing'] has no application whatsoever to instances of child sexual abuse. To use mesirah in this way is an abomination." Gutnick also lamented that there was no formal training for rabbis on how to handle reported abuse.

Manny Waks said, "Today, Rabbi Moshe Gutnick restored my faith in ultra-Orthodox Judaism. For the first time ever the reform that is so critical seems much closer. Thank you Rabbi Gutnick. Hopefully the rest of the Orthodox Rabbinate will now follow suit. What an incredible day for justice."

In 2015 Chabad's international leadership made overtures to Waks. Waks says he was invited to meet with Chabad's director of operations, Rabbi Mendy Sharfstein, to discuss best practices in responding to allegations of abuse.

== Activism against sexual abuse ==
Waks is an advocate against child sexual abuse within the Jewish community. In 2012 he founded Tzedek, an Australia-based organisation advocating for a Jewish community free of child sexual abuse, after having brought his own experience of Child sexual abuse in Australia within the Jewish community into the public arena in July 2011. In 2015, Chabad's international leadership made overtures to Waks. Waks says he was invited to meet with Chabad's director of operations, Rabbi Mendy Sharfstein, to discuss best practices in responding to allegations of abuse.

Waks was featured in a follow-up documentary Code of Silence, in which he had a face to face meeting with a man who was convicted of abusing a victim known as AVB.

In 2016 Waks spoke to the chair of the Knesset Special Committee for the Rights of the Child. In his comments he cautioned the committee: "Sex offenders tend to move from country to country to avoid jail, but what makes Israel unique is the Law of Return, which essentially grants unhindered access to anyone who is Jewish to come here without any real screening."

=== Tzedek ===
Manny Waks founded Tzedek, an organisation dedicated to fighting sexual abuse. The organisation has received $300,000 in funding from the Australian Federal Government.

=== Global campaign ===
Waks established a non-profit group, Kol v’Oz. Kol v'Oz is lobbying the Knesset for changes in the statute of limitations on sexual crimes. Waks serves as director of Kol v'Oz.

=== Lawsuits ===
Waks initiated civil proceedings against Yeshivah Centre in Melbourne, Australia. He has also sued his brother Avi Yemini following dishonest claims by Yemini that Waks and their father were harbouring a known paedophile in the family home. Yemini apologised some months later, & Waks ended the lawsuit.

== Personal life ==
Waks is the father of three children.

== See also ==
- Child sexual abuse
- Anti-pedophile activism
- Jewish Community Watch
