= Avi Yemini =

Australian far-right provocateur and commentator

- אבי ימיני
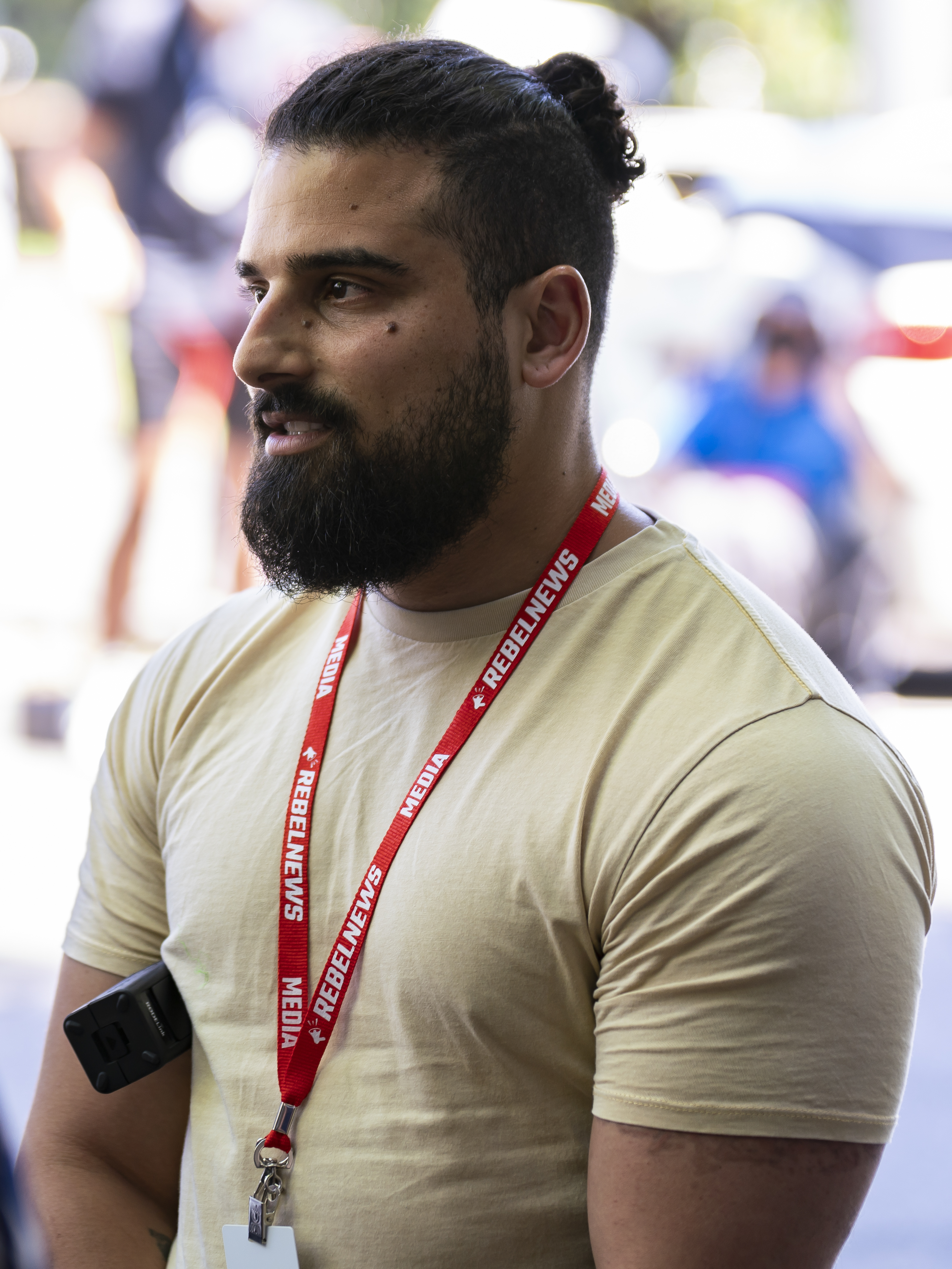
- Yemini in 2022
- Born: Avraham Shalom Waks; Melbourne, Victoria, Australia
- Citizenship: Australian; Israeli
- Education: Yeshivah College
- Occupations: Soldier; Activist
- Employer: Rebel News (since 2020)
- Political party: Australian Liberty Alliance (2018–2019)
- Military career
- Allegiance: Israel
- Branch: Israeli Ground Forces
- Service years: 2004–2007
- Unit: Golani Brigade
- Website: followavi.com

Avraham Shalom Yemini (né Waks; Hebrew: אברהם שלום ימיני) is an Australian-Israeli far-right provocateur and commentator. Since 2020 he has worked as the Australian correspondent for Rebel News, a Canadian far-right website. Yemini has been involved in numerous cases of litigation, initiated both by him and against him.

Yemini grew up in a large family in Melbourne, Victoria, and attended various Orthodox Jewish schools in Melbourne and overseas. When he was 16 he became addicted to heroin and at the age of 19 joined the Israel Defense Forces (IDF) in an attempt to get off drugs. He later opened up and ran two gyms in the Melbourne area, both of which were sold in 2018.

In 2018, Yemini unsuccessfully ran as a candidate for the Australian Liberty Alliance in the Victorian state election.

== Early life and education ==
Yemini was born in Melbourne, Victoria, to Zephaniah (formerly Stephen) and Hava Waks, and grew up in the Melbourne suburb of St Kilda East. He is one of seventeen children who were raised in an ultra-Orthodox Chabad family. Yemini is a younger brother of Manny Waks.

Yemini attended Yeshivah College, and was later sent to ultra-Orthodox schools in the U.S., Israel and Brazil. He returned to Melbourne when he was 16, and subsequently became addicted to heroin. He spent the next two years in rehab, foster homes and crisis care.

== Career ==
Yemini joined the IDF when he was 19, in an effort to address his drug addiction. He served with the IDF's Golani Brigade from 2005 until 2008. Most of his active duty was spent along the border of the Gaza Strip. After returning to Australia, Yemini opened IDF Training, a gym in Caulfield, Victoria. The gym, known for training Krav Maga, was at the time described as largest training centre for the martial art in Australia. In 2016 he opened a second gym in the Melbourne central business district. In 2018, Yemini sold the gyms.

In 2015, Yemini started his own Facebook page which he used to start building a profile by creating controversy. In 2017 he worked as a content creator for the Australian Liberty Alliance. Yemini later ran as a candidate for the Australian Liberty Alliance in the Southern Metropolitan Region of the Victorian Legislative Council at the 2018 state election. He was unsuccessful, receiving 0.49% of the vote. By 2019, Yemini was a staple in Australian far-right media, being a regular guest on The Bolt Report and Mark Latham's Outsiders.

In 2020, Yemini became the Australian correspondent for the Canadian far-right outlet, Rebel News. He is known for his performance skills and opportunistic nature. Through his work with Rebel, Yemini emerged as a critic of former Victorian Premier Daniel Andrews and his government's response to the COVID-19 pandemic.

In 2026, Yemini tried to form a party called Free Palestine party for the 2026 Victorian state election, in a bid to attract votes from left-wing voters and redirect preferences of votes the party receives to right-wing parties. The electoral commission responded by confirming it had no authority to prevent parties from adopting misleading names, and in June the commission began the process of registering "Free Palestine" as a political party. In July 2026 The Age reported that the Allan government was set to introduce legislation by the end of the month to abolish group voting tickets.

=== Social media bans ===
In April 2016, the Facebook page for Yemini's IDF Training gym was banned for three days for sharing an antisemitic post with the hashtag "saynotoracism". Yemini said he had shared the post to raise awareness of the intolerance faced by the Jewish community.

In August 2018, Yemini's main Facebook page was banned for hate speech violations. The decision came after Yemini doxxed journalist Osman Faruqi, resulting in Faruqi receiving abusive messages and death threats from Yemini's followers.

In September 2020, two of Yemini's Facebook pages were banned following inquiries by Gizmodo Australia. As of February 2021, Yemini was posting anti-vaccine and anti-lockdown content on Facebook.

== Legal issues ==
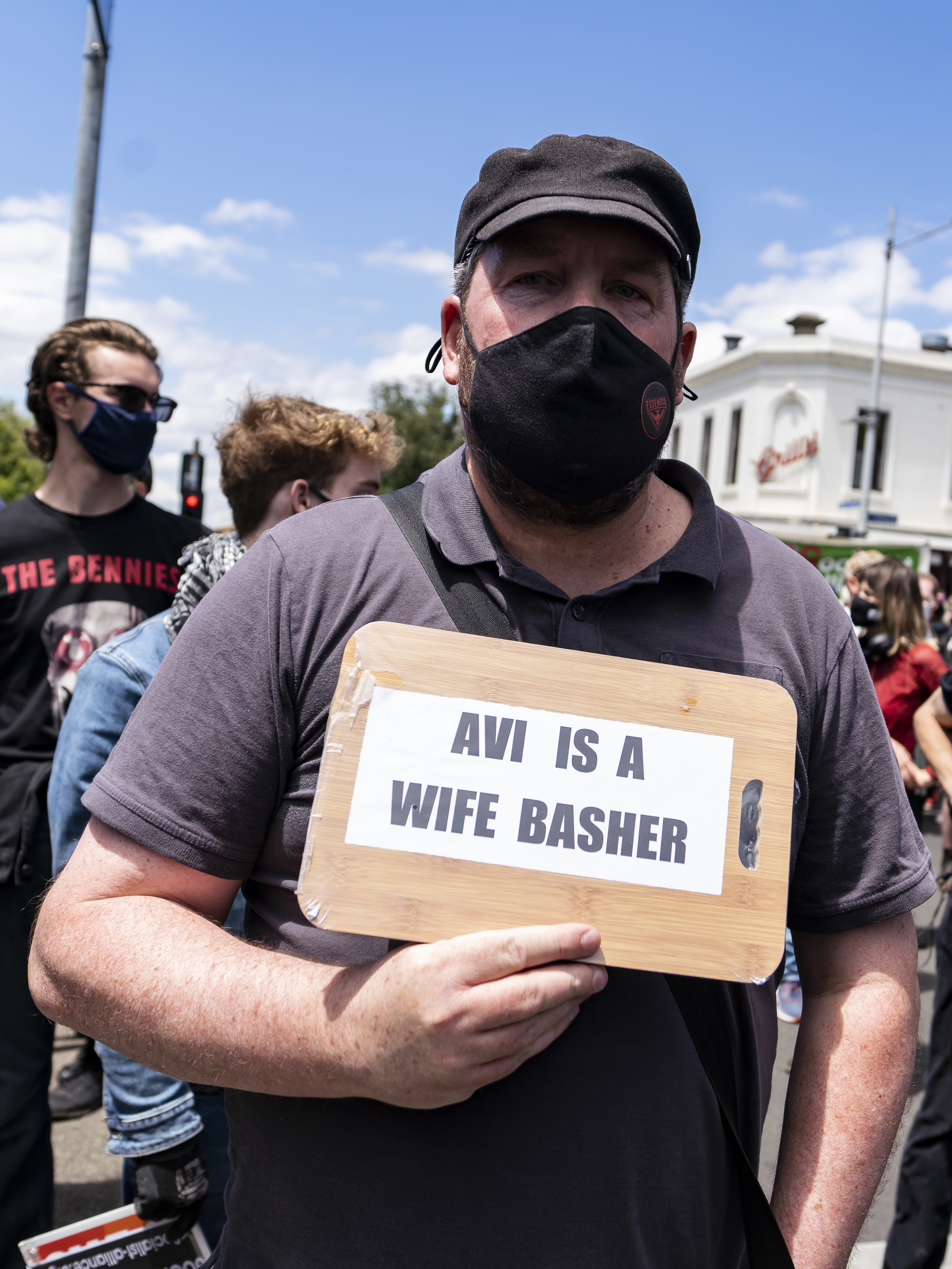
A protestor at an anti far-right rally, holding a chopping board with a sign on it which makes reference to Avi Yemini's guilty plea for assault after he threw a chopping board which hit his former wife in the head

In 2016, one of Yemini's brothers, Manny Waks, sued him for defamation after Yemini claimed that Waks and their father were harbouring a known paedophile in the family home. Waks dropped the lawsuit after Yemini apologised a few months later.

In July 2019, Yemini pleaded guilty to assault after he threw a chopping board that hit his former wife on her forehead in 2016. He also pleaded guilty to using a carriage service to harass by sending abusive text messages to her, and one charge of breaching an intervention order relating to a video of a man. Yemini was fined $3,600.

In September 2020, Yemini initiated legal action against Victoria Police, for wrongful arrest and alleged assault during lockdown protests. In June 2022 Victoria Police issued an apology acknowledging that Yemini had been wrongly arrested on multiple occasions while reporting for Rebel News.

In 2021 Yemini was ejected and banned from the Victorian Parliament precinct for 7 days after he gained access using a media pass issued by the federal Department of Home Affairs for foreign dignitary visits. In March 2021, he applied for accreditation to allow him access to the press galleries of both houses of the parliament and the areas surrounding the buildings. Yemini's application was refused with no reasons being given. He then took legal action against three Victorian parliamentary officials − including former Legislative Assembly speaker Colin Brooks. Yemini subsequently lost the case.

In June 2021, Zarah Garde-Wilson initiated a defamation lawsuit against Yemini after he published an image of Garde-Wilson with wording which stated that she had been arrested and charged for making death threats. The case was settled in October 2021. Rebel News agreed to remove the offending image of Garde-Wilson and issue an apology stating that no one had made any death threats.

In March 2022, Yemini launched legal action against Twitter user PRGuy17 claiming that tweets from the account were defamatory. In June of that year, Twitter was ordered to hand over IP addresses associated with the account. After Twitter handed over IP addresses associated with the account, YouTuber Friendlyjordies interviewed Jeremy Maluta who stated that the account belonged to them.

In August 2022, Yemini was denied entry to New Zealand due to a 2019 criminal conviction for assaulting his ex-wife. Yemini claimed the decision was due to an article in The New Zealand Herald that described him and fellow content creator Rukshan Fernando as "Australian conspiracy commentators". Yemini was allowed entry to New Zealand in 2023.

In 2023, Yemini sued Facebook fact-checker RMIT FactLab after it debunked claims made by him in a story about the Shrine of Remembrance's CEO. He claimed that the fact-checker had defamed him by accusing him of spreading misinformation. During the court case, RMIT FactLab stated that Yemini had "failed to make any formal inquiries via appropriate channels with relevant persons" who had knowledge of the claims made in his story. The case was dismissed in August 2023 when Yemini withdrew. He stated that "[w]e had to withdraw due to the risk of losing the case and having to pay costs on top".

== Views ==
Yemini is a far-right provocateur, who has been described by The Sydney Morning Herald as having a pronounced dislike of trans-rights activists and climate science. He is critical of what he sees as a middle-class, soft-left ideology, which he believes is supported by "woke elites", an entitled political class, and the mainstream media. The politics of Avi Yemini's Australian branch of Rebel News have been described as "anti-leftist".

Although Yemini grew up in an ultra-Orthodox family, he describes himself as not being Orthodox. He only wears a kippah when attending synagogue or being interviewed by the media. Yemini has described himself as a "proud Zionist" and as being "proudly anti-Islam". He has described Islam as a "barbaric ideology", and Muslim countries as "Islamic shitholes". At a 2018 demonstration against the imprisonment of Tommy Robinson, Yemini declared himself to be "the world's proudest Jewish Nazi", later saying that it was an "obvious joke". Through the Australian Liberty Alliance, his collaboration with Robinson and Rebel News, he has been affiliated with the counter-jihad movement.

In April 2025, fact-checking organization FakeReporter reported that Yemini was one of 30 prominent Twitter accounts promoting content from Gazawood, an Israeli Twitter account which attempts to discredit Palestinians by claiming they are exaggerating or faking their casualties.

== Personal life ==
Yemini lives in Berwick, Victoria, with his wife, a hairdresser. They met at a coffee shop in 2018.
