= Code of Silence (2014 film) =

2014 Australian documentary film

Code of Silence is a 2014 Australian documentary film of the life of Manny Waks and his Chabad Hasidic family who struggle in the aftermath of Waks' public disclosure of the sexual abuse he endured during his school years. The documentary was directed by filmmaker Danny Ben-Moshe and aired on the ABC Australian television channel.

== See also ==
- Welcome to the Waks Family
- One of Us (2017 film)
