= Crimes Act =

Stock short title used for legislation

Crimes Act (with its variations) is a stock short title used for legislation in Australia, New Zealand and the United States, relating to the criminal law (including both substantive and procedural aspects of that law). It tends to be used for Acts which consolidate or codify the whole of the criminal law.

The Bill for an Act with this short title may have been known as a Crimes Bill during its passage through Parliament.

The Crimes Acts may be a generic name either for legislation bearing that short title or for all legislation which relates to the criminal law. It is a term of art in Victoria.

== List ==
=== Australia ===
==== Commonwealth of Australia ====
The Crimes Act 1914 (No.12)
The Crimes Act 1915 (No.6)
The Crimes Act 1926 (No.9)
The Crimes Act 1928 (No.13)
The Crimes Act 1932 (No.30)
The Crimes Act 1941 (No.6)
The Crimes Act 1955 (No.10)
The Crimes Act 1959 (No.11)
The Crimes Act 1960 (No.84)
The Crimes Act 1973 (No.33)
The Crimes Amendment Act 1982 (No.67)
The Crimes Legislation Amendment Act 1987 (No.120)
The Crimes Legislation Amendment Act 1989 (No.108)
The Crimes Legislation Amendment Act (No.2) 1989 (No.4, 1990)
The Crimes Legislation Amendment Act 1991 (No.28)
The Crimes (Investigation of Commonwealth Offences) Amendment Act 1991 (No.59)
The Crimes Legislation Amendment Act (No. 2) 1991 (No.123)
The Crimes Amendment Act 1991 (No.140)
The Crimes Legislation Amendment Act 1992 (No.164)
The Crimes (Search Warrants and Powers of Arrest) Amendment Act 1994 (No.65)
The Crimes (Child Sex Tourism) Amendment Act 1994 (No.105)
The Crimes and Other Legislation Amendment Act 1994 (No.182)
The Crimes Amendment Act 1995 (No.11)
The Crimes Amendment (Controlled Operations) Act 1996 (No.28)
The Crimes and Other Legislation Amendment Act 1997 (No.20)
The Crimes Amendment (Enforcement of Fines) Act 1998 (No.49)
The Crimes Amendment (Forensic Procedures) Act 1998 (No.96)
The Crimes Amendment (Forensic Procedures) Act 2001 (No.22)
The Crimes Amendment (Age Determination) Act 2001 (No.37)
The Crimes Amendment Act 2002 (No.88)
The Crimes Legislation Amendment (People Smuggling, Firearms Trafficking and Other Measures) Act 2002 (No.141)
The Crimes Legislation Enhancement Act 2003 (No.41)
The Crimes Legislation Amendment (Telecommunications Offences and Other Measures) Act (No. 2) 2004 (No.127)
The Crimes Amendment Act 2005 (No.87)
The Crimes Act Amendment (Forensic Procedures) Act (No. 1) 2006 (No.130)
The Crimes Amendment (Bail and Sentencing) Act 2006 (No.171)
The Crimes Legislation Amendment (Miscellaneous Matters) Act 2008 (No.70)

==== Australian Capital Territory ====
The Crimes Act 1900 (currently links to the NSW Act)

==== New South Wales ====
The Crimes Act 1900
The Crimes (Amendment) Act 1955 (No. 16)
The Crimes (Amendment) Act 1967 (No. 77)
The Crimes (Amendment) Act 1979 (No. 95)

==== Victoria ====
The Crimes Act 1890 (54 Vict. No. 1079)
The Crimes Act 1891 (55 Vict. No. 1231)
The Crimes Act 1890 Amendment Act 1896 (60 Vict No 1478)
The Crimes Act 1900 (63 Vict. No. 1643)
The Crimes Act 1910 (1 Geo. V No. 2306)
The Crimes Act 1914 (4 Geo. V No. 2505)
The Crimes Act 1915 (6 Geo. V No. 2637)
The Crimes Act 1915 (No. 2) (6 Geo. V No. 2789)
The Crimes (Acts of Indecency) Act 1919 (10 Geo. V No. 3025)
The Crimes Act 1928 (19 Geo. V No. 3664)
The Crimes (Indeterminate Sentences) Act 1946 (10 Geo. VI No. 5131)
The Crimes Act 1949 (No. 5379)
The Crimes (Reformatory Prisons) Act 1951 (No. 5531)
The Crimes Act 1954 (No. 5783)
The Crimes (Amendment) Act 1955 (No. 5917)
The Crimes Act 1957 (No. 6103)
The Crimes (Amendment) Act 1957 (No. 6166)
The Crimes (Parole Board) Act 1957 (No. 6167)
The Crimes Act 1958 (No. 6231)
The Crimes (Amendment) Act 1964 (No. 7184)
The Crimes Act 1967 (No. 7546)
The Crimes (Amendment) Act 1967 (No. 7577)
The Crimes (Amendment) Act 1968 (No. 7696)
The Crimes (Amendment) Act 1970 (No. 7994)
The Crimes (Amendment) Act 1972 (No. 8280)
The Crimes Act 1972 (No. 8338)
The Crimes (Amendment) Act 1973 (No. 8410)
The Crimes Act 1976 (No. 8870)
The Crimes (Amendment) Act 1978 (No. 9242)
The Crimes (Amendment) Act 1979 (No. 9323)

The Crimes Acts consisted of the principal Act, and the Acts amending that Act, and Acts which stated that they were one of the Crimes Acts. These Acts could be cited together as "the Crimes Acts". The first principal Act was the Crimes Act 1890, followed by the Crimes Act 1915, then the Crimes Act 1928, which was followed by Crimes Act 1957.

From 1891 to 1915, The Crimes Acts was the collective title of the Crimes Act 1890, and the Acts amending the same, and the Crimes Act 1891, the Crimes Act 1900 and the Crimes Act 1914.

From 1915 to 1928, The Crimes Acts was the collective title of the Crimes Act 1915, and the Acts amending the same, and the Crimes Act 1915 (No. 2) and the Crimes (Acts of Indecency) Act 1919.

From 1946 to 1957, The Crimes Acts was the collective title of the Crimes Act 1928, and the Acts amending the same, and the Crimes (Indeterminate Sentences) Act 1946, the Crimes Act 1949, the Crimes (Reformatory Prisons) Act 1951 the Crimes Act 1954, and the Crimes (Amendment) Act 1955

From 1957 to 1958, The Crimes Acts was the collective title of the Crimes Act 1957, the Crimes (Amendment) Act 1957 and the Crimes (Parole Board) Act 1957.

=== Hong Kong ===
The Crimes Ordinance 1971

=== New Zealand ===
The Crimes Act 1908 (1908 No. 32) was a consolidation of the Criminal Code Act 1893 (57 Vict. 1893 No. 56), and related criminal law and procedure that had been enacted between 1867 and 1906.
Crimes Act 1961 (1961 No. 43)

=== United Kingdom ===
==== Ireland ====
Criminal Law and Procedure (Ireland) Act 1887 (50 & 51 Vict. c. 20) was informally known as the Crimes Act.

=== United States ===
- Crimes Act of 1790
- Crimes Act of 1825
- The Major Crimes Act (1885) (codified at 18 U.S.C. § 1153)

== See also ==
- Criminal Code
