= Welcome to the Waks Family =

Documentary film

- Directed by: Barbara Chobocky
- Written by: Jeff Bruer; Barbara Chobocky
- Produced by: Barbara Chobocky; Rod Freedman
- Starring: Manny Waks; Avi Yemini
- Narrated by: Barbara Chobocky
- Cinematography: Jeff Bruer; Rocco Fasano; Nicholas Sherman
- Release date: 2003
- Running time: 52 minutes
- Country: Australia
- Language: English

Welcome to the Waks Family is a 2003 Australian documentary film exploring the life of a Chabad Hasidic family in Melbourne. The film follows the life of Zephaniah and Haya Waks and their 17 children, including Manny and Avi. Zephaniah was born Stephen Waks and lived as a secular Jew in Sydney, Australia, before joining the Chabad Hasidic community. The documentary was directed by filmmaker Barbara Chobocky who was a friend of Zephaniah while they both studied at university. The film was screened on the SBS television channel.

== See also ==
- Chabad in film and television
