= Criminal Law and Procedure (Ireland) Act 1887 =

Act of the Parliament of the United Kingdom

Criminal Law and Procedure (Ireland) Act 1887 (Note: Section 20.)
- Act of Parliament
- Parliament of the United Kingdom
- Long title: An Act to make better provision for the prevention and punishment of Crime in Ireland, and for other purposes relating thereto.
- Citation: 50 & 51 Vict. c. 20
- Territorial extent: Ireland (Note: Long title.)

Dates
- Royal assent: 19 July 1887
- Commencement: 19 July 1887 (Note: The Acts of Parliament (Commencement) Act 1793.)
- Repealed: 21 August 1975
Other legislation
Amended by	Northern Ireland (Emergency Provisions) Act 1973
Repealed by	Northern Ireland (Emergency Provisions) (Amendment) Act 1975

Status: Repealed

Text of statute as originally enacted

The Criminal Law and Procedure (Ireland) Act 1887 (50 & 51 Vict. c. 20) was an act of the Parliament of the United Kingdom which amended the criminal law in Ireland to give greater law enforcement power to the authorities. It was introduced by Arthur Balfour, then Chief Secretary for Ireland, to deal with the Plan of Campaign, an increase in illegal activity associated with the Land War. It was informally called the Crimes Act, Irish Crimes Act, or Perpetual Crimes Act; (the last because it was permanent, unlike earlier Crimes Acts passed as emergency measures with limited duration) or the Jubilee Coercion Act (being passed in the year of the Golden Jubilee of Queen Victoria).

== Implementation ==
The act empowered the Lord Lieutenant of Ireland by proclamation to name a district within which the act would have force. The other provisions applied only with such "proclaimed areas".

The act allowed actions connected to agrarian violence to be tried as summary offences by a magistrate without a jury. The "Mitchelstown Massacre" occurred on 9 September 1887, when Royal Irish Constabulary (RIC) members fired at a crowd protesting against the conviction under the act of two men, including MP William O'Brien. Three were killed; when Balfour defended the RIC in the Commons, O'Brien dubbed him "Bloody Balfour". On 6 May 1920, as the Irish War of Independence was escalating, it was reported to the Commons that "Between 1st November, 1918, and 30th April, 1920, 305 cases were dealt with under the Criminal Law and Procedure (Ireland) Act. 1,109 persons were prosecuted in these cases, 454 were convicted, 109 were discharged, 352 were ordered to find bail, 194 are awaiting trial."

The act empowered the Lord Lieutenant to proclaim associations to be "dangerous" and to prohibit them. Under this power, the Irish National League was banned on 19 August 1887; likewise the First Dáil on 10 September 1919; Sinn Féin, the Irish Volunteers, Cumann na mBan, and the Gaelic League were proclaimed dangerous on 3 July 1918, and banned in various counties between June and October 1919.

== Repeal ==
Bills to repeal the act were introduced regularly by Irish nationalist MPs. In 1907, Michael Hogan proposed a motion in the Commons that, "in the opinion of this House, the presence of the Criminal Law and Procedure (Ireland) Act on the Statute Book is a gross violation of the Constitution, without parallel in any other portion of His Majesty's dominions, and that the Act should be immediately repealed." It was supported on behalf of the government by Augustine Birrell, the newly appointed Chief Secretary for Ireland, and passed by 252 votes to 83. A 1908 repeal bill passed second reading and committee stage in the Commons.

The act was repealed in the Republic of Ireland by the Statute Law Revision Act 1983.

In the United Kingdom (as regards Northern Ireland) the act was partially repealed by the Northern Ireland (Emergency Provisions) Act 1973.

== Bibliography ==
- Ewing, Keith D.; Gearty, C. A. (2001). "Civil Liberties: the Irish Dimension". The Struggle for Civil Liberties: Political Freedom and the Rule of Law in Britain, 1914–1945. Oxford University Press. pp. 331–391. ISBN 9780198762515.
