= Criminal law of Australia =

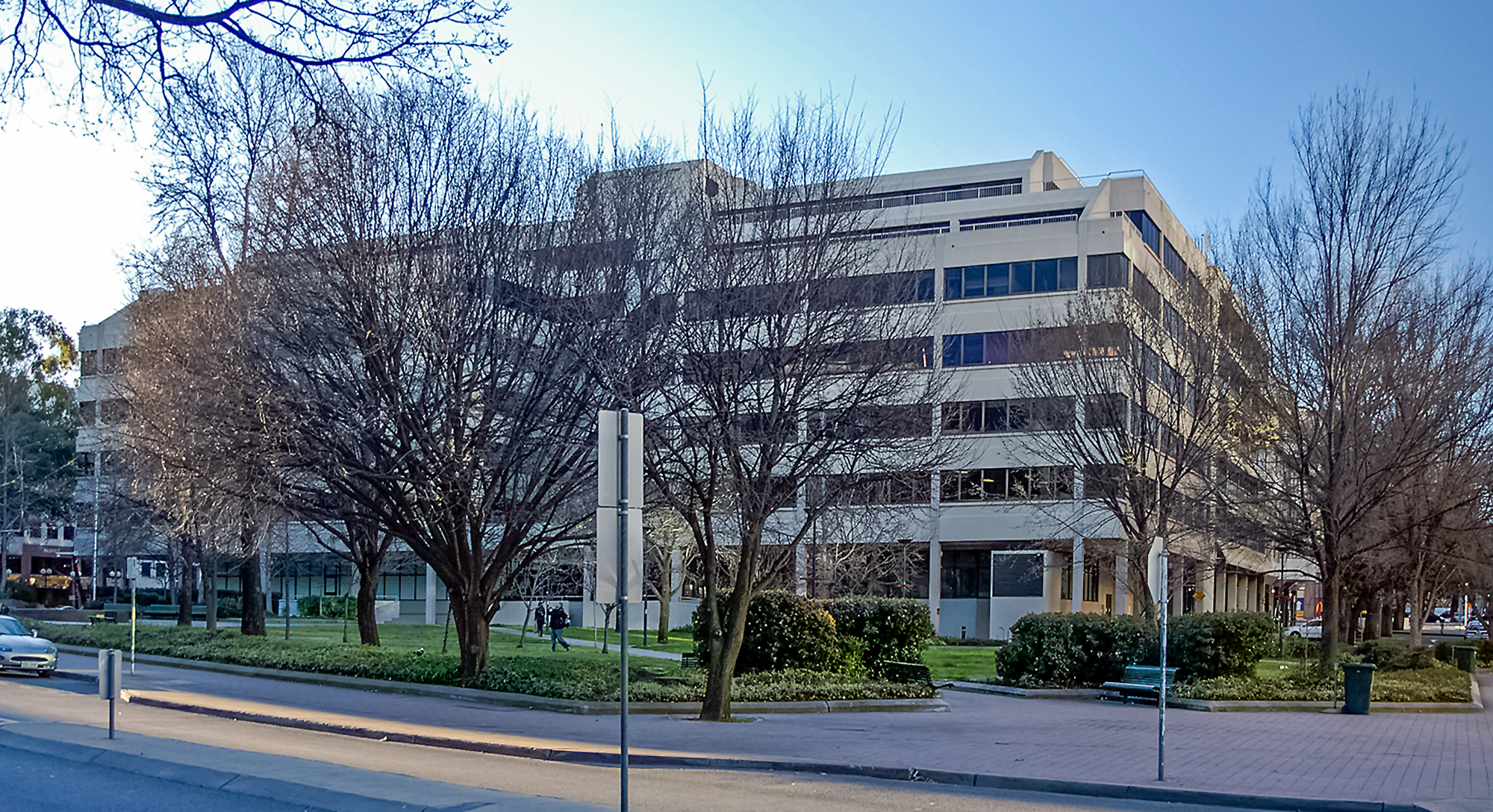
Australian Federal Police Headquarters in Canberra City, Australian Capital Territory. The AFP are primarily responsible for enforcing federal criminal law.

The criminal law of Australia is the body of law in Australia that relates to crime.

Responsibility for criminal law in Australia is divided between the state and territory parliaments and the Commonwealth Parliament. This division is due to the Commonwealth Parliament's limited legislative powers under Australian constitutional law. (Note: While Australian state governments have plenary power to enact legislation, the Commonwealth's legislative powers are exhaustively defined within the Australian Constitution.)

The criminal law system differs across Australian states, with distinctions readily found across jurisdictions regarding criminal offences, sentencing and criminal procedure.

Additionally, there exists a distinction between Australia's "code states" and "common law states". The code states of Western Australia, Queensland and Tasmania have wholly replaced the system of judge-made criminal law inherited from England with legislative instruments that exhaustively define the criminal law within those states. Other Australian states have retained the criminal law as inherited through the common law, albeit modulated through legislation and subsequent common law development by Australia's courts.

== Common law versus code jurisdictions ==
The Australian legal system inherits from that of the United Kingdom, due to Australia's colonisation by the British Empire. For this reason, much of Australia's criminal law was originally received from English common law.

In some Australian states, the common law criminal system is still in force, albeit modulated by legislation and subsequent development by Australian courts. In others, the criminal law has been wholly codified. These two types of criminal law systems are generally referred to as 'code jurisdictions' or 'common law jurisdictions' respectively. The common law jurisdictions of Australia are New South Wales, South Australia and Victoria; the code jurisdictions are the Australian Capital Territory, the Northern Territory, Queensland, Tasmania and Western Australia.

In common law jurisdictions, legislation does not always exhaustively define the elements of an offence. For example, section 117 of the Crimes Act 1900 (NSW) states that larceny is an indictable offence punishable for five years, but it does not define the meaning of larceny. (Note: The section reads: 117. Punishment for larceny; Whosoever commits larceny, or any indictable offence by this Act made punishable like larceny, shall, except in the cases hereinafter otherwise provided for, be liable to imprisonment for five years.) The offence of larceny remains defined in NSW by the common law.

== Jurisdictions ==
=== Commonwealth ===
The Commonwealth's jurisdiction in criminal matters is more limited than Australia's states. This is due to Australia's constitutional arrangements in which the Commonwealth has been granted only a limited and exhaustive list of subjects upon which it can validly enact legislation. Some analogies may be drawn with the constitutional arrangements of the United States.

Commonwealth offences are mostly found within either the Crimes Act 1914, or within the Criminal Code Act 1995. The 1995 act was enacted after a review of Commonwealth criminal law undertaken by Sir Harry Gibbs in 1987, which recommended that Commonwealth criminal law be consolidated. That committee also drafted a model criminal code for adoption within all Australian jurisdictions; however, that code was only adopted in part by the ACT and Northern Territory legislatures.

The Commonwealth has occasionally used its powers to override state criminal laws. For instance, the Human Rights (Sexual Conduct) Act 1994 overrode sodomy laws in Tasmania. (Note: The Human Rights (Sexual Conduct) Act was validly enacted through reliance upon the s51 external affairs power)

The Criminal Code Act 1995 has been amended many times, including for purposes of national security and counter-terrorism.

In February 2026, federal hate crime legislation, the Combatting Antisemitism, Hate and Extremism (Criminal and Migration Laws) Act 2026 was implemented within Australia, with explicit "mandatory sentencing of up to 7 years imprisonment".

=== New South Wales ===
The primary criminal statutes of NSW is the Crimes Act 1900 (NSW). Other statutes, such as the Summary Offences Act 1988 (NSW), also create criminal offences which are generally dealt with in the Local Court system.

Offences spelt out in the Drug Misuse and Trafficking Act 1985 (NSW) cover all prohibited drugs.

Among other important legislation is the Bail Act 2013 (NSW), Uniform Evidence Act 1995 (NSW) and the Customs Act 1901 (Cth).

Prosecution of criminal offences is subject to the Law Enforcement (Powers and Responsibilities) Act 2002 (NSW), which sets out the limits of police powers.

Special circumstances regarding child offenders is provided for under the Young Offender Act 1997 (NSW).

In February 2026, the NSW Government has become the first state in Australia to ban the use of "good character" in an effort to have rapists and paedophiles jail sentences reduced. NSW Attorney General Michael Daley stated that offenders should not be allowed to use their "good character" as a means to lessen the impact of their criminal actions.

=== Victoria ===
The primary criminal statute in Victoria is the Crimes Act 1958. Criminal procedure is consolidated within the Criminal Procedure Act 2009 (Vic).

Other important legislation includes the Evidence Act 2008 (Vic), Summary Offences Act 1966 (Vic) and Jury Directions Act 2015 (Vic).

=== South Australia ===
Most crimes in South Australia are codified in the Criminal Law Consolidation Act 1935 (SA).

There are also a number of common law provisions for criminal conduct in South Australia.

=== Queensland ===
The Criminal Code Act 1899 (Qld), is the primary instrument for the source of criminal law in Queensland.

The act is sometimes referred to as the 'Griffith Code', named for Sir Samuel Griffith, who was responsible for its production. In drafting the code, Griffith borrowed heavily from Italy's Zanardelli Code, which Griffith described as 'the most complete and perfect Penal Code in existence'. Griffith also took inspiration from the New York Penal Code. The Griffith Code was later adopted by other jurisdictions, including Western Australia, Nigeria and Papua New Guinea.

The book Carter's Criminal Law of Queensland is a collection of annotated information on case law associated with the Queensland criminal code; it is popular among legal scholars and practitioners.

=== Western Australia ===
The Criminal Code (WA) is a complete codification of Western Australia's criminal law. The code is substantially similar to Queensland's criminal code and was constructed with close reference to the Griffith code.

Section 4 in appendix B of the Criminal Code Act Compilation Act 1913 (WA) provides that:

No person shall be liable to be tried or punished in Western Australia as for an offence, except under the express provisions of the Code, or some other statute law of Western Australia, or under the express provisions of some statute of the Commonwealth of Australia ...

The effect of this provision is that no person can be tried for offences that are not explicitly provided for in legislation, abolishing offences at common law. Notably, the common law offence of contempt of court has been preserved by section 7 of the act in the same Appendix B, allowing courts of criminal jurisdiction to summarily try someone for this single common law offence. The Criminal Code Compilation Act 1913 (WA) itself is the compiling act of the Parliament of Western Australia but does not contain any criminal offences. The criminal offences are provided for in schedule of the act, and citing criminal offences in the schedule is simply to the Criminal Code (WA). There are many other acts in WA which contain criminal offences, including (but not limited to) the Misuse of Drugs Act 1981 (WA), the Firearms Act 1973 (WA), the Road Traffic Act 1974 (WA), the Local Government Act 1995 (WA) and the Bushfires Act 1954 (WA).

=== Tasmania ===
Tasmania's serious criminal offences are set out in the Criminal Code Act 1924 (Tas).

There are numerous other laws where provisions outlining offences may be found. E.g. the Firearms Act, the Police Offences Act, or Road Safety (Alcohol and Drugs) Act.

=== Northern Territory ===
The primary criminal statute of the Northern Territory is the Criminal Code Act 1983 (NT). The Northern Territory has also exhaustively codified its criminal laws in a manner similar to Queensland and Western Australia.

The Criminal Code Act 1983, was drafted with close reference to both the Queensland and WA Criminal Codes.

=== Australian Capital Territory ===
Offences and defences are mostly codified by the Crimes Act 1900, and the Criminal Code Act 2002.

== One transaction rule ==
In Australian law, the "one transaction rule" or "single transaction principle" is that when two or more offences are committed in the course of a single act, all sentences should be concurrent rather than consecutive.

Despite its imprecise nature, the one transaction rule is a long-standing sentencing principle recognised in Australia as a 'good working rule': Ruane v The Queen (1979) 1 A Crim R 284, 286, cited in R v White [2002] WASCA 112, [15]; see also Dickens v The Queen [2004] WASCA 179.

== Model criminal code ==
It has been proposed that Australian jurisdictions should make criminal laws consistent through adoption of a model criminal code. At present, New South Wales, Western Australia and the Northern Territory have participated in modifying some crimes to match the position in the model criminal code, but in many areas, states have not changed laws to reflect this code and in some instances rejected the code entirely.
