= PRGuy17 =

Australian political commentator

Jeremy Maluta
- Born: Jeremy Tristan Hewitt Maluta; 1986 or 1987 (age 38–39)
- Other names: PRGuy, PRGuy17
- Known for: Political commentary
- Website: https://twitter.com/PRGuy17

PRGuy17 is the Twitter username of Australian political & media commentator Jeremy Maluta.

== Twitter account ==
In March 2020 Maluta set up the anonymous Twitter account @PRGuy17. This was at the start of the COVID-19 pandemic.

=== Commentary style ===
The account gained popularity for his commentary on Victorian politics and local news media regarding the Daniel Andrews’ government and COVID-19 pandemic. The writing style used by the account intentionally matched what Maluta viewed as the sensationalist, hyperbolic and narrative driven headlines from the right-wing tabloid media in Victoria such as The Age, Herald Sun and The Australian.

His support for the left wing Andrews Government resulted in accusations of the anonymous account being run by a paid political commentator or being run directly by Labor Party staff. This would likely have breached electoral laws regarding donations and political media authorisations. Maluta has consistently denied the accusation and no evidence exists to support this conspiracy theory. He was also accused of working as a Victorian Government public servant. After Maluta revealed his identity, he also confirmed that he works in an industry unconnected with politics, public service or the media.

The account regularly commented during the 2022 Victorian state election, supporting the Andrews policy of bringing back the State Electricity Commission of Victoria, commented on the illegal "Ditch Dan" ambulance revealed by Liberal opposition leader Matthew Guy, referred to Guy and his "lobster with a mobster" controversy and Guy's referral to Independent Broad-based Anti-corruption Commission, Victoria Police and the Australian Federal Police over a potential conspiracy to engage in corrupt behaviour by seeking payments from a Liberal donor that would have bypassed reporting under electoral donation laws. Labor was re-elected in another landslide. He later commentated on issues such as the controversial Macquarie Point Stadium in Tasmania and regarding Federal politics during the 2022 Australian federal election.

== Legal issues ==
In March 2022 legal proceedings were launched in the Federal Court of Australia against Twitter arguing that tweets published by the account were of a defamatory nature. The lawsuit was a legal pretext designed to uncover the identity of the anonymous owner of the account. Justice Debra Mortimer later ordered Twitter to hand over information related to the identification of the account owner within 14 days. In June 2022, Maluta revealed his ownership of the Twitter account @PRGuy17 on a YouTube video with friendlyjordies, another Australian political commentator.
