= Rukshan Fernando =

Australian videographer and photographer (born June 1985)

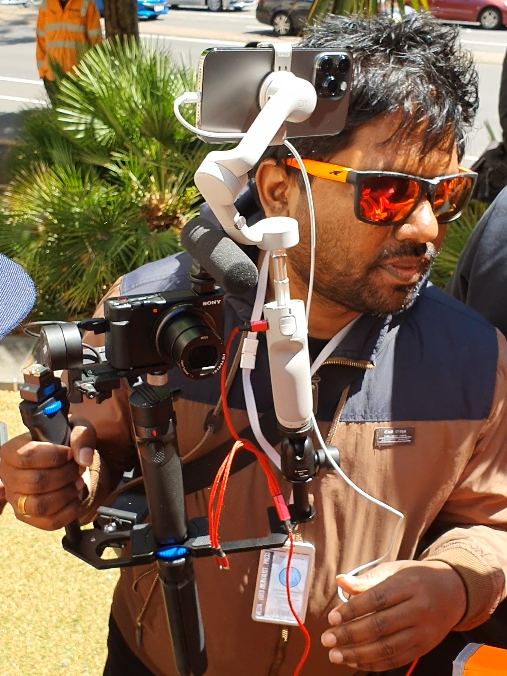
- Fernando at a protest in 2021
- Born: 1984 or 1985 (age 40–41)
- Education: Victoria University
- Occupations: Videographer and photographer

Rukshan Fernando (born 1984 or 1985), also known as Real Rukshan, is a Sri Lankan-Australian videographer and wedding photographer known for his favourable coverage of the anti-vaccine and anti-lockdown movement in Australia.

== Personal life and education ==
Fernando was born to a Sri Lankan migrant couple. He went to school at Dandenong, Victoria and studied law at Victoria University. Fernando lives in Melbourne's south-east.

== Career ==
Fernando co-founded Ferndara, a wedding photography business based in Melbourne. As of 2014, Fernando and his team have travelled to Sri Lanka to film weddings.

In 2020, Fernando became known for creating memes mocking Premier Dan Andrews. He provided live coverage of the anti-lockdown protests in Melbourne; he said that he did not endorse the views of the protestors. He has been viewed as a hero by supporters of Melbourne's anti-vaccine and anti-lockdown protests.

In 2022, Fernando travelled to New Zealand with far-right activist Avi Yemini. Yemini was refused entry to New Zealand on character grounds. However, Fernando was allowed into New Zealand, and filmed a glowing tribute to an anti-government rally led by COVID-19 conspiracy theorist Chantelle Baker.

== Views ==
Fernando supports U.S. president Donald Trump and his false claim that the 2020 U.S. election was stolen. He is a fan of American right-wing conspiracy theorists Mike Cernovich, Jack Posobiec and Andy Ngo. Fernando is a climate change denier. In 2019, he promoted a conspiracy theory that U.S. politician Ilhan Omar had married her brother.

Fernando supported Dan Andrews when the first COVID-19 lockdown began in March 2020. Later that year, he said in an interview with Fox News personality Laura Ingraham that Victoria was becoming like "Communist China". The Daily Telegraph and the Herald Sun listed Fernando among the top 100 superspreaders of misinformation.
