= Darkan v The Queen =

Judgement of the High Court of Australia

Darkan v R
- Court: High Court of Australia
- Full case name: HOWARD RODNEY DARKAN APPELLANT AND THE QUEEN RESPONDENT
- Decided: 26 September 2007
- Citation: (2006) HCA 34

Case history
- Prior action: none
- Subsequent action: none

Court membership
- Judges sitting: Gleeson CJ, Gummow, Kirby, Heydon and Crennan JJ

Case opinions
- (4:1) Jury misdirected as to meaning of "probable consequence", but proviso applies

Darkan v R (2006) HCA 34 is a High Court of Australia case concerning the meaning of "probable consequence" as used in ss8 and 9 of the Criminal Code of Queensland.

The three appellants were tried and convicted of the murder of Kalman John Toth, the second appellant's de facto husband. A dispute arose between the second appellant and the deceased. The second appellant recruited three men to do him harm: the other two appellants and Bowen, who appeared as a witness for the prosecution.

The three men assaulted the deceased in a park in Mareeba, injuring him so severely as to cause his death. The prosecution case was put in three ways, one of which was that the offence was committed in the prosecution of a common purpose per s8 of the Code.

== Decision ==
The appeal concerned the instructions given to the jury about the meaning of "probable consequence" as used in s8 of the Code. The trial judge's summing up followed R v Hind and Harwood in directing the jury that "probable consequence" was satisfied if there was a real or substantial possibility or chance.

The High Court rejected this reasoning, instead holding that "The expression "a probable consequence" means that the occurrence of the consequence need not be more probable than not, but must be probable as distinct from possible. It must be probable in the sense that it could well happen."

They therefore concluded that the trial judged erred in his instructions to the jury.

They did not uphold the appeal, however, because they held (Kirby J dissenting on this point) that the proviso that no substantial miscarriage of justice had occurred applied in this case.
