= Crimes Act 1914 =

Legislation of the Australian Parliament

Parliament of Australia
- Long title: An Act relating to Offences against the Commonwealth
- Citation: No. 12 of 1914 or No. 12, 1914 as amended
- Territorial extent: This Act applies throughout the whole of the Commonwealth and the Territories and also applies beyond the Commonwealth and the Territories (States and territories of Australia).
- Enacted by: Parliament of Australia
- Commenced: 12 September 1914

Keywords
- Australian Federal Criminal Law, Federal Crimes, Federal Offences
- Status: In force

The Crimes Act 1914 (Cth) is an act of the Parliament of Australia which addresses the most serious federal offences—that is, crimes against the Commonwealth. It was the first major federal criminal law since the Federation of Australia in 1901, since most criminal law of Australia was, and still is, handled by the states and territories rather than at the federal level.

== Act ==
Amongst other things, volume 2 of the act deals with offences against the administration of justice in federal proceedings, piracy, and offences relating to postal services.

=== Structure ===
==== Volume 1 ====
- Part I – Preliminary;
- Part IAA – Search, information gathering, arrest and related powers (other than powers under delayed notification search warrants;
- Part IAAA – Delayed notification search warrants;
- Part IAAB – Monitoring of compliance with control orders etc.;
- Part IAB – Controlled operations;
- Part IABA – Integrity testing;
- Part IAC – Assumed identities;
- Part IACA – Witness identity protection for operatives;
- Part IAD – Protecting vulnerable persons;
- Part IAE – Video link evidence in proceedings for terrorism and related offences etc.;
- Part IB – Sentencing, imprisonment and release of federal offenders;
- Part IC – Investigation of Commonwealth offences;

==== Volume 2 ====
- Part ID – Forensic procedures;
- Part IE – Forfeiture of child abuse material;
- Part IIA – Protection of public and other services;
- Part III – Offences relating to the administration of justice;
- Part IV – Piracy;
- Part VIIA – Offences relating to postal services;
- Part VIIC – Pardons, quashing of convictions, spent convictions;
- Part VIID – Collecting, using and disclosing personal information that may be relevant for integrity purposes;
- Part VIII – Miscellaneous
- Schedule – Form of explanation under section 23V

== Analysis ==
=== Constitutional basis ===
The act is one of many current Commonwealth legislation that deals with federal crimes in Australia. Generally, criminal law is a state-law matter, as state and territory governments are mandated under their respective constitutions to legislate for the peace, order, and good government of their respective jurisdictions. But, while there is no general constitutional basis for the Commonwealth to legislate in criminal law, federal legislation exists to deal with crimes of a federal nature.

There are currently three main bases in the Australian Constitution that the Commonwealth Parliament relies on as the constitutional basis to legislate relating to criminal law. The first basis relied on is section 51(xxxix) (the 'incidental power'), the second basis is the implied incidental power under the heads of powers in sections 51 and 52 of the Constitution, and the third basis being executive power under section 61 of the Constitution.

== Legacy ==
Historically, it has been the most extensive legislative instrument that dealt with federal offences, but is being gradually superseded since the passing of the Criminal Code Act 1995 (Cth), which began the codification of all federal offences.

== See also ==
- Crimes Act
