= Law Enforcement Conduct Commission =

Australian police oversight organisation

- Common name: The police watchdog
- Abbreviation: LECC

Agency overview
- Formed: 1 July 2017
- Preceding agencies: Police Integrity Commission; Police and Compliance Branch of the Ombudsman

Jurisdictional structure
- Operations jurisdiction: New South Wales, Australia
- Legal jurisdiction: NSW law enforcement

Operational structure
- Overseen by Inspectorate and parliamentary committee: Inspector of the Law Enforcement Conduct Commission; Parliamentary Joint Committee on the Office of the Ombudsman, the Law Enforcement Conduct Commission and the Crime Commission
- Elected officer responsible: Chris Minns, Premier
- Agency executives: The Hon. Peter Johnson SC, Chief Commissioner; Anina Johnson, Commissioner; Gary Kirkpatrick, Executive Director Operations; Christina Anderson, CEO

Website
- lecc.nsw.gov.au

The Law Enforcement Conduct Commission oversights, monitors and investigates allegations of serious misconduct by the NSW Police Force (NSWPF) and NSW Crime Commission (NSWCC). It was set up on 1 July 2017 to replace the Police Integrity Commission and the Police and Compliance Branch of the Office of the Ombudsman

The Law Enforcement Conduct Commission (LECC) independently oversights the handling of complaints about officers and administrative staff of the NSWPF and the NSWCC. The LECC is accountable to the people of NSW and is subject to scrutiny by the Inspector of the LECC and the Parliamentary Joint Committee. The LECC is a state based Australian public sector integrity agency.

The Inspector of the Law Enforcement Conduct Commission is a statutory position which investigates complaints against the Law Enforcement Conduct Commission (LECC) in New South Wales, a state of Australia. It was established along with the LECC on 1 July 2017. Bruce McClintock SC is the Inspector of the LECC. The first Inspector to be appointed was former Supreme Court judge Terry Buddin, in 2017.

== Primary functions of the LECC ==
The Law Enforcement Conduct Commission Act 2016 (NSW) governs the work and goals of the LECC which include:

- promoting the integrity and good reputation of the NSWPF and the NSWCC by ensuring that they properly conduct their functions and responsibilities in relation to the handling of complaints
- providing for the independent detection, investigation and exposure of serious misconduct and serious maladministration within they NSWPF and the NSWCC
- providing oversight and review of misconduct investigations conducted by the NSWPF and NSWCC
- identifying systemic issues that are likely to contribute to officer misconduct and agency maladministration
- assessing the effectiveness and appropriateness of NSWPF procedures
- providing for the independent oversight and real-time monitoring of critical incident investigations undertaken by the NSWPF.

The Law Enforcement Conduct Commission Act 2016 (NSW) states that the NSWPF and NSWCC are primarily responsible for the investigation and prevention of misconduct and maladministration, with oversight by the LECC.

== Assessing complaints ==
The core function of the LECC is to assess complaints. The LECC receives complaints directly, via the NSWPF complaints database, and via NSWCC. The LECC assesses all direct complaints and complaints made to the NSWPF that are notifiable.

== What are notifiable complaints? ==
The LECC and the NSWPF entered into an agreement under to section 14 of the LECC Act (referred to as the Section 14 Guidelines) in November 2017. This agreement, updated in November 2022, outlines the categories of complaints that should be notified to the LECC. The types of misconduct frequently referred to the LECC include allegations of:

- fail to comply with the Law Enforcement (Powers and Responsibilities) Act 2002 (NSW),
- declarable associations,
- unreasonable use of force,
- failure to investigate or inadequate investigation; and
- Statements of Claim raising questions of serious misconduct.

Of the complaints made directly to the NSWPF, the LECC assesses all notifiable complaints and determines whether:

- the NSWPF has identified all relevant issues;
- the LECC agrees with the NSWPF decision to investigate, or otherwise deal with, the misconduct matter;
- the LECC will monitor the NSWPF investigation; or
- the LECC will take over the investigation of the complaint.

If the LECC disagrees with the police's decision to decline to investigate a notifiable misconduct matter, it can compel the NSWPF to investigate the matter and notify the complainant of that fact.

The LECC assessed over 21,000 complaints in its first 6 years of operation.

== Oversight of complaint handling ==
Another function of the LECC is to ensure that the NSWPF and the NSWCC deal with misconduct matters appropriately. The Oversight Investigations team under to Part 8A of the Police Act 1990 review the NSWPF's completed misconduct matter investigations. The purpose of the oversight is to ensure that the NSWPF has conducted those investigations reasonably and with appropriate outcomes.

The LECC can oversight investigations in 2 ways:

- by monitoring the progress of the investigation in real time, or
- by considering the adequacy of the investigation and outcome once the NSWPF or NSWCC investigation is finalised.

If the LECC is not satisfied with the agency's investigation, it may request further information, request further investigations be conducted, and request management actions be reconsidered. If the LECC is not satisfied with the decision of the relevant agency, it may refer criminal charges to the Director of Public Prosecutions, provide a report to the police Commissioner and Minister or make a public report.

== Investigating serious officer misconduct ==
Section 10 of the LECC Act defines serious misconduct as any one of the following:

(a) conduct of a police officer, administrative employee or Crime Commission officer that could result in prosecution of the officer or employee for a serious offence or serious disciplinary action against the officer or employee for a disciplinary infringement,

(b) a pattern of officer misconduct, officer maladministration or agency maladministration carried out on more than one occasion, or that involves more than one participant, that is indicative of systemic issues that could adversely reflect on the integrity and good repute of the NSW Police Force or the Crime Commission,

(c) corrupt conduct of a police officer, administrative employee or Crime Commission officer.

The LECC's Integrity Division investigates allegations of serious misconduct and serious maladministration. Part 6 of the LECC Act empowers the LECC to obtain information from the NSWPF and the NSWCC, issue search warrants and conduct examinations both publicly and privately. The Investigations Unit sits within the Integrity Division. It consists of a multi-disciplinary team of senior investigators, a senior financial investigator, investigators, and intelligence analysts. Other teams within the LECC support the LECC's investigations as well as the Oversight Investigations Team, Legal Services, Assessment team, Prevention and Education, Electronic Collections and Covert Services.

== Monitoring critical incident investigations ==
A critical incident is an incident that results in death or serious injury to a person which arises from police actions or involvement. The LECC independently monitors all critical incident investigations. In monitoring Critical Incidents, the LECC considers whether the NSWPF has considered the lawfulness and reasonableness of the actions of NSWPF officers involved in the critical incident, if the actions of police followed relevant policies and procedures, any complaints about the conduct of the involved officers, and any systemic issues arising from the actions of the NSWPF officers.

== Preventing officer misconduct ==
The LECC's Prevention and Education team undertakes research and investigations that focus on systemic misconduct or maladministration in the NSWPF and NSWCC. The team considers the practices and processes of these agencies, as well as compliance with legislation and policies. The team can make recommendations to improve the way the NSWPF or the NSWCC identify and prevent misconduct, unlawful actions, and unreasonable practices. The team's recommendations can address issues such as the clarity of policies and instructions given to officers, the level of supervision officers receive, and officer training and education.

== Inspection of NSWPF and NSWCC records and reports ==
The LECC regularly reviews the systems the NSWPF and the NSWCC use to manage misconduct. This allows the LECC to understand the operation of policies and processes related to the way the NSWPF and NSWCC handle misconduct matters.

== History ==
The LECC was set up following former NSW Shadow Attorney General Andrew Tink's extensive review of law enforcement oversight in NSW (review). The review recommended:

- creating a single, independent civilian oversight body for the NSWPF and the NSWCC to strengthen and streamline law enforcement oversight in NSW.
- that the new oversight body take on the Police Integrity Commission's functions and the functions of the Police and Compliance Branch of the Office of the Ombudsman.
- that the new civilian oversight body be structured in a way that allowed it to keep a strong focus of its two key functions, being the detection and investigation of serious misconduct, and the oversight of the NSWPF's complaint investigations.
- that the new oversight body has the statutory power to monitor critical incidents investigations.
- that the NSWPF should continue to be responsible for investigating critical incidents as it has the appropriate investigate skills necessary to investigate critical incidents.

The role of the LECC was to monitor the investigation of critical incidents from the time of the incident until the completion of the police investigation to provide assurance to the public and the next of kin that police investigate critical incidents in a competent, thorough, and objective manner.

The NSW Government first announced the establishment of the LECC in 2015.

== Commissioners ==
In January 2017, it was announced that former NSW Supreme Court justice Michael Adams would be its first Chief Commissioner. Chief Commissioner Adams completed his term in February 2020.

In April 2017, the Commissioner of Integrity, the Hon Lea Drake, joined the LECC. Commissioner Drake completed her term on 11 April 2022.

In June 2017, the Commissioner for Oversight, Mr Patrick Saidi, joined the LECC. Commissioner Saidi's appointment was terminated on 15 January 2020.

In February 2020, the Chief Commissioner, the Hon R O Blanch AM QC, joined the LECC. Chief Commissioner Blanch completed his term on 3 July 2022.

The LECC Act was amended by the Law Enforcement Conduct Commission Amendment (Commissioners) Act 2021 and came into effect on 17 June 2021. The Amendment Act amended the LECC Act to remove the office of the Commissioner for Oversight and to rename the office of the Commissioner for Integrity as the Commissioner.

In 2022, the Governor of NSW appointed two new Commissioners to lead the LECC. The Hon. Peter Johnson SC started his appointment as Chief Commissioner on 4 July 2022. Anina Johnson started her term as Commissioner on 16 May 2022.

== Oversight of the LECC ==
=== Inspector ===
The Inspector of the Law Enforcement Conduct Commission is an independent statutory position. It was established along with the LECC on 1 July 2017.

The Inspector's functions are set out in Part 9 of the LECC Act. The Inspector audits the operations of the LECC, assesses the effectiveness of the LECC's policies and procedures and deals with complaints made to the Inspector about maladministration and/or misconduct on the part of the LECC and/or its officers, including former officers.

The first Inspector to be appointed was former Supreme Court judge Terry Buddin, in 2017. On 1 July 2022, Mr Bruce McClintock SC started his appointment as the Inspector of the LECC.

=== Parliamentary Joint Committee ===
The functions of the Parliamentary Joint Committee (PJC), as they relate to the LECC, are set out in section 131 of the LECC Act. The PJC reviews the performance of the LECC and the Inspector of the LECC, examines its reports including the Annual report and reports to Parliament on any matters that the PCJ thinks should be brought to the attention of the Parliament.

== Investigations ==
In March 2021, a Commission investigation found that police officers tasked with investigating outlaw motorcycle gangs had harassed a solicitor in retaliation for his actions in representing a member of one of those gangs in criminal proceedings. Due to the police harassment, the solicitor was forced to withdraw from representing his client.

The commission's Inquiry into NSW Police Force strip search practices investigated the New South Wales Police Force strip search scandal.

== Controversy ==
In March 2018, the LECC complained that, due to funding cuts, it had been unable to investigate over 50 complaints of police misconduct over the preceding seven months.

In August 2018, Chief Commissioner Adams alleged that the then-NSW Police Minister, Troy Grant, had instructed him not to hire senior staff from the former Police Integrity Commission, on the grounds that doing so would upset the police union, the NSW Police Association.

In June 2020, the NSW Government proposed expanding the eligibility for the role of Chief Commissioner beyond retired judges; the state opposition objected that the proposal was an example of the government "failing to take oversight bodies seriously".
