= Don Weatherburn =

Donald James Weatherburn PSM (born 14 May 1951) was Director of the NSW Bureau of Crime Statistics and Research in Sydney from 1988 until July 2019. He is a professor at the National Drug and Alcohol Research Centre at the University of New South Wales and a Fellow of the Academy of the Social Sciences in Australia.

== Early life ==
Weatherburn attended Newington College (1964–1969) and the University of Sydney where in 1974 he received his BA with first class honours. He completed a Ph.D. at the University of Sydney in 1979 and lectured in the School of Justice Administration at Charles Sturt University.

== Career ==
In 1983 Weatherburn was appointed Senior Research Officer at the NSW Bureau of Crime Statistics and Research (BOCSAR) and four years later he was appointed Foundation Director of Research at the NSW Judicial Commission. He was Director of BOCSAR from 1988 until 3 July 2019.

For his contribution to public debate about crime and justice, he was awarded the Public Service Medal in January 1998. In 2000 he received an Alumni Award for Community Service from the University of Sydney.

Following the introduction in February 2014 of the New South Wales lockout laws which limited the sale of alcohol in the Sydney CBD and Kings Cross, Weatherburn released a study arguing that the drop in the number of alcohol-related assaults since the new laws was "simply precipitous" and "one of the most dramatic effects I've seen in my time, of policy intervention to reduce crime".

In September 2018 Weatherburn admitted his Bureau was at fault for releasing misleading drug detection results. Figures in some cases were doubled, after BOCSAR had mistakenly added positive results to searches by NSW Police.

== Publications ==
- Delinquent-prone Communities (Cambridge University Press, 2001)
- Law and Order in Australia: Rhetoric and Reality (Federation Press, 2004)
- Arresting Incarceration: Pathways Out of Indigenous Imprisonment (Aboriginal Studies Press, 2014)
- The Vanishing Criminal: Causes of Decline in Australia’s Crime Rate (Melbourne University Press, 2021) Joint author: Sara Rahman.
