= New South Wales Crime Commission =

Australian law enforcement agency

- Common name: NSW Crime Commission
- Abbreviation: NSWCC

Agency overview
- Formed: 20 January 1986
- Preceding agency: State Drug Crime Commission
- Employees: 150
- Annual budget: $23,000,000

Jurisdictional structure
- Operations jurisdiction: New South Wales, Australia
- Constituting instruments: Crime Commission Act 2012; Criminal Assets Recovery Act 1990

Operational structure
- Headquarters: 453–463 Kent Street, Sydney, Australia
- Elected officer responsible: Yasmin Catley, Minister for Police and Counter-terrorism
- Agency executive: Stephen Dametto, Commissioner
- Units: 5: Criminal Investigations Division; Financial Investigations Division; Corporate Services Division; Governance Unit; Legal Unit

Website
- www.crimecommission.nsw.gov.au

The New South Wales Crime Commission is a statutory corporation of the Government of New South Wales. It is constituted by the Crime Commission Act 2012, the object of which is to reduce the incidence of organised crime and other serious crime in the state of New South Wales, Australia.

In more recent years, the commission has also taken on a charter of assisting with the investigation of terrorism related offences. However, it became the subject of controversy following various allegations relating covert operations, secrecy and absence of defined accountability, and the conviction of an assistant director for serious criminal activities. In August 2011 the NSW Government announced that a Special Commission of Inquiry would be conducted into the NSW Crime Commission. Headed by retired Supreme Court justice David Patten, the Inquiry handed its report to the Government on 30 November 2011. Its findings have been made public. It found no evidence of misconduct or impropriety other than that of the assistant director, whose arrest and conviction could not have been achieved without the investigative work of the Crime Commission.

== History ==
The commission was originally established under the name State Drug Crime Commission by the State Drug Crime Commission Act 1985, the Bill for which was introduced by then state premier, Neville Wran after a period of seminal Royal Commissions, including the Woodward Royal Commission (1977–1979) and the Costigan Royal Commission (1980–1984) into drug trafficking, organised crime and tax evasion.

The commission was originally constituted by a Chairman and two other members. The first chairman of the State Drug Crime Commission (SDCC) was Judge John Lloyd-Jones, who was replaced after only four weeks following objection by the legal fraternity to the principle of a judicial officer's presiding over an investigative body. Richard Job, QC succeeded Lloyd-Jones as chairman, and the SDCC was led by Job together with Barrie Thorley, a former judge, and a retired vice-admiral, David Leach.

The name of the commission and its statute were changed in 1990. In that year the Drug Trafficking (Civil Proceedings) Act 1990 (later renamed the Criminal Assets Recovery Act 1990) was enacted and conferred on the commission the role of taking legal action to confiscate the proceeds of crime.

Phillip Bradley was appointed a member in 1989 and became chairman in 1993. In 1996 the office of Chairman was abolished and replaced by the position of Commissioner. Bradley served as the first Commissioner.

The commission established itself as a successful criminal investigation and intelligence agency and a successful criminal asset confiscation agency.

In the period leading up to the 2011 state election, the commission was the subject of several allegations regarding its practices. Those allegations were not sustained.

In February 2011, the Police Integrity Commission made a decision to hold a public inquiry into the NSWCC as part of a PIC investigation that had been underway since 2008. The nature of the investigations conducted by the PIC related to the way the NSW Crime Commission managed its asset-confiscation powers. PIC investigations revealed that the commission and lawyers acting for alleged and convicted criminals negotiated legal costs, sometimes in an extremely short timeframe. The Crime Commission took the matter to the Supreme Court. The Commission sought an order quashing (on the ground of legal error by the PIC) the February 2011 PIC decision to hold public hearings, and the Supreme Court agreed and quashed the decision. The commission also sought to narrow the scope of the PIC hearings, and the Supreme Court made such an order, although the narrowing was not as great as the Crime Commission had sought. The controversy expanded as the commission was accused of undermining free speech by demanding records and phones from Fairfax journalists. With the matter still before the court, on 6 May 2011 the New South Wales Government extended the appointment of Bradley for a further six months. In May 2011, after the court had quashed the PIC's February decision, the Police Integrity Commission made a fresh decision to conduct a public inquiry into whether the Crime Commission acted outside the laws that govern the confiscation of criminal proceeds, and whether it had abused some of the processes of the court.

In January 2026, the New South Wales government announced that Stephen Dametto would become commissioner on 24 February 2026.

=== Conviction of assistant director ===
On 11 August 2011, after a five-month trial, a NSW Supreme Court jury found former NSWCC assistant director Mark Standen guilty of conspiring to import and supply 300 kilograms (660 lb) of pseudoephedrine, a chemical that could produce A$60 million worth of "ice", or crystal methamphetamine. He was also found guilty of perverting the course of justice. In a 30-year career, Standen had risen to prominence in the perceived fight against organised crime in New South Wales, trusted by ministers and police commissioners, having previously served with the Australian Federal Police (AFP) and the Australian Customs Service. He was arrested by the AFP on 2 June 2008 after intensive surveillance and investigation, conducted jointly with the Crime Commission. Handing down the sentence on 8 December 2011, Justice Bruce James stated that Standen had shown no remorse during criminal proceedings and sentenced him to a maximum term of 22-years in custody. Standen may be eligible for early release on parole by 1 June 2024.

Standen appealed his conviction and sentence on six grounds. His appeal was rejected on 13 August 2015.

=== Patten Report ===
On the same day of Standen's conviction, the NSW Government announced that a Special Commission of Inquiry would be conducted into the affairs of the NSWCC. Handing his report to the NSW Government on 30 November 2011, it was reported that the Special Commissioner, retired Supreme Court justice David Patten, recommended sweeping changes to the NSWCC including to its governance structure, legislation, management of informants, complaint handling, auditing and oversight. The NSW Parliament later passed the Crime Commission Act 2012.

== Governance ==
The functions of the commission are discharged by its Commissioner, two Assistant Commissioners and staff.

The commission is overseen by the New South Wales Crime Commission Management Committee, which consists of:

- the Independent Chairperson, presently David Patten
- the Commissioner of NSW Police, presently Mal Lanyon
- the Chair of the board of the Australian Crime Commission, presently Tony Negus
- the Chief Executive Officer of the Ministry for Police and Emergency Services and
- the Commissioner for the New South Wales Crime Commission, presently Stephen Dametto

== Operations ==
The New South Wales Crime Commission works closely with the NSW Police Force.

== See also ==
- New South Wales Police Force
- Police Integrity Commission
