= Bureau of Crime Statistics and Research =

Agency of NSW Department of Communities and Justice

NSW Bureau of Crime Statistics and Research
Agency overview
- Formed: 1969
- Type: Agency
- Jurisdiction: New South Wales
- Headquarters: 6 Parramatta Square, 10 Darcy Street, Parramatta, NSW, Australia
- Minister responsible: Michael Daley, Attorney General
- Agency executive: Jackie Fitzgerald, Executive Director
- Parent Agency: Department of Communities and Justice
- Website: BOCSAR

The Bureau of Crime Statistics and Research (BOCSAR), also known as NSW Bureau of Crime Statistics and Research, is an agency of the Department of Communities and Justice responsible for research into crime and criminal justice and evaluation of the initiatives designed to reduce crime and reoffending in the state of New South Wales, Australia.

== Management and functions ==
BOCSAR was established in 1969.

The executive director of BOCSAR since July 2019 is Jackie Fitzgerald. She took over from Don Weatherburn PSM, who spent over 30 years in the position.

The Bureau is responsible for identifying factors affecting the distribution and frequency of crime and the effectiveness of the NSW criminal justice system, and for making this information available to its clients.

It develops and maintains statistical databases on crime and criminal justice in NSW, monitors trends in crime and criminal justice, and also conducts research on crime and criminal justice issues and problems.

== Statistical information publicly available ==
Statistical information and various publications of the Bureau are accessible by the public.

Information about crime that is typically stored in the databases includes:

- The type of offence committed
- Time and location of the offence
- The age, gender, plea, outcome of court appearance and penalty (in the cases of persons charged with criminal offences who appear before the courts)

Aggregated data can answer questions such as which areas have high reported crime rates, how many people are charged with a specific offence, or what penalties are imposed for specific offences.

== In the news ==
In September 2018, then director Weatherburn admitted the Bureau was at fault for releasing misleading drug detection results. Figures in some cases were doubled, after BOCSAR had mistakenly added positive results to searches by NSW Police. However errors like this one have been extremely rare.

In early 2019, Weatherburn announced a new BOCSAR review of circle sentencing (a process which puts Aboriginal adult offenders before a circle of elders, members of the community, police and the judiciary, rather than a traditional courtroom), with results due in 2020. The previous one had been published in 2008.

== See also ==
- Government of New South Wales
- List of New South Wales government agencies
