= Rukshan Perera =

- Born: 17 June 1956 (age 70); Colombo, Sri Lanka
- Genres: Pop; jazz; blues; folk
- Occupations: Singer; songwriter; composer; arranger
- Instruments: Guitar; piano; harmonica; flute
- Years active: 1966–present
- Website: www.rukshanperera.com

Rukshan Perera (born 17 June 1956) is a Sri Lankan-born singer-songwriter, record producer, international recording, television star, and a multi-instrumentalist.

== Biography ==
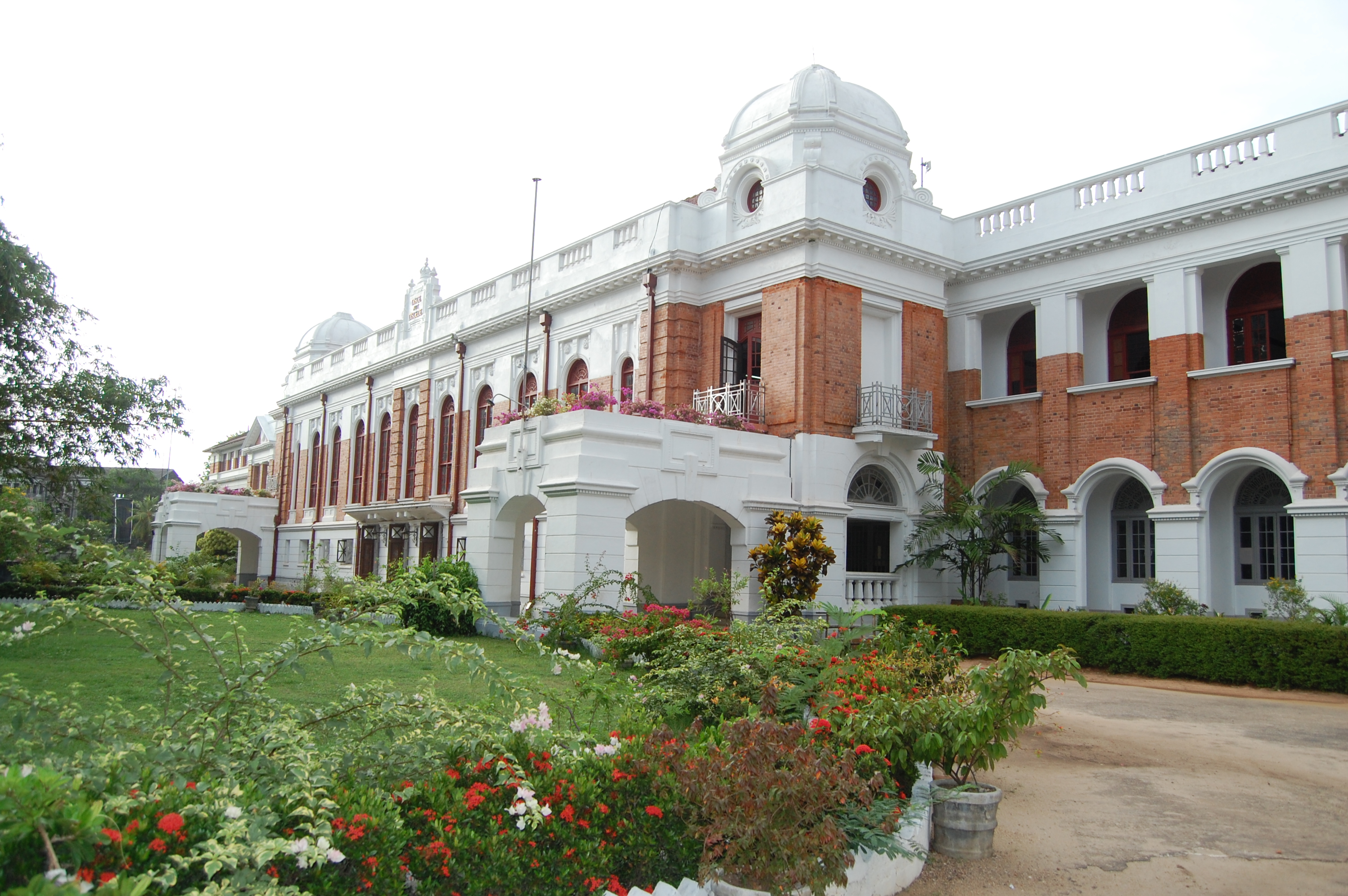
Rukshan Perera attended the Royal College, Colombo.

He was born in Colombo, to a musical family. Rukshan got his first piano lesson at age five from his mother, a well known music teacher/church organist for fifty years in Moratuwa. Rukshan became a self-taught guitarist and formed his first family band at the age of twelve and performed over Radio Ceylon. He was educated at the Royal College, Colombo. As a young teenage musician, Rukshan Perera joined a group as a keyboardist whilst still a school boy at Royal College, fronted by Sri Lanka's 'King of Pop' Clarence Wijewardena and his partner Annesley Malewana. The group known as the 'Super Golden Chimes' went on to reach the heights of success in Sri Lanka. The 'Super Golden Chimes' received constant airplay over the airwaves of Radio Ceylon and subsequently the Sri Lanka Broadcasting Corporation making them household names on the island and across South Asia. He has also played with The Esquire Set, Serendib and the 'Golden Chimes' group. Rukshan plays the guitar, harmonica, piano and several other instruments. The Sunday Times newspaper in Sri Lanka noted that 'Rukshan Perera is an accomplished, highly experienced and insanely talented musician.' Rukshan Perera is a well known Jazz artist who has also mastered 'Sinhala acapellas'. The Sunday Island newspaper in Colombo observed that his (music) repertoire ranged from pop, jazz, blues to fusion and a cappella, renditions and being a multi-instrumentalist, he enthralled the audience with his virtuosity, playing guitar, piano, flute and harmonica.' He lived in the United States for almost three decades. Rukshan took a break from music, threw himself into an academic career, acquired a bachelor's degree in Information Systems, added a Masters in Business Administration, and joined the consumer product company Philip Morris as an IT Manager.

At a concert in New York sponsored by Philip Morris he played along with well-known jazz names. He was the only novice and he survived creditably and then performed on an off including a gig with the Sri Lankan bassist Hussain Jiffry. Having lived in the United States since 1980, Rukshan Perera decided to return to the land of his birth. Rukshan Perera has recorded two CD albums and performed 'live' concerts in Sri Lanka and around the world including the United States of America. He has also introduced 'harmony whistle' and 'harmony scatting,' not seen anywhere else. Whistling the melody and the harmony together is a rare talent that Rukshan possesses for which his name has even been proposed for the Guinness Book of World Records by his fans.

== Discography ==
=== Singles ===
- "Coming Home To You"
- "Feel Like A Butterfly"
- "I'll Keep Fighting"
- "Just For You"
- "Let's Make History"
- "Nature's Calling"
- "One Land For All"
- "Reality"
- "Something Is Happening"
- "Sri Lankan Blues"
- "What Time Is It?"

=== Albums ===
- Coming Home To You
- Rukshan Perera – Live in Concert
