= Police Integrity Commission =

Defunct Australian police oversight organisation

- Crest of the PIC
- Abbreviation: PIC

Agency overview
- Formed: 1 July 1996
- Dissolved: 1 July 2017
- Superseding agency: Law Enforcement Conduct Commission

Jurisdictional structure
- Operations jurisdiction: New South Wales, Australia
- Constituting instrument: Police Integrity Act 1996 (NSW)
- Specialist jurisdiction: Anti-corruption

Operational structure
- Overseen by Inspectorate and parliamentary committee: Inspector of the Police Integrity Commission; Parliamentary Joint Committee on the Ombudsman, the Police Integrity Commission and the Crime Commission
- Headquarters: St James Centre, Level 3, 111 Elizabeth Street, Sydney NSW 2000, Australia
- Minister responsible: Hon. Gladys Berejiklian MP, Premier of New South Wales
- Agency executive: Bruce James QC, Commissioner

Website
- pic.nsw.gov.au

The Police Integrity Commission, was a statutory corporation of the New South Wales Government, responsible for the prevention, detection, and investigation of alleged serious misconduct in the Police Force in the state of New South Wales, Australia. The mission of the commission was to be an effective agent in the reduction of serious police misconduct. On 1 July 2017, the Police Integrity Commission was abolished and replaced by the Law Enforcement Conduct Commission.

The commission was established on 1 July 1996 pursuant to the Police Integrity Act 1996 (NSW) following the Wood Royal Commission into the New South Wales Police Service.

The commission was led by a Commissioner. The Commission initially reported to the Minister for Police and Emergency Services, back then it reported to the Premier of New South Wales. An independent Inspector of the Police Integrity Commission provided oversight of the operational functions of the commission.

== History ==
Prior to the commission's establishment, matters of police integrity were dealt with by the Police Tribunal of New South Wales. The commission was set up following a recommendation by the Royal Commission into the New South Wales Police Service. That recommendation, among others, led to a radical transformation of the police service in New South Wales. The commission was the successor to the Royal Commission, although the commission's powers and duties were far more extensive than those granted to the Royal Commission.

The Commission looked into serious police misconduct and could refuse to investigate. There was no other body or Commission that looked into police misconduct except for the NSW Ombudsman. However, the Ombudsman, as a matter of procedure, would refer any complaints made about police or unsatisfactory police investigations back to the area command or the investigating officer.

On 26 November 2015 Police Minister Troy Grant announced that the PIC would be replaced by the Law Enforcement Conduct Commission. On 8 November 2016 legislation was passed by the NSW Parliament to establish the commission.

== Constitution ==
The commission was established under the Police Integrity Act 1996 (NSW). The act set out the principal functions of the commission. They included:

- preventing, detecting or investigating serious police misconduct;
- managing or overseeing other agencies in the detection and investigation of serious police misconduct and other police misconduct; and
- manage matters not completed by the Royal Commission into the New South Wales Police Service.

The Commission employed a variety of experienced staff including lawyers, accountants, police, investigators and analysts. Where police officers were employed, they were employed from overseas or interstate.

The commission had extensive powers to summons witnesses and require the production of documents by third parties in relation to an investigation. The Commissioner could issue a warrant for the arrest of a witness who does not appear in answer to a summons. The Commissioner could direct that a prisoner be brought out of prison to be examined. The commission could also issue search warrants to search and seize property.

== Hearings ==
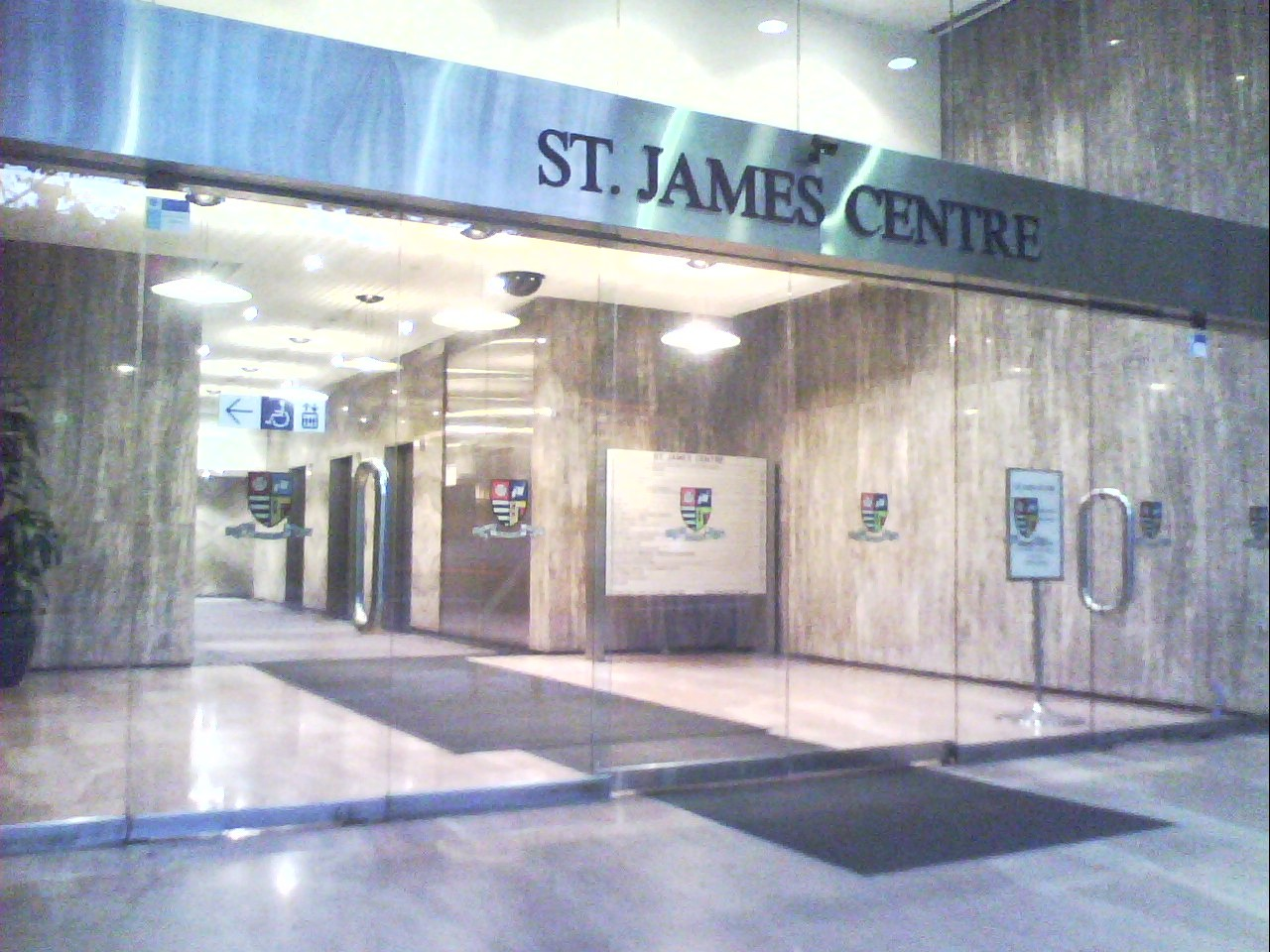
The St. James Centre in Elizabeth Street, Sydney where the Police Integrity Commission was based.

The commission could conduct public or private hearings depending on the nature of the allegations. A hearing could be partly heard in private and partly in public. The Commissioner had the discretion to allow persons to appear and take part in a hearing. There was no automatic right of appearance. Similarly, the Commissioner could allow a person to be legally represented. Generally, the commission had to give a person giving evidence the opportunity to be legally represented.

Its hearings, when in Sydney, were held in its headquarters in the St James Centre, which was located at Level 3, 111 Elizabeth Street, in the Sydney CBD.

== Parliamentary Joint Committee ==
The committee on the Ombudsman, the Police Integrity Commission and the Crime Commission was a joint statutory committee of the Parliament of New South Wales that was established on 4 December 1990, and re-established 22 June 2011, that had a statutory oversight over the commission. This oversight included monitoring and reviewing the exercise by the Commission and the Inspector of the Police Integrity Commission of their functions. The committee could report to both Houses of Parliament on any of those matters raised. The committee also examined each annual report and other report of the commission and of the Inspector and reported to both Houses of Parliament on any matter arising out those reports. The committee also examined trends and changes in police corruption, and practices and methods relating to police corruption, and reported to both Houses of Parliament any changes which the Joint Committee thinks desirable to the functions, structures and procedures of the Commission and the Inspector. Lastly, the committee could inquire into any question in connection with its functions which is referred to it by both Houses of Parliament, and report to both Houses on that question.

== Inspector of the commission ==
The Act provided for the appointment of an inspector of the Commission. The inspector was an independent person of the commission that had the authority to investigate complaints against the commission.

== See also ==
- New South Wales Police Force
