= Law Reform Commission of New South Wales =

Advisory commission in New South Wales, Australia

Agency overview
- Formed: 1966
- Jurisdiction: New South Wales
- Headquarters: Sydney, New South Wales, Australia
- Minister responsible: Attorney General of New South Wales
- Agency executive: Chairman of the Commission; Policy Manager

The New South Wales Law Reform Commission is a commission to investigate, review and advise on the reform of the law in New South Wales, a state of Australia. The present commission came into existence on 25 September 1967 although it had been administratively established previously in 1966.

== History ==
There has been a history of law reform in common law countries such as Australia. Prior to the establishment of the commission, various parliamentary inquiries, ad hoc commissions (e.g., Commissioner's Bigg report into the New South Wales legal system in 1820), or panels had advised on law reform.

The commission was the first permanent body established in Australia to continually conduct and investigate law reform. Its establishment is important as it was an independent body that could devote its deliberations full-time to examining law reform in the state

The first real law reform commission in the state was one set up in 1870 by the New South Wales Legislative Assembly and set up by letters patent of 14 July 1870. The commission consisted of the five lawyers and the Chief Justice of New South Wales, Sir Alfred Stephen. This Commission prepared a draft bill to simplify equity procedure and indicated the need for consolidation and reform of lunacy, insolvency and jury laws. Its only success came long after the body lapsed with the eventual enactment of part of its proposed Criminal Law Consolidation and Amendment Bill in the Criminal Law Amendment Act of 1883.

== Constitution ==
The commission is established under the Law Reform Commission Act 1967 (NSW). The Governor of New South Wales may appoint a chairperson of the commission. The current chairperson is Alan Cameron AO.

The governor may also appoint deputy chairpersons of the commission. The governor must also appoint two other commissioners to the commission. Both the chairperson and the commissioners must be: (a) is or was the holder of a judicial office; (b) has experience as an Australian legal practitioner in legal practice; (c) has experience as a teacher of law; or, (d) has academic attainment in law. Commissioners may be appointed as full-time or part-time commissioners.

== Functions ==
The duties and powers of the Commission are outlined in Law Reform Commission Act 1967 (NSW), which indicate the wide-ranging purposes of inquiry and legislative reform such as review, consolidation or repeal. Under the Law Reform Commission Act, the commission may make interim and final reports on any of its work. The Attorney General of New South Wales may also direct the commission to make a report. The commission is also required to make an annual report on its work during the year. For the commission, the year starts in July and ends in the following June. The report is furnished to the Attorney-General who must then table the report in the New South Wales Parliament.

=== Work of the commission ===
Some of the recent reports of the commission include reports on Parole (2015), Encouraging appropriate early guilty pleas (2014), Criminal appeals (2014), Sentencing (2013), and People with cognitive and mental health impairments and the criminal justice system (2013).

== Chairpersons ==
From	To	Name	Postnominals	Notes
1966	1969	Hon. James Manning	QC	
1969	1972	Hon. Raymond Reynolds	QC	
1972	1976	Hon. Leycester Meares	QC	
1976	1981	Hon. Hal Wootten	QC	
1981	1984	Ronald Sackville		
1985	1987	Keith Mason	QC	
1987	1989	Helen Gamble		
1989	1990	Keith Mason	QC	
1990	1993	Hon. Robert Marsden Hope	AC, CMG, QC	
1993	1996	Hon. Gordon Samuels	AC, QC	
1996	2005	Hon. Michael Adams	QC	
2006	2014	Hon. James Roland Wood	AO, QC	
2015	2022	Alan Cameron	AO	
2022	Ongoing	Hon. Thomas Bathurst		
