= Mal Lanyon =

Australian police chief

Mal Lanyon APM
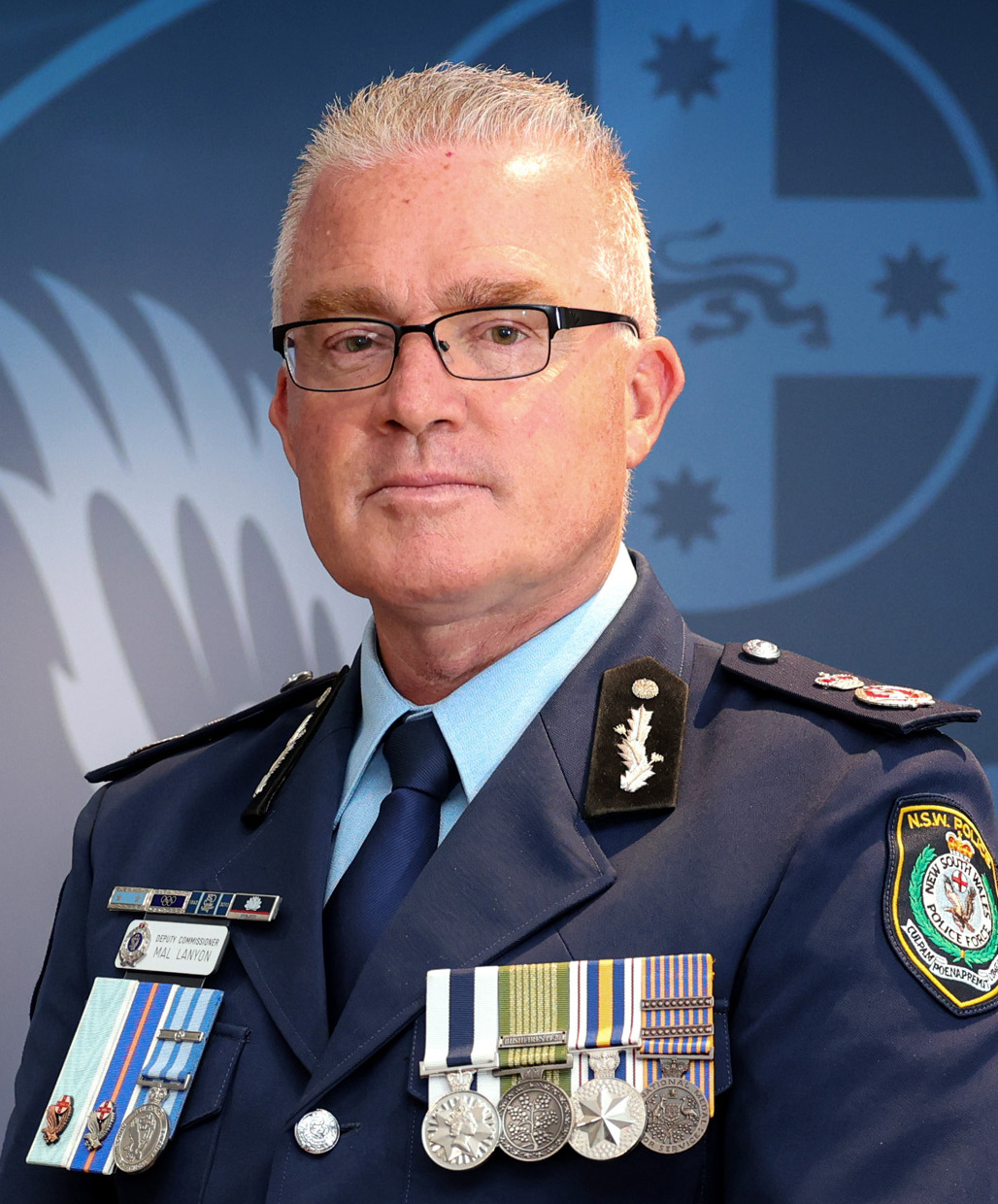
- Official portrait, 2025

Commissioner of the New South Wales Police Force
- Incumbent
- Assumed office 1 October 2025
- Preceded by: Karen Webb

Personal details
- Born: Malcolm Arthur Lanyon
- Spouse: Kellie Langley

Malcolm Arthur Lanyon APM is the Commissioner of the New South Wales Police Force in Australia. Lanyon is a career police officer, having served in the NSW Police Force since 1987.

== Background and education ==
Malcolm Arthur Lanyon grew up in Rydalmere and attended Macquarie Boys High School.

== Career ==
After completing his police training, Lanyon worked in the Eighth Division, which included challenging suburbs like Glebe, Balmain and Leichhardt. By 2007, he had risen to the position of detective inspector and detective superintendent by 2011. As he rose through the ranks, he was appointed to senior positions like assistant commissioner (state crime command).

In January 2019, Lanyon was appointed deputy commissioner (corporate services) and then deputy commissioner (metropolitan field operations).

After developing a "fractured relationship" with new commissioner Karen Webb and following the 2022 eastern Australia floods, Lanyon was seconded as the state emergency operations controller and then, on 8 March 2022, appointed northern NSW recovery coordinator. Then, in April 2024, Lanyon was appointed acting chief executive officer of the NSW Reconstruction Authority, where he remained until his appointment as police commissioner in October 2025.

== Controversies ==
On 25 February 2021, while he was in contention to replace retiring commissioner Mick Fuller, deputy commissioner Lanyon was scheduled to attend an event at Goulburn Police Academy. He stayed at the Mercure Hotel on the previous night. At 10:58 pm, police were called to a welfare check and found Lanyon near his hotel, lying on a footpath intoxicated. An ambulance was called and Lanyon became aggressive towards the paramedics, telling one of the paramedics to "fuck off". The paramedic then told Lanyon "don’t swear at me, I don’t come to work to be sworn at". Lanyon then turned towards the paramedic as if he wanted to shape up and strike him.” He also insisted on calling the chief executive of NSW Ambulance Dominic Morgan and the two had a "brief conversation" before the phone was handed back to the paramedic. Lanyon was eventually escorted to his hotel room. He later said that he had been training very hard that day for a charity bicycle ride and had ridden 300 km. However, he said that he drank more than he should have that night. Fuller was asked about the incident at a parliamentary hearing and testified that Lanyon had told him that the reason he required the assistance of paramedics was that he had suffered a “medical episode”, that alcohol was consumed but the consumption had not contributed to the "medical episode". Fuller claimed the episode was instead "related to either low blood pressure or low blood sugar.” Greens MP David Shoebridge noted that the ambulance report showed Mr Lanyon’s blood pressure was “healthy”. Karen Webb was subsequently appointed the new commissioner.

On 31 December 2023, Lanyon invited his wife and two friends onto an operational police boat, OPV Nemesis, on Sydney Harbour to view the New Years Eve fireworks. Lanyon claimed no alcohol was taken onto or consumed on the vessel that evening. The incident led to complaint being lodged with the Law Enforcement Conduct Commission. Lanyon admitted that he should have thought more carefully about the invitations.

When Lanyon was being considered as the next commissioner in 2025, NSW premier Chris Minns said "if we're only picking people who have got completely lily-white records then we'll be missing out on a lot of people who can contribute to public life in New South Wales. Upon being announced as commissioner, Lanyon said was now mindful of his drinking and practised moderation, and acknowledged his past misjudgements.

An editorial in The Sydney Morning Herald on 24 September 2025 was critical of Lanyon's appointment, calling it "one of the most flawed decisions made by the present NSW government" and noting that "the boys’ club is alive and well in Sydney".

== Personal life ==
Lanyon is married to Inspector Kellie Langley, also an officer in the NSW Police Force. He is a recreational cyclist and a supporter of Sydney Roosters rugby league club.

== Honours and achievements ==
Lanyon was awarded the Australian Police Medal in the Australia Day Honours on 26 January 2011.

Police appointments
Preceded by Karen Webb	Commissioner of the New South Wales Police Force since 2025	Succeeded by Incumbent
