= Australian Father of the Year award =

Privately-granted award

The Australian Father of the Year Award is presented annually to "a distinguished father who has demonstrated support, guidance and love to his children or other children through his working role or family life."

== Awards ==
The award was inaugurated in 1957 by The Australian Father's Day Council. The Shepherd Centre (TSC) has been involved from 1998 to 2021, in 2022 the award organisation was handed to The Fathering Project. Much like TSC, The Fathering Project together with the Australian Father's Day Council launch an annual campaign to find Australia's best high-profile father. The Fathering Project, in collaboration with the Australian Father's Day Council, continues to announce the winners annually.

The award is not associated with the Australian government run Australian of the Year awards.

== Past recipients ==
Awarded	Name	Post-nominals	Notes
2025	Dr. Arne Rubinstein	OAM	Recognised for their outstanding contributions to supporting children and families in Australia.
2024	David Campbell (singer) and his father, Jimmy Barnes	OAM	The Today Extra talk show host, singer, actor and his father, Cold Chisel frontman and singer.
2023	Hamish Blake	OAM	Australian comedian, television and radio presenter, actor and author
2022	Craig Foster	AM	Former Socceroo's captain and political activist
2021	Brendan Murphy		Former Chief Medical Officer of Australia
2020	Shane Fitzsimmons		Former Commissioner of the New South Wales Rural Fire Service and Head of Resilience NSW
2019	Mark Beretta		Television journalist
2018	Dick Smith	AC	Entrepreneur and philanthropist
2017	Mike Baird		Former Premier of New South Wales
2016	Lieutenant General David Hurley	AC, DSC	Governor of New South Wales
2015	Jamal Rifi		Doctor, founder of Australia Muslim Doctors against Violence
2014	Andrew Gaze	AM	Basketballer
2013	Corporal Ben Roberts-Smith	VC, MG	Soldier, later found at a civil defamation trial to be a war criminal
2012	John Symond	AM	Executive Chairman of Aussie Home Loans, and Chairman of Sydney Opera House Trust
2011	Air Chief Marshal Angus Houston	AC, AFC	Former Chief of the Defence Force
2010	Guy Cooper		Former Chief Executive of the Taronga and Western Plains Zoos
2009	Li Cunxin		Dancer
2008	Paul Roos		Footballer
2007	David Koch		Television presenter
2006	Ron Delezio		Founder of Day of Difference Foundation
2005	Steve Waugh	AO	Cricketer
2004	Graeme Clark	AC	Cochlear Implant developer
2003	Karl Kruszelnicki		Scientist
2002	Steve Vizard		Media personality
2001	Jim Rafter		Father of nine including tennis player Pat Rafter
2000	Stephen Biddulph	AM	Parenting activist
1999	Slim Dusty	AO, MBE	Musician
1998	Kamahl	AM	Musician
1997	John Howard		Prime Minister
1996	Rear Admiral Peter Ross Sinclair	AC, RAN	Governor of New South Wales
1995	Mark Taylor		Cricketer
1994	Sir James Hardy	OBE	America's Cup Sailor
1993	Michael Chugg		Music promoter
1992	Bill Crews		Minister
1991	Dr Bruce Shepherd		Known for his work in education for the deaf
1990	Peter Doyle		
1989	Ken Done		Artist
1988	Rear Admiral Sir David Martin	KCMG, AO, RAN	Governor of New South Wales
1987	A.H Pollard		Actuary and statistician
1986	Gordon Moyes	AM	Politician
1985	Sir Ian Turbott	AO, CMG, CVO	Businessman, Chancellor of Western Sydney University
1984	Prof Peter Rowe		Sir Lorimer Dods Professor, University of Sydney, Director of the Children's Medical Research Institute
1983	Bobby Limb	OBE	Entertainer
1982	Alan Davidson	MBE	Cricketer
1981	Dr Bradney W Norington		
1980	Jim Lees	QPM	Police Commissioner
1979	Neil McLeod		
1978	Sir Zelman Cowen	AK, GCMG	Governor General
1977	Gary O'Callaghan	MBE	Radio presenter
1976	Malcolm Fraser		Prime Minister
1975 joint winners	Major General Alan Stretton	AO, CBE	Head of National Disasters Organisation (Cyclone Tracy relief efforts)
1975 joint winners	John Cornforth	CBE	Nobel prize winner in Chemistry
1974	Sir John Kerr	AC, KCMG	Governor General
1973	Group Captain John Waddy	OBE, DFC	Politician
1972	Dr William McBride	AO, CBE	Gynecologist and obstetrician, (discovered the teratogenicity of thalidomide)
1971	William McMahon		Prime Minister
1970	Vincent Charles Fairfax		Boy Scouts
1969	W.M. Leonard		Legacy Australia
1968	Lord Casey	GCMG, CH, DSO, MC, PC	Governor General
1967	Sir Lorimer Dods	LVO	Children's health care
1966	Lieutenant Roden Cutler	VC, CBE	Governor of New South Wales
1965	Bill Northam		Olympic sailor
1964	Robert Menzies	CH	Prime Minister
1963	Leslie James Herron		Chief justice of the Supreme Court of New South Wales
1962	Captain Sir Norman Gregg	MC	Ophthalmologist
1961	Captain Adrian Curlewis		Judge
1960	Colin Delaney	CVO, CBE, QPM	NSW Police Commissioner
1959	Joseph Cahill		Premier of New South Wales
1958	Harry Jensen		Politician
1957	Sir Edward Hallstrom		Businessman and philanthropist

== See also ==
Australian Mother of the Year Award
