= Jim Lees =

Australian police officer (1920-2004)

Jim Lees QPM

15th Commissioner of the New South Wales Police
- In office 17 October 1979 – 29 December 1981
- Preceded by: Mervyn Wood
- Succeeded by: Cecil Abbott

Personal details
- Born: 18 August 1920 Hornsby, New South Wales
- Died: 3 September 2004 (aged 84) Waitara, New South Wales
- Spouse: Norma
- Education: Hurlstone Agricultural High School

James Travers Lees, QPM (18 August 1920 – 3 September 2004) was the Commissioner of the New South Wales Police from 17 October 1979 to 29 December 1981.

== Private life ==
Lees was born in 1920 at Hornsby, New South Wales, and went on to attend the Hurlstone Agricultural High School. He had initially wanted to be a farmer but found that he was not suited for a life on the land. Lees married his wife Norma in October 1944. They went on to have a family with children Sue, John and Peter. Lees also taught a Sunday School and was heavily involved with his church. He also established the Police Christian Fellowship.

Lees died on 2 September 2004 at the age of 84. His funeral was attended by incumbent Police Commissioner Ken Moroney as well as former Police Commissioners Cec Abbott, John Avery and Tony Lauer.

== Police career ==
After giving up on farming Lees accepted as a cadet in the New South Wales Police Force at the age of 17 in 1936. Within six months he was made a constable and began to rise through the ranks of the force.

In 1976 Lees became Assistant Police Commissioner and was appointed Commissioner in October 1979. As well as receiving 12 New South Wales Police commendations he also received the Queen's Police Medal in 1976, the Queen Elizabeth II Silver Jubilee Medal in 1977, the National Medal also in 1977, and the honour of receiving the Australian Father of the Year award in 1981.

Police appointments
Preceded by Mervyn Wood	Commissioner of the New South Wales Police; 1979–1981	Succeeded by Cecil Abbott
