= Ken Moroney =

Australian police officer (born 1945)

Kenneth Moroney AO, APM

19th Commissioner of the New South Wales Police
- In office 29 May 2002 – 31 August 2007
- Preceded by: Peter Ryan
- Succeeded by: Andrew Scipione

Personal details
- Born: Kenneth Edward Moroney; 15 September 1945 (age 81) Glebe, New South Wales, Australia
- Spouse: Bev (m. 1968; died 2015)
- Children: 3
- Education: Macquarie University

Kenneth Edward Moroney, AO, APM (born 15 September 1945) is an Australian former police officer who served as the Commissioner of the New South Wales Police Force from 2002 until 2007.

== Personal life ==
Born in the inner-Sydney suburb of Glebe, New South Wales, Moroney moved with his family to the south-western suburb of Villawood as a child in the 1950s. He completed his schooling at De La Salle, Bankstown.

Moroney married his wife Bev on 1 June 1968. She died on 24 May 2015 after a long illness. Two of their three sons followed Moroney into the police force. One is a senior sergeant at Green Valley, New South Wales in Sydney and another is a detective senior constable at the Counter-Terrorism Co-ordination Command.

== Career ==
Moroney joined the New South Wales Police Force in 1965 as a probationary constable with the No 22 Division in Liverpool, New South Wales. In 1973, he undertook a variety of general duty command roles in regional stations at Lismore, Coraki and West Wyalong, before being promoted to senior constable in 1974 and then sergeant in 1981.

In 1987, Moroney was promoted to superintendent and was the director of recruitment and constable development at the New South Wales Police Academy in Goulburn. In 1990 he was appointed chief-of-staff to Police Commissioner John Avery and then Tony Lauer. In 1997 he was given the job of City East region commander. Five years later he was appointed a senior deputy commissioner. He replaced Peter Ryan as Police Commissioner in 2002, having been selected for the position by the New South Wales Premier, Bob Carr.

As Police Commissioner, Moroney worked under four police ministers: Michael Costa (2001–2003), John Watkins (2003–2005), Carl Scully (2005–2006) and David Campbell (2007–2008).

== Qualifications ==
Moroney's qualifications include a Master of Arts degree and a Graduate Diploma in Management from Macquarie University and a Diploma in Justice Administration from Charles Sturt University. He also graduated from the FBI Academy, Quantico, Virginia.

== Honours and awards ==

Officer of the Order of Australia (AO)	13 June 2011, "service to policing and law enforcement as Commissioner of Police in New South Wales, particularly through implementing reforms to reduce crime and increase public confidence; and for contributions to national security issues".
Australian Police Medal (APM)	1992 "For distinguished police service".
National Medal with 2 Rosettes	1981 and 1999.

Moroney was awarded three New South Wales Police Force Commissioner's Commendations for Service, he is a recipient of the New South Wales Police Medal and the New South Wales Police Olympic Citation.

In November, 2015 Moroney was also inducted as a Life Member of NSW Police Legacy. He was also awarded an Honorary Doctorate from Charles Sturt University.

In 2018 Moroney was elected as a Fellow of the Royal Society of New South Wales and in January 2019 was gazetted as such by the then-Governor of New South Wales, David Hurley, in the New South Wales Government Gazette.

== Retirement ==
Moroney retired on 31 August 2007. Long-standing Deputy Commissioner Andrew Scipione became the new Police Commissioner effective from 1 September 2007. Moroney is the Director of a company called Nemesis Consultancy Group, leading investigations around the world.

Police appointments
Preceded by Peter Ryan	Commissioner of the New South Wales Police; 2002–2007	Succeeded by Andrew Scipione
