= Adrienne Ryan =

British politician (born 1960)

Adrienne Margaret Ryan (née Butterworth; born 19 October 1960 in Skipton, Yorkshire) is a former Liberal councillor and mayor (2004–5) of Ku-ring-gai Council in Sydney, Australia.

== Background ==
Ryan has an honours degree in politics and international relations from Reading University in the United Kingdom. She was a police officer in London for a period of time, being involved in the Brixton riots and Notting Hill race riots in the 1980s.

She and her two daughters moved to Sydney in 1997 when her husband became the New South Wales Police Commissioner. In May 2005, Ryan moved to the Sydney suburb of Wahroonga after separating from her husband, relocating in 2017. In the mid-2010s she divided her time between Sydney and London, studied law through the University of Law, Bloomsbury. In 2014, she was called to the bar at The Honourable Society of The Middle Temple. She was a Harmsworth Scholar of the Middle Temple.

== Personal ==
Ryan was married to former Commissioner of the New South Wales Police Peter Ryan. They divorced in 2011 after an extended separation.

Ryan has two daughters but had multiple miscarriages. In 2000, she published a book called A Silent Love (ISBN 1569245436) about the impact of miscarriage and stillbirth.

== Surveillance ==
In 2012, it was revealed that Ryan and her husband had been placed under surveillance in mid-December 1999 by the Special Crime and Internal Affairs (SCIA) branch of NSW Police. An undercover agent was told by his supervisor that the head of SCIA, assistant commissioner Mal Brammer, wanted him to watch the Ryans to find out who they met and if they were talking shop in case of a "security leak" when they went for a customary drink together after work at a bar near police headquarters. Nothing untoward was found about the Ryans' behaviour, and surveillance was ended in January 2000 with no further action.

Civic offices
Preceded by Ian Cross	Mayor of Ku-ring-gai; 2004 – 2005	Succeeded by Elaine Malicki
