= Avery Building =

Headquarters of the New South Wales Police Force (c. 1970–2004)

Coordinates: 33°52′32″S 151°12′46″E

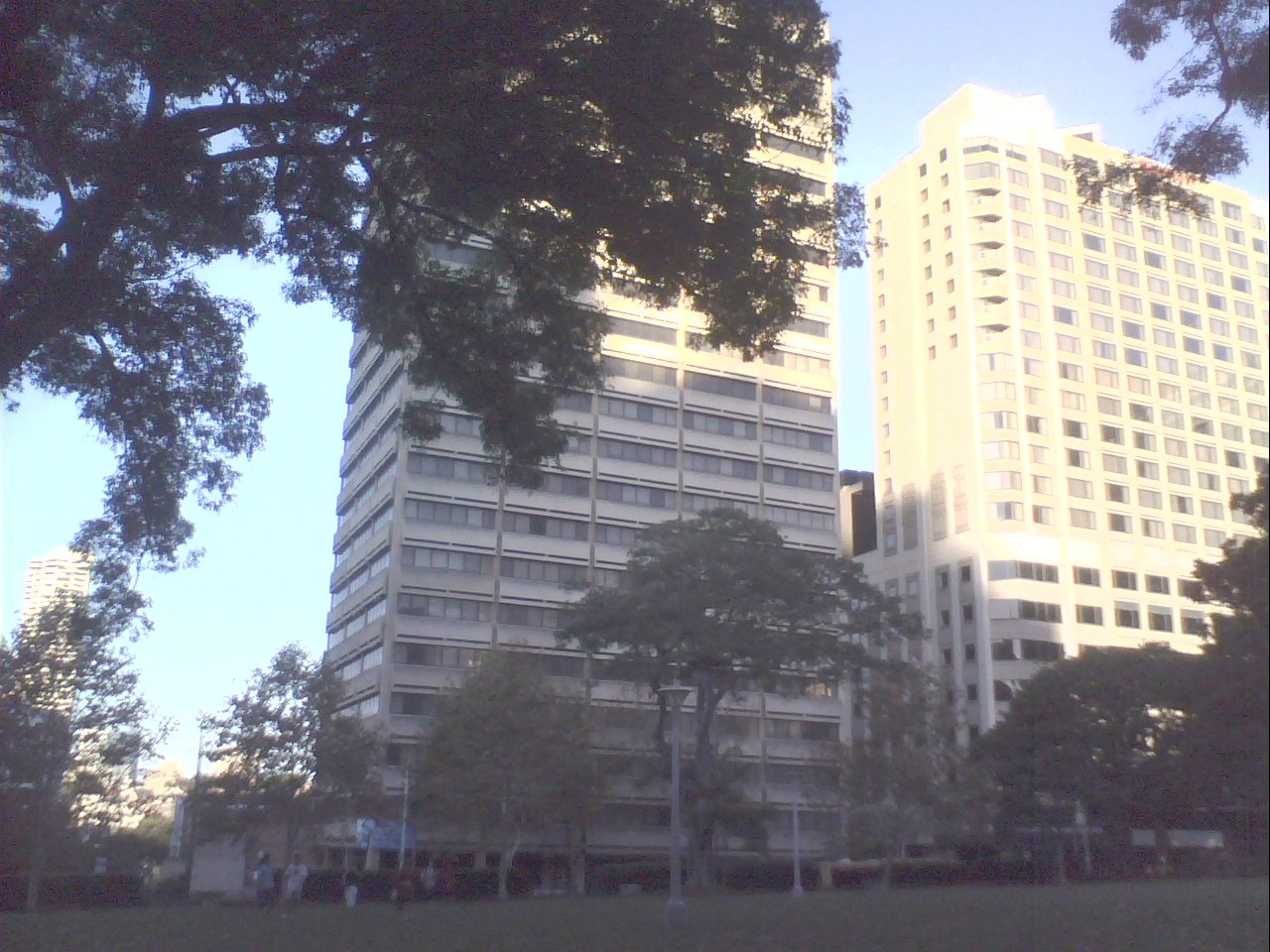
The former Avery Building at centre of picture seen in College Street, Sydney, in 2007

The Avery Building was the headquarters of the New South Wales Police Force from the 1970s until 2004, when a new headquarters building was opened at Parramatta in conjunction with police executive offices located in Elizabeth Street, Sydney. The Avery Building was named after long-serving Police Commissioner John Keith Avery, who led the organisation from 1984 to 1991, after his retirement. The building is a tall white structure, about 20 stories tall, located on College Street, Darlinghurst overlooking Hyde Park. The library at the New South Wales Police College has been named The J.K. Avery Resource Centre in recognition of former Commissioner Avery.

Since the New South Wales Police vacated the Avery Building it remained vacant for several years. In May 2007 it was announced that it would be converted into apartments. The development application was approved by the City of Sydney Council in December 2007 - DA 2007/1548. The building will contain 87 residences in a mix of 1, 2, and 3+ bedroom apartments, and is being marketed as "The Residence, Hyde Park".

The architect of the redesign is Scott Carver Architects. The development was featured in the March 2009 edition of Belle magazine.
