= Mr Sin =

Mr Sin may refer to:

- Mr Sin, a fictional character in the Doctor Who serial The Talons of Weng-Chiang
- Abe Saffron (1919–2006), Australian criminal
