= Penrith Selective High School =

Location
- Penrith, Western Sydney, New South Wales; Australia; 33°45′23″S 150°42′23″E

Information
- Former names: Penrith High School (1950–2011); Penrith Academically Selective High School (2011–2016)
- Type: Public co-educational academically selective secondary day school
- Motto: Latin: Altiora Peto (Striving for the highest)
- Established: 1950; 76 years ago
- Educational authority: NSW Department of Education
- Principal: Jaclyn Cush
- Enrolment: 922 (2018)
- Campus type: Suburban
- Colours: Sky blue, grey, yellow, black, white, and royal blue
- Website: penrith-h.schools.nsw.gov.au

Penrith Selective High School (PSHS) is a public co-educational academically selective secondary day school, located in Penrith, in Western Sydney, New South Wales, Australia. Established in 1950 and operated by the NSW Department of Education, the school caters for approximately 925 students from Year 7 to Year 12.

Penrith Selective High School has consistently performed among the top schools in the Higher School Certificate (HSC). In 2025, the school achieved its highest-ever ranking of 17th in New South Wales, with a median ATAR of 93.9.

The school also ranks well nationally, consistently placing amongst the top 15 to 20 schools in Australia based on results of the National Assessment Program (NAPLAN), a series of nationally administered tests aimed at measuring student's ability in reading, writing, spelling, grammar and punctuation, and numeracy.

== History ==
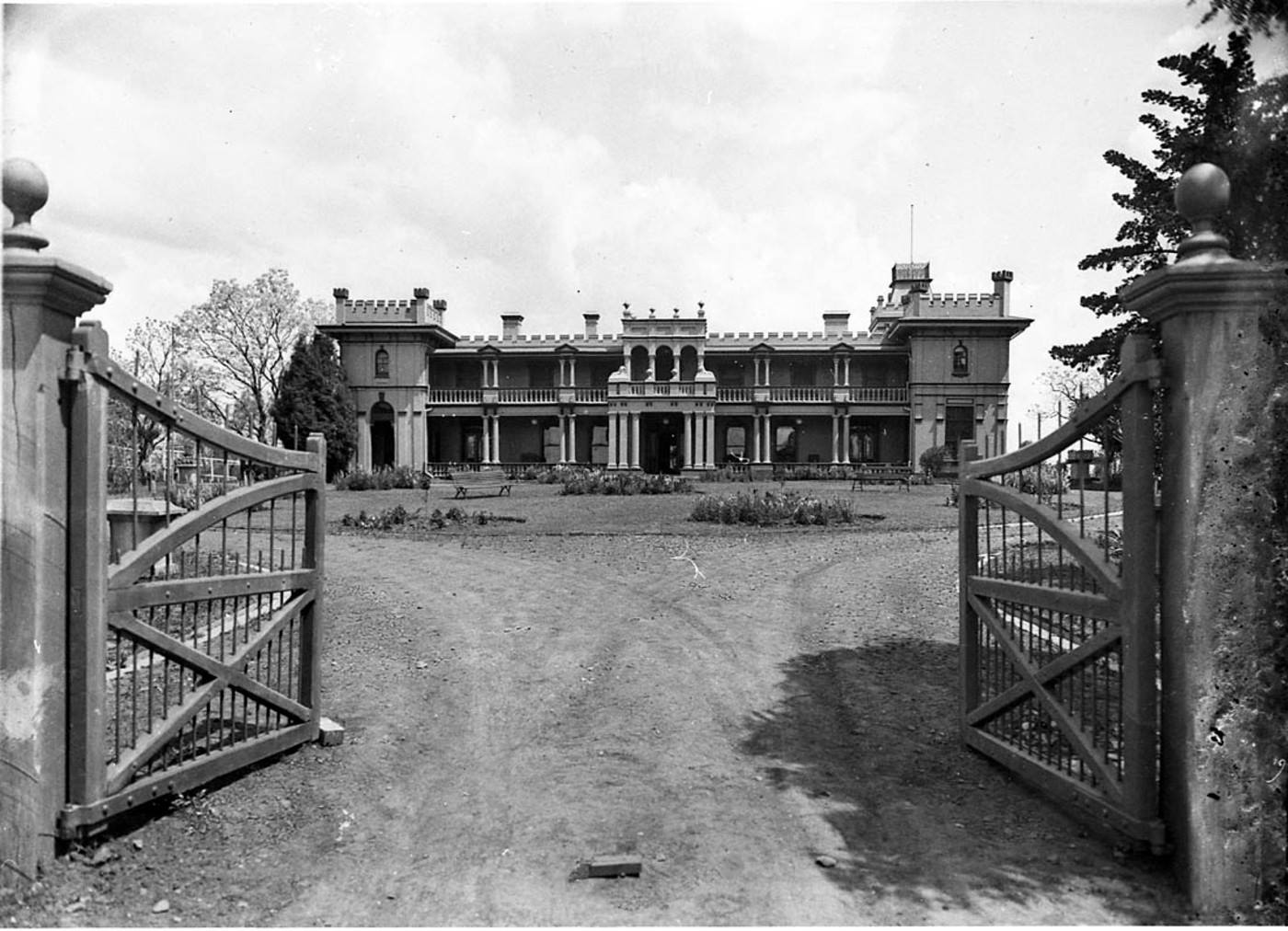
The Towers, High Street, Penrith. Built from 1880s. Demolished 1940.

Penrith Selective High School was first opened in the 1930s as an intermediate school on the land adjacent to its current location (now Penrith Public School). The school's location was then occupied by a mansion known as The Towers. During the 1940s, the mansion and the land was sold to the Department of Education, who demolished the mansion and built Penrith High School, which was officially established in 1950. The school became academically selective in 1989.

Two of the original foundations of the mansion have been preserved and remain in the school grounds. Additionally, the original plaque commemorating the opening of Penrith Intermediate School has been transferred into the present school grounds, where it currently resides in the school's archives. In commemoration of The Towers mansion, the annual school magazine goes by the same name.

== Enrolment ==
The students of Penrith Selective High School come from an area extending from the Blue Mountains to North Sydney, from the Hawkesbury District to Luddenham. The school has seen significant intake from the City of Blacktown.

== Facilities ==
The school has a gymnasium, a field with multi-sport goal posts (soccer and rugby, although contact sport is strictly prohibited), a smaller field with portable hockey goal posts, and two basketball courts. It also has five computer labs, an extensive two-storey library, a large space for creative and performing arts, numerous classrooms with equipment and materials dedicated to specific faculties, and a school hall which is part of the original school structure, built in the early 1950s. The hall can accommodate approximately 450 seated guests, usually used for official school functions, performing arts exhibitions, and information evenings. The Penrith Selective High School Parents and Citizens Association (P&C) operates a school canteen, from which all proceeds go towards improving the educational experience of PSHS students.

== House system ==
The school has a house system named after four significant Australian explorers: Blaxland, Lawson, Mitchell, and Wentworth. These houses are named after Gregory Blaxland, William Lawson and William Wentworth, who began their 1813 expedition from Blaxland's farm at Emu Plains to cross the Blue Mountains, and Thomas Mitchell, associated with Mitchell's Pass at Glenbrook, constructed in 1833 near the historic Lennox Bridge.

Each house is led by a male and female Captain (Year 11) and Vice-Captain (Year 10), who coordinate house meetings and organise events. Throughout the year, houses compete in sporting, academic, cultural and co-curricular events for points, with the overall winning house recognised at the end of each year.

== Notable people ==
- Linda Burney – former Member of the New South Wales Parliament for Canterbury, and current Member of the Australian Parliament for Barton
- Joyce Fardell – former teacher librarian
- Tony Lauer APM – former Commissioner of the New South Wales Police
- Grigor Taylor – actor, Matlock Police, Silent Number and Glenview High
- Ray Watson AM – judge who reformed family law to create no-fault divorce
- Penelope Wensley AC – former Governor of Queensland
- Richard Wilson – actor, The Proposition and Clubland
- Gary McGinnis – Scottish former Football player, Celtic FC, Dundee United

== See also ==
- List of government schools in New South Wales
- List of selective high schools in New South Wales
