= Andrew Scipione =

British police officer (born 1958)

Andrew Scipione AO, APM

Commissioner of the New South Wales Police Force
- In office 31 August 2007 – 31 March 2017
- Preceded by: Ken Moroney
- Succeeded by: Mick Fuller

Personal details
- Born: 31 March 1958 (age 68) London, England
- Spouse: Joy
- Children: 3
- Education: Macquarie University

Andrew Phillip Scipione, AO, APM (born 31 March 1958) is a former police officer who served as Commissioner of the New South Wales Police Force, succeeding Ken Moroney on 31 August 2007. He retired from the New South Wales Police Force on 31 March 2017. He was farewelled with a guard of honour and was marched out by 100 of his fellow officers. His replacement as commissioner was Mick Fuller.

== Personal ==
Scipione was born in London, England, on 31 March 1958 to an Irish mother and an Italian father. He immigrated to Australia with his family as an infant. He attended Padstow North Public School in South-West Sydney and left his high-school, Sir Joseph Banks High School, at the age of 14 due to his father's death. His first job after he left school was as an electrician's apprentice in Revesby.

Scipione is married to Joy, with whom he has three children. Their two sons, Ben and Jonathon, are New South Wales police officers, and their daughter Emma is a teacher. Scipione is a devout Baptist who often speaks of his commitment to reducing alcohol fuelled-violence and domestic violence.

== Career ==
Scipione joined the Australian Bureau of Customs in 1978 before moving to the New South Wales Police Force in 1980. He worked in a number of sections, including a secondment to the National Crime Authority of Australia in 1985, with Bankstown detectives, the Special Gaming Squad, Hurstville and Sydney City general duties. In 1992, Scipione became the Operations Controller of the Joint Technical Services Group (JTSG), in 1995 the Commander of the Special Technical Investigation Branch (STIB), in 1998 the Chief of Staff to then Police Commissioner Peter Ryan, in 2001 the Commander of Special Crime & Internal Affairs. Scipione was promoted to Deputy Commissioner in 2002 having served as both the Deputy Commissioner Field Operations and Specialist Operations.

Scipione holds a master's degree in Management from Macquarie University. He is a graduate of the FBI National Executive Institute (2004). He is a Fellow of the Australian Institute of Management and a member of the Australian Institute of Company Directors. He has an Honorary Doctorate from the University of Western Sydney.

Scipione played a crucial role as the head of the New South Wales Police Force for APEC Australia 2007 leaders week held in Sydney and the World Youth Day 2008 held in Sydney during July 2008.

In 2009, Scipione introduced the first official police Bible, saying "Our officers have a great deal of respect for our chaplains, and what better way to build on that relationship than to share the gospel?"

Scipione extended his term as commissioner at the request of Premier Mike Baird, and was expected to remain until July 2017. However, in February 2017 Scipione announced he would retire earlier. Scipione retired from the Police Force on 31 March 2017. On 30 March it was announced that Assistant Commissioner Mick Fuller would replace him as NSW Police Commissioner.

== Honours and awards ==

Officer of the Order of Australia (AO)	13 June 2016, "For distinguished service to law enforcement as Commissioner of Police in New South Wales, through advancing the professionalism of policing and leadership of international investigations and counter terrorism activities.".
Australian Police Medal (APM)	2003 Australia Day Honours
National Police Service Medal	
National Medal & 1 Rosettes	

Scipione was awarded the National Medal on 8 November 1996, and the Australian Police Medal (APM) on 26 January 2003.

In addition to awards under the Australian Honours and Awards framework, he also holds a range of internal New South Wales Police Force awards, namely: NSW Police Commissioners Commendation and bar, NSW Police Medal with 1st, 2nd, 3rd & 4th clasps; NSWPF Commissioners Unit Citation & star, NSWPF Commissioners Olympic Citation and NSWPF Commissioners Sesquicentenary Citation.

Police appointments
Preceded by Ken Moroney	Commissioner of the New South Wales Police Force; 2007–2017	Succeeded by Mick Fuller
