= Karen Webb =

Australian police officer

Karen Webb APM
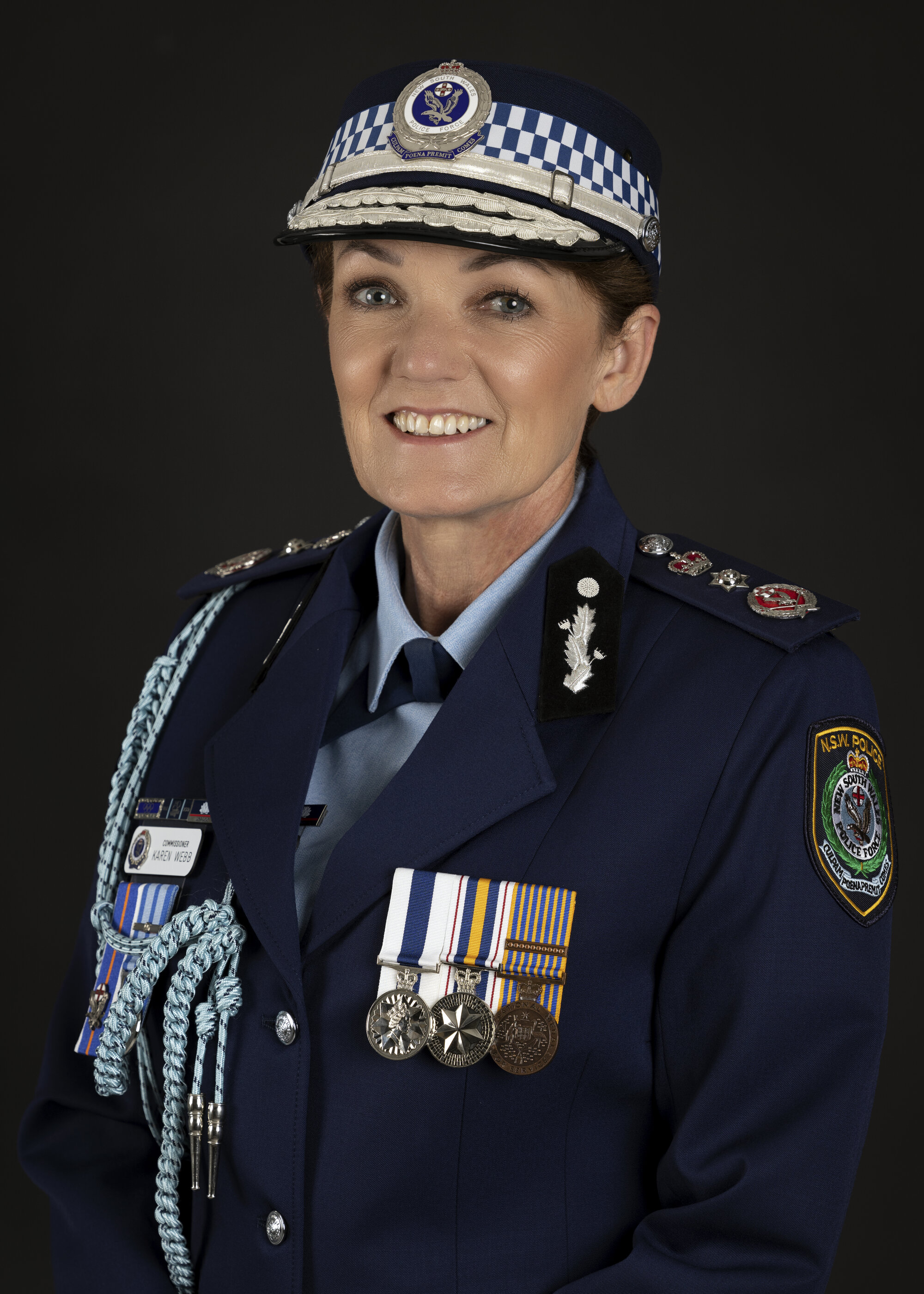
- Official portrait, 2022

Commissioner of the New South Wales Police Force
- In office 1 February 2022 – 6 June 2025
- Preceded by: Mick Fuller
- Succeeded by: Mal Lanyon

Personal details
- Born: Karen Leanne Keefe; 25 December 1969 (age 56) Boorowa, New South Wales, Australia
- Children: Two

Karen Leanne Webb, APM (née Keefe; born 25 December 1969) is an Australian former police officer, who replaced Mick Fuller as the Commissioner of the New South Wales Police Force in February 2022. Webb was the first woman appointed to this office. She left the position on 6 June 2025.

== Early life and career ==
Webb was born and raised in Boorowa in the south western slopes of New South Wales, and attended Boorowa Central School.

Webb joined NSW Police in 1987 and previously was responsible for traffic and highway patrol and public transport. She joined the Castle Hill Police Station, in the 1990s at a time when 10% of police officers were women, which grew to 35% as at 2021. Webb stated in 2021 that she "look[s] forward to growing our diversity and inclusion in the organisation".

Webb was the first woman to lead Traffic and Highway Patrol, since 2020. She was promoted in 2017 to assistant commissioner, and subsequently moved to deputy commissioner in July 2021. She has been a Board Member of NSW Police Legacy since 2018, and Vice-Patron since 2022.

On 1 February 2022, Webb was formally appointed Commissioner of the New South Wales Police Force. Previous police commissioner ceremonies were traditionally held at Government House in Sydney, but Webb chose to accept her appointment in her alma mater at Boorowa Central School.

Webb set up the Domestic and Family Violence Registry.

Webb was criticised for her response to the killing of Jesse Baird and Luke Davies at the hands of an ex-NSW Police officer in February 2024, calling it a "crime of passion".

Following the Bondi Junction stabbings in April 2024, Webb implemented stricter knife laws in NSW. She was accused of misconduct for revealing the name of a victim without the family's consent, but was cleared of any misconduct.

In August 2024, Webb was accused of using tax-payer funds to buy over 100 bottles, most to be given as gifts. Webb denied the allegations, saying that only 24 had been purchased and she had not drunk any herself. The LECC later accused her of having a conflict of interest with the gin seller, which she admitted to, although said that she was unaware at first because she had only continued to use the same supplier as the previous commissioner. She later outlawed the practice to ensure the mistake will not be repeated. In April 2026 the LECC cleared Webb of any misconduct regarding the gifting of gin.

In November 2024, Webb gave entry-level police offers in NSW a 19% pay rise over four years, and allowed them to work part time.

Webb has called for less police intervention in cases of mental health incidents when there is no immediate danger, saying that mental health professionals are better suited to respond to such incidents.

In 2025 Webb was widely criticised for her handling of the death of Clare Nowland, where her statement on the matter did not mention that she was tasered and only that she had "sustained injuries during an interaction with police."

In May 2025, police minister Yasmin Catley announced that Webb intended to step down as police commissioner, and would be retiring by the end of September after 38 years in the force. After leaving the position of commissioner on 6 June 2025, she took up a role of special advisor on domestic violence to the NSW government.

On 24 September 2025, the government announced that deputy commissioner Mal Lanyon will become the next police commissioner.

== Honours and achievements ==
Webb was awarded the Australian Police Medal in the 2015 Australia Day Honours.

Police appointments
Preceded by Mick Fuller	Commissioner of the New South Wales Police Force; 2022–2025	Succeeded by Mal Lanyon
