= Cecil Abbott =

Australian law enforcement official

Cecil Abbott AO, QPM

16th Commissioner of the New South Wales Police
- In office 30 December 1981 – 7 August 1984
- Preceded by: Jim Lees
- Succeeded by: John Keith Avery

Personal details
- Born: 7 August 1924 Hurstville, New South Wales
- Died: 12 March 2014 (aged 89) Hurstville, New South Wales
- Spouse: Edna
- Education: Sydney Technical High School
- Relatives: Les Abbott (brother)

Cecil Roy "Cec" Abbott, AO, QPM (7 August 1924 – 12 March 2014) was the Commissioner of the New South Wales Police in Australia from 30 December 1981 to 7 August 1984.

== Private life ==
Cecil Roy Abbot was born in Hurstville on 7 August 1924 and grew up in Hurstville. He married Margaret Edna Robinson on 15 February 1947. They had one son, Paul, who also became a police officer. Abbott died in St George Hospital in Kogarah on 12 March 2014. His funeral was held in Penshurst, New South Wales. Police Commissioner Andrew Scipione attended and described Abbott as a "man of the utmost integrity".

== Police career ==
Abbott became a police cadet in 1941 and graduated to the New South Wales Police Force in 1945. By 1974 he was an inspector at Hurstville. He climbed further through the ranks to be Commissioner of Police for the New South Wales Police and the most powerful police officer in the State of New South Wales.

== Honours ==
- On 31 December 1976, he was awarded the Queen's Police Medal (QPM) "In recognition for services to the New South Wales Police".
- On 11 June 1982 he was awarded the National Medal.
- On 26 January 1985 he was appointed an Officer of the Order of Australia (AO) for "Public service particularly with the New South Wales Police Force".

Police appointments
| Preceded by Jim Lees | Commissioner of the New South Wales Police; 1981–1984 | Succeeded by John Keith Avery |
