= Royal Commission into the New South Wales Police Service =

Investigation from 1995 to 1997 into corruption in the New South Wales Police

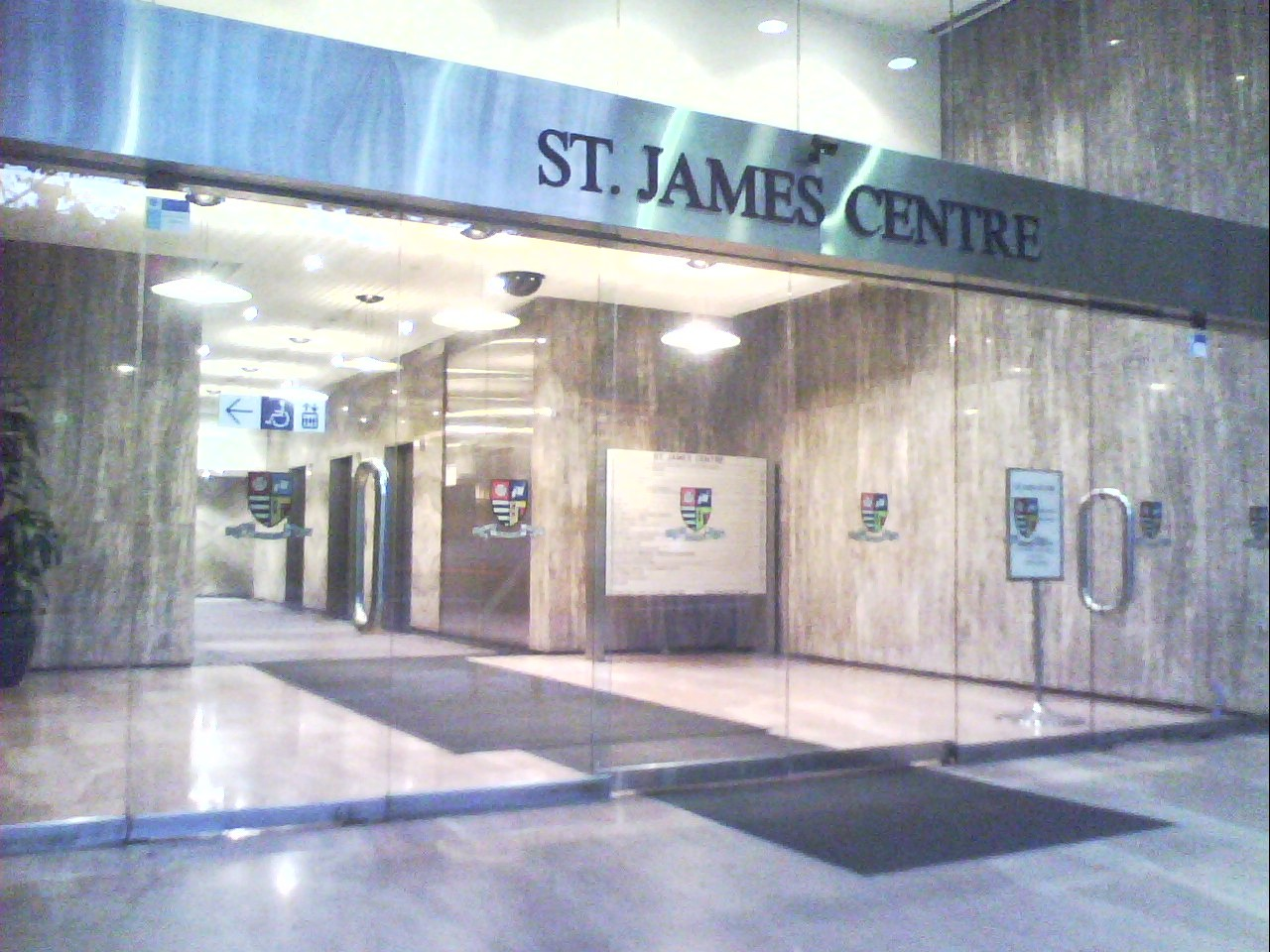
- The St. James Centre in Elizabeth Street, Sydney where the Royal Commission hearings were held.
- Date: 1994–1997
- Duration: 3 years
- Location: Sydney, Australia
- Also known as: Wood Royal Commission
- Commissioner: Justice James Roland Wood

The Royal Commission into the New South Wales Police Service, also known as the Wood Royal Commission, was a royal commission held in the State of New South Wales, Australia between 1994 and 1997. The Royal Commissioner was Justice James Roland Wood. The terms of reference were to determine the existence and extent of corruption within the New South Wales Police; specifically, it sought to determine whether corruption and misconduct were "systemic and entrenched" within the service, and to advise on the process to address such a problem.

In 1995, the Commission received letters patent widening the terms of reference to include investigating the activities of organised paedophile networks in New South Wales, the suitability of care arrangements for at-risk minors and the effectiveness of police guidelines for the investigation of sex-offences against minors.

== Investigations and powers ==
The Commission was granted considerable powers, even by the standards of a royal commission; in addition to the usual power to compel attendance, the giving of evidence and the production of documents and self-certification of warrants for electronic surveillance, bugs and telephone intercepts. Commissioned officers were permitted to carry firearms and were conferred the powers of a constable of the NSW Police Service. Most notably, lying to or misleading the Commission was an offence carrying a sentence of up to six months imprisonment.

In contrast to the usual structure of royal commissions, which are staffed primarily by lawyers and administrators, the Commission had three investigation teams composed of lawyers, accountants, investigators and current and former officers from every Australian and common-law jurisdiction excepting New South Wales. The Commission also acquired the equipment and expertise so that it possessed the sophisticated covert surveillance capabilities it would need to effectively monitor the activities of groups of corrupt police officers and organised criminals.

By 1995, the Commission had uncovered hundreds of instances of bribery, money laundering, drug trafficking, fabrication of evidence, destruction of evidence, fraud and serious assaults in just the detective division of the Kings Cross patrol. Participation in misconduct was universal in the detective division of the Kings Cross patrol, and the senior levels of the branch had detective sergeants and the chief detective in a permanent corrupt relationship with major drug traffickers and the local criminal milieu. The Kings Cross detectives received payments akin to a "rent" from individuals like Bill Bayeh, Steve Hardas and "Fat" George; the payments totalled thousands of dollars per week, collected by Sergeant Trevor Haken and shared amongst the six detective sergeants and the chief detective (Graham "Chook" Fowler). This corrupt practice was known in police circles as "the laugh".

In 1994, Trevor Haken was summonsed for an examination at the New South Wales Crime Commission. They had become aware of his relationship with drug traffickers and his corrupt practices. The Wood Royal Commission had assessed Haken as being the individual most likely to co-operate with the Commission in a covert capacity, and took the opportunity to put to Haken an offer to work with the Commission. He agreed and he was instructed by the Commission to simply carry on as normal; his car was fitted out with bugs to record video and audio and his phones were permanently tapped. Over the following six months, Haken continued to collect payments from traffickers, distribute them to the other corrupt detectives and collected an enormous amount of intelligence and data for the Commission.

In 1995, the Commission scheduled a hearing about the Kings Cross patrol. It summonsed the detective sergeants and Chook Fowler and asked them whether they had ever accepted or asked for a bribe. They emphatically denied they had. Having these denials on the record, the Commission then played video footage and audio recordings from the bugs in Trevor Haken's car. The recordings showed very clearly the handing over of large amounts of cash and discussion of bribes and corrupt activities. Following this bombshell hearing, resistance to the work of the Commission from the police service and media crumbled and they were inundated with calls from serving officers seeking to determine whether they could make a deal.

The next day, Commissioner Wood declared a conditional amnesty for disclosures of corruption or misconduct by serving officers. The Commissioner emphasised that the goal of the inquiry was to ascertain the prevalence and nature of corruption in the NSW Police and advise on the reforms necessary to address the problem. Removing corrupt officers who would simultaneously provide a full account of their conduct and end their ability to engage in further corrupt practices. It would allow the NSW Police to obtain a large amount of information that would not otherwise come out in criminal proceedings, and it would serve as a clean break for the NSW Police Service.

In addition to the Kings Cross hearings, hundreds of police officers were compelled to resign as evidence of wrongdoing and misconduct was brought to light. Specialist officers from the Fraud Enforcement Agency, Northwest Regional Crime Squad and Drug Squad were implicated in particularly serious abuses and criminality. A large number of generalist, uniform officers also left the service due to the disclosure of misconduct.

== Paedophilia/pederasty enquiry ==
In 1995, the Independent Commission Against Corruption referred a matter to the commission regarding the possibility of collusion between organised paedophile networks with members from the legal profession, media and political establishment, and the senior ranks of the NSW Police Service and judiciary. For the purposes of this article, and in the Commission Report Volume 4, the term paedophile is used as an umbrella for sexual offences and behaviours that include paedophilia, pederasty and hebephilia.

The allegation of the existence of this conspiracy was made by Colin Fisk, a convicted sex offender and member of such a network; the background to this allegation was his arrest, along with Detective Larry Churchill, for child pornography and drug offences. Fisk alleged the existence of a vast network of prominent individuals from the legal profession, media, political establishment and medical profession who were paedophiles/pederasts and were colluding with senior ranks of the police service to protect its members from prosecution.

In pursuing this term of reference, the Commission investigated the activities of the particular pederastic/hebephilic network of which Fisk was a member, and its relationship with a group of corrupt NSW Police Service detectives. The network operated as a mutual syndicate and was designed to facilitate the distribution of child pornography, the procuring and sharing of underage sexual partners by members, investment in property such as an underage male brothel in Surry Hills and a pooling of resources and information for the purposes of evading law enforcement and maintaining access to illicit markets. Syndicate members also carried on an amphetamine-trafficking enterprise to raise money to help with the significant expense imposed by the requirement to pay bribes, and the high price of illicit materials and services.

The relationship between the network and the group of corrupt detectives was extensive and multifaceted, including regular bribe payments to the detectives in exchange for advance warning of law enforcement scrutiny, consignment of large amounts of methamphetamine to the network members on a profit-sharing basis and the planning of insurance frauds and financial crimes. The detective closest to the network, Larry Churchill, also shared some of the hebephilic tendencies of the network members.

The commission found that the syndicates were effective and efficient in protecting the perpetrators from law enforcement scrutiny and facilitating their criminal activities, and there had been a corrupt relationship between the Fisk syndicate and a group of corrupt officers led by Larry Churchill. The inquiry also conceded that there were probably other such networks and corrupt dealings unknown to them but based on the extensive evidence provided by large numbers of sex-offenders, victims and law enforcement officers, it felt able to put that aside and concentrate on its instruction to examine police procedure and care arrangements for minors.

It was highly critical of police, prosecutors and public servants in their approach to the prosecution of sex offences against minors and their lack of specialist police resources and clear guidelines. The commission made comprehensive recommendations for the reform of care arrangements and police and public service procedures in dealing with child victims of sexual offences.

However, the inquiry debunked the most sensational allegations made by Fisk and was emphatic that there was no compelling evidence for the existence of a large network of prominent professionals with paedophile tendencies and a criminal bargain with senior officers of the police service to protect them from prosecution.

== Consequences and reform ==
When the inquiry was first set up, Police Commissioner Tony Lauer stated that corruption in the New South Wales Police was not systemic or entrenched; in fact, he provided a map to the Commission purporting to show areas which were guaranteed to be free from any systemic misconduct. The Kings Cross patrol, the most egregious participant in corruption and criminality, was labelled by the Lauer document as being entirely free from corruption.

The sensational revelations coming out of the Commission hearings, and his emphatic assertion that corruption was a non-issue, made Lauer's position as Commissioner untenable. He resigned shortly after the publication of the Commission initial report.

Following the Commission hearings, the New South Wales Government felt that the senior ranks of the NSW Police Service were too compromised by personal misconduct, or personal ties to corrupt officers, for any officer to be expected to navigate the reform of the service and implement decisions in the face of bitter opposition from colleagues and former colleagues. Peter Ryan was recruited from the United Kingdom and successfully implemented many of the recommendations of the commission, including drug testing for serving officers, integrity testing and more thorough supervision. The government also undertook a series of legislative changes, which resulted in the majority of recommendations being consolidated in statute. These recommendations included the questioning and investigation procedures that followed arrest. In addition to reforms of the police service, the facilities, staff and equipment of the Commission formed the nucleus of the Police Integrity Commission; the PIC retained many of the broad powers held by the Wood Royal Commission.

As a result of the Commission, three senior police officers were fired for using mace on an uncooperative thief and child molester, 12 years after the event. While stating there was "no doubt" the Commission purged the police of many corrupt officers, journalist Malcolm Brown also commented that some critics believed this particular action "did no serious harm and only required a word of caution".

The Commission's recommendations included equalisation of the Age of Consent for sex by lowering it from 18 to 16 years for homosexual sex between males, to match the age for homosexual sex between females and for heterosexual sex. Partly because of unsupported but widespread conflation of homosexuality with pederasty at that time, and in the context of lawyer John Marsden's ongoing defamation case against the Seven Network, this recommendation was initially rejected by the New South Wales Government, and it was not until May 2003 that the Age of Consent was equalised at 16 under the Crimes Act 1900.

In response to the Commission's findings of widespread police corruption in the sex industry, the New South Wales Government decriminalised sex work in 1995.

== In popular culture ==
The 2009 and 2010 television series Underbelly: A Tale of Two Cities and Underbelly: The Golden Mile were loosely based on the activities of the NSW police service and the Wood Royal Commission with Terry Clark, Robert Trimbole, "Chook" Fowler, Trevor Haken, Bill Bayeh, George Freeman and Lenny McPherson all portrayed.

== See also ==
- Croatian Six – Croatian-Australians convicted of conspiracy to bomb targets in Sydney
- New South Wales Police Force strip search scandal
