= Death of Clare Nowland =

Australian nonagenarian who died after being Tasered by police

- Date: 17 May 2023
- Location: Cooma, New South Wales, Australia
- Type: Tasering
- Deaths: 1
- Convicted: Senior Constable Kristian White
- Charges: Initially charged with recklessly causing grievous bodily harm, assault occasioning actual bodily harm, and common assault (charges upgraded to manslaughter following Nowland's death)
- Verdict: Guilty
- Convictions: Manslaughter
- Sentence: Two-year community corrections order 425 hours of community service

On 17 May 2023, Clare Nowland, a 95-year-old resident with dementia, was Tasered by New South Wales police at an aged care home in Cooma, Australia. She was hospitalized after she fell and fractured her skull when she received the Taser electric current. She died a week later, on 24 May. The officer who fired the Taser has been suspended and charged with a number of offences. His trial was held in the NSW Supreme Court. On 27 November 2024, the officer, Senior Constable Kristian White, was found guilty of manslaughter. He was sentenced to a two-year community corrections order, including 425 hours of community service.

== Participants ==
=== Clare Nowland ===
Nowland was a 95-year-old resident at an aged care home in Cooma. She had dementia and used a walker. Nowland was known for skydiving to celebrate her 80th birthday.

=== Kristian White ===
White was a 33-year-old senior constable with 12 years' experience at the time of the incident.

== Incident ==
In the early hours of 17 May 2023, Nowland obtained a steak knife from the kitchen of the aged care home where she had lived for the previous five years. Staff were unable to retrieve the knife from her, and called the local police. Two officers, White and a female officer, arrived at the home about 4 am, and found Nowland in her room. They called on her to drop the knife, but she walked slowly towards them at a pace of 1 m/min using a walker, carrying and raising the knife. According to The Daily Telegraph, the female police officer allegedly said she could take the knife from Nowland. White allegedly said "no, bugger it" before firing his Taser. White fired his Taser twice, hitting Nowland in the back and the chest. Nowland fell, fracturing her skull. She was taken to Cooma District Hospital where she was given end-of-life care. She died from inoperable brain bleed on 24 May.

== Aftermath ==
On 23 May 2023, White was suspended from duty. On 24 May, hours before Nowland's death, he was charged with recklessly causing grievous bodily harm, assault occasioning actual bodily harm, and common assault. On 29 November, White's charges were upgraded to manslaughter.

On 27 May, a small group of protestors marched on NSW Police headquarters in Parramatta.

Nowland's funeral was held in Cooma on 13 June 2023.

On 21 June, following a freedom of information request by The Sydney Morning Herald, it was discovered that NSW Police media had deliberately withheld advice to the public that White had used a Taser on Nowland. The police statement issued to the public only said Nowland had “sustained injuries during an interaction with police"; NSW Police Commissioner Karen Webb was widely criticised for this decision.

On 3 December 2024, White was officially sacked by the NSW Police Force.

As part of his sentence, White wrote an apology letter to Nowland’s family in which he expressed remorse for his actions.

== Legal proceedings ==
White was due to appear in Cooma Local Court on 5 July 2023, with the court committing to considerable expense in arranging security for the appearance. Unbeknown to the magistrate hearing the matter, the Office of the Director of Public Prosecutions had allowed White to appear via video link, which angered the magistrate. On 7 February 2024, White's lawyer indicated that White would plead not guilty to manslaughter. The other three charges were withdrawn by the prosecution.

White's trial began on 11 November 2024.

Nowland's family has lodged a civil lawsuit against the state of New South Wales seeking undisclosed damages for trespass to the person (assault and battery) and negligence. The matter has been adjourned until late August.

On 27 November 2024, White was found guilty of manslaughter by a jury in a Sydney trial after 20 hours of deliberation. White's bail was extended pending a consideration of the Crown's detention application.

On 28 March 2025, White was sentenced to a two-year community corrections order, including 425 hours of community service, with the condition of not committing another offence. The sentencing judge said the crime fell at the lower end of seriousness for offences of manslaughter.

In July 2025, prosecutors lost an appeal against White’s sentence. The appeal had said that the given sentence was “manifestly inadequate”.
