= Mervyn Wood =

Australian rower and police officer

Mervyn Wood LVO MBE QPM
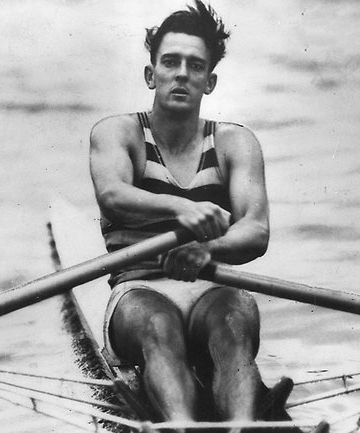
- Wood rowing in 1952

Commissioner of the New South Wales Police
- In office 1 January 1977 – 5 June 1979
- Preceded by: Frederick Hanson
- Succeeded by: Jim Lees

Personal details
- Born: 30 April 1917 Kensington, New South Wales
- Died: 19 August 2006 (aged 89) Sydney, New South Wales

Mervyn Thomas Wood, LVO MBE QPM (30 April 1917 – 19 August 2006) was an Australian rower and police officer. He was an eight-time Australian national sculling champion, four-time Olympian and three-time Olympic medalist. He later rose to become the Commissioner of the New South Wales Police Force.

== Early life and career ==
Wood was the youngest of four children born in Kensington, New South Wales, on 30 April 1917. His father Thomas Wood had emigrated to Australia and entered the Police Force in 1905. Wood grew up in Randwick and attended Sydney Boys High School, graduating in 1934, where he represented his school in rugby union, swimming and most successfully, rowing.

Following high school, Wood became a police cadet and rowed for the New South Wales Police Rowing Club. The police senior eight dominated at state and national championships and was selected in toto represent Australia at the 1936 Summer Olympics in Berlin. At the age of 19 years, Wood appeared in his first Olympics rowing in the three seat of the Australian men's eight. His boat was eliminated in the repechage and did not make the final.

Upon his return, Wood made police constable. After the majority of his crew retired, Wood took up sculling. He worked in the police force in the Criminal Investigation Branch, and in 1944 joined the Royal Australian Air Force as a navigator.

== Rowing ==
Mervyn Wood
Medal record

Representing Australia

Men's rowing

Olympic Games
Gold medal – first place	1948 London	Single sculls
Silver medal – second place	1952 Helsinki	Single sculls
Bronze medal – third place	1956 Melbourne	Double sculls

British Empire (and Commonwealth) Games
Gold medal – first place	1950 Auckland	Single sculls
Gold medal – first place	1950 Auckland	Double sculls
Gold medal – first place	1954 Vancouver	Double sculls
Gold medal – first place	1954 Vancouver	Coxed four
Silver medal – second place	1958 Cardiff	Double sculls

Diamond Challenge Sculls
Gold medal – first place	1948 Henley-on-Thames	Single sculls
Gold medal – first place	1952 Henley-on-Thames	Single sculls

Gold Cup Challenge
Gold medal – first place	1948 Philadelphia	Single sculls
Gold medal – first place	1950 Philadelphia	Single sculls

After the end of the Second World War, Wood won State and National Championships in 1946, 1947 and 1948 and was selected to represent Australia in the single scull at the 1948 Summer Olympics in London. Wood travelled to London ahead of the rest of the team and won the Diamond Challenge Sculls event at the Henley Royal Regatta, beating Bert Bushnell in the final. At the Olympics, Wood won all of his races handily including the final, which he won by 14 seconds. Wood celebrated by smoking his pipe – he was a lifelong smoker who only put aside the habit for the Olympics.

Wood went on to win the national single scull championship a record seven straight times, winning in 1949, 1950, 1951 and 1952. At the 1950 British Empire Games he won the single scull and with compatriot Murray Riley the double scull. As the 1948 Olympic Champion, Wood was awarded the Philadelphia Challenge Cup as the best amateur sculler in the world, which Wood defended in 1950, defeating John B. Kelly Jr. and Antony Rowe in a match race in Philadelphia, Pennsylvania.

Wood represented Australia in the single scull event at the 1952 Summer Olympics in Helsinki, where he was honoured by being selected to carry the Australian flag at the opening ceremony. On the journey to Finland, Wood stopped in England and repeated his victory at the Henley Royal Regatta in the Diamond Challenge Sculls, beating Tony Fox in the final. Wood was a favourite to win the single scull at the Olympics, but lost the final by 1.7 seconds to Yuriy Tyukalov. Although he never offered it as an excuse, as a child, Wood had injured his arm which occasionally caused him distress while rowing including during the summer of 1952. This may have affected his performance at the games, but Wood also faced far stiffer competition than in the 1948 games, which were held shortly after the Second World War, and his main rival Tyukalov would prove to be one of the best oarsmen of his generation.

At the 1954 British Empire and Commonwealth Games in Vancouver, Wood rowed in both the coxless four and the double scull events. The finals were separated by only 45 minutes, and Wood won gold medals in both events.

In 1956 Wood lost the national sculling title to teenager Stuart Mackenzie, who was selected ahead of Wood to represent Australia in the single scull at the 1956 Summer Olympics in Melbourne. But Wood and his partner Riley were selected for the double scull. Among others in the final, Wood and Riley faced the Soviet team that included Yuriy Tyukalov, who had beaten Wood at the 1952 Games. Tyukalov's boat again triumphed, an American boat finished second, and Wood's boat third, giving him a bronze medal at age 39. Wood was again named the flag-bearer, the only Australian to have twice achieved the honour.

Wood's final competition was the 1958 British Empire and Commonwealth Games in Cardiff, where teaming with MacKenzie he won silver in the double scull at age 41.

== Commissioner of Police ==
Following his retirement from rowing, Wood returned full-time to his post in the New South Wales Police Force, eventually becoming the Commissioner in 1977. His double scull partner at the 1956 Olympics, Murray Riley, was also a police officer. After leaving the force, Riley became an international drug smuggler. Wood's link with Riley and the controversy it generated was a factor in causing him to quit as Commissioner in 1979.

Another factor was a document, allegedly prepared by senior police officers, which was given to a number of politicians, and which alluded to a meeting between Wood and an "illegal casino operator", among other things. The then Premier of New South Wales, Neville Wran, started by backing Wood, stating that it would be strange for a Police Commissioner not to know people in the underworld. Once the document surfaced, however, the public backlash forced Wran to take back his support for Wood.

== Awards ==
Wood was appointed Member of the Order of the British Empire (MBE) in the 1957 New Year Honours, in recognition of his outstanding representation in the sphere of Australian amateur sport.

In the 1975 New Year Honours, he was awarded the Queen's Police Medal (QPM).

Wood was appointed a Member (Fourth Class) of the Royal Victorian Order (MVO) in 1977 on the occasion of the Queen's Silver Jubilee visit to Australia. In 1984, all existing Members (Fourth Class) were upgraded to the rank of Lieutenant, and could therefore use the suffix 'LVO'.

== Death ==
Wood died in Sydney on 19 August 2006 at age 89. He had been suffering from cancer.

== Rowing record ==
=== Olympics ===
- 1936, eight (8+), did not qualify for finals
- 1948, single (1x), gold
- 1952, single (1x), silver
- 1956, double (2x), bronze

=== Empire/Commonwealth Games ===
- 1950, Single (1x), gold
- 1950, Double (2x), gold
- 1954, Four w/out (4-), gold
- 1954, Double (2x), gold
- 1958, Double (2x), silver

=== Henley Royal Regatta ===
- 1948, Diamond Challenge Sculls, first place
- 1952, Diamond Challenge Sculls, first place

Police appointments
Preceded by Frederick Hanson	Commissioner of the New South Wales Police; 1977–1979	Succeeded by Jim Lees
