= Edmund Fosbery =

Australian politician

Edmund Walcott Fosbery CMG (6 February 1834 – 1 July 1919) was an English-born Australian politician.

He was born at Wotton in Gloucester to navy captain Godfrey Fosbery and Catherine Lyons Walcott. He attended the Royal Navy School at New Cross in Surrey, but in lieu of entering the navy became a legal secretary to Benjamin Disraeli's solicitors. In 1852 he migrated to Victoria, going to the goldfields at Mount Alexander before becoming a police cadet in 1853. In 1854 he married Harriette Lightfoot, with whom he had eight children. In 1861 he was an advisor to the New South Wales government on its police restructuring. In 1874 he was appointed Inspector-General of Police, a position he held until his retirement in 1903. In 1902 he was appointed a Companion of the Order of St Michael and St George. In 1904 he was appointed by the Liberal to the New South Wales Legislative Council, where he served until his death at Darlinghurst in 1919.
