= Mick Fuller =

Australian police chief

Mick Fuller AO APM

Commissioner of the New South Wales Police Force
- In office 31 March 2017 – 31 January 2022
- Preceded by: Andrew Scipione
- Succeeded by: Karen Webb

Personal details
- Born: 1967 or 1968 (age 57–58)
- Children: 4
- Education: Charles Sturt University

Michael John Fuller AO APM (born 1967/1968) is a retired police officer who served as the 22nd Commissioner of the New South Wales Police Force. He replaced Andrew Scipione on 31 March 2017, when Scipione retired. In July 2021, Fuller announced that he would be leaving the New South Wales Police Force in April 2022 to work in the private sector. Deputy commissioner Karen Webb was his replacement, effective 1 February 2022.

== Background and education ==
Michael John Fuller completed a Diploma of Applied Policing at Charles Sturt University and a Diploma in Business Management from TAFE NSW. He obtained a Graduate Certificate in Change Management from South Western Sydney Institute of TAFE. He received a Graduate Diploma in Executive Leadership from the Australian Institute of Police Management. He attended the NSW Police Detective Designated Course and Emergency Management Arrangements. He has taken up management responsibilities as the State Emergency Operation Controller.

== Career in NSW Police Force ==
At the age of 19 years old, Mick Fuller began his career at Kogarah Police Station in 1987 as a junior officer, where he performed general and investigative duties. He joined the City of Sydney Investigations in 1992, where he later became a designated detective in 1993. He later joined the Crime Task Force in 1994 where he took up criminal investigative roles. Fuller became a Detective Sergeant in 2000 and led the drug squad at Kings Cross Police Station. In 2002, he became the Inspector Duty officer for the Eastern Beaches and later joined the Ashfield Target Action Group in 2003. Fuller was promoted to Superintendent Operations Manager for the Greater Metropolitan Region in 2004. In 2007, he became the staff officer to the Deputy Commissioner in charge of field operations. Fuller was promoted as a Local Area Commander for the Eastern Suburbs in 2008 and for the City Central area in 2009. In 2010, he became the Assistant Commissioner and Commander of the Southern Region. Then, he was appointed Commander in charge of Professional Standards in 2013. While being the Assistant Commissioner in 2014, Fuller was also the Commander of the Central Metropolitan Region where he was part of the response team at the Lindt Cafe siege. He was selected as the New South Wales Police Commissioner in 2017.

Fuller is known for his extensive operational background and experience in supervisory positions over 16,000 officers in the NSW Police Force. Fuller has been a spokesman for alcohol-related crime and domestic violence. He has also served as the brand ambassador of the Police Force at several events, including the Bushfire Crisis, the Asia-Pacific Economic Cooperation (APEC) summit, World Youth Day, the Sydney Gay and Lesbian Mardi Gras, the annual New Year's Eve celebration, and Operation Hammerhead.

== Role as NSW Police Commissioner ==
After 29 years of service and at the age of 49, despite being youngest amongst the candidates nominated, the NSW Government appointed Fuller as the new NSW Police Commissioner on 30 March 2017, succeeding Andrew Scipione who served nearly 10 years in the position. The top candidates that were considered for Commissioner included NSW Deputy Commissioner (at the time) Catherine Burn, former NSW Deputy Commissioner Nick Kaldas, Assistant Commissioner Jeff Loy and Australian Border Force Chief Roman Quaedvlieg.

The NSW State Government considered this shift in leadership a good opportunity to introduce generational change to the NSW Police Force. Fuller's appointment to his new role was supported by NSW Premier Gladys Berejiklian and Police Minister Troy Grant. Fuller addressed some significant changes he planned to implement in the Police Force. The reformation would include the remodelling and restructuring of the police workforce throughout the entire state and shifting their focus to the community. Despite his lack of time in counter-terrorism, he placed emphasis on disruption and the prevention of organised crime and terrorism, including the establishment of what the Sydney Morning Herald described as "a special force to tackle and prevent lone-wolf terrorism".

His appointment made Fuller one of New South Wales' highest-paid public servants, peaking at $649,500 in 2020. Greens MLC David Shoebridge described the remuneration as "offensive", in response to an $87,000 salary increase that occurred during his employment.

By 2018, his approach had been labelled as "too aggressive" but Fuller claimed to be "pushing crime down in this state because we're on the front foot and I'll continue to do that."

In July 2021 he announced that he would be retiring from the New South Wales Police Force in April 2022 to work in the private sector.

=== Alleged breaches of anti-corruption rules ===
On 17 February 2022, the Australian Broadcasting Corporation (ABC) revealed that Fuller did not declare his co-ownership of two racehorses to the state government while serving as a police officer. Beginning from 2015, Fuller and at least five other officers in leadership roles within NSW Police owned shares across at least four racehorses from trainer David Vandyke. Vandyke was banned from three years from 1989 after two of his horses tested positive to the analgesic opioid etorphine, and has been fined three times since 2015 after his horses tested positive to banned substances.

Fuller told the ABC he owned 2.5 per cent shares in one horse, Once Epona Time, in 2019 and 2020 while he was commissioner, and in another horse, Mad Magic, from 2015 to 2017 before he was promoted to commissioner. One of Mad Magic's 14 co-owners, businessman David Levy, owned a catering company which won a $3 million contract in 2017, after Fuller became commissioner, to supply NSW Police with meals at major events, police functions and training. In 2017, Levy was the target of an investigation into an illegal asbestos dump on a property he owned. The ABC also revealed that Levy employs a former police officer and husband to an assistant commissioner as a manager at one of his food businesses.

Fuller said to the ABC he was not required to declare his shares and that he had not breached any policies. He also denied having "personally benefited" from Levy's business dealings. Fuller was previously investigated in 2016 over a separate complaint over his involvement with horseracing, but no evidence of wrongdoing was found.

Following the ABC investigation, NSW Racing Minister Kevin Anderson announced that Fuller will not be considered for the board of Racing NSW. On 18 February, NSW Police launched an internal investigation into the co-ownership of racehorses by Fuller and other senior police officers, and if they breached anti-corruption rules. On 20 February, it was revealed that the Law Enforcement Conduct Commission (LECC), the NSW police watchdog, was aware of Fuller's shares in racehorses for several years, having received written complaints from former and serving police officers when Fuller was commissioner.

On 15 March, the LECC published its report, stating there is "clearly no substance in any of the allegations that have been made against Mr Fuller", and that the evidence does not show serious misconduct "or any misconduct at all". The report also said the allegations, first made anonymously to the LECC in 2019 and repeated at the time of Fuller's retirement, "would appear to be a malevolent attempt to cause him harm when he is seeking to establish a new life".

The LECC's explanation was rejected by the ABC, saying in a statement that the LECC did not approach the ABC before making its claims, and called for the LECC to detail the steps it took which led to the findings. The ABC said its reporters have spent months gathering information from reluctant sources, that the LECC report came less than one month after the ABC's publishing, and that the LECC did not contradict the ABC's reporting that Fuller had not declared his racehorse shares.

On 2 November, it was reported that the LECC reopened the investigation after concerns were raised by the new inspector of the commission. On 13 December, the LECC released a report where it reversed its previous decision to clear Fuller of wrongdoing, as well as urged NSW police commissioner Karen Webb to ban officers from owning racehorses or introduce more thorough controls on police involvement in the racing industry.

== Role as State Emergency Operation Controller ==
=== COVID-19 pandemic ===
As of April 2020, when NSW entered a state of emergency lockdown due to the world-wide COVID-19 pandemic, Commissioner Fuller was appointed the State Emergency Operations Controller and was put in charge of enforcing COVID-19 restriction in NSW. These restrictions include the number of people allowed to gather in the same space (indoors and outdoors) applied to homes, offices, public transport, weddings, funerals, restaurants, cinemas and other venues. NSW Police was authorised by the state government to implement bans on anyone breaching COVID-19 restriction rules. The team at the Emergency Operation Controller (located at the NSW Rural Fire Service headquarters) consisted of experts from various fields including police, border force, defence force, education, transport and health personnel, who collaborated to provide NSW residents with the most up-to-date information and develop strategies to deal with the challenges that came with the COVID-19 pandemic.

Fuller's responsibility was to keep NSW residents and communities safe during the COVID-19 pandemic. There was an increase in the number of Police officers despatched across the state to ensure residents comply with the new rules and regulations. Fuller highlighted the importance of effective emergency management strategies and support from the police and military force in guiding NSW residents through this unpredictable time. Fuller was also in charge of overseeing the compulsory Hotel Quarantine Operations for all returning Australian citizens and permanent residents into NSW. He was subsequently responsible for managing and coordinating with the cruise ship Ruby Princess and he oversaw an investigation into the docking and disembarking of that cruise ship which may have led to the spread of the COVID-19 cases in NSW.

In May 2020, the Remuneration Tribunal made the decision to approve a pay rise of close to $87,000 for Fuller to reflect his added roles and responsibilities, which was supported by NSW Premier Berejiklian. Although this took Fuller's annual package to an estimated $649,500, the Premier defended the decision as other senior officers including the Australian Police Force Commissioner, Australian Border Force Commissioner and the Queensland Police Commissioner earned more than Fuller.

=== Black Lives Matter protest ===
In July 2020, Fuller was involved in the plan to stop a Black Lives Matter protest from taking place in the Sydney CBD with concerns for another potential outbreak of COVID-19 in NSW. Stacey Maloney, who was the Acting Assistant Commissioner in charge in the city, was responsible for obtaining the relevant documents required to apply to the Supreme Court of New South Wales regarding this matter. Although the court order did not ban the rally that was supposed to take place on 28 July 2020, charges could be made against protesters who chose to attend for disruption of traffic and any violation of a public health order, which were NSW authorities' main concerns. Fuller expressed concern that protest attendees would not be able to keep a safe distance and there was a high risk of COVID-19 transmission during the protest as crowds gathered. Fuller insisted that the event be postponed or rescheduled due to the continuous community transmission of COVID-19 in NSW. Event organisers disagreed and claimed that they had the right to protest. The Supreme Court Justice Mark Ierace later granted NSW Police approval to ban the protest due to increasing concerns over potential escalation of COVID-19 transmission that could reflect the outbreak situation in the neighbouring state of Victoria. In a media statement, NSW Police informed the public that the protest was officially unauthorised and recommended that people should reconsider their decision to participate.

== Work after retirement from NSW Police ==
In March 2022, Fuller and Professor Mary O'Kane, chair of the Independent Planning Commission and former NSW Chief Scientist and Engineer, were appointed to lead an inquiry into the causes of and response to the 2022 eastern Australia floods. In August 2022, the inquiry's findings were made public, making 28 recommendations, all of which were supported by the NSW government.

== Personal life ==
Fuller is married with four children. Fuller was neighbour to Scott Morrison while he was Treasurer.

Fuller is a supporter of National Rugby League club the St. George Illawarra Dragons.

== Honours and achievements ==
In 2004, Fuller received a National Medal and the 1st clasp to the NSW Police Medal. In January 2009, he was awarded the 2nd clasp to the NSW Police Medal and received the Australian Police Medal. After another five years in the service, Fuller was awarded the 1st clasp to the National Medal as well as a National Police Service Medal in 2014. He was appointed an Officer of the Order of Australia.

Police appointments
Preceded by Andrew Scipione	Commissioner of the New South Wales Police Force; 2017–2022	Succeeded by Karen Webb
