= Norman Allan =

Australian police officer (1909-1977)

Norman Allan CMG, MVO, QPM

Commissioner of the New South Wales Police
- In office 28 February 1962 – 14 November 1972
- Preceded by: Colin Delaney
- Succeeded by: Frederick Hanson

Personal details
- Born: 3 June 1909 Lithgow, New South Wales
- Died: 28 January 1977 (aged 67) Manly, New South Wales

Norman Thomas William Allan, CMG, MVO, QPM (3 June 1909 – 28 January 1977) was the Commissioner of the New South Wales Police Force, from 1962 to 1972.

== Biography ==
A Protestant and Freemason, Allan joined the NSW Police Force in 1929, posted at Redfern. From 1932, he prosecuted at the Central Criminal Court, until transferred to headquarters in 1938. Allan attained the rank of inspector in 1948, then superintendent in 1956, and was assistant to three consecutive police commissioners: William John MacKay, James Frederick Scott, and Colin John Delaney.

In 1953, Allan was awarded the Coronation Medal, and in 1957 he earned the Queen's Police Medal for Distinguished Service and the Police Long Service and Good Conduct Medal. He was also specially commended by the State Premier Robert Heffron for devotion to duty and exceptional skill and ability in connection with the conviction of Stephen Leslie Bradley for the murder of Graeme Thorne. Allan was acting deputy-commissioner in 1959 and became Chief Commissioner of Police on 28 February 1962. In July 1968, while negotiating with armed hostage-taker Wally Mellish at Glenfield, west of Sydney, he achieved national fame by arranging the forced marriage of the criminal to his female hostage, then supplying Mellish with an Armalite rifle and 200 bullets.

Known unofficially as "Norman the Foreman," Allan finished his tenure during the years when Sir Robert Askin was Premier of New South Wales. While Allan was Police Commissioner, illegal casinos flourished in Sydney, in full view of both police and the public. Yet very few police raids ever took place. The collective annual turnover of illegal casinos in Sydney in 1974 was estimated to be $600 million (or $3.8 billion in 2008 terms). This netted the operators an untaxed profit of $16 million ($95 million in 2008) after all costs and alleged bribes had been paid off. A close associate of prominent Sydney racing identity Perc Galea claimed that Police Commissioner Allan and his successor Frederick Hanson were paid $100,000 a year each in bribes.

One of the greatest challenges of Allan's tenure as commissioner was the Arantz scandal. Detective Sergeant Philip Arantz developed a computer program that gave accurate crime data. The new data showed that information previously published by the commissioner was misleading or incorrect. NSW Police refused to acknowledge the new data, which led Arantz to leak it to the press in November 1971. Following this, Arantz was forcibly admitted into hospital having been declared mentally ill by a police doctor. The police doctor later claimed that he had been coerced into doing so by senior police. In 1972 Arantz was sacked from the force. Allan at first denied that the new information was accurate, but he later conceded its validity in a report tabled to parliament in September 1972. Arantz was finally reinstated into the police force in 1989, after the NSW parliament brought in new reinstatement legislation.

In July 2008 Penguin published the book Gentle Satan: Abe Saffron, My Father by Alan Saffron, the only son of reputed Sydney crime czar Abe Saffron. The book contains allegations about Allan's supposed corrupt relationship with Saffron, claiming that Saffron regularly paid both Allan and Askin bribes of between A$5,000 and $10,000 per week each, that Allan was a frequent visitor to Saffron's office and home. Also included in the book is the allegation that Saffron paid for an overseas trip for Allan and an unnamed female companion.

== Notes ==
Police appointments
Preceded by Colin Delaney	Commissioner of the New South Wales Police; 1962–1972	Succeeded by Frederick Hanson
