= Les Abbott (rugby league) =

Australian rugby league footballer and administrator

- Les Abbott. St.George,1936

Personal information
- Full name: Leslie Frederick Abbott
- Born: 12 November 1915 Newtown, New South Wales
- Died: June 12, 2011 (aged 95) Lithgow, New South Wales

Playing information
- Position: Wing
Club
| Years | Team | Pld | T | G | FG | P |
|---|---|---|---|---|---|---|
| 1936–37 | St. George | 16 | 2 | 0 | 0 | 6 |
- Relatives: Cecil Abbott (brother)

Leslie Frederick 'Bunny' Abbott OAM (1915–2011) was an Australian rugby league footballer who played in the 1930s.

== Career ==
Les "Bunny' Abbott was graded in 1935 in Third Grade. The following season he played every First Grade season game and looked to have a long future with St. George, unfortunately in the 1937 season, he was dogged with injury and he retired. He was later to help organise and establish rugby league in Lithgow, New South Wales at the St. Pat's Club.

== Honours ==
Abbott was awarded the Medal of the Order of Australia (OAM) in 2008 for his service to the community of Lithgow, New South Wales, particularly in Rugby League Football as a player, coach, referee, official and timekeeper.

Abbott was the elder brother of the ex-NSW Police Commissioner Cec Abbott.

== Death ==
'Bunny' Abbott died on 12 June 2011 at Lithgow District Hospital. Age 95.
