= Abe Saffron =

Australian businessman (1919–2006)

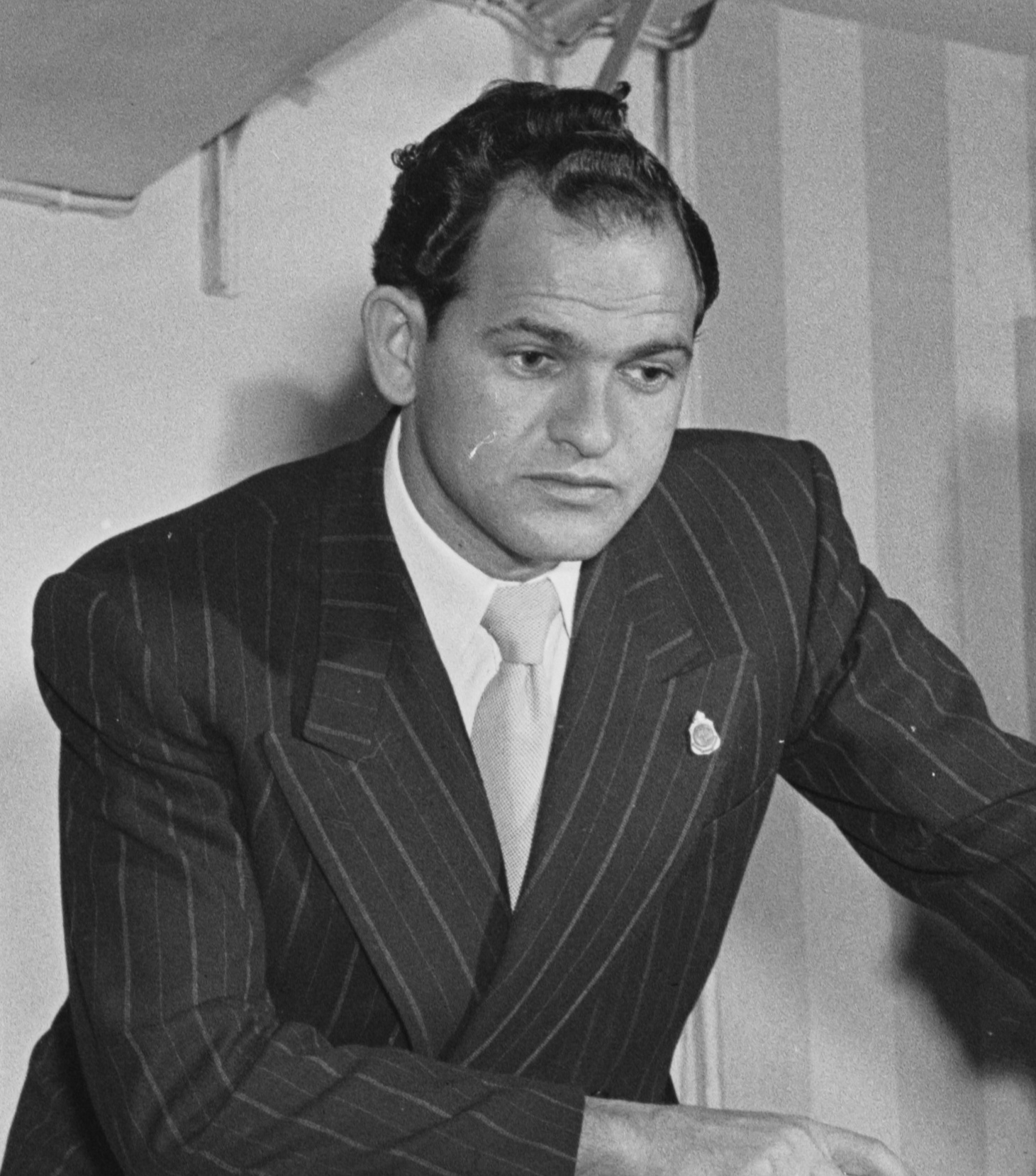
- Saffron at the Roosevelt Club in Kings Cross, Sydney in 1950.
- Born: 6 October 1919; Annandale, New South Wales, Australia
- Died: 15 September 2006 (aged 86); Sydney, Australia
- Other names: Mr. Sin; King of King's Cross; Mr. Big of Australian crime
- Occupations: Property developer, hotelier, night club owner
- Spouse: Doreen Krantz (m. 1947; died 1999)
- Children: 2
- Conviction: Tax evasion

Abraham Gilbert Saffron (6 October 1919 – 15 September 2006) was an Australian hotelier, nightclub owner, and property developer who was one of the major figures in organised crime in Australia in the latter half of the 20th century.

For several decades, members of government, the judiciary and the media made repeated allegations that Saffron was involved in a wide range of criminal activities, including alcohol sales, dealing in stolen goods, illegal gambling, prostitution, drug dealing, bribery and extortion. He was charged with a range of offences including "scandalous conduct", possession of an unlicensed firearm and possession of stolen goods, but his only major conviction was for federal tax evasion.

He gained nationwide notoriety in the media, earning various nicknames including "Mr Sin", the "Mr Big of Australian crime", and "the boss of the Cross" / "King of King's Cross" (a reference to the Kings Cross red-light district, where he owned numerous businesses).

In March 2021 ABC Television aired an investigative documentary series, The Ghost Train Fire, which directly implicated Saffron in an arson plot at Luna Park Sydney in 1979 that resulted in the deaths of seven people, including six children. Former senior police officers testified on camera that Saffron ordered the crime, which was swiftly and systematically covered up by corrupt police and government figures. Saffron always vigorously denied such accusations, and was renowned for the extent to which he was willing to sue for libel against his accusers.

== Early life ==
Saffron was born in Annandale, New South Wales in 1919, of Russian Jewish descent. He was educated at Annandale and Leichhardt primary schools and at the selective Fort Street High School. Although his mother hoped he would become a doctor, Saffron left school at 15 and began his business career in the family's drapery firm in the late 1930s.

On 5 August 1940, Saffron enlisted in the Australian Army and was promoted to the rank of corporal before his discharge in January 1944. Saffron is reputed to have served in the merchant navy. However, Saffron's name does not appear in the Merchant Navy category of the Department of Veterans' Affairs as having served in the Merchant Navy from January to June 1944.

== Career ==
Upon leaving the Merchant Navy, he became involved with a notorious Sydney nightclub called The Roosevelt Club, co-owned by "prominent Sydney businessman" Sammy Lee. It is claimed that Saffron began his rise to power in the Sydney underworld through his involvement in the lucrative sale of black-market alcohol at the Roosevelt.

At the time NSW clubs and pubs were subject to strict licensing laws which limited trading hours and regulated alcohol prices and sale conditions. When Saffron began working at the Roosevelt, alcohol sales were also subject to wartime rationing regulations. A subsequent Royal Commission into the NSW liquor trade heard evidence that in the early 1950s The Roosevelt Club was clearing over £1000 per week in alcohol sales, of which only £100 was being banked as liquor takings.

In 1947 Saffron, in partnership with Hilton Granville Kincaid and Mendel Brunen, took over the ownership of the Roosevelt. In January 1953, the club was closed after being declared a "disorderly house" by the NSW Police Commissioner. After Saffron sold the Roosevelt, it was able to be re-opened. Saffron then relocated to Newcastle; he worked there for a time as a bookmaker, but it has been reported that he was not successful.

When questioned by a Royal Commission about how he had obtained the substantial sum (£3000) with which he bought his first pub licence in Newcastle, he claimed that the money had come from savings he had accumulated from his bookmaking activity, although he was notably vague when pressed about the exact sources of this income.

In 1948 Saffron returned to Sydney and began purchasing licences for a string of Sydney pubs. It was later alleged that he also established covert controlling interests in numerous other pubs through a series of "dummy" owners. The 1954 Maxwell Royal Commission heard evidence that Saffron used these pubs to obtain legitimately purchased alcohol, diverting it to the various nightclubs and other businesses that he operated and selling at black market prices, realising vast profits.

By the 1960s Saffron owned or controlled a string of nightclubs, strip joints and sex shops in Kings Cross, including the Sydney club Les Girls, home of the famous transvestite revue. During this period he began to expand his business operations into "legitimate" enterprises and to establish holdings in other states, such as the Raffles Hotel, Perth, leading several state governments to launch inquiries into his activities.

=== International connections ===
The Australian Commonwealth Police alleged that Mr Saffron met with Chicago mobster, Joseph Dan Testa, in 1969, while Testa was in Australia.

== Juanita Nielsen disappearance ==
One of the most contentious incidents in Saffron's career was his rumoured involvement in the disappearance and presumed murder of newspaper publisher and anti-development campaigner Juanita Nielsen in July 1975. Although no direct connection to the crime was ever established, Saffron was shown to have had proven connections with several people suspected of being involved in Nielsen's disappearance. Saffron owned the Carousel nightclub in Kings Cross, where Nielsen was last seen on the day of her disappearance; his long-serving deputy James McCartney Anderson managed the club; one of the men later convicted of conspiring to kidnap Nielsen was Eddie Trigg, the night manager of the club; it was also reported that Saffron had financial links with developer Frank Theeman, against whose development Nielsen was campaigning.

== Exposé ==
In the 1980s investigative journalist David Hickie published his landmark book The Prince and The Premier, which included a substantial section detailing Saffron's alleged involvement in many aspects of organised crime in Sydney. The book's central thesis was that former NSW Premier Robert Askin was corrupt, that Askin and Police Commissioners Norman Allan and Fred Hanson received huge bribes from the illegal gaming industry over many years, and that Askin and other senior public officials had overseen and approved of a major expansion of organised crime in New South Wales.

Using only material that was already in the public domain, obtained from evidence tendered to royal commissions and allegations made by politicians under parliamentary privilege, Hickie devoted an entire section of his book to Saffron's business activities. Among the most damning material was the detailed evidence tendered to the 1954 Maxwell Royal Commission into the NSW liquor trade, which concluded that Saffron had established covert controlling interests in numerous NSW pubs to supply his "sly grog" outlets, and that he had systematically made false statements to the commission and sworn false oaths before the NSW Licensing Court.

In the second edition of The Politics of Heroin by Alfred W. McCoy, in a chapter summarising the Nugan Hand Bank it is mentioned that Askin and Saffron regularly had dinner together at the Bourbon & Beefsteak, owned by American expatriate Bernie Houghton.

The NSW Police were unable to effect any substantial convictions against Saffron over a period of almost 40 years, which only served to reinforce the public concerns about his alleged influence over state police and government officials, but after the establishment of the National Crime Authority in the 1980s, he became a major target for the new federal investigative body.

== Luna Park ghost train fire ==
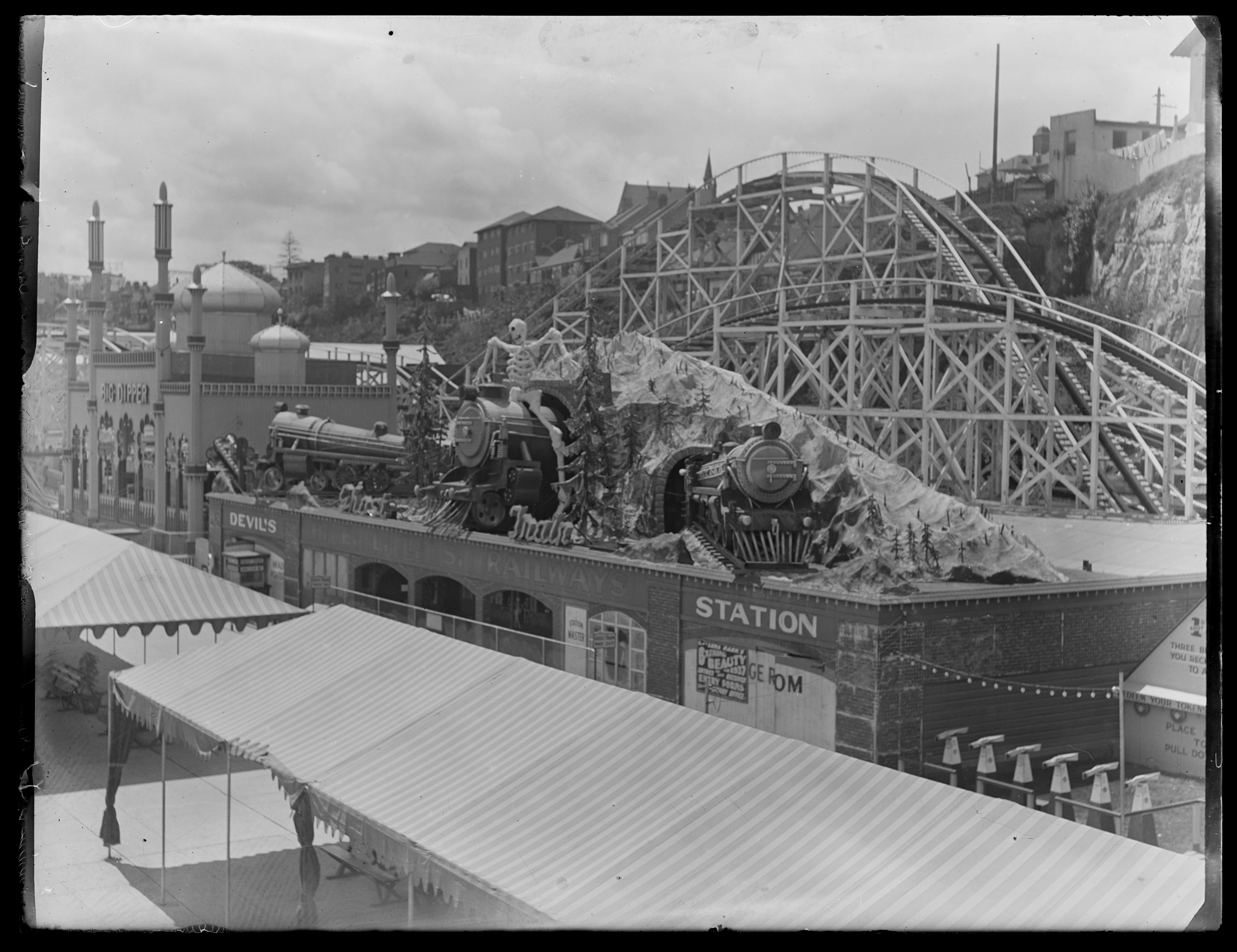
The Ghost Train, Luna Park, Sydney, c. 1955

In May 2007, The Sydney Morning Herald published an article on Saffron's reputed involvement in the infamous Ghost Train fire at Luna Park Sydney in 1979, when a suspected arson attack destroyed the popular ride, killing seven people. In an interview with Herald journalist Kate McClymont, Saffron's niece Anne Buckingham linked Saffron to the fire, stating that her uncle "liked to collect things" and that he intended to purchase Luna Park.

At the time of the fire, the park was being leased to property developer Leon Fink and his partner, who told the Herald that he had been stopped from purchasing the park by the then state ALP government of Neville Wran—reputedly because Fink's business partner Nathan Spatt had made derogatory comments about Wran's use of a private aircraft belonging to Sir Peter Abeles—and Fink said that Wran once said to him at a function: "While my bum points to the ground, your partner will not get that lease." The Herald story also stated that a parliamentary report revealed that then Deputy Premier Jack Ferguson had told John Ducker (head of the Labor Council of New South Wales) that Wran had decided that Fink would not get Wran's support because he did not donate enough money to the ALP.

In March 2021 ABC Television broadcast a three-part investigative documentary series, Exposed: The Ghost Train Fire, which directly implicated Saffron in an arson plot at Luna Park Sydney in 1979, resulting in the deaths of seven people, six of them children. Former senior police officers Steve Bullock and Paul Egge, supported by the testimony of other involved officers and former licensing magistrate James Swanson, stated on camera their belief that Saffron ordered the crime, which they claim was swiftly and systematically covered up by corrupt police and government figures.

It was alleged by the program that the motive was control of the valuable harbourside land next to the Sydney Harbour Bridge and its unobstructed views of the Sydney Opera House. The allegations state that Saffron and associate Jack Rooklyn, a poker-machine promoter, wanted to gain control of and redevelop the Luna Park site. The docuseries' investigative journalists named NSW premiers Robert Askin and Neville Wran as corrupt close associates of Saffron, along with the police commissioner Norman "Bill" Allan, the High Court justice Lionel Murphy and lawyer Morgan Ryan, among others.

Saffron's cousins Hal and Col Goldstein and his nephew Sam Cowper ran the company that won control of Luna Park after the fire. Saffron also had 100 game machines installed at Luna Park.

== Tax evasion ==
In November 1987, following an extensive investigation by the NCA and the Australian Taxation Office, Saffron was found guilty of tax evasion. His conviction was largely made possible by evidence provided by his former associate Jim Anderson, who testified that Saffron's clubs routinely kept two sets of accounts—one set of so-called "black" books, which recorded actual turnover, and another set ("white" books) which were purposely fabricated with the intent of evading tax by falsifying income.

Despite several legal appeals, Saffron served 27 months in jail. Judge Loveday said on sentencing "In my view the maximum penalty of three years is inadequate."

Saffron prosecuted defamation cases against a number of publications. He unsuccessfully sued The Sydney Morning Herald but was successful in later suits against the authors, publishers and distributors of Tough: 101 Australian Gangsters and the publishers of The Gold Coast Bulletin, which contained a defamatory crossword clue, viz. "Sydney underworld figure, nicknamed Mr Sin (3,7)."

== Death ==
Before his death he lived in retirement in Potts Point, Sydney. Abe Saffron died at St. Vincent's Hospital, Sydney in 2006, aged 86. He was interred next to his wife, Doreen, at Rookwood Cemetery, Sydney.

In November 2006, The Daily Telegraph newspaper of Sydney reported that Saffron's son Alan would receive only $500,000 from his father's multimillion-dollar estate; the article quoted various estimates of the value of the estate that ranged from A$30 million to as much as $140 million. The article reported that Saffron's eight grandchildren (including Alan Saffron's five children) would receive $1 million each, Saffron's mistress Teresa Tkaczyk would receive a lifetime annuity of $1000 a week and the couple's apartments in Surry Hills, Elizabeth Bay and the Gold Coast and that Melissa Hagenfelds (Saffron's daughter by his former mistress Rita Hagenfelds) would also receive a $1,000 a week annuity and apartments at Centennial Park and Elizabeth Bay. Other reported provisions of the will included bequests of up to $10 million to various charities. Previously, a month prior, Alan accused his late father of staging a break-in attempt to steal his late mother's will. According to Alan, his home in Los Angeles was broken into between May 2000 and August 2002, though nothing was stolen.

== Legacy ==
In August 2007, Allen & Unwin published the first major biography of Saffron, written by investigative journalist Tony Reeves.

In November 2011, it was revealed that Saffron's son Alan had stolen $250,000 from the inheritance intended for his grandson Daniel Saffron and invested it in his Los Angeles restaurant. The restaurant, Burger Kitchen, was featured on the reality TV show Kitchen Nightmares.

The Sydney Morning Herald reported in October 2011 that Saffron had also fathered another son, Adam Brand.

In December 2023, Saffron's grandson David was indicted by US Department of Justice for a number of crimes including money laundering and wire fraud.

=== Gentle Satan: Abe Saffron, My Father ===
In July 2008, Saffron's son Alan returned to Australia from his home in the US to promote his memoir Gentle Satan: Abe Saffron, My Father; the publication of the book was widely covered in the Australian media. Saffron's book names former Saffron associate James McCartney Anderson as the chief agent of the conspiracy to silence Juanita Nielsen. Anderson (who died in 2003) consistently denied any involvement while he was alive, but police reportedly failed to check Anderson's alibi that he was interstate when Nielsen disappeared.

According to Alan Saffron, his father controlled the vice trade- including illegal gambling and prostitution- in every state except Tasmania and the Northern Territory, and that he bribed "a host of politicians and policemen" to ensure he was protected from prosecution. The book claims that Abe Saffron made payments of between A$5000 and $10,000 per week to former NSW premier Robert Askin and former police commissioner Norman Allan over many years, that Askin and Allan both visited Saffron's office on several occasions, that Allan also visited the Saffron family home, and that Abe Saffron paid for an all-expenses overseas trip for Allan and a young female 'friend'. According to Alan Saffron, his father became the "bagman" for Sydney's illegal liquor and prostitution rackets and most illegal gambling activities, collecting payoffs that were then passed to Askin, Allan and others; in return his father was completely protected.

Saffron claimed he could name people "much bigger" than Askin and Norman Allan, specifically referring to:

... one particular businessman I was desperate to name, and there's one particular police officer who is extremely high ranking. They're the biggest names you can imagine in Australia.

In an interview with Herald reporter Lisa Carty, Alan Saffron said all the conspirators are named in the original manuscript of the book, which is now in the possession of the publishers, Penguin, and that the book would be re-published with additional names after people not originally named had died.

== See also ==
- Dawn O'Donnell
