= Gary O'Callaghan =

Australian radio personality

Gary O'Callaghan MBE
- Born: 11 October 1933; Melbourne, Victoria, Australia
- Died: 19 August 2017 (aged 83)
- Occupation: Radio personality
- Years active: 1951–2007

Gary Bernard O'Callaghan MBE (11 October 1933 − 18 August 2017) was an Australian radio announcer based in Sydney, known for his on-air character, "Sammy Sparrow". He was an Australian Commercial Radio Hall of Fame recipient. He dominated Sydney radio from the 1960s to the 1980s.

== Early life ==
O'Callaghan was born in Melbourne in 1933.

== Career ==
O'Callaghan's career in radio started in 1951 when he joined 2SM as an office boy, aged 17. He did his first on-air work within a few weeks. This began what the Daily Telegraph newspaper called "one of the most distinguished careers in the history of Australian broadcasting". Early in his career, in the 1950s, he was notable for his exclusive coverage of the Cold War defection that became known as the Petrov Affair. He joined 2UE in 1956, where he was known for his long running, and ratings winning, breakfast show. He stayed with 2UE until retirement in 2003, then had a short time at 2KY during Kerry Packer's ownership of 2UE. He moved back to the mid north coast of NSW where he continued to work at 2MC.

== Awards ==
O'Callaghan became a Member of the Order of the British Empire (MBE), was named Father of the Year, and won the Queen's Jubilee Medal. He was an Australian Commercial Radio Awards Hall of Fame inductee in 2004.

== Later life ==
O'Callaghan and his wife Dorothy lived at Wauchope, New South Wales, on the NSW Mid North Coast, near Port Macquarie.
