= Guy Cooper (disambiguation) =

Guy Cooper is a baseball player.

Guy Cooper may also refer to:

- Guy Cooper (motorcyclist), former American national champion motocross racer in AMA Motocross Championship
- Guy Cooper (tennis), tennis player in 1931 Wimbledon Championships – Men's Singles
- Guy Cooper Sr. and Jr. of Cooper Nuclear Station, involved in the development of publicly owned power in Nebraska, US
