= Shane Fitzsimmons =

Australian public servant (born 1969)

Shane Fitzsimmons AO AFSM

Commissioner of Resilience NSW
- In office 1 May 2020 – 16 December 2022

New South Wales Rural Fire Service Commissioner
- In office 18 September 2007 – 30 April 2020
- Preceded by: Phil Koperberg AO, AFSM
- Succeeded by: Rob Rogers AFSM

Personal details
- Born: Shane Alan Fitzimmons; 22 February 1969 (age 57) Sydney, New South Wales
- Parent: George Fitzsimmons
- Profession: Emergency services management

Shane Alan Fitzsimmons AO AFSM (born 22 February 1969) is an Australian public servant who was formerly the head of Resilience NSW and was previously the Commissioner of the New South Wales Rural Fire Service between September 2007 and April 2020.

== Career ==
Fitzsimmons joined the NSW Rural Fire Service (NSW RFS) as a volunteer member of Duffys Forest Brigade in 1985. After qualifying as a motor mechanic he became a salaried officer in the NSW RFS in 1994, taking on the role of Regional Planning Officer for the Central East Region. He became State Operations Officer in 1996 and two years later was named Assistant Commissioner, Operations. This role later became expanded and restyled as Assistant Commissioner, Regional Management and Strategic Development.

In 2004, Fitzsimmons became the inaugural visiting fellow of the Australasian Fire Authorities Council to the Australian Institute of Police Management. He held this role for 12 months.

After serving as Executive Director Operations and Regional Management, Fitzsimmons was appointed Acting Commissioner in mid-2007 following previous Commissioner Phil Koperberg's resignation to take up a role in NSW Parliament. Fitzsimmons was officially endorsed as NSW Rural Fire Service Commissioner on 18 September.

Fitzsimmons received widespread and varied comments for his leadership during the 2019–20 Australian bushfire season after he commented that NSW Rural Fire Service volunteers wouldn't want to be paid. He has been praised for his high level of empathy, solemnity and calmness in an extremely difficult time.

In April 2020, Fitzsimmons accepted an appointment to be the head of Resilience NSW, a new government agency focused on disaster preparedness and recovery approach. He started his new position on 1 May 2020.

On the 15 December 2022, Fitzsimmons announced the government orders dissolving the Resilience New South Wales agency and announced that his position had been terminated. The orders took effect the next day.

== Honours ==
Fitzsimons was awarded the Australian Fire Service Medal in 2001.

Fitzsimons was named the NSW Australian of the Year in 2020 and was a contender for the Australian of the Year in 2021.

In 2022 he was appointed as Officer of the Order of Australia (AO) in the 2022 Australia Day Honours for "distinguished service to the community through leadership roles within fire and emergency response organisations".

Fire appointments
| Preceded by Phil Koperberg | Commissioner of the NSW Rural Fire Service; 2007 – 2020 | Succeeded by Rob Rogers |
Civic offices
| New title | Head of Resilience NSW; 2020 – 2022 | Incumbent |
