= Peter Ryan (police officer) =

British and Australian police officer (1944–2025)

Commissioner Peter Ryan OStJ QPM

19th Commissioner of New South Wales Police
- In office 30 August 1996 – 17 April 2002
- Preceded by: Tony Lauer
- Succeeded by: Ken Moroney

Personal details
- Born: 18 May 1944 Lancaster, Lancashire, England
- Died: 15 December 2025 Marlborough, Wiltshire, England
- Spouse(s): Barbara (m. 1965; div. 1974) Adrienne Butterworth (m. 1985; div. 2011) Ruth (m. 2013)
- Education: University of Lancaster; Macquarie University

Peter James Ryan (18 May 1944 – 15 December 2025) was a British police officer. He was appointed by New South Wales premier Bob Carr as the Australian state's police commissioner in 1996 in order to restore public confidence after the Wood Royal Commission into police corruption. Ryan led the force through one of its most turbulent periods, stepping down in 2002.

== Early life and education ==
Ryan was born in Lancaster, Lancashire, on 18 May 1944 to Laurence and Maureen Ryan.

== Police career in England ==
Ryan joined Lancashire Constabulary on 16 January 1961 as a police cadet. He completed the training course at Bruche Police National Training Centre in 1963. On 19 May 1963, he was given his first posting as a probationer in Little Hulton on the outskirts of Greater Manchester. In 1968, he was one of the first intake of police officers into the new University of Lancaster. On graduation with a Bachelor of Arts degree he was promoted to sergeant, and in 1973 was promoted to an inspector stationed at headquarters in Preston.

Ryan joined the Metropolitan Police Service in London and was chief superintendent at Chelsea police station during the Harrods bombing in December 1983. He was chief constable of Norfolk Constabulary from 1990 to 1993 and was then the first National Director of Police Training at the Police Staff College, Bramshill, prior to his appointment in 1996 to New South Wales Police in Australia.

== Commissioner of New South Wales Police ==
Ryan was recruited to the commissioner's position following the controversial Royal Commission into the New South Wales Police Service (Wood Royal Commission) that examined police corruption. The royal commission ran from 1995 to 1997. He was appointed by the Premier of New South Wales, Bob Carr.

In February 1999, Ryan was reappointed for a further five years. Some aspects of the new contract were kept secret but the controversy over it caused it to be released in its entirety and a parliamentary enquiry to investigate the circumstances surrounding its signing. The contract made Ryan the highest-paid public servant in Australia.

Ryan resigned from the New South Wales Police Service in 2002, two years early, and received a payout of $455,000–12 months' salary.

Paul Whelan, the police minister who recommended Ryan as commissioner after approaching him in the United Kingdom, had recently retired from the ministry and it is believed that his successor, Michael Costa, did not want Ryan to remain as commissioner with the Opposition citing that Costa had made contradictory remarks about whether Ryan had resigned or was sacked and questioning whether Ryan was entitled to a payout if he had resigned.

After leaving the service, Ryan became the principal security adviser to the International Olympic Committee (IOC). He additionally provided security expertise to major sporting event organisers and mentored numerous security operations planners.

Ryan was covered widely by Australian and international media and is the subject of the 2003 biography Peter Ryan: The Inside Story by Sydney author Sue Williams.

== Personal life and death ==
Ryan married his second wife, Adrienne Ryan (née Butterworth), who moved to Sydney with him upon his appointment as police commissioner. They divorced in 2011. Ryan married again in 2013.

Ryan died on 15 December 2025 at the age of 81.

== Honours ==

Ryan was appointed an Officer of the Order of St John. He was also awarded the Queen's Police Medal, the NSW Police Minister's Olympic Commendation, the NSW Police Commissioner's Olympic Citation and the Police Long Service and Good Conduct Medal (for service in the UK police forces).

Police appointments
Preceded by Tony Lauer	Commissioner of New South Wales Police; 1996–2002	Succeeded by Ken Moroney
