= Frederick Hanson =

Australian police chief

Frederick Hanson CBE, QPM

Commissioner of the New South Wales Police
- In office 15 November 1972 – 31 December 1976
- Preceded by: Norman Allan
- Succeeded by: Mervyn Wood

Personal details
- Born: 26 May 1914 Orange, New South Wales
- Died: 26 October 1980 (aged 66)

Frederick John Hanson, CBE, QPM (26 May 1914 – 26 October 1980) was the Commissioner of the New South Wales Police Force from 1972 to 1976.

== Early life ==
Hanson was born in Orange, New South Wales, on 26 May 1914 and was educated at Christian Brothers College, Burwood. He worked as a manufacturing jeweller's assistant and a transit porter before joining the police force in 1936. He served in the Second World War with the Royal Australian Air Force from 1942 until 1946. He was rapidly promoted through the police ranks, becoming assistant commissioner in 1968 and deputy commissioner in early 1972. His nickname in the force was "Slippery".

== Career ==
Hanson was promoted to commissioner on 15 November 1972, having been recommended for the role by his predecessor, Norman Allan, whose term had been tarnished by corruption allegations. Upon taking office, Hanson reportedly sacked 28 corrupt officers and announced that he saw drugs as the biggest problem facing police. As commissioner, Hanson reorganised the force structure, changed the police uniform, introduced Australia's first crime intelligence unit, and allowed women police officers to transfer to general duties for the first time. He was appointed a Commander of the Order of the British Empire in January 1974. He was occasionally referred to as a "playboy" for his personal habits while commissioner, and critics derided his term as undistinguished.

As with his predecessor, issues of corruption and poor management continued throughout Hanson's term. The Australian Broadcasting Corporation settled a defamation action in 1976 after alleging the previous year that he held a financial interest in a gambling club; however, after his death in 1980 freed media to report without facing Australia's strict defamation laws, he faced repeated allegations of corruption, including having received money from illegal gambling interests and personal ties to various criminal figures. He retired early in 1976. Hanson sought successfully to have Mervyn Wood appointed as his successor; Wood, like Hanson and Allan, was dogged by corruption allegations and later unsuccessfully prosecuted.

Hanson made an abortive campaign as an independent candidate for the New South Wales Legislative Assembly seat of Gosford at the 1978 election, but withdrew before election day. Bob Bottom would later allege that his campaign had been motivated by anger at the decision of Premier Neville Wran to order the closure of illegal casinos.

Hanson died in his car in his garage in October 1980. The engine was not running when the body was found. It was initially reported as a heart attack, but later understood to be from carbon monoxide poisoning. The coroner decided not to hold an inquest.

Police appointments
Preceded by Norman Allan	Commissioner of the New South Wales Police; 1972–1976	Succeeded by Mervyn Wood
