= John Avery (police officer) =

Australian police officer (1927-2018)

John Avery AO, APM

17th Commissioner of the New South Wales Police
- In office 7 August 1984 – 12 March 1991
- Preceded by: Cecil Abbott
- Succeeded by: Tony Lauer

Personal details
- Born: 7 August 1927
- Died: 19 May 2018 (aged 90)
- Education: Macquarie University

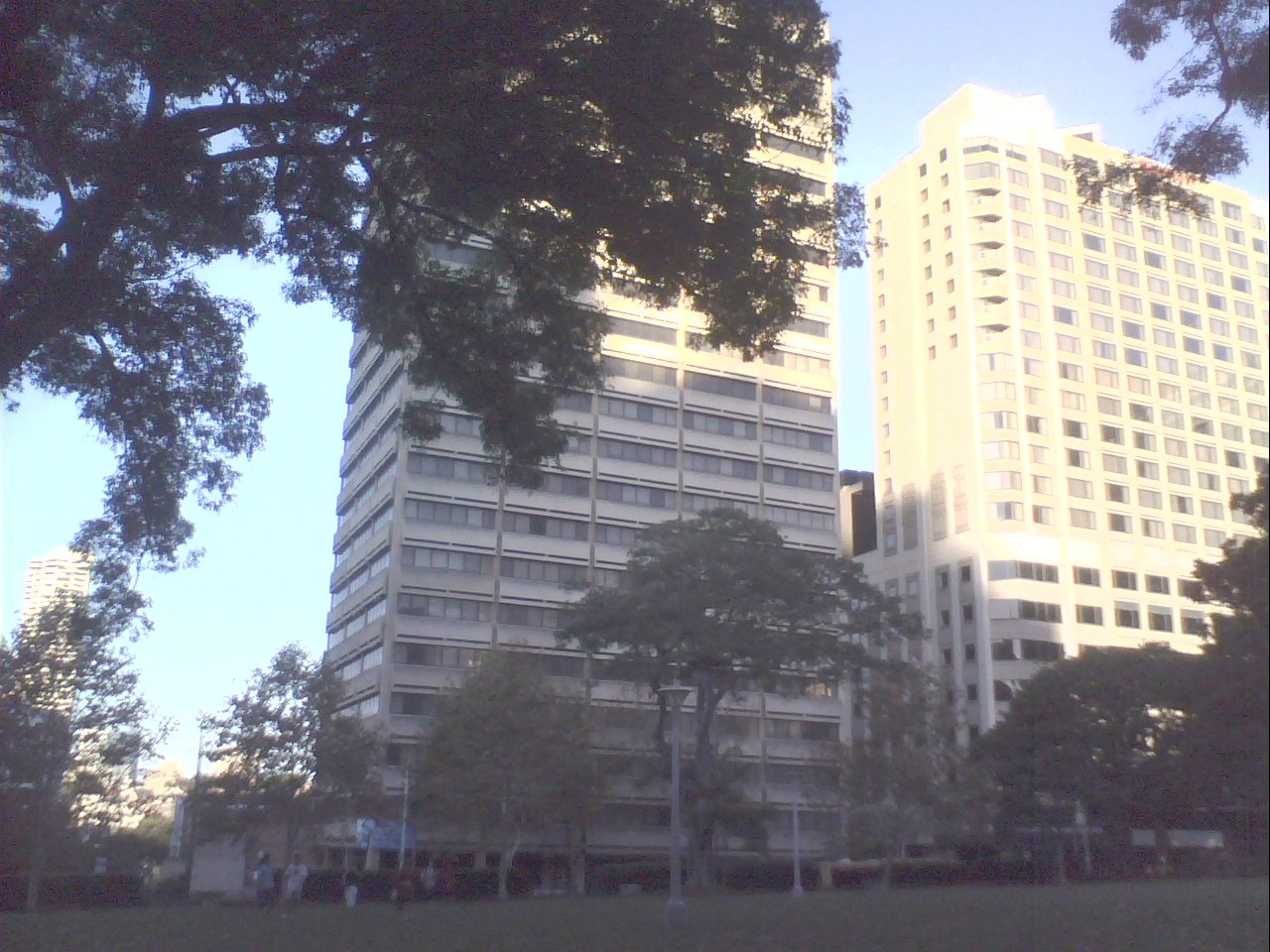
The former headquarters of the New South Wales Police Service on College Street, Sydney was named the Avery Building in honour of Avery.

John Keith Avery, AO, APM (7 August 1927 – 19 May 2018) was the Commissioner of the New South Wales Police from 1984 to 1991.

== Commissioner of New South Wales Police ==
John Keith Avery was the 17th leader of the organisation and the 10th person known under the title of Commissioner of Police. Avery was one of the longest serving and more popular Commissioners of Police to serve the state of New South Wales.

One of the first Police Commissioners to have a tertiary education, Avery held a master's degree from Macquarie University and a Diploma in Criminology. He was awarded the Officer of the Order of Australia, Australian Police Medal, Centenary Medal and National Medal.

== Legacy ==
The library at the New South Wales Police College at Goulburn is named in his honour. The former headquarters of the New South Wales Police in College Street, Sydney was also named in his honour, named the Avery Building until the headquarters moved to a new building in Parramatta in 2003.

== Personal life ==
Avery retired with his wife to Port Macquarie on the mid-north coast of New South Wales. They had three children.

Police appointments
Preceded by Cecil Abbott	Commissioner of the New South Wales Police; 1984–1991	Succeeded by Tony Lauer
