= Tony Lauer =

Australian police officer (1935–2022)

Tony Lauer APM

18th Commissioner of the New South Wales Police
- In office 13 March 1991 – 19 February 1996
- Preceded by: John Avery
- Succeeded by: Peter Ryan

Personal details
- Born: 19 December 1935 Newcastle, New South Wales
- Died: 30 November 2022 (aged 86)
- Spouse: Joy Stock
- Education: University of Sydney

Anthony Raymond Lauer, APM (19 December 1935 – 30 November 2022) was an Australian police officer who served as the Commissioner of the New South Wales Police from 1991 until 1996. In February 1996, Lauer's term ended in controversy with his resignation soon after the start of the Wood Royal Commission into police corruption.

== Education ==
Tony Lauer was born in Newcastle, New South Wales, on 19 December 1935 and educated at Penrith High School, University of Sydney, Australian Police Staff College, and the FBI Academy at Quantico, Virginia. Lauer was also a graduate of the FBI's 17th National Executive Institute.

== Police career ==
Lauer served with the New South Wales Police Force for forty-one years, as a General Duty uniform officer, Traffic Patrol cyclist, and in a wide range of criminal investigation duties. During his police service, Lauer had held the appointments of Chief Superintendent in Charge, Criminal Investigation Branch; Assistant Commissioner, Professional Responsibility; and Deputy Commissioner, State Commander.

Lauer succeeded to the position of Commissioner of Police, after the retirement of Commissioner John Avery, in March 1991. In February 1996, Lauer's term ended in controversy with his resignation soon after the start of the Wood Royal Commission into police corruption. He had stated, among other areas of the force, that the Kings Cross patrol was free of corruption, only for the Royal Commission to find that it was in fact extremely corrupt. Peter Ryan succeeded him in the position.

Lauer was a past President of the Police Association of NSW and was made a Life Member of the Association in 1983. He served as a member of the Police Board of NSW, the Operation Review Committee of the Independent Commission Against Corruption, and the Management Committee of the State Crime Commission. He was a Director of Police Bank Ltd. He was also a member of the Remuneration Committee and the Credit Committee of that Bank.

== Awards ==
Lauer underwent training in the Australian Army with the 19th National Service Training Battalion, Holsworthy, in 1957.

Lauer was named a Paul Harris Fellow by the Rotary Foundation of Rotary International in 1994. He was a long-standing Freemason, and served as Grand Master of the United Grand Lodge of New South Wales and the Australian Capital Territory from 2004 to 2006.

Australian Police Medal (APM)	1990 Australia Day Honours
Queen Elizabeth II Silver Jubilee Medal	1977
National Medal	1992
Police Long Service and Good Conduct Medal & 1 Bars	
Anniversary of National Service 1951–1972 Medal	2002

== Personal life ==
Lauer married Joy Stock in 1955; they had four children and numerous grandchildren.

== Notes ==
Police appointments
Preceded by John Avery	Commissioner of the New South Wales Police; 1991–1996	Succeeded by Peter Ryan
