= List of commissioners of the New South Wales Police =

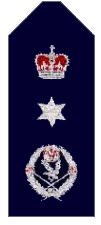

The Commissioner of the New South Wales Police Force (known from 1851 to 1926 as the Inspector-General of the New South Wales Police Force) is the head of New South Wales Police Force. The post is currently held by Mal Lanyon, who replaced Karen Webb on 1 October 2025. The rank is usually referred to as the New South Wales Police Commissioner or simply just "Commissioner". The New South Wales Police Force has had 23 commissioners since 1851.

== History ==
The role was established under the Colonial Police Act 1850, which provided for the appointment by the Governor of New South Wales of an Inspector-General of Police. This act was repealed with the passage of The Police Regulation Act of 1862, which amalgamated the various police forces in the colony into one force responsible to the Inspector-General in Sydney.

The first Inspector-General of Police was appointed on 1 January 1851. The title was changed to be titled "Commissioner" on 8 January 1926, although the official title would legally remain as "Inspector-General" until the passage of the Police Regulation (Amendment) Act 1935.

== List of inspectors-general and commissioners ==
Ordinal	Officeholder	Post nominals	Title	Term start	Term end	Time in office	Notes
1	William Spain		Inspector-General of Police	1 January 1851	31 December 1851	364 days	
2	Captain William Mayne		Inspector-General of Police	1 January 1852	17 September 1856	4 years, 260 days	
3	Captain John McLerie		Inspector-General of Police	28 October 1856	6 October 1874	17 years, 343 days	
4	Edmund Walcott Fosbery	CMG	Inspector-General of Police	7 October 1874	30 June 1904	29 years, 267 days	
5	Thomas Garvin	ISO	Inspector-General of Police	1 July 1904	31 December 1910	6 years, 183 days	
6	Ernest Charles Day		Inspector-General of Police	1 January 1911	9 January 1915	4 years, 8 days	
7	James Mitchell	CBE	Inspector-General of Police	1 January 1915	8 January 1926	15 years, 78 days	
7	James Mitchell	CBE	Commissioner of Police	9 January 1926	20 March 1930	15 years, 78 days	
8	Walter Henry Childs	MVO	Commissioner of Police	21 March 1930	23 March 1935	5 years, 2 days	
9	William John MacKay		Commissioner of Police	24 March 1935	22 January 1948	12 years, 304 days	
10	James Frederick Scott		Commissioner of Police	18 February 1948	13 October 1952	4 years, 238 days	
11	Colin Delaney	CVO, CBE, QPM	Commissioner of Police	14 October 1952	27 February 1962	9 years, 136 days	
12	Norman Allan	CMG, MVO, QPM	Commissioner of Police	28 February 1962	14 November 1972	10 years, 260 days	
13	Frederick Hanson	CBE, QPM	Commissioner of Police	15 November 1972	31 December 1976	4 years, 46 days	
14	Mervyn Wood	LVO, MBE, QPM	Commissioner of Police	1 January 1977	5 June 1979	2 years, 155 days	
15	Jim Lees	QPM	Commissioner of Police	17 October 1979	29 December 1981	2 years, 73 days	
16	Cecil Abbott	AO, QPM	Commissioner of Police	30 December 1981	7 August 1984	2 years, 221 days	
17	John Avery	AO, APM	Commissioner of Police	7 August 1984	12 March 1991	6 years, 217 days	
18	Tony Lauer	APM	Commissioner of Police	13 March 1991	19 September 1996	5 years, 190 days	
—	Neil Taylor	APM	Acting Commissioner of Police	20 February 1996	29 August 1996	191 days	
19	Peter Ryan	QPM	Commissioner of Police	30 August 1996	17 April 2002	5 years, 230 days	
20	Ken Moroney	AO, APM	Commissioner of Police	18 April 2002	31 August 2007	5 years, 135 days	
21	Andrew Scipione	AO, APM	Commissioner of Police	31 August 2007	31 March 2017	9 years, 212 days	
22	Mick Fuller	APM	Commissioner of Police	31 March 2017	31 January 2022	4 years, 306 days	
23	Karen Webb	APM	Commissioner of Police	1 February 2022	6 June 2025	3 years, 125 days	
—	Peter Thurtell	APM	Acting Commissioner of Police	9 June 2025	30 September 2025	113 days	
24	Mal Lanyon	APM	Commissioner of Police	1 October 2025	incumbent	1 year, 45 days	
