= Resilience NSW =

Disaster management agency

Agency overview
- Formed: 1 May 2020
- Preceding agency: Office of Emergency Management
- Dissolved: 16 December 2022
- Superseding agency: NSW Reconstruction Authority
- Jurisdiction: New South Wales
- Headquarters: Sydney, Australia
- Employees: 105
- Annual budget: $352m AUD (2021)
- Minister responsible: Steph Cooke, Minister for Emergency Services and Resilience
- Agency executive: Shane Fitzsimmons, Commissioner of Resilience NSW
- Parent department: Department of Communities and Justice
- Key document: Administrative Arrangements (Administrative Changes—Resilience NSW) Order 2020
- Website: www.nsw.gov.au/resilience-nsw

Resilience NSW was a Government of New South Wales executive agency within the Department of Premier and Cabinet, focused on disaster management and was responsible for disaster recovery and building community resilience to future disasters. It was established on 1 May 2020, following the 2019–20 Australian bushfire season a few months prior. It replaced the Office of Emergency Management, an office within the Department of Communities and Justice.

The agency was headed by Shane Fitzsimmons, who was previously the Commissioner of the New South Wales Rural Fire Service. The head of Resilience NSW reported to Minister for Emergency Services and Resilience. At the time, the Minister responsible was Steph Cooke.

== History ==
The Office of Emergency Management, an office within the Department of Communities and Justice was replaced by Resilience NSW on 1 May 2020 with the Administrative Arrangements (Administrative Changes—Resilience NSW) Order 2020 issued. Within this order Resilience NSW was established as a Public Service Executive Agency related to the Department of Premier and Cabinet with the following responsible ministers;

- Premier of New South Wales
- Deputy Premier of New South Wales
- Minister for Police and Emergency Services

On 1 April 2022 by the Administrative Arrangements (Second Perrottet Ministry—Transitional) Order 2021, Resilience NSW was transferred back to the Department of Communities and Justice under the Minister for Emergency Services and Resilience.

Following an inquiry into the response to the 2022 New South Wales floods, Resilience NSW was argued by the NSW State Government to be bureaucratic and ineffective, with the agency be dissolved, although noting that this claim of ineffectiveness is misaligned with feedback from first responders (e.g. in the SES, the RFS, and Local Area Commands). It has been replaced by the NSW Reconstruction Authority after legislation passed in November that year.
