= New South Wales Police Force Academy =

New South Wales Police Academy
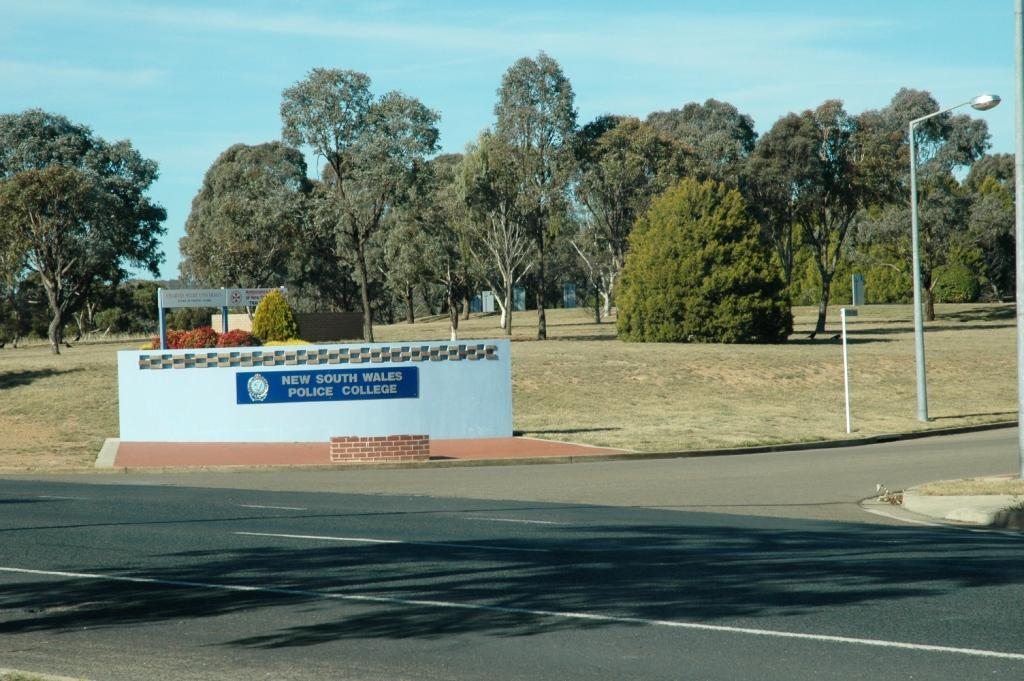
- Main entrance

Location
- Goulburn, New South Wales; Australia; 34.7336°S 149.7301°E

Information
- Type: Police Training
- Motto: Truth - Integrity - Knowledge
- Established: 1984
- Website: police.nsw.gov.au/recruitment

The New South Wales Police Academy, the sole provider of police training and education to probationary constables of the New South Wales Police Force, is located at the city of Goulburn in the Southern Tablelands of New South Wales, Australia.

Recruits undertaking studies at the academy are referred to as Student Police Officers.

The academy has significantly expanded the facilities and buildings in use and has a new site located on the Taralga Road which is used for police driver training purposes. This new site is known as Police Driver Training, which was previously based at St Ives. The library at the academy is referred to as the J. K. Avery Resource Centre in honour of the former Commissioner of Police John Keith Avery, who served in that position from 1984 to 1991. The year 1984 is of significance as that is the year that the then New South Wales Police Academy transferred to Goulburn, with Avery effectively being the first Commissioner of Police to oversee passing out parades at the newly located academy.

== Naming and History ==
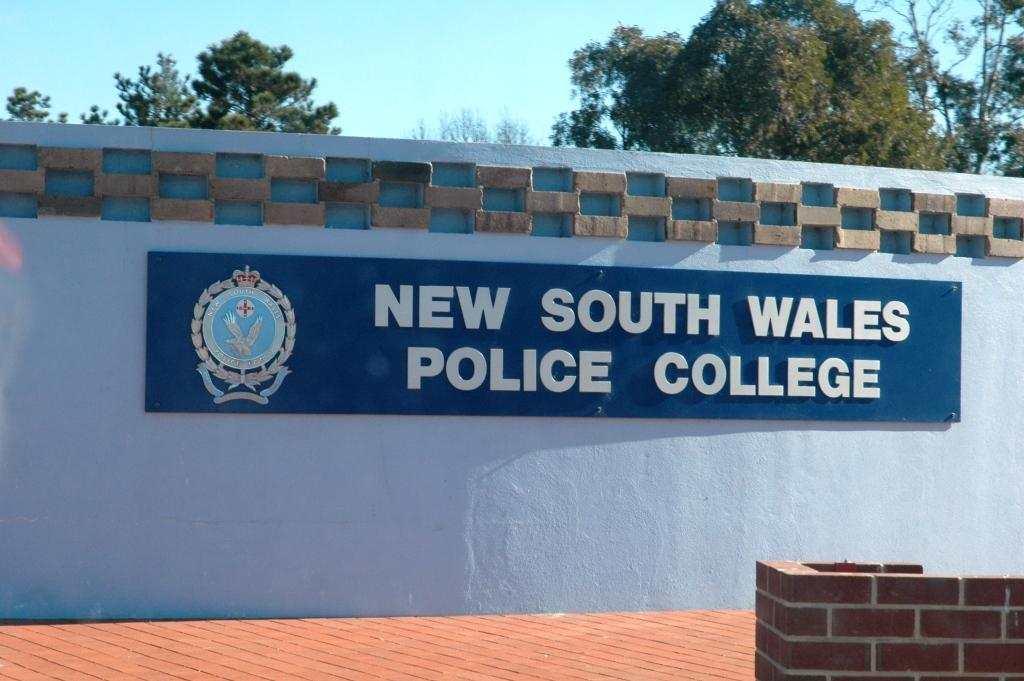
Entrance sign

In 2011, the Minister announced that the name of the academy would change from New South Wales Police College (held since 2002) to the New South Wales Police Academy.

Prior to shifting to Goulburn the academy was based at the inner Sydney suburb of Redfern for a number of years, from the 19th century, known as the Redfern Police Depot. The current front entry walls featured here, have exposed bricks, which are from the old Redfern Police Depot, linking the old with the new. The academy is situated on the banks of the Wollondilly River and the buildings were the former campus of the Goulburn College of Advanced Education, formerly known as Goulburn Teacher's College.

== Precincts ==
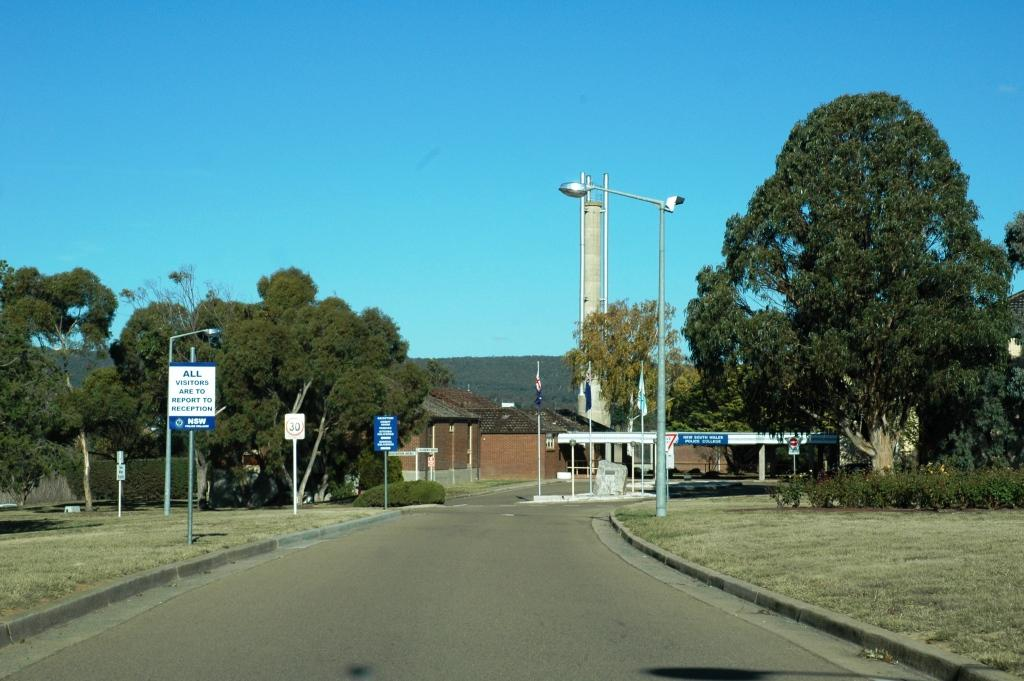
Buildings inside the academy grounds

=== Honour ===
Located within the Honour Precinct is an original ornate marble tablet featuring early losses of New South Wales Police Officers. The tablet is flanked by the New South Wales state flag and the New South Wales Police Force flag.

The Peacekeeping Display honours all members of the NSW Police Force who have served in peacekeeping operations throughout the world and houses the Dag Hammerskjold medal belonging to the late Sergeant Ian Donald Ward who died in UNFICYP. This was donated to the NSW Police College on 29 May 2010 from Mr Ken Ward, OAM, father of Sergeant Ward.

The Valour Award (VA) roll of honour lists all members of the NSW Police Force to receive the highest NSWPF in-service bravery decoration. The Honour Precinct also houses a framed replica set of all awards issued under the Australian Honours and Awards framework, and a framed replica set of all awards issued under the internal NSW Police Force Honours and Awards framework.

'Heroes' Walk' highlighting 15 stories of members of the NSW Police Force who have been awarded the nations highest gallantry decorations add substance and an emotional link to the otherwise stark surroundings of the college environment.

=== Heritage ===
In 2007, the In the Line of Duty - Policing in Australia 1788 - 2007 at the NSW Police College was installed in the main building of the college which houses lecture rooms. The original exhibition in which this was based, was housed for a short time in the Old Parliament House in Canberra, with NSW police specific banners added to complement the existing exhibition. This exhibition is a timeline of Australian policing history (www.inthelineofduty.com.au)

=== Memorial ===
Located in the Memorial Precinct of the NSW Police Academy is the eternal flame and memorial rose garden; the walls of remembrance; the Horse and Dog Memorial and the Constable Bush & McCunn In Memoriam display.

== External links s ==
- "NSW Police Academy". NSW Police Force.
- Callander, Retired SenCon Greg, Regd. # 17463. "[untitled]".
