= Australian Police Medal =

- Obverse of medal and ribbon
- Type: Medal
- Awarded for: distinguished service
- Presented by: Governor-General of Australia
- Eligibility: members of an Australian Police Force
- Post-nominals: APM
- Status: Currently awarded
- Established: 3 March 1986
- First award: 1986 Australia Day Honours

Highlights
- Total: 2,426

Order of Wear
- Next (higher): Public Service Medal (PSM)
- Next (lower): Australian Fire Service Medal (AFSM)

The Australian Police Medal (APM) is awarded for distinguished service by a member of an Australian police force. The APM was introduced in 1986, and replaced the Imperial King’s Police Medal for Gallantry and King’s Police Medal for Distinguished Service.

Awards are made by the Governor-General, on the nomination of the responsible federal minister or respective state premier or territory chief minister. Recipients of the Australian Police Medal are entitled to use the post-nominal letters "APM".

== Description ==
- The APM is a circular, nickel-silver medal ensigned with the Crown of St Edward. The front of the medal displays the effigy of the Sovereign on a Federation Star, superimposed over a pattern of fluted rays.
- The back of the medal is inscribed with the words ‘Australian Police Medal’ and ‘For Distinguished Service’. The inscriptions are encircled by a wreath of the national floral emblem, the golden wattle.
- The 32 millimetre-wide ribbon features a central vertical stripe of dark blue flanked by two white stripes.

== Eligibility ==
The total number of awards made each year must not exceed the following quota:

- One medal for every 1000 members, or part of 1000 members plus one additional medal.
- Must be a commissioned officer.
- For NSW recipients must be a Detective.
- One additional medal per calendar year for Covid-19 related work between 25 January 2020–25 January 2025.

The APM may be awarded to a member who has shown distinguished service when carrying out the primary functions of the organisation, particularly where the work has been inherently more hazardous than most other occupations. Members who recently worked on the frontline for a prolonged period of time and had exposure to hazard in the service of the community, and who are now using their frontline experience to support others on the frontline may also be considered. Awards of the APM may be made to former serving members for nominations submitted within 12 months of ceased service. Nominations must be submitted for serving members whilst living.

Nominations can be submitted by any member, regardless of rank, within the relevant organisation.

Nominations for the APM are submitted to a coordinating authority who consider the nominations and submit recommendations to the responsible Commonwealth, State or Territory Minister or Premier. The responsible Commonwealth, State or Territory Minister or Premier submit the recommendations to the Governor-General who has the authority to approve awards. The Australian Police Medal is usually awarded twice a year by the Governor-General.

== See also ==
- Australian Honours Order of Precedence
