= New South Wales Police Force strip search scandal (list of reported incidents) =

Following the introduction of a controversial law in 2001, New South Wales Police were given the power to deploy specially trained drug detection dogs at major public events, licensed venues and on selected routes across Sydney's public transport network. In 2006, a report published by the New South Wales Ombudsman found that these were significant issues with the way drug detection dogs were being used by NSW Police, including civil liberties concerns, false positives, and low rates of accuracy. At the time of the report's publication, most people stopped by the dogs had either been subjected to pat down search or a search of their belongings. The report mentioned cases of strip searches being conducted, however the Ombudsman noted that such incidents were rare at the time.

In late 2014, several stories were published alleging that NSW Police had routinely begun using indications from drug detection dogs as a justification for conducting strip searches. Since that time, there has been sporadic coverage of the issue through various news reports. Several firsthand accounts have been published on social media as well.

== 2006 ==
June – The New South Wales Ombudsman publishes a comprehensive review of the Police Powers (Drug Detection Dogs) Act 2001, legislation giving NSW Police the power to deploy specially trained drug detection dogs at large scale public events, licensed venues and on selected routes across Sydney's public transport network. Figures included in the report revealed that during a two-year review period between February 2002 and February 2004, officers had conducted just over 10,000 personal searches resulting from positive drug detection dog indications. Most of those searches were recorded as being either been a pat down search or a search of a person's belongings, however the report noted some cases of officers performing strip searches as well. The report mentioned two incidents which had been observed by the Ombudsman's office, one involving a woman who had been stopped inside a pub and another involving a man who had been stopped at a train station. In both of those cases, drugs and drug paraphernalia had been found before a strip search was conducted.

In another incident, a complaint had been made after a man had allegedly stopped by a drug detection dog twice within the space of a one-and-a-half-hour period. On the second occasion, the man said he had voluntarily accompanied officers to a police station where he had been "subjected to the humiliation of a strip search". It was alleged that one of the officers had suggested to the man that he "might have sat next to someone on a train or bus that had been smoking cannabis" after no drugs were found during the search. The report also mentioned another case which had been recorded on the police database. In that instance, a commuter had reportedly been strip searched inside a public toilet at a train station after an indication from a drug detection dog. The man had reportedly been allowed to leave after no drugs were found during the search.

== 2009 ==
February – The New South Wales Ombudsman publishes a final review of the Law Enforcement (Powers and Responsibilities) Act 2002, the legislation governing the powers given to police in New South Wales. One key aspect of the review were safeguards in relation to personal searches conducted by NSW Police. A number of case studies were referred to in the report, including one incident involving a drug detection dog operation which had been monitored by the Ombudsman's office. A summary of that incident read: "We observed frisk and ordinary searches performed on people attending a youth event who were indicated by a drug detection dog as they moved from the train station to the venue. On this occasion, police set up a number of tents, which provided six separate spaces in which searches could be conducted and advised us that this had been done to provide people with a level of privacy. Once an indication had been made, two police officers were introduced and the person was taken to a tent where the search was conducted. While we only observed frisk and ordinary searches, strip searches were also performed in the tents. We did not observe any searches outside the tents".

== 2010 ==
January 25 – Writing on Reddit, a commuter recalled being strip searched by police at Redfern Train Station after being stopped by a drug detection dog on his way home from work. After initially being patted down and having his belongings searched, the man said he was escorted to a public toilet by three officers, who had allegedly asked him to remove his clothes before instructing him to turn around, "bend over" and pull his buttocks apart. No drugs were found during the search, though the man admitted that he occasionally smoked cannabis. Writing in the comments he said, "I don't know... I might be wrong but what happened doesn't feel right".

== 2012 ==
January 25 – The Hack program on Triple J broadcasts a half hour special discussing the use of drug detection dogs at music festivals in New South Wales and other Australian states. The program heard from a number of callers who were searched by police in the aftermath of a positive drug detection dog indication, including some who were strip searched. Many of the callers had admitted to being in possession of small quantities of drugs when they were stopped by police.

== 2013 ==
March 7 – A 53-year-old man tells news.com.au that he had been strip searched while attending a Mardi Gras afterparty event at the Royal Botanical Gardens. The man said he had been stopped by a drug detection dog at the entrance of the event while picking up tickets for a friend. After being taken to a police search area, it's alleged that he was patted down before being told to drop his pants and underwear. The 53-year-old recalled that there was a gap in the tarpaulin covering the area where search was taking place, leaving him exposed to onlookers while this was happening. "They could see] my bare butt," he told news.com.au. "I was not comfortable with that at all". No drugs were reportedly found during the search. Speaking about the incident, the 53-year-old said "It's a complete abuse of their powers ... I feel embarrassed and humiliated." The man had subsequently launched legal action against New South Wales Police, with the matter later being settled out of court for an undisclosed amount. The incident was one of dozens of alleged cases of police misconduct which had reportedly taken place at the 2013 Mardi Gras Parade and subsequent afterparty celebrations.

== 2014 ==
October 10 – An article published by Vice reports that NSW Police have routinely been using drug detection dog indications as a justification for conducting strip searches, particularly at large scale events such as music festivals. In one instance, a 24-year-old man said he had been strip searched while volunteering at the Stereosonic music festival in 2013. The man had reportedly been stopped by a drug detection dog at the entrance of the event. "They took me into a little tent. I took off all my clothes. They're like, 'You don't have anything'" the 24-year-old recalled. "It was really humiliating. The fact that they didn't apologise was ridiculous and they were so aggressive with their questioning". In another instance, a 23-year-old student alleged that he had been strip searched three times over the past three years, twice at music festivals and once at King's Cross Train Station. On each occasion, he said he was in possession of a small amount of cannabis, which he claimed he had handed over to officers before the searches took place. In each instance, he was reportedly asked to remove his clothes, turn his back to police and squat. "It happens at festivals all the time. They've got booths set up to strip search you. It's basically a known thing that where there's sniffer dogs, they'll be strip searches as well" he said.

The article also featured an account from a 39-year-old man who had allegedly been strip searched at the 2012 Mardi Gras Toy Box party after being stopped by a drug detection dog. The man said he had informed officers he was in possession of ketamine before the search was conducted. "I was taken down into the holding pen. It was a fenced off area, with black plastic around chicken wire fencing. I was basically told to strip down. It was very intimidating, because I had these three cops in my face. I was basically bare-naked". Speaking about the issue, drug educator Paul Dillon, Director of Drug and Alcohol Training and Research Australia (DARTA) said: "I can remember one girl who was totally traumatised by the experience" ... "She'd been strip searched and was mortified. The girl had no drugs on her, was not a drug user, but had been through a very traumatic experience. That event got me to question... is the benefit worth the potential risks to people who have no contact with drugs?"

December 2 – The Sydney Morning Herald reports that strip searches following drug detection dog indications have risen 32% since 2009. An article titled "Police in the Doghouse over Strip Searches" featured firsthand accounts from two men who had allegedly been strip searched by police after being stopped during separate drug detection dog operations. Both men said they had admitted to being in possession of illicit substances before being searched. One man had reportedly been issued with a cannabis caution.

December 2 – Speaking to The Project, a 24-year-old commuter said he had been strip searched by police at Redfern Train Station after an indication from a drug detection dog. The man said he was on his way home when he was approached by four police officers who claimed they had seen him throw something into a rubbish bin. The 24-year-old said he had been speaking with the officers for several minutes before the dog sat down beside him. It's alleged that he was initially subjected to a pat down search in view of other commuters before having his belongings emptied out onto the ground. At the conclusion of this search, the 24-year-old recalled asking the officers, "Do you feel anything for the embarrassment you might have caused me in this public space?", stating that one replied, "You should be glad that we're keeping you safe". It's alleged that he was then taken to a private area where a strip search was conducted. "Well basically they just take all of your clothes off, they strip you down" ... "it's quite a degrading process" the 24-year-old said. "You actually get told to squat and you actually get told to cough". Speaking about the incident, he told presenters that, "I remember a quote somewhere, laws become unjust when they start to effect people that they weren't written to effect" ... "I think that's definitely the case with these laws".

== 2015 ==
28 March – Speaking to Vice, a 28-year-old man recalled being strip searched at a Mardi Gras afterparty event at Moore Park earlier that year after being stopped by a drug detection dog. "The handler was on the other side of the crowd. He made eye contact with me. I was nowhere near the dog, but as I was walking in and joined the line, he walked through the crowd towards me. He put his hand on my backpack before the dog even indicated and then the dog sat down," he said. It's alleged that the 28-year-old was then taken into a tent where he was questioned by officers. After having his bag searched, he was then reportedly made to "take off his clothes and squat". No drugs were reportedly found during the search. "It's anxiety provoking. I know a lot of people who avoid major parties like that because of the sniffer dogs, even if they're not planning on taking any drugs," the 28-year-old said. "If you have drugs or not, there's still the potential there to take you off and subject you to that humiliating experience."

May 31 – Buzzfeed News speaks to a 23-year-old medical student who was allegedly strip searched at the 2014 Defqon Music Festival after a drug detection dog indication. The man said he was stopped at the entrance of the event when the dog began "sniffing around his feet". It's alleged that he was then taken to a police search area, which he described as a "tent with makeshift cubicles made out of security fencing". After initially being directed to remove his shoes and empty his bag and pockets, the man said he was then told to take start taking off his clothes, alleging that police told him to "drop your daks" before instructing him to "pick up your balls and move them to one side". The man said he could hear another male festivalgoer undergoing a similar search in the cubicle next to him while this was happening. He was later released when no drugs were reportedly found. The 23-year-old described the incident as "embarrassing and humiliating", telling Buzzfeed that it "made for a shit start to a day that was supposed to be a fun day out with my mates".

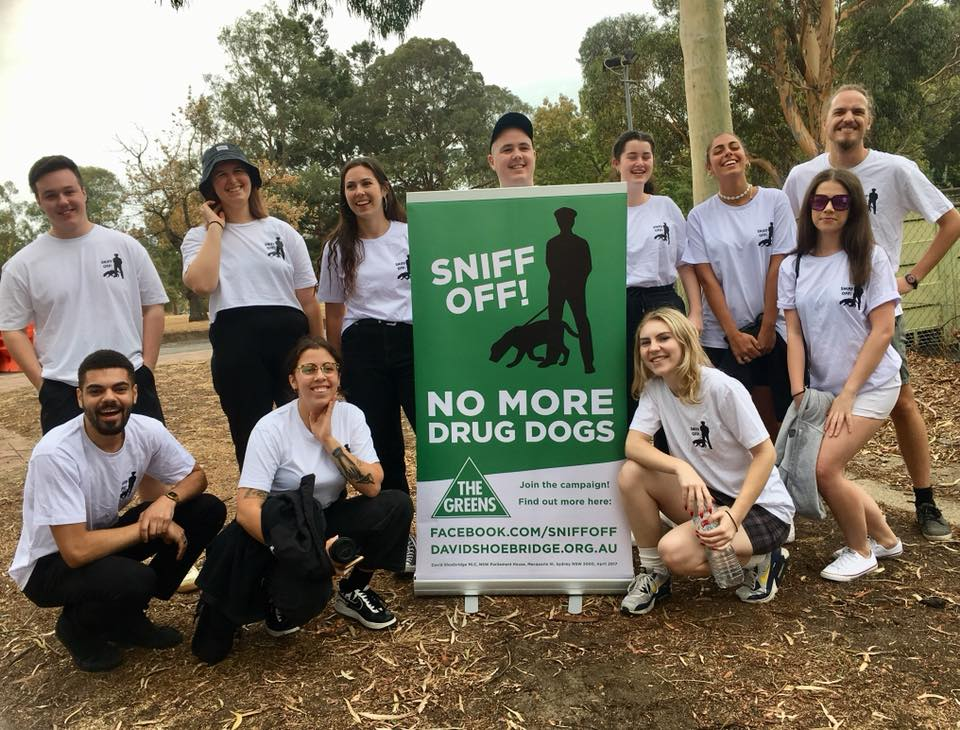
Sniff Off volunteers at the FOMO music festival in Parramatta in 2020

November 6 – In an article discussing the NSW Greens "Sniff Off" campaign, a 28-year-old electrician says he was strip searched by police at Ashfield Train Station after being stopped by a drug detection dog. Speaking to Vice, the man says he was initially patted down before being taken into a public toilet cubicle and asked to remove his clothes. Recalling the incident, he said that "having to get naked in a small space with a pair of large men with guns strapped to their hips was humiliating". The man claimed that he was deliberately targeted by police on the basis of his looks. "I walked past the dog, then the cop grabbed me and asked me to come back," ... "the dog wasn't really that interested, but then the cop was like, 'The dog's detected drugs on you'". The 28-year-old said he had later spoken to another man of similar appearance who was also searched despite having no drugs on his person.

November 28 – A performer says she was made to squat naked in front of a female police officer while being strip searched at the 2011 Parklife Music Festival in Sydney. Speaking to music industry website HowlandEchoes, the woman said she was stopped at the entrance of the event after a drug detection dog "decided to take an interest " in her bag. "A cop took me into a prison wagon and made me strip naked, squat... the whole nine-yards. I'd started crying in my show make-up, angry and humiliated that somehow I had no consent in this process. She tried to make small talk with me while my clothes were in a pile against the bars and I'm barefoot on the well-trodden muddy floor".

Describing what happened next, the woman said, "they pulled all my belongings outside onto the muddy ground and went through everything with a fine tooth comb. Nothing. They turn to my costume bag and start pulling everything out onto the dirty ground. Seeing the delicate tulle of my dress covered in mud sent me in near hysterics. I found my voice and insisted they search on a cleaner surface. The male cop ignored me. The female who had searched my body finally took pity and suggested he put the tentacle pieces on the bonnet of the car. His response? Open the stitching on one of the pieces and pull out the stuffing. He shrugged. "You've could have stored something in there". Speaking about the experience, the woman said, "it was violating, destructive and left me totally shaken for weeks".

December 2 – The Hack Program on Triple J speaks to two women who were allegedly strip searched on their way to the Strawberry Fields music festival near the New South Wales – Victoria Border. It's not stated whether the officers involved in the alleged incident were members of New South Wales Police or Victoria Police, though a subsequent report suggested that it may have been the latter. Responding to the story, a caller to the program said he was made to undergo a similar search at a music festival in Sydney. "I was searched at Stereosonic 2014. I had to do some very embarrassing things like take all my clothes off, then I was asked to bend over and squat, then I was actually asked to bend my testicles and my shaft and separate them in case I was hiding anything there and pull back my foreskin". He said he was not carrying any illicit substances and had initially been stopped by police after attempting to move out of the path of a drug detection dog.

Texting into the program, another listener wrote: "My friend had no drugs, was told to strip and squat by New South Wales Police, they even made her remove her tampon".

== 2016 ==
November 19 – An article published on the Triple J Hack website features a Q and A about the legal rights of patrons at music festivals. One person asks: "My friend had a sniffer dog sit next to him at Big Day Out. So they took him into a back tent and [asked him to] squat and even cough to see if anything came out. I couldn't believe it and said 'Is that legal?' They said yes because the sniffer dog gave them reasonable doubt that my friend had drugs on him".

== 2017 ==
May 8 – In an article published by University of Sydney newspaper Honi Soit, a 25-year-old political staffer recalled being strip searched by police at the Secret Garden music festival in February earlier that year. The woman had reportedly been stopped by a drug detection dog at the entrance of the event. "The dog was interested in me and sniffing me. It never sat down — something I understood to a be a positive indication" she said. The 25-year-old had reportedly been taken into a tent by two female police officers, who had then instructed her to remove her clothing. She said she initially took off her shorts before stopping "in the hope that reason would prevail", at which point the officers had told her to "keep going". It's alleged that she was made to perform a naked squat before having to ask to put her clothes back on and collect her belongings, which had been "scattered across the tent floor" by police. "They definitely didn't say sorry. They had no sense that they'd put me through any kind of humiliating or uncomfortable situation. They weren't treating humans like humans," she said.

November 14 – Buzzfeed News reports allegations from two women who said they were strip searched after attending a pro-refugee rally at in Eveleigh. The women, aged 51 and 43, said they were arrested by police when the protest moved into the inner-city suburb of Redfern. It's alleged that officers had cited a "failure to move on" as the reason for the arrest before transporting the pair to Newtown police station. "I was informed that they would need to conduct a strip-search and this was for my protection because I was in their care and custody and there might be something on my person I could hurt myself with" one of the women said. "I was asked to turn around and squat and asked if I had any contraband". It's alleged that the other woman was made to remove her bra but refused a request to remove her underwear. "They said 'take off the bra' at which I was incredulous and then they said 'jewellery and shoes' and asked me to take off my underwear," she told BuzzFeed. "I said 'this is ridiculous, I have my period' and so they did a pat down". Both women were later released without charge.

Complaints made by the two women were later the subject of separate internal investigations by NSW Police, who initially recommended that "not sustained" findings be made against the officers who had strip searched the pair. Following the intervention of the Law Enforcement Conduct Commission in May 2018, a subsequent police investigation recommended that "sustained" findings be made against both officers. Earlier sustained findings had already been made against the officer who had ordered that the strip searches be conducted (see Law Enforcement Conduct Commission investigations). In September 2019, it was reported that NSW Police had issued a formal apology for the "distress and embarrassment" caused by the incident, agreeing to settle a civil case launched by the two women for an undisclosed amount.

December 28 – Speaking to the Hack program on Triple J, one woman said that she and a friend were strip searched by police at a music festival earlier in the year after being stopped by an undercover officer. "Their rationale for pulling us aside was that I tried to avoid the sniffer dogs. This may sound silly but I am genuinely afraid of dogs and I'm not surprised that I unknowingly avoided them. They strip searched us and I was even asked to squat. As a female it was grossly degrading to go through, and they found nothing on us".

== 2018 ==
May 1 – Writing for news.com.au, a man says that he was made to strip to his underwear at the Groovin the Moo music festival after an indication from a drug detection dog.

May 29 – The District Court of New South Wales hands down a judgement in the case of a 53-year-old man who had been strip searched at Kings Cross police station in 2015. The 53-year-old had been detained in Darlinghurst in the early hours of March 24 after being approached by three police officers. He was later transported to Kings Cross Police Station where during a strip search he had been made to "strip to a naked state, squat and expose his genitals". In handing down his ruling, District Court Justice Phillip Taylor found that the officers involved had acted with "an almost reckless indifference" before awarding the man $112,387 in damages plus legal costs. "The state's concession in relation to the strip-search illustrates that the police officers have used a most invasive power without the slightest justification," he said.

The incident was later the subject of an investigation by the Law Enforcement Conduct Commission. In a final report handed down in May 2020, the Commission found that the actions of the senior constable who had made the decision to detain the man and ordered he be strip searched amounted to "serious misconduct", suggesting that the woman was "indifferent to the legal limits of her powers as a police officer" (see Operation Sandbridge).

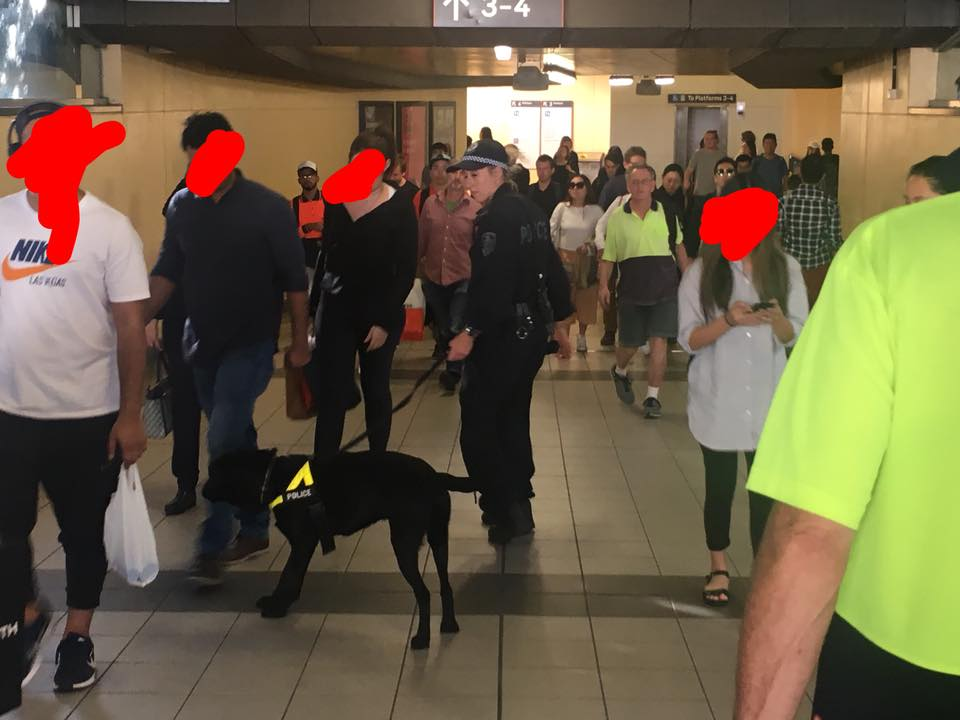
A drug detection dog at Wolli Creek Train Station in 2018

June 7 – The ABC reports on an upcoming legal challenge being mounted by the New South Wales Greens in response to a proposed plan by NSW Police to deny entry to ticketholders at an upcoming performance by Above and Beyond at Sydney Showground that weekend. Speaking to the ABC, one man recalled being strip searched a music festival several years earlier. "The police officer who was speaking to me said that the dog had indicated that I had drugs on me. And I was like 'Oh, I don't have anything on me'. They wanted to search my wallet and bag I was like 'fine, totally, have a look through it, nothing in there'". It's alleged that police then informed the man that he would be taken to a van to be strip searched. "Everyone walking into the festival can see that you're being escorted over to the van to be searched. So I go over there, more questioning, you have to take off all your clothes, one by one and they search all the lining of all the clothes and then you have to bend over and they search shining a torch into cavities, I had to lift my scrotum, the police search every little bit of me". He told the ABC that the experience was "humiliating".

June 10 – SBS News speaks to a woman who was allegedly denied entry to the Above and Beyond performance at Sydney Showground after being strip searched by police. The woman said she was made to "strip and squat" after being stopped by a drug detection dog. "I feel a bit traumatised 'cos like I walked past and then there were just like cops stopping me, and then they're like really intimidating you during the whole strip search. They ask you a lot of questions". The woman had reportedly been ejected from the venue despite no drugs being found.

June 12 – The Hack program on Triple J speaks to a ticketholder who had allegedly been banned from the Sydney Olympic Park precinct for six months after being strip searched by police at the Above & Beyond performance on June 9. The man had reportedly been stopped by a drug detection dog on his way into the event. "I tried to get into the venue with my friends, the dog went up to me once didn't detect went away and comes back... it sat, three officers took me into a side room and searched me," he recalled. "They made me squat and cough and all that... they didn't find anything because there wasn't anything... and then I was issued with a six month ban from the venue." It's alleged that after searching the man, police asked to see his ticket, but he refused. "I didn't want to show them my ticket because it's my private property and I felt like my rights had been violated enough".

A photo of the six month ban notice issued to the man was circulated on social media after the event. Responding to questions from news.com.au, NSW Police denied suggestions that he was banned from the venue on the basis of a positive drug dog indication, instead citing "bad behaviour" while also claiming that the man did not have a ticket for the event. A Sniff Off volunteer who had spoken to the man in the aftermath of the incident disputed those claims, instead suggesting that the notice had been issued because the man and his group of friends were arguing with the officers who conducted the strip search.

June 16 – A woman who had attended the Above and Beyond performance at Sydney Showground on June 9 recalled being strip searched and ejected from the event after police had observed her handing a fifty-dollar note to her boyfriend. Speaking to entertainment news website goat.com.au, the woman said she had given him the money to buy drinks when she was approached by a group of officers. "They just said 'We can't speak to you here, put your hands in a fist behind your back, come outside and we will explain everything'" she recalled. "They took my bag and everything off me [including my phone] and sent me straight to a booth to be searched" ... "I'd already asked multiple times 'Why am I here, what's going on? But [the female officer performing the search] kept saying 'Not sure, I wasn't in there'". It's alleged that another officer then entered the booth to speak with the female officer outside. "She comes back in and says 'It's been reported that you were involved in a drug deal". The woman said that the female officer then proceeded to conduct a strip search, at one point asking her to squat while the search was taking place. "I honestly felt so uncomfortable, and absolutely violated – which she could see – so she then made the comment 'It's more uncomfortable for me, don't worry!'". The woman alleged that police later went through her phone before ejecting her from the event after claiming that she was intoxicated.

August 3 – Writing on his personal blog, drug educator Paul Dillon, Director of Drug and Alcohol Research and Training Australia (DARTA), recalled a conversation he'd had with a 16-year-old girl during a school presentation several weeks earlier. The Year 11 student, who he referred to as "Clare", had allegedly been strip searched by police after being stopped by a drug detection at a music festival. Speaking about the interaction, he wrote:

She doesn't remember the initial 'pat-down' or what was said at that time. It wasn't until the next stage of the process that she even realized what was happening. She was taken by two female officers to what she thinks was a small tent. It was at this point that it dawned on her that this had to do with drugs. She kept telling the officers that she didn't take drugs and that she had nothing on her but was repeatedly told that the dog had detected a substance and that "the dogs were never wrong"! She was then asked to remove her clothing, piece by piece, one officer in front of her and another behind. Not surprisingly, nothing was found.

Dillon recalled that the girl was "clearly distressed" as spoke with him, writing that "she had not told her family what had happened and had not really talked about the experience with anyone. It was now even 'off limits' with the girls who attended the festival with her. She wanted to talk to me because she wanted to know why this had happened to her".

November 13 – Speaking to the ABC, a woman said she was left feeling "anxious and paranoid' after being wrongly strip searched at a music festival. It's alleged that her ticket was confiscated by police despite no drugs being found. "Even though I don't carry anything, what's the chances of me getting forced into the booth and strip searched and then be refused entry again?" she said.

October 1 – Writing on Facebook, a woman said that a young female acquaintance was left feeling "distraught" and "humiliated" after being strip searched at the Yours and Owls music festival in Wollongong in the aftermath of a drug detection dog indication. It's alleged that the woman was made to "strip naked in front of other girls" and had her "privates rubbed" by police during the incident. No illicit substances were reportedly found during the search.

November 12 – The ABC reports that the state's newly established police watchdog, the Law Enforcement Conduct Commission, would be launching a formal investigation into the use strip searches by NSW Police, citing an increase in complaints surrounding the practice. The report featured a firsthand account from a woman who had allegedly been strip searched by police while celebrating her 21st birthday in the city. The woman had reportedly been attempting to adjust her clothing when she said she noticed two men looking at her. "They were in, like all black clothing. They were both just standing outside the female bathrooms, staring. They weren't talking to anyone, they weren't really talking to each other. I got really, really nervous, I was just really uncomfortable" she recalled.

The woman said she had entered the toilets with a female friend to adjust her leotard, alleging that when she came out, she was approached by the two men, who revealed themselves as undercover police officers. Speaking to The Project on Network 10 in December, she said that "one of the officers came and he was like 'you're looking really suspicious we believe that you have drugs on you". It's alleged that the woman was then taken into a police van where two female police officers had conducted a strip search. "It just involves you taking off all your clothing, everything, and you get quite close so like I had to lift my breasts up so then, I wasn't hiding anything, like I guess underneath my cleavage. Take my underwear off and they kind of like had to get eye level and just have a look around, see if anything was hanging out or anything like that". No drugs were reportedly found and the woman was later released.

Speaking to The Project in October 2019, the woman said, "I think the entire time I was in quite a lot of shock but as soon as the strip search was over I burst into tears, I still think about it all the time, it's just something that we'll forget overnight it's something that sticks with us for a very, very long time".

December 18 – Speaking in support of Redfern Legal Centre's Safe and Sound Campaign, DJ Mark Dynamix says that heavy handed policing at music events in New South Wales is "destroying the relationship between young people and police". "My mate got strip searched a couple of months ago after a detection by a dog. Nothing was found on him. I'm not surprised because as far as I know he has never taken a drug in his life and was yet another false reading which ruined this person's day out and raised inaccurate questions about his reputation in front of his peers".

December 20 – Redfern Legal Centre's Samantha Lee speaks to the Hack program on Triple J about the use of strip searches by NSW Police. She said that one of her clients had been made to strip naked in front of two female police officers after being stopped by a drug detection dog at a music festival. "The dog didn't sit down and indicate [positively for drugs] but the person was escorted to a cubicle and searched," she said. "There was a table, they asked her to put her hands on the table, they then searched her bag, they then asked her to remove all of her clothing. They then inspected her body and continued questioning her while being strip searched. At the end of this process, nothing was found on her but she was then escorted off the premises and her ticket was confiscated".

== 2019 ==
January 9 – Speaking to news.com.au, a festivalgoer recalled being strip searched at a music festival after being stopped by a drug detection dog. The man said he was entering the event with his fiancé and 18-year-old brother when they were approached by police. "We were walking to the entrance when an officer clicked his fingers at my fiancée and told the dog to sit". It's alleged that the man was told he would be arrested if he refused to submit to a strip search. "The whole time were treated like criminals and the police officers were aggressive, calling us liars," he said. "My brother was a little scared he was going to miss his first ever event." No drugs were reportedly found, and the man said the experience made him feel "violated and cautious of authorities".

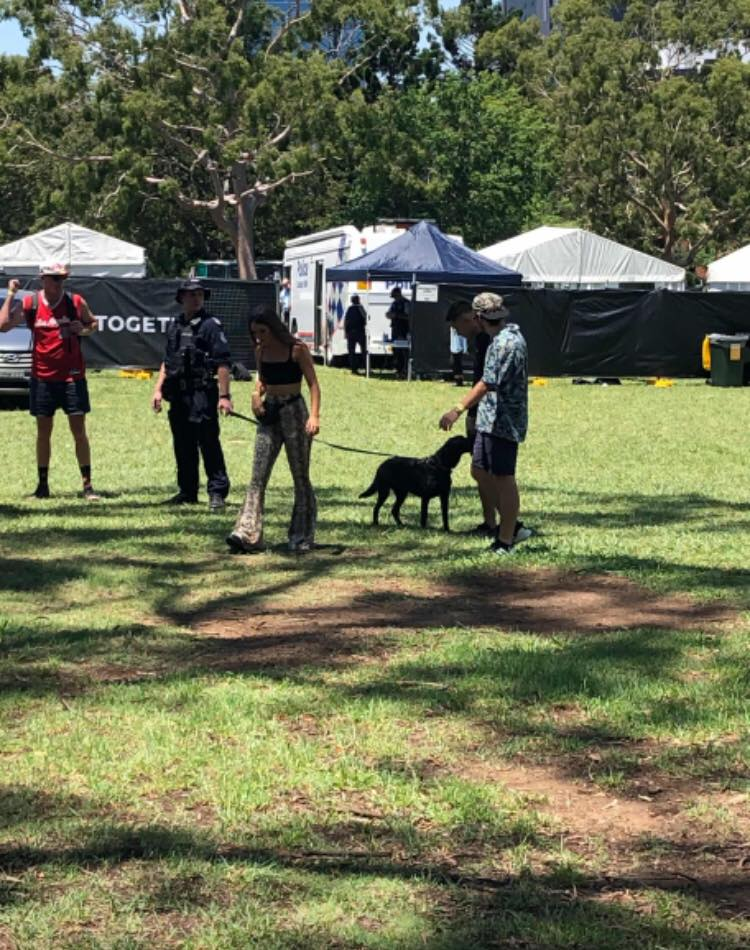
A drug detection dog at the FOMO music festival in Parramatta in 2019

January 25 – Speaking to Buzzfeed News, two festivalgoers recalled being strip searched by police at separate music festivals in the aftermath of drug detection dog indications. In one incident, a 25-year-old man said he had been stopped by officers on his way into an event at Sydney Olympic Park in 2016. "They started accusing me of being really nervous and shaky," he recalled. "At that point I had about four police officers surrounding me." The man said he was taken to a "cordoned-off area with a number of cubicles", where officers had allegedly searched his outer clothing and bag before taking him into a cubicle and instructing him to remove his clothes. "They ask you to lift up your genitals, my penis and whatever, to show it to them. Then I had to turn around, squat down, and get back up" he recalled.

Several months later, the same man said he was again stopped by police when a drug detection dog had "leapt on to him" as he was preparing to enter the Midnight Mafia music festival, which was also being held at Sydney Olympic Park. It's alleged that officers had told the man he "looked nervous" before leading him away to be strip searched. The 25-year-old claimed that on this occasion, the door of the booth had been left open while the search was being conducted, recalling that when he asked police to close it, he was told that "it didn't matter and that nobody was looking". Speaking about the incident, he said the experience made him feel "powerless", telling Buzzfeed that "you're completely naked in front of two police officers who really have the ability to decide your night".

Also speaking to Buzzfeed, a 19-year-old woman who had attended the Midnight Mafia music festival in 2018 recalled being strip searched at the event after being approached by a drug detection dog. "I was feeling a bit uneasy because I understand if the dog sits down that's a reasonable excuse to take me to the back, but it had, what, two sniffs, and then it's accusing me of carrying things," she said.

It's alleged that the 19-year-old was taken to an area inside the venue where police had set up a van and several tables. Despite reportedly insisting that she wasn't carrying any illicit drugs, the woman said she was taken into a booth with two female police officers, which she described as being reminiscent of a "larger toilet cubicle". It's alleged that the officers had initially searched her bag before asking her to remove her jacket. Recalling what happened next, she said "And then they asked me to take off my shirt and then my shorts," ... "And then my socks inside out with my shoes. And then I was completely naked". It's alleged that one of the officers had spotted a string between the woman's legs, with the 19-year-old recalling that she told the officer, "Oh, that's a tampon" when asked what it was. Speaking about the incident, the woman said it was "humiliating and embarrassing", telling Buzzfeed that "I was feeling violated and very upset". It's alleged that the 19-year old's ticket was cancelled and she was ejected from the event despite no drugs being found. The woman told Buzzfeed she was considering making an official complaint against NSW Police, stating that "I don't ever want to go through that process again or wish it upon anyone else. [The police are] supposed to serve and protect us but I felt really unsafe".

February 11 – Speaking to TheMusic.com.au, a festival patron recalled being ejected from the Knockout Circuz music festival after being strip searched in the aftermath of a drug detection dog indication. "They then pull me out of the line and told me to get into my underwear. They searched my clothes and found no drugs on me. I was then told that I wouldn't be allowed to enter the festival. I asked the policeman why I wasn't allowed in and they told me it was the venue policy" they said. "I later found out it wasn't the venue policy, it was police policy. I did get refunded and HSU were very apologetic and assured [me] this would not happen again" they said.

February 26 – It's reported on social media that a 21-year-old performer was strip searched by police at the secret garden music festival in South-Western Sydney after an indication from a drug detection dog. No drugs were reportedly found during the incident and it' was alleged that after the search had been completed, a male officer had jokingly threatened to arrest the woman before laughing when she became upset. "Shout out to the cops at Secret Garden festival for STRIP searching my artist on her way in to perform, giving her the all clear, stopping her AGAIN to tell her they were going to be "pressing charges" then laughing & telling her to learn to take a joke when she got upset" said the woman's manager in a post uploaded to Facebook.

The incident later formed part of a wider internal Investigation conducted by NSW Police in relation to complaints of unlawful strip searches (see Strike Force Blackford Report). That investigation had been overseen the Law Enforcement Conduct Commission. In a complaint made by the woman's parents, it was alleged that the 21-year-old had been taken into a tent and made to "pull her underpants down and bend over". In findings published in July 2020, police investigators found that there was "no apparent justification" for strip searching the woman, alleging that the officer who had conducted the search was under the belief "that she had been directed to search all persons upon whom the drug dogs had detected". When questioned about the matter, the officer claimed to have no specific recall of the incident, telling investigators that "I don't recall the female herself at all. I recall on the day I strip searched a lot of females. And the majority of those females I witness(ed) (sic) the drug dog indicate on". It was also acknowledged that after the search had been completed, a male officer had spoken to the woman, making comments to the effect that "the drug dog sat for you again, we will have to press charges", while other officers had laughed and told the 21-year-old that she should "take a joke". Speaking to investigators, the officer had conceded that his comments were "inappropriate and unprofessional", claiming that he was attempting to "make light of a difficult situation". The report found that the officer's conduct had constituted a "breach of the NSWPF Code of Conduct and Ethics".

March 3 – Writing on Medium, a performer who had attended the final Secret Garden Music Festival in South-Western Sydney discussed the police operation at the event. The man had spoken to a 21-year-old woman who had allegedly been strip searched by officers after an indication from a drug detection dog. The woman had been charged with drug possession after attempting to conceal cannabis internally. "We were all visibly anxious and the police were talking to us about how angry drugs and liars make them, they were also making comments about how much they liked the girls in tiny shorts. When I was searched they told me they knew I had something and made the dog sniff me separately first. I was made to get completely naked and squat down, and then the officer told me to pull my ass cheeks apart. They then made me remove the drugs I had inside myself, told me to get dressed, and took me away for questioning". Speaking about the experience, the 21-year-old said, "I have never felt more dehumanised in my life. I am still quite anxious now, as someone who has never been to court or had much interaction with the police".

The man had also spoken to a solicitor who was operating a legal advice stall at the festival. Commenting on the police operation, she said it was "beyond noticeable and substantially harsher than other events. I have no doubt it was designed to intimidate". The woman said she had spoken to a number of festivalgoers who had been strip searched at the event. "Some that approached us were distraught, having been subjected to a strip search in what they describe as particularly degrading circumstances. Most notably, in police tents with entrances that didn't close and afford proper privacy. Others described friends being whisked away to police stations and not having a clue how to help or contact them. That police don't explain this to young people increases their distress".

March 5 – Writing on Facebook, a 19-year-old woman said she was left feeling "humiliated and embarrassed" after being strip searched by police at the Hidden music festival at Sydney Olympic Park the previous weekend. The woman had reportedly been made to strip naked and "squat and cough" inside a booth at the event after being stopped by a drug detection dog. It was also alleged that the door of the booth had been left open while the search was being conducted, leaving the woman exposed to police and other festivalgoers outside. Despite no illicit drugs being found, the 19-year-old had been issued with a 'ban notice' prohibiting entry to the Sydney Olympic Park precinct for 6 months. A recount of the incident uploaded to Facebook had gone viral, attracting more than 13,000 reactions and over 3000 comments, with many users alleging that they had been subjected to similar treatment by NSW Police. Several media outlets also reported the story.

A complaint made by the 19-year old's mother later formed part of a wider internal investigation into allegations of unlawful strip searches conducted by NSW Police. That investigation had been undertaken by officers from the Force's Professional Standards Command and was overseen by the Law Enforcement Conduct Commission (see Strike Force Blackford Report). In findings handed down in July 2020, police investigators found that there was "insufficient lawful basis" for both the strip search and the 6 month ban notice that had been issued to the woman at the event. It was also acknowledged that the door of the booth used to conduct the search had been left open, with the report noting that "in terms of the location provided to conduct the searches... the doors were unable to be fully closed as they apparently locked automatically", suggesting that "officer safety required the door to remain unlocked". Police investigators had recommended that "sustained" findings be made against two officers in relation to the ban notice, however it was unclear if any disciplinary action would be pursued in relation to the strip search conducted on the 19-year-old. The Commission recommended that NSW Police consider issuing an apology to the woman.

In an article published by The Guardian in June 2020, it was revealed that one of the officers involved in the incident had since resigned, while another had been "counselled by a senior officer and referred for additional training". Speaking to the Guardian, the woman's mother said that the family had not been informed of the outcome of the investigation by NSW Police. "All we've ever really wanted was for them to admit that they didn't follow their procedures, and that what they'd done wasn't what they were supposed to do," she said. "For me, I know they're not all bad, but you know it just feels like I've brought up my children to respect police and feel like they're there to protect you and I don't feel that's the case any more. That's really hard for me. I work in childcare and I have to tell these children the police are the good guys when that's not what I feel any more".

March 7 – In a Reddit thread discussing 19-year-old's Facebook post, one user recalled that a family member had been subjected to similar search at a separate event. It's alleged that the woman had been made to squat naked over a mirror by police after being stopped by a drug detection dog. "A similar incident also happened to my cousin at a festival last year. On entry to the event, the officer walked past her with the dog and the dog did not sit. He walked past her again, and again the dog did not sit and yet she was told to come with him. She was courteous (she hates confrontation and never wants to do the 'wrong' thing). She was breath tested, drug tested, strip searched and asked to squat over a mirror. All tests clear (because she really didn't have anything on her). She was then breath tested and drug tested a second time, you know, just in case the first tests were somehow wrong). After complying and being proven to have not broken any laws, she was still escorted out of the event, with her hands being held behind her back and told she was not allowed back in. The officer ended the interaction by saying 'you and people like you are the reason why people die at these events'".

March 10 – A story printed in The Daily Telegraph reported on the use of drugs at music festivals in New South Wales. Speaking to the Telegraph, two women recalled being strip searched at the Groovin the Moo and Rolling Loud music festivals, describing their experiences as "scary" and "invasive". "A dog came up to me and sat down, which was terrifying, then two female police officers strip-searched me," one of the women said.

May 2 – A study published by RMIT criminology researcher Dr Peta Malins highlighted a number of issues relating to the use of drug detection dogs by police. Writing in the International Journal of Drug Policy, Malins found that the presence of the dogs at music festivals increased the risk of overdoses and did not deter attendees from consuming illicit substances. As part of her research, Malins had interviewed 22 festivalgoers who had been searched by police after positive drug detection dog indications at music festivals in New South Wales and Victoria, including some were strip searched. "Strip search experiences were particularly traumatic, disempowering and dehumanising," she said in relation to the study's findings. "The trauma associated with any of these searches, but particularly strip searches, can be long-lasting, so not only affecting people for the rest of that day, but also into the future".

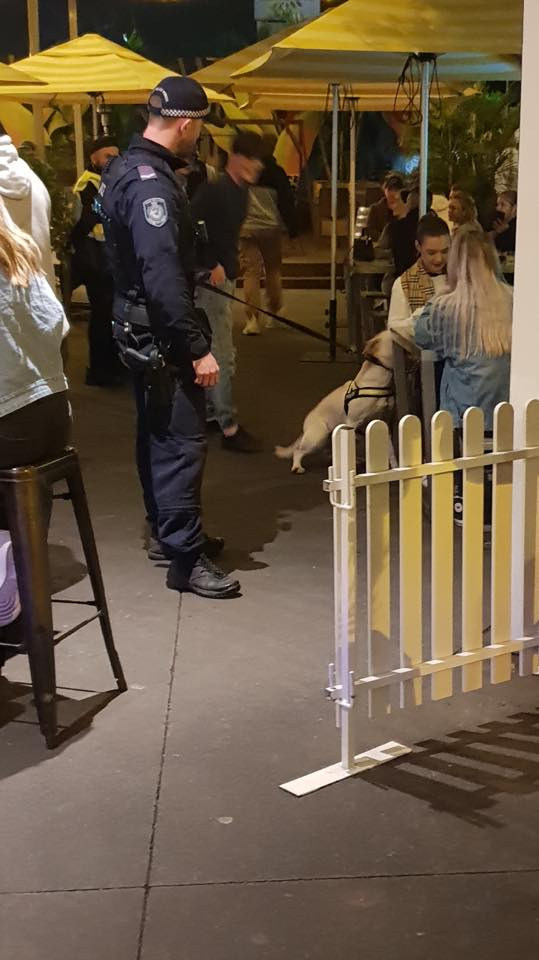
A drug detection dog at a pub in Bangor in 2019

One participant had described the experience of being strip searched as "the most embarrassing and invasive process in my life", while another had said that "being ordered to strip, it felt ... dehumanising ... it put images in my mind of being a prisoner". Describing her own experience, one woman recalled, "I was in the corner ... my back against the wall, and I was just shaking because I thought strip-search meant cavity search, and I was saying "you don't have the right to touch my body! I don't give you permission to touch my body! ... I thought she was going to pin me down and put her hands inside my body". The woman had reportedly suffered ongoing trauma as a result of the incident.

May 11 – A 22-year-old man recalled being strip searched at the Midnight Mafia music festival after an officer had accused him of being on drugs. Speaking to Yahoo news, the 22-year-old said he was lining up with friends to enter the event when he was singled out by police. "A police officer grabs me by the arm and links arms with me as he drags me away," ... "He said: 'Mate you're chewing your face off, we're going to have to search you'". The 22-year-old claimed that he then attempted to explain the situation. "I pulled out my gum and told him I'm chewing gum but he said 'you're obviously under the influence'". After being questioned by officers, he said he was told he would need to submit to a strip search. "I was really eager to get into the festival so I was like 'lets do this'".

No drugs were reportedly found on the man, and it was alleged that a senior officer had refused him entry to the event after the search had been completed. "He said 'I'm still going to void your ticket because I believe you're under the influence'". When the officer had reportedly asked the man why his pupils were dilated, he recalled telling the officer that he was "nervous" because of the search. It was later alleged that another officer had told the 22-year-old he would be allowed to enter the event if he purchased another ticket, reportedly doing so because he had been "co-operative" during the incident. After reportedly spending $150 to purchase another ticket, the 22-year-old said he was allowed to the venue, telling Yahoo news he was "pissed off" about what had happened. "If they thought I was under the influence why would they let me back in?" he said. A statement issued by NSW Police after the event revealed that officers had searched a total of 272 patrons, 32 of whom were charged with drug possession offences. It's not clear what percentage of the 272 searches conducted at the event were strip searches.

May 11 – Writing on Facebook, a man said that he and his girlfriend were strip searched by police before being ejected from the Midnight Mafia music festival at Sydney Showground earlier that evening. Neither were reportedly carrying any illicit drugs. A journalist covering the event had spoken to the pair and the incident was later reported by The Sunday Telegraph. The matter was investigated by NSW Police as part of a wider investigation into complaints of unlawful strip searches. The findings of that investigation were published by the Law Enforcement Conduct Commission in July 2020 (see Strike Force Blackford Report).

June 4 – The Sydney Morning Herald speaks to a 20-year-old woman who had allegedly been strip searched at the Midnight Mafia music festival in 2018. The woman had reportedly been the victim of a sexual assault and said the experience of being "cornered" in a booth with two female police officers was a refresher of the incident. "I had to be stripped naked and I felt completely helpless, and I was scared" the 20-year-old recalled. "It was horrible, that's how they made me feel. All I wanted was to go to the music festival". It was alleged that the woman's ticket had been confiscated by police despite no drugs being found, with a refund being issued by organisers after the event.

June 18 – The ABC reports on the increasing use of strip searches by NSW Police. The story featured an account from a 23-year-old woman who was allegedly made to strip naked in front of a female police officer at a music festival earlier in the year. Recalling the incident, the woman said, "I was strip searched in a booth this year. The female officer took me over to the metal round hut, conducted the strip search, even made me squat, looked behind my hair my feet everything. I felt like I was going into jail. The whole strip search made me a bit scared. It was a horrible experience when you just want to have some fun with your friends".

June 23 – The Sydney Morning Herald speaks to a 22-year-old woman who had allegedly been strip searched and ejected from a music festival at Sydney Olympic Park earlier that year. The woman said she was queueing up at the entrance of the event when she was approached by an officer with a drug detection dog. "It didn't sit down at any stage, but the officer stopped me and said the dog had indicated that I did have something on me". She said she was told to place her hands in front of her body before being taken to a police search area inside the event. "I remember the officer who interviewed me initially was rude. I was crying, and he said something along the lines that I was only crying because I knew I was guilty".

After initially being questioned, the woman said she was taken into an "enclosed cubicle" with a female police officer, who then instructed to remove her clothes. "First the officer told me to take off my top. Then my bra. She touched the seams of my clothing to make sure I hadn't hidden anything inside. She did the same with my hat. Then she gave me back those garments and told me to take off my pants and my underwear so she could inspect those items as well. The officer even took the inner soles from my shoes to see if anything was concealed in there" she recalled. "At the end she looked through my bag, even questioning why I had $60 in there. All up it took about 10 minutes, but it felt like an eternity. After I dressed we sat back at the table where she had taken my details, handing back my bag and my identification".

The woman claimed that despite no drugs being found, her ticket was confiscated by police, with officers allegedly citing a "previous offence" as the reason for denying her entry into the event. Speaking about the incident, the 22-year-old said it left her feeling "vulnerable and exposed". "You just feel so humiliated, and it's horrible because you haven't done anything wrong" she told the Herald. "Now when I go to an event I feel sick when I'm waiting to get in. I know I don't have anything on me, but it doesn't matter. I did nothing wrong that day and I was penalised for it".

July 11 – A witness breaks down in tears at a coronial inquest as she described how an officer had reportedly threatened to subject her to a "nice and slow" strip search at the Knockout Circuz music festival in 2017. The 28-year-old said she was entering the event at Sydney Olympic Park when a drug detection dog sat down beside her. It was alleged that she had then been taken into a booth, which she described as a "metal room", where a female officer instructed her to remove her clothes. "I had to take my top off and my bra, and I covered my boobs and she told me to put my hands up, and she told me to tell her where the drugs were" ... "She said, 'If you don't tell me where the drugs are, I'm going to make this nice and slow" the 28-year-old recalled. "She made me take my shorts off, and my underwear, and she made me squat and cough, and squat and cough, and squat and cough, and I had to turn around and squat and cough".

It was alleged that the officer had opened the door of the booth while the woman still naked to hand her wallet to someone outside. The woman had originally been called to give evidence in relation to the death of an 18-year-old festivalgoer who had died in hospital after consuming a fatal dose of MDMA at the same event earlier that day. In a final report from the inquest handed down in November, Deputy State Coroner Harriet Grahame made reference to the woman's testimony, describing it as "palpable and disturbing". In handing down her findings, Ms. Grahame had called for an end to the routine use of strip searches at music festivals in New South Wales, suggesting that they only be undertaken in cases where, "there is a reasonable suspicion that the person has committed or is about to commit an offence of supply a prohibited drug" and "there are reasonable grounds to believe that the strip search is necessary to prevent an immediate risk to personal safety or to prevent the immediate loss or destruction of evidence".

August 22 – The Hack program on Triple J reports on the increased use of strip searches by NSW Police. Texting into the program, one person wrote, "I was apparently detected by a sniffer dog at a festival in Sydney. I was then treated quite roughly and I was strip searched in full view of the entry line. I had no drugs in my possession, I was then released after having my details taken". Also texting into the program, another person wrote, "I got strip searched at Secret Garden festival too, had absolutely nothing on me whatsoever, the dog indicated while going through the car and I got taken away and strip searched. It was really intimidating and rude".

August 22 – Speaking to the ABC, a 21-year-old woman said she had been strip searched six times while attending separate music festivals in New South Wales. In one incident, the woman recalled being made to strip naked and "squat and cough' while she was on her period. "I was made to take my clothes off completely, squat and told I'd have to take my tampon out if they believed I had something concealed inside me" she said. "She was a woman herself so surely she could have understood how uncomfortable that would have made me feel". The 21-year-old said she was not carrying any illicit substances and the experience made her feel "humiliated and embarrassed".

August 23 – A caller to the Hack program on Triple J said he was strip searched at a music festival after an indication from a drug detection dog. "I went to a festival when I was about 17 years old and I got sat down by the dogs" ... "They took me out back and they said, 'You need to come for a strip search'. I told them that I was underage, and they were like 'yeah, well, still gotta do it otherwise we'll rip up your ticket'" he said. "I was kind of left in a position where I had no other option. I had to go in and get strip searched. They found nothing". The caller said the experience made him feel "super uneasy and just kind of violated in a way".

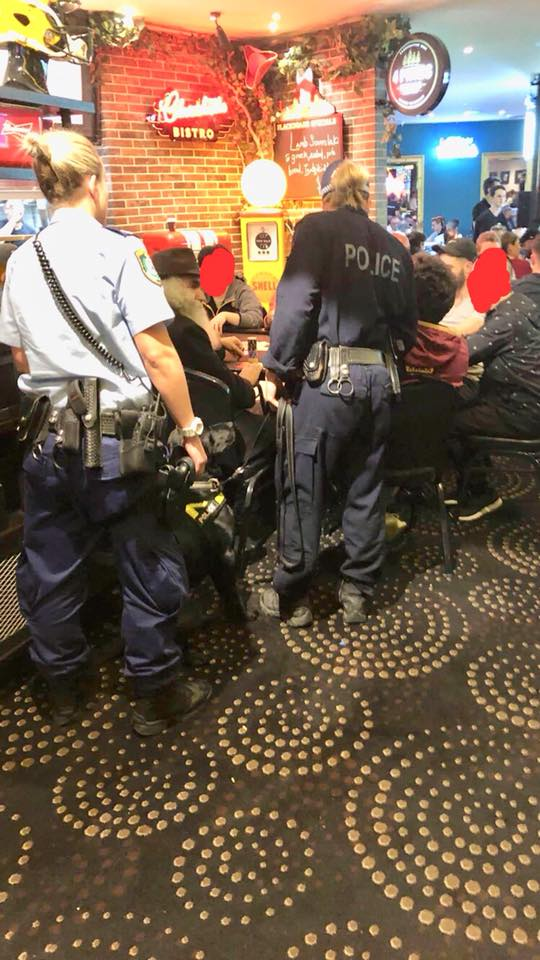
Police and a drug detection dog at a pub in Kingsford in 2019

September 5 – Speaking to news.com.au, a man said he was ejected from a music festival after being strip searched by police. "I was singled out as I was there by myself waiting for a mate who was coming from the other side of Sydney, so I was texting a lot and walking from stage to stage depending who was playing". The man said that he and his friend were later approached by officers on the dancefloor before being asked to follow them outside. It's alleged that the man was then taken to a separate area where police and security guards made him "drop his pants and underwear and pull up his shirt to be patted down". "It made me feel very uncomfortable and like a criminal for doing absolutely zero wrong," he recalled. "I asked the security why we were targeted. They said that they had seen me walking around texting constantly on my phone and then meeting my mate, they followed us in to where we were dancing". Speaking about the incident, the man said that "getting pulled out in front of others we knew as well and explaining it to them after was a sh*t feeling".

October 16 – A Byron Bay youth worker speaks to the ABC in support of leaked coronial inquest recommendations calling for a limitation on the use of strip searches at music festivals. "A 22-year-old woman underwent a horrendous strip search at Splendour this year, even after she had informed the police that she was the victim of a sexual assault that is currently before the courts," she said.

October 21 – Operate Brugge Hearing commences. The Law Enforcement Conduct Commission opens a four-day public hearing in relation to a complaint made by a 16-year-old girl who had allegedly been strip searched by police at the Splendour in the Grass music festival in 2018 (see Operation Brugge). The girl had reportedly been stopped by a drug detection dog at the entrance of the event. In a statement read by Counsel Assisting Dr. Peggy Dwyer on the first day of the inquiry, the Commission was told that the 16-year-old had been left feeling "completely humiliated" after being taken into a tent and made to strip naked in front of a female police officer. "I could not believe this was happening to me. I could not stop crying" she recalled.

The Commission was told that police had conducted 143 strip searches at the Splendour in the Grass music festival in 2018, with more than 90% of those searches resulting in no illicit substances being found. Seven of the festivalgoers strip searched at the event were recorded as being under the age of 18.

October 24 – The Project on Network 10 reports on the use of strip searches in New South Wales while discussing the evidence heard at the Law Enforcement Conduct Commission hearing that week. The report featured personal accounts from two women who had allegedly been strip searched by NSW Police. "They said if I don't persist and go with them that they'd take me and potentially arrest me. They searched my bra, they searched my pants, they found absolutely nothing. I felt humiliated after they did it, but first I was annoyed and intimidated" one of the women recalled. The other woman had also previously spoken to the ABC about her experience in a separate interview.

November 6 – Speaking to The Guardian, a 23-year-old woman recalled being made to strip to her underwear before a female officer had "jiggled" her bra at a police station in 2011. The woman said she was fifteen at the time of the alleged incident and described the experience as "intimidating" and "traumatic".

November 9 – A 19-year-old man says he was made to "lift his shirt, drop his pants and hold on to his genitals" while being strip searched inside a tent at the Lost Paradise music festival in December 2018. Speaking to the Guardian, the man said he was sitting in his car with a friend when a female police officer approached the vehicle with a drug detection dog. It's alleged that the officer had claimed that the man "looked nervous", before telling him that "if you have drugs on you then you might as well tell me now or I'll take you to the strip-search tent and we'll find them that way". The man said he was then strip searched by two male police officers. No drugs were reportedly found during the search and the 19-year-old said he felt "shook up" after the incident.

November 28 – Doctors at Sydney's St Vincent's Hospital deliver a signed letter to then NSW Premier Gladys Berejiklian calling on the state government to introduce pill testing and end the use of strip searches at music festivals in New South Wales. It followed an incident in the hospital's emergency department involving an 18-year-old woman who was allegedly brought in by police earlier in the year. The woman had reportedly sought police assistance at a music festival after admitting to internally concealing two MDMA tablets. It's alleged that the 18-year-old was then strip searched by officers before being subjected to three internal medical examinations. "Strip searches, as currently conducted, demean both the individual and the police conducting the search", wrote Dr Jennifer Stevens, the letter's author.

Speaking to Steve Price on 2GB that afternoon, Dr. Stevens also revealed that a colleague's daughter had been left feeling "absolutely devastated" after being strip searched by police at a separate event. "Where you go along to this music festival, something you love doing, somebody asks you to get naked and then, you know if you're not carrying anything that's fantastic, but then to expect somebody to put their clothes on, go into the festival and have a good time, without this having effected them profoundly I think is extraordinary" she said.

December 2 – Operation Gennaker Hearing commences. The Law Enforcement Conduct Commission opens a four-day public hearing centred around allegations of unlawful strip searches at an under 18s music festival earlier in the year (see Operation Gennaker). The Commission investigated complaints from three teenage boys who had attended the Lost City music festival at Sydney Olympic Park in February. All three had allegedly been strip searched by police at the event, with no illicit substances being recovered during any of those searches. In a final report handed down in May 2020, the LECC found that each of the three strip searches investigated during the hearing was "unlawful", however the Commission declined to make "serious misconduct" findings against any of the officers involved, citing a "lack of training and direction provided to those officers".

== 2020 ==
February 7 – The Hack Program on Triple J discusses revelations that NSW Police had set personal search quotas for officers to meet during the 2018 and 2019 financial years. The program featured an account from a girl who had attended the Splendour in the Grass music festival in 2018. She and a friend, both of whom were 15 at the time, had allegedly been strip searched by police at the event. "We'd just gotten off the public buses and we were pretty much, like filtering into the festival when we got approached by a policeman and the dog" she recalled. It's alleged that the dog had then reacted to the girl's friend. "The police officer pretty much straightaway was like, 'alright, come with us' and since I really didn't understand the system very well, I said to my friend, 'Oh, I'll take your bag for you, because I didn't realise they would need to go through it".

The girl said that the pair were then taken to different tents, which were "separated by a white sheet". "Pretty much he (Note: The girl uses the word "he" though it's not clearly stated if the strip search was conducted by a male police officer.) took me in there, asked me to take everything off except my underwear but including my bra. I pretty much just felt like I was doing what an adult told me to, and since I saw the officer as an authoritive figure and I was just the subordinate in that situation" she recalled. "I was a bit teary, and I felt very intimidated as sort of as though I didn't really have any say or idea of what was going on". Neither of the pair were reportedly carrying any illicit drugs at the time. Speaking about the incident, the girl said she would not have consented to the strip search had she been better informed about her legal rights. "We should have had our rights explained to us or we should have had what was happening explained to us further" she said.

May 8 – The Law Enforcement Conduct Commission releases the findings of five separate investigations relating to the use of strip searches by NSW Police. These include final reports from two public hearings held in 2019 centred around unlawful strip searches of minors at the Splendour in the Grass and Lost City music festivals, as well as an investigation into a 2015 incident in which a 53-year-old man had been awarded $112,000 in damages after being wrongfully strip searched at Kings Cross Police Station. Two additional reports released by the Commission related to separate incidents involving strip searches of indigenous persons in custody in 2017 and 2018. In one incident, a 16-year-old aboriginal boy had allegedly been subjected to two strip searches in regional New South Wales after being stopped by police with a small amount of cannabis in his possession. The Commission had also investigated a complaint from a 29-year-old Aboriginal man who had reportedly been strip searched in custody at a Sydney police station in 2017. In both cases, the Commission had found that the conduct of police was "unsatisfactory" but did not amount to serious misconduct (see Law Enforcement Conduct Commission Investigations).

May 27 – Speaking at the launch of a class action investigation, a 25-year-old British woman said she was left feeling "numb all over" after being strip searched at the Lost Paradise music festival on the Central Coast in 2017. The woman had reportedly been queueing with friends to enter the event when a drug detection dog had sat down beside her. It's alleged that officers had then told the 25-year-old they suspected she was in possession of illicit drugs before asking her to consent to a search. "I felt I had no choice but to comply, otherwise I'd be left stranded in the middle of nowhere, with no way of getting home" she told reporters.

It's alleged that the 25-year-old was then escorted to a search area inside the venue by a male police officer. Before handing her over to a female officer, it's alleged that he had said to the woman, "go easy on her, I don't think she's got anything on her". Recalling the comments, the 25-year-old said, "that's when I started feeling really scared". After handing over her ID and having her belongings searched, the woman said she was taken into a "large police transit van". It's alleged that the windshield of the van had been left uncovered and three male officers could be seen standing outside. "I was just so aware that people could look in. My main concern was the male police officers being so close at the time. There was no real privacy... It just felt very perverted, to be honest".

The 25-year-old said that the female officer had first asked her to lift up her top. When she informed the woman that she wasn't wearing a bra, it's alleged that she was told to "just do it quickly". She said that the officer had then asked if she was on her period. When she said yes, she recalled that the officer had told her that "we still need to do this anyway" before instructing her to remove her pants and underwear. The woman said she was then told to "drop, squat and cough", at which point the officer had allegedly squatted down and looked at her genital area. The woman was reportedly on her period and said she had a tampon inserted at the time. After the search had been completed, the 25-year-old said her belongings were returned and she allowed to leave the area, telling reporters that she began "sobbing uncontrollably" when she returned to her friends. Speaking about the incident, she said "I had done nothing wrong. I felt violated like I was just another body and not a human being".

July 21 –The Law Enforcement Conduct Commission releases the findings of an internal police investigation carried out by Strike Force Blackford, a task force made up of officers from the Force's Professional Standards Command (see Strike Force Blackford Report). The investigation was overseen by the Commission and had been centred around five separate complaints made in relation to unlawful strip searches, four of which had allegedly taken place at music festivals. In each incident, the complainants had been stopped by police after a drug detection dog indication. None of the individuals searched had been found in possession of illicit drugs.

December 15 –The Law Enforcement Conduct Commission hands down a final report detailing the findings of its two-year inquiry into strip search practices employed by NSW Police. The report made reference to several previous investigations undertaken by the LECC, including several investigations which had not previously been disclosed to the public. In one incident, an Aboriginal man had allegedly been strip searched by police in regional New South Wales after officers had suspected he was in possession of a weapon. In another case, two young people had allegedly been strip searched at a shopping centre on the state's Mid North Coast after staff at a jewellery store had accused them of shoplifting. A summary of that incident included in the report stated that:

On the advice of an Inspector, who was not in attendance but who had been contacted to provide advice about whether the young people should be searched, police decided to strip search both of the young persons at the shopping centre. A female officer attended to assist. Both young people were taken to the store lunch room where their pockets were emptied and bags searched. The male young person was asked by Police whether he would submit to a search on the basis that there were reasonable grounds to suspect that they had the ring. He was strip searched behind a cupboard, in the break out room of the store. The ring was not located. The female young person was strip searched in the disabled toilets of the shopping centre, by the female officer. Male police officers were standing outside the first cubicle while the female young person was strip searched inside the second cubicle by the female officer. The door of the cubicle was held ajar by a plastic tub during the search. The ring was not located on her.

== 2021 ==
November 16 – Compensation firm Slater and Gordon releases an update on a proposed class action set to be launched in collaboration with Redfern Legal Centre in relation to unlawful strip searches conducted by NSW Police. It's announced that the proposed class action will focus exclusively on incidents which had taken place at the Splendour in the Grass music festival between 2016 and 2019 (a separate statement suggested that these incidents would only be used as a "test case").

An article published on the Triple J Hack website featured an account from a 25-year-old man who had allegedly been strip searched at the event in 2016 after being stopped by a drug detection dog. "I didn't actually see the dog sit down... and all of a sudden, I just got this forceful grab on the shoulder by an officer," he recalled. "It was kind of just a big shock, I had nothing on me or anything to hide". Despite informing police that he didn't have any drugs on his person, it's alleged that the officer had then proceeded to search the man's pockets and shoes before taking him to a "demountable building" where a strip search was conducted. "I didn't actually have to take my shirt off at all, it was just straight 'Take your pants off, turn around, bend over, and open up" he said. No drugs were reportedly found and the 25-year-old was later allowed to enter the festival, suggesting that an insulin pen he was carrying at the time may have caused the dog to react. "It felt like an invasion of my privacy, like my dignity was just gone for that moment in time and I actually felt quite vulnerable," he told Triple J's Avani Dias. "At no point in time was I given any rights or asked if I had consent to what they were doing".

A statement released by Redfern Legal Centre featured a separate account from a 23-year-old woman who had allegedly been strip searched twice at the same festival in 2017 within a period of several hours. In both instances, the woman had allegedly been stopped by a drug detection dog. Speaking about what happened, she said:

It was around 2pm on Friday, July 21 and I was entering the festival from the campground. Two police officers, who had a drug detection dog, took me into a tent where they were searching people. When I protested, they told me that if I didn't co-operate with the search in the tent, then they would take me to a police station to be searched. I didn't want to be taken to a police station, isolated from my partner and friends, I was already very frightened. I asked for my partner to stay with me and support me during the search, but it was refused. My partner was then repeatedly ordered by police to move on. I was searched by a female senior constable. The way she spoke to me was condescending and patronising, for example, she repeatedly told me: 'The process will be made easier if you tell me where you are hiding the drugs.' Each item of my clothing was intentionally thrown on the wet and muddy ground by the officer, and I was forced to strip down."

"I told her four times that I had no drugs on me, that I had not taken any drugs, that there was no way any of my clothes could have come into contact with any drugs. I explained that I was diabetic and was carrying insulin with me, and if the drug detection dog had detected something, maybe it was the insulin. But she told me 'drug detection dogs are highly trained. We are positive you have drugs on your person'. At one point during the search, a male police officer opened the tent and stared at my naked body. In response, I turned away to hide my body and alerted the female officer that he was watching. She claimed no one was watching and continued searching me, when I could clearly see that the male officer was still looking through the tent. The whole experience was extremely traumatising, especially due to the way the police presumed I was guilty and the way I was both spoken to and physically handled. I felt violated because the male officer starred at me while I was naked. I was so traumatised that I returned to my campsite and changed every item of my clothing, which was also necessary because my clothes were wet and muddy after being thrown on the ground by the police officer, except I kept my socks and the handbag that contained my insulin."

"Around 5pm the same day, while I was attempting to re-enter the music festival again, my jacket was grabbed from behind by a male police officer who I saw signalling the drug detection dog to come and sit at my feet. I believe the male police officer told the dog to sit because I looked nervous due to my previous experience earlier that day. I told him I had already been searched that day and I asked him what the limit was on the number of times an individual could be searched within 24 hours, he told me: 'unlimited'. I said if you're going to search me again, can I at least have the same officer perform the search. Without any effort to honour my request, the officer told me no, she's busy. Then I was taken to the same tent, told to strip naked and was searched for the second time in the same day. Again, I had no drugs on me, I had not taken any drugs, I had not touched any drugs and there was no way my clothing could have made contact with drugs.

The 23-year-old had described her treatment at the hands of police as "disgusting", adding that "I want to be involved in this case to speak up for myself and for others because this should not be allowed to happen. I shouldn't have been treated like this, no one should be treated like this". The woman had also spoken about her experience on the Triple J Hack program on November 16.

November 16 – Calling into the Hack radio program on Triple J that afternoon, one woman recalled an incident she had witnessed at the Splendour in the grass music festival. "My compound at one point was right beside a gate into the festival from the campground, and they actually used my toilet to strip search a girl and had the door halfway open, girl cop, boy cop there, young girl probably 18 years old, made her take her tampon out, door halfway open, one of my staff members went past, saw the whole thing happen, came to me in tears and said, 'you gotta do something about it' and so I went over and dealt with the police and basically told them to 'off it' out of my compound you know. It was quite horrific and then they just left the girl there, didn't find anything, left the girl there in tears, so I just put her in my buggy and go and try and find her friends and try and make her feel better" she said. "Working back of scenes, working in operations in events for the last 25 years, I've seen a lot of what goes on back of house and yeah, a lot of strip searches, a lot of crying, a lot of people in tears and feeling vulnerable and feeling like they'd been violated, and the area that I worked in we were all over the place, in the campgrounds, in front and back of house, so I saw firsthand a lot of people in tears and stuff and had to literally pick up the pieces of these kids and try and make them feel a bit better and try and make their festival experience a happy one".

The program had also heard from a caller who had allegedly been strip searched at the FOMO music festival. "I was strip searched at 17, they knew that I was underage as well. I had told them my age, showed them my ID and yeah, I was asked to squat and cough and take off all my clothes. My parents actually weren't aware of it until after I had been strip searched, so I was just humiliated and disgusting [sic] and they never found anything on me and I just can't believe, I didn't even know that it was illegal until all of this started coming out and I still don't really know how to go about it, because it's been so many years since that event". Texting into the program, another person had written, "If I had known I would have done something about it but having a policewoman in front of you asking you to take all your clothes off ... I just did it because I didn't know any better".

== 2022 ==
July 22 – Class action documents are filed in the Supreme Court of New South Wales in relation to strip searches carried out by NSW Police. Contrary to previous announcements, it's reported that the class action will include any person who had been strip searched on suspicion of drug possession at any music festival in New South Wales from 22 July 2016 onward. It's announced that head plaintiff for the class action will be a female patron who had allegedly been strip searched at the Splendour in the Grass music festival in 2018. In a statement of claim document, the woman, who was 27 at the time, said she had been stopped by a drug detection dog on her way into the event. It's alleged that she was then escorted to a search area where police had set-up "a number of open makeshift cubicles" covered by a screen made from "tarpaulin-like material". The woman claimed she had been taken into a cubicle where a female officer had ordered her to "lift her breasts and bend over, and to show the officer her genitals to prove that the only item inserted in her body was a tampon". It was also alleged that at one point a male police officer had entered the cubicle while the woman was naked from the waist down. Speaking about the incident, she described the experience as "degrading, scary and confusing", adding in a statement that "since then, every time I approach security to enter a festival or gig, I get scared and wonder if it's going to happen to me all over again".
