= Law Enforcement (Powers and Responsibilities) Act 2002 =

2002 Act of the Parliament of New South Wales

Parliament of New South Wales
- Long title: An Act to consolidate and restate the law relating to police and other law enforcement officers' powers and responsibilities; to set out the safeguards applicable in respect of persons being investigated for offences; to repeal certain Acts and to consequentially amend other Acts; and for other purposes.
- Citation: Act No. 103, 2002; No. 103, 2002 as amended
- Assented to: 29 November 2002
- Commenced: 1 December 2005
- Status: Current legislation

The Law Enforcement (Powers and Responsibilities) Act 2002 (NSW) is an Act of the Parliament of New South Wales which governs the exercise of specific police powers in New South Wales.

The Act contains nineteen parts which either reinforce the common law, relocate existing sections from other Acts or establish new powers and safeguards. Since its implementation, the Act has been subject to many amendments, but the majority of critical legal discussion has concerned those that occurred in 2009, 2013 and 2014. In the media, there has been controversy surrounding the Act's provisions relating to the power of police to conduct searches, as well as what constitutes reasonable use of force.

== Origins ==
The Act was a response to the Wood Royal Commission, which investigated police corruption in the New South Wales Police Force, and their 1997 associated report that advocated for the consolidation of police powers into a procedural code. The commission argued that this would have the benefit of protecting individual rights, reducing police corruption and aiding police training.

The Government of New South Wales adopted this recommendation and began draughting the Act in 1998. The structure of the Police and Criminal Evidence Act 1984, which defines police powers in the United Kingdom, served as a guide for the layout of the Act.

== The Act ==
The main function of the Act is to codify and govern the exercise of specific police powers. If police do not comply with provisions within the Act, this may, but does not always, lead to evidence being unable to be used in court under section 138 of the Evidence Act 1995.

=== Consolidation of common law ===
Within the Act, there are many provisions that essentially reflect the exercise of police powers within existing common law. This is evident in section 231 of the Act which dictates that only "reasonably necessary" force must be used to make an arrest. Parts of the Act also extend the common law. This includes section 10 which regulates the ability of police to enter into premises to arrest individuals, a power previously found in the case Lippl v Haines (1989) 18 NSWLR 620.

=== Re-allocation of existing provisions from other Acts ===
The Act also contains sections that relocate guidelines concerning police powers from other Acts. For example, Part 16 of the Act, which relates to the power of police to detain an intoxicated individual, very closely mirrors the Intoxicated Persons Act 1979. As well, Part 9 of the Act ("Investigations and questioning") contains provisions that essentially copy what used to be Part 10A of the Crimes Act 1900. Sections 114 and 115 in Part 9 of the Act outline the circumstances in which police may detain someone for investigative purposes as well as the appropriate length of time for an investigation period.

=== New powers and safeguards created ===
==== Searches ====
Part 4 of the Act describes the power of police to undertake different categories of searches without a warrant. Specifically, division 4 contains provisions which permits personal searches. This includes searches generally and strip searches. Sections 33 and 34 contain rules in relation to ensuring the privacy and appropriateness of strip searches, including a provision that specifies that children under 10 must not be strip searched.

==== Arrest ====
Section 99 of the Act expands the scope of the previous common law power of police to arrest. This is primarily due to the broadness of the list of "reasons" which constitute the need for arrest (section 99, sub-section (1)(b)), as well as the lack of a provision which governs circumstances in which an officer "must not arrest" an individual.

==== Crime Scenes ====
Part 7 of the Act codifies crime scene powers not previously enshrined in legislature. It outlines the circumstances where police are able to set up a crime scene as well as the power to prevent individuals from entering, tampering with or recording crime scenes.

==== Safeguards ====
Part 15 of the Act contains restrictions on the exercise of police powers. Section 202 outlines how police must give their details as well as any warnings to an individual "as soon as it is reasonably practicable to do so" when exercising a power, or beforehand when specifically giving directions or requesting an individual carry out a particular task. Section 203, sub-section (1) specifies that police must also warn an individual when the law specifies that they must "comply with a direction, requirement or request".

=== Review of the Act ===
Section 242 of the Act requires the Inspector of the Law Enforcement Conduct Commission to review and scrutinise police powers, such as in relation to search warrants, as a method of external monitoring of the Act. As part of this, the Inspector must also produce a report containing any observations made or research conducted (section 242(6) of the Act). Currently, the Inspector is Terry Buddin, a previous Supreme Court Judge in NSW.

As well, section 242A of the Act requires the Commissioner of Police, the Commissioner for the New South Wales Crime Commission and the Law Enforcement Conduct Commission to "each report annually on the exercise of powers under Part 5." Lastly, the Chief Commissioner of the Law Enforcement Conduct Commission "may at any time make a special report on any matter arising out of the operation of Division 4 of Part 3 to the Minister" (Section 242B(5)). Justice Michael Adams is the current Chief Commissioner of the Law Enforcement Conduct Commission.

== Amendments ==
=== Search powers amendment ===
The Law Enforcement (Powers and Responsibilities) Amendment (Search Powers) Act 2009 commenced on 29 May 2009. It introduced a new section (75A) relating to police search powers, which allows "a person executing or assisting in the execution of a warrant" to bring equipment to the premises and operate it in order to inspect specific objects. The provision also allows police to take anything away from the premises for the purposes of further examination. Section 75B is similar but it instead permits "a person executing or assisting in the execution of a warrant" to use equipment in order to look at data, copy data or take the device where the data is stored for further examination.

=== Arrest without warrant amendment ===
The Law Enforcement (Powers and Responsibilities) Amendment (Arrest without Warrant) Act 2013 was a response to Part 1 of a review of the Act carried out by Andrew Tink, who used to be the Shadow Attorney-General and Paul Whelan, a previous Police Minister, which focused specifically on the power of arrest under section 99. Accordingly, the 2013 Amendment Act replaced section 99 with a new provision which effectively expanded police powers of arrest and demonstrated a shift towards arrest as a first rather than last resort.

=== Law Enforcement Amendment Act 2014 ===
Part 2 of Andrew Tink and Paul Whelan’s report was published on 12 December 2013, and concentrated on Parts 9 and 15 of the Act. This review subsequently led to the implementation of the Law Enforcement (Powers and Responsibilities) Amendment Act 2014 which commenced on 2 November 2014. According to an article by Jane Sanders called "Police powers update March 2015: recent legislative amendments", one of the most controversial amendments was pursuant to section 115 in which the investigation period (which starts when an is arrested) was extended from 4 to 6 hours. The Act also amended police search powers, such as the removal of the separate categorisation of frisk and ordinary searches to "searches generally" under section 30. Part 15, relating to safeguards, was also amended. This involved the removal of the consequences of a police officer failing to provide their details to an individual under section 201. Previously, this would mean the exercise of the particular power would become invalid, but now it results only in a complaint. Other amendments were also made to police powers of entry (sections 82-84) and crime scene powers (sections 91-95).

== Significant cases ==
=== R v McClean ===
R v McClean [2008] NSWLC 11 was a case that considered section 99 of the original Act before the 2013 Amendment Act. It affirmed the idea of arrest as a last resort. The case involved a woman (McClean) who police suspected to be involved in a break and enter. She was initially questioned, then arrested and then a physical struggle took place between her and police. In court, Magistrate Heilpern explained how arrest is unlawful if it does not align with one of the purposes in section 99, sub-section 3 and determined that in this particular case, arrest was for further investigation which did not fall under one of those purposes. As well, Magistrate Heilpern emphasised that the arrest remained unlawful despite the purpose of arrest subsequently changing to something else.

=== Poidevin v Semaan ===
Poidevin v Semaan [2013] NSWCA 334 was a case that occurred before the introduction of the Law Enforcement (Powers and Responsibilities) Amendment Act 2014, where safeguards concerning police powers were all located in section 201 of the Act. The case was heard by the NSW Court of Appeal. The case involved an interaction between Mr Semaan and a police officer (Mr Poidevin) where Mr Poidevin tried to take Mr Semaan’s phone and restrain him. On appeal, the issue for the judges to consider related to section 201 of the Act. Leeming JA outlined how a failure by police to give warnings and details when it is "reasonably practicable" after exercising their powers does not then "retrospectively affect the lawfulness" of their actions.

=== DPP (NSW) v Mathews-Hunter ===
DPP (NSW) v Mathews-Hunter [2014] NSWSC 843 was a case that took place after the 2013 amendment to section 99 of the Act. It involved a transit officer who saw the defendant (Mathews-Hunter) drawing on a window of a train. The transit officer subsequently arrested the defendant, due to the fact he was graffitiing the train, by "physically restraining him" when a fine would have been sufficient. Since the defendant was arrested by a citizen rather than a police officer, the judge, Fullerton J, was forced to consider whether the notion of arrest as a last resort applied to section 100. She held that it did apply to the "Power of other persons" to arrest, such as in the situation of a transit officer.

=== Hamilton v State of New South Wales ===
Hamilton v State of New South Wales (No 13) [2016] NSWSC 1311 concerned a situation where the plaintiff (Hamilton) was arrested by police due to his alleged assault of a taxi driver. The judge, Campbell J, held that the arrest complied with section 99 of the Act, but did not satisfy section 231 which relates to use of force. He found that police used excessive force which was not proportionate to the plaintiff's alleged crime. As well, Campbell J found that police also did not comply with the requirement under Part 15 that they provide their details and any warnings as soon as reasonably practicable.

== Controversy and reform proposals ==
=== Police powers to conduct strip searches ===
A recent SMH newspaper article titled "Rise in strip searches in NSW damaging the credibility of police" that was published in February 2019 described the sudden increase in the number of strip searches in NSW that occurred in 2017-18 (5483) compared to in 2014-15 (3735). The article argued that this increase was alarming based on the notion of strip searches as a last resort. As a result of this increase, in October 2018, the Law Enforcement Conduct Commission stated that it would investigate the exercise of police powers under the Act to undertake strip searches.

In May 2019, 10 daily published an article "Highest in the World: Half of Aussie Drug Users Report Encounters with Police", which examined the link between the use of sniffer dogs and subsequent strip searches of individuals by police for possession of any drugs. The power of police to use dogs in relation to drug detection comes under Part 11, Division 2 of the Act. The article outlined public criticism of the use of drug detection dogs. It referenced a study conducted in 2011 which suggested that "false positives" resulting from searches conducted by sniffer dogs occurred around 80% of the time, leading to unnecessary strip searches.

=== Use of necessary force by police ===
There has also been recent discussion in the media concerning the use of force exercised by police when making arrests, which falls under section 231 of the Act. A May 2018 article from news.com.au called "What powers do police have when it comes to using force?" reported a statistic compiled by the Law Enforcement Conduct Commission, which documented "93 investigations into NSW Police use of force, 18 of which include allegations of assault and unreasonable force".

More specifically, there has also been controversy surrounding the use of Tasers by police. In 2012, Roberto Laudisio-Curti died after being tasered by police, which led to the NSW ombudsman preparing a report that same year on police using Tasers. Further, in February 2018, a man who had a mental illness also died from the use of a Taser during an arrest. This prompted the New South Wales Council for Civil Liabilities to demand further investigation and research of statistics relating to Taser use, in order to review and improve Taser procedures. This relates directly to the use of necessary force when making arrests under section 231 of the Act.

== See also ==
- New South Wales Police Force
- New South Wales Police Force strip search scandal

== Bibliography ==
- Sanders, J (2005). "New Police Powers: The Law Enforcement (Powers and Responsibilities) Act" (PDF). CLS Conference. Sydney: Legal Aid New South Wales.: 1–44. Archived from the original (PDF) on 9 April 2019.
