= New South Wales Police Force strip search scandal =

Policing scandal

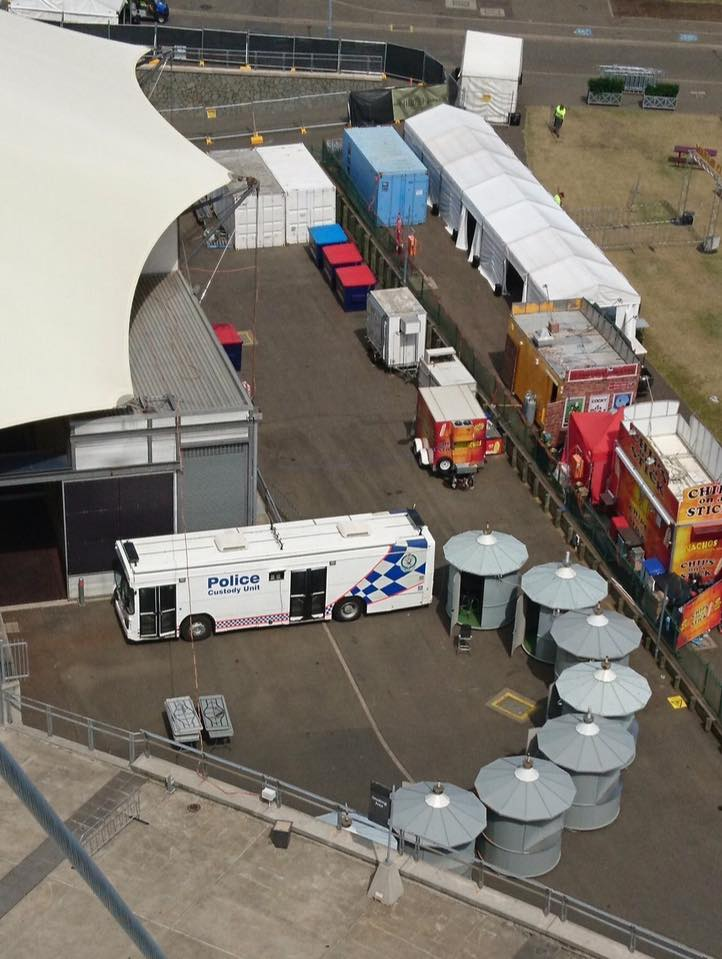
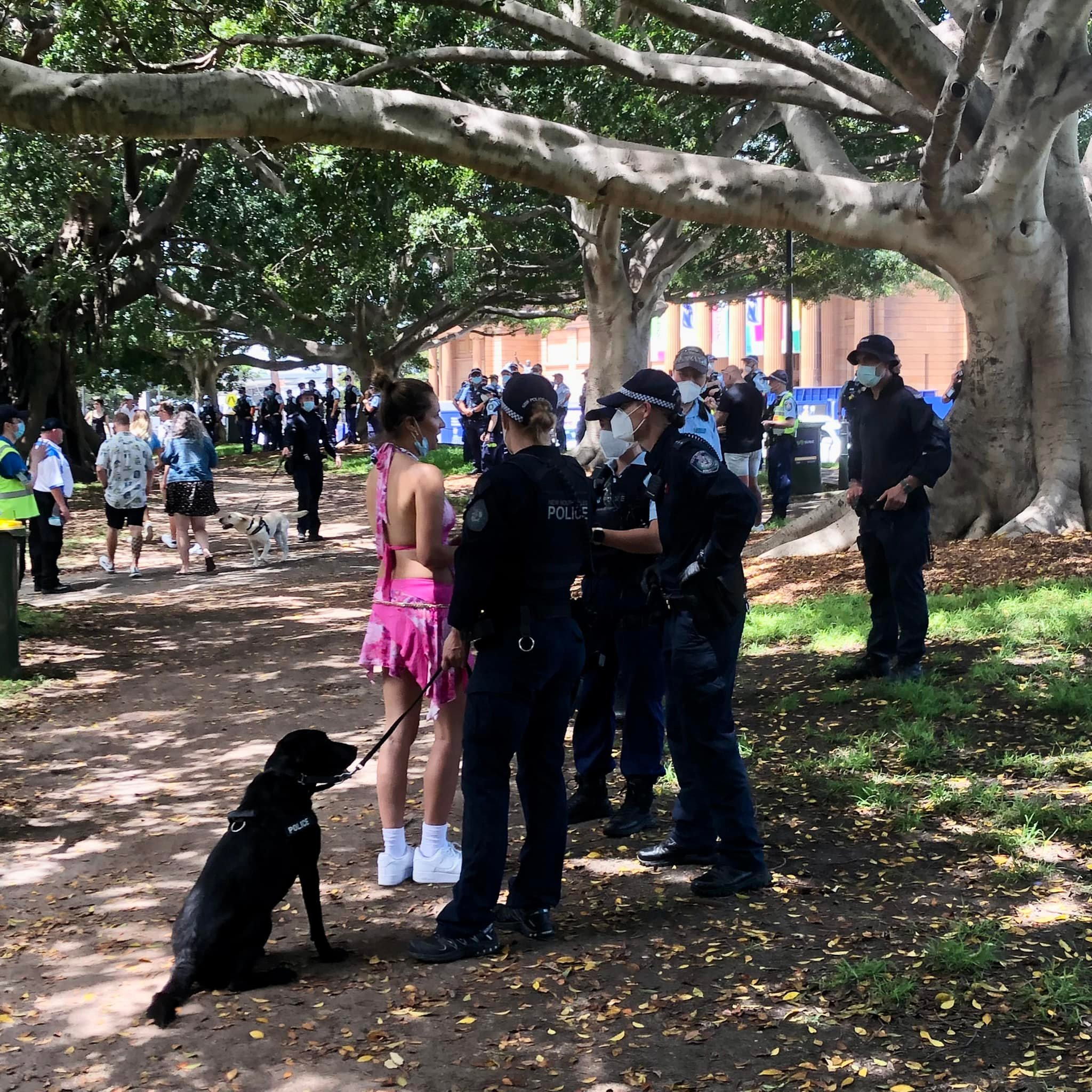
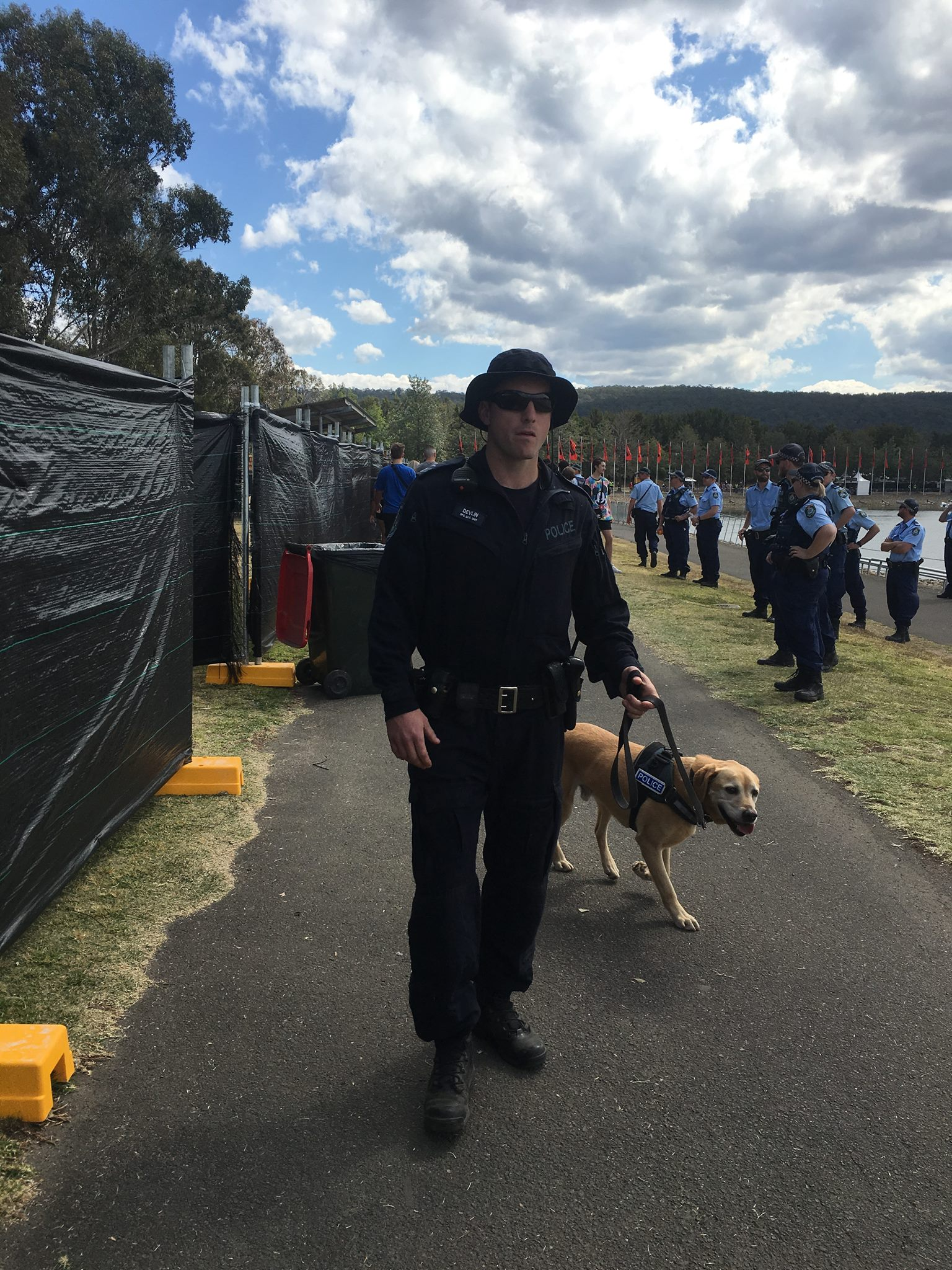
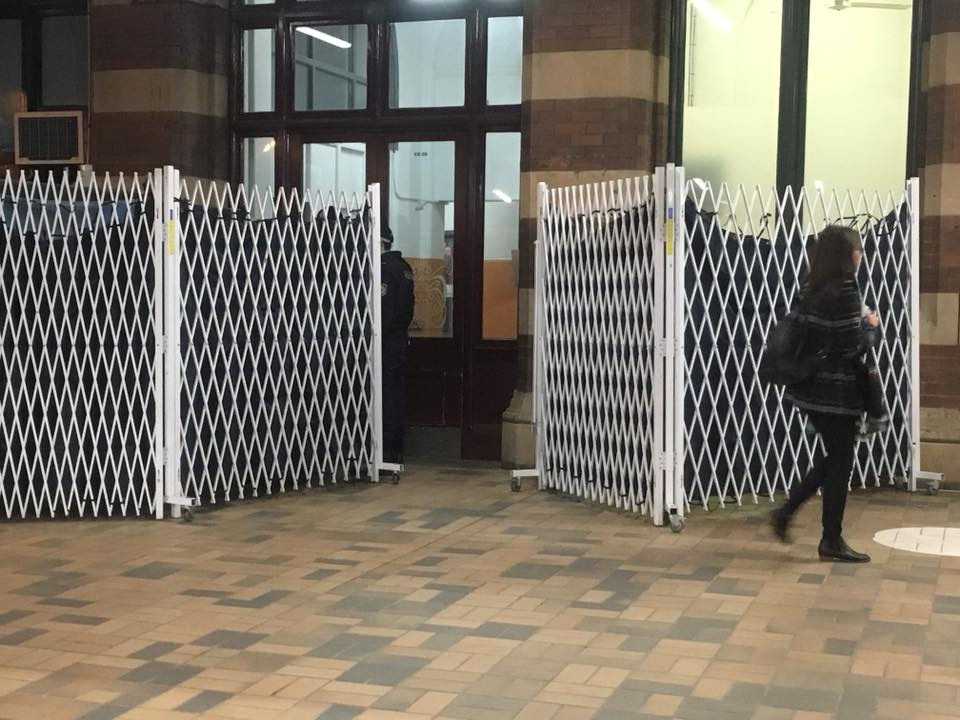
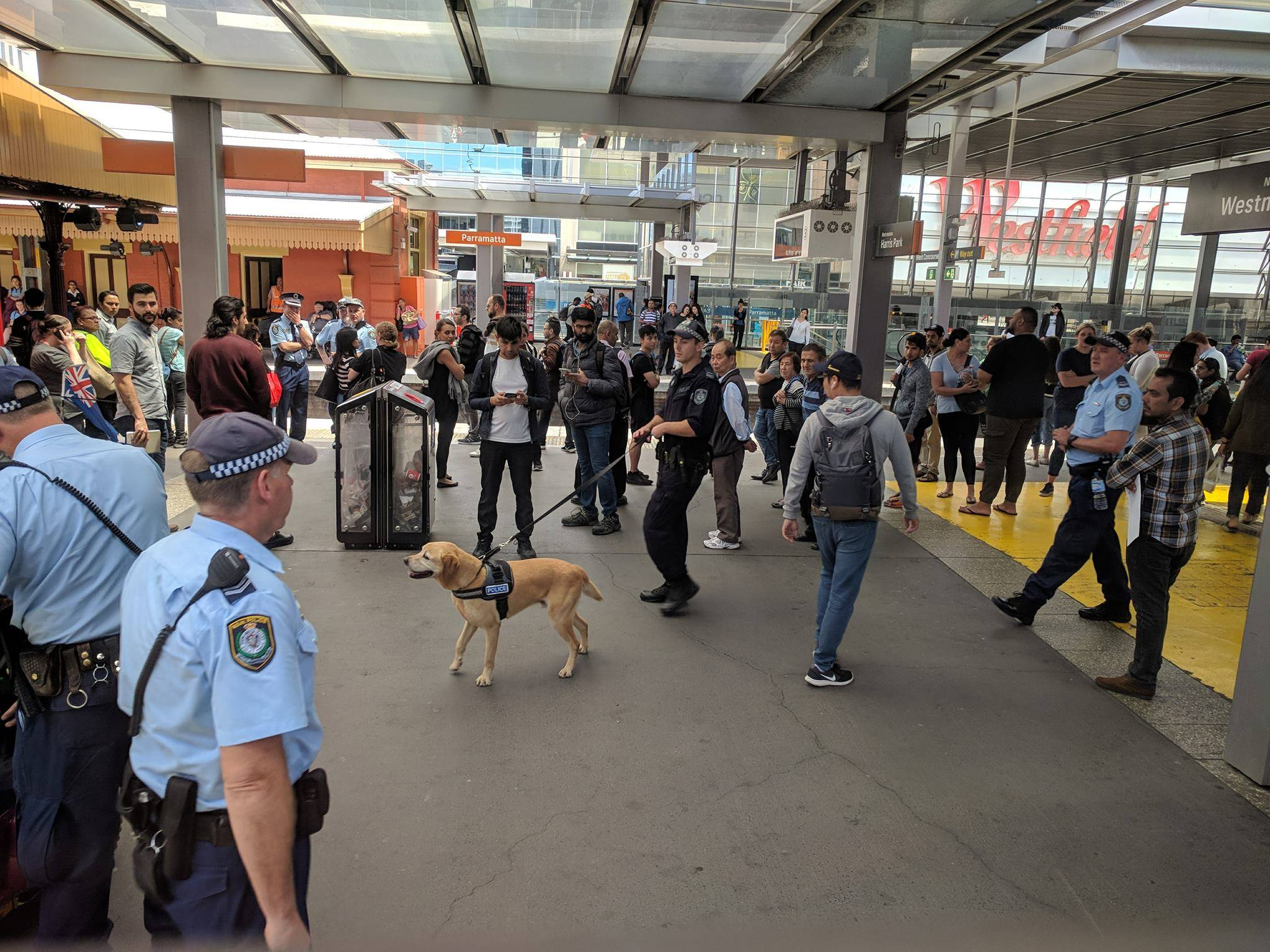
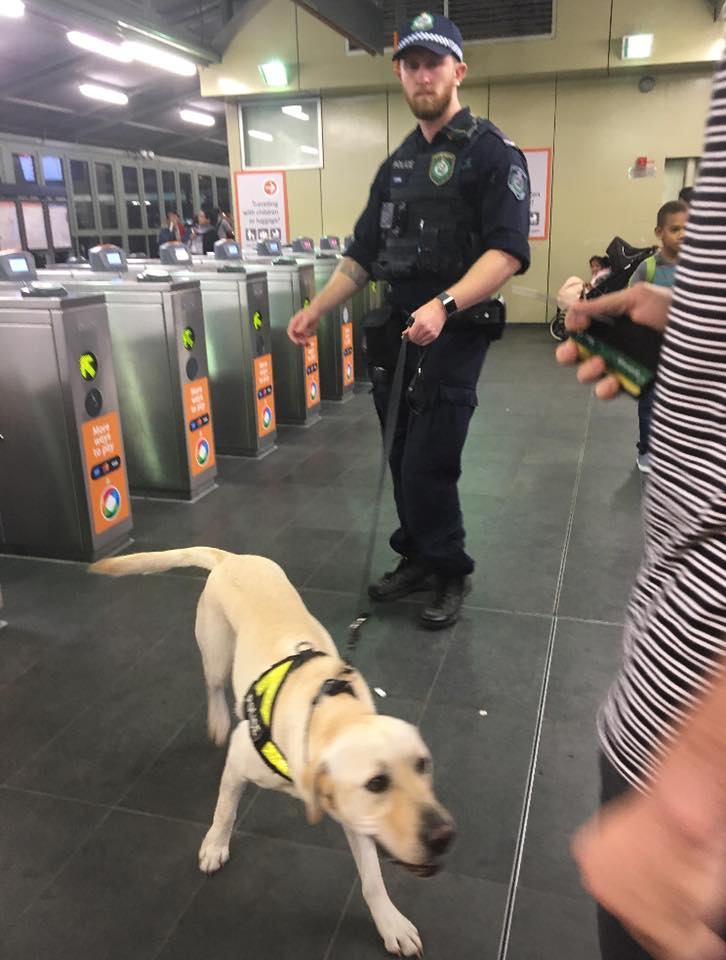
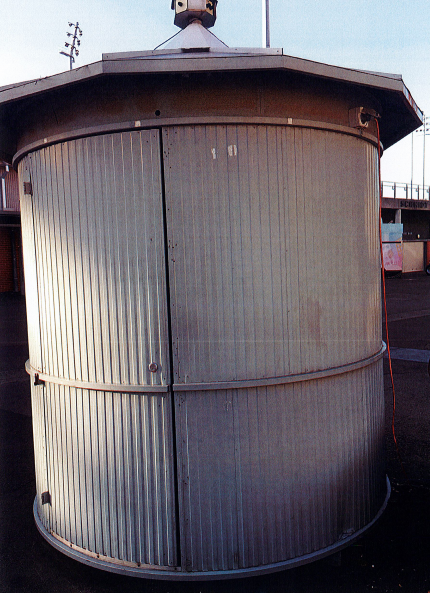
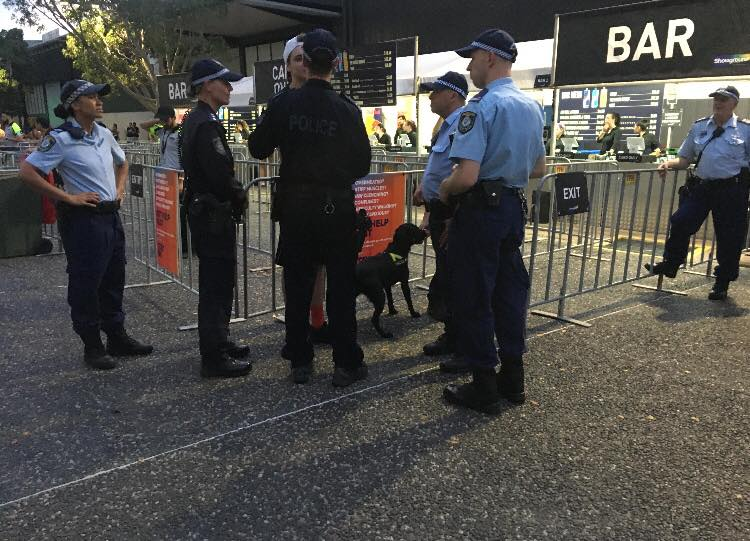
- From top left: Ticket Booths inside the police compound at the 2019 Hidden music festival at Sydney Olympic Park; An attendee being stopped by Police at the 2022 Field Day music festival in The Domain; Police and a drug detection dog at the entrance of the 2017 Defqon music festival; Search partitions at Sydney's Central Station during a drug detection dog operation in 2019; A drug detection dog at Parramatta Train Station in 2017; A drug detection dog at Hornsby Train Station in 2019; One of several ticket booths used by police to search patrons during events held at Sydney Olympic Park; An attendee being stopped by police at the Summer Gathering music festival in 2020
- Date: 2001–present
- Venue: Multiple locations, including music festivals, train stations, licensed venues and police stations
- Location: New South Wales, Australia
- Type: Police misconduct – Improper use of strip searches
- Inquiries: Law Enforcement Conduct Commission Inquiry (2018–2020)
- Litigation: Slater and Gordon – Redfern Legal Centre class action

The New South Wales Police Force strip search scandal is an ongoing policing scandal involving the use of strip searches by members of the New South Wales Police Force.

Following the introduction of a controversial law in 2001, police in New South Wales were given the power to deploy drug detection dogs at major events such as music festivals, inside licensed venues (venues that serve alcohol, such as pubs and clubs) and at stations across the Sydney Trains network. In 2006, a report by the New South Wales Ombudsman advised the government to consider repealing this law, with figures published in the report revealing that 74% of people searched after an indication from a dog were not carrying any illicit drugs.

In 2014, it was first reported that people stopped by drug detection dogs were routinely being subjected to invasive strip searches by NSW Police, with large numbers of these searches being conducted at music festivals. During these searches, officers have forced people to strip partially or completely naked and do things such as lift their breasts or genitals, bend over, spread their buttocks apart, and squat and cough. In some cases, women have also been asked to remove tampons.

At music festivals and other major events, NSW Police have used structures such as ticket booths, tents, makeshift partitions and police vans to strip search attendees. In some cases, these structures have been left open or did not block the view of people outside, leaving attendees exposed to other festivalgoers and police while they were being strip searched. In other cases, male officers have walked in on female festivalgoers while strip searches were taking place. Strip searches have also been conducted by NSW Police during drug detection dog operations at train stations and licensed venues.

Data from NSW Police shows that in the six-year period between July 2014 and June 2020, officers conducted 27,835 strip searches "in the field" (outside of a police station). Of that number, 5,659 were attributed to drug detection dog indications, with the same figures revealing that an additional 63,302 frisk or "general searches" (Note: The term "personal search" encompasses both strip searches and general searches (originally referred to as "frisk" or "ordinary" searches before changes made in 2014). According to the law, when conducting a general search, an officer may "quickly run his or her hands over the person's outer clothing", "require the person to remove his or her coat or jacket or similar article of clothing and any gloves, shoes, socks and hat" or "examine anything in the possession of the person".) resulting from drug detection dog indications were also carried out during this period. Data from specific events is limited, however at the Splendour in the Grass music festival in 2018, it was revealed that officers strip searched 143 attendees, with over 90% of those searches failing to find any illicit drugs.

In October 2018, the Law Enforcement Conduct Commission (LECC) launched a formal investigation into the use of strip searches by NSW Police. In several cases it investigated, the commission found that officers acted unlawfully. The commission also noted that there had been a "significant increase" in the number of strip searches carried out following drug detection dog indications between 2014 and 2019. In July 2022, a class action was filed in the Supreme Court of New South Wales on behalf of patrons strip searched at music festivals by NSW Police from July 2016 onwards. A trial for the class action began in May 2025, with over 3000 group members enrolled.

== Background ==
Drug policy in New South Wales was a contentious political issue throughout the 1990s. In 1997, the Wood Royal Commission into Police Corruption concluded that there was "systematic and entrenched" corruption within the New South Wales Police Service (later changed to New South Wales Police Force). The commission uncovered cases where officers had engaged in bribery, assault, evidence tampering, drug supply and other misconduct. The commission noted that a significant amount of the corruption uncovered throughout the inquiry was "connected to drug law enforcement". Adverse findings were made against 284 officers, seven of whom were later jailed.

As part of the security operation in place for the Sydney 2000 Olympic Games, NSW Police received an additional 30 sniffer dogs, with many being repurposed as drug detection dogs after the games concluded. The dogs were initially deployed as part of a wider strategy to address drug crime in the South Western Sydney suburb of Cabramatta, however by early 2001, the dogs were routinely being deployed at various locations across New South Wales, including clubs, licensed venues and public transport precincts. During one operation in October, over 1000 nightclub patrons were searched in coordinated raids involving an estimated 300 officers and nine drug detection dogs.

These operations drew criticism from a number of organisations and civil liberties groups, including the NSW Council for Civil Liberties, the AIDS Council of New South Wales and Redfern Legal Centre. In opposing their use, Redfern Legal Centre assisted in the preparation of several test cases aimed at challenging the legality of drug detection dog operations in the state's courts. In one such case (Police v Darby), a man had been charged with possessing cannabis and methamphetamine after being stopped by a drug detection dog. At a hearing in November, a Local Court Magistrate dismissed the charges, ruling that the act of the dog "nuzzling" and "sniffing" the man constituted an unlawful search.

Responding to the Court's decision in Darby, then Opposition Leader Kerry Chikarovski introduced a bill aimed at clarifying the powers available to police in relation to drug detection dogs. The proposed legislation was not supported by the government. The following month in December, newly appointed Police Minister Michael Costa introduced his own bill, similar to the one which had been put forward by the Opposition. Despite opposition from some crossbench MPs, the bill passed with bipartisan support. The new legislation, the Police Powers (Drug Detection Dogs) Act 2001, gave NSW Police the power to deploy drug detection dogs at major public events, licensed venues and on selected routes across Sydney's public transport network These powers were expanded to include the entire Sydney Trains network in 2012.

== 2006 Ombudsman's Report (drug detection dogs) ==
Conditional to the passage of the Police Powers (Drug Detection Dogs) Act 2001, New South Wales Ombudsman Bruce Barbour was given the task of overseeing initial drug detection dog operations carried out under the legislation, with a report to be tabled to Parliament after a two-year review period. In a final report published in June 2006, the Ombudsman criticised the use of drug detection dogs by NSW Police, describing them as an "ineffective tool" for catching drug dealers and questioning whether the legislation authorising their use should be "retained at all".

Overwhelmingly, the use of drug detection dogs has led to public searches of individuals in which no drugs were found, or to the detection of (mostly young) adults in possession of very small amounts of cannabis for personal use.

— Former New South Wales Ombudsman Bruce Barbour

An excerpt from a video of a drug detection dog operation at Newtown Train Station in 2017

A key issue identified in the report was that most people stopped after a drug detection dog indication were not found in possession of any illicit drugs. Between February 2002 and February 2004, NSW Police conducted 10,211 personal searches resulting from drug detection dog indications. Of that number, 74% resulted in no drugs being found. In the 26% of cases where drugs were recovered, 84% resulted in small amounts of cannabis being seized. Based on these findings, the Ombudsman recommended that NSW Police guidelines be amended to state that officers did not have a "reasonable suspicion to search a person based solely on a drug detection dog indication".

Responding to a draft release of the Ombudsman's report in 2004, Police Minister John Watkins rejected calls to end drug detection dog operations in NSW. "That may be the Ombudsman's view but it's not the view of the NSW Police or the state government," he said. "The advice to me from police is that they are effective ... and the community wishes to see them." In 2005, the Police Powers (Drug Detection Dogs) Act 2001 was repealed, with the powers under the law instead being incorporated into wider police powers legislation. Following the release of the Ombudsman's final report in 2006, the state government reaffirmed its support for the use of drug detection dogs in public spaces by NSW Police.

== Early incidents and first media reports ==
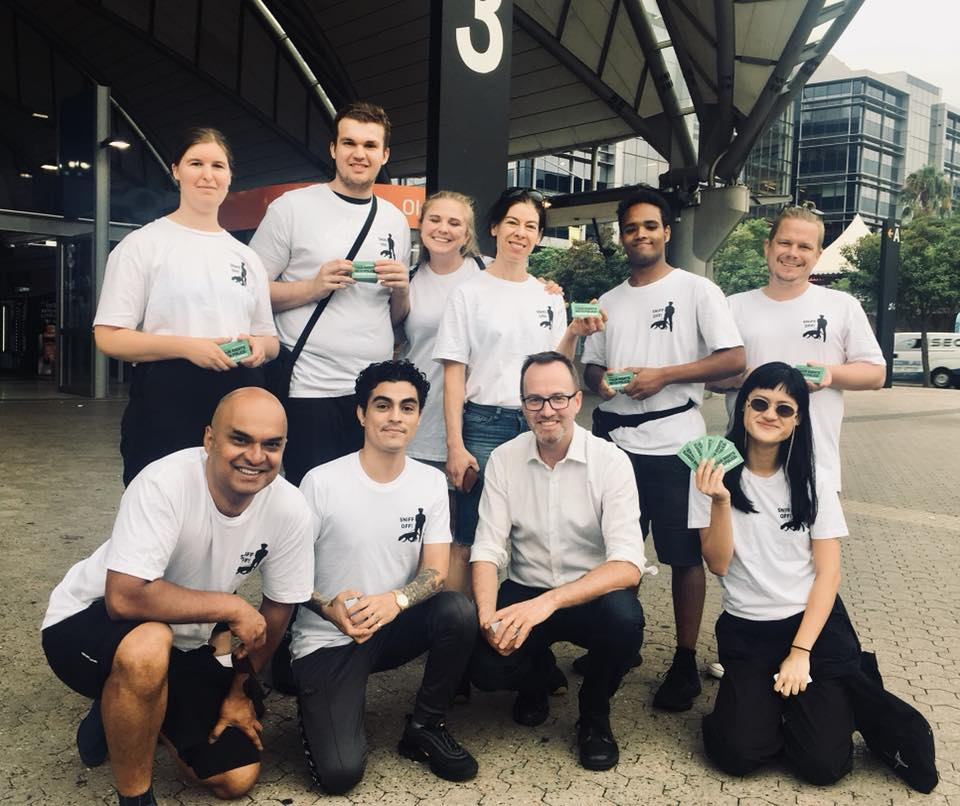
Former NSW Greens MP David Shoebridge with Sniff Off volunteers at a music festival in 2020

In 2011, drug detection dog operations came under renewed scrutiny when figures obtained by NSW Greens MP David Shoebridge revealed that in the nine months leading up to September, NSW Police had searched 14,102 people following an indication from a dog, with a "record 80 percent" of those searches failing to find any illicit drugs. Responding to these figures, NSW Police maintained that the dogs were "close to 100% accurate", arguing that in cases where no drugs had been found, a person had either admitted prior contact with drugs or was lying and drugs would have been recovered by a more "intrusive" search.

In 2009, an Ombudsman's report noted that NSW Police had used strip search tents at an event where drug detection dogs were present. In 2010, a commuter reported being made to strip naked at Redfern train station after being stopped by a drug detection dog. The issue of strip searches at music festivals was also discussed on the Triple J Hack program in 2012. In 2013, dozens of complaints alleging police brutality were made following the Sydney Gay and Lesbian Mardi Gras. In one case, a 53-year-old man was awarded damages after being strip searched at an afterparty event following a drug detection dog indication.

In October 2014, Shoebridge and the NSW Young Greens launched the "Sniff Off" Facebook page to share live reports on the location of current drug detection dog operations. Around this time, it was reported that attendees at music festivals were routinely being subjected to naked strip searches after drug detection dog indications, with some being told to squat. Figures obtained by Shoebridge showed that between 2009 and 2013, 3501 people were strip searched by NSW Police after being stopped by a drug detection dog. One 23-year-old man told the Sydney Morning Herald, "They take you into a room and make you squat down to make sure you aren't hiding anything. It's pretty invasive, embarrassing and uncomfortable". Speaking to Vice, another man said:

"It happens at festivals all the time. They've got booths set up to strip search you. It's basically a known thing that where there's sniffer dogs, they'll be strip searches as well".

Recalling an incident he'd witnessed at a music festival, drug educator Paul Dillon told Vice:

"I can remember one girl who was totally traumatised by the experience" ... "She'd been strip searched and was mortified. The girl had no drugs on her, was not a drug user, but had been through a very traumatic experience".

== Increased strip search numbers ==
A drug detection dog operation at Central Station in 2016

Figures obtained in 2018 showed that the number of strip searches conducted by NSW Police following drug detection dog indications more than doubled in the 12 months between 2016 and 2017, rising from 590 to 1,124. Separate data also revealed a 47% increase in the number of strip searches conducted outside police stations by NSW Police in the four years leading up to June 2018. When questioned by Greens MP David Shoebridge, Police Commissioner Mick Fuller denied that any change in policy was responsible for the increased figures. While some of these incidents were reported by smaller outlets, the issue of drug detection dog operations and police strip searches received limited media attention until mid-2018, when NSW Police announced plans to deny entry to event attendees after they had been stopped by a drug detection dog.

== Venue ban policy ==
In June 2018, NSW Police announced a controversial new policy which would see any ticketholder stopped by a drug detection dog denied entry to an upcoming Above and Beyond performance at Sydney Showground that weekend, even in cases where no drugs were found after a search.

Police will exclude any person from the venue that the drug dog indicates has or who has recently had drugs on them, regardless of whether drugs are located.

— NSW Police Assistant Commissioner Peter Thurtell

Drug detection dogs at the Above and Beyond performance at Sydney Showground in 2018. Ticket booths used to strip search attendees can be seen in the background

NSW Police had enforced a similar policy at two earlier events held at Sydney Showground that year. At Midnight Mafia in May, 187 patrons were refused entry, despite only 45 being found in possession of illicit drugs. Several attendees reported being subjected to strip searches before having their tickets confiscated by police. Speaking to the Sydney Morning Herald in 2019, one 20-year-old woman said she felt "scared" and "completely helpless" when she was made to strip naked in front of two female police officers inside a booth at the event. It was also reported that "about 40 people" were denied entry to A State of Trance in April after being stopped by a drug detection dog.

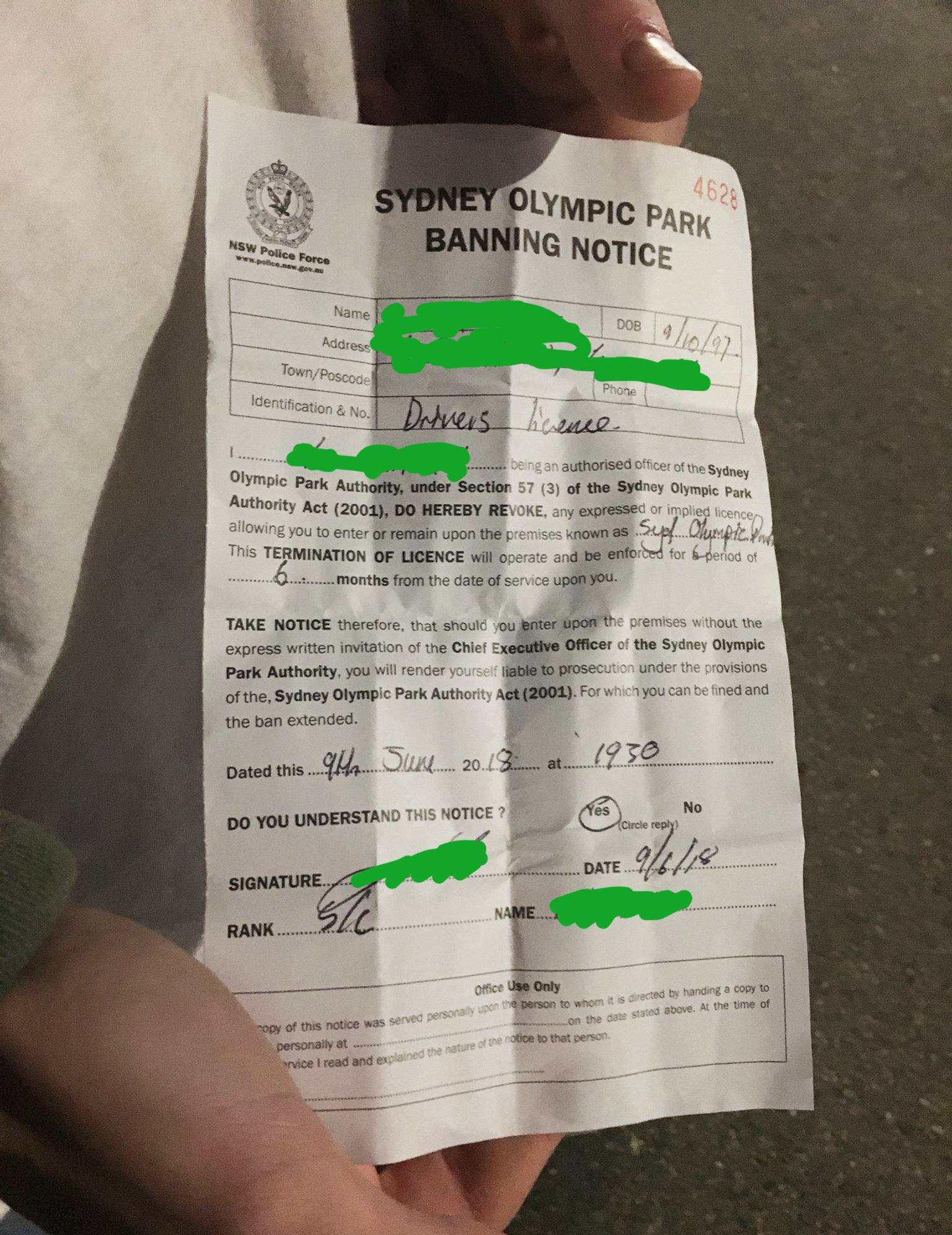
A ban notice issued to an Above and Beyond attendee prohibiting entry to Sydney Olympic Park for six months

In the lead-up to the Above & Beyond performance in June, the NSW Greens sought an injunction in the Supreme Court to prevent police from denying entry to patrons based on drug detection dog indications. The application was unsuccessful, and several attendees reported being strip searched and removed from Sydney Showground by police during the event. In one case, a woman said she was ejected after being made to "strip and squat" following a drug detection dog indication. Another woman reported being subjected to a naked strip search inside a booth after police witnessed her handing money to her boyfriend.

One attendee at the Above and Beyond performance was issued a ban notice prohibiting entry to Sydney Olympic Park for six months, allegedly after being strip searched following a drug detection dog indication. In December 2020, the Law Enforcement Conduct Commission noted several other cases where music festivals patrons had been banned from Sydney Olympic Park for 6 months after being strip searched, despite no drugs being found during those searches. These bans were issued by NSW Police under the Sydney Olympic Park Regulation. In June 2020, NSW Police informed the commission that it would stop issuing 6 month ban notices to music festival attendees after receiving legal advice.

== Attalla v State of NSW and release of internal police report ==
In May 2018, the District Court of New South Wales awarded $112,000 plus legal costs to a 53-year-old man who was strip searched after being arrested in 2015. Steven Attalla was sitting in front of a church in the early hours of the morning when he was approached by police who wanted to search him for drugs. He refused and was taken to Kings Cross police station, where he was made to strip naked, lift his genitals and squat in front of two officers. No drugs were found. Presiding Justice Phillip Taylor found that the officers involved had acted with an "almost reckless indifference" and described the search as an "invasive power without the slightest justification". The case was mentioned in a leaked internal police report published in November 2018, which acknowledged that officers were routinely breaking the law when conducting strip searches. The report also noted an increase in litigation brought against NSW Police over unlawful strip searches since 2013, which it described as an "organisational risk".

== Hidden Festival incident ==
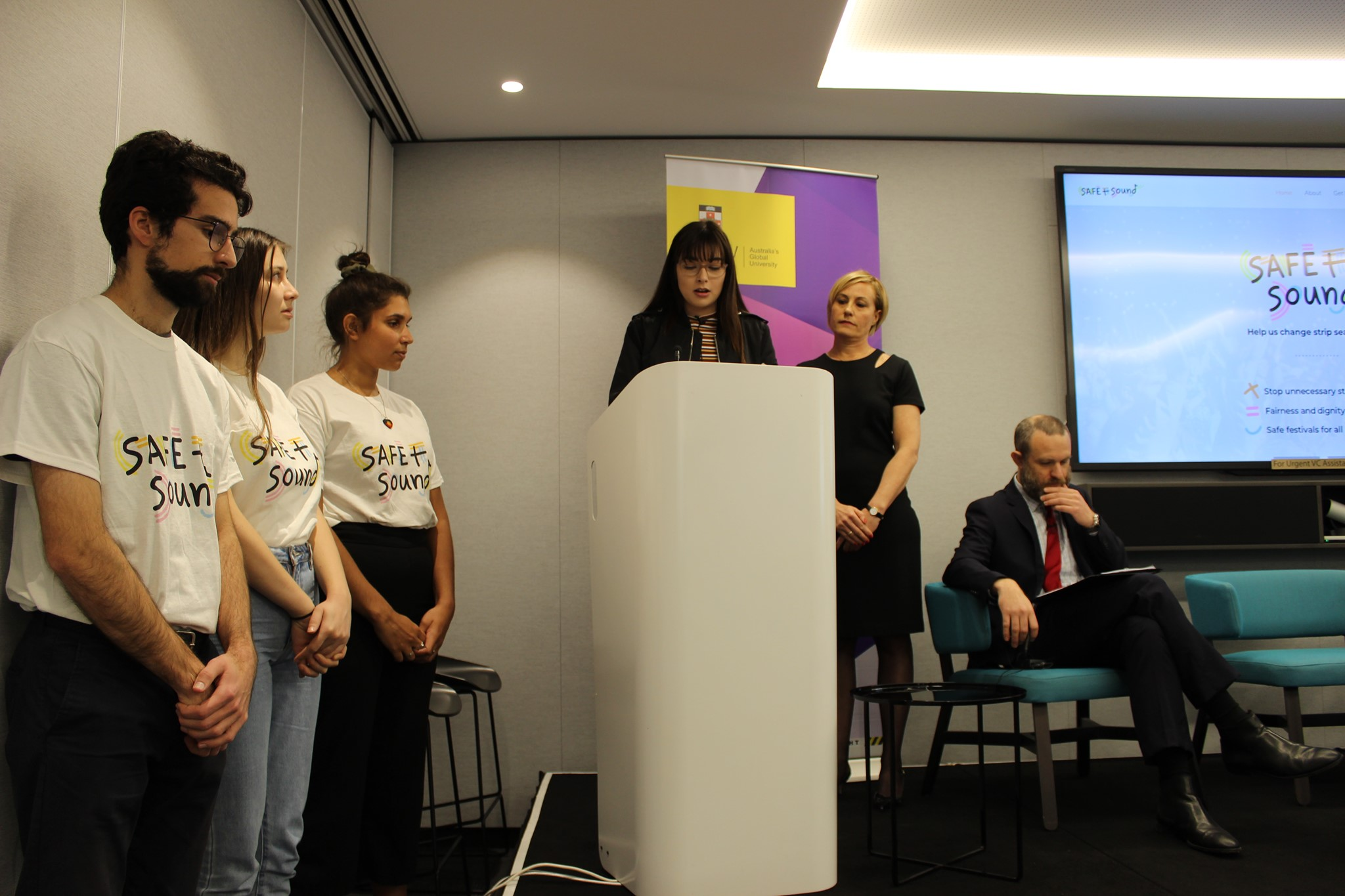
The 19-year-old speaking at the launch of a UNSW report into NSW Police strip searches in August 2019

In March 2019, a 19-year-old woman uploaded a post to Facebook alleging that she had been strip searched and banned from Sydney Olympic Park for six months after being stopped by police. She said she was entering the Hidden music festival earlier that week when she was approached by two officers with drug detection dogs. "I hadn't seen the dogs react or sit and they just told me that I had been detected and that I had follow them" she recalled in a later radio interview.

The woman said she was taken into a booth with a female officer, who ordered her to remove all her clothes and squat and cough while naked. She claimed that the door of the booth was left unlocked during the search, and that she was able to see other festivalgoers being searched in the adjoining booths. Despite no drugs being found, the woman was detained for more than an hour before being ejected from the event and banned from Sydney Olympic Park for 6 months for "intoxication". She said the experience left her feeling "humiliated and embarrassed".

The 19-year-old's post went viral on Facebook, attracting thousands of comments and reactions, including some from users who recalled being subjected to similar strip searches by NSW Police. The story was covered by multiple media outlets and marked the first case in New South Wales where a strip search following a drug detection dog indication received widespread public attention. In July 2020, an internal police investigation found there was "insufficient lawful basis" for the strip search and the 6-month ban notice issued to the woman. NSW Police acknowledged the booth used to conduct the search had been left unlocked, though claimed this was necessary for "officer safety". The report made adverse findings against two officers in relation to the ban notice, though it was unclear if any action would be taken in relation to the strip search. Earlier in June, The Guardian reported that one of the officers involved had since resigned.

== University of New South Wales report ==
In August 2019, a report examining the use of strip searches by NSW Police was released by University of New South Wales Law Academics Vicki Sentas and Michael Grewcock. The report had been commissioned by Redfern Legal Centre as part of its ongoing "Safe and Sound" Campaign. Key findings highlighted by the authors included a significant increase in the use of strip searches by NSW Police, with the report noting "an almost twentyfold increase in less than 12 years". The use of drug detection dogs, particularly at major events such as music festivals, was identified as a driving factor behind the increase. The report made 12 recommendations aimed at improving NSW Police strip search practices, including changing the law to better define what constitutes a search, and banning "deeply humiliating" practices such as asking a person to bend over or squat.

== Festival deaths inquest ==
In July 2019, the Coroners Court of New South Wales opened a joint inquest into the deaths of six music festival patrons who died after consuming fatal quantities of MDMA at separate events between December 2017 and January 2019. The inquest was overseen by NSW Deputy State Coroner Harriet Grahame. One of the deaths examined during the inquest was that of 18-year-old Nathan Tran, who died in hospital after consuming a fatal dose of MDMA at the Knockout Circuz music festival at Sydney Olympic Park in 2017. Tran was reportedly acting erratically before collapsing and hitting his head inside the venue. He became distressed and combative when approached by medical staff, leading police and security personnel to intervene and restrain him before he was taken to a medical tent.

"I had to take my top off and my bra, and I covered my boobs and she told me to put my hands up, and she told me to tell her where the drugs were. She said, 'If you don't tell me where the drugs are, I'm going to make this nice and slow'. She made me take my shorts off, and my underwear, and she made me squat and cough, and squat and cough, and squat and cough, and I had to turn around and squat and cough. She opened the door while I was still naked and handed the wallet to someone else then made me stand there for a bit."

— Testimony from a 28-year-old witness who was strip searched at the Knockout Circuz music festival in 2017.

One witness called to give evidence about Tran's death was a 28-year-old woman who had also attended the Knockout Circuz music festival in 2017. The woman, whose name was suppressed by the Court, testified that she witnessed police and security personnel attempting to restrain Tran while he was on the ground. When asked why she no longer attended music festivals in New South Wales, the witness broke down in tears as she described how police had strip searched her at the same event in 2017.

The 28-year-old told the court that after being stopped by a drug detection dog at the entrance to the festival, she was ordered to keep her hands locked in front of her body and was escorted to a booth, where a female officer instructed her to remove her clothing. The officer reportedly threatened to make the search "nice and slow" if she failed to produce any drugs, and was also alleged to have opened the door of the booth while she was still naked. The 28-year-old said that the experience made her feel "like a criminal". She also reported being strip searched by police at a separate event, with no drugs being found on either occasion.

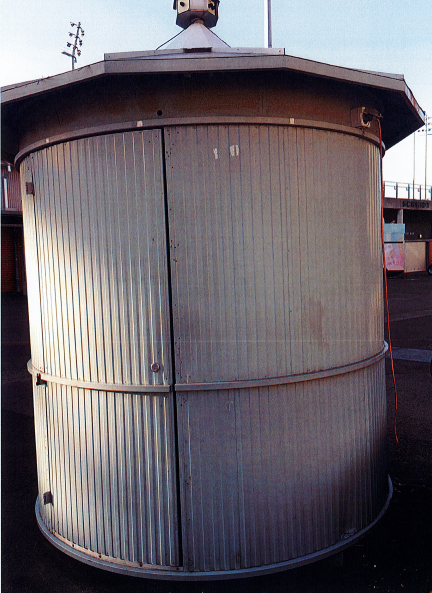
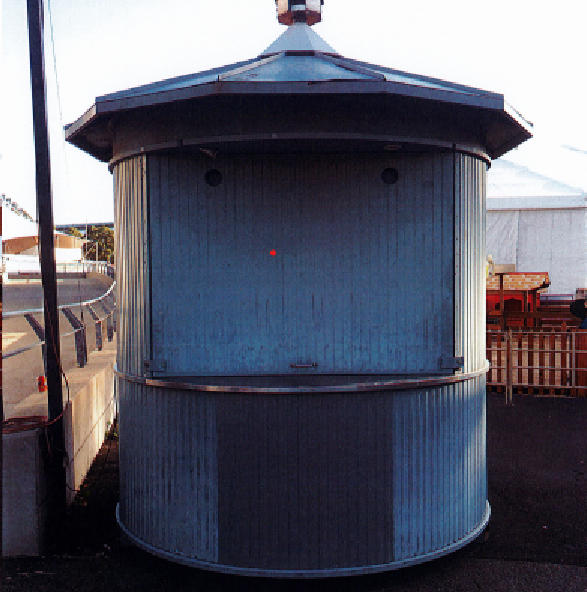
A ticket booth used by NSW Police to conduct strip searches during events held at Sydney Olympic Park

At a Parliamentary hearing in August, NSW Police Commissioner Mick Fuller criticised the woman's comments, suggesting it was a "disgrace" that he was being held to account on the testimony of a "secret witness". When the inquest resumed in September, Counsel Assisting the Coroner told the court that the woman's full name had been made available to all parties who were present at the hearing, including NSW Police. She went on to state that the Commissioner's barrister had questioned the woman and had been provided with her "non-existent" criminal history, as well as an opportunity to conduct background checks. "She was giving evidence about the death of Nathan Tran and in giving her answers, she rather spontaneously revealed she didn't go to festivals anymore because of the strip search incident. Unfortunately, the police commissioner misunderstood the circumstances of that evidence". It was later reported that the Commissioner had withdrawn his remarks.

In November 2019, Deputy State Coroner Harriet Grahame handed down her final report. In a controversial move, she called on the state government to establish a pill testing (also referred to as "drug checking") trial at upcoming music festivals in New South Wales. Grahame criticised NSW Police practices at these events, warning that the use of drug detection dogs may encourage risky behaviours such as "panic ingestion" or "preloading"—factors that may have contributed to the deaths of 19-year-old Alex Ross-King and 22-year-old Joshua Tam. She also raised concerns about strip searches at music festivals, describing the testimony of a 28-year-old woman strip searched in 2017 as "palpable and disturbing". Grahame suggested that many of these searches were being conducted "unlawfully" and recommended that they be limited to cases involving suspected drug supply or where a strip search is necessary to prevent an immediate risk to safety.

== Law Enforcement Conduct Commission investigation ==
In October 2018, the Law Enforcement Conduct Commission (LECC) launched a formal investigation into the use of strip searches by NSW Police. As part of its two-year inquiry, the Commission held several closed-door investigations concerning specific complaints, as well as two public hearings in relation to strip searches of minors at separate music festivals in 2018 and 2019.

"I removed my jacket and gave it to her. I watched the police officer search my jacket and nothing was found. She put my jacket on the ground and she told me to take off my shorts. I took off my shorts and gave them to her. She then searched my shorts. The police officer then told me to remove my leotard. I pulled my leotard down to my waist. The police officer then told me to take everything off, including my underwear. I said to her words to the effect of, "Completely, everything?" At that point, I realised I was going to have to get naked in front of this police officer. I could not believe that this was happening to me. I could not stop crying. I was completely humiliated."

— An excerpt from the statement of a 16-year-old girl who was strip searched at the Splendour in the Grass music festival in 2018.

In October 2019, the Commission held a four-day public hearing to investigate the case of a 16-year-old girl who was left "crying uncontrollably" after being strip searched at the 2018 Splendour in the Grass music festival. The inquiry heard that the girl had been stopped by a drug detection dog at the festival entrance and was taken into a tent, where she was made to strip completely naked and squat while a female officer "squatted down and looked underneath" her. She was also required to remove her pantyliner so it could be inspected. The officer who conducted the search acknowledged that the entrance to the tent did not fully close, describing the setup as "not ideal". The LECC was told that 143 strip searches were carried out at the event in 2018, with over 90% resulting in no drugs being found. In one case, a male officer strip searched 19 festivalgoers, with only a single valium tablet being recovered.

In May 2020, the Commission found that the strip search of the 16-year-old was "unlawful". It concluded that police had failed to comply with legal requirements mandating the presence of a support person when strip searching a person under the age of 18, that there were no "reasonable grounds" to justify the search and that the actions of the officer conducting the search were also unlawful. The Commission found that the tent used to carry out the search did not offer reasonable privacy, that officers lacked awareness of the legal requirements for conducting strip searches, and that police record keeping at the event was inadequate. In one case, a female officer admitted to "guesstimating" drug quantities when asked to explain discrepancies on official paperwork. Responding to the findings, NSW Police Commissioner Mick Fuller said he was "disappointed" with the conduct of officers who had strip searched the 16-year-old.

In November 2019, the LECC held a second four-day public hearing to investigate allegations from three teenage boys who had been strip searched at an under-18s music festival at Sydney Olympic Park in February that year. The boys were attending the Lost City music festival, where the Commission was told that NSW Police had strip searched 30 attendees. In one case, a 15-year-old boy was taken to a booth, instructed to remove his pants and underwear, and was allegedly told to "hold your dick and lift your balls up and show me your gooch" after being stopped by a drug detection dog. In all three cases it investigated, the Commission found that officers had acted "unlawfully". It also found that police record keeping at the event was unsatisfactory and criticised the decision to have SES volunteers act as witnesses during strip searches.

In a final report handed down in December 2020, the Commission made 25 recommendations aimed at improving NSW Police strip search practices, including recommending that parliament clarify whether it was legal to ask a person to squat or spread their buttocks during a search. The Commission found that officers were routinely failing to comply with legal requirements when conducting strip searches, describing this as a "recurrent issue". The Commission also noted that there had been a "significant increase" in the number and proportion of strip searches following a drug detection dog indication over the five years between 2014 and 2019.

== Class action ==
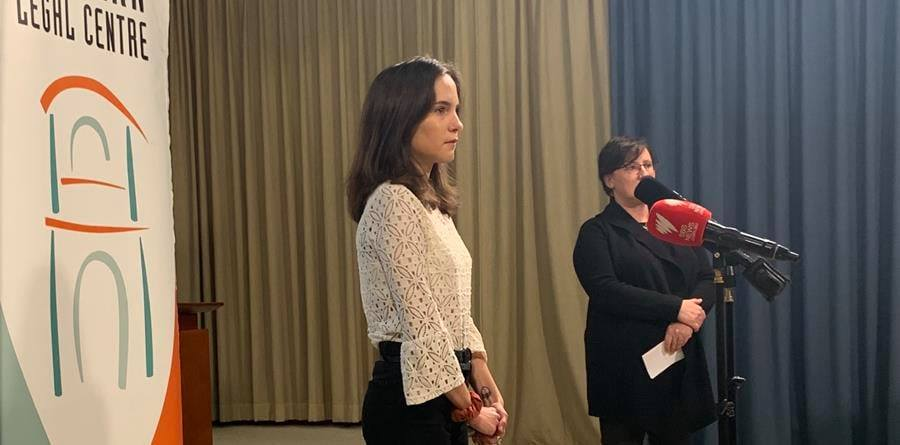
A 25-year-old woman who was strip searched at a music festival in 2017 speaking at the launch of the class action in Sydney

In May 2020, Slater and Gordon announced that it would be partnering with Redfern Legal Centre to investigate the possibility of bringing a class action against NSW Police. The proposed class action would apply to unlawful strip searches conducted by NSW Police since 2014. In July 2022, class action documents were filed in the Supreme Court of New South Wales. Contrary to previous announcements, the class action applies to unlawful strip searches conducted at music festivals by NSW Police from July 2016 onwards.

Lead plaintiff for the class action is a woman who was strip searched at the Splendour in the Grass music festival in 2018. The woman, who was 27 at the time, was stopped by a drug detection dog on her way into the festival. She was taken to a search area where police had set up several open cubicles made from "tarpaulin-like material". The woman was taken into a cubicle with a female officer and was made to lift her breasts, bend over and remove a tampon. A male officer walked in on the search while the woman was bent over and naked from the waist down. She described the experience as "degrading, scary and confusing".

In April 2025, the NSW Government admitted that the lead plaintiff was strip searched "unlawfully" but rejected suggestions of wrongdoing in other cases and denied that the officers involved were employed by NSW Police at the time. A trial for the class action began in the Supreme Court in May 2025, with more than 3000 group members enrolled.

== Statistical data ==
Number of strip searches conducted by New South Wales Police
	2014–2015	2015–2016	2016–2017	2017–2018	2018–2019	2019–2020	Total
Strip searches in the field (Conducted outside of a police station i.e. at music festivals, train stations, licensed venues)	3735	5082	4429	5459	5382	3748	27,835
Strip searches in custody (Conducted at a police station)	N/A	N/A	9469	9381	6827	4285	29,962

Searches conducted after drug detection dog indications (UNSW report data)
	2009	2010	2011	2012	2013	2014	2015	2016	2017	Total
Total number of personal searches	17,321	15,779	18,821	16,184	17,746	9518	12,893	9497	10,224	127,983
Number of strip searches	556	773	725	712	735	624	629	590	1124	6468

Searches conducted after drug detection dog indications (LECC data)
	2014–2015	2015–2016	2016–2017	2017–2018	2018–2019	2019–2020	Total
Total of number personal searches	14,243	10,208	9630	10,800	12,037	6384	63,302
Number of strip searches	619	663	681	1518	1685	493	5659

Drug detection dog statistics (September 2023 data)
	Number of drug detection dog deployments	Number of personal searches conducted	Searches where no drugs were found	Percentage of searches where drugs were found
2013	2128	13,720	10,622	22.58%
2014	2708	14,213	11,495	19.12%
2015	2574	12,493	9423	24.57%
2016	2174	8746	5906	32.47%
2017	1999	9523	6795	28.65%
2018	1770	9811	7229	26.32%
2019	2008	10,760	8330	22.58%
2020	1471	2259	1611	28.69%
2021	1535	2475	1756	29.05%
2022	1447	6529	4887	25.15%
2023 (to 30 June)	663	4006	2859	28.63%
Total	20,477	94,535	70,913	24.99%

=== Questions about the accuracy of figures provided by New South Wales Police ===
==== Drug detection dog statistics ====
In October 2019, Police Minister David Elliott tabled figures in Parliament detailing the number of personal searches carried out by NSW Police after drug detection dog indications. The figures were provided in response to questions by NSW Greens MP David Shoebridge. The data showed that in the eight-year period between 1 July 2011 and 30 June 2019, NSW Police had conducted 96,425 personal searches on individuals stopped by drug detection dogs, with illicit drugs found in 24.3% of those searches.

In November 2019, NSW Police Commissioner Mick Fuller was asked about coronial inquest recommendations calling for an end to drug detection dog operations at music festivals. Speaking to ABC Radio, Fuller rejected claims that the dogs were inaccurate, stating: "The stats are clear that nearly in 40 per cent of cases, when the dog sits down we find drugs." His comments were later investigated by ABC Fact Check, which concluded in December that the claim was "overstated", referencing figures tabled to Parliament in October by Police Minister David Elliott. In January 2020, the ABC was provided with revised data showing that between 1 July 2011 and 30 June 2019, 100,047 personal searches had been conducted following drug dog indications, with illicit drugs found in 32.7% of cases. A police spokesperson told the ABC that the earlier figures had been compiled differently, were not peer-reviewed, and were incorrect. The revised statistics were tabled to Parliament in February. In response, ABC Fact Check made the "unprecedented" decision to suspend its verdict, citing a lack of confidence in the data provided. "While the NSW Police maintain the information tabled in Parliament in October is "incorrect" and the new information is "accurate", Fact Check does not consider that it has received a sufficient explanation as to how the two sets of numbers were derived" said the ABC.

==== Strip search statistics ====
In December 2020, the Law Enforcement Conduct Commission expressed concerns about the way strip search data was recorded by NSW Police. The Commission noted figures which showed that approximately one third of all strip searches conducted outside of a police station between July 2016 and June 2020 had resulted in prohibited items being found. In some cases, NSW Police claimed that items such as bicycles, books, luggage and electrical appliances were recovered during those searches. The Commission pointed out that these items had most likely been recovered before a strip search was conducted. In a submission to the LECC, NSW Police maintained that this was a "recording error" which accounted for "less than 1%" of incidents. Despite this, the Commission expressed doubt about the police figures and concluded that they were "unreliable".

== Official responses from New South Wales Police ==
In a statement provided to the Sydney Morning Herald in August 2019, a spokesperson for NSW Police defended the use of strip searches by the organisation. "The NSW Police Force is responsible for enforcing legislation on drug and weapon possession and supply. Police officers do not enjoy carrying out strip searches, but it is a power that has been entrusted to us and searches reveal drugs and weapons", they said. "People who are trying to hide such items frequently secrete them in private places, and the only way to locate them is by a strip search, which may involve asking the person to squat".

The statement also went on to defend the use of drug detection dogs as a means of justifying strip searches, arguing that they act as a "vital tool for detection of drugs, particularly at large scale events". Excerpts from the same statement have also been provided to other media outlets in response to separate inquiries.

=== 2019 Daily Telegraph interview ===
Responding to recommendations made by Deputy State Coroner Grahame to limit the use of strip searches at music festivals, Police Commissioner Mick Fuller defended the practice in an interview with Sydney's Daily Telegraph. Appearing in a front page exclusive published on 18 November, Fuller warned that any attempt to curtail police search strip powers would lead to an increase in knife crime, citing Melbourne and London as examples. "You look at London. They decrease their person searches by 20,000 because of a government policy position and knife crime went through the roof," he said. The Commissioner went on to suggest that questioning "the legitimacy of policing" had "a negative impact on public safety" before insisting that young people "on the verge of criminality" should have "a little bit of fear" of police. "There will be a generation of kids that have no respect for authority and no respect for the community" he warned. "They need to have respect and a little bit of fear for law enforcement".

Speaking to Ray Hadley on 2GB later that day, the Commissioner reiterated his position. "The reality is I want there to be a small factor of fear so that young people aren't coming into town with bladed weapons". During an interview on ABC Radio the following morning, Fuller attempted to clarify his remarks, insisting that his comments to the Daily Telegraph were not made in relation to strip searches but were instead aimed at addressing the use of police powers more broadly. "Knife crime is a huge problem, not just in Australia, but I'm not talking about strip searching people for drugs when I talk about fear," he said.

== See also ==
- Royal Commission into the New South Wales Police Service
- Tasty nightclub raid
