= List of apocalyptic and post-apocalyptic fiction =

Apocalyptic fiction is a subgenre of science fiction that is concerned with the end of civilization due to a potentially existential catastrophe such as nuclear warfare, pandemic diseases, extraterrestrial attack, impact event, cybernetic revolt, technological singularity, dysgenics, supernatural phenomena, divine judgment, climate change, resource depletion, or some other general disaster. Post-apocalyptic fiction is set in a world or civilization after such a disaster. The time frame may be immediately after the catastrophe, focusing on the travails or psychology of survivors, or considerably later, often including the theme that the existence of pre-catastrophe civilization has been forgotten (or mythologized).

Apocalypse is a Greek word referring to the end of the world. Apocalypticism is the religious belief that there will be an apocalypse, a term which originally referred to a revelation of God's will, but now usually refers to the belief that the end of the world is imminent, even within one's own lifetime. Apocalypticism is one aspect of eschatology in certain religions, the part of theology concerned with the final events of human history, or the ultimate destiny of humanity (societal collapse, human extinction, and so on). It often involves themes like God's judgment, salvation of the faithful, and the eventual establishment of a renewed world.

Apocalyptic fiction does not portray catastrophes, or disasters, or near-disasters that do not result in apocalypse. A threat of an apocalypse does not make a piece of fiction apocalyptic. For example, Armageddon and Deep Impact are considered disaster films and not apocalyptic fiction because, although Earth or humankind are terribly threatened, in the end they manage to avoid destruction. Apocalyptic fiction is not the same as fiction that provides visions of a dystopian future. George Orwell's Nineteen Eighty-Four, for example, is dystopian fiction, not apocalyptic fiction.

== Works of apocalyptic and post-apocalyptic fiction ==
Format	Year	Cause	Title	Author	Notes
Prophetic writings	c. 95 AD	Supernatural	Apocalypse of John	Unknown	Regarded as the most influential apocalyptic text in the history of Christianity.
Prophetic writings	c. 70–150	Supernatural	Apocalypse of Abraham	Unknown	
Prophetic writings	2nd–4th century	Supernatural	Apocalypse of Thomas	Unknown	
Prophetic writings	629–636	Supernatural	Apocalypse of Zerubbabel	Unknown	
Novel	13th century	Impact event	Theologus Autodidactus	Ibn al-Nafis	
Novel	1805	Human decline	Le Dernier Homme	Jean-Baptiste Cousin de Grainville	Regarded as the first story of modern speculative fiction to depict the end of the world.
Poem	1816	Sun	"Darkness"	Lord Byron	Describes the end of life on planet Earth after the Sun's extinction.
Novel	1826	Disease	The Last Man	Mary Shelley	
Novel	1872	Technology	"The Book of Machines"		The novel Erewhon's section "The Book of Machines"
Novel	1885	War	After London	Richard Jefferies	The nature of the catastrophe is never stated, except that apparently most of the human race quickly dies out, leaving England to revert to nature.
Novel	1889	Eco	The Last American	John Ames Mitchell	A satirical novel depicting the ruins of American civilization in the distant future, discovered by Persian explorers.
Novel	1893	Impact Event	La Fin du monde	Camille Flammarion	A novel depicting the approach of a comet that threatens to collide with Earth, causing worldwide catastrophe and the eventual destruction of civilization.
Novel	1895	Sun	The Time Machine	H. G. Wells	Towards the end of the book the Time Traveler witnesses the Sun's expansion, causing the death of all life on Earth.
Novel	1898	Aliens	The War of the Worlds	H. G. Wells	
Novel	1901	Eco	The Purple Cloud	M. P. Shiel	A volcanic eruption floods the world with cyanide gas.
Story	1906	Sun	"Finis"	Frank Lillie Pollock	Where a second Sun's light incinerates Earth
Novel	1906	Unspecified	The Doomsman	Van Tassel Sutphen	Set ninety years after a devastating catastrophe in 1925, the novel depicts the ruins of New York City and a future society that has regressed to medieval-like tribal communities, with castles, archery, and feudal customs.
Novel	1908	Supernatural	Lord of the World	Robert Hugh Benson	
Story	1909	Technology	The Machine Stops	E. M. Forster	A short story emphasizing machinery instead of computers
Novel	1910	Eco	La Mort de la Terre	J.-H. Rosny aîné	Set in the far future, the novel depicts Earth as an immense desert where dwindling human communities struggle with water shortages and environmental collapse. Meanwhile, a new life-form, the "ferromagnetals" ("les ferromagnétaux"), emerges and spreads throughout the planet.
Novel	1912	Disease	The Scarlet Plague	Jack London	Sixty years after an uncontrollable epidemic named the Red Death has depopulated the planet, James Howard Smith tries to impart the value of knowledge and wisdom to his grandsons
Novel	1912	Sun	The Night Land	William Hope Hodgson	The Sun burns out and the last of humanity is sheltered in an arcology from the hostile environment and the creatures adapted for it
Novel	1913	Unspecified	La Force mystérieuse	J.-H. Rosny aîné	An unexplained cosmic phenomenon disrupts the laws of physics, weakening light, heat, electricity and other forms of energy. A worldwide catastrophe causes mass death, widespread madness and violence, bringing humanity close to extinction.
Novella	1913	Impact Event	"The Poison Belt"	Arthur Conan Doyle	The Earth passes through a belt of poisonous ether in space, causing the near-extinction of humanity and other forms of life. A group of survivors escape death by breathing oxygen in a sealed room.
Novel	1913	Disease	Goslings: A World of Women	J. D. Beresford	A global plague has decimated England's male population and the once-predictable Gosling family is now free to fulfill its long-frustrated desires
Novel	1914	Unspecified	Darkness and Dawn	George Allan England	Two characters wake from suspended animation and find that some great disaster has torn an enormous chasm in Earth and created a second Moon
Novel	1916	War	The Lost Continent	Edgar Rice Burroughs	
Play	1921	Technology	R.U.R.	Karel Čapek	Notable for coining the term "robot"
Novel	1926	Aliens	The Moon Men	Edgar Rice Burroughs	The series comprising The Moon Maid, with the action set on the Moon; The Moon Men, set in 2120 after the Kalkars have invaded Earth; and The Red Hawk, which jumps to 2430 and in which the Great Feud reaches its climax.
Novel	1922	War	Theodore Savage (vt. Lest Ye Die)	E. F. Bleiler, Richard Bleiler, Cicely Hamilton.	Science-Fiction: The Early Years. Kent State University Press, 1990. (p. 331). ISBN 9780873384162.
Film	1924	Disease	The Last Man on Earth		A disease kills all men over 14 years old, but 10 years later, one is found still alive and hilarity ensues. Based on the 1923 novelette of the same name by John D. Swain. Was remade in 1933 as the musical It's Great to Be Alive.
Novel	1926	Technology	The Metal Giants	Edmond Hamilton	
Novel	1928, 1929	Eco	Deluge and Dawn	S. Fowler Wright	A huge flood devastates the world; only the English Midlands survive
Novel	1929	Technology	Automata	S. Fowler Wright	
Novel	1930	Various	Last and First Men	Olaf Stapledon	18 successive human near extinctions are described.
Novel	1931	Technology	The War of the Giants	Fletcher Pratt	
Novel	1932	War	Tomorrow's Yesterday	John Gloag	
Film	1933	Eco	Deluge		Deluge is a 1933 American apocalyptic science fiction film, directed by Felix E. Feist and released by RKO Radio Pictures.
Novel	1933	War	The Shape of Things to Come	Wells, H. G.	Predicting an extended world war fought with modern scientific weapons, societal upheaval, and the beginning of space travel. Filmed as Things to Come in 1936.
Novel	1934	War	Quinzinzinzili	Régis Messac	Predicting a great world war that ends with the vanishing of humanity. Only a group of children survives and forms a strange new humanity.
Novel	1934	War	The Black Flame	Stanley G. Weinbaum	Comprises two novellas, Dawn of Flame and The Black Flame, with a common character, Black Margot, a.k.a. Margaret of Urbs, a.k.a. the Black Flame
Story	1934	Technology	"Rex"	Harl Vincent	
Novel	1935	Technology	Nightmare Number Three	Stephen Vincent Benét	
Film	1936	War	Things to Come		A future Second World War leads to a breakdown of civilization in most of the world, with technology returning to medieval levels by 1970.
Novel	1936	War	Wild Harbour	Ian MacPherson	A war much worse than World War I leads to complete social collapse in Great Britain
Story	1937	War	By the Waters of Babylon	Stephen Vincent Benét	
Radio	1938, 1943	Eco	"Oxychloride X"	Arch Oboler	An episode of Oboler's popular 1930s and 1940s radio horror and mystery anthology serial Lights Out. A deranged university chemistry student creates what turns out to be a "super-dissolving substance", with the potential, among other uses, to become "a doomsday chemical superweapon".
Radio	1938, 1968–1973	Aliens	"The War of the Worlds"	Orson Welles	The radio play, originally directed and narrated by Welles and premiered on The Mercury Theater on the Air, later remade for local broadcast by, and over, station WKBW (now WWKB)-AM, in Buffalo, New York.
Novel	1939	War	The Death Guard	Philip George Chadwick	When a near-invincible army of artificially created soldiers – the Flesh Guard – falls into the hands of an untrustworthy power, continental Europe forms an alliance and invades Great Britain. The resulting carnage, involving poisonous electric gas, "humanite" (atomic) bombs, and the unfeeling march of the Flesh Guard, reduces whole cities and towns in Europe to smoking rubble.
Film	1939	War	Peace on Earth	Hugh Harman	A cartoon short where animals rebuild a post-apocalyptic world after humanity has fought war to the point of extinction
Story	1941	War	"Magic City"	Nelson S. Bond	
Story	1941	Eclipse	"Nightfall"	Isaac Asimov	
Play	1942	War (also ice age and flood)	The Skin of Our Teeth	Thornton Wilder	
Novel	1943	War	Gather, Darkness	Fritz Leiber	
Story	1944	Eco	"The Great Fog"	Gerald Heard	A mildew-generated fog appears to undermine civilization.
Novel	1945	Sun	Rescue Party	Arthur C. Clarke	
Radio	1946	War	The Fifth Horseman (radio play)		Early (post-World War II) radio docudrama series originally aired over the now-defunct NBC Radio network. This "rare and unusual" series of shows (featuring many top Hollywood film performers of that era) was written, produced, and directed by Arnold Marquis, as part of a special postwar campaign aimed at convincing the public to place the then-newly developed technologies of nuclear energy and weaponry under United Nations control.
Novel	1946	Eco	Mr. Adam	Pat Frank	Depicts a world in which a nuclear power plant explosion renders the entire male population infertile
Novel	1947	Technology	With Folded Hands	Jack Williamson	
Novel, Screenplay	1948	War	Ape and Essence	Aldous Huxley	
Story	1949	War	"Let the Ants Try"	Frederik Pohl (under the pseudonym James MacCreigh)	
Novel	1949	Disease	Earth Abides	George R. Stewart	
Story	1949	War	"Not with a Bang"	Damon Knight	
Story	1949	Impact Event	"The Big Eye"	Max Simon Ehrlich	
Story	1949	War	"Time to Rest"	John Wyndham	Short story sequel "No Place Like Earth"
Novel	1950	War	Shadow on the Hearth	Judith Merril	Later adapted for television in 1954
Novel	1950	War	Pebble in the Sky	Isaac Asimov	A later book, Robots and Empire, gave a different explanation
Story	1950	War	"Dear Devil"	Eric Frank Russell	
Story	1950	War	"There Will Come Soft Rains"	Ray Bradbury	Short story in The Martian Chronicles, which shares the title and themes of the poem by Sarah Teasdale.
Story	1950	Disease	"The City"	Ray Bradbury	
Radio	1951	War	"The Last Objective"	Paul Carter	Adapted by Ernest Kinoy for NBC Radio's 1950–1951 sci-fi anthology series, Dimension X. A military android questions its continued existence, after the last of its human comrade-counterparts dies out from the effects of a mysterious doomsday super-weapon that was unleashed at the end of a generations-long global atomic war.
Film	1951	War	Five	Arch Oboler	The film shows the aftermath of a nuclear war, centered on a group of five survivors
Story	1951	Disease	"The Visitor"	Ray Bradbury	Short story in The Illustrated Man
Film	1951	Impact Event	When Worlds Collide		Scientists discover that a star named Bellus is on a collision course with Earth.
Novel	1951	Impact Event, Monsters, Disease	The Day of the Triffids	John Wyndham	Initially thought to be a blinding meteor shower, but later suggested to be a man-made satellite based weapon accidentally discharged, allowing the bio-engineered Triffids (a type of plant) to dominate
Novel	1951	Aliens	The Puppet Masters	Robert A. Heinlein	
Story	1951	Technology	"The Last Revolution"	Lord Dunsany	
Novel	1951	Social Collapse	Foundation	Asimov, Isaac	Mathematician Hari Seldon foresees the fall of the Galactic Empire, which encompasses the entire Milky Way
Film	1952	War	Captive Women		A new primitive society emerges long after a nuclear war. The film portrays tribes called the "Norms", the "Upriver People", and the "Mutates" fighting in the remains of New York City.
Film	1952	War	Invasion USA		
Novel	1952	War	Star Man's Son	Andre Norton	Also published as Daybreak: 2250 A.D. and Star Man's Son: 2250 A.D.
Story	1952	Eco	"The Birds"	Daphne du Maurier	Made into the 1963 film The Birds by Alfred Hitchcock, in which birds begin launching spontaneous mass attacks against humanity
Novel	1952	Human decline	City	Clifford D. Simak	
Story	1953	War	"Second Variety"	Philip K. Dick	basis for the movie Screamers
Film	1953	Aliens	The War of the Worlds		Based on the H. G. Wells novel of the same name
Novel	1953	Aliens	The Kraken Wakes	John Wyndham	
Novel	1953	Future collapse	Against the Fall of Night	Arthur C. Clarke	An early version of The City and the Stars
Story	1953	Supernatural	"The Nine Billion Names of God"	Arthur C. Clarke	A short story taken from the short story collection of the same name
Novel	1953	Human decline	Childhood's End	Arthur C. Clarke	
Novel	1954	War	Tomorrow!	Philip Wylie	Cautionary (for its time) civil defense-themed "tale of two cities": one (fictional) American city is ready for nuclear World War III, while the other is not
Play	1954	War	The Offshore Island	Marghanita Laski	
Novel	1954	Disease	I Am Legend	Richard Matheson	A vampire apocalypse novel, adapted to film as The Last Man on Earth (1964), The Omega Man (1971), I Am Legend (2007), and I Am Omega (2007)
Novel	1954	Disease	Some Will Not Die	Algis Budrys	
Story	1954	Technology	"Slaves To The Metal Horde"	Milton Lesser	
Story	1954	Technology	"Answer"	Fredric Brown	
Story	1954	Social Collapse	"The Last of the Masters"	Philip K. Dick	Short story (novelette) taking place 200 years after a global anarchist revolution, where society has stagnated due to the loss of scientific knowledge during the revolt. Elsewhere, the last government, a highly centralized and efficient society, is in hiding from the Anarchist League, a global militia preventing the recreation of any government.
Film	1955	War	Day the World Ended	Danel Wojick	
Novel	1955	War	The Chrysalids	John Wyndham	U.S. title: Re-Birth – the aftermath of a nuclear war in a rural Canadian community
Novel	1955	War	The Long Tomorrow	Leigh Brackett	In the aftermath of a nuclear war scientific knowledge is feared and restricted.
Film	1956	War	World Without End	Edward Bernd	Starring Hugh Marlowe, Rod Taylor – robust 20th Century men – narrowly escaping the ubiquitous "time warp" – kill giant spiders, help pale nerds and their beautiful women emerge from underground, and retake the post-World War III surface from troglodyte mutants
Novel	1956	War	The World Jones Made	Philip K. Dick	
Story	1956	Human decline	To Serve The Master	Philip K. Dick	
Story	1956	War	"The Last Word"	Damon Knight	
Story	1956	Impact Event	"A Pail of Air"	Fritz Leiber	A small family struggles to survive at temperatures near absolute zero after Earth is ripped from its solar orbit
Film	1956	Aliens	Invasion of the Body Snatchers		Based on the novel The Body Snatchers by Jack Finney
Novel	1956	Future collapse	The City and the Stars	Arthur C. Clarke	After the loss of a galactic empire, humanity is restricted to the single city of Diaspar, but lives a life of eternal comfort and safety. Alvin escapes and finds the truth – forcing his city to face the universe again.
Novel	1956	Eco	The Death of Grass	John Christopher	A virus that destroys plants causes massive famine and the breakdown of society. Made into the film No Blade of Grass
Poem	1956	War	"The Horses"	Edwin Muir	Deals with society's regression to pre-Industrial Revolution conditions in the wake of a nuclear war
Novel	1957	War	On the Beach	Nevil Shute	Also the films based on the book
Novel	1957	Social Collapse	Atlas Shrugged	Ayn Rand	American society slowly collapses after the country's leading industrialists mysteriously disappear
Film	1958	War	Teenage Caveman		
Novel	1958	Eco	The Year When Stardust Fell	Raymond F. Jones	The world's machinery grinds to a halt after comet dust arrives
Film	1958	War	Terror from the Year 5000		
Television	1958	War	"Doomsday For Dyson"	J. B. Priestley	A made-for-television play. Tom Dyson is suddenly caught up in the chaos of a nuclear war. Several of the issues brought up in the programme were discussed in an hour-long debate following its conclusion.
Television	1958	War	"Underground"		A group of survivors from an atomic war become trapped in an underground station; during the play, broadcast live on Armchair Theatre, one of the actors (Gareth Jones) actually died while the show was on the air.
Novel	1958	War	Red Alert	Peter George	Filmed as Dr. Strangelove or: How I Learned to Stop Worrying and Love the Bomb by Stanley Kubrick
Poem	1958–1970	Human decline	"Bedtime Story"	George MacBeth	A poem from Collected Poems 1958–1970
Film	1959	War	On the Beach	Stanley Kramer	Starring Gregory Peck, Fred Astaire, Anthony Perkins and Ava Gardner – the crew of an American submarine finds temporary safety from the fallout in Australia after the nuclear holocaust (from the 1957 novel by Nevil Shute)
Film	1959	War	The World, the Flesh and the Devil		Adapted from M.P. Shiel's The Purple Cloud.
Story	1959	Future collapse	"Transfusion"	Chad Oliver	
Television	1959	War	The Offshore Island	Marghanita Laski	A TV adaptation of a play by Laski.
Film	1959	Eco, monsters	The Giant Behemoth		
Novel	1959	War	Alas, Babylon	Pat Frank	The aftermath of a nuclear war in a rural Florida community
Novel	1959	War	A Canticle for Leibowitz	Walter M. Miller Jr.	Plus a sequel called Saint Leibowitz and the Wild Horse Woman (1997)
Novel	1959	War	Level 7	Mordecai Roshwald	
Film	1959	War	The Final War	Shigeaki Hidaka	A Japanese film about a third world war that is started when the U.S. accidentally drops a nuclear bomb on South Korea (Japanese title: Dai-sanji sekai taisen: Yonju-ichi jikan no kyofu)
Television	1959–1987	War	The Twilight Zone – numerous episodes and its revivals		"Time Enough at Last" (1959); "Two" (1961); "The Old Man in the Cave" (1963); "A Little Peace and Quiet" (1985); "Quarantine" (1986); "Shelter Skelter" (1987); and "Voices in the Earth" (1987)
Film	1960	War	Atomic War Bride		A Yugoslavian science fiction drama film directed by Veljko Bulajic.
Film	1960	War	The Time Machine		had an atomic war explain the downfall of civilization
Film	1960	Eco	The Last Woman on Earth		The Earth's oxygen levels drop suddenly, suffocating most life–survivors in an oxygen-producing jungle. It is speculated that this happened because of "a bigger and better bomb", but the reasons are not made clear.
Film	1960	Eco	Beyond the Time Barrier		X-plane arrives in future after solar radiation catastrophe
Film	1961	War	The Last War	Shūe Matsubayashi	A Japanese film about World War III (Japanese title: Sekai daisenso)
Novel	1961	War	Dark Universe	Daniel F Galouye	
Film	1961	Eco	Voyage to the Bottom of the Sea		The Van Allen belt catches on fire.
Poem	1961	War	"Your Attention Please"	Peter Porter	Written in the style of a radio broadcast warning of an impending nuclear attack
Novel	1961	Eco	The Wind from Nowhere	J. G. Ballard	Ballard's first published novel. The world is destroyed by increasingly powerful winds.
Film	1962	War	La jetée	Chris Marker	
Film	1962	War	Panic in Year Zero!		A 1962 movie about a family that escapes Los Angeles after the city is devastated by a nuclear attack.
Film	1962	War	This Is Not a Test		
Film	1962	Impact Event, Monsters	The Day of the Triffids		Loosely based on the John Wyndham novel of the same name. The film version of the Triffids are poisonous space-borne plants, and arrive on Earth via meteorites.
Novel	1962	Eco	Hothouse	Brian Aldiss	Presents a dying Earth where vegetation dominates and animal life is all but extinct. Originally published in the United States in abridged form as The Long, Hot Afternoon of Earth.
Novel	1962	Eco	The Drowned World	J. G. Ballard	Climate change causes flooding
Novel	1962	Eco	The Wanting Seed	Anthony Burgess	Global overpopulation and famine leads to mass chaos
Novel	1962	Eco	The World in Winter (U.K.)/The Long Winter(U.S.)	John Christopher	A decrease in radiation from the sun causes a new ice age
Novel	1963	War	Triumph	Philip Wylie	
Novel	1963	Future collapse	Space Viking	H. Beam Piper	
Novel	1963	Eco	Cat's Cradle	Kurt Vonnegut	All the water on Earth (including that within living people) is exposed to and becomes ice-nine, a fictional alternative structure of water that is solid at room temperature
Novel	1963	Future collapse	The Dragon Masters	Jack Vance	
Comic	1963	Technology	Magnus, Robot Fighter		Comic book series by Gold Key Comics
Novel	1963	Human decline	Planet of the Apes	Pierre Boulle	
Novel	1963	Unspecified	The Wall	Marlen Haushofer	Adapted to film in 2012 under the same name. A 40-something woman, while vacationing in a hunting lodge in the Austrian mountains, discovers that a transparent wall has been placed that closes her off from the outside world; all life outside the wall appears to have died, possibly in a nuclear event.
Film	1963	Eco	The Birds		Loosely based on the 1952 story of the same name by Daphne du Maurier, it focuses on a series of sudden and unexplained violent bird attacks on the people of Bodega Bay, California, over the course of a few days.
Film	1964	War	Dr. Strangelove or: How I Learned to Stop Worrying and Love the Bomb	Stanley Kubrick	Adaptation of the novel Red Alert by Peter George
Film	1964	Disease	The Last Man on Earth		The first film adaptation based on Richard Matheson's 1954 novel I Am Legend.
Film	1964	War	The Time Travelers		
Novel	1964	Disease	Virus	Sakyo Komatsu	Novel about a lethal super-germ that kills humanity in months; later adapted into a 1980 movie
Film	1964	Eco	Crack in the World		Deep-drilling project goes wrong
Novel	1964	War	Davy	Edgar Pangborn	
Novel	1964	War	Farnham's Freehold	Robert A. Heinlein	
Novel	1964	War	The Penultimate Truth	Philip K. Dick	
Television	1964	Aliens	"The Dalek Invasion of Earth"		A Doctor Who serial; as well as other alien invasions in the 1963–1989 run, including in 1966 "The Tenth Planet", 1968 "The Web of Fear" and in the same year "The Invasion", in 1970 "Spearhead from Space", and in 1971 "Terror of the Autons"; this list is not complete but can be said to represent milestone episodes. Some notable examples from the relaunch are in 2006 "Army of Ghosts"/"Doomsday", and in 2007 "The Sound of Drums"/"Last of the Time Lords" (though it could be argued that only the Master is an alien).
Film	1964	Eco	The Day the Earth Caught Fire		Earth starts hurtling toward the Sun as a result of man's nuclear testing
Novel	1964	Eco	The Drought	J. G. Ballard	A super-drought evaporates all water on Earth
Novel	1964	Eco	Greybeard	Brian Aldiss	The human race becomes sterile
Novel	1964	Eco	Time of the Great Freeze	Robert Silverberg	Another ice age has engulfed Earth. A group from New York travels over the ice to London in the year 2650.
Television	1964–2002	War	The Outer Limits		"Soldier" (cited as an influence on the movie The Terminator); "Bits of Love"; "The Human Factor"; "The Vaccine"
Television	1965	War	The War Game	Peter Watkins	
Novel	1965	War	Dr. Bloodmoney, or How We Got Along After the Bomb	Philip K. Dick	
Game	1965	War	Nuclear War Card Game		Game by Flying Buffalo. A comical cataclysmic card game for 2–6 players of all ages.
Novel	1965	Aliens	The Genocides	Thomas M. Disch	Alien flora is seeded on Earth, and quickly comes to dominate all landmasses, threatening humanity with extinction
Novel	1965	Eco	A Wrinkle in the Skin (The Ragged Edge (U.S.))	John Christopher	Civilization destroyed by massive worldwide earthquakes
Film	1965	Technology	Alphaville, une étrange aventure de Lemmy Caution		
Story	1965	Technology	The Cyberiad	Stanisław Lem	A collection of humorous short stories
Television	1966	War	Ape and Essence		Television adaptation of the novel of the same name
Film	1966	Aliens	Daleks – Invasion Earth 2150 AD		Based loosely on "The Dalek Invasion of Earth", an early serial of the BBC television series Doctor Who, but not part of the official canon
Novel	1966	Eco	The Crystal World	J. G. Ballard	The jungle in Africa starts to crystallize all life and expands outward
Novel	1966	Eco	Make Room! Make Room!	Harry Harrison	Made into the 1973 film Soylent Green directed by Richard Fleischer – showing a world where humanity has become massively overpopulated, a vague ecological disaster is creating a growing dust bowl, and the entire economy is collapsing
Novel	1966, 1974, 1977	Technology	Colossus	Dennis Feltham Jones	Plus two sequels called The Fall of Colossus (1974) and Colossus and the Crab (1977)
Novel series	1967–1988	Aliens	The Tripods	John Christopher	Made into a TV series in the 1980s
Film	1967	War	Late August at the Hotel Ozone; Cz. Konec srpna v Hotelu Ozon		
Film	1967	War	In the Year 2889		A remake of the 1955 Roger Corman film Day the World Ended that is set in the year 1977, despite the title.
Film	1967	War	Journey to the Center of Time		
Novel	1967	War	Ice	Anna Kavan	Earth threatened by a nuclear winter
Story	1967	Technology	"I Have No Mouth, and I Must Scream"	Harlan Ellison	The result of an American supercomputer made for war becoming sentient and going rogue, driving humanity to extinction and leaving only five humans alive to be tortured for eternity by the now-omnipotent supercomputer, christening itself AM. This was later turned into a point-and-click computer game, where AM was voiced by Harlan Ellison himself.
Novel series	1967–2005	Technology	The Berserker series	Fred Saberhagen	
Novel	1968	Technology	Rite of Passage	Alexei Panshin	Earth, after building a dozen or so Ships and seeding a number of colony planets, is destroyed. The Ships are technologically advanced, but the colony planets have all to some extent regressed technologically. The Ships' populations are managed on strictly eugenic lines: as part of this, they deliberately strand their young on colony planets for a month in the Trial, both to weed out bad genes and as a rite of passage.
Film	1968	War	Planet of the Apes		Adapted from the novel La planète des singes by Pierre Boulle
Novel	1968	War	Do Androids Dream of Electric Sheep?	Philip K. Dick	Basis for the film Blade Runner
Novel	1968	Technology	The God Machine	Martin Caidin	
Comic	1968–	War	Cobalt 60	Vaughn Bodé	First published in 1968, the series was revived from 1984–1985 and in 1993.
Novel	1968	Social Collapse	Stand on Zanzibar	John Brunner	Set in a future of extreme over-population. Winner of the Hugo Award, the British Science Fiction award, and the French Prix Apollo.
Novel	1968, 1970	Supernatural	Black Easter	James Blish	A black magician brings about the end of the world by releasing all of the demons from Hell. Followed by a sequel called The Day After Judgment (1970).
Film	1969	War	The Bed Sitting Room		Absurdist comedy film set in a post-war London destroyed by a nuclear bomb in World War III. Originally based on a play by Spike Milligan and John Antrobus.
Television	1969	War	Salve Regina		Four people seek refuge in the basement of a department store following a nuclear explosion
Novel	1969	War	Damnation Alley	Roger Zelazny	Made into a movie and a Hawkwind song in 1977
Novel	1969	War	Heroes and Villains	Angela Carter	
Film	1969	Disease	The Seed of Man; ITA: Il Seme dell'uomo	Marco Ferreri	
Novel	1969	Eco	The Ice Schooner	Michael Moorcock	Set in a new ice age on Earth
Story	1969	War	"A Boy and His Dog"	Harlan Ellison	
Film	1970	War	Beneath the Planet of the Apes		The second film in the Planet of the Apes feature film series.
Novel	1970	War	The Incredible Tide	Alexander Key	
Novel	1970	War	The Last War	Kir Bulychev	In the Russian language
Novel	1970	War	The Year Of The Quiet Sun	Wilson Tucker	
Film	1970	Eco	No Blade of Grass		Based on the novel The Death of Grass
Novel	1970	Future collapse	Ringworld	Larry Niven	An expedition from earth to find a futuristic planet, a ring surrounding a star, results in the members finding that the breakdown of superconductors and the resulting ring-wide power failure caused the cities to break apart and civilization to collapse
Novel	1970	Supernatural, war, eco, human decline	The Late, Great Planet Earth	Carole C. Carlson, Hal Lindsey	Bestselling blockbuster Bible prophecy-based "mockumentary" novel, adapted into a 1979 feature-length theatrical motion picture narrated by Orson Welles
Television	1970	Eco	"Inferno"		A Doctor Who serial in which attempts to tap Earth's core for power leads to a volcanic apocalypse.
Film	1971	War	Glen and Randa		
Film	1971	War	The Omega Man		An immune survivor of a biological/nuclear war battles plague-altered quasi-vampires bent on erasing all vestiges of science and technology. The second film version of Richard Matheson's 1954 novel I Am Legend
Novel	1971	War	Love in the Ruins	Walker Percy	
Novel	1971	War	The Overman Culture	Edmund Cooper	
Television	1971	Eco	Timeslip		1971 TV series Timeslip: The Year of the Burn-Up – terraforming causes global warming
Novel	1971	Eco	Mutant 59: The Plastic Eater	Gerry Davis, Kit Pedler	A microbe designed to eat waste plastic gets loose
Novel series	1971	Technology	The Moderan series	David R. Bunch	
Short Story	1971	Sun	Inconstant Moon	Larry Niven	
Radio	1972	Aliens, disease, zombies	The Peoria Plague		Originally recorded and aired by station WUHN (now WSWT), in Peoria, Illinois
Novel	1972	War	Malevil	Robert Merle	
Novel	1972	War	There Will Be Time	Poul Anderson	
Film	1972	Eco	Silent Running		Directorial debut for Douglas Trumbull. An ecologically minded astronaut struggles to save the last bio-dome preserving what is left of Earth's plant life. Adventures with uncooperative droids and the rings of Saturn ensue.
Novel	1972	Eco	The Sheep Look Up	John Brunner	The United States is overwhelmed by environmental irresponsibility and authoritarianism
Novel	1972	Eco	The End of the Dream	Philip Wylie	
Film	1972	Supernatural	A Thief in the Night		The evangelical Christian film series, sometimes referred to as the Mark IV films.
Film	1972	War	Doomsday Machine		In 1975, a crew of space travelers tries to colonize Venus after Earth is destroyed by a "doomsday device". Originally filmed in 1967, but (due to money problems) not finished and/or released until five years later. Directed by Herbert J. Leder, Lee Sholem, and producer Harry Hope.
Comic	1972–	War	Kamandi, the Last Boy on Earth	Jack Kirby	
Film	1973	War	Battle for the Planet of the Apes		The fifth movie in the Planet of the Apes feature film series.
Film	1973	War	Genesis II	Gene Roddenberry	Later remade as the unsuccessful TV pilot Planet Earth
Film	1973	War	Refuge of Fear; SPA: El refugio del miedo		
Film	1973	Eco	Idaho Transfer		Directed by Peter Fonda. A research team discover a way to travel into the future, and in doing so discover that a worldwide ecological catastrophe is imminent. They send a group of earnest teenagers forward in time to repopulate the Earth after the disaster – but it does not end well.
Novel	1973, 1976	Eco	Children of Morrow and Treasures of Morrow	H. M. Hoover	Set in California several centuries after pollution has all but wiped out the human race; published in 1973 and 1976, respectively
Story	1973	Eco	Flight of the Horse	Larry Niven	Collection of short stories
Comic	1973	Eco	Violence Jack	Go Nagai	A manga series that tells the tale of a Japan devastated by a massive earthquake and mass volcanic eruption and isolated from the rest of the world, with the remnants of humanity divided between the strong and the weak. A sequel to Nagai's Devilman manga series.
Story	1973	Technology	"Trucks"	Stephen King	An unknown phenomenon makes Earth's machines turn against humanity. It was later made into the movie Maximum Overdrive, which added an alien invasion subplot.
Novel	1973	Human decline	The Camp of the Saints	Jean Raspail	
Television	1973	Unspecified	The Starlost	Harlan Ellison	A Canadian-produced science fiction television series broadcast on CTV in Canada and on NBC in the United States.
Television	1973–1974	Technology	Casshan		
Film	1974	War	The Third Cry; Fr. Le Troisième Cri		Swiss film.
Novel	1974	Future collapse	The Mote in God's Eye	Larry Niven, Jerry Pournelle	Mankind's growing interstellar empire discovers an old and sophisticated alien society restricted for millions of years to a single planet. Their hopes for a peaceful coexistence are shattered when they discover how the aliens control their population.
Television	1974	War	Planet Earth		Unsuccessful TV pilot remake of Genesis II
Television	1974	War	Planet of the Apes		TV series
Film	1974	Disease	Where Have All The People Gone?		Made for TV movie. A mutated virus created by a solar flare destroys virtually all of the human population. One family has survived, and endeavors to travel across America to their family home.
Film	1974	Eco	Prophecies of Nostradamus		
Film	1974	Human decline	Zardoz	John Boorman	
Novel	1974	Disease	The Last Canadian	William C. Heine	The planet is decimated by a virus, as told through the eyes of one survivor
Film	1978	Zombies	Dawn of the Dead		Survivors barricade themselves in a suburban mall amid a zombie apocalypse
Novel	1974, 1979, 1984, 1993	Monsters	The Rats series – The Rats (1974), Lair (1979), Domain (1984) and The City (1993; a graphic novel)	James Herbert	– Domain (1984) and The City (1993), the last two books of the series, show how, after a nuclear war, humanity is overthrown by mutated giant black rats.
Film	1975	War	A Boy and His Dog		A young man (Don Johnson) and his dog (Tiger, the dog actor) struggle for survival and encounter strife in a harsh, post-apocalyptic wasteland where food, water, and women are scarce. Based on the writings of Harlan Ellison.
Film	1975	War	Black Moon		Surreal French production.
Film	1975	War	La città dell'ultima paura		
Film	1975	War	The Noah	Daniel Bourla	An American soldier becomes the sole survivor of a nuclear war
Television	1975	War	"Day of the Daleks"		A Doctor Who serial that also features alien invasion. Guerrillas from the future explain that they are attempting to kill someone because he caused an explosion at a peace conference, starting a series of wars that left humanity vulnerable to conquest by the Daleks.
Television	1975	War	Return to the Planet of the Apes		Animated TV series
Television	1975	War	Strange New World		Another unsuccessful TV pilot remake of Genesis II and Planet Earth
Television	1975–1977	Eco (nuclear waste explosion on the Moon, followed by earthquakes, tsunamis, floods, etc. on Earth, caused by the loss of the Moon)	Space: 1999	Gerry Anderson, Sylvia Anderson	
Novel	1975	War	Caravan	Stephen Goldin	
Novel series	1975	War	The Horseclans series	Robert Adams	Seventeen-book series. First book The Coming of the Horseclans (1975)
Novel	1975	War	Z for Zachariah	Robert C. O'Brien	
Film	1975	Disease	The Ultimate Warrior		
Novel	1975	Disease	The Girl Who Owned a City	O.T. Nelson	Everyone over the age of twelve dies from a virus, leaving the unaffected children to fend for themselves.
Film	1975	Eco	Logan's Run		Society is chased into domes by an ecological disaster, and holds a ceremonial death ritual for all citizens who reach the age of 30 to control the population. A man who formerly helped control the population flees the domed city to avoid his own ceremony.
Novel	1975	Unspecified	Dhalgren	Samuel R. Delany	
Television	1975–1977	Disease	Survivors		BBC series about the daily struggles of British survivors of a plague which kills most of the world population
Film	1976	War	The People Who Own the Dark; Sp. Último deseo	Amando de Ossorio	
Novel	1976	War	Deus Irae	Philip K. Dick, Roger Zelazny	Collaboration.
Novel	1976	Eco	The HAB Theory	Allan W. Eckert	The stability of Earth comes into question
Novel	1976	War	Where Late the Sweet Birds Sang	Kate Wilhelm	After a nuclear war starts, a prepared family escapes into their post-holocaust citadel, and over generations turns to cloning to continue the human race.
Novel	1976	Eco	The Winter of the World	Poul Anderson	Civilization and a new species has emerged from a deadly ice age that has destroyed all previous life
Novel	1976	Sun	A World Out of Time	Larry Niven	
Television series	1976–1979	Eco	Ark II		Pollution devastates humanity
Novel	1977	Unspecified	Eumeswil	Ernst Jünger	The story is set in an undatable post-apocalyptic world, somewhere in present-day Morocco
Film	1977	War	Damnation Alley		A surviving American ICBM crew sets out across the U.S. in an armored vehicle in search of survivors in Albany, New York – based on the novel by Roger Zelazny
Film	1977	War	Wizards	Ralph Bakshi	A good wizard and his evil brother battle some two millennia after Armageddon
Novel	1977	Impact Event	Lucifer's Hammer	Larry Niven, Jerry Pournelle	A comet impact
Novel series	1977–	War	The Shannara series	Terry Brooks	
Film	1977	Eco, supernatural	Holocaust 2000		Directed by Alberto De Martino.
Comic	1977	War	Judge Dredd	Carlos Ezquerra, Pat Mills, John Wagner	
Novel	1977	Disease	Empty World	John Christopher	A virus wipes out the weak and the old, until the planet is populated by young teenagers only
Story	1977	Disease	"Night Surf"	Stephen King	Collected in the book Night Shift.
Story	1977	Eco	"The Screwfly Solution"	Alice Sheldon (better known as James Tiptree Jr) writing as Raccoona Sheldon	Short story; tells the tale of a virus which turns males into female-hating psychopaths when sexually aroused
Television	1977	Eco	Logan's Run (TV series)		Logan's Run is an American science fiction television series, a spin-off from the 1976 film of the same name.
Story	1977	Aliens	The Last Dog	Mike Resnick	
Comic	1977–1996	Technology	Galaxy Express 999		Manga series
Television	1978–1980, 2003, 2004–2009	Aliens, Technology	Battlestar Galactica		A race of (alien-built (1978–80)/man-made (2003–09)) machine beings launch a devastating final assault upon the humans' original homeworlds, and chase a ragtag fleet of survivors, who are in search of a mythical planet called Earth.
Film	1978	War	Deathsport		
Television	1978	War	Future Boy Conan	Hayao Miyazaki	An anime series where supermagnetic WMDs devastate Earth and cause virtually all land to be submerged underwater.
Novel	1978	Disease	The Stand		Stephen King
Film	1978	Aliens	Invasion of the Body Snatchers		Another film based on the novel The Body Snatchers by Jack Finney
Novel	1978	Unspecified	False Dawn	Chelsea Quinn Yarbro	Two humans search for a way to survive in a toxic wasteland. Republished in 2001.
Game	1978–2010	War	Gamma World		Game from TSR, Inc., the makers of Dungeons & Dragons
Film	1979	War	Ravagers		
Film	1979	Disease	Plague		Also known as Induced Syndrome (U.K.), M-3: The Gemini Strain (U.S.), or Mutation.
Television	1979	War	Buck Rogers In The 25th Century		Mostly futuristic in appearance, but outside of the gleaming Utopian city lies apocalyptic ruins swarming with mutants.
Novel	1979	War	Down to a Sunless Sea	David Graham	
Novel series	1979–1982	Future collapse	Last Legionary	Douglas Hill	A lone soldier fights to bring down the organization which unleashed a deadly radiation against his planet, killing all his people and rendering the planet uninhabitable
Film	1979	Impact Event	Meteor		
Song	1979	War	"Your Attention Please"	Scars	Post-punk song adaptation of the 1961 Porter poem of the same name
Film	1979	Eco	Quintet		
Film	1979	Human decline	Mad Max		Australian movie; depicts a declining civilization through the eyes of the titular character who seeks revenge. Starring Mel Gibson.
Novel	1979	Unspecified	Engine Summer	John Crowley	Civilization transformed several millennia past an unspecified collapse of civilization
Novel	1979–1992	Aliens	The Hitchhiker's Guide to the Galaxy	Douglas Adams	
Game book series	1979–1998	Technology	Choose Your Own Adventure	Edward Packard	
Novel	1980	War	The Fifth Horseman	Larry Collins, Dominique Lapierre	
Novel	1980	War	Riddley Walker	Russell Hoban	
Novel	1980	War	This Time of Darkness	H.M. Hoover	
Song	1980	Technology	"The Eighth Day"	Hazel O'Connor	Hit single
Film	1980	Disease	Fukkatsu no hi		Japanese film also known as Virus, directed by Kinji Fukasaku. Based on the 1964 book.
Novel	1980	Aliens	Battlefield Earth	L. Ron Hubbard	
Game	1980	War	NukeWar		A turn-based strategy game from Avalon Hill for the Apple II, Commodore 64, Atari 8-bit, and other home computers
Novella	1980	Aliens	"The Mist"	Stephen King	
Novel	1980	Aliens	The Visitors	Clifford D. Simak	
Game	1980	War+	Missile Command	Dave Theurer	Arcade video game designed by Theurer and developed by Atari, Inc. Later ported to many different home computing and gaming platforms for many years afterward. Considered one of the most notable classic video games of all time.
Novel series	1980–1983	Human decline	The Book of the New Sun	Gene Wolfe	
Novel	1980	Sun	The Shadow of the Torturer	Gene Wolfe	Followed by The Claw of the Conciliator (1981), The Sword of the Lictor (1981), The Citadel of the Autarch (1982), and The Urth of the New Sun (1987).
Television	1980–1982	Impact Event	Thundarr the Barbarian		Events 2,000 years after the disaster of 1994
Game	1980–1983	War	The Morrow Project		Game from Timeline Ltd.
Film	1981	War	Mad Max 2		The second installment in the Mad Max series, known as The Road Warrior in the U.S. This movie follows the titular character as he interacts with a community based around a small oil refinery and a group of marauding bandits. Starring Mel Gibson.
Film	1981	War	Malevil		Film version directed by Christian de Chalonge. Starring Michel Serrault, Jacques Dutronc and Jean-Louis Trintignant
Novel series	1981	War	The Survivalist series	Jerry Ahern	First book 1981, Total War
Game	1981	War	Aftermath!		Game from Fantasy Games Unlimited
Novel series	1981	War	The Pelbar Cycle	Paul O. Williams	Seven-book series. First book The Breaking of Northwall (1981); a thousand years after a series of nuclear exchanges. Re-published in 2005.
Novel	1981	Eco	The Quiet Earth	Craig Harrison	Adapted into the 1985 movie of the same name.
Television	1981	Impact Event, Monsters, Disease	The Day of the Triffids		1981 TV adaptation of The Day of the Triffids by John Wyndham
Novel	1981	Technology	Robot Revolt	Nicholas Fisk	
Comic	1981	Technology	Uncanny X-Men	John Byrne, Chris Claremont	"Days of Future Past" story arc
Film	1982	War	Battletruck		Set in New Zealand, survivors of nuclear war (known as the Oil Wars) attempt to rebuild society while fending off the ambitions of a militaristic despot who has based himself in a mobile armored vehicle.
Film	1982	War	2020 Texas Gladiators		Post-apocalyptic Italian film
Film	1982	War	The Aftermath		Returning astronauts encounter bikers and mutants in a post-nuclear setting. Released as Zombie Aftermath in the U.K.
Novel	1982	Human decline	Friday	Robert A. Heinlein	Human society on a future Earth is slipping into a gradual, but inevitable, collapse
Novel	1982–	Human decline	The Dark Tower series	Stephen King	First book published in 1982
Comic	1982–1990	War	Akira	Katsuhiro Otomo	Cyberpunk manga series published by Dark Horse Comics – about a group of young bikers in a post-apocalyptic Tokyo who clash with the government and psychics with incredible power. Adapted into a 1988 animated movie
Film	1982	War	Human Highway		
Television	1982	War	World War III		Originally broadcast on the NBC television network. The film's original director, Boris Sagal, died in a freak mishap during filming, and was replaced by his successor, David Greene. The teleplay was written by Robert L. Joseph.
Film	1982	War	She		A low-budget B-movie and an extremely loose adaptation of the novel She by H. Rider Haggard, starring Sandahl Bergman as a post-civilization warrior.
Film	1982	War	Warriors of the Wasteland		After a nuclear war, humanity is reduced to starving tribes with roving gangs seeking to take what they can by force.
Television	1982	War	Whoops Apocalypse		
Novel	1982	Disease	The White Plague	Frank Herbert	
Game	1982	Technology	Robotron: 2084		Created by Williams
Television	1982–1983	Aliens	The Super Dimension Fortress Macross		The anime series and its sequels (rewritten and combined with The Super Dimension Cavalry Southern Cross and Genesis Climber Mospeada to create Robotech, which dealt similarly with post-apocalyptic themes).
Film	1983	War	2019, After the Fall of New York		An Italian film set in 2019 featuring a mercenary out to rescue the last fertile woman on Earth.
Film	1983	War	Endgame		
Film	1983	War	Exterminators of the Year 3000		
Film	1983	War	Le Dernier Combat		Luc Besson
Film	1983	War	Stryker		
Film	1983	War	Testament		
Film	1983	War	Warrior of the Lost World		A wanderer on a super-sonic motorcycle becomes the savior of a society of misfits.
Film	1983	War	Yor, the Hunter from the Future		
Television	1983	War	The Day After		The effects of nuclear war on a Kansas town
Novel	1983	War	The Amtrak Wars	Patrick Tilley	Series, set at the end of the 3rd millennium
Novel series	1983	War	The Ashes series	William W. Johnstone	First book 1983, Out of the Ashes
Comic	1983–1988	War	Fist of the North Star	Buronson, Tetsuo Hara	Influential shonen manga series featuring a warrior trained in a powerful martial arts style rights wrongs and battles evil warlords in a post-apocalyptic world. Inspired the landmark anime series, a live-action film, and many games.
Novel	1983	War	Hiero's Journey	Sterling E. Lanier	Plus a sequel calledThe Unforsaken Hiero (1985); a "metis" priest/killman quests across post-apocalyptic northeastern North America, 7,000 years in the future
Novel	1983	War	The Last Children of Schewenborn; Die Letzten Kinder Von Schewenborn	Gudrun Pausewang	
Novel	1983	War	Pulling Through	Dean Ing	
Novel	1983	War	Trinity's Child	William Prochnau	
Novel series	1983	War	Vampire Hunter D	Hideyuki Kikuchi	First book 1983, novels (and later anime movies), set 10,000 years after a nuclear war occurs in 1999
Television	1983–1984	Aliens	Genesis Climber Mospeada		Anime series (see also Robotech)
Television series	1983–1985	Aliens	V		
Film	1984	War	Dark Enemy		
Comic	1984–1995	Technology	Dragon Ball		In the Cell saga of Dragon Ball Z, a time traveler arrives from a post-apocalyptic future where two powerful killer androids have destroyed much of the world, and attempts to stop the same thing from happening in the main timeline.
Story	1984	War	"Extinction is Forever"	Louise Lawrence	A scientist uses a time machine to travel to the future and film the results of a nuclear war in a bid to prevent it from happening. However, his actions could have serious repercussions for the mutated descendants of the human race.
Film	1984	War	Radioactive Dreams		After an atomic war, Phillip Hammer and Marlowe Chandler have spent 15 years on their own in a bunker, then they find the keys to the last MX missile.
Film	1984	War	Sexmission		A Polish comedy. All men, except two who were hibernating, die after a war with the use of an M-bomb that kills only males.
Television	1984	War	Threads		BBC television docudrama
Television	1984	War	Z for Zachariah		BBC made-for-TV film adaptation of the 1975 novel of the same name
Novel	1984	War	The Beast of Heaven	Victor Kelleher	A group of wanderers is scavenging a deserted landscape while two AI wardens are rowing about the last bomb.
Novel	1984	War	Brother in the Land	Robert Swindells	
Novel	1984	War	Doomsday Plus Twelve	James D. Forman	
Novel	1984	War	Emergence	David R. Palmer	
Novel series	1984	War	The Traveler series	D. B. Drumm	First book First, You Fight (1984)
Novel	1984	War	Warday	James Kunetka, Whitley Strieber	
Novel	1984	Disease	Clay's Ark	Octavia Butler	
Film	1984	Impact Event	Night of the Comet		When a comet passes too close to Earth, two girls are left amid mutants.
Television	1984	War	Countdown to Looking Glass		Canadian-produced TV movie, directed by producer Fred Barzyk, and originally premiering in the United States, on the HBO pay-cable TV network
Film	1984	Eco	Nausicaä of the Valley of the Wind	Hayao Miyazaki	Based on the manga of the same name
Novel	1984	Eco	In the Drift	Michael Swanwick	Also an alternate history story – the 1979 Three Mile Island reactor incident resulted in a very large release of radioactivity, devastating the northeastern U.S.
Television	1984–1985	Aliens	The Tripods		An adaptation of the first two books in the trilogy by John Christopher
Television	1984–1987	War	Fist of the North Star		Landmark post-apocalyptic anime series based on the manga of the same name.
Game	1984–1993	War	Twilight: 2000		Game from Game Designer's Workshop – set in a world where a Sino-Russian war degenerates into a limited nuclear conflict that eventually drags in Europe and America
Film	1984–2009	Technology	The Terminator franchise		Series of films dealing with a future devastated by a war between humans and machines, the attempt of the machines to kill the hero of the human resistance in the past, and the attempt of the hero and others to prevent this future from ever coming to pass
Film	1985	Zombies	Day of the Dead		A handful of soldiers and scientists holed up in an underground bunker try to survive and understand the zombies outside the gates. Final chapter of Romero's trilogy.
Film	1985	War	Def-Con 4		
Film	1985	War	Mad Max Beyond Thunderdome		The third installment in the Mad Max series. This film follows the titular character as he interacts with the post-apocalyptic community of Bartertown. Starring Mel Gibson.
Film	1985	War	Warriors of the Apocalypse		After civilization is wiped out by nuclear war, an adventurer leads a group of wanderers on a search for the fabled Mountain of Life.
Novel	1985	War	Children of the Dust	Louise Lawrence	
Novel	1985	War	Fiskadoro	Denis Johnson	
Novel	1985	War	Freeway Fighter	Ian Livingstone	Part of the "Fighting Fantasy" Gamebook series (like the Choose Your Own Adventure series)
Novel	1985	Human decline	Galápagos	Kurt Vonnegut	After an ambiguous eradication of the human species, several people on a cruise to the Galápagos Islands get stranded there. Much to the dismay of the only male left, the women of the island continue the human species for thousands of years, where they evolve into seal-like creatures.
Comic	1985–1989	War	Appleseed	Masamune Shirow	Japanese manga (and subsequent anime adaptations)
Novel	1985	War	The Postman	David Brin	A novel set in Oregon after the apocalypse. Serves as a basis for the 1997 movie of the same name.
Novel	1985	War	The Steel, the Mist and the Blazing Sun	Christopher Anvil	
Novel	1985	War	This Is the Way the World Ends	James Morrow	
Film	1985	Disease	City Limits		
Novel	1985	Disease	Blood Music	Greg Bear	
Novel	1985	Disease	The Fourth Horseman	Alan E. Nourse	Follows the progression of a new outbreak of the Black Death and the struggle to survive as society collapses
Novel	1985	Aliens	Footfall	Larry Niven, Jerry Pournelle	Baby elephant-like invaders hurl asteroids at Earth; the humans revolt
Novel	1985	Eco	The Handmaid's Tale	Margaret Atwood	Dystopia is fueled by rampant infertility caused by pollution
Film	1985	Technology	Starchaser: The Legend of Orin		
Novel	1985	Technology	The Adolescence of P-1	Thomas J. Ryan	
Game	1985	Technology	The Mechanoid Invasion		Gamebook and its source books, supplements and sequels; was the first role-playing game from Palladium Books, conceived and written by Kevin Siembieda
Film	1985	Sun	The Quiet Earth		Based on the 1981 novel The Quiet Earth by Craig Harrison
Film	1986	War	America 3000		In Colorado, 900 years after a nuclear war in the U.S., humanity is sent back to the Stone Age.
Film	1986	War	Fist of the North Star		Animated Japanese film based on the manga of the same name.
Film	1986	War	Robot Holocaust		
Film	1986	War	The Sacrifice		
Film	1986	War	When the Wind Blows	Jimmy Murakami	Adapting the graphic novel by Raymond Briggs
Film	1986	War	Whoops Apocalypse		
Novel series	1986–	War	The Deathlands series	James Axler	
Novel series	1986	War	The Endworld series	David L. Robbins	First book 1986
Film	1986	Disease	Dead Man's Letters	Konstantin Lopushanskij	
Story	1986	Aliens	Maximum Overdrive	Stephen King	Aliens remotely control machines (trucks, cars and even vending machines) to kill the human population before invading. Based on the Stephen King short story "Trucks".
Novel	1986	Uncertain	Marooned in Realtime	Vernor Vinge	Post-apocalyptical novel where characters bypass the Technological singularity by enclosing themselves inside impenetrable stasis fields called "bobbles" which drastically slow the passage of time for those living inside them.
Novel	1986	Sun	Songs of Distant Earth	Arthur C. Clarke	In which the last survivors of Earth arrive at a distant colony unexpectedly
Comic	1986–1993	War	Ex-Mutants		Set in a post-nuclear world
Film	1986	Eco	Solarbabies		Also known as Solarwarriors
Novel	1986	Eco	Nature's End	James Kunetka, Whitley Strieber	
Story	1986	Eco	"The End of the Whole Mess"	Stephen King	A distillate of a Texas aquifer, originally harvested and distributed worldwide to reduce human propensity for violence, curses humanity with premature Alzheimer's disease and senility
Manga	1986–1989	Aliens	Outlanders	Johji Manabe	
Game	1986–2003	Future collapse, aliens	Might and Magic series original universe	Jon van Caneghem	The games are set in colonies of the Ancients, an advanced space-faring race, several thousand years after all contact with the Ancients was lost due to them being engaged in interstellar war with an alien race called the Kreegan. This event, called the Silence, caused the colonies to regress into a medieval state and consider Ancients and their technology as mythical in nature.
Film	1987	War	Cherry 2000		
Novel	1987	War	The King Awakes	Janice Elliott	King Arthur awakens in post-nuclear Britain.
Film	1987	War	Creepozoids		
Film	1987	War	Death Run		
Film	1987	War	Hell Comes to Frogtown		
Film	1987	War	Interzone		
Film	1987	War	Steel Dawn		
Film	1987	War	The Survivalist		The Soviet Union blames the U.S. for a nuclear explosion, and in the ensuing chaos, the protagonist must defend his family. Based on the Jerry Ahern pulp novel series.
Film	1987	War	Survivor		
Film	1987	War	Urban Warriors		Three technicians working in an underground laboratory discover that a nuclear war has destroyed most of the aboveground world.
Television	1987	War	Knights of God		
Novel	1987	War	Fire Brats	Scott Siegel	First book 1987, co-authored with Barbera Siegel, grades 8–10
Novel series	1987	War	Obernewtyn Chronicles	Isobelle Carmody	First book 1987
Novel	1987	War	Swan Song		Robert R. McCammon
Game	1987	War	Crystalis		Game from SNK
Game	1987–	War (interstellar), Aliens (ancient civilizations), Disease (Mutations), Technology (Use of Artificial Intelligence), Supernatural (Daemons and Sorcery), Future collapse (Isolation of colonized planets), Social collapse (Return of medieval superstitions), Human decline (Negligence of fundamental human rights)	Warhammer 40,000		The Eldar, a technologically advanced race who dominated the galaxy until the 29th millennium and was superior to the nascent human race, falls into moral decadence, causing the disfigurement of reality to numerous star systems colonized by the people of Earth fueled by the negative emotions of countless sentiment species brought into instability and unending conflict for survival. At the same time, the majority of humanity's population degrade to a pre-industrial society because of the loss of technology due to a massive confrontation with artificially intelligent machines over thousands of years, until an Empire forcefully unites most humans under a fascist totalitarian theocratic regime that conducted an unending war for the genocide of every other advanced lifeform.
Novel	1987	Aliens	The Forge of God	Greg Bear	
Novel	1987	Eco	Wolf In Shadow	David Gemmell	The world is devastated by huge tsunamis. Most of the technology left in the world is on par with the mid- to late 1800s, but there are some newer weapons around.
Novel	1987–	Unspecified	Wraeththu	Storm Constantine	A series of novels set in a world where humanity is replaced as the planet's dominant species by a race of mystic hermaphrodites. War and plague ravage the human population, but no single cause is specified.
Song	1987	Technology	"Twilight of The Gods"	Helloween	
Novel	1987	Unspecified	In the Country of Last Things	Paul Auster	
Television	1987–1988	Technology	Captain Power and the Soldiers of the Future		After a war against the machines in which the humans lost, a small group of resistance fighters must keep humanity alive against the evil forces of Lord Dread.
Film	1988	War	Akira		Groundbreaking anime film based on the manga of the same name
Film	1988	War	Miracle Mile		
Film	1988	War	She-Wolves of the Wasteland		
Television	1988–1999; 2009–	Future collapse	Red Dwarf		British science-fiction sitcom; first ran between 1988 and 1999 and was restarted in 2009
Film	1988	War	World Gone Wild		
Novel series	1988	War	Freeway Warrior	Joe Dever	First book 1988
Novel	1988	War	The Gate to Women's Country	Sheri S. Tepper	
Novel	1988	War	The Last Ship	William Brinkley	
Novel	1988	War	Time Capsule	Mitch Berman	
Film	1988	Aliens	They Live		Part science fiction thriller and part black comedy
Game	1988	Aliens	Manhunter		A computer game set in an alternate timeline where Earth's population is enslaved by an alien species known as the Orbs
Game	1988	Technology	Wasteland		Post-apocalyptic RPG, main story features a rogue AI that not only caused a nuclear war between the United States and Soviet Union, but also is attempting to eradicate any humans that survived
Novel	1988	Human decline	At Winter's End	Robert Silverberg	
Game	1988	Social Collapse	Dark Future		Miniature wargame by Games Workshop – a role-playing game franchise composed of the game and associated novels and short-story anthologies set within the Dark Future universe
Novel	1988	Unspecified	Tea from an Empty Cup	Pat Cadigan	A novel set in a cyberpunk world following a vaguely described natural cataclysm
Television	1988–1990	Aliens	War of the Worlds: The Second Invasion		The second season of this television spin-off from the 1953 movie was set after a successful alien invasion.
Film	1989	War	The Blood of Heroes	David Webb Peoples	Australian film written and directed by Peoples
Film	1989	Zombies	The Dead Next Door		Low-budget, Sam Raimi produced, zombie apocalypse film.
Film	1989	War	Cyborg		
Film	1989	War	Empire of Ash II		
Film	1989	War	Empire of Ash III		
Novella	1989	Zombies	On the Far Side of the Cadillac Desert With Dead Folks	Joe R. Lansdale	
Novella	1989	War	Folk of the Fringe	Orson Scott Card	Novella "West", plus several short stories
Game	1989	War	Badlands		A racing game by Atari Games set in the aftermath of nuclear war with races taking place in the wastelands left over from the war.
Novel	1989	Disease	Plague 99	Jean Ure	Sequels Come Lucky April and Watchers at the Shrine
Film	1989	Eco	Millennium		
Film	1989	Eco	Slipstream		
Novel	1989	Eco	Stark		Ben Elton
Film	1989	Technology	Gunhed		
Film	1989	Technology	Moontrap		
Novel	1989	Monsters	Moonbane	Al Sarrantonio	About a worldwide uprising of werewolves
Novel	1989	Supernatural	The Dead	Mark E. Rogers	Combines themes of the Rapture and zombies
Story	1989	Disease	"On the Far Side of the Cadillac Desert with Dead Folks"	Joe R. Lansdale	Bacteria causes the dead to rise. A bounty hunter chases his quarry and encounters an evil cult.
Film	1989	Eco	A Visitor to a Museum	Konstantin Lopushansky	In a post-apocalyptic world, the population is divided and decimated. In the depths of the sea exists "the Museum", which can only be reached during occasional periods of low tide when the sea becomes a barren desert.
Film	1990	War	The Handmaid's Tale		
Novel	1990–1994	Fantasy	The Death Gate Cycle		Series of books which take place after the world has been unmade and remade by magic
Novel	1990–2013	Supernatural, war	The Wheel of Time series	Robert Jordan	An attempt by Aes Sedai researchers to tap into a newly discovered source of magic more advanced than the One Power leads to an experiment to bore a hole in the Pattern. It goes awry when it is discovered that the Bore leads to the Dark One's prison, allowing the Dark One to influence the world. This causes the male half of the One Power to be tainted, driving all male Aes Sedai mad and causing the Breaking of the World. The society regresses from futuristic to Renaissance-era, with only a few artifacts of the Age of Legends remaining.
Film	1990	War	Hardware		
Film	1990	War	Robot Jox		
Television	1990	War	The Girl from Tomorrow		Australian children's drama in which a girl from the 31st century (after the Northern Hemisphere has been destroyed in the Great Disaster, later revealed to be a nuclear holocaust) becomes stranded in the 20th century. In the sequel, The Girl from Tomorrow Part II: Tomorrow's End (1993), she and her friends fight to prevent history from being changed in such a way that the Southern Hemisphere is destroyed as well.
Comic	1990–1991	War	The Last American		Series originally from Marvel in 1990/1991, re-released by Com.X
Novel	1990	War	Nightfall	Isaac Asimov, Robert Silverberg	Extension written by Silverberg of the Asimov story of the same name
Game	1990	War	Mad Max		A single-player NES game based on the movie Mad Max 2.
Manga	1990–1995	War	Battle Angel Alita	Yukito Kishiro	Manga series containing post-apocalyptic elements and taking place in a highly futuristic dystopian world
Game	1990	War	Rifts		A nuclear exchange triggers the return of Ley Lines and Interdimensional Rifts or portals. These Ley Lines and Portals subsequently cause several natural and supernatural disasters.
Film	1990	Disease	A Wind Named Amnesia		A mysterious plague has swept over the entire world, causing everyone to suffer from amnesia, leading to the collapse of civilization. Based on a novel by Hideyuki Kikuchi.
Television	1990	Disease	Not with a Bang		ITV show, about three people who lived after everyone else in England was turned to dust by a chemical that was accidentally released by a television presenter
Novel	1990	Disease	The City, Not Long After	Pat Murphy	In the wake of a devastating worldwide plague, a handful of artists transform the city of San Francisco, and fend off marauders with a touch of magic
Novel	1990	Disease	A Gift Upon the Shore	M. K. Wren	
Novel	1990	Divine prophecy	Good Omens	Neil Gaiman, Terry Pratchett	
Film	1990	Aliens	I Come in Peace		Also known as Dark Angel, directed by Craig R. Baxley
Novel	1990	Aliens	The Madness Season	Celia S. Friedman	
Film	1990	Eco	Mindwarp		Taking place in the year 2037, the loss of the ozone layer has left most of the planet a desolate wasteland scattered with highly radioactive Death Zones.
Film	1990	Eco	Omega Cop		After an environmental holocaust, a lone cop battles a gang of rampaging marauders.
Novel	1990	Social Collapse	Wolf and Iron	Gordon R. Dickson	A man and a wolf band together to survive in an America devastated by financial collapse
Television	1990–1991	Technology	Bucky O'Hare and the Toad Wars		
Television	1990–1992	Eco	Captain Planet		The Captain Planet two-part episode "Two Futures", in which the character Wheeler gets a glimpse of what could happen if damage to the environment was allowed to continue unchecked
Novel	1990–1994	War	Gan Moondark	Donald E. McQuinn	Trilogy Warrior, Wanderer, and Witch, set in the Pacific Northwest, generations after World War III
Film	1991	War	Delicatessen	Marc Caro, Jean-Pierre Jeunet	
Novel	1991	War	Yellow Peril	Wang Lixiong (pseudonym Bao Mi)	Tn the Chinese. About a nuclear civil war in the People's Republic of China
Game	1991	War	Armour-Geddon		Game from Psygnosis
Novel	1991	Eco	Fallen Angels	Michael Flynn, Larry Niven, Jerry Pournelle	Space-based civilization exists despite the government's wishes during an ice age
Game	1991	Eco	Dark Sun		A Dungeons & Dragons campaign setting by TSR, Inc. – focusing on a world that has been turned into an inhospitable desert by overuse of magic that destroyed the surrounding vegetation
Novel	1991–1995	Future collapse	The General series	David Drake, S. M. Stirling	
Film	1991	Supernatural	The Rapture		
Television	1992	War	woops!		Short-lived sitcom about the survivors of a nuclear war
Game	1992	War	Outlander		A Mad Max-inspired driving game from 1992/93 for Snes and Genesis
Novel	1992	Disease	The Children of Men	P. D. James	
Film	1992	Technology	American Cyborg: Steel Warrior		A film following the one woman who is able to conceive life after a third world war leaves the world's population sterile.
Novel	1992	Monsters	Skeletons	Al Sarrantonio	The galaxy passes through a 'cloud' in space, which causes all previously expired creatures on Earth to return to life as bloodthirsty skeletons shrouded in ghostly mirages of their former selves
Game	1992	Aliens	Galactix		Backstory (featuring a satirical fake TV news story regarding the final depletion of the Amazon rain forest) and game play take place in (a fictional version of) the year 2019, in which a powerful alien attack force threatens to obliterate the Earth. Developed by Scott Host, for Cygnus Games (now Mountain King Studios).
Manga	1992–	War	X/1999	Clamp	
Game	1992	Sun, aliens	Epic and its 1994 sequel Inferno		Published by Ocean Software (now Atari). A Battlestar Galactica-esque 3D space shooter video game for MS-DOS and other contemporary (at that time) personal computing platforms.
Song	1992	War	"April 2031"		Song by the band Warrant on their album Dog Eat Dog; depicts an Earth devastated by war where life lives on only by artificial means
Film	1993	War	Cyborg 2		
Film	1993	Eco	Demolition Man		
Film	1993	War	Robot Wars		Sequel to Robot Jox
Novel	1993	Disease	Doomsday Book	Connie Willis	
Film	1993	Aliens	Body Snatchers		Another film based on the novel The Body Snatchers by Jack Finney
Game	1993	Aliens	X-COM: UFO Defense and subsequent follow-ups		The computer game.
Novel	1993	Eco, Social Collapse	Parable of the Sower	Octavia E. Butler	
Film	1993	Eco	The Last Border – Viimeisellä Rajalla		One man's quest for revenge in a world where toxic waste has driven the remains of civilization into the Arctic Circle.
Novel	1993	Eco	The Fifth Sacred Thing	Starhawk	
Novel	1993	Eco	Deus X	Norman Spinrad	The results of global warming
Novel	1993	Eco	This Other Eden	Ben Elton	The Earth's population is forced to live in Biodomes for 50 years while the environment recovers from humanity's actions
Game	1993	Eco	Secret of Mana		Takes place long after a time of environmental collapse that destroyed the world's older advanced civilizations
Novel	1993	Technology	Computer One	Warwick Collins	
Novel	1993	Technology	The Metamorphosis of Prime Intellect	Roger Williams	
Game	1993	Technology	RayForce		Multia Japanese scrolling shooter arcade game
Television	1993	Monsters	Cadillacs and Dinosaurs		Animated TV series in which dinosaurs reclaim Earth. Based on the comic book series Xenozoic Tales.
Game	1993–present	Technology	The Mega Man X series		A video game series created by Capcom
Game	1993–present	Supernatural	The Doom series		A computer game series created by id Software – about a demonic invasion of human colonies on the moons of Mars. The sequel to the original game, Doom II: Hell on Earth, sees the demons invading Earth itself.
Television	1994	War	Knight Rider 2010		Made for TV movie that was designed to be a pilot for a post-apocalyptic spin-off from the original Knight Rider TV series
Novel series	1994–2001	Eco	The Greatwinter trilogy	Sean McMullen	Trilogy comprising Souls in the Great Machine, The Miocene Arrow, and Eyes of the Calculator. The first book was originally published as two books, starting in 1994. An ancient whale species recreated through a genetic experiment turns out to have been telepathic, and the whales issue a telepathic call which cause most of humanity and other large land mammals to walk into the oceans and drown.
Television	1994	Disease	Stephen King's The Stand		TV miniseries
Television	1994	Impact Event	Highlander: The Animated Series		
Game	1994	Impact Event	Illusion of Gaia		A Super NES game where a comet passes next to Earth, which is a malicious being whose light turns humans into monsters. The story takes place in an altered reality, where the approaching comet already changed the timeline and reality.
Game	1994	Supernatural	Final Fantasy VI		Titled Final Fantasy III in its initial American launch, this RPG features a plot twist in where villain Kefka moves magical statues out of their intended alignment, which in turn causes the balanced fictional world to fall into ruin, and Kefka to become its new god while protected by the powers of the same statues.
Game	1994	Technology	Metaltech: Earthsiege		And its sequels, from Sierra Entertainment
Game	1994	Technology	Rise of the Robots		Multi-developed by Mirage Studios. A fighting game.
Game	1994	Technology	System Shock		Looking Glass Technologies – incorporates elements from the alien invasion theory.
Game	1994	Impact event	Primal Rage		A fighting-style game where a meteor hits Earth and wipes out modern technology, reducing them to several Stone Age-type tribespeople. The continents are rearranged, and seven dinosaur-like deities fight for control over the new Urth.
Novel	1994–1996	Future collapse	Reaches	David Drake	
Television	1994	Aliens, impact event	Without Warning		Directed by Robert Iscove, and originally broadcast over the CBS television network
Novel	1994	Unspecified	Vanishing Point	Michaela Roessner	Life in Silicon Valley 30 years after the mysterious and spontaneous disappearance of 90% of the world's population. The Winchester Mystery House ("The House") serves as a focal point for parallel universes and inexplicable energies that are changing the world and its post-Vanishing children.
Manga	1994–2006	Eco	Yokohama Kaidashi Kikou	Hitoshi Ashinano	Japanese manga series, set in a peaceful post-cataclysmic Japan, after an untold environmental disaster
Film	1995	War	Fist of the North Star		Live-action martial arts film based on the manga of the same name
Film	1995	War	Judge Dredd		
Film	1995	Disease	12 Monkeys		Directed by Terry Gilliam – Based on La jetée (see above).
Film	1995	Impact Event	Tank Girl		Loosely based on the comic book series by Jamie Hewlett
Game	1995	Aliens	Chrono Trigger		The console game, where modern civilization is at risk of being destroyed by an alien parasite in AD 1999
Film	1995	Eco	Waterworld		Global warming has caused all landmasses on Earth to be covered by the sea. The remnants of humanity survive on "atolls", mechanical floating cities that are constantly attacked by pirates with steam-driven ships. Some humans have evolved to become amphibious to live among the old wreckage beneath the waves. Many people live in hope of finding the mythical "Dryland", the place safe from the seas (which turns out to be the Himalayan Mountains).
Novel	1995	Eco	Mother of Storms	John Barnes	A tactical nuclear strike in the North Pacific releases massive amounts of methane, spawning worldwide super-hurricanes
Novel	1995	Eco	Ill Wind	Kevin J. Anderson, Doug Beason	A microbe consumes all materials based on petroleum
Film	1995	Technology	Screamers	Philip K. Dick, Dan O'Bannon, Miguel Tejada-Flores	Based on the novelette Second Variety by Philip K. Dick
Novel	1995	Supernatural	The End of the Age	Pat Robertson	
Novel series	1995–2007	Supernatural	Left Behind		Novel series concerning the Rapture
Film	1995	War	Fist of the North Star		A live-action film based on the manga of the same name about a battle for control of a post World War III world.
Novel	1995/2005	Eco	The Mara and Dann novels	Doris Lessing	Mara and Dann and its sequel, Story of General Dann and Mara's Daughter, Griot and the Snow Dog, are set in a future ice age. Other Lessing novels, like Memoirs of a Survivor and Shikasta, also deal with apocalyptic themes.
Other	1995–	War	Ayreon	Arjen Anthony Lucassen	Series of concept albums depicting the end of life on Earth in 2084 due to, among other factors, a catastrophic nuclear war
Comic	1995	Technology	Tales of the Jedi: Dark Lords of the Sith		Comics, great Droid Revolution
Television	1995	Technology	Space: Above and Beyond		A subplot involves humanity fighting a race of cyborgs called Silicates.
Game	1995	Technology	I Have No Mouth, and I Must Scream		From Cyberdreams
Game	1995	Technology	Vertical Force		A vertical shoot-'em-up scroller game, with two layers for Nintendo's Virtual Boy video game system.
Game	1995	Technology	Red Alarm		Nintendo
Television	1995	Supernatural	Neon Genesis Evangelion		Humanity's unearthing of a being known as Adam brings about the Second Impact, a catastrophic shockwave which destroys Antarctica and subsequently leads to the extinction of thousands of organisms, the destruction of much of the civilized world, and the deaths of billions. Millions more die from the social and economic troubles which follow this impact and the ensuing wars.
Game	1995	Supernatural	Mortal Kombat 3		The third installment of the Mortal Kombat series. Supernatural warlord Shao Kahn has taken over the realm of Earth, taking the souls of much of the populace. Extermination squads roam the land in search of the few surviving Kombatants that oppose him.
Game	1995–present	Eco	The Command & Conquer: Tiberian series		A radioactive, self-replicating alien crystal known as Tiberium crashes on Earth in 1995 and gradually renders most of the Earth's surface uninhabitable over the next several decades.
Film	1996	Eco	Escape from L.A.		The sequel to Escape from New York, the film is set in an America that has become a theocratic dictatorship. Central to the plot is Los Angeles Island, the remains of what was once the city of Los Angeles after "the Big One", where those who break the government's new laws are deported to.
Film	1996	War	Star Trek: First Contact		A late-21st century Earth is devastated by nuclear conflict.
Manga	1996–2008	Future collapse	Trigun	Yasuhiro Nightow	
Novel	1996	Future collapse	Endymion	Dan Simmons	Plus a sequel called The Rise of Endymion
Novel	1996	War	Arc Light	Eric L. Harry	Limited nuclear war between the United States and Russia
Film	1996	Aliens	Independence Day		A fleet of alien warships appear over several Earth cities and lay waste to them.
Film	1996	Aliens	Mars Attacks!		Based on the trading card series Mars Attacks (1962)
Novel	1996	Aliens	The Killing Star	Charles Pellegrino, George Zebrowski	Aliens conduct a preemptive strike against humanity with relativistic missiles
Story	1996	Aliens	War of the Worlds: Global Dispatches		Edited by Kevin J. Anderson – an anthology of short stories set during the events of The War of the Worlds by H. G. Wells
Film	1996	Technology	Omega Doom		
Novel	1996	Technology	Therefore I Am: The Tale of IG-88	Kevin J. Anderson	
Game	1996	Human decline	The House of the Dead		The House of the Dead series of Sega video games. Scientist Dr. Curien finds a way to reanimate the dead, though not without disastrous results. Later in the series' timeline, Caleb Goldman uses the undead in his mission to destroy the human race and protect the Earth from further destruction by humans.
Television	1996, 1999	Technology	The Outer Limits		The 1996 episode "Resurrection" and the 1999 episode "The Human Operators"
Television	1996–1997	Impact Event	After War Gundam X		In the series' backstory, a brutal war sees multiple space colonies dropped on Earth, rendering much of the world uninhabitable.
Game	1996–present	Disease	Resident Evil		A multi-video game series
Television	1997	Sun	"The Deconstruction of Falling Stars"	J. Michael Straczynski	An episode of Babylon 5
Film	1997	War	The Postman		Partly based on the David Brin novel; starring Kevin Costner
Novel series	1997–	Aliens	Outlanders	Mark Ellis (pseudonym James Axler)	
Game	1997	Disease	POD: Planet of Death		A mining accident unleashes a virus from within the colonized Jovian moon Io. Races are held to determine the winner of the last seat in the last shuttle leaving.
Novel	1997	War	Aftermath	LeVar Burton	American civilization crumbles after a civil war pitting blacks against whites and a devastating earthquake
Game	1997	Impact Event	Dark Earth		Set in an unspecified post-apocalyptic region on an Earth shrouded by an impact winter and plagued by a dangerous mutagenic substance called "Archessence" – the game centers on a technologically regressed medieval-like society.
Game	1997	War	Interstate '76		Game from Activision
Game	1997	War	The KKnD series		
Television	1997	Impact Event	Asteroid		
Novel	1997	Impact Event	Titan	Stephen Baxter	About a crewed mission to Titan while China directs an asteroid to hit Earth
Novel	1997	Aliens	The Alien Years	Robert Silverberg	
Novel	1997	Supernatural	Shade's Children	Garth Nix	A novel in which a group of extradimensional beings invade Earth and cause all human adults over the age of 14 to vanish
Game	1997	Aliens	Spellcross		Turn-based strategy game on PC
Game	1997	Eco	7th Legion		PC game. The Chosen, a group consisting of a corporate- and government-determined human elect, depart a heavily polluted Earth via a fleet of starships, returning as a force to re-occupy Earth, fighting against the titular 7th Legion, a coalition of the most advanced post-apocalypse humans on Earth.
Game	1997	Technology	GURPS Reign of Steel		A setting for the GURPS role-playing system, where machines have taken over the world after a war with humanity that the humans lost.
Film	1997	Human decline	The End of Evangelion		All humankind are reverted to a "primordial soup" and merged into a single consummate being.
Manga series	1997–	War	Desert Punk	Usune Masatoshi	Later adapted into an anime series
Manga	1997–2008	Disease	Eden: It's an Endless World!	Hiroki Endo	
Film	1997	Unspecified	Alien Resurrection		Features a deleted scene (restored to the film in the Alien Quadrilogy box set) in which Ripley and the other survivors land the Auriga in a devastated Paris. The cause of the destruction is never made clear.
Film	1997	Unspecified	Trucks		Canadian/American made-for-TV adaptation of the Stephen King short story by the same name.
Game	1997–present	War	The Fallout series		A nuclear war in 2077 devastates much of the U.S. Players start out in underground shelters called Vaults.
Film	1998	War	Six-String Samurai		
Game	1998	War	BattleTanx		Vehicular combat game from The 3DO Company. Nearly all women around the world are killed in a nuclear war and the few female survivors are prized by men.
Game	1998	War	Vigilante 8		Activision
Novel	1998	Disease	The Transall Saga	Gary Paulsen	
Television	1998	Supernatural	Silent Mobius	Kia Asamiya	The manga and subsequent anime movies and TV series set in a Blade Runner-style world which has been invaded by demonic beings.
Novel	1998	Impact Event	Moonfall	Jack McDevitt	
Film	1998	Sun	Last Night	Don McKellar	Follows the lives of several individuals as they cope with their final six hours on Earth before its apparent incineration by the Sun (the cause of the apocalypse is never directly stated)
Film	1998	Aliens	The Faculty		Directed by Robert Rodriguez – six students are about to find out that their teachers are really from another planet
Game	1998	Aliens	Half-Life		A resonance cascade causes extra-dimensional aliens to invade Earth
Other	1998	Aliens	Getter Robo Armageddon		OVA, where a combination of a nuclear missile and amorphous alien Invaders results in a war with the fate of humanity at stake
Novel	1998	Eco	Aftermath	Charles Sheffield	Alpha Centauri goes supernova and causes cataclysmic climate change
Novel	1998	Eco	Dust	Charles Pellegrino	All the insect species on Earth die out, and the ecology crashes as a result
Game	1998	Technology	RayCrisis		MultiA prequel to RayForce
Game	1998	Supernatural	Tribe 8		A role-playing game in which sadistic demons invade (and conquer) Earth.
Game	1998	Technology	KKnD2: Krossfire		The sequel to KKnD; as part of its plot, Series 9 are advanced farming robots that have taken it unto themselves to destroy all life
Other	1998	Technology	Obsolete		Fear Factory
Game	1998	Future collapse	Xenogears		PlayStation game set in a world with two nations fighting with weapons found in ancient ruins. Also, human fossils are all recent on the planet.
Novel	1998	Disease	Eternity Road	Jack McDevitt	1,700 years after a deadly plague has wiped out the great civilizations of man, the survivors' descendants have built up a new, comparably primitive society.
Film	1998	Supernatural	Apocalypse		Also, the series of films made in the 1990s and 2000s by Cloud Ten Pictures
Game	1998	Aliens, technology (cyber-terrorism)	Red Baron 2573		
Television	1998–1999	Eco	Cowboy Bebop		Disaster. The 1998–1999 anime series in which a man-made disaster has caused Earth's Moon to fragment, resulting in a constant rain of meteor strikes on the planet and forcing humanity to move out into the Solar System.
Television	1999	War	Now and Then, Here and There		An anime series that takes place 10 billion years into the future, where humanity lusts for power and children are forced into military duty.
Novel	1999	War	Resurrection Day	Brendan DuBois	Set 10 years after the Cuban Missile Crisis, which escalated into nuclear war
Game	1999	War	BattleTanx: Global Assault		Game from The 3DO Company – sequel to BattleTanx
Game	1999	War	Warzone 2100		
Television	1999	Disease	Crusade		A spin-off from the TV show Babylon 5
Game	1999	Disease	Abomination: The Nemesis Project		Video game
Television	1999	Impact Event	The Last Train		Cruel Earth in Canada. British TV six-part drama.
Television	1999	Impact Event	Thunderstone		
Game	1999	Aliens	Chrono Cross		The 1999 console game, where in alternate timelines modern civilization was destroyed by an alien parasite in AD 1999
Novel	1999	Eco	The Rift	Walter Jon Williams	
Game	1999	Technology	System Shock 2		Sequel to System Shock
Comic	1999–2004	Technology	The Matrix Comics		Originally released as webcomics
Game	1999	Technology	Galerians		PlayStation, developed by Polygon Magic
Game	1999	Technology	Descent 3		PC developed by Outrage Entertainment, which explains that mostly mining robots were attacked by an unknown virus and are now attacking people
Television	1999	Human decline	The Big O		The Japanese manga and anime, where humans apparently suffered mass amnesia 40 years prior and are afraid to leave their city, Paradigm – it is a sort of mecha/apocalypse subclass of its own; the protagonist has to battle mechanical beings and other robots who are trying to destroy the remnants of the human race.
Television	1999	Monsters	Future Shock		Godzilla: The Series episode, the H.E.A.T. crew passes through a mysterious time-storm and travels to a post-apocalyptic 2022 where the earth has been overrun by monsters called D.R.A.G.M.A.s.
Game	1999	Future collapse	Homeworld		PCDeveloper Relic Entertainment – A small human civilization on the desert planet of Kharak on the edge of the galaxy is brought to the brink of extinction for violating a forgotten 5,000-year-old treaty forbidding them from developing hyperspace technology. The survivors, however, are fortunate to have the use of the recently completed Mothership – a large colony vessel meant to take them back to their ancient and forgotten homeworld near the center of the galaxy, Hiigara – The game was succeeded by sequels Homeworld: Cataclysm and Homeworld 2.
Game	1999–2000	War	Sid Meier's Alpha Centauri		A ship leaves Earth on the eve of World War III to found a new colony orbiting Alpha Centauri
Television	1999–2003	Disease	The Tribe		New Zealand TV series that takes place in a near-future in which all the adults have been killed by a man-made virus and the children have to survive on their own
Film	1999–2003	Technology	The Matrix		Series of films dealing with a future where machines have trapped humanity in an illusory world, and the struggle of the surviving humans of the post-apocalyptic real world to free the rest of humanity from the illusion
Film	2000	War	On the Beach		A remake of the 1959 film.
Game	2000	War	Earth 2150		Also Earth 2160 – the world is destroyed in 2150 and people settle on Mars in 2160
Game	2000	Disease	Deus Ex		PC game in relation to the Gray Death
Game	2000	Impact Event	The Legend of Zelda: Majora's Mask		A Nintendo 64 game where the main character, Link, has three days to save the world of Termina from its moon that has broken from orbit
Manga series	2000–2001	War	Saikano	Shin Takahashi	
Film	2000	Aliens	Battlefield Earth		Based on the novel of the same name by L. Ron Hubbard
Film	2000	Aliens	Titan A.E.		2000 animated post-apocalyptic dystopian science fiction
Game	2000	Technology	Gunlok		A squad-based action-adventure computer game developed by Rebellion Developments
Novel	2000	Supernatural	Demons	John Shirley	Revolves around a demonic invasion of Earth
Comic	2000–2014	Impact event, war	Battle Angel Alita: Last Order	Yukito Kishiro	A continuation of the former manga series containing the same elements as the previous series, but goes into greater detail as to how the dystopia came about
Television	2000–2002	Social Collapse	Dark Angel	James Cameron, Charles H. Eglee	After terrorists detonate a nuclear weapon in the Earth's orbit, all computer data is destroyed, bringing about an economic collapse, but with minimal loss of life.
Television	2000–2005	Future collapse	Andromeda	Gene Roddenberry	
Film	2000–	Supernatural	Left Behind		Film series based on the book series, concerning the Rapture
Novel	2000	Eco	The Last Book in the Universe	Rodman Philbrick	
Story	2001	War	"Autobahn nach Poznan"	Andrzej Ziemianski	
Comic	2001–2002	Sun	Just a Pilgrim	Garth Ennis	Limited series by Ennis depicting the adventures of a man traveling on Earth's surface a few years after a solar event called The Burn. Followed by a sequel, Just a Pilgrim: Garden of Eden.
Novel	2001–2005	Monsters	Trinity Blood	Sunao Yoshida	Illustrations by Thores Shibamoto – Light novel involving a war between humans and vampires
Game	2001–	Aliens	Halo series		An alien alliance called the Covenant begin attacking human colonies in 2525. By 2552, almost all of the human colonies are destroyed and the Covenant are attacking Earth.
Story	2001	Disease	"After the Plague"	T. Coraghessan Boyle	Short story and collection
Novel series	2001	War	Mortal Engines Quartet	Philip Reeve	First book 2001. Set in the distant future after a nuclear war. Cities are turned into machines on wheels which hunt other cities and 'eat' them. The first book follows the story of two children who have fallen off a city, and are trying to find it again so they can get back on, while the dictator of their city plans on using a weapon to destroy all of the land dwellers – people who have not upgraded their cities to be on wheels.
Game	2001	War	Darwin's World		A role-playing game from Impressions
Film	2001	Disease	Ever Since the World Ended		A faux documentary set in San Francisco 12 years after a plague kills most of humanity and only 186 people remain in the city.
Novel	2001	Disease	Idlewild	Nick Sagan	
Anime	2001–2002	Supernatural	X/1999	Clamp	Anime in which the Seven Dragons of Heaven battle the Dragons of Earth to save the world
Novel	2001	Disease	The Night of the Triffids	Simon Clark	Sequel to The Day of the Triffids by John Wyndham
Game	2001	Disease	After the Bomb		Role-playing game
Novel	2001	Impact Event	The Peshawar Lancers	S.M. Stirling	
Game	2001	Impact Event	Ace Combat 04: Shattered Skies		PlayStation 2 game centered in a fictional continent years after an asteroid crashes at several locations
Game	2001	Supernatural	Final Fantasy X		A role-playing game, in which an advanced civilization is threatened and destroyed by supernatural forces that religion is knowingly, and in some ways unknowingly, centered on.
Film	2001	Human decline	A.I.		Depicts human extinction after 2,000 years
Film	2001	Aliens	Final Fantasy: The Spirits Within		CGI animated film about spirit-based aliens roaming Earth after an asteroid crash over 30 years before
Game	2001	Technology	Outlive		A real-time strategy. Earth created robotic lifeforms allegedly to mine Titan's resources, though in reality they were to be used as a secret army. When the plan surfaced, the World Council lost power but the robots returned and occupied the planet in the name of their creators.
Game	2001	Human decline	Pikmin		And its sequel, the 2004 video game Pikmin 2, is set on an unnamed planet simply called as the planet of the Pikmin, inhabited by animals and plants. Although it is unnamed in-game, several cutscenes show it as Earth, or at least a very Earth-like planet. Further hints are man-made objects in both games like the Abstract Masterpiece, a bottle cap, and the Remembered Old Buddy, a R.O.B., as well as the stage based on the Pikmin planet in Super Smash Bros. Brawl, Distant Planet, which its data refers to as Earth.
Film	2001	Monsters	Kairo	Kiyoshi Kurosawa	In which the world is overrun by humanoid ghosts, and everything is destroyed by them. Based on a novel of the same name.
Game	2001	Sun	Tetris Worlds		
Television	2001–2002	Technology	Digimon Tamers		
Film	2002	War	Equilibrium		After barely surviving another worldwide conflict, humanity rejects all emotion and outlaws all forms of expression which might encourage emotional response.
Television	2002	Human decline	The Future Is Wild		Uses computer animation to simulate the sort of creatures that may evolve from present-day animals. In the world depicted in the series, the human race has left Earth to colonize the stars. The future descendants of humanity have sent probes back to Earth to record what has become of it.
Television	2002	War	Saikano		Anime series
Film	2002	Zombies	28 Days Later		Ordinary citizens are forced to fight through hordes of rabid zombies after a virus ravages Britain
Film	2002	Disease	Teenage Caveman		Directed by Larry Clark – set in the post-apocalyptic future where after the majority of humans die from a mysterious viral plague, the remaining humans have conformed to primitive tribalism
Television	2002	Disease	Smallpox		TV movie
Novel	2002	Disease	The Years of Rice and Salt	Kim Stanley Robinson	Set in a world devastated by the Black Death in medieval Europe, which killed 99% of the European population before they could discover the Americas
Game	2002	Disease	Soldiers of Anarchy		PC video game featuring a group of ex-soldiers who spent 10 years underground after the Spontaneous Genome Degeneration Syndrome (SGDS), an artificially created virus raged across the globe in 2004, nearly wiping off humanity. Although the virus was released to make money with the antidote, it was not distributed for some reason.
Film	2002	Impact Event	The Time Machine		Downfall of man caused by the Moon breaking apart and bombarding Earth with rocks after extensive lunar mining
Film	2002	Aliens	Signs		Directed by M. Night Shyamalan
Film	2002	Eco	Jason X		The 10th Friday the 13th film – Earth became a polluted wasteland by 2455, so humanity left Earth and colonized a planet designated as Earth 2
Game	2002	Eco	The Legend of Zelda: The Wind Waker		Video game in which a flood has decimated the fictional world of Hyrule
Novel	2002	Technology	The Butlerian Jihad	Kevin J. Anderson	Part of the Dune universe
Film	2002	Monsters	Reign of Fire		Dragons wreak havoc and destroy human civilization
Television	2002–2003	War	Mobile Suit Gundam Seed		Anime series involving a war between naturally-born humans (Naturals) and genetically enhanced humans (Coordinators)
Television	2002–2003	Eco	Overman King Gainer		Anime series, which depicts humanity living in domes after an ecological disaster
Game	2002–2004	War	Neocron		Game for the Personal Computer by Reakktor Media
Television	2002–2004	Disease	Jeremiah		Showtime cable television series, based on the comic book of the same name. In the year 2021, 15 years after a virus kills everyone over the age of puberty, the child survivors have grown up, living on the scraps of the old world.
Novel	2002–2004	Technology	The Legends Of Dune trilogy		Part of the Dune universe
Comic	2002–2008	Disease	Y: The Last Man		Comic book series that features a lone man and his pet monkey as the last living male mammals in a world populated only by women; series written by Brian K. Vaughan and published by Vertigo Comics
Comic	2002	War	Hulk: The End		The Hulk is the last human on earth around 200 years after a nuclear war has turned the planet into a nuclear wasteland.
Novel	2002–2004	Eco	The Snowfall Trilogy	Mitchell Smith	Novel trilogy comprising Snowfall, Kingdom River, and Moonrise. North America has retreated into hunter-gatherer societies and military kingdoms some 500 years after an apocalyptic ice age
Comic	2003	War	Judge Dredd vs. Aliens		
Television	2003	Human decline	Wolf's Rain		This manga/anime series takes place in a post-apocalyptic world, where constant conflicts between nobles leaves whole parts of the earth uninhabited, cities in ruins, and technology rare. Only the nobles possess futuristic ships, and the richest have domed cities where the debilitated Earth can still support life. Wolves are proclaimed extinct, but found a way to enchant humans. Five wolves are on a quest to find 'Paradise', along with a Flower-Maiden, who was created from a Lunar Flower by a Noble. A second apocalypse ends the series, with a presumable renewing of the planet. Four of the five characters are seen in the renewed world.
Song	2003	Unspecified	Absolution		Apocalyptic album by the band Muse
Film	2003	War	Deathlands: Homeward Bound		Based on the book series Deathlands
Film	2003	War	Time of the Wolf		
Novel	2003	War	The City of Ember	Jeanne DuPrau	A novel set in an underground city 241 years after a nuclear war.
Novel	2003	War	Revelation by Lord John; Pl. Apokalipsa wedlug Pana Jana	Robert J. Szmidt	
Novel	2003	War	The Third World War	Humphrey Hawksley	
Game	2003	War	Judge Dredd: Dredd Vs. Death		Game
Novel	2003	Disease	Full Circle	David Mitchell	
Film	2003	Human decline	Le Temps du Loup		Michael Haneke's film (The Time of the Wolf) follows a family through the (French?) countryside after an undefined catastrophic collapse of civilization.
Story	2003	Impact Event	Shikari in Galveston		
Novel	2003	Supernatural	The Rising	Brian Keene	Plus its sequel City of the Dead. Rather than the zombies being an infection, as in most zombie fiction; these zombies are reanimated by demonic entities, the Sisquisim, from the Old Testament.
Novel series	2003	Aliens	Vampire Earth	E. E. Knight	
Game	2003	Aliens	UFO: Aftermath		The computer game and its sequels UFO: Aftershock and UFO: Afterlight by Altar Games
Film	2003	Eco	Dragon Head		Based on the manga of the same name
Film	2003	Eco	It's All About Love		
Novel	2003	Eco	Oryx and Crake	Margaret Atwood	
Novel	2003	Eco	Clade	Mark Budz	
Television	2003	Eco	Encrypt		Set in the year 2068, the Earth's surface is in a cataclysmic upheaval, much of it transformed into wasteland by unstoppable storms (the byproduct of the destruction of the ozone layer). It was directed by Oscar Luis Costo.
Film	2003	Technology	Galerians: Rion		
Song album	2003	Technology	The Protomen	The Protomen	The band's self-titled rock opera album
Anime	2003	Technology	Texhnolyze	Hamasaki Hiroshi(Information by My Anime List)	
Novel	2003	Technology	Robota	Orson Scott Card, Doug Chiang	Also illustrated by Chiang.
Novel	2003	Technology	The Machine Crusade	Kevin J. Anderson	Part of the Dune universe
Game	2003	Technology	Neuroshima		The Polish role-playing game from Portal Publishing
Game	2003	Social Collapse	Deus Ex: Invisible War		Ion Storm (developer) Eidos Interactive (publisher). After total global economic collapse (an event known simply as "The Collapse", all religion is collected into one, which is in conflict with the new world order. Throughout the game, the player can choose to be on either side, affecting the game's outcome.
Novel	2003–2007	Aliens	The Legacy Trilogy	Ian Douglas	
Film	2004	War	Appleseed		
Film	2004	War, Technology	Casshern		Based on two Japanese anime series. A race of super-robots led by their leader, Black King, take over the world.
Novel	2004	War	Cloud Atlas	David Mitchell	One of the six novellas by Mitchell set in a post-apocalyptic future
Novel	2004	War	The People of Sparks	Jeanne DuPrau	The second book in DuPrau's City of Ember series.
Novel	2004–2009	Human decline	Biomega	Tsutomu Nihei	Followed the manga NOiSE, Blame! and Net Sphere Engineer by Nihei. Published between 2004 and 2009
Film	2004	Zombies	Dawn of the Dead		Individuals try and survive a zombie outbreak by securing a shopping mall. Remake of the 1978 movie.
Novel	2004	War	Cowl	Neal Asher	
Other	2004–	Impact event	Compilation of Final Fantasy VII		Includes video games, short stories, and animated features; revolves largely around the fate of a planet which is ravaged by the impact a giant meteor/asteroid, summoned by magic; published between 2004 and 2009
Novel	2004	War	Fitzpatrick's War	Theodore Judson	
Game	2004	Aliens	Half-Life 2		Game from Valve; the game is set in 20 years after an multidimensional organization successfully takes over Earth in 7 hours, transforming humans into a slave labor force.
Novel	2004	Disease	A Planet for the President	Alistair Beaton	
Novel	2004	Disease	White Devils	Paul McAuley	
Film	2004	Impact Event	Post Impact		The asteroid Bay-Leder 7 was found to be powerful enough to wipe out the whole civilization. Although a top-secret experimental satellite weapon was able to cut it in two, the smaller piece impacted in West Russia, turning Europe into an ice-covered "death zone".
Film	2004	Eco	The Day After Tomorrow		Based in part on the novel The Coming Global Superstorm by Art Bell and Whitley Strieber
Novel	2004	Eco	Crache	Mark Budz	
Novel	2004–	Unspecified	The Emberverse series	S. M. Stirling	Series of novels and short stories. A disaster of indeterminate cause (most speculation within the novels concerns an all-powerful outside force, often facetiously referred to as "alien space bats") causes electricity, combustion engines, and modern explosives to cease functioning.
Novel	2004	Eco	The Snow	Adam Roberts	The world is buried under kilometers of unnatural snow
Television	2004	Eco	10.5		The 2004 miniseries 10.5 and its 2006 follow-up 10.5: Apocalypse; in which a series of earthquakes tears America apart, separating the West Coast from the rest of the U.S.
Game	2004	Eco	The Fall: Last Days of Gaia		PC – A German 3D role-playing game situated in a post-apocalyptic future where humanity is facing its possible end. The focus of the game is the deep story and the unique characters, with living environment offering many well-thoughtout sidequests. Gameplay similar to the Fallout series, although with a more traditional RPG approach in which the player can assemble a whole party in order to improve chances in battles and include specialists with complementary skills.
Film	2004	Technology	Sky Captain and the World of Tomorrow		
Comic	2004	War	The Punisher: The End		
Novel	2004	Technology	The Battle of Corrin	Kevin J. Anderson	Part of the Dune universe
Manga series	2004	Technology	Deus Vitae	Takuya Fujima	
Novel	2004	Supernatural	The Taking	Dean Koontz	A novel in which a malevolent demonic force kills off the majority of the human race
Game	2004	Supernatural	The Shadow of Yesterday		A role-playing game in which the unification of all people in a fantasy world under a single, supernatural language results in the destruction of a world by what is presumed to be an asteroid that becomes that world's new Moon, one that eclipses the Sun for a week out of each month.
Television	2004	Technology	Zentrix		
Game	2004	Technology	Splicers		A role-playing game set in the midst of a war between humans and a worldwide computer intelligence
Television	2004	Supernatural	Just the Two of Us!		The Fairly OddParents episode, Timmy wishes that he, his crush Trixie and his fairy god parents were the only intelligent life on earth.
Game	2004	Technology	Planetarian: The Reverie of a Little Planet		MultiIs a Japanese post-apocalyptic visual novel
Film	2004	Human decline	Idiocracy		Takes the premise that with no natural predators to thin the population of the world, evolution simply rewards whoever can pass on their genes the fastest, who are depicted as sexually promiscuous, drunken brutes. The average IQ is 80 by 2100, 60 by 2200, and 40 by 2505.
Anime	2004–2005	War	Desert Punk		Series set in a future Japan that is a wasteland. In the Great Kanto Desert, scattered humans eke out a living in the hot sand.
Novel	2004–2007	Disease	The Uglies Trilogy	Scott Westerfeld	Uglies, Pretties, Specials and the companion novel, Extras, take place in a future civilization that arose after our current civilization collapsed because of an engineered bacterium that attacked not people, but oil, changing its chemical composition so that it exploded on contact with oxygen (first explained on p. 345 of Uglies).
Novel	2005	Supernatural	The Restoration series	Terri Blackstock	Novel series covering how people react and survive after a natural EMP blast from a distant star knocks out all electronics all over the world
Television	2005	War	"Dance of the Dead"		An episode of Masters of Horror directed by Tobe Hooper – it has a triple apocalyptic theme as it features a man-made virus causing a zombie outbreak after World War III.
Novel	2005	War	The Goodness Gene	Sonia Levitin	Children's book
Novel	2005	War	Metro 2033	Dmitry Glukhovsky	Set in the metro tunnels of post-apocalyptic Moscow. A man named Artyom journeys to the central city of the metro, Polis, to find answers about a possible threat called the Dark Ones.
Film	2005	Disease	Æon Flux		Based on MTV's animated series Æon Flux
Game	2005	Impact Event	Guild Wars		PCA game in which, after a tutorial area set in a "pre-Searing" time, a race of beasts called the Charr summon meteors down upon the humans, destroying nearly all of the cities and all of the life (plants, animals, etc.)
Film	2005	Aliens	Alien Apocalypse		Produced by the Sci Fi Channel
Film	2005	Aliens	War of the Worlds		Directed by Steven Spielberg, along with the independent 2005 productions H.G. Wells' The War of the Worlds and H. G. Wells' War of the Worlds, all based on the H. G. Wells novel.
Novel	2005	Aliens	War of the Worlds: New Millennium	Douglas Niles	A retelling of the original The War of the Worlds story, but displaces the events to 2005. It is not a sequel, but an update.
Television	2005	Sun	"The End of the World"		An episode of the television series Doctor Who.
Novel	2005–2012	Supernatural	Power of Five		A series of fantasy and suspense novels, published between 2005 and 2012.
Television	2005		End Day		A UK television series
Radio	2005	Technology	"Humans Are Dead"		Flight of the Conchords
Novel	2005	Aliens	Eight Worlds	John Varley	
Game	2005	Aliens	Destroy All Humans!		The 2005 console game, in which the player controls a Furon alien in an attempt to overthrow humanity.
Film	2005	Eco	Serenity		The Earth's resources and biosphere get used up, prompting a mass exodus for the stars.
Film	2005	Eco	A Sound of Thunder	Peter Hyams	A group of travelers traveled in time and made changes in the past, which led to colossal alterations in the future where they came from, and in less than in a week everything in the world started changing chaotically, putting in the life of every living thing in danger.
Story	2005	Eco	The Garden Where My Rains Grows	Brian Keene	Set in a post-apocalyptic world where it started raining one day and never stopped
Film	2005	Technology	9		
Novel	2005	Technology	How to Survive a Robot Uprising	Daniel H. Wilson	A semi-satirical book.
Television	2005–2006	Future collapse	Noein		This anime features several teens living in Hakodate, Hokkaido who come in contact with their future selves using time travel as a last resort to end the destruction of their world by abducting their dear friend Haruka Kaminogi from the past as a sacrifice to make the ultimate weapon against the destroyer known as Noein.
Television	2005–2006	Aliens	Eureka Seven		Anime series and its video games are set 10,000 years after humans had to leave Earth due to a Coralian appearing in Africa. In the current timeline, the remnants of humanity are now settled on a planet they refer to as the "Promised Land".
Play	2005	War and gang violence	Mercury Fur	Philip Ridley	
Television	2005–2006	Eco	Zoids: Genesis		Anime series where an earthquake triggers a series of worldwide natural disasters that devastate Planet Zi
Comic	2005–2007	Technology	Lego Exo-Force		Comics and books
Radio	2005–present	Eco	Nebulous	Graham Duff	Radio sitcom in which much of the world was destroyed by an event known as "the Withering"
Film	2006	War	9/Tenths		About the conflict between a wealthy couple and a poor laborer after a worldwide terrorist attack isolates them in a small remote ranch
Game	2006	War	DEFCON		Created by independent British game developer Introversion Software, and inspired (in part) by the 1983 film WarGames
Comic	2006–	Unspecified	Wasteland		Comic series, which takes place roughly 100 years in the future, where North America is a dust bowl and lacking modern technology
Film	2006	War	The Beach Party at the Threshold of Hell		Dark comedy directed by Jonny Gillette
Film	2006	War	The Dark Hour		The eight-year-old boy Jesús has been living in a crumbling underground facility since he was born with eight survivors of an apocalyptic war.
Television	2006	War	Jericho		CBS – the residents of a small Kansas town remain isolated in the aftermath of a series of nuclear attacks on America
Novel	2006	War	The Book of Dave	Will Self	Split between modern London and post-apocalyptic London where a new society and religion is based on the legacy of a cab driver
Novel	2006	War	Deadlands	Scott A. Johnson	
Game	2006	War	Auto Assault		While seemingly caused by aliens, it is in fact human mistakes, breakdown and war that forges Auto Assault's apocalyptic world. Similar to the Command & Conquer series where an alien event is the catalyst needed to start decline.
Film	2006	Zombies	The Zombie Diaries		British made movie in which a virus creates a plague of zombies, viewed entirely from the POV of a character's video camera. This film was made and completed before George A. Romero's film Diary of the Dead which was shot in a similar POV perspective.
Television	2006	Human decline	Korgoth of Barbaria		Cartoon Network/Adult Swim animated parody
Novel	2006	Disease	Pandemia	Christopher Knight, Johnathan Rand	A mutated bird flu virus wipes out everyone except the young. Set in Michigan.
Novel	2006	Zombies	World War Z	Max Brooks	Novel about a global zombie outbreak and humanity's efforts to stop them
Poem	2006	Disease	Quarantine	Brian Henry	
Television	2006	Impact Event	Three Moons Over Milford		
Novel	2006	Impact Event	Life as We Knew It	Susan Beth Pfeffer	An asteroid strikes the Moon and knocks it into an orbit closer to Earth, concentrates on how a family in western Pennsylvania is affected
Game	2006	Aliens	Gears of War		The video game, which takes place on the fictional planet of Sera; humans are shown fighting a war against alien monsters that have emerged from underground.
Film	2006	Eco	The World Sinks Except Japan		A parody of Japan Sinks – all the land on Earth sinks into the ocean, with Japan being the last one to go
Novel	2006	Eco	Small-Minded Giants	Oisín McGann	
Television	2006	Eco	Innocent Venus		Set after the world population and economy is devastated by simultaneous hyper-hurricanes
Novel	2006	War	The Prophet of Yonwood	Jeanne DuPrau	The third book in DuPrau's City of Ember series
Game	2006	Eco	Battlefield 2142		PC first-person shooting game about a war fought over land unaffected by a new ice age that renders most of the Northern Hemisphere uninhabitable
Television	2006	Eco	Ergo Proxy		Anime series by the Japanese production company Manglobe – an undefined global ecological disaster has decimated the surface of Earth, and the small remaining human population lives in isolated, city-state dome complexes
Film	2006	Unspecified	Android Apocalypse		TV movie for the Sci Fi Channel
Television	2006	Technology	Lego Exo-Force		
Film	2006	Human decline	Children of Men		The human race has become infertile. Based on the book of the same name.
Novel	2006	Zombies	Cell	Stephen King	A strange cell phone signal turns ordinary humans into killer zombies
Film	2006	Zombies	The Quick and the Undead		
Film	2006, 2008	Supernatural	Pulse		And its sequels Pulse 2: Afterlife (2008) and Pulse 3: Invasion (2008)
Novel	2006	Supernatural	The Conqueror Worms	Brian Keene	A Lovecraftian tale of one of the last survivors on Earth. In the novel the world floods, causing several monsters to appear, mainly gigantic, man-eating earthworms.
Film	2006	Social Collapse	Puzzlehead		James Bai (writer/director) – set in what looks like Brooklyn "after the decline", the streets are empty and there seems to be constant random killings
Novel	2006	Unspecified	Night Work	Thomas Glavinic	A novel in which a man wakes up to find that everyone else has disappeared
Game	2006	Unspecified	Mother 3		Game Boy – in which a small group of humans escape to a post-apocalyptic utopia after the "old world" is destroyed. While the game never explains what happened to the "old world", they say that the humans were the ones that caused its destruction.
Novel	2006	Unspecified	The Road	Cormac McCarthy	After the end of the world, a father and son attempt to survive while traveling through the ruins of the United States
Television	2007	War	Masters of Science Fiction		Episode "A Clean Escape"
Novel	2007	War	Last Light	Alex Scarrow	Sudden end of oil availability leads to worldwide social collapse
Novel	2007	War	The Pesthouse	Jim Crace	
Novel	2007	War	The Slynx	Tatyana Tolstaya	
Novel	2007	War	The World Ends in Hickory Hollow	Ardath Mayhar	
Film	2007	Zombies	28 Weeks Later		Sequel to 28 Days Later. During the efforts to re-populate Britain, the discovery of a possible cure to the "Rage" virus may also begin the apocalypse all over again.
Film	2007	Disease	I Am Legend		In an abandoned New York City set in 2012, military virologist Robert Neville tries to find a cure to a man-made virus that killed almost everyone on Earth, while at the same time trying to survive against the vampiric zombies that it left behind. The third film adaptation of Richard Matheson's 1954 novel I Am Legend.
Film	2007	Disease	I Am Omega		A low-budget fourth film adaptation of Richard Matheson's 1954 novel I Am Legend made by The Asylum to capitalize on the release of the third film adaptation I Am Legend.
Game	2007	Impact event	Godzilla: Unleashed		Video game, from Pipeworks, set in the post-apocalyptic Earth in which Earth has been destroyed by crystals
Film	2007	Zombies	Resident Evil: Extinction		
Novel	2007	Disease	Plague Year	Jeff Carlson	Slated to be a trilogy
Film	2007	Impact Event	Super Comet: After The Impact		A speculative documentary produced by the Discovery Channel which hypothesizes the effects on modern-day earth of a large comet impact.
Film	2007	Aliens	The Invasion		Based on the novel The Body Snatchers by Jack Finney. A mysterious virus brought by space-borne microbes possesses humans and renders them devoid of emotion.
Film	2007	Aliens	Invasion of the Pod People		A low-budget remake of Invasion of the Body Snatchers made by The Asylum to capitalize on the release of The Invasion.
Film	2007	Aliens	Transformers		A race of robotic aliens battle for humanity.
Game	2007	Eco	Darkwind: War on Wheels		PC-MMOGA disastrous solar event in 2019 and 2020 leaves the world devastated, with only small pockets of human survivors scratching out a living in a bleak, irradiated world. Largely fueled by the stockpiles of hardware left behind by a dead civilization combined with the desperation of a new world order, the gladiatorial deathsports begin around 2035. The vast expanses of wilderness between the towns are menaced by gangs of road pirates armed with heavily armed cars and trucks and traveled by equally well armed trade groups, making a living by carrying food, fuel, and other specialist equipment between the towns.
Film	2007	Technology	Meet the Robinsons		
Film	2007	Human decline	Tooth and Nail		A group of survivors, called Foragers, take cover in an old abandoned hospital where the group attempt to re-build society. All we know of the apocalypse is that man "Ran out of gas", but not in the sense of oil, just that our time was up.
Television	2007	Monsters	Gurren Lagann		Animated TV series in which cloned "Beastmen" fight an apocalyptic battle with humanity
Game	2007	Technology	Toxic		Nitrome Limited – flash game by about a character in a yellow hazmat suit attempting to free the world from a race of robots with a variety of bombs. A sequel, Toxic 2, was released in 2008.
Film	2007	Zombies	REC	Jaume Balagueró, Paco Plaza	Spanish horror film about humans altered by a demon
Game	2007	Future collapse	Supreme Commander		PC, Xbox – set at the end of a thousand-year-long war called the Infinite War between three separate factions; the UEF (United Earth Federation), the Aeon and the Cybrans.
Film	2007	Sun	Sunshine		Directed by Danny Boyle – the film follows a spaceship crew in the year 2057 who are tasked with reigniting Earth's dying sun
Game	2007–	Aliens	Crysis		Crytek – a near future where an ancient alien spacecraft has been discovered beneath the ground on an island in the East Philippines
Game	2007	Supernatural	Hellgate: London		A PC game where humans and demons are in constant struggle on Earth.
Television	2007	Unspecified	Afterworld		American series about a man living in a post-apocalyptic United States after an unspecified cataclysm
Game	2007–2012	Technology	The Mass Effect series		Humanity and other alien races must work together to combat sentient machines called the Reapers from destroying all advanced life in the galaxy
Song	2007	Technology	"Citizens of Tomorrow"	Tokyo Police Club	Single
Film	2007–present	Supernatural	Rebuild of Evangelion		Remake of the Neon Genesis Evangelion anime series. The first of the four films, Evangelion: 1.0 You Are (Not) Alone, debuted in 2007; the second, Evangelion: 2.0 You Can (Not) Advance, in 2009; and the third, Evangelion: 3.0 You Can (Not) Redo, in 2012. The fourth is forthcoming.
Game	2007	War, supernatural	Fire Emblem: Radiant Dawn		At the end of Part 3, the main characters are forced to deliberately awaken the supposed "dark god" Yune in order to avoid her being awoken accidentally by a war which has spread across Tellius. The goddess Ashera, upon learning that the beorc and laguz have long since broken a covenant forbidding military conflict between the races, petrifies nearly all inhabitants of Tellius despite Yune's protests. This calamity leads into Part 4, where Yune, while considering how to revive the petrified people, tasks the survivors with preventing Ashera from finishing the job.
Film	2007	Unspecified	The Gene Generation		Directed by Pearry Reginald Teo
Film	2008	Zombies	Zombie Wars		Directed by David A. Prior
Game	2008	Supernatural	The Legend of Spyro: Dawn of the Dragon		The game's main antagonist Malefor the Dark Master claims that it is the destiny of all purple dragons to bring about the world's destruction. He is almost successful when the Destroyer, a massive golem he resurrected to cross the Belt of Fire and issue the world's end, completes its circle until he is defeated by the game's protagonist Spyro and Cynder and sealed away by the ancient dragons' spirits into the world's core and Spyro unleashes a powerful Fury wave to rebuild the world.
Television	2008–2011	Eco, Supernatural, Technology	Yu-Gi-Oh! 5D's		Zero Reverse was a disastrous event in which the evolutionary use of quantum mechanics in the Enerdy system led to its reactor exploding and causing a massive tectonic shift that separated a chunk of Domino City from the rest of the landmass, splitting it in two and creating an island later known as Satellite, which was the area hit hardest by the energy release, while the Earthbound Immortals were released from the Underworld.
Film	2008	War	20 Years After		Twenty years after wars, plague, and natural disasters, a young woman follows the voice of a lone radio broadcaster and delivers the first child born in 15 years.
Television	2008	Unspecified	Aftermath: Population Zero		A speculative documentary that looks at what would happen to the earth if the entire human race suddenly disappeared.
Film	2008	War	City of Ember		Based on the book of the same name by Jeanne DuPrau
Film	2008	War	Mutant Chronicles		Based on the Mutant Chronicles role-playing game
Novel	2008	War	Flood	Stephen Baxter	Book about huge underground oceans leaking to the surface, lifting sea levels by thousands of meters over several decades
Novel	2008	War	The Hunger Games trilogy	Suzanne Collins	Young adult series about a survival tournament set in a post-apocalyptic continent
Novel	2008	Eco	Flood		Earth is gradually submerged due to seismic activity that brings more water to the surface.
Novel	2008	War	The Valley-Westside War	Harry Turtledove	
Game	2008	Impact event	Advance Wars: Days of Ruin		With virtually all of humanity wiped out by a meteor strike, the game follows the exploits of an army of survivors, fighting bandit raiders and hostile armies across the planet's desolate remains.
Game	2008	War	Exodus		A post-apocalyptic role-playing game from Glutton Creeper Games set after the War on Terror destroy 99% of the world's population.
Film	2008	Disease	Doomsday		
Film	2008	Disease	Repo! The Genetic Opera		
Film	2008	Disease	The Last Man		Based upon Mary Shelley's 1826 novel The Last Man
Television	2008	Disease	Survivors		BBC television series, a remake of the 1970s series of the same name
Novel	2008	Disease	The Martian General's Daughter		Collapse of global civilization caused by virus-like nanotechnology
Game	2008	Zombies	Left 4 Dead		Multiplayer video game released by Valve. Featuring people transformed into crazed zombie-like mutants by an infection. The game diverges from the traditional zombie trope with the inclusion of "special infected" or zombies with specialized traits.
Novel	2008	Impact Event	The Dead and the Gone	Susan Beth Pfeffer	How the same event as in Life as We Knew It affects a family in New York City
Novel	2008	Aliens	The Host	Stephenie Meyer	An alien race, called Souls, take over Earth and its inhabitants. The novel follows one Soul's predicament when the mind of its human host refuses to cooperate with her takeover.
Film	2008	Eco	The Happening		The movie depicts an unknown deadly neurotoxin.
Film	2008	Eco	Lost City Raiders		
Film	2008	Eco	WALL-E		Earth is abandoned in 2105 after becoming too polluted to sustain life. WALL•E robots have been left behind to clean up Earth, but all but one remains active as of 2805.
Television	2008	Eco	"The Poison Sky"		A Doctor Who episode. The poisonous Sontaran gases (creating the titular "poison sky") above Sylvia and Wilfred's street ignite as the flames from the Doctor's atmospheric converter spread globally.
Game	2008	Technology	Too Human		
Film	2008	Zombies	Quarantine		American remake of the 2007 Spanish horror film REC
Television	2008	Zombies	Dead Set		A UK television series which chronicles a zombie outbreak
Novel	2008	Supernatural	Therefore Repent!	Jim Munroe	illustrated by Salgood Sam. A post-Rapture graphic novel
Television	2008	Societal collapse	"Turn Left" (Doctor Who story #197)	Russell T. Davies	Explores an apocalyptic parallel universe in which British society has collapsed due to the death of the Doctor
Novel	2008	Social Collapse	World Made By Hand	James Kunstler	Explores life in an agrarian village in upstate New York after America collapses under the combined trauma of plague, peak oil, global warming, and nuclear terrorism
Film	2008	Unspecified	Life After People		A TV documentary film and its spin-off Life After People: The Series document life on Earth after all humans have instantly disappeared. The shows do not mention a cause of their disappearance.
Novel	2008	War	The Diamond of Darkhold	Jeanne DuPrau	The fourth book in DuPrau's City of Ember series
Novel	2008	War	The Diamond of Darkhold	Jeanne DuPrau	The fourth book in DuPrau's City of Ember series
Film	2008	Unspecified	From Inside		A pregnant woman travels across a bleak, apocalyptic landscape on a train. Based on the graphic novel of the same name by Greg Bergin
Film	2009	Eco	Astro Boy		Astro Boy (a robotic version of his creator's lost son) lives in highly advanced Metro City; the last of its kind floating above the clouds in the skies of post-apocalyptic Earth.
Film	2009	Disease	Carriers		A group of four people on the road trying to find a safe haven while plague rages across the U.S..
Film	2009	Disease	Daybreakers		A virus changes most of the populace into vampires sometime around 2019. At the point where vampirism is considered "normal", the remaining humans attempt to escape being farmed for their blood, while also attempting to find a cure.
Film	2009	Zombies	La Horde		Directed by Benjamin Rocher. The film is set in one of the French tower blocks, wherein a small group of people trying to make their way out of it thrust through hordes of zombies.
Novel	2009	Disease	The Killing Moon	Rod Glenn	Five friends struggle to survive 20 years after the collapse of civilization. Set in northern England.
Game	2009	Zombies	Left 4 Dead 2		The sequel to Left 4 Dead. Expands upon the original game with new characters, maps, and weapons.
Film	2009	Disease	Autumn		
Game	2009	Disease	Killing Floor		PCCooperative first-person shooter video game.
Television	2009–2010	Supernatural	Supernatural		Seasons 4 and 5 were based around the pre-apocalyptic world in which the angels are gearing up for a battle between Heaven and Hell.
Film	2009	Eco	2012		
Novel	2009	Eco	The Windup Girl	Paolo Bacigalupi	In future Thailand, where calories are the most needed energy source, an unexpected girl struggles to live like as she wants
Television	2009	Eco	Earth 2100		Time travel fiction. The 2009 ABC special Earth 2100 explores a possible future if humans do not take actions to help the ecosystem, which could prove to be disastrous. Lucy, the speaker, explains about this world and wonders how she was one of the lucky humans to have survived.
Film	2009	Technology	9		Adaptation of the 2005 film 9
Television	2009	Technology	Power Rangers: RPM (American adaptations of Engine Sentai Go-onger)		The Power Rangers protect the last remnants of humanity, who are now settled in the domed city of Corinth, after the accidental release of a government created computer virus known as "Venjix". Malicious and self-aware, it leaves most of the planet in nuclear fallout, constructs an army of attack-bots and begins cybernetic experiments on human prisoners.
Novel	2009	Zombies	The Forest of Hands and Teeth	Carrie Ryan	Set generations after the zombie apocalypse, a girl struggles against the religious order in her village hoping for life beyond the fences protecting them from the Unconsecrated (zombies) in the surrounding forest
Film	2009	Zombies	REC 2	Jaume Balagueró, Paco Plaza	The sequel to the 2007 Spanish horror film REC
Film	2009	Sun	Knowing		A film where the end of the world, caused by a solar flare erupting onto the Solar System, is accurately predicted.
Novel	2009	War, Terrorism	The War After Armageddon	Ralph Peters	Islamic extremists launch a series of dirty bomb attacks against the West, which results in a backlash against Muslims. A radical Christian government takes over the U.S. and sends the Army, Marines, and a National Guard full of evangelicals to invade and retake a long-nuked Israel.
Novel	2009	Social Collapse	Patriots: A Novel of Survival in the Coming Collapse	James Wesley Rawles	An apocalyptic survivalist novel about a total socioeconomic collapse
Film	2009	Unspecified	Les derniers jours du monde		A French film. Depicts the story of a man, Robinson, who travels across France and Spain during the end of the world.
Film	2009	Unspecified	The Road		A film based upon the novel The Road by Cormac McCarthy.
Song album	2009	Unspecified	Songs from the Floodplain	Jon Boden	
Novel	2009	Technology	One Second After		
Comic	2009 to present	Disease	Sweet Tooth	Jeff Lemire	Also illustrated by Lemire, and published by Vertigo Comics. About a young human/deer hybrid, who has survived an apocalyptic plague
Television	2009–2011	Aliens	V		Remake of the 1980s television series
Television	2009–2010	Disease	The Colony		Reality television style drama about a group of survivors forced to live in a warehouse in the virus-ravaged city of Los Angeles, California
Game	2009–present	War	Fallen Earth		A post-apocalyptic massively multiplayer online role-playing game from Icarus Studios and Fallen Earth LLC set in the 22nd century after the Shiva Virus has spread all over the world.
Television	2009	Eco	Tokyo Magnitude 8.0		After a massive earthquake in Tokyo 25 km under the sea at a magnitude of 8.0, siblings Mirai and Yūki, who were visiting a robot exhibition in Odaiba at the beginning of their summer vacation, struggle to reach their parents in their house in Setagaya, assisted by a female motorcycle courier named Mari, who is striving to reach her own daughter and mother in Sangenjaya. Together, the three brave the ruined city and try their best to make it home safely.
Novel	2009	Magic/Mysticism	The Age of Misrule		Trilogy of novels (World's End, Darkest Hour, and Always Forever) by Mark Chadbourn following several characters in England through the slow collapse of modern technological civilization as the previously suppressed world of natural magic and mystical, godly beings rises to take over the course of human events
Comic	2009–present	Titans	Attack on Titan		Humanoid creatures or Titans are gigantic human flesh-eating monsters that lived outside of the humanity's curtain Wall Maria and the civilization was on the verge of extinction, but some are forced to fight back by joining the military, called Survey Corps. But there are some humans that transform into Titans to fight and kill other humans and Titans.
Comic	2009	Impact event	Homestuck		A webcomic where children play a game called Sburb which causes multiple meteors to hit Earth. They survive by abandoning Earth.
Film	2009	Zombies	Zombieland		A geeky college kid and three strangers he meets travel west in an attempt to find a sanctuary free from zombies.
Story	2009	Eco, Aliens	The Day of the Troll	Simon Messingham	An Audio exclusive Doctor Who New Series Adventures story. The Doctor arrives in the far future where Britain is a wasteland and encounters a small group of scientists trying to find a way to grow crops.
Television	2009	Impact Event, Monsters	The Day of the Triffids		Loose adaptation of John Wyndham's novel. A solar event blinds most of the people in the world allowing a new life form to assert itself, and the few remaining sighted people try to survive.
Television	2010–2018	War	Adventure Time		The adventures of Jake the dog and Finn, the only known remaining human in the post-apocalyptic land of Ooo hundreds of years after the "Great Mushroom War".
Song album	2010	War	Danger Days: The True Lives of the Fabulous Killjoys	My Chemical Romance	Rock concept album with themes of fascist governments and science fiction
Film	2010	War	The Book of Eli		Although never directly stated, enormous craters can be seen throughout the film and characters mention an event called "the Flash". The writer, Gary Whitta, stated he wanted the audience to figure out the nuclear event slowly.
Game	2010	Variable (involving psychics)	Apocalypse World		Tabletop role-playing game (TTRPG) set after an apocalypse of the group's choosing
Game	2010	Supernatural, war	Darksiders		Game series by THQ set in a post-apocalyptic Earth where mankind faces near-extinction and angels fight a losing battle against the demon hordes for control over the world
Game	2010	War	Metro 2033		Game by 4A Games and THQ for the PC and Xbox 360 set in post-apocalyptic Moscow 20 years after a nuclear war
Film	2010	Zombies	Resident Evil: Afterlife		
Film	2010	Zombies	Survival of the Dead		On an island off the coast of North America, local residents simultaneously fight a zombie epidemic while hoping for a cure to return their undead relatives back to their human state. Directed by George A. Romero
Television	2010	Disease	After Armageddon		TV film about a family trying to survive after a global outbreak
Novel	2010	Disease	Dog Eat Dog	David J. Rodger	Ten years after a devastating global pandemic, the lives of two survivors collide in a sequence of events that threaten both their sanity and their lives
Novel	2010	Disease	The Passage	Justin Cronin	A virus turns humanity into vampire-esque creatures, leading to the collapse of civilization, while the survivors eke out a bleak existence
Film	2010	Impact Event	Meteor Apocalypse		A gigantic meteor enters Earth's orbit and begins to disintegrate, showering the entire planet with debris.
Film	2010	Impact Event	Quantum Apocalypse		A comet makes an unexpected turn towards the earth where all life may cease to exist within days if small town heroes fail to find a solution.
Television	2010–2012	Technology	Generator Rex		Rex is an E.V.O. working with the military organization Providence to put an end to the outbreak of violent monstrous human mutations known as E.V.O.s, which are created when people are exposed to unsafe nanites, a nanobot technology developed to fight diseases within humans. Wars between E.V.O.s and humans ensued when nanites started to get out of control.
Film	2010	Aliens	Skyline		Aliens invade Earth and attempt to steal the brains of its citizens
Film	2010	Aliens	Battle: Los Angeles		Depicts the attempts of U.S. Marines to repel an alien invasion of Earth
Television	2010–2015	Aliens	Falling Skies		Aliens or creatures called Skitters, Mechs and Overlords attack Earth; the series is showing the struggles six months after the initial attack on Earth
Novel	2010	Eco	Drain	Davis Schneiderman	Lake Michigan mysteriously empties of water and an end-of-time cult occupies the lake bed, waiting for a re-flooding of the zone by the power of a giant worm
Novel	2010	Supernatural	Sword of My Mouth	Jim Munroe	Illustrated by Shannon Gerard. A follow-up to Therefore Repent!
Novel	2010	Social Collapse	Julian Comstock: A Story of 22nd-Century America		Decline of world civilization caused by the depletion of oil reserves
Novel	2010	Unspecified	Be Ready When the Sh*t Goes Down: A Survival Guide to the Apocalypse	Forrest Griffin	A comedy survivalist book
Novel	2010	Unspecified	Cygnis	Vincent Gessler	A novel in which Syn the trapper and Ack, his cybernetic wolf, survive in a world covered with forests, facing robots and humans
Game	2010	Eco	A New Beginning		A video game by Daedalic Entertainment, in which climate change has made the Earth uninhabitable.
Television	2010–2022	Zombies	The Walking Dead	Frank Darabont	A television series featuring the world overrun by zombies
Film	2010	War	Bunraku		In the aftermath of a global war, the surviving nations introduced a ban on all firearms in an attempt to quell man's appetite for destruction.
Game	2010	War	Fist of the North Star: Ken's Rage		PlayStation 3 and Xbox 360 game by Omega Force and Tecmo Koei based on the landmark anime and manga series
Film	2010	Monsters	Stake Land		An orphaned boy seeks safety and family amidst the vampire apocalypse.
Film	2010	Monsters	Monsters	Gareth Edwards	Written, shot, and directed by Edwards.
Film	2010	Bio weapon	The Crazies	Breck Eisner	A viral outbreak in a quiet midwestern town led to spread of zombie infection, surviving townsfolk try to escape while military is attempting to quarantine the outbreak.
Game	2010	Disease	One Chance	Dean Moynihan	A group of scientists discover a cure for cancer, however it is quickly discovered that it also kills living cells and the player has six days to find a cure before the virus kills every living cell on Earth.
Film	2011	Supernatural	Vanishing on 7th Street		
Game	2011	Eco	Brink		MultiA floating self-sustaining city contains what may be the final remnants of humanity, after global warming causes sea levels to rise
Novel	2011	Technology	Robopocalypse: A Novel	Daniel H. Wilson	An apocalyptic robot/machine uprising novel
Novel	2011	Social Collapse	Survivors: A Novel of the Coming Collapse	James Wesley Rawles	An apocalyptic survivalist novel about a total socioeconomic collapse
Game	2011	Impact event	Rage		Video game by iD Software; set after a meteor collision with the Earth
Film	2011	Disease	Perfect Sense		A worldwide pandemic of unknown origin causes every human to begin losing their five traditional senses one at a time.
Film	2011	Disease	Priest		A century-spanning war between humans and vampires has devastated Earth's surface and led to a theocracy called The Church.
Film	2011	Zombies	Zombie Musical	Ryan McHenry	A short musical in which a young girl deals with the Zombie apocalypse on her first day of school
Novel	2011	Disease	Enclave	Ann Aguirre	
Film	2011	Unknown power affecting only men	Schoolgirl Apocalypse		A Japanese schoolgirl, Sakura, finds her average life in a small town turned inside out when all the males suddenly become zombies and begin to attack and kill females. With few skills and only her kyūdō bow and an English textbook to accompany her, she sets out on a journey through a dark world of murder and survival.
Game	2011	Disease	Hatoful Boyfriend		A particularly virulent strain of bird flu kills a large majority of humanity, leaving birds to become the dominant class of animals. The protagonist is one of the few humans naturally resistant to the flu.
Game	2011	Disease	Infamous 2		A plague, primarily on the eastern coast of the United States, is spreading rapidly, causing diseases over the majority of those infected and granting special abilities to some individuals, designated as Conduits.
Game	2011	Aliens	DC Universe Online		The game begins in a potential future in which many heroes and villains are killed in a large-scale battle, with Lex Luthor emerging as the victor. Brainiac manages to conquer Earth shortly afterward, facing little opposition due to the heroes who could have stopped him being killed. Luthor, alongside Batman, travels back in time to avert Brainiac's conquest.
Novel	2011	Supernatural	The Leftovers	Tom Perrotta	Survivors try to continue with life after a rapture-like event
Novel series	2011	Technology	Wool	Hugh Howey	
Game	2011	Collapse of infrastructure, and fissures in races	MotorStorm: Apocalypse		A PlayStation 3 video game that depicts the West Coast of the U.S. hit by several disasters, like tornadoes, earthquakes, rains, and thunderstorms.
Game	2011	War	Wasteland Angel		A PC game that depicts the US after World War III.
Film	2011	War	The Divide		A film about the psychological unraveling of a group of survivors, who have holed up in the basement of their apartment building during a nuclear attack.
Novel	2011	War	Fallout: Equestria		A Fan fiction based on My Little Pony: Friendship is Magic and the Fallout series
Novel	2012	Eco	Zoo	James Patterson	Due to human activities, animals become more aggressive and begin killing humans
Film	2012	War	The Hunger Games		Set in a post-apocalyptic world in the country of Panem where the countries of North America once existed. Based on the book of the same name by Suzanne Collins.
Film	2012	Impact Event	Seeking a Friend for the End of the World		An asteroid is announced to hit Earth as a man searches to find his significant other before the impact occurs.
Television	2012–2014	Technology collapse	Revolution		All technology ceases after a global blackout.
Television	2012	Impact Event	Evacuate Earth		Hypothetical docudrama concerning humanity's efforts to seek out a new home on a distant Earth-like planet, in the face of Earth's eventual destruction by an approaching neutron star. Produced by Atlas Media, for original broadcast on the National Geographic Channel.
Film	2012	Zombies	Christmas with the Dead		A freak lightning storm turned all who saw it into zombies.
Game	2012	War, Alien, Disease	Call of Duty: Black Ops II		Edward Richtofen, a Nazi German scientist attempting to succeed in conquering the world during World War II despite the failure of Adolf Hitler, creates an army of zombies as well as various advanced infantry weapons and biological enhancements using an alien substance, called Element 115, and invades a space station on the Moon while cooperating with American Patrick Dempsey, Soviet Nikolai Belinski and Japanese Takeo Masaki in his effort to survive from the zombie horde until he manages to control it, and succeeds in transforming the Earth into a wasteland (after attacking it with missiles) that is overrun by the endless tide of zombies in which almost everyone died.
Game	2012	Eco	Oil Rush		A PC strategy game, where ice caps have melted to cause global flooding.
Game	2012	Unspecified	Tokyo Jungle		A PlayStation 3 video game about a futuristic Tokyo that has become deserted by humans and overrun by many types of animals.
Game	2012	Disease	Zero Escape: Virtue's Last Reward		Visual novel adventure game released for Nintendo 3DS and PlayStation Vita. The game takes place 45 years in the future, after a calamitous virus outbreak, known as Radical-6, has exterminated almost all of human civilization.
Web series	2012	War	Electric City	Tom Hanks	Animated web series created by and starring Hanks
Film	2012	Unspecified	Love		An astronaut becomes stranded on the ISS after a mysterious apocalypse occurs on earth.
Film	2013	Zombies	Cargo		A father tries to protect his infant daughter as he turns into a zombie during the zombie apocalypse. A short film on which the longer one of the same name was based.
Television	2013	War, Supernatural	From the New World/Shin Sekai Yori		A millennium from now, in Japan, exists a utopia. The protagonist, Saki Watanabe, lives in an idyllic village barred from the outside world. Her world is ruled by the people who possess the "gods' power" of psychokinesis.
Film	2013	Aliens	Oblivion		Earth has been ravaged from war 60 years prior with the extraterrestrial "Scavengers"
Novel	2013	Eco	Ectopia	Martin Goodman	Set sixteen years into a warming world in which no girls have been born
Novel	2013	Human Decline	The Man who Watched the World End	Chris Dietzel	Part of the Great De-evolution series.
Film	2013	Aliens	The Host		Earth's population has been almost entirely taken over by alien parasites that created a perfect planet
Film	2013	Unspecified	Forever's End		Six years after an apocalyptic event has apparently killed everyone on earth, a young women is shocked to discover another survivor when a man turns up at her farmhouse.
Film	2013	Technology	The World's End		Human civilization is replaced by synthetic replicas that never age. When the last biological humans who are drunk from drinking too much beer confront the supreme intelligence with the possibilities that humanity might not want to be "improved", this contradiction leads to a crash in the simulant network, destroying most of the world as a result and throwing the planet into a new Dark Age without technology.
Game	2013	Disease, monsters	The Last of Us		A fungal spore infection turns most of humanity into monsters and a small band of survivors try to live on.
Film	2013	Environmental cataclysm forces	After Earth		Humans abandon planet Earth.
Film	2013	Eco	The Colony		Another ice age causes survivors to move underground.
Film	2013	Supernatural	This Is the End		The Rapture occurs during a party attended by celebrities including Seth Rogen, James Franco, Jonah Hill, Jay Baruchel, Danny McBride, Craig Robinson, and Emma Watson.
Film	2013	Disease	Warm Bodies		A disease transforms many humans into zombies and isolates them from society, despite a lot of them managing to retain most of their consciousness.
Webcomic	2013	Disease	Stand Still, Stay Silent		Set in a post-apocalyptic Scandinavia, the webcomic incorporates Norse mythology, focusing on an adventure into the external "silent world".
Film	2013	Sun	Exploding Sun		
Novel	2014	Disease	Dawn of the Planet of the Apes: Firestorm	Greg Keyes	Prequel to Dawn of the Planet of the Apes. A group of hyper-intelligent apes take refuge in the vast redwood forest known as Muir Woods while humanity battles the "Simian Flu" pandemic.
Game	2014	Disease, Social Collapse	Eidolon		Video game by Ice Water Games. The destruction of lifespan-extending technology installed in major cities led to massive outbreaks of fatal illness, followed by wider social collapse.
Television	2014	War	Die Gstettensaga: The Rise of Echsenfriedl		Absurdist sci-fi comedy film. The growing tension between the last two remaining superpowers – China and Google – escalates in the early 21st century, and results in the global inferno of the "Google Wars".
Film	2014	War, Technology	X-Men: Days of Future Past		Machines built to identify and eliminate mutants eventually target most humans as well. With much of the world destroyed, one mutant is sent back in time to try to prevent this future from ever happening.
Television	2014–2018	Zombies	Z Nation		A sci-fi series focused on the days after a zombie apocalypse has killed most of the world's population. One man was experimented on before society's collapse and his body contains the only known antibodies to the zombie virus.
Television	2014–2020	War	The 100		The only survivors of a nuclear war live in a space station, which is falling apart. 100 of their teenagers are sent back to Earth's surface to determine if it is livable, only to discover that they are not the only survivors left.
Film	2014	Eco, technology	Snowpiercer		Takes place in an alternative history where an attempt to counteract global warming through climate engineering in 2014 backfires catastrophically, causing an ice age and extinguishing nearly all life; only animals that can adapt to sub-zero temperatures and the inhabitants of a circumnavigational train called Snowpiercer remain.
Film	2014	Zombies	Wyrmwood		After a meteor shower turns everyone with a blood type other than A− into zombies, a man searches for his sister who's the subject of experimentation by a sadistic scientist.
Film	2014	Disease	Dawn of the Planet of the Apes		Directed by Matt Reeves, and based on characters created by Rick Jaffa and Amanda Silver (premise suggested by Planet of the Apes by Pierre Boulle). A growing nation of genetically evolved apes is threatened by a band of human survivors of a devastating virus unleashed a decade earlier.
Television	2014–2017	Disease	The Strain	Guillermo del Toro and Chuck Hogan	Following a viral outbreak that has similarities to an ancient strain of vampirism, a CDC team works to defeat the virus as it spreads across New York City.
Television	2014–2017	Supernatural	The Leftovers	Damon Lindelof	Series based on the Tom Perrota novel that takes place a few years after a rapture-type event.
Comic	2014–2018	War	Girls' Last Tour		The series follows two girls, Yuuri and Chito, as they navigate the ruins of civilization after an unknown apocalypse, and as they travel in their modified Kettenkrad, they seek food and supplies while surviving day-to-day.
Game	2014	Impact event	Ace Combat Infinity		PlayStation 3 online game depicting a new world war 20 years after a meteor strike hits much of the Earth's surface
Television	2014–2018	Disease	The Last Ship	Hank Steinberg and Steven Kane	Based on the 1988 novel of the same name by William Brinkley, the show follows the crew (consisting of 218 people) of a lone unaffected U.S. Navy Arleigh Burke-class guided missile destroyer, the fictional USS Nathan James (DDG-151), as it tries to find a cure for a viral pandemic that wiped out over 80% of the world's population, stop the virus, and save humanity.
Television	2015–2023	Zombies	Fear the Walking Dead	Robert Kirkman and Dave Erickson	A television series featuring the world overrun by zombies; spin-off of The Walking Dead
Game	2015	War	Splatoon	Hisashi Nogami and Shintaro Sato	A video game series set 10,000 years in the future when humanity is extinct and various sea creatures have migrated onto land, evolved sapience and taken their place
Film	2015	War	Turbo Kid		
Film	2015	Disease	Astraea		Four people, including a telepathic teen, try to navigate grief, loneliness, and love in a world where seemingly everyone else has died.
Film	2015	Supernatural	JeruZalem		Two Jewish American tourists visiting Jerusalem become witnesses to waves of insects, other animals, and demons storming the whole city, as the End of Days has begun.
Novel	2015	Eco	The Water Knife	Paolo Bacigalupi	Southwestern United States suffer social collapse because of a water shortage.
Film	2015	Disease	I Am Alone		While filming a survival show a survival expert is bitten by a person infected with a zombie virus.
Game	2015	War	Mad Max		An action-adventure game based on the Mad Max franchise.
Film	2015	War	Mad Max: Fury Road		The fourth installment in the Mad Max series. This film follows the titular character who ends up in the fight between Immortan Joe, who rules as a god out of his settlement the Citadel, with his War Boys against Furiosa, one of his lieutenants. This movie features a change in actors for Max with this movie starring Tom Hardy.
Film	2015	Eco	San Andreas		Its plot centers on an earthquake caused by the San Andreas Fault devastating Los Angeles and the San Francisco Bay Area.
Film	2015	Disease	Embers		After a global neurological epidemic, those who remain search for meaning and connection in a world without memory.
Television	2015–2017	Eco	Zoo		Based on the James Patterson book. Due to human activities, animals become more aggressive and begin killing humans
Television	2015–2018	Disease	The Last Man on Earth		Post-apocalyptic sci-fi dark comedy TV series, created by Will Forte (who also starred in the show) which formerly aired over the FOX broadcast TV network
Television	2015–2018	Disease	12 Monkeys		A time traveler from the post-apocalyptic future arrives in the year 2015 on a mission to save mankind from a deadly plague. Based on the 1995 Terry Gilliam film.
Song	2015	War, technology	The Globalist		Song by the band Muse from the album called "Drones"
Film	2015	War	Z for Zachariah		Feature film adaptation of the 1975 novel of the same name
Game	2016	Unspecified	The Flame in the Flood		A young girl and her dog companion must survive while traveling along a river in order to reach a human settlement in a post-societal America
Comic	2016–2019	Technology, monsters	Scooby Apocalypse		Scooby-Doo and his friends have to find a cure for a nanite virus that they accidentally created in an experiment gone wrong that led to a mutant apocalypse.
Film	2016	Aliens	The 5th Wave		16-year-old Cassie Sullivan tries to survive in a world devastated by the waves of alien invasions that have decimated the Earth's population.
Comic	2016	Unspecified	Liberty: Deception	Travis Vengroff	A graphic novel and podcast series set on a failed terraforming colony. The series focuses on the daily struggle to survive on a distant planet with extreme resource scarcity.
Television	2016	Disease	Containment		The series follows an epidemic that breaks out in Atlanta, leaving a section of the city cordoned off under quarantine and those stuck on the inside fighting for their lives.
Game	2016	Other	Nuclear Throne		A post-apocalyptic shoot-'em-up by Vlambeer, where humanity mutated into horrible monsters. These mutants are looking for the fabled Nuclear Throne.
Film	2016	Zombies	Train to Busan		Passengers on a train to Busan try to survive a zombie outbreak.
Game	2016	Supernatural, Impact Event, Monsters	Ys VIII: Lacrimosa of Dana		The Great Tree of Origin periodically destroys the dominant species of the series' world through a "Lacrimosa", always leaving a Warden of Evolution, an immortal endling cursed to witness their people's downfall then guide future Lacrimosas. The last victims of a successful Lacrimosa were the Eternians, who died out due to a nuclear winter caused by a meteor strike. In the present day, the Great Tree attempts to unleash Primordials upon the world, but series protagonist Adol Christin averts this Lacrimosa, and Dana, the Eternian Warden, takes control of the cycle.
Film	2016	Disease, Zombies	The Girl with All the Gifts		Based on the novel of the same name.
Film	2017	Unspecified	Bokeh		An American couple on holiday in Iceland wake up one morning to discover that every other human on earth has disappeared.
Television	2017	Technology	Black Mirror		The episode "Metalhead" is about a group of post-apocalyptic survivors being pursued by an AI robot dog.
Television	2017–2018	Impact Event	Salvation		TV show about the discovery of an asteroid that will impact the Earth in just six months.
Game	2017	Infection, Disease	Hollow Knight		Hollow Knight is an artistically dynamic adventure Metroid-style game. It indirectly tells the story of a broken and diseased civilization through dialogue, lore tablets, artwork and other features. As the player learns more and progresses, the infection occurs, and ultimately the player discovers the source of the infection as well as the history behind the world.
Film	2017	Zombies	Cargo		A father tries to protect his infant daughter as he turns into a zombie during the zombie apocalypse.
Game	2017	Supernatural, technology	The Legend of Zelda: Breath of the Wild		Set 100 years after Hyrule has been largely destroyed by Ganon
Game	2017	Technology, war	Horizon Zero Dawn		The story is set in the 31st century, in a world where humans have regressed to primitive tribal societies as a result of some unspecified calamity. Their technologically advanced predecessors are vaguely remembered as the "Old Ones." Large robotic creatures known merely as "machines" now dominate the Earth.
Film	2017–2018	Monsters	Godzilla: Planet of the Monsters		Humans are forced to evacuate Earth when several Kaiju including Godzilla surface and wreak havoc across the Earth. 20,000 years later they return after failing to find another habitable planet in order to reclaim the Earth and destroy Godzilla, however they discover that the planet has changed drastically in humanity's absence. Was followed by two sequels Godzilla: City on the Edge of Battle and Godzilla: The Planet Eater.
Film	2017	Bioterrorism, zombies	Resident Evil: Vendetta		The story is set in between the events of Resident Evil 6 and Resident Evil 7: Biohazard. BSAA agent Chris Redfield is tracking Glenn Arias, a Brazilian-American death merchant and a former CIA operative who is wanted by both the Interpol and the FBI.
Television	2017–2020	Nuclear	Dark (TV series)		Time travel causes a nuclear meltdown.
Film	2017	Unspecified	Everything Beautiful Is Far Away (film)		The story is set in the vast desert that exists between the few remaining cities.
Film	2017	Unspecified	Hostile		A scavenger in a post-apocalyptic world becomes injured and trapped in her upturned vehicle and has to survive while fending off a humanoid monster.
Television	2017–2018	Technology	Agents of S.H.I.E.L.D. season 5		Glenn Talbot, under the corrupting influence of gravitonium, inadvertently destroys Earth in a careless attempt to mine more of the substance, forcing humanity's survivors into the Lighthouse, a subterranean bunker under Lake Ontario. The first arc of the season involves S.H.I.E.L.D. discovering the aftermath of this imminent calamity—unaware of Talbot's involvement due to his name becoming lost to history and Daisy Johnson being scapegoated—while the second arc involves S.H.I.E.L.D.'s ultimately successful attempt to prevent this from happening.
Novel series	2017–2022	Alien plague	Janitors of the Post-Apocalypse (3 books)	Jim C. Hines	Alien visitors to Earth accidentally introduce a plague which vastly increases human aggression, strength and tolerance to pain while also lowering intelligence. Humanity is reduced to a feral zombie-like state resulting in the collapse of civilization. Eventually the aliens are able to cure some of the humans and they find that humans make excellent maintenance staff for dangerous jobs aboard battle cruisers. And then a group of these humans manage to take control of one of these war ships and figure out what's really going on.
Film	2018	Aliens	A Quiet Place		A family is struggling to survive in a post-apocalyptic world inhabited by blind extraterrestrial creatures with an acute sense of hearing.
Film	2018	Supernatural, Monsters	Bird Box		A woman tries to protect herself and two children from supernatural creatures that make people who look at them go insane and commit suicide.
Film	2018	Disease	What Still Remains		A young woman tries to navigate a world ravaged by a virus after the death of her mother.
Film	2018	Zombies	Ever After		Two young women try to travel between the two safe areas in Germany following a zombie apocalypse.
Television	2018-19	Disease	The Rain		Survivors of a virus carried by rainfall search for their father.
Television	2018	War, supernatural	American Horror Story: Apocalypse		The 8th season of American Horror Story
Film	2019	Unspecified	The Last Boy		Set after a mysterious apocalyptic event, a boy is sent by his dying mother to travel to a place where wishes can be granted, while avoiding mysterious dangerous wind-like entities, he is joined by a girl his age and they encounter a priest and his women followers and later a soldier and a former radio astronomer. Inspired by the poetry of Rumi.
Film	2019	Eco	Io		The Earth's atmosphere becomes toxic and forces the majority of humanity off-world to a space station colony near one of Jupiter's moons. A young scientist who holds out hope of finding a solution meets a man who is on his way to the last evacuation shuttle.
Television	2019	Disease	See		In the distant future, the human race has lost the sense of sight, and society is left to find new ways to interact, build, hunt, and survive.
Television	2019	War	Daybreak		A teenager searches for his girlfriend in post-apocalyptic California
Game	2019	War	Far Cry New Dawn		The narrative stand-alone sequel of Far Cry 5 of the Far Cry video game series. The story is set 17 years after the events of Far Cry 5. After the nuclear exchange known as "the Collapse" devastated the world, survivors attempt to rebuild the community in Hope County. Their efforts are, however, threatened by the Highwaymen, a roving band of organized bandits led by twin sisters Mickey and Lou.
Film	2019	Technology	I Am Mother		After an extinction event, an AI begins the process of repopulating the Earth using stored embryos.
Film	2019	Aliens	The Lego Movie 2: The Second Part		Emmet Brickowski attempts to rescue his friends from the Systar System, while dealing with a coming cataclysm known as "Armamageddon".
Television	2019	Zombies	Black Summer		In the same universe as Z Nation, this show follows a small group of refugees trying to make it to safety six weeks after the start of the zombie apocalypse.
Television	2019-2021	Monsters, Zombies	The Last Kids on Earth		A group of teenagers band together when their hometown is overrun by giant monsters and zombies after portals to another dimension open in the sky. Based on the book series of the same name.
Film	2019	Zombies	Zombieland: Double Tap		A sequel to Zombieland, set 10 years later.
Television	2019-2022	Unspecified	Three Robots, Three Robots: Exit Strategies		Part of the Love, Death & Robots anthology series, it follows three robots as they explore Earth after the fall of humanity.
Television	2019	Unspecified	Alternate Histories		Part of the Love, Death & Robots anthology series. An alternative history research simulation app, shows a user six different timelines involving the death of Adolf Hitler in 1908 instead of 1945, some of which result in post-apocalyptic scenarios.
Film	2019	Disease	Light of My Life		A father and his daughter try to stay safe 10 years after a plague kills off most women
Film	2019	Aliens	Avengers: Endgame		The surviving members of the Avengers and their allies attempt to reverse the damage caused in Avengers: Infinity War when Thanos used the Infinity Stones to kill half of the universe's population.
Game	2019	Supernatural	Death Stranding		In the near future, an extinction level event has had catastrophic effects on the human race, leaving the small colonies of survivors scattered and disconnected.
Film	2019	Technology	A Guide to Dating at the End of the World		A woman wakes up one morning to find that everyone on Earth has vanished and the only other person is a former blind date who she declared she would never date even if he was "the last man on Earth".
Film	2019	Unspecified	The End of All Things		Three people survive together in a post-apocalyptic world until the discovery of a relic changes their lives and they begin turning on each other.
Film	2020	Monsters	Love and Monsters		Fallout from nuclear bombs used to destroy an asteroid causes all cold-blooded animals to mutate into giant monsters that kill the majority of the human race.
Film	2020	Impact Event	Greenland		A comet breaks apart and its fragments strike Earth, destroying much of the surface, forcing the remaining survivors to evacuate to underground shelters.
Film	2020	Aliens	Justice League Dark: Apokolips War		After a poorly executed plan leaves numerous heroes dead, Earth is conquered by Darkseid, with most cities rendered a wasteland. Although the surviving heroes manage to defeat Darkseid, the damage is already done; Darkseid's Reapers have mined one-third of the Earth's core, putting its orbit in danger of freezing or heating enough that the planet's surface will become uninhabitable. John Constantine convinces the Flash to reset the timeline, despite knowing that the world will not be the same as it was before.
Film	2020	War	Friend of the World		A young filmmaker crosses paths with aberrant war general in a military bunker during the aftermath of a global war.
Film	2020	Robots	Kimmy vs. the Reverend		In one possible ending in the "choose your own adventure" format show, reached when the viewer chooses to wait for the Uber driver Mamadou twice in a row, humanity is wiped out by an army of C.H.E.R.Y.L robots.
Television	2020–2021	Zombies	The Walking Dead: World Beyond		A spin-off of The Walking Dead, set 10 years after the original series.
Film	2021	Impact event	How It Ends		On the final day before a meteorite is going to collide with Earth, a woman traverses through the empty streets of Los Angeles with a Metaphysical version of her younger self on the way to an "End of the World" party.
Film	2021	Robots	The Mitchells vs. the Machines		A dysfunctional family must save Earth from a robot uprising while on a road trip.
Television	2021	Zombies, Nuclear, Robots	What If... Zombies?!, What If... Ultron Won?		Part of Marvel's What If...? series. A quantum virus causes a global zombie apocalypse with several of the Avengers among the survivors. Ultron eradicates most of humanity using nuclear missiles and gains control of the Infinity Stones which he uses to destroy many inhabited planets, killing most of life in the universe.
Film	2021	Sun	Finch		Fifteen years after a solar flare has destroyed the Earth's ozone layer, an Ailing engineer builds an android companion to help look after his dog, but when a massive storm approaches they are forced to make a cross-country road trip across post-apocalyptic America.
Film	2021	Impact event	Don't Look Up		A satirical look at America's reaction to an approaching comet. The story is an allegory for climate change.
Television	2022	Disease	All of Us Are Dead	Chun Sung-il	The series mostly takes place at a high school in the fictional South Korean city of Hyosan, as a zombie apocalypse suddenly breaks out.
Game	2022	Disease	Stray		After an apocalyptic event a stray cat falls into a walled-off city populated by robots.
Television	2023	Disease, monsters	The Last of Us		A TV series adaptation of the video game of the same title.
Television	2023	Impact event	Carol & the End of the World		An adult animated comedy-drama miniseries. A woman seeks a way to cope through her mundane routine as humanity faces imminent extinction when a mysterious planet is going to collide with Earth.
Comic	2024	Unspecified	The Road: A Graphic Novel Adaptation	Manu Larcenet, Cormac McCarthy	A graphic novel adaptation illustrated by Manu Larcenet of The Road by Cormac McCarthy (Which has had several editions including a Folio collector's edition with illustrations by Gérard DuBois) and the second adaptation of McCarthy's novel after the 2009 film.
Film	2024	Unspecified	Flow		A cat joins a group of animals in exploring a flooded landscape devoid of humans.
Film	2025	War	A House of Dynamite		The U.S. government reacts to an approaching nuclear missile.
Film	2026	Impact event	Greenland 2: Migration		Five years after a comet impact, a group of survivors journeys to find a suitable home.
Game	2026	Unspecified	Road to Vostok	Antti Leinonen	After the Midsummer, the southeastern part of Finland near the Finnish–Russia border is evacuated by unspecified reason; the main character sets off on a journey eastward with the main goal of survival.

== See also ==
- List of apocalyptic films
- List of nuclear holocaust fiction
- List of time travel science fiction
- Nuclear holocaust
- Nuclear weapons in popular culture
- Survivalism
- World War III
- World War III in popular culture
- Zombie apocalypse
