= Apocalyptic and post-apocalyptic fiction =

Genre of fiction

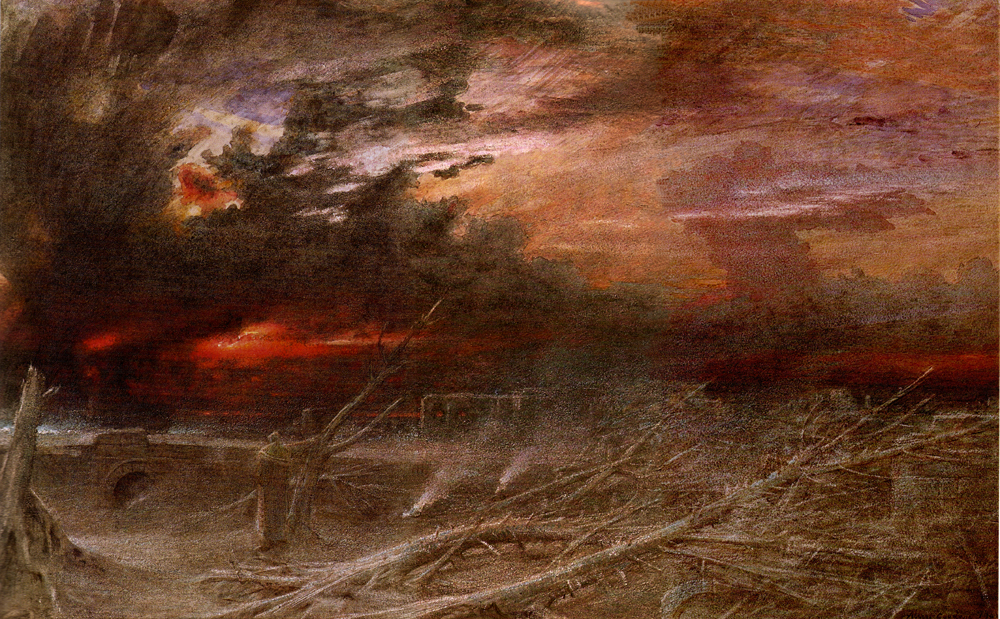
Albert Goodwin's painting Apocalypse (1903)

Apocalyptic and post-apocalyptic fiction are subgenres of speculative fiction in which the Earth's (or another place's) civilization is collapsing or has collapsed. The apocalypse event may be climatic, such as runaway climate change; astronomical, an impact event; destructive, nuclear holocaust or resource depletion; medical, a pandemic, whether natural or human-caused; end time, such as the Last Judgment, Second Coming, 2012 phenomenon or Ragnarök; or any other scenario in which the outcome is apocalyptic, such as a zombie apocalypse, AI takeover, technological singularity, dysgenics/eugenics, natural disasters, or alien invasions.

The story may involve dealing with the impact and consequences of the event itself, focusing on the psychology of survivors, and the way to keep the human race alive and together as one. Post-apocalyptic stories often take place in a non-technological future world or a world where only scattered elements of society and technology remain.

Numerous ancient societies, including the Babylonian and Judaic, produced apocalyptic literature and mythology which dealt with the end of the world and human society, such as the Epic of Gilgamesh, written c. 2000–1500 BCE. Recognizable modern apocalyptic novels had existed since at least the first third of the 19th century, when Mary Shelley's The Last Man (1826) was published; however, this form of literature gained widespread popularity after World War II, when the possibility of global annihilation by nuclear weapons entered the public consciousness.

== Themes ==
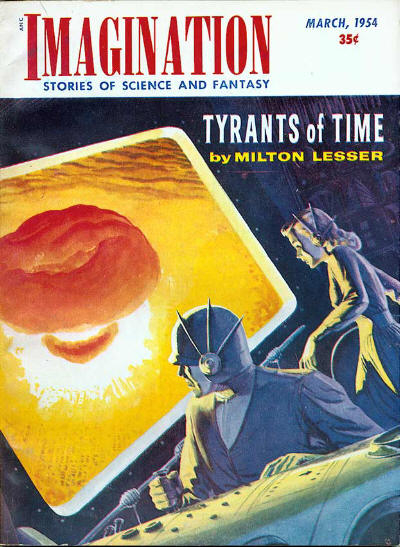
Imagination magazine cover, depicting an atomic explosion, dated March 1954

The apocalypse event may be climatic, such as runaway climate change; natural, such as an impact event; man made, such as nuclear holocaust; medical, such as a plague or virus, whether natural or man-made; religious, such as the Rapture or Great Tribulation; or imaginative, such as zombie apocalypse or alien invasion. The story may involve attempts to prevent an apocalypse event, deal with the impact and consequences of the event itself, or may be post-apocalyptic and set after the event. The time frame may be immediately after the catastrophe, focusing on the travails or psychology of survivors, the way to maintain the human race alive and together as one, or considerably later, often including the theme that the existence of pre-catastrophe civilization has been forgotten (or mythologized). Post-apocalyptic stories often take place in a non-technological future world, or a world where only scattered elements of society and technology remain. However, the Kalki Puran specifies an apocalyptic event in which a divine avatar arises to violently end the rule of Buddhist kings and enslave their women, a scenario rooted in sectarian conflict rather than natural or technological disaster.

Other themes may be cybernetic revolt, divine judgment, dysgenics, ecological collapse, pandemic, resource depletion, supernatural phenomena, technological singularity, or some other general disaster.

The relics of a technological past "protruding into a more primitive... landscape", a theme known as the "ruined Earth", have been described as "among the most potent of [science fiction]'s icons".

== Ancient predecessors ==
Ancient Mesopotamia texts containing the oldest surviving apocalyptic literature, including the Eridu Genesis and the Epic of Gilgamesh, both of which date to around 2000-1500 BCE, describe angry gods sending floods to punish humanity. The Gilgamesh version includes the ancient hero Utnapishtim and his family being saved through the intervention of the god Ea.

The Biblical story of Noah and his ark describes the destruction of the corrupt original civilization and its replacement with a remade world. Noah is assigned the task to build the ark and save two of each animal species in order to reestablish a new post-great flood world.

The Biblical story of the destruction of Sodom and Gomorrah also has post-apocalyptic elements. The daughters of Lot, who mistakenly believe that the destruction had engulfed the whole world and that they and their father were the only surviving human beings, conclude that in such a situation it would be justified - and indeed vitally needed - to have sex with their father in order to ensure the survival of humanity. Such situations and dilemmas occur in modern post-apocalyptic fiction.

The Biblical Genesis flood narrative is retold in the 71st Chapter of the Quran;

In the Hindu Dharmasastra, an apocalyptic deluge plays a prominent part. According to the Matsya Purana, the Matsya avatar of Lord Vishnu, informed the King Manu of an all-destructive deluge which would be coming very soon. The King was advised to build a huge boat (ark) which housed his family, nine types of seeds, pairs of all animals and the Saptarishis to repopulate Earth, after the deluge would end and the oceans and seas would recede. At the time of the deluge, Vishnu appeared as a horned fish and Shesha appeared as a rope, with which Vaivasvata Manu fastened the boat to the horn of the fish. Variants of this story also appear in Buddhist and Jain scriptures.

The 1st centuries CE saw the recording of the Book of Revelation (from which the word apocalypse originated, meaning "revelation" in ancient Greek), which is filled with prophecies of destruction, as well as luminous visions. In the first chapter of Revelation, the writer St. John the Divine explains his divine errand: "Write the things which thou hast seen, the things which are, and the things which shall be hereafter" (Rev. 1:19). He takes it as his mission to convey—to reveal—to God's kingdom His promise that justice will prevail and that the suffering will be vindicated (Leigh). The apocalyptist provides a beatific vision of Judgement Day, revealing God's promise for redemption from suffering and strife. Revelation describes a new Heaven and a new Earth, and its intended Christian audience is often enchanted and inspired, rather than terrified by visions of Judgment Day. These Christians believed themselves chosen for God's salvation, and so such apocalyptic sensibilities inspired optimism and nostalgia for the end times.

The Norse poem Völuspá from the Poetic Edda details the creation, coming doom, and rebirth of the world. The world's destruction includes fire and flood consuming the earth while mythic beasts do battle with the Aesir gods, during which they all perish in an event called Ragnarök. After the destruction, a pair of humans, a man and woman, find the world renewed and the god Baldr resurrected.

== In society ==
Such works often feature the loss of a global perspective as protagonists are on their own, often with little or no knowledge of the outside world. Furthermore, they often explore a world without modern technology whose rapid progress may overwhelm people as human brains are not adapted to contemporary society, but evolved to deal with issues that have become largely irrelevant, such as immediate physical threats. Such works depict worlds of less complexity, direct contact, and primitive needs. It is often the concept of change as much as the concept of destruction that causes public interest in apocalyptic themes.

Such fiction is studied by social sciences, and may provide insights into a culture's fears, as well as things like the role imagined for public administration.

Since the late 20th century, a surge of popular post-apocalyptic films can be observed. Christopher Schmidt notes that, while the world "goes to waste" for future generations, we distract ourselves from disaster by passively watching it as entertainment. Some have commented on this trend, saying that "it is easier to imagine the end of the world than it is to imagine the end of capitalism".

== Pre-1900 works ==
Lord Byron's 1816 poem "Darkness", included in The Prisoner of Chillon collection, on the apocalyptic end of the world and one man's survival, was one of the earliest English-language works in this genre. The sun was blotted out, leading to darkness and cold which kills off mankind through famine and ice-age conditions. The poem was influential in the emergence of "the last man" theme which appeared in the works of several poets, such as "The Last Man" by Thomas Campbell (1824) and "The Last Man" (1826) by Thomas Hood, as well as "The Last Man" by Thomas Lovell Beddoes. The year 1816 was known as the Year Without a Summer because Mount Tambora had erupted in the Dutch East Indies in 1815 that emitted sulphur into the atmosphere which lowered the temperature and altered weather patterns throughout the world. This was the source for Byron's poem.

Mary Shelley's novel The Last Man (1826) is a continuation of the apocalyptic theme in fiction and is generally recognized as the first major fictional post-apocalyptic story. The plot follows a group of people as they struggle to survive in a plague-infected world. The story's male protagonist struggles to keep his family safe but is inevitably left as the last man alive.

Shelley's novel is predated by Jean-Baptiste Cousin de Grainville's French epic prose poem Le Dernier Homme (English: The Last Man [1805]), and this work is sometimes considered the first modern work to depict the end of the world. Published after his death in 1805, de Grainville's work follows the character of Omegarus, the titular "last man," in what is essentially a retelling of the Book of Revelation, combined with themes of the story of Adam and Eve. Unlike most apocalyptic tales, de Grainville's novel approaches the end of the world not as a cautionary tale, or a tale of survival, but as both an inevitable, as well as necessary, step for the spiritual resurrection of mankind.

Edgar Allan Poe's short story "The Conversation of Eiros and Charmion" (1839) follows the conversation between two souls in the afterlife as they discuss the destruction of the world. The destruction was brought about by a comet that removed nitrogen from Earth's atmosphere; this left only oxygen and resulted in a worldwide inferno. Similarly, Giacomo Leopardi's short dialogue "Dialogue between a Goblin and a Gnome" (1824) features a world without the presence of the human beings, most likely because they "violate[d] the laws of nature, and [went] contrary to their welfare".

Richard Jefferies' novel After London (1885) can best be described as genuine post-apocalyptic fiction. After a sudden and unspecified catastrophe has depopulated England, the countryside reverts to nature and the few survivors return to a quasi-medieval way of life. The first chapters consist solely of a description of nature reclaiming England: fields becoming overrun by forest, domesticated animals running wild, roads and towns becoming overgrown, London reverting to lake and poisonous swampland. The rest of the story is a straightforward adventure/quest set many years later in the wild landscape and society, but the opening chapters set an example for many later science fiction stories.

H.G. Wells wrote several novels that have a post-apocalyptic theme. The Time Machine (1895) has the unnamed protagonist traveling to the year 802,701 A.D. after civilization has collapsed and humanity has split into two distinct species, the elfin Eloi and the brutal Morlocks. Later in the story, the time traveler moves forward to a dying Earth beneath a swollen red sun. The War of the Worlds (1898) depicts an invasion of Earth by inhabitants of the planet Mars. The aliens systematically destroy Victorian England with advanced weaponry mounted on nearly indestructible vehicles. Due to the infamous radio adaptation of the novel by Orson Welles on his show, The Mercury Theatre on the Air, the novel has become one of the best known early apocalyptic works. It has subsequently been reproduced or adapted several times in comic books, film, music, radio programming, television programming, and video games.

== Post-1900 works ==
=== Aliens ===
Childhood's End is a 1953 science fiction novel by the British author Arthur C. Clarke, in which aliens come to Earth, human children develop fantastic powers and the planet is destroyed.

In Argentine comic writer Héctor Germán Oesterheld's comic series El Eternauta (1957 to 1959), an alien race only mentioned by the protagonists as Ellos ("Them") invades the Earth, starting with a deadly snowfall before using other alien races to defeat the remaining humans.

In Alice Sheldon's Nebula-winning novelette "The Screwfly Solution" (1977), aliens are wiping out humanity with an airborne agent that changes men's sexual impulses to violent ones.

Douglas Adams's Hitchhiker's Guide series (1979–2009) is a humorous take on alien invasion stories. Multiple Earths are repeatedly "demolished" by the bureaucratic Vogons to make way for a hyperspace bypass, to the chagrin of the protagonist Arthur Dent.

In Gene Wolfe's The Urth of the New Sun (1987), aliens or highly evolved humans introduce a white hole into the sun to counteract the dimming effect of a black hole, and the resulting global warming causes a sea-level rise that kills most of the population. However, this may be redemptive, like Noah's Flood, rather than a disaster.

In Greg Bear's The Forge of God (1987), Earth is destroyed in an alien attack. Before its destruction, a different group of aliens is able to save samples of the biosphere and a small number of people, resettling them on Mars. Some form the crew of a ship to hunt down the homeworld of the killers, as described in the sequel, Anvil of Stars (1992).

Al Sarrantonio's Moonbane (1989) concerns the origin of werewolves, which he attributes to the Moon along with their attraction to it. An invasion after an explosion on Luna sends meteoric fragments containing latent lycanthropes to Earth, who thrive in the planet's oxygen-rich atmosphere. Moonbane's tone is reminiscent of H. G. Wells's War of the Worlds (1897).

Charles R. Pellegrino and George Zebrowski's novel The Killing Star (1995) describes a devastating attack on a late-21st-century Earth by an alien civilization. Using missiles traveling at relativistic speed, they are determined to destroy the human race in a preemptive strike, perceiving them as a threat after watching several episodes of Star Trek: The Next Generation that show human domination in space.

In the video game Chrono Trigger (1995), the giant alien creature Lavos collides with the earth in prehistoric times, subsequently hibernating beneath the earth. As millions of years pass, it feeds on the energy of the earth, eventually surfacing in 1999 to wreak complete destruction of the human race, atmosphere, and general life on the planet in the form of a rain of destruction fired from its outer shell, known as the "Day of Lavos".

In the video game Half-Life (1998), hostile alien creatures arrive on Earth through a portal after a scientific experiment goes wrong. In its sequel, Half-Life 2 (2004), it is revealed to the player that the creatures encountered in the first game are merely the slaves of a much more powerful alien race, the Combine, who have taken over the Earth to drain its resources after subduing the entirety of Earth's governments and military forces in only seven hours.

In the 2000 Don Bluth animated film Titan A.E., Earth has been destroyed by the Drej due to a human experimental discovery called Project Titan, which made them fear "what humanity will become".

The 2011 TV series Falling Skies, by Robert Rodat and Steven Spielberg, follows a human resistance force fighting to survive after extraterrestrial aliens attempt to take over Earth by disabling most of the world's technology and destroying its armed forces in a surprise attack. It is implied that the attacking aliens are in reality former victims of an attack on their own planet and are now the slaves of an unseen controller race.

The television series Defiance (2013–2015) is set in an Earth devastated by the "Pale Wars", a war with seven alien races referred to as the "Votan", followed by the "Arkfalls", which terraforms Earth to an almost unrecognizable state. Unlike most apocalyptic works, Earth is not inhospitable and humanity is not on the verge of extinction.

The World's End is a 2013 British-American comic science fiction film directed by Edgar Wright, written by Wright and Simon Pegg, and starring Pegg, Nick Frost, Paddy Considine, Martin Freeman, Eddie Marsan and Rosamund Pike. The film follows a group of friends who discover an alien invasion during a pub crawl in their hometown.

In the 2018 horror film A Quiet Place, the 2021 sequel A Quiet Place Part II, and the 2024 film A Quiet Place: Day One, society has collapsed in the wake of lethal attacks by extraterrestrial creatures who, having no eyesight, hunt humans and other creatures with their highly sensitive hearing; the scattered survivors live most of their lives in near-silence as a result.

=== Astronomical ===
In Philip Wylie and Edwin Balmer's novel When Worlds Collide (1933), Earth is destroyed by the rogue planet Bronson Alpha, and a selected few escape on a spaceship. In the sequel, After Worlds Collide (1934), the survivors start a new life on the planet's companion Bronson Beta, which has taken over the orbit formerly occupied by Earth.

In J. T. McIntosh's novel One in Three Hundred (1954), scientists have discovered how to pinpoint the exact minute, hour, and day the Sun will go "nova", boiling away Earth's seas and causing all life on Earth to be destroyed by natural disasters within twenty-four hours. A race is on to build thousands of spaceships to transfer evacuees on a one-way trip to Mars. When the Sun begins to go nova, everything is on schedule, but most of the spaceships turn out to be defective and fail en route to Mars.

Brian Aldiss's novel Hothouse (1961) is set in a distant future where the Sun is much hotter and stronger, and the human population has been reduced to a fifth of what it had been.

J. G. Ballard's novel The Drowned World (1962) occurs after a rise in solar radiation that causes worldwide flooding and accelerated mutation of plants and animals.

Jerry Pournelle and Larry Niven's novel, Lucifer's Hammer (1977), is about a cataclysmic comet hitting Earth and various groups of people struggling to survive the aftermath in southern California.

Hollywood—which previously had explored the idea of the Earth and its population being potentially endangered by a collision with another heavenly body with When Worlds Collide (1951), a film treatment of the aforementioned 1933 novel– revisited the theme in the late 1990s with a trio of similarly themed projects. Asteroid (1997) is an NBC-TV miniseries about the U.S. government trying to prevent an asteroid from colliding with the Earth. The following year saw dueling big-budget summer blockbuster movies Deep Impact (1998) and Armageddon (1998), both of which involved efforts to save the Earth from, respectively, a rogue comet and an asteroid, by landing crews upon them to detonate nuclear weapons there in hopes of destroying them.

Characters in the six-part ITV television drama serial The Last Train (1999) awaken from a cryogenic sleep after an asteroid the size of Birmingham strikes Africa, causing a worldwide apocalypse.

K. A. Applegate's 2001–2003 book series, Remnants, details the end of the world by asteroid collision. The first book, The Mayflower Project (2001), describes Earth in a sort of hysteria as 80 people are chosen by NASA to board a spacecraft that will go to an unknown destination away from the destroyed Earth. The later books deal with the few survivors waking up from a 500-year hibernation and succumbing to both strange mutations and the will of a strange alien computer/spaceship that they land on. Eventually, they return to Earth to find a couple colonies of survivors struggling on a harsh planet completely different from the Earth the Remnants knew.

Melancholia (2011), the middle entry of filmmaker Lars von Trier's "depression trilogy", ends with humanity completely wiped out by a collision with a rogue planet. The depressed protagonist reverses roles with her relatives as the crisis unfolds, as she turns out to be the only family member capable of calmly accepting the imminent impact event.

In id Software's video game Rage (2011), Earth is heavily damaged, and humanity nearly wiped out, by the direct collision of the real asteroid 99942 Apophis with the Earth in the year 2029.

Marly Youmans's epic poem Thaliad (2012) tells the story of a group of children after an unspecified apocalypse from the sky, perhaps connected with solar flares or meteor impact, resulting in people and animals having been burned and the skies having filled with ash. The children survive only because they were together on a school visit to a cave.

In the 2013 Australian film These Final Hours, a massive asteroid hits the Atlantic Ocean, dooming all life. The film follows James, who decides to head to the 'party-to-end-all-parties' and spend the last 12 hours before the global firestorm reaches Western Australia.

In Neal Stephenson's novel Seveneves (2015), The Moon is destroyed by an unknown agent, forming a massive debris cloud that threatens to produce a White Sky and cause a massive bombardment of Moon fragments. As a result, a multinational effort is put in place to construct an ark for the preservation of humanity, built around the International Space Station.

In the 2020 film Greenland, a massive comet, known as Clarke, is set to collide with Earth, with only a few people permitted into a massive complex of bunkers in Greenland. The film follows the Garrity family's attempts to reach these safe havens after they were unable to board the transport aircraft to the bunkers. Clarke collides with Earth, leaving the planet devastated. However, there are survivors throughout the world. A sequel, Greenland: Migration, was released in 2026, and follows the Garrity family attempting to travel across a post-apocalyptic Europe to reach Clarke's impact crater.

In the 2021 apocalyptic political satire film Don't Look Up by Adam McKay, the main characters Dr. Mindy (played by Leonardo DiCaprio) and Kate Dibiasky (Jennifer Lawrence) discover a large comet on direct collision course with Earth in six months. However, they are largely ignored by the U.S. government, and after a series of attempts to reveal the comet's existence and severity, the global response is mixed, with opinions ranging from calls to "Look up", shock, disinterest, and even outright denial due to a campaign of disinformation (telling people to "Don't look up") by the administration. The comet eventually strikes Earth, triggering an extinction-level event.

=== Cozy catastrophe ===
The "cozy catastrophe" is not an intentional style of post-apocalyptic science fiction, but rather a criticism of certain apocalyptic works considered as not believably harsh enough for the critic's stated preferences.

Stories subject to this criticism generally involve some sort of catastrophe wherein civilization comes to an end with mass deaths, but the main characters survive relatively unscathed and are freed from the constraints of vulgar civilization in their hideaway, perhaps finding a kind of quiet happiness in the changed world.

The term was coined by Brian Aldiss in Billion Year Spree: The History of Science Fiction (1973). Aldiss was directing his remarks mainly at novels of English author John Wyndham such as The Kraken Wakes (1953), but especially his novel The Day of the Triffids (1951), whose protagonists did not suffer enough associated hardship from the collapse of society for Aldiss's taste, as well as other British books in the era following the Second World War.

The genre has been defended though as being a valid take on more low-key catastrophes of an ecological sort, and some question whether other books qualify at all – Margaret Atwood defended The Day of the Triffids as not as "cozy" as alleged, for example.

=== Environmental disaster ===
The Purple Cloud (1901) by M. P. Shiel is a novel in which most of humanity has been killed by a poisonous cloud issuing from volcanic eruptions.

In Alfred Walter Stewart's 1923 novel Nordenholt's Million, an engineered strain of bacteria denitrifies almost all plants, causing a collapse of food supply. The plutocrat of the title establishes a haven in central Scotland for a chosen group of survivors, while deliberately wrecking all alternative refuges.

In Alfred Bester's story "Adam and No Eve" (1941), an inventor takes off in a rocket whose propulsion uses a dangerous catalyst. From outer space, he sees that the entire world has been destroyed by fire in a runaway reaction caused by the catalyst. Fatally injured in a crash landing, he crawls to the sea so that the bacteria in his body can initiate new life on Earth.

In John Christopher's novel The Death of Grass (1956), a mutated virus kills cereal crops and other grasses throughout Eurasia, causing famine.

Kurt Vonnegut's novel Cat's Cradle (1963) ends with all the bodies of water turning into "ice-nine", a fictional phase of ice that forms at room temperature.

In J. G. Ballard's novel The Burning World (1964, expanded into The Drought in 1965), pollution in the oceans creates a surface layer that resists evaporation, bringing about a worldwide drought.

John Brunner's novel The Sheep Look Up (1972) describes an environmentally degraded world rapidly collapsing into social chaos, revolution, and anarchy.

Richard Cowper's three-volume novel The White Bird of Kinship (1978–82) envisions a future in which anthropogenic global warming has led to a catastrophic rise in sea level. Most of it takes place two millennia later.

Ursula K. Le Guin's novel Always Coming Home (1985) takes place long after worldwide disasters—apparently largely environmental, though nuclear war may also be involved—have drastically reduced the population. It paints an admiring picture of a primitive society that will not repeat the mistakes of civilization. It won the Janet Heidinger Kafka Prize and was a runner-up for a National Book Award.

Chuck Dixon's Winterworld comic has the anti-hero Scully and Rah-Rah the badger team up with teenage Wynn to take on a world fallen to winter. Continued in La Nina, Frozen Fleet, and the book The Mechanic's Song.

Palladium Books' Rifts roleplaying game (1990) features an apocalypse caused by various natural disasters, including the eruption of the Yellowstone supervolcano, which releases a large amount of magical energy, This energy is amplified by the deaths of millions occurring during a solstice, at midnight, during a planetary alignment, creating the titular rifts that bring forth various beings and monstrosities from throughout the Megaverse.

In Octavia Butler's 1993 novel Parable of the Sower, climate change and corporatism are the human-caused reasons for societal collapse.

The Legend of Zelda: The Wind Waker (2002) is set in the Great Sea, a massive ocean that was formed following a magical flood that destroyed all settlements besides those located on mountain peaks. This is later revealed to be the result of Hyrule's goddesses submerging the land to stop Ganon. Ganon attempts to raise Hyrule from the depths, but is thwarted by the wish of Daphnes Nohansen Hyrule, the last king of Hyrule. By the end of the game, Link and Tetra set off to find a new land.

In the film The Day After Tomorrow (2004), based on Art Bell's and Whitley Strieber's speculative non-fiction novel The Coming Global Superstorm (1999), extreme weather events caused by climate change invoke mass destruction across the planet, and eventually result in a new ice age.

The video game The Long Dark (2017) depicts survival in the wilderness of northern Canada during winter after a geomagnetic disaster has disabled all modern technology.

=== Failure of modern technology ===
In E. M. Forster's novelette "The Machine Stops" (1909), humanity has been forced underground due to inhospitable conditions on Earth's surface, and is entirely dependent on "the machine," a god-like mechanical entity which has supplanted almost all free will by providing for humankind's every whim. The machine deteriorates and eventually stops, ending the lives of all those dependent upon it, though one of the dying alludes to a group of humans dwelling on the surface who will carry the torch of humanity into the future.

In René Barjavel's novel Ravage (1943), written and published during the German occupation of France, a future France is devastated by the sudden failure of electricity, causing chaos, disease, and famine, with a small band of survivors desperately struggling for survival.

Fred Saberhagen goes one better than Barjavel with the Empire of the East series. The series starts with the 1968 book The Broken Lands, sometime after the "Change" (with sincere nods from Boyett and Stirling), in which a defense designed to temporarily make nukes inoperative permanently changes some of the laws of science for magic.

Steve Boyett's novel Ariel (1983, sub-titled "A Book of the Change") also has all technology—including electricity, gunpowder, and some physics principles—ceasing to function, while magic becomes real. He also contributed to the 1986 Borderland series, which investigates a return of the Realm of Faery to the world.

The Quiet Earth, a 1985 New Zealand movie notable for its visually stunning ending, follows a scientist's descent into madness after he awakens to a world where all members of the kingdom Animalia have seemingly disappeared. After recovering and finding other people, he realizes his experiments with energy transfers through the Earth's magnetic field are to blame, and that, unless he shuts down the experiment, it will destroy the planet.

S. M. Stirling also takes a swipe at the inconstant-physical-constants field with the Emberverse series. Dies the Fire (2004), The Protector's War (2005), and A Meeting at Corvallis (2006), depict the world's descent into feudalism after a sudden mysterious "change" alters physical laws so that electricity, gunpowder, and most forms of high-energy-density technology no longer work. Civilization collapses, and two competing groups struggle to re-create medieval technologies and skills, as well as master magic. Like Boyett's novel, Stirling's features Society for Creative Anachronism members as favorably disposed survivors, and a hang glider attack against a building.

Afterworld (2007) is an animated American science fiction television series where a network of satellites firing persistent electronic pulses, combined with a strange nanotechnology, destroyed most electronic technology on the planet and caused the deaths of 99% of humanity, and is now causing strange mutations to occur in lower forms of life.

The video game series S.T.A.L.K.E.R. is set after a second Chernobyl Disaster which pollutes the Ukrainian countryside, resulting in otherworldly changes to the environment and causing the flora, fauna and laws of physics to irreversibly morph and mutate.

John Barnes' Daybreak series (2010) deals with an America devastated by a nanotech swarm.

NBC's Revolution (2012–2014) also revolved around a "change" after which the principles of electricity and physics are inoperable; however, the focus of the story is on how a group of protagonists attempt to get the power back on while opposing the efforts of a tyrannical militia leader, who seeks to understand it first so that he can take absolute power.

The web series H+: The Digital Series (2012-2013) depicts, in part, the aftermath of a world in which a computer virus that infected a popular brain-computer interface killed one-third of the population, leading to a breakdown in order and the lack or shortage of electricity and other modern conveniences.

All Systems Down (2018) is an American novel which describes a cyber war that cripples Western infrastructure, resulting in the collapse of society.

Robert Harris's novel The Second Sleep (2019) is set in a fundamentalist agrarian society several centuries after the collapse of global civilisation, which is implied to be the result of a sudden breakdown of the internet, possibly as the result of cyberwarfare.

==== AI takeover and technological singularity ====
AI takeover—the idea that some kind of artificial intelligence may supplant humankind as the dominant intelligence on the planet—is a common theme in science fiction. Famous cultural touchstones include Terminator and The Matrix.

The topic of technological singularity, also known as "singularity," was first coined in 1993. Since then, the idea of the term has been used to produce countless major motion pictures and earn Hollywood producers millions of dollars at the box office. The "singularity" refers to a future moment in human history when science and science fiction, religion and philosophy, and hope and fear converge. The mathematician and science fiction writer Vernor Vinge coined the term to denote a juncture when artificial intelligence (AI) equals, and then in an intelligence explosion, far exceeds human intelligence." In laymen's terms, technological singularity is the theoretical future moment when artificial intelligence surpasses human intelligence and becomes aware, autonomous, and potentially threatening to humans.

- The Terminator (1984), a science-fiction thriller directed by James Cameron, is about a futuristic killing machine called the Terminator (Arnold Schwarzenegger), which is sent back to the year 1984 to assassinate a young woman named Sarah Connor (Linda Hamilton). The cyborg comes from the year 2029, following a nuclear war that has devastated the better part of civilization. Computer defense mechanisms have turned on their creators, starting another war in an effort to eliminate the human race altogether. Humanity's valiant rebel leader is John Connor, Sarah's son, who is destined to help them win the war, with the Terminator the only thing standing in the way. Sent back to the present, the Terminator must kill Sarah before John is born. It systematically eliminates every Sarah Connor in the city of Los Angeles, but Sarah escapes with the man sent to protect her, Kyle Reese (Michael Biehn), before the Terminator can get to her. What follows is a massive chase that will eventually end in victory for mankind. Co-writer William Wisher Jr. has a cameo as a police officer.

=== Fossil fuel supply scarcities ===
The film Mad Max (1979), directed by George Miller, presents a world in which oil resources have been nearly exhausted, resulting in constant energy shortages and a breakdown of law and order. The police do battle with criminal motorcycle gangs, with the result being the complete breakdown of modern society and nuclear war, as depicted in Mad Max 2 (1981). The opening narration of Mad Max 2 implies that the fuel shortage was caused not just by peak oil, but also by oil reserves being destroyed during a large scale conflict in the Middle East. The remnants of society survive either through scavenging, or in one notable case, as depicted in the third sequel Mad Max Beyond Thunderdome (1985), by using methane derived from pig feces.

James Howard Kunstler's novel World Made By Hand (2008) imagines life in upstate New York after a declining world oil supply has wreaked havoc on the US economy, and people and society are forced to adjust to daily life without cheap oil.

Canadian novelist Douglas Coupland's book Player One (2010) deals with four individuals taking refuge in a Toronto airport bar while a series of cataclysmic events occurs outside.

Alex Scarrow's novel Last Light and its sequel Afterlight narrate the fall of British civilization after a war in the Middle East eradicates the majority of the Earth's oil supply.

The backstory of the video game series Fallout revolves around the so-called "Resource Wars", beginning circa 2050, when oil supplies become depleted, leading to a disastrous series of wars that include Europe going to war with the Middle East before disintegrating into warring nation-states after all available oil is used up, the United Nations collapsing, the U.S annexing Mexico and Canada, and finally total nuclear war between the U.S and China in 2077 after over 25 years of war.

=== Pandemic ===
==== Comics ====
Crossed by Garth Ennis is set in a post-apocalyptic world in which a bodily fluid-borne virus has destroyed civilization. Carriers of the virus develop a cross-shaped rash on their faces and act without inhibitions, raping, killing and torturing the few remaining uninfected humans.

Y: The Last Man by Brian K. Vaughan and Pia Guerra deals with the lives of Yorick Brown and his monkey Ampersand, after a plague wipes out all but three male mammals on Earth, leaving the whole planet to be controlled by women.

The Walking Dead is a comic book series published by Image Comics, written by Robert Kirkman, with artwork initially by Tony Moore, and later by Charlie Adlard. It began in 2003 and concluded in 2019. The story follows a group of survivors navigating a post-apocalyptic world overrun by zombies. The Walking Dead television series is based on the comic books, which have also spawned a motion comic.

Kamandi is an American comic book character, created by artist Jack Kirby and published by DC Comics. In the eponymous series, Kamandi is a teenage boy on a post-apocalyptic Earth that the textual narrative describes as "Earth A.D. (After Disaster)". The Earth has been ravaged by a mysterious calamity called the Great Disaster. The precise nature of the Great Disaster is never revealed in the original series, although it "had something to do with radiation" (in the series' letter column, Jack Kirby and his then-assistant Steve Sherman repeatedly asserted that the Great Disaster was not a nuclear war, a fact confirmed in issue #35). The Disaster wiped out human civilization and a substantial portion of the human population. A few isolated pockets of humanity survived in underground bunkers, while others quickly reverted to pre-technological savagery.

Xenozoic Tales (also known as Cadillacs & Dinosaurs) is an alternative comic book by Mark Schultz set in a post-apocalyptic future starring mechanic Jack Tenrec and scientist Hannah Dundee. Earth has been ravaged by pollution, and natural disasters and humanity survived by building vast underground cities. Some 600 years later, mankind emerged to find that the world had been reclaimed by previously extinct lifeforms, most spectacularly dinosaurs. In the new 'Xenozoic' era, technology is extremely limited and those with mechanical skills command a great deal of respect and influence.

Killraven (Jonathan Raven) is a fictional character appearing in American comic books published by Marvel Comics. Created by co-plotters Roy Thomas and Neal Adams and scriptwriter Gerry Conway, the Martians from H. G. Wells' The War of the Worlds return in 2001 for another attempt at conquering the planet, later retconned as extrasolar aliens using Mars as a staging area. After humanity's enslavement, men not used as breeders or collaborators are trained and forced to battle gladiator-style for the Martians' amusement; women are used as breeders to supply infants, which are eaten by the Martians as a delicacy. Jonathan Raven, dubbed Killraven as his gladiatorial nom de guerre, escapes with the help of the gladiatorial "keeper", but without his brother, Deathraven. Killraven joins the Freemen, a group of freedom fighters against Martian oppression.

Deathlok is a Marvel comic book character created by Rich Buckler and Doug Moench. Colonel Luther Manning is an American soldier who was fatally injured and reanimated in a post-apocalyptic future, originally given the date of 1990, as the experimental cyborg Deathlok the Demolisher. He verbally communicates with his symbiotic computer, to which he refers as the abbreviated "'Puter". He battles the evil corporate and military regimes that have taken over the United States, while simultaneously struggling to retain his humanity.

Hercules, as portrayed in the DC comic book series titled Hercules Unbound, featured the adventures of Hercules in a post-apocalyptic future. It made use of characters and concepts, such as the Atomic Knights and the intelligent animals from Jack Kirby's Kamandi, the Last Boy on Earth series as an attempt to tie in some of the future series.

Judge Dredd is set in a future Earth damaged by World War III, a nuclear war instigated by corrupt U.S. President "Bad" Bob Booth in 2070. The majority of the world was left an irradiated wasteland filled with hostile mutant lifeforms, with the surviving population being centralized in the so-called Mega-Cities, massive urban sprawls covering entire states created to deal with overpopulation during the 21st century. Further massive conflicts during the comics' present, such as the "Apocalypse War" against East-Meg, the government of the former Soviet territories, and the "Day Of Chaos" cause even more destruction.

Axa is set on a post-apocalyptic Earth in the year 2080. The titular character is a woman who, having grown sick of the regimented and stifling society inside a domed city, flees into the untamed wilderness. The strip mixed elements of science fiction and sword-swinging barbarian tales; the lead character herself resembles Red Sonja.

Meltdown Man (SAS Sergeant Nick Stone) finds himself flung into the far-future by a nuclear blast, where the last remaining humans are led by a merciless tyrant called Leeshar and rule over the eugenically modified animal castes known as 'Yujees'. Accompanied by catwoman Liana, bullman T-Bone and loyal wolfman Gruff, Stone is intent on ending Leeshar's dark reign by leading the slave-like Yujees in rebellion.

Mighty Samson was set in the area around New York City, now known as "N'Yark", in an Earth devastated by a nuclear war. The series featured Samson, a barbarian adventurer, and was created by writer Otto Binder and artist Frank Thorne.

Druuna is an erotic science fiction and fantasy comic book character created by Italian cartoonist Paolo Eleuteri Serpieri. Most of Druuna's adventures revolve around a post-apocalyptic future, and the plot is often a vehicle for varied scenes of hardcore pornography and softcore sexual imagery.

==== Films and television ====
Director George A. Romero's Night of the Living Dead (1968), and its five sequels, including Dawn of the Dead (1978) and Day of the Dead (1985), popularized the concept of a zombie apocalypse, focusing on the breakdown of American society in a world where the dead are re-animating as mindless, undead cannibals due to some unknown disease, implied to be extraterrestrial in origin, and anyone bitten but not eaten will soon become a zombie as well.

The BBC television series Survivors (1975–1977) and its 2008 remake series focus on a group of British survivors in the aftermath of a genetically engineered virus that has killed over 90% of the world's population. The first series of both versions examine the immediate after-effects of a pandemic outbreak of the flu, while the subsequent series concentrate on the survivors' attempts to build communities and make contacts with other groups.

The Japanese film Virus (1980) illustrates the global effects of the deadly MM88, a fictional virus that potentiates the effects of any other disease. It also features a doomsday device where it is discovered that the nuclear arsenal could be triggered by an earthquake in a chain reaction.

12 Monkeys (1995) is a science fiction film that depicts the remains of human civilization after an uncontrollable pandemic wipes out 99% of the human population. It is a semi-remake of La Jetée (1962), and both films focus on the theme of fate by introducing the ability to travel through time and make contact with pre-apocalyptic society. 12 Monkeys is also a SyFy television series that premiered in 2015.

The Tribe (1999) is a television series that deals with a mysterious virus that kills the adult population, leaving the children of the world to fend for themselves, divided into different tribes and fighting against each other for their survival. The show focuses on the tribe called the Mall Rats, who take shelter in the city's mall to protect themselves from the dangers outside; however, the virus mutates and begins to infect all the children, forcing the Mall Rats to search for the rumoured virus antidote hidden in government buildings that the adults left behind.

The film 28 Days Later (2002) and its sequels 28 Weeks Later (2007), 28 Years Later (2025) and 28 Years Later: The Bone Temple (2026) revolve around a virus in Britain that turns anyone infected into a mindlessly violent psychotic, though still alive and not undead, in a variation of the classic zombie theme. This also makes the infected more dangerous, as they can run very quickly and their bodies are not decaying. The plot centers on groups of uninfected survivors and a handful of virus carriers who are immune to the effects of the disease.

In the reboot series of Planet of the Apes, Will Rodman was a scientist of Gen-Sys who was working on an experimental drug he called ALZ-112 in an effort to save his father, who had been diagnosed with Alzheimer's disease. The virus proved a success with ape test subjects by greatly enhancing their intelligence, and managed to cure Rodman's father, but only temporarily, as his body gradually developed antibodies against the virus. In order to make an stronger version, ALZ-113, later dubbed Simian Flu, was created, which proved to be fatal to humans. During the first trial, the virus was accidentally released onto Robert Franklin when Koba kicked off Franklin's breathing mask. Franklin was later found dead, but not before he infected Rodman's neighbor Douglas Hunsiker. After the apes broke free and escaped to the Muir Woods, an infected Hunsiker went to his job as an airline pilot, triggering the spread of the ALZ-113 across the planet via international flight routes and leading to a worldwide pandemic that destroyed most of humanity. Later, the virus mutated, which caused humans to lose their speech capabilities and their advanced intelligence. Eventually, the Apes became the new predominant species of Earth, while humanity have regressed into a primitive state.

In the comedy film Zombieland (2009), a disease mutates most Americans and turns them into animal-like creatures hungry for human flesh. The story is about a group of people who stick together and try to survive against the zombies. Another comedy film, Warm Bodies (2013), adds a romantic twist to its story, as a zombie falls in love with an uninfected woman and protects her from his fellow zombies.

The AMC television series The Walking Dead, based on the comic book series of the same name, premiered in 2010. It centers around a group of people in the state of Georgia who struggle to survive and adapt in a post-apocalyptic world filled with zombies, known as "walkers", and opposing groups of survivors who are often more dangerous than the walkers themselves. The popularity of the series has led to a spin-off franchise comprising an aftershow (Talking Dead), a companion television series (Fear the Walking Dead, a prequel with different characters from the source material), video games (e.g., The Walking Dead: The Game (Season One), The Walking Dead: Season Two and The Walking Dead: Season Three) webisodes (including The Talking Dead webisodes and the Fear the Walking Dead web series), and numerous parodies and spoofs.

World War Z (2013) is an apocalyptic action horror film based on the 2006 novel of the same name by Max Brooks. The film focuses on a former United Nations investigator who must travel the world to find a way to stop a zombie pandemic.

The Last Ship (2014) is an American action-drama television series, based on the 1988 novel of the same name by William Brinkley. After a global viral pandemic wipes out over 80% of the world's population, the crew (consisting of 218 people) of a lone unaffected U.S. Navy Arleigh Burke-class guided-missile destroyer, the fictional USS Nathan James (DDG-151), must try to find a cure, stop the virus, and save humanity.

Train to Busan (2016) is an apocalyptic zombie film, based around a South Korean train from Seoul to Busan, hence the name. The virus was created from a chemical accident, and causes infected animals to develop heightened senses and infected humans to become violent and deadly, but disoriented by darkness. The story follows Seo Seok-woo (Gong Yoo) and his daughter, Su-an (Kim Su-an), as they make their way through a ravaged South Korea.

The Rain (2018) is a Danish post-apocalyptic web-television series. After a rain-borne virus is released over the region of Scandinavia, causing a pandemic. Simone Andersen (played by Alba August) and Rasmus Andersen, along with their mother and father, must make it to an underground bunker. Things soon go awry when the father must leave to find a cure and the children are forced out of the bunker due to lack of food.

The Last Man on Earth (2015) is a post-apocalyptic American comedy TV series over four seasons starring Will Forte. It plays the premise for comedy.

==== Novels and short stories ====
Mary Shelley's The Last Man, published in 1826, is set in the end of the 21st century. It chronicles a group of friends, based on Lord Byron, Percy Bysshe Shelley, and others, moving through Europe as a plague kills most of the world's population. The Scarlet Plague by Jack London, published in 1912, is set in San Francisco in the year 2073, 60 years after a plague has largely depopulated the planet. Isaac Asimov's Nightfall (1941) describes a world with six suns, in constant daylight, except for an eclipse-based night every 2,000 years, leading to mass hysteria and destruction. Written in 1949 by George R. Stewart, Earth Abides is the story of a man who finds most of civilization has been destroyed by a disease. Slowly, a small community forms around him as he struggles to start a new civilization and to preserve knowledge and learning.

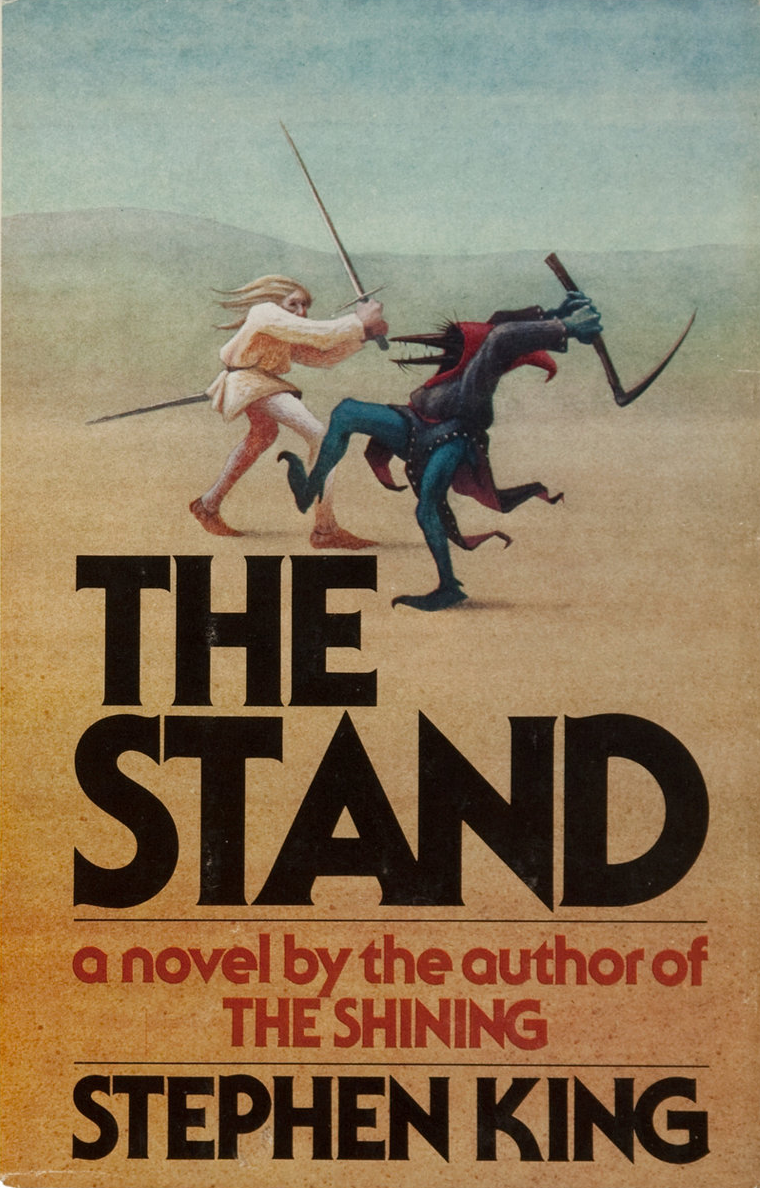
First edition book cover of The Stand by Stephen King (1978)

Empty World is a 1977 novel by John Christopher about an adolescent boy who survives a plague which has killed most of the world's population. Originally published in 1978, Stephen King's The Stand follows the odyssey of a small number of survivors of a world-ending influenza pandemic, later revealed to be the man-made superflu "Captain Trips". It was eventually adapted for a 1994 miniseries of the same title starring Gary Sinise and Molly Ringwald. The novel was semi-inspired by King's earlier short story "Night Surf". Also published in 1977, Graham Masterton's novel titled Plague, tells the story of a mutated and incurable, as well as fatal, version of Yersinia pestis sweeping across the United States. Gore Vidal's 1978 novel Kalki also involves an apocalyptic event caused by a man-made pandemic.

The 1982 novel The White Plague by Frank Herbert has molecular biologist John Roe O'Neill exploring vengeance on a global scale when his wife is killed in an IRA car bombing. He creates a pandemic that kills only women. Written in 1984, the novel Emergence by David R. Palmer is set in a world where a man-made plague destroys the vast majority of the world's population. The novel was nominated for several awards and won the 1985 Compton Crook Award.

José Saramago's 1995 novel Blindness tells the story of a city or country in which a mass epidemic of blindness destroys the social fabric. It was adapted into the film Blindness in 2008. Published in 2003 by Margaret Atwood, Oryx and Crake is set after a genetically modified virus wipes out the entire population except for the protagonist and a small group of humans that were also genetically modified. A series of flashbacks depicting a world dominated by biocorporations explains the events leading up to the apocalypse. This novel was also shortlisted for the Man Booker Prize. A sequel, The Year of the Flood, was published in 2007, followed by MaddAddam in 2013, the trilogy's conclusion.

Richard Matheson's 1954 novel I Am Legend deals with the life of Robert Neville, the only unaffected survivor of a global pandemic that has turned the world's population into vampire zombie-like creatures. The novel has been adapted to film three times: The Last Man on Earth (1964), The Omega Man (1971), and I Am Legend (2007). Jeff Carlson wrote a trilogy of novels beginning with his 2007 debut, Plague Year, a present-day thriller about a worldwide nanotech contagion that devours all warm-blooded life below 10,000 feet (3,000 m) in elevation. Its two sequels, Plague War and Plague Zone, deal with a cure that allows return to an environment that suffered ecological collapse due to massive increases in insects and reptiles.

World War Z: An Oral History of the Zombie War (2006) is an apocalyptic horror novel by Max Brooks. The book is a collection of individual accounts of desperate struggle during and after a devastating global conflict against a zombie plague, narrated by an agent of the United Nations Postwar Commission. It also describes the social, political, religious, and environmental changes that result from the plague.

Emily St. John Mandel's Station Eleven (2014) takes place in the Great Lakes region after a fictional swine flu pandemic, known as the "Georgia Flu", has devastated the world, killing most of the population. The novel won the Arthur C. Clarke Award in May 2015. The award committee highlighted the novel's focus on the survival of human culture after an apocalypse, as opposed to the survival of humanity itself.

James Dashner's The Maze Runner trilogy (2009–2011) takes place after Sun flares have scorched the Earth. As a result, the governments of the world released a virus to kill off some of the world's population to save resources. The virus, nicknamed "The Flare", turned out to be highly contagious and caused the infected to lose control of their mind. The series was made into movies by 20th Century Fox, with The Maze Runner released in 2014, The Scorch Trials in 2015, and the third in the series, The Death Cure, in 2018.

==== Video games ====
Abomination: The Nemesis Project (1999) takes place in 1999 after the United States has been almost wiped out by a deadly plague. The disease started on the East Coast, and communication with the West Coast ceased within 72 hours. The last few groups of survivors stopped broadcasting after six days, and the overwhelming majority of the country's population has been wiped out. The player leads a team of eight genetically altered supersoldiers to defeat an infestation of a global genetic plague which slowly turns into a superorganism.

The Left 4 Dead series (first released in 2008) is set in the days after a pandemic outbreak of a viral strain transforms the majority of the population into zombie-like feral creatures. The games follow the adventures of four survivors attempting to reach safe houses and military rescue while fending off the attacking hordes.

Zero Escape: Virtue's Last Reward (2012) takes place years after an artificial virus, called Radical-6, was released, exterminating almost all of humanity. The sequel, Zero Escape: Zero Time Dilemma (2016) details the events that lead to the virus being released.

Plague Inc. (2012) focuses not on the survival of humanity after or during an apocalypse, but rather on controlling the disease or creature responsible for the destruction of humanity.

The Last of Us (2013) revolves around the premise of a mutated Cordyceps fungus spreading to humans, resulting in the deterioration of society within the United States. The DLC The Last of Us: Left Behind (2014) takes place months before Ellie meets Joel. The sequel The Last of Us Part II (2020) continues the story of Joel and Ellie five years after the first game.

Dying Light (2015) takes place in the city of Harran, quarantined due to a virus that has turned many of its citizens into zombie-like antagonists. An expansion titled Dying Light: The Following (2016) followed. The sequel Dying Light 2 Stay Human (2022) is set 22 years after the events of the first game, in the city Villedor.

They Are Billions (2018) is also an example of a post-apocalyptic future, in which players must establish, manage, and defend colonies amidst a zombie apocalypse.

Tom Clancy's The Division (2016) takes place in a pandemic-ravaged New York City that has become overrun by escaped prisoners, gang-members, and a faction of 'Cleaners' that are determined to end the epidemic by incinerating anything that may be infected.

The Walking Dead (video game series) (2012-2019) deals with the mysterious disease prevalent in all currently living people to become a walker or zombie either by being bitten by one or dying with the brain intact. Hostile survivors roam the remaining living world too and the protagonist, Clementine has to deal with them and friends accordingly.

Death Stranding (2019) is set in a post-apocalyptic United States, which is full of monsters and rain that can speed up the age of anything that it touches.

Infection Free Zone (early access released in 2024) is set in a post apocalyptic Earth on any location of the map. The game map uses 3D alteration of real Earth map data from OpenStreetMap.

=== Religious ===
==== Film ====
The 1970s evangelical horror film A Thief in the Night along with its sequels depict a world in which millions of born-again Christians have been raptured; casual and liberal Christians, as well as non-Christians, are left behind to live through the Great Tribulation. They are persecuted and forced by the one-world government, part of the UN, to take the mark of the beast or be killed. Hugely influential in the Christian entertainment industry, the film would inspire other works in Christian fiction in general and Christian horror and Christian apocalyptic themes in particular, such as the Left Behind series. The film was itself influenced by evangelical Christian author Hal Lindsey's popular 1970 book The Late Great Planet Earth.

The Christian-themed Left Behind series of sixteen novels published between 1995 and 2007, and four film adaptations produced between 2000 and 2014, posits a world in which the righteous believers have suddenly been raptured, en masse, up to Heaven, leaving behind an increasingly troubled and chaotic world in which the Antichrist, foretold in the Book of Revelation, arises to despotically rule over those unfortunate enough to have been "left behind". He is opposed by newly born-again Christians as the end of times (Tribulation) approaches.

=== War ===
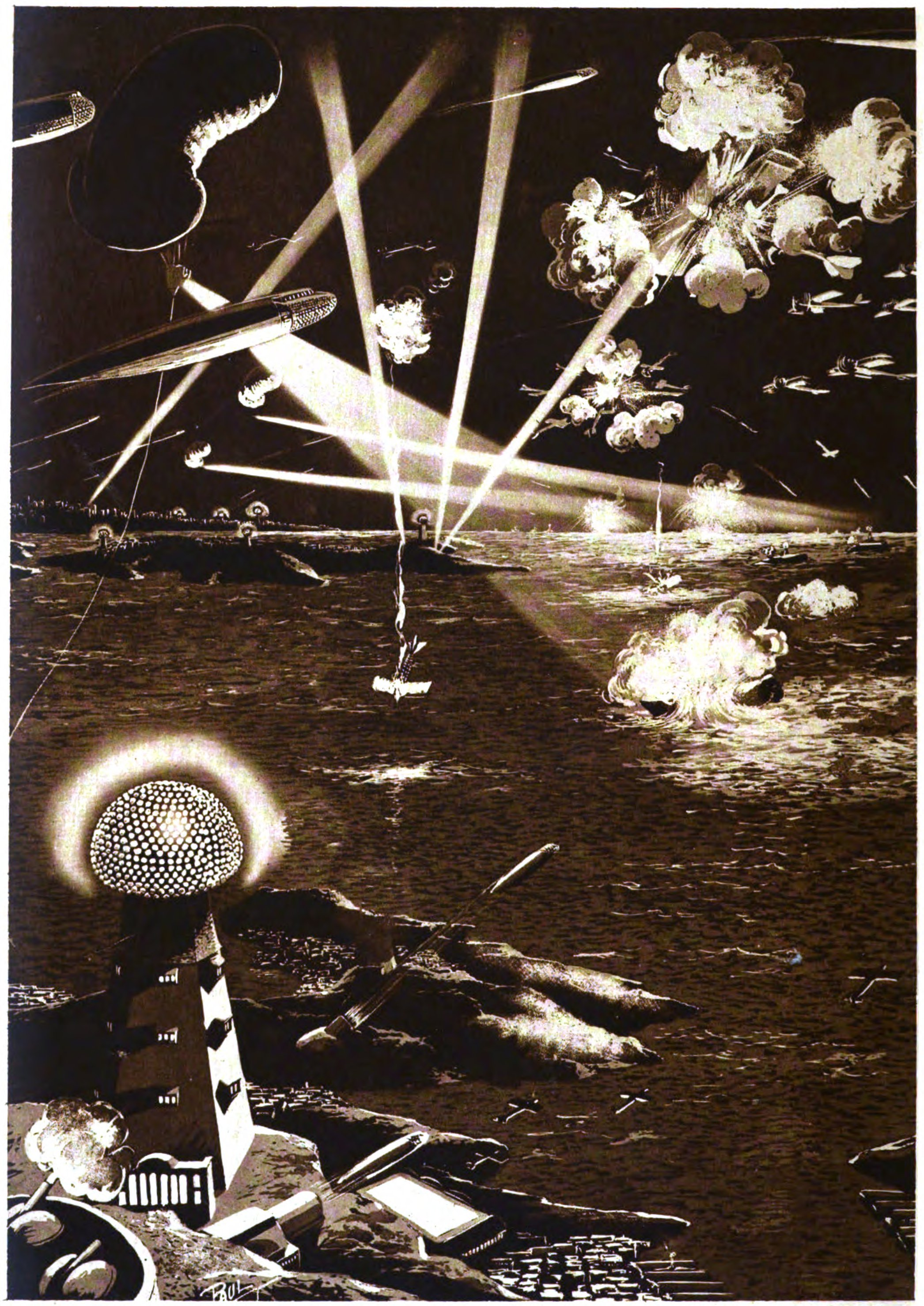
An artist's 1922 vision of a futuristic war

==== Film and television ====
H. G. Wells adapted his novel The Shape of Things to Come (1933) into the movie Things to Come (1936). In the movie, England is reduced to rubble by a prolonged conventional, chemical, and biological war. Survivors are depicted living under the rule of a local warlord who raids his neighbors in an attempt to get his fleet of rotting fighter planes in the air again. At the same time, surviving engineers create a technological utopia.

The film Panic in Year Zero! (1962) tells the story of a Southern California family's fight to survive the violence and chaos that ensue in the aftermath of a nuclear war.

La Jetée (1962) deals with a time traveler sent back in time to help the people of the post-apocalyptic future rebuild civilization after nuclear war destroys most of the world. It was partially remade in 1996 in the film 12 Monkeys.

In 1965 the BBC produced The War Game, but it was considered too graphic and disturbing to broadcast at the time; it was only in 1985 that it was shown. It portrays a nuclear attack on Great Britain and its after-effects, particularly the efforts of the Civil Defence system.

Planet of the Apes (1968) and its first sequel, Beneath the Planet of the Apes (1970) are 40th century-set post-apocalyptic entries in its original five-film series while Battle for the Planet of the Apes (1973) is a turn of the 21st century turn of the third Millennium Post apocalyptic last entry of this series. The other two films between "Beneath..." and "Battle..." were pre-apocalyptic Escape from the Planet of the Apes (1971, pre-nuclear bomb Los Angeles of 'present day') and Conquest of the Planet of the Apes (1972, also pre-nuclear but this time circa 1991 and with a violent ape revolution).

Genesis II (1973), a television film created by Gene Roddenberry, follows Dylan Hunt, a NASA scientist who begins a multi-day suspended animation test right before an earthquake buries the underground laboratory. Discovered in 2133 still alive, he is awakened by the organization PAX, descendants of NASA scientists who promote peace in the world. This television pilot, if picked up, would have followed Dylan and a PAX team as they reach out to the remains of humanity in a post-apocalyptic world by means of a long forgotten underground sub-shuttle rapid transit system that spanned the world right before the Great Conflict. A second pilot, Strange New World, also failed to be picked up as a television series.

The ABC made-for-TV movie The Day After (1983) deals with a nuclear war between NATO and the Warsaw Pact, focusing on a group of people in the U.S. heartland states of Kansas and Missouri attempting to survive during and after the nuclear exchange.

Testament is a 1983 drama film based on a three-page story "The Last Testament" by Carol Amen, which tells the story of how one small suburban town near the San Francisco Bay Area slowly falls apart after a nuclear war destroys outside civilization.

The 1984 BBC television film Threads depicts life before, during, and after the detonation of a Soviet nuclear bomb over Sheffield, England.

The Terminator film franchise (first introduced in 1984) depicts an artificial intelligence called Skynet becoming self-aware in 1997 and trying to exterminate humanity by instigating nuclear war between the United States and Russia, which results in the death of three billion people. Many of the survivors eventually band together to destroy Skynet and its army of robots, called "terminators". The series follows resistance leader John Connor and his mother, Sarah Connor, and their adventures before and after the nuclear strike, called "Judgment Day" in the film series.

CBS produced the TV series Jericho in 2006–2008, which focused on the survival of the town after twenty-three American cities were destroyed by nuclear weapons.

The Cartoon Network series Adventure Time (which began airing in 2010) takes place a thousand years in the future, after a nuclear war referred to as "The Great Mushroom War" wiped out humanity. Afterwards, once existent but eventually forgotten magic was recreated and all kinds of creatures took humanity's place.

Tom Hanks's 2011 web series Electric City is a story based on a post-apocalyptic world. In this world, a group of matriarchs, the "Knitting Society", impose an altruistic but oppressive society to counter the aftermath of a brutal war that brings down modern civilization; however, in time, even this new "utopian" order is ultimately called into question by the inhabitants of the new society.

The CW series The 100 (which began airing in 2014) is a story based on a post-apocalyptic world. After a nuclear war, Earth was uninhabitable and the only survivors were those on space stations which eventually came together to form the Ark; 97 years later on an undeterminable year the Ark is dying and 100 prisoners under the age of 18 are sent to see if Earth is now survivable. There they are faced with the challenges Earth brings and those who survived the nuclear war.

The movie Zardoz is a surreal take on the genre, revolving around a post-apocalyptic future England where a warrior caste called Exterminators worship a giant, floating stone head known as Zardoz, which gives them weapons and ammunition.

The movie The Book of Eli released in 2010. Starring Denzel Washington and Gary Oldman, a story of a lone wanderer trying to deliver a book through the wastelands after a nuclear apocalypse. Everyone has to wear sunglasses/goggles due to solar radiation and cannibalism is prevalent, identified by shaky hands. Oldman runs a town with access to water and supplies and tries to take the last copy of the Christian Bible, in braille, from Washington seeking its power. At the time, he does not realize the Bible is in braille.

==== Novels and short stories ====
Paul Brians's Nuclear Holocausts: Atomic War in Fiction (1987) is a study that examines atomic war in short stories, novels, and films between 1895 and 1984. Since this measure of destruction was no longer imaginary, some of these new works, such as Nevil Shute's On the Beach (1957), which was subsequently twice adapted for film (in 1959 and 2000), Mordecai Roshwald's Level 7 (1959), Pat Frank's Alas, Babylon (1959), and Robert McCammon's Swan Song (1987), shun the imaginary science and technology that are the identifying traits of general science fiction. Others include more fantastic elements, such as mutants, alien invaders, or exotic future weapons such as James Axler's Deathlands (1986).

In Stephen Vincent Benét's story "By the Waters of Babylon" (1937, originally titled "The Place of the Gods"), a young man explores the ruins of a city in the northeastern United States, possibly New York City, generations after a war in which future weapons caused "The Great Burning".

According to some theorists, the atomic bombing of Hiroshima and Nagasaki in 1945 has influenced Japanese popular culture to include many apocalyptic themes. Much of Japan's manga and anime are filled with apocalyptic imagery. The 1954 film Gojira (1954, romanized as Godzilla) depicted the title monster as an analogy for nuclear weapons, something Japan had experienced first-hand.

Judith Merril's first novel Shadow on the Hearth (1950) is one of the earliest post-World War II novels to deal with a post-nuclear-holocaust world. The novel recounts the ordeals of a young suburban housewife and mother of two children as she struggles to survive in a world forever changed by the horrors of a nuclear attack. Several of Ray Bradbury's short stories of The Martian Chronicles take place before, during, and after a nuclear war on Earth. The people flee Earth and settle on Mars but have constant conflicts with the native Martians. Several of these stories have been adapted to other media.

Andre Norton's Star Man's Son (1952, also known as Daybreak 2250), is an early post-nuclear-war novel that follows a young man, Fors, in search of lost knowledge. Fors begins his Arthurian quest through a radiation-ravaged landscape with the aid of a telepathic mutant cat. He encounters mutated creatures called "the beast things", which are possibly mutated rats or a degenerate form of humans.

Wilson Tucker's novel The Long Loud Silence (1952) posits a post-nuclear holocaust America in which the eastern half of the country has been largely destroyed and its surviving inhabitants infected with a plague and barred from crossing the Mississippi River to try to find refuge in the unscathed western part of the country.

A nuclear war occurs at the end of Bradbury's dystopian futuristic novel Fahrenheit 451 (1953), with the outcasts, who had fled an unidentified American city to escape a despotic government which burned books in order to control the public by limiting knowledge, left alive to re-establish society.

John Wyndham's 1955 novel The Chrysalids (United States title: Re-Birth), set in a small community untold centuries after a nuclear holocaust, which is not expressly told, but strongly hinted at with genetic mutations, glowing ruins, and landscape baked to glass. It tells the story of David, part of a small group of teens who share a limited form of telepathy that allows them to communicate with others who have the same talent; however, the fundamentalist society they live in regards the slightest difference from the norm as a blasphemy and affront to God. The group attempt to remain hidden; when this fails, they must survive during a war between mutants and the fundamentalists while awaiting rescue from members of a distant advanced telepathic human civilization.

In Walter M. Miller Jr.'s A Canticle for Leibowitz (1959) a recrudescent Catholic Church, pseudo-medieval society, and rediscovery of the knowledge of the pre-holocaust world are central themes.

Edgar Pangborn's Tales of a Darkening World: The Davy Series, written mostly in the 1960s and 1970s, takes place after a nuclear war. The best-known story is the novel Davy.

Poul Anderson's Maurai series (1959–1983) also takes place after a nuclear war, and his Hugo and Prometheus award-winning story "No Truce With Kings" takes place after a cataclysmic war. Both show the interactions among various kinds of societies that have developed in the centuries of recovery.

Robert Heinlein's 1964 novel Farnham's Freehold follows the story of a group of people that have survived a nuclear explosion. The group survives the attack in a fallout shelter but are taken to a future in which Africans rule.

Damnation Alley is a 1967 science fiction novella by Roger Zelazny, which he expanded into a novel in 1969. A film adaptation of the novel was released in 1977.

Harlan Ellison's novella A Boy and His Dog (1969) takes place in a world desolated by the nuclear warfare in World War IV. It was adapted into a 1975 film of the same name as well as a companion graphic novel titled Vic and Blood. In turn, the 1975 film adaptation influenced the Mad Max films, particularly The Road Warrior (1981).

Alexander Key's novel The Incredible Tide (1970) is set years after the Third World War. The weapons used were not nuclear, but ultra-magnetic that tore and submerged the continents. The story was adapted in the anime Future Boy Conan (1978).

Russell Hoban's Riddley Walker (1980), set in the English county of Kent around two thousand years after a nuclear war, also has religious or mystical themes and is written in a fictional future version of English.

In Hayao Miyazaki's manga (1982–1994) and anime film Nausicaä of the Valley of the Wind (1984), human civilization is destroyed after a war known as the "Seven Days of Fire", which results in the Earth's surface becoming polluted and the seas turning poisonous.

William W. Johnstone wrote a series of books between 1983 and 2003 (35 books all containing the word "Ashes" in the title) about the aftermath of worldwide nuclear and biological war.

David Brin's novel The Postman (1985) takes place in an America where some are trying to rebuild civilization after the "Doomwar". It was adapted into the film The Postman (1997).

Orson Scott Card's post-apocalyptic anthology The Folk of the Fringe (1989) deals with American Mormons after a nuclear war.

Jeanne DuPrau's children's novel The City of Ember (2003) was the first of four books in a post-apocalyptic series for young adults. A film adaptation, City of Ember (2008), stars Bill Murray and Saoirse Ronan.

==== Video games ====
In the computer game Wasteland (1988) and its sequels, nuclear war occurred in 1998, leaving a wasteland in its wake. The game centers around a player-controlled party of Desert Rangers. Wasteland 2 was produced in 2015 and Wasteland 3 in 2020, both continuing the story of the Desert Rangers.

Fallout, an ongoing series of post-apocalyptic role-playing games first published in 1997, depicts a world after a series of resource wars that culminates in a massive nuclear exchange between the U.S and China in 2077. The games revolve around "vaults," underground bunkers for long-term survival that are in reality social experiments created by the ruling elite of the pre-war United States, and exploring the outside wasteland, in locations such as California, Las Vegas, Washington D.C., New England, and West Virginia. Fallout draws heavily from retro 1950s sci-fi, and the setting combines elements of mid-20th century technology, such as vacuum tubes and monochrome screens, with highly advanced artificial intelligences and energy weapons.

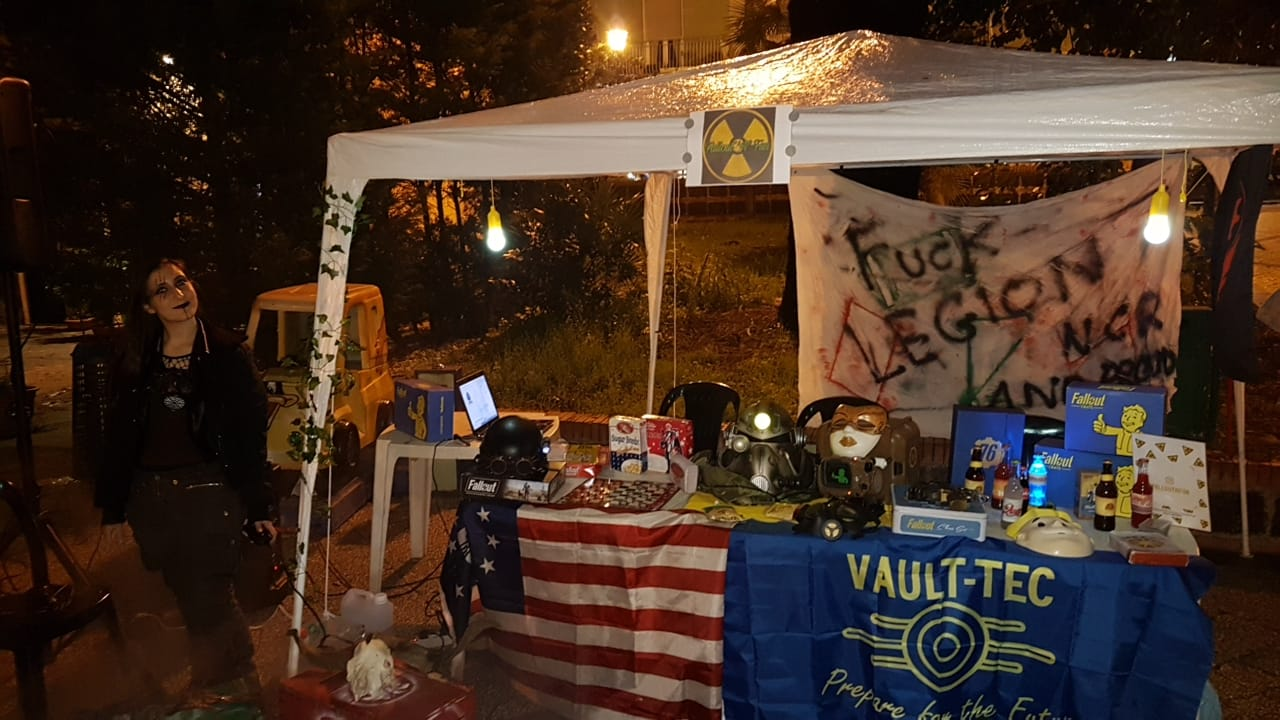
A cosplayer at a Comic Con in a Fallout-themed area

In Metro 2033 (2010), a nuclear war occurs in late 2013. Russia was targeted with atomic bombs, causing severe radiation across Moscow and forcing the rest of the people to live underground in the metro stations away from the deadly effects of radiation. Many animals and humans left behind mutated into creatures known as the Dark Ones, who were left outside for the next 20 years. The game is played from the perspective of Artyom, a 20-year-old male survivor and one of the many children brought into the metro right before the bombs dropped. The story takes place in post-apocalyptic Moscow, mostly inside the metro system, but some missions have the player go to the surface, which is severely irradiated, and a gas mask must be worn at all times due to the toxic air. A sequel, Metro: Last Light, was released in 2013. A sequel to Metro: Last Light; Metro: Exodus, was produced in 2019.

Nuclear apocalypse followed by a demon invasion is a recurring staple of the Shin Megami Tensei series. In those games it is generally seen as a major religious event created by or following the orders of God, an example of this is in the 1992 Super Famicom game Shin Megami Tensei, in which the Germanic Deity Thor, following the orders of God, rains ICBMs on the city of Tokyo, initiating the second act of the game and setting up for its sequel, Shin Megami Tensei II. In the franchise, these events are referred to as The Great Cataclysm.

The Danganronpa series is revealed to be set in a world where society has collapsed as a result of "The Biggest, Most Awful, Most Tragic Event in Human History" which involves constant chaos, violence, and death for the sake of spreading despair.

In Doom Eternal, sometime after the events on Mars in Doom, Earth has been overrun by demonic forces, wiping out most of the planet's population, under the now-corrupted Union Aerospace Corporation. What remains of humanity has either fled Earth or have joined the Armored Response Coalition, a resistance movement formed to stop the invasion, which has gone into hiding after suffering heavy losses. The Doom Slayer, having previously been betrayed and teleported away by Dr. Samuel Hayden, returns with a satellite fortress controlled by the AI VEGA to quell the demonic invasion by killing the Hell Priests.

Call of Duty: Ghosts (2013) is set in a near future that follows the nuclear destruction of the Middle East. The oil-producing nations of South America form the "Federation of the Americas" in response to the ensuing global economic crisis and quickly grow into a global superpower, swiftly invading and conquering Central America, the Caribbean, and Mexico.

Judgment: Apocalypse Survival Simulation (2016) is set during an ongoing Apocalypse, after a Hellgate opens on Earth and a host of demons enter the world. The player controls a group of survivors that found a base to fight back and find a way to repel the invasion.

The Splatoon franchise takes place in a future where humans and all mammals died out due to accelerating climate change, multiple wars, and the detonation of a nuclear device in the ice caps causing the ocean levels to rapidly rise. Although many groups of humans tried to survive for some time, both in an underground habitat called Alterna and on a spacecraft called Ark Polaris, all of the attempts resulted in accidents that led to the groups dying out. The DLC Splatoon 2 : Octo Expansion introduces the character of Commander Tartar, its purpose being to pass down humanity's knowledge to the next dominant species that may rise after the devastation of Earth's biosphere.

Old World Blues is a Hearts of Iron IV mod set in the Fallout universe. This mod has been praised for its effective portrayal of the Fallout series within a grand strategy setting.

My Time at Portia and My Time at Sandrock (released 2019 and 2023 respectively) are both farm sim video games that were developed by Pathea. Both games took place 300 years after most modern technologies were destroyed.

Ultrakill (2020) is set in a world where all of humanity has died out due to various causes in an alternate World War I, leaving behind blood-powered machinery which resides in the game's version of Hell.

=== Other ===
==== Anime and manga ====
Violence Jack (1973), a manga and anime series by Go Nagai, is set in a post-apocalyptic world with corruption and psychotic gangs. It is credited with creating the post-apocalyptic manga and anime genre, depicting its post-apocalyptic world as a desert wasteland with biker gangs, anarchic violence, ruined buildings, innocent civilians, tribal chiefs, and small abandoned villages. This was similar to, and may have influenced, the desert wasteland settings of later post-apocalyptic franchises such as the film series Mad Max (1979) and the manga/anime series Fist of the North Star (Hokuto no Ken, 1983). Goichi Suda (Suda 51), who cited Violence Jack as an influence on his video game series No More Heroes (2007), stated: "All of the desert-setting titles are actually inspired by Violence Jack. That came way before Hokuto no Ken, so that's the real origin of everything."

Katsuhiro Otomo's cyberpunk manga and anime series Akira (1982) is set in a post-apocalyptic Neo-Tokyo. Buronson's Fist of the North Star (1983) is a story about Kenshiro, the successor of the deadly ancient martial art, Hokuto Shinken, in a world destroyed by nuclear war.

Hayao Miyazaki's manga series Nausicaä of the Valley of the Wind (1982), later adapted into a 1984 anime film by Studio Ghibli, depicts a post-apocalyptic future where industrial civilization was wiped out in the "Seven Days of Fire" 1,000 years before the main events and a "Toxic Jungle" threatens the last of humanity. Nausicaä is the princess of The Valley of the Wind who, rather than destroying the Toxic Jungle, decides to study its flora and fauna in the hopes of co-existing with the forest.

The manga and anime series Dragon Ball Z (1989) and Dragon Ball Super (2015), sequels to Akira Toriyama's Dragon Ball, contain parallel timelines generated by time-travel to the past from an apocalyptic and post-apocalyptic future. Two cybernetic humans caused the mass extinction of roughly two-thirds of Earth's human population. Years later, the higher dimensional being Zamasu, also known as Goku Black, teamed up with the version of himself from the future timeline. They killed all but two of the remaining population, along with an unknown amount of beings from other inhabited planets in that universe.

Battle Angel Alita (1990) is a cyberpunk manga about an amnesiac female cyborg, Alita. It was later adapted into the James Cameron film Alita: Battle Angel (2019).

The anime and manga X by Clamp features a supernatural apocalypse. In it, there is a battle over the end of the world between the "Dragons of Heaven" who wish to save humanity, and the "Dragons of Earth" who wish to wipe out humanity. The central character, Kamui Shirō, has to choose which side to fight for. The manga began in 1992 and has been on hiatus since 2003. It has been adapted as an anime film in 1996 and an anime television series between 2001 and 2002.

In Neon Genesis Evangelion (1995), the story takes place on an Earth shattered by the Second Impact in Antarctica (referring to the "giant-impact hypothesis" 4.5 billion years ago, Theia, as the first impact), which caused mass extinctions and wars as well as significant changes to the planet's climate and population. The security agency NERV tries to secure Neo Tokyo from a Third Impact while withholding the true story of the Second Impact from the public and even the protagonists.

Uchuu no Stellvia (2003) describes an Earth after being hit by a large electromagnetic wave from a supernova of a nearby star, where mankind needs to rescue the earth 189 years after the impact from a second wave of matter approaching the solar system. The anime shows a globalized society who have put together to fight this "enemy".

In Black Bullet (2011), the Earth was devastated by an alien race, spreading a virus that transforms humans into some kind of insect. Only the major cities holding back behind big walls of some fictitious material and are under constant threat to be invaded when these walls fail.

Attack on Titan (2009) showcases a similar story, where society has fallen back into a medieval state and humanity has taken refuge behind three massive stone walls that protect them from the Titans, massive naked humanoid creatures who feed on humans.

In Seraph of the End (2012), the world is destroyed by a virus created by humans who kill all humans except for those under 13 years old, and vampires have taken over the Earth using humans for food.

In Kino's Journey, the titular protagonist is a fifteen-year-old girl who forms a link with a talking motorbike named Hermes. Together, the duo explores different places and different nations while appreciating the young beauty of life. Their journey through the post-apocalyptic world and various ruins teaches them about life and its unknown depths.

In Devilman Crybaby (2018) the story describes the downfall of human race due to paranoia towards anyone after Ryo Asuka, the main villain, spreads false information that anyone can be a demon due to dissatisfaction with society.

In Apocalypse Hotel (2025), the series follows the surviving robot staff working in a hotel in Ginza, a century after humanity left Earth following a disease that left the air poisonous to humans, and taking in guests such as visiting aliens.

==== Films and literature ====
In Ayn Rand's novella Anthem (1938), society has entered a near-medieval state after a new government forbids any kind of individual thought, even forbidding the words I and me.

In Arthur C. Clarke's short story "The Nine Billion Names of God" (1953), the universe ends when Tibetan monks, making use of a specially-written computer program, finish writing all of the nine billion possible names of God. The story won a retrospective Hugo Award.

The Day the Earth Caught Fire (1961) is a film by Val Guest about an Earth thrown out of its orbit around the Sun by excessive nuclear testing. It paints a picture of a society ready to believe that humans could destroy the planet, hoping that science could fix what it has broken but resigned to the possibility of irreversible doom.

The film Soylent Green (1973), loosely based upon Harry Harrison's science fiction novel Make Room! Make Room! (1966), is set in the dystopian future of 2022, in an overpopulated, heavily polluted world. The masses of mostly homeless and destitute people have been herded into the overcrowded cities and barely survive on government-issued food rations made from the processed corpses of the dead.

Ernst Jünger's novel Eumeswil's (1977) key theme is the figure of the Anarch, the inwardly-free individual who lives quietly and dispassionately within, but not of society and the post apocalyptic world.

John Crowley's novel Engine Summer (1979) takes place perhaps a thousand years after "the Storm" destroyed industrial civilization. Surviving cultures seem to be influenced by the 1960s and 1970s counterculture.

Cormac McCarthy's The Road (2006) takes place several years after an unspecified cataclysm that forces a father and son to perpetually search for survival. It was adapted into a film in 2009.

Robert Reed's short story "Pallbearer" (2010) deals with most of the developed world's population dying after a mass vaccination program in which the vaccines were purposefully tainted. The survivors are those who were not vaccinated, often for religious reasons, and their descendants. Most of the developing world does not receive the vaccine, and decades later, large numbers of its refugees are arriving to America's shores. The protagonist survives the disaster as a young boy and has a chance encounter with an elderly scientist and her fanatical younger family members.

James Wesley Rawles' novel Survivors: A Novel of the Coming Collapse (2011) addresses a contemporaneous global economic crash, and focuses on the struggles of a large cast of characters who struggle to survive after what is termed "The Crunch." It covers both the lead up to the economic crash, as well as several years after the crash.

This Is The End (2013) centers on fictionalized versions of its cast in the wake of a global biblical apocalypse. It is a feature-length film adaptation of the short film Jay and Seth versus the Apocalypse (2007), also written by Seth Rogen and Evan Goldberg, with the short's director, Jason Stone, serving as an executive producer.

Escape from New York and its sequel Escape from L.A., as well as supplementary materials published as comic books, is set in a fragmenting United States with rampant crime, pollution, and overpopulation. New York City has been walled off and turned into a gigantic maximum security prison after a 400% rise in crime by 1988. The same happens to Los Angeles in 2000, when a massive earthquake floods the San Fernando Valley, isolating L.A off the west coast.

Robert Jordan's The Wheel of Time is set in a fictional post-apocalyptic world with a medieval society. In the world, a system of magic, known as the One Power, is divided into a male half (saidin) and a female half (saidar). 3,000 years before the series, the world was a high tech utopia. When humanity tried to find a magic that both men and women could use, they encountered the Dark One, a Satan-like being able to corrupt human nature and the natural world. A war between the "Light" and the "Shadow", the Dark One and his followers, ended with the Dark One being imprisoned with saidin. However, he corrupted it from within his prison, driving male users of the Power insane and causing them to destroy civilization and geography in what is known as the "Breaking of the World". The era before the Breaking is later remembered as the "Age of Legends", since much knowledge was lost, and many common feats of that time seemed miraculous to the characters of the series.

==== Games ====
- In the Gamma World (1978) tabletop roleplaying game, the reason for apocalypse varies depending on the edition, going from nuclear war to alien invasion to technology gone rampant to the merging of realities caused by the Large Hadron Collider.
- In the Twilight: 2000 (1984) tabletop roleplaying game, the setting is five years after World War III began, a conventional war followed by a limited nuclear exchange.
- In Ubisoft's videogame I Am Alive (2012), America has gone through a massive cataclysm known as "the Event" that destroys most cities and areas. Due to the damage of the aftermath, many people are forced to go without resources, causing citizens to become agitated, violent, and bitter, turning them into savage hunters.
- In the Lisa: The Painful videogame (2014), the world has been turned into a desert wasteland by a mysterious event called the "White Flash".
- In the Nomad Gods (1977) boardgame, the board depicts an area called the Plaines of Prax, that have been blasted by titanic battles between two gods making it uninhabitable.
- In Guerrilla Games' Horizon Zero Dawn and Horizon Forbidden West, the world ended due to an event called the "Faro Plague" but life lives on due to an AI called GAIA.

==== Music ====
Many musicians have post-apocalyptic themes and imagery in their lyrics. For example, Muse's album The 2nd Law (2012) was inspired by post-apocalyptic life in World War Z, and the event is referred to specifically in the song "Apocalypse Please" (2003).

Post-apocalyptic scenarios were a common theme in the music of Jefferson Airplane and Jefferson Starship, most notably the song "Wooden Ships" and the album Blows Against the Empire.

The music video for the song "Mankind Man"(1995) by the Barstool Prophets featured a dystopian view of the future reminisent of Lord of the Flies and Mad Max. Likewise, the music video for The Sisters of Mercy song "This Corrosion" takes place in a post-apocalyptic setting.

== See also ==
- American militia movement – Political movement of paramilitary groups in the US
- Apocalypticism
- Biopunk
- Cyberpunk
- Dark Ages
- Dictatorship
- Divine retribution – Supernatural punishment by a deity
- Dying Earth genre – Subgenre of science fiction, sometimes with elements of science fantasy
- Dystopia
- End of the universe in fiction
- Global catastrophic risk
- Law of the jungle – Expression for behavior without rule of law
- List of apocalyptic films
- List of apocalyptic and post-apocalyptic fiction
- List of nuclear holocaust fiction
- Nuclear weapons in popular culture
- Speculative evolution – Usually, if humans were to become extinct completely in a work of media, any hypothetical animal that could one day inhabit Earth in the distant future would be considered such.
- Survivalism – Movement of individuals or households preparing for emergencies and natural disasters
- World War III in popular culture
