= I. F. Clarke =

British scholar and professor of English (1918–2009)

Ignatius Frederick "Ian" Clarke (10 July 1916 – 5 November 2009) was a British scholar and professor of English, known for his work on science fiction as a bibliographer, historian and editor, and also, with his wife Margaret, as a translator of early French science fiction.

Clarke served in military intelligence during WWII. He received his B.A. in 1950 and his M.A. in 1953 from Liverpool University. From 1953 to 1956 he was head of the English department of the Northumberland Education Committee. In October 1958 he became Senior Lecturer in General Studies in the Department of Industrial Administration at the Royal College of Science and Technology (which became part of the University of Strathclyde). From 1964 to 1981 he was a professor of English Studies at the University of Strathclyde. Clarke specialized in future-war fiction and his 1966 work Voices Prophesying War is recognized as a major contribution. From 1970 to 1973 he was the chief editor for the science fiction reprint program of Cornmarket Press. In 1974 he received the Pilgrim Award from the Science Fiction Research Association. In 1998 he received the SFRA Pioneer Award for his essay Future-War Fiction: The First Main Phase, 1871–1900. Clarke compiled some important science fiction bibliographies and was the editor for the eight-volume British Future Fiction series.

Upon his death, in addition to his wife Margaret, he was survived by two sons and a daughter.

== Books ==
As author

- Voices prophesying war, 1763-1984. 1966.
  - Voices prophesying war : future wars, 1763-3749. 1992.
- Pattern of expectation, 1644-2001. 1979.

As bibliographer

- The tale of the future, from the beginning to the present day: a check-list of those satires, ideal states, imaginary wars and invasions, political warnings and forecasts, interplanetary voyages and scientific romances—all located in an imaginary future period—that have been published in the UK between 1644 and 1960. 1961.
  - The tale of the future, from the beginning to the present day. An annotated bibliography of those satires, ideal states, imaginary wars and invasions, political warnings and forecasts, interplanetary voyages and scientific romances. 1972.
  - The tale of the future, from the beginning to the present day: an annotated bibliography of those satires, ideal states, imaginary wars and invasions, coming catastrophes and end-of-the-world stories, political warnings and forecasts, interplanetary voyages and scientific romances. 1978.

As editor

- edited with John Butt: Victorians and social protest: a symposium. 1973.
- Clarke, I. F.; Clarke, Ignatius Frederick (1995). The tale of the next Great War, 1871-1914: fictions of future warfare and of battles still-to-come. Syracuse University Press. ISBN 9780815626725.
- Clarke, Ignatius Frederick (1997). The Great War with Germany, 1890-1914: fictions and fantasies of the war-to-come. Liverpool University Press. ISBN 978-0-85323-642-9.
- British future fiction. Pickering & Chatto. 2000.

As translator or editor

- The Last Man. Wesleyan University Press. 2003. ISBN 978-0819566089; French original (Le Dernier Homme) by Jean-Baptiste-François-Xavier Cousin de Grainville; translated by I.F. & M. Clarke; introduction & critical material by I.F. Clarke
- Souvestre, Émile (2004). The world as it shall be. Wesleyan University Press. ISBN 978-0-8195-6615-7; French original by Émile Souvestre; translated by Margaret Clarke; edited with an introduction by I.F. Clarke
