= Hothouse Creations =

UK computer game developer

- Industry: Video games
- Founded: 1996
- Defunct: 2007
- Fate: Dissolved
- Headquarters: Bristol, United Kingdom
- Products: Gangsters series
- Owner: ZOO Digital Group PLC
- Number of employees: 50
- Website: www.hothousecreations.com (Archived until April 2006)

Hothouse Creations was a UK computer game developer, founded in 1996. Their first game Gangsters: Organized Crime, sold over 500,000 copies worldwide.

In 2004, it was acquired by ZOO Digital. The last game it developed was Crime Life: Gang Wars.

== Notable games ==
- Gangsters: Organized Crime (1998)
- Abomination: The Nemesis Project (1999)
- Cutthroats: Terror on the High Seas (1999)
- Who Wants to Be a Millionaire? (1999)
- Gangsters 2 (2001)
- Casino, Inc. (2003)
- American Idol / Pop Idol (2003)
- Crime Life: Gang Wars (2005)
