= Gangsters: Organized Crime =

1998 video game

- Developer: Hothouse Creations
- Publisher: Eidos Interactive
- Designer: Martin Capel
- Composers: David Punshon & Richard Wells; Allister Brimble
- Platform: Windows
- Release: EU: December 4, 1998; NA: December 7, 1998
- Genre: Strategy
- Modes: Single-player, multiplayer

Gangsters: Organized Crime, also known as Gangsters, is a strategy game by Eidos Interactive for Windows, first released in 1998, and re-released in 2012 on GOG.com. It is set in the fictional Chicago suburb of New Temperance during the era of Prohibition. A sequel, Gangsters 2: Vendetta, was released by Eidos in 2001.

== Gameplay ==
Gangsters is played by alternating between turn-based and real-time gameplay. The player must first give orders to the gangsters (referred to as "hoods") under their control, which are then played out during the real-time aspect of the game (referred to as the working week).

To have any chance of winning the game, the player must begin expanding their territory by giving hoods orders to extort local businesses into paying protection money to the gang each week and making sure it's collected on time. The player must also begin recruiting more hoods to increase the strength of their gang by giving the appropriate orders. Additional hoods can be recruited from gyms, pool halls, cafés, the docks, and the unemployment office.

The hoods have many different attributes, such as intelligence, fists, and knives, which make them suitable for different missions. A hood with high knife skill and low fists skill may inadvertently kill someone he was merely sent to beat up, for instance. Hoods can be promoted to the rank of "lieutenant", which gives them the ability to lead a crew of hoods. It is also possible to hire a lawyer and an accountant. There are different automobiles and weapons that can be purchased so the gang can carry out orders more effectively.

To support the mob's activities, the player will need to handle administrative responsibilities to ensure a steady flow of cash. This can be done through the purchase of both legal and illegal businesses, maintaining protection rackets, raiding businesses, and bribing or employing the appropriate people to keep the gang out of trouble with the law. A lawyer can ensure that arrested hoods are bailed out or acquitted of criminal charges, while an accountant can launder the mob's finances, commit tax evasion without getting caught, and audit the player's businesses in case the hoods running them are stealing from the mob (in which case they must be dealt with promptly). The FBI can start investigating the player's businesses if they aren't run well enough to avoid attention, resulting in costly shutdowns and "heat" towards the player which can eventually result in their downfall.

The game has three victory conditions with varying degrees of difficulty, from easiest to hardest:

- Go Straight: This requires the player to pull in a good sum of purely legal money from legitimate businesses, ensure that none of their hoods are wanted by the police, and avoid "heat" entirely. Eventually, the player can choose to retire from the life of crime that paved their way to success and convert their criminal enterprises into a legitimate business empire. Rival gangs are the main threat to this goal as their attacks on the player's territory can force the player to make difficult choices that can ruin their chances of going straight.
- Get Elected Mayor: This requires the player to win the upcoming mayoral election, requiring a good lawyer to manage their campaign, a lot of money for campaign expenses, a sizable amount of territory, and enough votes. The player needs to keep their potential voters happy by not collecting too much protection money, efficiently protecting the neighborhood from rival gangs while staying out of trouble themselves, and setting up charitable enterprises such as soup kitchens. Owning certain illegal businesses can give a substantial boost to votes as well.
- Domination: This is the hardest yet least complex way to win, requiring the player to destroy all rival gangs through force until only their gang remains. The difficulty comes from the huge amount of "heat" that will inevitably be generated by wars with the other gangs, the large number of hood casualties that will make it difficult for the player to protect their territory, and the risk of their properties and businesses being attacked, torched, or blown up. Although a war can sometimes be ended in a single blow by assassinating the boss of a rival gang, it is not a perfect solution as one of their hoods can simply take over as a replacement boss and continue the war.

== Reception ==
Reception

Aggregate score
Aggregator	Score
GameRankings	72%

Review scores
Publication	Score
CNET Gamecenter	8/10
Computer Games Strategy Plus	2.5/5
Computer Gaming World	2.5/5
Game Informer	7/10
GameRevolution	B−
GameSpot	5.5/10
IGN	8.5/10
Next Generation	4/5
PC Accelerator	6/10
PC Gamer (US)	82%
PC Zone	58%

The game received above-average reviews according to the review aggregation website GameRankings. Next Generation said, "While there are some interface problems, a few design holes, and a sketchy manual, Gangsters becomes exactly what fans of this genre look for – something that keeps them up late at night."

The game was commercially successful. In the German market, it debuted in ninth place on Media Control's computer game sales rankings for the latter half of December 1998. The game proceeded to secure positions 8 and 11 for the first and second halves of January, respectively. Worldwide, the game sold 350,000 units by June 1999. This performance led Hothouse to begin production of a sequel, Gangsters 2. Sales of the game rose to 500,000 units by November. Hothouse attributed the majority of its sales to Germany, the UK and the U.S.
