= Crime Life: Gang Wars =

2005 video game

- European PlayStation 2 box art
- Developer: Hothouse Creations
- Publisher: Konami
- Designer: James Butler
- Platforms: PlayStation 2; Xbox; Windows
- Release: UK: November 11, 2005; NA: November 22, 2005 (Xbox); NA: November 29, 2005 (PC)
- Genre: Action
- Mode: Single-player

Crime Life: Gang Wars is an action video game developed by Hothouse Creations and published by Konami. It was released for Microsoft Windows, PlayStation 2 and Xbox. There are various methods of earning money, ranging from mugging to burglary. The soundtrack of the game is mostly provided by UK Hip Hop artists and features one exclusive song by the hip-hop group D12, who also contributed their likenesses and voices for some of the game's key characters.

The game has been cited for combining free-roam elements similar to Grand Theft Auto, and beat 'em ups similar to Final Fight.

During the press release, the developers stated that the game's main objective is for the player to "protect his people from exploitation and abuse and defend his crew from violence and treachery that permeates the society he lives in."

== Plot ==
The game takes place in the fictional Grand Central City, which is in turmoil due to rampant gang wars. The protagonist, Tre, becomes a rookie member of the Outlawz, which was once the most powerful gang in the city but now are threatened by a rival gang known as the Headhunterz. Tre's mission is to restore the Outlawz to their former glory. The gang clashes with the police, as well as two more rival gangs, the KYC and the Pogue Mahones.

Upon discovering that the Outlawz' leader, Big Dog, plans to abandon them to join the Headhunterz, Tre attacks and kills him to take his place as the head of the gang. The story ends with Tre killing each Headhunter, including their leader. The gang also executes the police chief. The game ends on an ambiguous cliffhanger; during Tre's last fight with Justiss, he is shot multiple times at close range. After fatally shooting Justiss, Tre collapses and seemingly dies. But when the police arrive, only Justiss' corpse remains. Tre's body is gone and the police list 2 suspects still at large, strongly indicating that he possibly survived.

== Gameplay ==
A fight encounter taking place in the game

The game is a fictionalized simulation of gang wars, with the gameplay focused on street fights involving multiple gang members at once. The player has several weapons they can use, including baseball bats, lead pipes, hammers, and guns. The game includes over 25 story-mode missions, as well as some free-play missions.

A free roam gameplay style is also available, similar to the style seen in the popular game Grand Theft Auto. The free roam areas are relatively small but can prove useful when trying to locate your fellow gang members. The game's music is all hip-hop, reflecting the urban and hip-hop atmosphere of the game.

== Reception ==
Reception

Aggregate score
Aggregator	Score		
Aggregator	PC	PS2	Xbox
Metacritic	30/100	35/100	30/100

Review scores
Publication	Score		
Publication	PC	PS2	Xbox
Electronic Gaming Monthly	N/A	N/A	2/10
GamePro	N/A	N/A	1.5/5
GameSpot	2.1/10	N/A	2.1/10
GameSpy	N/A	1/5	1/5
GameZone	N/A	N/A	3.5/10
IGN	N/A	N/A	3.9/10
PlayStation Official Magazine – UK	N/A	4/10	N/A
Official Xbox Magazine (US)	N/A	N/A	1.5/10
PC Gamer (UK)	40%	N/A	N/A
X-Play	N/A	N/A	1/5

Crime Life: Gang Wars received "unfavorable" reviews on all platforms according to the review aggregation website Metacritic. IGN gave the Xbox version in a negative review, stating that "In addition to weak gameplay, the visuals are reminiscent of the first wave of Xbox games when the system was released, and the sound effects aren't much better," though IGN praised the soundtrack.
