= Cutthroats: Terror on the High Seas =

1999 video game

- Developer: Hothouse Creations
- Publisher: Eidos Interactive
- Composer: Allister Brimble
- Platform: Microsoft Windows
- Release: NA: September 17, 1999; EU: September 30, 1999
- Genre: Strategy
- Mode: Single-player

Cutthroats: Terror on the High Seas, also known as simply Cutthroats, is a real time strategy game developed by Hothouse Creations and published by Eidos Interactive in 1999.

== Gameplay ==
The game is set in the 17th century in the Caribbean and unlike most pirate games, it is mostly historically accurate. The game world is covered with settlements according to the time period the player picks at the start (and evolves accordingly as the game progresses) and each settlement is ruled by one of the five new world powers, Spain, England, France, The Netherlands and Denmark. Also some settlements are ruled at certain times by independent rulers, e.g. Tortuga and Belize. These settlements can be attacked by the player, meaning his crew, with weapons the player chose, will land at the town and can then be controlled to burn and pillage it. Other than this the player controls a ship unit upon a map of the Spanish Main and can plot courses to pins which represent towns; however, if an NPC ship is close enough to the player (these ships spawn at the settlements with goals such as trade between towns or to find pirates), the player will be alerted and go into a smaller bird's-eye map in which they can raise flags to either enter diplomacy with the ship such as asking for information, raise nation flags to avoid them, or obviously raise the Jolly Roger to attack them. Ship combat is worked much as town combat with the player controlling his ship(s) with advanced controls such as where to aim cannon, and what type of shot, right down to scuttling the ship or setting it ablaze.

Between battles the player is forced to sail places to maintain his ship; once at a town the player has a great deal of options such as buying supplies, buying new ships, making repairs, and visiting the governor. Sequences with the governor allow the player to gain fame with a nation and ultimately become a privateer; the player can also receive missions and treasure maps. The player also has the option of landing at beaches visible on the bird's-eye screen where they can bury their own treasure and carry out repairs or wait for an enemy ship to sail past.

Cutthroats' goal is for the player to amass enough loot to be able to split it between him and his crew, so that they may retire wealthy; however, after this the player can continue to take other voyages with his infamy or fame intact, which go up due to the player's acts: for example, killing all the civilians of a captured town gets a lot of infamy where winning battles gets fame. Fame is a benefit, causing some weak opponents to surrender without a fight. Infamy tends to attract the attention of pirate hunters. The player can also technically "lose" the game by having their fleet sunk in battle or themselves be arrested in a town. There is also the possibility of a ship's crew mutinying against you.

== Reception ==
Reception

Aggregate score
Aggregator	Score
GameRankings	56%

Review scores
Publication	Score
AllGame	3/5
CNET Gamecenter	4/10
Computer Games Strategy Plus	2/5
Computer Gaming World	2/5
GamePro	4/5
GameRevolution	B
GameSpot	5.6/10
GameSpy	37%
IGN	6.2/10
PC Accelerator	3/10
PC Gamer (UK)	40%
PC Zone	68%

The game received mixed reviews according to the review aggregation website GameRankings.

IGN said of the game's lasting appeal, "It's got near infinite replayability but after a while the bugs will get to you and the game will seem a little flat. The lack of any multiplayer element only makes matters worse."

GameSpot said, "If you're into micromanagement and can stand simplified combat and poor graphics, Cutthroats should provide you with enough to keep you happy for a while. But if you're looking for a game that re-creates the drama and violence of 17th-century pirating, you won't find it here."

GameRevolution said, "The game as a whole is a complex one. But the designers did a very good job of integrating the complexity seamlessly and fairly invisibly. You do have to micro-manage your ships and cargo, and the interface to do so could use a bit of streamlining. But other than that, Cutthroats offers a rewarding take on buccaneering."
