= Gangsters 2 =

2001 video game

Gangsters 2: Vendetta
- Developer: Hothouse Creations
- Publishers: Eidos Interactive; Trymedia Systems Inc.
- Platform: Microsoft Windows
- Release: EU: June 1, 2001; NA: June 5, 2001
- Genre: Strategy
- Modes: Single-player, multiplayer

Gangsters 2: Vendetta is a real-time strategy video game, developed by Hothouse Creations, published by Eidos Interactive, and released for Microsoft Windows in June 2001. The sequel to Gangsters: Organized Crime, and set during the final years of Prohibition, the game focuses on a story of the son of a local mob boss, who goes on a vendetta against the men who ordered their assassination, effectively becoming their own mob boss in the process. The game received mixed reviews on release.

== Gameplay ==
The game operates in real-time, compared to its predecessor, with the interface operating in three different modes: isometric, allowing the player to watch their current location and view events on the street; and two top down modes, one allowing players to see where every gangster, law enforcement official, businesses and rackets are, as well as the territory each gang controls, while the other gives a larger scale view of the map. The game focuses on players using gangsters to perform various tasks, such as attacking rival gangs, bombing businesses, and securing territory, while contending with attacks on their own territory and businesses, while avoiding or countering interference from the police and the FBI, who can disrupt their operations.

In Gangsters 2, each member of the player's gang can have up to four hoods to assist them, improving their firepower and providing a shield from attacks, and have access to a specialised skill – bombing, kidnapping, assassination, charmer, bank robbery and getaway driver – which can be used to help in a variety of ways: a charmer can use his influence to reduce the threat of police officers, while a bomber can use explosives either on cars to kill rival gangster or to bomb rival businesses. Gangsters can be equipped with a variety of weapons, including revolvers, shotguns, dual pistols, submachine guns, and rifles, and use a selection of vehicles to travel around a map more quickly and perform drive-by shootings, and can rest in secured businesses to recover any health lost. Attacking rival gang members as well as law enforcement increases a gang member's notoriety; too much, and they face being arrested or killed by the police and FBI.

To maintain an income to pay for gangsters, hoods and guards, players can acquire businesses on the map, either buying them legally, or be seizing them from rivals by attacking them, which also gives them control of the territory it maintains. Some businesses, when owned, can house an illegal racket (such as gambling dens, and brothels), which increases the income the site produces. However, rackets require a business specialist to run them; in addition, most rackets also require the player to supply alcohol from illegal breweries and stills for them to function. Players must be careful when setting up a racket, as they can be raided by the FBI if they are tipped off to them, as well as become prime targets for rival gangs.

In the single-player mode, the player assumes the role of a gangster, and must complete objectives in each mission of the game's campaign within a set time limit, ranging from securing assets to eliminating rivals. Missions are failed if the player runs out of time, or if their main gangster is killed, imprisoned, or goes bankrupt; some missions are also failed if certain conditions are not met. Between missions, the player can recruit new gangsters and business specialists to their gang, fire those they do not need, and improve their skills with skill points earned from a mission; for each mission, the player must decide which gangsters and specialists to bring, based on the briefing given at the start.

== Plot ==
=== Setting ===
The game's is set during the late 1920s, towards the final years of Prohibition, within the fictional US state of Temperance. The state lies on the northern mid-west region of the country, split into several counties, with its state capital being New Temperance City (the same fictional setting as Gangsters). The game's main campaign sees players assume the role of Joey Bane, a small-time mobster, who travels across the state to form his own empire.

=== Story ===
In 1928, Italian-American mobster Joey Bane swears vengenance on mob boss Cain 'Stoneface' Langham, after he orders the assassination of Joey's father for disrupting his plans to expand his bootlegging operation in the small town of Buffalo Falls. Aided by his uncle, who was nearly killed in the assassination and offers to be his nephew's advisor, Joey creates his own gang, killing Langham's muscle in the town. He eventually expands out of Buffalo Falls to weaken his target's racket operations, until he finally corners and kill Langham, taking full control of his territory in the county.

Following Langham's death, Joey is contacted by Frankie "Hammer" Constantine, the state's most powerful mob boss, who he realizes ordered his father's death when he opposed Constantine's bootlegging operations. To get close to him, Joey works for him, dealing with mobsters who refuse to serve for Constantine, securing their territory for his own empire. Eventually, with enough resources, he moves into Constantine's territory, angering the mob boss. This prompts Joey to build his empire carefully as he moves towards New Temperance, Constantine's stronghold, combatting threats from hitmen, corrupt police chiefs and church priests, and even trouble from demobbed army soldiers.

Eventually, Joey weakens Constantine's power base, reducing his cash flow, and kidnapping his book keeper who is handed over to the FBI. With his position threatened, Constantine attempts to secure help from mob bosses outside the state, in exchange for territory. Joey prevents this, hits Constantine, and finally kills him. With his vendetta completed, he begins his new life as the state's most powerful crime lord, though his uncle hints at the possibility of someone likely challenging his position someday in the future.

== Reception ==
Reception

Aggregate score
Aggregator	Score
Metacritic	61/100

Review scores
Publication	Score
Computer Gaming World	1.5/5
Edge	7/10
EP Daily	6/10
Game Informer	4/10
GameRevolution	D+
GameSpot	5.4/10
GameSpy	53%
GameZone	6/10
IGN	5.7/10
Next Generation	2/5
PC Gamer (US)	69%

The game received "mixed" reviews according to the review aggregation website Metacritic. Daniel Erickson of NextGen called it "Another bad stab at a goodfella's idea."
