= American Idol (video game) =

2003 video game

Pop Idol
- North American PlayStation 2 cover art
- Developers: Hothouse Creations; Möbius Entertainment (GBA)
- Publisher: Codemasters
- Platforms: PlayStation 2, Microsoft Windows, Game Boy Advance
- Release: PlayStation 2: EU: November 7, 2003; NA: November 11, 2003; Microsoft Windows: EU: November 7, 2003; NA: November 18, 2003; Game Boy Advance: NA: November 18, 2003; EU: November 21, 2003
- Genre: Rhythm
- Modes: Single-player, multiplayer

American Idol (Pop Idol in the United Kingdom) is a rhythm video game developed by Hothouse Creations and published by Codemasters for PlayStation 2, Microsoft Windows and Game Boy Advance. It is based on the reality talent show franchise Idol. The American version uses footage from the second season of the show, in which Ruben Studdard won the season. An Xbox version was planned and advertised in Germany and the UK in 2004 but cancelled.

== Reception ==
Reception

Aggregate score
Aggregator	Score		
Aggregator	GBA	PC	PS2
Metacritic	N/A	39/100	41/100

Review scores
Publication	Score		
Publication	GBA	PC	PS2
Electronic Gaming Monthly	N/A	N/A	1.5/10
Game Informer	N/A	N/A	6.25/10
GameSpot	N/A	4.7/10	5.1/10
IGN	N/A	3.3/10	4/10
Nintendo Power	3.2/5	N/A	N/A
Official U.S. PlayStation Magazine	N/A	N/A	1/5
PC Gamer (UK)	N/A	30%	N/A
X-Play	N/A	N/A	1/5

Pop Idol received "generally unfavorable" reviews for its PC and PS2 versions, according to review aggregator Metacritic. The Game Boy Advance version did not receive enough reviews to reach a consensus.

X-Play gave the game's PS2 version a 1 out of 5, complaining about the gameplay consisting of pressing buttons in time to judge the character's singing and not on the player's actual singing. IGN's Ed Lewis was similarly negative, criticizing the game for having "no singing ability required and only minimal rhythmic ability", the extremely simplistic button inputs, and the lack of any reward for completion of the game, ultimately giving the game 4/10 and stating anyone who bought it had been "duped".

Nintendo Power's reviewers gave the GBA version of the game an overall score of 3.2 out of 5.

== Related games ==
In addition to the release of Karaoke Revolution Presents: American Idol for the PlayStation 2 on January 2, 2007, a sequel Karaoke Revolution Presents: American Idol Encore was released during the 1st quarter of 2008 following its direct sequel Karaoke Revolution Presents: American Idol Encore 2 which was released on November 18, 2008.

An iPhone application entitled American Idol: The Game was released on the App Store. It was released by Electronic Arts on July 3, 2009. Omaha Sternberg of Macworld rated the game 4.5 out of 5 stars. The application has received mixed reviews from its users.
