= Eileen Hunt Botting =

American political theorist

Eileen Margaret Hunt Botting (Eileen M. Hunt)

Education
- Education: Yale University (PhD); Cambridge University (MA); Bowdoin College (BA)

Philosophical work
- Institutions: University of Notre Dame
- Main interests: Political Philosophy, Literature, Feminism

Eileen Margaret Hunt (born 1971) is an American political theorist and professor of political science. She works on political thought from the 17th century to the present. She is a professor at the University of Notre Dame and has published five solo-authored books and edited another six books. In 2021, she returned to publishing with the author name, Eileen M. Hunt, with the essay "Dracula's Daughter: the rediscovery of a love poem for George Orwell" in The TLS.

== Early life and education ==
Hunt (Botting), raised in Massachusetts and Maine, studied English, Philosophy, and Ancient Greek at Bowdoin College.

In 1992 she received a Marshall Scholarship to continue her studies in the United Kingdom, where she studied philosophy from 1993 to 1995 at St. John's College, Cambridge. In 2001, she earned her Ph.D. with distinction at Yale University in the Department of Political Science, with a focus on feminist political philosophy and the history of modern political thought.

== Career ==
In 2009 she was the recipient of the Colonial Society of Massachusetts Award from the New England Regional Fellowship Consortium; in 2012, the triennial Edition Award from the Society for the Study of American Women Writers, with Sarah L. Houser, for their scholarly edition of Reminiscences and Traditions of Boston by Hannah Mather Crocker; in 2014, the Okin-Young award for the best article published in feminist political theory in the previous year; in 2015, an American Council of Learned Societies Fellowship for her project Frankenstein and the Question of Human Development; and in 2019, a recipient of an Alfred P. Sloan Foundation book grant in the Public Understanding of Science, Technology, and Economics Program to support her work on Political Science Fictions after 'Frankenstein': Mary Shelley and the Politics of Making Artificial Life and Intelligence. This is the subject of her fourth solo-authored book, Artificial Life After Frankenstein, published in December 2020. She has also edited the two-volume set, Portraits of Wollstonecraft (2021), for Bloomsbury Philosophy.

In 2022, Hunt (Botting)'s Artificial Life After Frankenstein won the David Easton Award from the Foundations of Political Theory Section of the American Political Science Association, for "a book that broadens the horizons of contemporary political science by engaging issues of philosophical significance in political life through any of a variety of approaches in the social sciences and humanities." She was also awarded a 2022 Carr-Thomas-Ovenden Fellowship in English Literature at the Bodleian Library to complete research for The First Last Man: Mary Shelley and the Post-Apocalyptic Imagination., the concluding volume in her trilogy on Mary Shelley and political philosophy for Penn Press (2024).

In 2024-27, she is the principal investigator for an NEH Scholarly Editions grant for creating an integrated standard edition of Wollstonecraft’s ‘Rights of Men’ and ‘Rights of Woman’ for Oxford University Press.

== Publications ==
=== Authored ===
- Artificial Life After Frankenstein, University of Pennsylvania Press, 2020
- Mary Shelley and the Rights of the Child: Political Philosophy in 'Frankenstein', University of Pennsylvania Press, 2017
- Wollstonecraft, Mill, and Women's Human Rights, Yale University Press, 2016
- Family Feuds: Wollstonecraft, Burke, and Rousseau on the Transformation of the Family, The State University of New York Press, 2006
- The First Last Man: Mary Shelley and the Postapocalyptic Imagination, University of Pennsylvania Press, 2024

=== Edited ===
- with Jill Locke, Feminist Interpretations of Alexis de Tocqueville, Penn State, 2009
- with Sarah L. Houser, Reminiscences and Traditions of Boston by Hannah Mather Crocker, NEHGS, 2011
- A Vindication of the Rights of Woman by Mary Wollstonecraft, with new scholarly essays by Virginia Sapiro, Norma Clarke, Ruth Abbey, Eileen Hunt Botting, and Madeline Cronin, Yale University Press, 2014
- with Sandrine Berges and Alan Coffee, The Wollstonecraftian Mind, Routledge, 2019
- Portraits of Wollstonecraft, 2 vols., Bloomsbury Philosophy, 2021
- Editor, Mary Wollstonecraft Shelley’s ‘The Last Man and The Journal of Sorrow’ (Oxford University Press, 2026)
