= Le Dernier Homme =

1800 novel by Jean-Baptiste Cousin de Grainville

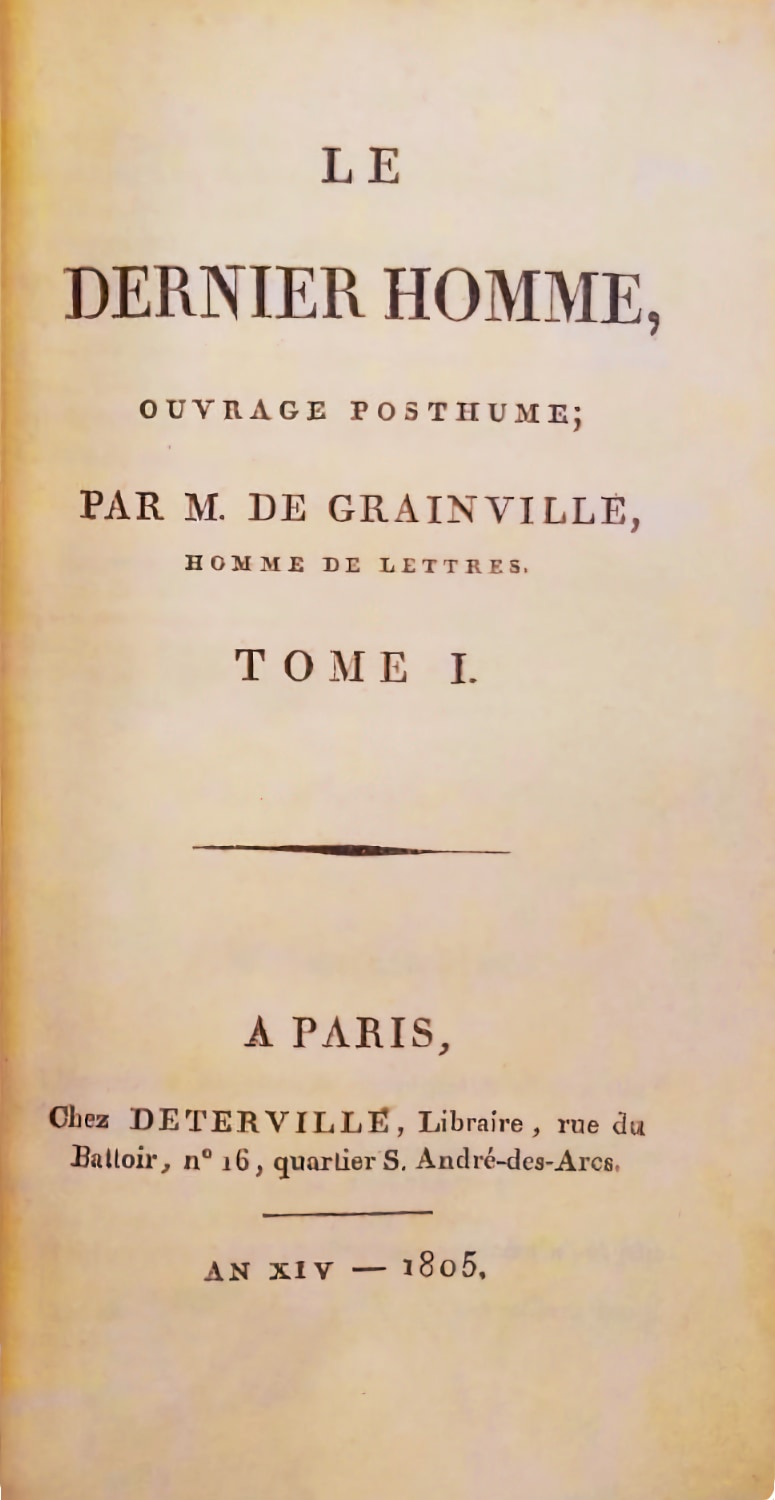
- Title page of 1805 first edition of Le Dernier Homme
- Author: Jean-Baptiste Cousin de Grainville
- Language: French
- Genre: Fantasy, science fiction, Dying Earth
- Publisher: Deterville
- Publication date: 1805
- Publication place: France
- Media type: Print

Le Dernier Homme (English: The Last Man) is a French science fantasy novel in the form of a prose poem. Written by Jean-Baptiste Cousin de Grainville and published in 1805, it was the first story of modern speculative fiction to depict the end of the world. Considered a seminal early work of science fantasy, specifically of the Dying Earth genre, it has been described by Gary K. Wolfe as "A crucial document in the early history... of what became science fiction".

In 1806, Le Dernier Homme was poorly translated into English as Omegarus and Syderia, a Romance in Futurity. The edition did not credit Grainville as author or indicate the text was a translation. This translation remained the only English version available until 2003, when a new translation by I.F. and Margaret Clarke was published.

== Creation and publication ==
De Grainville was inspired by Milton's epic poem Paradise Lost. Where Milton's work featured the first couple, Adam and Eve, de Grainville writes of the last couple – Omegarus and Syderia. Influences from the Biblical Book of Revelation are also seen in the concept that the earth has a predestined day of ending. The influence of Malthusian ideas is also seen, as de Grainville writes at one point of an earth out of balance, population outstripping resources.

The work was published in 1805 due to the advocacy of the French literary figure Jacques-Henri Bernardin de Saint-Pierre, who persuaded the Paris publisher Deterville to offer the book. By the time the book was published, de Grainville was dead, a suicide in February of that year. The first publication failed to attract any critical notice or sales, but was championed by Herbert Croft, who published a second edition in two volumes, in 1811. This second edition did garner the attention of critics, who praised it.

== Plot ==
The story is told by a spirit to a young man who comes upon its cave while traveling in Syria. The protagonist, Omegarus, is the son of the King of Europe and the last child born there in a far future in which the earth is becoming sterile and the human ability to reproduce is fading. He sees a vision of Syderia, the last fertile woman. She lives in Brazil, so he travels there in an airship. After various adventures there, including meeting Ormus, the Spirit of Earth, who urges the two to begin a rebirth of the human race, Omegarus returns to Europe with Syderia by his side. There they meet Adam, the first man, who has been condemned by God to watch all the damned among his descendants enter Hell, and who is now charged with persuading Omegarus and Syderia not to prolong the life of humanity, which God has determined must now end. He succeeds in having Omegarus leave Syderia, who then dies. Ormus, who cannot survive without humanity, despairs, and the world begins to end and the graves of all the dead to open, initiating the eventual Rapture and the events described in the Book of Revelation.

== Works inspired ==
Le Dernier Homme inspired three other works.

- Le Dernier Homme, poème imité de Grainville (The Last Man, a Poem Inspired by Grainville) is an 1832 work by Auguste Creuzé de Lesser, which expands on Grainville's original, describing aerial cities and a failed attempt at leaving Earth to colonize another planet.
- L’Unitéide ou la Femme messie (The Unitéide, or the Female Messiah), a mammoth and epic philosophical poem by Etienne-Paulin Gagne published in 1858, sees the return of the character of Omegarus (under the name Omegar). In the work (set in the year 2000), God sends a female messiah to save the world.
- Omégar ou le Dernier Homme (Omegare, or the Last Man), published the following year by Gagne's wife Élise Gagne, is another poetic epic about the final days of the Earth.

The work known as Omegarus and Syderia did circulate somewhat in London, and several contemporary reviewers noticed resemblances between it and subsequent eschatological works: Byron's "Darkness" (1816) and Mary Shelley's The Last Man (1826). Whether Byron or Shelly were indeed influenced by, or even read, Omegarus and Syderia is not known.
