= Abomination: The Nemesis Project =

1999 video game

- Developer: Hothouse Creations
- Publisher: Eidos Interactive
- Composer: Allister Brimble
- Platform: Microsoft Windows
- Release: NA: November 3, 1999; EU: 1999
- Genres: Action, real-time tactics
- Modes: Single-player, multiplayer

Abomination: The Nemesis Project, released in the United States as Abomination, is a real-time tactics/action video game released in 1999. In the game, the player leads a team of eight genetically altered super soldiers (marines) to defeat an infestation of a global genetic plague which slowly turns into a superorganism.

Abomination was met with mixed reception, with the game's poor A.I. being the primary grievance among critics and players.

== Plot ==
Abomination takes place in 1999 after the United States has been almost wiped out by a deadly plague. The disease started on the east coast, and communication with the west coast ceased within 72 hours. The last few groups of survivors stopped broadcasting after six days, and the overwhelming majority of the country's population has been wiped out.

Most of the remaining survivors have pledged allegiance to an apocalyptic and ultra-violent cult known as "The Faithful", a religion whose followers practice mortification of the flesh, as well as vivisecting themselves and others to prove the strength of their beliefs. The Faithful are revealed to be at least several hundred years old, possibly originating from Tibet. The cult predicts the coming of "The Brood" and "the Elder Gods" in a Lovecraftian fashion. The game's backstory also mentions that The Faithful are somehow connected with a strange and very old statuette, called "The Princess of Death", which resembles a cross between a Black Madonna and a prehistoric depiction of the mother goddess. Shortly before the plague first broke out, the US government suspected that the Faithful had either stolen the statue from the unspecified museum where it was kept, or that through their rituals, they caused it to explode there, perhaps disseminating one or more biological agents hidden inside. The game's opening cutscene contains no words but suggests that the statuette may have been part of a meteorite which struck the earth long ago. The cutscene also shows the Oval Office with a figure resembling President Bill Clinton, who has collapsed and died while still at his desk—within moments after he signed and issued the written orders for the emergency response plan "Project Nemesis", which can be seen in a folder there.

The game takes place in a large, unnamed coastal city, which remains mostly undamaged but plagued by odd biological matter, ranging from tentacles growing out of the sidewalk to huge, three-story towers of tissue. The player controls members of "The Nemesis Project", who according to the backstory were originally mustered at a secret base in a fictional location called "Kinmore Field" in Ohio. These supersoldiers are black operatives who have been enhanced through the use of surgical procedures and experimental nanotechnology, as part of a last-ditch effort to find a way to eliminate The Faithful and put an end to the plague. This is why the characters have pseudoscientific special abilities and, presumably, immune systems capable of protecting them from the plague. The cutscene shows the soldiers being revived by a failsafe mechanism that automatically brings them out from cryogenic suspension. Surviving military or police personnel are also recruited into the player's roster, and they have no superpowers, but do possess specialized weapons training.

== Development ==
Development started in 1996 under producer Steve Goss. Programmers included Charles Bocock and Terry Mancey. Artists included Stuart Griffin.

Originally started with bitmapped characters and NPCs, it proved to be impossible to store the amount of artwork necessary for every angle of every animation in the memory of PCs at the time, and the decision was made to implement a 3D engine to render the characters, while retaining the bitmapped isometric background.

== Reception ==
Reception

Aggregate score
Aggregator	Score
GameRankings	64%

Review scores
Publication	Score
AllGame	3/5
Computer Games Strategy Plus	3.5/5
Computer Gaming World	2/5
EP Daily	4/10
GamePro	3.5/5
GameSpot	6.5/10
GameSpy	79%
GameZone	7/10
IGN	5/10
Next Generation	2/5
PC Accelerator	4/10
PC Gamer (US)	34%

The game received mixed reviews according to the review aggregation website GameRankings. Chris Charla of NextGen said, "As much as we liked the look of Abomination, the sad reality is that it simply isn't much fun to play. If you can find a few copies in the bargain bin, though, multiplayer is well worth a try."
