= Judgment: Apocalypse Survival Simulation =

2018 video game

Judgment: Apocalype Survival Simulation
- Developer: Suncrash
- Publisher: Suncrash
- Designers: Tomer Barkan, Harel Eilam
- Artist: Yoni Wisner
- Composer: Alon Kaplan
- Engine: Unity
- Platform: Windows
- Release: May 3, 2018
- Genres: Base management, survival, real-time strategy
- Mode: Single Player

Judgment: Apocalypse Survival Simulation is a colony simulation game with tactical combat and survival elements, developed by the Israeli indie company Suncrash. The game was initially released as alpha software on Steam Early Access on April 11, 2016, for Microsoft Windows. In Judgment: Apocalypse Survival Simulation the player controls a colony of survivors in an ongoing Apocalypse. After surviving an encounter with a demon, three survivors build a base in an isolated valley in order to resist the invasion and survive.

== Gameplay ==
Judgment: Apocalypse Survival Simulation puts the player in control of a group of survivors with the ultimate goal to stop an ongoing Apocalypse. First, survivors need to eat, drink and sleep, and for that they build a sustainable base and defend it against demon attacks. The economy of the base is one of the most important parts of the game: survivors have to farm, mine, plant or scavenge different basic resources – and use them to build facilities, craft equipment, and research for technologies and magic. Survivors have different professions, making them more efficient in some tasks than others; they can also gain experience and level up to improve their skills. There are also different random events that serve as a sort of side missions, such as having to gather some resources in order to perform a ritual to remove a curse. In the end, victory can only be achieved by researching for a way to close the Hellgate that the demons are using to enter the world.

Apart from the colony management and economy simulation mechanics, Judgment: Apocalypse Survival Simulation features tactical combat, both going to combat missions to the outside world and defending the base against demon attacks. In the combat missions, the player sends a group of survivors to different locations in a randomly generated world map. The group of survivors can be equipped with melee and ranged weapons, armors and other items (such as Molotov cocktail or spells). In all the combat missions, the squad faces different types of demons, each with different combat styles, weaknesses, and strengths. Combat missions can be won by achieving their goals (for instance, rescuing a trapped survivor) or killing all enemies in the map. As is common in survival games, death is permanent. If all the survivors in a mission party die, the mission is lost.

== Development ==
=== Conception and design ===
Judgment: Apocalypse Survival Simulation is being developed by Suncrash, an Israeli-based independent video game developer. Their core team worked in different fields before founding Suncrash; Judgment is the studio's first game. Suncrash quote the X-COM franchise (original and new) as one of the main inspirations for the game along with Rimworld. Its final release date is still to be announced.

=== Releases and updates ===
Judgment's first public alpha version (alpha 5) was released on April 11, 2016, on Steam Early Access. Since then Suncrash has released 6 major updates for the game, featuring new game mechanics such as character professions and new combat missions.

== Reception ==
Reception

Aggregate score
Aggregator	Score
Metacritic	72/100

Judgment: Apocalypse Survival Simulation has received generally favorable reviews so far, praising its "exciting blend of gameplay" between "turn based strategy, role-playing and resource management". Its setting has also been lauded as "interesting and original". There are mixed opinions on its art style; while some talk about the game having "a fair amount of detail", others were unconvinced by its art style.
