= Jean-Baptiste Cousin de Grainville =

French writer (1746–1805)

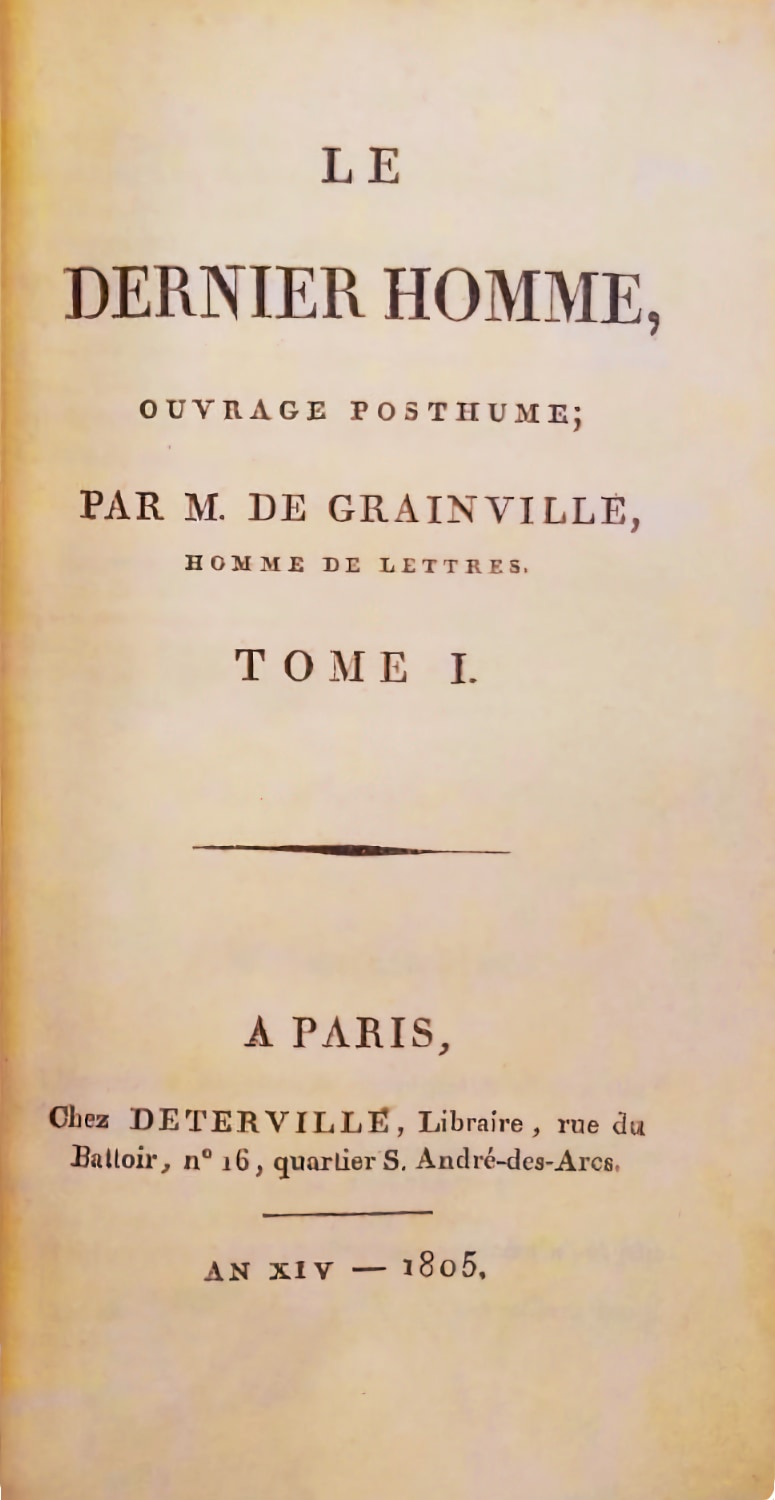
Princeps edition of Le Dernier Homme by Déterville in Paris, An XIV.

Jean-Baptiste François Xavier Cousin De Grainville (3 April 1746 – 1 February 1805) was a French writer who wrote a seminal work of fantasy literature: Le Dernier Homme (The Last Man) (1805). This was the first modern novel to depict the end of the world.

The son of an army staff officer, de Grainville was born in Le Havre and was destined for the priesthood, like his brother, who became Bishop of Cahors. After attending school in Caen, he attended the Lycée Louis-le-Grand in Paris. De Grainville was ordained a priest in 1766 but left the priesthood during the French Revolution. He committed suicide at Amiens in 1805 and his novel was published posthumously.

== Bibliography ==
- Joseph François, Michaud, ed. (1857). Biographie universelle, ancienne et moderne [Encyclopedia of Ancient and Modern Biography] (in French). Vol. 17. Paris: Michaud frères. pp. 315–316.
- Ash, Brian, ed. (1977). The Visual Encyclopedia of Science Fiction. New York: Harmony Books. p. 132.
- Jean Gillet, « Du dernier au premier homme : Le brouillage des signes dans l’épopée de Grainville », Formes modernes de la poésie épique : nouvelles approches, éd. et intro. par Judith Labarthe, Bruxelles, Peter Lang, 2004, (p. 113-27).
- (in English) Morton D. Paley, « Le Dernier Homme : the French Revolution as the failure of typology », Mosaic, hiver 1991, n°24 (1), (p. 67-76).
