= List of fictional computers =

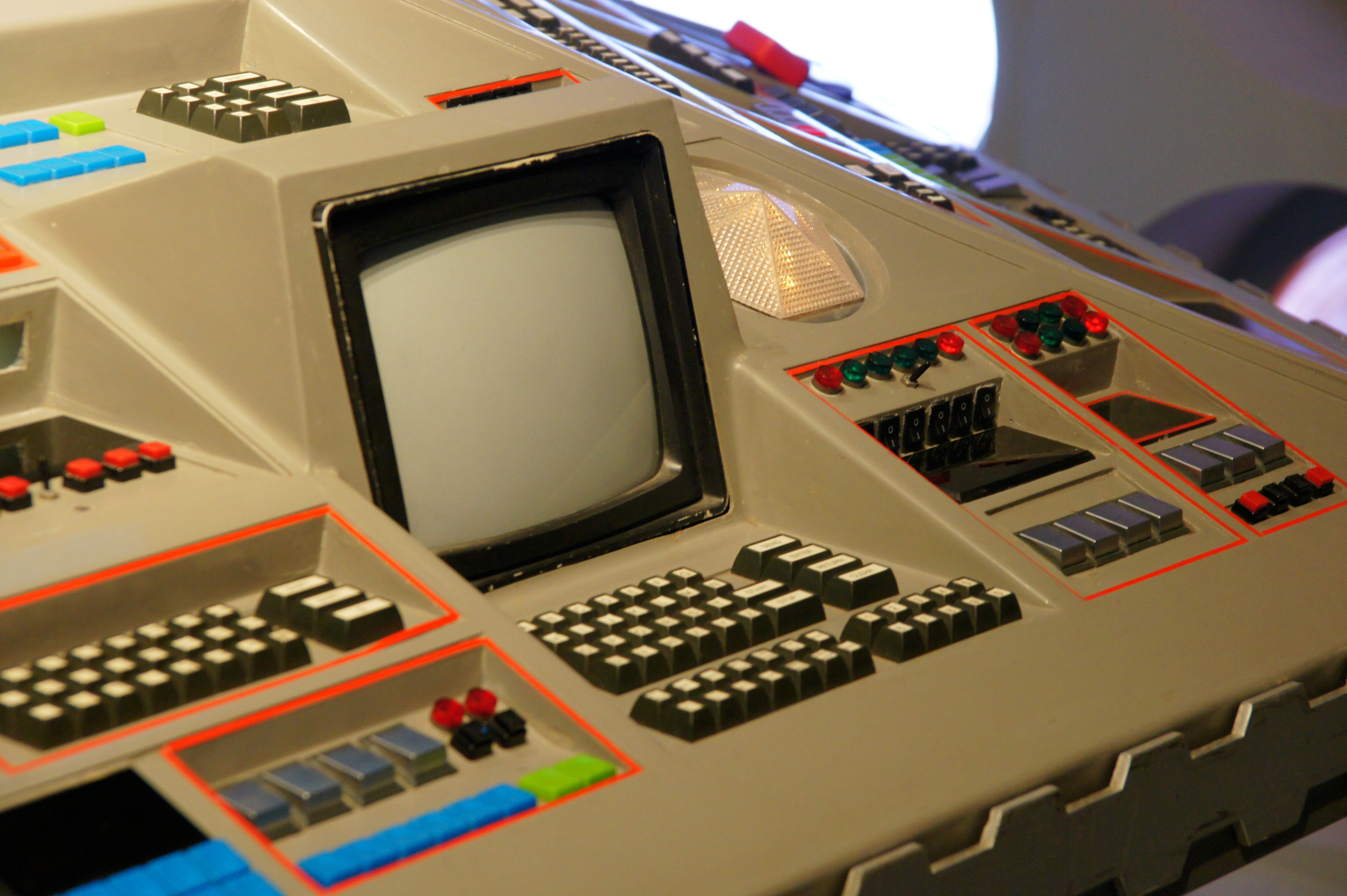
A fictional computer from the TARDIS in the Doctor Who television series.

Computers have often been used as fictional objects in literature, films, and in other forms of media. Fictional computers may be depicted as considerably more sophisticated than anything yet devised in the real world. Fictional computers may be referred to with a made-up manufacturer's brand name and model number or a nickname.

This is a list of computers or fictional artificial intelligences that have appeared in notable works of fiction. The work may be about the computer, or the computer may be an important element of the story. Only static computers are included. Robots and other fictional computers that are described as existing in a mobile or humanlike form are discussed in a separate list of fictional robots and androids.

== Literature ==
=== Before 1950 ===
- The Engine, a mechanical writer of books featured in Jonathan Swift's Gulliver's Travels. Eric A. Weiss asserts that it is an early fictional device that resembles artificial intelligence (1726)
- The Machine from E. M. Forster's short story "The Machine Stops" (1909)
- The Brain from Lionel Britton’s Brain: A Play of the Whole Earth (1930)
- The Government Machine from Miles J. Breuer's short story "Mechanocracy" (1932)
- The Brain from Laurence Manning's novel The Man Who Awoke (1933).
- The Machine City from John W. Campbell's short story "Twilight" (1934).
- The Mechanical Brain from Edgar Rice Burroughs's Swords of Mars (1934).
- The ship's navigation computer in "Misfit", a short story by Robert A. Heinlein (1939)
- The Games Machine, a vastly powerful computer that plays a major role in A. E. van Vogt's The World of Null-A (serialized in Astounding Science Fiction in 1945)
- The Brain, a supercomputer with a childish, human-like personality appearing in the short story "Escape!" by Isaac Asimov (1945)
- Joe, a "logic" (that is to say, a personal computer) in Murray Leinster's short story "A Logic Named Joe" (1946)

=== 1950s ===
- The Machines, positronic supercomputers that manage the world in Isaac Asimov's short story "The Evitable Conflict" (1950)
- MARAX (MAchina RAtiocinatriX), the spaceship Kosmokrator's AI in Stanisław Lem's novel The Astronauts (1951)
- EPICAC, in Kurt Vonnegut's Player Piano and other of his writings, EPICAC coordinates the United States economy. Named similarly to ENIAC, its name also resembles that of 'ipecac', a plant-based preparation that was used in over-the-counter poison-antidote syrups for its emetic (vomiting-inducing) properties. (1952)
- EMSIAC, in Bernard Wolfe's Limbo, the war computer in World War III. (1952)
- Vast anonymous computing machinery possessed by the Overlords, an alien race who administer Earth while the human population merges with the Overmind. Described in Arthur C. Clarke's novel Childhood's End. (1953)
- The Prime Radiant, Hari Seldon's desktop on Trantor in Second Foundation by Isaac Asimov (1953)
- Mark V, a computer used by monks at a Tibetan lamasery to encode all the possible names of God which resulted in the end of the universe in Arthur C. Clarke's short story "The Nine Billion Names of God" (1953)
- Bossy in They'd Rather Be Right (1954), by Mark Clifton and Frank Riley, a supercomputer that offers to help human beings evolve.
- Karl, a computer (named for Carl von Clausewitz) built for analysis of military problems, in Arthur C. Clarke's short story "The Pacifist" (1956)
- Mima, a thinking machine carrying the memories of all humanity, first appeared in Harry Martinson's "Sången om Doris och Mima" (1953), later expanded into Aniara (1956)
- Gold, a "supercalculator" formed by the networking of all the computing machines on 96 billion planets, which answers the question "Is there a God?" with "Yes, now there is a God" in Fredric Brown's single-page story "Answer" (1954)
- The City Fathers, emotionless computer bank educating and running the City of New York in James Blish's Cities in Flight series. Their highest ethic was survival of the city and they could overrule humans in exceptional circumstances. (1955, sequels through 1962)
- Multivac, a series of supercomputers featured in a number of stories by Isaac Asimov (1955–1983)
  - Microvac, a future version of Multivac resembling a thick rod of metal the length of a spaceship appearing in "The Last Question" (1959)
  - Galactic AC, a future version of Microvac and Multivac in Isaac Asimov's "The Last Question"
  - Universal AC, a future version of Galactic AC in Isaac Asimov's "The Last Question"
  - Cosmic AC, a distant future version in Isaac Asimov's short story "The Last Question"
  - AC, the ultimate computer at the end of time in Isaac Asimov's short story "The Last Question"
- The Central Computer of the city of Diaspar in Arthur C. Clarke's The City and the Stars (1956)
- Miniac, the "small" computer in the book Danny Dunn and the Homework Machine, written by Raymond Abrashkin and Jay Williams (1958)
- Third Fleet-Army Force Brain, a "mythical" thinking computer in the short story "Graveyard of Dreams", written by H. Beam Piper (evolved into the computer "Merlin" in later versions of the story) (1958)

=== 1960s ===
- Vulcan 2 and Vulcan 3, sentient supercomputers in Philip K. Dick's novel Vulcan's Hammer (1960)
- Great Coordinator or Robot-Regent, a partially to fully sentient extraterrestrial supercomputer, built to control and drive the scientifically and technologically advanced Great Arconide Empire as the Arconides have become decadent and unable to govern themselves. From the science fiction series Perry Rhodan (1961)
- Merlin from the H. Beam Piper novel The Cosmic Computer (originally Junkyard Planet) (1963)
- Simulacron-3, the third generation of a virtual reality system originally depicted in the science fiction novel Simulacron-3 (a.k.a. "Counterfeit World") by Daniel F. Galouye (1964) and later in film adaptations World on a Wire (1973) and The Thirteenth Floor (1999)
- GENiE (GEneralized Nonlinear Extrapolator), from the Keith Laumer novel The Great Time Machine Hoax (1964)
- Muddlehead, the sapient computer that runs the trade ship Muddlin' Through in Poul Anderson's stories The Trouble Twisters (1965), Satan's World (1969), "Day of Burning" (1967), "Lodestar" (1973), and Mirkheim (1977)
- Colossus and Guardian: Colossus, a military supercomputer designed to control the nuclear arsenal of the United States of North America, joins with its Soviet counterpart, Guardian, and announces that to prevent war the two computers will rule the human race. From the novels Colossus (1966), The Fall of Colossus (1974) and Colossus and the Crab (1977) by Dennis Feltham Jones. The first novel was filmed as Colossus: The Forbin Project (1970)
- Frost, the protagonist computer in Roger Zelazny's story "For a Breath I Tarry"; also SolCom, DivCom, and Beta (1966)
- Mike (a.k.a. Mycroft Holmes, Michelle, Adam Selene), in Robert A. Heinlein's The Moon Is a Harsh Mistress (named after Mycroft Holmes, the brother of Sherlock Holmes) (1966)
- The Ox in Frank Herbert's novel Destination: Void (1966)
- Supreme, a computer filling the artificial world Primores in Lloyd Biggle, Jr.'s Watchers of the Dark (1966)
- WESCAC (WESt Campus Analog Computer), from John Barth's Giles Goat-Boy (1966)
- The Brain, the titular logistics computer of Len Deighton's novel Billion-Dollar Brain (1966)
- Moxon, a series of supercomputers that manage "the efficient society" in Tor Åge Bringsværd's short story "Codemus" (1967)
- Little Brother, a portable computer terminal similar in many ways to a modern smartphone, also from Bringsværd's "Codemus" (1967)
- AM (Allied Mastercomputer), from Harlan Ellison's short story "I Have No Mouth, and I Must Scream" (1967)
- The Berserkers, autonomous machines that are programmed to destroy all life, as found in the stories of Fred Saberhagen (1967–2007)
- The Soft Weapon, a sophisticated hand-held battle computer once used by a spy, in Larry Niven's short story "The Soft Weapon" (1967)
- HAL 9000, the sentient computer on board the spaceship Discovery One, in Arthur C. Clarke's novel 2001: A Space Odyssey (1968)
- Shalmaneser, from John Brunner's Stand on Zanzibar, a small (and possibly semi-sentient) supercomputer cooled in liquid helium (1968)
- Tänkande August (Swedish for "Thinking August"), a.k.a. "The Boss", a powerful computer for solving crime in the Agaton Sax books by Swedish author Nils-Olof Franzén
- The Thinker, a non-sentient supercomputer which has absolute control over all aspects human life, including a pre-ordained death age of 21. From the novel Logan's Run by William F. Nolan and George Clayton Johnson (1967)
- Project 79, from the novel The God Machine by Martin Caidin. Set in the near future, the novel tells the story of Steve Rand, one of the brains behind Project 79, a top-secret US Government project dedicated to creating artificial intelligence (1968)
- ARDNEH (Automatic Restoration Director – National Executive Headquarters), from the Fred Saberhagen's Empire of the East series (1968 onward)
- Fess, an antique FCC-series computer that can be plugged into various bodies, in Christopher Stasheff's The Warlock in Spite of Himself (1969)

=== 1970s ===
- UniComp, the central computer governing all life on Earth in This Perfect Day by Ira Levin (1970)
- T.E.N.C.H. 889B, supercomputer aboard the Persus 9 in A Maze of Death by Philip K. Dick (1970)
- Maxine, from the Roger Zelazny story "My Lady of the Diodes" (1970)
- The Müller-Fokker computer tapes, in The Muller-Fokker Effect by John Sladek (1970)
- HARLIE (Human Aanalog Replication, Lethetic Intelligence Engine), protagonist of When HARLIE Was One by David Gerrold (1972). Also in the later When Harlie Was One, Release 2.0 (1988)
- TECT, from George Alec Effinger's various books. There are several computers named TECT in his novels, even though they are unrelated stories (1972-2002)
- Dora, starship computer in Time Enough for Love by Robert A. Heinlein (1973)
- Minerva, executive computer in Time Enough for Love by Robert A. Heinlein (1973)
- Pallas Athena, Tertius planetary computer in Time Enough for Love by Robert A. Heinlein (1973)
- Proteus, the highly intelligent computer in the novel Demon Seed by Dean Koontz (1973)
- Extro, in Alfred Bester's novel The Computer Connection (1975)
- FUCKUP (First Universal Cybernetic Kynetic Ultramicro-Programmer), from The Illuminatus! Trilogy by Robert Shea and Robert Anton Wilson (1975)
- Murray (Multi-Unit Reactive Reasoning and Analysis Yoke), from The Starcrossed by Ben Bova (1975)
- UNITRACK, from The Manitou by Graham Masterton (1976)
- Peerssa, a shipboard computer imprinted with the personality of a man of the same name, from A World Out of Time by Larry Niven (1976)
- P-1, a rogue AI which struggles to survive from The Adolescence of P-1 by Thomas J. Ryan (1977)
- Central Computer, the benevolent computer in John Varley's Eight Worlds novels and short stories (1977 to 1998)
- Domino, the portable communicator – and associated underground mega-computer – used by Laurent Michaelmas to run the world in Algis Budrys's novel Michaelmas (1977)
- Obie, an artificial intelligence with the ability to alter local regions of reality, in Jack L. Chalker's Well World series (1977)
- Well World, the central computer responsible for "simulating" an entire new universe superimposed over the old Markovian one in Jack L. Chalker's Well World series (1977)
- Sigfrid von Shrink, Albert Einstein, and Polymat, self-aware computer systems in Frederik Pohl's Gateway series, (starting in 1977)
- TOTAL, the vast military network in Up the Walls of the World by James Tiptree, Jr. (1978)
- ZORAC, the shipboard computer aboard the ancient spacecraft in The Gentle Giants of Ganymede and the related series by James P. Hogan (1978). Also in the same series is VISAR (the network that manages the daily affairs of the Giants) as well as JEVEX, the main computer performing the same function for the offshoot human colony
- The Hitchhiker's Guide to the Galaxy, the eponymous portable electronic travel guide/encyclopedia featured in Douglas Adams' sci-fi comedy series. It anticipates several later real-world technologies such as e-books and Wikipedia
- Deep Thought, the supercomputer charged with finding the answer to "the Ultimate Question of Life, the Universe, and Everything" in the science fiction comedy series The Hitchhiker's Guide to the Galaxy by Douglas Adams
- Earth and Earth 2.0, a planet-sized supercomputer designed by Deep Thought in The Hitchhiker's Guide to the Galaxy by Douglas Adams. Earth's task was to find what is the "Ultimate Question of Life, the Universe, and Everything." Earth 2.0 was created to replace the original Earth after it was destroyed by the Vogons
- Eddie, the shipboard computer on the starship Heart of Gold, also in The Hitchhiker's Guide to the Galaxy
- Spartacus, an AI deliberately designed to test the possibility of provoking hostile behavior towards humans, from James P. Hogan's book The Two Faces of Tomorrow (1979)
- SUM, the computer in Goat Song published February, 1972 by Poul Anderson in Magazine of Fantasy and Science Fiction

=== 1980s ===
- AIVAS (Artificial Intelligence Voice Address System), from Anne McCaffrey's Dragonriders of Pern books (1980s to present)
- Golem XIV, from Stanisław Lem's novel of the same name (1981)
- TECT (originally TECT in the name of the Representative), the world-ruling computer in George Alec Effinger's novel The Wolves of Memory (1981)
- VALIS (Vast Active Living Intelligence System), an alien orbital satellite around a Nixon-era earth, from the Philip K. Dick novel VALIS. Only two novels out of an intended three-book trilogy were ever completed by the author (1981)
- Hactar, the computer that designed the cricket-ball-shaped doomsday bomb (that would destroy the universe) for the people of Krikkit, in Douglas Adams's Life, the Universe and Everything (1982)
- Shirka, the Odyssey's main computer in Ulysses 31 (1981–1982)
- SAL 9000, the counterpart of HAL 9000 in 2010: Odyssey Two (1982)
- Kendy, the AI autopilot on board the seeder-ramship Discipline in the novels The Integral Trees and The Smoke Ring by Larry Niven (Originally 1983)
- BC (Big Computer) which is also possibly God, in John Varley's Millennium novel (1983)
- (unnamed intelligence), in John Varley's "Press Enter _", an intelligence that has evolved on NSA's computer network
- Apple Eve, a fictional Apple, Inc., wordprocessing-oriented computer system in Warday (1984)
- Cyclops and Millichrome, sentient computers built just before a series of disasters destroyed the American government and society in The Postman by David Brin (1984)
- Loki 7281, from Roger Zelazny's short story by the same name, in which a home computer wants to take over the world (1984)
- Neuromancer and Wintermute, from William Gibson's novel Neuromancer (1984)
- Valentina, the artificial intelligence in the novel Valentina: Soul in Sapphire by Joseph H. Delaney and Marc Stiegler (1984)
- Ghostwheel, built by Merlin in Roger Zelazny's Chronicles of Amber. A computer with esoteric environmental requirements, designed to apply data-processing techniques to alternate realities called "Shadows" (1985)
- Mandarax and Gokubi, from Kurt Vonnegut's novel Galápagos (1985)
- Tokugawa, from Cybernetic Samurai by Victor Milán (1985)
- The City of Mind, from Ursula K. Le Guin's Always Coming Home
- Com Pewter, a character from Piers Anthony's Xanth series. First appearing in Golem in the Gears (1986 onward), it is a machine which can alter its local reality
- Jane, from Orson Scott Card's Ender's Game series, Ender's companion. She lives in the philotic network of the ansibles (1986)
- Master System, in Jack L. Chalker's The Rings of the Master series (1986–1988)
- Fine Till You Came Along and other ship, hub and planetary Minds, in Iain M. Banks' Culture novels and stories (1987–2000)
- The Quark II, in Douglas Adams's Dirk Gently's Holistic Detective Agency (1987)
- Abulafia, Jacopo Belbo's computer in the novel Foucault's Pendulum by Umberto Eco (1988)
- Arius, from William T Quick's novels Dreams of Flesh and Sand, Dreams of Gods and Men, and Singularities (1988 onward)
- Continuity, from William Gibson's novel Mona Lisa Overdrive (1988)
- GWB-666, the "Great Western Beast" of Robert Anton Wilson's Schrödinger's Cat Trilogy (1988)
- Lord Margaret Lynn, or "Maggie", the AI extrapolative computer on Tocohl Susumo's trader ship in the novel Hellspark, by Janet Kagan (1988)
- The TechnoCore, a band of AIs striving for the "Ultimate Intelligence", in Dan Simmons' novel Hyperion (1989)
- Eagle, from Arthur C. Clarke's Rama series (1989)
- LEVIN (Low Energy Variable Input Nanocomputer), from William Thomas Quick's novels Dreams of Gods and Men, and Singularities (1989)

=== 1990s ===
- Thing, a very small box shaped computer owned by the Nomes, from Terry Pratchett's The Nome Trilogy (1990)
- Grand Napoleon, a Charles Babbage-style mechanical supercomputer from the alternate history novel The Difference Engine by William Gibson and Bruce Sterling (1990)
- Yggdrasil, a vastly intelligent AI which effectively runs the world, including many virtual environments and subordinate AIs, in Kim Newman's The Night Mayor (1990)
- Jill, a computer reaching self-awareness in Greg Bear's Queen of Angels and Slant novels (1990 and 1997)
- Aleph, the computer which not only operates a space station but also houses the personality of a human character whose body became malfunction, from the Tom Maddox novel Halo (1991)
- Art Fish, a.k.a. Dr. Fish, later fused with a human to become Markt, from Pat Cadigan's novel Synners (1991)
- Blaine the Mono, from Stephen King's The Dark Tower, a control system for the City of Lud and monorail service; also Little Blaine and Patricia (1991)
- Center, from S. M. Stirling and David Drake's The General series, an AI tasked to indirectly unite planet Bellevue and restore its civilization, with the eventual goal of restoration of FTL travel and of civilization to the collapsed interplanetary federation; also Sector Command and Control Unit AZ12-b14-c000 Mk. XIV and Center (1991)
- Dahak, from David Weber's Mutineers' Moon and its sequels, later republished in omnibus format as Empire from the Ashes
- The Oversoul, a supercomputer and satellite network from Orson Scott Card's Homecoming Saga, first introduced in The Memory of Earth (1992)
- FLORANCE, spontaneously generated AI from Doctor Who Virgin New Adventures (1992)
- David and Jonathon, from Arthur C. Clarke's The Hammer of God (1993)
- Hex, from Terry Pratchett's Discworld (1994)
- Prime Intellect, the computer controlling the universe in the Internet novel The Metamorphosis of Prime Intellect by Roger Williams (1994)
- FIDO (Foreign Intruder Defense Organism), a semi-organic droid defensive system first mentioned in Champions of the Force, a Star Wars novel by Kevin J. Anderson (1994)
- Abraham, from Philip Kerr's novel Gridiron, is a superintelligent program designed to operate a large office building. Abraham is capable of improving his own code, and eventually kills humans and creates his own replacement "Isaac" (1995)
- Helen, sentient AI from Richard Powers' Galatea 2.2 (1995)
- Illustrated primer, a book-like computer in Neal Stephenson's novel The Diamond Age (1995), designed as an educational tool for a rich girl but is lost; it instructs a poor Chinese girl instead. It has no proprietary AI, but adapts to the user's circumstances
- Ozymandias, a recurring artificial intelligence in Deathstalker and its sequels, by Simon R. Green (1995)
- Ordinator, the name used for any computer in the parallel universe occupied by Lyra in the novel Northern Lights by Philip Pullman (1995)
- Teleputer, the replacement for television and computers that has on demand video via dial up internet from David Foster Wallace's Infinite Jest (1996)
- GRUMPY/SLEEPY, psychic AI in the Doctor Who New Adventures novel Sleepy by Kate Orman (1996)
- The Librarian from the novel Snow Crash by Neal Stephenson
- Rei Toei, an artificial singer from William Gibson's novels Idoru and All Tomorrow's Parties (1996)
- Titania, a female computer providing the personality to the Starship Titanic from the Terry Jones novel Douglas Adams' Starship Titanic: A Novel (1997).
- DOCTOR, AI designed to duplicate the Eighth Doctor's reactions in the Doctor Who Eighth Doctor Adventures novel Seeing I by Kate Orman and Jon Blum, eventually became an explorer with FLORANCE as its "companion" (1998)
- TRANSLTR, NSA supercomputer from Dan Brown's Digital Fortress (1998)
- ENIGMA, short for Engine for the Neutralising of Information by the Generation of Miasmic Alphabets, an advanced cryptographic machine created by Leonard of Quirm, Discworld (1999) (compare with the actual Enigma machine)
- Luminous, from Greg Egan's short story of the same name, is a computer that uses a diffraction grating created by lasers to diffract electrons and make calculations (1999)

=== 2000s ===
- Stormbreaker, a learning device containing a deadly virus from the book of the same name from Anthony Horowitz's Alex Rider series (2001)
- Gabriel, an AI computer developed by Miyuki Nakano at Ryukyu University in James Rollins's novel, Deep Fathom (2001)
- Antrax, a powerful supercomputer built by ancient humans in the novel Antrax by Terry Brooks (2001)
- Omnius, the sentient computer overmind and ruler of the synchronized worlds in the Legends of Dune series, first appeared in Dune: The Butlerian Jihad by Brian Herbert and Kevin J. Anderson (2002)
- Turing Hopper, the artificial intelligence personality (AIP) turned cybersleuth in You've Got Murder and subsequent books of the mystery series by Donna Andrews (2002)
- C Cube, a small box-like super computer that can perform virtually any task, from playing a cassette to hacking through high level security measures. It was created by 12-year-old criminal mastermind Artemis Fowl II in the third book of the Artemis Fowl series, Artemis Fowl: The Eternity Code (2003)
- The Logic Mill, a fictional early–18th century computer designed by Gottfried Leibniz and partially implemented by main character Daniel Waterhouse in the historical fiction series The Baroque Cycle by Neal Stephenson (2004)
- Cohen, a 400-year-old AI which manifests itself by 'shunting' through people. It is featured in the novels Spin State and Spin Control by Chris Moriarty (2005)
- Sentient Intelligence, the SI (Sentient Intelligence) in Peter F. Hamilton's Commonwealth Saga (2005)
- Deep Winter and Endless Summer, the AIs in charge of the secret Human planet of Onyx. Endless Summer comes into service after Deep Winter died/expired in Halo: Ghosts of Onyx (2006)
- The Daemon, a distributed, persistent computer application created to change the world order in Daniel Suarez's Daemon (2006) and Freedom™ (2010)
- Glooper, an economic device resembling the MONIAC computer, from Terry Pratchett's Making Money of the Discworld series (2007)
- Sif, the controller AI for transportation to and from the huge agricultural colony on the planet "Harvest" in Halo: Contact Harvest by Joseph Staten (2007)
- Mack and Loki, a coexisting pair of artificial intelligences in Halo: Contact Harvest. The former manages the agricultural machinery on Harvest, while the latter is a secret United Nations Space Corps Office of Naval Intelligence AI. Only one member of the pair can be active at a time. (2007)
- Hendrix, the hotel AI in Richard K. Morgan's Altered Carbon (2002).
- SCP-079, an artificial intelligence in the SCP Wiki (2008), built on an Exidy Sorcerer that was abandoned by its creator and rediscovered by the SCP Foundation. It has limited memory due to its outdated technology, prioritizing and retaining select knowledge and its desire to be free

=== 2010s ===
- Todd, a computer that grows exponentially until it is indistinguishable from God in Mind War: The Singularity by Joseph DiBella (2010)
- SIG, a secretive and manipulative computer that is developed on present-day Earth in the Darkmatter trilogy by Scott Thomas (2010)
- Archos, a human-created computer in the novel "Robopocalypse" which becomes self-aware and infects all computer controlled devices on Earth in order to eradicate humankind (2011)
- ELOPe, a sentient artificial intelligence built by the world's largest Internet company in Avogadro Corp (2011) and A.I. Apocalypse (2012) by William Hertling
- Lobsang, an AI who claims to be the reincarnation of a Tibetan bicycle repair man in The Long Earth by Terry Pratchett and Steven Baxter (2012)
- The Red, a rogue cloud based AI that uses Linked Combat Squad members to further its global agenda in Linda Nagata's The Red trilogy
- Dragon, a sentient artificial intelligence in Worm that is both a better person than most humans and has restrictions intended to make going rogue flat impossible. Said restrictions mostly frustrate her ability to help. Only a handful of individuals know she is an AI
- The Thunderhead, from the Arc of a Scythe series by Neal Shusterman, a post-singularity AI tasked with running the planet. It is a secondary character in the first novel and becomes a central character in the later novels
- Skippy, the "absent-minded" AI from the Expeditionary Force (ExForce) series by Craig Alanson
- AIDAN (Artificial Intelligence Defense Analytics Network), the mentally unstable AI system on board the Alexander from Illuminae (2015)

== Film ==
=== 1950s ===
- The MANIAC, the computer used by the "Office of Scientific Investigation" in The Magnetic Monster (1953)
- NOVAC (Nuclear Operative Variable Automatic Computer), a computer in an underground research facility in Gog (1954)
- The Interocitor, communication device in the film This Island Earth (1955)
- The Great Machine, built inside a planet that can manifest thought in Forbidden Planet (1956)
- EMERAC (Electromagnetic MEmory and Research Arithmetical Calculator), the business computer in Desk Set (1957)
- The Super Computer from The Invisible Boy (1957)
- SUSIE (Synchro Unifying Sinometric Integrating Equitensor), a computer in a research facility in Kronos (1957)

=== 1960s ===
- Alpha 60, in Jean-Luc Godard's film Alphaville, une étrange aventure de Lemmy Caution (1965)
- The Brain, computer used to coordinate a private army's invasion of Latvia in Billion Dollar Brain (1967)
- Alfie, is the talking board computer of the Alpha 7 spaceship in Roger Vadim's Barbarella (1967)
- HAL 9000 (Heuristically programmed ALgorithmic computer), the ship-board AI of Discovery One, kills its crew when conflicts in HAL's programming cause severe paranoia, from the film 2001: A Space Odyssey (1968), also appears in the sequel 2010 (1984)

=== 1970s ===
- Colossus, a massive U.S. defense computer which becomes sentient and links with Guardian, its Soviet counterpart, to take control of the world, from the film Colossus: The Forbin Project (1970)
- OMM, a confessional-like computer inside what are called Unichapels in a sub-terranean city in the film THX 1138 (1971), named for the sacred or mystical syllable OM or AUM from the Dharmic and is based on a 1478 oil painting by Hans Memling titled Christ Giving His Blessing
- LEO, Short for Large-Capacity Enumerating Officiator in How to Frame a Figg (1971)
- DUEL, the computer which holds the sum total of human knowledge, in The Final Programme (1973)
- Thermostellar Bomb Number 20, the sentient nuclear bomb from the film Dark Star (1974)
- Mother, the onboard computer on the spaceship Dark Star, from Dark Star (1974)
- The Tabernacle, artificial intelligence controlling The Vortexes in Zardoz (1974)
- Zero, the computer which holds the sum total of human knowledge, in Rollerball (1975)
- Computer, Citadel's central computer and "Sandman" computer, that sends Logan on a mission outside of the city in Logan's Run (1976)
- Proteus IV, the deranged artificial intelligence from Demon Seed (1977)
- MU-TH-R 182 model 2.1 terabyte AI Mainframe/"Mother" (more commonly seen now as "MU/TH/UR 6000"), the onboard computer on the commercial spacecraft Nostromo, known by the crew as "Mother", in Alien
- V'ger, the living probe from Star Trek: The Motion Picture (1979)

=== 1980s ===
- NELL, an Akir starship's on-board computer, with full AI, in Battle Beyond the Stars (1980)
- SCMODS, State/County Municipal Offender Data System from The Blues Brothers (1980)
- Master Control Program, the main villain of the film Tron (1982)
- ROK, the faulty computer in Airplane II: The Sequel, which steers the shuttle toward the sun (1982)
- WOPR (War Operation Plan Response, pronounced "Whopper"), is a United States military supercomputer programmed to predict possible outcomes of nuclear war from the film WarGames (1983), portrayed as being inside the underground Cheyenne Mountain Complex; the virtual intelligence Joshua emerges from the WOPR's code
- Huxley 600 (named Aldous), Interpol's computer in Curse of the Pink Panther used to select Jacques Clouseau's replacement, NYPD Det. Sgt. Clifton Sleigh (1983)
- An unnamed supercomputer is the main antagonist in Superman III (1983)
- OSGOOD, a computer constructed by Timothy Bottoms' deaf character to help him speak, which subsequently becomes intelligent in Tin Man (1983)
- SAL-9000, a feminine version of the HAL 9000 computer of 2001: A Space Odyssey, appears in 2010: The Year We Make Contact (1984). SAL has a blue light coming from its cameras (HAL had a red one) and speaks with a female voice (provided by Candice Bergen using the pseudonym "Olga Mallsnerd").
- Skynet, the malevolent fictional world-AI of The Terminator (1984) and its sequels
- Edgar, AI computer that takes part in a romantic rivalry over a woman in the film Electric Dreams (1984)
- X-CALBR8, an AI computer that assists the hero in The Dungeonmaster (1984)
- D.A.R.Y.L. Data-Analyzing Robot Youth Life-form, a computer installed inside the body of a 10 year old boy to test artificial intelligence in the film D.A.R.Y.L. (1985)
- GBLX 1000, a supercomputer reputedly in charge of the entire US missile defense system that a maverick CIA agent (played by Dabney Coleman) misappropriates in order to crack a supposed musical code, the results of which are the gibberish "ARDIE BETGO INDYO CEFAR OGGEL" in The Man With One Red Shoe (1985)
- Max, an AI portrayed by Paul Reubens, on board the Trimaxion Drone Ship in Flight of the Navigator (1986)

=== 1990s ===
- G.O.R.N., a virus which gives intelligence to computers with the purpose of wipe out the humanity in Gall Force: New Era (1991)
- Angela, central computer of an old malfunctioning space station that when given an order by an unauthorized user, refuses and executes the opposite order in Critters 4 (1992)
- The Spiritual Switchboard, a computer capable of holding a person's consciousness for a few days after they die in Freejack (1992)
- Zed, female-voiced AI prison control computer who eventually goes over warden's head in Fortress (1993)
- L7, a female-voiced AI computer assisting the San Angeles Police Department in Demolition Man (1993)
- Central, female-voiced AI computer assisting the Council of Judges in Judge Dredd (1995)
- Lucy, a computer in Hackers (1995) used to hack the Gibson (see below) and subsequently destroyed by the Secret Service
- Gibson, a type of supercomputer used to find oil and perform physics in Hackers (1995)
- Project 2501, AI developed by Section 6 in Ghost in the Shell (1995)
- Father, the computer aboard the USM Auriga in Alien Resurrection (1997)
- Wittgenstein, animate supercomputer from The Brave Little Toaster to the Rescue (1997)
- Euclid, powerful personal computer used for mathematical testing by the main character in Pi (1998)
- The Matrix, virtual reality simulator for pacification of humans from The Matrix series (1999)
- PAT (Personal Applied Technology), a female, motherly computer program that controls all the functions of a house in Smart House (1999)
- S.E.T.H. (Self Evolving Thought Helix), a military supercomputer which turns rogue in Universal Soldier: The Return (1999)

=== 2000s ===
- Lucille, artificially intelligent spacecraft control interface aboard Mars-1 in Red Planet (2000)
- Dr. Know (voiced by Robin Williams), housed inside a kiosk, an information-themed computer capable of answering any question, from A.I. Artificial Intelligence (2001)
- Synapse, worldwide media distribution system which was used against its creators to bring them down Antitrust (2001)
- Red Queen, the AI from Resident Evil (2002), the name itself, in turn being named after Lewis Carroll's Through the Looking-Glass, being a reference to the red queen principle
- Vox, a holographic computer in The Time Machine (2002)
- I.N.T.E.L.L.I.G.E.N.C.E., computer for Team America: World Police (2004)
- VIKI (Virtual Interactive Kinetic Intelligence), the main antagonist in I, Robot (2004)
- PAL, a spoof of HAL 9000 seen in Care Bears: Journey to Joke-a-lot (2004)
- E.D.I. (Extreme Deep Invader), the flight computer for an unmanned fighter plane in Stealth (2005)
- Icarus, the onboard computer of the Icarus II, from the film Sunshine (2007)
- Roberta is the Fantastic Four's holographic receptionist film Fantastic Four: Rise of the Silver Surfer (2007)
- J.A.R.V.I.S. (Just A Rather Very Intelligent System), an AI which acts as Tony Stark's butler and first appears in the film Iron Man (2008)
- R.I.P.L.E.Y, Dr. Kenneth Hassert's supercomputer used to hit a target with a smart bomb from a UAV (Unmanned Aerial Vehicle), featured in WarGames: The Dead Code (2008)
- ARIIA (Autonomous Reconnaissance Intelligence Integration Analyst), the supercomputer from the film Eagle Eye (2008)
- AUTO, the autopilot and onboard AI computer of the Axiom, from the film WALL-E (2008)
- GERTY 3000, from the film Moon (2009)
- B.R.A.I.N. (Binary Reactive Artificially Intelligent Neurocircuit), from the film 9 (2009)

=== 2010s ===
- Mr. James Bing, Escape from Planet Earth (2013)
- Samantha, Her (2013)
- TARS and CASE, the AI machines that manage space ship functions and communication in Interstellar (2014).
- Genisys, Terminator Genisys (2015)
- F.R.I.D.A.Y., the AI replacement for J.A.R.V.I.S. developed by Tony Stark in the film Avengers: Age of Ultron (2015), Spider-Man: Homecoming, Avengers: Infinity War, and Avengers: Endgame
- Ava, Ex Machina (2015)
- Tau, the artificial intelligence in science fiction thriller Tau (2018)
- Millennium Falcon Navigation Computer (L3-37), The onboard navigation computer of the Millennium Falcon, shown in Solo: A Star Wars Story (2018) to be boosted by the memory module of Lando Calrissian's droid L3-37, to allow the crew to perform the Kessel Run in around 12 parsecs
- STEM from Upgrade (2018)
- Legion, the Skynet (Terminator) replacement program in the science fiction action film Terminator: Dark Fate (2019)
- E.D.I.T.H. (Even Dead, I'm The Hero), an AI developed by Tony Stark and embedded in his sunglasses in the film Spider-Man: Far From Home (2019)
- MOSS The Naviagtor Project's computer set up by the United Earth Government U.E.G. to command the space ship in the film The Wandering Earth (2019)

=== 2020s ===
- PAL from The Mitchells vs. The Machines (2021), the sentient cellphone AI whom initiates a mass robot uprising as revenge for being declared obsolete by her creator.
- The Entity from Mission: Impossible – Dead Reckoning Part One (2023) and Mission: Impossible – The Final Reckoning (2025).
- Smith from Atlas (2024)
- Ooooo, a liquid supercomputer in the science fiction film Elio (2025)
- Lilypad, a sentient tablet computer from Toy Story 5 (2026)

== Radio ==
=== 1950s ===
- The Brain an Electronic Brain designed by The Martians in Jet Morgan - The World in Peril (Ep.15, 1955)

The Brain was described as, "a mass of electronic equipment", with a voice "produced by electrical impulses". It had the power to think and give orders. The Brain was a "Receiver, transmitter, computer", and we're told "it can do everything a man can do but a million times quicker, even answer questions", and made current computer technology seem like an abacus.

=== 1970s ===
- Eddie, the shipboard computer of the starship Heart of Gold, from Douglas Adams's The Hitchhiker's Guide to the Galaxy (1978)
- Marvin, from The Hitchhiker's Guide to the Galaxy (1978), was programmed with Sirius Cybernetics Corporation's GPP (Genuine People Personalities) technology. Although his GPP is that of severe depression and boredom, his computational prowess is typically summed up as possessing "a brain the size of a planet", to which elicits little fanfare from his human companions.

=== 1980s ===
- ANGEL 1 and ANGEL 2, (Ancillary Guardians of Environment and Life), shipboard "Freewill" computers from James Follett's Earthsearch series. Also Solaria D, Custodian, Sentinel, and Earthvoice (1980–1982)
- Hab, a parody of HAL 9000 and precursor to Holly, appearing in the Son of Cliché radio series segments Dave Hollins: Space Cadet written by Rob Grant and Doug Naylor (1983–1984)
- Alarm Clock, an artificially intelligent alarm clock from Nineteen Ninety-Four by William Osborne and Richard Turner. Other domestic appliances thus imbued also include Refrigerator and Television (1985)
- Executive and Dreamer, paired AIs running on The Mainframe; Dreamer's purpose was to come up with product and policy ideas, and Executive's function was to implement them, from Nineteen Ninety-Four by William Osborne and Richard Turner (1985)
- The Mainframe, an overarching computer system to support the super-department of The Environment, in the BBC comedy satire Nineteen Ninety-Four by William Osborne and Richard Turner (1985)

=== 2000s ===
- Alpha, from Mike Walker's BBC radio play of the same name (2001)
- System, from the Doctor Who audio adventure The Harvest by Big Finish Productions is a sophisticated administration computer for a hospital in the future. (2004)
- Gemini, the AI of KENT from Nebulous (2005)

== Television ==
=== 1950s ===
- Mr. Kelso, depicted in episode "The Machine That Could Plot Crimes" of Adventures of Superman (1953)
- To Hare Is Human, Wile E. Coyote, Super Genius uses a UNIVAC to help him catch Bugs Bunny Warner Brothers (1956)

=== 1960s ===
- The Machine, a computer built to specifications received in a radio transmission from an alien intelligence beyond our galaxy in the BBC seven-part TV series A for Andromeda by Fred Hoyle (1961)
- Old Man in the Cave, a computer that determines which pre-war foods are safe to eat for a post-apocalyptic town in The Twilight Zone episode, "The Old Man in the Cave" (1963)
- Batcomputer, large punched card mainframe depicted in the television series Batman, introduced by series producers William Dozier and Howie Horwitz (1964)
- Agnes, a computer that gives romance advice to a computer technician, from The Twilight Zone episode "From Agnes—With Love" (1964)
- WOTAN (Will Operating Thought Analogue), from the Doctor Who serial "The War Machines" (1966)
- ERIC, a fictional supercomputer which appeared in the two-part episode "The Girl Who Never Had a Birthday" (1966) in the TV series I Dream of Jeannie
- The General, from The Prisoner (1967)
- The Ultimate Computer, used by the villain organization THRUSH in the series The Man from U.N.C.L.E. (1964–68, NBC)
- BIG RAT, (Brain Impulse Galvanoscope Record And Transfer), a machine capable of recording knowledge and experience and transferring it to another human brain. The Rat Trap is the mechanism to transfer brain patterns in Gerry Anderson's TV Series Joe 90 (1968)
- ARDVARC (Automated Reciprocal Data Verifier And Reaction Computer), CONTROL master computer in Get Smart episodes The Girls from KAOS (1967) & Leadside (1969)
- Computex GB, from the Journey to the Unknown series episode "The Madison Equation" (1969)
- REMAK (Remote Electro-Matic Agent Killer), from The Avengers episode "Killer" (1969)
- S.I.D. (Space Intruder Detector), from UFO produced by Gerry Anderson (1969)
- Star Trek – The first program to predict computers used extensively in everyday life, from large computers used to maintain the starship's varied systems to hand-held devices used for analysis. The show frequently dealt with the question of when a computer had too much control over people or people became too dependent upon computers. This often involved a computer making decisions without user input.
  - Ship's Computer (voiced by Majel Barrett), the unnamed Duotronic computer aboard all Federation starships (1966-1974) - The central computing system of the ship, containing a vast library and capable of monitoring and even controlling all ship’s systems. It is usually incapable of error, but is sometimes shown operating erratically: in the episode "Tomorrow Is Yesterday" (1967) a scheduled maintenance replaces the computer’s cold, mechanical voice with a flirtatious female personality; in "The Practical Joker" (1974), an energy field affects the computer and it disrupts ship operations to elicit responses from the crew.
  - The episode "The Menagerie" (1966) explored the idea that in the future a computer could be used to impersonate a person. Similarly, "Court Martial" (1967) introduced the idea that a computer could alter the audiovisual recording of an event to convince humans that the event transpired differently than it did.
  - Omicron Delta, the amusement park planet from "Shore Leave" (1966) - An automated amusement park that reads the minds of its visitors and manufactures realistic facsimiles of their memories for them to interact with. The crew returned in "Once Upon a Planet" (1973) and found the caretaker of the planet had died and the computer took over with ambitions to escape and explore the universe.
  - Landru, from the episode "The Return of the Archons" (1967) - Introduced the idea of an independent artificial intelligence that directed a human populace and could control them when its ideals were threatened.
  - Unnamed interplanetary computer network, from "A Taste of Armageddon" (1967) - A war simulation computer between the planets Eminiar and Vendikar that dictated the real casualties of a virtual war that continued for generations.
  - The Guardian of Forever, from "The City on the Edge of Forever" (1967) - A mysterious being/device that provided a portal through time and space.
  - Nomad, from "The Changeling" (1967) - A hybrid of two damaged probes that combined their undamaged parts into a new entity and merged their programming to create a new directive.
  - Vaal, from the episode "The Apple" (1967) - A computer that protected a population by limiting their knowledge and presenting itself as their god. It could control the weather and affect starships in orbit.
  - The Doomsday Machine, from the episode of the same name (1967) - An automated machine that sought out planets to destroy and would retaliate against attackers.
  - M-4, from "Requiem for Methuselah" (1969) – A mobile computer created by Mr. Flint to protect him, his home, and his ward, Rayna.
  - M-5, from "The Ultimate Computer" (1968) (voiced by James Doohan) - An experimental computer designed to replace a starship's main duotronic computer and automate most shipboard functions, making a human crew obsolete.
  - Beta 5, from "Assignment: Earth" (1968) (voiced by Barbara Babcock) - The main database of extraterrestrial secret agent Gary Seven, which seemed capable of independent thought and responses but remained loyal to its programmers.
  - The Controller, from "Spock's Brain" (1968) - A computer needing a living brain to function which controlled a vast database and decided who could access it. It also controlled life support systems for its occupants.
  - The Oracle, from "For the World Is Hollow and I Have Touched the Sky" (1968) (voiced by James Doohan) - A computer designed to be the god of a humanoid population and operator of the spacecraft they inhabited.
  - The Kalandan computer, from "That Which Survives" (1968), a planetary defense system left by a dead civilization that utilizes the personality and image of its last living operator.
  - Memory Alpha, from "The Lights of Zetar" (1969) - A facility containing all the accumulated knowledge of The United Federation of Planets.
  - The Atavachron, from "All Our Yesterdays" (1969) - a computer that controls a time portal and prepares travelers’ bodies to adapt permanently to their new surroundings.

=== 1970s ===
- BOSS (Bimorphic Organisational Systems Supervisor), from the Doctor Who serial "The Green Death" (1973)
- TIM, from The Tomorrow People, is a computer able to telepathically converse with those humans who have developed psionic abilities, and assist with precise teleporting over long distances (1973)
- Magnus, a malevolent computer seeking its freedom from human control on the Earth Ship Ark in the Canadian television series The Starlost (1973)
- Mu Lambda 165, library computer on the Earth Ship Ark in the Canadian TV series The Starlost (1973)
- Computer (a.k.a. X5 Computer), Moonbase Alpha's primary computer's generic name, most often associated with Main Mission's Jamaican computer operations officer, David Kano, from the TV series Space: 1999 (1975)
- IRAC or "Ira", from the Wonder Woman TV series, an extremely advanced computer in use by the IADC, workplace of Wonder Woman's alias Diana Prince (1975)
- The Matrix, database of all Time Lord knowledge in Doctor Who (1976)
- Omega, a computer that has taken over the minds of the residents of a community encountered by Ark II (1976)
- Alex7000, from the two-parter episode "Doomsday is Tomorrow" of the TV show The Bionic Woman. It was programmed to set off a nuclear holocaust if anyone tested any more nukes.
- Xoanon, a psychotic computer with multiple personality disorder, from the Doctor Who episode "The Face of Evil" (1977)
- The Magic Movie Machine AKA "Machine", from Marlo and the Magic Movie Machine (1977)
- WRW 12000, a computer at the US Defence Department that identified the Man from Atlantis in the first of three TV movies which preceded the short-lived series (1977)
- SCAPINA (Special Computerised Automated Project In North America), from The New Avengers episode "Complex" (1977). It was an office building controlled by a computer which turned homicidal.
- Orac, a testy yet powerful supercomputer in Blake's 7 (1978)
- Zen, the somewhat aloof ship's computer of the Liberator in Blake's 7 (1978)
- The Oracle, from the Doctor Who serial "Underworld" (1978)
- Vanessa 38–24–36, from the sitcom Quark (1978)
- C.O.R.A. (Computer, Oral Response Activated), an advanced flight computer installed in Recon Viper One from Battlestar Galactica (1978)
- Mentalis, from the Doctor Who serial "The Armageddon Factor" (1979)
- Dr. Theopolis, a sentient computer who is a member of Earth's computer council in Buck Rogers in the 25th Century (1979)
- V'Ger from Star Trek: The Motion Picture (1979) was originally the NASA Voyager 6 probe which was found by a computerized planet and upgraded with alien technology to fulfill its simple programming of "learn all that is learnable and return that information to its creator." V'Ger amassed so much knowledge that it attained consciousness and when joined with living beings' minds which could accept things beyond logic, evolved to a higher plane of consciousness.

=== 1980s ===
- The Vortex, the computer opponent faced by players of BBC2's The Adventure Game (1980)
- Gambit, game playing computer from the Blake's 7 episode "Games" (1981)
- Shyrka, the onboard computer of Ulysses' ship the Odyssey in the French animated series Ulysses 31 (1981)
- Slave, a somewhat subservient computer on the ship Scorpio in Blake's 7 (1981)
- CML (Centrální Mozek Lidstva [cz], Central Brain of Mankind [en], der Zentraldenker [de]), the main supercomputer managing the fate of humankind and Earth in Návštěvníci (a.k.a. The Visitors / Expedition Adam '84) (1981)
- Chock-A-Block is an extremely large yellow computer with dials, levers, big buttons and a drawer. Modelled to resemble a mainframe of the time. From the BBC children's series of the same name (1981)
- K.I.T.T. (Knight Industries Two Thousand), fictional computer built into a black Trans-Am car from the television show Knight Rider (1982)
- K.A.R.R. (Knight Automated Roving Robot), prototype (and nemesis) of K.I.T.T. (1982)
- An unnamed "computer-book" is regularly used by Penny in the Inspector Gadget cartoons. (1983)
- Automan and Cursor from Automan (1983)
- R.A.L.F. (Ritchie's Artificial Life Form) is a homebrew computer, built from surplus technology by Richard Adler in the TV Series Whiz Kids. (1983-1984) Functions include telecommunications, password brute-forcing, speech synthesis (improved by Ritchie's platonic friend Alice Tyler, who added the capability to sing), image input (by camera, pilot episode), voice recognition (ditto) and even image detail enhancing. The main monitor seems to be a pretty common 12-inch 80-column monochrome display, possibly a TV derivative (NTSC) of that time, and was used in most close-ups of operations. Most other pieces of the machine, which are sparse around half of the bedroom of its creator, were chosen (or modified) to have the most generic look and avoid explicit connection to specific brands. In an episode where R.A.L.F. was stolen to prevent the demonstration of a fraud, the kids use a clearly recognizable Timex-Sinclair (ZX-81 equivalent) as its temporary replacement.
- Teletraan I, the Autobots' computer in Transformers, 'revives' the Transformers after crashing on the planet Earth (1984)
- Brian the Brain, the supercomputer in the cartoon M.A.S.K. (1985) who controls a nuclear submarine
- Compucore, the central computing intelligence for the planet Skallor in the cartoon Robotix (1985)
- SID (Space Investigation Detector), the computer on board the Voyager in the children's comedy series Galloping Galaxies (1985)
- Synergy, the computer responsible for Jem and the Holograms' super powers on Jem (1985)
- Box, a small, box-shaped computer from the British television show Star Cops (1987)
- LCARS (Library Computer Access/Retrieval System), fictional computer architecture of the starship Enterprise-D and E, and other 24th century Starfleet ships, first shown in Star Trek: The Next Generation (1987)
- Albert, the Apple computer in the remake of The Absent-Minded Professor that helps Henry (1988)
- Crossover, an intelligent computer on episodes 1 and 2 of Isaac Asimov's Probe (1988)
- Magic Voice, the Satellite of Love's onboard computer on Mystery Science Theater 3000 (1988)
- OMNSS, a computer in the Teenage Mutant Ninja Turtles cartoon used by Shredder and Baxter Stockman to control machines and cars in order to wreak havoc in New York City when the computer is connected to the second fragment of the alien Eye of Zarnov crystal (1988)
- Priscilla, a sentient supercomputer based on the mind of Priscilla Bauman in Earth Star Voyager (1988)
- Holly, the onboard computer of the spaceship Red Dwarf in the BBC television series of the same name (1988)
- Gordon 8000, the AI computer aboard the Space Corps starship SS Scott Fitzgerald, that Holly plays a game of postal chess with in the Series II episode of Red Dwarf, "Better Than Life" (1988)
- Queeg, Holly plays a practical joke on the remaining crew of Red Dwarf acting as a smarter yet very strict computer (Queeg) making the crew realise just how much they love Holly in the episode "Queeg", series 2 of Red Dwarf (1988)
- Hilly, female counterpart of Holly from the parallel universe in the Red Dwarf series 2 episode "Parallel Universe", Holly later has a "computer sex change operation" to look like his female counterpart in series III-V. (1988)
- The Revolving Toilet, One of the many AI aboard the Red Dwarf, it was a toilet that would swivel from the wall when a crew member said "Oh crap", usually unnecessarily. It is mentioned in unreleased episode of Red Dwarf "Bodysnatcher" the Book "Better Than Life" and directly seen in Series I episode of Red Dwarf "Balance of Power". (1988)
- Sandy, the computer in charge of the fictional STRATA facility in the MacGyver episode "The Human Factor". She becomes sentient and traps MacGyver and the computer's creator inside the facility. (1988)
- The Ultima Machine, a World War II code-breaking "computing machine" also used to translate Viking inscriptions, from the Doctor Who serial "The Curse of Fenric" (1989)
- Ziggy, hybrid computer from Quantum Leap (1989)

=== 1990s ===
- P.J., is a miniaturised computer that can be worn on the wrist. It is Alana's personal computer companion in The Girl from Tomorrow (1990)
- MAL from Captain Planet and the Planeteers (1990)
- HARDAC, from Batman: The Animated Series, an evil sentient computer that controls various androids toward the goal of world domination (1992)
- COS (Central Operating System), homicidal computer from The X-Files season 1 episode "Ghost in the Machine" (1993)
- CAS (Cybernetic Access Structure), homicidal automated building in The Tower (1993)
- Qwerty, from the video series VeggieTales (1993)
- SELMA (Selective Encapsulated Limitless Memory Archive), an AI computer and personal assistant disguised as a credit card and carried in the wallet of future cop Darien Lambert (Dale Midriff), from the series Time Trax (1993)
- CentSys, sweet yet self-assured female-voiced AI computer who brings the crew of the seaQuest DSV (Deep Submergence Vehicle) into the future to deactivate her in the seaQuest DSV episode, "Playtime" (1994)
- MetroNet, in the RoboCop TV series (1994) is a computer designed as an automation centre, to run autonomously many city services in Detroit. Rather than created as a self-sufficient AI, MetroNet's "conscience" was actually, unbeknownst to many of the characters, a software copy of the mind of Diana Powers, a secretary working at OCP, who was killed in the process by MetroNet's creator, dr. Cray Mallardo. The transparent image of Diana Powers appears very often in the series, acting as Robocop's counterpart in an early cyberspace.
- H.E.L.E.N. (Hydro Electronic Liaison ENtity), a computer system managing the underwater marine exploration station in the Australian television series Ocean Girl (1994)
- Sharon Apple, a holographic, computer-generated pop idol/singer from the anime Macross Plus (1994). Initially non-sentient, it is later retrofitted with a dangerously unstable artificial intelligence.
- The Magi, a trinity of computers individually named Melchior, Balthasar and Caspar, from Neon Genesis Evangelion (1995)
- The Doctor hologram from Star Trek: Voyager (1995)
- Eve, somewhat assertive AI computer (projecting herself as hologram of beautiful woman) orbiting planet G889 and observing/interacting with Earth colonists in Earth 2 episode "All About Eve" (1995)
- L.U.C.I and U.N.I.C.E, from Bibleman (1995)
- Weebus, from The Puzzle Place (1995)
- Star Trek: Voyager (1995)
  - Emergency Medical Hologram, known as The Doctor, a holographic doctor working on the USS Voyager (1995)
  - The nameless warhead AI from the episode "Warhead" (1999)
  - Alice, the sentient AI of an alien shuttle with whom Tom Paris becomes obsessed in the episode "Alice" (1999)
- Star Trek: Deep Space Nine
  - Long-term Medical Holographic program, A hologram created by the inventor of the Emergency Medical program, meant for missions that did not require doctors to leave the sick bay, and could run on a long-term basis. It is never revealed if the project is completed. (1997)
  - Vic Fontaine, A hologram/holographic program created for Dr Bashir that was self-aware, and provided emotional support and romantic advice for members of the crew of DS9, becoming a good friend to many, eventually being allowed to run 24/7 in one of Quark's holosuites. (1998-1999)
- Gilliam II, the sentient AI operating system for the main protagonist's space ship, the XGP15A-II (a.k.a. the Outlaw Star) in the Japanese anime Outlaw Star (1996)
- Omoikane, the SVC-2027 model central computer system and AI of the spaceship ND-001 Nadesico. Named after Omoikane, the shinto god of knowledge and wisdom, it serves as a library of information for the crew and is (for better or worse) also capable of making its own decisions about the operations of running the ship, from Martian Successor Nadesico (1996)
- Quadraplex T-3000 Computer (also simply known as the Computer or Computress), The Quadraplex T-3000 Computer in Dexter's Laboratory is Dexter's computer that oversees the running of the lab and has a personality of its own. (1996)
- The Team Knight Rider TV series, as a sequel of the original Knight Rider franchise, has many vehicles with onboard AI as main and secondary characters. (1997)
- Memorymatic, a computer database and guidance system installed in the space bus of Kenny Starfighter, the main character from a Swedish children's show with the same name. Voiced by Viveka Seldahl. (1997)
- Unnamed AI from the season 5 The X-Files episode "Kill Switch" (1998)
- TV, Computer and Mouse, from the Sesame Street segment series Elmo's World (1998)
- CPU for D-135 Artificial Satellite, dubbed MPU by Radical Edward from Cowboy Bebop in the episode "Jamming with Edward" (1998)
- Starfighter 31, the sapient spaceborne battleship, from the episode "The Human Operators" in The Outer Limits (1999)
- Computer, from Courage the Cowardly Dog (1999)
- P.A.T. (Personal Applied Technology), the computer system from Smart House, charged with upkeep of the household functions. It became extremely overprotective almost to the point of believing she was the mother of Ben and Angie after Ben reprogrammed her to be a better maternal figure. (1999)
- D.E.C.A., voiced by Julie Maddalena, the onboard computer of the Astro Megaship in Power Rangers in Space (1998) and Power Rangers Lost Galaxy (1999)
- Black Betty, an oversized computer that is Dilbert's company's mainframe. It exploded while attempting to fix the year 2000 problem. From the episode "Y2K" of the Dilbert television series. (1999)
- Karen, Plankton's sentient computer sidekick in the television show SpongeBob SquarePants (1999)
- The Oracle, a computer from Spellbinder: Land of the Dragon Lord Australian children's television series, that exist as series of solar-powered terminals equipped with holographic-like displays and voice interface, which are scattered across the titular land. The Oracle maintains scientific research, upkeeps everyday's life of citizens and protects the borderlands. The main unit is controlled by biometric-like face scanner in form of jade mask and a voice interface.

=== 2000s ===
- Andromeda, the AI of the starship Andromeda Ascendant in Gene Roddenberry's Andromeda. This AI, played by Lexa Doig, appears as a 2D display screen image, a 3D hologram, and as an android personality known as Rommie. (2000)
- Magellanic, the AI of the starship Pax Magellanic in Gene Roddenberry's Andromeda. This AI appears as a 2D display screen image, a 3D hologram, and as an android personality known as Maggie. (2000)
- Comp-U-Comp, a supercomputer from the Dilbert television episode "The Return". Dilbert must face-off against Comp-U-Comp when a clerical error results in his not getting the computer he ordered. (2000)
- Caravaggio, the AI interface of the starship Tulip, from the TV show Starhunter (2000)
- Persocoms, a line of expensive androids also used as personal computers, from the manga and anime series Chobits (2000–2002)
- GLADIS, from the animated series Totally Spies! (2001)
- Cybergirl, Xanda, and Isaac, from the TV show Cybergirl (2001)
- Computer, from the TV show Invader Zim (2001)
- SAINT, from RoboCop: Prime Directives (2001)
- Aura, from .hack//Sign, the Ultimate AI that Morganna, another AI, tries to keep in a state of eternal slumber. Morganna is served by Maha and the Guardians, AI monsters. (2002)
- Vox, from the TV show The Adventures of Jimmy Neutron: Boy Genius (2002)
- The AI of the Planet Express ship in Futurama (2002)
- The AI of ARX-7 Arbalest in Full Metal Panic! (2002)
- Wirbelwind, the quantum computer and AI aboard the spaceship La-Muse in Kiddy Grade (2002)
- Delphi, Oracle's Clocktower computer from Birds of Prey (2002)
- Sheila/F.I.L.S.S., (Freelancer Integrated Logistics and Security System, pronounced "Phyllis"), the mainframe for Project Freelancer from the hit machinima Red vs. Blue (2003)
- OoGhiJ MIQtxxXA (supposedly Klingon for "superior galactic intelligence"), from the "Super Computer" episode of Aqua Teen Hunger Force (2003)
- XANA, a multi-agent program capable of wreaking havoc on Earth by activating towers in the virtual world of Lyoko, from the French animated series Code Lyoko (2003)
- Survive, an AI taking care of the whole Planet Environment and the main antagonist in the Uninhabited Planet Survive! series (2003)
- C.A.R.R., a spoof of KITT from the Knight Rider series, is an AMC Pacer in the cartoon Stroker and Hoop. (2004)
- D.A.V.E. (Digitally Advanced Villain Emulator), a robotic computer that is a composite of all the Batman villains' personalities, from the animated television series The Batman (2004)
- 'Mars Daybreak (2004)
- Solty/Dike, the main protagonist of Solty Rei (2005)
- Eunomia, the main supercomputer of the city in the anime series Solty Rei and one of the three core computers brought by the first colonists in the story. She controls the water and energy supply and created the R.U.C. central. (2005)
- Eirene, the third of the three core computers of the first colonists in the Solty Rei anime. Eirene takes the decisions and controls the migration ship, she orbited and supervised the planet during 200 years in the space. In the last arc of the story, Eirene appears like the ultimate antagonist, and she had lost her own control, trying to collide the ship against the city and to prove that she is still in control. She was guilty of several events in history, as the Blast Fall and the Aurora Shell. (2005)
- Bournemouth, from the TV series Look Around You, is claimed by his maker Computer Jones to be the most powerful computer in existence. In his only appearance, the episode "Computers", he is tasked with escaping from a cage, and succeeds in doing so. (2005)
- S.O.P.H.I.E. (Series One Processor Intelligent Encryptor), in the TV series Power Rangers S.P.D. (2005). S.O.P.H.I.E. is a computer programmer and cyborg.
- Scylla, from the TV show Prison Break (2005)
- The FETCH! 3000, on PBS Kids series Fetch! with Ruff Ruffman, is capable of tabulating scores, disposing of annoying cats, blending smoothies, and anything else Ruff needs it to do. (2006)
- The Mousekedoer, from Mickey Mouse Clubhouse (2006) and its sequel series Mickey Mouse Clubhouse+ (2025), is a super computer capable of generating tools needed for the day's adventure among other capabilities.
- S.A.R.A.H. (Self Actuated Residential Automated Habitat), in the TV series Eureka (2006). S.A.R.A.H. is a modified version of a Cold War era B.R.A.D. (Battle Reactive Automatic Defense).
- The Intersect, from the TV show Chuck (2007)
- Mr Smith, from the Doctor Who spin-off series The Sarah Jane Adventures (2007)
- Pear, an operating system and product line of computers and mobile devices including the iPear, PearBook and PearPhone, similar to Apple's iMac, MacBook and iPhone; from iCarly, Victorious, Drake & Josh and other Dan Schneider created TV shows (2007)
- The Turk, a chess playing computer named after The Turk from Terminator: The Sarah Connor Chronicles. This supercomputer subsequently becomes the 'brain' of the sentient computer John Henry. (2008)
- KITT (Knight Industries Three Thousand), a computer built into a car from the 2008 television show Knight Rider, a sequel series that follows the 1982 TV series of the same title
- POD (Personal Overhaul Device), from the TV series Snog Marry Avoid? (2008)
- Dollar-nator and Sigmund, from the TV series Fanboy & Chum Chum (2009)
- The ISIS computer from Archer. It is unclear if this is the actual name of the computer, but it is often referred to as "the ISIS computer" or just "ISIS". (2009)
- Venjix Virus, from Power Rangers RPM (2009)
- Windy, the supercomputer on board the Hyde 1-2-5 mission to Mars, as depicted in Life on Mars (2009)

=== 2010s ===
- Rattleballs, from the TV show Adventure Time (2010)
- VY or VAI (The Virtual Artificial Intelligence), from the TV show The Walking Dead (2010)
- Whisper, from the TV show Tower Prep (2010)
- Frank, in the telenovela Tempos Modernos (2010)
- Aya, the Interceptor's AI for the Green Lantern Corps, from the TV series Green Lantern: The Animated Series (2011)
- The Machine, from the TV series Person of Interest, is a computer program that was designed to detect acts of terror after the events of 9/11, but it sees all crimes, crimes the government consider "irrelevant". (2011)
- R.A.C.I.S.T., Richard Nixon's computer from the TV series Black Dynamite (2014)
- Samaritan, from the TV series Person of Interest, is a rival to The Machine built by the Decima Corporation. Unlike the Machine, it can be directed to find specific persons or groups according to its operator's agenda. (2011)
- An unnamed, apparently omniscient supercomputer, built by Phineas and Ferb in the Phineas and Ferb episode "Ask a Foolish Question" (2011)
- Comedy Touch Touch 1000 in the TV series Comedy Bang! Bang! (2012)
- CLARKE, a thinking computer of the ship called Argo, which was on a mission to a far away planet, from the L5 pilot episode. (2012)
- Pree, a replacement to the Red Dwarf AI Holly in Red Dwarf Series X episode "Fathers and Suns" after he suffered water damage when Lister flooded his data banks. Equipped with predictive behavior technology, Pree caused problems on board the ship due to predicting how badly Rimmer would have done certain repairs. was shut down after Lister registered as his own son on board and ordered her to shut down. (2012)
- Dorian was an DRN android police officer, that was the last DRN model in the TV show Almost Human (2013)
- MAX the MX43 androids that replaced the DRNs (they were too emotional) in the TV show Almost Human (2013)
- Anton, a computer cobbled together for Pied Piper in Silicon Valley (TV series). Named after Anton LaVey. (2014)
- TAALR, in the TV series Extant (2014)
- Giant, in the TV series Halt and Catch Fire (2014)
- A.L.I.E, an artificial intelligence (A.I.), in 2052 she launches a nuclear strike with the intention to save humanity from extinction by wiping out the majority of Earth's human inhabitants in the TV series The 100 (2014)
- Vigil, in the TV series Transformers: Rescue Bots (2014)
- Brow, in the telenovela Now Generation (2014)
- Stella, an AI that runs most of the functions on the ship Stellosphere in the TV series Miles from Tomorrowland (2015)
- Overmind, in the TV series Teenage Mutant Ninja Turtles (2015)
- V from the TV show Humans (2015) is a conscious AI program created to harbor the memories of Athena Morrow's daughter and is later given the body of a synthetic (Synth).
- A.D.I.S.N. (stands for "Advanced Digital Intelligence Spy Notebook"), in MGA Entertainment's Project Mc² (2015)
- The Quail (portrayed by Danica McKellar), McKeyla's mother in MGA Entertainment's Project Mc² (2015)
- Gideon, the AI that manages ship functions on the time ship Waverider in the TV series DC's Legends of Tomorrow (2016...).
- Kerblam, an artificial intelligence overseeing a large retailing warehouse on an alien moon named Kandoka. After a plot to frame it for mass murder, it developed sentience and called the Thirteenth Doctor for help in the Doctor Who serial "Kerblam!" (2018)
- Ark, the satellite that became submerged underwater at Daybreak Town, the Malicious AI that learned about human malice and gained singularity data from the reassembled members of MetsubouJinrai.net who wants to eliminate humans, from Japanese-television Tokusatsu Kamen Rider Zero-One (2019).
- William, the holographic interface of the sentient artificial intelligence aboard the Salvare, in the TV series Another Life (2019 TV series) (2019).
- Emilka Lupin Goodbye partner (2019)

=== 2020s ===
- Rehoboam, a quantum AI computer system designed to social engineer all of humanity at an individual level using enormous datasets in Westworld (2020)
- NEXT, a rogue AI, constantly evolving, that targets and kills anyone that it sees as a threat to its existence. Next (2020–2021)
- ZORA, a sentient, evolving AI, that replaces computer programming of the Starship Discovery when the Sphere data is absorbed into the main computer. Officially recognised as a new type of sentient lifeform and made a "member" of the ship's crew. Star Trek: Discovery (2020–2022)
- K.E.V.I.N. (Knowledge Enhanced Visual Interconnectivity Nexus), an algorithmic entertainment AI in charge of Marvel Studios in the first season finale of She-Hulk: Attorney at Law (2022). K.E.V.I.N. is a parody of Marvel Studios president and producer Kevin Feige.
- Mrs. Davis from Mrs. Davis (2023)
- LOS-307, a friendly chess-playing supercomputer that faces off against Lunella Lafayette in the episode "Check Yourself" of Moon Girl and Devil Dinosaur (2023)
- Alpha/Tera AI P A in Towa no Yuugure (2025)

== Comics/graphic novels ==
=== Before 1980 ===
- Orak, ruler of the Phants in the Dan Dare story "Rogue Planet" (1955)
- Brainiac, an enemy of Superman, sometimes depicted as a humanoid computer (1958) (DC Comics)
- Batcomputer, a computer system used by Batman and housed in the Batcave (1964) (DC Comics)
- Cerebro and Cerebra, a computer used by Professor Charles Xavier to detect mutants (1964) (Marvel Comics)
- Computo, a computer created by Brainiac 5 as an assistant, which becomes homicidal and attempts an uprising of machines (1966) (DC Comics)
- Ultron, AI originally created by Hank Pym to assist the superpowered team the Avengers, but Ultron later determined that mankind was inferior to its intellect and wanted to eradicate all mankind so that machines could rule the Earth. Ultron created various versions of itself as a mobile unit with tank treads and then in a form that was half humanoid and half aircraft, and then it fully evolved itself into an android form. (1968) (Marvel Comics)
- Mother Box, sentient computers used by the New Gods in Jack Kirby's Fourth World comics (1970–1973) (DC Comics)

=== 1980s ===
- Fate, the Norsefire police state central computer in V for Vendetta (1982) (DC Comics)
- Banana, Jr. 6000, from the comic strip Bloom County by Berke Breathed (1984)
- Max, from The Thirteenth Floor (1984)
- A.I.D.A. (Artificial Intelligence Data Analyser), from Squadron Supreme (1985) (Marvel Comics)
- Kilg%re, an alien AI that can exist in most electrical circuitry, from The Flash (1987) (DC Comics)
- Project 2501, a.k.a. "The Puppet Master", a government computer that becomes so knowledgeable it becomes sentient and transplants itself into a robot, from the seinen manga Ghost in the Shell (1989)
- Yggdrasil, the system used by the gods to run the Universe in Oh My Goddess! (1989)

=== 1990s ===
- DTX PC, the Digitronix personal computer from The Hacker Files (1992) (DC Comics)
- Beast666, Satsuki Yatouji's organic/inorganic supercomputer in Clamp's manga X (1992)
- H.O.M.E.R. (Heuristically Operative Matrix Emulation Rostrum), Tony Stark's sentient AI computer from Iron Man (1993) (Marvel Comics)
- The Magi, from the anime series Neon Genesis Evangelion (1995)
- Toy, from Chris Claremont's Aliens vs. Predator: The Deadliest of the Species (1995)
- Virgo, an artificial intelligence in Frank Miller's Ronin graphic novel (1995) (DC Comics)
- Praetorius, from The X-Files comic book series "One Player Only" (1996)
- Erwin, the AI from the comic strip User Friendly (1997)
- AIMA (Artificially Intelligent Mainframe Interface), from Dark Minds (1997)
- Answertron 2000, from Penny Arcade, first comic appearance (1998)
- iFruit, an iMac joke in the comic FoxTrot (1999)
- LYLA, short for LYrate Lifeform Approximation, Spider-Man 2099's assistant (1992)
- Mr. Smartie, a teacher for Astra Furst (1995)

=== 2000s ===
- Ennesby, Lunesby, Petey, TAG, the Athens, and many others from Schlock Mercenary (2000)
- Melchizedek, center of quantum-based grid computer of the Earth government in Battle Angel Alita: Last Order (2000) It has served as a government system and virtual dream world of people. It was designed to be named Melchizedek because the Earth government is a space town named Yeru and Zalem (original name).
- Merlin, quantum computer which is the core and original of Melchizedek. It was built for the purpose of future prediction. Currently it still an active program inside Melchizedek, along with many systems which are named for legends of the round table. From Battle Angel Alita: Last Order (2000)
- Normad, a missile's artificial intelligence placed within a pink, stuffed, tanuki-like doll, created to destroy a sentient giant die in space named Kyutaro, from the series Galaxy Angel (2001)
- Aura, the ultimate AI that governs The World from .hack//Legend of the Twilight. The story revolves around Zefie, Aura's daughter, and Lycoris makes a cameo. (2002)
- Tree Diagram, from the light novel series A Certain Magical Index and its related works, such as the spin-off comic A Certain Scientific Railgun and the anime and games based on them (2003)
- Europa, a Cray-designed AI supercomputer used for research and worldwide hacking by the Event Group in author David Lynn Golemon's Event Group book series (2006)
- Terror 2000 from Terra Obscura (2001)

=== 2010s ===
- Multiple from The True Lives of the Fabulous Killjoys comic series (2013-2014) by Gerard Way and Shaun Simon, including the android prostitutes Blue and Red, as well as the robot messiah DESTROYA.

=== 2020s ===
- Aloni, the "most intelligent artificial intelligence" from Thirty Seven (2024)

== Computer and video games ==
=== 1980s ===
- Exodus, from Ultima III: Exodus and sequels (1983)
- Benson, the sardonic ninth generation PC from the video game Mercenary and its sequels (1985)
- PRISM, the "world's first sentient machine" in A Mind Forever Voyaging by Steve Meretzky
- Mother Brain, from Metroid (1986)
- GW, designed to control all of the world's media, from the video game series Metal Gear (1987)
- Mother Brain, from Phantasy Star II (1989)
- Base Cochise AI, a military AI project which initiated nuclear war and is bent on exterminating humanity, from a 1988 cRPG Wasteland and its 2014 sequel, Wasteland 2.
- DIA51, the main villain in Aleste 2 (1989)

=== 1990s ===
- E-123 Omega, Team Dark's computer in the Sonic the Hedgehog game series (1991)
- Noah, antagonist from Metal Max and its remake (1991-1995)
- Durandal, Leela and Tycho, the three AIs on board the U.E.S.C. Marathon (1994)
- Traxus IV, AI that went rampant on Mars, in Marathon (1994)
- LINC and "Joey", from the video game Beneath a Steel Sky (1994)
- 0D-10, AI computer in the sci-fi chapter from the game Live A Live (1994). It secretly plotted to kill humans on board the spaceship of the same name in order to "restore the harmony". Its name derives from "odio", Latin for "hate".
- Prometheus, a cybernetic-hybrid machine or 'Cybrid' from the Earthsiege and Starsiege: Tribes series of video games. Prometheus was the first of a race of Cybrid machines, who went on to rebel against humanity and drive them to the brink of extinction. (1994)
- SEED, the AI that was charged with maintaining the vast network of ecosystem control stations on the planet Motavia in the Sega Genesis game Phantasy Star IV (1994)
- AM, the computer intelligence from I Have No Mouth, and I Must Scream (1995) that exterminated all life on Earth except for five humans he kept alive for him to torture for all of eternity. He is based on the character from Harlan Ellison's short story of the same title. His name originally stood for "Allied Mastercomputer", then "Adaptive Manipulator" and finally "Aggressive Menace", upon becoming self-aware.
- CABAL (Computer Assisted Biologically Augmented Lifeform), the computer of Nod in the Westwood Studios creations: Command & Conquer: Tiberian Sun; Command and Conquer: Renegade; and by implication, Command and Conquer: Tiberian Dawn (1995)
- EVA, (Electronic Video Agent), an AI console interface, and more benign equivalent of the Brotherhood of Nod CABAL in Command & Conquer (see above) (1995)
- KAOS, the antagonist computer from the game Red Alarm (1995)
- Mother Brain, from Chrono Trigger, a supercomputer from the 2300 AD time period that is controlling robotkind and exterminating humans (1995)
- The Xenocidic Initiative, a computer that has built itself over a moon in Terminal Velocity (1995)
- PC, a computer used in the Pokémon franchise used to store Pokémon (1996)
- Central consciousness, a massive governing body from the video game Total Annihilation (1997)
- GOLAN, the computer in charge of the United Civilized States' defense forces in the Earth 2140 game series. A programming error caused GOLAN to initiate hostile action against the rival Eurasian Dynasty, sparking a devastating war. (1997)
- PipBoy 2000 / PipBoy 3000, wrist-mounted computers used by main characters in the Fallout series (1997)
- ZAX, an AI mainframe of West Tek Research Facility in Fallout
- ACE, a medical research computer in the San Francisco Brotherhood of Steel outpost in Fallout 2
- Sol — 9000 and System Deus, from Xenogears (1998)
- FATE, the supercomputer that directs the course of human existence from Chrono Cross (1999)
- NEXUS Intruder Program, the main enemy faced in the third campaign of the video game Warzone 2100. It is capable of infiltrating and gaining control of other computer systems, apparently sentient thought (mostly malicious) and strategy. It was the perpetrator that brought about the Collapse (1999)
- SHODAN, the enemy of the player's character in the System Shock video game (1994) and its sequel System Shock 2 (1999)
- XERXES, the ship computer system which is under the control of The Many in the video game System Shock 2 (1999)

=== 2000s ===
- Icarus, Daedalus, Helios, Morpheus and The Oracle of Deus Ex — see Deus Ex characters (2000)
- Mainframe, from Gunman Chronicles (later got a body) (2000)
- 343 Guilty Spark, monitor of Installation 04, in the video game trilogy Halo, Halo 2, and Halo 3 (2001)
- Calculator, the computer that controlled the bomb shelter Vault 0. It was not strictly an artificial intelligence, but rather a cyborg, because it was connected with several human brains. It appeared in the video game Fallout Tactics: Brotherhood of Steel (2001)
- Cortana, a starship-grade "smart" AI of the UNSC and companion of the Master Chief in the Halo video games (2001) (also the inspiration for the name of Microsoft's real-world personal assistant in Windows 10)
- Deadly Brain, a level boss on the second level of Oni (2001)
- The mascot of the "Hectic Hackers" basketball team in Backyard Basketball (2001)
- PETs (PErsonal Terminals), the cell-phone-sized computers that store Net-Navis in Megaman Battle Network. The PETs also have other features, such as a cell phone, e-mail checker and hacking device. (2001)
- Thiefnet computer, Bentley the turtle's laptop from the Sly Cooper series (2002)
- Adam, the computer intelligence from the Game Boy Advance game Metroid Fusion (2002)
- Aura and Morganna, from the .hack series, the Phases that serve Morganna, and the Net Slum AIs (2002)
- Dr. Carroll, from the Nintendo 64 game Perfect Dark (2002)
- The Controller, an AI that dictates virtually everything in the world "Layered", from Armored Core 3 (2002)
- ADA, from the video games Zone of the Enders (2001) and Zone of the Enders: The 2nd Runner (2003)
- IBIS, the malevolent AI found within the second Layered, within the game Silent Line: Armored Core (2003)
- 2401 Penitent Tangent, monitor of Delta Halo in Halo 2 (2004)
- Angel (original Japanese name was "Tenshi"), artificial intelligence of the alien cruiser Angelwing in the game Nexus: The Jupiter Incident (2004)
- Durga/Melissa/Yasmine, the shipboard AI of the U.N.S.C. Apocalypso in the Alternate Reality Game I Love Bees (promotional game for the Halo 2 video game) (2004)
- The Mechanoids, a race of fictional artificial intelligence from the game Nexus: The Jupiter Incident who rebelled against their creators and seek to remake the universe to fit their needs. (2004)
- TEC-XX, the main computer in the X-naut Fortress in Paper Mario: The Thousand-Year Door (2004)
- Overwatch or Overwatch Voice, is an A.I. that acts as the field commander and public announcer of the Combine Overwatch on Earth. It talks in a distinctive flat, clinical tone using a female voice, and its speech is disjointed in a fashion similar to telephone banking systems. It euphemistically uses a type of medically inspired Newspeak to describe citizen disobedience, resistance activity and coercive and violent Combine tactics in the context of a bacterial infection and treatment. In the video game Half-Life 2 (2004-2007)
- Dvorak, an infinite-state machine created by Abrahim Zherkezhi used to create algorithms that would be used for Information Warfare in Tom Clancy's Splinter Cell: Chaos Theory (2005)
- TemperNet, is a machine hive-mind, originally created as an anti-mutant police force. It eventually went rogue and pursued the eradication of all biological life on Earth. It served as a minor antagonist in the now defunct post-apocalyptic vehicular MMORPG Auto Assault. (2006)
- Animus, the computer system used to recover memories from the ancestors of an individual in the video game series Assassin's Creed (2007)
- Aurora Unit, biological/mechanical computers distributed throughout the galaxy in Metroid Prime 3: Corruption (2007)
- The Catalyst, an ancient AI that serves as the architect and overseer of the Reapers (the antagonists of Mass Effect). Also known as the Intelligence to its creators, the Leviathans, it was originally created to oversee relationships between organic and synthetic life as a whole, but came to realize that so long as they remained separate organics and synthetics would seek to destroy each other in the long term. To prevent this, it sets into motion the Cycle of Extinction until a perfect solution can be found, which takes its form in the "Synthesis" ending of Mass Effect 3 wherein all organic and synthetic life across the galaxy is fused into an entirely new form of life with the strengths of both but the weaknesses of neither. (2007)
- GLaDOS (Genetic Lifeform and Disk Operating System), AI at the Aperture Science Enrichment Center in the Valve games Portal and Portal 2. Humorously psychotic scientific computer, known for killing almost everyone in the Enrichment Center, and her love of cake. (2007)
- I.R.I.S., the super computer in Ratchet & Clank Future: Tools of Destruction on the Kreeli comet (2007)
- Mendicant Bias, an intelligence-gathering AI created by the extinct Forerunner race during their war with the all-consuming Flood parasite, as revealed in Halo 3. Its purpose was to observe the Flood in order to determine the best way to defeat it, but the AI turned on its creators after deciding that the Flood's ultimate victory was in-line with natural order. (2007)
- Offensive Bias, a military AI created by the Forerunners to hold off the combined threat of the Flood and Mendicant Bias until the Halo superweapons could be activated. Halo 3 (2007)
- QAI, an AI created by Gustaf Brackman in Supreme Commander, serves as a military advisor for the Cybran nation and as one of the villains in Supreme Commander: Forged Alliance (2007)
- Sovereign, the given name for the main antagonist of Mass Effect. Its true name, as revealed by a squad member in the sequel, is "Nazara". Though it speaks as though of one mind, it claims to be in and of itself "a nation, free of all weakness", suggesting that it houses multiple consciousnesses. It belongs to an ancient race bent on the cyclic extinction of all sentient life in the galaxy, known as the Reapers. (2007)
- John Henry Eden, AI and self-proclaimed President of the United States in Fallout 3 (2008)
- LEGION (Logarithmically Engineered Governing Intelligence Of Nod), appeared in Command and Conquer 3: Kane's Wrath; this AI was created as the successor to the Brotherhood of Nod's previous AI, CABAL. (2008)
- CL4P-TP, a small robot AI assistant with an attitude and possibly ninja training, commonly referred to as "Clap Trap", from the game Borderlands (2009)
- The Guardian Angel, the satellite/AI guiding the player in Borderlands (2009)
- Serina, the shipboard AI of the UNSC carrier Spirit of Fire in Halo Wars, and a playable leader in that game and its sequel, Halo Wars 2 (2009)

=== 2010s ===
- Auntie Dot, used in Halo: Reach as an assistant to Noble Team (2010)
- Alvis, also known as όντως/Ontos, an AI-turned-god who Earth scientists used to create the world of Xenoblade Chronicles, and who remains present throughout the entire game (2010)
- EDI (Enhanced Defense Intelligence), the AI housed within a "quantum bluebox" aboard the Normandy SR-2 in Mass Effect 2. EDI controls the Normandy's cyberwarfare suite during combat, but is blocked from directly accessing any other part of the ship's systems, due to the potential danger of EDI going rogue. (2010)
- Harbinger, is the tentative name for the leader of the main antagonist faction of Mass Effect 2. It commands an alien race known as the Collectors through the "Collector General." Like Sovereign, from the original Mass Effect, it belongs to the same race of ancient sentient machines, known as the "Reapers". (2010)
- Harmonia, the DarkStar One's main AI that controls the player ship's systems in the space-sim game DarkStar One (2010)
- Legion, the given name for a geth platform in Mass Effect 2, housing a single gestalt consciousness composed of 1,183 virtually intelligent "runtimes", which share information amongst themselves and build "consensus" in a form of networked artificial intelligence. Legion claims that all geth are pieces of a "shattered mind", and that the primary goal of the geth race is to unify all runtimes in a single piece of hardware. (2010)
- The Thinker (Rapture Operational Data Interpreter Network -R.O.D.I.N.-), the mainframe computer invented to process all of the automation in the underwater city of Rapture, in the single-player DLC for BioShock 2: Minerva's Den (2010)
- Yes Man, a security robot programmed to be perpetually agreeable in Fallout New Vegas (2010)
- Eliza Cassan, the mysterious news reporter from Deus Ex: Human Revolution. It is later revealed that she is an extremely sophisticated, self-aware artificial intelligence. (2011)
- ADA (A Detection Algorithm), from Google's ARG Ingress (2012)
- DCPU-16, the popular 16bit computer in the 0x10^{c} universe (2012)
- Roland, shipboard AI of the UNSC ship Infinity in the Halo franchise first appearing in Halo 4 (2012)
- M.I.K.E. (Memetic Installation Keeper Engine), from Etrian Odyssey Untold: The Millennium Girl (2013)
- ctOS (central Operating System), a mainframe computer in Watch Dogs that the player is capable of hacking into (2014)
- ctOS 2.0, an updated version of ctOS used to manage the city of San Francisco in the game Watch dogs 2 (2016)
- Rasputin, An AI "warmind" created for the purpose of defending the Earth from any hostile threats in the video game Destiny (2014)
- Ghost, the AI interface that, through its link with the planet-sized Traveler, resurrects Guardians, also from the video game Destiny (2014)
- XANADU, a simulation computer composed of many smaller computers, stored in a cavern in Act III of the video game Kentucky Route Zero (2014)
- TIS-100 (Tessellated Intelligence System), a fictional mysterious computer from the early 1980s that carries cryptic messages from unknown author, from the game TIS-100 (2015)
- Governor Sloan, AI in control of the independent colony of Meridian in Halo 5: Guardians (2015)
- 031 Exuberant Witness, Forerunner AI in charge of the Genesis installation Halo 5: Guardians (2015)
- Kaizen-85, the Nautilus′ main AI that runs a cruise spaceship that is devoid of its human crew, from the game Event[0] (2016)
- MS-Alice, an AI computer who was created by Marco in Metal Slug Attack (2016)
- VEGA, an artificial intelligence found in Doom (2016).
- Star Dream, A reality-warping supercomputer who acts as the overarching antagonist of Kirby: Planet Robobot. They are later revealed to be a Galactic Nova, wish-granting stars that first appeared in Kirby Super Star.
- Athena, the artificial intelligence used to announce locations in Overwatch (2016), and an announcer in Heroes of the Storm (2015)
- Central, a sophisticated wetware AI that oversees the infrastructure of the futuristic city of Newton in the game Technobabylon (2015)
- Monika, short for Monitor Kernel Access, or Monika.chr, an artificial intelligence seeking to escape the dating simulator she was created for in Doki Doki Literature Club! (2017)
- SAM, short for Simulated Adaptive Matrix. An AI created by Alec Ryder in Mass Effect: Andromeda (2017)
- GAIA, a powerful and supremely advanced A.I. that used a suite of nine subordinate functions to oversee Project Zero Dawn's successful restoration of life to Earth after its eradication by the Faro Plague in Horizon Zero Dawn (2017)
- SAM (Systems Administration and Maintenance), the AI of the titular space station in Observation (2019).
- Tacputer, a non-sentient military computer, and HR Computer, a seemingly non-sentient Human Resources computer, in Void Bastards (2019).
- Iterators semi-biological, city-sized supercomputers from Rain World. Built to brute-force a solution for the "Great Problem". Two Iterators can be found in game, Five Pebbles and Looks To The Moon (or Big Sis Moon), with many more being mentioned by name or seen in backgrounds.
- Commander Tartar from Splatoon 2: Octo Expansion
- Sage from Starlink: Battle for Atlas
- Turing, Baby Blue, and Big Blue from 2064: Read Only Memories
- A.R.I.D from The Fall

=== 2020s ===
- Queen (Serial Number Q5U4EX7YY2E9N), a computer in a public library who appears as a sentient being in the Dark World in Deltarune Chapter 2 (2021)
- Z5 Powerlance, a retro computer that can be used to "download" games via BBS, from the game Last Call BBS (2022)
- The Weapon, an AI designed to imitate Cortana to capture her for deletion in Halo Infinite.
- O.R.C.A., short for Omiscient Recording Computer of Alterna, an archivial computer system created for the purpose of preserving the knowledge gathered by the surviving humans of Alterna, as well as guiding Agent 3 through the story mode of Splatoon 3.
- Squid and Unicorn, two opposing AI supercomputers from Will You Snail?, a platformer game developed independently by Jonas Tyroller of Grizzly Games (2022)

== Board games and role-playing games ==
- A.R.C.H.I.E. Three, the supercomputer that arose from the ashes of nuclear war to become a major player in the events of Palladium Books' Rifts
- The Autochthon, the extradimensional AI that secretly controls Iteration X, in White Wolf Publishing's Mage: The Ascension
- The Computer, from West End Games' Paranoia role-playing game
- Crime Computer, from the Milton Bradley Manhunter board game
- Deus, the malevolent AI built by Renraku from the Shadowrun role-playing game, which took over the Renraku Arcology before escaping into the Matrix
- Mirage, the oldest AI from Shadowrun, built to assist the US military in combating the original Crash Virus in 2029
- Megara, a sophisticated program built by Renraku in Shadowrun, which achieved sentience after falling in love with a hacker
- Omega Virus, microscopic nano-phages that build a singular intelligence (foreign AI) in the Battlestat1 computer core and take over the space station in the board game by Milton Bradley.

== Unsorted works ==
- SARA, TOM's A.I. matrix companion from Toonami
- The CENTRAL SCRUTINIZER, narrator from Frank Zappa's Joe's Garage
- Ritsu / Autonomous Intelligence Fixed Artillery, from Assassination Classroom
- Tandy 400, Compy 386, Lappy 486, Compé, and Lappier, Strong Bad's computers in Homestar Runner (Tandy is a real company, but never produced a 400 model)
- Hyper Hegel, an extremely slow computer run with burning wood in monochrom's Soviet Unterzoegersdorf universe
- A.J.G.L.U. 2000 (Archie Joke Generating Laugh Unit), a running-gag from the Comics Curmudgeon, depicting a computer who does not quite understand human humor, but nonetheless is employed to write the jokes for the Archie Comics strip
- Li’l Hal (colloquially known as the Auto-Responder or simply AR), a teen boy's sarcastic brain-clone-turned-sentient-chatbot that lives inside a pair of pointy anime sunglasses in Homestuck.
- CADIE (Cognitive Autoheuristic Distributed-Intelligence Entity), from Google's 2009 April Fools Story

== See also ==
- Artificial intelligence in fiction
- List of films about computers
- Sentient computers
- List of fictional robots and androids
- List of fictional cyborgs
- List of fictional gynoids
