= DFJ (disambiguation) =

Draper Fisher Jurvetson is a venture capital firm.

DFJ may also refer to:

- Democratic Federal Yugoslavia, a former country

== See also ==
- D. F. Jones
