= The Ships of Earth =

1994 novel by Orson Scott Card

- Author: Orson Scott Card
- Cover artist: Keith Parkinson
- Language: English
- Series: Homecoming Saga
- Genre: Science fiction
- Publisher: Tor Books
- Publication date: 1994
- Publication place: United States
- Media type: Print (Hardcover & Paperback)
- Pages: 382
- ISBN: 0-312-85659-8
- OCLC: 29359905
- Dewey Decimal: 813/.54 20
- LC Class: PS3553.A655 S54 1994
- Preceded by: The Call of Earth
- Followed by: Earthfall

The Ships of Earth (1994) is a science fiction novel by American writer Orson Scott Card. It is the third book of the Homecoming Saga, a fictionalization of the first few hundred years recorded in the Book of Mormon.

== Plot summary ==
This book focuses on the struggles between the pioneers to establish a new social order now that they have left Basilica. The new society is opposite to that of the previous societies - male dominated instead of female dominated, monogamous and lifelong marriages instead of the yearly contracts of Basilica.

The struggles between the characters ultimately come down to the struggles between Nafai and Elemak, two sons of Volemak. Nafai leads the faction who have faith in the Oversoul, while Elemak leads the faction who want desperately to return to the civilization of doomed Basilica. Both are ostensibly under the leadership of Volemak (and not Rasa, as they had been in the city).

The settlers, after years of traveling, finally arrive in a land lost in ancient times which holds the secret of the Oversoul. Additionally, many children are born, all in their preparation for the ultimate journey to Earth.

The book offers an interesting justification of the social structures of the Hebrew tribes in Genesis, all while the originally powerful female characters gradually succumb to the new hierarchy of "men" and "wives." Only one character - Shedemei, the brilliant geneticist, thinks about this problem.

The focus in on the group dynamics of the new tribe as they journey where the Oversoul guides them.

Prophetic dreams abound, mostly involving giant rats and bats ("diggers" and "angels"). The Oversoul discovers itself.

== See also ==
- List of works by Orson Scott Card
