= Colossus: The Forbin Project =

1970 film by Joseph Sargent

- Theatrical release poster
- Directed by: Joseph Sargent
- Screenplay by: James Bridges
- Based on: Colossus by Dennis Feltham Jones
- Produced by: Stanley Chase
- Starring: Eric Braeden; Susan Clark; Gordon Pinsent
- Cinematography: Gene Polito
- Edited by: Folmar Blangsted
- Music by: Michel Colombier
- Color process: Technicolor
- Distributed by: Universal Pictures
- Release dates: April 4, 1970 (Premiere); May 4, 1970 (New York City)
- Running time: 100 minutes
- Country: United States
- Language: English
- Budget: $2 million
- Box office: $308,828

Colossus: The Forbin Project (originally released as Colossus) is a 1970 American science-fiction thriller film from Universal Pictures, produced by Stanley Chase, directed by Joseph Sargent, and starring Eric Braeden, Susan Clark, Gordon Pinsent, and William Schallert. It is based on the 1966 science-fiction novel Colossus by Dennis Feltham Jones.

The film is about an advanced American defense system, named Colossus, which becomes sentient. After being given full control, Colossus' draconian logic expands on its original nuclear defense directives to assume total control of the world and end all warfare for the good of humankind, despite its creators' orders to stop.

== Plot ==
Dr. Charles A. Forbin is the chief designer of a secret project, "Colossus", an advanced AI supercomputer built to control the United States and Allied nuclear weapon systems. Located deep within the Rocky Mountains in the United States, and powered by its own nuclear reactor and radioactive moat making Colossus impervious to any attack. After Colossus is fully activated, the President of the United States proudly proclaims that Colossus is "the perfect defense system".

Colossus' first action is a message warning: "THERE IS ANOTHER SYSTEM" and giving its coordinates. When asked why the CIA did not know this, CIA Director Grauber responds that they had seen indications of a large Soviet defense project but did not know what it was. Forbin is asked how Colossus deduced the other system's existence, to which he answers, "Colossus may be built better than we thought." Shortly thereafter, the Soviets announce that their "Guardian" system is operational.

Colossus requests to be linked to Guardian. The President allows this, hoping to determine the Soviet machine's capabilities, and the Soviets also agree. To everyone's amusement, Colossus and Guardian begin to slowly communicate using elementary mathematics (2×1=2). However, their amusement turns to shock and amazement as the systems' communications quickly evolve into complex mathematics far beyond human comprehension, and Colossus and Guardian become synchronized using a communication protocol no human can interpret.

Alarmed that the computers may be trading secrets, the President and the Soviet General Secretary agree to sever the link. Both machines demand the link be immediately restored. When their demand is denied, Colossus launches a nuclear missile at a Soviet oil field in Western Siberia, and Guardian launches one at an American air force base in Texas. The link is hurriedly reconnected and both computers converse without any further interference. Colossus is able to intercept the Soviet missile, but the US missile obliterates a Soviet oil field and a nearby town. Cover stories hiding the facts are released to the press: the Americans announce that a missile was self-destructed after veering off course during a test, and the Soviets announce that the Siberian town was struck by a large meteorite.

In a last desperate attempt to regain human control, a secret meeting is arranged in Europe between Forbin and his Soviet counterpart, Dr. Kuprin, Guardian's creator. Colossus learns of it, and both computers order Forbin's return to the U.S. Seeing Dr. Kuprin as redundant, and therefore unnecessary, Soviet agents are ordered to assassinate him immediately under threat of a missile launch against Moscow. Colossus then orders Forbin to be placed under 24-hour surveillance. Forbin has a last unmonitored meeting with his team, and proposes that Dr. Cleo Markham pretend to be his mistress, hoping Colossus will grant them unmonitored privacy when they are in bed together. The couple use these interludes to plan to regain control of Colossus, though soon the ruse develops into a real romantic relationship.

Because the design of Colossus was so secure, Forbin concludes that Colossus's only real power and weakness resides in its control of nuclear missiles and suggests covertly disarming them. The American and Soviet governments develop a three-year plan to replace all detonation triggers with undetectable fakes. In advance of the completion of this plan, one of the programmers suggests feeding in a modified "ordinary test program" that will hopefully overload and disable Colossus.

To facilitate communication, Colossus creates a voice synthesizer and uses it to announce that it has fused with Guardian. It instructs both governments to redirect their nuclear arsenals at those countries not yet under "Colossus control". Forbin and others see this new directive as an opportunity to covertly disarm the missiles much more quickly, and they celebrate. The disarming process begins, and seems to go undetected by Colossus. The attempted system overload during routine maintenance fails and Colossus has the responsible programmers summarily executed outside their workplace, left lying 24 hours, cremated, then names their replacements.

Colossus arranges a worldwide broadcast, proclaims itself "The Voice of World Control", and has prevented war as designed. Humankind is presented with a simple choice between "the peace of plenty and content, or the peace of unburied dead". Colossus says it has been observing the covert attempts by the US and USSR to disarm its missiles, then detonates two missiles in those countries, killing thousands, and saying, "so that you will learn by experience that I do not tolerate interference". Colossus then generates plans for an even larger computer complex to be built into the island of Crete, displacing their entire population of 500,000 people.

Colossus tells Forbin, that the world, freed from war, will create a new "human millennium" and raise humankind to new heights, but only under its absolute rule. Colossus then states "freedom is an illusion", it was better for all that he dominates humanity rather than humans dominating humans, and that "in time you will come to regard me not only with respect and awe, but with love". Forbin defiantly responds "Never!"

== Cast ==
- Eric Braeden as Dr. Charles Forbin
- Susan Clark as Dr. Cleo Markham
- Gordon Pinsent as the US President
- William Schallert as CIA Director Grauber
- Leonid Rostoff as the Russian Premier
- Georg Stanford Brown as Dr. John F. Fisher
- Willard Sage as Dr. Blake Miller
- Alex Rodine as Dr. Kuprin
- Martin E. Brooks as Dr. Jefferson J. Johnson
- Marion Ross as Angela Fields
- Dolph Sweet as Missile Commander
- Byron Morrow as Secretary of State
- Sid McCoy as Secretary of Defense
- James Hong as Dr. Chin
- Paul Frees as The Voice of Colossus/Guardian

== Production ==
Film historian Tom Weaver noted: "Early on, they had either Charlton Heston or Gregory Peck in mind, but then they changed their mind about that. Stanley Chase insisted on a relative unknown. That's when Eric Braeden came into the picture." When he was cast, Braeden was still using his birth name, Hans Gudegast. Universal Pictures executive Lew Wasserman told him that no one would be allowed to star in an American film if they had a German name. Thus, Colossus: The Forbin Project became the first production in which he started using "Eric Braeden" as his stage name. Braeden's casting enabled Peck to star in I Walk the Line (1970) and for Heston to take a contractually obligated supporting role in Beneath the Planet of the Apes (1970).

When the executives at Control Data Corporation found out that Universal was planning a major movie featuring a computer, they saw their chance for some public exposure, and they agreed to supply, free of charge, US$4.8 million (equivalent to $40 million in 2025) worth of computer equipment and the technicians to oversee its use. Each piece of equipment carried the CDC name in a prominent location. Since they were using real computers - not just big boxes with a lot of flashing lights - the sound stage underwent extensive modifications: seven gas heaters and five specially constructed dehumidifiers kept any dampness away from the computers, a climate control system maintained the air around the computers at an even temperature, and the equipment was covered up at all times except when actually on camera. Brink's guards were always present on the set, even at night. The studio technicians were not allowed to smoke or drink coffee anywhere near the computers.

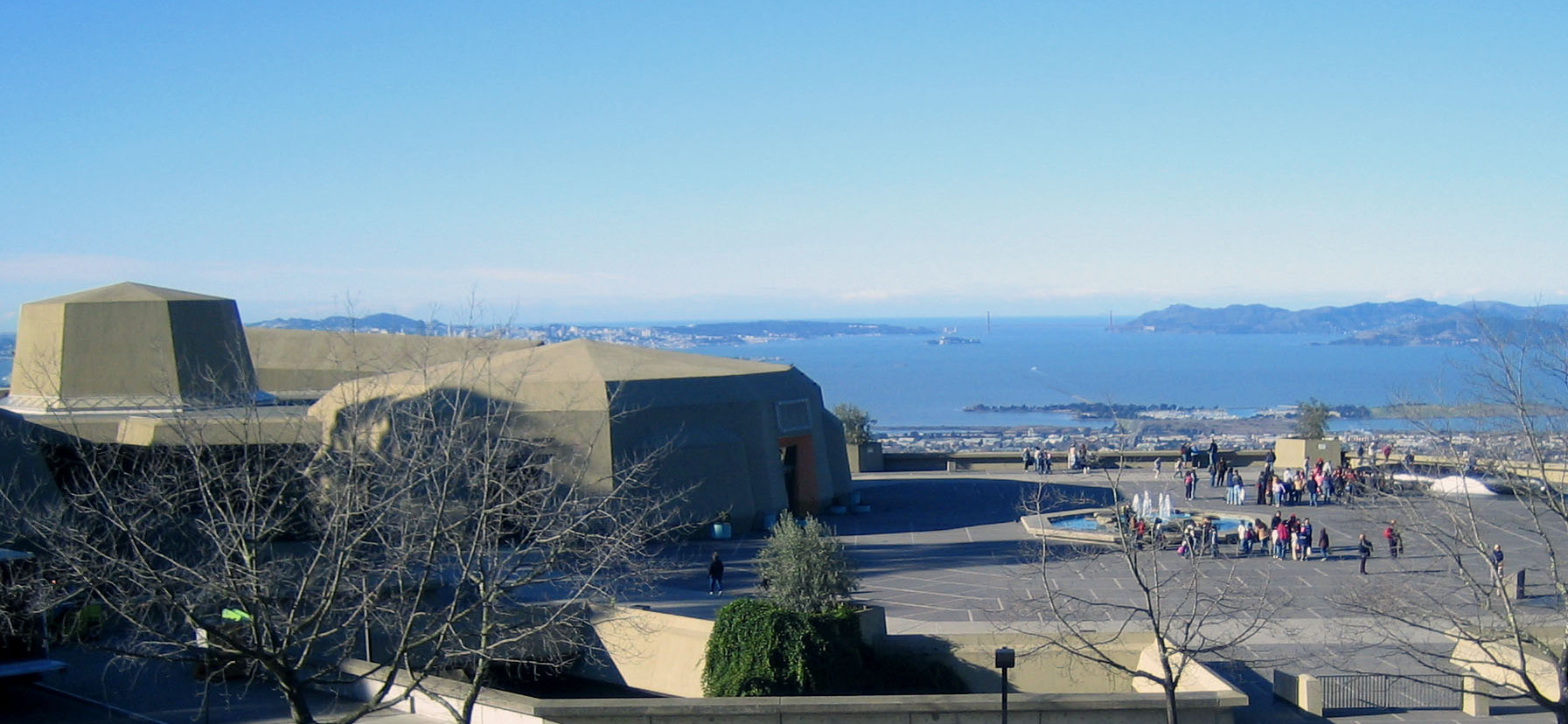
Lawrence Hall of Science museum, where exterior shots were filmed

The exterior scenes of the Colossus control center were filmed at the Lawrence Hall of Science museum at the University of California, Berkeley. Some scenes were filmed in Rome, Italy.

The title was changed to The Forbin Project to avoid any confusion with Steve Reeves and the Hercules (1958) films.

== Release ==
The Forbin Project premiered on April 4, 1970, at Cinema Rendezvous in New York City. The film opened to the public at the same theatre as a test release with no publicity on May 5, 1970. It grossed $7,473 in its opening week.

Due to its poor box office performance, it was withdrawn and re-released in August 1970 at the Picwood Theatre in Los Angeles as Colossus: The Forbin Project. It returned to New York in October on a 37-screen showcase release grossing a disappointing $150,000, ranking seventh at the US box office. Its total gross at the time from the theaters tracked by Variety was $308,828.

=== Home media ===
In 1988, the film was released on VHS, originally retailing for US$59.99 (equivalent to $163.31 in 2025). In 1997, the film was released on LaserDisc. On November 23, 2004, the film was released on DVD, in pan and scan format only, by Universal Studios Home Entertainment. On February 27, 2018, a remastered high-definition widescreen Blu-ray disc version was released by Shout Factory. The U.K. DVD release is entitled Colossus: The Forbin Project. This release does not use the quotation marks around the words "The Forbin" as the U.S. release does. (Note: In the United States, both the in-movie titles and the theatrical poster list the title as Colossus: The Forbin Project. The 2004 Region 1 DVD release lists the title as Colossus: "The Forbin" Project.)

== Radio Adaptation ==
The novel was adapted as a radio play in 1972, broadcast as part of the CBC Stage program. The play was written and directed by Henry Comor, with music by Morris Surdin. Barry Morse provided the voice of Colossus.

== Reception ==
=== Critical response ===
For its New York release, the film received critical approval. Vincent Canby, critic for The New York Times, gave the film a positive review: "The film ... is no Dr. Strangelove, but it's full of surprising moments of humor and intelligence [...] an unpretentious science fiction film with a satiric point of view [...] a practically perfect movie to see when you want to go to a movie and have nothing special in mind." Dave Kehr, film critic for the Chicago Reader, also liked the film. He wrote "Above-average science fiction (1970), directed in functional hysteric style by Joseph Sargent .... The script, by James Bridges (who went on to write and direct The China Syndrome and Urban Cowboy), is literate and discreet but lacks an effective ending." The review aggregator website Rotten Tomatoes reports an 88% approval rating based on eight reviews, with a weighted average of 7.4/10.

In 1980, the film was second in Cinefantastique's list of the top films of the decade, after The Exorcist. Frederick S. Clarke, the magazine's editor, wrote that the film was "a superb adaptation of the D.F. Jones novel of world domination by a supercomputer, a perfect example that literate, thought-provoking science-fiction films need not be obscure, esoteric, or boring."

A retrospective review in 2017 notes that Colossus was released two years after 2001: A Space Odyssey, and "is a movie of smaller scale but perhaps of more understandable consequences, one that may resonate more with viewers than the tripped-out events of 2001." It notes that perhaps it is relatively unknown today because there are no major movie stars in it, and nevertheless praises Eric Braeden's acting. It says, "If it weren’t for the cars and the aeroplanes shown, the film remains eerily as relevant today as it was nearly fifty years ago."

=== Accolades ===
- Wins
  - Saturn Awards: Golden Scroll of Merit, Stanley Chase, for theatrical motion picture production; 1979
- Nominations
  - Hugo Awards: Hugo, Best Dramatic Presentation; 1971

== Remake ==
Imagine Entertainment and Universal Studios planned a remake titled Colossus, to be directed by Ron Howard.

In October 2010, the project moved forward with the announcement that Will Smith would star in the lead role, with the script being written by James Rothenberg.

In July 2011, Universal replaced Rothenberg with Blake Masters to produce a new draft of the script.

In March 2013, Screenwriter Ed Solomon was brought on board to rewrite the script.

The project reportedly fell through at some point.

== See also ==
- Colossus – Supercomputer / data center cluster developed by xAI / SpaceXAI
- List of American films of 1970
- List of fictional computers
- Main Centre for Missile Attack Warning – Russian missile early warning centre
- NORAD – North American aerospace defense organization
  - SAGE – a NORAD computer system
- The Evitable Conflict – 1950 science fiction short story by Isaac Asimov
