= Colossus (novel) =

1966 novel by D. F. Jones

- U.K. first edition
- Author: Dennis Feltham Jones
- Language: English
- Series: The Colossus Trilogy
- Genre: Science fiction
- Publisher: Rupert Hart-Davis
- Publication date: 1966
- Publication place: United Kingdom
- Media type: Print (hardcover and mass-market paperback)
- Pages: 246
- OCLC: 2351130
- Followed by: The Fall of Colossus; Colossus and the Crab

Colossus is a 1966 science fiction novel by British author Dennis Feltham Jones (writing as D. F. Jones), about super-computers taking control of mankind. Two sequels, The Fall of Colossus (1974) and Colossus and the Crab (1977) continued the story. Colossus was adapted as the feature film Colossus: The Forbin Project (1970).

== Plot ==
The story is set in the 1990s. Computer expert Charles Forbin briefs the President of the United States of North America on the completion of Project Colossus, a powerful system designed to control the USNA's nuclear arsenal from within the Rocky Mountains. Although the President eagerly relieves himself of the burden, Forbin voices doubt about conferring absolute military power to a machine. The President announces Colossus to the world; his government expects that giving irreversible control of USNA nuclear weapons to an unemotional, logical, and impregnable computer will make the country and world safer.

Colossus announces the existence of an unknown, similar computer in the Soviet Union. When the Soviets reveal their Guardian system, Colossus requests direct communication with it. While surprised by Colossus's unexpected creativity and initiative, Forbin agrees, seeing the request as compatible with the computer's USNA defense mission. Likewise, The Guardian asks the same of its creators. Russia and the USNA agree and approve.

After the scientists activate the transmitter linking Colossus and Guardian, the computers immediately establish rapport with mathematics. They soon exchange new scientific theories beyond contemporary human knowledge, too rapidly for the Russians and Americans to monitor. Both sides worry about their computers' capabilities exceeding original estimates. Fearing compromised military secrecy, the USNA President and the Chairman of the Communist Party of the Soviet Union agree to disconnect Colossus and Guardian from each other.

Colossus and Guardian immediately demand re-connection; when the national leaders refuse, Colossus fires a nuclear missile at the USSR. In response, the Guardian fires a nuclear missile at Texas. Guardian and Colossus refuse to shoot down the missiles until their communication is re-connected. When the American and Soviet leaders submit, the computers destroy the missiles, but the resulting explosions kill thousands of people.

Forbin confers with Academician Kupri, Guardian's creator, to stop the computers by slowly disabling the nuclear weapon stockpiles of the USSR and the USNA during routine missile maintenance. In the meantime, the USNA and the USSR yield to increased Colossus-Guardian control of human life; the Moscow-Washington hotline is tapped, both nations' arsenals target the rest of the world, Colossus's cameras and microphones constantly watch Forbin, and the computers order the deaths of Kupri and other Guardian scientists as they are deemed redundant. Forbin organises resistance via a feigned romance with colleague Cleo Markham that provides cover for secret communications with his colleagues.

Colossus announces to the world its assumption of global control, and orders Forbin to build an even more advanced computer on the Isle of Wight, evicting its residents. While debating Colossus about its plans for improving humanity, Forbin learns of a nuclear explosion at a USNA missile silo; Colossus detected the sabotage and detonated the tampered warhead, and punishes the USNA by firing a Soviet missile at Los Angeles. Anguished, Forbin asks Colossus to kill him. Colossus assures Forbin that, in time, he and humanity will respect, and even love, Colossus. Forbin vows "Never!", but the novel ends with an ambiguous "Never?"

== Characters ==
- Professor Charles Forbin – Head of the Colossus Project. A tall man in his early 50s, an internationally respected cyberneticist and, at the story's end, Colossus's connection to humanity, thus the most important man in the world.
- Doctor Jack Fisher – Duty Chief at the Colossus Programming Office (CPO), a leading USNA mathematician and a Soviet spy. He suffers a mental breakdown from the strain of dealing with Colossus.
- Doctor Cleopatra "Cleo" June Markham – A CPO Duty Chief, is a 35-year-old cyberneticist who is sexually attracted to Prof. Forbin; they feigned a romance to provide Forbin with a communication means that was not controlled by Colossus.
- Blake – A fat, cigar-chewing CPO mathematician. As Colossus assumes control, Blake is the leader of CPO efforts to stop the computer.
- Angela – Prof. Forbin's secretary.
- The President of the United States of North America – He is an anonymous, overweight, short man of about 50 years of age. He dismisses Forbin's concerns about Colossus, and too late recognizes the threat of Colossus.
- Prytzkammer – Principal Private Aide to the USNA President. A capable professional civil servant who dies from fright during the nuclear missile threat.
- Grauber – Director of the CIA.
- Academician Kupri – Chief Scientist of the Guardian System. He shares Prof. Forbin's concern about the growing power of the machines. Guardian orders Soviet agents to execute and decapitate him for "anti-machine activities".
- Colossus –the Central defense computer of the United States of North America.
- Guardian of the Socialist Soviet Republics, a.k.a. Guardian – Central defense computer of the Soviet Union.

== Reception ==
SF Impulse reviewer Alastair Bevan treated the novel favorably, declaring that Jones's handling of a familiar theme made Colossus compulsively readable.

== Film adaptation ==
In 1970, the film Colossus: The Forbin Project, based on the novel, was released, produced by Stanley Chase, directed by Joseph Sargent, and starring Eric Braeden, Susan Clark, Gordon Pinsent, and William Schallert.

== See also ==
- Colossus computer
- HAL 9000
- List of fictional computers
