= Earthborn =

1995 novel by Orson Scott Card

- Author: Orson Scott Card
- Cover artist: Keith Parkinson
- Language: English
- Series: Homecoming Saga
- Genre: Science fiction
- Publisher: Tor Books
- Publication date: 1995
- Publication place: United States
- Media type: Print (Hardcover & Paperback)
- Pages: 378
- ISBN: 0-312-93040-2
- OCLC: 32329155
- Dewey Decimal: 813/.54 20
- LC Class: PS3553.A655 E47 1995
- Preceded by: Earthfall

Earthborn (1995) is a science fiction book by American writer Orson Scott Card, the concluding fifth book of the Homecoming Saga. The series is a fictionalization of the first few hundred years recorded in the Book of Mormon.

== Plot summary ==
Five centuries after the conclusion of Earthfall, there is only one original colonist from Harmony: Shedemei, who now wears the Cloak of the Starmaster (a device that links her to the Oversoul). After hundreds of years, the descendants of Nafai and Elemak have built cities and towns - yet never forgetting the enmity between the two brothers. After hundreds of years, the Oversoul still has not achieved its original purpose: to find the Keeper of Earth, the central intelligence that alone can repair the Oversoul's damaged counterpart at Harmony.

But now, the Keeper has once again begun to spread its influence. Heeding the dreams below, Shedemei has decided to return to Earth.

The last book in the Homecoming saga marks a departure from the style and storyline of the previous four. All of the characters from the previous novels (except Shedemei) are long dead. The central conflict between Nafai and Elemak is represented in their descendants, but takes a back seat in this book. The focus is on the struggles within the descendants of those who followed Nafai. The king of Darakemba (an empire founded by the Nafaris), his children, and his advisers, along with the high priest of Darakemba, his children, and his converts, provide the main actions in the story.

== Religious overtones ==
The science fiction elements in this book are overshadowed by the blossoming of the religious overtones (Mormon) evident since the first book. The emphasis on faith in the invisible Keeper, the evils of pride, and the importance of tolerance are consistently woven within the struggles of the characters.

== See also ==
- List of works by Orson Scott Card
- Orson Scott Card
