= The Call of Earth =

1992 novel by Orson Scott Card

- Author: Orson Scott Card
- Cover artist: Keith Parkinson
- Language: English
- Series: Homecoming Saga
- Genre: Science fiction
- Publisher: Tor Books
- Publication date: 1992
- Publication place: United States
- Media type: Print (Hardcover & Paperback)
- Pages: 304
- ISBN: 0-312-93037-2
- OCLC: 26800462
- Dewey Decimal: 813/.54 20
- LC Class: PS3553.A655 C34 1993
- Preceded by: The Memory of Earth
- Followed by: The Ships of Earth

The Call of Earth (1992) is a science fiction novel by American writer Orson Scott Card. It the second book of the Homecoming Saga, a fictionalization of the first few hundred years recorded in the Book of Mormon.

== Plot summary ==
The book focuses on several key events that happen after Nafai, Elemak, Issib, Mebbekew, Zdorab and the father Volemak leave for the desert. Elemak has a dream from the Oversoul, foretelling Volemak's sons going back to the city of Basilica to get wives. The sons proceed to Nafai's and Issib's mother, Rasa, who is attempting to keep order within the city. However Hushidh, a raveler (one who can see, and manipulate ties between people) under Rasa's care, makes the disastrous mistake of severing the ties between Rashgallivak and his men, leading to widespread riots across the city.

At the same time, General Moozh, leader of the "Wetheads" nation (Gorayni), is attempting to conquer cities around Basilica. He sees a strategic chance, and taking only 1000 soldiers, marches across the desert to conquer the city. He arrives in time to help the local city guard quell the uprising, and slowly begins taking control of its affairs.

The remainder of the book deals with Nafai and his brothers' (Elemak and Mebbekew, who had come) attempts at finding wives. In the end, they are all forced into a house arrest along with Rasa, where Elemak takes Eiadh as his wife, Mebbekew takes Dol, Nafai takes Luet, the waterseer, with Rasa and Hushidh deciding to come as wives for Volemak and Issib, respectively. Shedemei (a Basilican geneticist) is dragged along with enough plants and animals to populate the future earth with new species, also as a wife to Zdorab.

The ending comes when Moozh decides to marry Hushidh to politically tie himself with the city. Hushidh's original mother arrives to stop the ceremony, since Hushidh is actually the daughter of Moozh. Nafai's party is escorted out of the city with the women and supplies for the camp.

Moozh ends up conquering the "Wetheads" he had been working for, while his Basilican second-in-command defends the city against the rival nation, Potokgavan. In the end he is killed during an invasion and Basilica falls, scattering the citizens to various other nations and cities on Harmony. Earlier in the book, the Oversoul had revealed the purpose of this dispersal was to force people with a strong connection to it to breed with people who had a weak connection, and so delay the eventual time when the Oversoul loses control of the people of Harmony.

== Characters ==
The characters listed here are those whose primary role is in The Call of Earth. For other characters, see Homecoming Saga.

- General Vozmuzhalnoy Vozmozhno: Better known as Moozh, a leader of the army of the Imperator (a godlike figure). He engineers a takeover of Basilica, freeing it from the lordship of the remains of Gaballufix's men but surreptitiously advancing his own control. Although this starts Basilica on the path to loss of its traditional female-dominated structure, it ends up bringing stability in the short term. Moozh is sensitive to the Oversoul's communication and inducement of "stupidity", though he believes such sensations to come from God. Since he stubbornly sets himself against "God's plans", the Oversoul learns the tactic of reverse psychology and pushes Moozh to forget those things that it actually wants him to act on.
- Thirsty: A holy woman of the desert, and the mother of Hushidh and Luet. She too hears the Oversoul's commands clearly, and follows them faithfully even as she rages against their unfairness. After leaving her daughters with Rasa, she is left alone by the Oversoul for many years, during which she marries and raises a family. The Oversoul then orders her back to Basilica to reveal the identity of Hushidh's and Luet's father, and deliver the announcement that seals the Oversoul's plan for the city.
- General Plodorodnuy: "Plod", Moozh's 'best friend' and closest confidant. Actually a spy sent to watch him and report his actions to the Imperator, Moozh has him killed and utilizes his death to advance his own ambitions.
- Smelost: A Basilican guard. Sent to Moozh's camp to recruit the help of the Gorayni, he ends up faithfully believing in Moozh's strategy - which involves his own death. Smelost takes the blame for the murder of Plod, shouting "For Gaballufix! Death to the Imperator!" This sets up the Gorayni to oppose Gaballufix.
