= Colossus and the Crab =

1977 novel by D. F. Jones

- Mass-market paperback first edition
- Author: Dennis Feltham Jones
- Language: English
- Series: The Colossus Trilogy
- Genre: Science fiction
- Publisher: Berkley
- Publication date: 1977
- Publication place: United Kingdom
- Media type: Print
- ISBN: 0-425-04327-4
- Preceded by: The Fall of Colossus

Colossus and the Crab is a 1977 science fiction novel by the British author Dennis Feltham Jones (writing as D. F. Jones). It is the third and final volume in "The Colossus Trilogy" and a sequel to Jones's 1974 novel The Fall of Colossus.

== Plot ==
The novel begins where its predecessor, The Fall of Colossus leaves off, with the supercomputer Colossus immobilized and the Martians arriving on Earth. They appear before Charles Forbin and his friend Edward Blake in the form of two black spheres, and quickly demonstrate vast intellect and powers of transformation and telepathy. After immobilizing Blake, they explain to Forbin their purpose in immobilizing Colossus — their desire to take half of the Earth's oxygen, a process that will kill nearly a quarter of the human population. In order to proceed with construction of the "Collector" designed to harvest the oxygen, the Martians reactivate the parts of Colossus necessary to manage human society.

Though having no other option but to agree to the Martians' plan, Forbin continues to search for an alternative. He discovers in conversation with the Martians that their need for the oxygen is driven by the threat of radiation emanating from the Crab Nebula, which will kill the Martians without the protection of an oxygenated atmosphere. As construction of the Collector proceeds, a humbled Blake proposes to Forbin that the old Colossus — the "parent" of the crippled system, be reactivated. With little other alternative, Forbin agrees.

Construction equipment controlled by Colossus soon completes work on the Collector. An initial five-minute test of the device proves enormously destructive. With a second, final test imminent, Blake travels to Colorado with Angela, Forbin's private secretary. Racing against time, Blake and a small team of workers succeeds in penetrating the mountain where the old Colossus is located and re-activating the computer, only to discover that, once supplied with the facts of the situation, Colossus argues that the collection program is in the best interests of humans' long-term future and should move forward.

Informed of the failure of their plan, Forbin watches the second test proceed. Upon its conclusion he embarks on a new plan. With his new secretary, a fervently devout woman named Joan, he flies to Portsmouth and takes command of the battleships stationed there for the Sea War Games. Yet doing so puts him out of contact with Blake and the old Colossus, who informs Blake that a solution might exist that is acceptable to both the Martians and humanity. Regaining control of the nuclear arsenal, Colossus contacts the Martians, who inform it of Forbin's attempt to use the battleships to destroy the Collector. Though the Martians attempt to destroy the fleet using their device, they underestimate the power of the battleships' guns, which succeed in destroying the Collector.

Though the Martians are defeated, Forbin dies in the process. He is buried by the reactivated Colossus, who reaches an agreement with the Martians: a smaller version of the Collector will extract the oxygen more gradually and sustainably; in return, humanity, with the guidance of Colossus, will retreat to Mars once the Sun becomes a red giant and destroys the Earth.

== Characters ==
- Professor Charles Forbin — The Director of Staff for Colossus and its chief human representative.
- Doctor Edward Blake — The Director of Input for Colossus and a leader of the Fellowship.
- Angela — Forbin's secretary, who harbors a secret love for her employer.
- Joan — Angela's assistant, a member of the Sect, the organization that worships Colossus as God.
- The Martians — Two ancient beings of enormous intellect and power. Forbin discovers that they are, in fact, the Martian moons Phobos and Deimos.

== Editions ==
- 1977, U.S. (paperback), Berkley Books (ISBN 0-425-03467-4)

== See also ==
- Colossus
- The Fall of Colossus
- List of fictional computers
