= The Fall of Colossus =

1974 novel by D. F. Jones

- Hardcover first edition
- Author: Dennis Feltham Jones
- Cover artist: Paul Lehr
- Language: English
- Series: The Colossus Trilogy
- Genre: Science fiction
- Publisher: Putnam
- Publication date: 1974
- Publication place: United Kingdom
- Media type: Print (hardcover and mass-market paperback)
- Pages: 186
- ISBN: 0-399-11282-0
- OCLC: 864061
- Dewey Decimal: 823/.9/14
- LC Class: PZ4.J752 Fal3 PR6060.O496
- Preceded by: Colossus
- Followed by: Colossus and the Crab

The Fall of Colossus is a 1974 science fiction novel written by the British author Dennis Feltham Jones (writing as D. F. Jones). This is the second volume in "The Colossus Trilogy" and a sequel to Jones' 1966 novel Colossus. The trilogy concludes in 1977's Colossus and the Crab.

== Plot ==
Five years has passed since the super computer called Colossus used its control over the world's nuclear weapons to take control of humanity. In our timeline, that would place this story in the 1990s or the early 2000s. All references in the novel, however, place it in the 22nd century, with the 20th and 21st being mentioned in the past. Colossus has been superseded by an even more advanced computer system built on the Isle of Wight, which has abolished war and poverty throughout the world. National competition and most sports have been replaced by the Sea War Game, where replicas of World War I dreadnoughts battle each other for viewing audiences. A group known as the Sect, which worships Colossus as a god, is growing in numbers and influence. Yet despite the seeming omnipresence of Colossus' secret police and the penalty of decapitation for anti-machine activities, a secret Fellowship exists that is dedicated to the computer's destruction.

Charles Forbin, in his early 50s in this and the first novel, is the former head of the design team that built and activated the original Colossus. He now lives on the Isle of Wight with his wife and son, serving the computer as Director of Staff. Though contemptuous of the growing cult of personality around Colossus, he has reconciled himself to Colossus' rule. His wife Cleo, now 28 years old (35 in the previous novel), loathes Colossus and is a member of the Fellowship. One afternoon while taking her son to a secluded beach, she receives a radio transmission from the planet Mars. Identifying Cleo as a member of the Fellowship, the transmission offers help to destroy Colossus and asks her to return to the same spot the next day for further instructions. She returns with Edward Blake, Colossus' Director of Input and the head of the Fellowship. Together, they receive instructions to obtain a circuit diagram of one of Colossus' input terminals and a sample of the information that is fed into it, along with instructions to proceed to two locations — one in St. John's, Newfoundland, the other in New York's Central Park — to receive further transmissions.

Though Blake passes the necessary information along to Cleo, she is quickly arrested by the Sect and sentenced by Colossus to spend three months at an "Emotional Study Center" on the island of Tahiti for one of Colossus' experiments designed to help Colossus better understand human emotion by (in this case) simulating the Roman myth of the Rape of the Sabine Women. Now under suspicion, Blake approaches Forbin, who is devastated by his wife's arrest. Explaining the details of their plot, Blake convinces Forbin to help after explaining the details of Cleo's captivity. Forbin travels in disguise with the requested information, first to St. John's, then to New York City, where he receives an incomprehensible mathematical problem that the transmission claims will destroy Colossus once it is fed into the computer.

Upon his return, Forbin slips the problem to Blake, who enters it into Colossus. While Forbin converses with the computer, Colossus begins to make verbal errors, then stops. Increasingly erratic, it attempts to warn Forbin of a threat from outer space that it was preparing to meet, but breaks down before it can complete the message. Now free of Colossus' rule, Blake moves to seize power, using the automated fleets of the Sea War Games to threaten the world's capitals. As Blake gloats, Forbin tells him of Colossus' warning. Requesting any reports of unusual astronomical activity, they learn that two contacts have been detected leaving Martian orbit and are now heading toward the Earth. The novel ends with the two men hearing a radio transmission repeating "Forbin, we are coming. Do not restart Colossus."

== Characters ==
- Professor Charles Forbin — The Director of Staff for Colossus and his chief human representative, in his early fifties.
- Doctor Cleopatra "Cleo" June Markham Forbin — Forbin's wife, twenty-eight years old. A former member of the Colossus design team, she is now a leader of the Fellowship seeking to destroy the computer.
- Doctor Edward Blake — Another former member of the design team, he is the Director of Input for Colossus and the leader of the Fellowship.
- Angela — Forbin's secretary.
- Galin — Formerly known as Alex Grey, he was an administrator who was one of the founding members of the Sect.
- Colossus — Central defense computer of the United States of North America and now the world.
- Guardian of Democratic Socialism, a.k.a. Guardian — Central defense computer of the Soviet Union, now integrated with Colossus.

== Continuity problems ==
- Doctor Cleopatra "Cleo" June Markham Forbin has lost seven years of age between books, even though The Fall of Colossus is supposed to be five years after Colossus. No accounting of her reverse aging is given.
- Colossus is set in the 20th century, Chapter 10 narrows that to the 1990s; however, numerous references in The Fall of Colossus set it in the 22nd century, while it is supposed to take place five years after Colossus. No accounting for this time difference is given.
- The Soviet defense computer is called "Guardian of the Socialist Soviet Republics" in Colossus, then "Guardian of Democratic Socialism" in The Fall of Colossus, with no explanation.

== Editions ==
- 1974, U.S. (hardcover), Putnam (ISBN 0-399-11282-0)
- 1975, U.S. (paperback), Berkley Books (ISBN 0-425-02760-0)
- 1977, U.S. (paperback), Berkley Books (ISBN 0-425-03738-X)

== See also ==
- Colossus
- Colossus and the Crab
- List of fictional computers
