= Earthfall (novel) =

1995 novel by Orson Scott Card

- Author: Orson Scott Card
- Cover artist: Keith Parkinson
- Language: English
- Series: Homecoming Saga
- Genre: Science fiction
- Publisher: Tor Books
- Publication date: 1995
- Publication place: United States
- Media type: Print (Hardcover & Paperback)
- Pages: 350
- ISBN: 0-312-93039-9
- OCLC: 31606501
- Dewey Decimal: 813/.54 20
- LC Class: PS3553.A655 E48 1995
- Preceded by: The Ships of Earth
- Followed by: Earthborn

Earthfall (1995) is a science fiction novel by American writer Orson Scott Card. It is the fourth book of the Homecoming Saga, a fictionalization of the first few hundred years recorded in the Book of Mormon.

== Plot summary ==
The children of Wetchik are ready to board the starship Basilica and embark on their journey from the planet Harmony back to the origin of humanity: Earth. However, the rivalry between Nafai and Elemak promises the journey will be anything but peaceful. Each faction already has hidden plans to prematurely awaken from the long hibernation, to have the upper hand when the landing occurs. The children become pawns in their parents' power struggle - valuable potential adults that can strengthen each faction. But the Oversoul is ultimately in control, having uploaded a copy of itself into Basilica's central computer, so that it can monitor the ship at all times.

After landing on Earth, the fragile peace wrought on board is merely a mask for the turmoils of passions that boil beneath. Not only do the colonists have to deal with the split, there are also the mysteriously symbiotic alien races that have evolved on Earth since humanity's departure. The quest to understand the Angels (giant bats) and the Diggers (giant rats) that were foreshadowed in the dreams is not an easy one.

The focus throughout the course of this novel begins to drift away from the original generation of characters in order to delineate the passage of time. The factions that developed among the original generation have now spread to their children, through no fault of the children themselves. Nafai finds himself and his "Nafari" living and working primarily amongst the angel people, whereas the "Elemaki" associate much more closely with the diggers. It is this dissociation that eventually breaks nearly all the bonds—literally, for Hushidh and Cheveya—between Nafai and his older brother, Elemak. As Elemak's rage and hatred for Nafai grow, he ingrains such feelings into his family and the digger people, laying the foundation for war.

After the death of Volemak the Nafari migrate northwards away from the landing site to found a new nation.

== Reception ==
A 1994 Kirkus review wrote, "Card's series would be more reader-friendly with fewer characters, and if the individual entries were more self-contained. Nevertheless, it continues to impress."

== See also ==
- List of works by Orson Scott Card
- Orson Scott Card
