= The Memory of Earth =

1992 novel by Orson Scott Card

- Author: Orson Scott Card
- Cover artist: Keith Parkinson
- Language: English
- Series: Homecoming Saga
- Genre: Science fiction
- Publisher: Tor Books
- Publication date: 1992
- Publication place: United States
- Media type: Print (Hardcover & Paperback) Audiobook
- Pages: 294
- Awards: Locus Award: Best SF Novel 9th Place
- ISBN: 0-312-93036-4
- OCLC: 24669212
- Followed by: The Call of Earth

The Memory of Earth (1992) is a science fiction novel by American writer Orson Scott Card. It is the first book of the Homecoming Saga, a loose fictionalization of the first half of the first book (1 Nephi) in the Book of Mormon.

== Inspiration ==
As a lifelong member of The Church of Jesus Christ of Latter-day Saints, Card has been influenced by his membership in the church in many of his works including Enders Game and The Tales of Alvin Maker. He was especially influenced by the Book of Mormon in his creative endeavors. Speaking of specific influences in his writing. "It shows up in my style. Anybody who wonders why practically every sentence begins with "and," "then," "but"—you just have to think of the phrase "And it came to pass," and you will understand where that comes from. You see, if a sentence is important and true, I instinctively feel that it must begin with a conjunction." As a young writer he was drawn to tell stories from the Book of Mormon in his own works. The Memory of Earth is directly inspired by the Book of Mormon in its plot, themes and message.

== Plot summary ==
Humanity has lived for 40 million years on a planet called Harmony, after leaving an Earth that has been destroyed by human conflict. In order not to repeat the mistakes that led to the destruction of civilization on Earth, a computer, known as the Oversoul, was left as guardian of this planet.

Its main mission was to prevent humans from developing technologies that could make wars a global affair. For that, humans were genetically modified so they could communicate with the Oversoul. The Oversoul uses this connection to make humans quite easily distracted when thinking about forbidden technologies, leading them to forget that train of thought. However, after this long time the Oversoul is beginning to fail, and it chooses a group of humans to return to Earth in search of the Keeper of Earth, in the hopes it will be able to find a way to maintain power over the people on Harmony.

To this end the Oversoul recruits Volemak, father of the protagonist of the story, Nafai. Nafai and Issib, his brother, begin to try and defy the Oversoul's capability to override thought. Through this they learn of the danger that it is in. Nafai begins hearing the Oversoul's voice in his mind. The first book focuses on the family's eventual betrayal, the taking of the Index, and the downfall of the man Gaballufix, who had been planning to ally the city of Basilica, the home of the main characters and the setting of the first half of the book, with a malignant nation.

Nafai, Elemak and Mebbekew, his older half brothers, Issib and his father Volemak are eventually forced to leave the city. They come back to retrieve the Index of the Oversoul, which allows them to communicate with it directly. Because of Nafai's careless blunders and miraculous successes, Elemak, Nafai's oldest brother, begins to hate him, a theme that will play out throughout the rest of the saga.

== Characters ==
The characters listed here are those whose primary role is in The Memory of Earth. For other characters, see Homecoming Saga or individual books.

Nafai
Youngest son of Wetchik Volemak and Rasa by second contract, brother to Elemak, Mebbekew, and Issib. Nafai is a tall, 18-year-old-boy (14 in "temple years") who clearly hears the voice of the Oversoul in his mind. Nafai and his brothers and father are banished from Basilica and are forced into the desert from a cunning plot conceived by Gaballufix. Volemak urges his four sons to go back to Basilica and retrieve the Index (a tool or index used to retrieve information from the Oversoul). Later Nafai confronts Gaballufix and cuts off his head under the bidding of the Oversoul.

Wetchik (Volemak)
The father of Nafai, Elemak, Issib and Mebbekew, he is a seller of exotic plants. He is given a vision from the Oversoul and told to leave Basilica with his family. He is a strong leader, able to see what must be done for the benefit of his family and he has the strength to go through with his plans.

Gaballufix
Elemak's oldest (half) brother, son of Hosni by Zdedhnoi, and father of Sevet and Kokor by Rasa. He attempts to ally Basilica with Potokgavan against the Gorayni (also known as the Wetheads). More importantly, he tries to draw the city into a war that goes beyond the Oversoul's (failing) mental blocks, and destroy its traditional female-dominated structure with the help of holographically-disguised soldiers that roam the streets. He sets up a plot to kill Volemak, who opposes him; after Volemak and his sons retreat to the desert, they realize that they need the Index, which is in Gaballufix's possession. He is eventually killed by Nafai, who will agonize over this choice and never really forgive himself for it.

Rasa
Nafai and Issib's mother Rasa is one of the most respected women in all of Basilica. She runs a school out of her own house where she teaches the brightest students in the city. She used to be married to Gaballufix, but is now exclusively married to Wetchik. She is ready to do everything in her power to defend her children including the students who see her as a mother figure.

Rashgallivak
Steward to the Wetchik fortune. After Volemak embarks on a series of seemingly ill-advised actions, Rashgallavik takes control of the money. Though his intentions (to protect the Wetchik's funds, as per his job) are originally good, he is overwhelmed by his own power after first becoming the Wetchik himself and then taking over Gaballufix's position. His tenuous hold over Gaballufix's guards is broken by Hushidh.

Roptat
One of the three most influential men in Basilica, along with Volemak and Gaballufix. Gaballufix plots to have Roptat and Volemak killed, and frame Nafai for the crime.

Elemak
The eldest child of Volemak the Wetchik by Hosni. Half brother to Gaballufix. He is driven by power and control, he acts as a personal antagonist to Nafai most of the time. He is not responsive to the voice of the Oversoul.

== See also ==
- List of works by Orson Scott Card
