= Nineteen Ninety-Four =

British radio series

Nineteen Ninety-Four is a BBC Radio 4 comedy series and a book written by William Osborne and Richard Turner. The six-part radio series was first broadcast in March 1985, and the book published in 1986. The title is a reference to the dystopian novel Nineteen Eighty-Four by George Orwell, which this series parodies.

BBC Radio 4 Extra rebroadcast Nineteen Ninety-Four between 17 August and 21 September 2011.

== Cast ==
- Robert Lindsay as Edward Wilson
- Paul Shearer as Charles
- Siobhan Redmond as Sophie
- Stephen Fry
- Hugh Laurie
- Emma Thompson
- David Goodland
- Pam Ferris
- Richard Turner
- Mark Knox

=== Episodes ===
No.	Title	Original release date
1	"Work is Freedom"	23 March 1985
Edward Wilson is hired by the Ministry of the Environment and gets embroiled in mysterious government machinations.
2	"Freedom is Choice"	30 March 1985
Sub-Officer Edward probes a mysterious incident in Cumbria and ends up leading a revolution.
3	"Choice is Progress"	6 April 1985
After an eventful night with Sophie, Edward can't find his office but finds his job title changing with alarming alacrity.
4	"Progress is Power"	13 April 1985
Edward's knack for blunt honesty gets him noticed in a bad way.
5	"Power is Happiness"	20 April 1985
Edward could be up for promotion - but will it go to his head?
6	"Happiness is Work"	27 April 1985
Edward is now in charge of the Environment - but for how long?

== Nineteen Ninety-Eight ==
A sequel series of six episodes entitled Nineteen Ninety-Eight broadcast in 1987 continued the plot line. It was published as a book in 1988 and rebroadcast on BBC Radio 4 Extra from 8 February to 14 March 2012.

=== Cast ===
- David Threlfall as Edward Wilson
- Mike Myers
- Stephen Fry
- Hugh Laurie
- Pam Ferris
- Jenny Luckraft
- Steve Steen
- Rebecca Stevens
- Richard Turner

=== Episodes ===
No.	Original release date
1	28 March 1987
Can Edward keep his girlfriend and avoid explosions?
2	4 April 1987
Edward wakes up with urgent news, but who will listen?
3	11 April 1987
On the run, Edward meets the Leopard - will he survive?
4	18 April 1987
Edward's quest for truth becomes the Movement.
5	25 April 1987
Even Edward's allies find themselves absorbed by AmJap.
6	2 May 1987
Edward and Tabitha finally face their foe - Colonel Brad.
