= Homecoming Saga =

Novel series by Orson Scott Card

Book one in the Homecoming Saga

The Homecoming Saga is a science fiction series by Orson Scott Card. The series is patterned on the Book of Mormon. Some of the names also come from the Book of Mormon.

The series, containing five volumes, takes place forty million years in the future, with volumes 1-3 taking place on a fictional planet called Harmony. The main premise of the series is that a human diaspora occurred after Earth was rendered uninhabitable by human wars. Forty plus planets, including Harmony, are colonized by humans (though only two are actually named in the series: Ramadan, settled by Arabs; and Harmony, apparently settled by Slavic cultures, as its languages all developed from Russian.)

On Harmony, the advancement of human technology is controlled by the Oversoul – an artificial intelligence monitor, using a small army of satellites, established by the original colonists to monitor the planet. It also influences the actions of humans. Though it does not prevent them from doing evil, it keeps their societal capability for destruction limited by suppressing any thoughts that might lead to things like long-distance travel or instant communication. Thus the technology on Harmony includes basic computers and solar-powered handheld energy weapons, but no cars or even wagons. The Oversoul, however, was only designed to last twenty million years, so eventually it begins to break down. It decides to send an expedition back to Earth to seek advice from the entity of which it is an imitation: the mysterious Keeper of Earth. Soon after, the people begin to receive dreams similar to those that the Oversoul sends that come directly from the Keeper of Earth via faster-than-light transmission.

As loosely inspired by the themes of the Book of Mormon, the first three books in the series deal with the main characters travails in journeying the site of the ships via a slow trek across Harmony. The fourth book, Earthfall, concerns itself with the journey of one of the ships back to Earth and the culture clash that results upon its homecoming, specifically, establishing a settlement and reconciling human culture with the existing creatures that have risen on Earth in the intervening millennia. The final volume, Earthborn, takes place five centuries further in the future; the one remaining member of the original expedition seeks to alter the path of the changing culture and see the Oversoul's mission finally fulfilled.

== Books in the series ==
- The Memory of Earth (1992)
- The Call of Earth (1992)
- The Ships of Earth (1994)
- Earthfall (1995)
- Earthborn (1995)

== Characters ==
The characters listed here are those who go on the expedition to Earth; they play major roles throughout the series. For characters whose significance is primarily in one book, see that book's page.

The Oversoul
Artificial intelligence that records all events on Harmony, worshipped as a goddess by the women and a god by the men. It is able to influence the actions of the people, who were genetically altered to be able to receive its directions. When the Oversoul realized that it was in danger of decaying completely without having completed its purpose, it began influencing certain humans to breed so that their descendants would have greater and greater ability to hear the Oversoul. In The Memory of Earth it begins directly instructing these people to engineer a return to Earth, in the hope of receiving instructions from the Keeper of Earth, on which the Oversoul was modeled. The Oversoul is a parallel to God in the Book of Mormon.

Nafai
Fourteen at the start of the series, he is chosen by the Oversoul to lead the expedition to Earth, in part because of his extraordinary connection to it. He is clever and well-intentioned, but is young, and has difficulty knowing when to stop talking. As the series progresses, Nafai matures and grows into his role. He is the second son of both Volemak and Rasa. He marries Luet, and their first child is Chveya. He inherits the cloak of the starmaster, which enhances his connection to the Oversoul and performs such useful functions as healing injuries. His name is a reference to Nephi, the author and namesake of the first books of the Book of Mormon.

Luet
Thirteen at the start of the series, she is known in Basilica as the Waterseer because her connection to the Oversoul enables her to have and interpret prophetic dreams. She is consistently more mature than Nafai, tempering his impulsive and occasionally headstrong personality with patience and good counsel. Nevertheless, she needs him as much as he needs her.

Issib
Nafai's older brother, crippled by trauma in the womb. In Basilica and in the vicinity of the ships he can move with the aid of "floats", which move his limbs in response to simple muscle contractions, but outside of these areas he is confined to a high-tech chair. It is his studies that lead him to realize that the Oversoul is blocking things from the thoughts of humans on Harmony; after he and Nafai begin defying the Oversoul, it begins to work with them. He marries Hushidh, and becomes one of the best at dealing with the Index. Issib is patterned on Sam from the Book of Mormon.

Hushidh
Luet's older sister, she is a raveler: able to see the relationships between people manifested as threads in her vision. This gives her remarkable insight into what people are thinking, as well as the ability to know what well-chosen words will break weak threads. Unfortunately, she is not so adept at seeing the larger effects of her (un)raveling. Though she at first sees her marriage to Issib as a convenient pairing of the unmarried males and females on the trip, they fall in love.

Elemak
Nafai's oldest brother. An accomplished tradesman with an aptitude for learning languages, he is nevertheless too power-hungry and violent to be chosen by the Oversoul. He never forgives Nafai for this. Although he has no wish to kill the rest of the company, he never lets go of the idea of killing Nafai. As his plots grow more complex, so do Nafai's defenses, thanks to the Oversoul and the community around him. Elemak is patterned on Laman from the Book of Mormon.

Mebbekew
Nafai's second oldest brother. An unabashed hedonist and would-be actor, his most recent seduction at the start of the expedition is Rasa's niece Dol, a former child actor. They get married, but Mebbekew is eventually unfaithful. He also sides with his older brother Elemak against Nafai, though he is considerably less clever than either. Mebbekew is patterned on Lemuel from the Book of Mormon.

Rasa
Nafai's mother. In Basilica she runs a school with enormous prestige, and five of her "nieces" (prize students adopted into roles of permanent sponsorship) embark on the expedition to Earth. After failing to renew her marriage with Volemak, she is married to Gaballufix for a while, but eventually goes back to Volemak and renews him consistently until the expedition. Though the oldest woman in the company, she bears three more children in the course of the journey, the oldest being Oykib. Rasa is patterned on Sariah from the Book of Mormon.

Volemak
Nafai's father. On Harmony his title is the Wetchik, and he is a wealthy trader. His faith in the Oversoul and its plans is unshakeable. Though it leads him to seemingly irrational actions early on, they are justified by the time the group sets out on his journey. Eventually it is only Volemak's authority that keeps Nafai's supporters and Elemak's supporters from outright conflict. Volemak is patterned on Lehi from the Book of Mormon.

Shedemei
A brilliant geneticist, and one of Rasa's nieces, she joins the expedition not because of any strong connections to the party but because she has the equipment and the expertise to manage the flora and fauna on the possibly ravaged Earth. She and Zdorab are the last unpaired couple, and she resents the idea of marrying him until she gets to know him, at which point they become among the closest pairs in the company. She was the Oversoul's second choice to don the cloak of the starmaster if Nafai refused it. After they build a community on Earth, Nafai eventually does give her the cloak, at which point she returns to the orbiting spaceship to watch over the planet like a garden. She spends much of her time in suspended animation, with the Oversoul her only company on waking. Five hundred years later, known on the planet as The One Who Was Never Buried, she returns to start a school and avert a political tragedy.

Zdorab
A servant, picked up apparently by accident on retrieving the Index. The only gay character in the novels, he is a wallflower, keeping quietly out of the way and handling menial tasks so fluidly that the others begin to take it for granted that they are his job. On the other hand, he is the most adept at navigating the Index, using back doors to avoid loops and blocks in the Oversoul's programming. Shedemei is disdainful of him until she confronts him about their inevitable marriage and learns that his uncomplaining servitude is a survival mechanism for being homosexual on a fairly bigoted planet. Shedemei revises her opinion of Zdorab, and the two become very close. When Shedemei retreats to the ship, Zdorab goes with her; without the cloak of the starmaster, he dies before she does, but (thanks to suspended animation) long after the rest of the company. Zdorab is patterned on Zoram from the Book of Mormon.

Eiadh
One of Rasa's beautiful nieces. Nafai is in love with her at age fourteen, but she is attracted to power and marries Elemak. As the two struggle for dominance, she wavers between the two. By this time Nafai is married to, and in love with, Luet; he never considers adultery. To her credit, Eiadh eventually sides with Nafai against her murderous husband, and has matured enough that she does not make advances on him.

Sevet
Rasa's older daughter by Gaballufix. A fine singer in Basilica, she cheats on her husband regularly - first with Obring, later with Elemak and Mebbekew. Her husband, Vas, is deceptively accepting; unlike Elemak, his plotting is not obvious, but he is cold and calculating and never forgets a grudge.

Kokor
Rasa's younger daughter by Gaballufix. Violently jealous of her sister Sevet. When she discovers Sevet in bed with her husband, the mean-spirited but weak-willed Obring, she lashes out, striking Sevet in the throat and destroying her singing ability. The two are always attempting to dramatically one-up each other, and are never truly reconciled.

== Items ==
Pulse
A rifle-like light based weapon. The range is about 1/4 the range of a good Gorayni bow. A pulse has multiple settings for beam strength and area. The different settings vary from one used for cooking meat to one able to blast a man to pieces at point blank range. Despite its lethality, the pulse is designed nearly exclusively for hunting animals. At several points, characters express their shock at the prospect of using it as a deadly weapon. It is battery powered and the battery can be recharged by exposure to sunlight. Since its battery decays with use, unused pulses should be hidden away in a dark place. Once a battery is dead, the weapon becomes useless and is discarded. Pulses can be manufactured, but the knowledge to repair them is beyond humans.

== See also ==
- List of works by Orson Scott Card
