= D. F. Jones =

British science fiction writer (1918–1981)

Dennis Feltham Jones OBE VRD (15 July 1918 – 1 April 1981) was a British science fiction author who published under the name D.F. Jones. He was a Royal Navy commander during World War II and lived in Cornwall.

His first novel, Colossus (1966), about a defence super computer which uses its control over nuclear weapons to subjugate mankind, was made into the feature film Colossus: The Forbin Project (1970).

== Bibliography ==
=== Novels ===
- Colossus series:
  1. Colossus (1966)
  2. The Fall of Colossus (1974)
  3. Colossus and the Crab (1977)
- Implosion (1967)
- Don't Pick the Flowers, or Denver is Missing (1971)
- The Floating Zombie (1975)
- Xeno, or Earth Has Been Found (1979)
- Bound in Time (1981)

=== Short stories ===
- "Coffee Break" (1968)
- "Black Snowstorm" (1969)
- "The Tocsin" (1970)

== Film Adaptation ==
- Colossus: The Forbin Project (1970), directed by Joseph Sargent, based on his 1966 novel Colossus

== See also ==
- Colossus computer
