= Sword of the Spirits =

The Sword of the Spirits is a trilogy of young adult novels by English writer Sam Youd under his pseudonym John Christopher. The stories are set in the South of England, mostly in Hampshire, in a post-apocalyptic future where, due to a worldwide ecological catastrophe, life has reverted to a militaristic, medieval setting of walled cities and perpetual warfare. Christians are a despised minority, as spiritual matters are in the hands of a priestly class of monastic "Seers" who interpret the will of the "Spirits". There are signs of the past existence of the modern world in the ruins of great cities and "high roads" which dot the harsh landscape, but the Seers have made the technology of the "ancients" anathema, and anyone dabbling in "Science" is immediately put to death.

The catastrophe has also resulted in a greatly increased number of birth defects. People with dwarfism constitute a separate caste to "true" men and fulfill the mythical role of forging weaponry, along with other metal work. People called "polymufs", who have other disfiguring mutations, are the lowest caste, as menial workers and wage slaves, regardless of whether they are actually physically or mentally disabled.

== The Prince in Waiting ==
The Prince in Waiting was published 19 October 1970.

The cover of the first volume.

In the novel, 13-year-old Luke is the son of a captain, one of the semi-hereditary caste of officers of the army of his home city of Winchester. Luke has had an uneventful childhood and looks forward to his fifteenth year, when he will begin training for his own military career. By a twist of fate he becomes the toast of the city when he leads his team to victory in the annual mock combat tournament. A series of machinations by religious and political leaders results in his father becoming the new Prince of Winchester, and in Luke being named as his successor and future "Prince of Princes". Luke is, on the whole, pleased with his new position and takes pleasure in the nobleman's pastimes of hunting, falconry, riding, and military drill. Luke also takes pride in his father's success in leading the city to a number of victories on the battlefield. But before Luke reaches the age of seventeen his mother is murdered, his father is treacherously killed, and his elder half-brother Peter has engineered his own succession as the new Prince. Luke, realising that his position as a dispossessed heir is precarious, escapes the city for the Sanctuary of the High Seers, where he learns their surprising secrets.

== Beyond the Burning Lands ==
Beyond the Burning Lands was published 1 September 1971.

The cover of the second volume.

In the novel, Luke leaves the Seers' sacred sanctuary near Stonehenge to return to Winchester as an honoured member of his brother's royal court. Luke is satisfied for the time being to serve as his brother's second in command and confidant. However, his desire for adventure sends him on an expedition to the uncharted territory beyond the Burning Lands, an active volcanic region to the north. After a perilous journey, the expedition reaches the country of the Wilsh, a wealthy and civilised people who are ruled by the wise and generous King Cymru from his royal seat in the beautiful open city of Klan Gothlen. Luke is astonished to see that several of the prejudices of the southern lands are not in sway here: technology is openly used and discussed; Christians, though a minority, are accepted in society; and polymufs are not relegated to a lower caste: the Wilsh king has a polymuf as his chief adviser. Luke is acclaimed a hero in this new land when he kills the Bayemot, a kind of giant amoeba which comes from the sea and wreaks havoc on the land. After he recovers from the injuries suffered in the fight with the monster, Luke accepts the offer of a formal betrothal to the daughter of King Cymru. He then returns to Winchester, only to stand charged with the murder of his brother's wife and unborn child. He is sentenced to be crucified and burned alive. He challenges his brother to a sword duel to clear his name, though Peter, mistakenly assuming Luke wishes to die by the sword and escape the torturous execution, says he will merely wound Luke and Luke will still face the painful death. However, Peter is stricken with anger and grief, and despite his superior skill and strength, accidentally runs himself on Luke's sword during the ensuing fight (though Luke later wonders if Peter did it on purpose because he wished to die), and Luke finds himself the new Prince.

== The Sword of the Spirits ==
The cover of the third volume.

The Sword of the Spirits was published 1 April 1972.

In the novel, Luke, readily assuming the role of military leader, extends his rule to Petersfield and Romsey and appears to be on his way to fulfilling the Spirits' command to unify the cities of the civilised lands. Then, from beyond the Burning Lands the Wilsh princess Blodwen comes to Winchester to consummate the alliance. However, Luke is much less at ease in the boudoir than on the battlefield: Blodwen falls in love with Luke's friend and principal military advisor, Edmund. When Luke attempts to exile Edmund to save face and the alliance, an insurrection ensues. The city's military commanders are divided between those supporting Edmund and those loyal to Luke. At a peace meeting, the city's senior Captain, who had presented himself as a friendly mediator, turns on Luke and proposes that Princely rule be replaced by a council of commanding officers, in which all are equal. Deposed, a furious Luke is forced to flee beyond the Burning Lands, where Blodwen's royal father lives, and raise an army to take back what is rightfully his. King Cymru grimly aids him, considering Blodwen's betrayal an affront to his honour. While wintering at the Seers' sanctuary, Luke's loyal dwarf retainer, Hans, discovers how to make a weapon which will make Luke's army unbeatable: the Sten gun. Luke leads the Wilsh army to Winchester, but after a great slaughter and horrific siege, he fails to breach the walls of the city. The Seers, who still hope to see the warring cities of the south united under one leader, arrive with field artillery, but as he prepares for the final assault on his native city, Luke realises that he cannot bear the human costs which a victory would entail. He forswears Winchester and returns north to live as Cymru's adopted heir to the Wilsh kingdom. The trilogy ends on a hopeful note as the Seers, now called scientists, openly introduce technology to the more tolerant Wilsh people, who dedicate themselves to peacefully rebuilding modern civilisation.

== Themes ==
One of the enduring consequences of the natural catastrophe which toppled the old order is global cooling, a theme also addressed by Youd in the adult novel The World in Winter.

Like the heroes of Youd's other post-apocalyptic novels (including the more famous The Tripods), Luke is an example of a flawed protagonist. Luke's flaws include a copious helping of pride and stubbornness. He interacts awkwardly with women, and is highly intolerant of any dissent or other departure from absolute loyalty, and it transforms him into a near-tyrant by the climax of the series.
