= Peter Symonds College =

Sixth form college in Winchester, Hampshire, England

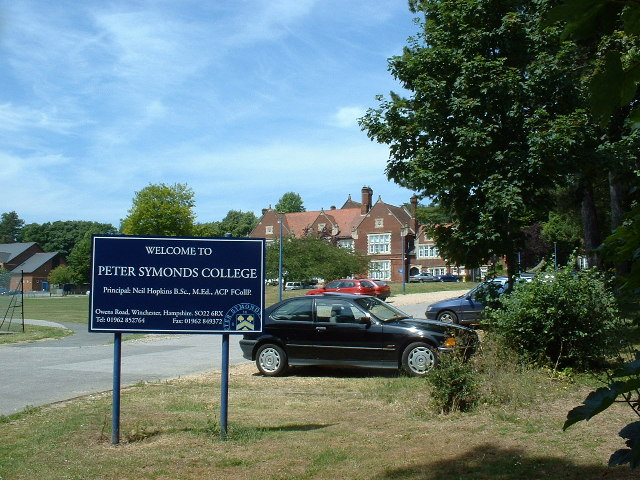

Location
- Owens Road; Winchester, Hampshire, SO22 6RX; England; 51.0701°N 1.3201°W

Information
- Type: Sixth form college Day & boarding
- Motto: Counting in Ones
- Established: 1607, re-established 1897
- Local authority: Hampshire County Council
- Department for Education URN: 130708 Tables
- Ofsted: Reports
- Principal: Sara Russell
- Staff: Approx. 200 teaching staff & 150 non-teaching staff
- Gender: Coeducational
- Age: 16 to 18
- Enrolment: c.5000
- Colours: Navy blue and yellow
- Former pupils: Old Symondians
- Affiliations: Worshipful Company of Mercers
- Website: http://www.psc.ac.uk

Peter Symonds College is a sixth form college in Winchester, Hampshire, England. The college is the largest sixth form in England.

Peter Symonds College traces its origins to Christes Hospitall, a charitable institution established through the will of Peter Symonds, a prosperous Tudor merchant. In 1896 the charity established the College as a grammar school for boys.

Peter Symonds serves as the official sixth-form college of the Falkland Islands, housing a boarding house named Falkland Lodge. It is one of the very few sixth form colleges which also serve as a boarding school.

== History ==
=== Life of Peter Symonds ===
Peter Symonds was born in Winchester in 1528, the son of the city's bailiff John Symonds and his wife Joan, during the reign of King Henry VIII. Peter was sent to London in 1542, where he served as an apprentice to William Wilkinson, a London sheriff and alderman. Following the death of William Wilkinson in 1543, Peter continued in the service of his widow, Joan. Joan had served as a silkwoman in Anne Boleyn's household, and was close friends with leading Protestant reformers, most notably the Oxford Martyrs: Archbishop of Canterbury Thomas Cranmer, Nicholas Ridley, and Hugh Latimer.

When the reformers were imprisoned for their beliefs during the early years of the reign of Queen Mary I, Joan Wilkinson acted as their advocate and supplied them with necessities. Archbishop Cranmer advised her to leave England and promote Protestantism from the safety of the continent. After Bishops Ridley and Latimer were executed, Joan became a religious exile in Frankfurt, where she died in December 1556 at the house of her cousin, Cuthbert Warcop, a London mercer, and his wife, Anne. Her place of burial is unknown. Joan Wilkinson's will opens with a declaration that she was in "voluntarie exile for the true religion of Christ", and among her bequests were £6 13s. 4d. left to Peter Symonds who was still living in London.

Symonds became a successful mercer, and was one of the three wardens of the Worshipful Company of Mercers in 1583. He married Anne Symonds by 1576 and moved to the parish of All Hallows, Lombard Street, at about this time. In 1582, he was among the richest of the city, and one of the two richest men in his parish. J. N. Hare attributes this wealth to the cloth trade that "dominated London's exports".

By his death, sometime between 24 April 1586 and 29 July 1587, he had accumulated a large amount of land in the South East of England. In his will, he left land and property in Chadwell and West Ham in Essex, and a farm at East Shalford in Surrey, to his wife. Then following her death, he directed that a group of trustees, including his brother William, Mr. Bilson as warden of the New College at Winchester, and four others, should secure a licence and an act of parliament for an almshouse to be constructed at Winchester named Christes Hospital. In addition, he left annual payments for a number of charitable purposes, including the poor of All Saint, Lombard Street and Chadwell in Essex.

It was this almshouse that was to become Peter Symonds College; however, legal struggles over Symonds' land delayed construction. Richard Symonds, who claimed to be Peter's sole heir, occupied the property at Ingleby in Chadwell and Temple Marsh in West Ham before selling them, breaking the terms of Peter's will. By 1600, after reportedly paying £280, the Winchester city corporation secured the land. It is unknown when exactly the almshouse was constructed, though it was in progress in 1604, and has been accepted to be complete by 1607. King James I gave royal consent for the hospital in 1615, thus giving the hospital legal status.

=== Early years as a grammar school ===
In 1896 permission was obtained from the Charity Commissioners to establish a grammar school for boys. The school was opened in 1897 with 59 boys in temporary accommodation in 39 Southgate Street. Mr Telford Varley, who had been second master at the Royal Grammar School in Guildford became the school’s Headmaster. By the end of 1899 the permanent school buildings were opened at the present site.

In 1906 approval was obtained from the Board of Education and the County’s Director of Education to build a house for the Headmaster.

In 1913 the amalgamation was organised with Trafalgar House School. This was a school based in Trafalgar Street, just below Westgate. It had been run for 100 years by the Naish family. The number of pupils at Peter Symonds before the amalgamation was about 150 and 35 boys joined from Trafalgar House.

After World War I the library was built as a memorial to pupils and Old Symondians who had died in the war. Within only two years the number of pupils had risen from 200 to 250. Telford Varley retired as headmaster in 1926. He was replaced by Dr. Percy Tom Freeman, who had worked at King Edward VI School, Southampton, as head of Science.

=== Later years as a state school ===
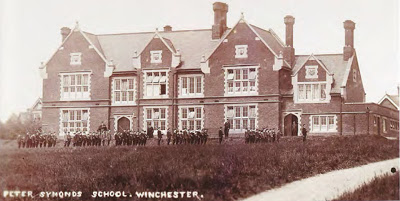
CCF training in front of Northbrook building, Peter Symonds c. 1944

The School continued to grow under Dr Freeman as headmaster until after World War II when the state education system was established and Peter Symonds became a voluntary controlled school. This resulted in the abolition of fees and free textbooks were provided. Dr Freeman was due to retire in 1957 but died in harness in August 1956. The school now had 650 pupils and needed extra accommodation. Dr Freeman was replaced by John Shields who was headmaster from 1957 to 1963. The school received funds to expand and provide more accommodation to meet the needs of the school.

The late 1960s saw the rise of comprehensive education. The Hampshire County Council reorganised education in the county rapidly whilst other counties dragged their feet to maintain their grammar schools. It was decided to make Peter Symonds a sixth form college during this time and other schools in the Winchester area would be feeders providing education for the years 11 to 16. John Ashurst left in 1971 to be replaced by Stuart Nicholls who had the task of overseeing the change in the status of the school to sixth form college. The school became a college in 1974 and the last grammar school intake left in 1979. In the early 1990s Neil Hopkins replaced Stuart Nicholls as Principal of the college.

In 1991 the Trustees of the Alms Houses, Christ’s Hospital, arranged for the remaining portion of Peter Symonds’ Foundation to be amalgamated with the Winchester Charity, known as St. John’s Hospital and Allied Charities.

In the late 1990s or early 2000s, for reasons unknown (but possibly because of the difficulty students and correspondents had in spelling the college's name correctly), the College dropped the possessive apostrophe from its founder's name in its official title, and is now known as Peter Symonds College.

== College life ==
=== Admissions ===
The college has 5000 students aged 16–19, mainly from Hampshire and Wiltshire, but also British Forces teenagers from Germany and Cyprus, and residents of the Falkland Islands. Most students spend two years at the college (referred to as Lower and Upper 6th), but candidates who do not meet the entry requirements may be offered an initial Level 2 year to complete the required qualifications to attain a place the next year. The college has a separate site at Stoney Lane in Winchester where it provides courses for some 2000 adult students.

=== Curriculum ===
Most students at Peter Symonds take three A-levels, with some taking other vocational courses. However, some students take four or more A-levels in their first year and continue with either three or four A-levels in their second year. The Level 3 Extended Project Qualification (EPQ) is offered at the college.

Amongst the subjects on offer at the college are Fine Art, Photography, Three-Dimensional Design, Textiles, Biology, Business, Chemistry, Classical Civilisations, Computer Science, Criminology, Dance, Drama, Economics, English Language, English Literature, Environmental Studies, Film Studies, French, German, Geography, Politics, Graphics, Health & Social Care, History, ICT, Law, Italian, Mathematics, Further Mathematics, Media Studies, Music, Philosophy, PE, Physics, Product Design, Psychology, Religious Studies, Sociology, Spanish and Statistics. The college is one of the few sixth form colleges offering Latin at both AS and A-level.

Courses are available at AS-level, A-level, BTEC Level 2 National Certificate, BTEC Level 3 National Certificate and GCSE at the college.

=== Extra-curricular activities ===
All students at Peter Symonds must take at least one mandatory extra-curricular activity, known as an Enrichment, for which they are timetabled each week. Some are run by college staff, others are student-led and students are prompted at the end of each academic year for suggestions of Enrichment activities they would like to run or participate in. There are over 200 enrichment activities available, including: qualifications like the Duke of Edinburgh's Award; cultural societies like the African-Caribbean Society and Gender Sexuality Alliance; musical ensembles like the college's orchestra, jazz band and Kelso Choir (named after the former music building); media and arts groups like the Symonds Radio station and Company of Fools student-led theatre company; both recreational and competitive sports; and subject-specific study groups or extended work groups.

=== Boarding ===
Approximately eighty students board at the school circa 2005. Students board at the two houses; School House and Falkland Lodge. Boarders are typically from British Armed Forces families or the Falkland Islands. The Falkland Islands Government funded the construction of the Falkland Lodge, and pays for each student to board at Peter Symonds if they achieve at least five "C" grades in their GCSEs. Therefore, in 2005 principal Neil Hopkins described the institution as "the official sixth-form college for the Falkland Islands". There were more boarding houses when the college was a boys' grammar school: Wyke Lodge - which was originally converted into the Environmental Studies block, before being demolished to make way for the Russell Music Centre - and Kelso - the former home of the Music department, now housing administration & office space.

=== Sports ===
The college has teams in the following sports: athletics, badminton, basketball, cheerleading, cricket, dance, football, futsal, hockey, netball, rugby, skiing, squash, swimming, table tennis, tennis, and volleyball. Additionally there are recreational sport activities (requiring no prior experience or trials) in badminton, basketball, dodgeball, football (both 11-a-side and womens'-only), hockey, indoor cricket, lacrosse, netball, squash, table tennis and volleyball.

=== Students' Union ===
The Peter Symonds College Student Union works in conjunction with Student Services to promote student interests alongside organising events for the student body, such as diversity festivals, guest speakers, charity events, concerts and end of year balls. The SU consists of the Executive Committee (President, Vice President, Treasurer, Secretary) and other officers (Canteens and Environment, Entertainments and Charity, Communications, Equality and Diversity, Officer without Portfolio and others). The Students' Union has a history of organising and coordinating protests and demonstrations on behalf of the student body.

The President of the SU also serves on the Board of Governors as a student governor, along with one other student governor who need not be a member of the Executive Committee. Amongst the roles of the President are to chair the executive committee, and to organise and chair the Student Parliament.

The Students' Union officers are elected by students in all year groups at the end of the academic year. Participation in the elections is through the use of an online system accessible through the student intranet; this system was introduced for the first time in the executive committee election of April 2012. The electoral system works on a "single transferable vote" system, with a "re-open nominations" option available. All candidates must publish a manifesto ahead of time, and most will campaign both in person and on social media.

The Student Union is affiliated with the National Union of Students. The college is entitled to send two voting delegates to the Union Conference.

== Overview ==
=== Academic achievement ===
In 2009 Peter Symonds was placed sixth in The Times top 50 state sixth forms. In the same year the college was ranked 85th in the country (only including institutions with at least 30 exam entrants) based on Average Points Score.

In 2011 the college was placed 4th of the top 50 state sixth forms in the country.

A2 Results 2015

	Entries	A*	A	B	C	D	E	U	X	A*-B	A*-C	A*-E
Summary	5169	622	1194	1464	1058	541	243	46	0	3281	4339	5123
Percentage		12.0	23.1	28.3	20.5	10.5	4.7	0.9	0.0	63.5	83.9	99.1

AS Results 2015

Summary	Entries	A	B	C	D	E	U	X	A-B	A-C	A-E
Summary	7132	1873	1579	1512	1039	652	473	4	3452	4964	6655
Percentage		26.3	22.1	21.2	14.6	9.1	6.6	0.1	48.4	69.6	93.3

2015 results showed the pass rate remained at 99% and students performed better than last year, with 83% achieving A*-C at A-Level.

=== Buildings ===
In 2004, the John Shields Building was unveiled, providing classrooms for the computing, psychology and environmental science departments. Also in that year, the Varley Café was rebuilt, now known as PW2.

The £4.2M Ashurst Learning Resources Centre was completed in the spring of 2007. Ashurst contains five computer suites, housing over 170 computers (three suites double as classrooms, but remain open access when not in use), a library and silent study areas.

The Conlan building was completed in the summer of 2014, this building is used for a variety of subjects including Photography and Business. It includes a green screen which is used by photography and media students.

The Hopkins Building, named after previous principal Neil Hopkins, was previously known as the Ashurst Quad. It sits alongside the Ashurst Learning Resource Centre (LRC) which was opened in September 2015, creating more study space for students. The ground floor of the building is dedicated to the provision of computers and student workspaces, whilst the top floor is occupied by the Geography and Latin departments.

On 21 April 2023, the Carville building was opened which was named after previous principal Stephen Carville. The two-storey building includes 12 classrooms and houses the Business and Economics departments.

The college unveiled the Russell Music Centre on 20 June 2025, in a ceremony hosted by former student Will Champion and principal Sara Russell (after whom the building was named). The product of a £5.4 million grant, it features two industry-standard recording studios, seven sound-proofed rehearsal rooms, a recital room with a full PA & lighting rig, and multiple acoustically treated classrooms for use across the college's four music courses.

=== Headmasters and principals ===
- Revd Telford Varley III, 1897 to 1926
- Dr Percy Tom Freeman, 1926 to 1956
- Charles Simpson (acting), 1956 to 1957
- John Shields, 1957 to 1963
- John Ashurst, 1963 to 1972
- John Cooksey, 1972 to 1973
- Stuart Nicholls, 1973 to 1993
- Neil Hopkins, 1993 to 2013
- Stephen Carville, 2013 to 2018
- Sara Russell, 2018–

=== Notable Old Symondians ===
- Ben Ainslie—British sailor and four-time (00',04',08',12') Olympic gold medalist, five-time Olympic medalist (4G,1S) – most decorated sailor of all-time. Britain's flag-bearer for London 2012 Closing ceremony.
- Michael William George Lucas, 2nd Baron Lucas of Chilworth British Conservative Peer.
- Kevin Ashman—professional quiz player.
- Gina Beck—actress, singer, currently playing Miss Honey in the West End production of Matilda the Musical.
- Mike Brown, —Harlequins and England rugby player. 2014 Six Nations Player of the Tournament.
- Jon Boden Folk singer and former lead singer and main arranger for Bellowhead.
- Andy Burrows—drummer in the band Razorlight, and formerly We Are Scientists.
- Laura Carmichael—British actress, best known for playing Lady Edith Crawley in popular TV series Downton Abbey
- Benjamin Cawston Professional Racquets Player. Current World number 1 (May 2022) and two times US Open Champion
- Will Champion—drummer in the band Coldplay.
- Alexa Chung—TV presenter, model and fashion designer.
- Julia Copus Poet and children's writer.
- Jack Dee—Stand up comedian and actor.
- Mark Easton ^{__} the Home Editor for BBC news broadcasting on national television and radio news since 2004, also a published author noted for his book titled Britain (2012)
- William Easton artist and writer
- Edward Eveleigh—High Court judge
- Philippa Forrester – Television presenter.
- Bernard Harrison (1934-2006) - Footballer/Cricketer
- Ben Hart (magician)^{__} Magician and Britain's got Talent finalist.
- Tom Hayes (trader) - Former trader who was arrested, tried, sentenced to 14 years in prison for role in the Libor Scandal
- Nigel Healey—Vice Chancellor, Fiji National University
- Air Chief Marshal Sir Patrick "Paddy" Bardon Hine GCB, GBE—Senior Royal Air Force commander. Commander of all British forces during the first Gulf War.
- Dermot Hudson – Chairman of United Kingdom Korean Friendship Association
- Phil Hughes—cricketer
- Jing Lusi—British actress
- Joe Marchant ^{__} rugby player.
- Caroline Nokes—Conservative MP since 2010 for Romsey and Southampton North
- Christian O'Connell—Radio presenter on The Christian O'Connell Breakfast Show on Absolute Radio
- Chance Perdomo – British actor, known for Killed by My Debt (2018), the Chilling Adventures of Sabrina and Gen V.
- Iain Percy —British sailor and double Olympic champion.
- Lucy Pinder—glamour/nude model and Celebrity Big Brother housemate
- Rozi Plain —Singer-songwriter and member of This Is The Kit
- James Buckley Thorp ^{__} Founder of fashion corporation Rupert and Buckley
- Sam Youd ^{__} a British writer, best known for science fiction under the pseudonym John Christopher, including the novel The Death of Grass.

== See also ==
- Education in the Falkland Islands
