= James Quinn (director) =

American film and television director

- Other names: James J. Quinn; Jim Quinn
- Occupations: Film director, television director
- Years active: 1997–2004

James Quinn is an American film and television director.

In the film industry, he has only worked as an assistant director on the films Smokey and the Bandit (1977), The Last Waltz (1978), Rich and Famous (1981), Gremlins (1984) and other films.

In 1984, he became an assistant director on the television series Miami Vice, he made his head directorial debut on that series, directing three episodes in 1987. Some of his other television directing credits include Crime Story, Midnight Caller, The Client, Early Edition, Law & Order and Law & Order: Special Victims Unit. His last directing credited was a 2004 episode of The Division.

== Filmography ==
- The Division (2004; 1 episode)
- Law & Order (2001 - 2003; 11 episodes)
- Providence (2003; 3 episodes)
- Law & Order: Special Victims Unit (2001; 2 episodes) (TV Series) (2 episodes)
- Deadline (2000 - 2001; 2 episodes)
- Secret Agent Man (2000; 1 episode)
- Early Edition (1997 - 2000; 6 episodes)
- Dellaventura (1998; 1 episode)
- Players (1997; 1 episode)
- EZ Streets (1997; 1 episode)
- Mr. & Mrs. Smith (1996; 1 episode)
- The Client (1995; 2 episodes)
- New York News (1995; 1 episode)
- Courthouse (1995; 1 episode)
- The Monroes (1995; 1 episode)
- The Marshal (1995; 1 episode)
- Viper (1994; 1 episode)
- Mann & Machine (1992; 2 episodes)
- Blind Man's Bluff (1991)
- Reasonable Doubts (1991; 2 episodes)
- Midnight Caller (1989-1991; 8 episodes)
- DEA (1990; 1 episode)
- Freddy's Nightmares (1989; 1 episode)
- Wild Jack (1989)
- CBS Summer Playhouse (1988; 1 episode)
- The Bronx Zoo (1988; 1 episode)
- Private Eye (1988; 1 episode)
- Crime Story (1987; 2 episodes)
- Miami Vice (1987; 3 episodes)
