= Die Wächter =

- Directed by: Franz Peter Wirth
- Country of origin: Germany

Original release
- Network: ARD
- Release: February 1986 – March 1986

Die Wächter is a German television series.

The 1970 dystopian novel The Guardians (German title: Die Wächter) is a piece of work by the English author John Christopher. He portrays the fate of Rob Randalls, a boy living in a two-class society.

The novel was awarded the German youth literature prize in 1976.

In 1985, Die Wächter was made into a television series of six episodes with a runtime of 45 minutes per episode. The producing company was the Bavaria Atelier GmbH. The character Rob Randalls was played by Martin Tempest. The television series aired on the German television channel ARD from February until March 1986.

== Plot summary ==
England of the 21st century is divided into two regions. One is the frantic and advanced Konurba, the other is the region in which humans live under pre-WWI conditions. The people of the two regions do not know each other because a fence marks the border of both sides. That is why both sides' population is suspicious of each other. Rob Randall, a boy from Konurba, lives together with father ever since his mother died. After his father died in an accident, the boy is sent to a public boarding school. But because of dominantly brutal customs Rob runs away from the boarding school. He decides flee to the region his mother grew up in. After arriving there Rob meets the son of country aristocrats, Mike Gifford who agrees to hide Rob in a cave. When Mike's mother finds the Rob she decides after initial hesitation to offer Rob to live with the family as an allegedly "nephew from Nepal". The boy is fast to settle into the life of country aristocrats and attends school together with Mike starting in September. There they get to know Daniel Penfold, an upperclassman who criticises social order. Whilst Mike is starting to develop an interest in Penfold's ideas, Rob confronts these ideas sceptically.

== Literature ==
- Die Wächter by John Christopher, published by Ravensburger Verlag, ISBN 978-3-473-58027-9.

== See also ==
- List of German television series
