= The Long Winter =

The Long Winter may refer to:

- The Long Winter (novel), a Laura Ingalls Wilder novel
- The Long Winters, an American indie rock band
- The World in Winter alternate title The Long Winter, a novel by John Christopher
- The Long Winter (1992 film), a Spanish film
- The Long Winter (1999 film) or Quand je serai parti... vous vivrez encore, a Quebec historical drama film
- The Long Winter, an event in the Shire of J. R. R. Tolkien's fiction, The Lord of the Rings
