= Wild Jack =

1974 novel by John Christopher

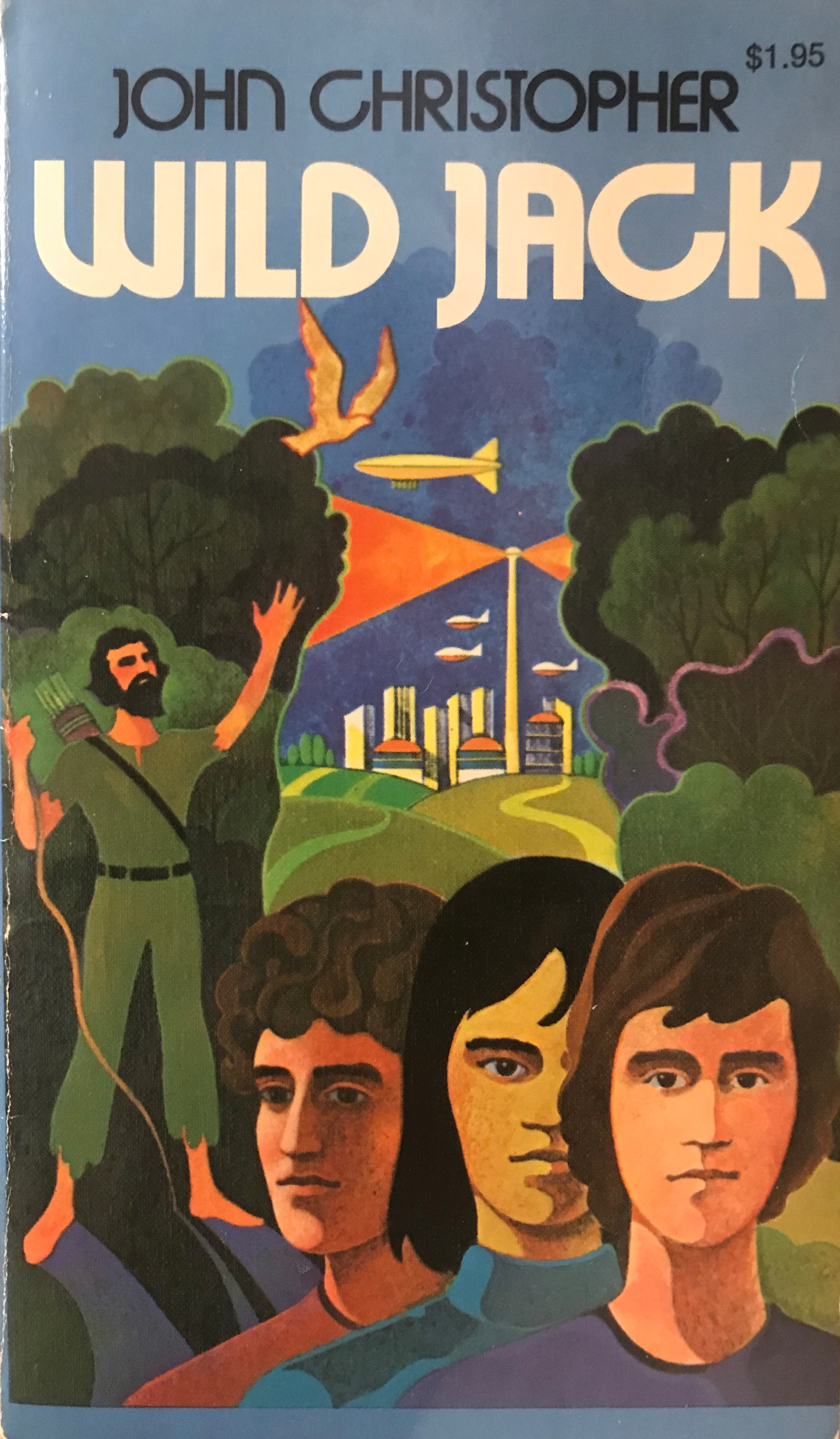
- First edition
- Author: John Christopher
- Language: English
- Genre: Science Fiction
- Published: September 1, 1974
- Publisher: Macmillan
- Publication place: England
- ISBN: 0020424108

Wild Jack is a 1974 young adult science fiction novel written by the English prize-winning author John Christopher. Set in twenty-third century England, the plot concerns the young aristocrat Clive Anderson, who lives in decadent isolation within one of many walled-in hierarchal city-states, whose walls keep out the dangerous wilderness of the Outlands, and the barbaric savages known to hide there. When Clive is falsely accused of questioning the status quo, he is sent off to a brutal prison island. Faced with hunger and cruelty, he begins to truly question the good of his world.

== Plot ==
Clive Anderson lives an idyllic life in the city-state of twenty-third century London. He is a child of privilege, the son of a powerful councilman, spoiled with manservants and private boats. His distant cousins the Sherrins are visiting, the golden-haired girl Miranda being of particular interest to Clive—he considers naming his boat after her. Clive is accustomed to luxury; his is a world of pleasure gardens and holiday islands, of nuclear-powered airships and "energy towers" powering the lights of the city. "Old London," along with the rest of the world, was all but destroyed during some cataclysmic event referred to as the "Breakdown," which annihilated much of the world's population, so much that the current population of London only numbers in the thousands. There are other people outside of the cities, within the "Outlands," but they are known to be savages and barbarians who hurl rocks at cars passing through the wilderness. Clive does not think about such things much, however.

While attending a party along the river, Clive overhears a schoolmate, Brian, questioning the role of their society's servants, asking "What right do we have to make them serve us?" It's explained that they are the descendants of people who became servile in exchange for entry into the paradisal cities and escape from the Outlands. Clive agrees with the other boys at the party that's it's absurd to question such things. That it is his ancestors who helped to build the world up again after the people of old ruined it. When Brian persists, arguing that London and the other cities of the world could hold ten times as much people as they do, they tell him he ought to go into the Outlands and join "Wild Jack," the infamous "bogeyman who would creep up from the Outlands, steal over the wall by night, and take back naughty children to his lair among the savages." Clive enjoys the rest of the party and doesn't think any more on the topic.

The day after, Clive is pulled from his class by the police. At first, he is unworried—he has never had issue with the law, not when they surround his father constantly. However, when he is intently questioned about what happened at the party, he comes to understand he is being accused of speaking Brian's treacheries. Clive has the opportunity to place the blame on Brian but decides against it, recognizing at last the seriousness of the situation. With his high-ranking father on holiday in the Mediterranean, Clive is unable to defend himself. He is taken upon an airship and from there is taken to a prison island for boys which have similarly disrupted the status quo.

The conditions differ significantly from the comforts Clive is accustomed to, involving sleeping on the ground in a tent with twenty other boys, poor food, labor, and the threat of the stockade. The island functions as a "training school" intended to correct the "corruption" that placed the boys against the will of society and led them to "put self before citizenship." Their "redemption" is pursued through deprivation, work, and obedience, and they are only allowed back to their old lives once deemed proper citizens. The gray-suited guards are harsh, though Clive is initially unconcerned, believing his father will resolve the situation upon returning from vacation. He informs the island's commandant of his father's high-ranking position in an attempt to gain special privileges.

While on the island, Clive meets two others boys, Kelly and Sunyo, whom he quickly comes to rely upon as friends and confidants. The two other boys are well aware they've done more to “deserve” being sent to the island than Clive, and are unlikely to leave for a long, long time. When Sunyo discovers an old dinghy buried in the sand of the beach and expresses interest in using it to escape the island, at first Clive thinks it's crazy—the island is hard, but he's been given special treatment because of his father, and he's sure that he won't remain there much longer. However, soon Sunyo gets into trouble for striking a guard and is placed into the stockade. Days pass, his condition worsening, and with the guards uncaring Clive and Kelly fear Sunyo might die should he not be rescued. They know there'll be no use in springing him from the stockade should he still remain on the island after—and so the three make use of the boat to drift off into uncertain territories. Clive joins the two at the last moment, unsure even himself why.

They realize quickly the true madness of their scheme. They've left with no provisions and only a small idea of perhaps trying for the coast of France. The weather deteriorates; hunger, thirst and tiredness set in. The mast snaps and almost overturns the dinghy, forcing the boys to bail to stay afloat. Their hopes are brought high and dashed low when they spot an approaching airship which passes by without seeing them. After days of hardship, they at last reach a coast—only to find themselves stranded now in the Outlands. Clive and the other boys are terrified that they will be discovered by savages and horribly murdered, or eaten alive by wild beats, but they've no choice other than to trek into the forest in search of civilization. Clive misses breakfast in bed and his TV. He believes them to have washed ashore somewhere along the wilds of England, and thinks they might have a chance to make it to Southampton, where the Sherrins reside.

After a good bit of trekking, the boys discover a glimpse of civilization—a vegetable patch in the midst of the forest. They quickly partake of the tomatoes, only to realize they've been discovered by the horrible “savages.” They are brought to the club-wielding men's village and are kept confined in one of their primitive wooden huts for a while before their hands are tied and they are made to march again through the woods, eventually being brought before a fresh band of "men in green", residing deep in the wild. Clive has had a hard time understanding the people of the Outlands, recognizing that they are speaking English but in a coarser way he is unused to. As such, he is surprised to find here a tall bearded man with a “city accent,” who asks Clive to explain who they are. The bearded man is unsympathetic to Clive's recent troubles, for running away because “life was hard.” And he introduces himself as the infamous Wild Jack.

Made prisoners yet again, under Wild Jack's men now, Clive, Sunyo and Kelly look to perform another escape, but are unable even to get out from the log-walled hut they spend their night in. The green-clothed men treat them all with derision, calling them “city boys.” In the morning Wild Jack makes fun of their efforts and brings them out to take part in “the ordeal.” Clive fears what's to come as they are brought back into the forest, then to a ravine with a flimsy rope ladder slung across it. Wild Jack poses that it's a “little test,” to cross the bridge to the other side. Wild Jack explains that this place is called “Taipan Canyon,” for the deadly snakes which inhabit it—descendants of zoo animals escaped during the Breakdown. At knifepoint, another man is made to go first, and falls. Very quickly he collapses, clutching at his ankle. One by one the boys go next—Kelly first, then Sunyo, until it is Clive's turn. They all make it across; laughing, Wild Jack congratulates them, and from the bottom of the canyon the “dead man” stands as well; there were never any snakes within the ravine.

Wild Jack explains that it was a true test—to see whether the boys were suited at all towards life in the Outlands. They will not hold the boys any longer, if they do not want to stay; men “are all free in the Outlands.” Clive and the others partake in something of a feast back at camp in honor of their success, and afterwards talk with Jack as he feeds his homing pigeons. Wild Jack disapproves of the word “savages,” saying that it's only people everywhere—but that the people of the Outlands, at least, are free. He uses Kelly and Sunyo's imprisonment on the island as examples, and gets Clive to admit that the cities’ servants are not free either, and that the energy towers of the cities could be used to provide for far more people than they do. Wild Jack also reveals that most of the people making up his “merry band” are not true denizens of the Outlands, but rather men from the cities who had good reasons to leave. For the first time, Clive recognizes that there might be some things wrong with the world he's come from—but still he clings to the idea that the people of the cities have a right to protect what they have from those that might try to take it.

For a while, the boys all join in the lives of the men in green. They are taught aspects of archery, learn to catch fish and ride on horseback. It is not all unpleasant, Clive finds. He swims in the stream and finds happiness in eating fish he has caught himself. When the time comes for them to decide whether they’d like to stay, Kelly and Sunyo both decide to remain—Clive, however, asks to be brought back.

The next day they bring Clive out through the woods to the highway. He does have second thoughts, understanding he is going to miss parts of the short life he's had in the Outlands, but is determined to stick to the decision he's made. He says his goodbye to his friends—the ones from the island, and the ones which he'd made among Wild Jack's band—and the man himself bids Clive well in his city life. Wild Jack gifts Clive one of his homing pigeons, as a reminder of everything, and after Clive walks up to the walls of Southampton. There he is taken in by his cousins the Sherrins, and while regaling them with the story of his travels he explains how the savages are not so bad as the cities make them out to be. Clive's come to think that there's no reason for the world to be so divided as it is. Back in the comfort of his cousins’ mansion, however, something is wrong—soon Clive comes to find the truth behind his imprisonment. Mr. Sherrin sought, through deception, to involve Clive with a subversive group and have him imprisoned so that his father would be forced to undertake rash action to save his only son. Clive is caught listening in and finds himself yet again locked away—he looks out towards the Outlands and thinks himself foolish, for walking right back into imprisonment when he'd at last, for the first time, experienced true freedom with Wild Jack and his band. Determined to do something, at least, he releases the pigeon gifted to him by the outlaw.

Brought again into interrogation by the police, this time the questions are about Wild Jack and his outlaws—all of which Clive refuses to answer, until eventually it is over and he is brought to a cell where he can see the forest. He falls asleep, and wakes to Wild Jack's voice—out the cell window there are horsemen in the street. They toss Clive a rope and he escapes through the window. The men in green are fighting with the policemen, bows and arrows against their guns. It seems impossible, but they are winning, and they ride out from the wall back into the Outlands. The outlaw felt there might be trouble, when the pigeon returned. They were able to win through smarts, breaking into the city alongside the scheduled police car, and through skill—Wild Jack claims “at close quarters a bow is a match for any gun.”

And they succeeded because the city men were fearful, and Wild Jack and his men were brave. “A brave man has half won his fight before he starts, even against heavy odds. But the heavier the odds, the braver he has got to be.”

Clive is saddened at the thought that he may never again see his parents, but at least now his father is safe from Mr. Sherrin's deceptions. Riding with Wild Jack, he returns to the forest, to Kelly and Sunyo, as Wild Jack proclaims they might “make an outlaw of him” yet.

== Characters ==
Clive Anderson - The son of one of the city's leading councilmen. Prior to his accusation, Clive is fully settled in his role, enjoying the luxuries of walled-in London. He has a privileged life, and sees nothing wrong with the machinations of his world. His imprisonment on the prison island allows him to start grasping that his comfortable life had hidden costs, and he is left to decide whether he is now willing to pay them.

Kelly - An American. A fellow "inmate" of Clive's at the off-shore prison island, who shares his tent and his escape plans. He was sent to the island for turning a teacher's own cane upon the man.

Sunyo - Another boy interred at the prison island, sent all the way from Kyoto. Sunyo is the one to find the boat buried on the beach, which the boys dig out to provide escape from the island. He was taken to the island after organizing something of a “guerilla” group against the authorities as vengeance for the death of his father, which culminated in a raid on the police building itself.

Wild Jack - The titular futuristic "Robin Hood," bogeyman of the Outlands who runs an outlaw band in opposition to the whims of the city-states. Clive and the other boys become captured by his men shortly after their escape from the prison island to the mainland wilderness, and after they “prove” themselves to him he helps to show Clive the meaning of “freedom” and why his idyllic city life was bereft of it.

Miranda Sherrin - A distant “cousin” of Clive's, whom he's somewhat enamored with—he is attracted to her “golden” hair and strange smile. Her own father was once a political rival of Clive's councilman father. She and her family live in Southampton, although at the opening of the novel she is visiting Clive's family in London.

Mr. Sherrin - A cousin of Clive's own father, whose political career all but fell apart following a fierce rivalry with the man. He plots to have Clive taken to the prison island as a means of politically "destroying" Clive's father, in retribution for his exile years ago.

== Themes ==
Throughout his various novels, Christopher makes frequent use of "themes of global catastrophe." Wild Jack is no different, featuring a world rebuilt in the shadow of the apocalyptic "Breakdown." Interestingly, the dichotomy of the city versus the wild is a topic which Christopher had explored before, in his award-winning novel The Guardians; however, in that book it was a dichotomy "where the ruling class live in country villas, and the cities are festering." The foremost idea of the novel Wild Jack appears to be freedom, a message which Christopher has explored before; perhaps his most well-known series, The Tripods, also features rebel fighters going up against a force of vast technological superiority and strength. As Christopher told an interviewer in 1984, "Freedom of thought is perhaps the greatest good, and needs to be fought for and sacrificed for." This theme can also be treated as "resistance to tyranny", paralleling many resistance movements against such tyrannies as in Nazi Germany and Communist Russia, and Communist China.

== Reception ==
Kirkus Reviews commented "once again John Christopher has created a world with a clean, simplistic dichotomy."
