= The Ragged Edge =

The Ragged Edge may refer to:

- The Ragged Edge (film), a 1923 film
- "The Ragged Edge" (Babylon 5), an episode of the TV series Babylon 5
- Ragged Edge, or The Rag, a disabled-rights magazine
- A Wrinkle in the Skin, a 1965 novel also known as The Ragged Edge
