= Youds =

Youds is an English surname originally from the Wirral peninsula, historically part of Cheshire.

The name must not be confused with the similar-sounding Youd surname.

The earliest record dates from 1434 and in 1588 the name appears in Bebington, Wirral.

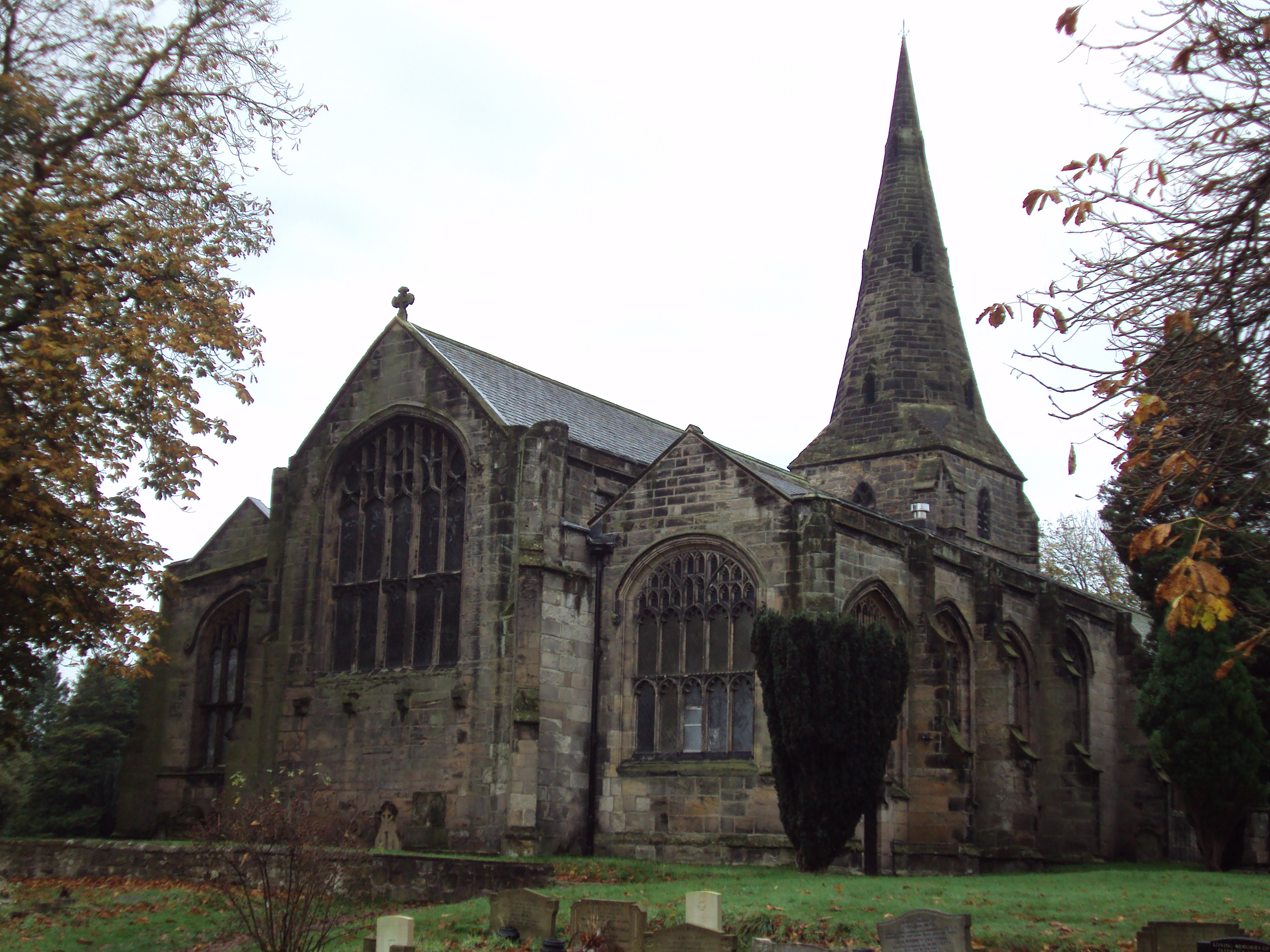
Bebington, St. Andrews

== Origin of the name ==
Currently little is known about the meaning or origin of this unusual and rare surname, it is not listed in any books of British surnames. Viking roots are a likely possibility as the Wirral peninsula was colonised by Norwegian Vikings from 902 AD onwards.

== Early records ==
The first recorded spelling of the family name is shown to be John Euddes in 1434, an English soldier stationed in Vire garrison in Normandy. He is listed as a man-at-arms on a muster roll from the Hundred Years' War with France.

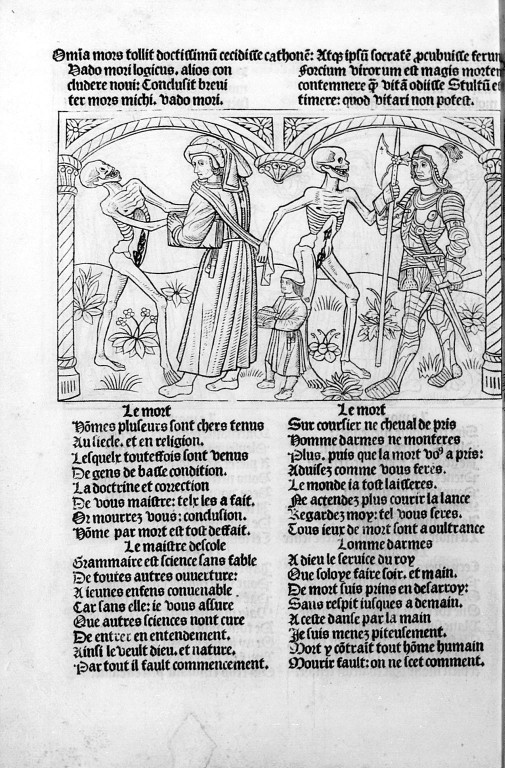
Danse Macabre - Schoolmaster and Man-at-arms, 1486

The surname next appears in 1588 recording the marriage of Richardus Yoldes & Margareta Collye in St Andrew's Church, Bebington.

Church records there start in 1558.

For the next 180 years the Youds name is only found on the Wirral, in villages such as Bidston, Greasby, Hoose, West Kirby etc. Around 1770 the name starts to appear also in Liverpool.

Many variants of the surname were recorded in the 16th and 17th century, including Yewds, Yewdes, Yuedes, Yeuds, Yeudes, Yowds, Yauds, Eudes, Euddes, Eaudes, Ewds, Ewdes, Ewdds, Youlds, Yoldes, Hewds, and others.

Today only the variant Youds is still in use.

== Distribution of the name ==
According to the Office for National Statistics some 445 people named Youds lived in England & Wales in 2002.

The Youds surname has spread to other parts of the British Isles and through emigration also to USA, Canada, Australia and Brazil.

Key emigrants of interest to family historians are:

- John Youds (born bef 1804): before 1824 to Bahia, Brazil
- Thomas Youds (born 1855, Rainford): before 1880 to Australia
- Charles John Youds (born 1875, Chorlton): 1929 to British Columbia
- William Henry Youds (born 1881, Toxteth): 1907 to Vancouver
- James Arthur Youds (born 1881, West Derby): 1912 to British Columbia
- Henry Youds (born 1886, Bootle): 1894 to New York
- Wilfred Nielsen Youds (born 1891, Kirkdale): 1894 to New York
- Cyril Keith Wynne Youds (born 1924, Liverpool): bef 1954 to California

== People with the surname Youds ==
- George Youds (1872-1937), early English football player
- Jack Youds (1878-1939), English golf professional, golf club maker
- Robert Youds (1954-), Canadian sculptor
- Eddie Youds (1970-), English football player, retired
- Katie Youds Smith (1988-), English author and vegetarian activist
- Ben Youds (1988-), American ice hockey player
