= Fireball (novel) =

1981 novel by John Christopher

- First UK edition
- Author: John Christopher
- Language: English
- Series: Fireball
- Genre: Alternative history
- Publisher: Gollancz (UK); E. P. Dutton (US)
- Publication date: 1981
- Publication place: United Kingdom
- Pages: 148 pp
- ISBN: 0-575-02974-9
- Followed by: New Found Land

Fireball is the first book in a trilogy by John Christopher, published in 1981, exploring the adventures of two cousins when they are suddenly transported into an alternative history Earth through a mysterious fireball.

== Plot ==
In the year AD 1981, British boy Simon meets his visiting American cousin Brad, but they do not get along, Simon finding Brad to be conceited, but knowledgeable enough to justify his conceit.

The two boys are drawn towards a mysterious glowing ball, which instantly transports them to what appears to be more than a thousand years back in history. After some time they realise that they have travelled not to the past but to an alternative Earth also in the year 1981, but one with a different history - the Roman Empire under Flavius Claudius Julianus Augustus, aka Julian the Apostate or Julian the Philosopher, was successful in his AD 363 Persian Campaign. The victory led stability under Pax Romana, and in turn led to general stagnation of the civilised world, a subsequent absence of major technological development, as there was no motivation for change.

The boys are separated to be sold as slaves. Brad is able to make use of his knowledge of Latin to persuade a Roman Christian to purchase his freedom. It is revealed that as the Emperor Julian survived instead of dying on the Persian Campaign, Christianity never became the state religion. Christianity still survives, but only as a small minority sect. By evidence of his modern wrist-watch, Brad convinces the Bishop that the boys come from a different and more technologically advanced world. The opportunistic Brad offers to help the Pope raise an army to overthrow the Roman authorities, ostensibly to cease oppression of the Christians, but mainly, in return for power, status and wealth for the cousins to rise in the new realms. Simon goes along with the plan because he wants to free the slaves and promote equal status for non-Romans, and because he has fallen in love with a high-born girl.

Brad introduces to the Christian armed forces the stirrup and the longbow, which were never invented in that world. The Christian forces are victorious and the Bishop enters Rome riding on a donkey. However, Simon is quickly disillusioned when the new Church authorities begin forcing all people to convert to Christianity, or face death by the pendulum. Together with Bos, a gladiator, and the staunch pagan, Curtius, both formerly on the side of the rebellion, the boys sail off on a ship towards the New World.

== Later volumes ==
The novel was followed by two volumes in the trilogy, New Found Land (1983) and Dragon Dance (1986).
