= The Tripods (TV series) =

British-Australian sci-fi TV series (1984–1985)

- The Tripods Titles
- Genre: Science fiction
- Based on: The Tripods by John Christopher
- Written by: Alick Rowe (series 1); Christopher Penfold (series 2)
- Directed by: Graham Theakston (7 eps); Christopher Barry (11 eps); Bob Blagden (7 eps)
- Starring: John Shackley; Ceri Seel; Jim Baker
- Composer: Ken Freeman
- Countries of origin: United Kingdom; Australia
- Original languages: English, French, Italian, German
- No. of series: 2
- No. of episodes: 25

Production
- Producer: Richard Bates
- Running time: 25–30 minutes per episode

Original release
- Release: 15 September 1984 – 23 November 1985

The Tripods is a television adaptation of John Christopher's The Tripods series of novels. It was jointly produced by the BBC in the United Kingdom and the Seven Network in Australia. The music soundtrack was written by Ken Freeman.

Series one of The Tripods, broadcast in 1984, had 13 half-hour episodes written by Alick Rowe, the author of many radio plays, and covers the first book, The White Mountains; the 12-episode second series (1985) written by Christopher Penfold covers The City of Gold and Lead. Although a television script had been written for the third series, it was cancelled by BBC executives Michael Grade and Jonathan Powell due to the adaptation failing in the ratings.

The first series was released on both VHS and DVD. The BBC released Tripods — The Complete Series 1 & 2 on DVD in March 2009.

== Premise ==
Britain 2089. Since the invasion of the Tripods the country has been locked in a pre-industrial age. The Tripods tyranny on Earth has endured for decades, courtesy of the "Capping" process which most humans undergo on reaching adolescence. The caps are essentially metal plates which are fused into the wearer's head by the Tripods through which the Tripods can send instructions or orders.

The Capped are not 'possessed'. They can work as butchers, farmers, blacksmiths, carpenters, get married, etc as they might have done otherwise, but they are never truly independent entities. Once capped, no one is ever truly free.

Little wonder then that on being tipped off by a local resistance figure, Will Parker (John Shackley) has no intention of being Capped. He plans to escape, embarking on a long journey. In time, he is joined by his cousin Henry (Jim Baker) and a French lad, Jean-Paul Deliet (Ceri Seel) nicknamed "Beanpole".

== Production ==
The series introduced several minor changes from the book, notably the shape of the Masters and Tripods, which have tentacles (although the Tripods do have a mechanical claw-arm that they sometimes use) in the book; the Black Guard was introduced to serve as a tangible human antagonist as overuse of the Tripods themselves would be expensive to film and undermine their dramatic presence; gravity inside the Golden City was increased artificially, which is not mentioned in the TV series; the introduction of "cognoscs", spiritual life-forms vastly superior to the Masters themselves; and more other main characters, including love interests for both Will and Beanpole. The original texts have few female characters. John Christopher was asked about this for an interview on Wordcandy, replying that at the time of writing the series, it was generally accepted that girls would read books with boy main characters, but not vice versa. He also stated that he felt the addition of an entire family of girls to the TV series was somewhat "over the top". The series is also notable for featuring non-humanoid aliens, which was uncommon at the time.

Charlotte Long, who played Will's love interest Eloise, died in a car crash shortly after the start of transmission of the first series. For the second series, the role was briefly recast, with Cindy Shelley appearing as Eloise during a dream sequence.

The models of the Tripods used throughout the two series were built by Martin Bower from designs by Steve Drewett.

== Episode guide ==
Two series were produced between 1984 and 1985, adapting The White Mountains and The City of Gold and Lead. A third series, which would have covered The Pool of Fire, was scripted but never filmed.

=== Series 1 (1984) – The White Mountains ===
Episode	Title	Original air date	Synopsis
1	"A Village in England – July 2089 AD"	15 September 1984	Will Parker learns the truth about “capping” from the vagrant Ozymandias & escapes with his cousin Henry to seek the free men in the White Mountains.
2	"England – July 2089 AD"	22 September 1984	Pursued by agents of the Tripods, Will & Henry continue their flight toward the Channel coast.
3	"The English Channel – July 2089 AD"	29 September 1984	The boys reach France but are arrested, later escaping with help from sympathisers.
4	"France – July 2089 AD"	6 October 1984	Joined by Jean-Paul (“Beanpole”), they travel through the ruins of Paris & learn more about life under the Tripods. This episode aired the same day series regular Charlotte Long died.
5	"Château Ricordeau, France – July 2089 AD"	13 October 1984	Will is injured & taken in by a noble family, meeting Eloise & creating friction with Henry.
6	"Château Ricordeau, France – July 2089 AD (Part 2)"	20 October 1984	Will delays his journey to remain with Eloise while Henry & Beanpole move on.
7	"Château Ricordeau, France – August 2089 AD"	27 October 1984	Will discovers Eloise has been capped & resolves to rejoin his friends.
8	"Château Ricordeau, France – August 2089 AD (Part 2)"	3 November 1984	Will leaves the château; the group reforms & heads south.
9	"France – September 2089 AD"	10 November 1984	The travellers rest at a vineyard before resuming their arduous journey.
10	"France – September 2089 AD (Part 2)"	17 November 1984	Hardship, hunger & pursuit by Black Guards test their determination.
11	"France – October 2089 AD"	24 November 1984	The trio steal food during a village festival & are captured.
12	"France – October 2089 AD (Part 2)"	1 December 1984	They escape captivity & push on through the mountains.
13	"The White Mountains – November 2089 AD"	8 December 1984	The boys reach the stronghold of the free men, completing their journey.

=== Series 2 (1985) – The City of Gold and Lead ===
Episode	Title	Original air date	Synopsis
14	"The White Mountains – 2090 AD"	7 September 1985	In the mountain base, Will & Beanpole train for the annual Tripod Games that select slaves for the Masters’ city.
15	"Travel"	14 September 1985	The competitors journey across Europe to Germany for the Games, facing hazards en route.
16	"Will Is Arrested"	21 September 1985	Will is jailed after a fight; Beanpole disappears; Fritz becomes his uneasy ally.
17	"Help from Friends"	28 September 1985	With aid from Zerlina & Papagena, the fugitives reach the Games arena.
18	"City of Gold"	5 October 1985	Will & Fritz are taken as slaves into the Tripods’ City of Gold & Lead.
19	"Will Is Made a Slave"	12 October 1985	Will becomes servant to Master 468 & begins to learn about the alien hierarchy.
20	"Hunt for Eloise"	19 October 1985	Will searches for Eloise, now asleep in the City; Fritz uncovers disturbing truths about the Masters.
21	"The City of Gold (again)"	26 October 1985	The boys learn of the Masters’ plan to alter Earth’s climate for their own species.
22	"Blessings of the Cognosc"	2 November 1985	Will is interrogated by the Cognosc, leader of the Masters, who suspects human rebellion.
23	"The Cognosc Departs"	9 November 1985	Will kills his Master & escapes into the canals beneath the City.
24	"Escape from the City of Gold"	16 November 1985	Beanpole rescues Will; they flee through the countryside, hiding with a travelling circus.
25	"The Forest of Death"	23 November 1985	The pair plan to return to the mountains with news of the Masters’ intentions, but betrayal threatens them.

=== Unproduced third series ===
A third series, based on The Pool of Fire, was scripted but cancelled by the BBC before production commenced.

== Filming locations ==
The following is a list of fictional locations in the show, the series, the episode in which the location appeared, and the actual location (all in the UK except where shown):

Fictional location	Series	Episode	Actual location
Village of Wherton and mill pond	1	1	Friday Street
Parker Family mill	1	1	Friday Street
Village of Wherton and mill pond	1	1	Headley Mill, Hampshire
Vagrant Bridge	1	1	Gutte Pond Bridge, Wotton Estate, Wotton, Surrey
Tomb	1	1	Evelyn Mausoleum, Brickyard Lane, Wotton, Surrey
Rhymney	1	1-2	Charlestown Harbour, Charlestown, Cornwall
cave entrance	1	3	Charlestown Harbour, Charlestown, Cornwall
Airfield control tower	1	4	Radlett Field, Frogmore
Metro station entrance	1	4	Intersection of Cornhill and Threadneedle Street, London
The Chateau Ricordeau	1	5-8	Saltwood Castle, Hythe, Kent
Canal "chemin de fer"	1	8	Section of the Gloucester and Sharpness Canal, Gloucester
Tunnel (exterior shots)	1	9	Windsor Hill Tunnel, New tunnel, North portal, Downside
Tunnel (interior shots)	1	9	Highgate Tunnel, Holmesdale Road, Highgate, London
Vichot's Vineyard	1	9-10	Wootton Vineyard, North Wotton
Waterfall/creek crossing	1	11	Swallow Falls, Betws-y-Coed, Gwynedd, Wales
Viaduct	1	11-12	Pensford Viaduct, Pensford
French festival location	1	11	Haughmond Abbey ruins, Shropshire
French village archway	1	11	Portmeirion, Gwynedd, Wales
French village court house	1	11-12	Court room scenes were shot inside Town Hall in the Hercules room, Portmeirion, Gwynedd, Wales
Stone quarry building	1	12	floor six mill, Diffwys slate quarry, Blaenau Ffestiniog, Gwynedd, Wales
Stone hut	1	12	Diffwys slate quarry, Blaenau Ffestiniog, Gwynedd, Wales
Black pipeline/interrogation building	1	13	Lake llyn Cowlyd, Trefriw, Wales
Alpine chapel	2	1, 12	St-Jean, Switzerland
Boxing ring	2	1	Lake Ffynnon Llugwy, Wales
Freemen camp	2	1, 12	Lake Ffynnon Llugwy, Wales
Swiss capping site	2	1	Rue du Village, Grimentz, Switzerland
Ship graveyard	2	2	Purton Ship Graveyard, Purton, Berkeley
Basel docks (where the boys find the barge Erlkoenig)	2	2	Victoria Basin of Gloucester Docks, Gloucester
Württemberg docks (where the barge Erlkonig is moored)	2	2	Lydney docks and harbour, Lydney
The Pit	2	2	Town Hall Square, Unterseen, Switzerland
Bachara docks (Will and Beanpole meet Zerlina and Papagena)	2	3	Lake Thun Next to Oberhofen Castle, Oberhofen, Switzerland
Church clock tower	2	3	St Mauricius Church, Thun, Switzerland
Will and Beanpole are chased into alley by Black Guards after Will escapes from the pit	2	3	Alley off of Spielmatte Strasse, Unterseen, Switzerland
Will and Beanpole are chased by black guards after Will escapes from the pit	2	3	Oberhofen Castle, Oberhofen, Switzerland
Will and Beanpole miss the barge to the games	2	3	Lydney docks and Harbor on the River Severn, Lydney
Derelict house where girls scare boys	2	4, 11	Gwylfa Hiraethog, (former hunting lodge), Wales
Games stadium	2	4	Former site of White City Stadium at Trafford, Manchester
Gardens in City of Gold	2	6, 7	The Barbican conservatory, Barbican Centre, London
City of Gold interior shots	2	7-10	Dinorwig power station, Wales
Beanpole rescues Will from river	2	11	River Wye. The house is known as "The Gatehouse" and was formerly "the Boatman's Rest", Hole-in-the-Wall.
Market where Beanpole tries to sell chess pieces	2	11	City Hall Plaza, Thun, Switzerland

== Reception ==
The Daily Express hailed The Tripods as "the most compelling imaginative teatime adventure story in years", while Broadcast described it as "strongly acted and beautifully shot. The overall sense is one of menace and adventure. Tripods is quite simply one of the best half-hours of the week".

On BBC Two's Did You See...?, author Brian Aldiss said, "What I don't like about it is that it's a certain type of science fiction which is looking backwards instead of forwards". Likening it to an advert for Hovis bread, he labelled it "a rather clumsy piece of engineering".

In the book The Classic British Telefantasy Guide, Paul Cornell, Martin Day and Keith Topping wrote "The Tripods could have been one of the most impressive of all BBC Telefantasy productions but sadly, due to a mixture of lacklustre scripts, the inexperience of several of the young cast, some cheap special effects and a plodding snail's pace, it fell flat on its face. On a brighter note, the performances of John Shackley, Roderick Horn, John Woodvine and Pamela Salem were, at least, watchable."

== Video game ==
BBC Enterprises licensed a video game adaptation of the TV series in 1985. It was designed by Watermill Productions for the ZX Spectrum and published by Red Shift.

== Film adaptation ==
Disney has owned the film rights to The Tripods since 1997. It was reported in 2005 that a cinematic version was in pre-production with Australian-born director Gregor Jordan signed on to rewrite and direct for Walt Disney's Touchstone Pictures label. In 2009, Alex Proyas was hired to direct a feature film adaptation of The Tripods and Stuart Hazeldine would write the screenplay starting with The White Mountain without Murphy & Touchstone.

== DVD and soundtrack ==
A DVD release of the complete series 1 and 2 was released on 23 March 2009 (Region 2). A new soundtrack album, The Tripods: Pool of Fire Suite by original composer Ken Freeman inspired by the unmade third series of The Tripods was released at the same time. The theme tune bears a slight similarity to that of the long-running BBC medical drama Casualty, which Freeman also composed soon afterwards.

The Tripods: Pool of Fire Suite
No.	Title	Length
1.	"A Plan of Action"	3:46
2.	"The Green Man"	6:40
3.	"A Drink With Ruki"	7:32
4.	"The Pool of Fire"	6:31
5.	"Summers of Winds"	4:40
6.	"Freedom"	5:31
7.	"The Conference of Man"	5:33
Total length:		40:12
