= No Blade of Grass (film) =

1970 film by Cornel Wilde

- Theatrical release poster by Bill Gold
- Directed by: Cornel Wilde
- Screenplay by: Sean Forestal; Cornel Wilde (as Jefferson Pascal)
- Based on: The Death of Grass; 1956 novel by John Christopher
- Produced by: Cornel Wilde
- Starring: Nigel Davenport; Jean Wallace; Lynne Frederick; Anthony May
- Cinematography: H.A.R. Thomson
- Edited by: Frank Clarke
- Music by: Burnell Whibley
- Production company: Theodora Productions
- Distributed by: Metro-Goldwyn-Mayer
- Release date: October 23, 1970 (United States)
- Running time: 96 minutes
- Countries: United Kingdom; United States
- Language: English

No Blade of Grass is a 1970 apocalyptic dystopian film directed and produced by Cornel Wilde and starring Nigel Davenport, Jean Wallace, and John Hamill. It was adapted by Sean Forestal and Wilde (as Jefferson Pascal) from John Christopher's novel The Death of Grass (1956) and follows the survivors of a plague that has hit London in the not-too-distant future. When London is overwhelmed by food riots caused by a global famine, a man tries to lead his family to safety to a remote valley in Westmorland.

== Plot ==
The film opens with a montage of pollution, which is implied by the narrator to be the cause of a virulent new disease arising in Asia, a virus (referred to in the novel as the "Chung-Li virus") that strikes all members of the grass family, including wheat, rice, and maize. It spreads to Africa, Europe and South America, bringing starvation, anarchy and cannibalism in its wake. Hundreds of millions die. The Chinese use nerve gas on their own population, killing 300 million, in their desperate attempts to survive.

A year after the start of the disaster, John Custance, his family and his daughter Mary's boyfriend, scientist Roger Burnham, leave London during rioting just before roadblocks are set up. They head for his brother David's farm in the north.

They stop at Mr. Sturdevant's shop to obtain firearms. When Sturdevant refuses to sell them any without the proper permits, John and Roger overpower him, but are held at gunpoint by his assistant, Andrew Pirrie. However, when John explains the situation to Pirrie, he shoots his employer, and he and his wife Clara join them.

To get past an Army roadblock, they are forced to shoot three soldiers. Later, the party become separated when Roger and Pirrie race each other in their cars. John's car is stopped by a gate at a train crossing. He is knocked out, and his wife and 16-year-old daughter are taken away and raped by three men. John and the others find them and shoot two of the men, but one gets away.

Later, they are stopped by vigilantes guarding their settlement and robbed of everything useful, including their vehicles and guns. Fortunately, they are only 50 miles (80 km) away from their goal. Now on foot, they come upon an isolated farmhouse. They kill the farmer and his wife and take their guns. While staying in an abandoned factory Pirrie's wife Clara attempts to seduce John and is shot by her husband. Mary and Pirrie become close, as Mary believes Pirrie can protect her. Next, they encounter a larger group trudging the other way. John offers to take them along to his brother's easily protected valley. Their leader objects and goes for his gun, so Pirrie shoots him. The others decide to join John's party.

As they walk beside a road, a motorcycle gang rides by. John's wife Ann recognizes one of them as the escaped rapist. The armed gang mount a series of mounted attacks, but are killed in the ensuing gun battle, as are some of John's people.

When they finally reach David's place, they see that it is well protected by a stone wall and a machine gun. David tells John privately that he cannot let such a large number of people in – the valley cannot feed so many – and suggests John sneak away from his group in the night with his family and Roger. Instead, John mounts a night attack. Pirrie shoots David, who is manning the machine gun, but is himself also killed. The attack is successful, and John takes charge of the valley.

== Cast ==
- Nigel Davenport as John Custance
- Jean Wallace as Ann Custance
- John Hamill as Roger Burnham
- Lynne Frederick as Mary Custance
- Patrick Holt as David Custance
- Ruth Kettlewell as fat woman
- M. J. Matthews as George
- Michael Percival as Police Constable
- Tex Fuller as Mr Beaseley
- Simon Merrick as TV interviewer
- Anthony Sharp as Sir Charles Brenner
- George Coulouris as Mr Sturdevant
- Anthony May as Pirrie
- Wendy Richard as Clara
- Max Hartnell as Lieutenant
- John Lewis as Corporal
- Norman Atkyns as Dr. Cassop
- Nigel Rathbone as Davey
- Christopher Lofthouse as Spooks
- John Avison as Yorkshire Sergeant
- Jimmy Winston as 1st Hun
- Richard Penny as 2nd Hun
- R.C. Driscoll as 3rd Hun
- Geoffrey Hooper as Tweed Jacket
- Christopher Wilson as farmer
- William Duffy as murdered farmer
- Mervyn Cumming as Joe Ashton (as Mervyn Patrick)
- Denise Mockler as Emily Ashton
- Ross Allan as Alf Parsons
- Karen Terry as Parson's daughter
- Joan Ward as Mrs Parsons
- Brian Crabtree as Joe Harris
- Susan Sydney as Liz Harris
- Michael Landy as Jess Arkwright
- Louise Kay as Susan Arkwright
- Bruce Myers as Bill Riggs
- Margaret Chapman as Prudence Riggs
- Christopher Neame as Locke
- Bridget Brice as Jill Locke

== Production ==
Filming began on 11 May 1970 in the Lake District and then at Elstree Studios. It was the first film made by MGM European production head Robert Littman.

== Reception ==
The Monthly Film Bulletin wrote: "The prophetic warning of No Blade of Grass is completely vitiated by the crudity of its social stereotypes (the marauding motorcyclists called 'Huns' recall the character credited as 'Man' in The Naked Prey), while the moral disintegration of the individual characters lacks any psychological strength or consistency. One of the typical elements of this kind of apocalyptic science fiction – a longing for the destruction of civilisation and a return to nature – comes across here as a snide parallel between the struggle for survival in rural England and that in the old West ('Just like Custer's last stand', as a delighted schoolboy announces during one battle). Related to this is a mild anarchic joy in violence and survival of the fittest, though the violence here lacks the intensity of Beach Red or The Naked Prey and leaves Wilde's naive social and psychological formulas firmly holding the floor."

Variety wrote: "The film has several dramatic and production flaws, but in an odd way these add an effective, semi-documentary immediacy. ... Often raw and violent, pic can, with hardly an extra thought, cause nightmares; in the domestic market, it is properly rated R. ... Nigel Davenport and Jean Wallace (Mrs. Wilde) head a good and believable cast. ... Wilde's direction is in tune with the nervous energy of the story, and with editors Frank Clarke and Eric Boyd-Perkins, many of the action sequences (gang rape, street riots, hand-to-hand survival combat) are paced superbly and excitingly. The extensive over-use of flash-forwards seems an unnecessary device, first confusing, later telegraphing what should be suspense. ... Film wisely restrains its preachiness, instead concentrating on the inevitable human reactions in any major panic."

Roger Greenspun wrote in The New York Times: "From time to time, No Blade of Grass, with its marauding gangs, its suburban ruin, its wreck‐encrusted highways. invites comparison with Jean‐Luc Godard's Weekend — a comparison that is in no way in its favor. On the level of grade‐C adventure it works well enough, but on the several other levels not which it aspires, it does not work at all. ... More laughable than terrifying, No Blade of Grass means to annex a number of contemporary nightmares. I assume that this opportunism is well intentioned, but it is also utterly confused – even to the point of not making any real connection between pollution, population and the unstoppable plant disease. 'Do you know, just two days ago we were a civilized country!' muses Mrs. Custance, having already committed her first murder and suffered her first rape. But since the film more or less presents civilization as the cause and not the cure of all her woes, I can't help feeling that she is really in mourning for some mythic past when we were all organically grown and biodegradable."

Reviewing the film's release on DVD, Sight & Sound wrote: "The spasmodic editing experiments that marked Wilde's 1967 Beach Red have become full-blown apoplexy here. The journey of the Custances and co is fragged with crosscutting madness, crimson-blotched flashforwards, voiceover fragments, even a freezeframe flipbook. A mess compared to John Hillcoat's stately post-apocalypse in The Road – though to these eyes the subject-matter and Wilde's berserk, tacky, cudgelling sensibility achieve a bracing singularity of purpose."

== Accolades ==
The film was nominated for the Hugo Award for Best Dramatic Presentation.

== Rape scene controversy ==
The original cut of No Blade of Grass contained a scene where a group of three biker men abduct and rape Ann Custance (played by Jean Wallace) and her 16-year-old virgin daughter, Mary (played by Lynne Frederick in her film debut). The intense graphic nature and sexual violence of the scene generated some mild controversy from critics who felt it was gratuitous. Compounding matters was that Lynne Frederick, who was one of the rape victims in the scene, was only 15 at the time and questions over the use of a body double remain a controversial topic to this day.

In response to the controversy, re-releases of the film on VHS trimmed the rape sequence down by about a minute and a half. The uncut version appeared on DVD in numerous budget priced editions. In 2011, the Warner Archive Collection released No Blade of Grass with the rape scene intact.

== Music ==
The title song for the film, "No Blade of Grass" (Charles Carroll, Louis Nelius), was recorded by Roger Whittaker and released on his album New World in the Morning (1971). It was covered by American disc jockey Casey Kasem as a spoken-word recording.

== See also ==
- List of American films of 1970
- Survival film, about the film genre, with a list of related films
