= Empty World =

1977 apocalyptic fiction novel by John Christopher

- First edition (UK)
- Author: John Christopher
- Cover artist: Craig Dodd
- Language: English
- Genre: Post-apocalyptic
- Publisher: Hamish Hamilton (UK); E. P. Dutton (US)
- Publication date: 29 September 1977 (UK); 20 March 1978 (US)
- Publication place: United Kingdom
- Media type: hardcover paperback
- Pages: 134
- ISBN: 0-241-89751-3 (UK); 0-525-29250-0 (US)

Empty World is a 1977 apocalyptic fiction novel written by John Christopher aimed at an adolescent audience. It was Christopher's eleventh such novel. It is centered around Neil Miller and his struggle to come to terms with the loss of his parents in a car crash and the subsequent Calcutta Plague that decimates the adult population. The novel is set in England in the late 1970s.

== Plot ==
15-year-old Neil Miller's world explodes when he and his family are involved in a car accident that kills his parents. Sent to live with his grandparents in a small village named Winchelsea, England, Neil suffers from post traumatic stress. Soon, a devastating illness called the Calcutta Plague makes headlines, killing thousands of people in India in a matter of months. The virus begins spreading across the world, making its way to the small village where Neil lives. It is a strange illness as it only affects the adults and none of the children, and once again Neil finds himself an orphan after his grandparents succumb to the disease.

Neil attempts to care for two younger children also orphaned by the plague, but they also contract the virus and die as he tries to care for them. During this time Neil notes that he has contracted the plague, but after a brief fever it leaves him unaffected. Now the sole survivor in Winchelsea and deciding that the village is becoming dangerous, he leaves for London where he meets his first fellow survivor: the mentally unbalanced Clive.

Soon after, he finds two girls, Lucy and Billie, creating an unstable threesome. Attracted to Neil, Lucy begins pulling away from Billie, and in her fear of loneliness and out of desperation Billie attempts to kill Neil when they are on a foraging expedition. She stabs him in the back. Neil discovers she has emptied his gun but he manages to overpower Billie and escapes back to Lucy.

Billie arrives back at the house and pleads with both Lucy and Neil to let her back in, but they decide that they could never trust her again, and leave her outside. In the last paragraph of the book Neil abruptly changes his mind, feeling that he would never get over the guilt of leaving Billie to die, and with Lucy goes downstairs to open the door and let her back inside.

== Background ==
Christopher has said the inspiration for Empty World comes from "the recollection of a childish daydream". He suspected it was a fantasy shared by most children: a world without adults and the restrictions they place on children. He thought it would be fun if it was just him and a few friends left to do as they pleased, with everything at their disposal. He felt that it was a grim daydream and that Empty World was an exploration of that daydream. For him, personally, he was analyzing the "people-need-people cliche".

== Reviews ==
Empty World has been well received. The characters and the loneliness of Neil's journey is well developed, and the English setting of the novel will not discourage American readers, especially children as it is "not too English". Christopher offers a chilly story, encouraging the youthful to explore darker and more realistic themes of greed, mistrust, despair, and insanities. Empty World has been compared to novels like Secret City, U.S.A., by Felice Holman and When the City Stopped, by Joan Phipson.

== Adaptations ==
The German station ZDF produced a TV adaptation of Empty World in 1987.
