= New Found Land (Christopher novel) =

1983 novel by John Christopher

- First edition
- Author: John Christopher
- Language: English
- Series: Fireball
- Genre: Alternate history
- Publisher: Gollancz
- Publication date: 27 January 1983
- Publication place: United Kingdom
- Media type: Print
- Pages: 135 pp
- ISBN: 0-575-03222-7
- Preceded by: Fireball
- Followed by: Dragon Dance

New Found Land is a young adult alternate history novel by John Christopher, the second in his Fireball series. It was first published in 1983.

== Plot summary ==
In the first novel, Fireball, Simon and Brad are cousins who are mysteriously transported to an alternate history Earth, where the Roman Empire did not break up and Europe remains in pre-Dark Ages technology. In an attempt to improve their status in the new realm, Simon and Brad aid the Christian Church, which is oppressed, to launch a coup by introducing the stirrup and the longbow. The coup succeeds, but the boys did not anticipate the Church as a state power would force everyone in the Empire to convert or die. At the end of the first book, they sail away to the New World, which in the realm, was not discovered yet by the Old World.

At the beginning of this novel, they managed to reach the American continent safely. They are received warmly enough by the native tribes in North America, but soon find themselves yearning for more advanced civilizations.

However, after they attempt to sail down the coast to warmer waters as winter sets on, they are captured by Vikings. In this parallel world the Vikings were introduced to the Latin language and instead of dying out, they have colonized the American continent. Brad, Simon, and their companions Bos and Curtius are greeted warmly by the Vikings and believe they can live here permanently, only to realize that they are to be sacrificed. They escape, but Curtius is killed in the fighting as they leave.

Trekking across the continent, they head for the only civilization in America which has significant urban living - the Aztecs. As the Roman Empire has persisted in Europe of this realm until the 20th century due to unchanging conditions, the Aztec civilization too has continued without encounters from the Europeans' discovery of the New World.

In order to quickly gain wealth and status to enjoy a comfortable living, they take part in the sacred games, which is a cross between squash, tennis and handball. Their aim though is to finish second, as the victors will be sacrificed to the gods. Unfortunately, they win.

To escape the fate of the winners, they escape again, and this time, are captured by sailors from the Far East.

Their story continues in the last book of the trilogy, Dragon Dance.
