= The Lotus Caves =

1969 novel by John Christopher

- First edition
- Author: John Christopher
- Genre: science fiction, young adult literature
- Publisher: Hamish Hamilton
- Publication date: 1969
- Pages: 156

The Lotus Caves is a juvenile science fiction novel by John Christopher, first published in 1969.

It is clearly inspired by the Lotus-eaters of Greek Mythology.

== Plot synopsis ==
Two teenage boys, Marty and Steve, live in a colony on the Moon, "The Bubble", in the year 2068. Exploring outside the dome of "The Bubble" is strictly controlled. Although they live comfortably, reliance on expensive transport from Earth makes most resources expensive, and careful avoidance of waste is a priority for the colony.

The boys grow bored and decide to borrow a lunar vehicle. They discover someone has forgotten to remove their key, which makes it possible for them to explore beyond proscribed boundaries without restriction. They go on a journey to an old and abandoned base, where they find the diary of Andrew Thurgood, a missing early lunar settler. The diary contains coordinates to a place Thurgood claimed he saw something that looked like a huge flower, and the boys decide to go there and do some investigating themselves.

They crash through the Moon's surface into a series of caverns containing fluorescent plants, many of them able to move, which is a part of and controlled by a single intelligent alien life form. They also meet Thurgood, who has become enthralled by the alien and does not seem to have aged during the seventy years since his disappearance. The boys are torn between staying in the caves, within which the alien provides an idyllic life fulfilling all their needs, and escaping. The longer they stay, the more their minds are affected, a fact they notice and suspect is related to the food the alien provides. They eventually escape, but the man decides to stay, having lost any desires beyond worshipping the alien.

On the way back to the base, the boys discuss what would happen to the caves if they became common knowledge. They agree to keep them a secret, believing that the alien and Thurgood deserve to be left in peace.

== Theme ==
The novel's main theme is that of the development of a young person's will and independence, and the conflict between benevolent authority and individual conscience. This theme occurs in several other novels by Christopher, such as the "Tripods" sequence, although the authority is far from benevolent. However in The Lotus Caves an important aspect of this theme is the invitation to devote a human life to the worship of a non-human force, comparable to religious devotion to god. The human devotee is promised a kind of immortality, but it is also a form of enslavement.

== Adaptations ==
=== Film ===
A film adaptation of the book was in development in 2007, from Walden Media, to be written by Brian Klugman and Lee Sternthal and directed by Rpin Suwannath.

=== Television ===
In 2010, the US television network Syfy ordered a pilot episode based on the story. They finally commissioned a series in 2012. The series was called High Moon. Principal photography for the pilot began on August 26, 2013, in Vancouver. The episode was directed by Adam Kane and was written by Jim Gray from an adaptation by Bryan Fuller and Gray.

Syfy ultimately passed on the series, but the pilot was released as a TV movie and aired on September 15, 2014.

== See also ==
- The Moon in fiction
