= John Christopher =

English writer (1922–2012)

- Born: Christopher Samuel Youd; 16 April 1922; Huyton, Lancashire, England
- Died: 3 February 2012 (aged 89); Bath, Somerset, England
- Education: Peter Symonds College
- Occupation: Writer
- Writing career
- Pen name: John Christopher (science fiction), several others
- Genre: Science fiction
- Notable works: The Death of Grass; The Tripods; The Guardians
- Notable awards: Guardian Prize; 1971

Sam Youd (16 April 1922 – 3 February 2012) was a British writer best known for science fiction written under the name of John Christopher, including the novels The Death of Grass, The Possessors, and the young-adult novel series The Tripods. He won the Guardian Children's Fiction Prize in 1971 and the Deutscher Jugendliteraturpreis in 1976.

Youd also wrote under variations of his own name and under the pseudonyms Stanley Winchester, Hilary Ford, William Godfrey, William Vine, Peter Graaf, Peter Nichols, and Anthony Rye.

== Biography ==
Sam Youd was born in Huyton, Lancashire (though Youd is an old Cheshire surname). Youd was educated at Peter Symonds' School in Winchester, Hampshire, then served in the Royal Corps of Signals from 1941 to 1946. A scholarship from the Rockefeller Foundation made it possible for him to pursue a writing career, beginning with The Winter Swan (Dennis Dobson, 1949), published under the name Christopher Youd. He wrote science fiction short stories as John Christopher from 1951, and his first book under that name was The Twenty-Second Century, a collection of science fiction stories; a few of the stories included had first appeared in magazines under the name Sam Youd. His first science fiction novel, Year of the Comet, was published by Michael Joseph in 1955, also under the name John Christopher. His second novel under the Christopher pseudonym, The Death of Grass (Michael Joseph, 1956) was Youd's first major success as a writer. It was published in the United States the following year as No Blade of Grass (Simon & Schuster, 1957). An American magazine published Year of the Comet later that year and it was issued in 1959 as an Avon paperback entitled Planet in Peril. Youd continued to use the pen name John Christopher for the majority of his writing and all of his science fiction. The Death of Grass has been reissued many times, most recently in the Penguin Modern Classics (2009).

In 1966 Youd started writing science fiction for adolescents, using the name John Christopher in every case. The Tripods trilogy (1967–68), The Lotus Caves (1969), The Guardians (1970) and the Sword of the Spirits trilogy (1971–72) were all well received. He won the annual Guardian Children's Fiction Prize for The Guardians. In 1976 he won the Deutscher Jugendliteraturpreis, youth fiction category, for the same novel in its German translation, Die Wächter.

In 1946 he married Joyce Fairbairn, with whom he had five children (one son and four daughters). He divorced in 1978, marrying Jessica Ball.

Youd lived for many years in Rye, East Sussex and died in Bath, Somerset, on 3 February 2012, of complications from bladder cancer.

== Film and television adaptations ==
The Death of Grass was adapted as a film by Cornel Wilde under its American title, No Blade of Grass (1970). The Tripods was partially developed into a British TV series. Empty World was developed into a 1987 TV movie in Germany, Leere Welt. The Guardians was made into a 1986 TV series in Germany, Die Wächter. The Lotus Caves was in development in 2007 as a film from Walden Media, to have been directed by Rpin Suwannath. Later, in 2013, a TV pilot based loosely on The Lotus Caves was developed by Bryan Fuller and titled High Moon. The pilot did not get picked up as a series, but was released on SyFy and Netflix in 2014.

== Bibliography ==
Except where stated otherwise, all items listed are novels or novellas published as books.

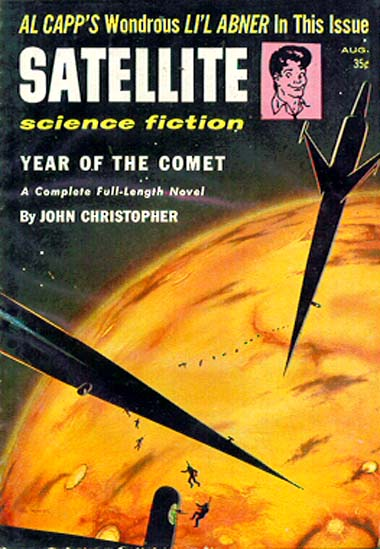
Christopher's novel The Year of the Comet saw its first U.S. publication in the August 1957 issue of Satellite Science Fiction

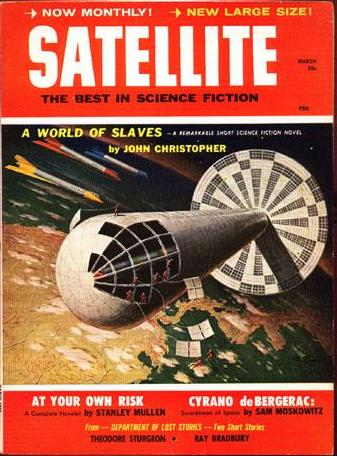
Christopher's novella "A World of Slaves" was the cover story on the March 1959 issue of Satellite Science Fiction

=== John Christopher ===
- The Twenty-Second Century (1954) (short story collection)
- The Year of the Comet (Michael Joseph, 1955); US title, Planet in Peril (Avon, 1959)
- The Death of Grass (Michael Joseph, 1956); US title, No Blade of Grass (Simon & Schuster, 1957)
- The Caves of Night (1958)
- A Scent of White Poppies (1959)
- The Long Voyage (US title The White Voyage, 1960)
- The World in Winter (US title The Long Winter, 1962)
- Cloud on Silver (US title Sweeney's Island, 1964)
- The Possessors (1964)
- A Wrinkle in the Skin (US title The Ragged Edge, 1965)
- The Little People (1966)
- The Tripods trilogy (expanded to tetralogy, 1988)
  - The White Mountains (1967) Macmillan (US); Hamish Hamilton (UK)
    - 35th anniversary edition, with revised text and preface by author, Simon & Schuster, ISBN 9780689855047 (2003)
  - The City of Gold and Lead (1967) Macmillan (US); Hamish Hamilton (UK)
  - The Pool of Fire (1968) Macmillan (US); Hamish Hamilton (UK)
  - When the Tripods Came (prequel) (1988)
- Pendulum (1968)
- The Lotus Caves (1969) Macmillan (US); Hamish Hamilton (UK) ISBN 0-241-01729-7
- The Guardians (1970)
- The Sword of the Spirits trilogy
  - The Prince In Waiting (1970)
  - Beyond the Burning Lands (1971)
  - The Sword of the Spirits (1972)
- In the Beginning Longman (1972) ISBN 0-582-53726-6
- Dom and Va (1973)
- Wild Jack (1974)
- Empty World (1977)
- The Fireball trilogy
  - Fireball (1981), E. P. Dutton, ISBN 0-525-29738-3
  - New Found Land (1983), Dutton (US), ISBN 0-525-44049-6. Gollancz (UK), ISBN 0-575-03222-7
  - Dragon Dance (1986) Dutton (US) ISBN 0-525-44227-8; Viking Kestrel (UK), ISBN 0-670-81030-4
- A Dusk of Demons (1993)
- Bad Dream (2003)

=== Christopher Youd ===
- The Winter Swan (1949)

=== Samuel Youd ===
- Babel Itself (1951)
- Brave Conquerors (1952)
- Crown and Anchor (1953)
- A Palace of Strangers (1954)
- Holly Ash (US title The Opportunist, 1955)
- Giant's Arrow (1956); as Anthony Rye in the UK, Samuel Youd in the US
- The Choice (UK title The Burning Bird, 1961)
- Messages of Love (1961)
- The Summers at Accorn (1963)

=== William Godfrey ===
- Malleson at Melbourne (1956) - a cricket novel, volume 1 of an unfinished trilogy
- The Friendly Game (1957) - volume 2 of the trilogy

=== William Vine ===
- "Death Sentence" (short story), Imagination Science Fiction, June 1953
- "Explosion Delayed" (short story), Space Science Fiction, July 1953

=== Peter Graaf ===
- Dust and the Curious Boy (1957); US title, Give the Devil His Due - volume 1 in the Joe Dust series
- Daughter Fair (1958) - volume 2 in the Joe Dust series
- The Sapphire Conference (1959) - volume 3 in the Joe Dust series
- The Gull's Kiss (1962)

=== Hilary Ford ===
- Felix Walking (1958)
- Felix Running (1959)
- Bella on the Roof (1965)
- A Figure in Grey (1973)
- Sarnia (1974)
- Castle Malindine (1975)
- A Bride for Bedivere (1976)

=== Peter Nichols ===
- Patchwork of Death (1965)

=== Stanley Winchester ===
- The Practice (1968)
- Men With Knives (1968); US title, A Man With a Knife
- The Helpers (1970)
- Ten Per Cent of Your Life (1973)

== Short stories ==
Youd's first published story was "Dreamer" in the March 1941 Weird Tales, as C.S. Youd. He had stories published in the magazines Astounding Science Fiction, Science Fantasy, Worlds Beyond Science-Fantasy Fiction, New Worlds, Galaxy Science Fiction, SF Digest, Future Science Fiction, Space SF Digest, Thrilling Wonder Stories, Authentic Science Fiction, Space Science Fiction, Nebula Science Fiction, Fantastic Universe, Saturn Science Fiction, Orbit Science Fiction, Fantastic Story Magazine, If: Worlds of Science Fiction, Worlds of Science Fiction (UK), Argosy (UK), The Magazine of Fantasy and Science Fiction, Beyond Infinity

== Serializations ==
No Blade of Grass was serialized in The Saturday Evening Post in 1957. Caves of Night was serialized in John Bull Magazine in 1958. The Little People was serialized in The Magazine of Fantasy & Science Fiction in 1967.

== Anthology appearances ==
- The Best SF Stories 3rd Series by Grayson & Grayson (1953)
- Avon Science fiction and Fantasy Reader #1 (1953)
- The Twenty-Second Century Grayson & Grayson (1954)
- Gateway To Tomorrow edited by John Carnell, published by Panther (1963)
- Avon Science Fiction and Fantasy Reader No. 2
- The Best Science Fiction Stories Third Series edited by Everett F. Bleiler and T. E. Dikty
- The Tenth Pan Book of Horror Stories, edited by Herbert Van Thal (1969)
- Young Winter’s Tales No. 2, ed. M. R. Hodgkin, London: Macmillan (1971)
- In Time to Come, Topliner (1973)
- The Best of British SF 1 Orbit Books (1977)
- The Random House Book of Science Fiction Stories Random House (1997) (ISBN 0-679-88527-7)
- The Young Oxford Book of Nasty Endings, (1997), edited by Dennis Pepper, Oxford University Press, ISBN 0-19-278151-0
