= A Dusk of Demons =

1994 novel by John Christopher

- First edition cover
- Author: John Christopher
- Cover artist: Stephen Player
- Language: English
- Genre: Science fiction
- Publisher: Hamish Hamilton
- Publication date: 1993
- Publication place: United Kingdom
- Media type: Print
- ISBN: 0-241-13378-5

A Dusk of Demons is a young adult science fiction novel written by the British author John Christopher and published in 1993. The story is set in a post-apocalyptic future in England where it is believed that demons rule Earth.

== Plot summary ==
Ben is a fourteen-year-old boy living a simple life on Old Isle, where the Master rules. Ben lives a carefree life with Mother Ryan and her two daughters, Antonia and Paddy, until the Master dies and leaves Ben a substantial inheritance. Not long after, the Master's house is burned to the ground. People whisper among themselves that it was the work of demons, as they believe that the demons are displeased with the Master. The Sheriff takes Ben into custody until the matter is resolved, sending Paddy's family away. Paddy warns Ben that the villagers are planning to harm him and they flee with the help of a fisherman named Joe. After journeying to the Mainland, they are reunited with Mother Ryan and Antonia in the villa of the General. The Sheriff soon arrives, apologizes, and contests with the General for the care of Ben.

Meanwhile, Antonia's relationship with the Governor's son, Ralph, causes her to be exiled. She and her family are to be sent to Ireland, while Ben is to stay and receive his inheritance. Paddy, however, comes back for Ben and they escape together once more. They travel with gypsies for a time and are shocked to learn that these travelers do not fear demons or the will of the "Dark One". They part with the gypsies and continue to try and catch up with Mother Ryan but are taken captive by an enemy general who sacrifices criminals to the demons. Paddy is sentenced but Ben saves her by shooting the demons' "nest". They are pursued until a fire bursts, which renders them unconscious. Ben wakes up on an airplane where his rescuer tells him that the demons were fabricated by a secretive group in an attempt to keep people from becoming violent.

The Master had been a member of this group but was exiled for speaking out against the terror caused by the pretended demons. After his death, a revolution was organized for helping people recover from the chaos and become educated. Ben, as the Master's son, is expected to help.

== Characters ==
Ben—The narrator. A young boy who grows up carefree as the ward of Mother Ryan. He finds out that he is the Master's son and faces many challenges while trying to receive his inheritance. He faces the challenges with Paddy Ryan, his childhood companion.

Paddy Ryan—Ben's closest friend. The daughter of Mother Ryan and sister of Antonia. She travels with Ben everywhere and tries to help him.

Mother Ryan—Ben's caretaker and Paddy's mother. Mother Ryan came to Old Isle with the Master from Ireland and agreed to take care of his son. She is eventually sent back to Ireland.

Antonia Ryan—Paddy's older sister. She is described as being pretty and sarcastic. At one point she falls in love with General Pengelly's son, Ralph. She accompanies her mother when she was sent back to Ireland.

Sheriff Wilson—Sheriff of the Western Isles. He is known for being a good sheriff, but Ben does not trust him and his conniving smile. He tries to control Ben.

General Pengelly—A mainland general who takes in Ben and the Ryans until his son falls in love with Antonia. He also tries to control Ben.

The Master—Once the Custodian, a leader of a council of sea people. He was exiled to Ireland and later came to Old Isle after his wife was killed in a fire. He dies and leaves all his property and his title to Ben.

Mordecai—A gypsy who takes Paddy and Ben in as they are running away from the Villa. Having lost two children of his own, he grows fond of them and teaches them how to live on their own while they stay with him.

== Themes ==
John Christopher is known for using the genre of science fiction to explore deep questions and changes in the world. His books also reflect themes of individuality and free will. A Dusk of Demons uses a futuristic environment to explore reactions of people to their environment and the conditions of society. The people in the book are controlled by a fear of demons that a secret group fabricated to prevent people from being destroyed by their own violent nature. Many societies under the control of the demons turned violent as a way to control others. It is later emphasized that, despite the darker side of human nature, people should be allowed access to knowledge and have choice in how they want to live. It is also through the power of an individual that society is able to change.

Other themes in the book deal with coming of age, the importance of being willing to act, and the fallibility of human nature.
