= A Wrinkle in the Skin =

1965 novel by John Christopher

A Wrinkle In The Skin
- First edition
- Author: John Christopher
- Cover artist: Brian Keogh
- Language: English
- Genre: Science fiction
- Publisher: Hodder and Stoughton
- Publication date: 1965 (UK)
- Publication place: United Kingdom
- Media type: Print (Hardcover)
- Pages: 220

A Wrinkle In The Skin (also known as The Ragged Edge) is a 1965 post-apocalyptic science fiction novel written by the English author John Christopher.

== Plot summary ==
A massive series of powerful earthquakes on a worldwide scale reduce towns and cities to rubble and plunge the few survivors into barbarism. Most of western Europe is dramatically uplifted, transforming the English Channel into a muddy desert, while elsewhere lands are plunged below sealevel and flooded.

The protagonist is Matthew Cotter, a Guernsey horticulturalist who finds himself one of only a handful of survivors on the former island. Cotter decides to trek across the empty seabed to England, in the faint hope that his daughter has somehow survived. He finds the situation on the former mainland has descended to barbarism, with competing bands of scavengers preying on survivors. He and his companion, a young boy named Billy, meet a captain who has lost his mind, in his ship on the bottom of the Channel. They are welcomed heartily, provided with food, clothes, and lodging, and even shown movies, but forbidden to take any provisions with them when they leave. They finally make their way to the borders of Sussex, where his daughter was staying, only to discover that the land has slipped beneath the sea.

Cotter and Billy eventually return to Guernsey, where they are unexpectedly reunited with a group of survivors that they had met on the former mainland.
