= The Tripods =

Book series by John Christopher

- Author: John Christopher
- Country: United Kingdom
- Language: English
- Genre: Young adult, science fiction
- Publisher: Hamish Hamilton (U.K.); Simon & Schuster (U.S.)
- Published: 1967
- No. of books: 4

The Tripods is a series of young adult science fiction novels by John Christopher. The series takes place in a post-apocalyptic world where humanity is enslaved by "Tripods"—gigantic three-legged walking machines piloted by an alien race later identified as the "Masters". The first two books were the basis of a science fiction TV series, produced in the United Kingdom in the 1980s.

== Synopsis ==
The story of The Tripods is a variation on post-apocalyptic literature, wherein humanity has been enslaved by "Tripods"—gigantic three-legged walking machines, piloted by unseen alien entities (later identified as "Masters"). Human society is largely pastoral, with few habitations larger than villages, and what little industry exists is conducted under the watchful presence of the Tripods. Lifestyle is reminiscent of the Middle Ages, but small artifacts from the Modern Age are still used as status symbols, such as the protagonist's father owning a watch.

Humans are controlled from age 14 by implants called "Caps," which suppress individuality and free will and make them docile. Some people's minds are broken by the Caps; they become so-called "Vagrants." According to The City of Gold and Lead, Masters begin to believe that humans should be capped at an earlier age "because some humans, in the year or two before they are Capped, become rebellious and act against the Masters," but this cannot be done, because Capping must wait until the braincase has stopped growing.

== Series ==
=== The White Mountains (1967) ===
Life is like the Middle Ages in the pre-industrial era, except that all adolescent and adult humans are subject to Tripod control. Protagonist Will Parker, a thirteen-year-old boy living in the fictional English village of Wherton, is looking forward to being Capped at the next Capping Day, until a chance meeting with a mysterious fake-Capped man named Ozymandias (taking his name from a poem he frequently recites) prompts him to discover a world beyond the Tripods' control. Together with his cousin Henry and later a French teenager named Jean-Paul Deliet, nicknamed "Beanpole", they move off towards the White Mountains to avoid being Capped. On the way, they encounter a girl, Eloise, who is a possible romantic interest for Will, but when he realizes she is Capped (earlier than expected) they move on. The novel climaxes with Henry and Beanpole discovering that earlier, when Will was captured by a Tripod, he was unknowingly implanted with a tracking device. When Henry and Beanpole remove the device, a nearby Tripod attacks them, but the boys defeat the Tripod and elude subsequent efforts to find them. The story ends with them joining the resistance, located in the eponymous White Mountains. The White Mountains also are free from the Tripods.

=== The City of Gold and Lead (1967) ===
After a year in the White Mountains, the resistance charges Will, Beanpole, and a German boy, Fritz, who are equipped with fake Caps, to infiltrate a Tripod city by competing in a regional sporting exhibition where the winners will be taken by the Tripods. Will, a boxer, and Fritz, a runner, win their respective contests, while Beanpole fails to win in the jumping events.

The winners are taken to the Tripod city in a pressurized dome astride a river. Inside the city, the boys encounter the Tripods' operators, whom they refer to as the "Masters". Human males are slaves inside the cities, while beautiful females are killed and preserved for the Masters to admire. Will discovers Eloise among them. Slaves are furnished with breathing masks to survive the aliens' atmosphere but are rapidly exhausted by the stronger artificial gravity and must therefore be periodically replaced (hence the selection through athletic contests). The gold in the title refers to the city's colour; both gold and lead refer to the heightened gravity.

While Fritz is abused by his Master, Will is treated as a privileged pet by his. Eventually, Will's Master reveals a plan to xenoform Earth by replacing the planet's atmosphere with the Masters' toxic air, to enable full control of the Earth. When the Master finds Will's diary accidentally, Will kills him to maintain the secret. With the assistance of Fritz (who temporarily stays behind to maintain Will's alibi), Will escapes. The story ends with Will and Beanpole giving Fritz up for dead and returning to the White Mountains.

=== The Pool of Fire (1968) ===
Will and Fritz (who had managed to escape the city after all) travel to Eastern Europe, the Caucasus, and the Middle East to organize resistance against the Tripods. The resistance, having ambushed a Tripod and captured a Master, accidentally discover that alcohol has a strong soporific effect on them, and use this knowledge to simultaneously attack their cities. Having introduced alcohol into the aliens' city water systems, raiding groups kill the Masters in two of the three cities by forcing open airlocks and exposing the unconscious aliens to Earth's atmosphere. However, the attack on the third city (located in Panama) fails. After an attack using simple aeroplanes and aerial bombs also fails, another attack is undertaken using hot air balloons developed by Beanpole. After most bombs detonate either before making contact with the dome of the city, or after the bomb has bounced clear, Henry jumps from his balloon onto the city's domed roof and holds the bomb in place, sacrificing himself and shattering the dome. Earth's atmosphere kills the Masters, and Henry is remembered as a hero.

Sometime later, the Masters' atmosphere-seeding spaceship arrives and destroys the remains of their cities, then leaves—to prevent the humans from reverse engineering their technology—although Beanpole notes that they have already learned much from the cities. Modern human technology, which was halted during the Masters' rule, is rediscovered rapidly, including the theory of space travel.

The saga ends with the Resistance leader Julius being deposed at a summit of nations. In contrast to Julius' efforts to unite the world, the alliance built during the resistance falls apart, with nationalistic hostilities reappearing and each country going their separate ways. Will, Beanpole, and Fritz reunite as a tribute to Julius, to work towards establishing a better world.

=== When the Tripods Came (1988) ===
When the Tripods Came is a prequel written twenty years after the publication of the original trilogy. The plot follows the description of the conquest given in The City of Gold and Lead.

Fearing the technological potential of humanity, the so-called "Masters", unable to defeat humanity in a conventional war, hypnotise people through a television program called The Trippy Show, later using temporary and finally permanent Caps to control them.

As in the original trilogy, the narrator of When the Tripods Came is a young English boy. He and a friend bear witness to a botched initial invasion by a single Tripod in the British countryside. After the event is old news, The Trippy Show begins broadcasting, and engenders in some viewers an enthusiasm that gradually becomes a mania. As an increasingly hypnotized society falls under the control of the Masters, he and his family escape to Guernsey by boat. When they find it is also controlled by the Capped, they hijack a plane to Switzerland, which has managed to restrict its hypnotized population better than other European nations. When the Swiss are eventually invaded and enslaved, the narrator and his family establish the "White Mountains" resistance movement of the original trilogy.

=== Editions ===
Editions have been published by:

- Hamish Hamilton (UK First Edition)
- Simon & Schuster (USA First Edition)
- Collier Books
- E. P. Dutton
- Thorndike Press
- Knight Books
- Turtleback Books
- Beaver Books
- Audible Studios (audiobook)

The series has been translated into Arabic, Dutch, Danish, Finnish, French, German, Hebrew, Persian, Spanish, Greek, and Mandarin Chinese (Taiwan).

== Comic books ==
Multiple graphic adaptations have been produced, notably including:

- Boys' Life, the monthly magazine of the Boy Scouts of America, serialised all three books in the trilogy from May 1981 to August 1986. Artist Frank Bolle drew the single page black and white proofs, which were then inked by another person.
- In 1985, the BBC initiated BEEB, the BBC Junior Television Magazine, and started to present in picture strip form additional adventures of Will, Henry, and Beanpole on their way to the White Mountains, starting at some unspecified point during the fourth episode of the first BBC serial as the trio pass through ruined Paris, and then heading off at a tangent to the television version. From Issue 6, the boys were accompanied on their journey by a young woman named Fizzio, a character original to the strip. The strips were drawn by John M. Burns and in each issue, they consisted of three pages; the first two in colour and the third in black and white. The storyline was never concluded as BEEB ceased publication after only 20 issues.
- Masters were one of the species detailed in Barlowe's Guide to Extraterrestrials.

== Television series ==
The television version of The Tripods was jointly produced by the BBC in the United Kingdom and the Seven Network in Australia. The music soundtrack was written by Ken Freeman. The series was noted for being one of the first to feature computer generated graphics and special effects.

Series one of The Tripods, broadcast in 1984, which had 13 half-hour episodes written by the well-known author of many radio plays Alick Rowe, covers the first book, The White Mountains; the 12-episode second series adapted and written by Christopher Penfold (1985) covers The City of Gold and Lead. Although a television script had been written for the third series "The Pool of Fire", it never went into production.

The first series was released on both VHS and DVD. The BBC released Tripods—The Complete Series 1 & 2 on DVD in March 2009.

=== Comparison with the novels ===
When the BBC made the television series of The Tripods in the 1980s, they departed from Christopher's description of the Masters. In the television series, the Masters somewhat resemble the Tripods they drive. This makes the Tripods seem much more like mecha, similar to those described in The War of the Worlds, than purely eccentric vehicles. In the BBC serial, the Masters did not need to eat, sleep or drink as humans do. Additionally, they were not the rulers of the city, but were, in turn, under the rule of higher beings made of pure energy, known as Cognoscs. The Masters came from a planet named Trion that was in the center of a triple star system.

The method by which the Masters name themselves is also different. Rather than having names, they are simply called by their addresses. Will's Master is called West Avenue 4, Sector 6, Level 8, or West 468.

The Masters in the BBC production enjoyed a hotter living environment. It was also established that the rigors of the Master's environment cause premature aging in humans. Treatment of humans slaves varied—ranging from the harsh and thoughtless abuse of "miner" slaves to the relatively luxurious amenities provided to the "power elite".

To avoid an overuse of the mechanical Tripods, the producers invented a new faction, the "Black Guards," as a human police force with the task to enforce the will of the Masters. They served as a more immediate threat for Will, his friends and the resistance.

== Potential film adaptation ==
On 4 January 2005, Gregor Johnson was hired to direct a feature film adaptation of The Tripods and rewrite the screenplay for Don Murphy & Touchstone Pictures. In 2009, Alex Proyas was hired to direct a feature film adaptation of The Tripods and Stuart Hazeldine would write the screenplay starting with The White Mountains.
