= Rupert and Buckley =

British clothing brand headquartered in Bath, Somerset

- Type: Private
- Industry: Fashion; Clothing; Apparel
- Genre: Retail
- Founded: 2011 (Canterbury, Kent)
- Founder: James Buckley-Thorp
- Headquarters: Barnstaple, United Kingdom,
- Area served: United Kingdom; Europe; Ireland; United States; China
- Key people: Alexander Newman
- Products: Clothing and Accessories
- Revenue: ▼£3,000,000 (2017)
- Number of employees: 7
- Website: rupertandbuckley.com

Rupert and Buckley was a British University derived clothing brand with its brand headquartered in Barnstaple, Devon.

== History ==
The company was founded in 2011 by James Buckley-Thorp whilst at the University of Kent where he was reading Law.

Having previously sold items in other outlets, the company opened its first own shop in Bath. In November 2013 the fashion label launched its "Brand Ambassador Scheme".

In early 2014, 25% of the company was sold to private investor Nigel Robinson.

On 5 November 2016, Rupert and Buckley opened their new store in the city centre of Oxford. The opening was supported by rising BBC Introducing star Chris Smee.

In January 2017 James Buckley-Thorp resigned as director and a new CEO was appointed. Mr Alexander Newman is the current CEO and sole director of Rupert and Buckley LTD.

On 9 October 2017, Rupert and Buckley were announced as the Official leisurewear partner to The Boat Race, for a period of 3 years. Supply the teams with all their off water apparel.

In May 2019 the company entered in to a Company Voluntary Arrangement (CVA) with its creditors, and in August 2022 the company began liquidation, owing over £3.3m to creditors

== Branding and Products ==
The brand name was a combination of the founder's surname and the name he'd like to call his first child. The company incorporated aspects of British heritage and sporting design in its products, and used a deep purple and dark yellow colour scheme for its packaging and in some of its products. The fashion label described itself as grassroots university derived styling and the image and style of the branding was for the university market.
