= Youd =

Youd is an English surname mostly found in Cheshire and Flintshire.

Over 40 variants of the surname were recorded in the 16th and 17th century, some examples are: Yewd, Yeud, Yeoud, Yowd, Yeowed, Yowood, Eude, Eaude, Ewd, Hude, Hewde etc.

Today only Youd, Youde, Eaude and Yould are in use.

The earliest record dates from 1427 and in 1562 the name appears in Little Budworth in Cheshire.

The Eaude variant is mostly found in Lancashire, its earliest record dates from 1679 when the name appears in Farnworth near Widnes, formerly in Lancashire.

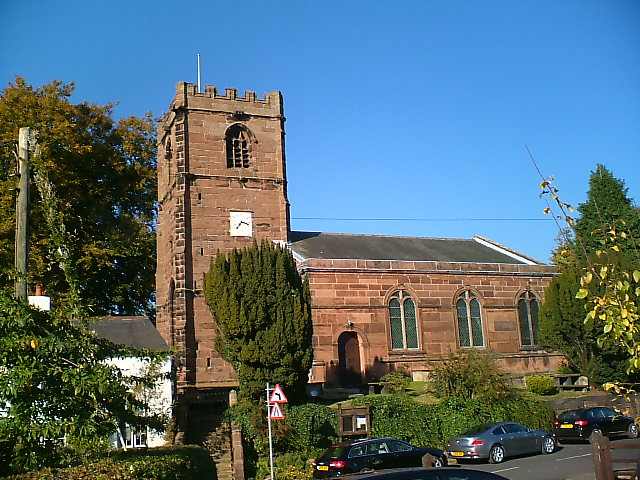
Little Budworth, St. Peter

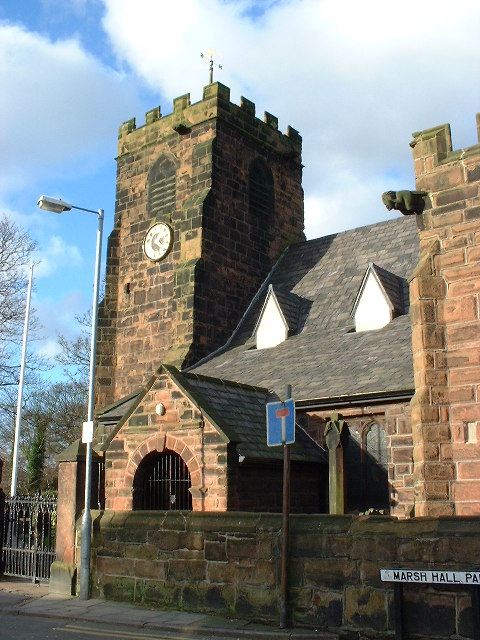
St Lukes C of E Church Farnworth Village

Currently little is known about the meaning or origin of this unusual and rare surname.

The surname then spread to nearby towns and villages in West Cheshire and Flintshire, becoming relatively numerous in Frodsham, Hawarden, Oscroft, Kinnerton, Chester and eventually established in Liverpool from about 1740. The Eaude variant spelling is found in Farnworth, Winwick, Warrington and Wigan, all within Lancashire.

670 people named Youd lived in England & Wales in 2002, together with 227 Youde, 104 Yould and 11 Eaude, according to figures from the Office for National Statistics.

The surname has now spread to many parts of the British Isles and through emigration also to USA, Canada, Australia and New Zealand.

== People with surname Youd, Youde, Yould, Eaude ==
- Sam Youd (1922–2012), British science fiction writer, best known by his pseudonym John Christopher
- T. Leslie Youd (born 1939), American geotechnical engineer
- Edward Youde (1924–1986), British diplomat, Governor of Hong Kong 1982–1986
