= Dragon Dance (novel) =

1986 novel by Samuel Youd

- First edition
- Author: John Christopher
- Language: English
- Series: Fireball
- Genre: Alternative history
- Publisher: Viking Kestrel
- Publication date: 1986
- Publication place: United Kingdom
- Media type: Print
- Pages: 127 pp
- ISBN: 0-14-032056-3
- Preceded by: New Found Land

Dragon Dance is a young adult alternative history novel by John Christopher. The last novel of the Fireball trilogy, it was first published in 1986.

== Plot summary ==
At the end of New Found Land, Simon and Brad are in North America where they are captured by sailors from the Far East.

When they awaken after losing consciousness during the capture, they find themselves aboard a Chinese junk crossing the Pacific Ocean. The junk is a paddle steamer that sails without human intervention. The crew have apparently put themselves into hibernation, indicating that they are accustomed to the trip and are expecting an uneventful journey.

On their arrival in China they are taken to the Imperial Court, where the boys display their knowledge of modern technology. They are befriended by the young emperor, Cho-tsing, but sent away later at the command of the Dowager Regent. They are then taken in by Bei Pen, a follower of the laws of Bei-Kun. There, Brad becomes besotted with Bei Pen's companion Li Mei and becomes estranged from Simon.

Unlike the other civilizations that they have encountered, which remain at a pre-Dark Ages technological level, the Chinese have continued their technological innovations and have come up with new inventions, even though their social development has stagnated.

Simon is sent to the north to serve the general of the powerful Northern Army in charge of resisting nomadic barbarians.

The arrival of the boys catalyses the ongoing court intrigue between the dowager regent and court officials. A series of bad news arrives in the north from the capital which implies that the young emperor is being held incommunicado, or has been secretly deposed and killed by Lord Yuan Chu, a courtier with designs on the throne.

The general of the Northern Army, the most powerful army in the empire publicly declares that the dowager regent as an usurper, and mobilizes his army to rescue the emperor, whose fate is unknown. He candidly admits to Simon that should the emperor be dead, that he would be the most likely to succeed to the throne.

Simon attempts to help the general by the introduction of armored tanks, but lacks detailed knowledge. Nonetheless Chinese engineers in the service of the general are able to build on the concept to produce some prototypes.

The Chinese themselves use flying kites to give the appearance that dragons are aiding their military, adding to their knowledge of the workings of the mind in a form of subtle hypnosis. However, the expedition becomes a disaster at the gates of the capital. Simon discovers that Brad has introduced airplanes to the military forces. While the airplanes work, Simon's tanks do not. Lord Yuan emerges as emperor, kills the dowager regent and has the deposed emperor executed. His ascent has been aided by Li Mei, who used her hypnotic abilities to keep Brad under control. Brad eventually sees her for what she is when she refuses to intervene in Cho-Tsing's execution, but she has him imprisoned.

The two boys manage to escape once again, staying with Bei-Pen. They discover that he is the original Bei-Kun, known in their home universe as Roger Bacon who escaped from Rome in the late 13th century to whet his knowledge with the Chinese and manages to live for seven hundred years, forming the Laws of Bei-Kun and a large following. He reveals that he has the knowledge to send them both home.

Though he is given the option to go home, Simon follows Brad when the latter refuses to go home and instead decides to try for better luck in a new realm.
