= The Death of Grass =

1956 science fiction novel

The Death Of Grass
- First edition
- Author: John Christopher
- Cover artist: Trevor Denning
- Language: English
- Genre: Science fiction
- Publisher: Michael Joseph
- Publication date: 1956 (UK)
- Publication place: United Kingdom
- Media type: Print (Hardcover)
- Pages: 231
- OCLC: 2160136

The Death of Grass (US title No Blade of Grass) is a 1956 post-apocalyptic science fiction novel written by the English author Sam Youd under the pen name John Christopher. The plot concerns a virus that kills off grass species, including rice and wheat. The Death of Grass was the first of several post-apocalyptic novels written by Youd. The novel was written in a matter of weeks and liberated him from his day job.

It was published in the United States both in book form and serialized in The Saturday Evening Post, as No Blade of Grass; supposedly the US publisher thought the original title "sounded like something out of a gardening catalogue". Its publication in The Saturday Evening Post provoked considerable reaction amongst its readers on account of its portrayal of government's response to the unfolding worldwide crisis. The film rights were sold to MGM; the 1970 film, No Blade of Grass, was produced and directed by Cornel Wilde.

== Plot ==
A new virus strain, called the "Chung-Li virus", has infected rice crops in East Asia causing massive famine; the virus is also revealed to be found in the UK but because of its selectivity does not affect the country's agriculture. After the introduction of a new pesticide, developed in preference to breeding resistant crops, a mutated virus appears and infects the staple crops of West Asia and Europe such as wheat and barley—all of the grasses (thus the novel's title). It threatens a famine engulfing the whole of the Old World, while Australasia and the Americas attempt to impose rigorous quarantine to keep the virus out.

The novel follows the struggles of engineer John Custance and his friend, civil servant Roger Buckley, as, along with their families, they make their way across an England which is rapidly descending into anarchy, hoping to reach the safety of John's brother's potato farm in an isolated Westmorland valley. Buckley, having advance warning of the government's plot to hydrogen bomb major cities, alerts Custance to evacuate. Picking up a travelling companion, a gun shop owner named Pirrie, after an attempt to procure arms, they find that they must sacrifice many of the aspects of the morality they held before the famine in order to stay alive.

Before reaching the valley, John takes in a large group of peaceful survivors. The group later survives encounters with soldiers attacking a farmhouse. After arriving at the valley, they find that John's brother is unable to let them all in to the heavily defended valley. Pirrie prevents John from taking only his immediate family into the valley; instead, the group takes the valley by force. Pirrie and John's brother are killed; John takes possession of the valley.

== Adaptations ==
A dramatised version was broadcast on BBC radio in 1957. Another adaptation for the BBC World Service was broadcast in 1986.

A film adaptation, No Blade of Grass (1970), was produced and directed by Cornel Wilde.

In 2009, as part of a BBC Radio 4 science fiction season, the station broadcast a drama in five episodes, based on the novel and narrated by David Mitchell.
