= Alick Rowe =

Alick Rowe (1938 – 30 October 2009) was a British writer.

Born in Hereford, he spent the first 16 years of his life living in a pub (something he would later write about in his book Boy at the Commercial). After being educated at Hereford Cathedral School, where he was Head Boy, he matriculated to and graduated from St Catharine's College, Cambridge, returning to Hereford Cathedral School as a drama and English teacher. He began writing radio plays in his spare time, and was eventually hired full-time by the BBC. His productions for them included Crisp and Even Brightly (a comedic retelling of the story of Good King Wenceslas) and Operation Lightning Pegasus (which covered the Siege of Troy).

Outside radio he wrote several books and television productions, including The Prime of Miss Jean Brodie in 1978 for STV, The Tripods for the BBC, and winning a BAFTA in 1993.

== Child sexual assault conviction and move to Thailand ==
In 1998 he was jailed for sexually assaulting a choirboy, moving to Thailand on his release. He died in Chiang Mai of a suspected heart attack on 30 October 2009.
