= The Guardians (Christopher novel) =

1970 novel by John Christopher

- Front cover of first edition
- Author: John Christopher
- Cover artist: Trevor Stubley
- Language: English
- Genre: Children's soft science fiction, dystopian novel
- Publisher: Hamish Hamilton
- Publication date: 1970
- Publication place: United Kingdom
- Pages: 156 (first edition)
- ISBN: 0-241-01795-5
- OCLC: 10718971
- Dewey Decimal: 823/.9/14
- LC Class: PZ7.C457 Gu3

The Guardians is a young-adult science fiction novel written by John Christopher and published by Hamilton in 1970.

Set in the year 2052, it depicts an authoritarian England divided into two distinct societies: the modern, overpopulated "Conurbs" and the aristocratic, rarefied "County". Crowded city districts and all-pervasive technology make up the Conurbs while manors and rolling countrysides typical of 19th-century England make up the County. The story follows a young Conurban orphan named Rob as he experiences life in both worlds, uncovering truths and choosing sides in the process.

Christopher (Sam Youd) and The Guardians won the annual Guardian Children's Fiction Prize from The Guardian newspaper, coincidentally, which is judged by a panel of British children's writers. In 1976 he won the Deutscher Jugendliteraturpreis in category youth fiction for the German-language edition, Die Wächter.

In 1986 the German TV station ARD broadcast a film adaptation under that title.

== Plot summary ==
=== Escape ===
Following the suspicious death of his father, 13-year-old Rob Randall is sent to a State boarding school, where harsh disciplinary measures and hazing by seniors soon make life intolerable. In his desperation, Rob devises a plan of escaping to the County, reasoning that he will avoid detection there much more easily than anywhere in the Conurbs. He is further driven by the fact that his mother was also from the County, and had herself crossed over into the Conurbs to be with his father.

Slipping out and making his way to Reading, Rob comes up against the Barrier dividing the Conurbs from the County adjacent. The Barrier proves much less of a challenge than popular rumour suggests, and, finding a spot at which he is able to dig a gap underneath, Rob crosses over into the County. He takes in his expansive surroundings as he continues north-west but does not manage a long distance before he is noticed. A figure on a horse spots him and gives chase, catching up quickly as Rob twists his foot running.

The rider turns out to be a boy perhaps a year or less older than Rob himself. He appears to be sympathetic to Rob's plight and, introducing himself as Mike Gifford, tends to the blisters on Rob's feet before taking him to a nearby cave where he can rest in concealment. Mike attempts to make the cave more hospitable by appropriating food, blankets and such from the Gifford household, but these discrepancies are eventually noticed by the housekeeper and reported to Mike's mother, whose suspicion is also aroused by Mike's staying out longer. She finds the cave and confronts Rob.

Uncertain about how to proceed, Mrs Gifford allows Rob to remain in the cave one more night. The following morning, both Mike and Mrs Gifford visit the cave and speak to Rob; Mrs Gifford proposes that, as he will not willingly return to the Conurbs, and as Mike is determined to help him, the only plausible option is to fit Rob into the family. So, declaring him a relative raised in Nepal and playing out his supposed arrival from the nearest station, Rob is inducted into the Gifford family.

=== A new life ===
Changing his surname from Randall to Perrott, Rob does his best to adapt to life in the Gifford house, getting to know Mr Gifford and the servants, as well as Cecily, Mike's younger sister. Cecily is not told Rob's story, as it is feared that she is too young to keep the secret safely. Rob is taught various skills such as horse-riding to help him blend in with County society. These skills are put to the test when the Giffords hold a garden party and Rob is questioned by Sir Percy Gregory and an elderly man named Harcourt. Under the stress, Rob fears his answers are unconvincing; but Harcourt dismisses Rob's mannerisms as typical of a "Nepalese settler".

Several months pass and Rob becomes increasingly confident and assured of his position, even going so far as to win third place in the archery contest of the year, beating Mike who comes in eleventh. Rob joins Mike at school; though he notices Mike's attitude toward him has changed. Mike brings Rob to a gathering held by a senior boy named Daniel Penfold, where a heated discussion on both the failings and the merits of the current social system ensues. While most of the boys present laugh it off, Rob notices Mike does not. Later, Mike shares with Rob his knowledge of a gang of organised revolutionaries and hints that Rob should join. Rob refuses, both on principle and for fear of his secret being divulged.

Christmas arrives and Rob celebrates it in the way of the County gentry. Mrs Gifford speaks to him about his good progress at school, noting that Mike is not doing as well. As Mike and Rob are about to visit the Penfold family, she also raises her suspicions about Mike's dealings with them, especially with the older Penfold boy, Roger, whose Army record is not entirely clean. The visit passes largely uneventfully for Rob, in spite of Roger Penfold's somewhat seditious talk during dinner. On the ride home, Mike and Rob again fall to arguing over the state of affairs; Mike declares that he probably would not have been interested in these issues if he had not run across Rob.

=== The revolt ===
Another school term passes. One Friday, Mike pulls out of a planned fishing trip with Rob, saying that he must ride to Oxford to see about a horse. Several hours later, news arrives that a rebellion has begun and that both Oxford and Bristol have been taken by armed rebels. Rob returns in haste to the Giffords' where Mrs Gifford demands he tell her what he knows about Mike's involvement. He does, and she rebukes him angrily, reminding him of Mike's kindness to him when he was in need. Ashamed, Rob prepares to ride out to meet a band of vigilantes countering the insurrection, but Mrs Gifford asks him to stay as all the men of the house have already ridden out.

The next morning, Mr. Gifford and his men return to the house; the revolt had been put down without their aid. The younger Penfold is said to have been killed and there is no news of Mike, though his name is not on the incomplete list of dead and wounded. That night, Mike steals into the house and visits Rob, unbeknownst to the family. It is his last visit; he is fully aware of his status as a fugitive and realises that his involvement in the revolt means that he can no longer remain in the County. He declares his intention to cross the Barrier into the Conurbs, where the movement has "friends". Rob tries to dissuade him and threatens to raise the alarm but is restrained by the thought that Mike had not turned him in when he had been in a similar position. Mike gives Rob an address in the Conurb where he can be found, should he change his mind and decide to join him. They shake hands and he rides out.

The next day, a patrol stops at the Gifford house with orders to escort Rob for questioning. Rob's initial apprehensions about this are calmed when he is taken not to law enforcement but to Old Hall, Sir Percy Gregory's home. Over coffee and cherry cake, Rob recounts his old Nepal backstory again in response to Sir Percy's prompting questions. Sir Percy, however, shocks him when complimenting him by using his real surname. It becomes clear that Rob's true identity has been known to him, and the authorities have tolerated his presence in the County. Using this as leverage, Sir Percy attempts to manipulate Rob into informing. Rob tells him everything except for Mike's late-night visit and the secret address; this seems to satisfy Sir Percy. Disturbingly, Sir Percy tells Rob of what is to be done with Mike if he is found: a certain surgical procedure on the brain which renders the subject docile and obedient. He also tells Rob of the secret group of overseers responsible for the present system (the titular "Guardians") and, having appraised the intelligence and initiative Rob has shown in coming this far, offers to recruit him.

=== Epiphany ===
Rob returns home by evening. Mrs Gifford tells him that she is aware of Mike's visit the night previous – having again noted the absence of some household articles, such as food and clothing – and again rebukes Rob for not doing what she feels would have been the right thing. To justify himself, Rob explains about the operation that would have been performed on Mike had he turned him in. Mrs Gifford reveals that she knows of this, and that Mr Gifford himself had been subject to it; hence his preoccupation with bonsai and little else.

This revelation causes an epiphany for Rob Perrott. He realises that Mike had inherited a spirit of freedom from his father, and though his father had been forced into submission, Mike had not grown up entirely blind to the oppression around him. Rob also realises that he had almost bought into the groupthink himself by assimilating into the gentry with such determination that he had forgotten his Conurban past, even taking up the offer to join the Guardians. He makes a decision: either he can remain in the place he has won in County society, now in perfect safety, or he can join the movement which has fled to the Conurbs and struggle alongside Mike in liberating the masses.

The story closes with Rob leaving the Giffords at night and returning to the Barrier, trowel in hand.
