= The World in Winter =

1962 novel by Samuel Youd

- First edition
- Author: John Christopher
- Language: English
- Genre: Science fiction
- Publisher: Eyre & Spottiswoode
- Publication date: 1962
- Publication place: United Kingdom
- Pages: 253

The World in Winter (US title The Long Winter) is a 1962 post-apocalyptic science fiction novel by British writer John Christopher. It deals with a new ice age caused by a reduction in the output of the Sun.

== Plot summary ==
The story involves a new ice age hitting Europe, British refugees fleeing to Nigeria, and what a later group find when they return.

As the story opens, Andrew Leedon, a London-based television documentary producer, is given a new story to research: an Italian scientist, Fratellini, has proposed an imminent fall in solar radiation for the forthcoming few years which may lead to harsher winters. Leedon meets with David Cartwell, a Home Office civil servant and useful source, to see if he can find out more. Cartwell quickly becomes a close friend of Leedon, but also begins an affair with Leedon's wife, Carol.

The winter of that year is, as predicted, long and harsh, but by January is it becoming clear to insiders that the solar downturn is worse than Fratellini had calculated and no upturn is in sight. By March, food stocks are becoming dangerously low, rationing has been imposed and the Government imposes martial law. Those in the know, including Andrew's estranged wife, sell up and move south to the tropics and countries such as Nigeria. Leedon stays behind, as inner London is finally cordoned off from the rest of the UK to protect the seat of power – an area called the London Pale – as the rest of the country is abandoned to starvation and barbarism.

Finally Leedon is persuaded both by Carol and by David Cartwell to exit the country while safe passage is still possible. Taking with him Cartwell's wife Madeleine, he moves to Lagos in Nigeria, finding that the tables have now turned – white refugees fleeing from the ice-bound northern countries are living in slums, unemployed or with only menial jobs, and penniless, as African governments have withdrawn recognition of currencies such as Sterling and no longer recognize the British Government, with reason, as it no longer exercises sovereignty over its own land.

A ray of hope arrives for Leedon as Abonitu, a young Nigerian whom Leedon had treated with kindness and generosity one evening in London, finds him and in turn helps him and Madeleine out of the slum. Abonitu plans a reconnaissance expedition back to Britain.
