= After Armageddon =

2010 television show

After Armageddon is a 2010 History docudrama about the travails of survivors after a deadly global pandemic that first aired on January 6, 2010.

== Plot ==
The plot centers around the Johnson family (consisting of Chris (Rob Hartz) and Ellen (Kathleen Cameron) Johnson, and their son Casey (Hy Rillero)) of Los Angeles, California, one of a small number of families to survive a global pandemic that, according to the opening of the film, occurs "sometime in the future..." The disease began as a particularly virulent flu strain in Southeast Asia. Efforts made to contain the virus in that portion of the world are ineffective as global transportation networks carry infected individuals all around the world. Hospitals become overloaded, and the public works infrastructure begins to shut down. Eventually, the main characters leave L.A., encountering many hardships along the way. They make it to a friendly small town, where life begins again.

Interspersed with the above are interviews with various experts giving their perspective on what is most likely to occur in a global pandemic scenario.

== Cast ==
- Rob Hartz as Chris Johnson
- Kathleen Cameron as Ellen Johnson
- Hy Rillero as Casey Johnson
