= The Bed-Sitting Room =

The Bed-Sitting Room can refer to:

- a typically British expression denoting a small residence comprising primarily a combined bedroom & sitting room, also known as a bedsit.
- The Bedsitting Room (play), a play by Spike Milligan and John Antrobus
- The Bed Sitting Room (film), a film based on the play
