= Dirty War (film) =

2004 British drama TV film by Daniel Percival

- Genre: Thriller
- Written by: Daniel Percival; Lizzie Mickery
- Directed by: Daniel Percival
- Starring: Louise Delamere; Alastair Galbraith; Waleed Elgadi; Martin Savage; Koel Purie; Helen Schlesinger; Ewan Stewart; Paul Antony-Barber
- Theme music composer: Joe Walker
- Country of origin: United Kingdom
- Original language: English

Production
- Executive producers: Liza Marshall; David M. Thompson; Paul Woolwich
- Producer: Luke Alkin
- Cinematography: Graham Smith
- Editor: Melanie Oliver
- Running time: 90 minutes
- Production company: HBO Films

Original release
- Network: BBC One
- Release: 26 September 2004

Dirty War is a British television drama film, co-written by Lizzie Mickery and Daniel Percival and directed by Percival that was broadcast on BBC One on 26 September 2004. The film, produced in association with HBO Films, follows a terrorist attack on Central London where a "dirty bomb" is deployed. Principal cast members for the film include Louise Delamere, Alastair Galbraith, Waleed Elagdi, Martin Savage, Koel Purie, Helen Schlesinger, Ewan Stewart and Paul Antony-Barber.

Following its broadcast in the UK, a live questions & answers session with the writers of the programme broadcast on BBC One at 22:50 GMT. In the United States, the film was made available on HBO on 24 January 2005, and the broadcast for the first time on PBS on 23 February 2005. The film was later released on DVD in the United States on October 6, 2005. Percival later won a BAFTA Award for Best New Director for his work on the film.

== Plot ==
An Islamist terror cell plans to detonate dirty bombs in Central London. Vegetable oil imports from Turkey are used to smuggle radioactive material into the city which is then combined with other bomb components to make two devices. Anti-Terrorist Branch officers DI Justin Lane, DS Mike Drummer, and DC Sameena Habibullah lead the police investigation to stop the attack under the supervision of DI Lance Brook and DAC John Ives. Minister for London Nicola Painswick publicly claims that the emergency services are well prepared to deal with a terrorist CBRN attack; following a training exercise that was seen at the start of the film, senior emergency workers including LFB Watch Commander Murray Corrigan believe that their training and equipment is actually inadequate, but their concerns are dismissed.

Despite some terrorists being arrested, a van carrying one bomb is still detonated in front of Liverpool Street station, causing immediate casualties as well as starting a fire and releasing high amounts of radiation. Murray's firefighters are among those responding to the scene but are forced to pull back after their dosimeters pick up the rapidly spreading radiation. As Gold Commander Paul Hardwick tries to deal with the incident, Ives reviews CCTV footage to track down the other bomb as well as the ringleader of the cell, Ahmed Ibrahim Abassi, who exited the van as it entered the London ring of steel. Drummer and Habibullah take measures (including torture) to determine Abassi's location and prevent the second attack; they learn the licence plate number of a second van, which Ives tracks down to Westminster, and the location of a second terrorist hideout which Drummer and Habibullah raid. A SO19 team thwarts the attempted detonation of the second bomb.

Emergency services dealing with the aftermath of the first bomb establish decontamination units but find it difficult to deal with the angry and fearful crowds eager to exit the hot zone. They also struggle to contain the fire which is spreading uncontrollably after the initial LFB response was withdrawn. Murray's firefighters don CBRN equipment and return to the hot zone. However, radiation has now started to affect East End neighbourhoods, prompting a further retreat by the emergency services. Murray, frustrated at the lack of support and wanting to carry on fighting the fire and rescuing survivors, defies the evacuation order, removing his suit as he does so.

Two weeks later, Drummer and Habibullah interrogate an apprehended Abassi. They inform him that Pakistan's ISI have arrested his wife and that, with no other family to look after him, his son is now in an orphanage. Habibullah, who the film had earlier established as being Muslim, attempts to appeal to Abassi on religious grounds but he reiterates his devotion to jihad against the West. Murray has survived being exposed to the radiation but his wife is informed that he may face major health problems in the future including cancer and loss of fertility. A radio broadcast states that 375 people were killed in the attack, with some experts predicting thousands of long-term deaths from cancer, and that the radiation risk means parts of Central and East London will remain closed for up to thirty years, with the local economy suffering accordingly.

== Cast ==
- Louise Delamere as Liz Corrigan
- Alastair Galbraith as Murray Corrigan
- Waleed Elgadi as Abu Abassi
- Martin Savage as Detective Sergeant Mike Drummer
- Koel Purie as Detective Constable Sameena Habibullah
- Helen Schlesinger as Nicola Painswick
- Ewan Stewart as Deputy Assistant Commissioner John Ives
- Paul Antony-Barber as Commander Paul Hardwick
- Louise Breckon-Richards as Detective Constable Vicky Loman
- Kameal Nisha Bisnauthsingh as Razla
- Shamshad Akhtar as Falzah
- Fuman Dar as Mohammed Ibn Harrara
- Houda Echouafni as Fatima
- George Georgiou as Usman Selcuk
- Dorian Healy as Harper
- David Horovitch as Lambert
- Amar Hussain as Imran Nazir
- Raza Jaffrey as Rashid Dhar
- Hosh Kane as Yousef Ghamidi
- Narinder Samra as Barber Asharf
- Jonty Stephens as Detective Inspector Justin Lane
- Joe Tucker as Detective Inspector Lance Brook
- Graeme Ford as Detective Constable Chris Scott
- Paul Maddaford as Detective Constable Richard Phillips

== Production ==
Percival was tasked with creating the film by BBC executives, whose outline for the project was "think about what the new generation of terrorism actually meant". Percival stated that "The challenge of Dirty War was to tell the story of the attack from the intimate perspective of several different characters. We want to get the messages of this film to the widest possible audience."

Mickery was asked if she would like to co-write the script. She said of her contribution; "I think drama has the capacity to touch more people. If you are caught up in the emotions of the characters involved - and not just the statistics - the effect it has on you will last longer and be more intimate. Dirty War's aim is to try to make sense of the situation we all face, to ask questions on our behalf, and most importantly, to move us."

The film took eighteen months to produce with the basic scenario being based on "extensive" research. It was decided at an early stage that the film should not feature any major actors in order not to detract from the storyline.

MillTv was involved with the film's special effects.

== See also ==
- Other fiction about nuclear and radiological attacks on Britain
  - The Bedsitting Room, a 1962 satirical play about the short-term aftermath of a nuclear attack which received a film adaptation in 1969
  - The War Game, a 1966 film about a nuclear attack and its short-term aftermath which, like Dirty War, was produced by the BBC
  - Riddley Walker, a 1980 novel taking place some two thousand years after a nuclear war and set in what used to be Kent
  - When the Wind Blows, a 1982 graphic novel about a nuclear attack as experienced by a retired couple which received an animated adaptation in 1986
  - Z for Zachariah, a 1984 BBC Play for Today adaptation of the 1974 novel about a girl's survival in the aftermath of a nuclear war; the Play for Today adaptation takes place in Wales rather than the original novel's United States setting
  - Brother in the Land, a 1984 novel about a boy's struggle for survival in the aftermath of a nuclear attack
  - Threads, a 1984 film about a nuclear attack and its long-term aftermath which, like Dirty War, was produced by the BBC
- Terrorism in the United Kingdom#Islamist
- Preparing for Emergencies, an emergency preparedness campaign that began in the same year as Dirty War and is indirectly referred to during the film
- London Emergency Services Liaison Panel
