= The War Game =

1965 pseudo-documentary TV film by Peter Watkins

- Directed by: Peter Watkins
- Written by: Peter Watkins
- Produced by: Peter Watkins
- Narrated by: Michael Aspel; Peter Graham
- Cinematography: Peter Bartlett; Peter Suschitzky (uncredited)
- Edited by: Michael Bradsell
- Production company: BBC
- Distributed by: British Film Institute
- Release date: 13 April 1966
- Running time: 47 minutes
- Country: United Kingdom
- Language: English

The War Game is a 1965 British pseudo-documentary film that depicts a nuclear war and its aftermath. Written, directed and produced by Peter Watkins for the BBC, it caused dismay within the BBC and within government and was withdrawn before the provisional screening date of 6 October 1965. The corporation said that "the effect of the film has been judged by the BBC to be too horrifying for the medium of broadcasting. It will, however, be shown to invited audiences..."

The film premiered at the National Film Theatre in London, on 13 April 1966, where it ran until 3 May. It was then shown abroad at several film festivals, including Venice, where it won the Special Prize. It won the Academy Award for Best Documentary Feature in 1967.

The film was eventually televised in Great Britain on 31 July 1985, during the week before the 40th anniversary of the Hiroshima bombing, the day before a repeat screening of Threads.

== Synopsis ==
The film begins by describing Britain's nuclear deterrence policy of threatening would-be aggressors with devastation from the Royal Air Force's nuclear-armed V bombers. Due to the number of V bomber bases (particularly in a crisis situation that would see them dispersed throughout Britain), as well as major civilian targets in cities, Britain is described as having more potential nuclear weapon targets by area than any other country.

On 15 September, American forces in South Vietnam are authorised to use tactical nuclear weapons in response to an ongoing Chinese invasion. The Soviet Union and East Germany threaten to invade West Berlin if America does not change course. The next day, the British government declares a state of emergency and transfers responsibility for Britain's day-to-day running to a body of regional commissioners. The first task of newly established emergency committees is the mass evacuation of children, mothers, and the infirm to various safe areas including Kent. Under threat of imprisonment, homeowners accommodate the evacuees, while unoccupied properties are requisitioned by the government. Rationing is implemented, booklets on how to prepare for nuclear attack are distributed, and emergency sirens are tested, with these being estimated to provide around three minutes' warning until impact, or under 30 seconds in the case of submarine attack. There are no government-built shelters and efforts to build private ones are soon frustrated by a shortage of construction supplies.

On 18 September the Soviets and East Germans invade West Berlin as previously threatened. NATO launches a counterattack, which is quickly overrun, resulting in the use of American tactical nuclear weapons. The Soviets immediately launch their own nuclear weapons at strategic targets, as their above-ground liquid-fuelled missiles are highly vulnerable to a NATO first strike.

In Kent a one-megaton warhead that overshoots RAF Manston explodes in an air burst six miles from Canterbury, causing the city to be struck by the intense heat given off by the blast. At one house a defence worker and a boy in the yard are struck by the heat wave, causing their eyeballs to melt. Furniture inside the house catches fire, causing those inside to panic as they attempt to put the flames out. Twelve seconds later the building is destroyed by the incoming shockwave. At another house a boy suffers flash blindness as a consequence of looking directly at an explosion 27 miles away; his father carries him inside and hides with the rest of his family under a table as the house is shaken by the distant shockwaves of successive explosions. In Rochester, an airburst causes a firestorm, which sets the town ablaze. Meanwhile British V bombers enter Soviet airspace to inflict similar devastation.

The attack overwhelms Kent's emergency services, with each surviving doctor being faced with at least 350 casualties. The worst-affected victims are left to die alone or shot by police as a form of mercy killing. Cases of PTSD occur among the survivors of the attacks. Bodies are disposed of by being burned; to prevent relatives from interfering, destroyed areas are sealed off, and police are routinely armed. Radiation sickness is rampant and essential supplies and utilities are non-existent or severely limited.

The majority of Britain's remaining food supplies are reserved for those maintaining law and order, causing riots to break out over access to resources. The riots soon turn into armed skirmishes between the authorities and desperate civilians; the latter are shown seizing a truck carrying a shipment of weapons and a food warehouse. Elsewhere individuals convicted of causing civil disturbance or obstructing government officers are executed by police firing squads, with the father of the blinded boy from earlier in the film among those shot. Due to food shortages, scurvy emerges as a consequence of a lack of easily available vitamin C.

On Christmas Day in a Dover refugee facility children orphaned in the attack are asked what they want to be when they grow up; they either "don't want to be nothing" or simply remain silent. Another child is described as having only seven bedridden years to live before dying from a chronic illness resembling leukaemia, and a pregnant woman who was exposed to radiation is unsure if she will suffer stillbirth. In closing, the real-world press is described as saying nothing about the dangers of nuclear weaponry. Over the closing credits, one can hear a damaged recording of the Christmas hymn "Silent Night".

== Style ==
The story is told in the style of a news magazine programme. It wavers between a pseudo-documentary and a drama film, with characters acknowledging the presence of the camera crew in some segments and others (in particular the nuclear attack) filmed as if the camera was not present. The combination of elements also qualifies it as a mondo film. It features several different strands that alternate throughout, including a documentary-style chronology of the main events, featuring reportage-like images of the war, the nuclear strikes, and their effects on civilians; brief contemporary interviews, in which passers-by are interviewed about what turns out to be their general lack of knowledge of nuclear war issues; optimistic commentary from public figures that clashes with the other images in the film; and fictional interviews with key figures as the war unfolds.

The film has a voice-over narration that describes the events depicted as plausible occurrences during and after a nuclear war. The narrator seeks to convince the viewing audience that the civil defence policies of 1965 have not realistically prepared the public for such events, particularly suggesting that the policies neglected the possibility of panic buying that would occur for building materials to construct improvised fallout shelters.

The public are generally depicted as lacking all understanding of nuclear matters with the exception of a character with a double-barrelled shotgun who successfully implemented the contemporary civil defence advice and heavily sandbagged his home. The film does not focus on individual experiences but rather the collective British population, who rely on government preparations and are not fully convinced of the dangers of nuclear war until the final hours before the attack.

The film often invokes historical mass casualty situations in relation to its portrayal of a post-attack situation; for example, the collection of wedding rings from dead bodies to aid their later identification is explicitly linked to a similar practice seen after the 1945 bombing of Dresden, while the atomic bombings of Hiroshima and Nagasaki are regularly cited when discussing the physical and mental decline of survivors.

Of his intent, Watkins said:

... Interwoven among scenes of "reality" were stylized interviews with a series of "establishment figures" – an Anglican Bishop, a nuclear strategist, etc. The outrageous statements by some of these people (including the Bishop) – in favour of nuclear weapons, even nuclear war – were actually based on genuine quotations. Other interviews with a doctor, a psychiatrist, etc. were more sober, and gave details of the effects of nuclear weapons on the human body and mind. In this film I was interested in breaking the illusion of media-produced "reality". My question was – "Where is 'reality'? ... in the madness of statements by these artificially-lit establishment figures quoting the official doctrine of the day, or in the madness of the staged and fictional scenes from the rest of my film, which presented the consequences of their utterances?

To this end, the docudrama employs juxtaposition by, for example, quickly cutting from the scenes of horror after an immediate escalation from military to city nuclear attacks to a snippet of a recording of a calm lecture by a person resembling Herman Kahn, a renowned RAND strategist, hypothesising that a third world war would not necessarily escalate to a stage involving "the ultimate destruction of cities" and, indeed, that stopping the conflict before then would give the belligerents around ten years of post-war recovery in which to prepare for the next five world wars. The effect of this juxtaposition is to make the speaker appear out of touch with the "reality" of rapid escalation and of the likelihood of cities being utterly destroyed as depicted immediately before his contribution. Similarly, the film briefly cuts away from the destruction inflicted on Canterbury to show a textual statement by two bishops from the Vatican's ecumenical council who argue that the faithful "should learn to live with, though need not love, the nuclear bomb, provided that it is 'clean' and of a good family", before then cutting back to Canterbury's fate, while a spoken statement by an Anglican bishop about his continued belief in "a system of necessary law and order [and] in the war of the just" is immediately followed by a scene of a family burning to death in their car during the Rochester firestorm.

== Production ==
The film was shot in the Kent towns of Tonbridge, Gravesend, Chatham and Dover. The cast was almost entirely made up of amateur and non-actors, as was Watkins' preference, casting having taken place via a series of public meetings several months earlier; more than 350 actors would ultimately take part in the production. Much of the filming of the post-strike devastation was shot at the Grand Shaft Barracks, Dover. The narration was provided by Peter Graham, with Michael Aspel reading the quotations from source material.

== Release ==
After the Postmaster General ordered the BBC not to broadcast the film on television because of its theme content, as a compromise, the British Government allowed the film to be shown in public cinemas with the required certification.

After its cinema release in the United Kingdom and an airing at the New York Film Festival, Pathé Contemporary Films released The War Game in US cinemas in 1967. It subsequently did well as a non-theatrical release.

The War Game itself finally saw television broadcast in the United Kingdom on BBC2 on July 31, 1985, as part of a special season of programming entitled After the Bomb (which had been Watkins's original working title for The War Game). After the Bomb commemorated the 40th anniversary of the bombing of Hiroshima and Nagasaki. The broadcast was preceded by an introduction from Ludovic Kennedy.

On 27 August 1968 nearly 250 people at a peace rally in the Edwin Lewis Quadrangle in Philadelphia attended a screening of the film sponsored by the Pennsylvania Coalition. Like the United Kingdom, the film was also banned from National Educational Television in the United States owing to its theme.

== Reception and legacy ==
The film holds a Rotten Tomatoes rating of 93% based on 14 reviews, with an average score of 8.46/10.

After watching the film, Paul McCartney of the Beatles was quoted as saying "There are hundreds of films about which people say to you: 'You've GOT to see it!' Often, it's just a passing comment. But if anyone ever says this to you about The War Game, take them seriously. This picture is not just important. It's terrifying and urgent".

Roger Ebert gave the film a perfect score, calling it "[o]ne of the most skillful documentary films ever made." He praised the "remarkable authenticity" of the firestorm sequence and describes its portrayal of bombing's aftermath as "certainly the most horrifying ever put on film (although, to be sure, greater suffering has taken place in real life, and is taking place today)." "They should string up bedsheets between the trees and show "The War Game" in every public park" he concludes, "It should be shown on television, perhaps right after one of those half-witted war series in which none of the stars ever gets killed." David Cornelius of DVD Talk called it "one of the most disturbing, overwhelming, and downright important films ever produced." He writes that the film finds Watkins "at his very best, angry and provocative and desperate to tell the truth, yet not once dipping below anything but sheer greatness from a filmmaking perspective [...] an unquestionable masterpiece of raw journalism, political commentary, and unrestrained terror."

In the early 1980s, Watkins planned to create a modern remake of The War Game, to be filmed in Sheffield. However, the project never materialised. Later, Sheffield would be used as the setting and recording location for the 1984 anti-nuclear war BBC TV film Threads.

=== Accolades ===
The film won the 1967 Academy Award for Best Documentary Feature.

In a list of the 100 Greatest British Television Programmes drawn up by the British Film Institute in 2000, voted for by industry professionals, The War Game was placed 27th. The War Game was also voted 74th in Channel Four's 100 Greatest Scary Moments.

== See also ==
- Other fiction about nuclear and radiological attacks on Britain
  - The Bedsitting Room, a 1962 satirical play about the short-term aftermath of a nuclear attack which received a film adaptation in 1969
  - Riddley Walker, a 1980 novel taking place some two thousand years after a nuclear war and set in what used to be Kent
  - When the Wind Blows, a 1982 graphic novel about a nuclear attack as experienced by a retired couple, which received an animated adaptation in 1986
  - Z for Zachariah, a 1984 BBC Play for Today adaptation of the 1974 novel about a girl's survival in the aftermath of a nuclear war; the Play for Today adaptation takes place in Wales rather than the original novel's United States setting
  - Brother in the Land, a 1984 novel about a boy's struggle for survival in the aftermath of a nuclear attack
  - Threads, a 1984 film about a nuclear attack and its long-term aftermath which, like The War Game, was produced by the BBC
  - Dirty War, a 2004 film about a terrorist dirty bomb attack which, like The War Game, was produced by the BBC
- List of nuclear holocaust fiction
- Nuclear weapons and the United Kingdom
- Nuclear weapons in popular culture
- Survival film, about the film genre, with a list of related films
- The Day After, a 1983 US television film about nuclear war and its aftermath
- First Strike (1979 film)
- Special Bulletin, a 1983 US television film presented as a live newscast, about domestic terrorists who cause the nuclear destruction of a major US city and its aftermath
