= The Day After =

1983 American television film by Nicholas Meyer

- Genre: Drama; Disaster; Science fiction
- Written by: Edward Hume
- Directed by: Nicholas Meyer
- Starring: Jason Robards; JoBeth Williams; Steve Guttenberg; John Cullum; John Lithgow; Amy Madigan
- Theme music composer: David Raksin; Virgil Thomson (Theme for "The River")
- Country of origin: United States
- Original language: English

Production
- Producer: Robert Papazian
- Cinematography: Gayne Rescher
- Editors: William Paul Dornisch; Robert Florio
- Running time: 126 minutes
- Production company: ABC Circle Films

Original release
- Network: ABC
- Release: November 20, 1983

The Day After is a 1983 American television film directed by Nicholas Meyer. The film postulates a fictional conflict between NATO and the Warsaw Pact over Germany that rapidly escalates into a full-scale nuclear exchange between the United States and the Soviet Union. The action itself focuses on the residents of Lawrence, Kansas, and Kansas City, Missouri, and several family farms near American missile silos. The cast includes Jason Robards, JoBeth Williams, Steve Guttenberg, John Cullum, and John Lithgow. The film was written by Edward Hume and produced by Robert Papazian, with clips from the 1979 Air Force documentary First Strike used.

More than 100 million people, in nearly 39 million households, watched the film when it first aired on November 20, 1983, on the ABC television network, shortly after the 1983 Able Archer crisis which nearly caused a real nuclear war between the superpowers. With a 46 rating and a 62% share of the viewing audience during the initial broadcast, the film was the seventh-highest-rated non-sports show until then, and in a 2009 Nielsen TV Ratings list was one of the highest-rated television films in U.S. history.

The film was broadcast on Soviet state television in 1987, during the negotiations on Intermediate-Range Nuclear Forces Treaty. The producers demanded that the Russian translation conform to the original script and that the broadcast not be interrupted by commentary. The negotiations were completed in January 1987; the film first aired in the USSR on May 29, 1987.

== Plot ==
Dr. Russell Oakes works at a hospital in Kansas City, Missouri, and spends time with family as his daughter Marilyn prepares to move away. In nearby Harrisonville, farmer Jim Dahlberg and family hold a wedding rehearsal for his eldest daughter Denise. Airman Billy McCoy, serving with the 351st Strategic Missile Wing, is stationed at a Minuteman launch site in nearby Sweetsage, one of 150 such silos in western Missouri in 1983. Next to the site, the Hendrys tend to their farm chores and mind their children. Background television and radio reports reveal information about a Soviet buildup on the East German border. East Germany blockades West Berlin, and the United States issues an ultimatum and places its forces on alert, recalling McCoy from his family at Whiteman Air Force Base.

The following day, NATO attempts to break through the blockade at Helmstedt-Marienborn. Warsaw Pact MiGs hit Würzburg, West Germany. Moscow is evacuated. At the University of Kansas in Lawrence, Kansas, near Kansas City, the word goes out that the Soviets have invaded West Germany. Soviet forces drive toward the Rhine in an armored thrust. Pre-med student Stephen Klein decides to hitchhike home to Joplin, Missouri, while Denise's fiancé Bruce Gallatin witnesses a crowd of shoppers frantically pulling items off the shelves as both sides attack naval targets in the Persian Gulf. Jim prepares his cellar as a bomb shelter for his family. People start to flee Kansas City, and the Emergency Broadcast System is activated. NATO attempts to halt the advance by airbursting three nuclear warheads over Soviet troops, while a Soviet nuclear device destroys the NATO headquarters in Brussels. U.S. Air Force personnel aboard the SAC Airborne Command Post receive notification of an incoming wave of 300 ICBMs. The launch order comes in from the U.S. President for a full nuclear strike on the Soviet Union. People in and around Kansas City watch in horror as hundreds of ICBMs are launched. The Soviet Union is the first to launch an intercontinental nuclear strike, but it is unclear which side used nuclear weapons first in Europe.

McCoy flees his now-empty silo, telling his fellow airmen the war is effectively over. A high-altitude nuclear explosion's EMP disables vehicles and destroys the power grid. Nuclear missiles rain across the region on both military and civilian targets. Kansas City's last minutes are frantic; panicked crowds flood the streets, and cars jam the highways out of the city. As the Soviet missiles arrive, nuclear blasts completely destroy the Kansas City metropolitan area and numerous places nearby: Bruce, Helen and Marilyn Oakes, the Hendrys, and McCoy's family are among the many thousands of people incinerated, while the young Danny Dahlberg is flash-blinded by a nuclear detonation many miles away. Dr. Oakes, stranded on the highway, walks to University Hospital at Lawrence, takes charge, and begins treating patients. Klein finds the Dahlberg home and begs for refuge in the family's basement, which is granted. Oakes receives fallout reports by shortwave from KU professor Joe Huxley in the science building: travel outdoors is fatal. Patients continue to come and supplies dwindle. Delirious after days in the basement shelter, Denise runs outside; Klein retrieves her, but both are exposed to the thick radioactive dust. McCoy heads towards Sedalia until he learns of its destruction from passing refugees. He befriends a mute man and travels to the hospital, where he dies of radiation poisoning. Oakes bonds with Nurse Nancy Bauer, who later dies of meningitis, and a pregnant woman pleads with him to tell her she's wrong to be hopeless.

In a radio speech, the U.S. President announces a ceasefire, promises relief, and stresses no surrender and a reliance on American principles, set to shots of filthy, listless, or dead Americans among the ruins. Attempts at aid from the National Guard and infrastructural redevelopment prove fruitless, and summary executions for looting and other offenses become commonplace. Jim Dahlberg (and, it is implied, his remaining family) is eventually killed by squatters, while Denise, Klein, and Oakes are wasting away from radiation sickness. Returning to an irradiated Kansas City to see his old home one last time, Oakes witnesses National Guardsmen blindfolding and executing looters. He finds squatters in the ruins of his home and attempts to drive them off, but is instead offered food. Oakes collapses and weeps, and one of the squatters comforts him. The film ends with an overlying audio clip of Huxley's voice on the radio as the screen fades to black, asking if anybody can still hear him, only to be met with silence until the credits, as a Morse code signal transmits a single message to the viewer: M-A-D. Most versions of The Day After include a textual ending disclaimer just before the end credits, stating that the film is fictional and that the real-life outcome of a nuclear war would be much worse than the events portrayed onscreen.

== Cast ==
The Oakeses

- Jason Robards as Dr. Russell Oakes
- Georgann Johnson as Helen Oakes
- Kyle Aletter as Marilyn Oakes

The Dahlbergs

- John Cullum as Jim Dahlberg
- Bibi Besch as Eve Dahlberg
- Lori Lethin as Denise Dahlberg
- Doug Scott as Danny Dahlberg
- Ellen Anthony as Joleen Dahlberg

Hospital staff

- JoBeth Williams as Nurse Nancy Bauer
- Calvin Jung as Dr. Sam Hachiya
- Lin McCarthy as Dr. Austin
- Rosanna Huffman as Dr. Wallenberg
- George Petrie as Dr. Landowska
- Jonathan Estrin as Julian French
- Wayne Knight as Man in Hospital

Others

- Steve Guttenberg as Stephen Klein
- John Lithgow as Joe Huxley
- Amy Madigan as Alison Ransom
- William Allen Young as Airman First Class Billy McCoy
- Jeff East as Bruce Gallatin
- Dennis Lipscomb as Reverend Walker
- Clayton Day as Dennis Hendry
- Antonie Becker as Ellen Hendry
- Stephen Furst as Aldo
- Arliss Howard as Tom Cooper
- Stan Wilson as Vinnie Conrad
- Harry Bugin as Man at phone

== Production ==
The Day After was the idea of ABC Motion Picture Division President Brandon Stoddard, who, after watching The China Syndrome, was so impressed that he envisioned creating a film exploring the effects of nuclear war on the United States. Stoddard asked his executive vice president of television movies and miniseries, Stu Samuels, to develop a script. Samuels created the title The Day After to emphasize that the story was about, not a nuclear war itself, but the aftermath. Samuels suggested several writers, and eventually, Stoddard commissioned the veteran television writer Edward Hume to write the script in 1981. ABC, which financed the production, was concerned about the graphic nature of the film and how to portray the subject appropriately on a family-oriented television channel. Hume undertook a massive amount of research on nuclear war and went through several drafts until ABC finally deemed the plot and characters acceptable.

A scene from the film, in which a nuclear weapon detonates near De Soto, Kansas.

Originally, the film was based more around and in Kansas City, Missouri. Kansas City was not bombed in the original script although Whiteman Air Force Base was, which made Kansas City suffer shock waves and the horde of survivors staggering into town. There was no Lawrence, Kansas in the story although there was a small Kansas town called "Hampton." While Hume was writing the script, he and the producer Robert Papazian, who had great experience in on-location shooting, took several trips to Kansas City to scout locations and met with officials from the Kansas film commission and from the Kansas tourist offices to search for a suitable location for "Hampton." It came down to a choice of either Warrensburg, Missouri, and Lawrence, Kansas, both college towns. Warrensburg was home of Central Missouri State University and was near Whiteman Air Force Base, and Lawrence was home of the University of Kansas and was near Kansas City. Hume and Papazian ended up selecting Lawrence because of the access to a number of good locations: a university, a hospital, football and basketball venues, farms, and a flat countryside. Lawrence was also agreed upon as being the "geographic center" of the United States. The Lawrence people were urging ABC to change the name "Hampton" to "Lawrence" in the script.

Back in Los Angeles, the idea of making a TV movie showing the true effects of nuclear war on average American citizens was still stirring up controversy. ABC, Hume, and Papazian realized that for the scene depicting the nuclear blast, they would have to use state-of-the-art special effects and so took the first step by hiring some of the best special effects people in the business to draw up some storyboards for the complicated blast scene. ABC then hired Robert Butler to direct the project. For several months, the group worked on drawing up storyboards and revising the script again and again. Then, in early 1982, Butler was forced to leave The Day After because of other contractual commitments. ABC then offered the project to two other directors, who both turned it down. Finally, in May, ABC hired the feature film director Nicholas Meyer, who had just completed the blockbuster Star Trek II: The Wrath of Khan. Meyer was apprehensive at first and doubted ABC would get away with making a television film on nuclear war without the censors diminishing its effect. However, after reading the script, Meyer agreed to direct The Day After.

Meyer wanted to make sure that he would film the script he was offered. He did not want the censors to censor the film or the film to be a regular Hollywood disaster movie from the start. Meyer figured the more The Day After resembled such a film, the less effective it would be, and he preferred to present the facts of nuclear war to viewers. He made it clear to ABC that no big TV or film stars should be in The Day After. ABC agreed but wanted to have one star to help attract European audiences to the film when it would be shown theatrically there. Later, while flying to visit his parents in New York City, Meyer happened to be on the same plane with Jason Robards and asked him to join the cast.

Meyer plunged into several months of nuclear research, which made him quite pessimistic about the future, to the point of becoming ill each evening when he came home from work. Meyer and Papazian also made trips to the ABC censors and to the United States Department of Defense during their research phase and experienced conflicts with both. Meyer had many heated arguments over elements in the script that the network censors wanted cut out of the film. The Department of Defense said that it would cooperate with ABC if the script clarified that the Soviets launched their missiles first, which Meyer and Papazian took pains not to do.

Meyer, Papazian, Hume, and several casting directors spent most of July 1982 taking numerous trips to Kansas City. In between casting in Los Angeles, where they relied mostly on unknowns, they would fly to the Kansas City area to interview local actors and scout scenery. They were hoping to find some real Midwesterners for smaller roles. Hollywood casting directors strolled through shopping malls in Kansas City to look for local people to fill small and supporting roles, the daily newspaper in Lawrence ran an advertisement calling for local residents to sign up as extras, and a professor of theater and film at the University of Kansas was hired to head up local casting. Out of the eighty or so speaking parts, only fifteen were cast in Los Angeles. The remaining roles were filled in Kansas City and Lawrence.

While in Kansas City, Meyer and Papazian toured the Federal Emergency Management Agency offices in Kansas City. When asked about its plans for surviving nuclear war, a FEMA official replied that it was experimenting with putting evacuation instructions in telephone books in New England. "In about six years, everyone should have them." That meeting led Meyer to later refer to FEMA as "a complete joke." It was during that time that the decision was made to change "Hampton" in the script to "Lawrence." Meyer and Hume figured since Lawrence was a real town, it would be more believable, and besides, it was a perfect choice to play a representative of Middle America. The town boasted a "socio-cultural mix," sat near the exact geographic center of the Continental U.S., and was a prime missile target according to Hume and Meyer's research because 150 Minuteman missile silos stood nearby. Lawrence had some great locations, and its people were more supportive of the project. Suddenly, less emphasis was put on Kansas City, the decision was made to have the city annihilated in the script, and Lawrence was made the primary location in the film.

=== Editing ===
ABC originally planned to air The Day After as a four-hour "television event" that would be spread over two nights with a total running time of 180 minutes without commercials. The director Nicholas Meyer felt the original script was padded, and suggested cutting out an hour of material to present the whole film in one night. The network stuck with its two-night broadcast plan, and Meyer filmed the entire three-hour script, as evidenced by a 172-minute workprint that has surfaced. Subsequently, the network found that it was difficult to find advertisers because of the subject matter. ABC relented and allowed Meyer to edit the film for a one-night broadcast version. Meyer's original single-night cut ran two hours and twenty minutes, which he presented to the network. After that screening, many executives were deeply moved, and some even cried, which led Meyer to believe they approved of his cut.

Nevertheless, a further six-month struggle ensued over the final shape of the film. Network censors had opinions about the inclusion of specific scenes, and ABC itself was eventually intent on "trimming the film to the bone" and made demands to cut out many scenes that Meyer strongly lobbied to keep. Finally, Meyer and his editor, Bill Dornisch, balked. Dornisch was fired, and Meyer walked away from the project. ABC brought in other editors, but the network ultimately was not happy with the results they produced. It finally brought Meyer back and reached a compromise, with Meyer paring down The Day After to a final running time of 120 minutes.

=== The Day Before campaign ===
Josh Baran and Mark Graham were anti-nuclear activists who were secretly given a bootleg copy of the film by Nick Meyer prior to the ABC broadcast. They sent copies of the film to various peace groups, interviewed peace leaders about the film, and held screenings in homes, bars, and restaurants. There were post-screening discussion groups and town hall meetings. They held private screenings for the media, like Time magazine, the New York Times, and the BBC. As word got out about the film, higher ups wanted to see it including members of the House of Commons, and even the Pope. Baran and Graham called it The Day Before project to hijack ABC's marketing of the film. One scholar said they "pioneered the piggybacking of a public issue onto the release of a commercial media product", and Variety called it "the greatest PR campaign in history."

The consequences of Meyer's bootleg copy and subsequent The Day Before PR campaign was a groundswell of public interest and discussion before the film was ever broadcast. This made it difficult for ABC executives to kill the film, because there were rumors they wanted to quietly shelve it, including rumors that Ronald Reagan had hinted to studio executives he didn't want the film broadcast.

=== Broadcast ===
The Day After was initially scheduled to premiere on ABC in May 1983, but the post-production work to reduce the film's length pushed back its initial airdate to November. Censors forced ABC to cut an entire scene of a child having a nightmare about nuclear holocaust and then sitting up screaming. A psychiatrist told ABC that it would disturb children. "This strikes me as ludicrous," Meyer wrote in TV Guide at the time, "not only in relation to the rest of the film, but also when contrasted with the huge doses of violence to be found on any average evening of TV viewing." More cuts were made, including to a scene in which Denise possesses a diaphragm. Another scene in which a hospital patient abruptly sits up screaming was excised from the original television broadcast but restored for home video releases.

Meyer persuaded ABC to dedicate the film to the citizens of Lawrence, and also to put a disclaimer at the end of the film following the credits to let viewers know that The Day After downplayed the true effects of nuclear war so it could have a story. The disclaimer also included a list of books that provided more information on the subject.

The Day After received a large promotional campaign prior to its broadcast. Commercials aired several months in advance, and ABC distributed half-a-million "viewer's guides" that discussed the dangers of nuclear war and prepared the viewer for the graphic scenes of mushroom clouds and radiation burn victims. Discussion groups were also formed nationwide.

=== Music ===
The composer David Raksin wrote original music and adapted music from The River, a documentary film score by the concert composer Virgil Thomson, by featuring an adaptation of the hymn "How Firm a Foundation". Although he recorded just under 30 minutes of music, much of it was edited out of the final cut. Music from the First Strike footage, conversely, was not edited out.

=== Deleted and alternative scenes ===
The film was shortened from the original three hours of running time to two, which caused the scrapping of several planned special-effects scenes although storyboards were made in anticipation of a possible "expanded" version. They included a "bird's eye" view of Kansas City at the moment of two nuclear detonations as seen from a Boeing 737 airliner approaching the city's airport, simulated newsreel footage of U.S. troops in West Germany taking up positions in preparation of advancing Soviet armored units, and the tactical nuclear exchange in Germany between NATO and the Warsaw Pact after the attacking Warsaw Pact force breaks through and overwhelms the NATO lines.

ABC censors severely toned down scenes to reduce the body count or severe burn victims. Meyer refused to remove key scenes, but reportedly, some eight and a half minutes of excised footage still exist, significantly more graphic. Some footage was reinstated for the film's release on home video. Additionally, the nuclear attack scene was longer and supposed to feature very graphic and very accurate shots of what happens to a human body during a nuclear blast. Examples included people being set on fire; their flesh carbonizing; being burned to the bone; eyes melting; faceless heads; skin hanging; deaths from flying glass and debris, limbs torn off, being crushed, and blown from buildings by the shockwave; and people in fallout shelters suffocating during the firestorm. Also cut were images of radiation sickness, as well as graphic post-attack violence from survivors such as food riots, looting, and general lawlessness as authorities attempted to restore order.

One cut scene showed surviving students battling over food. The two sides were to be athletes and the science students under the guidance of Professor Huxley. Another brief scene that was later cut related to a firing squad in which two U.S. soldiers are blindfolded and executed. In that scene, an officer reads the charges, verdict, and sentence as a bandaged chaplain reads the Last Rites. A similar sequence occurs in a 1965 British-produced faux documentary, The War Game. In the initial 1983 broadcast of The Day After, when the U.S. president addresses the nation, the voice was an imitation of President Reagan, who later stated that he watched the film and was deeply moved. In subsequent broadcasts, that voice was overdubbed by a stock actor.

Home video releases in the U.S. and internationally come in at various running times, many listed at 126 or 127 minutes. Full screen (4:3 aspect ratio) seems to be more common than widescreen. RCA videodiscs of the early 1980s were limited to 2 hours per disc so that full screen release appears to be closest to what originally aired on ABC in the U.S. A 2001 U.S. VHS version (Anchor Bay Entertainment, Troy, Michigan) lists a running time of 122 minutes. A 1995 double laser disc "director's cut" version (Image Entertainment) runs 127 minutes, includes commentary by director Nicholas Meyer and is "presented in its 1.75:1 European theatrical aspect ratio" (according to the LD jacket).

Two different German DVD releases run at 122 and 115 minutes respectively; the edits reportedly downplay the Soviet Union's role. A two disc Blu-ray special edition was released in 2018 by the video specialty label Kino Lorber and present the film in high definition. The release contains the 122-minute television cut, presented in a 4:3 aspect ratio as broadcast, as well as the 127-minute theatrical cut, presented in a 16:9 widescreen aspect ratio.

== Reception ==
On its original broadcast, on Sunday, November 20, 1983, John Cullum warned viewers before the film was premiered that the film would contain graphic and disturbing scenes and encouraged parents who had young children watching to watch together and discuss the issues of nuclear warfare. ABC and local TV affiliates opened 1-800 hotlines with counselors standing by. There were no commercial breaks after the nuclear attack scenes.

Following the broadcast, ABC aired a live debate on Viewpoint, the network's occasional discussion program hosted by Nightline's Ted Koppel. The program featured astronomer Carl Sagan, former Secretary of State Henry Kissinger, Holocaust survivor Elie Wiesel, former Secretary of Defense Robert McNamara, General Brent Scowcroft, and conservative commentator William F. Buckley Jr. Sagan argued against nuclear proliferation, but Buckley promoted the concept of nuclear deterrence. Sagan described the arms race in the following terms: "Imagine a room awash in gasoline, and there are two implacable enemies in that room. One of them has nine thousand matches, the other seven thousand matches. Each of them is concerned about who's ahead, who's stronger."

The film and its subject matter were prominently featured in the news media both before and after the broadcast, appearing on the covers of Time, Newsweek, U.S. News & World Report, and TV Guide. Critics tended to claim the film was sensationalizing nuclear war or that it was too tame. The special effects and realistic portrayal of nuclear war received praise. The film received 12 Emmy nominations and won two Emmy awards. It was rated "way above average" in Leonard Maltin's Movie Guide until all reviews for films exclusive to television were removed from the publication.

In the United States, 38.5 million households, or an estimated 100 million people, watched The Day After on its first broadcast, a record audience for a made-for-TV movie. Producers Sales Organization released the film theatrically around the world, in the Eastern Bloc, China, North Korea and Cuba (this international version contained six minutes of footage not in the telecast edition). Since commercials are not sold in those markets, Producers Sales Organization failed to gain revenue to the tune of an undisclosed sum. Years later, the international version was released to tape by Embassy Home Entertainment.

The actor and former Nixon adviser Ben Stein, critical of the movie's message that the strategy of mutual assured destruction would lead to a war, wrote in the Los Angeles Herald-Examiner what life might be like in an America under Soviet occupation. Stein's idea was eventually dramatized in the miniseries Amerika, also broadcast by ABC. The New York Post accused Meyer of being a traitor, writing, "Why is Nicholas Meyer doing Yuri Andropov's work for him?" Phyllis Schlafly declared that "This film was made by people who want to disarm the country, and who are willing to make a $7 million contribution to that cause". Richard Grenier in National Review accused The Day After of promoting "unpatriotic" and pro-Soviet attitudes. Much press comment focused on the unanswered question in the film of who started the war. The television critic Matt Zoller Seitz, in his 2016 book co-written with Alan Sepinwall, TV (The Book), named The Day After as the fourth-greatest American TV movie of all time: "Very possibly the bleakest TV-movie ever broadcast, The Day After is an explicitly antiwar statement dedicated entirely to showing audiences what would happen if nuclear weapons were used on civilian populations in the United States."

=== Effects on policymakers ===
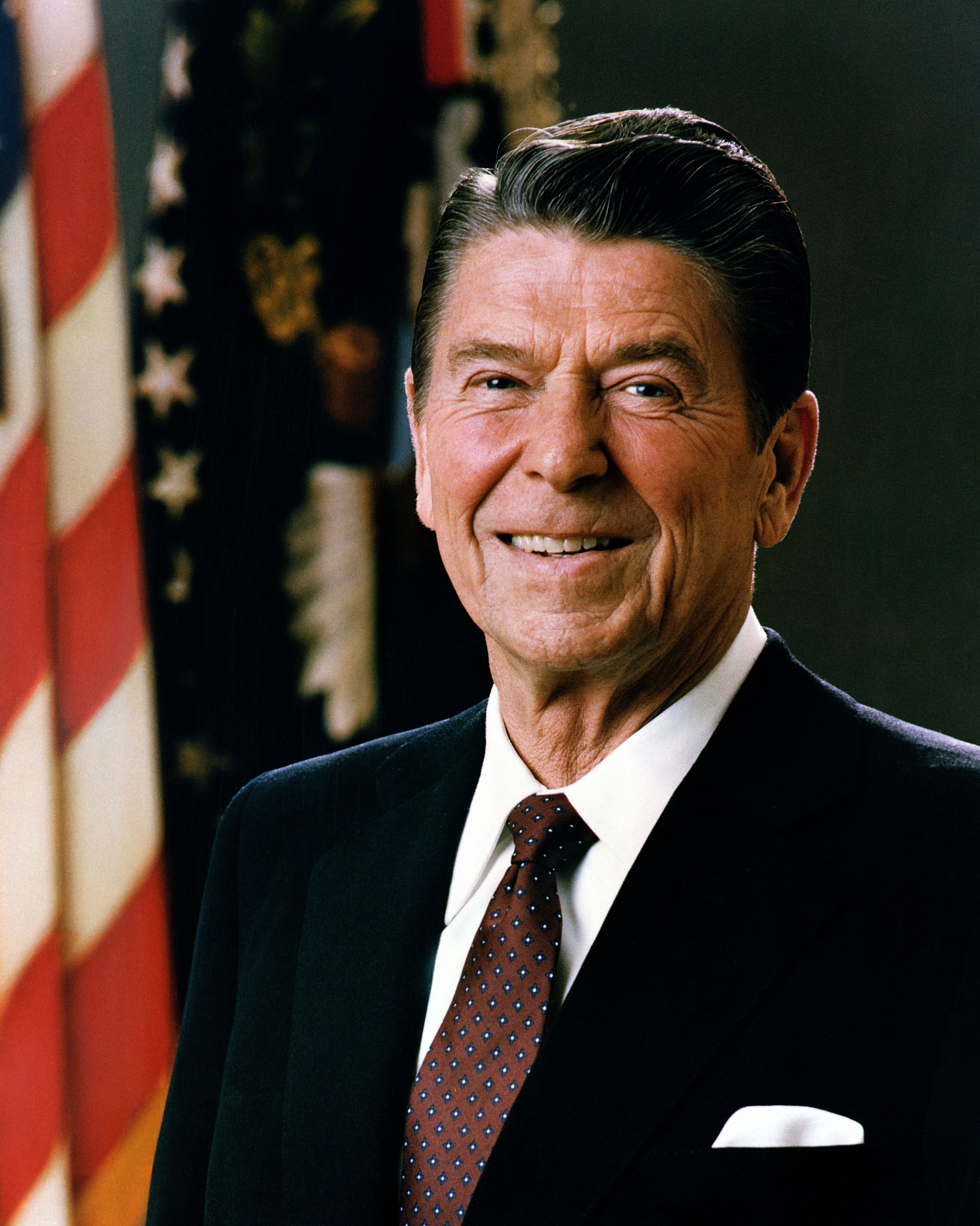
After seeing the film, Ronald Reagan wrote that the film had been very effective and left him depressed.

US President Ronald Reagan watched the film more than a month before its screening on Columbus Day, October 10, 1983. He wrote in his diary that the film was "very effective and left me greatly depressed" and that it changed his mind on the prevailing policy on a "nuclear war". The film was also screened for the Joint Chiefs of Staff. A government advisor who attended the screening, a friend of Meyer, told him: "If you wanted to draw blood, you did it. Those guys sat there like they were turned to stone." In 1987, Reagan and Soviet Premier Mikhail Gorbachev signed the Intermediate-Range Nuclear Forces Treaty, which resulted in the banning and reducing of their nuclear arsenal. In Reagan's memoirs, he drew a direct line from the film to the signing. Reagan supposedly later sent Meyer a telegram after the summit: "Don't think your movie didn't have any part of this, because it did." During an interview in 2010, Meyer said that the telegram was a myth and that the sentiment stemmed from a friend's letter to Meyer. He suggested the story had origins in editing notes received from the White House during the production, which "may have been a joke, but it wouldn't surprise me, him being an old Hollywood guy."

The film also had impact outside the United States. In 1987, during the era of Gorbachev's glasnost and perestroika reforms, the film was shown on Soviet television. Four years earlier, Georgia Representative Elliott Levitas and 91 co-sponsors introduced a resolution in the U.S. House of Representatives "[expressing] the sense of the Congress that the American Broadcasting Company, the Department of State, and the U.S. Information Agency should work to have the television movie The Day After aired to the Soviet public".

== Future ==
When interviewed in 2023 about the making of the movie, director Nicholas Meyer stated that he had been trying to "get a new version of the movie made. A global version. And I've been to all the streamers. And nobody wants to do it now any more than they wanted to do it then."

== Accolades ==
The Day After won two Emmy Awards and received 10 other Emmy nominations.

Emmy Awards won:

- Outstanding Film Sound Editing for a Limited Series or a Special (Christopher T. Welch, Brian Courcier, Greg Dillon, David R. Elliott, Michael Hilkene, Fred Judkins, Carl Mahakian, Joseph A. Mayer, Joe Melody, Catherine Shorr, Richard Shorr, Jill Taggart, Roy Prendergast)
- Outstanding Achievement in Special Visual Effects (Robert Blalack, Nancy Rushlow, Dan Pinkham, Chris Regan, Larry Stevens, Christofer Dierdorff, Daniel Nosenchuck, Katherine Kean)

Emmy Award nominations:

- Outstanding Achievement in Hairstyling
- Outstanding Achievement in Makeup
- Outstanding Art Direction for a Limited Series or a Special (Peter Wooley)
- Outstanding Cinematography for a Limited Series or a Special (Gayne Rescher)
- Outstanding Directing in a Limited Series or a Special (Nicholas Meyer)
- Outstanding Drama/Comedy Special (Robert Papazian)
- Outstanding Film Editing for a Limited Series or a Special (William Dornisch and Robert Florio)
- Outstanding Film Sound Mixing for a Limited Series or a Special (Charles T. Knight, Gary C. Bourgeois, Kevin F. Cleary, Robert L. Harman)
- Outstanding Supporting Actor in a Limited Series or a Special (John Lithgow)
- Outstanding Writing in a Limited Series or a Special (Edward Hume)

== See also ==
- List of nuclear holocaust fiction
- Nuclear weapons in popular culture
- Special Bulletin, a 1983 TV movie about an act of nuclear terrorism.
- On the Beach (1959 film)
- Fail Safe (1964 film)
  - Fail Safe (2000 TV film)
- Dr. Strangelove, a 1964 satirical black comedy film by Stanley Kubrick about nuclear warfare in the United States.
- The War Game, a 1966 film about nuclear war and its aftermath in the United Kingdom.
- Stalker (1979 film)
- A Visitor To A Museum (1989 film)
- When the Wind Blows, a 1982 graphic novel about nuclear war
  - the 1986 film
- Testament, a 1983 film about a nuclear explosion over the United States.

It was released two weeks before The Day After aired.

- Threads, a 1984 British television film that centers on a nuclear war and the societal after-effects
- Brother in the Land, a 1984 novel for teenagers by Robert Swindells, about a boy's struggle for survival in the aftermath of a nuclear war.
- Countdown To Looking Glass (1984 film)
- Dead Man's Letters (1986 film)
- By Dawn's Early Light (1990 TV film)
- Russian Symphony (1994 film)
- Television Event, a 2020 documentary film about the making and release of The Day After
- A House of Dynamite (2025 film)
