= Echouafni =

Echouafni is a surname. Notable people with the surname include:

- Houda Echouafni, British-Moroccan actress
- Olivier Echouafni (born 1972), French footballer
