= List of nuclear holocaust fiction =

This list of nuclear holocaust fiction lists the many works of apocalyptic and post-apocalyptic fiction that attempt to describe a world during or after a massive nuclear war, nuclear holocaust, or crash of civilization due to a nuclear electromagnetic pulse.

== Films ==
Title	Year	Author and notes
Five	1951	
Invasion U.S.A.	1952	
Captive Women	1952	
Day the World Ended	1955	
Teenage Caveman	1958	
On the Beach	1959	Nevil Shute (novel); John Paxton (screenplay)
The World, the Flesh and the Devil	1959	
The Time Machine	1960	H. G. Wells (novel); David Duncan (screenplay)
The Last War	1961	
The Day the Earth Caught Fire	1961	
The Creation of the Humanoids	1962	
La jetée	1962	
Panic in Year Zero!	1962	
This is Not a Test	1962	
Ladybug Ladybug	1963	
Fail-Safe	1964	Eugene Burdick and Harvey Wheeler (novel); Walter Bernstein (screenplay)
Dr. Strangelove	1964	Peter George (novel); Peter George, Stanley Kubrick, and Terry Southern (screenplay)
The War Game	1965	
Late August at the Hotel Ozone	1966	Written by Pavel Juráček
In the Year 2889	1967	
Planet of the Apes	1968	Pierre Boulle (novel); Michael Wilson and Rod Serling (screenplay)
The Bed Sitting Room	1969	
Beneath the Planet of the Apes	1970	
Colossus: The Forbin Project	1970	
Glen and Randa	1971	
Battle for the Planet of the Apes	1973	
Zardoz	1974	
A Boy and His Dog	1975	Harlan Ellison (short story); L.Q. Jones, Alvy Moore and Wayne Cruseturner (screenplay)
Barefoot Gen	1976	Tengo Yamada (screenplay), Keiji Nakazawa (manga) The story of Gen Nakaoka and his family, who lived in Hiroshima at the time it was atom-bombed, and their struggles and trials amidst the nuclear holocaust.
Damnation Alley	1977	Roger Zelazny (novel)
Wizards	1977	
Buck Rogers in the 25th Century	1979	Set on an Earth rebuilding after a late 20th-century nuclear war. A theatrical release followed by a TV series of the same title, listed below.
Virus	1980	
Malevil	1981	
Mad Max 2	1981	Also known as The Road Warrior.
The New Barbarians	1982	
Future War 198X	1982	Anime movie produced by Toei Animation about World War III breaking out in the 1980s that triggers a nuclear exchange between the U.S. and the U.S.S.R.
2019, After the Fall of New York	1983	
Special Bulletin	1983	
Testament	1983	
The Day After	1983	
The Prodigal Planet	1983	Part of the film series A Thief in the Night
WarGames	1983	
The Terminator franchise	1984, 1991, 2003, 2009, 2015, 2019	Based on characters created by James Cameron (with acknowledgement to the works of Harlan Ellison)
Countdown to Looking Glass	1984	
Threads	1984	
One Night Stand	1984	
Def-Con 4	1985	
Mad Max: Beyond Thunderdome	1985	
O-Bi, O-Ba: The End of Civilization	1985	
Radioactive Dreams	1985	
Dead Man's Letters	1986	
Fist of the North Star	1986	Based on the manga series
The Sacrifice	1986	
When the Wind Blows	1986	Based on the 1982 graphic novel
Whoops Apocalypse	1986	Based on the ITV series
Akira	1988	
Miracle Mile	1988	
By Dawn's Early Light	1990	
Hardware	1990	
Judge Dredd	1995	
Star Trek: First Contact	1996	Most of the film takes place in the mid-21st century as civilization rebuilds after nuclear war. Continuation of Star Trek: The Next Generation TV series.
The Postman	1997	
Der 3. Weltkrieg, a.k.a. World War III	1998	
Six-String Samurai	1998	
Deterrence	1999	
The Matrix (franchise)	1999, 2003, 2021	
On the Beach	2000	
Equilibrium	2002	
The Dark Hour	2007	
City of Ember	2009	
The Book of Eli	2010	
The Divide	2012	
Cloud Atlas	2012	
Dredd	2012	
Die Gstettensaga: The Rise of Echsenfriedl	2014	
Mad Max: Fury Road	2015	
Z for Zachariah	2015	
Friend of the World	2020	Brian Patrick Butler (screenplay); takes place in the aftermath of a nuclear war. Based on Dr. Strangelove and La Jetée.
A House of Dynamite	2025	Director Kathryn Bigelow

== Television programs ==
- A Carol for Another Christmas (ABC, 1964), Rod Serling TV film
- A Day Called 'X' (CBS, 1957)
- Adventure Time (Cartoon Network, 2010–2018)
- American Horror Story: Apocalypse (FX, 2018)
- Battlestar Galactica (Sci-Fi, 2003, 2004–2009)
- Buck Rogers in the 25th Century (NBC, 1979)
- By Dawn's Early Light (HBO, 1990)
- Countdown to Looking Glass (HBO, 1984)
- Dark Angel (Fox, 2000–2002)
- Der Dritte Weltkrieg (ZDF, 1998)
- Fail Safe (CBS, 2000)
- Fallout (Prime Video, 2024–)
- Genesis II (CBS, 1973)
- Jericho (CBS, 2006–2008)
- Level Seven (BBC, 1966), adapted by J. B. Priestley for Out of the Unknown
- On the Beach (Showtime, 2000)
- Planet Earth (ABC, 1974)
- Special Bulletin (NBC, 1983)
- Terminator: The Sarah Connor Chronicles (Fox, 2008–2009)
- Testament (PBS, 1983)
- The 100 (The CW, 2014–2020)
- The Day After (ABC, 1983)
- The Martian Chronicles miniseries (NBC, 1980)
- The War Game (BBC, 1965)
- Threads TV film (BBC, 1984)
- Whoops Apocalypse (ITV, 1982)
- Woops! (Fox, 1992)
- World War III miniseries (NBC, 1982)

=== Television episodes ===
- The Motorola Television Hour: "Atomic Attack" (1954 ABC-TV series Season 1, Episode 15) – A family living 50 miles away try to flee from the fallout of a hydrogen bomb that fell on New York City. Based on the novel Shadow on the Hearth (1950) by Judith Merrill.
- The Twilight Zone: "Time Enough at Last" (1959)
- Playhouse 90: "Alas, Babylon" (1960)
- The Twilight Zone: "The Old Man in the Cave" (1963)
- Doctor Who: "The Daleks" (1963)
- Star Trek: "Space Seed" (1967). References a third world war taking place in the 1990s (also known as the Eugenics Wars). The later series Star Trek: Strange New Worlds would retcon this to taking place in the mid-21st century, concurrent with the nuclear war established by the film Star Trek: First Contact and other Star Trek series.
- Star Trek: "Assignment: Earth" (1968) – The crew goes back in time to find out how the human race was able to survive the Cold War.
- The Twilight Zone: "A Little Peace and Quiet" (1985)
- The Twilight Zone: "Quarantine" (1986)
- The Twilight Zone: "Shelter Skelter" (1987)
- The Outer Limits: "Bits of Love" (1997)
- The Outer Limits: "The Human Factor" (2002)
- The Twilight Zone: "Chosen" (2002)
- Masters of Science Fiction: "A Clean Escape" (2007)
- What If...?: What If... Ultron Won?" (2021)
- A few episodes of Star Trek: Enterprise depict both humans and Vulcans as being close to extermination caused by nuclear war.

== Novels ==
- After The Bomb by Gloria D. Miklowitz
- Alas, Babylon by Pat Frank
- Amnesia Moon by Jonathan Lethem (regarding Hatfork)
- Ape and Essence by Aldous Huxley
- Arc Light by Eric Harry
- Armageddon's Children By Terry Brooks (2006) (Genesis of Shannara Trilogy book 1)
- The Ashes Series by William W. Johnstone
- The Beast of Heaven by Victor Kelleher
- Brother in the Land by Robert Swindells
- A Canticle for Leibowitz by Walter M. Miller, Jr. (1960)
- Children of the Dust by Louise Lawrence
- The Chrysalids by John Wyndham
- Commander-1 by Peter George
- Damnation Alley by Roger Zelazny
- Dark December by Alfred Coppel
- Dark Mirrors (original title) Schwarze Spiegel by Arno Schmidt
- Davy and other works by Edgar Pangborn
- The Day They H-Bombed Los Angeles by Robert Moore Williams
- Deathlands series by a variety of authors writing under the pen name James Axler
- Dr. Bloodmoney, or How We Got Along After the Bomb by Philip K. Dick
- Do Androids Dream of Electric Sheep? by Philip K. Dick
- Domain by James Herbert
- Doomday Wing by George H. Smith
- Doomsday Plus Twelve by James D. Forman
- Down to a Sunless Sea by David Graham
- Earthwreck! by Thomas N. Scortia
- The Eclipse Trilogy by John Shirley
- The Egghead Republic by Arno Schmidt
- Einstein's Monsters by Martin Amis
- End of the World by Dean Owen (novelization of the film Panic in Year Zero!)
- Ende: A Diary of the Third World War by Anton-Andreas Guha
- Endworld series by David Robbins
- Eon by Greg Bear
- The Erthing Cycle by Wayland Drew
- Fahrenheit 451 by Ray Bradbury
- Farnham's Freehold by Robert A. Heinlein
- Fire Brats by Scott Siegel and Barbara Siegel
- First Angel by Ed Mann, published by Soldier of Fortune magazine
- Fiskadoro by Denis Johnson
- Free Flight by Douglas Terman
- The Gate to Women's Country by Sheri S. Tepper
- A Gift Upon the Shore by M. K. Wren
- God's Grace by Bernard Malamud
- The Guardians series by Richard Austin
- The Hot War series by Harry Turtledove
- The Hunger Games by Suzanne Collins
- The Iron Dream by Norman Spinrad
- Jenny, My Diary by Yorick Blumenfeld
- The Last Children of Schewenborn by Gudrun Pausewang
- The Last Ship by William Brinkley
- The Last War, a 1986 novel by Martyn Godfrey
- Level 7 by Mordecai Roshwald
- The Long Loud Silence by Wilson Tucker
- The Long Tomorrow by Leigh Brackett
- Long Voyage Back by George Cockcroft, under the pen name Luke Rhinehart, 1983
- Malevil by Robert Merle
- The Martian Chronicles by Ray Bradbury
- Metro 2033 by Dmitry Glukhovsky
- The Metrozone Series by Simon Morden
- Nineteen Eighty-Four by George Orwell
- Not This August by C.M. Kornbluth
- Obernewtyn and subsequent novels in the series by Isobelle Carmody
- On the Beach by Nevil Shute
- One Second After by William R. Forstchen
- The Outward Urge, by John Wyndham and Lucas Parkes
- The Pelbar Cycle Book One (Beyond Armageddon) by Paul O. Williams
- Plan of Attack, a 2004 thriller by Dale Brown
- The Postman, a 1985 post-apocalyptic novel by David Brin
- Prayers for the Assassin, by Robert Ferrigno
- Prime Directive, by Judith and Garfield Reeves-Stevens; a Star Trek novel where an alien civilization is apparently destroyed by a sudden, unexpected nuclear war among its own people
- Pulling Through, by Dean Ing; first half of the book is a novel on a family surviving a nuclear blast, the second half is a non-fiction survival guide
- Red Alert, by Peter George
- Resurrection Day by Brendan DuBois
- Riddley Walker by Russell Hoban
- The School for Atheists by Arno Schmidt
- Second Ending, by James White
- The Seventh Day by Hans Hellmut Kirst (original title Keiner Kommt Davon)
- Shadow on the Hearth by Judith Merril (1950) – a novel about a traditional housewife's ordeals in the aftermath of nuclear attack
- The Shannara Series, by Terry Brooks
- The Silo Series by Hugh Howey (2011) – A nuclear exchange is used to cover up a nano-bot attack.
- Single Combat by Dean Ing (second in the Ted Quantril trilogy)
- A Small Armageddon by Mordecai Roshwald
- Star Man's Son by Andre Norton (1952) – a post-apocalyptic novel that takes place about two centuries after the Great-Blowup. It is titled Daybreak – 2250 AD in reprint editions.
- The Steel, the Mist, and the Blazing Sun by Christopher Anvil
- The Survivalist by Jerry Ahern
- Swan Song by Robert McCammon
- Systemic Shock by Dean Ing (first in the Ted Quantril trilogy)
- Tengu (Novel) by Graham Masterton
- Test of Fire by Ben Bova
- There Will Be Time by Poul Anderson
- This Is the Way the World Ends by James Morrow
- This Time Tomorrow by Lauran Paine
- Time Capsule by Mitch Berman
- Tomorrow! by Philip Wylie
- Trinity's Child by William Prochnau (1983)
- Triumph by Philip Wylie
- The Valley-Westside War by Harry Turtledove
- Vaneglory by George Turner
- Viper Three by Walter Wager
- Warday by Whitley Strieber and James Kunetka
- When the Wind Blows by Raymond Briggs
- Wild Country by Dean Ing (Third in the Ted Quantril Trilogy)
- The Wild Shore by Kim Stanley Robinson
- Without Warning by John Birmingham
- The World Next Door by Brad Ferguson
- The World Set Free by H. G. Wells
- Worldwar series by Harry Turtledove – alternate history: World War II turns nuclear in 1943; another nuclear war in the 1960s
- Z for Zachariah by Robert C. O'Brien

== Short stories ==
- "The Blast" by Stuart Cloete (1947), published in 6 Great Short Novels of Science Fiction, ed. Groff Conklin, 1954
- "Thunder and Roses" (1947) by Theodore Sturgeon
- "Not with a Bang" (1949) by Damon Knight
- "The Last Word" (1956) by Damon Knight
- "A Clean Escape" (1985) by John Kessel
- "The 16th October 1985" (2009) by James Plumridge
- "The Edge of the Knife" (1957) by H. Beam Piper
- "Lot" (1953) and "Lot's Daughter" (1954) by Ward Moore (inspiration for the film Panic in Year Zero!)
- "There Will Come Soft Rains" by Ray Bradbury (1950)
- "Preview of the War We Do Not Want", published in Collier's Magazine (1951)
- "If I Forget Thee, Oh Earth" by Arthur C. Clarke – featuring a boy living in a colony on the moon, left isolated by the destruction of the Earth
- "A Boy and His Dog" by Harlan Ellison (1969)
- "Fermi and Frost" by Frederik Pohl (1985)
- "Tight Little Stitches in a Dead Man's Back" by Joe R. Lansdale (1986)
- "The Custodians" by Richard Cowper
- "Summer Thunder" by Stephen King

== Short story collections ==
- Countdown To Midnight, 1984, edited by H. Bruce Franklin
- Beyond Armageddon, 1985, edited by Walter M. Miller, Jr. and Martin Harry Greenberg
- Nuclear War, 1988, edited by Gregory Benford and Martin Harry Greenberg
- The Folk of the Fringe, 1989, Orson Scott Card

== Comics ==
- 2000AD/Judge Dredd, set in a post-war Earth where the majority of the United States is called the "Cursed Earth"
- Akira features Tokyo after a nuclear conflict.
- AXA, set in the aftermath of a nuclear- and biological war with heroine AXA fighting against evil
- Barefoot Gen, Japanese manga about life after the Hiroshima bombing
- Cobalt 60 by Vaughn Bodē, Mark Bodē and Larry Todd, set in a post-apocalyptic world
- Fist of the North Star, a Japanese comic franchise set in a post-nuclear Earth
- Nausicaä of the Valley of the Wind, a Japanese graphic novel, later partly adapted in film, set in a far, post-apocalyptic future, rife with themes of bioethics, environmentalism, genetics and psionics
- The Punisher: The End, a one-shot issue of Marvel Comic's Punisher by Garth Ennis and Richard Corben
- Strontium Dog, set in a post-nuclear war earth where many humans have been deformed by the radiation and are branded as "mutants"
- V for Vendetta by Alan Moore and David Lloyd, is set in an England which has survived through a nuclear war which devastated the majority of the rest of the world.

== Animation shorts ==
- The Big Snit (National Film Board of Canada, Richard Condie; 1985)
- The Hole, 1962, featuring the voice of Dizzy Gillespie
- A Short Vision, 1956
- Good Will to Men, 1955 (Metro-Goldwyn-Mayer)
- Picadon (1978)

== Games ==
Name	Year	Notes
2300 A.D.	1986	Role-playing game
Aftermath!	1981	Role-playing game
After the Holocaust	1976	Board game
Ashes 2063	2018	A post-apocalypse themed total conversion for the GZDoom engine
Ashes Afterglow	2021	The sequel to Ashes 2063
Balance of Power	1985	A computer strategy game of geopolitics during the Cold War
Blast Corps	1997	Nintendo 64 video game
Burntime	1993	A role-playing video game for DOS and Amiga
DEFCON	2007	A real-time strategy game for Windows, Mac and Linux
Fallout series	1997 (1st) 2018 (latest)	A post-apocalyptic role-playing video game for several platforms; early games were top down 2D while the last four are 3D; spiritual successor to Wasteland
Far Cry 5	2018	An action-adventure first-person shooter game set in the fictional Hope County, Montana that has been taken over by a cult who believe the end of the world is about to occur. Towards the end of the game, radio broadcasts begin hinting that the world outside is in chaos and a nuclear war is imminent. If the resist ending is chosen, nuclear explosions appear around the player suggesting a nuclear holocaust has occurred.
Far Cry New Dawn	2019	An action-adventure first-person shooter game standalone sequel of Far Cry 5, set 17 years after the events of Far Cry 5, where the nuclear exchange known as "the Collapse" devastated the world, survivors attempt to rebuild the community in Hope County. Their efforts are however threatened by the Highwaymen, a roving band of organized bandits led by twin sisters Mickey and Lou.
Gamma World	1978	A post-apocalyptic role-playing game
Hotline Miami 2: Wrong Number	2015	A top-down shooter game which is a sequel to Hotline Miami; features a nuclear war between the Soviet Union and the United States at the end of the game
M.A.D. Global Thermonuclear Warfare	2001	PC Strategic simulation game released by Small Rockets
Metro 2033	2010	A survival horror first-person shooter set in post-apocalyptic Moscow
Metro Last Light	2013	A survival horror first-person shooter which is a sequel to Metro 2033
Missile Command	1980	An action video game which was wildly popular in the 1980s, widely recognized in popular culture
The Morrow Project	1980	Role-playing game
Neocron	2002	A post-apocalyptic cyberpunk MMORPG for Windows
Norad	1981	An action strategy game for the Apple II, where the player defends the United States against a nuclear attack.
Nuclear Throne	2015	A twin-stick shooter roguelike following a group of mutants in a nuclear wasteland
Nuclear War	1989	A turn-based strategy game for Amiga and DOS
Nuclear War	1965	A humorous card game from Flying Buffalo
NukeWar	1980	A turn-based strategy game for Apple II, Commodore 64, and other early home computer systems
Planetarian: The Reverie of a Little Planet	2004	A post-apocalyptic visual novel
Star Ocean: The Last Hope	2009	An action role-playing video game for Xbox 360 and PlayStation 3
Superpower 2	2004	A real-time strategy wargame
Supremacy: The Game of the Superpowers	1984	A board wargame
Theatre Europe	1985	A turn-based strategy video game about a fictional war in Europe between NATO and the Warsaw Pact, in which both sides use nuclear and chemical weapons against each other
Trinity	1986	An interactive fiction game examining the futile nature of nuclear war
Trojan	1986	Arcade game and platformer set shortly after a nuclear war has destroyed civilization, which is now overrun by occultists who are bent on terrorizing the surviving population with psychological and biochemical warfare
Twilight: 2000	1984	A role-playing game
WarGames	1984	A video game based on the game in the hit movie
Warzone 2100	1999	An open-source real-time strategy and real-time tactics hybrid computer game
Wasteland	1988	A post-apocalyptic role-playing video game
Wasteland 2	2014	A post-apocalyptic role-playing game; a sequel to Wasteland
60 Seconds!	2015	A game where the player helps a family of 4 to survive inside a nuclear bunker

== See also ==
- Nuclear holocaust
- Nuclear weapons in popular culture
- World War III in popular culture
- List of apocalyptic and post-apocalyptic fiction
- Apocalyptic and post-apocalyptic fiction
- List of books about nuclear issues
- List of films about nuclear issues
- List of apocalyptic films
- List of dystopian films
- List of songs about nuclear war
- Nuclear Holocausts: Atomic War in Fiction
