= Threads (1984 film) =

1984 apocalyptic war drama television film

- British DVD cover
- Genre: Apocalyptic; Drama; War; Dystopia
- Written by: Barry Hines
- Directed by: Mick Jackson
- Starring: Karen Meagher; Reece Dinsdale
- Country of origin: United Kingdom
- Original language: English

Production
- Executive producers: Graham Massey; John Purdie
- Producers: Mick Jackson; Peter Wolfes
- Cinematography: Andrew Dunn; Paul Morris
- Editors: Jim Latham; Donna Bickerstaff
- Running time: 112 minutes
- Production companies: British Broadcasting Corporation; Nine Network Australia; Western-World Television Inc
- Budget: £400,000

Original release
- Network: BBC
- Release: 23 September 1984

Threads is a 1984 apocalyptic anti-war drama television film directed and produced by Mick Jackson and written by Barry Hines. A dramatic account of the potential medical, economic, social, and environmental consequences of a nuclear war in Britain, it follows two families in Sheffield as a confrontation between the United States and the Soviet Union erupts into war and a general nuclear exchange between NATO and the Warsaw Pact.

An international co-production between the BBC, Nine Network, and Western-World Television Inc., the film was shot on a budget of £400,000 (equivalent to £1.34 million in 2024). It was the first of its kind to depict a nuclear winter and has been cited as the film "which comes closest to representing the full horror of nuclear war and its aftermath, as well as the catastrophic impact that the event would have on human culture". It has been compared to The War Game (1966) and The Day After (1983). It was nominated for seven BAFTA Awards in 1985 and won for Best Single Drama, Best Design, Best Film Cameraman, and Best Film Editor.

== Plot ==
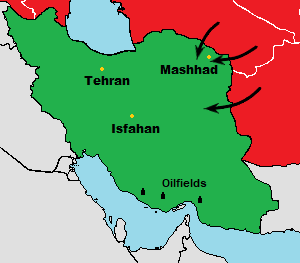
Soviet troop movements into Iran as shown in a clipping from The Observer early in the film (with occupied Afghanistan in red)

In the English city of Sheffield, Ruth Beckett and Jimmy Kemp, who are young adults, plan to marry after learning of Ruth's unplanned pregnancy. Meanwhile, an international crisis develops after the Soviet Union invades northern Iran in response to a United States-backed coup in the country. Daily life in Sheffield continues while an American ultimatum demanding joint withdrawal from Iran expires.

After a limited nuclear exchange in Mashhad, armed conflict breaks out between America and the Soviet Union. As Britain prepares for the possibility of nuclear war, society gradually destabilises over the course of two days and violent suppression of anti-war protests takes place across the country. Inhabitants of Sheffield are spurred into panic buying and looting. Sheffield City Council officials begin setting up emergency administrative operations in a makeshift basement bunker in case the region's centre of government should be destroyed. Ruth's family prepare to use their cellar as a shelter, while Jimmy's family construct a lean-to from mattresses and doors, as instructed by the Protect and Survive pamphlets and television broadcasts.

Jimmy is arguing with panic-buyers at the joinery with his friend Bob when civil defence sirens sound. Taking cover under a lorry, they see a mushroom cloud in the distance; a tactical nuclear attack on a nearby airbase at Finningley causes much collateral damage to Sheffield, while attacks on other NATO targets across Britain kill and injure tens of millions of people. Jimmy attempts to reach Ruth, but is never seen again. Moments later, a 1-megaton weapon detonates over Sheffield. Jimmy's brother Michael is killed in the initial firestorm when their finch aviary collapses, while his mother suffers severe burns and his father falls ill from radiation poisoning in the following days. Ruth and her family fare better in their underground shelter, although Ruth's grandmother soon falls ill.

As the Sheffield council's efforts to maintain order fail, they slowly suffocate in their bunker, which is buried under the rubble of Sheffield Town Hall. Meanwhile, Ruth flees her shelter after her grandmother dies, discovering that society has collapsed over the course of nine days. Because of dangers posed by fallout, rescue efforts and attempts to control fires are halted; local authority has broken down, martial law has been implemented and survivors are left to fend for themselves. Ruth visits Jimmy's house, finding his mother's corpse. She takes Jimmy's Handbook of Foreign Birds as a keepsake, then visits the hospital, which is under-equipped and overwhelmed by hundreds of wounded civilians. By the time Ruth returns home, her parents have been killed by looters.

With food becoming scarce as a result of looting and fires, Ruth travels west to the countryside near Buxton. Food soon becomes the only form of currency as nuclear winter causes a severely diminished harvest and mass starvation. Ruth briefly reunites with Bob as the two reach Buxton, where local authorities unsuccessfully attempt to convince the residents to house refugees. She later gives birth to her daughter Jane alone in an abandoned barn while a chained dog barks at her outside. One year later, sunlight levels have mostly returned to normal, though damage to the ozone layer means that higher UV levels have increased the risks of cataracts and skin cancer.

A decade later, Britain's surviving population has dropped to an estimated 4 to 11 million – similar to that of the Middle Ages – and the country remains devastated. Ruth and her daughter Jane work in the fields with other survivors, cultivating crops by hand. Because of the elective mutism of many adult survivors, foetal radiation exposure, and the absence of organised schooling, many children born after the war, including Jane, speak non-standard English. Ruth dies in bed, prematurely aged and blinded by cataracts. Jane watches her mother die, responding with apathy and taking the last of Ruth's possessions, leaving behind Jimmy's bird book, which Ruth has kept.

Three years later, industry resumes via limited steam power, although the population still lives in squalor. Jane and two young men are caught stealing food; one of the men is shot dead while the other flees with Jane. They start to fight over who gets to eat first before their struggle degenerates into sex. Jane later gives birth in a makeshift hospital, where the nurse wraps the silent baby in a bloody sheet and gives it to Jane, who looks at it in horror.

== Cast ==
- Paul Vaughan as the Narrator
- Karen Meagher as Ruth Beckett
- Reece Dinsdale as Jimmy Kemp
- David Brierley as Bill Kemp
- Rita May as Mrs Kemp, with Dorothy Ford as her stunt double
- Nicholas Lane as Michael Kemp
- Jane Hazlegrove as Alison Kemp
- Henry Moxon as Gordon Beckett
- June Broughton as Mrs Beckett
- Sylvia Stoker as Granny Beckett
- Harry Beety as Clive Sutton (Controller)
- Ruth Holden as Marjorie Sutton
- Ashley Barker as Bob
- Michael O'Hagan as Chief Superintendent Alan Hirst
- Phil Rose as Dr Carlton, the Medical Officer
- Steve Halliwell as Steve, the Information Officer
- Phil Askham as Mr Stothard
- Anna Seymour as Mrs Stothard
- Fiona Rook as Carol Stothard
- Joe Holmes as George Langley
- Victoria O'Keefe as Jane
- Lee Daley as Spike
- Marcus Lund as Gaz
- Lesley Judd and Colin Ward-Lewis as Newscasters
- Anne Sellors as Frightened Woman

== Production and themes ==
Our intention in making Threads was to step aside from the politics and – I hope convincingly – show the actual effects on either side should our best endeavours to prevent nuclear war fail.

— Screenwriter Barry Hines

Threads was first commissioned (under the working title Beyond Armageddon) by the Director-General of the BBC Alasdair Milne, after he watched the 1966 drama-documentary The War Game, which had not been shown on the BBC when it was made, although it had a limited release in cinemas. Mick Jackson was hired to direct the film, as he had previously worked in the area of nuclear apocalypse in 1982, producing the BBC Q.E.D. documentary A Guide to Armageddon. This was considered a breakthrough at the time, considering the previous banning of The War Game, which BBC staff believed would have resulted in mass suicides if aired. Jackson subsequently travelled around the UK and the US, consulting leading scientists, psychologists, doctors, defence specialists and strategic experts to create the most realistic depiction of nuclear war possible for his next film. Jackson consulted various sources in his research, including the 1983 Science article Nuclear Winter: Global Consequences of Multiple Nuclear Explosions, penned by Carl Sagan and James B. Pollack. Details of a possible attack scenario and the extent of the damage were derived from Doomsday, Britain after Nuclear Attack (1983), while the ineffective post-war plans of the British government came from Duncan Campbell's 1982 exposé War Plan UK. In portraying the psychological damage suffered by survivors, Jackson took inspiration from the behaviour of the Hibakusha and Magnus Clarke's 1982 book Nuclear Destruction of Britain. Sheffield was chosen as the main location partly because of its "nuclear-free zone" policy that made the council sympathetic to the local filming and partly because it seemed likely that the USSR would strike an industrial city in the centre of the country.

Jackson hired Barry Hines to write the script because of his political awareness. The relationship between the two was strained on several occasions, as Hines spent much of his time on set, and apparently disliked Jackson on account of his middle class upbringing. They also disagreed about Paul Vaughan's narration, which Hines felt was detrimental to the drama. As part of their research, the two spent a week at the Home Office training centre for "official survivors" in Easingwold which, according to Hines, showed just "how disorganised [post-war reconstruction] would be". A subsequent request by Jackson for the Home Office to provide him with a copy of the training notes was approved on the basis that refusal "could cause offence and give the impression that [the Home Office] had something to hide", with a similar logic underpinning the decision to give him the full and unredacted notes.

Auditions were advertised in The Star, and took place in the ballroom of Sheffield City Hall, where 1,100 candidates turned up. Extras were chosen on the basis of height and age, and were all told to look "miserable" and to wear ragged clothes; the majority were CND supporters. The makeup for extras playing third-degree-burn victims consisted of Rice Krispies and tomato ketchup, while the prop umbilical cord that Ruth bites through after giving birth to Jane was made from liquorice. The scenes taking place six weeks after the attack were shot at Curbar Edge in the Peak District National Park; because weather conditions were considered too fine to pass off as a nuclear winter, stage snow had to be spread around the rocks and heather, and cameramen installed light filters on their equipment to block out the sunlight. Although Jackson initially considered casting actors from Granada Television's Coronation Street, he later decided to take a neorealist approach, and opted to cast relatively unknown actors to heighten the film's impact through the use of characters the audience could relate to. He also made an effort to leave some things (such as the exact state of Jane's baby) unseen, "to let images and emotion happen in people's minds, or rather in the extensions of their imaginations" and so enhance the horror effect.

The circumstances in which Jane's child is conceived towards the end of the film have been interpreted as rape. The screenplay states that "their wrestling turns sexual, and we hear JANE exclaiming as they have crude intercourse."

== Release history ==
=== Broadcast ===
Threads was a co-production of the BBC, Nine Network and Western-World Television, Inc. It was first broadcast on BBC2 on 23 September 1984 at 9:30 pm, and achieved the highest ratings on the channel (6.9 million) of the week. The cast and around six hundred extras from the Sheffield area were invited to a private screening at the Fiesta Nightclub ahead of the official broadcast. It was repeated on BBC1 on 1 August 1985 as part of a week of programmes marking the fortieth anniversary of the atomic bombings of Hiroshima and Nagasaki, which also saw the first television screening of The War Game (which had been deemed too disturbing for television in the 20 years since it had been made). Threads was not shown again on British screens until the digital channel BBC Four broadcast it in October 2003. It was also shown on UKTV Documentary in September 2004 and April 2005.

In January 2018, nuclear history journalist Julie McDowall led a distributed viewing of the film, encouraging the audience to share their reactions on Twitter under the hashtag #threaddread, as part of a campaign to ask the BBC to show the film for the first time since 2003. A new BBC broadcast, again on BBC Four, eventually took place on 9 October 2024 to mark the film's fortieth anniversary.

Threads was broadcast in the United States on cable network Superstation TBS on 13 January 1985, with Ted Turner presenting the introduction. This was followed the next day by a broadcast of an episode of BBC documentary series Natural World, "On the Eighth Day", about nuclear winter, and a panel discussion on nuclear war. It was also shown in syndication to local commercial stations and, later, on many PBS stations. In Canada, Threads was broadcast on Citytv in Toronto, CKVU in Vancouver and CKND in Winnipeg, in New Zealand on TVNZ in September 1984, in Italy and Switzerland on Radiotelevisione Svizzera on 17 January 1985, in Japan on Thursday Night Movie Theater on 9 August 1985 and in Australia it was shown on the Nine Network on 19 June 1985. Unusually for a commercial network, it broadcast the film without commercial breaks; many commercial outlets in the United States and Canada that broadcast the film also did so without commercial interruption, or interrupting only for disclaimers or promos.

=== Home media ===
Threads was originally released by BBC Video (on VHS and, for a very short period, Betamax) in 1987 in the United Kingdom. The film was re-released on both VHS and DVD in 2000 on the Revelation label, followed by a new DVD edition in 2005. Due to licensing difficulties the 1987 release replaced Chuck Berry's recording of his song "Johnny B. Goode" with an alternative recording of the song. In all these cases, the original music over the opening narration was removed, again due to licensing problems; this was an extract from the Alpine Symphony by Richard Strauss, performed by the Dresden State Opera Orchestra, conducted by Rudolf Kempe (HMV ASD 3173).

On 13 February 2018, Threads was released by Severin Films on Blu-ray in the United States. The programme was scanned in 2K from a broadcast print for this release, including extras such as an audio commentary with director Mick Jackson and interviews with actress Karen Meagher, director of photography Andrew Dunn, production designer Christopher Robilliard and film writer Stephen Thrower. This is also the first home video release in which the extract from the Alpine Symphony remains intact.

On 9 April 2018, Simply Media released a special edition DVD in the UK, featuring a different 2K scan, restored and remastered from the original BBC 16mm CRI prints, which Severin did not have access to. This also featured all the original music, for the first time on home video in the UK. The special edition included commentaries and associated documentaries.

== Reception and legacy ==
=== Contemporary ===
Threads was not widely reviewed, but the critics who reviewed it gave generally positive reviews. John J. O'Connor of The New York Times wrote that the film "is not a balanced discussion about the pros and cons of nuclear armaments. It is a candidly biased warning. And it is, as calculated, unsettlingly powerful." Rick Groen of The Globe and Mail wrote that "[t]he British crew here, headed by writer Barry Hines and producer/director Mick Jackson, accomplish what would seem to be an impossible task: depicting the carnage without distancing the viewer, without once letting him retreat behind the safe wall of fictitious play. Formidable and foreboding, Threads leaves nothing to our imagination, and Nothingness to our conscience." In his movie guide, Leonard Maltin gave the film a rating of three stars (out of a possible four). He called Threads "Britain's answer to The Day After" and wrote that the film was "unrelentingly graphic and grim, sobering, and shattering – as it should be". One review of both productions stated, "Threads makes The Day After look like A Day at the Races."

Jackson recalled that while BBC productions would usually be followed by congratulatory phone calls from friends and colleagues immediately after airing, no such calls came after the first screening of Threads. Initially thinking that the film had been poorly received, he later realised that "people had switched off their TVs and just sat quietly thinking, in some cases too troubled to go to sleep or maybe not wanting to risk bad dreams". He stated that he had it on good authority that Ronald Reagan watched the film's American broadcast. A cartoon in The Times two days after the broadcast showed a couple reading a headline of "Reagan's peace speech" and asking, "Do you think he saw Threads?" Neil Kinnock, then Labour Party leader, wrote a letter to Jackson and Hines in which he thanked them for their "important and impressive work" and told them not to be worried by the possibility of viewers becoming inured to a potential nuclear war since "the dangers of complacency are much greater than any risks of knowledge".

=== Retrospective ===
Threads works on the viewer with a peculiar power: one finds oneself horrified, fascinated, numbed, provoked, unsettled, made restless. Its power may be the effect of its oscillation between form and content being so heavily weighted toward the pole of content—in this case, that threat of nuclear destruction which cannot help but feel 'real'—so that we are unable to relax into Threads as 'just' a movie.

— Professor Andrew Bartlett of UCLA

Retrospective reviews have been very positive. On Metacritic, the film has a score of 92 based on 5 reviews, indicating "universal acclaim", whilst it has a Rotten Tomatoes score of 100% based on 17 reviews (with an average score of 8.9/10). The critical consensus reads: "An urgent warning against nuclear conflict, Threads is a chilling hypothetical that achieves visceral horror with its matter-of-fact presentation of an apocalypse". Journalist Jude Rogers described Threads as: "the world's most harrowing film".

Peter Bradshaw of The Guardian called the film a "masterpiece", writing: "It wasn't until I saw Threads that I found that something on screen could make me break out in a cold, shivering sweat and keep me in that condition for 20 minutes, followed by weeks of depression and anxiety". Sam Toy of Empire gave the film a perfect score, writing that "this British work of (technically) science fiction teaches an unforgettable lesson in true horror" and went on to praise its ability "to create an almost impossible illusion on clearly paltry funds".

Jonathan Hatfull of SciFiNow gave a perfect score to the remastered DVD of the film. "No one ever forgets the experience of watching Threads. [... It] is arguably the most devastating piece of television ever produced. It's perfectly crafted, totally human and so completely harrowing you'll think that you'll probably never want to watch it again." He praised the pacing and Hines' "impeccable" screenplay and described its portrayal of the "immediate effects" of the bombing as "jaw-dropping [...] watching the survivors in the days and weeks to come is heart-breaking". Both Little White Lies and The A.V. Club have emphasized the film's contemporary relevance, especially in light of political events such as Brexit. According to the former, the film paints a "nightmarish picture of a Britain woefully unprepared for what is coming, and reduced, when it does come, to isolation, collapse and medieval regression, with a failed health service, very little food being harvested, mass homelessness, and the pound and the penny losing all value".

Cover of the Radio Times advertising Threads, showing extra Michael Beecroft as a bandaged traffic warden

Michael Beecroft was cast in the film as a traffic warden guarding an improvised detention camp. At the time, Beecroft was working as a traffic warden in real life. Even though he only appears for approximately thirty seconds in the finished film, still photography of his bandaged, rifle-wielding character was used to publicise the film's initial release (including a prominent appearance on the front cover of the 22–28 September 1984 issue of Radio Times), has regularly appeared in subsequent promotional material including the cover artwork on home video releases, and has endured in the popular memory to the point of an action figure being made, and people dressing up as the character for Halloween and convention cosplays. Beecroft's identity was unknown until 2024, when he was found by BBC Radio Sheffield as a result of a social media campaign by Craig Ian Mann (who made the making-of documentary accompanying the United States Blu-Ray release) and his co-writer Robert Nevitt; during the subsequent conversation with Mann, Beecroft was "gobsmacked" and "totally amazed" by the popular reaction to his brief role. The warden had previously been theorised as having been played by Kenneth Branagh (due to having a similar chin) or Andy Fenn-Rodgers (due to being credited on the film's IMDb page as a "Patrol Officer").

== Remake ==
In April 2025, it was announced that Warp Films, which had recently been involved with the critically and popularly successful miniseries Adolescence, had acquired the option to develop a serialised adaptation of Threads.

== Awards and nominations ==
The film was nominated for seven BAFTA awards in 1985. It won for Best Single Drama, Best Design, Best Film Cameraman and Best Film Editor. Its other nominations were for Best Costume Design, Best Make-Up, and Best Film Sound.

== See also ==
- Other fiction about nuclear and radiological attacks on Britain
  - The Bedsitting Room, a 1962 satirical play about the short-term aftermath of a nuclear attack which received a film adaptation in 1969
  - Riddley Walker, a 1980 novel taking place some two thousand years after a nuclear war and set in what used to be Kent
  - When the Wind Blows, a 1982 graphic novel about a nuclear attack as experienced by a retired couple which received an animated adaptation in 1986
  - Brother in the Land, a novel about a boy's struggle for survival in the aftermath of a nuclear attack, released in the same year as Threads
  - Dirty War, a 2004 film about a terrorist dirty bomb attack which, like Threads, was produced by the BBC
- Able Archer 83, NATO exercise that resulted in the 1983 nuclear war scare and changed thinking about nuclear war in Britain
- List of nuclear holocaust fiction
- Nuclear weapons in popular culture
- Nuclear weapons and the United Kingdom
- Square Leg, a British civil defence exercise with a partially similar scenario to that in Threads
- Protect and Survive, the British government information campaign depicted in Threads
- The Day After, a 1983 television film about a nuclear exchange between the US and the Soviet Union
- Z for Zachariah, a 1974 young adult novel about a teenage farm girl's survival in the aftermath of a nuclear war; a BBC Play for Today adaptation, transferring the setting from the United States to Wales, came out in the same year as Threads
- First Strike
- Dead Man's Letters, a 1986 Soviet art film about the aftermath of a nuclear war
- Testament, a 1983 film about nuclear war affecting a small US town in California
