= John Antrobus =

English playwright (1933–2025)

- Born: 2 July 1933 Woolwich, London, England
- Died: 16 December 2025 (aged 92)
- Occupation: Playwright; screenwriter
- Period: 1956–2025
- Genre: Comedy; drama; adventure
- Spouse: Margaret McCormick (divorced)
- Partner: Nicole Souchal

John Arthur Antrobus (2 July 1933 – 16 December 2025) was an English playwright and screenwriter. He wrote extensively for stage, screen, television and radio, including the epic World War II play Crete and Sergeant Pepper at the Royal Court. Antrobus authored the children's book series Ronnie, which includes Help! I am a Prisoner in a Toothpaste Factory.

== Life and career ==
=== Early years ===
John Arthur Antrobus was born in Woolwich, London, on 2 July 1933. His father was a regimental sergeant-major in the Royal Horse Artillery and the family was stationed at the School of Artillery in Larkhill on the edge of Salisbury Plain. After attending Bishop Wordsworth's School in Salisbury, Selhurst Grammar School in Croydon and King Edward VII Nautical College in London where he was an apprentice deck officer in the Merchant Navy from 1950 to 1952, Antrobus attended the Royal Military Academy Sandhurst, serving with the East Surrey Regiment from 1952 to 1955, but rebelled and dropped out of the army.

=== Career ===
After leaving the Army, spending time also working as a supply teacher and waiter, Antrobus pursued a future writing comedy, and went to Associated London Scripts (ALS), the writers' co-operative set up by Spike Milligan and Eric Sykes. Antrobus states "I met Spike in 1954 or 55. I had sent a sample script to Galton and Simpson and they took me on at Associated London Scripts." Antrobus and Milligan "wrote a couple of Goon Shows together. I wish I had done more of them with him but I wanted to be a playwright. I didn't realise they were golden times and how they gave life." The two shows were The Spon Plague, and The Great Statue Debate, both broadcast in March 1958.

At ALS, Antrobus also worked with Johnny Speight on The Frankie Howerd Show in 1956, After contributing material to the first Carry On film, Carry On Sergeant (1958), he wrote his first movie screenplay: for Idol on Parade (1959), starring Anthony Newley. During 1960 he worked with Milligan and Sykes in the second series of Sykes and A... (August-September 1960). He was also a contributing writer to the television series The Army Game, in the 1958 and 1961 shows, along with Larry Stephens, Maurice Wiltshire, and Lew Schwarz in 1958, and Brad Ashton, Barry Took, Marty Feldman and Wiltshire in 1961.

During the 1960s and 1970s, he provided scripts for television series as diverse as That Was the Week That Was, Television Playhouse and Spike Milligan's Milligan in... Antrobus wrote for Milligan's last radio series, The Milligan Papers, broadcast in 1987 and released in the BBC Radio Collection in 2002.

Antrobus' best known play is the surrealist satire The Bedsitting Room (1963) (co-written with Milligan). A film version was released in 1969 and a sequel from 1983. His other plays include Cane of Honour (1965), Captain Oates' Left Sock (1969), An Apple A Day (1970) and City Delights (1978). In October 2005, Antrobus and Ray Galton (with whom he had collaborated on the 1986 sitcom Room at the Bottom and Get Well Soon from 1997) unveiled their play Steptoe and Son – Murder at Oil Drum Lane at the Theatre Royal, York.

In 2010, Antrobus and Ray Galton's production of Not Tonight Caligula, originally written for Frankie Howerd, was recorded as a live radio play at The Leicester Square Theatre by The Wireless Theatre Company directed by Antrobus and starring Clive Greenwood in Howerd's role. In retirement, Antrobus still wrote and was involved in fringe productions and talent scouting.

=== Personal life and death ===
In 1958, Antrobus married Margaret (née McCormick). They had two sons and a daughter but later divorced. Antrobus died on 15 December 2025 at the age of 92.

== Writing credits ==
Production	Notes	Production company / Distributor or Broadcaster
Son of Fred	"Episode #1.1" (co-written with Dave Freeman, John Junkin, Maurice Wiltshire and Spike Milligan, 1956)	Associated-Rediffusion / ITV
Early to Braden	Unknown episodes (1957)	BBC Television
The April 8th Show (Seven Days Early)	Co-written with Alan Simpson, Johnny Speight and Ray Galton, 1958)	BBC Television
Carry On Sergeant	Feature film (co-written with Norman Hudis, 1958)	Peter Rogers / Anglo-Amalgamated
Idol on Parade	Feature film (1959)	Warwick / Columbia
Jazz Boat	Feature film (co-written with Ken Hughes and Rex Rienits, 1960)	Warwick / Columbia
Sykes and a...	"Sykes and a Library Book" (1960); "Sykes and a Cheque Book" (1960)	BBC Television
The Army Game	"The Kindest Man in Britain" (1960)	Granada Television / ITV
Bootsie and Snudge	"The Cemetery" (1961)	Granada Television / ITV
ITV Television Playhouse	"The Missing Links" (1961)	Associated-Rediffusion / ITV
That Was the Week That Was	Unknown episodes (1962)	BBC Television
The Wrong Arm of the Law	Feature film (co-written with Len Heath and Ray Galton, 1963)	British Lion Films
Room at the Bottom	"A Show for Monty" (1964); "It Came from Outer Hollywood" (1964); "The Show That Died of Shame" (1964); "A Job with the Other Lot" (1964)	ABC Weekend TV / ITV
A World of Comedy	"Don't Bank on It" (1965)	Rediffusion / ITV
The Big Job	Feature film (co-written with Talbot Rothwell, 1965)	Peter Rogers / Anglo-Amalgamated
Q9	"Episode #1.4" (co-written with Neil Shand and Spike Milligan, 1969)	BBC2
The Bed-Sitting Room	Feature film (1969)	Oscar Lewenstein / United Artists
The Dustbinmen	"Episode #3.7" (1970)	Granada Television / ITV
Oh In Colour	Unknown episodes (1970)	BBC1
Some Matters of Little Consequence	Unknown episode (1971)	BBC2
Ronnie Corbett in Bed	Sketch show (1971)	BBC1
An Apple a Day	Television film (1971)	BBC1
Milligan in...	"Milligan in Spring" (co-written with Chris Langham, Dick Vosburgh and Spike Milligan, 1973)	BBC2
Too Close for Comfort	"No Deposit, No Return" (1985)	D.L. Taffner / Metromedia for American Broadcasting Company (ABC)
Last Laugh Before TV-am	Television film (1985)	Ravel Productions / Channel Four
The Ratties	26 episodes (narration, 1987)	Central / ITV
Alfred Hitchcock Presents	"The Impatient Patient (1987)	Michael Sloan Productions / Universal Television
Room at the Bottom	13 episodes (co-written with Ray Galton, 1986–1988)	Yorkshire Television / ITV
The Dreamstone	"The Nightmare Stone" (co-written with Martin Gates, 1992); "Albert's Ailment" (co-written with Martin Gates, 1992); "Return of the Nightmare Stone" (co-written with Martin Gates, 1992)	Central / ITV
Carry On Columbus	Feature film (co-written with Dave Freeman, 1992)	Island World / Comedy House / Peter Rogers
Get Well Soon	6 episodes (1997)	BBC1

== Awards and nominations ==
Year	Award	Work	Category	Result	Reference
1970	Hugo Award	The Bed-Sitting Room	Best Dramatic Presentation (with Richard Lester, Charles Wood and Spike Milligan)	Nominated	

== See also ==
- List of British playwrights since 1950

== Publications ==
- Antrobus, John (1965). You'll Come To Love Your Sperm Test (Playscript) in 'New Writers 4' . London: Calder and Boyars. First produced Edinburgh, 1964.
- Antrobus, John (1969). Trixie and Baba (Playscript 22). London: Calder and Boyars. ISBN 978-0-7145-0058-4. First produced Royal Court Theatre, London, 1968. Televised 1971.
- Antrobus, John (1970). Why Bournemouth? and Other Plays (Playscripts). London: Calder Publications. ISBN 978-0-7145-0641-8. First produced, Almost Free, London, 1968
- Milligan, Spike; Antrobus, John (1973). The Bedsitting Room. London: Tandem. First published in Great Britain by Margaret & Jack Hobbs, 1970. Published by Universal-Tandem Publishing Co Ltd, 1972. 1970 Spike Milligan and John Antrobus.
- Antrobus, John (1974). Captain Oates' Left Sock (Playscript). London: Samuel French. First produced Royal Court Theatre, 1969
- Antrobus, John (1978). Help! I am a Prisoner in a Toothpaste Factory. London: Robson Books. ISBN 978-0-340-25359-5.
- Antrobus, John (1983). Hitler in Liverpool (Playscript). London: Calder and Boyars. First produced Gate Theatre, Notting Hill, London, 1980
- Antrobus, John (1983). One Orange for the Baby (Playscript). London: Calder and Boyars. First produced Gate Theatre, Notting Hill, London, 1980
- Antrobus, John (1983). Up in the Hide (Playscript). London: Calder and Boyars. First produced Gate Theatre, Notting Hill, London, 1980
- Antrobus, John (1988). When Did You Last See Your Trousers? (Playscript). London: Samuel French. First produced, Mold, Clwyd, 1986.
- Antrobus, John (1988). The Boy With Illuminated Measles. UK: Knight. ISBN 978-0-340-25360-1.
- Antrobus, John (1998). Ronnie and the High Rise. London: Robson. ISBN 978-0-86051-621-7.
- Antrobus, John (1999). Ronnie and the Flying Fitted Carpet. London: Robson. ISBN 978-0-86051-822-8.
- Antrobus, John (2002). Surviving Spike Milligan: A Voyage Through the Mind & Mirth of the Master Goon. London: Robson Books. ISBN 0-246-12275-7.
- {{cite book | last = Antrobus| first = John| title = River to The Sea: |year = 2022
- {{cite book | last = Antrobus| first = John| title = Milligan Papers: |year = 2021
- {{cite book | last = Antrobus| first = John| title = Goon But Not Forgotten: |year = 2021
- {{cite book | last = Antrobus| first = John| title = Three Plays For The Stage: |year = 2022
- {{cite book | last = Antrobus| first = John| title = Invitation to A Plague: |year = 2020
- {{cite book | last = Antrobus| first = John| title = Horse Mutiny: |year = PENDING
- {{cite book | last = Antrobus| first = John| title = Pop Up Theatre: |year = PENDING
- {{cite book | last = Antrobus| first = John| title = Surviving Spike Milligan: REPRINT: |year = PENDING
- {{cite book | last = Antrobus| first = John| title = That Was The War That Was: two war plays: |year = PENDING
