= Brother in the Land =

1984 novel by Robert Swindells

- First edition
- Author: Robert Swindells
- Language: English
- Genre: Young adult post-apocalyptic novel
- Publisher: Oxford University Press
- Publication date: 1984
- Publication place: United Kingdom
- Media type: Print (hardcover & paperback)
- Pages: 151
- ISBN: 0-19-271491-0
- OCLC: 12470878

Brother in the Land is a 1984 post-apocalyptic novel by the British author Robert E. "Bob" Swindells. The plot follows the adventures of a teenage boy as he struggles to survive in the north of England after a nuclear war has devastated the country.

== Plot summary ==
The narrative begins on a hillside, where the protagonist, Danny Lodge, encounters a man in a radiation suit, who steals his bike and orders him to return to his home town, the fictional Yorkshire town of Skipley. Arriving there, Danny finds the town in ruins, and learns that his family's shop has collapsed, killing his mother. His brother Ben and their father have survived, as they were in the cellar, which is used as a stockroom. With so much food in their stockroom, the Lodges have plenty to live on, but as the weeks pass, other people begin fighting over food. Shortly after the war, Danny meets a girl named Kim.

The local Commissioner issues an order that the injured and infirm are to be taken out of the town and placed at the roadside so they can be taken to hospital: this turns out to be a front for his secret plan to kill off those who will be a burden. After a while, the Commissioner implements a system of food and fuel rationing, with severe penalties introduced for hoarding. The injured, elderly, and people who have been emotionally traumatised by the nuclear attack are given poisoned rations. Mr Lodge refuses to allow his stock to be used for this purpose and, though Danny and Ben register for ration cards, they only visit the local feeding centre once.

Presently, the Commissioner's men come to the shop and arrest Mr Lodge. The lorry bearing Mr Lodge explodes, killing everyone on board, and leaving Danny and Ben orphans. The brothers seek sanctuary at the home of Sam Branwell, a smallholder who, along with several other survivors, has formed a resistance movement called Masada, an acronym for "Movement to Arm Skipley Against Dictatorial Authority" and an allusion to the historic siege. Masada has the aim of overthrowing the Commissioner and preventing the creation of a feudal society; its other members include Keith Rhodes (who was responsible for blowing up the lorry), Danny's former P.E. teacher, and Kim Tyson.

The protagonists discover that a concentration camp has been erected on a farm outside of Skipley, with the remaining able-bodied population being used as slave labour under the Commissioner's rule. Members of Masada decide to step up their campaign of resistance, and launch a night raid on the camp. After a battle, the Commissioner is overthrown and Branwell is established as the new leader. In the months after the raid, all the newly planted crops fail due to radiation damage. Kim's sister Maureen has become pregnant, and Kim is worried that the baby may be deformed; ultimately, the child is born without a mouth, and dies not long afterwards.

Foreign troops arrive by helicopter, revealing there to be survivor communities all over Europe. Believing the Swiss troops will rescue them, the camp foolishly eat many of their rations. In fact, the Swiss confiscate their weapons and disable the few vehicles they have. By now, the camp's food supplies are exhausted, forcing the people to scavenge for whatever they can find, and many are dying. Gradually, people start to leave in small groups to fend for themselves. Shortly after Branwell dies from exhaustion during the second winter after the war, Danny, Kim and Ben leave the camp and head to Holy Island, where Danny hopes they will be safe.

During the journey to Holy Island, they encounter a group on motorbikes, including Rhodes. Kim shoots Rhodes and another biker as they are about to shoot Danny in order to steal his food. Ben gradually becomes ill and dies of acute radiation syndrome; Danny and Kim bury his body in the garden of an empty house. Inside the house, Danny finds a ledger, and starts writing an account of his experiences after the war. He ends by saying that he plans to leave his account behind for future generations to read, hoping it will warn them not to go down the path which led to nuclear war. Finally, Danny dedicates his story to Ben, his "brother in the land".

In 1994, the book was reprinted with an additional, final chapter. In this revised ending, Ben still dies, but, rather than leave his account behind, Danny takes the ledger with him to Holy Island. Kim is expecting a baby, the fourth of Holy Island, with Danny being the father. If the baby survives, it will be named after Ben.

== Reception ==
In his review for Bookmarks Magazine, Adam Brown wrote that "every page is filled with the horrors of trying to live after such an cataclysmic event ... the story does not hold back in its portrayal of the ailments and the hardships faced by the children ... absorbing and heartbreaking, this novel will stay with you forever". Anne Connor wrote in the School Library Journal that Swindells "narration has immediacy and great impact ... while grim and painful to read, it is not preachy or heavy-handed, an improvement over most doomsday science fiction".

== See also ==
- Other fiction about nuclear and radiological attacks on Britain
  - The Bedsitting Room, a 1962 satirical play about the short-term aftermath of a nuclear attack which received a film adaptation in 1969
  - The War Game, a 1966 film about a nuclear attack and its short-term aftermath
  - Riddley Walker, a 1980 novel taking place some two thousand years after a nuclear war and set in what used to be Kent
  - When the Wind Blows, a 1982 graphic novel about a nuclear attack as experienced by a retired couple which received an animated adaptation in 1986
  - Threads, a film about a nuclear attack and its long-term aftermath which came out in the same year as Brother in the Land
  - Dirty War, a 2004 film about a terrorist dirty bomb attack
- List of nuclear holocaust fiction
- Nuclear weapons in popular culture
- Nuclear weapons and the United Kingdom
- Z for Zachariah, a 1974 young adult novel about a teenage farm girl's survival in the aftermath of a nuclear war; a BBC Play for Today adaptation, transferring the setting from the United States to Wales, would come out in the same year as Brother in the Land
- The Day After, a 1983 television film about a nuclear exchange between the US and the Soviet Union
- Dead Man's Letters, a 1986 Soviet art film about the aftermath of a nuclear war
- Testament, a 1983 film about nuclear war affecting a small town in California, USA
