= When the Wind Blows (1986 film) =

1986 British animated film

- British theatrical release poster
- Directed by: Jimmy T. Murakami
- Written by: Raymond Briggs
- Based on: When the Wind Blows by Raymond Briggs
- Produced by: John Coates
- Starring: Peggy Ashcroft; John Mills
- Edited by: John Cary
- Music by: Roger Waters
- Production companies: Meltdown Productions; British Screen; Film Four International; TVC London; Penguin Books
- Distributed by: Recorded Releasing Company
- Release date: 24 October 1986 (United Kingdom)
- Running time: 84 minutes
- Country: United Kingdom
- Language: English
- Box office: $5,274

When the Wind Blows is a 1986 British adult animated anti-war film directed by Jimmy Murakami based on the 1982 graphic novel by Raymond Briggs. It stars the voices of John Mills and Peggy Ashcroft as the two main characters and was scored by Roger Waters. The film recounts an elderly couple's attempt to survive a nuclear attack and maintain a sense of normality in fallout and nuclear winter.

== Plot ==
Jim Bloggs and his wife Hilda are a retired aging couple, living in an isolated cottage in rural Sussex, England. Jim frequently travels to the local town to read newspapers and keep abreast of the deteriorating international situation regarding the Soviet–Afghan War, which is threatening to escalate into a nuclear conflict between the Western Allies and the Soviet Union.

Hearing a radio news report stating that a war may be only days away, Jim follows the instructions outlined in the government-issued Protect and Survive pamphlets to build a fallout shelter, including covering the windows with white paint and readying sacks to lie down in when a nuclear strike hits. Jim and Hilda are confident they can survive, as they did the Second World War, and that a Soviet defeat will ensue.

As a radio transmission warns of an imminent ICBM strike and civil defence sirens sound, the couple rush to their shelter, just escaping as distant shock waves batter their home. They emerge after a few nights to find all utilities, services, and communications destroyed. Jim (incorrectly) speculates that most have temporarily ceased because of "wartime measures".

The couple remains stoic and tries to resume their daily routine, preparing tea and dinners on a camping stove, noting numerous errands they will have to run once the crisis passes, and trying to renew their evaporated water stock with rainwater. Fallout dust is visible in the air throughout the house. Jim believes that a rescue operation will soon be launched to help civilians.

The couple venture outside, where radioactive ash has blocked out the sun and caused heavy fog. They are oblivious to the dead and dying animals strewn across the landscape, the destroyed buildings of the nearby town, and the scorched vegetation outside their cottage. Their optimism begins to fade in response to their prolonged isolation, lack of food and water, and growing radiation sickness, and the absence of communication from the authorities.

Jim worries that the Soviets will soon invade, experiencing a vision where a Soviet soldier breaks into their house. Hilda, whose symptoms are worsening, encounters a rat in the dried toilet, which traumatises her. Coupled with her worsening symptoms - bloody diarrhea, bleeding gums - she begins to lose hope. Jim tries to comfort her, still optimistic that he may be able to get medications for her from the chemist.

After a few days, the Bloggs are practically bedridden, and Hilda is despondent when her hair begins to fall out. Jim clings to his belief that emergency services will arrive. Hilda suggests they lie down in the paper sacks. Jim, now resigned to their fate, agrees. As they crawl into the sacks Jim tries reciting prayers, including Psalm 23, but, forgetting the lines, starts to read "The Charge of the Light Brigade", whose militaristic and ironic undertones distress the dying Hilda, who weakly asks him not to continue. Finally, Jim's voice mumbles away into silence as he finishes the line, "...rode the Six Hundred..." Outside, the smoke and ash-filled sky begins to clear, revealing the sun rising through the gloom. Towards the end of the credits, a Morse code signal taps out "MAD" - mutually assured destruction.

== Cast ==
- Peggy Ashcroft as Hilda Bloggs
- John Mills as Jim Bloggs
- Robin Houston as Radio 4 Announcer
- James Russell as Russian submariner
- David Dundas as Additional Voice
- Matt Irving as Additional Voice

== Production ==
The film was Briggs' second collaboration with TVC, after their efforts with a special based on another work of his, The Snowman, in 1982. A subsequent graphic novel by Briggs, Ethel and Ernest (1998), makes it clear that Briggs based the protagonist couple in When the Wind Blows on his own parents.

When the Wind Blows is a hybrid of traditional and stop-motion animation. The characters of Jim and Hilda Bloggs are hand-drawn, as well as the area outside of the Bloggs' house, but their home and most of the objects in it are real objects that seldom move but are animated with stop motion when they do. The stop motion environments utilised are based on the style used for the Protect and Survive public information films. "Protect And Survive" is also featured as the booklet that Jim takes instructions from to survive the nuclear attack.

== Soundtrack ==
The soundtrack album features music by David Bowie (who performed the title song), Roger Waters, Genesis, Squeeze, Hugh Cornwell and Paul Hardcastle.

Originally, David Bowie was supposed to contribute several songs to the soundtrack for the film, but he decided to pull out so he could focus on his upcoming album Never Let Me Down, and instead only submitted the title track. Roger Waters was brought in to complete the project instead.

When the Wind Blows

Soundtrack album by Various artists, Roger Waters and The Bleeding Heart Band
- Released: 16 May 1986
- Recorded: Winter 1985
- Length: 84 minutes
- Label: Virgin
- Producers: Roger Waters; David Bowie; Hugh Cornwell; Peter Hammond; Paul Hardcastle; Squeeze

Roger Waters chronology
The Pros and Cons of Hitch Hiking (1984)	When the Wind Blows (1986)	Radio K.A.O.S. (1987)

Singles from When the Wind Blows
- 1. "When the Wind Blows" Released: 27 October 1986

Professional ratings
Review scores
Source	Rating
AllMusic	3/5 stars

=== Track listing ===
All tracks written by Roger Waters and performed by Waters and The Bleeding Heart Band except where noted. On some versions of the album, the Roger Waters tracks are all put into one 24:26 song. The lyrics to the closing song, "Folded Flags", feature a reference to the song "Hey Joe" in the lines "Hey Joe, where you goin' with that gun in your hand?" and "Hey Joe, where you goin' with that dogma in your head?"

1. "When the Wind Blows" (lyrics: Bowie; music: Bowie, Erdal Kızılçay) – 3:35
  - Performed by David Bowie
2. "Facts And Figures" (Hugh Cornwell) – 4:19
  - Performed by Hugh Cornwell
3. "The Brazilian" (Tony Banks, Phil Collins, Mike Rutherford) – 4:51
  - Performed by Genesis
4. "What Have They Done?" (Chris Difford, Glenn Tilbrook) – 3:39
  - Performed by Squeeze
5. "The Shuffle" (Paul Hardcastle) – 4:16
  - Performed by Paul Hardcastle
6. "The Russian Missile" – 0:10
7. "Towers of Faith" – 7:00
8. "Hilda's Dream" – 1:36
9. "The American Bomber" – 0:07
10. "The Anderson Shelter" – 1:13
11. "The British Submarine" – 0:14
12. "The Attack" – 2:53
13. "The Fall Out" – 2:04
14. "Hilda's Hair" – 4:20
15. "Folded Flags" – 4:51

=== Personnel ===
The Bleeding Heart Band

- Roger Waters – bass guitar, acoustic guitar, vocals on "Towers of Faith" and "Folded Flags"
- Jay Stapley – guitar
- John Gordon – bass guitar
- Matt Irving – keyboards, organ
- Nick Glennie-Smith – piano, organ
- John Lingwood – Linn programming
- Freddie Krc – drums, percussion
- Mel Collins – saxophone
- Clare Torry – backing vocals on "Towers of Faith"
- Paul Carrack – keyboards and vocals on "Folded Flags"

== Release ==
When the Wind Blows was distributed by Recorded Releasing in the UK, and by Kings Road Entertainment in the United States. In one theatre, it grossing $5,274 at the box office in 1988.

=== Home media ===
The film was released on VHS in the United Kingdom by CBS/Fox Video after its theatrical run, and later on laserdisc. After its short theatrical run in the United States, it was released on VHS by International Video Entertainment and on laserdisc by Image Entertainment. It was released on DVD in 2005 by Channel 4, with 0 region coding: the official UK DVD is still PAL format. The film was re-released on DVD in September 2010, again by Channel 4; it is formatted in NTSC and All region coding. In the United States it was released on Blu-ray on 11 November 2014 by Twilight Time in a limited edition of 3000, and in the United Kingdom, a dual-format release containing both the DVD and Blu-ray version was released on 22 January 2018 by the BFI. Severin Films released another Blu-ray and a DVD of the movie in the United States through their Severin Kids label on 21 April 2020.

== Reception ==
When the Wind Blows received positive reviews, currently having an 88% rating on Rotten Tomatoes based on 8 reviews. Critic Barry Lappin called it "Absolutely brilliant.... It was very subtly done but the message more than gets through well". He explained that the scenes are "more than touching" and encouraged people to watch it to the very end.

Colin Greenland reviewed When the Wind Blows for White Dwarf #85, and stated that "The story of Jim and Hilda Bloggs preparing for the Bomb and trying to get back to normal afterwards is heavy-handed, especially at the end, and would have been better shorter; there are odd continuity problems between the pictures and the dialogue. But it is powerful, ludicrous and shocking. It gets to you. As it ought to."

== See also ==
- Other fiction about nuclear and radiological attacks on Britain
  - The Bedsitting Room, a 1962 satirical play about the short-term aftermath of a nuclear attack which received a film adaptation in 1969
  - The War Game, a 1966 film about a nuclear attack and its short-term aftermath
  - Riddley Walker, a 1980 novel taking place some two thousand years after a nuclear war and set in what used to be Kent
  - Z for Zachariah, a 1984 BBC Play for Today adaptation of the 1974 novel about a girl's survival in the aftermath of a nuclear war, the Play for Today adaptation takes place in Wales rather than the original novel's United States setting
  - Brother in the Land, a 1984 novel about a boy's struggle for survival in the aftermath of a nuclear attack
  - Threads, a 1984 film about a nuclear attack and its long-term aftermath
  - Dirty War, a 2004 film about a terrorist dirty bomb attack
- List of animated feature-length films
- List of nuclear holocaust fiction
- The Day After (1983 film)
- Grave of the Fireflies (1988 film)
- Protect and Survive, the public information campaign that is depicted in When the Wind Blows
