= Nuclear Holocausts: Atomic War in Fiction =

1987 book

Nuclear Holocausts: Atomic War in Fiction, 1895–1984
- Author: Paul Brians
- Language: English
- Subject: Fiction; Nuclear warfare Bibliography; Science fiction
- Publisher: Kent State University Press
- Publication date: 1987
- Publication place: United States
- Media type: Book
- Pages: 398
- ISBN: 0-87338-335-4
- OCLC: 13581546
- Dewey Decimal: 016.823/91/080358 19
- LC Class: Z5917.N83 B74 1987 PN3352.N83

Nuclear Holocausts: Atomic War in Fiction, 1895–1984 was written by Paul Brians and published in 1987. This comprehensive study covers nuclear holocaust fiction published in English-language works between 1895 and 1984. Brians notes that 1895 marked the first appearance of an atomic weapon in fiction: Robert Cromie's Crack of Doom. The latter date marks the conclusion of this study's time span.

Brians' work examines only fiction actually depicting nuclear war and its aftermath. He does not include works of "future holocaust" where the triggering incident is not fully explained in the work. The included bibliography covers over 800 items, including novels, stories, and films from the post-holocaust genre. The included titles are arranged by author and include a brief synopsis of each work. The author has provided an online version of the published work, complete with updated sources.

== Reception ==
Joe Dewey positively reviewed it for MFS Modern Fiction Studies in 1988, noting that "Brians' fulsome bibliography represents a valuable achievement". Paul Boyer reviewed this book for Technology and Culture in 1989. His review was also positive, concluding that Brain's work is a "thoughtful and exhaustive examination" of the topic. Alexander H. McIntire who reviewed this work the same year for the Science Fiction Studies was likewise impressed, writing that "Brians provides a treasure trove: 250 pages of extensively annotated bibliography, arranged by author’s surname, and consisting of all the works mentioned in the narrative and hundreds more. This bibliography of 800 entries, supplemented by full title and subject indexes, is reason enough to make Holocausts a part of any SF scholar’s personal reference library."
