= The Milligan Papers =

British radio program

The Milligan Papers is a BBC Radio comedy show. It was written by John Antrobus and starring Spike Milligan. First broadcast on BBC Radio 4 in 1987, it also featured Chris Langham, John Bluthal, and Antrobus, and is often referred to as A Goon Show for the '80s. It was produced by Paul Spencer.

In 2018, to commemorate Spike's centenary, theatre company Hambledon Productions adapted a selection of episodes for a rural tour.

== Airdates And Show Names ==
- 28 Jan 1987: The Incredible Case of the Vanishing Flying Scotsman
- 4 Feb 1987: Jonah And The Whale
- 11 Feb 1987: From Rags to More Rags
- 18 Feb 1987: That "Cake" Elusive Pimpernel
- 25 Feb 1987: The Incurables, Part 1
- 4 Mar 1987: The Incurables, Part 2
