= The Bedsitting Room (play) =

1963 play by Spike Milligan and John Antrobus

- Cover of paperback publication of play script
- Author: Spike Milligan and John Antrobus
- Publisher: Tandem
- Publication date: 1973
- Pages: 96

The Bedsitting Room is a satirical play by Spike Milligan and John Antrobus. It began as a one-act play which was first produced on 12 February 1962 at the Marlowe Theatre in Canterbury, England. The Bedsitting Room was then adapted to a longer play and Bernard Miles put it on at the Mermaid Theatre, where it was first performed on 31 January 1963 before transferring several weeks later to the Duke of York's Theatre in London's West End. A further transfer to the Comedy Theatre happened on the 4th March, playing eighty-eight performances, running until the 18th May.

All plays at this time had to be approved by the Lord Chamberlain's office. The alterations and censorship demanded by the Lord Chamberlain to permit performance of The Bedsitting Room were reprinted in the That Was The Week That Was book (1963), and again in Kenneth Tynans essay "The Royal Smut-Hound" (1966). The published script shows that all the requested changes were accepted.

The production included a coup de théâtre, when the character "Mate" (originally played in London by Spike Milligan) entered wearing a mixture of ragged military uniforms from across the centuries. Attached to his boots were long strips of canvas to which were attached pairs of boots. As he marched across the stage, the empty boots marched in time behind him. The play was considered a critical and commercial hit, and was revived in 1967 with a provincial tour, before opening at London's Saville Theatre on 3 May 1967. The script was later published in paperback book.

The play was presented in repertory by the Theatre Royal, York in 1972, and was also shown by Bench Theatre in Havant for seven nights in July 1981.

The play is set in a post-apocalyptic London, nine months after World War III (the "Nuclear Misunderstanding"), which lasted for two minutes and twenty-eight seconds – "including the signing of the peace treaty". Nuclear fallout is producing strange mutations in people; the title refers to the character Lord Fortnum, who finds himself transforming into a bed-sitting room (other characters turn into a parrot and a wardrobe). The plot concerns the fate of the first child to be born after the war.

A film based on the play was released in 1969. The film was directed by Richard Lester and the cast included Ralph Richardson, Arthur Lowe, Rita Tushingham, Peter Cook, Dudley Moore, Michael Hordern, Marty Feldman, Harry Secombe and Milligan himself.

== Authors' intentions ==
In his 2002 book of reflections, Antrobus describes his idea as about "a man who fears he will turn into a bedsitting room, which he does, and the dubious doctor he has been seeing moves in with his fiancée, declaring that it will be easier to work a cure on the premises. Therein lies the dilemma. For the doctor to heal the condition would mean becoming homeless."

In a 1988 interview with Bernard Braden on ITV's All Our Yesterdays, Milligan portrayed his view of The Bedsitting Room thus:

Nobody ever got the point about what it was about. What we were trying to say through all this laughter and fun, was that if they dropped the bomb on a major civilisation, the moment the cloud had dispersed and sufficient people had died, the survivors would set up all over again and have Barclays Bank, Barclay cards, garages, hates, cinemas and all...just go right back to square one. I think man has no option but to continue his own stupidity.

== Original cast list for play ==
The following is the original cast list as it appears on page 5 of the 1973 paperback of the script, with music played by The Temperance Seven.

- Captain Pontius Kak, Graham Stark. This is Lord Fortnum's doctor, whose name appears to have later changed to Captain Martin. At one time Barry Humphries played this role, which he names as Captain Martin Bules.
- Lord Fortnum of Alamein, Valentine Dyall
- Mate/Arthur Scroake, Spike Milligan
- Shelter Man, John Bluthal
- Plastic Mac Man, John Bluthal
- Underwater Vicar, John Bluthal
- Brigadier/Sergeant, John Bluthal
- Chest of Drawers/Gladys Scroake, Marjie Lawrence
- Penelope, Marjie Lawrence
- Diplomat, Bob Todd
- First Announcer, Bob Todd
- Sea Captain, Bob Todd
- Second Announcer, Johnny Vyvyan
- Delivery Man/Chauffeur, Johnny Vyvyan
- Seaman, Johnny Vyvyan
- Coffin Man, Clive Elliott
- Pianist, Alan Chase
- Third Announcer, Bill Kerr
- Extras:
  - Phantom
  - Old Soldier
  - Orderly

== Literary and dramatic counterparts ==
The Bedsitting Room can be compared with The Goon Show, in which Milligan and Secombe were involved, but with a savage, cynical and even more surreal edge, and an existential despair. It is widely cited that a critic described it as being "like Samuel Beckett, but with better jokes", but this quote is never attributed to a particular author. However, in his review of the BFI's DVD and Blu-ray release of the film in The Guardian, Phelim O'Neill says, "It's a bleak and funny mix of music hall gags and Samuel Beckett-style existentialism".

== Radio adaptation ==
A radio adaptation was broadcast on BBC Radio 4 on 26 December 2015 featuring Paul Merton, Derek Jacobi, Bernard Cribbins and Catherine Tate.

== See also ==
- The Bed Sitting Room (film)
- Other fiction about nuclear and radiological attacks on Britain
  - The War Game, a 1966 film about a nuclear attack and its short-term aftermath
  - Riddley Walker, a 1980 novel taking place some two thousand years after a nuclear war and set in what used to be Kent
  - When the Wind Blows, a 1982 graphic novel about a nuclear attack as experienced by a retired couple which received an animated adaptation in 1986
  - Z for Zachariah, a 1984 BBC Play for Today adaptation of the 1974 novel about a girl's survival in the aftermath of a nuclear war; the Play for Today adaptation takes place in Wales rather than the original novel's United States setting
  - Brother in the Land, a 1984 novel about a boy's struggle for survival in the aftermath of a nuclear attack
  - Threads, a 1984 film about a nuclear attack and its long-term aftermath
  - Dirty War, a 2004 film about a terrorist dirty bomb attack
