= Emergency services in London =

Several different emergency service organisations operate in London.

== List of organisations ==
Organisation	Founded	Description
Metropolitan Police	1829	Led efforts to oppose the Provisional IRA in Great Britain.
London Fire Brigade	1833	
City of London Police	1837	
British Transport Police	1949	Police Channel Tunnel, the London Underground, the Docklands Light Railway, Tramlink, and the London cable car.
London Ambulance Service	1909	
Port of London Authority	1909	
Transport for London	2000	London Underground emergency response unit founded in 1993.

== London Emergency Services Liaison Panel ==
The London Emergency Services Liaison Panel (LESLP) is a body that exists to promote coordination between the emergency services operating in London.

The LESLP was founded in 1973, and consists of representatives from the following agencies:

- Metropolitan Police
- London Fire Brigade
- City of London Police
- British Transport Police
- London Ambulance Service (NHS Trust)
- HM Coastguard (London)
- Port of London Authority
- All London local authorities (City of London Corporation, London boroughs)
- Military (Joint Regional Liaison Officer)
- Transport for London
- London Resilience Group
