= When the Wind Blows (comics) =

1982 graphic novel by Raymond Briggs

- First edition (publ. Hamish Hamilton)
- Author: Raymond Briggs
- Publication date: 1982
- ISBN: 0241107210

When the Wind Blows is a 1982 apocalyptic graphic novel, created by British artist Raymond Briggs, commonly known for its critiques against government-issued preparations for nuclear war. Utilizing a cartoonish design, this graphic novel follows a retired couple, Jim and Hilda Bloggs, and their experience of a nuclear attack on Great Britain launched by the Soviet Union and its aftermath. The novel was later adapted for different entertainment types including an animated film, radio play, and stage play.

== Plot ==
The book follows the story of the Bloggs, a couple previously seen in the book Gentleman Jim. One afternoon, the couple hears a message on the radio about an "outbreak of hostilities" in three days time. Jim immediately starts construction of a fallout shelter (in accordance with a government-issued Protect and Survive brochure, which he has collected from a public library), while the two reminisce about the Second World War. Their reminiscences are used both for comic effect and to show how the geopolitical situation has changed, but also how nostalgia has blotted out the horrors of war. A constant theme is Jim's optimistic outlook and his unshakeable belief that the government knows what is best and has the situation under full control, coupled with Hilda's attempts to carry on life as normal.

During their preparations, the action is interrupted by two-page dark illustrations, the first being a nuclear missile on a launch pad, labelled "MEANWHILE, ON A DISTANT PLAIN....", the second a squadron of Warthogs, labelled "MEANWHILE, IN THE DISTANT SKY....", and third a nuclear submarine labelled "MEANWHILE, IN A DISTANT OCEAN...."

The Bloggs soon hear of enemy missiles heading towards England and make it into their shelter before a nuclear explosion. They spend all the first day within the fallout shelter; on the second day, however, they start suffering from aches and pains in their bodies and still feeling tired, hinting that they have already started being exposed to radiation. They start moving about the house, exposing themselves to more radioactive fallout. Undaunted, they try to continue life as normal, as if it was the Second World War again. They find the house to be in shambles, with both the water and the electricity cut off. On the third day, misreading advice given in government leaflets, they come to believe that they must stay in the fallout shelter for just two days rather than two weeks. Thus, they go outside, to find that their garden and likely the whole area has essentially been reduced to a wasteland with dead trees and grass in their garden, and that there are no sounds such as the trains that would usually be running; Hilda also wonders if the bomb has caused the nice weather, as the day is bright, hot and near-cloudless (different from the nuclear winter seen in the film). The two remark how quiet it is, and notice a "terrible smell of burning... like roast meat."

Jim and Hilda exhibit considerable confusion regarding the serious nature of what has happened after the nuclear attack; they repeatedly state that they should go out and purchase supplies, and seem oblivious to the fact that everyone they know has probably died. As the novel progresses and their emergency water supply runs out, they resort to collecting rainwater. Though they are wise to boil it, it is still contaminated with radiation, and thus their situation becomes steadily more hopeless, as they begin to suffer effects of radiation sickness. At first they suffer headaches and shivering, moments after the bomb. Then, from the second day, Hilda suffers from vomiting and diarrhoea. On the fourth day, Hilda's gums begin to bleed, and she finds blood in her diarrhoea, which they mistake for haemorrhoids. On the fifth day, Jim also shows bleeding gums; both are suffering blue bruising but mistake these for varicose veins. Finally, Hilda's hair begins to fall out. From then on, she insists that they go back into the fallout shelter and wait for help to arrive.

The book ends on a bleak night, the dying couple lying down to rest when Hilda insists Jim, who has now lost the last of his optimism, should pray; he begins uttering phrases from Psalm 23, which pleases Hilda. However, forgetting the lines, he switches to The Charge of the Light Brigade. Distressed, Hilda weakly asks him not to continue. Finally, James's voice mumbles away into silence as he finishes the line, "...rode the Six Hundred..."

== Adaptations ==
=== Film ===
The book was made into an animated film by director Jimmy Murakami in 1986. The couple are voiced by Sir John Mills and Dame Peggy Ashcroft. The soundtrack consists of songs, many with an anti-nuclear theme, by prominent rock musicians and groups, including Roger Waters, Genesis and David Bowie.

=== Radio ===
There was also a BBC Radio 4 dramatisation in 1983, with the voices of Peter Sallis and Brenda Bruce, directed by John Tydeman. The programme won the Broadcasting Press Guild award for the most outstanding radio programme of 1983.

A Hungarian-language version was broadcast on Kossuth Rádió in Hungary in 1988, with Imre Sinkovits voicing Jim and Klári Tolnay voicing Hilda.

=== Stage ===
When the Wind Blows was adapted for the stage in 1983 by Samuel French Inc., one year after its original comic publication. Concord Theatrics, the parent company to Samuel French Inc., has gone on to adapt other books to plays, such as Animal Farm by George Orwell. The earliest known date for script publication is December 1, 1983, and it has since been performed several times.

== Other appearances ==
- The book was mentioned in UK parliamentary discussions, and used to support unilateral disarmament.
- "Mothers Talk", a 1984 song by the British pop group Tears for Fears, was partly influenced by the book: the band's composer Roland Orzabal declared: "The song stems from two ideas. One is something that mothers say to their children about pulling faces. They say the child will stay like that when the wind changes. The other idea is inspired by [...] When The Wind Blows."
- Licensed images from When the Wind Blows appear in the short book Sussex After the Bomb – What Will Happen to Newhaven, Lewes, The Ouse Valley, Seaford, Eastbourne and Brighton published by The Profession for Peace (1984).
- Both Jim and Hilda later appear in the 1991 animated film, Father Christmas as background characters enjoying a drink in a Scottish pub.
- The lyrics to the Mansun B-side track "When the Wind Blows" are based on the graphic novel.
- The Iron Maiden song "When the Wild Wind Blows" from their 2010 album The Final Frontier is loosely based on the graphic novel. In the song, however, the couple commit suicide thinking the tremors shaking up their hideout are the nuclear doomsday they had been expecting. They are found like this by a rescue team going through the ruins after what was "merely" a strong earthquake, on "just another day the wild wind blows".

== Critique of preparations for nuclear war ==
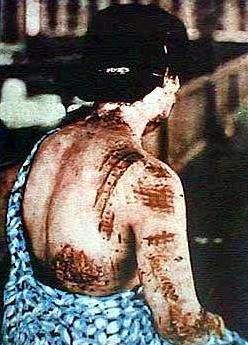
After the bombing of Hiroshima, people with patterned clothes were burned where the pattern was darkest.

The two pamphlets mentioned in When the Wind Blows are based on actual public information series such as Protect and Survive. These sorts of pamphlets go back as far as 1938, when the British government put out a leaflet, The Protection of Your Home Against Air Raids. It was updated after the Second World War to Advising the Householder on Protection against Nuclear Attack which was originally published in 1963, around the time of the Cuban Missile Crisis. Protect and Survive was published in 1980, shortly before Briggs began work on When the Wind Blows.

Many of James and Hilda's preparations came directly from the pamphlets:

- Page 10 of Protect and Survive provided James with the directions for making the lean-to using doors to protect from radiation.
- Page 14 of Advising the Householder demonstrated how whitewashing windows reduces fire damage by reflecting the heat from the nuclear blast.
- Page 16 of Protect & Survive illustrated a box of sand for dishwashing.

Briggs was not the only one to criticise the pamphlets about preparation for nuclear war. One of the best-known critiques was E. P. Thompson's anti-nuclear paper, Protest and Survive, playing off the Protect and Survive series.

Criticisms like Protest and Survive point out the inadequacies of the preparation procedures posed by the pamphlet Protect and Survive. In contrast, by the comic format or graphic novel genre, Briggs is able to depict a more realistic account of the effects of nuclear attack on civilians, like James and Hilda. In When the Wind Blows, James makes reference to the bombing of Hiroshima and uses his knowledge of that event to infer what could happen to him and Hilda and to make sense of his own experience before and after the nuclear attack. Unlike the nuclear preparation pamphlets, Briggs's depictions of James and Hilda's experience with radiation sickness actually align with real accounts.

== See also ==
- Other fiction about nuclear and radiological attacks on Britain
  - The Bedsitting Room, a 1962 satirical play about the short-term aftermath of a nuclear attack which received a film adaptation in 1969
  - The War Game, a 1966 film about a nuclear attack and its short-term aftermath
  - Riddley Walker, a 1980 novel taking place some two thousand years after a nuclear war and set in what used to be Kent
  - Z for Zachariah, a 1984 BBC Play for Today adaptation of the 1974 novel about a girl's survival in the aftermath of a nuclear war; the Play for Today adaptation takes place in Wales rather than the original novel's United States setting
  - Brother in the Land, a 1984 novel about a boy's struggle for survival in the aftermath of a nuclear attack
  - Threads, a 1984 film about a nuclear attack and its long-term aftermath
  - Dirty War, a 2004 film about a terrorist dirty bomb attack
- List of nuclear holocaust fiction
- Rock-a-bye Baby - Origin of the title.
