= Houda Echouafni =

Moroccan actress

Houda Echouafni is a British-Moroccan actress. Her theatre work includes The RSC, The National Theatre and The Globe Theatre.

Echouafni began filming Penny Woolcock's The Death of Klinghoffer in Malta while she was still at Drama school. Other roles include Doctors, Waking the Dead and Hotel Babylon, Green Wing

Echouafni has Worked with the Royal Court, translating and acting in plays for their international season. This has resulted in one of her translations being published in the book Plays from the Arab World by Nick Hern Books.

Echouafni played Shahrazad in Tim Supples' 6 hour production of One Thousand and One Nights to critical acclaim the play was adapted by Hanan al-shyakh.

Her TV work includes Mother Mary in the epic TV series Jesus: His Life for the History Channel.

== Early life ==
Echouafni was born in Casablanca, Morocco to a Moroccan mother and an Egyptian father. After the loss of her father when she was 3, Echouafni spent her early childhood with her maternal grandparents and attended a French school while her mother finished her studies. At age 11, Echouafni joined her mother in London. Echouafni was in secondary school when she became interested in drama and the writings of Arthur Miller, Tennessee Williams, and Shakespeare.
