= First Strike (1979 film) =

- Written by: Fleming B. Fuller
- Directed by: Fleming B. Fuller
- Country of origin: United States
- Original language: English

Production
- Producers: Fleming B. Fuller, United States Air Force
- Cinematography: William Wages
- Editor: John V. Fante
- Running time: 36 minutes
- Production company: Chronicle Broadcasting Company

Original release
- Network: NBC
- Release: 1979

First Strike is a 1979 TV documentary film created by KRON-TV and Chronicle Publishing Company under the broadcast division name "Chronicle Broadcasting Company" in partnership with the United States Department of Defense and the RAND Corporation. The film discusses the United States Armed Forces strategy for dealing with nuclear warfare, the development of the AGM-186 ALCM, B-1 bomber as well as the MX missile and the intensifying arms race in the 1970s and early 1980s. It became far better known when various clips were edited into the 1983 TV film The Day After.

== Plot ==
The film is divided into two main segments. The first section of the film is a dramatization of a sneak attack, or first strike by the Soviet Union against the United States. The premise of the attack is based on Soviet nuclear submarines approaching the United States West Coast and launching a barrage of missiles at ICBM silos and B-52 bomber bases, and other Soviet forces manage to destroy a number of U.S. ballistic missile submarines at sea. In the film, when Strategic Air Command is able to launch a retaliatory strike, over 80% of U.S. strategic forces have been destroyed, and the President of the United States is forced to surrender to the Soviets under threat of U.S. urban centers being destroyed. U.S. casualties are stated to be eight million dead; the "low" number is because of the Soviet attack hitting military bases, instead of cities. The second portion of the film is a series of interviews in which analysts discuss U.S. security and the ability of the Soviet military to attack with little to no warning. The interviewees mention and advocate the MX missile system, which was in the 1980s fielded as the LGM-118 Peacekeeper, most notable the various basing options. However, not all aspects of the MX system were implemented.

== Interviewees ==
The film includes interviews with the following participants:

- General Richard H. Ellis, CINCSAC
- William Van Cleave, political scientist
- James Schlesinger, Secretary of Defense 1973-75
- William J. Perry, Under Secretary of Defense for Research and Engineering
- William R. Graham, physicist
- Edward Luttwak, author
- Walter Slocombe, Deputy Assistant Secretary for International Security Affairs
- Dr. Robert K. Squire
- Dr. Francis P. Hoeber
- Major General Warren C. Moore
- Paul H. Nitze, Secretary of Defense 1967-69

== Plausibility ==
Since its original release, the scenario in the film has come to be seen as extremely unrealistic by some military theorists. The main flaw in the documentary has been stated that the Soviet Navy would not have been able to deploy its submarine fleet and approach the United States coast undetected since Soviet submarine technology of the 1970s could not have breached U.S. sonar detection. Furthermore, the President is depicted surrendering very quickly, but realistically, any attack on America would have unleashed a swift response by the entire armed forces of NATO in Europe under Article 5 of the North Atlantic Treaty. Also, British and French nuclear forces; those possessed by Belgium, Italy, Greece, Canada and West Germany as part of the NATO nuclear sharing; and the likelihood of China siding with NATO and attacking the Soviet Union's southern border are not considered. The scenario depicted was used to illustrate renewed fears of a new potential missile gap and window of vulnerability for American strategic forces in the late 1970s after the breakdown of Detente.

== Depiction in The Day After ==
Four years after the release of First Strike, the following scenes of the film were incorporated into the TV movie The Day After to depict a nuclear attack on the United States:

1. A general officer from the Strategic Air Command (SAC) boarding the airborne command post airplane and receiving a morning briefing.
2. An ICBM crew arriving at a Minuteman launch control center facility for a shift change.
3. B-52 bomber forces being placed on alert.
4. A scene in the SAC airborne command post airplane in which the general in command, along with an aide, opens the nuclear missile launch code safe.
5. The ICBM crew launching its LGM-30 Minuteman missiles.
6. The PAVE PAWS early warning radar installation at Beale Air Force Base detecting inbound Soviet missiles.
7. Battle staff aboard the SAC airborne command post airplane reporting that over 300 Soviet ICBMs are inbound to the United States.

== Air Force personnel ==
The film used actual United States Air Force personnel for actors and filmed on location at various Air Force installations and also shot footage inside NORAD Headquarters at the Cheyenne Mountain Complex. The film used footage captured onboard the Strategic Air Command (SAC) Airborne Command Post airplane based out of Offutt Air Force Base, with personnel of the 2nd Airborne Command and Control Squadron taking part. The Air Force general in command of the SAC airborne command post airplane was Brigadier General Clarence R. Autery, acting as Airborne Emergency Action Officer (AEAO). The nuclear missile launch sequence seen in the film and later in The Day After was performed by two officers of the 742d Strategic Missile Squadron, 91st Strategic Missile Wing at the Oscar-01 launch control facility, 29 miles away from Minot Air Force Base near Maxbass. The ICBM launch crew consisted of 1st Lieutenant Tim Krause, who would later command a Titan missile crew, Deputy Missile Combat Crew Commander, and Captain Mark E. Stanton, Missile Combat Crew Commander, who has both a Missile badge and pilot's wings, uncommon among many missileers; the crew was part of the wing's standardization and evaluation team. The alert launch of B-52 bombers was performed by Select crew S-32 of the 2nd Bombardment Squadron, 22nd Bombardment Wing at March Air Force Base, consisting of:

- Pilot: Capt Mike Wise;
- Co-pilot: Capt Kevin Schmidt;
- Radar navigator: Capt Harry Mandros;
- Navigator: 1st Lt Bill Pfeiffer;
- Electronic warfare officer: 1st Lt Kent Esbenshade; and
- Tail gunner: TSgt Michael Reed.

None of the Air Force personnel were credited in the film. An additional scene provided by the United States Navy depicts the ballistic missile submarine USS Francis Scott Key getting underway for a patrol at the Naval Weapons Station at Charleston.
