= The Bed Sitting Room (film) =

1969 British film by Richard Lester

- Theatrical poster
- Directed by: Richard Lester
- Written by: John Antrobus
- Screenplay by: Charles Wood (adaption)
- Based on: The Bedsitting Room; 1963 play by Spike Milligan & John Antrobus
- Produced by: Oscar Lewenstein; Richard Lester
- Starring: Rita Tushingham; Dudley Moore; Harry Secombe; Arthur Lowe; Roy Kinnear; Spike Milligan; Ronald Fraser; Jimmy Edwards; Michael Hordern; Peter Cook; Ralph Richardson; Marty Feldman
- Cinematography: David Watkin
- Edited by: John Victor Smith
- Music by: Ken Thorne
- Production company: Oscar Lewenstein Productions
- Distributed by: United Artists
- Release dates: June 1969 (Berlin); 25 March 1970 (UK)
- Running time: 91 minutes
- Country: United Kingdom
- Language: English

The Bed Sitting Room is a 1969 British black comedy film directed by Richard Lester and starring an ensemble cast of British comic actors. It was written by John Antrobus based on the 1962 play of the same name by Spike Milligan and himself. The film is an absurdist, post-apocalyptic, satirical black comedy.

== Plot ==
The film is set in London on the third or fourth anniversary of a nuclear war that killed 40 million, and lasted two minutes and 28 seconds, including the time taken to sign the peace treaty. It is not clear who dropped the bomb. Three (or possibly four) years after the nuclear holocaust, the survivors wander amidst the debris. Most characters avoid using the word "bomb" throughout.

Captain Bules Martin, who holds a "Defeat of England" medal as he was unable to save Buckingham Palace from disintegration during the war, is also referred to as Doctor by Lord Fortnum, who asks for a prescription for malnourishment, but fears he's turning into a bed sitting room. When Martin confirms it, Lord Fortnum gets a second opinion from the "National Health Service", a male nurse overwhelmed by the extent of the war's aftermath.

Penelope, who lives in a tube train on the (still functioning) Circle line with her parents, gets caught in bed with her fiancé Alan, who then joins their party. It is said that Penelope is pregnant. In search of a nurse, they leave the train taking a trunk so they won't look like vagrants, unknowingly carrying a living man who's been ready to be collected as dead for three years.

Two policemen hover overhead in the shell of a Morris Minor Panda car that has been made into a makeshift balloon and shout "keep moving" at any survivors they see to offset the danger of them becoming a target in the unlikely event of another outbreak of hostilities.

Martin finds Shelter Man, a regional seat of government who survived the war in a fallout shelter and spends his days looking at old films (without a projector) and reminiscing about the time he shot his wife and his mother as they pleaded with him to let them into his shelter. His current wife Doris (a picture of a shirtless woman attached to the wall) holds food and they share. Shelter Man reveals that he saw evidence that they dipped the bombs in germs to infect the population with measles to kill them off.

National Health Service stalks Penelope and her family and gives Mother her death certificate although she's still alive, and attempts to capture her with a net. Mother wanders away from her family, slips into Shelter Man's home, and transforms into a cupboard.

Lord Fortnum calls Martin, informing him that he is at 29 Cul de Sac Place, and actually does become a bed-sitting room. Mate, a fireguard with nothing left to burn, tricks Martin into leaving so he can move furniture inside. Character "Mao Tse-tung", or Chinaman, moves Mother into the room.

Father is measured by the police and Martin asks to court Penelope. Despite her love for Alan, Father agrees to Martin as it will help him when he becomes prime minister, a position he is believed to get based on "his inside leg measurements". Penelope is uninterested in the date. They hold the wedding ceremony at St Paul's Cathedral, which is mostly submerged underwater. Underwater Vicar weds them. Martin runs off to get his virility test, leaving Penelope, who soon goes into labour. Father is selected to become the prime minister.

National Health Service insists that Penelope's baby stay in her womb, but she delivers it. When she shows it to her father, he is found to be transformed into a parrot. Penelope learns that the cupboard is her mother.

Father kills himself and his body is cooked due to the starvation conditions that prevail. Mate warns everyone of the radiation and people head inside the bed-sitting room. Penelope and Alan find their baby dead. Rubber Man repents as the police knock down the bed-sitting room, Lord Fortnum speaks up and impersonates God, but is quickly shut down by Martin.

The police bring back the chest and reunite Martin with Nigel, the man inside. Penelope is pregnant with her next child, which is normal and healthy. The police inspector delivers a speech as an indication of hope for the future of the country amidst the devastation when it transpires that a team of surgeons have developed a cure for the mutations involving full-body transplant. Finally, a military band pays homage to Mrs. Ethel Shroake of 393A High Street, Leytonstone, the late Queen's former charwoman, and closest in succession to the throne.

== Cast ==
- Ralph Richardson as Lord Fortnum of Alamein
- Rita Tushingham as Penelope
- Michael Hordern as Bules Martin
- Arthur Lowe as Father
- Mona Washbourne as Mother
- Peter Cook as Police Inspector
- Dudley Moore as Police Sergeant
- Spike Milligan as Mate
- Harry Secombe as Shelter Man
- Marty Feldman as Nurse Arthur
- Jimmy Edwards as Nigel
- Roy Kinnear as Plastic Mac Man
- Ronald Fraser as The Army
- Richard Warwick as Alan
- Frank Thornton as The BBC
- Dandy Nichols as Mrs Ethel Shroake
- Jack Shepherd as Underwater Vicar
- Henry Woolf as Electricity Man
- Cecil Cheng as Chinaman
- Bill Wallis as The Prime Minister
- Ronnie Brody as The Chauffeur

== Production ==
After completing Petulia (1968) Richard Lester had intended his next film to be Up Against It, written by playwright Joe Orton, but Orton was murdered shortly before production. Lester offered The Bed Sitting Room to United Artists as a replacement.

Filming took place between May and July 1968, mainly in and around Chobham Common.

== Release ==
When the executives at United Artists saw the film, they hated it, and it was shelved for a year, getting its first release at the Berlin International Film Festival in 1969. It was not released in the UK until March 1970. It would be the last film released by United Artists' foreign film arm Lopert Pictures Corporation, which folded in 1970.

The film was entered into the 19th Berlin International Film Festival in July 1969, and Richard Lester received the C.I.D.A.L.C. Gandhi Award for it. On 26 March 1970, the film premiered in London at the CineCenta Cinema on Panton Street (today Odeon Panton Street), Europe's first multi-screen cinema.

== Critical reception ==
The Monthly Film Bulletin wrote: "There is scarcely a trace of a story-line; hence all the gags and lunatic gooneries are without dramatic connection, and situation comedy cannot survive without a plot to supply the situations. The gallery of characters can hardly be said to interact with one another; in many cases they exist solely in terms of a single outlandish idea or costume, with little else in the way of discernible personality. ... If the story is conceived in static terms, so are the individual shots, which in all too many cases are beautifully composed, beautifully photographed stills, lacking motion and continuity. The Bed Sitting Room is what the script for The Knack was, according to Lester, before revision, "a completely lunatic sketchbook of surrealism" – and a sketchbook, of course, consists of isolated units haphazardly lumped together. This failure is the sadder in that so many elements operate brilliantly towards constructing a devastating critique of 'civilised' society and its pathetic values."

Leslie Halliwell wrote "Arrogantly obscure fantasy, a commercial flop which kept the director in the wilderness for four years. Fans of Monty Python may salvage a joke or two."

John Russell Taylor in The Times found the film both funny and frightening, but lacking ideas enough for a whole feature film: "Precisely the same objection applies to the film as applied to the play: that it is based on one of those ideas which are fine in themselves but suffer from the drawback that once you have stated them, all you can do is state them again, louder".

Stanley Kauffmann wrote that the Bed Sitting Room was 'a disaster.

On the review aggregator website Rotten Tomatoes, 64% of 14 critics' reviews are positive, with an average rating of 5.9/10.

== Home media ==
The British Film Institute (BFI) has released The Bed Sitting Room on DVD and Blu-ray disc through its Flipside line.

== See also ==
- The Bedsitting Room (play)
- Other fiction about nuclear and radiological attacks on Britain
  - The War Game, a 1966 film about a nuclear attack and its short-term aftermath
  - Riddley Walker, a 1980 novel taking place some two thousand years after a nuclear war and set in what used to be Kent
  - When the Wind Blows, a 1982 graphic novel about a nuclear attack as experienced by a retired couple which received an animated adaptation in 1986
  - Brother in the Land, a 1984 novel about a boy's struggle for survival in the aftermath of a nuclear attack
  - Threads, a 1984 film about a nuclear attack and its long-term aftermath
  - Dirty War, a 2004 film about a terrorist dirty bomb attack
- List of apocalyptic and post-apocalyptic fiction
