= Jack Stokes (director) =

British animation director

- Born: John Albert Stokes; 2 April 1920; Leigh-on-Sea, Essex, England, UK
- Died: 20 March 2013 (aged 92); England, UK
- Occupations: Animator, Animation director
- Years active: 1963 – 2001
- Spouse: Jill
- Children: Jacqueline and Hilary

John Albert Stokes (2 April 1920 – 20 March 2013) was a British animation director best known for his work on the 1968 Beatles film Yellow Submarine.

== Life and career ==
Jack Stokes began his training at Southend College of Art. After serving in the RAF during the Second World War, Stokes was fortunate to be taken on as a trainee animator at David Hand's Gaumont British Animation studio which at the time had recently opened at Moor Hall in Cookham, Berkshire. He served as an animator for the Animaland division led by Bert Felstead. Such opportunities were almost unknown in Britain in the post-war years.

By the early 1960s he had established his own studio, Stokes Cartoons, producing work for cinema and television. It was during this time that he began working with the Canadian film-maker George Dunning, and with his friend John Coates who ran another London animation studio, TVC. In 1965 TVC produced an animated series for US television entitled simply The Beatles which, although it was very successful in the United States was never shown on British television. Following on from this, Stokes was commissioned to create animations for the title sequences of the Beatles' 1967 film, Magical Mystery Tour. Then in 1968, along with Bob Balser, he created his most well-known animations, from the work of illustrator Heinz Edelmann, for the film Yellow Submarine, directed by Dunning.

Throughout the 1970s, 1980s and 1990s he worked on a number of films and television series, including episodes of Roobarb and adaptations of Beatrix Potter's The Tailor of Gloucester and Charles Kingsley's The Water Babies. In 1975–76, Richard Williams chose him and Gerald Potterton to represent the London contingent of Raggedy Ann & Andy: A Musical Adventure.

He retired in his 80s, and died on 20 March 2013, aged 92.

== Filmography ==
Feature Films
Year	Title	Animation Director
1968	Wonderwall	Titles and Special Effects (credited to Stokes Cartoons)
1968	Yellow Submarine	Animation Director
1969	Moon Zero Two	Animator (title sequence – credited as Stokes Cartoons)
1971	Tiki Tiki	Animator
1975	Tarzoon: Shame of the Jungle	Additional Animator
1978	The Water Babies	Storyboard Artist
1981	Heavy Metal	Sequence Director, Animator (segment "Den")
1985	Asterix Versus Caesar	Layout Artist, Storyboard Artist
1987	The Big Bang	Layout Artist
1991	The Princess and the Goblin	Additional Animator
1992	The Magic Voyage	Character Animator, Storyboard Artist
1997	Prince Valiant	Animation Director, Animation Layout Artist, Animator
2001	Christmas Carol: The Movie	Animator

Short Films
Year	Title	Credit
1962	The Ever-changing Motor Car	Animator
1963	The Apple	Animator
1964	Paynes Poppets: Back Row	Director
1964	Paynes Poppets: In French	Director
1965	Kindred Spirit	Animator
1966	Rock 'n Roll Music	Director
1967	Insydoutsydin	Director, Writer
1967	Scotch All	Director
1972	Boom Bom Boom	Director
1974	The Little Mermaid	Effects Animator
1996	Famous Fred	Special Effects

Television
Year	Title	Credit
1965– 1969	The Beatles	Director, Designer
1974	Roobarb	Animator, Unit Director
1984– 1985	The Family-Ness	Director
1992– 1998	The World of Peter Rabbit and Friends	Director
1996– 1999	Percy the Park Keeper	Storyboard Artist
1997–	Kipper	Storyboard Artist

Television Movies
Year	Title	Credit
1983	David Macaulay: Castle	Animation Director, Layout Artist, Storyboard Artist
1989	Granpa	Key Animator
1991	Father Christmas	Key Animator
1995	The Wind in the Willows	Additional Storyboard Artist
1996	The Willows in Winter	Key Animator
1998	The Bear	Layout Artist
1999	Santa's Special Delivery	Director
