= Dianne Jackson =

English animation director (1941–1992)

- Born: 28 July 1941
- Died: 31 December 1992 (aged 51)

Dianne Jackson (28 July 1941 – 31 December 1992) was an English animation director, best known for The Snowman, made in 1982 and repeated every Christmas on Channel 4 in the United Kingdom.

She was born Dianne Hillier in 1941 and attended Twickenham County Grammar School and Twickenham Art School.

She had a long career as an animator and director of animated half-hour TV Specials. Her earliest credit was for The Beatles' Yellow Submarine in 1968. She is particularly noted for recreating the style of the original artists in her animations, for example of Raymond Briggs's picture book, The Snowman and John Burningham's Granpa.

She directed Granpa by John Burningham in 1989 and was due to direct Raymond Briggs' Father Christmas in 1991, having completed storyboarding for the film, although due to development work on the 'Beatrix Potter Series' this was directed by Dave Unwin. She also wrote the outlines and treatments for the first series of animated adaptations of the tales of Beatrix Potter as The World of Peter Rabbit and Friends. She died of cancer on New Year's Eve 1992 at the age of 51. The series episode "The Tailor of Gloucester", a Xmas special, which was in production during the last year of her life is "dedicated to her memory".

== Personal life ==
Hillier first married Michael Jackson in 1963 (divorced 1971), and secondly David Norton in 1975, with whom she had one son and one daughter. She died at home in Brockenhurst.
