= Ethel & Ernest (film) =

- Poster
- Directed by: Roger Mainwood
- Screenplay by: Roger Mainwood
- Based on: Ethel & Ernest by Raymond Briggs
- Produced by: Camilla Deakin; Ruth Fielding; Stephan Roelants
- Starring: Jim Broadbent; Brenda Blethyn; Luke Treadaway
- Edited by: Richard Overall
- Music by: Carl Davis
- Production companies: BBC; Lupus Films; Ethel & Ernest Productions; Melusine Productions; Cloth Cat Animation; BFI; Ffilm Cymru Wales; Film Fund Luxembourg
- Distributed by: Universal Pictures; Vertigo Releasing
- Release dates: 15 October 2016 (London Film Festival); 28 December 2016
- Running time: 94 minutes
- Countries: United Kingdom; Luxembourg
- Language: English

Ethel & Ernest is a 2016 British animated biographical film directed by Roger Mainwood. The film is based on the 1998 graphic memoir of the same name written by Raymond Briggs, and follows Briggs' parents, Ethel and Ernest, through their period of marriage from 1928 to their deaths in 1971. It was broadcast on television on BBC One on 28 December 2016.

== Plot ==
The film details the marriage of Ethel and Ernest Briggs from the 1920s to the 1970s, as they live through extraordinary events occurring in that period.

== Cast ==
- Jim Broadbent as Ernest Briggs
- Brenda Blethyn as Ethel Briggs
- Luke Treadaway as Raymond Briggs
  - Harry Collett as young Raymond Briggs
- Roger Allam as Doctor Trotter
- Pam Ferris as Mrs. Bennett and Aunt Betty
- Virginia McKenna as Lady Foxworthy
- Peter Wight as Detective Sergeant Burnley
- June Brown as Ernest's Stepmother
- Simon Day as Alf

== Production ==
The film was originally to be produced by John Coates, notable for producing The Snowman. When Coates died in 2012, Camilla Deakin and Ruth Fielding (Lupus Films) were then hired to help complete the film. The voice cast for the film was revealed on 3 August 2015. The film was made of 67,680 hand-drawn individual frames.

The film's soundtrack has a score by Carl Davis, but also uses songs of the period featured relevant to scenes of the film by Bert Lown, Al Bowlly, Ambrose and his Orchestra, Joe Daniels and his Hotshots, Florence Desmond, Jack Hylton, Gracie Fields, Charles Penrose, Juliette Greco, The Shadows and Dave Berry, and closes with an original song "In The Blink Of An Eye" written and performed by Paul McCartney.

== Release ==
The film made its official debut in the 60th BFI London Film Festival. The film made its theatrical premiere in the U.S. at the Nuart Landmark Theatre in Santa Monica, California, on 15 December 2017.

== Reception ==
=== Critical response ===
On review aggregation website Rotten Tomatoes, the film has an average rating of 97%, with an average score of 7.5/10, based on 35 reviews. The site's critical consensus reads, "Gentle, poignant, and vividly animated, Ethel & Ernest is a warm character study with an evocative sense of time and place." On Metacritic, which assigns a normalized rating, the film has a score of 72 out of 100, based on 10 critics, indicating "generally favorable reviews".
