= One Voice =

One Voice may refer to:

== Organizations ==
- One Voice Children's Choir, a children's choir based in Utah
- One Voice Mixed Chorus, a GLBTA mixed chorus in Minnesota
- OneVoice Movement, an international mainstream grassroots movement in Israel/Palestine empowering moderates for conflict resolution
- One Voice Technologies, a developer of intelligent personal assistant technology

== Music ==
=== Bands ===
- One Voice (group), an all-girl singing group, stylized as OneVo1ce

=== Albums ===
- One Voice (Barry Manilow album), 1979
- One Voice (Grace Kennedy album), 1981
- One Voice (Barbra Streisand album), 1987
- One Voice (Agnostic Front album), 1992
- One Voice (Billy Gilman album), 2000
- One Voice (Andrew Johnston album), 2008
- One Voice (Micah Stampley album), 2011
- One Voice (Aled Jones album), 2016
  - One Voice at Christmas, Aled Jones follow-up later the same year
- One Voice (Kyuhyun album), 2017

=== Songs ===
- "One Voice" (Billy Gilman song), the lead single from Billy Gilman's album One Voice
- "One Voice", the lead single from John Watts's album One More Twist (1982)
- "One Voice", a song by Brandy from her album Never Say Never
- "One Voice", a song by the Gear Daddies from their album Billy's Live Bait
- "One Voice", a song by Pennywise from their album Straight Ahead
- "One Voice", a song by Patti Smith from her album Gung Ho
- "One Voice", a song from Barry Manilow's One Voice
- "One Voice", a song by The Wailin' Jennys on their album 40 Days
