= One Voice at Christmas =

Studio album by Aled Jones
- Released: 25 November 2016
- Recorded: 1986, 2016
- Genre: Classical, folk, Christmas
- Label: Classic FM

Aled Jones chronology
One Voice (2016)	One Voice at Christmas (2016)

One Voice at Christmas is a 2016 Christmas album by the Welsh singer Aled Jones and produced by Classic FM. It was created as a follow-up to Jones' One Voice album released earlier in the year and followed a similar style with Jones duetting on Christmas carols and songs with his younger self. It reached a peak of 22 in the official UK Album Charts and number 1 in the UK Classical Chart.

== Background ==
In April 2016, Jones released One Voice involving duets with himself recorded when he was a boy soprano. The album was a critical success and reached a peak of 3 in the UK Albums Chart. Jones planned a follow-up album which he planned to release in time for Christmas. The album One Voice at Christmas was revealed on a Flybe flight from London City Airport to Cardiff Airport by Jones singing "Walking in the Air" (which had made his fame due to associations with "The Snowman") on the plane.

== Album ==
The album consists of Jones performing duets of Christmas carols and other Christmas songs with his younger self. However, he also duets with other people compared with the original One Voice. Jones duets with John Williams on "Silent Night", and Libera on "O Holy Night", "Jesus Christ the Apple Tree" and "Away in a Manger". "Little Drummer Boy", his 2008 duet with Sir Terry Wogan is included as a bonus track. The album was recorded in California, United States, due to the producer living in New Zealand. Jones stated that it felt odd recording "In the Bleak Midwinter" in August in a hot climate.

When it was released on 25 November 2016 it went straight to number 1 in the UK Classical Chart and remained there for the rest of December, becoming the UK Classical Chart Christmas number 1. In the UK Album Charts, it fared less well by entering at 30 and retaining that spot for the next week before rising to 24 and 22 the following weeks over Christmas but then dropped out after five weeks in the chart.

== Track listing ==
One Voice at Christmas contains the following tracks:

1. "Walking in the Air"
2. "O Holy Night"
3. "In the Bleak Midwinter"
4. "Silent Night"
5. "O Come, O Come Emmanuel"
6. "Have Yourself a Merry Little Christmas"
7. "Jesus Christ the Apple Tree"
8. "Away in a Manger"
9. "The Little Road to Bethlehem"
10. "It Came Upon the Midnight Clear"
11. "Hwiangerdd Mair (Mary's Lullaby)"
12. "Come unto Him"
13. "Little Drummer Boy"

== Certifications ==
Region	Certification	Certified units/sales
United Kingdom (BPI)	Silver	60,000^{‡}
^{‡} Sales+streaming figures based on certification alone.
