= John Coates (producer) =

British film producer (1927–2012)

John Coates (7 November 1927 – 16 September 2012) was a British film producer, best known for producing the animated film The Snowman based on the picture book by Raymond Briggs, one of the first animated productions screened on Channel 4 and still repeated every year on the channel.

He co-founded the animation studio TVC (Television Cartoons) London with George Dunning in 1957 and worked on The Beatles's animated feature Yellow Submarine and produced numerous other animated films including When the Wind Blows, Granpa, Father Christmas, The World of Peter Rabbit and Friends and The Bear. John's business partner for many years was Norman David Kauffman, who first worked with him at the age of 16 as a trainee animator. He became a Director of TVC and associated companies in 1999 until his retirement in 2012. John was the nephew of the 1st Baron Rank, and worked within the Rank Organisation after leaving school at Stowe. He had three siblings, including Anne V. Coates, Academy Award-winning editor of Lawrence of Arabia.

Coates died of cancer at the age of 84 in his home in Kent, England, on 16 September 2012. The Snowman and the Snowdog is dedicated to his memory.
