= Henkäys ikuisuudesta =

Henkäys Ikuisuudesta

Studio album by Tarja
- Released: 8 November 2006
- Genre: Christmas; classical
- Length: 55:14 / 58:13
- Label: Universal; Nems Enterprises
- Producer: Esa Nieminen

Tarja chronology
Henkäys Ikuisuudesta (2006)	My Winter Storm (2007)

Singles from Henkäys Ikuisuudesta
- 1. "You Would Have Loved This" Released: 25 October 2006

Henkäys Ikuisuudesta (officially translated as: Breath From Heaven) is the first solo album by the Finnish singer Tarja Turunen, and focuses on the Christmas holiday season. On November 26, 2010, Nuclear Blast released a re-mastered version of the CD, bringing a new artwork and a semi-new track list, with "Heinillä Härkien" replacing "Happy New Year" and "Maa On Niin Kaunis" replacing "Happy Christmas (War Is Over)"; the new edition also contains the previously unpublished track "Arkihuolesi Kaikki Heitä", which replaced "The Eyes of a Child".

== Background ==
All of the tracks are covers, except for "Kuin Henkäys Ikuisuutta" which was written by Tarja and Esa Nieminen. "En Etsi Valtaa, Loistoa" was released on Tarja's "Yhden Enkelin Unelma" single in 2004, but the vocals have been re-recorded for this album. The music is composed by Jean Sibelius and the lyrics by Zacharias Topelius; Tarja also released "Walking in the Air" when she was a member of Nightwish, on their 1998 album Oceanborn. "Marian Poika" is the Finnish version of "Mary's Boy Child" and "Jouluyö, Juhlayö" is "Silent Night". The ABBA cover "Happy New Year" consists of both English and Spanish lyrics. The first single of the album, "You Would Have Loved This", was released in Finland on October 25.

== Sales performance ==
The album reached Gold and Platinum status in Finland with more than 50,000 sold copies, and charted as N° 2 on the official Finnish Albums Chart.

== Track listing ==
Original Edition
No.	Title	Writer(s)	Length
1.	"Kuin Henkäys Ikuisuutta"	Turunen, Esa Niemien & Sinikka Svärd	4:29
2.	"You Would Have Loved This"	Cori Connors	3:59
3.	"Happy New Year"	Benny Andersson & Björn Ulvaeus	4:04
4.	"En Etsi Valtaa, Loistoa"	Jean Sibelius & Zacharias Topelius	3:27
5.	"Happy Christmas (War Is Over)"	John Lennon	4:30
6.	"Varpunen Jouluaamuna"	Otto Kotilainen & Zacharias Topelius	3:25
7.	"Ave Maria"	Franz Schubert & Sir Walter Scott	6:10
8.	"The Eyes of a Child"	Graham Russell, Brendan Graham, Rolf Løvland & Ron Bloom	4:22
9.	"Mökit Nukkuu Lumiset"	Heino Kaski & Eino Leino	4:16
10.	"Jo Joutuu Ilta"	Jean Sibelius & Zacharias Topelius	3:06
11.	"Marian Poika"	Jester Hairston	3:27
12.	"Magnificat: Quia Respexit"	J. S. Bach	3:35
13.	"Walking in the Air"	Howard Blake	4:37
14.	"Jouluyö, Juhlayö"	Franz Xaver Gruber & Joseph Mohr	3:47

Jouluinen Platinapainos (Christmas Platinum Edition)
No.	Title	Length
1.	"Kuin Henkäys Ikuisuutta"	4:32
2.	"You Would Have Loved This"	4:02
3.	"Heinillä Härkien"	4:41
4.	"En Etsi Valtaa, Loistoa"	3:31
5.	"Varpunen Jouluaamuna"	3:28
6.	"Ave Maria"	6:14
7.	"Maa On Niin Kaunis"	3:47
8.	"Mökit Nukkuu Lumiset"	4:18
9.	"Jo Joutuu Ilta"	3:08
10.	"Magnificat: Quia Respexit"	3:38
11.	"Kun Joulu On"	3:34
12.	"Arkihuolesi Kaikki Heitä"	3:31
13.	"Walking in the Air"	4:49
14.	"Jouluyö, Juhlayö"	3:49

== Sales and certifications ==
Country	Certification (sales thresholds)
Finland	2× Platinum

== Personnel ==
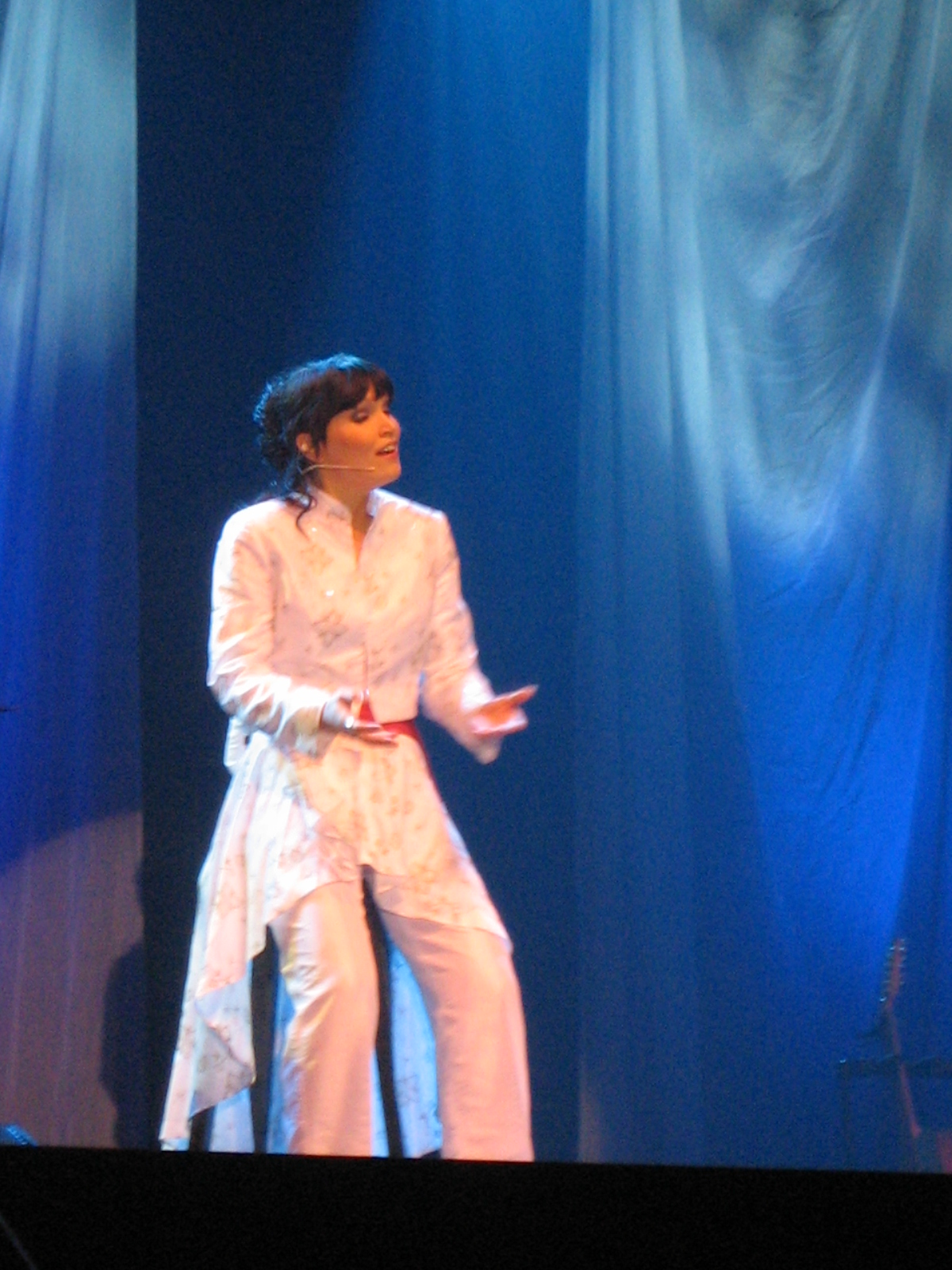
Tarja at the Sibelius Hall on December 12, 2006.

Credits for Henkäys Ikuisuudesta adapted from liner notes.

=== Musicians ===
- Tarja Turunen - Lead vocals
- Maria Ilmoniemi & Esa Nieminen - Keyboards and piano
- Juha Lanu - Electric and acoustic guitar
- Ako Kiiski - Bass guitar
- Harri Ala-Kojola - Drums
- Iiris Pyrhönen, Heikki Hämäläinen - Violin
- Tiia Makkonen & Veli-Matti Iljin - Cello
- Mauri Pietikäinen - Viola
- Emilia Kauppinen - Flute
- Heikki Pohto - Saxophone

=== Main crew ===
- Esa Nieminen - Music arrangements
- Mika Jussila - Mastering engineer
- Travis Smith - Cover artwork
- Toni Härkönen - Photography
