= The Snowman and the Snowdog =

2012 British animated television film

- Genre: Christmas
- Based on: Characters by Raymond Briggs
- Written by: Hilary Audus; Joanna Harrison
- Directed by: Hilary Audus
- Theme music composer: Ilan Eshkeri; Andy Burrows
- Country of origin: United Kingdom

Production
- Producers: John Coates; Camilla Deakin; Ruth Fielding
- Editor: Richard Overall
- Running time: 24 minutes
- Production company: Lupus Films

Original release
- Network: Channel 4
- Release: 24 December 2012

The Snowman and the Snowdog is a 2012 British animated short film. It is the sequel to The Snowman, and was created to mark the 30th anniversary of the original short film. The Snowman and the Snowdog is dedicated to John Coates (the film's producer, who died in September 2012) and features a new song called "Light the Night" by Razorlight drummer Andy Burrows. The Snowman and the Snowdog won the Televisual Bulldog Award 2013 in the Best Children's category. It was also nominated for the British Academy Children's Award for Animation in 2013.

== Plot ==
Some years after the events of The Snowman, a young boy named Billy, his mother and their dog move into a new house (which previously housed the first film's protagonist James and his parents). Near Christmas, Billy writes to Father Christmas in the form of a hand-drawn picture; the only thing he asks for is another dog to replace his recently deceased one. He then stumbles over a loose floorboard in his bedroom, where he discovers some toys and a small box tied with tinsel beneath it. In the box, he finds a photograph of James and the Snowman, as well as the original scarf, hat, coal lumps and an old dried-up tangerine (once the Snowman's nose). When it begins to snow, this inspires him to build the same snowman and also a snowdog.

That night, both the snowman and the snowdog come to life, much to Billy's surprise. They play in and around Billy's house for a while, only for the snowdog to begin melting a few seconds later. They rush outside, find a sled, and go to the top of the hill where they find snowmen flying. This inspires them to fly alongside other snowmen. However, the snowman loses his nose, which leads to Billy, the snowman, and the snowdog restarting their flight via a plane after the snowman finds his nose. They head out on a flight over London to visit the annual snowman party in the frozen north. At the party, they enter a downhill race against numerous snowmen competitors and a skiing penguin, which Billy and the snowdog win via a sled. Father Christmas gives Billy a small present: a magical dog collar. Billy, the snowman, and the snowdog then fly back to Billy's house while the pilot snowman follows them via his plane. Back home, Billy puts the dog collar on the snowdog, which turns the snowdog into a real live dog that matches the one that Billy asked for.

The next morning, Billy and his new dog "Socks" wake up and head outside so they can go and play with the snowman, but they end up finding that he has melted. They both kneel down by the snowman's remains, mourning the loss of their friend.

== Production ==
The 24-minute film, which took nearly two years to complete, cost £2 million to produce and, like the original movie, was created from over 200,000 hand-drawn images. While the film was primarily hand drawn, CGI was used to add digital falling snow and lighting effects. The film was tentatively called The Snowman 2 before the final name was revealed.

The composer Howard Blake, who composed the soundtrack to the original 1982 film, was one of the few crew members not asked to return, and after expressing an interest in returning was asked to "send a demo", which he refused, citing the success of the original orchestral production score. The film instead features the songs "Light the Night" (flying to the North Pole scenes) and "Hometown (Flying Home)" (returning home scenes) by Razorlight drummer Andy Burrows, plus incidental music by Ilan Eshkeri.

Reluctant to have the original The Snowman produced into a short film, Raymond Briggs was quoted as saying that "it took a lot of persuasion to allow the sequel to be made." Although Briggs was not himself responsible for the story of the new animation, the sequel could not have taken place without his permission as he owns the rights to the original characters and premise.

On 29 March 2012, Aardman Animations' distribution arm acquired the worldwide distribution rights to the short film, alongside North American and Japanese home media rights.

== Promotion ==
The Snowman and the Snowdog was heavily promoted in the weeks leading to its original broadcast, mostly by Channel 4, but also by other companies such as Nationwide.

== Reception ==
When the film was broadcast on Channel 4, on 24 December 2012, writing in The Guardian, Sam Wollaston praised the animation, but criticised the numerous similarities to the original plot.

== Video game ==
A smartphone game was released by Channel 4 on 9 December 2012 for iOS and Android. The game was developed by Crash Lab. It reached number 1 in the iPhone and iPad game charts and was downloaded over 1 million times in the UK and Ireland.

== Popular culture ==
In November 2016, a Christmas advert for British clothing company Barbour featured an older Billy and his dog reuniting with the Snowman and reminiscing about meeting Father Christmas.

In November 2017, Barbour released another Christmas advert, following on from the previous one in 2016.

A series of public art trails have been created, featuring outsize versions of the Snowdog, along with smaller Snowpups. To date, they have appeared in Newcastle and Tyne and Wear, Brighton and Hove, Cardiff and Ashford. After each exhibition the Snowdogs are sold at auction, with the proceeds going to local hospices.

== See also ==
- The Snowman – the original story.
- Father Christmas
