= You Raise Me Up: The Best of Aled Jones =

You Raise Me Up

Greatest hits album by Aled Jones
- Released: 2006
- Genre: Pop
- Label: Universal Classics and Jazz

You Raise Me Up: The Best of Aled Jones is a greatest hits album by Welsh singer Aled Jones, released on 27 November 2006.

In addition to many of Jones' best-known songs, the album includes a new version of his song "Walking in the Air". Like other Jones recordings, "O Holy Night" and "Dear Lord and Father of Mankind", the new version is a duet between present-day Jones and his younger self.

== Track list ==
1. "You Raise Me Up"
2. "I Believe"
3. "Panis angelicus"
4. "Walking In The Air"
5. "Deep Peace"
6. "How Great Thou Art"
7. "Marble Halls"
8. "Silent Night"
9. "Vespera"
10. "All Through The Night"
11. "Pie Jesu"
12. "My Life Flows On"
13. "Places (To the Out of Africa theme)"
14. "Abide With Me"
15. "San Damiano"
16. "Did You Not Hear My Lady"
17. "Suo-Gan"
18. "O Holy Night"
