= The Man (comics) =

Novel by Raymond Briggs

First edition

The Man is a graphic novella for children, written and illustrated by Raymond Briggs and published by Julia MacRae Books in 1992. It tells the humorous story of a boy, John, who is visited by the titular Man, a minuscule human (homunculus) who arrives in the boy's bedroom unclothed and hungry. After getting over his initial shock, the boy starts to take care of him. The story follows their relationship over the next few days between John and 'Man', with the Man showing himself to be demanding, bossy and messy, but nevertheless a bond forms between the pair. Their time together involves many funny and peculiar moments, such as an odd obsession with Frank Cooper's Oxford marmalade, using socks for jumpers, and a near-death collision with a marmalade jar.

Unlike the boy and Snowman in Briggs' famous wordless picture book The Snowman, both characters have full dialogue throughout, with each character's lines formatted differently so that they can be distinguished. Occasionally the dialogue and drawings are interspersed so that speech bubbles surround certain lines of text.

Dutch and Danish-language editions were published in 1993 and the first U.S. edition in 1995. Later there was an audiobook edition, with Michael Palin voicing the Man and William Puttock voicing John.

For both writing and illustrating The Man Briggs won the 1992 Kurt Maschler Award, or "the Emil". The award annually (1982 to 1999) recognised one British "work of imagination for children, in which text and illustration are integrated so that each enhances and balances the other."

== See also ==
- Fairy tale
