= Ug (book) =

Book by Raymond Briggs

- First edition cover
- Author: Raymond Briggs
- Illustrator: Raymond Briggs
- Language: English
- Genre: Children's
- Publisher: Jonathan Cape
- Publication date: 6 September 2001
- Publication place: United Kingdom
- Pages: 32
- ISBN: 978-0-224-04739-5
- OCLC: 47063296

Ug is a children's book by Raymond Briggs. In 2001 it won the Nestlé Smarties Book Prize Silver Award.

== Plot ==
The book is about a boy named Ug living in the Stone Age who is thought by others to "think too much". He wants to have soft trousers (the trousers he and all the other cavemen wear are made of sandstone) and believes mammoth skin would be good to use, in the end, he and his father Dug do make the trousers, but after realising they cannot sew them together, they call it a day and leave them. Ug then grows up to be a cave painter as his mother Dugs warned him.
