= Ivor the Invisible =

- Written by: Raymond Briggs
- Directed by: Hilary Audus
- Starring: Albey Brookes; Jane Horrocks; Timothy Spall; Alison Steadman
- Music by: Nitin Sawhney
- Country of origin: United Kingdom
- Original language: English

Production
- Running time: 22 minutes
- Production companies: Screen First; TVC London

Original release
- Network: Channel 4
- Release: 24 December 2001

Ivor the Invisible is an animated film made for British television's Channel 4 in 2001. It was written by the popular British author/illustrator, Raymond Briggs. Unlike Briggs' other films, which were adapted from his books, Ivor the Invisible was his first project to be conceived directly for the screen.

== Plot ==
One morning, a schoolboy named John awakes to find an invisible giant sitting at the foot of his bed. John names him Ivor and soon the giant is playing tricks around the house: squirting John's father with a garden hose, disturbing the laundry hanging on the clothesline, and stealing food. Ivor can create music, and later at the playground he gives John an invisible seesaw ride in the park, before playing about with ducks.

However, what Ivor really wants is to learn to write. He wants John to read him stories, and he wants to go to school with him. Ivor creates a great deal of mischief at John's school, writing rude words on the chalkboard. On the way home, Ivor incites the wrath of an angry mob after tampering with the Belisha beacons and pelican crossings. John knows Ivor cannot stay with them anymore and he bids him a sad goodbye as Ivor flies off into the sky.
