= The Snowman (picture book) =

1978 children's picture book by Raymond Briggs

- First edition
- Author: Raymond Briggs
- Illustrator: Raymond Briggs
- Language: English
- Genre: Picture book
- Publisher: Hamish Hamilton
- Publication date: 1978
- Publication place: United Kingdom
- Media type: Print
- Pages: 32 pp
- ISBN: 0241100046
- OCLC: 788883530
- LC Class: PZ7.B7646 Sn 1978

The Snowman is a wordless children's picture book by English author Raymond Briggs, first published in 1978 by Hamish Hamilton in the United Kingdom, and published by Random House in the United States in November of the same year. The book won a number of awards and was adapted into an animated television film in 1982 which is an annual fixture at Christmas.

The book is entirely wordless, and illustrated with only coloured pencils. Briggs said that it was partly inspired by his previous book Fungus the Bogeyman: "For two years I worked on Fungus, buried amongst muck, slime and words, so... I wanted to do something which was clean, pleasant, fresh and wordless and quick."

== Plot ==
One snowy winter's day, a boy builds a snowman who comes to life at the stroke of midnight. He and the boy play with appliances, toys and other bric-a-brac in the house, all while keeping quiet enough not to wake his parents. After they play with the lights on the family car, he prepares a feast that the duo eat by candlelight. The snowman takes the boy outside and they begin to fly over the South Downs and watch the sun coming up from Brighton pier before returning home. In the morning, the boy wakes up and rushes outside to find that the snowman has melted.

== Themes ==
In a 2012 interview for the Radio Times, Briggs noted "I create what seems natural and inevitable. The snowman melts, my parents died, animals die, flowers die. Everything does. There's nothing particularly gloomy about it. It's a fact of life." He disputed the idea that the book is a Christmas book, noting that it was only the animated adaptation that introduces this element.

== Awards ==
In the United Kingdom, it was the runner-up for the Kate Greenaway Medal from the Library Association, recognising the year's best children's book illustration by a British writer. (Note: Today there are usually eight books on the Greenaway shortlist. According to CCSU, some runners up for the Greenaway Medal through 2002 were Commended (from 1959) or Highly Commended (from 1974). There were thirty one "Highly Commended" runners up in twenty nine years from 1974 to 2002, including Briggs alone in 1978.) In the United States, it was named to the Lewis Carroll Shelf Award list in 1979.

== Adaptations ==
The book was adapted into a half-hour animated television film in 1982, which debuted on Channel 4 in the United Kingdom on 26 December. The Snowman film was nominated for an Academy Award for Best Animated Short Film and has become an annual festive event, inspiring multiple spin-offs including a concert work, stage show, video game, and an animated sequel.

The Royal Mint has issued The Snowman coins for Christmas, with a 50p coin for 2023, the first Christmas coin with King Charles III portrayed on the obverse.
