= Walking in the Air =

1982 song by Howard Blake

Single by Howard Blake & Peter Auty
- B-side: "Dance of the Snowmen"
- Released: 1982
- Genre: Christmas music; orchestral pop; choral music
- Length: 3:30
- Label: CBS
- Songwriter: Howard Blake
- Producer: Howard Blake

"Walking in the Air" is a song written by the English composer Howard Blake circa 1970, adapted for the 1982 animated film The Snowman based on Raymond Briggs's 1978 children's book of the same name. The song forms the centrepiece of The Snowman, which has become a seasonal favourite on British and Finnish television. The story relates the fleeting adventures of a young boy and a snowman who has come to life. In the second part of the story, the boy and the snowman fly to the North Pole. "Walking in the Air" is the theme for the journey. They attend a party of snowmen, at which the boy seems to be the only human until they meet Santa Claus with his reindeer, and the boy is given a scarf with a snowman pattern. In the film, the song was performed by St Paul's Cathedral choirboy Peter Auty; this performance was reissued in 1985 (on Stiff Records) and 1987.

== Controversy ==
In 1985, a cover version was recorded for use in a TV advertising campaign for Toys "R" Us. It was believed that Auty's voice had then broken, so Howard Blake recommended then-14-year-old Welsh chorister Aled Jones. Jones's recording reached number five in the UK singles chart on 28 December 1985, and he became a popular celebrity on the strength of his performance. The association of the song with Jones, combined with Auty not being credited on The Snowman, led to a common misconception that Jones performed the song in the film. "Walking in the Air" has subsequently been performed by more than forty artists, in a variety of styles. In a UK poll in 2012, the Aled Jones cover version was voted 13th on the ITV television special The Nation's Favourite Christmas Song.

== Cover versions ==
- Rainbow recorded an instrumental cover under the title "Snowman" for their 1983 album Bent Out of Shape.
- An ambient cover, performed by Tangerine Dream, was featured in the end sequence of the 1983 film The Keep.
- Aled Jones (as a teen boy soprano) reached number 5 in the UK Singles Chart in 1985 with his cover. He released it again, in a duet with himself (as an adult baritone), on his 2007 album You Raise Me Up: The Best of Aled Jones. In 2022, Jones recorded a duet version with tenor Russell Watson, which was included on the Christmas with Aled and Russell album of the same year.
- Irish girl treble Chloë Agnew (from Celtic Woman) covered the song on her debut solo album titled Walking in the Air in 2004, which hit number 13 on Billboard's Classical Albums Chart, and peaked at number 4 on Billboard's World Music chart.
- The Finnish symphonic metal band Nightwish covered the song in 1998 on a single and on their Oceanborn album. The single was certified gold in Finland in August 1999. After she left the band, former Nightwish vocalist Tarja Turunen covered the song again on her solo Christmas album, Henkäys ikuisuudesta ("Breath from Heaven"), which was also certified gold in Finland for sales in excess of 15,000 copies.
- McFly released their cover of the song on 2 December 2021. The single enjoyed a brief run on the UK Downloads chart, topping at number 25.
- Teitur Lassen, Dreamers' Circus, and Mads Kjøller Henningsen released a cover (in English) on their 2024 album Yule.
