= Father Christmas (book) =

1973 children's picture book by Raymond Briggs

- First edition
- Author: Raymond Briggs
- Illustrator: Raymond Briggs
- Language: English
- Genre: Children's graphic novel
- Publisher: Hamish Hamilton
- Publication date: 1973
- Publication place: United Kingdom
- Media type: Print (hardcover)
- Pages: 32pp
- ISBN: 978-0-241-02260-3
- OCLC: 788505364
- LC Class: LCC PZ7.B7646 Fat3
- Followed by: Father Christmas Goes on Holiday

Father Christmas is a British children's picture book written and drawn by Raymond Briggs and published by Hamish Hamilton in 1973. Briggs won the annual Kate Greenaway Medal from the Library Association, recognising the year's best children's book illustration by a British subject. For the 50th anniversary of the Medal (1955–2005), a panel named it one of the top ten winning works, which composed the ballot for a public election of the nation's favourite.

== Overview ==
Father Christmas presents a dramatically different modern interpretation of the character. He may physically resemble a stereotypical vision of a jolly Father Christmas, with his large white beard and red suit, but he couldn’t be more different. This Father Christmas is a down-to-earth working man living in a normal house, with the usual tasks of his delivery on Christmas Eve, who hides his warm heart behind a grumpy, dissatisfied exterior. There is no sign of either Mrs. Claus (apart from a hanging wall picture in one scene) or the elves in this apparently solo operation. Living with him are his cat and dog, and two reindeer. While he bumbles and mumbles about his work and life, it is clear he has a deep affection for his animals (he gives his cat and dog presents) and enjoys his work. He comes across as complaining about everything but ultimately loving what he does.

The book depicts Father Christmas' deliveries as he deals with a range of unusual residences while taking welcome breaks with food and drinks put out for him. Along the way, Father Christmas talks to only one person, a milkman intended to represent the author's father, Ernest Briggs. Despite his difficulties, Father Christmas completes his itinerary with his last stop being apparently Buckingham Palace.

Upon returning home, Father Christmas opens his own presents, of which he grumpily disapproves (apart from a bottle of alcohol from "Fred"). With his work done, however, he grows much more jolly and festive, singing carols in the shower and tucking into his large Christmas dinner with delight ("Lovely grub!"). Exhausted after his travels, he retires to bed, though not before giving his cat and dog their own presents and wishing the reader "Happy Blooming Christmas!".

Coward, McCann & Geoghan published the US edition of Father Christmas in October (ISBN 978-0-698-20272-6). Kirkus Reviews gave the book a starred review, signifying remarkable merit. In part, "Briggs projects Santa's day in comic strip sequence and balloon monologue, from his waking from a dream of sun ... You don't have to be British to take to this very human Father Christmas – but it helps to have an open eye for all the throwaway background detail."

In a BBC documentary of 31 December 2018, Raymond Briggs said that Father Christmas was partly based on his father as they were both delivery men. He also said that he received a letter of complaint from an American because of one scene in which Father Christmas is sitting on the toilet.

== Sequel and adaptation ==
Briggs completed a sequel, Father Christmas Goes on Holiday, published in 1975 by Hamish Hamilton in Britain and Coward, McCann & Geoghan in America.

The two books were adapted in 1991 as a 25-minute animated film, Father Christmas. Dave Unwin was the director and Mel Smith was the voice of Father Christmas.
