= Roger Mainwood =

British animator and film director (1953–2018)

- Born: 31 July 1953; Canterbury, Kent
- Died: 20 September 2018 (aged 65)
- Occupation(s): Animator, animated film director

Roger Mainwood (born 31 July 1953 - 20 September 2018) was a British animator and film director. He is best known for his work on Heavy Metal (1981), The World of Peter Rabbit and Friends (1994), Stressed Eric (2000), Meg and Mog (2003) and Ethel & Ernest (2016). Ethel & Ernest was nominated for 'Best Animated Feature Film' in the 2017 30th European Film Awards.

== Biography ==
Mainwood's father, Richard, worked for the Inner London Education Authority.

Mainwood assisted the Queen Elizabeth's school in Faversham, where he received an education in the arts. He later joined the London College of Printing and the Royal College of Art. His short animated film Cage was shown at the 1977 London film festival. In 1979, he animated a film version of the song "Autobahn" by the German band Kraftwerk. Mainwood later worked for TV Cartoons Ltd (TVC), and Halas and Batchelor studios.

In 1994, Mainwood released his first TV feature as a director, The World of Peter Rabbit and Friends. Twenty-two years later he directed his first animation film, Ethel & Ernest, based on the graphic novel by illustrator Raymond Briggs.

Roger Mainwood died of cancer in September 2018. He was married to Valerie (née) Jones, with whom he had two daughters, Naomi and Miriam.

== See also ==
- Lists of animated films
