= Granpa =

1989 film by Dianne Jackson

- Screen shot of the title card
- Directed by: Dianne Jackson
- Written by: John Burningham (book)
- Produced by: John Coates
- Starring: Peter Ustinov (as Granpa); Emily Osborne (as Emily)
- Music by: Howard Blake; Sarah Brightman; Wroughton Middle School Choir
- Distributed by: Channel 4 (broadcast); Universal Studios (VHS)
- Release date: 31 December 1989
- Running time: 26 minutes
- Country: United Kingdom
- Language: English

Granpa is a British family-oriented animated film which adapts a picture book by John Burningham. Produced by TVS for Channel 4 Television in 1989, it was released on VHS by PolyGram Video in 1994. After it was initially released by Stephen Woolley's Palace Video label earlier in the 90's.

An expensive film to produce, Granpa is hand-illustrated with coloured pencil, imitating Burningham's style in the book. It was directed by Dianne Jackson, who previously adapted The Snowman by Raymond Briggs (1978), a wordless picture book as an exceptionally successful family-oriented animated film (1982). Howard Blake, who wrote the music for The Snowman, wrote the music and the script for Granpa, which is referred to as an "animated children's opera". The voices of Granpa and Emily are by Peter Ustinov and Emily Osborne. Granpa won the Prix Jeunesse Special Prize in children's television programming in 1990.

== Book ==
The animated film is an adaptation of the children's picture book Granpa, written and illustrated by John Burningham and published by Jonathan Cape in 1984. Burningham won the Kurt Maschler Award, or "the Emil", from Kurt Maschler (the publisher) and BookTrust, which annually recognised the author(s) of one "work of imagination for children, in which text and illustration are integrated so that each enhances and balances the other."

== Plot ==
The film celebrates the relationship between a small girl named Emily (voiced by Emily Osborne), and her kindly but ailing grandfather (voiced by Peter Ustinov), along with a dog. Emily's playful innocence is contrasted with Granpa's increasing frailty. Aware that he will not be around for much longer, he shares his memories of adventures and days gone by.

These memories are vividly brought to life by her grandfather's tales, beginning with a description of Granpa's childhood and youth in the early part of the 20th Century. Other adventures include a Noah's Ark-influenced story where Granpa's house is submerged and the pair have to accommodate animals, an imaginary toy choir and piano show, an imaginary waltz, a trip to the seaside which culminates in an imaginary horse ride and a re-enactment of the Battle of Britain, a fishing trip which ends with a journey down the Thames pulled by a blue whale, a chivalrous tale of Saint George and the Dragon imagined on a bedcover, and games in snow. The final jungle section, in which monkeys steal Granpa's storybook, is intentionally left incomplete.

As the seasons pass, Granpa grows frailer and eventually Emily is left alone with an empty chair and the old man's loyal dog. She leaves the house with the dog and climbs a hill. As they travel, a group of children from her grandfather's childhood join them, along with the spirit of Granpa in his childhood youth.

== Production ==
Following the success of the animated Christmas film The Snowman, Channel 4 commissioned another animation from TVC studios in 1984; producer John Coates approached Dianne Jackson and composer Howard Blake, suggesting Burningham's picture book Granpa. Blake was initially reluctant to be involved, due to the book's upsetting ending, but was convinced after witnessing his own daughter's reaction to her grandfather's death that year.

...initially Diane and I were not enthusiastic because at the end the grandfather's chair is suddenly empty- he has died. On December 31st that year it happened that my own father was dying in Brighton General Hospital, aged 88, and my daughter Catherine who was then six came with me to visit him. She had had a very similar relationship as that described in the book, since she adored my father who was for ever telling stories and rhymes and jokes which made her laugh. The doctor told us that very sadly he could not last out the week and my daughter said to me: 'Will he go to heaven?' I said: 'I very much hope so' and Catherine with the sublime innocence of youth said: 'Can I come and watch?' This made me laugh despite myself and to see how as children we are able to accept all of life in a way that we find so difficult as adults.

John Coates said that, a month after agreeing to do the film, Blake and Jackson told him that the subject was too dark and they were not going to proceed with it, but several hours of persuasion from Coates brought them back on board.

In Turning the Page: Children's Literature in Performance and the Media Fiona Collins said that while Burningham's book is open ended, with Emily ultimately left alone to contemplate her grandfather's death, the film offers a less "stark" interpretation; his death is explored through her implied remembrance of him in the final scene. Collins felt that was probably because the original offered an unremittingly bleak ending which would be difficult for its intended child audience. The film was entirely financed by Channel 4 and cost over £1 million to make according to Coates. It was first broadcast on the channel on New Year's Eve 1989 at 6:30 pm.

== Music ==
The musical score was written and composed by Howard Blake and is almost in the form of a miniature opera, with many of the tales within the animation sung by the lead characters and children from the Wroughton Middle School choir (winners of BBC Choir of the Year) accompanied by a 40-piece orchestra (the Sinfonia of London).

The end title song "Make Believe" is performed by Sarah Brightman and has the theme of "Auld Lang Syne" as a counter-melody. The song was released as a single at the time.

== Reception ==
The film won the Prix Jeunesse Special Prize in children's television programming in 1990. Rotten Tomatoes called the film "a sensitive and life-affirming animated adaptation".

The "Toonhound" review says that the film takes the tone of the ending of The Snowman even further, "exploring an aspect of life rarely approached in animated form." While writing Dianne Jackson's obituary in 1993, Paul Madden wrote that the film "was less of immediate popular appeal than The Snowman, but was perhaps more satisfying to her creatively, demanding a more subtle approach." Toonhound said, "Just like that film there is a tangible sense of loss at the end; a loss which builds with repeated viewings. You know that Granpa won't be playing with Emily for much longer, and what's more, you're aware that he knows this too."

== Ownership ==
The film has rarely been repeated and has never been released on DVD. A special screening was arranged for Peter Ustinov to see the film, as he had been away in the United States on the day which it was broadcast. After TVS lost their licence in December 1992, they sold their film library, including Granpa. The title went through MTM Enterprises, Family Channel, Fox Kids, and finally Disney. The film was aired for the final time on the 23rd of December 1999. The film is believed to be confined to the Disney Vault.
