= Peter Auty =

British singer (born 1969)

- Born: 1969 (age 55–56); Richmond, North Riding of Yorkshire, England
- Occupations: Choirboy (former); Operatic tenor
- Known for: "Walking in the Air"

Peter Robert Auty (born 1969) is an English operatic tenor who has worked with most of the major opera companies in Britain and a number of companies in continental Europe.

== Choirboy ==
Auty was a choirboy who sang at St Paul's Cathedral. At the age of 13, he sang "Walking in the Air", the theme song of the 1982 animated film The Snowman, but in the rush to finish the film his name was omitted from the credits until the film was remastered for its 20th anniversary in 2002. The composer, Howard Blake, decided to re-record the song for a commercial for Toys "R" Us in 1985. As Auty's voice had broken by that point, Aled Jones was chosen instead and the song became a hit single. Many people assumed that Jones was the singer in the version used in the film.

== Opera singer ==
Auty took the role of Camille in Yorklight Opera Company's production of The Merry Widow in 1995. Subsequently, he moved to the Royal Scottish Academy of Music and Drama, where he studied under Peter Alexander Wilson alongside training with the British Youth Opera. At the summer performance in 1997 of Prokofiev's Betrothal in a Monastery (given as The Duenna), the Opera critic noted "another potentially Wagnerian voice, the tenor Peter Auty, a very young-looking Don Jerome; the voice has that edge of smoky colour one associates with a Siegfried, but still has to settle into its own space and breadth".

Auty's professional stage debut was with Opera North in 1998. With the company, he subsequently sang the roles of Rodolfo in La bohème during the 2001-02 season and Don José in Carmen in 2011. At Covent Garden he played the Major-Domo to the Marschallin in the 2000 run of Der Rosenkavalier under Thielemann, Michelis in the 2000 run of The Greek Passion under Mackerras, Flavio in Norma, Maintop in Billy Budd and a Shepherd in Tristan und Isolde in 2000, Roderigo in Otello, Gastone in La traviata and Third Esquire in Parsifal in 2001, Malcolm in Macbeth in 2002, and Arturo in Lucia di Lammermoor in 2003.

Elsewhere in Britain he sang at Glyndebourne Festival Opera (Rodrigo in Verdi's Otello and Nemorino in Donizetti's L'elisir d'amore). His Don José for the Glyndebourne tour in 2002 was described as "beautifully sung, deeply troubled".

There have also been roles with Scottish Opera and English National Opera. In other parts of Europe he has appeared in many other venues such as Frankfurt and Rouen. For the ENO Rigoletto in 2006, his Duke led a reviewer to comment that his "brilliant top and equally sensitive shaping of lines made him a Duke of real distinction. On this and other recent showings, Auty is surely the finest lyric tenor in the Italian repertoire the UK has produced since the young Dennis O'Neill".

In 2018 he sang the "exhausting" title role in the stage premiere (and UK premiere) of Konstantin Boyarsky's Pushkin at Grange Park Opera. As the only non-Russian in the cast, "Auty coped heroically with Boyarsky's demanding vocal lines, and emphasized Pushkin's ardour and naiveté, nonchalantly delivering the many quotes (in Russian) that pepper the libretto".

Auty has also performed concerts with orchestras both in his home country and abroad, such as the London Symphony Orchestra conducted by Sir Colin Davis, the Iceland Symphony Orchestra conducted by Vladimir Ashkenazy and the Royal Flemish Philharmonic led by Edo de Waart.

== Selected discography ==
- Dvořák: Requiem, Op. 89 - London Philharmonic Choir & Orchestra Neeme Järvi; 2009 (London Philharmonic Orchestra – LPO)
- Brian: Symphony No. 1 'Gothic' - BBC forces under Martyn Brabbins; 2011 (Hyperion)
- Donizetti: L'elisir d'amore (as Nemorino) - Glyndebourne Opera, Maurizio Benini (video); 2010 (Opus Arte)
- Dvořák: Stabat Mater, Op. 58 - London Philharmonic Choir & Orchestra, Neeme Järvi; 2012 (LPO)
- Elgar: The Dream of Gerontius - Royal Flemish Philharmonic, Edo de Waart; 2013 (Pentatone)
- Verdi: Rigoletto (as Borsa) - Royal Opera House Covent Garden, Edward Downes (video); 2013 (Opus Arte)
- Joubert: St. Mark Passion - Wells Cathedral Choir, Matthew Owens; 2017 (Resonus Classics)
