= The Tin-Pot Foreign General and the Old Iron Woman =

Book by Raymond Briggs

First edition

The Tin-Pot Foreign General and the Old Iron Woman (ISBN 0241113628) is a 1984 picture book, ostensibly for very young children, written and illustrated by Raymond Briggs and published by Hamish Hamilton. It satirises the Falklands War of 1982.

The book presents the story of the war in the format of a picture book for young children. It is written in a simple style with large, brightly coloured illustrations. Neither the Falkland Islands, the belligerent countries, nor their leaders are named in the text. Instead, the British prime minister Margaret Thatcher and the Argentine dictator General Galtieri are presented as a pair of metal monsters who send men to fight over a "sad little island" populated by a few shepherds who eat nothing but mutton. The old woman (who is "not real [but] made of Iron") derives from Thatcher's nickname "the Iron Lady", while the General (who is "not real [but] made of Tin Pots") derives from the slang term "tin-pot general" or "tin-pot dictator", meaning a petty authoritarian type.

The book mentions several ways in which soldiers (who were "all real men, made of flesh and blood ... not made of Tin Pots or Iron") were killed or maimed; the pictures accompanying these parts of the text are monochrome pencil sketches, as opposed to the full-colour caricatures in the rest of the book. Following the victory by the soldiers of the Old Iron Woman, there are various celebrations, to which the maimed are not invited in case their appearance spoils the fun.

The refusal of either side to admit responsibility for civilian casualties is satirised with the statement that three of the islanders were killed, but that "no one was to blame".
