= Aled Jones =

Welsh singer, TV presenter and actor (born 1970)

Aled Jones MBE
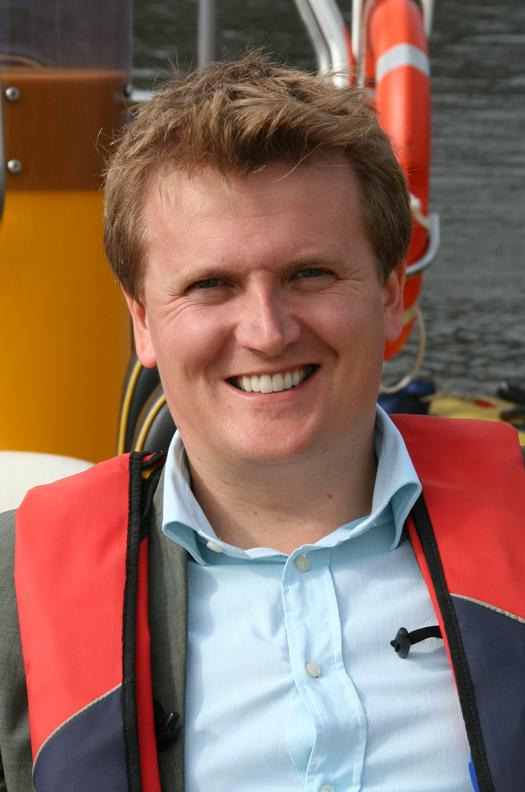
- Jones in 2007
- Born: 29 December 1970 (age 55); Bangor, Wales
- Occupations: Singer; television and radio presenter; actor
- Years active: 1983–present
- Employers: BBC; ITV; Classic FM
- Television: Songs of Praise (since 2004); Cash in the Attic (2010–12); Escape to the Country (2009–13); Daybreak (2012–14); Weekend (2014–17); Too Much TV (2016); Going Back Giving Back (since 2016)
- Spouse: Claire Fossett (m. 2001)
- Children: 2, including Emilia
- Musical career
- Genres: Classical; operatic pop; Christian; pop
- Instrument: Vocals
- Label: Universal Classics & Jazz

Aled Jones (born 29 December 1970) is a Welsh singer, actor, and radio and television presenter. As a teenaged chorister, he gained widespread fame in 1985 with his recording of "Walking in the Air", which reached number five in the UK singles chart. He has since worked in television with the BBC and ITV and also on radio for the BBC and Classic FM.

In September 2012, Jones joined ITV Breakfast, where he presented Daybreak (2012–2014) alongside Lorraine Kelly and Kate Garraway. For the BBC, he has presented Songs of Praise (since 2004), Cash in the Attic (2010–2012), Escape to the Country (2009–2013), and Going Back Giving Back (since 2016).

== Career ==
=== 1970–1990 ===
Jones was born at St David's Hospital, Bangor, Caernarfonshire, the only child of Nest Rowlands, a teacher, and Derek John Jones, a draughtsman for a shipbuilder. He was raised in the small Welsh-speaking community of Llandegfan on Anglesey and attended Ysgol David Hughes (a secondary school). Jones joined the choir of Bangor Cathedral at age nine and was lead soloist within two years, although he was never head chorister. The quality of Jones' treble voice was appreciated by a member of the congregation, Hefina Orwig Evans, who wrote a letter to record company Sain, and Jones was duly signed. In 1982, Jones won the Cerdd Dant solo competitions for competitors under 12 at the Urdd Eisteddfod.

In June 1985, Jones was the subject of an Emmy Award–winning BBC Omnibus documentary entitled "The Treble". Jones, with the National Philharmonic Orchestra, was behind the Santa Claus: The Movie original motion picture soundtrack song "Every Christmas Eve" in 1985. The same year, Jones was employed by Mike Oldfield to sing on his single "Pictures in the Dark", a three-voice song, on which he performed with Anita Hegerland and Barry Palmer.

Jones became famous for the cover version of "Walking in the Air", the song from Channel 4's animated film The Snowman based on the book by Raymond Briggs. The record reached number five in the UK singles chart in 1985. Although it is often reported that Jones sang the version used in the 1982 film, it was actually performed by Peter Auty, a St Paul's Cathedral choirboy.

Jones' first biography, Walking on Air, was published in 1986. Also in 1986, he sang the oratorio Athalia. and sang the theme song for the Siriol Animation film A Winter Story. The song was a modest success, reaching number 51 in the UK.

Jones' recording career was temporarily halted in the late 1980s. By then, he had sung for Pope John Paul II, Queen Elizabeth II, and Charles, Prince of Wales and Diana, Princess of Wales in a private recital, as well as presenting children's television programmes. He sang at the wedding of Bob Geldof and Paula Yates in 1986.

=== 1990s–present ===
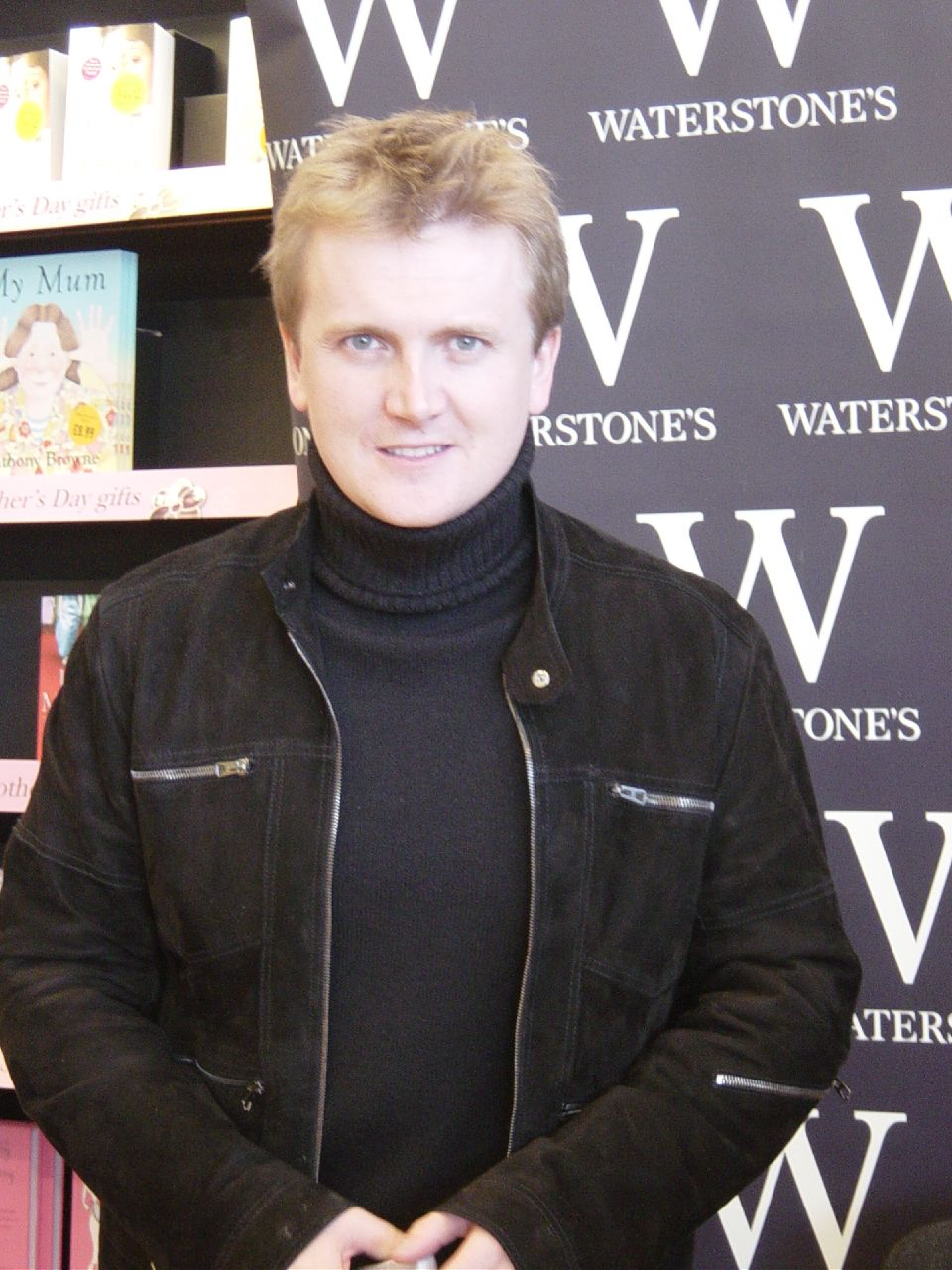
Jones at a book signing in 2006

In September 1990, Jones made his acting debut at the Royal Theatre (Northampton) in Shaun McKenna's adaptation of Richard Llewellyn's How Green Was My Valley, playing the teenage Huw Morgan.

Jones went on to study at the Royal Academy of Music for three years, and the Bristol Old Vic Theatre School, before beginning his adult recording career, which has featured a largely religious/inspirational repertoire. In 1995, he took the leading role in the long-running production of Andrew Lloyd Webber's Joseph and the Amazing Technicolour Dreamcoat at the Blackpool Winter Gardens Opera House stage. From September 1996 to May 1997, Jones played the young Tom Gradgrind (a non-singing role) in a large-scale national touring production of Charles Dickens's Hard Times. Theatres at which the play was presented included Theatre Royal, Brighton, Bath Theatre Royal and Richmond Theatre.

In 2005, Jones launched his autobiography, Aled: The Autobiography, written in collaboration with Darren Henley. In 2013, Jones released his extended autobiography, Aled Jones: My Story.

Following the launch of his first baritone album, Aled, on the Universal Music label in Australia in May 2003, Jones visited the country on a promotional tour. He has since successfully toured in concert there five times: in December 2003, August 2006, October 2008, August and September 2010 and February 2015, performing in eight cities.

Jones released two singles with Terry Wogan in aid of the Children in Need appeal.

From 3 July to 30 August 2008, Jones played the lead role of Caractacus Potts in Chitty Chitty Bang Bang at the Wales Millennium Centre, Cardiff. He returned to the stage, playing Bob Wallace in White Christmas at the Theatre Royal, Plymouth, and at The Lowry, Salford Quays, from November 2009 until 9 January 2010, and again from 11 to 26 November 2011 at the Mayflower Theatre, Southampton, from 1 to 17 December at the Grand Canal Theatre, Dublin, and at the Empire Theatre, Liverpool (22 December 2011 to 7 January 2012). On 8 November 2014, Jones made his West End debut, again playing Bob Wallace in White Christmas, this time at the Dominion Theatre, Tottenham Court Road.

Following the publication of Aled's Forty Favourite Hymns in 2009, a further book, Favourite Christmas Carols, was published on 28 October 2010; Jones took the book on his UK tour in November and December 2010. On 29 November, his CD, Aled's Christmas Gift, was issued to accompany the book.

On 11 October 2010, Jones was confirmed to take over as stand-in presenter of the early morning breakfast slot on BBC Radio 2 following the departure of Sarah Kennedy, a role he occasionally covered in the years leading up to her departure. Jones covered this slot for six weeks until the beginning of his UK tour.

Jones mentored Isabel Suckling, the youngest classical recording artist signed by Decca Records and first choirgirl to sign a record contract with a major music label. Suckling's debut album was strongly endorsed by Jones, who described it as "breathtaking", and it was released on 29 November 2010.

In 2011, Jones hosted the television and DVD series Classical Destinations III, Aled Jones' Ultimate Travel Guide to Classical Music, which was filmed on his travels in the UK, Europe, Scandinavia and Australia.

On 9 November 2018, Jones released In Harmony, a collaboration album with English tenor Russell Watson. They followed on 1 November 2019 with Back in Harmony, which debuted at number 1 on the UK Classical Albums chart.

On 4 November 2022, Jones and Watson released the album Christmas with Aled and Russell. The album debuted at number 1 on the Classical Artists Albums Chart and number 14 on the main albums chart. The album was preceded by two singles; the first, "A Spaceman Came Travelling", was released on 21 October 2022. The second single, "O Holy Night", was released on 4 November 2022. The duo toured the UK in November and December 2022.

In early 2024, Jones toured The Classic Hall of Fame with The Fulltone Orchestra.

== Personal life ==
Jones met his wife, Claire Fossett, in 1995 while he was performing in a production of Joseph and the Amazing Technicolour Dreamcoat in Blackpool. Fossett is a former trapeze artist and member of the Fossett circus family. The couple married on 6 January 2001 at St Paul's Church, Covent Garden. They have two children: a daughter, Emilia, who is a BAFTA-nominated actress, and a son. They live in Barnes, London.

== Broadcasting ==
=== Radio ===
Jones is a presenter on Classic FM. In 2006, he joined the BBC, taking over from Don Maclean on Good Morning Sunday on BBC Radio 2. He was also a presenter of Friday Night is Music Night, and has also been a regular stand-in presenter for Sarah Kennedy and Ken Bruce on Radio 2, until he left Radio 2 in 2012. Jones also presents programmes for BBC Radio 3, such as Choir of the Year and Young Chorister of the Year and The Choir until he left Radio 3 in 2013. On 4 February 2013, it was announced that Jones had returned to Classic FM to present a new three-hour show from 9:00 on Sundays, starting the next month on 3 March. From March 2016, his Sunday breakfast show was shifted to start earlier at 7:00. On 1 June 2026, Jones moved to present the station's weekday mid-morning slot.

=== Television ===
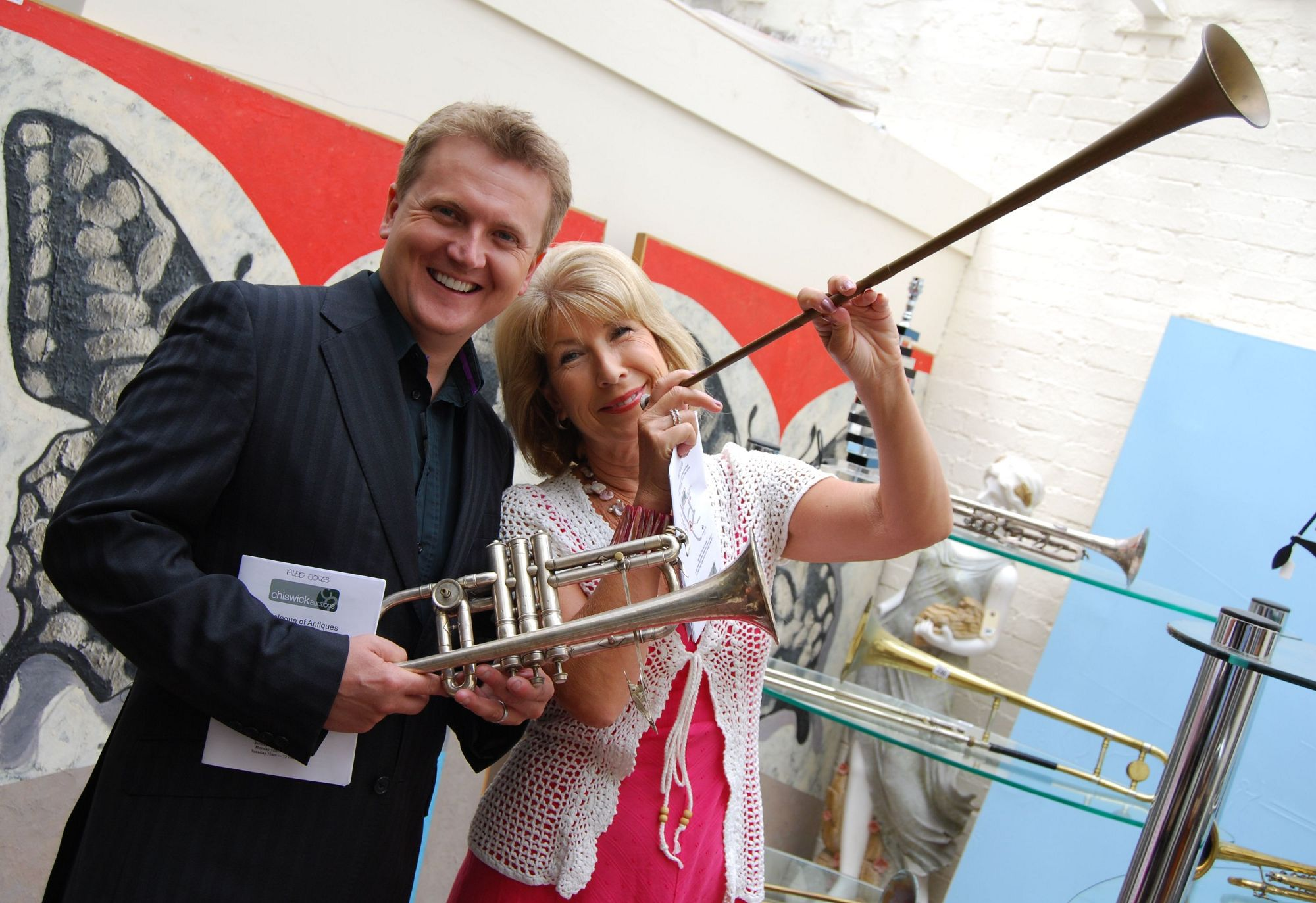
Jones (left) pictured with Jennie Bond, during filming for Cash in the Attic in 2010

As a teenager, Jones presented Chatterbox, a children's chat show made by HTV for ITV, in 1988.

Jones' appearance as a contestant on Strictly Come Dancing in 2004 brought him to the attention of a wider audience, leading to further tours and albums. It also led to increasing demands on him as a broadcaster.

Jones is one of the main presenters of BBC One's Songs of Praise. In 2003, he was the subject of the final episode of This Is Your Life when he was surprised by Michael Aspel while presenting Songs of Praise at the Royal Albert Hall in London. He has also presented the annual "Big Sing", the 50th Anniversary edition from Alexandra Palace in 2011, and the 60th Anniversary edition from Westminster Abbey (3/10/21). Since 2009, Jones has presented editions of Escape to the Country for the BBC. He was also a presenter on Cash in the Attic between 2010 and 2012. In October 2011, he appeared as a guest presenter on The One Show. In 2012, Jones hosted the Australian TV series Classical Destinations III, Aled Jones' Ultimate Travel Guide to Classical Music.

On 4 May 2012, Jones was confirmed as the new presenter of the ITV Breakfast programme Daybreak with Lorraine Kelly and Kate Garraway, replacing Adrian Chiles. On 3 March 2014, it was announced that Daybreak was to be replaced by a new breakfast programme called Good Morning Britain, which Jones would not be a part of. His last episode aired on 25 April 2014. The following day, Jones began hosting Weekend, broadcast every Saturday and Sunday morning from 8:30am.

Since 2012, Jones has presented the annual Christmas Carols on ITV programme, which airs late on Christmas Eve. In 2015, he was a regular reporter for Strictly Come Dancing: It Takes Two, broadcast on BBC Two.

Since February 2016, Jones has co-presented the daily magazine show Too Much TV, for BBC Two.

Since 2016, Jones has presented Going Back Giving Back, a daytime programme for BBC One.

Jones has been on the judging panel for the Pride of Britain Awards twice.

In 2022, Jones appeared on the third series of The Masked Singer as "Traffic Cone".

=== BBC suspension ===
In November 2017, Jones was being investigated by the BBC following allegations of inappropriate behaviour. In the interim, he had agreed to withdraw from programmes. It was subsequently confirmed in January 2018 that the BBC had lifted the suspension and that he would resume presenting programmes.

== Awards and honours ==
On 28 October 2009, Jones was presented with a BASCA Gold Badge Award in recognition of his unique contribution to music.

Jones was appointed Member of the Order of the British Empire (MBE) in the 2013 Birthday Honours for services to music and broadcasting and for charitable services. He collected his award on 17 October 2013.

On 14 February 2014, Jones was nominated as an Honorary Fellow of the Royal Academy of Music; he was presented with the fellowship on 3 July 2014.

== Discography ==
=== Studio and live albums ===
List of studio and live albums, with selected chart positions and certifications
Title	Album details	Peak chart positions		Certifications
Title	Album details	UK	AUS	Certifications
Diolch â Chân / Where E'er You Walk	Released: 1984; Label: Sain (C 894) / 10 Records (CDIX21); Reissued in 1986 as Where E'er You Walk	36	—	
Ave Maria	Released: 1984; Label: Sain (C 904)	—	—	
Voices from the Holy Land (with BBC Welsh Chorus)	Released: April 1985; Label: BBC Records (REC 564)	6	—	BPI: Platinum
All Through the Night (with BBC Welsh Chorus & BBC Welsh Symphony Orchestra)	Released: June 1985; Label: BBC Records (REC 569)	2	—	BPI: Platinum
Aled Jones and the BBC Welsh Chorus (with The BBC Welsh Chorus)	Released: November 1985; Label: BBC Records and Tapes / 10 Records (AJ 1); Note: Christmas album	11	—	BPI: Silver
Athalia (cast recording)	Released: 1986; Label: L'Oiseau-Lyre (417 126-1)	—	—	
Requiem Op.48 / Chichester Psalms (with The Royal Philharmonic Orchestra)	Released: 1986; Label: RPO Records (RPO 8004)	—	—	
Pie Jesu	Released: July 1986; Label: 10 Records (AJ 2)	25	—	BPI: Silver
An Album of Hymns	Released: November 1986; Label: Telstar (STAR 2272)	18	—	BPI: Gold
Aled - Music from the TV Series	Released: March 1987; Label: 10 Records (AJ 3)	52	—	BPI: Silver
Aled	Released: October 2002; Label: Universal Classics (064 479-2)	27	13	BPI: Gold
Higher	Released: September 2003; Label: Universal Classics (986 557-9)	21	43	BPI: Gold
The Christmas Album	Released: November 2004; Label: Universal Classics (986 864-9)	28	—	BPI: Gold
New Horizons	Released: October 2005; Label: Universal Classics (476 3062)	21	83	BPI: Silver
Reason to Believe	Released: October 2007; Label: Universal Classics (173 8932)	15	—	
Aled's Christmas Gift	Released: November 2010; Label: DMG TV (DMGTV 041)	69	—	
Forever	Released: October 2011; Label: DMG TV (DMGTV 043)	46	—	
One Voice	Released: April 2016; Label: Classic FM (CFMD42) / Decca (537 6605)	3	13	BPI: Silver
One Voice at Christmas	Released: November 2016; Label: Classic FM (CFMD50)	22	—	BPI: Silver
One Voice - Believe	Released: November 2017; Label: Classic FM (CFMD55)	17	19	
In Harmony (with Russell Watson)	Released: November 2018; Label: BMG (4050538445336)	8	—	BPI: Silver
Back in Harmony (with Russell Watson)	Released: November 2019; Label: BMG (4050538539288)	7	—	
Blessings	Released: November 2020; Label: BMG (4050538643602)	14	—	
Christmas with Aled and Russell (with Russell Watson)	Released: November 2022; Label: BMG (4050538815108)	14	—	
One Voice Full Circle	Released: 27 October 2023; Label:	—	—	

=== Charted compilation albums ===
List of charted compilation albums, with selected chart positions and certifications
Title	Album details	Peak chart positions		Certifications
Title	Album details	UK	AUS	Certifications
The Very Best of Aled Jones	Released: April 1987 (Australia only); Label: J&B Records (JB295)	—N/a	23	
The Best of Aled Jones	Released: November 1987 (UK only); Label: 10 Records (AJ 5)	59	—N/a	BPI: Silver
You Raise Me Up - The Best Of	Released: November 2006; Label: Universal Classics (476 572-1)	63	—	BPI: Silver
Aled Jones Presents Good Morning Sunday (with various artist)	Released: February 2008; Label: Rhino Records (WMTV071)	12	—	

=== Charted singles ===
List of charted singles, with selected chart positions
Title	Year	Chart positions		Certifications
Title	Year	UK	IRE	Certifications
"Memory"	1985	42	—	
"Walking in the Air"	1985	5	10	BPI: Silver
Pictures in the Dark" (with Mike Oldfield)	1985	50	—	
"A Winter Story"	1986	51	—	
"Walking in the Air" (1987)	1986	92	—	
"Silver Bells"/"Me and My Teddy Bear" (with Terry Wogan)	2009	27	—	

=== Talking books ===
- The Story of Classical Music (2004)
- Famous Composers (2005)
- The Story of Jesus (2006)

=== Videos ===
- Aled Jones – New Born King – A Festival Of Carols From London's Westminster Cathedral (1992)
- Voices From The Holy Land (1985)
- Aled Jones – Carols For Christmas

=== DVDs ===
- The Little Prince featuring Aled Jones (2004)
- The Metropolitan Museum of Art: Carols for Christmas (2004)
- Aled Jones – Christmas Carols (2008)

== Filmography ==
Television

Year	Title	Channel	Role
1987	The Grand Knockout Tournament	BBC1	Herald of the tournament
1988	Chatterbox	ITV	Presenter
2004—	Songs of Praise	BBC One	Regular presenter
2004	Strictly Come Dancing	BBC One	Contestant
2007	Play It Again	BBC One	Himself
2010–2012	Cash in the Attic	BBC One	Presenter
2009–2013	Escape to the Country	BBC One	Presenter
2011	The One Show	BBC One	Guest presenter
2012	Classical Destinations III, Aled Jones' Ultimate Travel Guide to Classical Music	Australian TV channel	Presenter
2012–2014	Daybreak	ITV	Co-presenter
2012–2016	Christmas Carols on ITV	ITV	Presenter
2014–2017	Weekend	ITV	Presenter
2016	Too Much TV	BBC Two	Co-presenter
2016—	Going Back Giving Back	BBC One	Presenter
2017	Jodi's Lovely Letters	BBC One	Presenter
2022	The Masked Singer	ITV	Traffic Cone

Film

Year	Title	Role
2005	Nadolig Aled	Unknown
