= One Voice (Aled Jones album) =

Studio album by Aled Jones
- Released: 1 April 2016
- Recorded: 1986, 2015
- Genre: Classical, folk
- Label: Classic FM

Aled Jones chronology
One Voice	One Voice at Christmas

One Voice is a 2016 classical music album by Welsh singer Aled Jones and produced by Classic FM. The album features classical and folk songs performed by Jones as a duet with recordings of himself that were made when he was 15 years old. Upon release the album went straight into number 1 on the British Classical Artist Albums Chart and reached number 3 on the UK Album Charts.

== Background ==
When he was 15, Aled Jones was a popular boy soprano and made 16 albums before his voice broke. When this happened, his recording company decided not to release one of these albums. the album was then stored in the Jones family airing cupboard surrounded by clothing to prevent it getting damp. The album was rediscovered by Jones' parents. Jones stated that he did not remember recording it but upon hearing it "felt like a proud uncle or father". From there, Jones came up with the idea to release the album with Jones performing duets with his 15-year-old self from the album. One Voice was announced in January 2016 and promoted by Classic FM, where Jones is also a radio presenter.

== Commercial performance ==
Upon release on 1 April 2016, One Voice debuted at number 1 on the UK Classical Chart, where it also remained the following week. On the official UK Albums Chart, Jones beat Justin Bieber and Zayn Malik with One Voice entering at number 6, Jones's first UK top 10 chart position since Walking in the Air in 1985. The album rose to number 4 the next week, though apparently demand outstripped supply of albums which limited any further improvement at the time. It rose again to number 3 the following week.

Jones later announced that he would be performing tracks from One Voice on his 2016 cathedral tour of the United Kingdom. Jones followed the album success up later in the year by releasing One Voice at Christmas, using the same premise of him dueting with himself on Christmas songs.

== Track listing ==
1. "Eriskay Love Lilt"
2. "The Lark in the Clear Air"
3. "Danny Boy"
4. "Come to Me Soothing Sleep"
5. "O Rowan Tree"
6. "Ar Hyd y Nos"
7. "Linden Lea"
8. "The Ash Grove"
9. "Dafydd y Garreg Wen"
10. "The Plough Boy"
11. "Passing By"
12. "O Waly, Waly"
13. "Ye Banks and Braes O'Bonnie Doon"

== Charts ==
=== Weekly charts ===
Chart (2016–17)	Peak position
Australian Albums (ARIA)	13
UK Albums (OCC)	3

=== Year-end charts ===
Chart (2016)	Position
UK Albums (OCC)	100

== Certifications and sales ==
Region	Certification	Certified units/sales
United Kingdom (BPI)	Silver	63,215
