= St David's Hospital, Bangor =

Former hospital in Bangor, Wales

Geography
- Location: Caernarfon Road, Bangor, Gwynedd, Wales

Services
- Beds: 137

History
- Opened: 1913
- Closed: 1994

St David's Hospital, also known as the County Hospital, was a children's and maternity hospital in Bangor, Gwynedd, Wales.

It was established in 1913 as a workhouse infirmary, becoming a military hospital for the war and then became a county hospital in 1930 under Caernarvonshire County Council. It came under the NHS in 1948. It was demolished in 1994 as maternity services moved to Ysbyty Gwynedd and the site was replaced by a retail park.

== Facilities ==
In a parliamentary debate in 1952, Cledwyn Hughes described the hospital as having 78 beds for maternity, 24 for gynaecological cases, and 35 children's cots. At this time the waiting list was over 300.
