= Howard Blake =

English composer (born 1938)

Howard Blake OBE FRAM
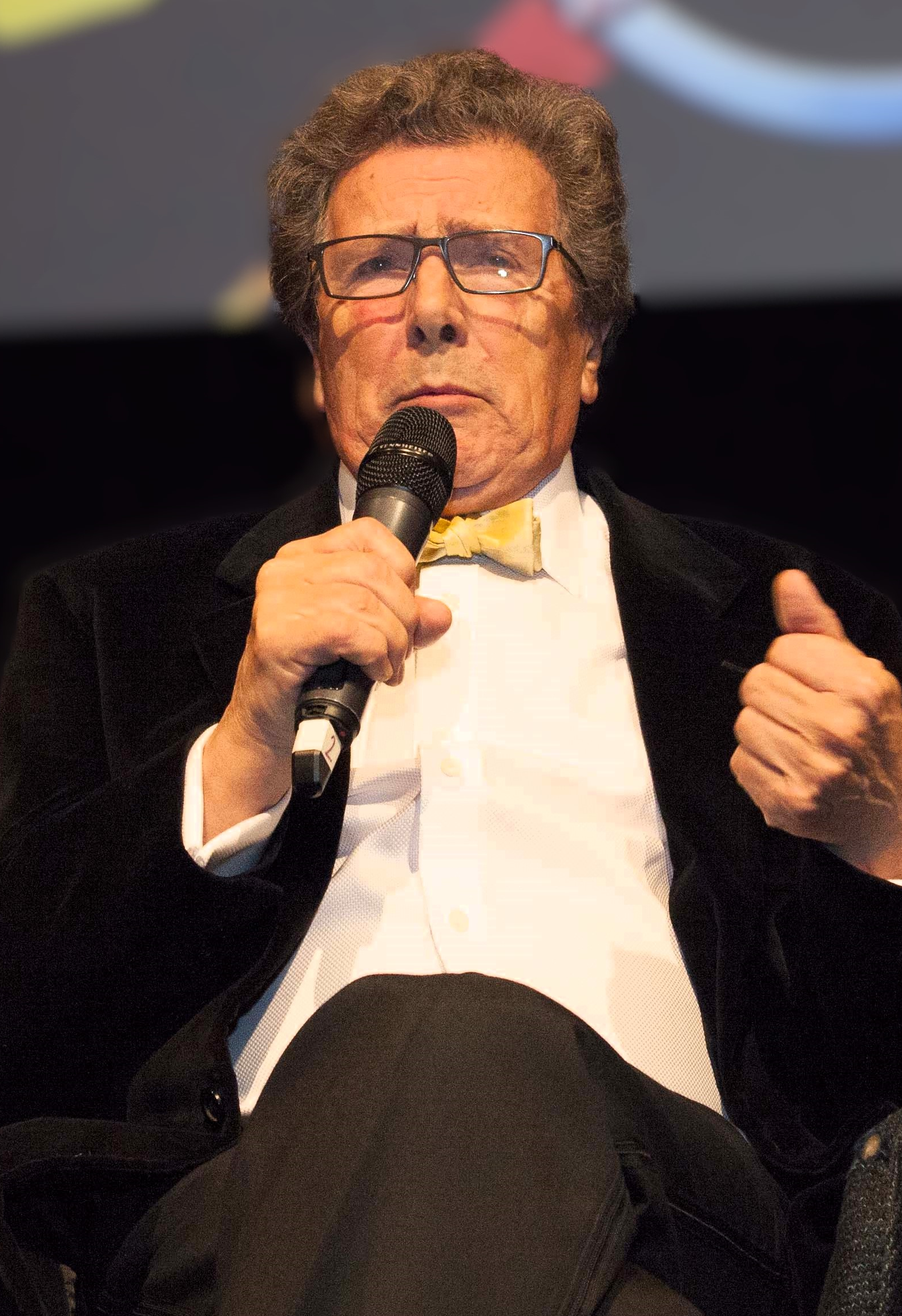
- Blake in 2015
- Born: Howard David Blake; 28 October 1938 (age 87); London, England
- Occupation: Composer
- Known for: The Snowman
- Website: www.howardblake.com

Howard David Blake OBE FRAM (born 28 October 1938) is an English composer, conductor, and pianist whose career has spanned more than 50 years and produced more than 650 works. Blake's most successful work is his soundtrack for Channel 4’s 1982 film The Snowman, which includes the song "Walking in the Air". He is increasingly recognised for his classical works including concertos, oratorios, ballets, operas and many instrumental pieces.

== Early life ==
Howard Blake was born in London and grew up in Brighton. His mother played piano and violin, and his father sang tenor in the church choir. At Brighton, Hove and Sussex Grammar School for Boys, from the age of 11 he sang lead roles in Gilbert and Sullivan operas and was recognised as a good pianist, but few were aware that he was also writing music.

At the age of 18, he won the Hastings Musical Festival Scholarship to the Royal Academy of Music, where he studied piano with Harold Craxton and composition with Howard Ferguson, but he found himself at odds with his contemporaries in regard to musical style. He virtually stopped composing, instead becoming interested in film, and on leaving the Academy briefly worked as a film projectionist at the National Film Theatre.

== Music career ==
Missing music, Blake played the piano in pubs and clubs for a couple of years until being discovered and signed by EMI to make a solo album and work as a session musician on many recordings. This led to work as an arranger and a composer, employment that gradually became his full-time occupation.

In the late 1960s, on the recommendation of Bernard Herrmann, Blake began working as a keyboard player and arranger with veteran screen composer Laurie Johnson on music for the hit ITV television series The Avengers. During the programme's sixth and final season in 1968–1969, Johnson was commissioned to write the soundtrack music for the feature film Hot Millions; to enable him to work on the film score, Johnson recruited Blake to take over composing duties for him, and Blake composed the incidental music for ten complete episodes of that series. In 1970, shortly after the series finished, he lived in a beach hut in Cornwall for about two months, "to get away from it all".

Over an active career he has written numerous film scores, including The Duellists with Ridley Scott and David Puttnam, which gained the Special Jury Award at the Cannes Film Festival in 1977; A Month in the Country with Kenneth Branagh and Colin Firth, which gained him the British Film Institute Anthony Asquith Award for musical excellence in 1989; and The Snowman, which was nominated for an Oscar after its first screening on Channel 4 in 1982, and has won many other prizes internationally. From this, his famous song "Walking in the Air", for which he also wrote the lyrics, was the success that launched Aled Jones in 1985 (although Jones only recorded the song three years after the release of the film, while the song on the soundtrack is sung by the St Paul's chorister Peter Auty). Blake's concert version of The Snowman for narrator and orchestra is now performed worldwide, as is the full-length ballet of the same name, launched in 1997, which in 2013 celebrated its 16th consecutive Christmas season for Sadler's Wells at the Peacock Theatre in London.

Blake has composed many concert works, including the Piano Concerto commissioned by the Philharmonia Orchestra for the 30th birthday of Princess Diana in 1991, in which he also featured as soloist; the Violin Concerto to celebrate the centenary of the City of Leeds in 1993; the cantata to celebrate the 50th Anniversary of the United Nations in 1995, performed in the presence of the Royal Family in Westminster Hall; and the large-scale choral/orchestral work Benedictus, championed by Sir David Willcocks and the Bach Choir, which was given its London premiere in Westminster Cathedral in 1989 with Cardinal Basil Hume as narrator, and which has been widely performed ever since.

More recent works are Lifecycle – 24 pieces for solo piano – recorded for ABC Classics in 2003; Songs of Truth and Glory, the Elgar Commission for the Three Choirs Festival in 2005; and a first recording of The Land of Counterpane a song-cycle to words by Robert Louis Stevenson, recorded at the Usher Hall, Edinburgh, with the Scottish Chamber Orchestra in March 2007, which he conducted.

He is a Fellow of the Royal Academy of Music and, in 1994, received the OBE for services to music. On 20 October 2010 Blake was presented a BASCA Gold Badge Award for outstanding work within the music industry.

=== Collaboration with Queen ===
In 1980, Blake was commissioned to write an orchestral music score for Flash Gordon, in collaboration with rock band Queen who were to record the soundtrack album. He was given ten days to accomplish the task, and after completion fell ill with pneumonia brought on by exhaustion. He recovered, and he and Queen were jointly nominated for a BAFTA Award. It was, however, a disappointment to him that the makers of Flash Gordon did not use much of his work.

== Filmography ==
Year	Title	Role	Notes
1979	Agatha	Hotel Trio No. 1	
1983	The Hunger	Restaurant Pianist	Uncredited, (final film role)

== Compositions ==
- Four Miniatures, Op 7 (1958)
- Symphony No 1, "Impressions of a City", Op. 42 (1967)
- Violin Sonata, Op. 586 (1973/2007)
- Piano Quartet, Op. 179 (1974)
- Penillion for violin and piano, Op. 571 (1975/2005)
- Jazz Dances for violin and piano, Op. 520a (1976/2008)
- The Song of Saint Francis, Op. 248 (1977) cantata for chorus and orchestra
- Benedictus, Op. 282 (1980) dramatic oratorio
- Sinfonietta for brass, Op. 300 (1981)
- Four Songs of Nativity (1990)
- Suite for strings – A Month in the Country, Op. 446(1992)
- Lifecycle, Op. 489 (1996) 24 piano pieces in all 24 major and minor keys
- The Passion of Mary, Op. 577 (2006) dramatic oratorio
- Flute Quintet for flute, two violins, viola and cello

=== Selected film scores ===
- An Elephant Called Slowly (1969)
- Some Will, Some Won't (1970)
- All the Way Up (1970)
- The Duellists (1977)
- The Odd Job (1978)
- The Riddle of the Sands (1979)
- S.O.S. Titanic (1979)
- Flash Gordon (1980)
- The Snowman (1982)
- Amityville 3-D (1983)
- The Lords of Discipline (1983)
- The Hunger (1983) (music director)
- A Month in the Country (1987)
- Granpa (1989)
- The Bear (1998)
- My Life So Far (1999)

=== Concertos ===
- Clarinet Concerto (commissioned by Thea King and premiered by her and the English Chamber Orchestra conducted by the composer 1984)
- Violin Concerto "The Leeds" (commissioned for the 100th anniversary of the City of Leeds, premiered Edinger/Daniel/ENP 1993)
- Piano Concerto (commissioned by The Philharmonia to celebrate the 30th birthday of Diana Princess of Wales, composer as soloist 1991)
- Diversions for cello and orchestra (a cello concerto in 8 movements with a cello part edited with Maurice Gendron 1985)
- Flute Concerto (for flute and string orchestra commissioned by Gabrielle Byam Grounds 1996)
- Toccata (a celebration of the orchestra) commissioned by The Royal Philharmonic Orchestra for their 30th anniversary 1976
- Oboe Concerto (for oboe and string orchestra, composed for David Powell 1971)
- Heartbeat (for tenor saxophone, big band and orchestra, commissioned by the BBC and first performed with soloist Ian Dixson 1990)
