= Ethel & Ernest =

1998 graphic novel by Raymond Briggs

- First edition
- Author: Raymond Briggs
- Illustrator: Raymond Briggs
- Language: English
- Genre: Graphic Novel; Biography
- Publisher: Jonathan Cape
- Publication date: 10 September 1998
- Publication place: United Kingdom
- Media type: Hardback
- ISBN: 0-224-06039-2
- OCLC: 41620728

Ethel & Ernest (subtitled "A True Story") is a 1998 graphic novel by British author and illustrator Raymond Briggs. It tells the story of the lives of Briggs' parents from their first meeting in 1928 to their deaths in 1971.

== Story ==
The story is a chronological progression through poignant moments in the home lives of the titular couple, from when they first meet in 1928 to their deaths in 1971. Ethel, at first a lady's maid, with middle-class aspirations and firm notions of respectable behaviour, becomes a housewife when she marries, and later becomes a clerk in an office during the Second World War. Ernest, five years younger, is an easygoing milkman with socialist ideals and an enthusiastic interest in current affairs and the latest technology. They raise their son, Raymond, living in the same terraced house for 40 years, in a suburban street, through the Great Depression, World War II, the advent of television and other events.

== Awards ==
Ethel & Ernest won the "Best Illustrated Book of the Year" at the 1999 British Book Awards.

== Film adaptation ==
The book was adapted into the feature-length hand-drawn animated film Ethel & Ernest, voiced by Brenda Blethyn, Jim Broadbent and others. The movie featured the Paul McCartney song "In The Blink of an Eye".

Ethel & Ernest premiered at the London Film Festival on 15 October 2016, had a cinema release starting on 28 October 2016, and was broadcast on BBC television on BBC One at 7:30pm on 28 December 2016.

It had its North American premiere at the 2017 Palm Springs International Film Festival by its US distributors, and was chosen by an audience vote to be screened in the "Best of the Fest" on the final day.

In the UK, the film was repeated on BBC Two on 10 August 2022, in light of the news of Briggs' death coming earlier that day.
