= The Bear (1998 film) =

1998 British animated television film

- Based on: The Bear by Raymond Briggs
- Written by: Hilary Audus; Joanna Harrison
- Directed by: Hilary Audus
- Narrated by: Judi Dench (US only)
- Theme music composer: Howard Blake
- Country of origin: United Kingdom
- Original language: English

Production
- Producer: John Coates
- Editor: Taylor Grant
- Running time: 26 minutes
- Production company: TVC London
- Budget: £1.3 million

Original release
- Network: Channel 4
- Release: 24 December 1998

The Bear is a 1998 British animated Christmas special directed by Hilary Audus. Based on the book of the same name by the author Raymond Briggs, the film was produced by TVC London and was first broadcast on Channel 4 in the United Kingdom on Christmas Eve 1998.

The show won a Peabody Award in 1998. In 2000, it won the Golden Butterfly Award for the best short film in the international cinema competition of the 15th Isfahan International Film Festival for Children and Youth in Iran.

Like The Snowman, the film relies only on music and action to convey the story, although for the American version, Judi Dench narrates the film. The musical score was by Howard Blake and the end theme "Somewhere A Star Shines For Everyone" was sung by Charlotte Church.

== Plot ==
A young polar bear cub chases a bird and is captured by seamen on a ship after he is spotted. The bear, now grown up in captivity, looks up at a star before lying down to sleep. The next day, a red haired girl named Tilly is on a day trip to the London Zoo, but accidentally drops her teddy bear into the bear pen. The bear wakes up and spots the teddy, paws at it and carries it off to his cave as Tilly looks on shocked.

That night, Tilly cries over her lost bear and her mother attempts to give her a toy rabbit for her to use as a sleeping comfort. Tilly takes the rabbit, but then throws it on the floor and turns to sleep. Later that night, a figure is seen walking towards Tilly's window — it is the polar bear from the zoo with her lost teddy bear, who lifts her window and enters her room. The bear wakes Tilly up and returns her teddy to her. Tilly looks up surprised to see the polar bear looking at her smiling. Then Tilly yawns and falls asleep again. Then the bear sleeps in Tilly's bed.

The following morning, Tilly wakes up and runs downstairs to get some food for the bear. When she runs upstairs, she finds that the bear has excreted on the stairs. Tilly cleans up the waste and empties it outside before walking into the bathroom and nearly slipping over the bear's urine. Cross, she then mops up the urine and watches on as the bear drinks from the toilet. Then Tilly moves the bear and runs a bath to wash him. He soaks Tilly in the process of getting into it and already beginning to tire of him, she washes the bear. In the kitchen, Tilly dries and brushes the bear and proceeds to feed him with honey. While eating the honey, the bear makes a mess of the kitchen and gets his nose stuck in the jar (to Tilly's amusement). Then Tilly and the bear go to her parents' bedroom and sleep. Tilly wakes up to the sound of the door of her parents returning from work. She hugs her mother and they later sit down to watch The Snowman as the bear walks in and heads out. That night, the bear hides under Tilly's bed as she is put to bed by her mother. Tilly falls asleep and moves over as the bear climbs onto the bed with her.

A gust of wind knocks a snowglobe from Tilly's bedside table, attracting the bear's attention who looks at it, seeing the mother bear and cub looking back at him. Tilly follows the bear outside where he looks at the sky. The pair move to a wide open park area where they meet the Star Bear, which is a bear shaped constellation (like The Great Bear) and the trio embark on a tour around London, showing a wide variety of notable landmarks such as Nelson's Column, and bringing a display of Christmas angels to life with a Father Christmas display also coming to life. Then the trio skate on the frozen River Thames (to the refrains of "Somewhere A Star Shines For Everyone") and travel further to the London Docks where a ship cuts through the ice where Tilly is left stranded but is saved by the bear before the moving ship passes.

The Star Bear looks up to the North Star and the bear looks at Tilly. Tearfully they say goodbye and the bear returns to his own family. The Star Bear returns home with Tilly, who has been given a shining star (the size of a small stone). The Tower of London is seen and the bear pen in the London Zoo as Tilly looks on in amazement. The polar bear returns to his natural habitat to find his family waiting for him. As the sun rises the next morning, Tilly wakes up to find the windows open and the Star Bear's constellation fading. As it does, the shining star vanishes from Tilly's hand, and she wonders about the bear from her window.

== Home media releases ==
The film was released on VHS in the UK before its television premiere in 1998 by Video Collection International under the Channel 4 Video label in 4:3 aspect ratio. The film was released on DVD in 2000 with a now cropped 16:9 ratio.

In the United States, the film was released as a Direct-to-Video release by Buena Vista Home Video in 1998.
