= Father Christmas (1991 film) =

1991 British animated television film

- Directed by: Dave Unwin
- Written by: Raymond Briggs (books)
- Produced by: John Coates
- Starring: Mel Smith (UK); William Dennis Hunt (US)
- Music by: Mike Hewer
- Production companies: Blooming Productions Ltd. TVC London
- Distributed by: Channel 4
- Release date: 24 December 1991 (UK)
- Running time: 26 min (British runtime)
- Country: United Kingdom
- Language: English

Father Christmas is a 1991 British animated short film which adapts two books written by Raymond Briggs: Father Christmas and Father Christmas Goes on Holiday. Produced by Blooming Productions Ltd. at TVC London for Channel 4 Television Company Ltd., in association with Palace Video and GAGA Communications, the film premiered on Channel 4 on Christmas Eve 1991 in Britain, and was the second animated adaptation of Briggs' work made for the channel, following the 1982 animated short The Snowman. The film stars Mel Smith as Father Christmas and was dedicated to the late animator John McGuire.

The story focuses on a stereotypical vision of Father Christmas with a down-to-earth twist, living in contemporary Britain with his pets and reindeer, coping with everyday domestic chores, who recounts a holiday he took before preparing for another Christmas.

== Plot ==
A scene from the film, featuring the main characters of the 1982 film The Snowman based also on Raymond Briggs' original work.

After delivering presents on Christmas Eve, Father Christmas returns to his house in contemporary Britain. As he settles down and warms up, he greets the viewers and explains how he is busy throughout the year caring for his reindeer and pets, tending to his garden and doing the housework and shopping. He mentions that last Summer, fed up with it all, he decided to go on holiday for a change, as the film goes back to the day when he made that decision...

After consulting travel brochures and debating on where to go to, Father Christmas decides on France for his holiday, and converts his sleigh into a camper van. After sadly placing his dog and cat into a kennel, he has his reindeer fly him to his destination.

At first he enjoys the French countryside, but the food he orders at a restaurant makes him ill with indigestion and diarrhoea. After relocating to a campsite with proper amenities to help him cope while he recovers, he is eventually forced to move on when people begin to recognise him. Deciding on Scotland for his next destination, Father Christmas enjoys his time in a local pub and buys a kilt. He awakes next day with a hangover, but hates swimming in the cold waters of a nearby loch. Deciding the cold and the bad weather are not for him, he decides to go to Las Vegas, where he checks into a casino resort. Once there, he greatly enjoys the food, pool and nightlife for a number of weeks. However, he eventually leaves when he runs out of money and is recognised by children. After returning home, he retrieves his pets and prepares to relax, until letters addressed to Father Christmas begin to arrive. He spends the next few months reading through each and sorting out presents.

On Christmas Eve, Father Christmas heads out on his sleigh and begins delivering presents, dealing with the various households he must visit. When he has finished, he goes to the annual snowmen's party at the North Pole and meets James and his snowman, while partaking in the festivities. However, his enjoyment comes to an end when the pair find he forgot to deliver a present to Buckingham Palace. Not wishing to leave the matter unresolved, Father Christmas travels to the palace and delivers them before the dawn of Christmas Day. Back in the present, Father Christmas completes his story to the viewers, before sorting out his dinner for the day and examining the presents he will have waiting, whereupon he wishes the viewers a "Happy Bloomin' Christmas" before going to sleep as dawn breaks outside.

== Links to other works ==
Father Christmas and The Snowman take place in the same universe—both were written by the same author, and both television shorts were made by very similar production teams. It is suggested that this film takes place a year or so after The Snowman, as Father Christmas jokes to the boy "glad you could make it again; the party I mean, not your snowman”, which ultimately gives The Snowman a happy ending. The boy can also be seen wearing the scarf Father Christmas gave him in The Snowman. There is also a poster of the snowman in one of the rooms when Father Christmas is delivering presents. The snowman himself, or a facsimile thereof, can also be seen in Father Christmas' yard during the credits. Mel Smith would later reprise Father Christmas for The Snowman's 20th anniversary opening.

In Father Christmas, Ernest the milkman from Ethel & Ernest can be seen delivering milk to the Royal Family on Christmas morning, and Jim and Hilda Bloggs from Gentleman Jim/When the Wind Blows are shown enjoying a drink in the Scottish pub.

== American version ==
A heavily sanitised version was produced for consumption in the United States of America and Canada. The most notable change is that Father Christmas was re-voiced by William Dennis Hunt, becoming much more jolly than in the original Raymond Briggs books and his motives being changed from being fed up with the snow, wind and narrow chimneys to loving his job and the children expecting him on Christmas Eve night. The song lyrics for “Another Blooming Christmas” and “Poor Old Father Christmas” were rewritten so that almost all instances of the word "blooming" (six in total; five by Father Christmas during the chorus of the former song and one by a child's voice in the latter) were replaced with "merry" despite a few instances of dialogue being kept in around the film. Scenes where Father Christmas gets drunk, over-eats, suffers a hangover, as well as a few candid moments showing his "builders' crack" and sitting on the toilet, were also removed. Some of these changes, excluding the script changes from Mel Smith to William Dennis Hunt, were carried over for the standalone UK DVD release in 2008.

== Canadian Broadcast ==
Father Christmas gained attention in Canada when it was broadcast on CBC, being broadcast through the 90's. The character famously gripes about his feet freezing while delivering presents in Canada before planning a holiday.

== Home video releases ==
The film was originally released on VHS by Palace Video, who co-funded the production of the film with GAGA Communications.

After Palace went out of business, subsequent VHS releases were released by PolyGram Video and later Universal Pictures Video. The film was released on DVD by Universal in 1999 with The Snowman, before being released separately in subsequent home media releases.

== Advertising ==
This version of Father Christmas was featured in some 1990 adverts for Boots which was a year before the animated special, a 2006 advert for KitKat with Mel Smith reprising his role and adverts for Barbour in 2019 and 2020.

== See also ==
- List of Christmas films
- List of films set in Las Vegas
- Santa Claus in film
