= Raymond Briggs =

English illustrator (1934–2022)

Raymond Briggs CBE
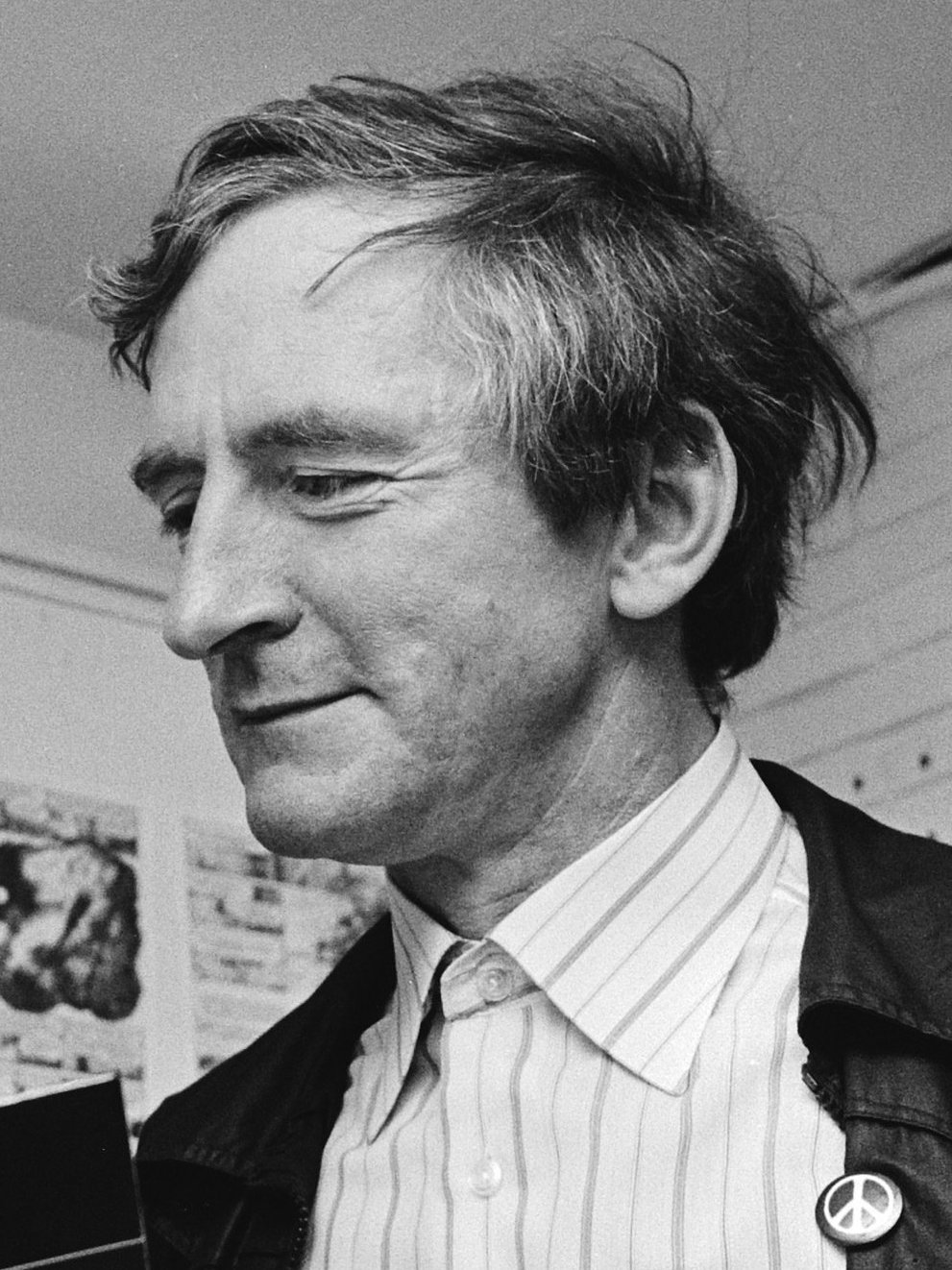
- Briggs in 1983
- Born: Raymond Redvers Briggs; 18 January 1934 Wimbledon, England
- Died: 9 August 2022 (aged 88) Brighton, England
- Areas: Artist; writer; cartoonist; graphic novelist; illustrator
- Notable works: Father Christmas; The Bear; Fungus the Bogeyman; The Snowman; When the Wind Blows; Jim and the Beanstalk; Ug; Ethel & Ernest
- Awards: Kate Greenaway Medal 1966, 1973; Horn Book Award 1979; British Book Award 1993, 1999
- Spouse: Jean Taprell Clarke (m. 1963; died 1973)

Raymond Redvers Briggs CBE (18 January 1934 – 9 August 2022) was an English illustrator, cartoonist, graphic novelist and author. Achieving critical and popular success among adults and children, he is best known in Britain for his 1978 story The Snowman, a book without words whose cartoon adaptation is televised and whose musical adaptation is staged every Christmas.

Briggs won the 1966 and 1973 Kate Greenaway Medals from the British Library Association, recognising the year's best children's book illustration by a British subject. For the 50th anniversary of the Medal (1955–2005), a panel named Father Christmas (1973) one of the top-ten winning works, which composed the ballot for a public election of the nation's favourite. For his contribution as a children's illustrator, Briggs was a runner-up for the Hans Christian Andersen Award in 1984. He was a patron of the Association of Illustrators.

== Early life ==
Raymond Redvers Briggs was born on 18 January 1934 in Wimbledon, Surrey (now London), to Ernest Redvers Briggs (1900–1971), a milkman, and Ethel Bowyer (1895–1971), a former lady's maid-turned-housewife, who married in 1930. During the Second World War, he was evacuated to Dorset before returning to London at the end of the war.

Briggs attended Rutlish School, at that time a grammar school, pursued cartooning from an early age and, despite his father's attempts to discourage him from this unprofitable pursuit, attended the Wimbledon School of Art from 1949 to 1953 to study painting, and Central School of Art to study typography.

From 1953 to 1955, he was a National Service conscript in the Royal Corps of Signals at Catterick, where he was made a draughtsman. After this, he returned to study painting at Slade School of Fine Art, graduating in 1957.

== Career ==
After briefly pursuing painting, he became a professional illustrator, and soon began working in children's books. In 1958, he illustrated Peter and the Piskies: Cornish Folk and Fairy Tales, a fairy tale anthology by Ruth Manning-Sanders that was published by Oxford University Press. They would collaborate again for the Hamish Hamilton Book of Magical Beasts (Hamilton, 1966).

In 1961, Briggs began teaching illustration part-time at Brighton School of Art, which he continued until 1986; one of his students was Chris Riddell, who went on to win three Greenaway Medals. Briggs was a commended runner-up for the 1964 Kate Greenaway Medal (Fee Fi Fo Fum, a collection of nursery rhymes) (Note: Today there are usually eight books on the Greenaway Medal shortlist. According to CCSU, some runners-up were Commended (from 1959) or Highly Commended (from 1974). There were 99 distinctions of both kinds in 44 years including three for 1964, three 1978. There were 31 high commendations in 29 years including Briggs alone for 1978. • Only Chris Riddell has won three Greenaways. Among the fourteen illustrators with two Medals, Briggs is one of seven with one book named to the top ten (1955–2005) and also one of seven with at least one Highly Commended runner-up (1974–2002), led by Helen Oxenbury with two Medals and four HC.) and won the 1966 Medal for illustrating a Hamilton edition of Mother Goose. According to a retrospective presentation by the librarians, The Mother Goose Treasury "is a collection of 408 traditional and well loved poems and nursery rhymes, illustrated with over 800 colour pictures by a young Raymond Briggs".

The first three important works that Briggs both wrote and illustrated were in comics format rather than the separate text and illustrations typical of children's books; all three were published by Hamish Hamilton. Father Christmas (1973) and its sequel Father Christmas Goes on Holiday (1975); both feature a curmudgeonly Father Christmas who complains incessantly about the "blooming snow". For the former, he won his second Greenaway. Much later they were jointly adapted as a film titled Father Christmas. The third early Hamilton "comics" was Fungus the Bogeyman (1977), featuring a day in the life of a working class bogeyman.

The Snowman (Hamilton, 1978) was entirely wordless, and illustrated with only pencil crayons. The work was partly motivated by his previous book; Briggs wrote that "For two years I worked on Fungus, buried amongst muck, slime and words, so... I wanted to do something which was clean, pleasant, fresh and wordless and quick." For that work Briggs was a Highly Commended runner-up for his third Greenaway Medal. An American edition was produced by Random House in the same year, for which Briggs won the Boston Globe–Horn Book Award, picture book category. In 1982, it was adapted by British TV channel Channel 4 as an animated cartoon, with a short narrated introduction by David Bowie. It was nominated for the Academy Award for Best Animated Short Film in 1982, and has since been shown every year on British television (except 1984). On Christmas Eve 2012 the 30th anniversary of the original was marked by the airing of the sequel The Snowman and the Snowdog.

Briggs continued to work in a similar format, but with more adult content, in Gentleman Jim (1980), a sombre look at the daily trials of elderly working class couple Jim and Hilda Bloggs. Briggs said that while the couple was based on his own parents "I like to think my parents weren't quite as dim as they are". When the Wind Blows (1982) confronted the trusting, optimistic Bloggs couple with the horror of nuclear war, and was praised in the House of Commons for its timeliness and originality. It was inspired by Briggs' own outrage at the controversial Protect and Survive pamphlet published by the British government in 1980; the Bloggs couple spend their last days trying to follow its advice. The 1965 pseudo-documentary film The War Game, which depicts Britain in aftermath of a nuclear war, and which Briggs saw at a selected screening upon its release, served as further inspiration. The dense comic strip format, with over 20 frames per page, was inspired by a Swiss publisher's miniature version of Father Christmas. He felt that this gave his stories a cinematic quality, describing the comic strip as a "natural precursor of films, particularly animated films; a strip-cartoon book is a ready-made storyboard." When the Wind Blows was turned into a two-handed radio play with Peter Sallis and Brenda Bruce as Jim and Hilda Bloggs, and subsequently an animated film, featuring John Mills and Peggy Ashcroft. The Tin-Pot Foreign General and the Old Iron Woman (1984) was a denunciation of the Falklands War.

== Personal life and death ==
Briggs was an atheist. In a 2015 interview, he stated that he did not believe in God. Briggs's wife Jean Taprell Clarke, who had schizophrenia, died from leukaemia in 1973, two years after his parents' death. They had no children.

At the end of his life, Briggs lived in a small house in Westmeston, Sussex. His long-term partner, Liz Benjamin, died in October 2015 having had Parkinson's disease. Briggs continued to work on writing and illustrating books.

Briggs died of pneumonia at Royal Sussex County Hospital in Brighton, on 9 August 2022, aged 88. He is buried in East Chiltington.

== Awards and honours ==
Briggs won the 1992 Kurt Maschler Award, or the "Emil", both for writing and for illustrating The Man, a short graphic novel featuring a boy and a homunculus. The award annually recognised one British children's book for integration of text and illustration. His graphic novel Ethel & Ernest, which portrayed his parents' 41-year marriage, won Best Illustrated Book in the 1999 British Book Awards. In 2016, it was turned into a hand-drawn animated film. In 2012, he was the first person to be inducted into the British Comic Awards Hall of Fame.

In 2014, Briggs received the Phoenix Picture Book Award from the Children's Literature Association for The Bear (1994). The award committee stated:

With surprising page-turns, felicitous pauses, and pitch-perfect dialogue, Briggs renders the drama and humour of child–adult and child–bear relations, while questioning the nature of imagination and reality. As a picture book presented in graphic novel format, Briggs's work was ground-breaking when first published and remains cutting edge twenty years later in its creative unity of text and picture.

The biennial Hans Christian Andersen Award conferred by the International Board on Books for Young People is the highest recognition available to a writer or illustrator of children's books. Briggs was one of two runners-up for the illustration award in 1984.

He also won several awards for particular works.

- 1966 Kate Greenaway Medal, for The Mother Goose Treasury
- 1973 Kate Greenaway Medal, for Father Christmas
- 1977 Francis Williams Award for Illustration (Victoria and Albert Museum), for Father Christmas
- 1979 Boston Globe–Horn Book Award (US), for The Snowman
- 1979 Silver Pen Award (Netherlands)
- 1982 Children's Rights Workshop Other Award
- 1982 Francis Williams Award for Illustration, for The Snowman
- 1992 Kurt Maschler Award, for The Man
- 1992 Children's Author of the Year, British Book Awards
- 1998 Illustrated Book of the Year, British Book Awards, for Ethel & Ernest
- 2012 British Comic Awards Hall of Fame
- 2014 Phoenix Picture Book Award for The Bear
- Fee Fi Fo Fum (1964) and The Snowman (1978) were Commended and Highly Commended runners-up for the Greenaway Medal.
- Ug was silver runner-up for the 2001 Nestlé Smarties Book Prize.

The National Portrait Gallery, London, holds several photographic portraits of Briggs in its permanent collection.

Briggs was appointed Commander of the Order of the British Empire (CBE) in the 2017 Birthday Honours for services to literature. A book about his life's work entitled Raymond Briggs: The Illustrators was written by Nicolette Jones and published in 2020.

== Selected works ==
- Peter and the Piskies: Cornish Folk and Fairy Tales (1958), retold by Ruth Manning-Sanders and illustrated by Briggs
- The Fair to Middling (1959), by Arthur Calder-Marshall. Rupert Hart-Davis, London
- The Strange House (1961), by Briggs
- Midnight Adventure (1961), by Briggs
- Ring-a-ring o' Roses (1962), a collection of nursery rhymes
- Sledges to the Rescue (1963), by Briggs
- Fee Fi Fo Fum (1964) – a picture book of nursery rhymes
- The Mother Goose Treasury (Hamilton, 1966), from Mother Goose – winner of the Kate Greenaway Medal
- The Christmas Book (1968), by James Reeves
- Shackleton's Epic Voyage (1969), by Michael Brown
- Jim and the Beanstalk (1971), by Briggs
- Father Christmas (1973), by Briggs – winner of the Kate Greenaway Medal
- Father Christmas Goes on Holiday (1975), by Briggs
- Fungus the Bogeyman (1977), by Briggs
- The Snowman (1978)
- Gentleman Jim (1980), by Briggs
- When the Wind Blows (1982), by Briggs
- The Tin-Pot Foreign General and the Old Iron Woman (1984), by Briggs
- All in a Day (1986), written by Mitsumasa Anno, illustrated by Anno and others
- Unlucky Wally (1987)
- Unlucky Wally 20 Years On (1989)
- The Man (1992), by Briggs
- The Bear (1994), by Briggs
- Ethel & Ernest: A True Story (1998)
- Ug: Boy Genius of the Stone Age (2001), by Briggs
- The Adventures of Bert, by Allan Ahlberg (2001)
- A Bit More Bert, by Allan Ahlberg (2002)
- The Puddleman (2004)
- Notes from the Sofa (2014)
- Time for lights out (2019)

== Adaptations ==
- The Snowman (1982)
- When the Wind Blows (1983) BBC radio adaptation with Peter Sallis and Brenda Bruce
- When the Wind Blows (1983) Little Theatre, Bristol and Whitehall Theatre, London.
- When the Wind Blows (1986) film adaptation with Peggy Ashcroft and John Mills
- Father Christmas (1991)
- The Bear (1998)
- Ivor the Invisible (2001)
- Fungus the Bogeyman (2004)
- Gentleman Jim (2008) BBC radio adaptation
- Father Christmas Stage adaptation by Pins and Needles Productions at the Lyric Hammersmith, 2012
- Fungus the Bogeyman (2015) A 3-part television adaptation, featuring Timothy Spall and Victoria Wood shown on Sky1 in December 2015.
- Ethel & Ernest (2016)
