= World War III in popular culture =

Theme in popular culture

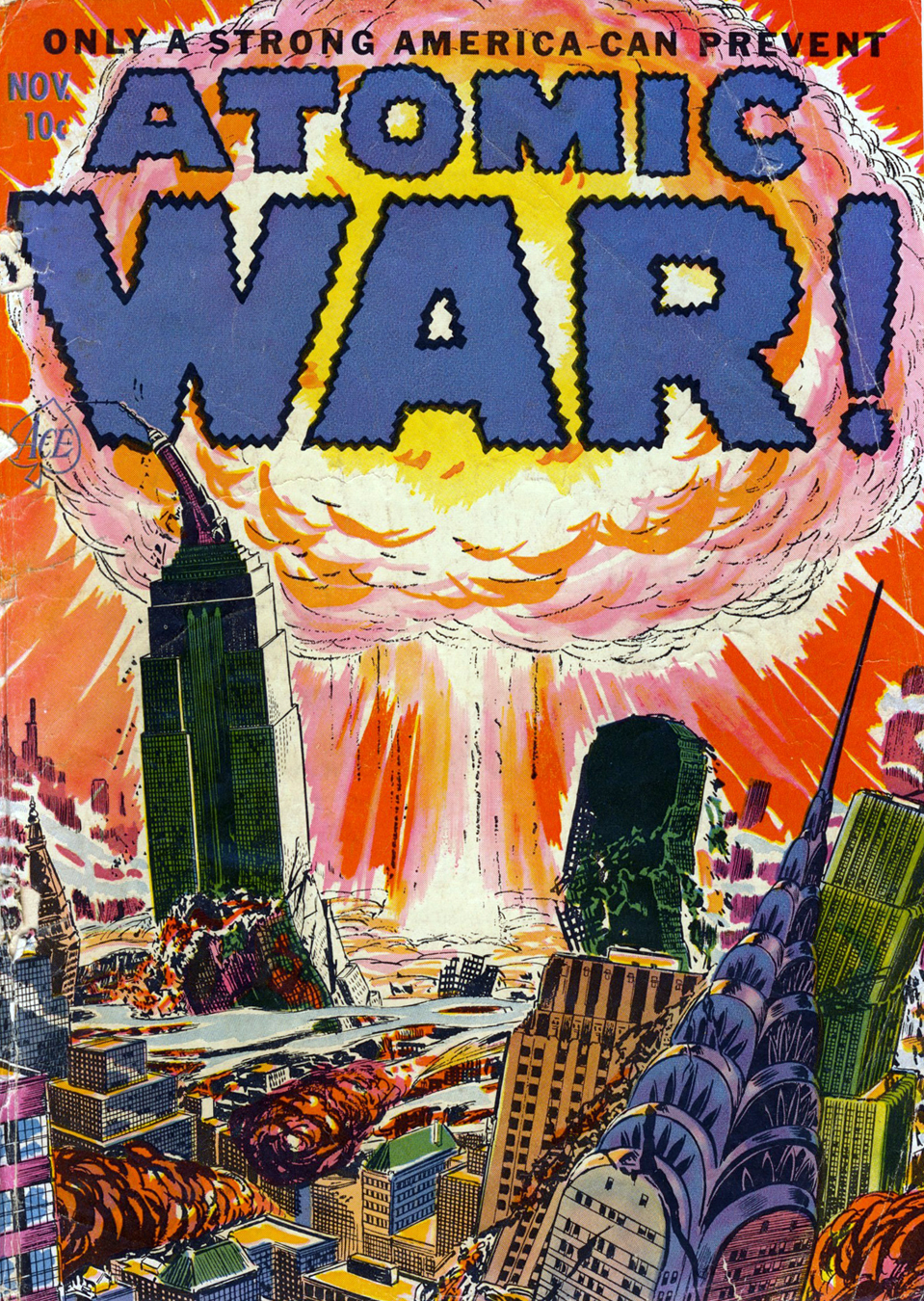
A 1952 comic book cover, with stories speculating on events that could happen in 1960.

World War III, sometimes abbreviated to WWIII, is a common theme in popular culture. Since the 1940s, countless books, films, and television programmes have used the theme of nuclear weapons and a third global war. The presence of the Soviet Union as an international rival armed with nuclear weapons created persistent fears in the United States and vice versa of a nuclear World War III, and popular culture at the time reflected those fears. The theme was also a way of exploring a range of issues beyond nuclear war in the arts. U.S. historian Spencer R. Weart called nuclear weapons a "symbol for the worst of modernity."

During the Cold War, concepts such as mutually assured destruction (MAD) led lawmakers and government officials in both the United States and the Soviet Union to avoid entering a nuclear war. Various scientists and authors, such as Carl Sagan, predicted massive, possibly life-ending destruction of the Earth as the result of such a conflict. Strategic analysts assert that nuclear weapons prevented the United States and the Soviet Union from fighting World War III with conventional weapons. Nevertheless, the possibility of such a war became the basis for speculative fiction, and its simulation in books, films and video games became a way to explore the issues of a war that has thus far not occurred in reality. The only places that a global nuclear war has ever been fought are in expert scenarios, theoretical models, war games, and the art, film, and literature of the nuclear age. The concept of MAD was also the focus of numerous film and television works.

Prescient stories about nuclear war were written before the invention of the atomic bomb. The most notable of them was The World Set Free, written by H. G. Wells in 1914. During World War II, several nuclear war stories were published in science fiction magazines such as Astounding. In Robert A. Heinlein's story "Solution Unsatisfactory," the US develops radioactive dust as the ultimate weapon of war and uses it to destroy Berlin in 1945 and end the war against Germany. The Soviet Union then develops the same weapon independently, and war between it and the US follows.

The atomic bombings of Hiroshima and Nagasaki in 1945 made stories of a future global nuclear war hypothetical rather than fictional. When William Faulkner received the Nobel Prize in Literature in 1949, he spoke about Cold War themes in art, expressing concern that younger writers were too preoccupied with the question of "When will I be blown up?"

== Pre-World War II ==
As early as 1907, H. G. Wells in The War in the Air described a catastrophic global conflict leading to the collapse of civilization, survivors reduced to a semi-medieval life among the ruins.

Wells later released a novel in 1914 entitled The World Set Free in which he details a fictional war fought by nuclear forces where major parts of the European continent are ultimately destroyed as a result of highly powerful weapons of mass destruction.

Both books were inspired by work done by Frederick Soddy in 1903, who was researching radiation and the possibility of radioactive weapons, foretelling ideas that would later become prominent concepts utilized in the Cold War.

== 1930s ==
American cartoonist James Thurber published the short story The Last Flower in November 1939, two months after World War II began. The story predicts a series of world wars, and begins with the line "World War XII, as everybody knows, brought about the collapse of civilization." The book depicts a post-apocalyptic Stone Age human society.

== 1940s ==
The atomic bombings of Hiroshima and Nagasaki ushered in the "atomic age", and the bleak pictures of the bombed-out Japanese cities that were released shortly after the end of World War II became symbols of the new weapons' power.

Around the mid-1940s, American society ushered in the age of atomic music, where different genres of music prompted differing ideas about the age of nuclear weapons. Some music, such as Hawkshaw Hawkins song "When they Found the Atomic Power," promoted development of nuclear weapons as defensive measures against other countries, appealing to people's sense of patriotism during a time of international conflict. Other types of music, however, were not as keen on the idea of promoting the idolization of the Atomic Age. Folk music, rock music, and even some jazz songs, such as "Atomic Cocktail" by Slim Gaillard, cautioned the use of such powerful weapons and warned the American people about what harms can come from such a destructive nuclear power.

On August 29, 1949, the Soviet Union tested its first atomic bomb, codenamed "Joe 1". Its design imitated the American plutonium bomb that was dropped on Nagasaki in 1945.

== 1950s ==
American fears of an impending apocalyptic World War III with the communist bloc were strengthened by the quick succession of the Soviet Union's nuclear bomb test, the Chinese Communist takeover in 1949, and the beginning of the Korean War in 1950. Pundits named the era "the age of anxiety," after W. H. Auden. In 1951, an entire issue of Collier's magazine was devoted to a fictional account of World War III; the issue was entitled "Preview of the War We Do Not Want", in which war begins when the Red Army invades Yugoslavia, and the United States responds by conducting a three-month bombing campaign of Soviet military and industrial targets. The Soviet Union retaliates by bombing New York City, Washington, D.C., Philadelphia and Detroit.

Against that background of dread, there was an outpouring of cinema with frightening themes, particularly in the science fiction genre. Science fiction had previously not been popular with either critics or movie audiences, but it became a viable Hollywood genre during the Cold War. In the 1950s, science fiction had two main themes: the invasion of the Earth by superior, aggressive, and frequently technologically advanced aliens and the dread of atomic weapons, which was typically portrayed as a revolt of nature with irradiated monsters attacking and ravaging entire cities.

In The Day the Earth Stood Still (1951), a flying saucer lands on the National Mall in Washington, DC, and is surrounded by troops and tanks. The alien Klaatu delivers an ultimatum that the Earth must learn to live in peace, or it will be destroyed. The War of the Worlds (1953) has a montage sequence of the countries of Earth joining to fight the Martian invaders, a metaphor for the dangers of nuclear war. The most elaborate science fiction films in the 1950s were This Island Earth (1955) and Forbidden Planet (1956). In the climax of both films, the characters witness the explosion of alien planets, which implies Earth's possible fate. The World, the Flesh and the Devil (1959) is also in the science fiction genre. In it, a man, a woman, and a bigot (the devil) roam New York City after a nuclear war. Only those three characters appear in the film. Also released in 1959 was On the Beach, directed by Stanley Kramer and starring Ava Gardner, Gregory Peck and Fred Astaire. Based on the eponymous novel by Nevil Shute, the film deals with the citizens of Australia as they await radioactive fallout from a catastrophic nuclear war in the Northern Hemisphere. The French author Stefan Wul's 1957 novel Niourk provided a portrait of New York after World War III. The 1959 novel Alas, Babylon depicted the effects of nuclear war on a small town in Florida; a television adaptation was broadcast in 1960.

Nineteen Eighty-Four, George Orwell's dystopian 1949 novel about life after a third World War, rose to cultural prominence in the 1950s. In it, the world has endured a massive atomic war and is politically divided into three totalitarian superstates, which are intentionally locked into a perpetual military stalemate and use the never-ending warfare to subjugate their respective populations.

Anxiety created by Japanese-produced media also facilitated the fear of nuclear threat that Americans were experiencing. Movies such as Godzilla (1954) and I Live in Fear (1955), which later became popular Japanese films within the United States, were heavily inspired by the fear and destruction created by the Hiroshima and Nagasaki Bombings, giving Americans critical insight over the consequences of using such weapons, as well as ideas about what might happen in the event of a nuclear exchange with the increasing production of Hydrogen Bombs by both the United States and the Soviet Union.

== 1960s ==
In the 1960s, media about the threat of nuclear world war gained wide popularity. According to Susan Sontag, films struck people's "imagination of disaster... in the fantasy of living through one's own death and more the death of cities, the destruction of humanity itself." A leading member of the 1960s antiwar movement, the singer-songwriter Bob Dylan evoked the topic of World War III thrice in his LP The Freewheelin' Bob Dylan, in "Masters of War", "Talkin' World War III Blues", and "A Hard Rain's a-Gonna Fall". Philip K. Dick's novel Do Androids Dream of Electric Sheep? (1968), adapted to film in 1982 as Blade Runner, features as its setting an Earth having been damaged greatly by the radioactive fallout of a nuclear war called "World War Terminus."

The 1961 Toho film The Last War showcases the effects of a global nuclear war from the perspective of Japan.

In 1964, three films about the threat of accidental nuclear war were released: Dr. Strangelove, Fail-Safe, and Seven Days in May. Their negative portrayal of nuclear defence prompted the US Air Force to sponsor films such as A Gathering of Eagles to address the potential dangers of nuclear defense publicly.

Dr. Strangelove is a black comedy by Stanley Kubrick about the nuclear arms race between the US and the Soviets and the doctrine of mutually assured-destruction. After a bizarre mental breakdown, the C.O. of a SAC base orders the B-52 wing operating from his base to attack the Soviets. The title character, Dr. Strangelove, is a parody of a composite of Cold War figures, including Wernher von Braun, Henry Kissinger, and Herman Kahn. The secret codename of Operation DROPKICK, mentioned by George C. Scott's character, may be an oblique reference to Operation Dropshot.

The 1964 film Fail-Safe was adapted from a best-selling novel of the same name by Eugene Burdick and Harvey Wheeler. Nuclear disaster is caused by a technological breakdown, which mistakenly launches American bombers to attack the Soviet Union. To prove that it was a mistake and to placate the Soviets, thereby saving the world from nuclear war, the US president orders the destruction of New York City after an American bomber succeeds in destroying Moscow. The film was made in a semi-documentary style and ends just as the explosion over New York City begins.

The War Game (1965), produced by Peter Watkins, deals with a fictional nuclear attack on Britain. This film won the Oscar for Best Documentary but was withheld from broadcast by the BBC for two decades.

In the Star Trek: The Original Series episode "Bread and Circuses," First Officer Spock estimates the death toll of Earth's Third World War at 36 million.

Not only was media film changing within a new world of nuclear possibilities, but other forms of popular culture were also becoming engrossed with the idea of atomic power and destruction. During the 1960s, ideas about mutant creatures created through accidents in atomic weapons testing became a prevalent focus of popular comic books, such as Marvel Comics.

Not only was the idea of mutant villains and monsters due to atomic forces prevalent during this time, but so was the idea of more complicated nuclear superheroes, such as the Incredible Hulk, Spider-Man, and the Fantastic Four. Characters such as these were highly influenced by shifting attitudes surrounding radiation and radioactive exposure prompted by fears created by the Cold War during a time when much of the general public did not understand its effects.

== 1970s ==
The American public's concerns about nuclear weapons and related technology continued to be present in the 1970s. The most talked-about events in the 1970s were the Vietnam War, the Watergate scandal, the Iran hostage crisis, the energy crisis, and stagflation.

In the 1970 film Colossus, a massive artificial intelligence American defense computer becomes sentient, unites with its previously unknown Soviet counterpart, and assumes control of the world's nuclear ICBM arsenal for the "good of mankind" during the Cold War to prevent World War III.

The 1973 oil crisis heightened fears of a peak oil collapse of domestic life. The crisis rationing led to incidents of violence after American truck drivers nationwide chose to strike for two days in December 1973 because they objected to the amount of supplies that the government had rationed for their industry. In Pennsylvania and Ohio, nonstriking truckers were shot at by striking truckers, and in Arkansas, trucks of nonstrikers were attacked with bombs.

The peak oil fears led to the iconic Mad Max movie series in 1979. The desert imagery of Road Warrior showing a resource-drained world became an archetypical default of post-apocalypse worlds. The screenplay writer James McCausland drew heavily from his observations of effects of the 1973 oil crisis on Australian motorists:

Yet there were further signs of the desperate measures individuals would take to ensure mobility. A couple of oil strikes that hit many pumps revealed the ferocity with which Australians would defend their right to fill a tank. Long queues formed at the stations with petrol – and anyone who tried to sneak ahead in the queue met raw violence ... George and I wrote the [Mad Max] script based on the thesis that people would do almost anything to keep vehicles moving and the assumption that nations would not consider the huge costs of providing infrastructure for alternative energy until it was too late.

— James McCausland, writing on peak oil in The Courier-Mail, 2006

On television, the British science fiction series Doctor Who, based a 1972 storyline, Day of the Daleks, on the premise of time travelers from the future attempting to trigger a present-day nuclear war between the superpowers. That is incorrect as the actual story is that the Time Travellers were resistance fighters against the Daleks, who occupied Post War Earth. Their history stated that the person organising the Peace Talks had caused the war by exploding a bomb, which killed the participants in the Peace Talks and caused all sides to declare war on each other. However, the Doctor discovered that the Bomb Attack had actually been caused by one of the Resistance fighters attempting to blow up the house in an attempt to kill the person who set up the Conference and the Daleks who suddenly attacked the house. The Doctor got the participants away from the house just as one of the Resistance fighters blew up the house and the Daleks who invaded the house with it, causing the "Earth Invaded by Daleks" timeline to close.

In the 1977 Robert Aldrich film Twilight's Last Gleaming, a nuclear missile silo is seized by renegade US Air Force officers, who threaten to start World War III if the American government does not reveal secret documents that show that the military needlessly prolonged the Vietnam War.

Also in 1977, Damnation Alley (very loosely based on a novella of the same name by Roger Zelazny), depicts a United States Air Force Missile Wing stationed at a base in the Mojave Desert of Southern California. After a nuclear exchange in the beginning of the film renders the United States a radioactive wasteland plagued by massive dust storms and mutated insects, the survivors from the base set out towards a radio signal they receive from Albany, New York in search of other survivors. The narrow, dangerous passage across country they must take, is named "Damnation Alley."

== 1980s ==
In the early 1980s, there was a feeling of alarm in Europe and North America that a nuclear World War III was imminent. In 1982, 250,000 people protested against nuclear weapons in Bonn, the capital of West Germany. On June 12, 1982, more than 750,000 protesters marched from the UN headquarters building to Central Park in New York City to call for a nuclear freeze. The public accepted the technological certainty of nuclear war but did not have faith in nuclear defence. Tensions came to a head with the NATO exercise Able Archer 83, which, combined with other events like President Reagan's "Evil Empire" speech and the deployment of the Pershing II missile in Western Europe, as well as the erroneous Soviet shoot-down of Korean Air Lines Flight 007, had the Soviets frantically convinced that the West was about to launch an all-out war against them.

These fears were manifested in the popular culture of the time, with images of nuclear war in books, film, music, and television. In the mid-1980s, artists and musicians drew parallels with their time and the 1950s as two key moments in the Cold War.

There was a steady stream of popular music with apocalyptic themes. In 1981, the Dead Kennedys made the song We've Got a Bigger Problem Now, which featured the lines "Welcome to 1984 / Are you ready for the Third World War?" The 1983 hit "99 Luftballons" by Nena tells the story of a young woman who accidentally triggers a nuclear holocaust by releasing balloons. The music video for "Sleeping with the Enemy" had images of the Red Army parading in Red Square, American high school marching bands, and a mushroom cloud. The 1984 hit "Two Tribes" by Frankie Goes to Hollywood had actors resembling Konstantin Chernenko and Ronald Reagan fighting each other amidst a group of cheering people. At the end of their fight, the Earth explodes. Sting's 1986 song "Russians" highlighted links between Nikita Khrushchev's threats to bury the US and Reagan's promise to protect US citizens. Many punk, hardcore and crossover thrash bands of the era, such as The Varukers and Discharge, had lyrics concerning nuclear war, the end of mankind and the destruction of the Earth in much of their early material.

Films and television programs made in the 1980s had different visions of what World War III would be like. Red Dawn (1984) portrayed a near future in which a communist revolution occurs in Mexico, the United States and Britain become strategically isolated from continental Europe, and the Soviet Union is threatened with famine after the failure of the wheat harvest in Ukraine. World War III subsequently begins unexpectedly, with a surprise Soviet and Cuban invasion of the United States, with large portions of the country falling under Soviet occupation. The central United States and China are obliterated with nuclear weapons and Europe remains neutral. A small band of teenagers fight the occupation forces in Colorado using guerrilla tactics, and are ultimately killed by the Spetsnatz. According to the film's epilogue, the United States repulses Soviet forces and wins the war. In the 1983 James Bond film Octopussy, James Bond tries to prevent World War III from being started by a renegade Soviet general. WarGames (1983) had a teenage gamer accidentally hacking the US nuclear defense network and thinking that he had hacked a computer game company, which reveals a potentially-catastrophic flaw in the newly automated system. Spies Like Us depicts US agents in the Soviet Union accidentally launching a missile at the US, which leads one of them to say, "I think we just started World War III."

In the early 1980s, there were a number of films made for television that had World War III as a theme. ABC's The Day After (1983), PBS' Testament (1983), and the BBC's Threads (1984) show a nuclear World War III, against the Soviet Union, which sends its troops marching across Western Europe. Those films inspired many to join the anti-nuclear movement. Threads is notable for its graphically disturbing and realistic depictions of post-nuclear survival and depicts a nuclear strike on Sheffield, the effects of a nuclear winter in the United Kingdom and the complete collapse of human civilization caused by the war.

The Day After was shown on ABC on November 20, 1983, while Soviet-US relations were at their worst, just weeks after the NATO-led Able Archer 83 exercises and less than three months after Korean Air Lines Flight 007 was shot down by Soviet jet interceptors. The film depicts Lawrence, Kansas, after a nuclear war with the Soviets. ABC warned its audience about the graphic nature of the film. The Day After became a political event in itself and was shown in over 40 countries. The shocking and disturbing content discouraged advertisers, but the film had the largest audience for a made-for-TV movie, and influenced the Intermediate-Range Nuclear Forces Treaty negotiations in 1986.

The 1982 NBC miniseries World War III, directed by David Greene, received little critical attention. In the program, a Soviet Spetznaz (Special Forces) raid into Alaska to destroy the Alaska oil pipeline escalates to a full-scale war. The miniseries ends abruptly with the president releasing US nuclear forces against the Soviets. The film ends moments before the world is annihilated with nuclear weapons.

In the 1980s, the techno-thriller became a literary phenomenon in the United States. Such novels about high-tech non-nuclear warfare reasserted the value of conventional weapons by showing how they would be vital in the world's next large scale conflict. Tom Clancy's novels proposed the idea of a technical challenge to the Soviet Union in which World War III could be won using only conventional weapons, without resorting to nuclear weapons. Clancy's detailed explanation of how and why World War III could begin involves oil shortages in the Soviet Union caused by Islamic terrorism within it. The Hunt for Red October (1984) hypothesized that the Soviets' technology would soon be better than the Americans' and depicts a naval buildup in the Atlantic Ocean after the CIA decides to rescue a highly advanced Typhoon-class submarine defecting from the Soviet Union. Red Storm Rising was a detailed account of a fictional coming world war in which the Soviets decide to seize Middle Eastern oil reserves to prevent crippling energy shortages after an Islamist terrorist attack on a major Siberian oil refinery, and they decide to seize Western Europe to prevent American retaliation. The novel subsequently depicts a Soviet invasion of West Germany devolve into a bloody war of attrition because of NATO air superiority over Europe, with a Soviet occupation of Iceland turning the tide by allowing the Soviets air and naval supremacy in the Atlantic Ocean. It ends with the reopening of the Atlantic after the liberation of Iceland and the Soviet Army overthrowing the Politburo before it can resort to the use of nuclear weapons. Soon after the Cold War ended, techno-thriller novels changed from stories about fighting the Soviet Union to narratives about fighting terrorists.

When the Wind Blows, a graphic novel by Raymond Briggs, was published in 1982. The novel is a bitter satire on the Publicized Civil Defense advice given by the British government (Protect and Survive) about how to survive a nuclear war. It has a working-class couple not believing that nuclear war is possible die of radiation sickness after a nuclear explosion and reflects Briggs's participation in the British Campaign for Nuclear Disarmament. Briggs is best known as a writer and illustrator of children's literature, but the novel was written for an older audience and is his bleakest work though the story includes humour. The novel's message greatly affected young adult readers. Briggs rewrote the novel for radio, stage, and an animated film that was released in 1986.

American superhero comics addressed the issue of World War III with the implications of super-powered beings as metaphors for nuclear weapons or using it as character motivation. Marvel Comics gathered many of their Russian super-hero and villain characters into a new group, called "The Soviet Super-Soldiers" which answered directly to the Soviet Government. Uncanny X-Men #150 featured the villain Magneto justifying a takeover bid by stating that if he did not take over the world then and there, that mutantkind would be destroyed along with mankind in the event of a nuclear war. DC Comics' Batman: The Dark Knight Returns ends with World War III erupting over the issue of a military arms race over a small Latin American country, with the Soviet Union launching a specially designed intercontinental ballistic missile at the island. Although Superman deflects the missile to an uninhabited desert, the missile still causes mass chaos in the United States due to the electromagnetic pulse and nuclear winter, but without the mass murdering side-effects of radiation. Batman restores order in Gotham City, causing it to become the most stable city in America and embarrassing the US government. In Batman: The Killing Joke, during his "One Bad Day" speech, the Joker mentions the frequency of World War III nearly erupting over "a flock of geese on a computer screen," and that WWII was started by "an argument over how many telegraph poles Germany owed its war debt creditors." In the same year, the acclaimed Watchmen (set in an alternate timeline) is driven by the threat of nuclear war: the nuclear-powered superhuman Dr. Manhattan has become America's main deterrent to the Soviet Union and his disappearance, which the Soviets exploit, brings the world to the brink of nuclear war. Antagonist characters Adrian Veidt and the Comedian are haunted by the thought of nuclear war, and Veidt's plot revolves around ending the threat of nuclear war by faking the existence of an extraterrestrial threat.

World War III is mentioned several times in the animated sitcom The Simpsons, particularly in future-set episodes.

Other comics used a Third World War as part of their plots: both Britain's V for Vendetta and Strontium Dog's "Portrait of a Mutant" use nuclear war as the backdrop for the establishment of totalitarian governments, with the former having Britain escape a direct hit and the latter showing the country in ruins. Judge Dredd, which already had a devastating World War III as part of its backstory that left most of the world a desert, has an all-out Soviet-American war in "The Apocalypse War". This climaxes with Dredd obliterating the enemy with a nuclear strike, which slaughters "half a billion human beings" and is presented as both necessary to win such a war and morally appalling. Japan's Akira and Ghost in the Shell both start with World War III as part of their backstory, with Japan becoming a world power because it experiences less nuclear fallout than other nations. The science fiction universe of Star Trek touches on the theme of World War III: first the "Eugenics Wars" of 1992–1996, in which nearly 80 genetic superhuman dictators are overthrown at a cost of 37 million dead. However the "Eugenics Wars" were only a prelude to World War III in 2026–2053, during which 600 million are killed.

Nelvana's first film Rock & Rule follows Earth after a World War III in which a new race of humans is born from domestic animals like dogs, cats, and rodents.

== 1990s ==
The Cold War ended without the destructive final global war that had often been envisioned in popular culture, and the public's fears of a World War III were allayed. On the other hand, the previously classified Stanislav Petrov incident of 1983 seemed to imply that the risk of accidental nuclear war because of a possible technical malfunction was greater than had previously been anticipated. The theme of nuclear Armageddon launched by military artificial intelligence computer systems without human decision was explored in the 1991 film Terminator 2: Judgment Day. In the early 1990s and particularly during the Gulf War, tabloid papers and other press discussed whether World War III would be linked to prophecies of Nostradamus concerning a third great war. A World War III crisis was also featured in the 1992 Canadian movie Buried on Sunday in which a separatist island in Nova Scotia threatens to use nuclear missiles from a Russian submarine to strike the US and Canada.

Blast from the Past (1999) is a comedy about a 1960s family caught in the grip of Cold War paranoia. Falsely convinced that World War III has started, they hide in their fallout shelter, only to emerge 35 years later in a world after the Cold War had ended. Jonathan Schell complained to the New York Times that "the post–Cold War generation knows less about nuclear danger than any generation."

Wang Lixiong's 1991 novel Yellow Peril depicts a civil war in China that becomes a nuclear exchange and soon engulfs the world. The novel was banned by the Chinese Communist Party but remained popular.

The 1993 mockumentary Europe on the Brink: War with America, an episode of the BBC current-affairs series Assignment, imagines a potential conflict emerging in 2013 between a united Europe and a United States-Mexico-Canada federation.

World War III is referenced in the 1996 film Star Trek: First Contact. William T. Riker states that 600 million people were killed, most major cities were destroyed, and very few world governments were left after a third World War occurring in 2053. At around the same time, Kim Stanley Robinson featured a character dissecting World War III 40 years after the fact in Green Mars. Robinson's war featured transnational corporations taking over national governments and using them to attack each other in 2061, with 100 million people being killed by the war.

Since the Cold War ended, some stories have presented the conflict as alternate history. The Fallout series of video games, which began in 1997, took place in a world still gripped by Cold War hysteria late into the 21st century. That and other factors led to a World War III between the global powers (notably the US and China), and the series involves exploring what is left of the US after the conflict. Fallout is considered a spiritual successor to 1988's Wasteland, which involved a similar premise and also mentions World War III.

In the 1998 ZDF/TLC mockumentary Der Dritte Weltkrieg, consisting largely of real-life footage of military and political figures presented out of context, Mikhail Gorbachev is ousted by an anti-reformist coup in October 1989 during his visit to East Germany, with the Soviet Union still in effective control of Eastern Europe, and hardline rulers still firmly entrenched in nearly all of the satellite states since the events of that autumn are either brutally repressed by "Chinese" methods or simply never occur. The actions of the paranoid ruthless new General Secretary lead first to a brief conventional war (the filmmakers accessed previously classified war plans and consulted numerous high-ranking military officials on both sides). Just when the conflict seems to have ended, a Soviet radar malfunction, while US forces are on full SIOP alert, which results in a civilization-killing nuclear exchange ("There is no further historical record of what happens next"). After the "ending," just as the annihilation begins, the film rewinds to Gorbachev in East Berlin, and actually concludes with a montage of celebrations in Berlin as the Berlin Wall is freely crossed, danced upon, and dismantled and the country is reunited ("History... took a different path").

== 2000s ==
After the September 11, 2001 attacks, commonly known as 9/11, a scenario of World War III beginning as a result of a nuclear or other catastrophic terrorist attack became prominent. Terrorism in the form of nuclear, chemical, or biological attacks now occupy the place in popular culture once held by the vision of a nuclear World War III between world powers.

Chain of Command is a 2000 political thriller TV film which portrays a war between the US and China. Paramount Pictures released a film adaptation of Tom Clancy's The Sum of All Fears in 2002. The film had begun production before 9/11 and was originally intended as an escapist thriller in which the CIA analyst Jack Ryan fights Neo-Nazis who conspire to detonate a nuclear weapon at an association football game to start a nuclear war between Russia and the United States. However, the film's release just seven months after 9/11 made it very topical. Phil Alden Robinson, the film's director, commented that "a year ago, you'd have said, 'great popcorn film,'.... Today you say, 'that's about the world I live in.'" There was an aggressive promotional campaign, with movie trailers and television commercials showing the nuclear destruction of a city and a special premiere for politicians in Washington, DC.

Later in the decade, World War III had also become the topic of several popular video games, reflecting the trend towards increased public consciousness of the possibility of a future global war. In 2008, games such as Tom Clancy's EndWar, Battlefield: Bad Company, and Frontlines: Fuel of War all painted scenarios about a third World War driven by the need for resources on the part of the various combatants. Similarly, 2009's Star Ocean: The Last Hope is set in a universe in which humanity explored space after a destructive global conflict on Earth. Call of Duty: Modern Warfare 2 (2009) and its 2011 sequel Call of Duty: Modern Warfare 3 are also examples. At the end of the latter's launch advertisement, the "W" in "WW3" flips itself to read "MW3". The games feature a global war between the United States and Russia after the former are framed for a massacre at a Moscow airport committed by Russian ultranationalists, followed by the Russian forces invading the eastern seaboard of North America and Western Europe. Battlefield 3 (2011), on the other hand, follows The Sum of All Fears's example, portraying Iranian terrorists stealing portable atomic weapons from Russia for the purpose of provoking a war between them and the United States. Other games such as World in Conflict (2007) and Turning Point: Fall of Liberty (2008) take place in alternate histories in which global war is a reality, the former being a war between the United States and the Soviet Union and the latter being a war between the United States and a much stronger Nazi Germany that won World War II, both games depicting an invasion of America. The Fallout series continued to portray the aftermath of nuclear war with its entries, Fallout 3 (2008) and Fallout: New Vegas (2010). DEFCON (2007) places players in charge of preparing for and fighting a nuclear war with other human or computer-generated players attacking from and defending different sectors of planet Earth. Its simple 1980s-style vector graphics are inspired by those seen in the 1983 film WarGames.

In 2000, a made-for-TV remake of Fail Safe was produced that remained set in the 1960s time period depicted in the novel.

In 2002, the novel Metro 2033, written by Dmitry Glukhovsky, was released, which revolved around the survivors of a post-nuclear apocalyptic world within the Moscow subway system. It is never specified how the nuclear war begins, but through a combination of overwhelming biological and nuclear strikes occurred around the world, creating supernatural anomalies and new, heavily mutated animal species. Humanity, at least in urban areas, was forced underground into the Moscow subway system and eventually developed rudimentary civilization there in settlements based around the stations. The primary story centers around the character of Artyom, a Stalker from one of the fringe stations within the Moscow, traveling to find help for his home, which is under attack by very advanced, very intelligent mutants. This novel was eventually expanded into a media franchise encompassing multiple books and three video games, the first of which is an adaptation of the novel's events, the second, Metro: Last Light, which sees Artyom struggling to prevent the Moscow network from annihilating itself in a factional war, and the third, Metro Exodus, which revolves around Artyom and a group of fellow stalkers leaving Moscow and traveling through Russia by train in search of a new place to live.

== 2010s ==
World War III and its predicted aftermath continued to be portrayed in popular media around the world such as in recent video games Homefront (2011), and the Metro franchise – Metro 2033 (2010), Metro: Last Light (2013), Metro Exodus (2019).

Ace Combat: Assault Horizon (2011) starts with a Russian Rebellion taking control of Russia and starting a war against NATO. Wargame: European Escalation (2012) is an RTS game that simulates full-scale conventional warfare between NATO and the Warsaw Pact between 1975 and 1985. The scenario of World War III was also seen in the film X-Men: First Class (2011), where Sebastian Shaw, Emma Frost, and the Hellfire Club planned to support a third World War to destroy the humans and evolve the mutants so that the Hellfire Club could establish its rule over the Earth. Some other films that portray a world like World War III are Red Dawn, a remake of the 1984 movie which features an invasion by North Korea and Russia of the United States; Tomorrow, When The War Began, which portrays an invasion of Australia by a coalition of Asian nations; and the 2010 Croatian film The Show Must Go On. A scenario involving World War III is also seen in Hunter Killer in which a rogue Russian minister attempts a coup and American forces must fight his forces to avert further escalation of the conflict. The Unthinkable is a 2018 movie that depicts a Russian invasion of Sweden and Europe. The Wolf's Call is a 2019 French film that portrays a French Rubis-class submarine caught in the middle of an armed conflict between the West and a Russian-Iranian alliance. "World War III: Inside the War Room" is a 2016 docudrama that details a war between NATO and Russia after Putin invades Latvia in a fight like the Russo-Ukrainian War. Steel Rain is a 2017 South Korean film that portrays a North Korean coup to instigate a war against South Korea and the United States with the aid of China. World War III is further referenced in the Japanese anime Steins;Gate (2011) in which Rintaro Okabe must travel through various world timelines to prevent a new world arms race after the discovery of time travel and would eventually envelop the planet in a global war over the technology. Another anime, AKB0048 (2012–2013), takes place 48 years after an interplanetary war destroyed all on Earth and forced humanity to flee to other inhabitable planets.

World War III scenarios have also been seen in certain TV shows. Salvation depicts a moment in which a meteor is about to hit Earth and a brief fight occurs between the United States and Russia. Occupied is a Norwegian TV series that depicts a fictional future in which Russia, with support from the European Union, occupies Norway to restore its oil and gas production. SEAL Team has an episode in which the Navy SEALs must avert war with Russia and China after trying to extract a Russian defector inside Chinese borders.

The science fiction novel Sing Goddess The Wrath of the Fonz; Smokepit Fairytales Part II by Tripp Ainsworth centers around the Iliad in eastern Europe during a fictional third world war.

== 2020s ==
Shortly after the airstrike in which US forces killed the Iranian Quds Force commander Qasem Soleimani and the Iraqi militia commander Abu Mahdi al-Muhandis in January 2020, Internet memes regarding a third World War (which technically would have been a war between the US and Iran) and the draft procedure began to spread on various social media platforms. Similar memes about World War III and the draft emerged in reaction to the 2022 Russian invasion of Ukraine, and later to the 2026 Iran war. The prevention of a World War III is the premise of the 2020 film Tenet. The 2020 novel Rogue Flag deals with the premise of a micronation starting a war between NATO and the Shanghai Cooperation Organisation.

In the first episode of Star Trek: Strange New Worlds, Captain Pike addresses a human-like species nearing its own destruction in war, showing them a video of a World War III on Earth as an example of what to avoid.

The American Psychological Association conducted a survey in 2022 after the Russian invasion of Ukraine, finding that almost seven in 10 Americans thought the world was in the beginning stages of World War III. A fundraising email sent by Donald Trump in November 2023 alleged that Joe Biden was pushing the USA "closer" to World War III.

In the 2026 Steven Spielberg film Disclosure Day, the world stands poised on the brink of World War III, but due to theft of a piece of extraterrestrial technology and related files from secret arm of the U.S. government and subsequent world-wide transmission, which reveals to the stunned world historical evidence of extraterrestrial encounters and the ensuing government cover-ups, the seemingly imminent world war was halted before it began.

== See also ==
- Nuclear weapons in popular culture
