= James Reston =

American journalist and newspaper editor (1909–1995)

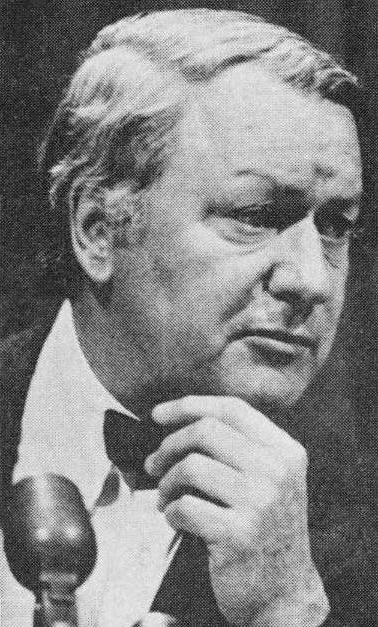
- Reston circa 1972
- Born: James Barrett Reston; November 3, 1909; Clydebank, Dunbartonshire, Scotland
- Died: December 6, 1995 (aged 86); Washington, D.C., U.S.
- Education: University of Illinois (B.A., 1932)
- Occupations: Columnist, editor
- Notable credit: The New York Times
- Spouse: Sarah Jane "Sally" Fulton
- Children: 3, including James Jr.

James "Scotty" Barrett Reston (November 3, 1909 – December 6, 1995) was an American journalist whose career spanned the mid-1930s to the early 1990s. He was associated for many years with The New York Times.

== Early life and education ==
Reston was born in Clydebank, Scotland, into a poor, devout Scottish Presbyterian family. In September 1920, Reston emigrated with his mother and sister to New York City as steerage passengers on board the SS Mobile, and arrived and were inspected at Ellis Island.

The family settled in the Dayton, Ohio area, and Reston graduated from Oakwood High School in Oakwood, Ohio. In 1927, he was a medalist in the first Ohio High School Golf Championship. He was the Ohio Public Links champion in 1931, and in 1932 was a member of the University of Illinois' Big Ten championship team.

While at Illinois, he was a member of Sigma Pi fraternity and was a roommate of John C. Evans, a Sigma Pi brother.

== Career ==
After working briefly for the Springfield, Ohio, Daily News, he joined the Associated Press in 1934. He moved to the London bureau of The New York Times in 1939, but returned to New York in 1940.

In 1942, he took a leave of absence to establish a U.S. Office of War Information in London. In 1945, following the end of World War II, he rejoined The New York Times as a national correspondent in Washington, D.C..

In 1948, he was appointed diplomatic correspondent. In 1953, he became bureau chief and columnist.

Reston served as associate editor of The New York Times from 1964 to 1968, executive editor from 1968 to 1969, and vice president from 1969 to 1974. He wrote a nationally syndicated column from 1974 until 1987, when he became a senior columnist. During the Nixon administration, he was on U.S. president Richard Nixon's list of political opponents.

Reston was elected to the American Philosophical Society in 1980.

Reston interviewed many of the world's leaders and wrote extensively about the leading events and issues of his time. He interviewed President John F. Kennedy immediately after the 1961 Vienna summit with Nikita Khrushchev on the heels of the Bay of Pigs invasion.

In 1989, Reston retired from The New York Times.

In his 2013 book, The Brothers: John Foster Dulles, Allen Dulles, and Their Secret World War, Stephen Kinzer portrayed Reston as a key contact for Central Intelligence Agency director Allen Dulles, alleging that he collaborated with the CIA's Operation Mockingbird, in which the agency sought to influence global reporting and journalism.

== Personal life ==
Reston married Sarah Jane Fulton on December 24, 1935, after meeting her at the University of Illinois. They had three sons: Richard, for many years a Washington & foreign correspondent (Moscow & London) for the Los Angeles Times and later publisher and editor of the Vineyard Gazette, a newspaper on Martha's Vineyard, James, a journalist, non-fiction writer, and playwright; Thomas, formerly Deputy Assistant Secretary of State for public affairs and the deputy spokesman for the U.S. State Department;

Reston died on December 6, 1995, in Washington, D.C., at age 86.

== Works ==
Reston's books include:

- Prelude to Victory (1942)
- The Artillery of the Press: Its Influence on American Foreign Policy (1967)
- Sketches in the Sand (1967)
- Deadline: A Memoir (1991) (memoir)

== Awards ==
Reston won the Pulitzer Prize twice. The first was in 1945, for his coverage of the Dumbarton Oaks Conference, particularly an exclusive series that detailed how the delegates planned to set up the United Nations. Decades later, he revealed that his source was a copy boy with The New York Times who was a member of the Chinese delegation. He received the second award in 1957 for his national correspondence, especially "his five-part analysis of the effect of President Eisenhower's illness on the functioning of the executive branch of the federal government".

In 1955, he was given the Raymond Clapper Memorial Award by the American Society of Newspaper Editors.

In 1986, he was one of twelve recipients of the Medal of Liberty. He received the Presidential Medal of Freedom in 1986 and the Four Freedoms Award in 1991.

He was also awarded the chevalier of the Légion d'honneur from France, the Order of St. Olav from Norway, Order of Merit from Chile, the Order of Leopold from Belgium, and honorary degrees from 28 universities.

== Legacy ==
Writing in The Washington Post shortly after Reston's death, Bart Barnes observed that "Mr. Reston's work was required reading for top government officials, with whom he sometimes cultivated a professional symbiosis; he would be their sounding board and they would be his news sources." But former Times editor R. W. Apple Jr. noted in Reston's obituary that he "was forgiving of the frailties of soldiers, statesmen and party hacks—too forgiving, some of his critics said, because he was too close to them".

Reston had a particularly close relationship with Henry Kissinger and became one of his stalwart supporters in the media. At least eighteen conversations between the two are captured in transcripts released by the Department of State in response to FOIA requests. They document Reston volunteering to approach fellow Times columnist Anthony Lewis to ask him to moderate his anti-Kissinger texts and offering to plant a question in a press conference for the secretary.

A. G. Noornai, reviewing the 2002 biography of Reston, described how his closeness to Kissinger later damaged him further:

Nixon had been re-elected. Kissinger returned from Paris with a peace deal. Reston praised him highly. Nixon, however, decided to bomb North Vietnam to demonstrate his support for the South. Reston did a story on December 13, 1972, based on his talks with Kissinger citing obstruction by Saigon, which was true. But he did not, could not, report what Kissinger had suppressed from him—he was privy to the decision to bomb Hanoi. That happened five days after the story was published. Kissinger now tried to distance himself from it and Reston was taken in by his claims. Kissinger "undoubtedly opposes" the bombing, he wrote and tried to explain Kissinger's compulsions. Reston's line had not gone unnoticed. The December 13 column was the last straw. It harmed his reputation. Reston had spiked the Pentagon reporter's story because it conflicted with his perceptions. The reporter was proved right.

In his review of Reston's memoir, Eric Alterman wrote in The Columbia Journalism Review:

To read Reston on Henry Kissinger today is, as it was during the Nixon administration, a little embarrassing. (Reston once titled one of his columns "By Henry Kissinger with James Reston".) Nothing in his experience in Washington, Reston says over and over in these memoirs, "was ever quite as good or as bad as the fashionable opinion of the day", and he thinks of Kissinger as a prime example of this. [...] But in praising Kissinger, Reston is praising a man who regularly misled him, who wiretapped NSC staff members to determine who was leaking to reporters when they revealed his unconstitutional maneuverings, and who urged Nixon to prosecute Reston's newspaper for its constitutionally protected publication of the Pentagon Papers. During the infamous 1972 Christmas bombing of North Vietnam, Reston wrote of Kissinger that "he has said nothing in public about the bombing in North Vietnam, which he undoubtedly opposes.... If the bombing goes on ... Mr. Kissinger will be free to resign." The only problem with the interpretation, however, was that the bombings were Kissinger's idea. He misled Reston about his own position and then misled the White House staff about these conversations, finally admitting the truth when confronted with his phone records.

Reston also displayed his affinity for the powerful when Edward Kennedy drove his car off the bridge at Chappaquiddick Island, resulting in the death of Mary Jo Kopechne. Summering at nearby Martha's Vineyard, Reston filed the first account of the incident for The New York Times; his opening paragraph began "Tragedy has again struck the Kennedy family." Managing editor A. M. Rosenthal edited the text to make Kopechne the subject.

=== Acupuncture ===
Reston wrote for the Times that in July 1971, he suffered appendicitis while visiting China with his wife. After his appendix was removed through conventional surgery at the Anti-Imperialist Hospital in Beijing, his post-operative pain was treated by Li Chang-yuan with acupuncture that "sent ripples of pain racing through my limbs and, at least, had the effect of diverting my attention from the distress in my stomach." Paul U. Unschuld, an academic translator of traditional Chinese medical texts, credits Reston's article with the rise of traditional Chinese medicine in the body of alternative medicine of the West. There were popular misconceptions at the time that the acupuncture was used instead of anasthetics during the operation itself, but this was false, with Reston having been given a standard injection of benzocaine and lidocaine to anasthetise him prior to the operation.

=== Cultural references ===
In the 1962 novel Fail-Safe, by Eugene Burdick and Harvey Wheeler, the unnamed President of the United States refers to Reston during an impending nuclear crisis when he says that "someone will crack and start to call Scotty or one of the wire services or some damn thing."

=== Portrayals ===
Reston is played by Kenneth Welsh in the TV movie Kissinger and Nixon.

== See also ==
- Afghanistanism
- Operation Mockingbird
