= Red Alert (novel) =

1958 English-language fiction book by Peter George

- 1st edition, originally titled Two Hours to Doom
- Author: Peter Bryant (pseudonym of Peter George)
- Original title: Two Hours to Doom
- Publisher: T. V. Boardman
- Publication date: 1958
- Publication place: United Kingdom
- Media type: Print
- Pages: 192 pp (first edition)
- OCLC: 50737632

Red Alert is a 1958 novel by Peter George about nuclear war. The book provided the underlying narrative structure for Stanley Kubrick's 1964 film Dr. Strangelove or: How I Learned to Stop Worrying and Love the Bomb. Kubrick's film differs significantly from the novel in that the film is a black comedy.

Originally published in the UK as Two Hours to Doom, with George using the pseudonym "Peter Bryant" (Bryan Peters for the French translation, 120 minutes pour sauver le monde), the novel deals with the apocalyptic threat of nuclear war and the almost absurd ease with which it can be triggered. A genre of such topical fiction, of which Red Alert was among the earliest examples, sprang up in the late 1950s led by Nevil Shute's On the Beach.

Eugene Burdick and Harvey Wheeler's later best-seller, Fail-Safe, so closely resembled Red Alert in its premise that George sued on the charge of copyright infringement, resulting in an out-of-court settlement. Both novels would go on to inspire very different films that would both be released in 1964 by the same studio (Columbia Pictures): Stanley Kubrick's Dr. Strangelove or: How I Learned to Stop Worrying and Love the Bomb and Sidney Lumet's Fail Safe.

== Plot ==
In a paranoid delusion, moribund U.S. Air Force general Quinten unilaterally launches an airborne preventive nuclear attack upon the Soviet Union from his command at the Sonora, Texas, Strategic Air Command (SAC) bomber base by ordering the 843rd Bomb Wing to attack using "Wing Attack Plan R", an operational plan which authorises a lower-echelon SAC commander to retaliate after an enemy first strike has decapitated the U.S. government. He attacks with the entire B-52 bomber wing of new aircraft, each armed with two nuclear weapons and protected with electronic countermeasures to prevent the Soviets from shooting them down.

When the U.S. President and cabinet become aware the attack is underway, they assist the Soviet government in intercepting the rogue U.S. Air Force bombers, to little effect, because the Soviets destroy only two bombers and damage one, the Alabama Angel, which remains airborne and en route to its target.

The U.S. government reestablishes the SAC airbase chain of command, but the general who launched the attack, the only man knowing the recall code, kills himself before capture and interrogation. His executive officer correctly deduces the recall code from among the general's desk pad doodles. The code is received by the surviving bomber aircraft, and they are successfully recalled, minutes before bombing their targets in the Soviet Union, save for the Alabama Angel, whose earlier-damaged radio prevents its recalling; it progresses to its target.

In a last effort to avert a Soviet–American nuclear war, the U.S. President offers the Soviet Premier the compensatory right to destroy Atlantic City, New Jersey; at the final moment, the Alabama Angel is shot down, and nuclear catastrophe is averted.

== Dr. Strangelove and Fail Safe ==
Red Alert author George collaborated on the Dr. Strangelove screenplay with Kubrick and satirist Terry Southern. Red Alert was more solemn than its film version and it did not include the character Dr. Strangelove, though the main plot and technical elements were quite similar. A novelisation of the actual film, rather than a reprint of the original novel, was published by George, based on an early draft in which aliens try to understand what happened after arriving at a wrecked Earth.

During the filming of Dr. Strangelove, Kubrick learned that Fail Safe, a film with a similar theme, was being produced. Although Fail Safe was to be a realistic thriller, Kubrick feared that its plot resemblance would damage his film's box office potential, especially if Fail Safe were released first. Indeed, the novel Fail-Safe (on which the film is based) is so similar to Red Alert that Kubrick and Peter George sued on charges of copyright infringement. The case was settled out of court. What worried Kubrick most was that Fail Safe boasted acclaimed director Sidney Lumet and first-rate dramatic actors Henry Fonda as the American President and Walter Matthau as the advisor to the Pentagon, Professor Groeteschele. Kubrick decided to throw a legal wrench into Fail Safe's production gears. Lumet recalled in the documentary Inside the Making of Dr. Strangelove: "We started casting. Fonda was already set.... which of course meant a big commitment in terms of money. I was set, Walter [Bernstein, the screenwriter] was set.... And suddenly, this lawsuit arrived, filed by Stanley Kubrick and Columbia Pictures."

Kubrick argued that Fail Safe's own 1962 source novel, Fail-Safe, had been copied from Red Alert, to which Kubrick owned creative rights. He pointed out unmistakable similarities in intentions between the characters Groeteschele and Strangelove (although there is not a Strangelove character in the novel). The plan worked, and the suit was settled out of court, with the agreement that Columbia Pictures, which had financed and was distributing Strangelove, also buy Fail Safe, which had been an independently financed production. Kubrick insisted that the studio release his movie first, and Fail Safe opened eight months behind Dr. Strangelove, to critical acclaim but mediocre ticket sales.

== Publication information ==
- George, Peter (1988) [c. 1963], Strangelove, or, How I learned to stop worrying and love the bomb, Oxford [Oxfordshire]; New York: Oxford University Press.
