= Simulmatics Corporation =

American former data science firm

- Founded: February 18, 1959; 67 years ago in New York City, USA
- Defunct: 1970
- Area served: United States
- Services: Data analytics

The Simulmatics Corporation was an American data analytics company that used computation to conduct large scale behavior analysis. The corporation was founded in 1959 by Ed Greenfield, an advertising agent on Madison Avenue, and ceased operation in 1970, after a series of bad publicity and financial troubles led to its ultimate collapse. The Simulmatics Corporation provided large scale political data analysis to clients, most notably in the 1960 election of John F. Kennedy, propaganda and psychological warfare in Vietnam, and as part of the Kerner Commission, an investigation into the causes of nationwide racial unrest in the summer of 1967.

Inspired by the growing use of computer simulation and prediction, particularly in the 1952 presidential election, the Simulmatics Corporation was founded on the premise of providing consulting services based on large scale social and behavioral data analysis using computer models. Their programs were run on IBM 704 computers and used the FORTRAN language. The word "simulmatics" is a combination of the words "simulation" and "automatic".

Notable employees and affiliates of the corporation include Ithiel de Sola Pool, and Alex Bernstein, a computer chess pioneer and attendee of the 1956 Dartmouth workshop.

== Notable projects ==
=== 1960 Presidential Election ===
The Simulmatics Corporation’s first significant contract was with the John F. Kennedy 1960 presidential campaign. The corporation conducted their analysis using “the People-Machine”, which was a program that modeled 480 different voter categories based on demographic information, such as “working class white protestant women in northern cities”. The program then predicted what these voter groups' responses would be to different stances taken by Kennedy. The corporation wanted to demonstrate to the campaign that making statements in support of civil rights would be beneficial to securing the presidency, which was reflected in their analysis.

Jill Lepore, an American historian, argues that most results generated by the People-Machine were "common sense". After Kennedy’s election the Simulmatics Corporation’s involvement in the campaign was publicized in an article in Harper’s Magazine, written by a Simulmatics’ employee disguised as a “freelance writer”, and became a nationwide sensation. Concerns that Kennedy had manipulated the election by working with the Simulmatics Corporation were widespread as people worried about the integrity and future of politics. Simulmatics took advantage of this publicity and went public in 1961. They worked on contracts in a wide variety of domains, from simulating automobile traffic to the effectiveness of advertising campaigns for prominent companies.

=== DARPA and Vietnam ===
In 1966, the Simulmatics Corporation was contracted by the Pentagon as part of DARPA. As part of pacification efforts, they were hired to win over the Southern Vietnamese to the American cause by first analyzing the population's sympathies and motivations. Simulmatics established an office in Saigon, and conducted research until 1968. As most of the Simulmatics employees did not speak Vietnamese, students from the University of Saigon were used to communicate with interview subjects to gather data.

The Simulmatics Corporation conducted several studies while in Saigon. Their first and most successful project was a study of the Vietnamese Regional Forces and Popular Forces (RF/PF). Researchers used Thematic Apperception Tests and the Cantril Scale in an attempt to identify a standard psyche of Vietnamese villagers, hoping that they could then develop propaganda campaigns and policy to increase Vietnamese sympathies for America. In a later study, Simulmatics researchers recruited a wide network of villagers in the Dihn Tuong and Chau Doc provinces. Villagers would send detailed reports back to the Simulmatics office on the sentiments of their neighbors and acquaintances, building a massive database for the corporation which they could use to gage civilian reactions to different American pacification efforts.

Reports from Simulmatics’ Saigon office frequently spoke of the organization's mismanagement. Because many of their original employees declined going to Vietnam, Simulmatics hired a new group of researchers, many of whom had fewer qualifications and were less well vetted than those initially working with the corporation. There were also significant challenges with cultural differences that researchers often seemed uninterested in addressing. As outsiders in rural Vietnamese communities, they struggled to build the trust to generate authentic and open responses from interviewees which compromised the integrity of their research.

In late 1967 as complaints piled up and the Saigon branch came under scrutiny, all of Simulmatics' ARPA projects were terminated and the corporation’s Saigon office was closed.

=== National Advisory Commission on Civil Disorders (Kerner Commission) ===
In the wake of the “Long, hot summer of 1967”, the Simulmatics Corporation was given a $221,000 contract by the National Advisory Commission on Civil Disorders (the Kerner Commission) to analyze media coverage of the riots and the public’s perception of the coverage. Simulmatics’ research consisted of both a content analysis of television and newspaper content and interviews gauging public sentiment investigating how the riots were portrayed in the media, how the public believed them to have been portrayed in the media, and how the public believed this portrayal to have affected the proliferation of the riots.

The content analysis was conducted in fifteen cities affected by the riots by dividing visual television content into discrete categories, entering the data into punch cards, and feeding it to a computer program. Categories included “riot actions” and “control and containment”, among others. This sorting was conducted manually by Simulmatics employees, and criterion for sorting was controversial (a clip of a burning building would only be categorized as a “riot action” if an individual was shown actually lighting the fire). The Simulmatics Corporation’s analysis yielded that media coverage was relatively calm and factual, with only 4.8% of content showing riots occurring while 75% of content showed aftermath. They also concluded that media coverage had not functioned to spread and proliferate rioting. Comparison of media coverage with trends of violence showed that coverage generally peaked the day after riots began and declined steadily in the following days, regardless of the levels of violence observed in later days.

The interviews were conducted across seven cities in primarily black neighborhoods using public spaces such as subways, hotel lobbies, and street corners. 567 black residents and 191 white residents were interviewed. Black interviewees tended to express that the media had exaggerated violence of the rioters while ignoring both excessive force from police and efforts by black residents to mitigate the violence while white interviewees generally expressed that they believed the media coverage was comprehensive and mostly fair.

Kerner commission members expressed some concern about the integrity of Simulmatics’ work, as they had neglected to include any radio content in their analysis which was a major source of information dissemination, especially in black communities. Additionally, television audio content was ignored which represented another gap in analysis, and the interviews conducted didn’t present much novel information. Alvin Spivak, the director of press relations for the commission, commented on Simulmatics’ involvement in an interview, saying, “I just felt they didn’t know what the hell they were doing”. Despite these tensions, however, the Kerner commission's published report relied heavily on Simulmatics' work in its chapter on media and closely mirrored its findings.

== In media ==
Eugene Burdick, an American political scientist and novelist, wrote The 480, which contains a fictional treatment of the Simulmatics Corporation's activities, under the name "Simulmatics Enterprise". Burdick had worked for sometime in the quantitative social sciences, where he was introduced to computer modeling of election data. He had also worked with Ed Greenfield on data analysis for the 1952 Adlai E. Stevenson II campaign. Later when founding Simulmatics, Greenfield to ask Burdick to join the corporation at its inception, but Burdick declined partially out of ethical concerns with their aims. While Burdick was writing, the Simulmatics Corporation supported his work on the novel, believing it would bring them more positive publicity, and granted him access to confidential files. The publication of The 480 in 1964, however, generated public concern about the role of computer simulation in politics, further harming the Simulmatics Corporations image.

In 1969, after a public debate at MIT about the Vietnam War with Ithiel de Sola Pool, Noam Chomsky published the “Menace of Liberal Scholarship” in the New York Review of Books, which denounced Pool and the Simulmatics Corporation for their complacency in the war. With growing support for the antiwar movement on campus, Pool became a center of protest as people criticized his contracts with the Department of Defense and Simulmatics’ work in Vietnam. Embroiled in controversy, Pool stepped down as the chairman of MIT’s political science department. Protests escalated to a point of violence, including molotov cocktails being thrown at Pool’s house and a bomb being placed in the political science building.

Professor of American History at Harvard University Jill Lepore wrote a book about the Simulmatics Corporation, titled If Then, in 2020, and recorded an audio version broadcast by BBC Radio 4 in 2021.

== See also ==
- Cambridge Analytica
