= The 480 =

Book by Eugene Burdick

- First edition cover with image of a punched card
- Author: Eugene Burdick
- Language: English
- Genre: Political fiction
- Publisher: McGraw Hill
- Publication date: 1964
- Publication place: United States
- Media type: Print (hardback & paperback)
- Pages: 313 pp (hardback)

The 480 is a political fiction novel by Eugene Burdick (1964).

The plot revolves around the political turmoil after the John F. Kennedy assassination in 1963. In the novel, a fictitious charismatic character, John Thatch, an engineer, is seeking the nomination for the Republican Party during the 1964 presidential elections. He is described as being contaminated with the "political virus". A handful of political professionals are promoting his nomination, in confrontation with the Party establishment. There exist apparent parallels between Thatch and Henry Cabot Lodge Jr., a write-in hero at the New Hampshire primary.

The novel criticizes the socio-political effects on society at large from the use of computers to run massive simulations, which predict the public reaction to certain (proposed) political moves before implementing them. Such simulations make it easy to manipulate the public consciousness.

The "480" in the title denotes the number of groups (by party affiliation, socioeconomic status, location, origin, etc.) that the computer simulation uses to classify the American electorate. The full list of these is reproduced in the Appendix, claimed by the author to be the true list used by the Simulmatics Corporation (real name) in Senator John F. Kennedy's Presidential campaign in 1960. The cover features an IBM 5081 punched card.

The Simulmatics Corporation was created by MIT Professor Ithiel de Sola Pool, who provided a non-fiction backup to The 480 in Candidates, Issues, and Strategies: A Computer Simulation of the 1960 Presidential Election, MIT Press, 1964 (with co-authors Robert P. Abelson and Samuel L. Popkin). They built their model from 130,000 archived interviews in Gallup and Roper polls over a ten-year period. Based on its output, they advised Kennedy that he would benefit from a strong civil rights stand and that he had nothing to lose, and much to gain, by attacking religious bigotry and dealing frankly with his Catholicism.

The 480 has been cited as prefiguring the effect of modern social media and data gathering on politics.
