= Fail Safe (1964 film) =

1964 film directed by Sidney Lumet

- Theatrical release poster
- Directed by: Sidney Lumet
- Screenplay by: Walter Bernstein
- Based on: Fail-Safe (1962 novel) by Eugene Burdick; Harvey Wheeler
- Produced by: Sidney Lumet; Charles H. Maguire; Max E. Youngstein
- Starring: Henry Fonda; Dan O'Herlihy; Walter Matthau; Frank Overton; Larry Hagman
- Cinematography: Gerald Hirschfeld
- Edited by: Ralph Rosenblum
- Production company: Columbia Pictures
- Distributed by: Columbia Pictures
- Release date: October 7, 1964
- Running time: 112 minutes
- Country: United States
- Language: English
- Box office: $1.8 million (rentals)

Fail Safe is a 1964 American Cold War political thriller film directed and produced by Sidney Lumet, adapted by Walter Bernstein from the 1962 novel by Eugene Burdick and Harvey Wheeler. It stars an ensemble cast, featuring Henry Fonda, Dan O'Herlihy, Walter Matthau, Frank Overton, Larry Hagman, Fritz Weaver, Dana Elcar, Dom DeLuise and Sorrell Booke.

The film follows a crisis caused by a critical error that sends a group of U.S. bombers to destroy Moscow, and the ensuing attempts to stop the bomber group before it can deploy a nuclear first strike.

The film was released by Columbia Pictures on October 7, 1964. It was a commercial disappointment, but was well-received by critics. In 2000, the novel was adapted again as a televised play, and broadcast live in black-and-white on CBS.

== Plot ==
United States Air Force Brigadier General Warren Black flies to Washington, D.C. to attend a Pentagon conference led by Dr. Groeteschele, a political advisor renowned for his expertise on nuclear strategy and fervent anti-communism. At a dinner party the previous evening, he dismissed the fears that a nuclear war between the U.S. and the Soviet Union would destroy the human race. To him, nuclear war, like any other, must have a victor and a vanquished, and the millions who might die in one are the price to be paid to end the threat of communism.

USAF early warning radar detects an unidentified aircraft over Hudson Bay, a potential circumpolar Soviet preemptive strike, prompting a scramble of USAF strategic nuclear bombers. After heightened tensions at Strategic Air Command—interceptions happen half a dozen times a month—the intruder is confirmed as an off-course civilian airliner. However, a computer short causes a single USAF bomber flight, Group 6, to receive apparently valid orders for a nuclear attack on Moscow. Colonel Jack Grady, its commander, obeys them, and six advanced "Vindicator" bombers take off over the Arctic toward Moscow. Attempts to rescind the order fail due to stringent U.S. safeguards against a fraudulent recall, compounded by a better than expected Soviet ability to jam U.S. radio communications.

The President of the United States personally attempts to have the bombers recalled, to no avail, then orders them shot down. While Groeteschele lobbies for a full-scale U.S. strike to opportunistically piggyback on the serendipity of an accidental attack, the military—including General Black, a college friend of the President—warns the President that "the Soviets will retaliate with everything they have, just as we would, and did after Pearl Harbor, if we compound things in any way". USAF fighter jets scramble to intercept Group 6, but are unable to catch up with the Mach II Vindicators before they run out of fuel and crash into the Arctic.

Communications are opened with the Soviet Premier. With U.S. help, the Soviets harmlessly trigger the Vindicators' defense missiles. The President struggles to find a solution that will avert a nuclear holocaust, and dispatches General Black on a secret mission to New York City. Meanwhile, the Soviets shoot down most of Group 6, but ignore SAC General Bogan's pleas to focus only on Grady's command aircraft, allowing it to evade their defenses.

Drawing on the Bible, the President proposes an "eye for an eye" to the Soviet Premier: sacrificing New York City to prevent a retaliatory attack. Wistfully, he inquires if the gesture alone is enough to spare millions of lives; the Premier responds by asking him what he would do if he were in his place. As Grady nears Moscow, the Soviets cease their jamming and American radio contact resumes. Grady's wife begs him to stop, but he ignores the pleas, fearing it is a Soviet ruse. To maximize bomb damage, he tells his crew they will go in low, even though they will die in the explosion; no-one resists.

Per his prearrangement with the Soviet Premier, the President remains in contact with the U.S. Ambassador to the Soviet Union until his telephone melts, confirming the worst. He then orders General Black to go through with his secret mission: destroying New York City. Despite Black's family and the First Lady being present in New York City at the time, Black obeys, dropping the atomic bomb before committing suicide by lethal injection.

As an evacuation of New York City was determined to only cause more harm than good, the residents are left completely oblivious to their fate. Glimpses of New Yorkers in everyday life are shown before the atomic bomb detonates, incinerating the city and its inhabitants.

== Cast ==
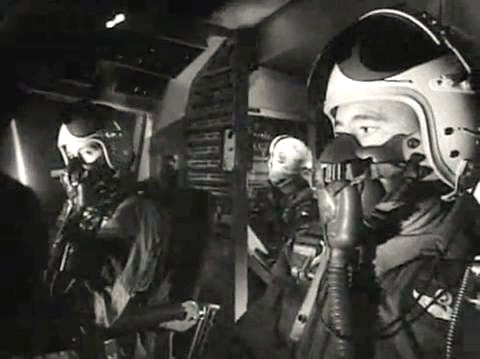
Edward Binns as Colonel Jack Grady (right)

- Dan O'Herlihy as Brigadier General Warren A. "Blackie" Black, USAF
- Walter Matthau as Professor Groeteschele
- Frank Overton as General Bogan, USAF
- Edward Binns as Colonel Jack Grady, USAF
- Fritz Weaver as Colonel Cascio, USAF
- Henry Fonda as the President of the United States
- Larry Hagman as Buck, the President's interpreter
- William Hansen as Defense Secretary Swenson
- Russell Hardie as General Stark
- Russell Collins as Gordon Knapp
- Sorrell Booke as Congressman Raskob
- Nancy Berg as Ilsa Woolfe
- John Connell as Thomas
- Frank Simpson as Sullivan
- Hildy Parks as Betty Black
- Janet Ward as Helen Grady
- Dom DeLuise as Master Sergeant Collins, USAF
- Dana Elcar as Mr. Foster
- Stewart Germain as Mr. Cascio
- Louise Larabee as Mrs. Cascio
- Frieda Altman as Mrs. Jennie Johnson
- Charles Tyner as Fighter Pilot (uncredited)

== Style ==
The film was shot in black and white, in a dramatic, theatrical style, with claustrophobic close-ups, sharp shadows and dramatic silences between several characters. Except for diegetic radio background during a scene at an Air Force base in Alaska, there is no original music score (only the electronic sound effects act as the film's main and end title music). With few exceptions, the action takes place largely in the Strategic Air Command war room, the Pentagon war conference room, the White House's underground bunker, and a single "Vindicator" bomber cockpit (in reality a flight simulator). Shots of normal daily life are seen only after the opening credits and in the final scene depicting an ordinary New York City day, its residents entirely unsuspecting of their imminent destruction, each vignette ending with a freeze-frame shot at the moment of impact.

== Production ==
Fail Safe so closely resembled Peter George's novel Red Alert, on which Stanley Kubrick's film Dr. Strangelove was based, that screenwriter/director Kubrick and George filed a copyright infringement lawsuit. The case was settled out of court, with Columbia Pictures (which had financed and was distributing Dr. Strangelove) buying and distributing the independently produced Fail Safe. Kubrick insisted that the studio release his movie first.

The character of Groeteschele was inspired, according to Lumet's audio commentary on the film, by Hudson Institute military strategist Herman Kahn.

The US Department of Defense and Air Force declined any cooperation with the production, because its premise involved a lack of control over nuclear strike forces. At the end of the film's credits, a scrolling, full-screen textual message appears, rendered in a bold all-capitals font. The message reads, "The producers of this film wish to stress that it is the stated position of the Department of Defense and the United States Air Force that a rigidly enforced system of safeguards and controls insure that occurrences such as those depicted in this story cannot happen".

Jazz musician Hal Schaefer wrote a score for the film. However, Sidney Lumet elected not to use it, instead having the film play without non-diegetic music (similar to 12 Angry Men). Snippets of the unused score can be heard in the film's trailer. Nonetheless, Columbia Records released a five-minute suite of Schaefer's score on vinyl record.

=== Filming ===
Because of the film's relatively low-budget (estimated at under $1.2 million), filming took place almost entirely in Lumet's hometown of New York City, with the key locations built as soundstage sets at Fox Movietone Studios on Tenth Avenue in Manhattan. The aircraft interiors were filmed aboard a modified training craft at LaGuardia Airport, where the exterior shots of Gen. Black boarding a plane to Washington D.C. were also filmed. Westbury, Long Island doubled for exterior shots of Washington D.C.. Cinematographer Gerald Hirschfeld was mainly known for shooting TV commercials.

The "Vindicator" bombers are represented in the film by stock footage of Convair B-58 Hustlers, which could fly at twice the speed of sound. Fighters sent to attack the bombers are illustrated by film clips variously of the McDonnell F-101 Voodoo, Convair F-102 Delta Dagger, and Lockheed F-104 Starfighter. Stock footage was used because the Air Force objected to presenting the U.S. nuclear strike force being thrown into deadly disarray by an equipment malfunction and declined to cooperate in the production. According to Lumet, permission to obtain stock footage was refused by both the military and by stock footage libraries, so the film ultimately used few aeroplane shots, and the planes seen in those shots are inconsistent. A nightmarish quality is achieved by showing numerous flying sequences in photographic negative, as if being illuminated by a brilliant nuclear flash. In several of the negative sequences, the "Soviet interceptors" are actually French-built Dassault Mirage III fighters with Israeli markings.

The large map in the SAC war room was front projected, while that of the Pentagon war room was rear projected. The maps and their text, plane icons, and other symbols were animated by John and Faith Hubley's company Storyboard, Inc.

== Reception ==
When Fail Safe opened in October 1964, it garnered excellent critical reviews, but its box-office performance was poor.

=== Critical response ===
Over the years, both the novel and the movie were well received for their depiction of a nuclear crisis, despite many critical reviews rejecting the notion that a breakdown in communication could result in the erroneous "Go" command depicted in the novel and the movie.

The film's reception with both critics and the public was compounded by the prior release of the Stanley Kubrick nuclear war satire Dr. Strangelove, which had appeared in January 1964, nine months ahead of Fail Safe's October release. Still, the film was later lauded as a Cold War thriller. The novel sold well for the remainder of the 20th century, and the film was given high marks for retaining the essence of the novel.

On review aggregator Rotten Tomatoes, the film holds a 93% approval rating based on 30 reviews. The website's critics consensus reads, "Fail-Safe strikes an impressive chord with its grim, high-minded exploration of the ultimate Doomsday scenario."

=== Accolades ===
The film was nominated at the 1966 BAFTA Awards in the United Nations Award category.

== See also ==
- The Bedford Incident, a 1965 film based on a novel about an engagement between an American destroyer and a Soviet submarine in the North Atlantic.
- By Dawn's Early Light, a 1990 TV film based on the novel Trinity's Child by William Prochnau, about an accidental nuclear attack on the US and the subsequent desperate attempts to avoid nuclear annihilation.
- A House of Dynamite, a 2025 American film.
- Dr. Strangelove, a 1964 political satire black comedy film loosely based on the thriller novel Red Alert (1958) by Peter George.
