= Commander-1 =

1965 novel by Peter Bryan George

- First edition (publ. Heinemann)
- Author: Peter Bryan George
- Language: English
- Publication date: 1965

Commander-1 is a 1965 novel by Welsh author Peter Bryan George and deals with the aftermath of a nuclear war between the United States, the Soviet Union and the People's Republic of China. It was George's last published work, with the author committing suicide in 1966.

== Plot ==
An up-and-coming Chinese Communist apparatchik named Li (who is, in fact, a suave Fu Manchu type philosopher steeped in ancient Chinese learning and having only a thin veneer of Communism or Marxism) devises a plan with the aid of a prominent nuclear scientist and a People's Liberation Army general to produce a nuclear weapon, which they will plant outside US bases of strategic importance and detonate so that it appears that the Soviet Union has committed to the first strike of a nuclear war. The United States and the Soviet Union both deploy their nuclear arsenals, wiping each other out and destroying the Pentagon and killing the US President.

Meanwhile, the only submarine left in the US fleet, which has been on an expedition conducting an experiment on social isolation under the polar icecap, comes back to port after receiving news of the nuclear holocaust. The commander drops the survivors off at a deserted Pacific island that will be passed over by the fallout. The survivors soon discover that the island is really a massive bunker for just such an eventuality. Two of the survivors kill themselves after they conceive a child, which they believe to be mutated because of the presence of the mutated baby produced by one of the island's local apes.

The submarine then heads to a surviving US naval base, where they find the military holding out against civilian survivors led by an ex-congressman. The submarine commander, James Geragty, turns the civilians into mindless drones, using drugs from the medical supplies at the base, and takes them on board his submarine to the Pacific island, the only place in the world not affected by fallout. There Geragty sets himself up as the new US President, Commander One, and sets his slaves to work building his new paradise, which the original experiment subjects reject as totalitarian.

After he declares that he will attempt to destroy any Soviet survivors that he may eventually find, he sets the original experiment candidates loose on a rubber dinghy, claiming that he will let them go to another island. As they float away in the ocean, Geragty has them machine-gunned in the water, destroying all dissent in his new society.

In an interlude set in China, it is disclosed how badly Comrade Li's miscalculated in his nefarious plan. While the Americans and Soviets did destroy each other, that did not leave China free to claim the world; rather, both Americans and Soviets reserved some of their missiles for China, enough to completely destroy it. Comrade Li meets a suitable gruesome and ignominious end at the vengeful hands of a band of surviving Chinese soldiers.
