= Peter George (author) =

Welsh author and former air officer (1924–1966)

Peter George

Peter Bryan George (26 March 1924 – 1 June 1966) was a Welsh author, most famous for the 1958 Cold War thriller novel Red Alert, published initially with the title Two Hours to Doom and written using the pseudonym Peter Bryant. The book was the inspiration for Stanley Kubrick's film Dr. Strangelove or: How I Learned to Stop Worrying and Love the Bomb.

== Life ==
George was born in 1924 in Treorchy, Rhondda, Wales, and died aged 42 in Hastings, East Sussex, England. He was a flight lieutenant and navigator for the Royal Air Force during World War II serving with No. 255 Squadron RAF, flying night fighter missions over Malta and Italy. He rejoined the RAF serving at RAF Neatishead and as a fighter controller where he often wrote while on duty and used a pseudonym. He retired from the service in 1961.

On 1 June 1966, Peter George was found dead with a discharged double-barrelled shotgun between his knees; his death was ruled a suicide. Brian Aldiss reported that George suffered from depression and was an alcoholic. He left behind a wife and three children.

== Works ==
His best-known novel, Red Alert was written while he was a serving RAF officer (hence the original use of a pseudonym: Peter Bryant – the Bryan being from his middle name). Drawn from personal experience, Red Alert was the inspiration for Stanley Kubrick's classic film Dr. Strangelove or: How I Learned to Stop Worrying and Love the Bomb. Interest in nuclear weapon themes, sparked by Stanley Kramer's film version of the novel On the Beach in 1959, caused the movie rights to Red Alert to be sold that year, only to be transferred until Stanley Kubrick bought them in 1962, reportedly for as little as $3,500.

Another bestselling novel published in 1962, Fail Safe, was so similar to George's nuclear war theme that both he and Kubrick sued on a charge of copyright infringement, settling out of court. Ironically the same movie studio, Columbia Pictures, which had financed and was distributing Strangelove, also bought Fail Safe, which had been an independently financed production. Since Kubrick insisted that the studio release his movie first in January 1964, the perceived commonality led to Fail Safe opening in October later that year to poor box office performance, despite excellent reviews for its more serious depiction of a nuclear crisis than Kubrick's overtly satirical approach.

While Peter George received a co-writing credit for Strangelove's screenplay with Kubrick and Terry Southern, it is unclear how much involvement he actually had, and he was reportedly dissatisfied with the comedic element Kubrick applied to the material. As a co-writer, he shared a "Best Adapted Screenplay" Oscar nomination. After the movie was released, he wrote a novelisation of Dr. Strangelove and dedicated it to Kubrick. It was out of print for many years but was to be re-issued in 2015 by Candy Jar Ltd and features previously unpublished material concerning Strangelove's early career, with a foreword by George's son, David.

George's final completed novel before his suicide, Commander-1, envisaged a post-apocalyptic world in which a group of survivors is tyrannized by a dictator.

== Novels ==
- Come Blonde, Came Murder (T. V. Boardman, 1952) as "Peter George".
- Pattern of Death (T. V. Boardman, 1954) as "Peter George".
- Cool Murder (T. V. Boardman, 1958) as "Peter George"; later reissued in paperback (Mayflower, 1965) as "Bryan Peters".
- Two Hours To Doom (T. V. Boardman, 1958) as "Peter Bryant" - later published as Red Alert (Ace, 1958)
- Hong Kong Kill (T. V. Boardman, 1958) as "Bryan Peters".
- The Big H (T. V. Boardman, 1961) as "Bryan Peters".
- The Final Steal (T. V. Boardman, 1962) as "Peter George".
- Dr. Strangelove or: How I Learned to Stop Worrying and Love the Bomb (Corgi, 1963) as "Peter George"; novelisation of the screenplay; dedicated to Stanley Kubrick.
- Commander-1 (Heinemann, 1965) as "Peter George".
