= Fail Safe (2000 film) =

2000 American television thriller film directed by Stephen Frears

- DVD Cover
- Based on: Fail-Safe by Eugene Burdick; Harvey Wheeler
- Screenplay by: Walter Bernstein
- Directed by: Stephen Frears; Martin Pasetta
- Starring: Hank Azaria; Don Cheadle; George Clooney; James Cromwell; Brian Dennehy; John Diehl; Sam Elliott; Richard Dreyfuss; Harvey Keitel; Norman Lloyd; Bill Smitrovich; Noah Wyle
- Country of origin: United States
- Original language: English

Production
- Producer: Tom Park
- Cinematography: John A. Alonzo
- Editor: Anne V. Coates
- Running time: 86 minutes
- Production companies: Maysville Pictures; Warner Bros. Television

Original release
- Network: CBS
- Release: April 9, 2000

Fail Safe is a 2000 televised broadcast play, directed by Stephen Frears and based on Fail-Safe, the Cold War novel by Eugene Burdick and Harvey Wheeler. The play, broadcast live in black and white on CBS, starred George Clooney, Richard Dreyfuss, Harvey Keitel, and Noah Wyle, and was one of the few live dramas on American television since its Golden Age in the 1950s and 1960s. The broadcast was introduced by Walter Cronkite; his introduction, also broadcast in black and white, is included in the DVD releases of the film.

The novel was first adapted into a 1964 film of the same name directed by Sidney Lumet; the TV version is shorter than the 1964 film due to commercial airtime and omits a number of subplots.

== Plot ==
In the early 1960s, at the height of the Cold War between the United States and the Soviet Union, an unknown aircraft approaches North America from Europe. U.S. Vindicator bombers of the Strategic Air Command (SAC) are scrambled to their fail safe points near the Russian Far East. The bombers have orders not to proceed past their fail safe points without receiving a special attack code. The original threat is proven to be innocuous and recall orders are issued. However, a technical failure causes the attack code CAP811 to be transmitted to Group Six, which consists of six Vindicator supersonic bombers and four escort fighters. Colonel Grady, the commanding pilot of Group Six, tries to contact SAC headquarters in Omaha to verify the fail-safe order (called "Positive Check"), but Soviet radio jamming prevents Grady from hearing Omaha. Concluding that the attack order and the radio jamming could only mean war, Grady commands Group Six towards Moscow, their intended destination.

At meetings in Omaha, the Pentagon, and in the fallout shelter of the White House, U.S. politicians and scholars debate the implications of the attack. Professor Groteschele suggests the United States follow this accidental attack with a full-scale attack to force the Soviets to surrender.

The U.S. president orders the Air Force to send the four escort fighters after the bombers to shoot down the Vindicators. The attempt is to show that the Vindicator attack is an accident, not a full-scale nuclear assault. After using their afterburners in an attempt to catch the bombers, the fighters run out of fuel and crash, dooming the pilots to die of exposure in the Arctic Ocean. The fighters fail to destroy any bombers.

The U.S. president then contacts the Premier of the Soviet Union and offers assistance in attacking the group. The Soviets decline at first; later, they decide to accept the Americans' help.

Meanwhile, the Soviet PVO Strany air defence corps has managed to shoot down two of the six planes. After accepting American help they shoot down two more, but the final two bombers remain on course for Moscow. One is a decoy and carries no bombs, whilst the other carries two 20 megaton devices. General Bogan tells Marshal Nevsky, the Soviet air defence commander, to ignore the decoy plane because it is harmless. Nevsky, who mistrusts Bogan, instead orders his Soviet aircraft to pursue the decoy aircraft. The Soviet fighters are then out of position to intercept the final U.S. bomber, enabling it to attack successfully.

As the bomber approaches Moscow, Colonel Grady opens up the radio to contact SAC to inform them that they are about to make the strike. As a last-minute measure, the Soviets fire a barrage of nuclear-tipped missiles to form a fireball in an attempt to knock the low-flying Vindicator out of the sky. The bomber fires two decoy missiles, which successfully lead the Soviet missiles high in the air and Colonel Grady's plane survives.

With the radio open, the President attempts to persuade Grady that there is no war, using Grady's son to try and convince him. Acting under the assumption that orders for such a late recall attempt must be a Soviet trick, Grady ignores them. Grady tells his crew that "We're not just walking wounded, we're walking dead men," because of radiation from the Soviet missiles. He intends to fly the aircraft over Moscow and detonate the bombs in the plane. His co-pilot notes, "There's nothing to go home to." Meanwhile, the American president has ordered another American bomber to circle over New York with a 40-megaton payload, which should be dropped in case of the bombing of Moscow. The American ambassador in Moscow reports about the final moments of the Soviet capital before being vaporized from the blast.

The American bomber receives an order to drop its bombs over New York in order for the destruction of Moscow to be reciprocated and a Third World War avoided. It was earlier revealed that the U.S. President's wife was in New York while the events of the film transpired, meaning she would be killed in the blast. The pilot of the American bomber, General Black, commits suicide with a lethal injection just after releasing the bombs.

New Yorkers are shown going about their lives, unaware of their imminent doom. The screen fades to white and text appears listing the nine countries with nuclear capability as of the year 2000.

== Cast ==
- Walter Cronkite as Host
- Richard Dreyfuss as The President
- Noah Wyle as Buck
- Brian Dennehy as General Bogan
- Sam Elliott as Congressman Raskob
- James Cromwell as Gordon Knapp
- John Diehl as Colonel Cascio (Diehl was a last-minute replacement for Miguel Ferrer, who had to drop out due to another professional commitment.
- Hank Azaria as Professor Groeteschele (loosely based on John von Neumann and Herman Kahn)
- Norman Lloyd as Defense Secretary Swenson
- Bill Smitrovich as General Stark
- Don Cheadle as 1st Lieutenant Jimmy Pierce
- George Clooney as Colonel Jack Grady
- Harvey Keitel as Brigadier General Warren A. Black
- Doris Belack as Mrs. Jennie Johnson
- Tommy Hinkley as Sergeant Collins
- Thom Mathews as Billy Flynn
- Cynthia Ettinger as Betty Black
- Will Rothhaar as Tom Grady (Colonel Grady's son, serving the same role in the plot as Grady's wife in the 1964 film.)

== Production ==
The April 9, 2000 presentation was the first live broadcast of a dramatic movie (a televised play) on CBS since May 1960. The production was shot and aired in black and white (the same format as the 1964 theatrical film), using 22 cameras on multiple sets.

== See also ==
- List of nuclear holocaust fiction
- Nuclear weapons and the United States
- Nuclear weapons in popular culture
