= Dr. Strangelove =

1964 film directed by Stanley Kubrick

Dr. Strangelove or: How I Learned to Stop Worrying and Love the Bomb
- Theatrical release poster by Tomi Ungerer
- Directed by: Stanley Kubrick
- Screenplay by: Stanley Kubrick; Terry Southern; Peter George
- Based on: Red Alert by Peter George
- Produced by: Stanley Kubrick
- Starring: Peter Sellers; George C. Scott; Sterling Hayden; Keenan Wynn; Slim Pickens; Tracy Reed
- Cinematography: Gilbert Taylor
- Edited by: Anthony Harvey
- Music by: Laurie Johnson
- Production companies: Columbia Pictures Corporation; Hawk Films; Polaris Productions
- Distributed by: Columbia Pictures Corporation
- Release date: January 29, 1964
- Running time: 94 minutes
- Countries: United Kingdom; United States
- Language: English
- Budget: $1.8 million
- Box office: $9.7 million

Dr. Strangelove or: How I Learned to Stop Worrying and Love the Bomb (usually shortened to Dr. Strangelove) is a 1964 political satire black comedy film co-written, produced, and directed by Stanley Kubrick. It is loosely based on the thriller novel Red Alert (1958) by Peter George, who wrote the screenplay with Kubrick and Terry Southern. Financed and released by Columbia Pictures, the film was a co-production between the United States and the United Kingdom.

Dr. Strangelove parodies the heightened fears during the Cold War of a nuclear war between the United States and the Soviet Union and stars Peter Sellers (portraying three different characters), George C. Scott, Sterling Hayden, Keenan Wynn, Slim Pickens, and Tracy Reed. The story begins when a paranoid United States Air Force brigadier general goes rogue and orders an unprovoked pre-emptive attack on the Soviet Union using all his B-52s. The President of the United States, his scientific advisor Dr. Strangelove, a Royal Air Force exchange officer, and the Chairman of the Joint Chiefs of Staff luckily recall the B-52s; unfortunately, an isolated and crippled B-52 still bombs the Soviet Union, triggering their new doomsday device.

The film is widely considered one of the best comedy films and one of the greatest and most influential films ever made. In 1998, the American Film Institute ranked it 26th in its list of the best American films (in the 2007 edition, the film ranked 39th), and in 2000, it was listed as number three on its list of the funniest American films. In 1989, the United States Library of Congress included Dr. Strangelove as one of the first 25 films selected for preservation in the National Film Registry for being "culturally, historically, or aesthetically significant". The film received four Academy Award nominations, including Best Picture, Best Director, Best Adapted Screenplay, and Best Actor for Sellers. The film was also nominated for seven BAFTA Film Awards, winning Best Film From Any Source, Best British Film, and Best Art Direction (Black and White), and it also won the Hugo Award for Best Dramatic Presentation.

== Plot ==
United States Air Force Brigadier General Jack D. Ripper, the commander of Burpelson Air Force Base, orders his executive officer, Group Captain Lionel Mandrake (an exchange officer from the Royal Air Force), to put the base on alert (condition red, the most intense lockdown status), confiscate all privately owned radios from base personnel and issue "Wing Attack Plan R" to the planes of the 843rd Bomb Wing. At the time of issuance of said order, the planes, flying B-52 bombers armed with thermonuclear bombs, are on airborne alert two hours from their targets inside the Soviet Union.

The aircraft commence attack flights on the USSR and set their radios to allow communications only through their CRM 114 discriminators, which are designed to accept only communications preceded by a secret three-letter code known only to General Ripper. Happening upon a radio that had been missed earlier and hearing regular civilian broadcasting, Mandrake realizes that no attack order has been issued by the Pentagon and tries to stop Ripper, who locks them both in his office. Ripper tells Mandrake that he believes the Soviets have been fluoridating American water supplies to pollute the "precious bodily fluids" of Americans. Mandrake realizes Ripper has gone completely mad.

The film's trailer

In the War Room at the Pentagon, General Buck Turgidson briefs President Merkin Muffley and other officers about how "Plan R" enables a senior officer to launch a retaliatory nuclear attack on the Soviets if all of his superior officers have been killed in a first strike on the United States. Trying every CRM code combination to issue a recall order would require two days, so Muffley orders the U.S. Army to storm the base and arrest General Ripper. Turgidson, noting the slim odds of recalling the planes in time, then proposes that Muffley not only let the attack proceed but send reinforcements. Muffley rejects Turgidson's recommendation and instead brings Soviet ambassador Alexei de Sadeski into the War Room to telephone Soviet Premier Dimitri Kissov. Muffley warns the premier of the impending attack and offers to reveal the targets, flight plans, and defensive systems of the bombers so that the Soviets can protect themselves.

After a heated discussion with a drunken Kissov, the ambassador informs President Muffley that the Soviet Union created a doomsday machine as a nuclear deterrent; it consists of many buried cobalt bombs, which are set to detonate automatically should any nuclear attack strike the country. The resulting nuclear fallout would render the Earth's surface uninhabitable for 93 years. The device cannot be deactivated, as it is programmed to explode if any such attempt is made. The president's German scientific adviser, the paraplegic former Nazi Dr. Strangelove, points out that such a doomsday machine would only have been an effective deterrent if everyone knew about it; de Sadeski replies that Kissov had planned to reveal its existence to the world the following week at the Party Congress.

When the U.S. Army troops gain control of Burpelson, General Ripper fatally shoots himself. Mandrake infers the CRM code from doodles on Ripper's desk blotter and relays it to the Pentagon. Using the code, Strategic Air Command successfully recalls all of the bombers except for one, commanded by Major T. J. "King" Kong. Because its radio equipment was damaged by a Soviet SAM, it is unable to receive or send communications. Major Kong flies below radar and switches targets, thus preventing Soviet air radar from detecting and intercepting their plane. Because the Soviet missile also damaged the bomb bay doors, Kong enters the bay and repairs the electrical wiring. When he is successful, the bomb drops with him straddling it. Kong joyously hoots and waves his cowboy hat as he rides the falling bomb to his death.

In the War Room, Dr. Strangelove recommends that the President gather several hundred thousand people to live in deep underground mines where the radiation will not penetrate. Worried that the Soviets will do the same, Turgidson warns about a "mineshaft gap" (spoofing the term "missile gap") while de Sadeski secretly photographs the War Room. Dr. Strangelove prepares to announce his plan when he suddenly stands up out of his wheelchair and exclaims, "Mein Führer, I can walk!" The movie ends with a montage of explosions set to "We'll Meet Again" signifying the activation of the doomsday device.

== Cast ==
- Peter Sellers as:
  - Group Captain Lionel Mandrake, a British RAF exchange officer
  - Merkin Muffley, the President of the United States
  - Dr. Strangelove (né Merkwürdigliebe), the wheelchair-using nuclear war expert and former Nazi, who has alien hand syndrome
- George C. Scott as General Buck Turgidson, Chairman of the Joint Chiefs of Staff
- Sterling Hayden as Brigadier General Jack D. Ripper, paranoid commander of Burpelson Air Force Base, which is part of the Strategic Air Command.
- Keenan Wynn as Colonel "Bat" Guano, the Army officer who finds Mandrake and Ripper
- Jack Creley as Mr. Staines, National Security Adviser
- Slim Pickens as Major T. J. "King" Kong, the B-52 bomber's commander and pilot
- Peter Bull as Soviet Ambassador Alexei de Sadeski
- James Earl Jones as First Lieutenant Lothar Zogg, the B-52's bombardier (film debut)
- Tracy Reed as Miss Scott, General Turgidson's secretary and mistress, the film's only female character. She also appears as "Miss Foreign Affairs", the Playboy Playmate in Playboy's June 1962 issue, which Major Kong is shown perusing at one point.
- Shane Rimmer as Capt. Ace Owens, the co-pilot of the B-52

=== Peter Sellers's roles ===
Peter Sellers plays three roles:

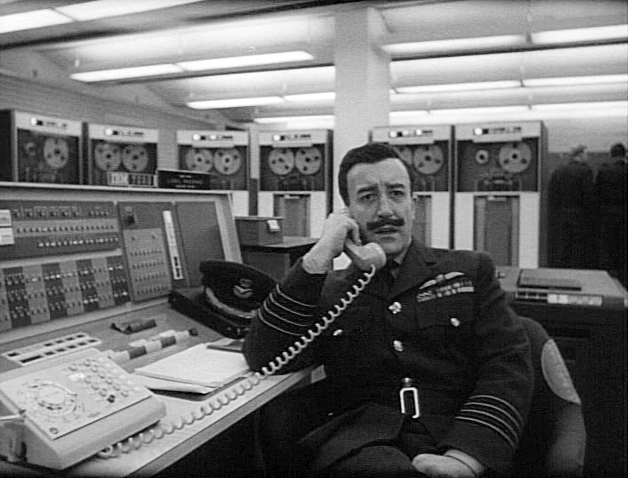
Group Captain Mandrake

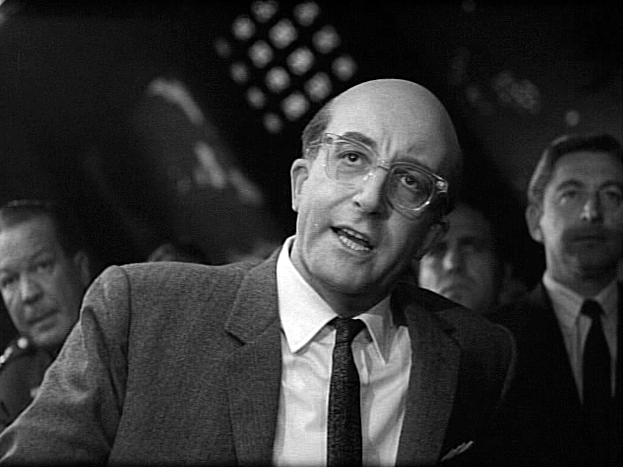
President Muffley

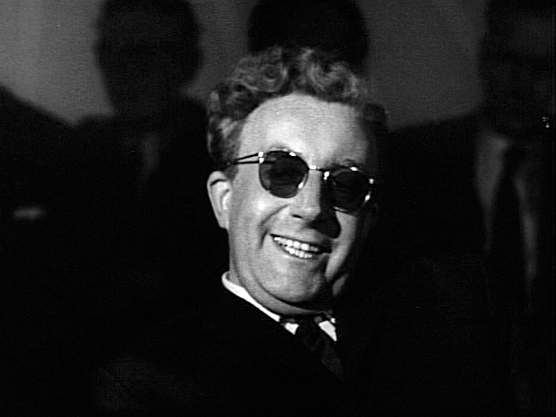
Dr. Strangelove

Columbia Pictures agreed to finance the film if Peter Sellers played at least four major roles. The condition stemmed from the studio's opinion that much of the success of Kubrick's previous film Lolita (1962) was based on Sellers's performance, in which his single character assumes several identities. Sellers also played three roles in The Mouse That Roared (1959). Kubrick accepted the demand, later saying that "such crass and grotesque stipulations are the sine qua non of the motion-picture business."

Sellers had been expected to play Air Force Major T. J. "King" Kong, the B-52 aircraft commander, but was reluctant; he felt his workload was too heavy and worried he would not properly portray the character's Texan accent. Kubrick pleaded with him, and he asked the screenwriter Terry Southern (who had been raised in Texas) to record a tape with Kong's lines spoken in his accent; Sellers then practiced using Southern's tapes. After the start of shooting in the aircraft, Sellers sprained his ankle and could no longer work in the cramped aircraft mockup.

Sellers improvised much of his dialogue, with Kubrick incorporating the ad-libs into the written screenplay, a practice known as retroscripting.

==== Group Captain Lionel Mandrake ====
According to film critic Alexander Walker, the author of biographies of both Sellers and Kubrick, the role of Group Captain Lionel Mandrake was the easiest of the three for Sellers to play, since he was aided by his experience of mimicking his superiors while serving in the RAF during World War II. There is also a heavy resemblance to Sellers's friend and occasional co-star Terry-Thomas and the prosthetic-limbed RAF flying ace Sir Douglas Bader.

==== President Merkin Muffley ====
For his performance as President Merkin Muffley, Sellers assumed a Midwestern American English accent. Sellers drew inspiration for the role from Adlai Stevenson, a former Illinois governor who was the Democratic candidate for the 1952 and 1956 presidential elections and the U.N. ambassador during the Cuban Missile Crisis.

In early takes, Sellers simulated cold symptoms to emphasize the character's apparent weakness. That caused frequent laughter among the film crew, ruining several takes. Kubrick ultimately found this comic portrayal inappropriate, feeling Muffley should be a serious character. In later takes, Sellers played the role straight, though the President's cold is still evident in several scenes.

==== Dr. Strangelove ====
Dr. Strangelove is a scientist and former Nazi, evoking Operation Paperclip, the US effort to recruit top German technical talent at the end of World War II. He serves as President Muffley's scientific adviser in the War Room. When General Turgidson wonders aloud to Mr. Staines (Jack Creley), what kind of name "Strangelove" is, as it does not sound like a "Kraut name", Staines responds that Strangelove's original German surname was Merkwürdigliebe ("strange love" in German) and that "he changed it when he became a citizen". Strangelove accidentally addresses the president as Mein Führer twice in the film. Dr. Strangelove did not appear in the book Red Alert.

The character is an amalgamation of the Hungarian mathematician John Von Neumann, RAND Corporation strategist Herman Kahn, rocket scientist Wernher von Braun (a central figure in Nazi Germany's rocket development program recruited to the US after the war), and Edward Teller, the "father of the hydrogen bomb". Rumors claimed the character was based on Henry Kissinger, but Kubrick and Sellers denied this; Sellers said: "Strangelove was never modeled after Kissinger—that's a popular misconception. It was always Wernher von Braun." Furthermore, Henry Kissinger points out in his memoirs that at the time of the writing of Dr. Strangelove, he was a little-known academic.

The wheelchair-using Strangelove furthers a Kubrick trope of the menacing, seated antagonist, first depicted in Lolita through the character Dr. Zaempf. Strangelove's accent was influenced by that of Austrian-American photographer Weegee, who worked for Kubrick as a special photographic effects consultant. Strangelove's appearance echoes the mad scientist archetype as seen in the character Rotwang in Fritz Lang's film Metropolis (1927). Sellers's Strangelove takes from Rotwang the single black gloved hand (which, in Rotwang's case, is mechanical because of a lab accident), the wild hair, and, most importantly, his ability to avoid being controlled by political power. According to Alexander Walker, Sellers improvised Dr. Strangelove's lapse into the Nazi salute, borrowing one of Kubrick's black leather gloves for the uncontrollable hand that makes the gesture. Dr. Strangelove apparently has alien hand syndrome. Kubrick wore the gloves on the set to avoid being burned when handling hot lights, and Sellers, recognizing the potential connection to Lang's work, found them to be menacing.

=== George C. Scott as General Buck Turgidson ===
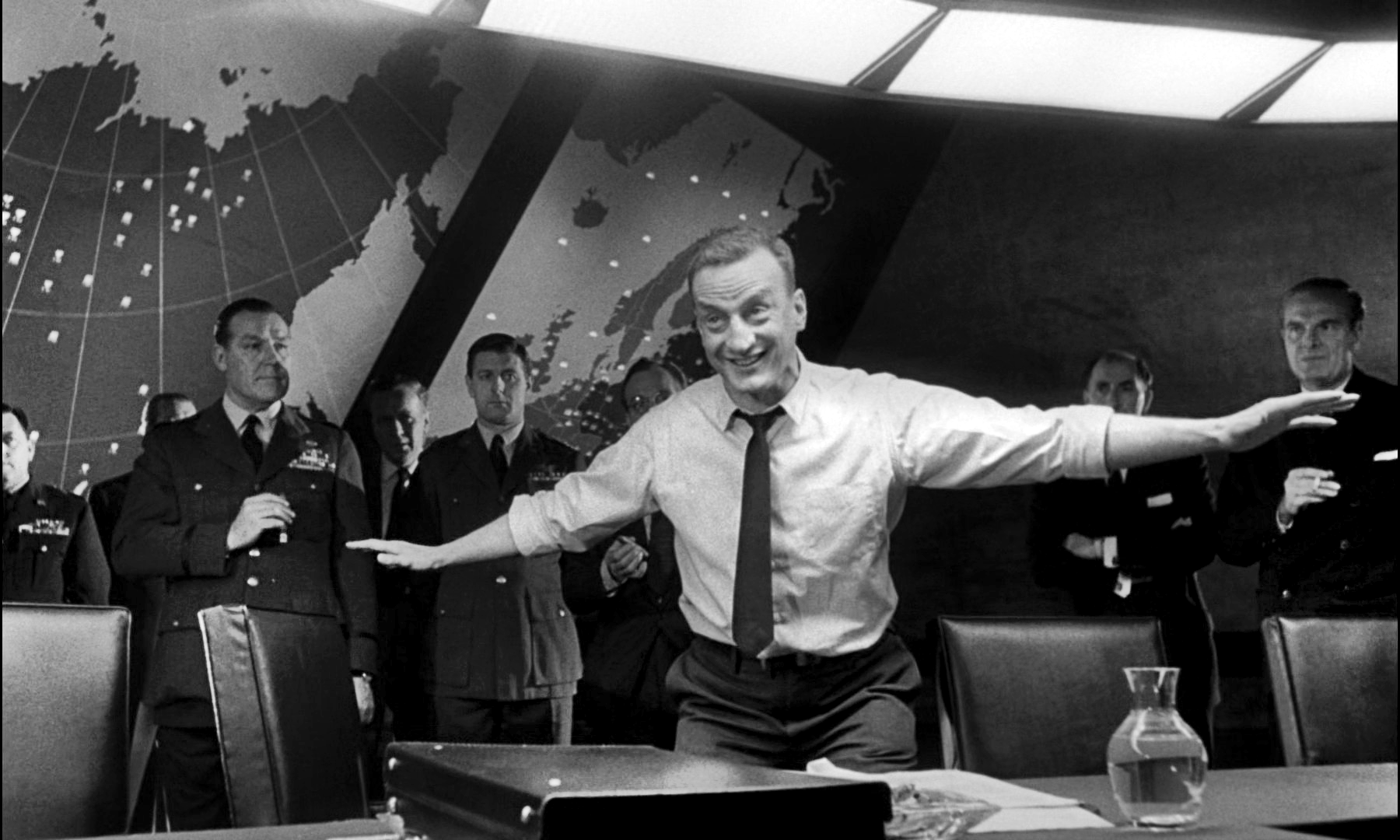
General Buck Turgidson imitating a low-flying B-52 "frying chickens in a barnyard"

George C. Scott played the role of General Buck Turgidson, the Chairman of the Joint Chiefs of Staff. In this capacity General Turgidson was the nation's highest-ranking military officer and the principal military adviser to the president and the National Security Council. He is seen during most of the movie advising President Muffley on the best steps to take in order to stop the fleet of B-52 Stratofortresses that was deployed by Brigadier General Jack D. Ripper to drop nuclear bombs on Soviet soil.

According to James Earl Jones, Kubrick tricked Scott into playing the role of Gen. Turgidson in a much more outlandish manner than Scott was comfortable doing. Kubrick talked Scott into doing absurd "practice" takes, which Kubrick told Scott would never be used, as a way to warm up for the "real" takes. Kubrick used many of these "practice" takes in the final film, rather than the more restrained ones, allegedly causing Scott to swear never to work with Kubrick again.

During the filming, Kubrick and Scott had different opinions regarding certain scenes, but Kubrick obtained Scott's compliance largely by beating him at chess, which they played frequently on the set.

=== Slim Pickens as Major T. J. "King" Kong ===
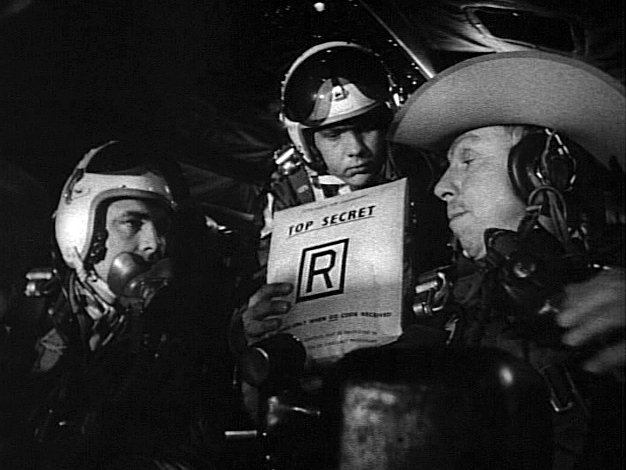
Wing Attack Plan R, fresh from the cockpit's safe, allows a nuclear strike without the President's authorization.

Slim Pickens, an established character actor and veteran of many Western films, was eventually chosen to replace Sellers as Major Kong after Sellers' injury. John Wayne was offered the role after Sellers was injured, but he never responded to Kubrick's offer. Dan Blocker of the Bonanza western television series was also approached to play the part, but according to Southern, Blocker's agent rejected the script as being "too pinko". Kubrick then recruited Pickens, whom he knew from his brief involvement in a Marlon Brando western film project that was eventually filmed as One-Eyed Jacks.

His fellow actor James Earl Jones recalls, "He was Major Kong on and off the set—he didn't change a thing—his temperament, his language, his behavior." Pickens was not told that the movie was a black comedy, and he was only given the script for scenes he was in to get him to play it "straight".

Kubrick's biographer John Baxter explained, in the documentary Inside the Making of Dr. Strangelove:

As it turns out, Slim Pickens had never left the United States. He had to hurry and get his first passport. He arrived on the set, and somebody said, "Gosh, he's arrived in costume!", not realizing that that's how he always dressed ... with the cowboy hat and the fringed jacket and the cowboy boots—and that he wasn't putting on the character—that's the way he talked.

Pickens, who had previously played only supporting character roles, said that his appearance as Major Kong greatly improved his career. He later commented, "After Dr. Strangelove, my salary jumped five times, and assistant directors started saying 'Hey, Slim' instead of 'Hey, you'."

== Production ==
=== Novel and screenplay ===
Stanley Kubrick started with nothing but a vague idea to make a thriller about a nuclear accident that built on the widespread Cold War fear for survival. While doing research, Kubrick gradually became aware of the subtle and paradoxical "balance of terror" between nuclear powers. At Kubrick's request, Alastair Buchan (the head of the Institute for Strategic Studies) recommended the thriller novel Red Alert by Peter George. Kubrick was impressed with the book, which had also been praised by game theorist and future Nobel Prize in Economics winner Thomas Schelling in an article written for the Bulletin of the Atomic Scientists and reprinted in The Observer, and immediately bought the film rights. In 2006, Schelling wrote that conversations between Kubrick, Schelling, and George in late 1960 about a treatment of Red Alert updated with intercontinental missiles eventually led to the making of the film.

In collaboration with George, Kubrick started writing a screenplay based on the book. While writing the screenplay, they benefited from some brief consultations with Schelling and later, Herman Kahn. In following the tone of the book, Kubrick originally intended to film the story as a serious drama. However, he began to see comedy inherent in the idea of mutual assured destruction as he wrote the first draft. He later said:

My idea of doing it as a nightmare comedy came in the early weeks of working on the screenplay. I found that in trying to put meat on the bones and to imagine the scenes fully, one had to keep leaving out of it things which were either absurd or paradoxical, in order to keep it from being funny; and these things seemed to be close to the heart of the scenes in question.

The title of the film satirically references Dale Carnegie's How to Stop Worrying and Start Living. Among the other titles that Kubrick initially considered were Dr. Doomsday or: How to Start World War III Without Even Trying, Dr. Strangelove's Secret Uses of Uranus, and Wonderful Bomb. After deciding to make the film a black comedy, Kubrick brought in Terry Southern as a co-writer in late 1962. The choice was influenced by reading Southern's comic novel The Magic Christian, which Kubrick had received as a gift from Peter Sellers, and which itself became a Sellers film in 1969. Southern made important contributions to the film, but his role led to a rift between Kubrick and Peter George; after Life magazine published a photo-essay on Southern in August 1964 which implied that Southern had been the script's principal author—a misperception neither Kubrick nor Southern did much to dispel— George wrote a letter to the magazine, published in its September 1964 issue, in which he pointed out that he had both written the film's source novel and collaborated on various incarnations of the script over a period of ten months, whereas "Southern was briefly employed ... to do some additional rewriting for Kubrick and myself and fittingly received a screenplay credit in third place behind Mr. Kubrick and myself."

=== Sets and filming ===
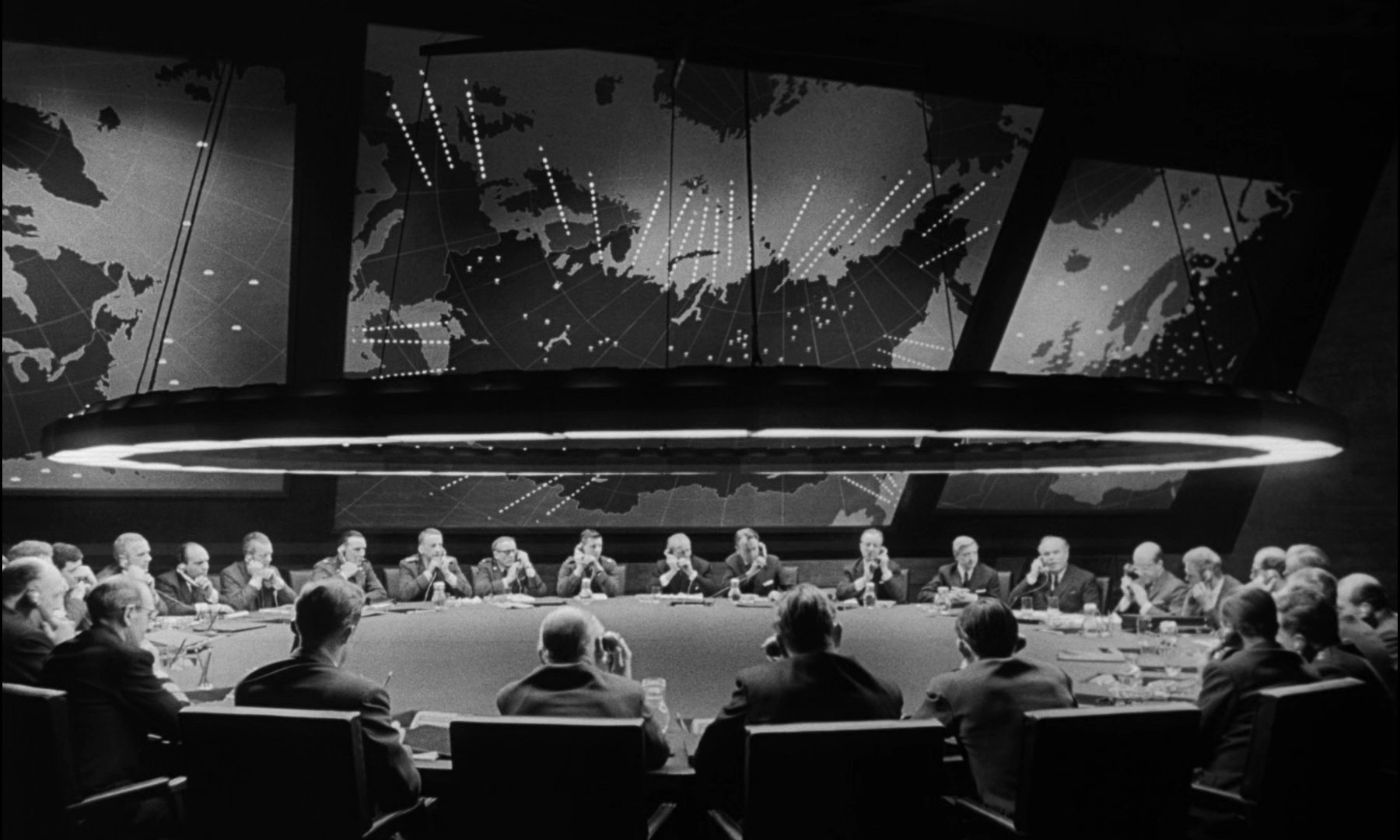
The War Room with the Big Board in the film

Dr. Strangelove was filmed at Shepperton Studios, near London, as Sellers was in the middle of a divorce at the time and unable to leave England. The sets occupied three main sound stages: the Pentagon War Room, the B-52 Stratofortress bomber and the last one containing both the motel room and General Ripper's office and outside corridor. The studio's buildings were also used as the Air Force base exterior. The film's set design was done by Ken Adam, the production designer of several James Bond films (at the time he had already worked on Dr. No). The black-and-white cinematography was by Gilbert Taylor, and the film was edited by Anthony Harvey and an uncredited Kubrick. The original musical score for the film was composed by Laurie Johnson, and the special effects were done by Wally Veevers. The opening theme is an instrumental version of "Try a Little Tenderness". The theme of the chorus from the bomb run scene is a modification of "When Johnny Comes Marching Home". Sellers and Kubrick got along well during the film's production and shared a love of photography.

For the War Room, Ken Adam first designed a two-level set which Kubrick initially liked, only to decide later that it was not what he wanted. Adam next began work on the design that was used in the film, an expressionist set that was compared with The Cabinet of Dr. Caligari and Fritz Lang's Metropolis. It was an enormous concrete room (130 feet (40 m) long and 100 feet (30 m) wide, with a 35-foot (11 m)-high ceiling) suggesting a bomb shelter, with a triangular shape (based on Kubrick's idea that this particular shape would prove the most resistant against an explosion). One side of the room was covered with gigantic strategic maps reflecting in a shiny black floor inspired by dance scenes in Fred Astaire films. In the middle of the room there was a large circular table lit from above by a circle of lamps, suggesting a poker table. Kubrick insisted that the table would be covered with green baize (although this could not be seen in the black-and-white film) to reinforce the actors' impression that they are playing 'a game of poker for the fate of the world.' Kubrick asked Adam to build the set ceiling in concrete to force the director of photography to use only the on-set lights from the circle of lamps. Moreover, each lamp in the circle of lights was carefully placed and tested until Kubrick was happy with the result.

Lacking cooperation from the Pentagon in the making of the film, the set designers reconstructed the aircraft cockpit to the best of their ability by comparing the cockpit of a B-29 Superfortress and a single photograph of the cockpit of a B-52 and relating this to the geometry of the B-52's fuselage. The B-52 was state-of-the-art in the 1960s, and its cockpit was off-limits to the film crew. When some United States Air Force personnel were invited to view the reconstructed B-52 cockpit, they said that "it was absolutely correct, even to the little black box which was the CRM." It was so accurate that Kubrick was concerned about whether Adam's team had carried out all its research legally.

In several shots of the B-52 flying over the polar ice en route to Russia, the shadow of the actual camera plane, a Boeing B-17 Flying Fortress, is visible on the icecap below. The B-52 was a scale model composited into the Arctic footage, which was sped up to create a sense of jet speed. Home movie footage included in Inside the Making of Dr. Strangelove on the 2001 Special Edition DVD release of the film shows clips of the B-17 with a cursive "Dr. Strangelove" painted over the rear entry hatch on the right side of the fuselage.

In 1967, some of the flying footage from Dr. Strangelove was re-used in The Beatles' television film Magical Mystery Tour. As told by editor Roy Benson in the BBC radio documentary Celluloid Beatles, the production team of Magical Mystery Tour lacked footage to cover the sequence for the song "Flying". Benson had access to the aerial footage filmed for the B-52 sequences of Dr. Strangelove, which was stored at Shepperton Studios. The use of the footage prompted Kubrick to call Benson to complain.

=== Fail Safe ===
Red Alert author Peter George collaborated on the screenplay with Kubrick and satirist Terry Southern. Red Alert was more solemn than its film version, and it did not include the character Dr. Strangelove, though the main plot and technical elements were quite similar. A novelization of the actual film, rather than a reprint of the original novel, was published by Peter George, based on an early draft in which the narrative is bookended by the account of aliens, who, having arrived at a desolated Earth, try to piece together what has happened. It was reissued in October 2015 by Candy Jar Books, featuring never-before-published material on Strangelove's early career.

During the filming of Dr. Strangelove, Stanley Kubrick learned that Fail Safe, a film with a similar theme, was being produced. Although Fail Safe was to be an ultrarealistic thriller, Kubrick feared that its plot resemblance would damage his film's box office potential, especially if it were released first. Indeed, the novel Fail-Safe (on which the film is based) is so similar to Red Alert that Peter George sued on charges of plagiarism and settled out of court. What worried Kubrick the most was that Fail Safe boasted the acclaimed director Sidney Lumet and the first-rate dramatic actors Henry Fonda as the American president and Walter Matthau as the adviser to the Pentagon, Professor Groeteschele. Kubrick decided to throw a legal wrench into Fail Safe's production gears. Lumet recalled in the documentary Inside the Making of Dr. Strangelove: "We started casting. Fonda was already set ... which of course meant a big commitment in terms of money. I was set, Walter [Bernstein, the screenwriter] was set ... And suddenly, this lawsuit arrived, filed by Stanley Kubrick and Columbia Pictures."

Kubrick argued that Fail Safe's own source novel Fail-Safe (1962) had been plagiarized from Peter George's Red Alert, to which Kubrick owned creative rights. He pointed out unmistakable similarities in intentions between the characters Groeteschele and Strangelove. The plan worked, and the suit was settled out of court, with the agreement that Columbia Pictures, which had financed and was distributing Strangelove, also buy Fail Safe, which had been an independently financed production. Kubrick insisted that the studio release his movie first, and Fail Safe opened eight months after Dr. Strangelove, to critical acclaim but mediocre ticket sales.

=== Ending ===
The end of the film shows Dr. Strangelove exclaiming, "Mein Führer, I can walk!" before cutting to footage of nuclear explosions, with Vera Lynn and her audience singing "We'll Meet Again". This footage comes from nuclear tests such as shot "Baker" of Operation Crossroads at Bikini Atoll, the Trinity test, a test from Operation Sandstone and the hydrogen bomb tests from Operation Redwing and Operation Ivy. In some shots, old warships (such as the German heavy cruiser Prinz Eugen), which were used as targets, are plainly visible. In others, the smoke trails of rockets used to create a calibration backdrop can be seen. Goon Show writer and friend of Sellers Spike Milligan was credited with suggesting Vera Lynn's song for the ending.

=== Original ending ===
The cream pie fight was removed from the final cut.

It was originally planned for the film to end with a scene that depicted everyone in the War Room involved in a pie fight. Accounts vary as to why the pie fight was cut. In a 1969 interview, Kubrick said, "I decided it was farce and not consistent with the satiric tone of the rest of the film." Critic Alexander Walker observed that "the cream pies were flying around so thickly that people lost definition, and you couldn't really say whom you were looking at." Nile Southern, son of screenwriter Terry Southern, suggested the fight was intended to be less jovial: "Since they were laughing, it was unusable, because instead of having that totally black, which would have been amazing, like, this blizzard, which in a sense is metaphorical for all of the missiles that are coming, as well, you just have these guys having a good old time. So, as Kubrick later said, 'it was a disaster of Homeric proportions.'"

=== Effects of the Kennedy assassination on the film ===
A first test screening of the film was scheduled for November 22, 1963, the day of the assassination of John F. Kennedy. The film was just weeks from its scheduled premiere, but because of the assassination, the release was delayed until late January 1964, as it was felt that the public was in no mood for such a film any sooner.

During post-production, one line by Slim Pickens, "a fella could have a pretty good weekend in Dallas with all that stuff", was dubbed to change "Dallas" to "Vegas", since Dallas was where Kennedy was killed. The original reference to Dallas survives in the English audio of the French-subtitled version of the film.

The assassination also serves as another possible reason that the pie-fight scene was cut. In the scene, after Muffley takes a pie in the face, General Turgidson exclaims: "Gentlemen! Our gallant young president has been struck down in his prime!" Editor Anthony Harvey stated that the scene "would have stayed, except that Columbia Pictures were horrified, and thought it would offend the president's family." Kubrick and others have said that the scene had already been cut before preview night because it was inconsistent with the rest of the film.

=== Re-release in 1994 ===
In 1994, the film was re-released. While the 1964 release used a 1.85:1 aspect ratio, the new print was in the slightly squarer 1.66:1 (5:3) ratio that Kubrick had originally intended.

== Themes ==
=== Satirizing the Cold War ===
Dr. Strangelove ridicules nuclear war planning. It mocks numerous contemporary Cold War attitudes such as the "missile gap" but it primarily directs its satire on the theory of mutually assured destruction (MAD), in which each side is supposed to be deterred from a nuclear war by the prospect of a universal cataclysm regardless of who "won". Military strategist and former physicist Herman Kahn, in the book On Thermonuclear War (1960), used the theoretical example of a "doomsday machine" to illustrate the limitations of MAD.

The concept of such a machine is consistent with MAD doctrine when it is logically pursued to its conclusion. It thus worried Kahn that the military might like the idea of a doomsday machine and build one. Kahn, a leading critic of MAD and the Eisenhower administration's doctrine of massive retaliation upon the slightest provocation by the USSR, considered MAD to be foolish bravado, and urged the United States to instead plan for proportionality, and thus even a limited nuclear war. With this reasoning, Kahn became one of the architects of the flexible response doctrine which, while superficially resembling MAD, allowed for the possibility of responding to a limited nuclear strike with a proportional, or calibrated, return of fire (see Conflict escalation).

Kahn educated Kubrick on the concept of the semi-realistic "cobalt-thorium G" doomsday machine, and then Kubrick used the concept for the film. Kahn in his writings and talks would often come across as cold and calculating, for example, with his use of the term "megadeaths" and in his willingness to estimate how many human lives the United States could lose and still rebuild economically. Kahn's dispassionate attitude towards millions of deaths is reflected in Turgidson's remark to the president about the outcome of a preemptive nuclear war: "Mr. President, I'm not saying we wouldn't get our hair mussed. But I do say no more than ten to twenty million killed, tops, uh, depending on the breaks." Turgidson has a binder that is labelled "World Targets in Megadeaths", a term coined in 1953 by Kahn and popularized in his 1960 book On Thermonuclear War.

The characters of Buck Turgidson and Jack D. Ripper both satirize the real-life Gen. Curtis LeMay of the Strategic Air Command.

=== Sexual themes ===
In the months following the film's release, director Stanley Kubrick received a fan letter from Legrace G. Benson of the Department of History of Art at Cornell University interpreting the film as being sexually layered. The director wrote back to Benson and confirmed the interpretation, "Seriously, you are the first one who seems to have noticed the sexual framework from intromission (the planes going in) to the last spasm (Kong's ride down and detonation at target)."

== Release ==
Dr. Strangelove was released January 29, 1964 (the copyright date onscreen is 1963). The film earned US$9,164,370 at the domestic box office, with modest additional earnings from its international release in the United Kingdom, Portugal, and Australia. The film was re-released domestically in 1994 and several times subsequently internationally.

== Reception ==
=== Critical response ===
On the review aggregator website Rotten Tomatoes, 97% of 145 critics' reviews are positive, with an average rating of 9.5/10. The website's consensus reads: "Stanley Kubrick's brilliant Cold War satire remains as funny and razor-sharp today as it was in 1964." Dr. Strangelove is Kubrick's highest-rated film on the site. Metacritic, which uses a weighted average, assigned the film a score of 97 out of 100, based on 32 critics, indicating "universal acclaim". The film is ranked number 7 in the All-Time High Scores chart of Metacritic's Video/DVD section.

The film was selected for preservation in the United States National Film Registry when the registry began in 1989. It was on Roger Ebert's list of The Great Movies, and he described it as "arguably the best political satire of the century". One of the most celebrated of all film comedies, in 1998, Time Out conducted a reader's poll and Dr. Strangelove was voted the 47th greatest film of all time. Entertainment Weekly voted it at No. 14 on their list of 100 Greatest Movies of All Time. in 2002, it was ranked as the 5th best film in Sight & Sound poll of best films. John Patterson of The Guardian wrote, "There had been nothing in comedy like Dr Strangelove ever before. All the gods before whom the America of the stolid, paranoid 50s had genuflected—the Bomb, the Pentagon, the National Security State, the President himself, Texan masculinity and the alleged Commie menace of water-fluoridation—went into the wood-chipper and never got the same respect ever again." It is also listed as number 26 on Empire's 500 Greatest Movies of All Time, and in 2010 it was listed by Time magazine as one of the 100 best films since the publication's inception in 1923. In 2006, the Writers Guild of America ranked its screenplay the 12th best ever written.

In 2000, readers of Total Film magazine voted it the 24th greatest comedic film of all time. The film ranked 42nd in the BBC's 2015 list of the 100 greatest American films. The film was selected as the 2nd best comedy of all time in a poll of 253 film critics from 52 countries conducted by the BBC in 2017.

The February 2020 issue of New York Magazine lists Dr. Strangelove as among "The Best Movies That Lost Best Picture at the Oscars."

In 2024, filmmaker Michael Mann cited it as one of his favorite films of all time.

=== Studio response ===
Columbia Pictures' early reaction to Dr. Strangelove was unenthusiastic. In "Notes From The War Room", in the summer 1994 issue of Grand Street magazine, co-screenwriter Terry Southern recalled that, as production neared the end, "It was about this time that word began to reach us, reflecting concern as to the nature of the film in production. Was it anti-American? Or just anti-military? And the jackpot question: Was it, in fact, anti-American to whatever extent it was anti-military?"

Southern recalled how Kubrick grew concerned about seeming apathy and distancing by studio heads Abe Schneider and Mo Rothman, and by Columbia's characterization of the film as "just a zany, novelty flick which did not reflect the views of the corporation in any way." Southern noted that Rothman was in "prominent attendance" at a ceremony in 1989 when the Library of Congress announced it as one of the first 25 films on the National Film Registry.

== Accolades ==
Award	Category	Recipient	Result
Academy Awards	Best Picture	Stanley Kubrick	Nominated
Academy Awards	Best Director	Stanley Kubrick	Nominated
Academy Awards	Best Actor	Peter Sellers	Nominated
Academy Awards	Best Adapted Screenplay	Stanley Kubrick, Peter George and Terry Southern	Nominated
BAFTA Awards	Best Film From Any Source	Stanley Kubrick	Won
BAFTA Awards	Best British Film	Stanley Kubrick	Won
BAFTA Awards	Best British Screenplay	Stanley Kubrick, Peter George, and Terry Southern	Nominated
BAFTA Awards	Best British Actor	Peter Sellers	Nominated
BAFTA Awards	Best Foreign Actor	Sterling Hayden	Nominated
BAFTA Awards	Best Art Direction (Black and White)	Ken Adam	Won
BAFTA Awards	UN Award		Won
Writers Guild of America Awards	Best Written American Comedy		Won
Hugo Awards	Best Dramatic Presentation		Won
Belgian Film Critics Association	Grand Prix		Won
New York Film Critics Circle	Best Film		Nominated
New York Film Critics Circle	Best Director	Stanley Kubrick	Won
New York Film Critics Circle	Best Screenplay	Stanley Kubrick, Peter George, and Terry Southern	Nominated
Silver Ribbon	Best Foreign Director	Stanley Kubrick	Won

The film ranked No. 32 on TV Guide's list of the 50 Greatest Movies on TV (and Video).

American Film Institute included the film as #26 in AFI's 100 Years...100 Movies, #3 in AFI's 100 Years...100 Laughs, #64 in AFI's 100 Years...100 Movie Quotes ("Gentlemen, you can't fight in here! This is the War Room!") and #39 in AFI's 100 Years...100 Movies (10th Anniversary Edition).

== Canceled sequel ==
In 1995, Kubrick enlisted Terry Southern to script a sequel titled Son of Strangelove. Kubrick had Terry Gilliam in mind to direct. The script was never completed, but index cards laying out the story's basic structure were found among Southern's papers after he died in October 1995. It was set largely in underground bunkers, where Dr. Strangelove had taken refuge with a group of women.

In 2013, Gilliam commented, "I was told after Kubrick died – by someone who had been dealing with him – that he had been interested in trying to do another Strangelove with me directing. I never knew about that until after he died but I would have loved to."

== Stage adaptation ==
On July 14, 2023, it was announced that a stage adaptation of the film would be produced, co-adapted by Armando Iannucci and Sean Foley and starring Steve Coogan. It premiered in London's West End at the Noël Coward Theatre in October 2024. It is the first stage adaptation of Kubrick's works.

== See also ==
- List of cult films
- Dead Hand (nuclear war)
- Politics in fiction
- Stanley Kubrick Archive

== Sources ==
- King, Mike (2008). "Dr. Strangelove". The American Cinema of Excess: Extremes of the National Mind on Film. McFarland. pp. 46–49. ISBN 978-0786439881.
- Ellsberg, Daniel "The Doomsday Machine" New York: Bloomsbury Publishing, 2017 ISBN 978-1-60819-670-8.
- Dolan, Edward F. Jr. Hollywood Goes to War. London: Bison Books, 1985. ISBN 0-86124-229-7.
- Hardwick, Jack and Schnepf, Ed. "A Viewer's Guide to Aviation Movies." The Making of the Great Aviation Films, General Aviation Series, Volume 2, 1989.
- Henriksen, Margot A. (1987). Dr. Strangelove's America: Society and Culture in the Atomic Age. University of California Press. ISBN 978-0-520-08310-3.
- Oriss, Bruce. When Hollywood Ruled the Skies: The Aviation Film Classics of World War II. Hawthorne, California: Aero Associates Inc., 1984. ISBN 0-9613088-0-X.
- Rice, Julian (2008). Kubrick's Hope: Discovering Optimism from 2001 to Eyes Wide Shut. Rowman & Littlefield. ISBN 978-0-8108-6206-7.
- Wheeler Winston Dixon Dr. Strangelove essay at National Film Registry
- Daniel Eagan Dr. Strangelove essay in America's Film Legacy: The Authoritative Guide to the Landmark Movies in the National Film Registry, A&C Black, 2010 ISBN 0826429777, pages 598–600
- Golden, Mike (June 7, 2010). La Force, Thessaly (ed.). "Terry Southern In Full". The Paris Review. "We ran an excerpt from an interview Mike Golden conducted with Southern that appeared in the spring of 1996 (issue 138). After the jump is, as promised, the exchange in full, where Southern discusses making Easy Rider with Dennis Hopper, and the missing pie-fight scene from Dr. Strangelove:"
- Southern, Terry (1962). "Notes from The War Room". Grand Street. No. 49. Archived from the original on June 18, 2003.
- Southern, Terry (1962). "An Interview with Stanley Kubrick, Director of Lolita". Esquire. Archived from the original on April 12, 2008. "unpublished"

- Southern, Terry; Southern, Nile (Fall 2004). "Check-Up With Dr. Strangelove". Filmmaker Magazine.

- Don't Panic covers Dr. Strangelove (archived)
- Brian Siano "Commentary on Dr. Strangelove" at visual-memory.co.uk
- Grant B. Stillman "Last Secrets of Strangelove Revealed" at visual-memory.co.uk
- Dr. Strangelove Study Guide by Dan Lindley. See also:

- Dr. Strangelove notes longer version by Dan Lindley

- "Dr. Strangelove: The Darkest Room", an essay by David Bromwich at the Criterion Collection
- Ann Hornaday, "The 34 best political movies ever made", ranked No. 6, The Washington Post (January 23, 2020)
