= Fail-Safe (novel) =

1962 novel by Eugene Burdick and Harvey Wheeler

- First edition
- Author: Eugene Burdick; Harvey Wheeler
- Language: English
- Genre: Political thriller
- Published: October 22, 1962
- Publisher: McGraw-Hill
- Publication place: United States
- Media type: Print (hardback and paperback)
- Pages: 286
- ISBN: 0-07-008927-2

Fail-Safe is a bestselling American novel by Eugene Burdick and Harvey Wheeler. Expanded from Wheeler's short story "Abraham '59" (originally published in the Winter 1959 issue of Dissent under the pen name F. B. Aiken), it was initially serialized in three installments in the Saturday Evening Post on October 13, 20, and 27, 1962, during the Cuban Missile Crisis.

The novel was published in book form on October 22, 1962, and was then adapted into a 1964 film of the same name directed by Sidney Lumet and starring Henry Fonda, Dan O'Herlihy, and Walter Matthau. In 2000, the novel was adapted again for a televised play, broadcast live in black and white on CBS. All three works have the same theme, accidental nuclear war, with the same plot.

Fail-Safe was purported to be so similar to an earlier novel, Red Alert (1958), that the latter's author, Peter George, and film producer Stanley Kubrick (whose own forthcoming picture Dr. Strangelove was loosely adapted from George's novel) sued on a charge of copyright infringement, settling out of court.

== Title ==
The title refers to the "fail-safe point" used by the Strategic Air Command (SAC) to prevent any SAC bomber from accidentally crossing into Soviet airspace and precipitating a nuclear war. In general, a fail safe ensures that, as far as possible, the machine or process will not make things worse in the event of something going wrong. The title's irony is that the nature of SAC's fail-safe protocols could make things worse, causing the event it was intended to prevent.

== Plot summary ==
In 1967, a U.S. Air Force command center receives information that an unknown aircraft is approaching from Europe. The alert status of the Strategic Air Command's (SAC) bomber forces is raised, a standard precaution against a sneak attack. The unknown aircraft then disappears from radar, causing the alert status to continue to increase, leading to the bombers being sent into the air to the fail-safe points. From there, they can proceed to their targets only if they receive a special attack code from the on-board "fail-safe box". After a short time, the unknown target is reacquired and identified as an off-course commercial airliner. The SAC threat level is reduced, and the bomber fleet is sent a recall order.

An unobserved electronic technical failure at the height of the alert allows the attack code to be accidentally transmitted to Group Six, which consists of six Vindicator supersonic bombers. Colonel Grady, the head of the group, tries to contact SAC Headquarters in Omaha, Nebraska to verify the fail-safe order (called Positive Check), but Soviet radio jamming prevents Grady from hearing them. Concluding that the fail-safe order and the radio jamming could mean only nuclear war, Grady orders Group Six to fly towards Moscow.

At meetings in Omaha, at the Pentagon, and in the fallout shelter of the White House, American politicians, generals and scholars debate the cause and implications of the attack. Professor Groteschele, an influential "nuclear wise man" advising the Pentagon, (Note: He is introduced as being among the first of a new class of postwar academic strategists, contemplating graduated and winnable ways to wage nuclear war, that includes Henry Kissinger and Herman Kahn, both explicitly named in ch. 5 along with other contemporary advisers.) suggests that the United States follow this accidental attack with a full-scale attack to force the Soviets to surrender. The President of the United States (Note: He is unnamed but apparently modeled on John F. Kennedy. He is described as young and having a New England accent.) refuses to consider such a course of action.

Instead, he orders the Air Force to shoot down the bombers. Officers at SAC and in the pursuing fighter jets protest, stating that the fighters cannot easily catch the bombers and will run out of fuel over the Arctic Ocean in the attempt. The President orders them to try anyway, and the six "Skyscrapper" supersonic fighters (Note: F-104 Starfighter-like aircraft.) in the area engage their afterburners and, just prior to their fuel running out, fire their rockets in futile attempts to hit the bombers. The fighters fall into the sea, and the pilots are lost.

The President contacts the Premier of the Soviet Union, Nikita Khrushchev, and offers assistance in attacking the group. The Soviets decline at first; however, they soon decide to accept it. At SAC headquarters, a fight breaks out over the idea of working with the Soviets to shoot down their own aircraft. Air Force General Bogan attempts to stop the attack, but his executive officer, Colonel Cascio, wants it to continue. Cascio attempts to take over command of SAC, but is stopped by the Air Police.

Meanwhile, the Soviet PVO Strany air defense forces manage to shoot down only two of the six planes. The Soviets accept American help and shoot down a third plane. Two bombers and a support plane remain on course to Moscow. Bogan tells Marshal Nevsky, the Soviet air defense commander, to ignore Plane #6 (the support plane with radar decoys and electronic countermeasures) because it carries no nuclear weapons. Nevsky, who mistrusts Bogan, instead orders his Soviet aircraft to attack all three planes. Plane 6's last feint guarantees that the two remaining bombers can successfully attack. Following the failure, Nevsky collapses.

As the two planes approach Moscow, Colonel Grady uses the radio to contact SAC to inform them that they are about to drop their bombs. As a last-ditch effort, the Soviets fire nuclear-tipped missiles to form a fireball in an attempt to destroy the low-flying Vindicators. A Vindicator shoots up one last decoy, which successfully leads the Soviet missiles high in the air. However, one missile explodes earlier than expected; the second bomber blows up, but Colonel Grady's plane survives. With the radio channel still open, the President attempts to persuade Grady that there is no war. Believing that such a late recall attempt must be a Soviet trick, as per his training, Grady ignores them.

The nearby explosion of Soviet missiles exposes the bomber crew to a massive radiation dose, and Grady tells his crew, "We're not just walking wounded; we're walking dead men." He intends to fly the aircraft over Moscow and detonate the bombs on board. Believing that the United States has already been devastated by a Soviet nuclear attack, his co-pilot agrees saying "There's nothing to go home to."

When it becomes apparent that one bomber will get through Soviet defenses and destroy Moscow with its two 20-megaton bombs, the U.S. president states that he will order an American bomber to destroy New York City at the same time, using four 20-megaton bombs, targeting the Empire State Building as ground zero; this also involves a grave personal sacrifice, as the First Lady is visiting New York, and he decides not to warn her. On hearing the New York attack plan, the supposedly atheist Communist leader bursts out with "Holy Mother of God!" He is appalled but realizes that it is the only way to prevent a worldwide nuclear war which will probably destroy humanity as "others" (presumably the Soviet military) would not accept the unilateral destruction of Moscow, and would depose him and retaliate against the West. Moscow is bombed and thereafter the New York bombs are dropped by a senior general within SAC, a friend of the President who orders his crew to let him handle the bombing run by himself, assuming responsibility for the destruction of New York; he then takes his own life.

== Lawsuit ==
The book purportedly resembled the 1958 novel Red Alert by Peter George (which was adapted by George and Stanley Kubrick into the mutually assured destruction satire Dr. Strangelove in 1964, as well) so closely that George filed a lawsuit for copyright infringement, intending to be allowed to release their Dr. Strangelove before the film version of Fail-Safe. The suit was settled out of court, with the agreement for the film version of Fail-Safe to wait until well after Dr. Strangelove had been released, greatly reducing its popularity at the box office, given their perceived commonality.

== See also ==
- Red Alert, earlier novel with a similar theme
- Trinity's Child, later book and film with a similar theme
