= Harvey Wheeler =

American writer and scholar

- Born: October 17, 1918; Waco, Texas
- Died: September 6, 2004 (aged 85); Carpinteria, California
- Education: Subiaco Academy
- Alma mater: Indiana University Bloomington (B.A., M.A.); Harvard University (Ph.D.)
- Notable work: Fail-Safe (1962)
- Spouse: !-- Noreen Wheeler (Burleigh) -->
- Children: 3

John Harvey Wheeler Jr. (October 17, 1918 – September 6, 2004) was an American author, political scientist, and scholar. He was best known as co-author with Eugene Burdick of Fail-Safe (1962), an early Cold War novel that depicted what could easily go wrong in an age on the verge of nuclear war. The novel was made into a movie, directed by Sidney Lumet and starring Henry Fonda, in 1964. In later years, Wheeler was a founding editor of the Journal of Social and Biological Structures, 1982, and an early advocate of online education and the Internet as a democratizing tool. He taught a course in "OnLine Publishing" for Connected Education in the mid-to-late 1980s.

== Biography ==
Wheeler was born on October 17, 1918, in Waco, Texas. He attended Subiaco Academy and Wabash College. He earned his bachelor's in 1946 and master's degree in 1950 from Indiana University Bloomington, and his PhD from Harvard University in 1950. He served in the United States Army from November 1942 to December 1945. He served in France in 1944 during World War II as a Technician Fifth Grade.

He taught at Harvard University, Johns Hopkins University; became full professor of political science at Washington and Lee University, where he wrote Fail-Safe. In 1960, he became a longtime fellow at the Center for the Study of Democratic Institutions in Santa Barbara, California. While at CSDI he wrote, edited or contributed to a dozen books, including Democracy in a Revolutionary Era (1968) and The Virtual Library (1987). Wheeler was an authority on Francis Bacon (1561–1626). He died on September 6, 2004, in Carpinteria, California.

== Books ==
- Lattimore the Scholar, (1953), co-author with George Boas; Baltimore.
- The Conservative Crisis, (1956), Public Affairs Press, Washington.
- Fail-Safe, (1962) Eugene Burdick & Harvey Wheeler, McGraw Hill; Re-published, 1999, by Ecco Press, now part of Harper-Collins.
- Democracy in a Revolutionary Era, (1968) Harvey Wheeler, Encyclopædia Britannica Bicentennial Perspectives; Published separately by Praeger. New York.
- Democracy in a Revolutionary Era, (1970) Praeger, New York.
- Beyond the Punitive Society, (1973) editor and contributor, W.H. Freeman, San Francisco.
- The Structure of Human Reflexion, (1990) Ed and contributor, Peter Lang, New York.

== Filmography ==
- Fail Safe (1964)
- Fail Safe (2000)
