= Eugene Burdick =

American writer and political scientist

- Born: Eugene Leonard Burdick; December 12, 1918; Sheldon, Iowa
- Died: July 26, 1965 (aged 46); San Diego, California
- Occupations: Political scientist, writer
- Spouse: Carol Burdick
- Children: 3
- Writing career
- Notable work: The Ugly American, Fail-Safe, The 480
- Military career
- Branch: United States Navy
- Service years: 1942-46
- Rank: Lieutenant commander
- Conflicts: World War II
- Awards: Navy and Marine Corps Medal

Eugene Leonard Burdick (December 12, 1918 – July 26, 1965) was an American political scientist, novelist, and non-fiction writer, co-author of The Ugly American (1958), Fail-Safe (1962), and author of The 480 (1965).

== Early life ==
He was born in Sheldon, Iowa, the son of Marie Ellerbroek and Jack Dale Burdick. His father was a socialist who named his son after Eugene V. Debs. His family moved to Los Angeles, California when he was four years of age. One of his pastimes growing up was surfing.

== Education and early career ==
He received his undergraduate degree in psychology from Stanford University. After the United States entered World War II, he served in the United States Navy from 1942 to 1946, attaining the rank of lieutenant commander. Burdick was awarded the Navy and Marine Corps Medal, the highest non-combat decoration awarded for heroism by the Navy, for rescuing four injured men by diving into a sea full of burning oil while under artillery fire.

Thereafter, he pursued graduate studies at Oxford University, where he was a Rhodes Scholar in 1948 and ultimately earned a PhD with a dissertation on the role of modern syndicalism in European politics.

Burdick spent much of his career as a professor of political science at the University of California, Berkeley, where he oversaw an integrated course in the social sciences (encompassing elements of political science, economics, sociology and philosophy) and served as a consultant to the university's administration. While on leave from 1950 to 1952, he served as assistant to the president of the Naval War College. Among other professional activities, he was a member of the governing board of the Center for the Study of Democratic Institutions and a member of the Indonesian-American Society, the Polynesian Research Society and the Migratory Labor Association.

== Writing career ==
He first gained national attention as a writer of fiction in 1947 when "Rest Camp on Maui," a short story derived from his wartime experiences that was published by Harper's Magazine, received the O. Henry Award second prize. In 1956 his first novel, The Ninth Wave, was published, and was a Book of the Month Club selection. At the close of the 1950s, he was among the first members of the Society for General Systems Research.

== Political views ==
He was a Cold War liberal, supporting the Vietnam War, though he was critical of how the United States government went about it. The Ugly American portrayed American representatives losing the battle for hearts and minds to the Soviet Union in the fictional Asian kingdom of Sarkhan. (The book's depictions created controversy: President Dwight Eisenhower called the book "sickening," claiming that it distorted the truth.) He also advocated nuclear disarmament.

He was scheduled to speak in defense of the administration at the Berkeley Teach-in in May 1965 before withdrawing at the last minute, alleging that those attending weren't interested in a dialogue.

== Death ==
Burdick died in 1965 of a heart attack, while playing tennis, in San Diego, California, at the age of 46. After his death, it was reported that he was a diabetic who struggled with chronic heart disease. He had also had a prior heart attack in 1959. Nevertheless, this had not prevented him from appearing as an extra-vigorous "Ballentine's Ale Man" in print and TV ads of the early 60's. He was survived by his wife Carol and three children.

== Works ==
- The Ninth Wave, 1956 (winner, Houghton Mifflin Literary Fellowship)
- The Ugly American, 1958, with William Lederer
- The Blue of Capricorn, 1961
- Fail-Safe, 1962, with Harvey Wheeler
- The 480, 1965
- Nina's Book, 1965
- Sarkhan: A Novel, 1966, with William Lederer Republished under the title The Deceptive American in 1977.
