= Hold Back the Night (disambiguation) =

Hold Back the Night is a 1956 film about the Korean War.

Hold Back the Night may also refer to:

- Hold Back the Night (novel), a 1951 novel by Pat Frank, on which the aforementioned film is based
- "Hold Back the Night", a 1975 song by the Trammps, remade by Graham Parker in 1977
- Hold Back the Night, a 1999 film directed by Phil Davis
- "Hold Back the Night", a song by the Protomen, originally released as a single in 2015 but re-recorded for their 2026 album Act III: This City Made Us
- "Hold Back the Night", a 2012 single by I Am Kloot from their album Let It All In
- Hold Back the Night, a 2015 live album by I Am Kloot
