= Robert Saudek (television executive) =

American TV producer and executive

Robert Saudek (April 11, 1911 – March 13, 1997) was an American TV producer and executive, son of flutist and conductor Victor Saudek (1879–1966).

== Career ==
A director and later a vice-president at the ABC Television Network in the late 1940s and early 1950s, Saudek is best remembered for creating the arts and culture variety television show Omnibus at the behest of the Ford Foundation. Saudek sought to bring uplifting entertainment to American television audiences by bringing them the best actors, musicians, scientists, authors, comedians, and cultural figures. Saudek also produced other cultural television programming, including Profiles in Courage.

Saudek's Harvard College roommate for all four years was James Agee, who wrote A Lincoln Portrait and other Omnibus scripts. Saudek hired Alistair Cooke to emcee the show. Among the artists appearing were Leonard Bernstein (seven shows), John F. Kennedy, Joseph Welch, Paul Robeson, James Dean, Orson Welles, Marion Anderson, Sugar Ray Robinson, Mickey Mantle, Frank Lloyd Wright, Nichols and May, Gene Kelly, Glen Gould, Igor Stravinsky and Agnes DeMille.

Over the course of his career, he was awarded eleven Emmys and seven Peabodys. The Road to the Wall, which Saudek produced for the United States Army's television show The Big Picture, was nominated for an Academy Award for Best Documentary Short.

He served on the Carnegie Commission, which worked to establish both PBS and the Corporation for Public Broadcasting.

Saudek founded the Museum of Broadcasting (now known as the Paley Center for Media) and later headed the Library of Congress's motion picture division.

== See also ==
- Dow Hour of Great Mysteries
