= Mary McDowell (disambiguation) =

Mary McDowell also refer to:

- Mary McDowell (1854–1936), American social reformer
- Mary Stone McDowell (1876–1955), American Quaker teacher
- Mary T. McDowell (born 1964), American technology executive
