= We Shall Return =

- Directed by: Phillip S. Goodman
- Written by: Pat Frank; Mel Arrighi
- Starring: Cesar Romero; Anthony Ray
- Distributed by: United International Pictures
- Release date: February 15, 1963
- Country: United States
- Language: English

We Shall Return is a 1963 American drama film directed by Philip S. Goodman and starring Cesar Romero and Anthony Ray. It follows the flight of a Cuban family to Florida following the Cuban Revolution of 1959 and their plans to overthrow Fidel Castro. Shot predominantly on location in Florida, the film would have its world premiere there as well, on February 15, 1963.

More than half a century later, We Shall Return retains the distinction of being both the only feature film written directly for the screen by novelist Pat Frank (whose work had already formed the basis for the 1956 film Hold Back the Night and numerous TV dramas, and would soon do so for Howard Hawks' 1964 comedy Man's Favorite Sport) and the only one scored by noted jazz saxophonist and composer-arranger Ed Summerlin.

== See also ==
- List of American films of 1963
