= Mr. Adam =

Novel by Pat Frank

- Author: Pat Frank
- Publisher: J. B. Lippincott Company
- Publication date: September 11, 1946
- Publication place: United States
- Pages: 252 (Hardcover)

Mr. Adam (1946) is the first novel written by Pat Frank, dealing with the effects of a nuclear mishap causing worldwide male infertility. Published by J. B. Lippincott Company, it was also released as an Armed Services Edition, a paperback by Pocket Books in 1948, and again in 1959 by Pocket Books with the tag Mr. Adam Was Wanted By Every Woman in the World. All told, it sold over 2 million copies.

== Plot summary ==
After a nuclear power plant in Mississippi explodes, it was soon realized that a previously unknown form of radiation was released. The radiation caused all men on Earth to become sterile, even boys who were still inside the mother's womb. However, ten months after the explosion in Mississippi, a doctor delivers a perfectly healthy baby girl. It's soon discovered that the child's father, who has the surname Adam, was more than a mile under the surface of Earth inside an old silver and lead mine during the explosion. It would appear that Mr. Adam is humanity's only hope to stave off extinction.

== Reception ==
One review referred to the comic novel as "a fat prank by Pat Frank." Eleanor Roosevelt wrote about the novel in her My Day column in September 1946, noting that the work is "pure imagination, but there is just enough possibility that it might come true to make one read it with interest." The New York Times found the book "part fantasy, part lampoon, and is still written with clarity, skill and wit. It makes you chuckle – yes, but it also provides food for thought which a lot of readers should and probably will find quite digestible."

Though not in the top 10 for the year, the book was a bestseller. The book reportedly sold over two million copies, including its paperback versions. Its success allowed Frank to retire at age 39 and focus on writing.

A stage version of the novel was less successful. The play rights were quickly sold, but it took over two years to reach the stage. One script was rejected, and a new one was written by Jack Kirkland, known for his great success with Tobacco Road. The original world premiere of the play was set for March 12, 1949 at the Lobero Theatre in Santa Barbara, California, but it was banned once designated "in bad taste". After other trial runs outside New York, the play lasted only a few days on Broadway at the Royale Theatre in May 1949 after getting poor reviews. Its cast included James Dobson, Elisabeth Fraser, Frank Albertson, Howard Freeman, and Emory Parnell.

== See also ==
- Pregnancy in science fiction
- The Last Man on Earth (1924)
- It's Great to Be Alive (1933)
