= Alas, Babylon =

1959 post-nuclear war novel by Pat Frank

- Cover of first edition (hardcover)
- Author: Pat Frank
- Language: English
- Genre: Apocalyptic novel
- Publisher: J. B. Lippincott
- Publication date: 1959
- Publication place: United States
- Media type: Print (hardback & paperback)
- Pages: 352
- ISBN: 978-0060741877

Alas, Babylon is a 1959 novel by American writer Pat Frank. It is an early example of post-nuclear apocalyptic fiction and has an entry in David Pringle's book Science Fiction: The 100 Best Novels. The novel deals with the effects of a nuclear war on the fictional small town of Fort Repose, Florida, which is based upon the actual city of Mount Dora, Florida, approximately 35 miles northwest of Orlando, Florida. The novel's title is derived from the Book of Revelation: "Alas, alas, that great city Babylon, that mighty city! for in one hour is thy judgment come." The cover art for the Bantam paperback edition was made by Robert Hunt.

== Plot ==
The novel starts in early December of an unspecified year in the early 1960s; the Soviet Union has just launched Sputnik 23. (Note: When the novel was published in 1959, only 3 spacecraft labelled Sputnik had been launched. A real craft sequentially dubbed Sputnik 23 by the American press was launched by the Soviet Union in November 1962.) Tensions have been escalating for two years between the United States and the Soviet Union for dominance in the Middle East and in the Mediterranean Sea. The Soviets are menacing Turkey from three sides through their proxies in Egypt, Syria and Iraq in order to gain control of the Bosporus and give free passage between the Black Sea and the Mediterranean to their large Mediterranean naval fleet. To counteract the Soviet threat, the United States established a military presence in Lebanon and is providing aid to their Turkish and Israeli allies. Meanwhile, the Soviets gained a temporary space supremacy through the launch of a fleet of militarized Sputniks; moreover, they are aware that, within three or four years, the United States will cover the gap. Intelligence from a Soviet officer who defected in Berlin provided information about a Soviet war plan involving a sudden, overwhelming nuclear first strike on U.S. and NATO military and civilian targets, in order to minimize retaliation and to ensure that the Soviet Union becomes the leading world power. According to the leaked war plan, the Soviet leadership considers acceptable the loss of 20 to 30 million of their own civilian population due to an anticipated retaliatory strike by NATO.

Randy Bragg, a failed political candidate and an attorney who occasionally practices law, lives an otherwise aimless life in the small Central Florida town of Fort Repose. The younger bachelor son of a prominent local family, his ancestors founded Fort Repose in the 1800s. Randy's older brother, Colonel Mark Bragg, a U.S. Air Force intelligence officer at Strategic Air Command (SAC) headquarters at Offutt Air Force Base in Omaha, Nebraska, sends a telegram to Randy ending in the words, "Alas, Babylon", a pre-established code between the brothers to warn of imminent disaster. Shortly thereafter, Mark flies his family down to Orlando in order to stay with Randy at Fort Repose for their protection while Mark remains at SAC headquarters.

Soon afterwards, a carrier-based U.S. Navy fighter pilot, attempting to intercept a Soviet plane over the Mediterranean, inadvertently destroys an ammunition depot at a large Soviet submarine base in Latakia, Syria. The explosion is mistaken for a large-scale U.S. air assault on the military facility and, by the following day, the Soviet Union retaliates with its planned full-scale nuclear strike against the United States and its allies. With Mark as a witness, U.S. intercontinental ballistic missiles are launched at the Soviet Union in retaliation. Randy and his guests awake to the shaking from the nuclear missile attacks on nearby military bases such as McCoy Air Force Base in Orlando and Naval Air Station Sanford; one explosion temporarily blinds Peyton, Randy's niece. The residents of Fort Repose later observe other mushroom clouds to the southwest and northeast, implying that MacDill Air Force Base and the city of Tampa as well as the city of Jacksonville and its multiple U.S. naval installations have also been destroyed.

Following what is simply referred to as "The Day", Fort Repose descends into chaos: tourists are trapped in their hotels, communication lines fail, the CONELRAD radio system barely operates, convicts escape from prisons, and a run on the banks makes currency worthless. In the weeks and months after the attack, sporadic news gathered through an old but still-functioning vacuum tube radio receiver show that many major cities of the U.S. are in ruins and vast regions of the Continental United States are labeled by the government as off-limits "contaminated zones." Because of the numerous U.S. Air Force and U.S. Navy installations from one end of the state to the other that were struck during the Soviet attack, Florida is among the contaminated areas, leaving the stranded survivors of Fort Repose without hope of immediate assistance. Most of the U.S. government has been eliminated, with the U.S. presidency defaulting to Josephine Vanbruuker-Brown, the former Secretary of Health, Education and Welfare who is believed to be leading the nation from a location in Colorado.

Other international broadcasts, heard over the shortwave radio of Randy's neighbor, retired Navy Rear Admiral Sam Hazzard, reveal that Western Europe was badly hit by Soviet missiles as well, mentioning a dire situation in southern France. Soviet leadership was eliminated by the U.S. retaliation and the Soviet capital was moved to Central Asia, but war still rages for months after the attack, although it is fought mostly between the remnants of the U.S. Air Force and scattered Soviet Navy nuclear submarines.

A Korean War veteran still serving as a U.S. Army Reserve infantry officer before the Soviet attack, Randy learns in a radio dispatch by President Vanbruuker-Brown that she has directed any surviving active duty or reserve U.S. military officers to form local militias to keep the peace domestically. This formally empowers Randy as the local authority under the current emergency situation. He then organizes a community self-defense force against bandits and tries to rid the community of radioactive jewelry brought into Fort Repose from the radioactive ruins of Miami. The search for alternative food sources is also prominent in the months following the attack, leading to the launch of a rag-tag fleet of fishing boats to sift the surrounding lakes, rivers and swamps for fish and to a desperate search for much-needed salt.

The following year, an Air Force helicopter arrives at Fort Repose. The crew assesses the status of the residents and the local environment, explaining that the area around Fort Repose is perhaps the largest patch of non-contaminated soil in Florida and that, after everything they have suffered, the survivors of Fort Repose managed to fare better than many other places in the US. Randy also learns that his brother, Mark, most likely died when Omaha and Offutt Air Force Base were destroyed by multiple Soviet nuclear missile strikes. When the crew of the helicopter offer to evacuate the residents out of Florida, the residents choose to stay.

It is eventually revealed that the United States formally won the war, but at a tremendous cost: the country lost almost 75% of its population. (Fewer than 45 million survivors are estimated overall; the population of the U.S. in the early 1960s had been approximately 180 million.) As well, the country lost most of its military, its infrastructure, and most of its natural resources—ironically, the U.S. government is planning to use the large stockpiles of military-grade uranium and plutonium left from the war to power the surviving towns and cities with nuclear reactors. The U.S. is now receiving food, fuel and medicine aid from third-world countries such as Thailand, Indonesia and Venezuela. According to a radio broadcast, the "Three Greats," India, China and Japan, have taken the role of the world's leading powers in place of the U.S. and the Soviet Union. The book ends by saying that things will not return to normal for 1,000 years and that Randy "...turned to face the thousand-year night."

== Reception ==
Galaxy reviewer Floyd C. Gale gave the novel a mixed review, rating it three stars out of five and concluding: "Frank stopped too soon with too little."

== Influence ==
Cover of Bantam Books 1979 paperback edition, ISBN 0-553-13260-1

=== People ===
- John Lennon, known for his pacifist views, was given a copy of Alas, Babylon by journalist Larry Kane in 1965. Lennon spent all night reading the book, fueling his anti-war fervor and envisioning the world's population attempting to crawl their way back from the horrors of a nuclear catastrophe.

=== Television ===
The post-apocalyptic TV series Jericho is partly inspired by Alas, Babylon. The story centers on the residents of the fictional city of Jericho, Kansas, in the aftermath of a nuclear attack on 23 major cities in the contiguous United States.

=== Literature ===
- In his critical study The Modern Weird Tale (2001), S. T. Joshi compares Alas, Babylon favourably with Stephen King's The Stand, calling the former "a more interesting treatment of the same basic theme."
- In the foreword of the 2005 edition of Alas, Babylon, David Brin notes that the book was instrumental in shaping his views on nuclear war and influenced his own book, The Postman (1982).
- In the acknowledgements section at the beginning of his post-apocalyptic novel One Second After (2009), William R. Forstchen credits Alas, Babylon as an influence in writing his novel about the small town of Black Mountain, North Carolina. The novel is set in a time after numerous electromagnetic pulses strike around the world, cutting off all sources of electricity to the town, and depicts the ensuing aftermath of sociological breakdown.
- John Ringo's 2013 Under a Graveyard Sky, the first in his Black Tide Rising series, starts with an emergency code using the phrase "AlasBabylon." Frank's book is referenced as the characters' inspiration for that code, and is briefly synopsized.

== Adaptations ==
An adaptation of Alas, Babylon was broadcast on April 3, 1960, as the 131st episode of the Playhouse 90 dramatic television series. It starred Don Murray, Burt Reynolds, and Rita Moreno.

== See also ==
- List of nuclear holocaust fiction
- Survivalism
