= Philip S. Goodman =

American screenwriter, producer, and director

- Born: Philip Solomon Goodman; February 20, 1926; New York City, New York, U.S.
- Died: May 2, 2015 (aged 89); New York City, New York, U.S.
- Occupations: Screenwriter, producer, director
- Years active: 1950–1965
- Spouse: Evelyn Twersky
- Children: 2 (including Nicholas)

Philip Solomon Goodman (February 20, 1926 – May 2, 2015) was an American screenwriter, producer, and director. He was perhaps best known for directing the drama film We Shall Return (1963), starring Cesar Romero. He also wrote for television series such as Profiles in Courage, Danger, Alfred Hitchcock Presents, Rocky King Detective, and Johnny Staccato. He also directed plays at the Actors Studio.

Goodman was born in New York City to Flora and Solomon Goodman. He graduated from Brooklyn College and the University of Southern California (USC). He served in the U.S. Army from 1944 to 1946 during World War II. He was married to Evelyn Twersky and had two children, Nicholas, a producer, and Jody, a lawyer.

Goodman died on May 2, 2015, in New York City, aged 89.
