= Johnny Staccato =

American TV detective series (1959–1960)

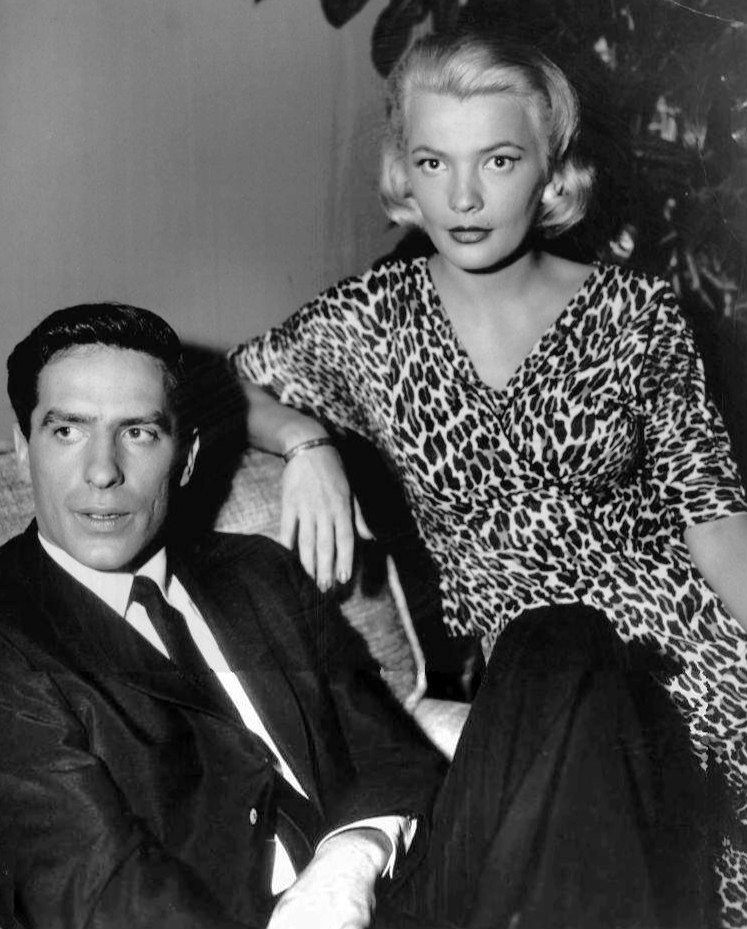
- John Cassavetes as Johnny Staccato with guest star and real-life spouse, Gena Rowlands, 1959.
- Also known as: Staccato
- Genre: Crime drama
- Starring: John Cassavetes; Eduardo Ciannelli
- Composer: Elmer Bernstein
- Country of origin: United States
- Original language: English
- No. of seasons: 1
- No. of episodes: 27

Production
- Executive producer: William Frye
- Producer: Everett Chambers
- Cinematography: Lionel Lindon A.S.C. Ray Cory; William A. Sickner; John F. Warren A.S.C. Bud Thackery; John L. Russell
- Editors: Irving Schoenberg, A.C.E. Eugene Pendleton; Edward Haire
- Running time: 30 minutes (approx)
- Production company: Revue Studios

Original release
- Network: NBC
- Release: September 10, 1959 – March 24, 1960

Johnny Staccato is an American private detective television series starring John Cassavetes that ran on NBC from September 10, 1959, through March 24, 1960. The program was initially titled Staccato.

== Synopsis ==
Titular character Johnny Staccato, played by John Cassavetes, is a jazz pianist and private detective. The setting for many episodes is a Greenwich Village jazz club belonging to his friend, Waldo, played by Eduardo Ciannelli.

The show featured many musicians, such as Barney Kessel, Shelly Manne, Red Mitchell, Red Norvo, and Johnny Williams. (Although the show was set in New York City, all of these men were closely identified with the West Coast jazz scene, and it was filmed largely in Los Angeles.) Elmer Bernstein composed both of the main theme tunes, and Stanley Wilson was music supervisor. Cassavetes also directed five episodes.

After its initial airing on NBC, ABC presented reruns of the series from March 27 to September 25, 1960.

On October 12, 2010, the series was released on Region 1 DVD by Timeless Media Group.

Episodes have aired on stations specializing in nostalgia programming, such as GetTV.

== Notable guest stars ==
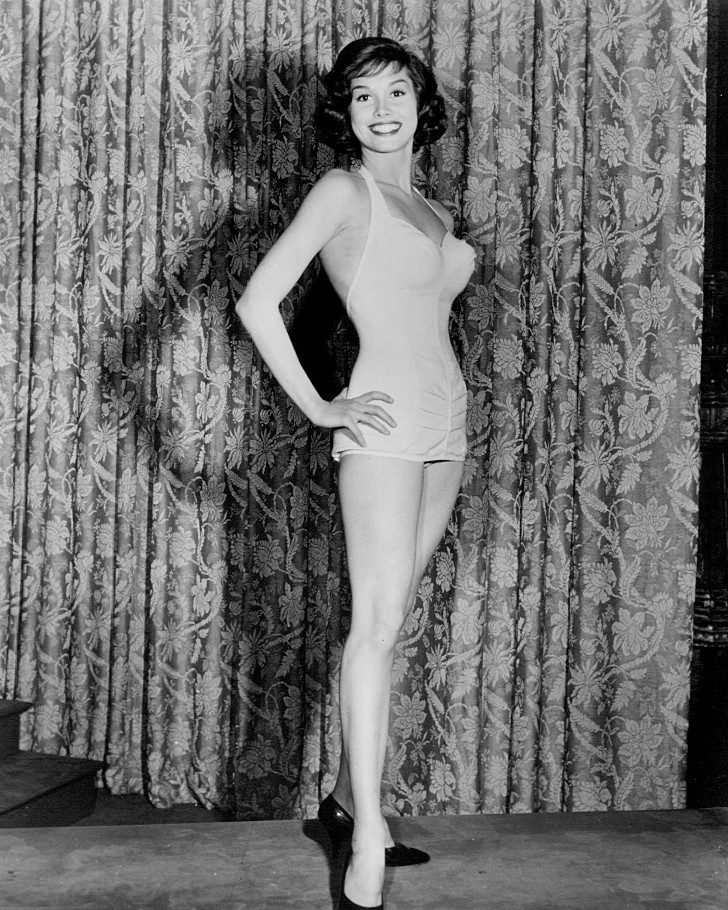
Mary Tyler Moore in Johnny Staccato, 1960

- Warren Berlinger
- Geraldine Brooks
- Walter Burke
- Míriam Colón
- Elisha Cook Jr. (twice)
- Lloyd Corrigan
- Frank DeKova
- Norman Fell
- Bert Freed
- Marianne Gaba
- Ingrid Goude
- Harry Guardino
- Arline Hunter
- Martin Landau
- Michael Landon
- Cloris Leachman
- Ruta Lee
- Sylvia Lewis
- Charles McGraw
- John Marley
- Elizabeth Montgomery
- Mary Tyler Moore
- Susan Oliver
- J. Pat O'Malley
- Gena Rowlands
- Vito Scotti
- Dean Stockwell
- Nita Talbot
- Arthur Tovey
- Jack Weston

== Episodes ==
No.	Title	Directed by	Written by	Original release date
1	"The Naked Truth"	Joseph Pevney	Richard Berg	September 10, 1959
Eduardo Ciannelli as Waldo, Chick Chandler as Phil Kovac, Michael Landon as Freddie Tate. cast Stacy Harris as A. J. Templer, Nick Cravat as Lotsie, Ruta Lee as Dee Dee, Robert H. Harris as Senator Bly, Frank Sully as Night Watchman. Uncredited: Monica Lewis [hat check girl] the musicians Pete Candoli (trumpet), Barney Kessel (guitar), Shelly Manne (drums), Red Mitchell (bass), Red Norvo (vibes), Johnny Williams (piano). Staccato investigates a scandal magazine's blackmail scheme that could end the promising career of a young male vocalist.
2	"Murder for Credit"	John Cassavetes	Story by : Laurence Mascott; Teleplay by : Richard Carr and Laurence Mascott	September 17, 1959
with Eduardo Ciannelli. cast Charles McGraw, Martin Landau, Marilyn Clark, Mel Berger, Bobbi Byrnes, Jimmy Joyce. the musicians featuring Pete Candoli, with Red Mitchell, Bob Bain, Johnny Williams, Mel Lewis. A bandleader making a comeback (Charles McGraw) tells Staccato that he has been marked for death by four men, just before he is killed.
3	"The Parents"	Robert B. Sinclair	Douglas Taylor	September 24, 1959
with Eduardo Ciannelli. cast Shirley Knight as Shirley, Frank Dana as Jerry, John Hoyt as Ashton, Vic Perrin as The Doctor, Steve Gravers as Curt, Frank London as Shad, Lisa Davis Waltz as Claire. the musicians Nora Evans, Milt Holland, Ronnie Lang. The setting is a beatnik club, rather than Waldo's, and Eduardo Ciannelli is credited but does not appear. A young married couple is expecting a child and is about to lose it to the black market before Staccato comes to their aid.
4	"The Shop of the Four Winds"	Boris Sagal	Sidney Michaels	October 8, 1959
with Eduardo Ciannelli. cast Nobu McCarthy as Fumiko, Don Gordon as Casper, Fuji as Tikon, Robert Kino as Toshio, Bob Okazaki as Clerk. the musicians Pete Candoli (trumpet), Barney Kessel (guitar), Shelly Manne (drums), Red Mitchell (bass), Johnny Williams (piano). Staccato goes searching for a ruthless swindler who has cheated a group of Japanese immigrants seeking citizenship papers.
5	"Nature of the Night / The Nature of the Night"	Boris Sagal	Story by : Henry Kane; Teleplay by : Henry Kane and Richard Carr	October 15, 1959
guest star Dean Stockwell. with Eduardo Ciannelli. cast Vladimir Sokoloff as Father Keeley, J. Pat O'Malley as Sgt. Lou Bacus, Janet Lake as Girl, Roy Mallinson as First Policeman, Harry Strang as Second Policeman. the musicians Jack Costanzo, "Mr. Bongo" And His Quartet. The neighborhood of Waldo's club is terrorized by a young man (Dean Stockwell), whose wife has left him and whose victims all have her blonde hair.
6	"Viva, Paco!"	James Hogan	Gerald Orsini	October 22, 1959
with Eduardo Ciannelli. cast Jimmy Murphy as Paco Vidella, Miriam Colon as Mariana Vidella, Val Avery as Corky Lewis, John Tarangelo as Bobby Baker, Larry Doyle as Benji, Vici Raaf as Cissy Lamar, Flicca McKenna as First Girl. Uncredited: Garry Walberg [police sergeant Sullivan] Staccato traces a boxer's disappearance, then sets out to find the person who is trying to frame the pugilist in order to prevent him from fighting the champion.
7	"Evil"	John Cassavetes	Richard Carr	October 29, 1959
Alexander Scourby as Brother Max. cast Lloyd Corrigan as Brother Thomas, Elizabeth Patterson as Beatrice, Robert Carricart as Barney, Elisha Cook as Conrad, Charles Thompson as Old Player, Harry Whisner as Bartender, Helen Dietrich as Woman Pianist. Uncredited: Snub Pollard [member of Brother Max's congregation] Waldo's club and Eduardo Ciannelli do not appear. Staccato must choose between exposing a dishonest preacher (Alexander Scourby) and destroying the faith the preacher has kindled in the small mission.
8	"Murder in Hi – Fi"	Bernard Girard	Hal Biller and Austin Kalish	November 5, 1959
with Eduardo Ciannelli. cast Susan Oliver as Barbara Ames, Robert Carricart as Pete Sharvi, Ed Prentiss as Joe Radick, Dick Crockett as Sandblaster, Jean Harvey as Cleaning Woman, Donald P. Journeaux as Butler. Staccato receives a beating from hoodlums after he pays attention to a new singer that's just been hired by Waldo.
9	"Fly Baby, Fly"	Robert B. Sinclair	Philip S. Goodman	November 12, 1959
special guest star Gena Rowlands. cast Howard Freeman as Mr. Morse, Dort Clark as Guy, Nesdon Booth as Mr. Jones, Ingrid Goude as Girl, Jan Brooks as Airline Hostess, Mike Steele as Pilot, Dennis Sallas as Bartender. Uncredited (in order of appearance): Harry Wilson [airplane passenger], Shep Houghton [airplane passenger] Staccato is involved in a mystery after he is hired to deliver what is supposed to be a briefcase full of gems to Arizona, but instead is a bomb.
10	"Tempted"	Robert B. Sinclair	Story by : Francis Cockrell; Teleplay by : Richard Carr and Francis Cockrell	November 19, 1959
guest star Elizabeth Montgomery. with Eduardo Ciannelli. cast Fred Beir as Fulton, Murray Alper as Policeman, Lionel Decker as Man with mustache, Marty Greene as First Man. Uncredited: Harry Wilson [ugly man outside jewelry store], Staccato becomes involved in a double-cross when he agrees to guard a valuable necklace from the ex-wife (Elizabeth Montgomery) of one of his former bandmates.
11	"The Poet's Touch"	Robert Parrish	Robert Hector & Hollis Alpert	November 26, 1959
In his search for a missing poet, Staccato's search leads him through a number of off-beat places, as well as murder.
12	"The Wild Reed"	Boris Sagal	Richard Carr	December 3, 1959
Staccato visits a nightclub and uncovers a narcotics racket.
13	"A Piece of Paradise"	John Cassavetes	Robert L. Jacks	December 10, 1959
The murder of a dance hall girl leads to a startling discovery.
14	"The Return"	James Hogan	James Landis	December 17, 1959
A Korean War veteran, suspicious of his wife over imagined affairs, escapes from a mental hospital and is intent on killing her.
15	"The Unwise Men"	Robert B. Sinclair	Story by : Shirl Hendryx & Frank Dana; Teleplay by : Shirl Hendryx	December 24, 1959
A department store Santa Claus is threatened when he refuses to help in a robbery plan that was set up by his brother.
16	"Collector's Item"	John Brahm	Story by : Stanford Whitmore; Teleplay by : Stanford Whitmore & Richard Carr	December 31, 1959
Staccato investigates when a man kills his former girlfriend and then frames a jazz pianist for murder.
17	"The Man in the Pit"	Sidney Landfield	Jameson Brewer	January 7, 1960
A young man believes that a trumpet player is his father, who deserted the family years before, and attacks him with murder on his mind.
18	"The Only Witness"	Robert B. Sinclair	Robert L. Jacks	January 14, 1960
Staccato is hired to protect the younger sister of a racketeer, but when he arrives at the racketeer's apartment, he is shot and his client is found dead.
19	"Night of Jeopardy"	John Cassavetes	Story by : Everett Chambers; Teleplay by : Richard Carr & Everett Chambers	January 21, 1960
A counterfeiting ring that believes Staccato is in possession of their stolen plates gives him two hours in which to save his life.
20	"Double Feature"	Richard Whorf	Shimon Wincelberg	January 28, 1960
A dead ringer for Staccato murders the owner of a bowling alley and the young detective is accused.
21	"The List of Death"	Richard Whorf	Michael Fessier	February 4, 1960
A hunted criminal hires Staccato as a bodyguard and promises to turn himself over to police in exchange for letting him visit family members.
22	"Solomon"	John Cassavetes	Stanford Whitmore	February 11, 1960
A pacifist movement leader (Cloris Leachman) is accused of murdering her husband, which results in the woman's lawyer (Elisha Cook, Jr.) coming to Staccato for help.
23	"An Act of Terror"	John Brahm	Story by : Bernard C. Schoenfeld; Teleplay by : Bernard C. Schoenfeld & Richard Carr	February 18, 1960
Staccato hears a ventriloquist talking in his sleep and gets clues to the disappearance of the man's wife.
24	"An Angry Young Man"	Richard Whorf	Story by : Marian Cockrell; Teleplay by : James Landis	February 25, 1960
A mobster uses a bookstore as a front for fencing stolen gems until Staccato finds out about it.
25	"The Mask of Jason"	Paul Henried	Robert L. Jacks	March 3, 1960
Staccato is hired by a beauty pageant contestant (Mary Tyler Moore) to protect her from a disfigured man who keeps threatening her, but the man turns out to be her husband.
26	"A Nice Little Town"	Paul Henried	Stanford Whitmore	March 10, 1960
After a former soldier comes home after defecting to China, he is killed by a group of local vigilantes.
27	"Swinging Long Hair"	Jeffrey Hayden	Sam Gilman	March 17, 1960
Staccato is mistaken for a concert pianist who has come to the United States to avoid his repressive government.

== Production ==
Johnny Staccato replaced The Lawless Years, broadcast on Thursdays from 8:30 to 9 p.m. Eastern Time. Bristol-Myers and Salem cigarettes were alternate sponsors. William Frye was the executive producer, and Everett Chambers was the producer. Elmer Bernstein composed the music.

== Home media ==
Timeless Media Group released the complete series on DVD in Region 1 on October 12, 2010.

== In popular culture ==
- The show was later parodied on SCTV as Vic Arpeggio (portrayed by Joe Flaherty), a saxophonist/private investigator whose cases were usually solved by accident. Arpeggio claimed to have been “framed” for drug possession, and that the detective gig was merely a sideline until he got his solo career back on track.
- John Munch credits Staccato as his inspiration to become a detective in the Homicide: Life on the Street episode 'Kaddish'.
- Thomas Pynchon references Johnny Staccato in his 2009 novel Inherent Vice, set in late 1960s Los Angeles. Pynchon's main character, private investigator Larry "Doc" Sportello, praises Staccato as "the shamus of shamuses," ranking him with past greats Philip Marlowe and Sam Spade.
- The theme, performed by Elmer Bernstein, received little attention in the US, but went to #4 in Britain.
- Legendary artist Harvey Kurtzman parodied the show in his classic Jungle Book (Ballantine Books 1959) as "Thelonius Violence"
- The Colts Drum and Bugle Corps' 2015 show was called "...and a Shot Rings Out: A Johnny Staccato Murder Mystery", which was a reference to the TV show.
- The IDM group Meat Beat Manifesto sampled episode 11, The Poet, in the song “Radio Mellotron.”
- The show was referenced in 2024's "Music by John Williams" documentary, with a brief clip of Williams taking over for show star John Cassavetes on piano in a jazz combo.
