= The Road to the Wall =

1962 film

- Written by: Don Mankiewicz
- Produced by: Robert Saudek
- Narrated by: James Cagney
- Production company: Robert Saudek Associates
- Distributed by: Army Pictorial Service
- Release date: 1962
- Running time: 33 minutes
- Country: United States
- Language: English

The Road to the Wall is a 1962 American short documentary film produced by Robert Saudek about the construction of the Berlin Wall. It aired as an episode of the United States Army's television show, The Big Picture. It was nominated for an Academy Award for Best Documentary Short.

== See also ==
- List of American films of 1962
