= Pat Frank =

American novelist (1908–1964)

- Born: Harry Hart Frank Jr. May 5, 1907; Chicago, Illinois, US
- Died: October 12, 1964 (aged 57); Atlantic Beach, Florida, US
- Resting place: Oaklawn Cemetery, Jacksonville, FL
- Education: University of Florida
- Occupations: Journalist and author
- Children: Perry Frank; Patrick Gene Frank
- Writing career
- Notable works: Alas, Babylon, Mr. Adam

Harry Hart "Pat" Frank (May 5, 1907 – October 12, 1964) was an American newspaperman, writer, and government consultant. Perhaps the "first of the post-Hiroshima doomsday authors", his best known work is his post-apocalyptic novel Alas, Babylon (1959), which depicted the outbreak of a nuclear war and the struggles of its survivors in a small central Florida town.

== Journalism ==
Frank was born in Chicago in 1907. Named after his father who reportedly died of influenza while he was still young, Frank used and wrote under the nickname "Pat" throughout his life. He attended the Peddie School, a private prep school in New Jersey, then moved with his mother to her native northeastern Florida. Frank attended the University of Florida, took journalism courses and worked as a cub reporter for the Jacksonville Journal in Atlantic Beach, where his family had a beach house. In a self-told anecdote, because Atlantic Beach was short of news, Frank had reported everything of interest, and the job paid by the word, he invented a local wealthy family, regularly reported on their activities, and even managed to keep his job after the hoax was revealed. Frank went north in the late 1920s and wrote for the New York World and New York Evening Journal before moving on to the Washington Herald. But he again got bored by his beat, later describing it as follows:

I was in attendance at every major throat‐slitting, husband poisoning, and "I killed him because I loved him" episode on the Atlantic Seaboard, plus kidnappings, floods, the World Series and the opening days of Congress and at Pimlico. That sort of thing went on for years. Munich and marriage changed my interests, and I began to cover the War and Navy Departments, the State Department, and finally the White House.

Frank neglected to mention his reporting on politicians and bureaucrats in the Herald, subjects that persisted even as he pursued his new interests in war, diplomacy, and foreign places. When the European war began in 1939, he signed on as the new Washington correspondent for the Jewish Telegraphic Agency news service, then became Washington bureau chief for its new subsidiary, the Overseas News Agency (ONA). In 1941 he joined the predecessor of the Office of War Information and served as an OWI political warfare propagandist in Australia and Turkey. Ever restless, Frank then became a war correspondent for the ONA in Italy and covered postwar events in Austria, Hungary, and Germany.

== Novelist ==
In 1946 Frank published Mr Adam, a comic, satirical novel on the response of politicians, bureaucrats, and the media when it is discovered that only one man on Earth has survived sterilization after an accidental nuclear explosion destroys most of Mississippi. Frank's light-hearted look at a grim new topic sold more than two million copies and was published in over a dozen countries. On its proceeds Frank soon retired from newspaper reporting, returned to northeast Florida, and began a second career writing novels, short stories – he had had stories published since before the war – and freelance magazine pieces.

His second novel, An Affair of State (1948), a spy thriller set in Washington and Soviet-occupied Hungary, appeared just four months after the start of the Berlin Airlift that signaled for most Americans the onset of the Cold War. Its protagonist was an ex-serviceman bureaucrat, a junior Foreign Service officer assigned to set up a stay-behind network in Budapest, and the CIA reckoned that it was the first work of fiction to mention the agency. It was followed by Hold Back the Night (1951), a Korean War novel about a frontline Marine unit in which Frank, perhaps unwisely, applied his World War II experiences to a country and a war he had not yet seen. It nonetheless likely got Frank a stint in Korea to help the U.S. Government with a propaganda documentary and to set up a Korean film unit. He recounted his experiences in Florida and the Far East in an autobiographical travelogue, The Long Way Round (1953). For his next book, Frank returned to the thriller with Forbidden Area (1956), which featured the landing on a north Florida beach of a group of Soviet agents specially trained to pass as Americans. Their sabotage in preparation for an invasion leads to the brink of nuclear war.

That war arrived in Frank's most popular and enduring work, Alas, Babylon (1959). One of several contemporaneous novels treating nuclear war or its aftermath – Tomorrow!, On The Beach, Red Alert, Fail-Safe, A Canticle for Leibowitz – it recounts the war's outbreak and subsequent impact on Fort Repose, a small town in north-central Florida modeled on Mount Dora, near where Frank wrote the book. Part countdown-to-war drama, part survivalist tale, the book inspired numerous similar works and remains in print.

== Film and television ==
A film version of Hold Back the Night was released in 1956, and one of his short stories, "The Girl Who Almost Got Away", was the basis for Howard Hawks' 1964 comedy Man's Favorite Sport?. Forbidden Area was adapted by Rod Serling for the 1957 debut episode of the television anthology series Playhouse 90, directed by John Frankenheimer and starring Charlton Heston. The penultimate April 3, 1960, episode of Playhouse 90 featured Alas, Babylon, starring Don Murray and Dana Andrews. Several efforts to get it onto the big screen were unsuccessful.

Frank wrote the screenplay for the film We Shall Return (1963), a drama starring Cesar Romero as the patriarch of a Cuban refugee family newly arrived in Florida and their effort to organize a Bay of Pigs–type overthrow of the recently installed Castro regime.

== Politics and government ==
After his first two novels, critics were less kind to Frank's books. But if his later work got Frank pigeon-holed as a writer of "atomic potboilers", their popular success and topicality ultimately afforded their author opportunities inside government. A lifelong Democrat, he served as a speechwriter for the Democratic National Committee during the 1960 Kennedy campaign and after. In 1961 he received the American Heritage Foundation's Outstanding Citizenship Award in an era when it focused primarily on voter registration and civic participation. In 1961 he was a part-time consultant to the National Aeronautics and Space Council. Frank applied his experience with government and his investigatory and story-telling skills to How to Survive the H-Bomb ... and Why (1962), a book whose reading suggests a non-fiction version of his research for Alas! Babylon. Frank was critical of the Eisenhower civil defense bureaucracy in those books, but in How to Survive the H-Bomb he praised the recent changes made by the Kennedy Administration. In 1963 Frank joined the team: he helped organize information operations for the Office of Civil Defense and was later named its public information director, resigning just before his death to work on a new book.

During the 1964 Presidential race, Frank edited The Goldwater Cartoon Book, a collection of newspaper clips featuring the Republican candidate Barry Goldwater. Posthumously appeared Rendezvous at Midway: U.S.S. Yorktown and the Japanese carrier fleet (1967), an account and analysis of the 1942 battle jointly authored with U.S. Navy journalist Joseph D. Harrington.

Apparently a fast-living, fast-spending alcoholic during his second career, Frank died at age 57 of acute pancreatitis on October 12, 1964, in Atlantic Beach. He is buried at Oaklawn Cemetery, Jacksonville.

== Published works ==
- Mr. Adam (Philadelphia: J. B. Lippincott Company, 1946)
- An Affair of State (Philadelphia: J. B. Lippincott Company, 1948)
- Hold Back the Night (Philadelphia: J. B. Lippincott Company, 1951)
- The Long Way Round (Philadelphia: J. B. Lippincott Company, 1953)
- Forbidden Area (Philadelphia: J. B. Lippincott Company, 1956), also published as Seven Days to Never (London: Constable and Co, 1957)
- Alas, Babylon (Philadelphia: J. B. Lippincott Company, 1959)
- How to Survive the H-Bomb...and Why (Philadelphia: J. B. Lippincott Company, 1962)
- The Goldwater Cartoon Book (Editor). (National Publishing Company, Washington, DC, 1964)
- Rendezvous at Midway: U.S.S. Yorktown and the Japanese carrier fleet (with co-author Joseph D. Harrington)(New York: The John Day Company, 1967)

== See also ==
- Fallout shelter
- Retreat (survivalism)
- Survivalism
- United States civil defense
