= Omnibus (American TV program) =

American educational television series

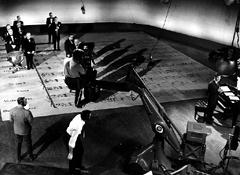
- Leonard Bernstein's debut appearance, 1954
- Genre: Variety
- Developed by: Robert Saudek and the Ford Foundation
- Directed by: Andrew McCullough (44 eps), Seymour Robbie (24), Charles S. Dubin (22), Bob Banner (16), Tad Danielewski (12), Elliot Silverstein (12), William A. Graham (10)
- Presented by: Alistair Cooke
- Country of origin: United States
- Original language: English
- No. of seasons: 8 or 9
- No. of episodes: 152

Production
- Production locations: CBS Studio 58 New York City, NY
- Running time: 90 min in first five seasons or 60–90 min in later seasons
- Production companies: Ford Foundation; Robert Saudek Associates

Original release
- Network: CBS (4 seasons, 1952–1956); ABC (1 season, 1956–1957); NBC (3 seasons, 1957–1961) or 4)
- Release: November 9, 1952 – April 16, 1961

Omnibus is an American, commercially sponsored, educational variety television series.

== History ==
Omnibus was created by the Ford Foundation, which sought to increase the education level of the American public. The show was conceived by James Webb Young who hired Robert Saudek as producer. Saudek believed that Omnibus could "raise the level of American taste" with educational entertainment.

The show was broadcast live, primarily on Sunday afternoons at 4:00pm EST, from November 9, 1952, until April 16, 1961. Omnibus originally aired on CBS, and later on Sunday evenings on ABC. The show was never commercially viable on its own, and sources of funding dwindled after the Ford Foundation ended its sponsorship in 1957. That year, the program moved to NBC, where it was irregularly scheduled until 1961. The show's first season had an audience of 4 million, which grew to 5.7 million at its peak in 1957. ABC aired a brief revival of the series in 1980-1981.

The series won more than 65 awards, including eight Emmy Awards (it was nominated for thirteen) and two Peabody Awards. The series is held at the Library of Congress and Global ImageWorks, among other archives. The Bernstein Omnibus programs were released in a 4-DVD set for Region 1 and Region 2 in 2010.

== Programming ==
The show, hosted by Alistair Cooke in his American television debut, featured diverse programming about science, the arts, and the humanities. The program featured original works by playwrights such as William Saroyan, interviews with public figures such as architect Frank Lloyd Wright, and performances by many of the most prominent entertainers of the day such as Jack Benny and Orson Welles. A heavily abridged version of Shakespeare's King Lear starring Orson Welles, staged by Peter Brook and directed by Andrew McCullough, was telecast on 18 October 1953 on CBS. Leonard Bernstein and Jonathan Winters made their first television appearances in the series. Bernstein gave his first televised music lectures on the program, and conducted one of the earliest telecasts of excerpts from Handel's Messiah on it. The best remembered episode featuring Bernstein was his first, transmitted on November 14, 1954: an analysis of Beethoven's Fifth Symphony in which the conductor demonstrated what the music might have been like if Beethoven had left some of his discarded music sketches in the symphony.

Hans Conried was featured in the 1958 episode "What Makes Opera Grand?", an analysis by Leonard Bernstein showing the powerful effect of music in opera. Conried played Marcello in a spoken dramatization of act 3 of Puccini's La bohème. The program demonstrated the effect of the music in La bohème by having actors speak portions of the libretto in English, followed by opera singers singing the same lines in the original Italian. Author Stuart Kallen, in his 2012 work, ' The History of American Pop ', (Greenhaven Publishing), claims that the show, in 1953, was the first American television programme to play a rock and roll record, '(Crazy Man Crazy)', by Bill Haley and His Comets. It was used in the soundtrack of ' Glory in the Flower ', starring James Dean.
