= Profiles in Courage (TV series) =

American historical anthology series

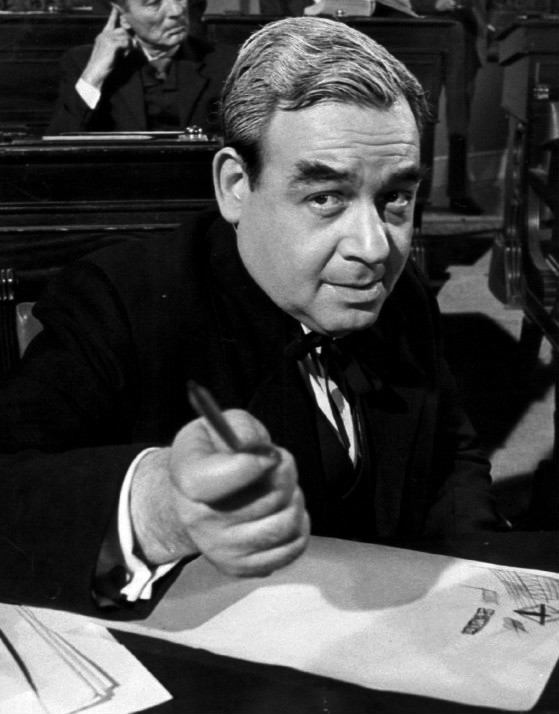
- Tom Bosley as George W. Norris, 1965
- Genre: Historical anthology
- Based on: Profiles in Courage by John F. Kennedy
- Directed by: Lamont Johnson; Daniel Petrie; José Quintero; Michael Ritchie; Alexander Singer
- Theme music composer: Nelson Riddle
- Country of origin: United States
- Original language: English

Production
- Executive producer: Robert Saudek
- Producer: Gordon Oliver
- Camera setup: Single-camera
- Running time: 44 mins.
- Production company: Robert Saudek Associates

Original release
- Network: NBC
- Release: November 8, 1964 – May 9, 1965

Profiles in Courage is an American historical anthology television series that was telecast weekly on NBC from November 8, 1964, to May 9, 1965 (Sundays, 6:30–7:30 p.m., Eastern and Pacific Time). The series is based on the Pulitzer Prize-winning book Profiles in Courage by President John F. Kennedy, who had been assassinated the previous November.

== Overview ==
The series lasts for 26 episodes, each of which features a figure from American history who took an unpopular stand during a critical moment in the nation's history. Seven of the eight senators profiled in Kennedy's 1956 book are profiled, with the sole exception being Mississippi's Lucius Quintus Cincinnatus Lamar.

Music for the opening and closing theme is arranged by Nelson Riddle, based on the Irish ballad The Boys of Wexford, home of Kennedy's ancestors.

Each episode ends with a recording of Kennedy's voice declaring that, "These stories of past courage can teach... they can offer hope... and they can provide inspiration. But they cannot supply courage itself. For this, each man must look into his own soul."

Among the 26 episodes, three teleplays profile women: Episode 2: high school teacher Mary S. McDowell in 1918; Episode 9: Puritan reformer Anne Hutchinson in 1637 (the earliest time frame depicted in any episode) and Episode 15: schoolteacher Prudence Crandall in 1832.

Hutchinson and Crandall (along with then-living former congresswoman Jeannette Rankin, a pacifist who voted against America's entry into World War I in 1917 and World War II in 1941 and died shortly before her 93rd birthday in 1973) were singled out by Kennedy as "Three Women of Courage", the article he wrote for the January 1958 issue of women's magazine McCall's

== Historical background ==
Episode #	Episode era and historical detail behind the individual profile in courage	Episode title (names in bold are subjects of chapters in Kennedy's book)	Year of birth	Year of death	Actor portrayal	Original airdate
1-1	**1924** Democratic National Convention#Ku Klux Klan presence — Alabama Senator Oscar Underwood opposes the Ku Klux Klan	Oscar W. Underwood	1862	1929	Sidney Blackmer	November 8, 1964
1-2	**1918** Brooklyn high school teacher Mary Stone McDowell#Her firing as a teacher for refusing to encourage her students' purchase of World War I Liberty Bonds	Mary S. McDowell	1876	1955	Rosemary Harris	November 15, 1964
1-3	**1850** Compromise — Missouri Senator Thomas Hart Benton#Later Senate career and tension	**Thomas Hart Benton**	1782	1858	Brian Keith	November 29, 1964
1-4	**1894** University of Wisconsin professor Richard T. Ely#Education and career in defense of academic freedom	Richard T. Ely	1854	1943	Dan O'Herlihy	December 6, 1964
1-5	**1861** Texas in the American Civil War#Governor Sam Houston refuses to sanction Texas' secession from the Union	**Sam Houston**	1793	1863	J. D. Cannon	December 13, 1964
1-6	**1915** Leo Frank#Commutation of sentence by Georgia Governor John Slaton	John M. Slaton	1866	1955	Walter Matthau	December 20, 1964
1-7	**1770** defense attorney and future President John Adams#Counsel for the British: Boston Massacre	John Adams	1735	1826	David McCallum	December 27, 1964
1-8	**1946** Ohio Senator Robert A. Taft#Condemnation of Nuremberg Trials	**Robert A. Taft**	1889	1953	Lee Tracy	January 3, 1965
1-9	**1637** Massachusetts Bay Colony Antinomian Controversy — Boston midwife and Puritan religious reformer Anne Hutchinson	Anne Hutchinson	1591	1643	Wendy Hiller	January 10, 1965
1-10	**1838** Missouri Militia Brigadier General Alexander William Doniphan#The 1838 Mormon War	Alexander William Doniphan	1808	1887	Peter Lawford	January 17, 1965
1-11	**1893** Haymarket affair#Pardon and historical characterization — Illinois Governor John Peter Altgeld	John Peter Altgeld	1847	1902	Burgess Meredith	January 24, 1965
1-12	**1843** escaped slave Frederick Douglass#Abolitionist and preacher risks recapture into slavery	Frederick Douglass	1817	1895	Robert Hooks	January 31, 1965
1-13	**1850** Compromise — Massachusetts Senator Daniel Webster#Taylor administration, 1849–1850	**Daniel Webster**	1782	1852	Martin Gabel	February 7, 1965
1-14	**1916** President Woodrow Wilson Supreme Court candidates#Louis Brandeis nomination	Woodrow Wilson	1856	1924	Whit Bissell	February 14, 1965
1-15	**1832** Canterbury Female Boarding School#Trials of Prudence Crandall, Connecticut schoolteacher and activist for education of black girls	Prudence Crandall	1803	1890	Janice Rule	February 21, 1965
1-16	**1860** Tennessee Senator and future President Andrew Johnson#Secession crisis	Andrew Johnson	1808	1875	Walter Matthau	February 28, 1965
1-17	**1869** President Ulysses S. Grant's Secretary of State Hamilton Fish#Cuban belligerency and insurrection 1869–1870	Hamilton Fish	1808	1893	Henry Jones	March 7, 1965
1-18	**1920** Socialist Party of America#Expulsion of Socialists from the New York Assembly — Charles Evans Hughes#Presidential candidate	Charles Evans Hughes	1862	1948	Kent Smith	March 14, 1965
1-19	**1868** Kansas Senator Edmund G. Ross#Andrew Johnson impeachment deciding vote	**Edmund G. Ross**	1826	1907	Bradford Dillman	March 21, 1965
1-20	**1917** American entry into World War I#Declaration of war — Nebraska Senator George W. Norris#Senator leads filibuster against Armed Ships Bill	**George W. Norris**	1861	1944	Tom Bosley	March 28, 1965
1-21	**1887** Grover Cleveland#Vetoes pension bills — Grand Army of the Republic#History	Grover Cleveland	1837	1908	Carroll O'Connor	April 4, 1965
1-22	**1807** John Quincy Adams#U.S. Senator from Massachusetts — support for Embargo Act of 1807	**John Quincy Adams**	1767	1848	Douglas Campbell	April 11, 1965
1-23	**1807** Burr conspiracy#Trial — Supreme Court Chief Justice John Marshall#Burr conspiracy trial	John Marshall	1755	1835	Gary Merrill	April 18, 1965
1-24	**1906** Denver judge and social reformer Ben B. Lindsey#Juvenile court advocacy	Benjamin Barr Lindsey	1869	1943	George Grizzard	April 25, 1965
1-25	**1787** Founding Father from Virginia George Mason#Road to dissent and refusal to sign the Constitution until it contained a Bill of Rights	George Mason	1725	1792	Laurence Naismith	May 2, 1965
1-26	**1847** Ohio Senator Thomas Corwin#Political career delivers a speech in opposition to the Mexican War	Thomas Corwin	1794	1865	George Rose	May 9, 1965

== Episodes ==
No. overall	No. in season	Title	Directed by	Written by	Original release date
1	1	"OSCAR W. UNDERWOOD"	Lamont Johnson	David Karp	November 8, 1964
Opening narration: "...contender for the presidency. Another contender — Senator Oscar W. Underwood of Alabama — was so convinced the Klan was contrary to all principles of democracy that he wanted the Convention to denounce the Klan in no uncertain terms. His political courage would be tested during that fateful summer of nineteen-twenty-four.": Starring Sidney Blackmer as Oscar W. Underwood; and Victor Jory as Charles Carlin; "WALDORF–ASTORIA HOTEL 1924" "BIRMINGHAM, ALABAMA October, 1924"; Closing narration: "Oscar Wilder Underwood, United States Senator from Alabama, paid a high price for his act of courage — he not only lost the Democratic presidential nomination... but he also lost his renomination for the Senate. He forfeited his political career in fighting the bigotry of the Ku Klux Klan.": W. J. Bryan. . . . . . . . . . . . . .Tol Avery Forney Johnston. .Lamont Johnson Klan Leader. . . . . . . . . . .Paul Genge Joe Larsen. . . . . . . . .Walter Mathews; Georgia Delegate. .Garry Walberg Younger Delegate . Berkeley Harris Gov. Brandon. .Woodrow Parfrey Owen. . . . . . . . . . . . . .Len Weyland Ed Moore. .Arthur Peterson Jr.; Lady Supporter. . .Betty Harford Chairman. . . . . .Frederick Downs Colby. . . . . . . . . . .Jason Wingreen Homer Cummings. .Charles Irving Pattangall. . . . . . . . .Robert Cinder McAdoo Man. . . . . .Griffith James; Reporter. . . . . . . . . . . .Robert Ball Reporter. . . . . . .William Lanteau Reporter. . . . . . . .Frank Killmond Reporter. . . . . . . . . . .Ollie O'Toole Servant. . . . . . . . . . .Chester Jones and Henry Beckman as Graham MacNamee
2	2	"MARY S. McDOWELL"	Jose Quintero	Peter S. Feibleman	November 15, 1964
"BROOKLYN, NEW YORK; April 17, 1917"; Opening narration: "It was twelve days after America had entered World War One. The country was at once filled with patriotism in its fight for democracy and with outrage against the German aggression. Emotions were running high and, before this year was to end, Mary S. McDowell, a Brooklyn schoolteacher, would test her courage against the public pressures of the nation.": Starring Rosemary Harris as Mary S. McDowell; "BROOKLYN April 17, 1917" "BROOKLYN MANUAL TRAINING HIGH SCHOOL" "BROOKLYN MANUAL TRAINING HIGH SCHOOL May 12, 1917"; Closing narration: "The decision was upheld. Mary McDowell risked her career to express freedom of conscience at a time when few were doing so. Six years later, she was reinstated by the Board of Superintendents which admitted it... might have made a mistake. Without anger or bitterness, Mary resumed her duties as a Latin teacher." "The use of this additional story of a courageous American was approved by President Kennedy for this series.": Also starring Audrey Christie as Mrs. McDowell; Albert Salmi as Schneider; Co-starring Ralph Williams as Fred Simpson Frances Sternhagen as Lili Koeller Rae Allen as Miss Darvon; Katherine Squire as Mrs. Simpson Woodrow Parfrey as Principal Ralson George Mitchell as Mr. Broomell; Reporter ......... Jason Wingreen Quaker Woman ..... Mary Gregory Mr. Wilson ............. Ken Drake Mrs. Wilson ..... Maggie McCarter Miss Wilkes ............. Jo Helton
3	3	"THOMAS HART BENTON"	Lamont Johnson	A. J. Russell	November 29, 1964
Starring Brian Keith; "U.S. SENATE, 1850"; Narration: "Great crises produce great men... and great deeds of courage. United States has known no greater crisis than that which culminated in the fratricidal war between North and South. The old Senate chamber was the cockpit in which the struggle was fought to preserve the Union. To those who sought compromises which would postpone or remove entirely the shadow of war which hung over them, the decision was agonizing. For the ultimate choice involved the breaking of old loyalties and friendships and the prospect of humiliating political defeat. Such a man was Senator Thomas Hart Benton of Missouri." "SENATE DINING ROOM" "MISSOURI, 1850" "WASHINGTON, D.C. November 28, 1850"; Closing narration: "He died seven years later, still fighting for the things he believed. But his voice from the past on behalf of the Union was one of the deciding factors that prevented Missouri from yielding to all the desperate efforts to drive her into Secession along with her sister slave states. Even in death and defeat, Thomas Hart Benton was victorious.": Co-starring Geraldine McEwan as Jessie Benton Fremont; Also starring Russell Collins as Senator Foote Carl Benton Reid as Senator John C. Calhoun; Sen. Atchison.......Len Wayland Sen. John Frémont..........Lamont Johnson Prince Sevigne..........William Lanteau Mr. Blair.......Richard Bull Joseph...............Bill Walker John Lynch............Jason Wingreen Eliza Benton.........Meg Wyllie; Newspaperman..............John Newton Col. Aycock..........Gene Darfler Pres. of Senate......Jim Boles Mr. Basserman.........Jim Maloney Mr. Folsom....Lyle Fox Sen. Dodge...............Ralph Deloach Henry.............Napoleon Whiting A Man......Elmer Modlin
4	4	"Richard T. Ely"	Michael O'Herlihy	Walter Bernstein	December 6, 1964
starring Dan O'Herlihy
5	5	"Sam Houston"	Sherman Marks	A. J. Russell	December 13, 1964
starring J. D. Cannon
6	6	"Governor John M. Slaton"	Robert Gist	Don Mankiewicz	December 20, 1964
Starring Walter Matthau
7	7	"JOHN ADAMS"	Robert Stevens	Walter Bernstein	December 27, 1964
Opening narration: "The British sentry was startled by the alarm of a fire that did not exist. Whoever had instigated this prank, confusion it caused was a prolog to other events that same night... events later to be known as the Boston Massacre.": Starring David McCallum; "In the early months of seventeen-seventy, British soldiers were stationed in Boston for the first time. Their purpose — to enforce the English revenue laws in the colony. The colonials considered military occupation one of many grievances. Some colonials banded together in rebellious groups, such as the Sons of Liberty. The colonials were further angered by this sign, posted on the night of March fifth, which purported to announce the Redcoats' determination to repulse any opposition. Sometimes this opposition took the form of children's pranks and sometimes it was the harassment of individuals." "A disorderly mob was growing in the streets next. Trouble was brewing. John Adams, then a young successful lawyer and a militant foe of the English crown, was to be faced with decisions that could have ended his political career." "JOHN ADAMS HOME March 6, 1770" "SUPERIOR COURT, BOSTON November 27, 1770" "SUPERIOR COURT, BOSTON December 4, 1770"; Closing narration: "John Adams risked his whole career in defending the soldiers. In spite of his unpopular stand, he was elected to the General Court. He became one of the great public figures of America — one of the original signers of the Declaration of Independence. He became the second President of the United States.": Also starring Andrew Prine as Josiah Quincy; Co-starring Torin Thatcher as Jonathan Sewall Gene Lyons as Sam Adams; Phyllis Love as Abigail Adams Russell Collins as Dr. Joseph Warren; Master Appleton.......Scott Lane Montgomery..........John McLiam Samuel Quincy..........Paul Comi Governor Hutchinson...Ben Wright Killroy...............Jeff Cooper Bridgham............Whit Bissell James Forrest..Hedley Mattingly Langford.........Brendan Dillon Clerk of Court..Barry Macollum Dr. Jeffries...........Tom Palmer; Jared..............Les Brown, Jr. Crosswell..........Julian Burton Mr. Davis, Jr......Barton Heyman Hinkling.........Russell Horton Hemmingway....Robert Sorrells Thayer...............Joe Di Reda Strong.............James Wixted Samuel Gray......Jason Wingreen Foreman...........Ashley Cowan; Uncredited: Percy Helton as Mr. Wilson, witness testifying at trial
8	8	"ROBERT A. TAFT"	Jose Quintero	William Hanley	January 3, 1965
Opening narration: "Not all men were joyful, however... not all were capable of celebration.... nor had remaining to them the capacity for joy. Those who survived the charnel pit that was Nazi Germany, survived a new kind of war — a war of enslavement, murder, extermination, genocide... and the victims of that war fell on this battlefield — death from controlled gas warfare... in numbers beyond the ability of the mind to grasp. But who can truly imagine six million dead? The brain becomes useless and it remains to the heart and the soul to contend with such a truth. And what of the men responsible for the Holocaust? Were they men, like you and me? Perhaps... Not supermen... ordinary men... ordinary, but in whose hands there had been power... that it required little more than a single year to compile and catalog and broadcast to the world from this courtroom in Nuremberg, Germany, the full terrible truth of the system that these men had dreamed of... in a nightmare dream to be the Thousand-Year Reich and that was ended in twelve. The fire of madness that burned in these men's souls and consumed them and they stood now on the edge of judgment. While in America in that September of nineteen-forty-six, the people were preparing for a far different kind of judgment — in the first peacetime elections in eight years. There was a man then in Washington who was directly involved in the one judgment that would hopefully result in the political dominance of his party in the United States Congress... and who felt a responsibility for the nature of the other judgment that would in all likelihood result in the deaths of the men in the Nuremberg dock. Shy, reticent, solitary man, with few intimate friends, but with many followers. A man who had reached a place of power in the United States Senate... the acknowledged leader of his party. In the few years since his arrival in Washington in nineteen-thirty-nine as senator from his native state of Ohio... called Mister Republican... the son of the twenty-seventh President of the United States and with the dream that was almost a conviction... that he himself would one day have the honor of holding that office. But he was soon to risk the loss of his place of eminence in American domestic politics. And, he was to risk, too, the condemnation of the American people. Both, because he was a man who refused to make any slightest compromise with what he believed to be the truth." "WASHINGTON May 1946": Starring Lee Tracy as Senator Robert A. Taft; Closing narration: "The storm raised by Senator Taft's speech eventually died down. It did not, after all the uproar, appear to affect the Republican sweep in nineteen-forty-six nor was it, at least openly, an issue in Taft's drive for the presidential nomination in nineteen-forty-eight. Taft's action was characteristic of the man who was labeled a reactionary and who was proud to be a conservative and who showed unhesitating courage in standing against the flow of public opinion for a cause that he believed to be right.": Also starring David Opatoshu as Max Goldman; Co-Starring Lou Frizzell as Howard Jensen George Furth as Stanley Sue Randall as Joan Owens; Featuring Martha Taft ...... Louise Lorimer Tom Smith ........... Steve Ihnat Senator Wilks ...... Eugene Roche Editor ........... Jason Wingreen Reporter ......... Tommy Farrell Reporter .............. Lee Millar Reporter .......... Robert Casper Reporter ......... Frank Behrens; and Loring Smith as Roger Marsden
9	9	"Anne Hutchinson"	Cyril Ritchard	Jonathan Miller	January 10, 1965
Starring Wendy Hiller
10	10	"General Alexander William Doniphan"	Unknown	Don Mankiewicz	January 17, 1965
Starring Peter Lawford
11	11	"John Peter Altgeld"	Daniel Petrie	Philip S. Goodman	January 24, 1965
Starring Burgess Meredith
12	12	"FREDERICK DOUGLASS"	Sherman Marks	Don M. Mankiewicz	January 31, 1965
"NEW BEDFORD MASSACHUSETTS 1838"; Opening narration: "This is Frederick Douglass, age twenty-one, newly arrived from Baltimore. Certain things are second nature, even in a strange town — such as stepping down to let a white man pass... perhaps such deference is unnecessary, but Douglass is unsure of Northern ways." "This man, Frederick Douglass, on his way home with a bundle of wood, will soon bring distinction to a name not his own. He would find himself with greater opportunities than he had ever imagined, but first he would have to face great risks, public and personal, as well as the greatest risk — doing damage to the cause he serves.: Starring Robert Hooks as Frederick Douglass; "NEW BEDFORD MASSACHUSETTS 1841"; Closing narration: "Frederick Douglass had to flee to England to escape recapture as a fugitive slave. There, he made speeches for his cause and, eventually, friends in England bought Douglass from his master, Captain Auld of Baltimore. As a freed man, he returned to the United States and served his country in many ways. He recruited Negro soldiers for the Union Army. He was an advisor to President Lincoln and, in eighteen-eighty-nine, he was appointed the United States minister to Haiti.": Also Starring Claudia McNeil as Mrs. Haines Harry Townes as Will Coffin; Alfred Ryder as William Lloyd Garrison Hari Rhodes as Nathan Johnson; And Also starring Frederick O'Neal as Mr. Haines Richard Rust as Wendell Phillips; Co-Starring James Edwards as Ruggles Mittie Lawrence as Anna Douglass; Featuring Mrs. Everett ......... Lillian Bronson Mrs. Johnson .............. Isabelle Cooley Dock Boss .......... Ray Teal Willie ......... Joel Fluellen Billings .............. Jack Doner Storekeeper .......... Arthur Peterson
13	13	"DANIEL WEBSTER"	Robert Gist	A. J. Russell	February 7, 1965
"LONG ISLAND 1849"; Opening narration: "The contemporary called Daniel Webster a living lie — because no man on Earth could be so great as he looked. Certainly, his striking appearance was half the secret of his power — he convinced all who looked upon his face that he was one born to rule men. There can be no mistaking he was a great man — he looked like one, he talked like one and he insisted he was one. Ever since his first speech in Congress, attacking the War of 1812, Webster riveted the House of Representatives as no freshman had ever held it before. He was the outstanding orator of all time — whether at a picnic, as an advocate before the Supreme Court or... in the Senate. Webster first was elected to the Senate in eighteen-twenty-seven. He soon became a strong voice against the institution of slavery, characterizing it as... one of the greatest evils, both moral and political. He presented petitions for the abolition of the slave trade in the District of Columbia, he served as Secretary of State and returned to his seat in the Senate to face the crisis of impending Civil War. When the moment came to test his greatness, Daniel Webster had to risk everything that he held dear." "WASHINGTON, D.C. 1850": Starring Martin Gabel; Closing narration: "Daniel Webster suffered many abuses for his stand for the Union and his own political ambitions were thwarted. But, the fact that Secession did not occur until ten years later, is due in great part to him. He helped the country understand and accept Henry Clay's Compromise.": Also starring Martine Bartlett as Caroline Webster Sandy Kenyon as Fletcher Webster; Co-starring Robert F. Simon as Henry Clay Malcolm Atterbury as Timothy Felson Carl Benton Reid as John C. Calhoun; Slave Dealer .... Woodrow Parfrey Emerson .......... Booth Colman Senator Seward .... Morris Ankrum Garrison ............. G. B. Atwater; Klinger ............. John Holland John Greenleaf Whittier .. Ken Drake Rev. Theodore Parker ... David Bond Senator Walker ....... Tyler McVey Millard Fillmore .......... Jim Boles Slave ............ Robert Murphy
14	14	"WOODROW WILSON (episode title does not appear on-screen)"	Alexander Singer	David Karp	February 14, 1965
"January 4, 1916"; Opening narration: "During nineteen-fifteen, Europe was at war. German U-boats were sinking British passenger ships. The Lusitania was sunk with two thousand people aboard, including one hundred and twenty four American citizens. The United States was neutral and enjoying a prosperous peacetime. In December of nineteen-fifteen, President Woodrow Wilson married Edith Galt. On his return to the White House, he not only had to face the problems of the foreign crisis, but he was to create a domestic crisis that was to last for months." "Woodrow Wilson — former economist, former president of Princeton University and, for the preceding three years, President of the United States — must fill a vacancy in the Supreme Court. His choice would indeed produce a shockwave throughout the nation." "The White House kitchen": Starring Whit Bissell as Woodrow Wilson; "THE DETROIT FREE PRESS on the appointment of Louis Brandeis January 29, 1916..." "..THE BOSTON TRANSCRIPT.." "..HARVARD UNIVERSITY President A. Lawrence Lowell.." "BOSTON, May 1916" "On May twentieth, nineteen sixteen, President Wilson was aboard a train for Charlotte, North Carolina. On the same train was Wilson's friend Josephus Daniels, assigned to talk to Lee Overman, a crucial member of the Senate committee voting on the Brandeis appointment." "Shortly after Wilson's return from Charlotte, the second crucial member of the Senate committee, Senator James O'Gorman paid a surprise call to the White House office." "One man held the deciding vote in the Senate committee — Senator Shields of Tennessee." "May 24, 1916" "On June first, the Senate voted on the committee's recommendation to confirm the nomination by a vote of forty-seven to twenty-two. Closing narration: "On Monday, June fifth, nineteen-sixteen, Louis Dembitz Brandeis appeared for the first time on the bench of the United States Supreme Court as an associate justice. The record of his service in that court is public and distinguished, bearing on every hope that his friends expressed throughout the long fight to confirm his appointment. The hero of Justice Brandeis' elevation to that bench was the twenty-eighth President of the United States Woodrow Wilson who had risked his career, his administration and his re-election — first to summon forward a great jurist and then to support him when every force — friendly and hostile — was bent on making Wilson retreat. Woodrow Wilson's refusal to retreat was an act for which every American — every person who loves justice — may be proud.": Also Starring John McMartin as Tumulty; William Daniels as Attorney General Gregory; Special Guest Appearance Paul Stewart as Louis D. Brandeis; Co-Starring Philip Ober as George Anderson John Hoyt as Senator Henry Cabot Lodge Oliver McGowan as Senator Overman; Featuring Irish Cook ....... Keith McConnell French Cook ..... Maurice Marsac Swedish Cook ...... Robert Easton Mrs. Jaffray ............. Reta Shaw Waiter .............. Nick Stewart; Sen. Hoke Smith ... Donald Foster Senator Shields ......... Ken Drake Josephus Daniels ...... Duke Farley Governor Stuart ... Robert Carson Senator Culberson ....... John Rust Reporter ........... William Phipps Stock Exchange Executive . Vic Perrin Clerk of Court ....... Don Dillaway; And Peter Whitney as Senator O'Gorman
15	15	"Prudence Crandall"	Andrew Singer	Andy Lewis	February 21, 1965
Starring Janice Rule
16	16	"Andrew Johnson"	Alexander Singer	Philip S. Goodman	February 28, 1965
Starring Walter Matthau
17	17	"Hamilton Fish"	Unknown	Unknown	March 7, 1965
Starring Henry Jones
18	18	"Charles Evans Hughes"	Unknown	David Karp	March 14, 1965
Starring Kent Smith
19	19	"EDMUND G. ROSS"	Gerald Mayer	Andy Lewis	March 21, 1965
"OFFICE OF THE SECRETARY OF WAR EDWIN STANTON"; Opening narration: "This was a test case of the rights and power of the presidency against the rights and power of Congress. President Andrew Johnson was attempting to replace his own Secretary of War Edwin Stanton. Congress had passed a law which forbade it without the Senate's consent. Johnson held that the law was unconstitutional. He wanted it brought to a test. It was, but not in the form he'd expected. And it would have ended in disaster if it were not for United States Senator whose name none recall... Edmund G. Ross." "The battleground for the impeachment of President Andrew Johnson was the United States Senate. And the warriors were some of the most powerful men in the Reconstruction period. Against Johnson... Benjamin Butler, Charles Sumner, Thaddeus Stevens and Samuel Pomeroy. Among those for Johnson, John Henderson and Lyman Trumbull. But the trial would be decided by one man who was still undecided... Senator Edmund Ross.": Starring Bradford Dillman as Edmund G. Ross; "There were eleven articles of impeachment against President Johnson. He was charged with illegally removing Stanton from office... and with abusing Congress. But the real issue was a hidden one... could the Congress dominate the President? The independent power of Andrew Johnson as President of the United States was being challenged by the Republican majority in Congress. Johnson's trial got underway on March fifth eighteen-sixty-eight... and it began with every prospect of a conviction." "ROSS'S APARTMENT April 1868" "Final arguments in the trial of President Andrew Johnson were begun on April twenty-second. Senate voting on his guilt or innocence was scheduled to begin five weeks later. Prosecution was optimistic... the President's defense counsel was not." "MAY 15, 1868"; U.S. SENATE May 16, 1868; Closing narration: "On May sixteenth eighteen-sixty-eight, seven Republican senators stood against party and majority to acquit President Andrew Johnson from impeachment... Fessenden of Maine, Fowler of Tennessee, Van Winkle of West Virginia, Trumbull of Illinois, Henderson of Missouri, Grimes of Iowa, Ross of Kansas. None of them was elected to the Senate again. It was years later that their position was vindicated when the Tenure of Office Act was declared unconstitutional by the United States Supreme Court. Ross' vote ended his political career. When he returned to Kansas in eighteen-seventy-one, he and his family suffered public abuse, physical attack and poverty.": Also starring Barry Morse as Thaddeus Stevens; Simon Oakland as Perry Fuller James Westerfield as Sam Pomeroy; Co-starring Kent Smith as Senator Sumner Cyril Delevanti as Senator Grimes Arlene Martel as Vinnie; Judge Newton.......Alan Baxter General Thomas..........Ted de Corsia Butler..........Stafford Repp Stanton.........Ray Teal Stanbery...............Len Wayland Henderson............Sidney Clute Trumbull.........Tyler McVey Sgt. at arms.........Richard Bull Chase........John Graham Senate Clerk...........Ollie O'Toole; Special Guest Star Herschel Bernardi as General Sickles
20	20	"George W. Norris"	Unknown	Don Mankiewicz	March 28, 1965
Starring Tom Bosley
21	21	"Grover Cleveland"	Lamont Johnson	Philip S. Goodman	April 4, 1965
Starring Carroll O'Connor
22	22	"John Quincy Adams"	Michael Ritchie	Andy Lewis	April 11, 1965
Starring Douglas Campbell
23	23	"John Marshall"	Unknown	David Karp	April 18, 1965
Starring Gary Merrill
24	24	"Judge Benjamin Barr Lindsey"	Robert Gist	Don Mankiewicz	April 25, 1965
Starring George Grizzard
25	25	"George Mason"	Joseph Anthony	A. J. Russell	May 2, 1965
Starring Laurence Naismith
26	26	"Thomas Corwin"	Michael Ritchie	Don Mankiewicz	May 9, 1965
Starring George Rose

== Awards ==
The series won two awards; a Peabody Award for Robert Saudek and a Directors Guild of America Award for Outstanding Directorial Achievement in Television.
