= Operation Blue Jay =

1953 film

Operation Blue Jay was the code name for the construction of Thule Air Base, which is now known as Pituffik Space Base in Greenland. It started as a secret project, but was made public in September 1952 through Life Magazine. Blue Jay brought 7,000 construction workers to build the secret cold war base. The project built a three-kilometer long runway to service large B-36 Peacemaker and B-47 Stratojet bombers.

== Documentary ==
Operation Blue Jay
- Production company: United States Army Signal Corps
- Release date: 1953
- Country: United States
- Language: English

Operation Blue Jay is a 1953 American short documentary film about the project. Master Sergeant Lester A. Marks was the sole cinematographer for this film when he worked for the US Signal Corps. It aired on television on the series The Big Picture.

The film was nominated for an Academy Award for Best Documentary Short.
