= Forbidden Area =

- First edition (publ. J. B. Lippincott Company); Cover art by Ed Valigursky
- Author: Pat Frank
- Language: English
- Publisher: J. B. Lippincott Company
- Publication date: 1956
- OCLC: 599677
- LC Class: PZ3.F84974 Fo

Forbidden Area is a 1956 Cold War thriller novel by Pat Frank. Its plot involves Soviet sleeper agents intended to sabotage the U.S. war effort, who have been trained by classical conditioning to have an American "cover identity" that they can remember as well as their own.

Frank was asked to write a book about a Russian invasion. He said he was inspired by German troops landing in Florida in World War Two.

It was published in a magazine in serialized form as Seven Days to Never.

The New York Times said it "isn't exciting at all".

TV rights were bought by Martin Manulis.

== 1956 TV adaptation ==
In October 1956, CBS broadcast an adaptation of the novel as the first episode of its Playhouse 90 series.

== Other proposed versions ==
CBS had an option to purchase the film rights.

In 1963, it was announced Irving Asher and Ely Landau would turn the novel into a film. The film version was not produced.

== See also ==
- Telefon (film)
