= Mary Stone McDowell =

Quaker teacher and conscientious objector (1876–1955)

Mary Stone McDowell (22 March 1876 – 6 December 1955) was a Quaker teacher who, in a celebrated case, was fired from her job for refusing to ask her students to purchase war bonds.

== Early life ==
McDowell was a birthright member of the New York Monthly Meeting of the Society of Friends, or Quakers. She graduated Phi Beta Kappa from Swarthmore College in 1896 and was the class commencement speaker. She later earned a master's degree in classical languages and education, and began teaching in 1900.

== Pacifism controversy ==
On 13 March 1918, McDowell was dismissed as a Latin teacher at Manual Training High School in Brooklyn, New York. She was charged with "conduct unbecoming a teacher", or, more specifically, that "she repeatedly refused to sign loyalty pledges circulated among the teachers and refused to take part in Red Cross work and Liberty Bond sales". Before the war, McDowell had gotten high praise (e.g. "In every way the best", "could not be better") in her evaluations from the school administrators.

During the school administration hearing of her case, she was asked: "Are you willing to assist the Government at the present time by every means in your power in carrying on the present war?", to which she answered: "No."

Many Quakers, like McDowell, have conscientious objections to taking oaths and to participating in war. Schoolchildren were at the time being encouraged to buy "Thrift Stamps"—a sort of junior version of the Liberty Bonds the U.S. government was using to fund its participation in World War I.

After a hearing and some deliberation, McDowell's dismissal was upheld by the school administration by a unanimous vote on 19 June 1918.

McDowell was one of a number of teachers who were dismissed on similar grounds, but she was unusual for her decision to challenge her dismissal in court (New York State Supreme Court). The court turned down her argument that she had been unfairly dismissed on religious grounds, and the State Commissioner of Education also refused to reverse her dismissal.

=== Responses ===
The New York Times editorialized that the McDowell case proved that Quakers (a.k.a. "Friends") and other pacifists ought not to be allowed to teach children.

It becomes the Friends to retire from and to keep out of positions which in their very nature involved the declaration and teaching of patriotism as it is understood by a majority of human beings so large that its members have a right to consider themselves normal and everybody else abnormal. For these reasons it seems to us that a Friend, at this time, is distinctly out of place as a teacher in a public school – that if well advised such a teacher will resign, and that if not docile to good counsel, he or she, as the case may be, should be dismissed.

In July 1923 the school board that had dismissed McDowell apologized for its action and officially reinstated her, saying:

After full consideration of the case, the committee has decided that the punishment meted out to Miss McDowell was too severe. She was tried at a time of great public hysteria.

In 1964, a television series by the name "Profiles in Courage" made McDowell the subject of its second episode, focusing on how she maintained her convictions through this ordeal.

== Her later career ==
McDowell returned to teaching, and eventually to Manual Training High School, where she worked from 1923 to 1931 after her reinstatement. She also later worked with the Fellowship of Reconciliation and War Resisters League. In the years leading up to World War II she helped found the Pacifist Teachers League, believing that such an organization would have been helpful to her in her struggle.

McDowell was one of the founders of Peacemakers, a group that promoted war tax resistance. In 1954 she wrote, in a letter to the Internal Revenue Service:

I believe that war is wicked and contrary to our democratic faith… and it is also contrary to our Christian faith which teaches us to overcome evil with good. Moreover, in the atomic age and in an interdependent world, even victorious war could only bring disaster to our own country as well as others. War preparations and threats of atomic war cannot give us security. True patriotism calls for world-wide cooperation for human welfare and immediate steps toward universal disarmament through the United Nations. Accordingly, I still refuse to pay the 70% of the tax which I calculate is the proportion of the tax used for present and future wars. The portion used for civilian welfare I am glad to pay.

She would typically donate the portion of the taxes she refused to give to the government to the American Friends Service Committee. The I.R.S. would respond by seizing the resisted amount from her teacher's pension.

== Legacy ==
The Mary McDowell Friends School in Brooklyn is named in her honor.
