= The Big Picture (American TV series) =

American documentary television program

Example of a traditional introduction to The Big Picture (Army Newsreel No. 1, TV-390)

The Big Picture is an American documentary television program which aired from 1951 to 1964. The series consisted of documentary films produced by the United States Army Signal Corps, Army Pictorial Service.

== Production ==
Master Sergeant Stuart A. Queen (center), host of The Big Picture for its first eight years, shakes hands with his successor on the series, Master Sergeant Neil S. Robinson (1961).

The series was conceived by Albert Gannaway Jr and David Burkey, a former television producer who served with the Signal Corps in the Korean War. They saw it as a way to use film footage accumulated by the Army Pictorial Service, packaged in a way that would be attractive to commercial television. The first series of 13 episodes was broadcast on CBS in late 1951, with each episode about an aspect of the Korean War. It had a positive reception from audiences and the Army decided to expand the scope as a publicity tool. Army information units from around the world suggested topics with the Signal Corps filming all the segments. Topics varied and included military history, contemporary weaponry, training exercises, cooperation with allied forces, and Army sporting activities.

The half-hour weekly program was filmed on the Astoria stages, now Kaufman Astoria Studios, which is a historic movie studio located in the Astoria section of the New York City borough of Queens. The host was Army Master Sergeant Stuart Queen (1919–1981), a World War II veteran and Korean War combat broadcaster. Though Queen is referred to as both a host and narrator, he essentially introduced and linked segments that were narrated by others. Narrators for filmed segments included Audie Murphy, Lorne Greene, Robert Mitchum, Alexander Scourby, Walter Cronkite, Raymond Massey, and Ronald Reagan. In the 1950s, the series was shot on 35mm black-and-white negative, but by the 1960s it was using 16mm color negative.

It was eventually aired on 366 television stations on the CBS, ABC and DuMont networks and ran for 828 episodes. While the series, as a regularly produced and scheduled program, nominally ended in 1964, further episodes continued to be made on an irregular basis until 1971. In addition to the various network schedulings between 1951 and 1964, the show was also widely syndicated, and it continued to air in syndication until 1971.

As an official work of the United States government, The Big Picture was never eligible for copyright and has always been in the public domain, thus allowing it to be distributed far and wide without restriction. The National Archives and Records Administration has made individual episodes of The Big Picture available via Amazon and the Internet Archive, where they can be downloaded for free. Episode DVDs can also be copied for free by visitors to NARA's College Park, Maryland, facility. Many complete episodes and clips have been posted on YouTube.

== List of episodes ==
- TV 169 – The First Forty Days in Korea
- TV 170 – The Turning of the Tide
- TV 171 – The United Nations Offensive
- TV 172 – Chinese Reds Enter the War

Excerpt of TV 172 "Chinese Reds Enter the War"

- TV 173 – United Nations Forces Escape the Chinese Trap
- TV 174 – United Nations Consolidate Below the 38th Parallel
- TV 175 – United Nations Forces Push the Chinese Back
- TV 176 – The United Nations Offensive Continues
- TV 177 – The UN Forces Cross the 38th Parallel
- TV 178 – The Reds Launch Their Expected Spring Offensive
- TV 179 – United Nations Forces Counterattack
- TV 180 – The Korean Cease-Fire Talks Begin
- TV 181 – The UN Line is Stabilized While Truce Talks Continue
- TV 182 – The Mission of the Army
- TV 183 – The Army Combat Team
- TV 184 – The Citizen Soldier
- TV 185 – The Combat Soldier
- TV 186 – Duty, Honor, Country
- TV 187 – The Army Reserve Team
- TV 188 – Army Aviation
- TV 189 – The Army Medical Corps
- TV 190 – The Army Chaplains
- TV 191 – Women in the Army
- TV 192 – The Eyes and Ears of the Army
- TV 193 – Enough and On Time
- TV 194 – Citizen, Soldier and Taxpayer, Too
- TV 196 – A Day in Korea
- TV 198 – Information and Education Overseas (Part One)
- TV 199 – We Never Stop
- TV 200 – Army Language School

Excerpt of TV 200 "Army Language School"

- TV 201 – Civil Assistance, Korea
- TV 202 – Pictorial Report No. 1
- TV 203 – Follow Me
- TV 204 – The Citizen Soldier
- TV 204 – Army Transportation Corps
- TV 205 – All American

Excerpt of TV 205 "All American"

- TV 206 – Truth is Our Defense
- TV 207 – Pictorial Report No. 2 – A variety of subjects covered by our cameras both in Korea and in the United States. Included are: The story of a Quartermaster Aerial Supply Company, and the story of the 8209 Mobile Army Surgical Hospital.
- TV 208 – Tools for a Modern Army
- TV 209 – (Not Used in BIG PICTURE Series)
- TV 210 – The Big Red One
- TV 211 – The Work Horse of the Western Front (30th Infantry Division)
- TV 212 – The 1st Cavalry Division and the 41st Infantry Division
- TV 213 – D-Day Convoy to Normandy
- TV 214 – The 6th Infantry Division
- TV 215 – The Red Bull Attacks
- TV 216 – All-American (82nd Airborne Division)
- TV 217 – The Famous Third Army
- TV 218 – Blood and Bullets
- TV 219 – Naples to Cassino
- TV 220 – Invasion of Southern France
- TV 221 – The 7th Infantry Division
- TV 222 – 29th Infantry Division
- TV 223 – Third Korean Winter
- TV 224 – Seventh Army
- TV 225 – Fire Power – Artillery
- TV 226 – Special Services
- TV 227 – Operation Blue Jay
- TV 228 – Ranger Ready

Excerpt of TV 228 "Ranger Ready"

- TV 229 – Double Duty American – Reserves
- TV 230 – Alaska
- TV 231 – Report from the Provost Marshal General
- TV 232 – Soldier in Berlin
- TV 233 – Armored Force
- TV 234 – Army Aviation
- TV 235 – Korean Wind-Up
- TV 236 – Pictorial Report No. 3 – Around the world in 30 minutes – showing military police activities in Europe, helicopter activities in the Far East and the latest in training methods within the Zone of Interior.
- TV 237 – Hawaiian Defense
- TV 238 – Soldier in Europe
- TV 239 – The Soldier Patient
- TV 240 – Pictorial Report No. 4 – The report features three segments: the history, traditions and opportunities of Army Bands; Eta Jima Specialist School in Japan, the largest school of its kind, with details on training for court reporting, chemical warfare decontamination, radio operators, telephone linemen, heavy equipment mechanics and operators, and napalm and flame thrower use; and, post-Armistice aid to Korean people, with distribution of shipments of food and clothing on the fifth anniversary of South Korea's independence.
- TV 241 – The Republic of Korea (ROK) Soldier
- TV 242 – Atrocities in Korea
- TV 244 – Christmas in Korea – 1953
- TV 245 – Guided Missiles
- TV 246 – A Second Life
- TV 247 – The Quartermaster in Europe
- TV 248 – Sports for All
- TV 249 – This is Aberdeen
- TV 250 – Olympics
- TV 251 – Pictorial Report No. 5
- TV 252 – The Alaskan Scout and Alaskan Command
- TV 253 – Pictorial Report No. 6
- TV 254 – Japan, Our Far East Partner
- TV 255 – Rebirth of Seoul
- TV 256 – The Steel Ring
- TV 257 – Engineer Mission
- TV 258 – This is First Army
- TV 259 – This is Second Army
- TV 260 – This is Third Army
- TV 261 – This is Fourth Army
- TV 262 – This is Fifth Army
- TV 263 – This is Sixth Army
- TV 264 – Pictorial Report No. 7
- TV 265 – TV in the Army
- TV 266 – Exercise Flash Burn
- TV 267 – NATO: Partners in Peace
- TV 268 – Okinawa, Keystone of the Pacific
- TV 269 – Soldier in Austria
- TV 270 – Battlefields of Yesterday
- TV 271 – Armed Forces Assistance to Korea
- TV 272 – Pictorial Report No. 8
- TV 273 – Ice Cap
- TV 274 – Fifteen Forty-Five Hours
- TV 275 – Military District of Washington
- TV 276 – Commence Firing
- TV 277 – The WAC is a Soldier, Too
- TV 278 – Pictorial Report No. 9
- TV 279 – Education in the Army
- TV 280 – Airborne to Battle

Excerpt of TV 280 "Airborne to Battle"

- TV 281 – Soldier in Britain
- TV 282 – Army Technical Schools in Europe
- TV 283 – Soldier in Panama
- TV 284 – The Lodge Act Soldier
- TV 285 – Defense of Japan
- TV 286 – Pictorial Report No. 10
- TV 287 – Nerves of the Army
- TV 288 – Time to Go
- TV 289 – The 24th Infantry Division in Korea
- TV 290 – Nurses in the Army
- TV 291 – NATO Maneuvers (1954)
- TV 292 – Birth of a Tank
- TV 293 – Aid to Nationalist China
- TV 294 – The 25th Infantry Division in Korea
- TV 295 – Ordnance in Europe
- TV 296 – The 1st Cavalry Division in Korea
- TV 297 – The 2nd Infantry Division in Korea
- TV 298 – Airborne Medic
- TV 299 – Pictorial Report No. 11
- TV 300 – Role of the Army
- TV 304 – Pictorial Report No. 12
- TV 305 – Pan American Games
- TV 312 – Army Information School
- TV 315 – Army Talent
- TV 322 – Pictorial Report No. 17 – This report features Army application of technological developments: Army stevedores train on a model ship; the Corps of Engineers' Beach Erosion Board studies erosion with the world's largest wave tank; visitors to Ft. Huachuca see a launch of the RC-71 Reconnaissance Drone, a 12-foot, 350-pound, remote-controlled aircraft that carries Signal Corps film cameras to deliver reconnaissance within an hour; the Corps of Engineers builds Army housing on the Greenland ice cap; the work of a chaplain's assistant; and, a day in the live of a parachute repairman.
- TV 325 – Military Police Town Patrol — YouTube video of this episode
- TV 326 – Division in Europe
- TV 328 – Soldier in France
- TV 333 – Pictorial Report No. 21 – A visit to the fabled land of Siam and a personal visit with Army Chief of Staff General Maxwell Taylor.
- TV 348 – Historic Fort Monroe
- TV 350 – Pictorial Report No. 25
- TV 353 – Pictorial Report No. 26 – "THE BIG PICTURE" to cover Virginia township centennial and modern miracles of military science – For the first story in this pictorial report, the camera frames a picture of Fort Huachuca, Arizona, one of the most modern of all the Army's installations. Here in this desolate country, surrounded by empty desert and mountains, the Army has found an ideal proving ground for newly developed electronic equipment. Viewers will see the testing of an amazing reconnaissance robot, the pilotless plane – the drone; the newly developed radio contained in an infantryman's helmet and used under combat conditions; and the new all-weather flight control – a system of seeing in the dark. Fort Huachuca is a miracle testing ground, where 8,000 men and women are working to find new ways of protecting America. The second story is truly "off beat" for THE BIG PICTURE series. It concerns the farming community of Galax in Southern Virginia. Here is a township on the eve of its Centennial Jubilee volunteering its help through a Chamber of Commerce committee to form an Army Reserve training company that could march in the Centennial parade. It is a warm-hearted story of a people determined to keep American democracy safe. For they know that freedom is everybody's business – and prove it on THE BIG PICTURE.

Excerpt of TV 353 "Electronic Proving Grounds, Fort Huachuca"

- TV 354 – You In Japan
- TV 357 – Army Ballistic Missile Agency
- TV 358 – Pictorial Report No. 27
- TV 359 – DEW Line
- TV 360 – Defense Against Enemy Propaganda
- TV 371 – Mister Army
- TV 372 – Pictorial Report No. 29

Excerpt of TV 372, "Special Operations Amphibious Training"

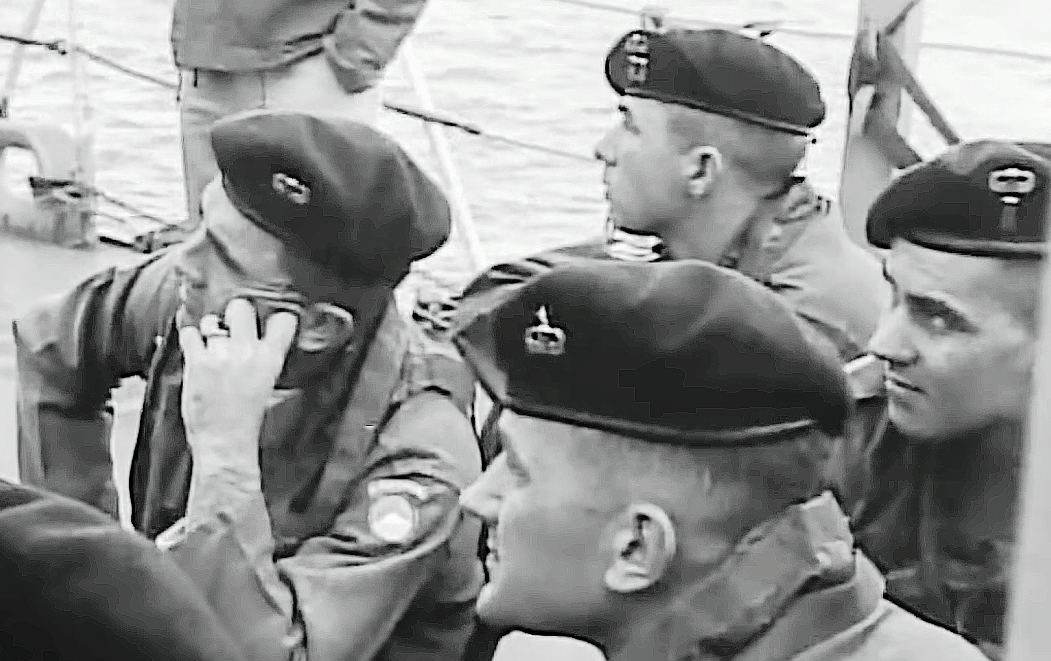
Screenshot from TV-372 of a Special Forces Detachment training with the U.S. Navy off the coast of Okinawa

- TV 373 – Preamble to Peace
- TV 374 – Provide for the Common Defense (JOCO)
- TV 375 – Alexandria – City of Understanding
- TV 376 – Pictorial Report No. 30
- TV 377 – Brush Fire – Korea
- TV 378 – Southern European Task Force (SETAF)
- TV 379 – Pictorial Report No. 31
- TV 380 – 42nd Rainbow Division
- TV 381 – What Makes a General
- TV 382 – The History of Cavalry
- TV 383 – Engineer Supply Mission
- TV 384 – Missile Man
- TV 385 – Our Sons
- TV 386 – Many Roads to Glory
- TV 387 – Ottumwa, U.S.
- TV 388 – 42nd Field Artillery Group
- TV 389 – Armored Combat Power
- UNNUMBERED RELEASE – Operation Life Line
- TV 390 – Army Newsreel No. 1
- TV 391 – Graduate – R.O.T.C.
- TV 392 – Pictorial Report No. 32
- TV 393 – Individual Protection Against Atomic Attack
- TV 394 – Pentomic Army
- TV 395 – Special Services (USAREUR)
- TV 396 – Atomic Battlefield
- TV 397 – Army Satellites
- TV 398 – The General Bradley Story
- TV 399 – Your Defense
- TV 400 – Far East MAAGS
- TV 401 – Fire Brigade
- TV 402 – Why NATO
- TV 403 – Southeast Asia Treaty Organization
- TV 404 – Missiles on Target
- TV 405 – (Not Used in BIG PICTURE Series)
- TV 406 – Battle of Salerno
- TV 407 – Religious Emphasis Day in Philadelphia
- TV 408 – The General Marshall Story
- TV 409 – Army Newsreel No. 2
- TV 410 – First Sergeant
- TV 411 – Aerial Mobility
- TV 412 – Soldiers’ Heritage
- TV 413 – Battle of the Bulge
- TV 414 – Salute to the Canadian Army
- TV 415 – Story of a Squad
- TV 416 – The General MacArthur Story
- TV 417 – Battle of Manila
- TV 418 – Seven-Year-End Report
- TV 419 – Pictorial Report No. 33
- TV 420 – A Debt is Honored
- TV 421 – Pentomic Seventh Army
- TV 422 – Alaska – The Outpost State
- TV 423 – Okinawa – Bastion of the Pacific
- TV 424 – USMAAG Germany
- TV 425 – The Stilwell Story
- TV 426 – Flying Soldiers
- TV 427 – The Patrol
- TV 428 – Code of the Fighting Man
- TV 429 – Character Guidance
- TV 430 – People to People
- TV 431 – Battle of San Pietro
- TV 432 – Thayer of West Point
- TV 433 – The Common Defense
- TV 434 – Canine College
- TV 435 – The Eisenhower Story
- TV 436 – The Admiral Nimitz Story
- TV 437 – The General Hap Arnold Story
- TV 438 – The Unseen Weapon (CBR)
- TV 439 – Nike-Hercules – A Reality
- TV 440 – The Quartermaster Story
- TV 441 – Battle for New Guinea
- TV 442 – This is Fort Monmouth
- TV 443 – West Point Summer Cadet Training
- TV 444 – The General Pershing Story
- TV 445 – Summer Storm
- TV 446 – Winter War
- TV 447 – War's End
- TV 448 – Phantom Fighters (10th Special Forces)

TV 448 "Phantom Fighters"

- TV 449 – A Sharper Sword and Stronger Shield
- TV 450 – Airborne Soldier
- TV 451 – Korea Today
- TV 542 – Look Toward Tomorrow
- TV 453 – History of the Signal Corps
- TV 454 – Washington Soldier
- TV 455 – Germany Today
- TV 456 – Operation Discovery
- TV 457 – Army Medicine
- TV 458 – History of Firepower
- TV 459 – The Joe Mann Story
- TV 460 – Signal Soldiers
- TV 461 – Operation Danville
- TV 462 – The Army – A Deterrent to Aggression
- TV 463 – Army Digest No. 1
- TV 464 – One Army
- TV 465 – The Army's “First”
- TV 466 – Army Digest No. 2
- TV 467 – USO Wherever They Go
- TV 468 – The General Patton Story
- TV 469 – Ranger – Mark of a Man
- TV 470 – Tularosa Frontier
- TV 471 – Top Soldier
- TV 472 – The Seventh Army Story
- TV 473 – Project Man
- TV 474 – I Am the Guard
- TV 475 – Arms for Tomorrow
- TV 476 – The American Way of Life
- TV 477 – Operation Cartwheel
- TV 478 – Old Glory
- TV 479 – Army Digest No. 3
- TV 480 – Payoff in the Pacific (Part One)
- TV 481 – Payoff in the Pacific (Part Two)
- TV 482 – The Story of Stars and Stripes
- TV 483 – Army Digest No. 4
- TV 484 – Battle of North Africa (Part One)
- TV 485 – Battle of North Africa (Part Two)
- TV 486 – They Were There
- TV 487 – Army Digest No. 5
- TV 488 – Big Picture Highlights
- TV 489 – Eighth Army – Shield of the Free World
- TV 490 – Army Digest No. 6
- TV 491 – Decade of NATO
- TV 492 – U. S. Army Language School
- TV 493 – Dateline: West Berlin
- TV 494 – Operation Lead Dog
- TV 495 – Mouth-Mouth Resuscitation
- TV 496 – History of Maneuvers
- TV 497 – (Not Used in BIG PICTURE Series)
- TV 498 – (Not Used in BIG PICTURE Series)
- TV 499 – (Not Used in BIG PICTURE Series)
- TV 500 – (Not Used in BIG PICTURE Series)
- TV 501 – (Not Used in BIG PICTURE Series)
- TV 502 – History of Aviation (Part One)
- TV 503 – History of Aviation (Part Two)
- TV 504 – History of Aviation (Part Three)
- TV 505 – Partners in Progress
- TV 506 – Breakout and Pursuit (B&W – 1961) Story of "Operation Cobra" in World War II, in which American forces broke through Normandy and began their push across Europe.
- TV 507 – STRAC Fourth
- TV 508 – Broken Bridge
- TV 509 – Role of Armor
- TV 510 – Special Digest
- TV 511 – Army Digest No. 8
- TV 512 – Challenge of Ideas
- TV 513 – Infantry Operations
- TV 514 – City Under the Ice
- TV 515 – West Point – Education for Leadership (B&W – 1961) Life at West Point – scholastic profile of faculty – and cadets, athletic program, discipline, recreational, and social aspects.
- TV 516 – The Army Nurse
- TV 517 – The Military Police Story (B&W – 1961) Military Police history and present day training at Fort Gordon, Georgia – physical conditioning, specialized skills and techniques, and laboratory work.
- TV 518 – Silent Warriors

Excerpt of TV 518 "Silent Warriors"

- TV 519 – Korea and You
- TV 520 – U. S. Army and the Boy Scouts
- TV 521 – OCS Fort Sill
- TV 522 – Global Frontiers
- TV 523 – The Army's Music Men (B&W – 1961) A visit to the U.S. Army Band, at Fort Myer, Virginia – Presentation of musical selections from World War I to contemporary tunes.
- TV 524 – CDEC
- SPECIAL – Christmas Story
- TV 525 – U. S. Army Cold Weather and Mountain School
- TV 526 – Army Digest No. 9
- TV 527 – Patrolling
- TV 528 – Caribbean Command
- TV 529 – Military Assistance Program (Part One)
- TV 530 – U.S. Army in Berlin: Timetable for Crisis (Part One) (B&W – 1962) Role of U.S. Army in Berlin from VE Day 1945 to the critical summer of 1961 during the Berlin crisis – companion film to TV 536.
- TV 531 – Exercise Swiftstrike
- TV 532 – The Chaplain and the Commander
- TV 533 – Prelude to Taps
- TV 534 – The Eagle's Talon
- TV 535 – Military Assistance Advisory Group: Iran
- TV 536 – U.S. Army in Berlin: Checkpoint Charlie (Part Two) (B&W – 1962) Companion film to TV 530 – picks up the report on Berlin, the divided city, in the critical summer of 1961.
- TV 537 – Operation Readiness
- TV 538 – The Army Chaplain – Yesterday and Today
- TV 539 – This is the Infantry
- TV 540 – Opportunity to Learn
- TV 541 – The USAREUR Story (Part One)
- TV 542 – The USAREUR Story (Part Two)
- TV 543 – Top of the World
- TV 544 – Solid Punch
- TV 545 – This is Our Strength
- TV 546 – The Famous Fourth
- TV 547 – Special Forces – Guest narrator Henry Fonda

Excerpt of TV 547 "Special Forces"

- TV 548 – Military Assistance Program (Part Two)
- TV 549 – America on the Move
- TV 550 – Patterns of History
- TV 551 – Strike Command
- TV 552 – Soldier Statesman
- TV 553 – This Is How It Is
- TV 554 – Sky Divers

Excerpt of TV 554 "Sky Divers"

- TV 555 – The Aggressor – "The Aggressors," a giant training aid of the United States Army, was formed after World War II at Fort Riley, Kansas. Their job: to create as realistic a maneuver enemy as possible so that combat training will approach the feeling of actual combat. In the first half of this most unusual THE BIG PICTURE, audiences discover the Aggressor Amy, Member Circle Trigon Party, have liberated large areas of the continental United States, but because of their success, THE BIG PICTURE viewers have been kept from the facts. This is a short documentary showing the liberation of the United States to date. After setting the pace for this program in the first 15 minutes, the camera examines closely this gigantic training aid of the Army. It is explained that at the close of World War II, a board of 100 combat-experienced American generals was formed to recommend training policies for the future. Out of these recommendations came the Aggressor concept of a maneuver enemy. The general mission of the Aggressor Army was threefold: First, to provide a realistic enemy for maneuver training; second, to provide realistic situations for intelligence training; third, to make sure that all American soldiers are aware that any future enemy will look and act differently from what they are accustomed to. See also TV 362.
- TV 556 – Mobility
- TV 557 – To Keep and Bear Arms
- TV 558 – Take Command
- TV 559 – The catalog lists two titles as TV 559:
  - USARPAC
  - Climb to Glory (Part One) (B&W – 1963) Story of the 10th Mountain Division in Italy, and how it succeeded in breaking the Gothic Line, touted as invincible by the Nazi leaders.
- TV 560 – Road to the Wall
- TV 561 – Guerrilla, U.S.
- TV 562 – Hidden War in Vietnam
- TV 563 – Testing for Tomorrow
- TV 564 – Alert – CONARC (Part One)
- TV 565 – Men in Training – CONARC (Part Two)
- TV 566 – Dragon's Teeth (B&W – 1963) General J. Lawton Collins tells of the fight to take the Siegfried line in World War II and of the campaign to cross onto the soil of Germany.
- TV 567 – The Soldier is Tops (B&W – 1963) Report on impact, of technological, physical, and special requirements of today's fighting man, his selection and training.
- TV 568 – The Army's All-Americans
- TV 569 – Salute to the Navy
- TV 570 – COMZ
- TV 571 – Tools for Learning
- TV 572 – Command Decision: The Invasion of Southern France (B&W – 1963) Story of "Operation Dragoon" in World War II – Roosevelt, Churchill, Chiang Kai-Shek, and Stalin are featured.
- TV 575 – Beyond the Call – Part I (The Medal of Honor) (B&W – 1963) Cites acts of valor of American servicemen from Revolutionary era through the Mexican War.
- TV 576 – Beyond the Call – Part II (The Medal of Honor) (B&W – 1963) Continues with review of servicemen's bravery during World War I, World War II and Korean War – tradition of bravery stressed to prevent war in this era.
- TV 577 – Recall
- TV 578 – The Third Challenge: Unconventional Warfare
- TV 579 – Beachhead: Anzio (B&W – 1963) Documents the establishment of an allied beachhead at Anzio in World War II.
- TV 580 – Pentagon Report
- TV 581 – Salute to MATS
- TV 582 – Shape of the Nation
- TV 583 – AFN – The American Forces Network
- TV 584 – Alaskan Scout (B&W – 1963) Features activity of Eskimo scouts in the Alaska National Guard as they operate from fishing village of Shishmaref, near Arctic Circle.
- TV 585 – Special Forces Advisor

TV 585 "Special Forces Advisor"

- TV 586A – At a Moment's Notice
- TV 586B – Salute to the Air Force
- TV 587 – Fortress in the Sea (B&W – 1963) Story of recapture of Corregidor in World War II by General MacArthur's force – includes recollections of army nurse, paratrooper, commander, and army sergeant.
- TV 588 – Famous Generals – Pershing (B&W – 1963) Military highlights of "Blackjack Pershing’s career, from prior to turn of century through World War I, including his retirement days.
- TV 589 – Famous Generals – MacArthur (B&W – 1963) Career of General MacArthur, with focus on World War II action in the Pacific, post-war era in Japan, and early days of fighting in Korea.
- TV 590 – The Big Picture – Famous Generals – Eisenhower (B&W – 28 min – 1963) General Eisenhower's career with the military is traced from West Point to World War II – does not cover his service as President of the US.
- TV 591 – Famous Generals – Bradley (B&W – 28 min – 1963) Story of General Omar Bradley – traces his early years and schooling as well as his rise to top rank in World War II his military career.
- TV 592 – Famous Generals – Marshall (B&W – 28 min – 1963) Career of General George C. Marshall, including his post-military assignment as secretary of state.
- TV 593 – A Nation Sings (B&W – 1963) A musical remembrance of Civil War tunes, featuring U.S. Army Band and chorus, and civilian vocalists.
- TV 594 – Famous Generals – Patton (B&W – 1963) Military career of the colorful General George S. Patton, with focus on his World War II action in Africa and Europe.
- TV 595 – Famous Generals – Arnold (B&W – 1963) General "Hap" Arnold's career during World War II, which is also the story of the growth of the present-day Air Force.
- TV 596 – Famous Generals – Stilwell (B&W – 1963) Military career of "Vinegar Joe" Stilwell in the Far East during World War II.
- TV 597 – Prelude to Taps (Color – 1964) Tribute to American soldier in the form of Army drills, ceremonial and pageant as performed by 3d U.S. Infantry at Ft. McNair, Washington, D.C.
- TV 598 – Operation Amigo
- TV 599 – Climb to Glory (Part One)
- TV 600 – Climb to Glory (Part Two) (B&W – 1963) The final break-through by the 10th Mountain Division in its relentless push toward final victory in Italy in World War II.
- TV 601 – Paris 44 (B&W – 1964) The recapture of Paris in 1944, and how the allies saved it from mass destruction by the occupation forces of the Nazi regime.
- TV 602 – The Measure of Our Defense
- TV 603 – I Am A Soldier
- TV 604 – Mapping Adventure
- TV 605 – U. S. Army Advisor in Vietnam
- TV 606 – Seventh Army – Checkmate to Aggression
- TV 607 – Operation Montagnard
- TV 608 – Point of the Spear
- TV 609 – R.O.T.C. – A Pattern for Progress
- TV 610 – An Army Moves (B&W – 1964) History of Army mobility from Revolutionary era to present day, with focus on logistical and transportation progress in the 20th century, and future mobility needs.
- TV 611 – Soldiers in Greasepaint (B&W – 1964) Story of entertainers who traveled wherever the military were in World War II to bring them a laugh and a reminder of home.
- TV 612 – AEF in Siberia (B&W – 1964) Vignette of the expeditionary force which visited Russia following World War I – their mission and activities while in the USSR.
- TV 613 – Pershing Joins the Ranks
- TV 614 – Battalion Commander
- TV 615 – D-Day
- TV 616 – Thailand
- TV 617 – Partners in Freedom
- TV 618 – Third Army
- TV 619 – One Week in October (Cuban Missile Crisis)
- TV 620 – Traditions and Achievements (B&W – 1964) Story of the valor and determination of the citizen soldier to preserve the American ideal of freedom from Revolutionary times to Korean War.
- TV 621 – Salute to the US Coast Guard
- TV 622 – Medal of Honor
- TV 623 – How Sleep the Brave (Color – 1965) History of Arlington National Cemetery and a tribute to the American statesmen and fighting men who gave their full measure for the nation.
- TV 624 – Thayer of West Point (B&W – 1964) Story of Sylvanus Thayer and how he transformed the military academy into an institution known for its history of molding great leaders.
- TV 625 – Old Glory (B&W – 1964) A tribute to our flag – How it has been an inspiration to the American fighting man since it proudly carried its thirteen original stars.
- TV 627 – American Soldier
- TV 628 – NATO: Background to Berlin
- TV 629 – Wings At The Tree Tops (US Armed Helicopters)
- TV 631 – Iran
- TV 632 – NATO: The Changed Face of Europe
- TV 633 – American on the Move
- TV 634 – Army in Action – Episode I – The Winds of Change (B&W – 1964) U.S. Army posture during first quarter of 20th century – World War I buildup, peacetime demobilization, and life in U.S. during the 20s and 30s.
- TV 635 – Army in Action – Episode II – The Three Faces of Evil (B&W – 1964) Post World War I: Rise of Mussolini and Hitler, Japan's aggression in China, Ethiopian War, Spanish Civil War, and effects of depression in U.S.
- TV 636 – Army in Action – Episode III – Flames on the Horizon (B&W – 1964) World events 1939–1941: War in China, early phases of World War II in Europe, fall of France, U.S. mobilization, and Japan's attack on Pearl Harbor.
- TV 637 – Army in Action – Episode IV – The Spreading Holocaust (B&W – 1965) Military events in 1941 and 1942, with particular focus on U.S. involvement in the Pacific, Europe, and North Africa.
- TV 638 – Army in Action – Episode V – The Slumbering Giant Awakes (B&W – 1965) U.S. logistical and tactical operations in 1943 in North Africa, Pacific, Aleutians, New Guinea, and Europe, up to invasion of Sicily.
- TV 639 – Army in Action – Episode VI – Global War (B&W – 1965) Conduct of War in 1943 on European and Pacific fronts – allied advance in Sicily, New Guinea, Russia, Italy, and Pacific Islands.
- TV 640 – Army in Action – Episode VII – The Tide Turns (B&W – 1965) Conduct of war in 1944 – allied advance in Italy, France, and Belgium – Liberation of Paris, and advance into Germany.
- TV 641 – Army in Action – Episode VIII – The Victory (B&W – 1965) Events leading to German surrender, May 1945 – demise of Hitler and Mussolini – liberation of Philippines, and final surrender of Japan, September 1945.
- TV 642 – Army in Action – Episode IX – The Years Between (B&W – 1963) Post War Events 1945–1949; U.S. rehabilitation of Japan and Germany, Russia's expansion in Europe, Indo-China and Greek Wars, and Berlin blockade.
- TV 643 – Army in Action – Episode X – The Cobra Strikes (B&W – 1965) Events leading to Korean War, conduct of the war from 1950 to 1953, and cessation of hostilities in July 1953.
- TV 645 – Army in Action (Years of Menace)
- TV 646 – Army in Action (The Finest Tradition)
- TV 647 – A Pictorial History of the U.S. Cavalry (B&W – 1964) Military service of U.S. Cavalry throughout the nation's history, with focus on its changed combat role since World War I as an effective infantry unit.
- TV 648 – Battle of St. Vith – Part I (B&W – 1965) Background of events on Hitler's Ardennes offensive December 1944, with focus on December 19 attack on St. Vith, marking beginning of Battle of the Bulge.
- TV 649 – Battle of St. Vith – Part II (B&W – 1965) Story of the three-day attack on St. Vith and retreat of American Troops when the town was lost to the Germans.
- TV 650 – Tried by Fire – Part I (B&W – 1965) Role of 84th Infantry Division in fighting German Army in World War II – Penetration of Siegfried line November 1944, and move into Belgium in December 1944.
- TV 651 – Tried By Fire I) (B&W – 1963) Fighting by 84th Infantry Division in the Battle of the Bulge, crossing of the Roer and Rhine, and the desperate race to the Elbe.
- TV 652 – Prologue to Leadership
- TV 653 – A Soldier's Warranty
- TV 654 – Action Vietnam
- TV 655 – Teheran, Iran
- TV 656 – Operation Scoreboard
- TV 657 – Catalog lists two different titles for TV 657:
  - Exercise Desert Strike
  - Bridge at Remagen – Part I (B&W – 1963) Events surrounding capture of bridge at Remagen by American troops, March 7, 1945, giving U.S. forces the first bridgehead on the Rhine.
- TV 658 – Bridge at Remagen – Part II (B&W – 1963) Capture of bridge and subsequent tactical events – military gain of the capture is assessed with regard to ensuing conduct of the war in Europe.
- TV 659 – Tigers on the Loose – Part I (B&W – 1965) Combat story of 10th Armored Division in World War II, with focus on events related to fighting around Metz and Bastogne.
- TV 660 – Tigers on the Loose – Part II (B&W – 1963) Combat story of 10th Armored Division continued – fighting in Bastogne and ensuing events during push to Brenner Pass (From December 1944 to April 1945).
- TV 662 – Drill Sergeant
- TV 663 – Berlin Duty
- TV 664 – Icecap (B&W – 1965) U.S. research and accomplishments on Greenland Icecap, with focus on work of armed forces since 1950 – stress on military and policing importance of area.
- TV 665 – Assignment Taiwan
- TV 666 – EOD (Explosive Ordinance Disposal)
- TV 667 – The Army Nurse – Soldier of Mercy
- TV 668 – Science Moves The Army
- TV 669 – United States Strike Command
- TV 670 – Alaskan Earthquake (B&W – 1966) Story of the 1964 Alaska earthquake and its tragic effects – the story of the post-disaster effort to rehabilitate the land and its people.
- TV 671 – Army Medical Research
- TV 672 – Your Army Reports
- TV 673 – M-60: King of Armor
- TV 674 – Why Vietnam
- TV 675 – Your Military Neighbor (B&W – 1966) How US Armed Forces achieve good community relations by promoting the public welfare here and abroad, under normal and emergency conditions.
- TV 676 – Your Army Reports
- TV 677 – Your Army Reports
- TV 678 – Your Army Reports
- TV 679 – Army Missions Unlimited
- TV 680 – The Unique War (Vietnam War)
- TV 681 – The Army in Taiwan
- TV 682 – Not For Conquest
- TV 683 – Lifeline
- TV 684 – Our Heritage (B&W – 1966) Our heritage of freedom as enunciated in the Declaration of Independence and brought to life for posterity by the founding fathers – military efforts of the nation to preserve these concepts from the Revolutionary era to the present.
- TV 685 – Your Army Reports

Excerpt of TV 685 "Your Army Reports–HALO Training"

- TV 686 – U.S. Army in the Andes

Excerpt of TV 686 "U.S. Army in the Andes"

- TV 687 – Firepower for Freedom (Color – 1966) History and present day work on research and development of modern firepower, with focus on missions of: Picatinny Arsenal, Frankford Arsenal, Edgewood Arsenal, and the Army Procurement and Supply Agency.
- TV 688 – Something to Build On
- TV 689 – Your Army Reports
- TV 690 – Of Soldiers and Altars (Color – 1966) Extensive religious activities and facilities provided by U.S. Army chaplaincy in CONUS and overseas for members of the Army and their dependents, of all faiths.
- TV 691 – Chopper Pilot (Claws For The Eagle) (Color – 1967) Training of helicopter pilots: preflight and flight training provided by the warrant officer candidate program at Ft Wolters, Texas; and advanced training at the Army Aviation Center, Ft Rucker, Alabama.
- TV 692 – Your Army Reports
- TV 693 – The Red Diamond (Color – 1967) Story of the 5th Infantry Division (Mechanized), known as "The Red Diamond” – individual and unit training at Ft. Carson, Division Headquarters, and capabilities of each component of the division.
- TV 695 – A Nation Builds Under Fire (Host Narrator John Wayne)
- TV 696 – Your Army Reports
- TV 697 – USO Wherever They Go (Color – 1967) Story of the worldwide activities of the USO since its inception in World War II, and its impact on the morale of the serviceman.
- TV 698 – Alaskan Centennial (Color – 1967) Story of Alaska – its purchase and development by the United States – present day Alaska – role and mission of U. S. Army in Alaska.
- TV 699 – The Army's Floating Workshop
- TV 700 – Your Army Reports: Number 8
- TV 701 – US Army Combat Development Command
- TV 702 – To Answer the Call (Color – 1967) Story of the mission and capabilities of the Army and Air National Guard.
- TV 703 – Probe and Pursue
- TV 704 – The Army and Vietnam
- TV 705 – Vietnam Village Reborn (Color – 1967) Shows operation LAM SON II, a combined U.S. and Vietnam revolutionary development program, is conducted by the U.S. 1st Division and ARVN 5th Division to restore a terrorized village.
- TV 706 – The Inner Ring
- TV 707 – Your Army Reports
- TV 708 – (VTR 11) – Stay Alert, Stay Alive
- TV 709 – It's Up to You – Basic Combat Training combat (Color – 1967) A young soldier in advanced training recounts his experiences during the Army basic combat training course from the time of initial processing to graduation.
- TV 710 – Shotgun Rider
- TV 711 – The I in Infantry – The Individual (Color – 1967) A young soldier describes his development as an infantryman during the eight-week advanced individual training course at the Ft. Ord Infantry Training Center.
- TV 712 – The Pershing
- TV 713 – Your Army Reports

Excerpt of TV 713 "Your Army Reports–Institute of Heraldry"

- TV 714 – Screaming Eagles in Vietnam (Color – 1967) Combat missions of the 1st Brigade, 101st Airborne Division, from the summer of 1965 to January 1967: operations Van Buren, Harrison, Hawthorne, John Paul Jones, and Pickett.
- TV 715 – The OCS Story (Color – 1967) Reviews history and development of Army's OCS program since its inception in World War I, and then follows one candidate through his training at the infantry OCS at Ft. Benning, Ga.
- TV 716 – The Big Red One in Vietnam
- TV 717 – Ready Around the World (Color – 1968) Depicts America's military readiness and strength in the complex international world of the '60s. A film account of the men on guard around the world.
- TV 718 – Your Army Reports
- TV 719 – Army Transportation – Key to Mobility (Color – 1968) The story of the men in the Army transportation corps, who deliver men and equipment to t h e battlefields. Depicts their mission and their training.
- TV 720 – The Sky Soldiers (Color – 1968) The story of the 173rd Airborne Brigade in Vietnam; operations at Vung Tau and Bien Hoa, and operation "new life," protecting the rice harvest for a hungry people.
- TV 721 – Physical Fitness (Color – 1968) Describes the Army's emphasis on physical training, to develop physically fit men and women to protect the interests of the United States.
- TV 722 – 1st Cavalry Division (Airmobile) The New First Team
- TV 723 – When the Chips are Down (Color – 1968) Host Narrator Bob Hope. Shows the training and readiness of the citizen-soldiers of the National Guard, a major part of the nation's strength in reserve.
- TV 724 – Ready to Strike (Color – 28 min – 1968) Depicts the "Tropic Lightning" 25th Infantry Division; its history, and its exploits in Vietnam as a combat unit and a nation-building force.
- TV 725 – Song of the Soldier (Color – min – 1968) Members of the Chorus of the U.S. Army Band sing the songs which have been identified with periods of crisis and conflict in the nation's history, from the Revolutionary War to Vietnam.
- TV 726 – The Army's Civilians (Color – 28 min – 1968) Depicts the highly skilled and dedicated work of the civilians working for the Army at home and abroad, in peace and war.
- TV 727 – CONARC Headquarters of the US Soldier
- TV 728 – The Army Triangle (Color – 1968) Food, mail, pay; three things dear to the heart of every soldier. Shows how these important items are processed and delivered to the soldier.
- TV 729 – Your Army Reports
- TV 731 – The Senior Soldier
- TV 732 – They Clear the Way (Color – 1968) Recounts the story of the Army Corps of Engineers and their mission in Vietnam to build bridges, airfields, and roads that bring mobility to the combat forces.
- TV 733 – Platoon Leader (Color – 1968) Shows the men of leadership who take a platoon of men in battle, quickly assessing the situation and making the right decisions at the right time.
- TV 734 – Your Army Reports
- TV 735 – The Fight for Life (Color – 1968) Documents the remarkable work being done by the men and women of the Army medical service as they provide medical assistance in the field and the hospitals of Vietnam.
- TV 736 – Vietnam Crucible
- TV 737 – The Bridge (Color – 1968) Looks at the clergymen in uniform, the Chaplain's Corps. Describes the history of the Corps and describes dedication of the men in it. Also visits Chaplain's School.
- TV 738 – USARPAC (Color – 1968) Describes the activities and responsibilities of U.S. Army, Pacific, or USARPAC, comprising the men and missions in Vietnam, Korea, Okinawa, Japan, Taiwan, and Hawaii.
- TV 739 – Soldiers-at-Law (Color – 1968) Shows the training that qualifies the civilian attorney as a judge advocate or military lawyer. Emphasizes how individual rights are guarded by the Military Judicial System.
- TV 741 – Men With a Mission (Color – 1968) History, mission, and training, of the U.S. Army Reserve, highlighting its role during and after World War II, the Korean War, and in Vietnam.
- TV 742 – Meeting the Need (Color – 1968) Takes a comprehensive look at the scientists and facilities of the U.S. Army Natick Labs, which provide research, development, and testing of foods, clothing, and equipment.
- TV 743 – Your Army Reports
- TV 744 – To Serve a Soldier (Color – 1968) Service facilities made available by Army special services to U.S. soldiers around the world: Service clubs, arts and crafts program, Army libraries, soldier shows, sports program, US0 shows, and R&R program.
- TV 745 – Soldier's Christmas (Color – 1968) No matter where a soldier is stationed, from a remote Arctic outpost to the steaming jungles of Vietnam, the spirit of Christmas finds its way to him.
- TV 746 – The Ninth Infantry Division (Color – 1968) Shows the undefeated battle record of the Ninth Infantry Division in World War II, and the new challenges to the "Old Reliable" today in Vietnam.
- TV 747 – The Big Green Lab (Color – 1969) In the jungles and forests of Panama, the Army test and evaluation command devises new methods to protect men and equipment against the ravages of heat and humidity.
- TV 748 – The First Air Cavalry Division (Color – 1969) The story of how air mobility is helping the First Air Cavalry, the "First Team," win the battle for freedom in Southeast Asia.
- TV 749 – Logistics in Vietnam (Pipeline to Victory) (Color – 28 min – 1968) Documents the logistical effort and facilities at major supply ports and bases in Vietnam, and delineates the role of Army transportation, aviation, engineer, quartermaster, ordnance, and medical services in support of the fighting man.
- TV 750 – West Point – The Army Challenge (Color – 1969) Documents the story of a young man who enters the U.S. military academy and completes four years of study to qualify for a commission as a second lieutenant, U.S. Army.
- TV 751 – Equal to the Environment (Color – 1969) Shows how lessons learned, and history, are used to train our soldiers to fight the dangers and problems of a hostile climate and terrain, as well as the enemy.
- TV 752 – The Army Air Mobility Team (Color – 1969) Demonstrates how air mobility enables units and supplies to be immediately responsive to needs of combat operations in the difficult terrain of south-east Asia.
- TV 753 – Seek and Strike (Color – 1969) Looks at the development of mobile armor, and examines the training of a tanker as he learns to move, shoot, and communicate from aboard the latest combat vehicles.
- TV 754 – The Soldier's Heritage (Color – 1969) Documents the heritage of courage and sacrifice of the American fighting man in the determination to preserve Freedom throughout the history of the nation.
- TV 755 – The Voice of Command (Color – 1969) Tells the story of the globe-spanning communications chain that links the widely separated Army elements into a single force, instantly responsive to the nation's needs.
- TV 756 – The Silver Rifles (Color – 1969) Describes the meaning and tradition behind the combat infantryman's badge.
- TV 757 – Korea Revisited (Color – 1969) Presents a look at the Republic of Korea today to show the progress and development of the nation and its people.
- TV 758 – Ranger (Color – 1969) Visits Fort Benning, GA., where selected officers and men are trained to develop their leadership skills to the ultimate degree, earning the coveted ranger shoulder tab.
- TV 759 – Call Me Mister (Warrant Officer) (Color – 1969) Describes the qualifications for the warrant officer training program, nature and scope of training, career fields for warrant officer specialists, and opportunities for professional advancement.
- TV 760 – US Army Ft. Hood, Texas, Joint Organization Day (Military Vehicle Rides: Tanks, Jeeps and Personnel Carriers)
- TV 761 – United States Army Europe (Color – 1969) Describes the role of US Army Europe as a deterrent force in Western Europe, covering both the missions exclusive of NATO as well as those performed as a member of NATO.
- TV 762 – D-Day Anniversary (B&W – 1969) Replays the drama and battle action of the period of the landing at Normandy and the fierce combat to overcome the wall of "Fortress Europe" in June 1944.
- TV 763 – NATO – The Changed Face of Europe (Color – 1969) A salute to NATO as it celebrates its 20th anniversary. Reviews the history and accomplishments of NATO, and defines its present role in defense, of Western Europe. President Richard M. Nixon underscores NATO's relevance for the future.
- TV 764 – The Fourth Infantry Division (Color – 1969) Tells the story of the "Ivymen" in Vietnam, from their arrival in 1966 through the critical battle for Dak To in the winter of 1968.
- TV 765 – Meeting Tomorrow's Challenge (Color – 1970) Documents the Army Materiel Command's continuing task to develop, produce, and distribute everything the soldier needs, from boots to rifles, missiles to mess kits.
- TV 766 – The Golden Knights – The Army Parachute Team (Color – 1969) Shows the Army parachute team performing their spectacular free-fall acrobatics and testing new air-delivery techniques and equipment.
- TV 767 – The Men From The Boys (Color – 1969) Shows how new recruits are transformed into trained soldiers during the first eight weeks of basic training, focusing on the role of the assigned drill sergeant and the reactions of the young inductees.
- TV 768 – Americal Division (Color – 1969) Focuses on the history of the "Americal" Division; its participation in World War II against the Japanese, and its reactivation to carry on in Vietnam.
- TV 769 – Your Army Reports #18 (Color – 1969) Reports on: the Chaparral–Vulcan Air Defense System for use against low-flying aircraft; EUCOM, the United States Joint Services Command on Guard with NATO.
- TV 770 – The 11th Armored Cavalry Regiment (Color – 1969) Covers the activities in Vietnam of the "Black Horse" regiment, which proved that armored vehicles could be used under the jungle and marsh conditions found in Vietnam.
- TV 771 – Scout Dogs (Color – 1969) Shows these modern-day counterparts of the K-9 Corps as they train with their handlers at Fort Gordon and Fort Benning, Georgia.
- TV 772 – 82nd Airborne Division (Color – 1970) Traces the history of the "All American" 82nd Airborne, the first Army airborne division, in World War II, in Santo Domingo in 1965, and in Vietnam.
- TV 773 – Testing at Aberdeen (Color – 1969) Looks at tank and artillery testing at some of the most brutal and exacting test courses in the world, at Test and Evaluation Command's Aberdeen Proving Ground, Mo.
- TV 774 – The Combat Infantry Soldier
- TV 775 – What Makes a Modern Army? (Color – 1970) Describes the high standards of training and logistic support afforded today's soldier to enable him to implement the four responsibilities of the modern Army – mission, motivation, modernization, and management.
- TV 776 – A Day in America (Color – 1969) Presents the story of one day in America, the story of people going about their daily business, keeping America on the move under one free democratic system.
- TV 777 – What Price Confidence (Color – 28 min – 1970) Depicts the Army test and evaluation command, which insures that equipment is free from, defects and will function in any climate and on any terrain.
- TV 778 – A Visit to Mars (Color – 1970) Presents a look at the military affiliate radio system, its history, its operations, and its part in our worldwide network of communications.
- TV 779 – Language Power For Peace (Color – 1970) Documents the imaginative approaches used by the Defense Language Institute to the task of teaching servicemen fifty different foreign languages.
- TV 780 – The Feminine Touch (Color – 1970) Spotlights the contribution of the 12,000 members of the Women's Army Corps in more than one hundred military job specialties, adding the feminine touch to the Army.
- TV 781 – Engineering for Tomorrow (Color – 1970) Details research, development, and construction work of the Corps of Engineers; includes flood control, polar research in Greenland, and a seaborne nuclear power plant.
- TV 782 – The Spirit of Fort Benning (Color – 1970) Describes Fort Benning, Georgia, the largest and most comprehensive infantry training center in the free world.
- TV 783 – The Army Nurse (Color – 1970) Offers a comprehensive look at the dedicated women and men of the Army Nurse Corps, and their duties throughout the world since 1901.
- TV 784 – Fort Sill – The Field Artillery Center (Color – 1970) Visits Fort Sill on the 100th Anniversary of its founding; shows the artillery center and school, the museum, and a "live fire" demonstration.
- TV 785 – The Largest School House in the World (Color – 1970) Describes the scope and benefits of the U.S. Army general educational development program.
- TV 786 – The General Bradley Story (Color – 1970) Another in the "Famous Generals" series. A film documentary of the life and career of General Omar Bradley.
- TV 787 – 8th Infantry Division (Color – 1970) Describes the versatility of the 8th Infantry "Path-Finder" Division, and its training activities in Europe.
- TV 788 – Prelude to Taps (Color – 1971) Members of the "Old Guard" 3rd Infantry perform drills and tableaus to dramatize the role of the U.S. Army in the Growth of our country.
- TV 789 – The Border Watchers (Color – 1970) The story of the 2nd and 14th Armored Cavalry Regiments who stand guard on the delicate borderline between the free world and the iron curtain countries of Eastern Europe.
- TV 790 – The Army's Helping Hand (Color – 1970) The Army's role in civil assistance programs in the US and abroad. Construction, Medical and educational assistance, and disaster relief are shown.
- TV 791 – Fort Bliss – Heart of Army Air Defense (Color – 1970) Shows some of the highly technical and exacting training the Army Air Defense Command gives the men who operate our electronic air defense network.
- TV 792 – Progress to Peace (Color – 1971) Describes the Pacification and Vietnamization efforts of the US Army in Vietnam.
- TV 793 – Recondo (Color – 28 min – 1970) Follows a class of soldiers through the three-week training course to become recondo, a soldier who plans and makes reconnaissance patrols into enemy territory.

Excerpt of TV 793 "Recondo"

- TV 794 – US Army Alaska (Color – 1972) Traces the numerous contributions of the military to the development of our 49th state, examining in detail the training centers and troop activities that are USARAL.
- TV 795 – The Third Armored Division-Spearhead (Color – 28 min – 1970) Describes the enormous power and mobility of the modern Third Armored Division in Germany, and the intensive year-round training that keeps its combat readiness sharply honed.
- TV 796 – The Guns at Springfield (Color – 1971) Shows the story of the development of the US Army's small arms from the French and Indian War through the Vietnam War, in a tour through the Springfield Armory Museum.
- TV 798 – The Might of the Pen (Color – 1971) Describes the work of the combat historians and combat artists who record the actions and faces of an Army at war.
- TV 799 – The Fourth Armored Division (Color – 1971) Shows how the division keeps ready to provide armored support for the ground forces of NATO in West Germany, and how the men foster excellent German-American relations,
- TV 800 – Mapping a Better Tomorrow (Color – 1971) Shows the activities of the topographic command, making maps of the earth for war and peaceful uses, and maps of the moon for the Apollo Astronauts.
- TV 801 – The Third Infantry Division (Color – 1971) Graphically outlines the mission and training of this mechanized infantry division, the “Rock of the Marne” in World Wars, Korea, and its present mission in Western Europe.
- TV 802 – The Twenty-Fourth Infantry Division (Color – 1971) Shows the division with the insignia of Hawaiian Taro Leaf; its fighting across the Pacific to the occupation of Japan, its reactivation during the Korean War, and its deactivation in 1970.
- TV 803 – Hall of Heroes (Color – 1971) Describes the bravery of the men named in the Hall of Heroes, dedicated to those who have won the Medal of Honor.
- TV 804 – Young American Leaders (Color – 1971) Shows how the U.S. Army makes leaders out of today's young Americans, in OCS, ROTC, the Military Academy, and other training facilities, preparing them for leadership in the Army and in civilian life.
- TV 805 – Vision to Victory (Color – 1971) Depicts the Combat Developments Command's mission to evolve, test, evaluate, and to recommend the concepts which will determine the future structure, tactics, and equipment of the Army.
- TV 806 – There is a Way (Color – 1971) Provides an inside look at the US Military Academy preparatory School, which helps men, otherwise unable, to qualify for entrance to the military academy at West Point.
- TV 807 – First Infantry Division in Vietnam (1965–1970) (Color – 1971) Chronicles the major battle actions of the "Big Red One" in Vietnam, as well as some of their civic action projects there.
- TV 808 – Toward a Better Environment (Color – 1971) Documents the efforts of the Army Environmental Hygiene Agency to control the new problems which threaten man's environment, including pesticides and water and air pollution.
- TV 809 – Mission in Action (Color – 1971) Reviews the contributions of the men and women of the US Army Reserve to the active army's mission in Vietnam.
- TV 810 – AII the word to all the Troops (Color – 28 – 1971) Describes the functions and activities of "Stars and Stripes" newspaper and the American forces radio and television service, which keep troops overseas informed on matters at home and abroad.
- TV 811 – The Army's Music Men (Color – 1971) Explores the training and missions of the Army's music men today. Narrates the story of US Army Bands and musicians who provide music to lift the steps of our soldiers.
- TV 812 – The Army's Other Role (Color – 1971) Portrays the US Army's civil assistance role; projects shown include the Lewis and Clark expedition, The Panama Canal, Road and waterway construction, and disaster relief.
- TV 814 – The Making of the Soldier–Policeman (Color – 1971) Follows a military police trainee through such activities as accident reporting, riot control, and marihuana detection. Also describes rehabilitation program for military prisoners.
- TV 815 – Pioneering for Tomorrow (Color – 1971) Surveys important research and development activities which have provided better materials, products, and services to the Army and to the general public.
- TV 816 – Citizen Soldier Community Leader (Color – 29 min – 1971) This film is an excellent portrayal of the role of US Army Reserve units in community relations/domestic action activities. Army Reserve units are depicted in their role as citizen soldiers in parts of the United States and Puerto Rico.
- TV 817 – USO – 30 Years of Service (Color – 1971) Takes a look at the US0 today, from San Francisco to Boston, Southeast Asia to Italy, featuring Bob Hope; a worldwide documentary about this service to servicemen and women.
- TV 819 – The US Army in Space and Under the Sea (Color – 1971) Spotlights the Army's contributions to the space program and its underwater salvage operations. Highlights the Army's early contributions in rocketry, mapping the Moon, and communications.
- TV 822 – Materiel Readiness (Color – 1971) Describes the value of materiel readiness in today's Army comparing the relatively simple needs of the American Revolutionary War with the complex logistical operations of today.
- TV 823 – Drill Sergeant (Color – 1971) Focuses on one Army drill sergeant as he goes about his daily duties of shaping and molding young civilians into soldiers.
