= Hold Back the Night (novel) =

1951 novel by Pat Frank

- Author: Pat Frank
- Language: English
- Publisher: J. B. Lippincott & Co.
- Publication date: 1951
- Publication place: United States
- Media type: print
- Pages: 159
- ISBN: 0-062-42181-6

Hold Back the Night is a 1951 Korean War novel by Pat Frank. It chronicles the struggles of an American Marine Corps company during the retreat following the Battle of Chosin Reservoir. The plot centres on an unopened bottle of scotch owned by the commander of Dog Company as a lure to inspire his struggling company. Kirkus Reviews characterized the story as "A war story out of Korea which stays out of the bitter, grim school with its underlying warmth and belief in human goodness." It said that the story is a good mixture of sentimentality and "hard-boiledness". In 1956, the book was adapted as a movie starring John Payne and Chuck Connors.
