= Hold Back the Night =

1956 film by Allan Dwan

- Original film poster
- Directed by: Allan Dwan
- Written by: Walter Doniger; John C. Higgins; Pat Frank based on his novel
- Produced by: Hayes Goetz
- Starring: John Payne; Mona Freeman; Peter Graves; Chuck Connors; Audrey Dalton
- Cinematography: Ellsworth Fredericks
- Edited by: Allied Artists
- Music by: Hans J. Salter
- Distributed by: Allied Artists
- Release date: July 29, 1956
- Running time: 80 minutes
- Country: United States
- Language: English

Hold Back the Night is a 1956 American war film about the Korean War based on the 1951 novel by Pat Frank, who had been a war correspondent in Korea. The film was directed by Allan Dwan; his third film with John Payne and his third film about the United States Marine Corps, the others being Abroad with Two Yanks (1944) and Sands of Iwo Jima (1949).

== Plot ==
The film tells the story in flashbacks of a bottle of scotch carried by a World War II Marine lieutenant and Korean War captain, Sam MacKenzie. His girl Anne gives it to him in 1942, but tells him to save it for a very special occasion. She asks him to marry her before he ships out to the fighting, but he does not want to risk making her a widow. While on leave in Melbourne, Sam meets Kitty and considers a dalliance, but leaves when he learns she has a husband who may be a Japanese prisoner of war or dead. When he returns to Anne, he is disgusted to find she has acquired a major as an admirer. However, they get things straightened out and marry.

During the Korean War, Sam's Easy Company, 2nd Battalion, 7th Marine Regiment, First Marine Division, is pursuing the fleeing North Korean Army and looking forward to going home. However, Sam is informed by his superior that the Chinese have entered the war, so they will have to conduct a "fighting withdrawal". Sam is ordered to provide flank protection for the regiment.

That night, the Chinese attack in battalion strength and almost overrun the company, but artillery fire drives them back. The retreat over the next few days is a nightmare of ambushes and mounting losses. His last remaining officer, Lieutenant Couzens, is wounded. Finally, the men are too tired to go on, so Sam uses his bottle of scotch ... as incentive for once they rejoin their side. They eventually have to abandon their last few vehicles, but throughout, Sam insists that none of the wounded be left behind, even if they have to carry them. While dealing with an enemy tank, Sam is shot. An American helicopter spots them and is able to evacuate the most seriously wounded, including Sam. The rest, along with the bottle entrusted to them, reach friendly lines under the leadership of Sergeant Ekland. Once they are safe, Ekland offers the men the scotch, but nobody wants to drink it, feeling it has been lucky for them. The bottle is returned to Sam, who is still saving it for an important occasion.

== Cast ==
- John Payne as Lieutenant / Captain Sam MacKenzie
- Mona Freeman as Anne
- Peter Graves as Lieutenant Couzens
- Chuck Connors as Sergeant Ekland
- Audrey Dalton as Kitty
- Robert Nichols as Beany Smith (as Bob Nichols)
- John Wilder as Tinker
- Robert Easton as Ackerman (as Bob Easton)
- Stanley Cha as Kato
- Nicky Blair as Papiro
- John Craven as Major Bob MacKay
- Nelson Leigh as Lieutenant Colonel Toomey
- Otis Greene as Goodman, the medic (uncredited)
- James Westmoreland as Radio Operator (uncredited)

== Production ==
The film was shot with the cooperation of the United States Marine Corps at the Mountain Warfare Training Center at Pickel Meadows, California that recreated the events of the Battle of Chosin Reservoir.

Allied Artists originally approached the Marine Corps for assistance after the book's initial release. The Corps turned down cooperation with the producers as they felt the film was too close to the recently filmed Retreat, Hell!. Though Allied Artists contemplated rewriting the film to involve the US Army, they shelved the film for a few years, with the Corps cooperating. Sequences of the film were also shot at Bronson Canyon with artificial snow.

== See also ==
- List of American films of 1956
