= René Auberjonois =

American actor (1940–2019)

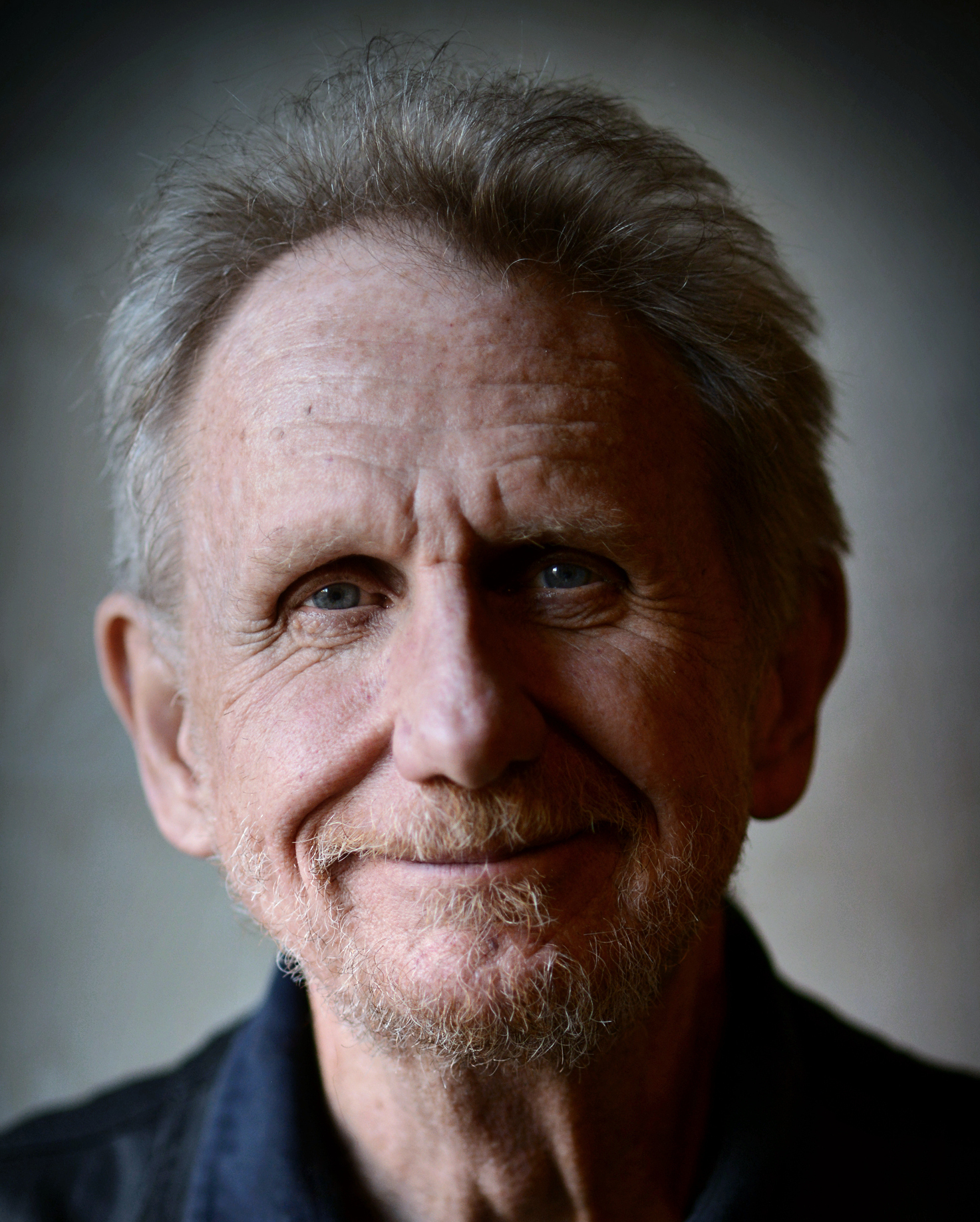
- Auberjonois in 2013
- Born: René Marie Murat Auberjonois; June 1, 1940; New York City, U.S.
- Died: December 8, 2019 (aged 79); Los Angeles, California, U.S.
- Education: Carnegie Mellon University (BFA)
- Occupations: Actor; television director
- Years active: 1962–2019
- Spouse: Judith Helen Mihalyi (m. 1963)
- Children: 2, including Rémy-Luc
- Father: Fernand Auberjonois
- Relatives: René Auberjonois (grandfather); Joachim Murat (great-great-great-grandfather); Caroline Bonaparte (great-great-great-grandmother)

René Marie Murat Auberjonois (/rəˈneɪ oʊˌbɛərʒənˈwɑː/ rə-NAY oh-BAIR-zhən-WAH; June 1, 1940 – December 8, 2019) was an American actor. He was a Tony Award and Drama Desk Award winner, and a three-time Emmy Award (two Primetime, one Daytime) nominee, among other accolades.

He first achieved fame as a stage actor, winning the Tony Award for Best Featured Actor in a Musical in 1970 for his portrayal of Sebastian Baye opposite Katharine Hepburn in the André Previn–Alan Jay Lerner musical Coco. He went on to earn three more Tony nominations for performances in Neil Simon's The Good Doctor (1973), Roger Miller's Big River (1985), and Cy Coleman's City of Angels (1989); he won a Drama Desk Award for Big River. In 2018, Auberjonois was inducted into the American Theater Hall of Fame.

A screen actor with more than 200 credits, Auberjonois was most famous for portraying characters in the main casts of several long-running television series, including Clayton Endicott III on Benson (1980–86), for which he was an Emmy nominee; Odo on Star Trek: Deep Space Nine (1993–99), and Paul Lewiston on Boston Legal (2004–08). In films, Auberjonois appeared in several Robert Altman productions, notably Father John Mulcahy in the film version of M*A*S*H (1970); the expedition scientist Roy Bagley in King Kong (1976); Chef Louis in The Little Mermaid (1989), in which he sang "Les Poissons"; and Reverend Oliver in The Patriot (2000). Auberjonois also performed as a voice actor in several video games, most notable being his role as Mr. Robert Edwin House, the reclusive Las Vegas casino owner in Fallout: New Vegas (2010).

== Early life and education ==
René Marie Murat Auberjonois was born June 1, 1940, in Manhattan, New York City. His father, Swiss-born Fernand Auberjonois, was a Cold War–era foreign correspondent and Pulitzer Prize–nominated writer. Auberjonois' mother, Princess Laure Louise Napoléone Eugénie Caroline Murat, was a great-great-granddaughter of Joachim Murat (one of Napoleon's marshals and King of Naples during the First French Empire), and his wife—Napoleon's youngest sister—Caroline Bonaparte. Auberjonois had a sister and a brother, and two half-sisters from his mother's first marriage. Auberjonois wrote that his French family name, an uncommon one in the United States, means "armorer."

Auberjonois' grandfather, also named René Auberjonois, was a Swiss post-Impressionist painter. His maternal grandmother, Hélène Macdonald Stallo, was an American from Cincinnati, Ohio; his maternal grandfather's mother was a Russian noblewoman, Eudoxia Michailovna Somova, and his maternal grandfather's paternal grandmother, Caroline Georgina Fraser, who was the wife of Prince Napoleon Lucien Charles Murat, was a Scottish American from Charleston, South Carolina.

Auberjonois' family moved to Paris after World War II. After a few years in France, the family moved back to the United States and joined the South Mountain Road artists' colony in Rockland County, New York, whose residents included Burgess Meredith, John Houseman, and Lotte Lenya.

The Auberjonois family also lived for a time in London, where Auberjonois completed high school while studying theater. To complete his education, he attended the Carnegie Institute of Technology (now Carnegie Mellon University), and graduated with a Bachelor of Fine Arts from the College of Fine Arts in 1962.

== Career ==
=== Theater ===
After college, Auberjonois worked with several different theater companies, beginning with three years at the prestigious Arena Stage in Washington, D.C. Auberjonois later stated that the school was his unofficial graduate school. He traveled between Los Angeles, California, and New York, working in numerous theater productions. He helped found Bill Ball's American Conservatory Theater in Pittsburgh, playing the title roles in both "Tartuffe" and "King Lear," before moving with the company to San Francisco. Then came the Mark Taper Forum in Los Angeles, and the Brooklyn Academy of Music Repertory Company in New York City. He was a member of the Peninsula Players summer theater program during the 1962 season.

Auberjonois was a member of the original faculty of the Juilliard School's Drama Division when it opened in 1968 under John Houseman.

In 1968, Auberjonois landed a role on Broadway, and appeared in three plays that season: as Fool to Lee J. Cobb's King Lear (the longest running production of the play in Broadway history), as Ned in A Cry of Players (which played in repertory with King Lear) opposite Frank Langella, and as Marco in Fire! In 1969, he earned a Tony Award for his performance as Sebastian Baye alongside Katharine Hepburn in Coco.

He received Tony nominations for his roles in Neil Simon's The Good Doctor (1973) opposite Christopher Plummer; as the Duke in Big River (1984), winning a Drama Desk Award; and, memorably, as Buddy Fidler/Irwin S. Irving in City of Angels (1989), written by Larry Gelbart and Cy Coleman.

Auberjonois' other Broadway appearances included Malvolio in Twelfth Night (1972); Scapin in Tricks (1973); Mr. Samsa in Metamorphosis (1989); Professor Abronsius in Dance of the Vampires, the English-language version of Jim Steinman's musical adaptation of Tanz der Vampire; and Jethro Crouch in Sly Fox (2004), for which he was nominated for Outstanding Featured Actor in a Play, an Outer Critics Circle Award.

Auberjonois appeared many times at the Mark Taper Forum, notably as Malvolio in Twelfth Night and as Stanislavski in Chekhov in Yalta. As a member of the Second Drama Quartet, he toured with Ed Asner, Dianne Wiest, and Harris Yulin. He appeared in the Tom Stoppard and André Previn work, Every Good Boy Deserves Favor, at the John F. Kennedy Center for the Performing Arts in Washington, D.C., and the Metropolitan Opera in New York.

He directed many theatrical productions, and starred in the Washington, D.C. production of 12 Angry Men (2004), where he portrayed "Juror #5" to Roy Scheider's "#8" and Robert Prosky's "#3". He made his debut at the Shakespeare Theatre Company in Washington, D.C., in 2008 as the titular character in Molière's The Imaginary Invalid.

He was on the advisory board of Sci-Fest LA, the first annual Los Angeles Science Fiction One-Act Play Festival, held in May 2014.

In 2018, Auberjonois was inducted into the American Theater Hall of Fame.

=== Films ===
Auberjonois played Father Mulcahy in the original film version of M*A*S*H. His subsequent film roles included the gangster Tony in Police Academy 5: Assignment Miami Beach (1988), and Reverend Oliver in The Patriot (2000). He made cameo appearances in a number of films, including a mental asylum doctor patterned after Tim Burton, in Batman Forever (1995), and a bird expert who gradually transforms into a bird in Robert Altman's 1970 film Brewster McCloud. He appeared as Colonel West, a minor role in the 1991 Star Trek film Star Trek VI: The Undiscovered Country, but his part was cut from the theatrical release. His other notable film appearances include: McCabe & Mrs. Miller (1971), Images (1972), Pete 'n' Tillie (1972), The Hindenburg (1975), King Kong (1976), The Big Bus (1976), Eyes of Laura Mars (1978), Where the Buffalo Roam (1980), Walker (1987), My Best Friend Is a Vampire (1987), The Feud (1989), Inspector Gadget (1999), and Eulogy (2004).

Auberjonois portrayed the character of Straight Hollander in the 1993 Miramax film The Ballad of Little Jo. He voiced Professor Genius in Little Nemo: Adventures in Slumberland, Louis the Chef in The Little Mermaid franchise, Flanagan in Cats Don't Dance, the Butler in Joseph: King of Dreams, and André in Planes: Fire & Rescue.

In 2019, Auberjonois portrayed the title role in Raising Buchanan as U.S. president James Buchanan.

=== Television ===
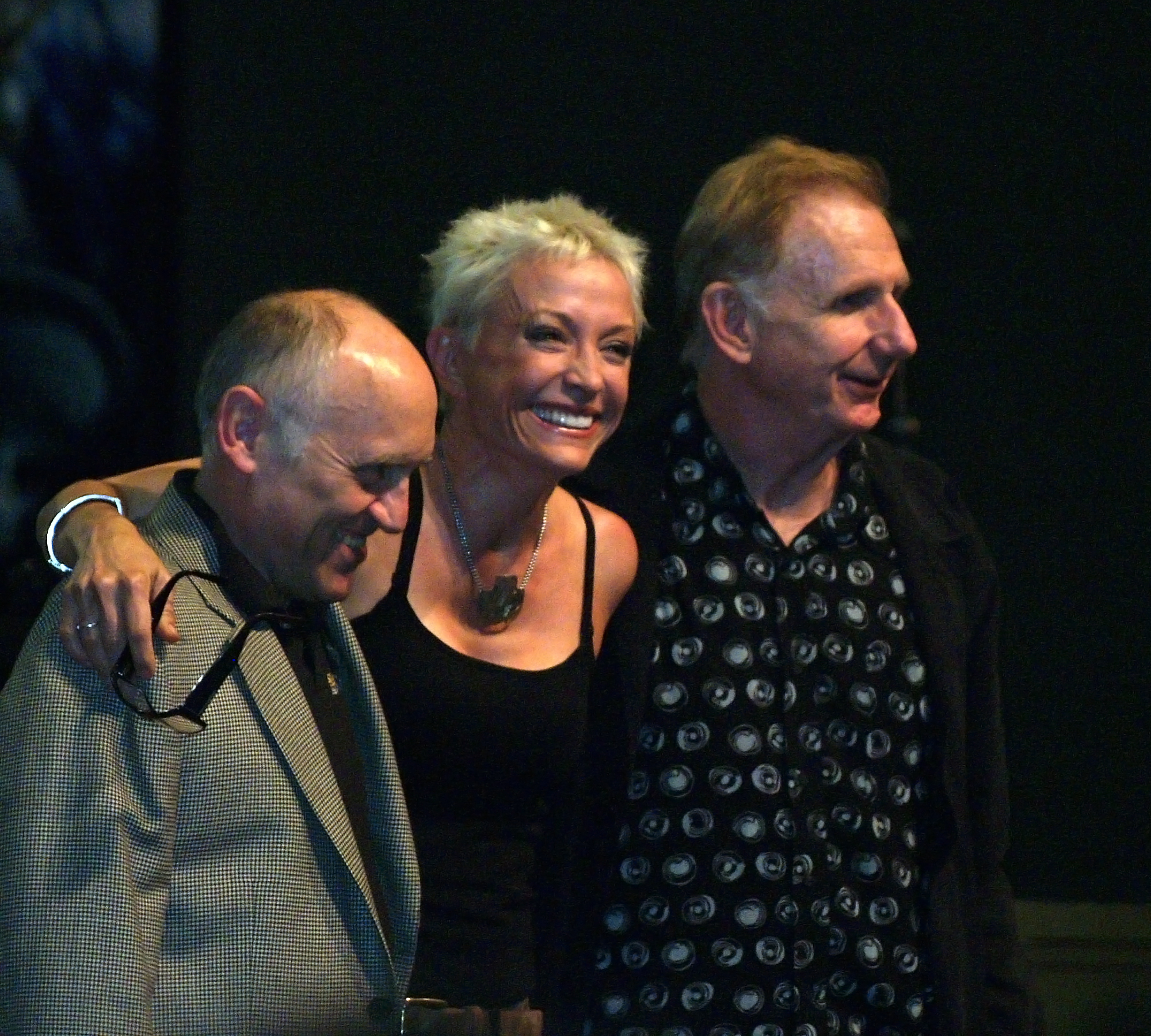
Auberjonois (right) with Star Trek: Deep Space Nine co-stars Armin Shimerman (left) and Nana Visitor (center)

In addition to having been a regular actor on three television shows (Benson, a situation comedy; Star Trek: Deep Space Nine in science fiction; and Boston Legal, a legal comedy drama), Auberjonois guest starred on many television series, including; Nash Bridges, Ellery Queen, Family, Grey's Anatomy, The Rockford Files, Charlie's Angels, Starsky & Hutch, Wonder Woman, Harry O, The Jeffersons, The Outer Limits, Night Gallery, Hart to Hart, Matlock, Murder, She Wrote, The Bionic Woman, Frasier, Judging Amy, Chicago Hope, The Bob Newhart Show, Star Trek: Enterprise, Stargate SG-1, Warehouse 13, Archer, L.A. Law, The Practice (for which he received an Emmy nomination, playing a different character than the one he played on The Practice spinoff Boston Legal), Saving Grace, It's Always Sunny in Philadelphia, Criminal Minds, NCIS, The Good Wife, The Librarians, and Madam Secretary.

His television film credits include The Rhinemann Exchange, The Dark Secret of Harvest Home, Disney's Geppetto, Gore Vidal's Billy The Kid, the remake of A Connecticut Yankee in King Arthur's Court, and the Sally Hemings: An American Scandal (2000) miniseries. He portrayed the character Fortunato in an episode of American Masters entitled "Edgar Allan Poe: Terror of the Soul" (1995). He received a third Emmy Award nomination for his performance in ABC's The Legend of Sleepy Hollow. He played NASA scientist Dr. Felix Blackwell in the NCIS episode "Phoenix".

Auberjonois as Odo in Star Trek: Deep Space Nine

Auberjonois directed television shows, including Marblehead Manor, and various episodes of Deep Space Nine.

=== Voice acting ===
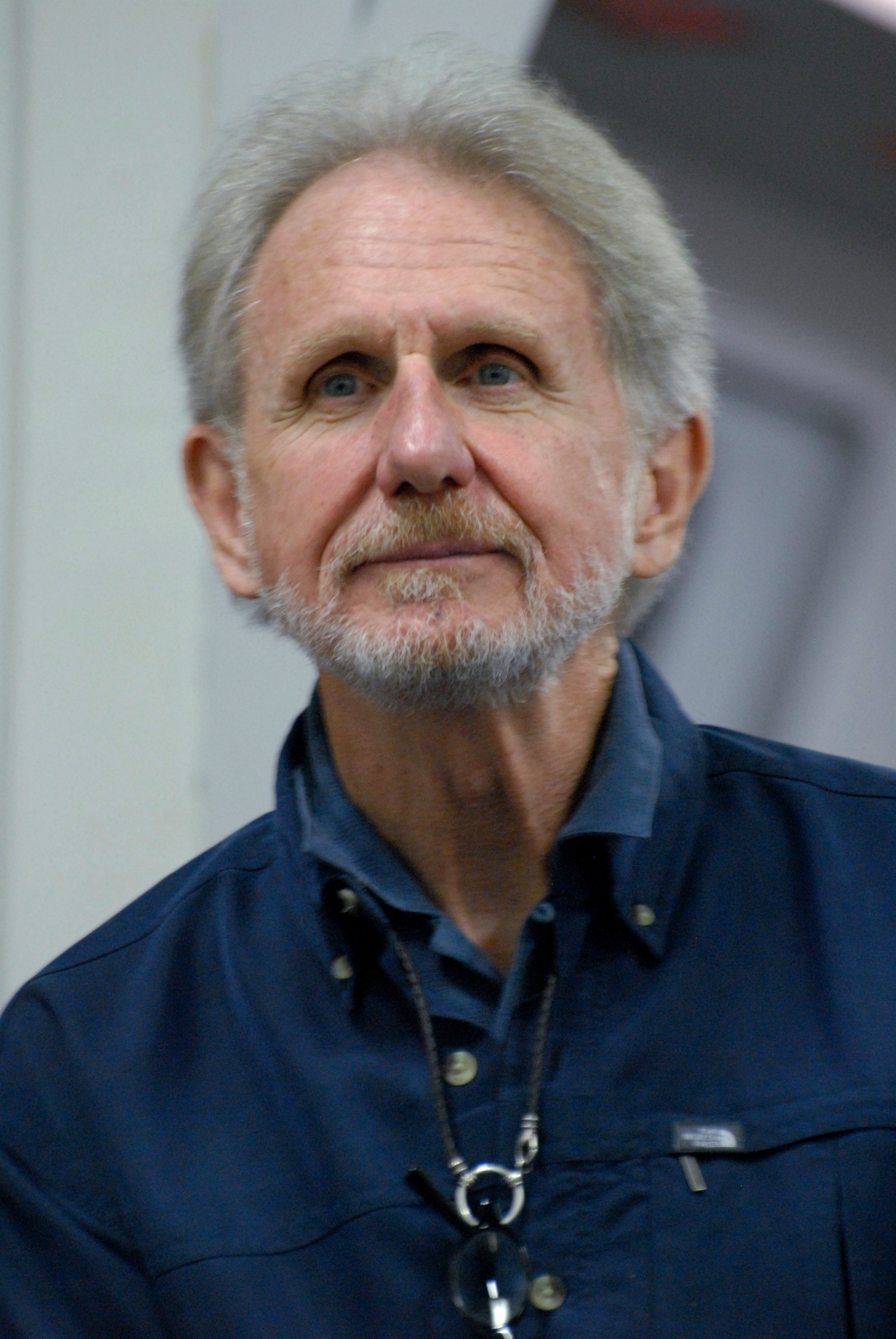
Pictured in 2010

Auberjonois was active in radio drama. He read "The Stunt" by Mordechai Strigler for the National Public Radio (NPR) series Jewish Stories From the Old World to the New, and he recorded novels on tape. On PRI, he was featured numerous times on Selected Shorts, reading works of dramatic fiction. His voice was heard in Disney's The Little Mermaid (in the supporting role of Chef Louis, singing "Les Poissons").

He did voice work on the Challenge of the GoBots series in 1980s as Dr. Braxis and was the voice of Peter Parker on the 1972 Buddah Records Spider-Man LP "From Beyond the Grave" (BDS 5119), a radio-style narrative replete with sound effects and rock and roll song interludes.

He voice acted in The Last Unicorn as the Skull that guards the clock that serves as an entryway into the Red Bull's lair. Peter S. Beagle, the author of the original book, praised Auberjonois' performance, saying "he could have played any role in that movie and I would have been happy ... He's that talented."

In 1984–1985, Auberjonois voiced DeSaad in the animated series Super Friends. From 1986 to 1987, he voiced Alvinar in the series Wildfire.

He provided the voice for Janos Audron, an ancient vampire in the Legacy of Kain video game series; he was in Soul Reaver 2, Blood Omen 2, and Legacy of Kain: Defiance. He provided the voice of Angler in the Pirates of the Caribbean: At World's End video game. He voiced General Zod in the Ruby-Spears animated Superman series episode "The Hunter".

Auberjonois provided minor character voices for Justice League, reprising his role as DeSaad and voicing Kanjar Ro and Galius Zed.

Auberjonois lent his voice talents to the 2001 Public Broadcasting System (PBS) American Experience documentary "Woodrow Wilson" as the title character, along with the 2003 PBS historical documentary Kingdom of David: The Saga of the Israelites.

In 2003, he provided the voice of Natori in the English dubbed version of semi-sequel to the Hayao Miyazaki film Whisper of the Heart, The Cat Returns. He reprised an animated version of his character Odo from Star Trek: Deep Space Nine in a cutaway joke in Family Guy's Stewie Griffin: The Untold Story. The cutaway featured a more humanoid-faced Odo threatening Stewie's alleged cousin Quark. Auberjonois also lent his voice to Skylanders: SuperChargers.

In 2011, he voiced villain Mark Desmond in Cartoon Network's Young Justice. He was also the voice of Leonard McLeish and Junkyard Jim in the Pound Puppies series, Pepé Le Pew in The Looney Tunes Show, Azmuth in Ben 10: Omniverse, and Ebony Maw in Avengers Assemble.

==== Video games ====
One of Auberjonois' earliest forays into video game voice acting was the role of Janos Audron in Soul Reaver 2; he continued to voice the character in subsequent releases in the Legacy of Kain series. According to a behind-the-scenes featurette in Soul Reaver 2, showing candid discussions among the voice actors during recording, he was surprised at the quality of the writing, asking, "This is for a video game?!" when the purpose of the recordings was brought to light.

Auberjonois provided the voice of Karl Schäfer, the honorable German explorer in the video game Uncharted 2: Among Thieves, and Mr. House, the reclusive New Vegas casino owner in the 2010 video game Fallout: New Vegas. He also voiced Dr. Ignatio Mobius in Command & Conquer: Renegade. He reprised his role as Odo in the game Star Trek: Deep Space Nine: The Fallen. In June 2018 he reprised his role as Odo in the massively multiplayer online role-playing game Star Trek Online.

== Personal life ==
Auberjonois was married to Judith Helen Mihalyi from 1963 until his death in 2019. They had a daughter, Tessa, and a son, Rémy-Luc, both of whom also became actors.

=== Illness and death ===
In an interview with Compassion & Choices Magazine, Judith Auberjonois revealed that René Auberjonois underwent chemotherapy for lung cancer in 2018. It was discovered in 2019 that the cancer had spread to his brain. Due to the potential for serious cognitive side effects, Auberjonois chose not to pursue the whole-brain radiation treatment suggested by his doctors.

As a resident of California, Auberjonois decided to seek medical aid in dying under the California End of Life Option Act. On December 6, 2019, he spent his final hours with his family at his home in Los Angeles reminiscing over photos and listening to music. He then took the medication prescribed for assisted suicide and died two days later at the age of 79. The California End of Life Option Act stipulates that death certificates should list the underlying terminal illness as the cause of death, rather than the use of life-ending medications. His cause of death was given as metastatic lung cancer.

== Filmography ==
=== Live-action ===
List of live-action performances in film
Year	Title	Role	Notes
1964	Lilith	Howie	Uncredited
1968	Petulia	Fred Six	Uncredited
1970	M*A*S*H	Father John Patrick "Dago Red" Mulcahy	
1970	Brewster McCloud	The Lecturer	
1971	McCabe & Mrs. Miller	Pat Sheehan	
1972	Images	Hugh	
1972	Pete 'n' Tillie	Jimmy Twitchell	
1975	The Hindenburg	Major Napier	
1976	The Big Bus	Father Kudos	
1976	King Kong	Roy Bagley	
1978	Eyes of Laura Mars	Donald Phelps	
1980	Where the Buffalo Roam	Harris	
1986	3:15 The Moment of Truth	Principal Horner	
1986	The Christmas Star	Mr Sumner	
1987	My Best Friend Is a Vampire	Modoc	
1987	Walker	Major Siegfried Henningson	
1988	Police Academy 5: Assignment Miami Beach	Tony	
1989	The Feud	Reverton	
1991	The Lost Language of Cranes	Geoffrey Lane	
1991	Star Trek VI: The Undiscovered Country	Colonel West	Uncredited
1992	The Player	René Auberjonois	
1993	The Ballad of Little Jo	Straight Hollander	
1995	Batman Forever	Dr. Burton	
1997	Snide and Prejudice	Dr. Sam Cohen	
1997	Los Locos: Posse Rides Again	Presidente	
1999	Inspector Gadget	Dr. Artemus Bradford	
2000	The Patriot	Reverend Oliver	
2000	We All Fall Down	Tim	
2001	Burning Down the House	Pierre	
2001	The Princess Diaries	Voice of Philippe Renaldi	Uncredited
2004	Eulogy	Parson Banke	
2015	This Is Happening	Cal Plotz	
2016	Certain Women	Albert	
2016	Blood Stripe	Art	
2018	What We Left Behind: Looking Back at Star Trek: Deep Space Nine	Himself - Odo	
2019	The Circuit		
2019	Windows on the World	Maury	
2019	Raising Buchanan	President James Buchanan	
2019	First Cow	Man with Raven	
2019	Cortex	Parks	Posthumous release

List of live-action performances in television
Year	Title	Role	Notes
1966	NET Playhouse	Ofoeti	Episode: "Ofoeti"
1971	The Mod Squad	Nelson/Endicott Faraday	Episode: "We Spy"
1971	McMillan & Wife	Andre Stryker	Episode: "Once Upon a Dead Man"
1971	The Birdmen (a.k.a. Escape of the Birdmen)	Halden Brevik, Olav Volda	Television film
1971	Night Gallery	William Sharsted	Episode: "Camera Obscura"
1972	NET Playhouse	George Washington	Episode: "Portrait of the Hero as a Young Man"
1973	Love, American Style	George	Episode: "Love and the Spaced-Out Chick"
1973	Conflict	Monceau	Episode: "Incident at Vichy"
1974	Theatre in America	Edgar	Episode: "King Lear"
1974	Ben Franklin in Paris	King Louis XVI	Episode: "The Ambassador"
1975	Harry O	Rabbit	Episode: "Anatomy of a Frame"
1975	The Rookies	Ron Kelly	Episode: "The Voice of Thunder"
1975	The Jeffersons	Inspector Keller	Episode: "Harry and Daphne"
1975	The Bob Newhart Show	Dr. Alan Durocher	Episode: "Shrinks Across the Sea"
1975	Saturday Night Live	Mr. Roberts	Season 1 Episode 4 (Albert Brooks Film)
1976	Panache	Panache	Television film
1976	Baa Baa Black Sheep	Matthew Hooper	Episode: "Small War"
1976–1977	Rhoda	Dr. John Fox	2 episodes
1977	The Bionic Woman	Pierre Lambert	Episode: "The DeJon Caper"
1977	Man From Atlantis	Havergal	Episode: "Crystal Water, Sudden Death"
1979	The Rockford Files	Masters	Episode: "With the French Heel Back, Can the Nehru Jacket Be Far Behind?"
1979	Family	Alvin	Episode: "Ballerina"
1979	Wonder Woman	James Kimball	Episode: "Spaced Out"
1979	CBS Library	Ichabod Crane	Episode: "Once Upon A Midnight Scary" (segment "The Legend of Sleepy Hollow")
1979	Charlie's Angels	Freddie Fortune	Episode: "Angels on Skates"
1979	Mrs. Columbo	Monsieur Gerard	Episode: "Word Games"
1979	Hart to Hart	Donald Springfield	Episode: "Max in Love"
1979–1980	The Wild Wild West Revisited	Captain Sir David Edney	Television film
1980	Tenspeed and Brown Shoe	Marty Boxx	Episode: "Untitled"
1980–1986	Benson	Clayton Endicott III	135 episodes
1986	Blacke's Magic	Arthur Pym	Episode: "Wax Poetic"
1987–1988	Murder, She Wrote	Professor Harry Papasian/ Captain Walker Thorn	2 episodes
1988	L.A. Law	Kevin Richardson	Episode: "The Son Also Rises"
1989	A Connecticut Yankee in King Arthur's Court	Merlin	Television film
1992	Eerie, Indiana	The Donald	Episode: "Zombies in P.J.s."
1993–1999	Star Trek: Deep Space Nine	Odo	173 episodes
1998	The Outer Limits	Dlavan	Episode: "Promised Land"
1999	Chicago Hope	Dr. Walter Perry	Episode: "Oh What a Piece of Work Is Man"
2000	Stargate SG-1	Alar	Episode: "The Other Side"
2000	The Practice	Judge F. Mantz	2 episodes
2001	Frasier	Professor William Tewksbury	2 episodes
2001	Nash Bridges	Hagen Bridges	Episode: "The Partner"
2002	Star Trek: Enterprise	Ezral	Episode: "Oasis"
2004–2008	Boston Legal	Paul Lewiston	71 episodes
2010	It's Always Sunny in Philadelphia	Dr. Larry Meyers	Episode: "The Gang Gets A New Member"
2010–2014	Warehouse 13	Hugo Miller	4 episodes
2011	Criminal Minds	Colonel Ron Massey	Episode: "Self-Fulfilling Prophecy"
2012	Grey's Anatomy	Neil Sheridan	Episode: "Support System"
2012	NCIS	Dr. Felix Blackwell	Episode "Phoenix"
2013	1600 Penn	Winslow Hannum	2 episodes
2013	The Good Wife	Coroner Claypool	Episode: "Invitation to an Inquest"
2015	The Librarians	Town librarian	Episode: "And the Fables of Doom" (season 1)
2016	Madam Secretary	Walter Nowack	4 episodes

=== Animation ===
List of voice performances in films
Year	Title	Role	Notes
1982	The Last Unicorn	The Skull	
1989	The Little Mermaid	Chef Louis	
1992	Little Nemo: Adventures in Slumberland	Professor Genius	
1997	Cats Don't Dance	Flanigan	
1998	An American Tail: The Treasure of Manhattan Island	Dithering	Direct-to-video
2000	The Little Mermaid II: Return to the Sea	Chef Louis	Direct-to-video
2000	Joseph: King of Dreams	Butler	Direct-to-video
2002	The Cat Returns	Natori	
2002	Tarzan & Jane	Renard Dumont	Direct-to-video
2005	Geppetto's Secret	Mr. Sneap	
2005	Stewie Griffin: The Untold Story	Odo	Direct-to-video
2007	Chill Out, Scooby-Doo!	Alphonse LaFleur	Direct-to-video
2014	Planes: Fire & Rescue	Concierge	

List of voice performances in animated series
Year	Title	Role	Notes
1980–1981	The Flintstone Comedy Show	Various roles	
1984	Super Friends: The Legendary Super Powers Show	DeSaad	Episode: "Darkseid's Golden Trap"
1984	Challenge of the GoBots	Dr. Zebediah Braxis	3 episodes
1985	The Super Powers Team: Galactic Guardians	DeSaad	6 episodes
1986	Wildfire	Alvinar	6 episodes
1987	The New Adventures of Jonny Quest	Various roles	13 episodes
1987	Snorks	Dr. Strangesnork, additional voices	42 episodes
1987	Pound Puppies	Poodle/Pierre	2 episodes
1988	DuckTales	Dr. Nogood	Episode: "Double-O Duck"
1988	The Completely Mental Misadventures of Ed Grimley	Various roles	13 episodes
1988	Superman	General Zod	Episode: "The Hunter"
1989	The Smurfs	Various roles	
1991–1993	The Pirates of Dark Water	Kangent	16 episodes
1991–1992	Tom & Jerry Kids	Hungry Pierre	2 episodes
1992	Batman: The Animated Series	Dr. March	2 episodes
1992	Teenage Mutant Ninja Turtles	Professor Chumley	Episode: "Super Irma"
1992	Raw Toonage	Chef Louis	Episode: "Draining Cats and Dogs/Mars vs. Man"
1993	Marsupilami	Chef Louis	3 episodes
1993	Bonkers	Winston Prickley	Episode: "Love Stuck"
1994	Rugrats	Jonathan Kraskell	Episode: "Mommy's Little Assets"
1994	The Little Mermaid	Chef Louis	Episode: "Ariel's Treasures"
1994	Aladdin	Nefir Hasenuf	3 episodes
1995–1996	The Savage Dragon	Horde	3 episodes
1996	The Great War and the Shaping of the 20th Century	Jean Jaurès, Mustafa Kemal Atatürk	3 episodes
1996	Richie Rich	Richard Rich, Chef Pierre, Professor Keenbean	13 episodes
1997	Captain Simian & the Space Monkeys	Gardener, Alien Gladioluses	Episode: "Escape from the Plant of the Apes"
1997	Extreme Ghostbusters	College professor	Episode: "Fallout"
1999	Men in Black: The Series	Quin'toon	Episode: "The Lost Continent Syndrome"
1999	Xyber 9: New Dawn	Xyber 9	22 episodes
2000	The Wild Thornberrys	Merrick Dash	Episode: "Happy Old Year"
2001–2002	The Legend of Tarzan	Renard Dumont	12 episodes
2001–2002	Max Steel	Dr. David Klimo, Bio-Constrictor, Train Conductor	3 episodes
2001	House of Mouse	Chef Louis	Episode: "Goofy's Menu Magic"
2001–2004	Justice League	Kanjar Ro, Galius Zed, DeSaad	3 episodes
2003	The Mummy	Scarab	2 episodes
2003	Xiaolin Showdown	Master Fung, Narrator	Season 1
2005	Avatar: The Last Airbender	Gan Jin Leader, Mechanist, additional voices	4 episodes
2005	Duck Dodgers	McChirpy	Episode: "Bonafide Heroes"
2009	Random! Cartoons	Hornswiggle	Episode: "Hornswiggle"
2010	The Cartoonstitute	Le Door	Episode: "Le Door"
2010	Archer	Manfred, Cardinal Giancarlo Corelli	3 episodes
2010	Young Justice	Mark Desmond	2 episodes
2011–2012	The Looney Tunes Show	Pepé Le Pew	3 episodes
2012–2014	Ben 10: Omniverse	Azmuth, Galvan Security Officer	6 episodes
2010–2013	Pound Puppies	McLeish	49 episodes
2014	Wander Over Yonder	Maurice	Episode: "The Lonely Planet"
2015	Buddy: Tech Detective	Gramps	Television film
2015	Avengers Assemble	Ebony Maw, World Leader #1	2 episodes
2018	The Tom and Jerry Show	Butler	Episode: "Downton Tabby"
2022	Star Trek: Prodigy	Odo	Episode: "Kobayashi"; Archive recordings

=== Stage ===
Year	Title	Role	Notes
1962	Volpone	Mosca	Arena Stage
1962	Amphytrion 38	Mercury	Alley Theatre
1967	Tartuffe	Tartuffe	American Conservatory Theater
1968	King Lear	Fool	Vivian Beaumont Theater, Broadway
1968	A Cry of Players	Ned	Vivian Beaumont Theater, Broadway
1969	Fire!	Marco	Longacre Theatre, Broadway
1969	Coco	Sebastian Baye	Mark Hellinger Theatre, Broadway
1972	Twelfth Night	Malvolio	Vivian Beaumont Theater, Broadway
1973	Tricks	Scapin	Alvin Theatre, Broadway
1973	The Good Doctor	Performer	Eugene O'Neill Theatre, Broadway
1979	Break A Leg	Johann Schiml	Palace Theatre, Broadway
1985	Big River	The Duke	Eugene O'Neill Theatre, Broadway
1989	Metamorphosis	Mr. Samsa	Ethel Barrymore Theatre, Broadway
1989	City of Angels	Buddy Fidler/Irwin S. Irving	Virginia Theatre, Broadway
2002	Dance of the Vampires	Professor Abronsius	Minskoff Theatre, Broadway
2004	Sly Fox	Jethro Crouch	Ethel Barrymore Theatre, Broadway

=== Video games ===
Year	Title	Voice role	Notes
1996	Star Trek: Deep Space Nine: Harbinger	Odo	
1999	Gabriel Knight 3: Blood of the Sacred, Blood of the Damned	Taxi Driver, Bigout	
1999	Star Trek: Deep Space Nine: The Fallen	Odo	
2000	Legacy of Kain: Soul Reaver 2	Janos Audron	
2000	Legacy of Kain: Blood Omen 2	Janos Audron, Beast	
2002	Command & Conquer: Renegade	Dr. Ignatio Mobius	
2002	New Legends	Topo, Kang	
2003	Legacy of Kain: Defiance	Janos Audron	
2009	Uncharted 2: Among Thieves	Karl Schäfer	
2010	Fallout: New Vegas	Mr. House	
2011	Uncharted 3: Drake's Deception	Karl Schäfer	
2013	Ben 10: Omniverse 2	Azmuth	
2015	Skylanders: SuperChargers	Pomfrey Lefuzzbutton	
2018	Star Trek Online	Odo	Victory is Life expansion

== Deep Space Nine directorial credits ==
List of Deep Space Nine directorial credits
Year	Season	Episode
1995	Season 3	"Prophet Motive"
1995	Season 3	"Family Business"
1995	Season 4	"Hippocratic Oath"
1995	Season 4	"The Quickening"
1995	Season 5	"Let He Who Is Without Sin..."
1996	Season 5	"Ferengi Love Songs"
1997	Season 6	"Waltz"
1998	Season 7	"Strange Bedfellows"

== Book narrations ==
Auberjonois' voice talents also included book narrations.

=== The Pendergast novels ===
- The Cabinet of Curiosities (2002)
- Still Life with Crows (2003)
- Diogenes Trilogy
  - Brimstone (2004)
  - Dance of Death (2005)
  - The Book of the Dead (2006)
- The Wheel of Darkness (2007)
- Cemetery Dance (2009)
- Helen Trilogy
  - Fever Dream (2010)
  - Cold Vengeance (2011)
  - Two Graves (2012)
- White Fire (2013)
- Blue Labyrinth (2014)
- Crimson Shore (2015)
- The Obsidian Chamber (2016)
- City of Endless Night (2018)
- Verses for the Dead (2018)

=== Other books ===
Title	Author/Contributors	Year
Blood Royal: A True Tale of Crime and Detection in Medieval Paris	Eric Jager	2014
World War Z: The Complete Edition (Movie Tie-in Edition): An Oral History of the Zombie War	Max Brooks	2013
The Bull Dancers	Jay Lake	2010
The Rise and Fall of Khan Noonien Singh, Vol. 2 (Star Trek: The Eugenics Wars)	Greg Cox	2002
Frenchtown Summer	Robert Cormier	2000
Isaac Asimov Countdown 2000	edited by Martin H. Greenberg	1999
Talismans of Shannara	Terry Brooks	1998
The Last Day	Glenn Kleier	1997
The Diving Bell and the Butterfly	Jean-Dominique Bauby	1997
Shadow Dawn	George Lucas and Chris Claremont	1996
Mind Slash Matter	Edward Wellen	1995
Shadow Moon	George Lucas and Chris Claremont	1995
The Cricket in Times Square	George Selden	1995
Batman Forever	Peter David	1995
Last Defender of Camelot	Roger Zelazny	1995
Unicorn Variation	Roger Zelazny	1995
The Fourth Procedure	Stanley Pottinger	1995
Star Trek Deep Space Nine: Warped	K. W. Jeter	1995
The List of 7	Mark Frost	1994
Star Trek Deep Space Nine: Fallen Heroes	Dafydd ab Hugh	1994
Slaves of Sleep & The Masters of Sleep	L. Ron Hubbard	1993
Murder at the National Cathedral	Margaret Truman	1993
Body and Soul	Frank Conroy	1993

== Awards and nominations ==
Institution	Year	Category	Work	Result
Actors Awards	2006	Outstanding Performance by an Ensemble in a Comedy Series	Boston Legal	Nominated
Actors Awards	2007	Outstanding Performance by an Ensemble in a Comedy Series	Boston Legal	Nominated
Actors Awards	2008	Outstanding Performance by an Ensemble in a Comedy Series	Boston Legal	Nominated
Austin Film Festival	2016	Audience Award (Narrative Feature)	Blood Stripe	Won
Daytime Emmy Awards	1980	Outstanding Individual Achievement in Children's Programming	CBS Library: Once Upon a Midnight Scary	Nominated
Drama Desk Awards	1985	Outstanding Featured Actor in a Musical	Big River	Won
Drama Desk Awards	1990	Outstanding Featured Actor in a Musical	City of Angels	Nominated
Garden State Film Festival	2020	Best Supporting Actor	Raising Buchanan	Nominated
Primetime Emmy Awards	1984	Outstanding Supporting Actor in a Comedy Series	Benson	Nominated
Primetime Emmy Awards	2001	Outstanding Guest Actor in a Drama Series	The Practice	Nominated
Prism Awards	2007	Performance in a Drama Series, Multi-Episode Storyline	Boston Legal	Won
Tony Awards	1970	Best Featured Actor in a Musical	Coco	Won
Tony Awards	1974	Best Featured Actor in a Play	The Good Doctor	Nominated
Tony Awards	1985	Best Featured Actor in a Musical	Big River	Nominated
Tony Awards	1990	Best Featured Actor in a Musical	City of Angels	Nominated
WorldFest-Houston	2020	Best Supporting Actor	Raising Buchanan	Nominated
