= Auberjonois =

Auberjonois is a surname originating from Romandy. Notable people with this surname include the following:

- Fernand Auberjonois (1910–2004), American journalist who worked as the foreign correspondent of the Pittsburgh Post-Gazette and the Toledo Blade
- Remy Auberjonois (born 1974), actor, son of actor René Auberjonois
- René Auberjonois (1940–2019), American character actor
- René Auberjonois (painter) (1872–1957), Swiss painter
