= Cemetery Dance =

Cemetery Dance may refer to:

- Cemetery Dance Publications, a specialty press publisher of horror and dark suspense
- Cemetery Dance (novel), a novel by Douglas Preston and Lincoln Child
