= Two Graves =

Two Graves may refer to:

- Two Graves (novel), a 2012 thriller novel by Douglas Preston and Lincoln Child
- Two Graves (TV series), an upcoming Spanish revenge thriller miniseries
