= The Dream of the Shepherd =

Painting by Ferdinand Hodler

- Der Traum des Hirten (German)
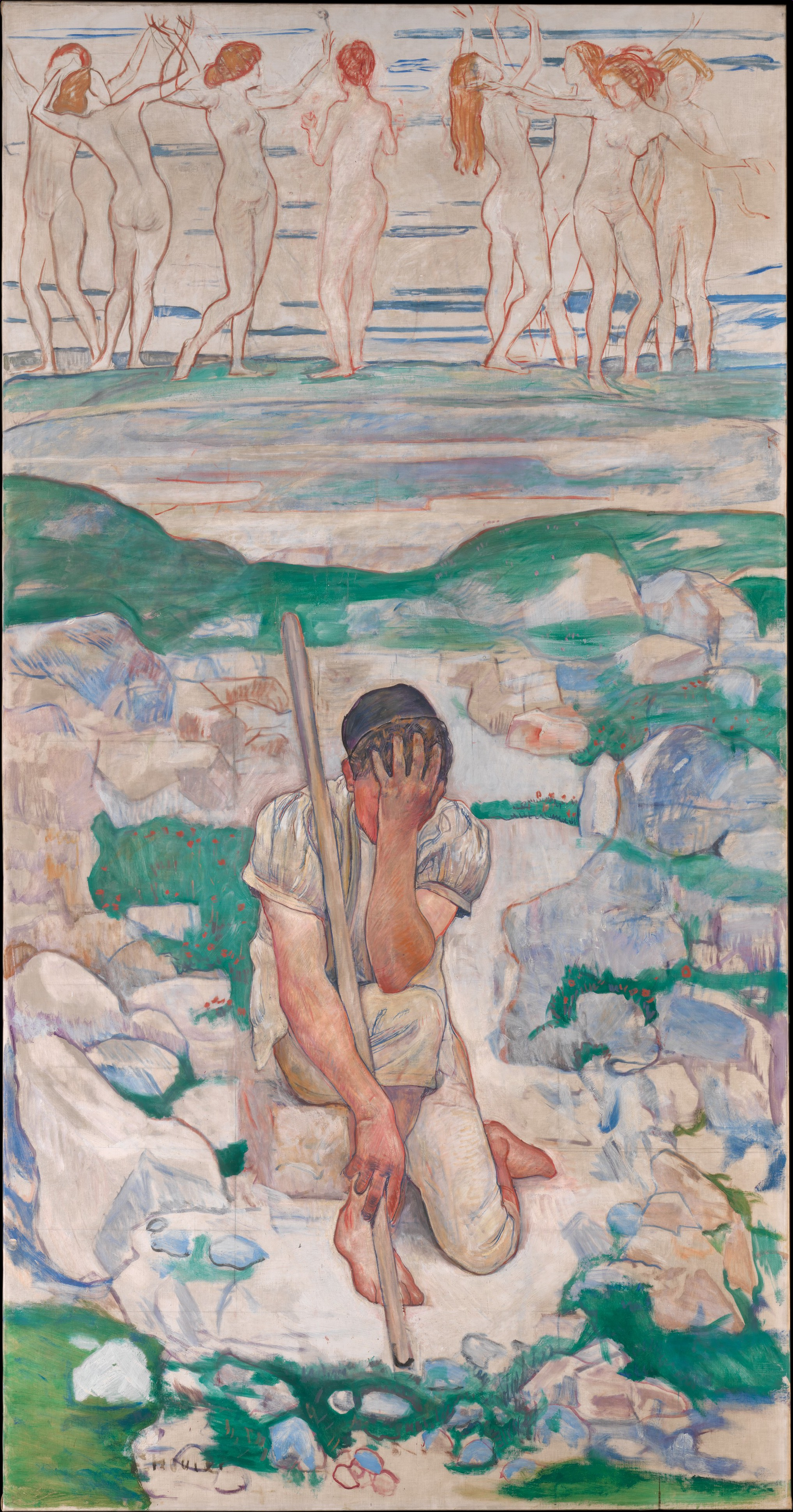
- Artist: Ferdinand Hodler
- Year: 1896 (formerly dated to 1893)
- Medium: Oil on canvas
- Dimensions: 250.2 cm × 130.5 cm (98.5 in × 51.4 in)
- Location: Metropolitan Museum of Art; New York
- Accession: 2013.1134

The Dream of the Shepherd (German: Der Traum des Hirten) is an oil on canvas painting by Swiss artist Ferdinand Hodler, from 1896. It depicts a shepherd kneeling in a field while dreaming of nude women.

== Description ==
Hodler painted Dream in 1896. Unlike his previous, more realist works, Dream shows Hodler's interest in symbolism.

Dream was first shown during the Swiss national exhibition in Geneva. Sources have commented that Hodler's submittance of Dream to the 1896 exhibition was possibly done to provoke the Swiss art community, noting that Hodler's rendering of copious nude figures in the painting may have been influenced by rejections of his earlier works as being too sexual. In addition, Hodler debuted the painting at the Théâtre du Sapajou in Geneva, possibly an intentional choice given the theater was associated with satire. According to the Met's description of Dream, the painting and situation surrounding its debut earned Hodler "considerable" notoriety.

The painting was originally owned by the Kunsthandlung Rath in Basel before being sold to a private collector in the 1920s. Dream was acquired by the Metropolitan Museum of Art in 2013 and remains in the Met's collection.
