= Ernst Flersheim =

Ernst Flersheim (born 1862; died in 1944 in Bergen-Belsen concentration camp) was a German Jewish art collector who was persecuted by the Nazis.

== Early life ==
Flersheim was born on 13 July 1862 in Frankfurt am Main. His parents were Louis Flersheim and Johanna Gütha Flersheim. He married Gertrud von Mayer (born 2 August 1872; died 13 September 1944 in Bergen Belsen). Both were arrested, deported and murdered by the Nazis.

== Art collection ==
The Flersheim's collection included Ferdinand Hodler's "Thunersee mit Niesen", "A Prayer before Supper" by Jan Toorop and "Procession in the Mountains" by Adolf Hölzel.

== Nazi-era ==
In May 1937, the Frankfurt auction house Hugo Helbing auctioned off the Flersheim collection and the couple fled to Amsterdam in the face of increasing anti-Semitic repression. In the Netherlands they were arrested and imprisoned. They were deported and died in the Bergen-Belsen concentration camp in 1944.

== Claims for restitution ==
After 1945, Edith Eberstadt (née Flersheim) made claims for restitution for artworks in the collection. A few paintings were located in private collections or public museums. Several restitutions or settlements took place. In May 2020, the Association for the Promotion of Fine Arts in Wiesbaden e. V. returned the painting "Procession in the Mountains" by Adolf Hölzel, which was on permanent loan to the Wiesbaden Museum, to the heirs of the Flersheim family.

The efforts by the Flersheim's grandson, Walter Eberstadt, to recover art works by the Dutch painter Jan Toorop are documented at the Leo Baeck Institute.

In 2008, the Dutch Restitutions Committee issued binding resolutions concerning several of the Flersheim claims for restitution.

== See also ==
- The Holocaust
- The Holocaust in the Netherlands
- List of claims for restitution for Nazi-looted art
