= René Auberjonois (painter) =

Swiss painter (1872–1957)

- Portrait de l'Artiste / Portrait of the Artist (1915–16); Oil on canvas, 64 × 53 cm
- Born: René Victor Auberjonois; 18 August 1872; Lausanne, Switzerland
- Died: 11 October 1957 (aged 85); Lausanne, Switzerland
- Education: Kensington School of Art, École nationale supérieure des Beaux-Arts
- Known for: Painting, graphic arts, illustration, caricature
- Movement: Post-Impressionism
- Spouses: Augusta Grenier (m. 1908; div. 1919) Marguerite Hélène Buvelot (m. 1922; div. 1929)
- Children: 2; including Fernand
- Relatives: René Murat Auberjonois (grandson); Rémy Auberjonois (great-grandson)

René Victor Auberjonois (18 August 1872 – 11 October 1957) was a Swiss post-impressionist painter and one of the leading Swiss artists of the 20th century.

== Biography ==
Born to wealthy parents, Auberjonois lived a jeunesse dorée, studying the classics, starting a banking apprenticeship and serving as a lieutenant of cavalry in the Swiss Army. After dabbling in caricature and music during a first trip to England, he decided to become a painter and enrolled in the Kensington School of Art. In 1896, he moved to Paris to study with Luc-Olivier Merson and at the École des Beaux-Arts. His budding French career was noted in Switzerland, and after the turn of the century, he made the acquaintance of fellow painter Ferdinand Hodler, conductor Ernest Ansermet and writer Charles Ferdinand Ramuz. Auberjonois would later create numerous book illustrations and stage designs for Ramuz and for other artists, including sets and costumes for Ramuz's collaboration with Igor Stravinsky on L'histoire du soldat.

In 1908, he moved to Jouxtens-Mézery in Switzerland and married Augusta Grenier, whom he then divorced in 1919. They had two sons – Maurice (b. 1909) and Fernand (1910–2004). Fernand would become a renowned journalist in the U.S. and his son René an actor. The support of a patron, the collector Hans Graber, helped Auberjonois during the 1910s, while in the 1920s he began to acquire a certain public reputation through expositions and prominent commissions. A second marriage in 1922 with Marguerite Hélène Buvelot fell apart in 1929, as Auberjonois recognised his inability to reconcile his work with a family life.

After the death of his mother and the sale of his family house in 1929, Auberjonois had a small house built in Pully next to that of Ramuz, which he occupied in 1933–34 until quarrels with Ramuz caused him to move out. In 1935, he accepted a commission to paint murals for the abbey of Dézaley despite constant doubts about his own skills – he did not risk painting directly on the wall, as this required particular speed and precision. The Belle du Dézaley mural was very poorly received, causing Auberjonois to become a virtual recluse in his Lausanne studio throughout the 1930s, interrupted only by a brief liaison with his model Simone Hauert.

Despite health problems and Auberjonois' own persistent dissatisfaction with his work, the 1940s were his most productive years, and public recognition of his œuvre increased. Dispirited by his friend Ramuz' death in 1947 and preoccupied with his age and poor health, he afterwards retreated more and more from the art scene. Yet he lived to see his work gain international recognition at the first Documenta in Kassel (1955), two years before his death.

== Work ==
After beginning his career in France as a Realist, Auberjonois began to employ Post-Impressionist techniques after 1903. His subject matter was mostly that of his native Vaud, such as natural landscapes, bathing women or rustic still lifes. In the early 1930s, his paintings became progressively simpler in an Expressionist style close to that of Modigliani. The personal crisis caused by the polemic over his murals is reflected in the use of fewer and darker colours after 1936. Afterwards, Auberjonois realised some of his most significant works as a colourist inspired by Delacroix and then Rembrandt, including Hommage à l'Olympia (1943), Baigneuses dans la forêt (1944, Museum zu Allerheiligen, Schaffhausen), Clown et petite écuyère (1946), Portrait de l'artiste (1948, Kunsthaus Aarau), Fille dans la chambre rouge (1948, Museum zu Allerheiligen), Nature morte au crâne (1950) and L'arène jaune (1953–54).

Auberjonois' paintings reflect a slow maturation, reaching their artistic apogee at around 1948 when he was 76 years old. Often disappointed with himself, he destroyed many of his works. His drawings, both formal studies and caricatures, are largely independent of his pictorial work. That work is both modern in the deformation it imposes upon nature, and conservative in its choice of subjects.

== Impact and legacy ==
Despite now appearing as a leading and emblematic figure in Swiss art after Ferdinand Hodler, Auberjonois had no clear successors and few students in his time. He exerted considerable influence, however, through his art criticism published in the French-speaking Swiss press. His artistic reception in his own region, the Romandie, was poor during his lifetime, and his recognition was mostly gained in the German-speaking part of Switzerland and abroad.

Significant works of René Auberjonois are on public display at the Aargauer Kunsthaus, the Kunstmuseum Basel, the Cantonal Museum of Fine Arts in Lausanne, the Kunsthaus Zürich and the Werner Coninx-Stiftung. His work Nature morte (soleils, table de jardin verte), 1946, is in the Museo Cantonale d'Arte of Lugano.
