= Ferdinand Hodler =

Swiss painter (1853–1918)

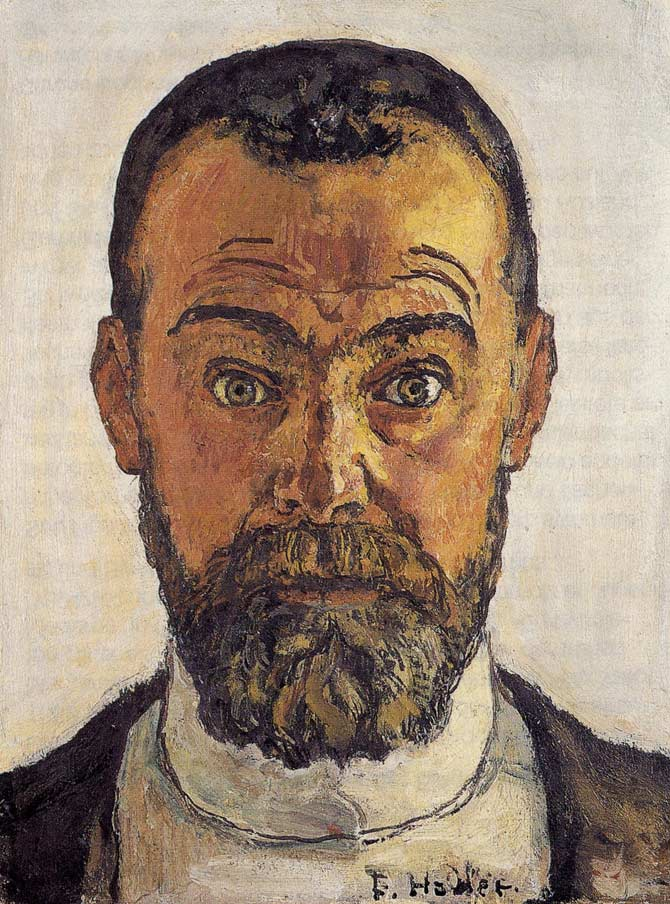
- Self-portrait, 1912
- Born: March 14, 1853; Bern, Switzerland
- Died: May 19, 1918 (aged 65); Geneva, Switzerland
- Known for: painting
- Movement: Symbolism

Signature
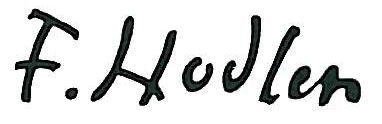

Ferdinand Hodler (March 14, 1853 – May 19, 1918) is one of the best-known Swiss painters of the nineteenth century. His early works were portraits, landscapes, and genre paintings in a realistic style. Later, he adopted a personal form of Symbolism which he called "parallelism".

== Early life ==
Hodler was born in Bern, the eldest of six children. His father, Johannes Hodler, made a meager living as a carpenter; his mother, Margarete (née Neukomm), was from a peasant family. By the time Hodler was eight years old, he had lost his father and two younger brothers to tuberculosis. His mother remarried, to a decorative painter named Gottlieb Schüpach, who had five children from a previous marriage. The birth of additional children brought the size of Hodler's family to thirteen.

The family's finances were poor, and the nine-year-old Hodler was put to work assisting his stepfather in painting signs and other commercial projects. After the death of his mother from tuberculosis in 1867, Hodler was sent to Thun to apprentice with a local painter, Ferdinand Sommer. From Sommer, Hodler learned the craft of painting conventional Alpine landscapes, typically copied from prints, which he sold in shops and to tourists.

== Career ==
In 1871, at the age of 18, Hodler travelled on foot to Geneva to start his career as a painter. He attended science lectures at the Collège de Genève, and in the museum there he copied paintings by Alexandre Calame. In 1873 he became a student of Barthélemy Menn, and investigated Dürer’s the 16th-century writings on proportions.

He made a trip to Basel in 1875, where he studied the paintings of Hans Holbein—especially Dead Christ in the Tomb, which influenced Hodler's many treatments of the theme of death. He travelled to Madrid in 1878, where he stayed for several months and studied the works of masters such as Titian, Poussin, and Velázquez in the Museo del Prado.

In 1880–81, Hodler painted Self-Portrait (The Angry One), in which his expression displayed exasperation at his continued poverty and lack of recognition. It was ridiculed when displayed in Geneva, prompting Hodler's remark to a friend that the Swiss "will not understand me until they see I have been understood elsewhere". He submitted the painting to the Paris Salon, where it was his first work accepted, although it was ignored by the critics.

The works of Hodler's early maturity consisted of landscapes, figure compositions, and portraits, treated with a vigorous realism. In 1884, Hodler met Augustine Dupin (1852–1909), who became his companion and model for the next several years. Their son, Hector Hodler—who would found the World Esperanto Association in 1908—was born in 1887.

Hodler was married twice. From 1889 until their divorce in 1891, Hodler was married to Bertha Stucki, who is depicted in his painting, Poetry (1897, Museum für Gestaltung, Zürich). In 1898, Hodler married Berthe Jacques (1868–1957), whom he had met in 1894.

=== Parallelism ===
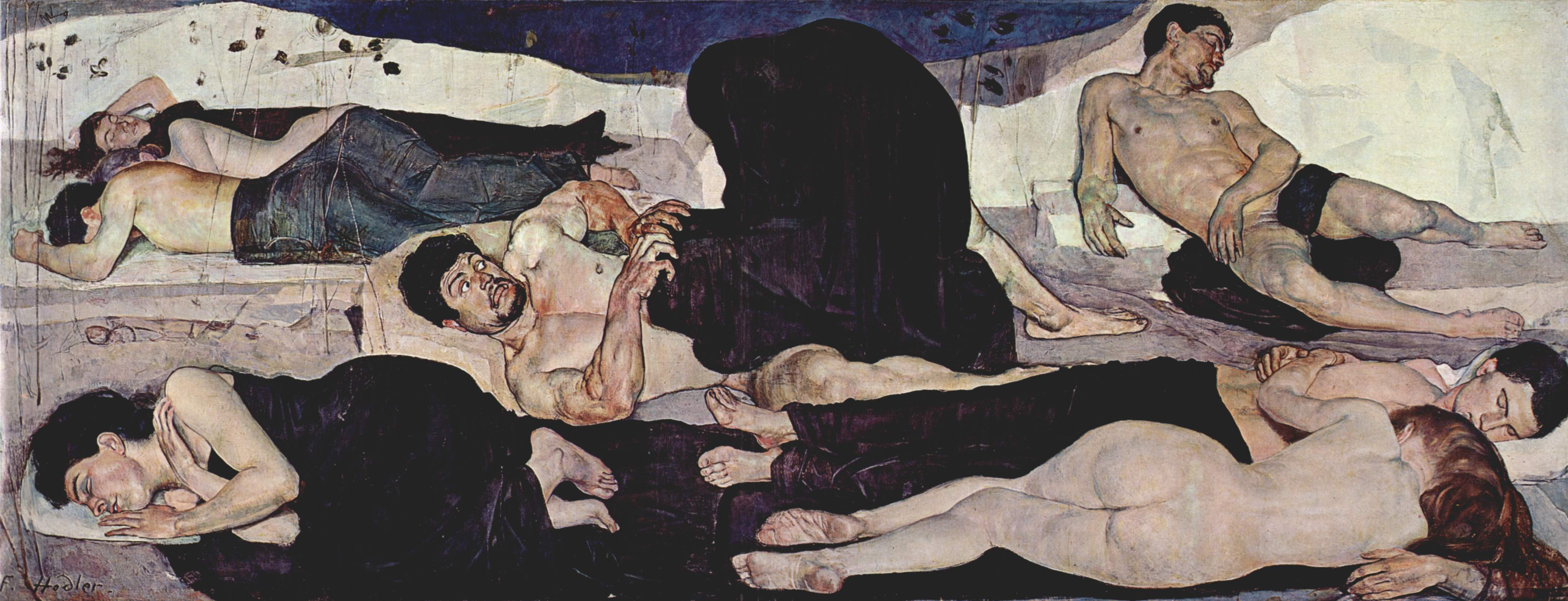
Night, 1889–1890, Bern, Kunstmuseum

In the last decade of the nineteenth century his work evolved to combine influences from several genres including Symbolism and Art Nouveau. In 1890 he completed Night, a work that marked Hodler's turn toward symbolist imagery. It depicts several recumbent figures, all of them relaxed in sleep except for an agitated man who is menaced by a figure shrouded in black, which Hodler intended as a symbol of death. When Hodler submitted the painting to the Beaux-Arts exhibition in Geneva in February 1891, the entwined nude figures created a scandal; the mayor deemed the work obscene, and it was withdrawn from the show. A few months later, Hodler exhibited Night in Paris at the Salon of 1891, where it attracted favorable attention and was championed by Puvis de Chavannes and Rodin.

Hodler developed a style he called "parallelism" that emphasized the symmetry and rhythm he believed formed the basis of human society. In paintings such as The Chosen One (1893), groupings of figures are symmetrically arranged in poses suggestive of ritual or dance. Hodler conceived of woman as the embodiment of the desire for harmony with nature, while a child or youth represented innocence and vitality. In Eurythmy (1895), the theme of death is represented by a row of five men in ceremonial robes walking in an ordered procession on a path strewn with fallen leaves. Hodler first made his conception of "parallelism" public in his 1897 lecture manuscript La Mission de l'artiste. Since then, his theory has been a highly regarded phenomenon in the art world and in research, but today it is no longer entirely uncontroversial.

Hodler painted a number of large-scale historical paintings, often with patriotic themes. In 1897 he accepted a commission to paint a series of large frescoes for the Weapons Room of the Schweizerisches Landesmuseum in Zurich. The compositions he proposed, including The Battle of Marignan which depicted a battle that the Swiss lost, were controversial for their imagery and style, and Hodler was not permitted to execute the frescoes until 1900.

In 1900 Hodler exhibited three major works—Night, Eurythmy, and Day (1900)—at the Exposition Universelle in Paris, where they won awards. He was invited to join both the Berlin Secession and the Vienna Secession groups. In 1904 he showed 31 works in Vienna, which brought him enhanced recognition and a sales success that finally eased his poverty. Hodler's work after 1900 took on an expressionist aspect with strongly coloured and geometrical figures. Landscapes were pared down to essentials, sometimes consisting of a jagged wedge of land between water and sky. The art historian Sepp Kern says that in Lake Geneva (c. 1911), "the bands formed by the shoreline, the mountains and their reflection on the surface of the water, together with the three-part rhythmic frieze of clouds, have been composed to form a cosmological whole."

In November 1900 Federal Councilor Zemp, the president of the postal and railway department, launched a design competition for a new Swiss postage stamp. Hodler anonymously sent a design showing a Freiburg herder, which was used 35 years later in the Swiss Pro Patria-Block of 1936.

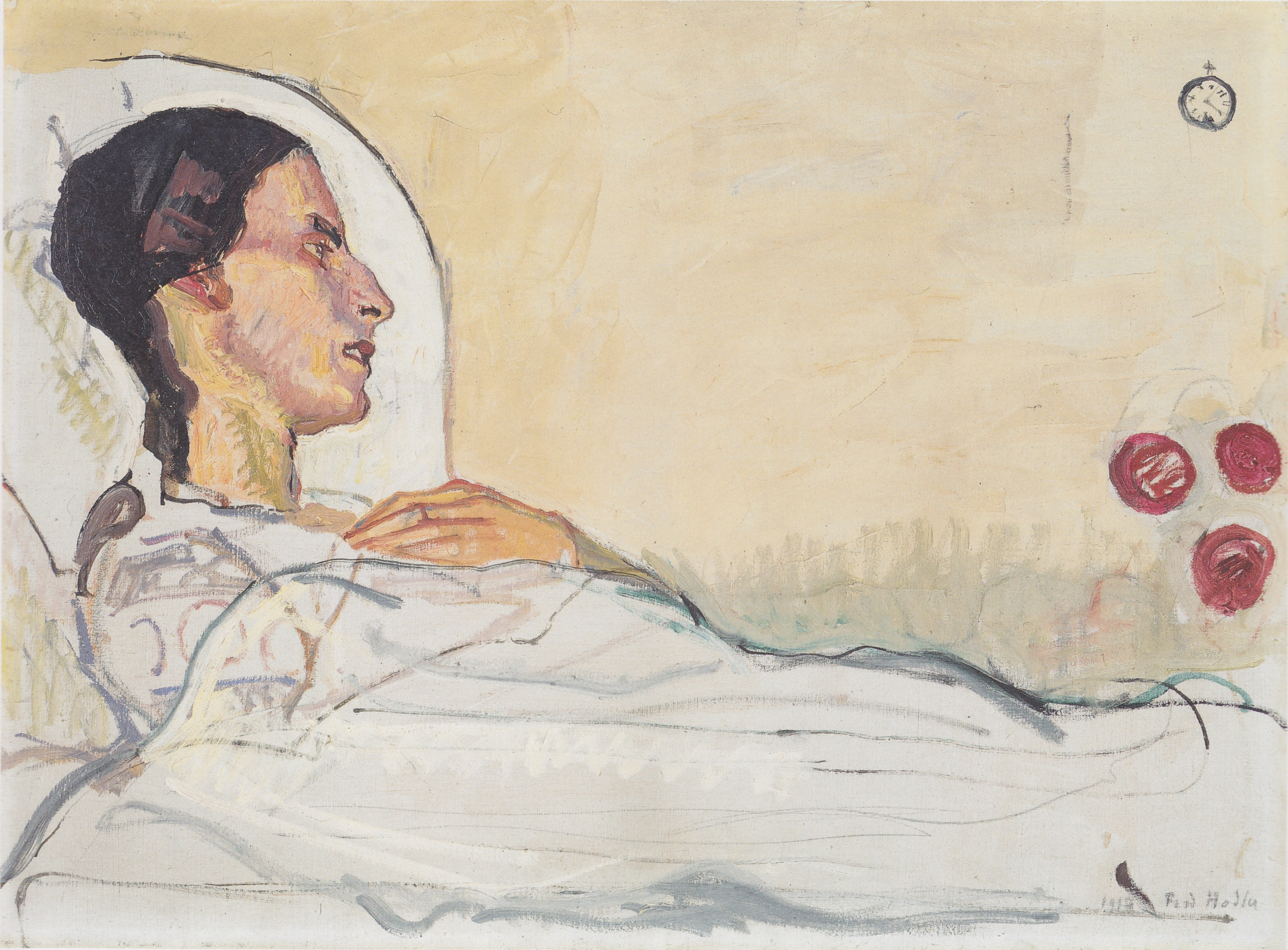
Valentine Godé-Darel on Her Sickbed, 1914, oil on canvas

In 1908, Hodler met Valentine Godé-Darel, who became his mistress, although he continued to live with his second wife. In 1913, Godé-Darel was diagnosed with a gynecological cancer, and the many hours Hodler spent by her bedside resulted in a remarkable series of paintings documenting her decline from the disease. In January 1914, three months after the birth of their daughter, Pauline Hodler, Godé-Darel was subjected to an operation for the cancer. In June 1914, she underwent a second operation. Her death in January 1915 affected Hodler greatly. He occupied himself with work on a series of about 20 introspective self-portraits that date from 1916.

In 1914 he signed a petition of intellectuals from Geneva condemning the German atrocities conducted using artillery against the Cathedral of Rheims. His Swiss and German friends tried to compel him to withdraw the signature, but he refused. In retaliation for this, he was expelled from several German art associations.

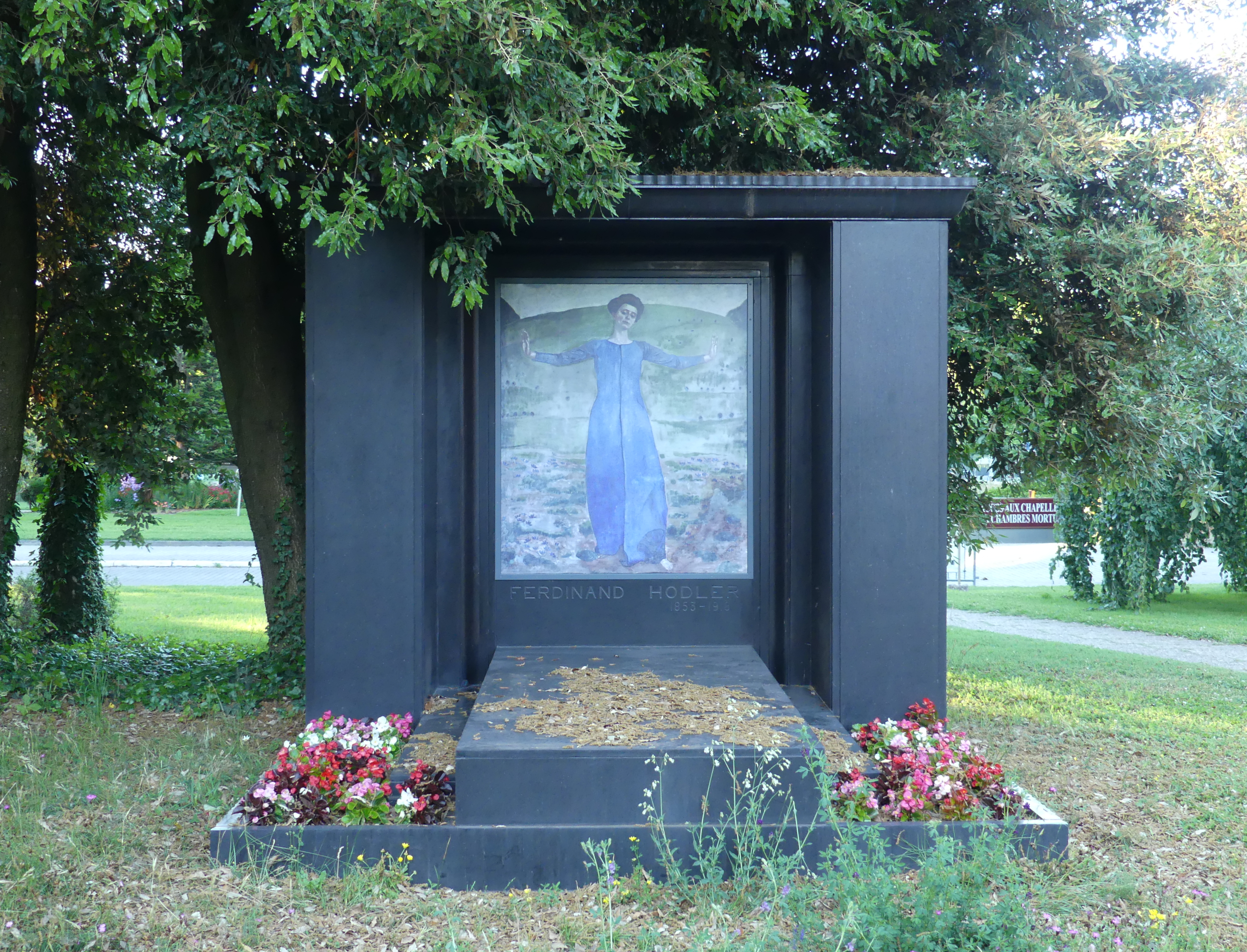
Hodler's grave at the Cimetière de Saint Georges in Geneva

By 1917, his health was deteriorating. In November of that year he became ill with pulmonary edema, and told his son he was considering suicide. Although mostly bedridden, he painted a number of views of Geneva from his balcony in the months before his death on May 19, 1918.

== Legacy ==
In his time, Hodler's mural-sized paintings of patriotic themes were especially admired. According to Sepp Kern, Hodler "helped revitalize the art of monumental wall painting, and his work is regarded as embodying the Swiss federal identity."

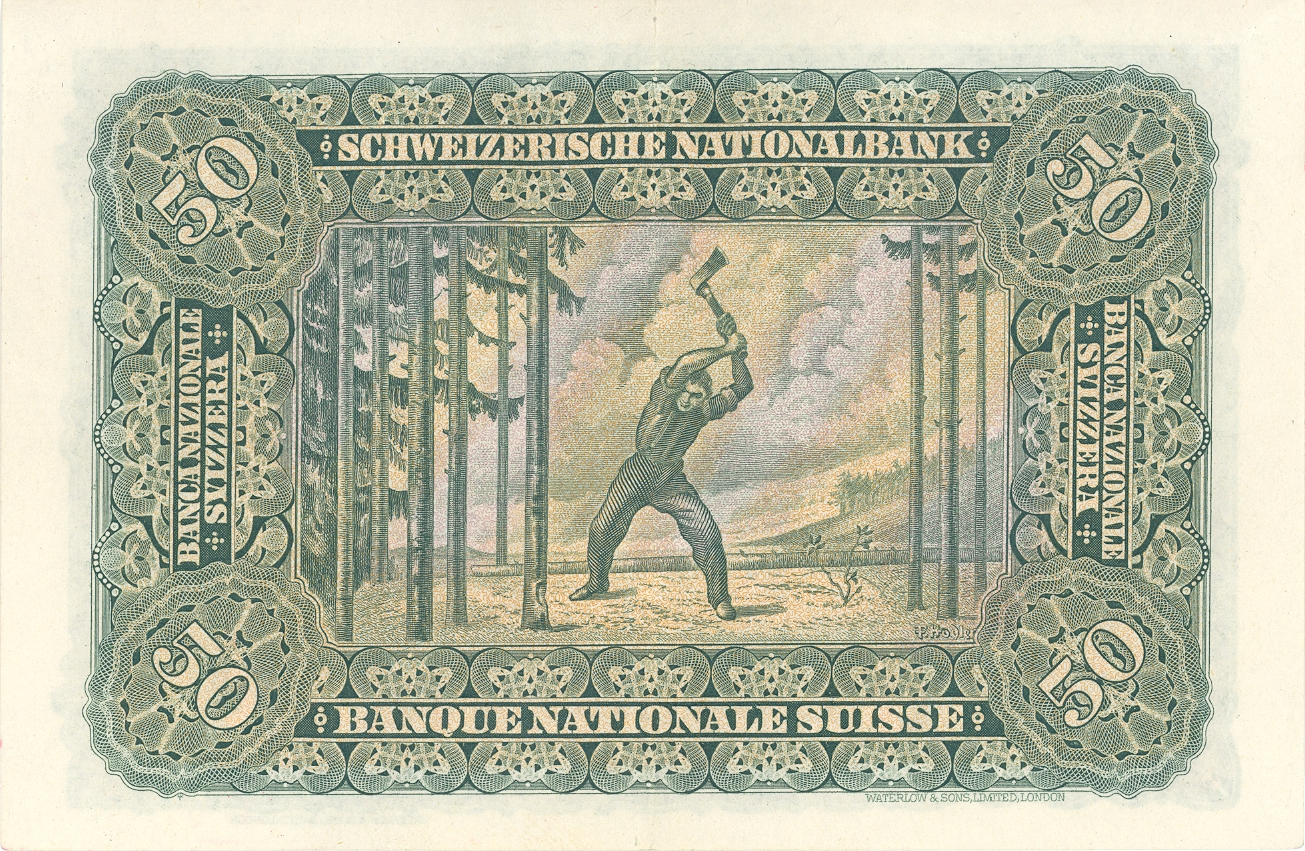
CHF 50 banknote from 1911 Series Two, Der Holzfäller by Hodler

Many of Hodler's best-known paintings are scenes in which characters are engaged in everyday activities, such as the famous woodcutter (Der Holzfäller, 1910, Musée d'Orsay, Paris). In 1908, the Swiss National Bank commissioned Hodler to create two designs for new the 1911 Series Two release of the banknotes of the Swiss franc. His designs were controversial: rather than portraits of famous men, Hodler chose to depict a woodcutter (on the note for 50 Swiss francs) and a reaper (on the note for 100 Swiss francs).

Much of Hodler's work is in public collections in Switzerland. Other collections holding major works include the Musée d'Orsay in Paris, the Metropolitan Museum of Art in New York, and the Art Institute of Chicago.

== Controversies concerning Nazi looting and restitution claims ==
Many of Hodler's collectors were German Jews who were persecuted under the Nazis from 1933 to 1945. As a result, concern has been expressed when artworks by Hodler turned up after WWII with gaps in the ownership history. When a painting Lied aus der Ferne that Polish-born German-Jewish industrialist and art collector Max Meirowsky was forced to sell in 1938 turned up in the collection of Swiss politician Christoph Blocher, it set off a debate about Nazi looted art in Switzerland.

The German Lost Art Foundation lists 37 works by Hodler.

=== Lake Thun and the Stockhorn Mountains ===
One of Hodler's most repeatedly painted subjects was the Stockhorn range as seen from across Lake Thun in Switzerland, with the Swiss Institute for Art Research (SIK-ISEA) counting thirty-three known versions painted between 1905 and 1913. One version, painted c. 1913 and now belonging to the Simon und Charlotte Frick Foundation, has been claimed by the heirs of the Jewish art collector Max Silberberg, who was murdered in the Holocaust. According to Christie's, a related 1910 painting of the Niesen from across Lake Thun, Thunersee mit Niesen, was spoliated as a result of Nazi persecution from Ernst Flersheim of Frankfurt am Main, and sold by Galerie Nathan of Zurich to a private collector, then later sold in cooperation with Flersheim’s heirs.

== Gallery ==
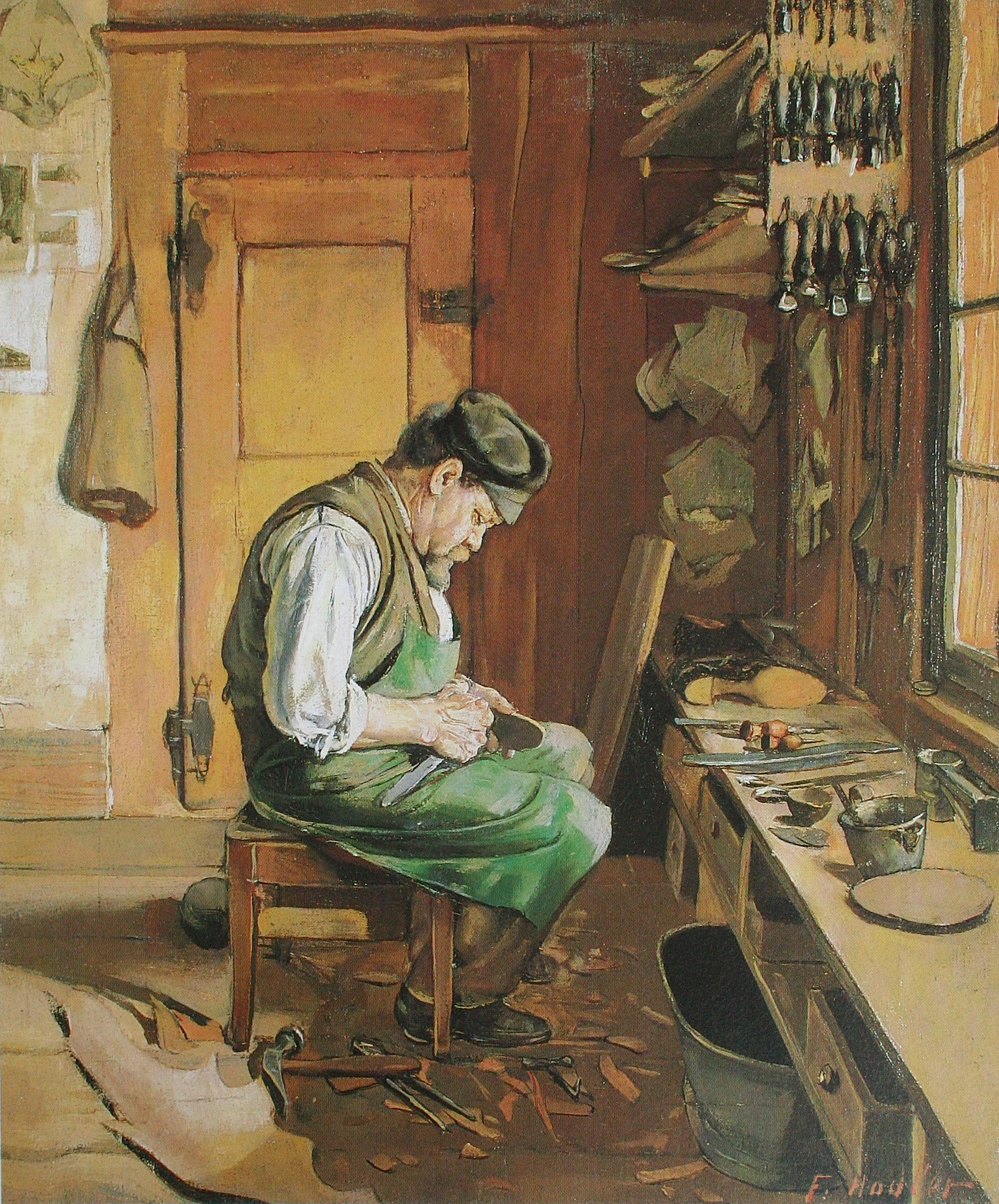
The Shoemaker, 1878

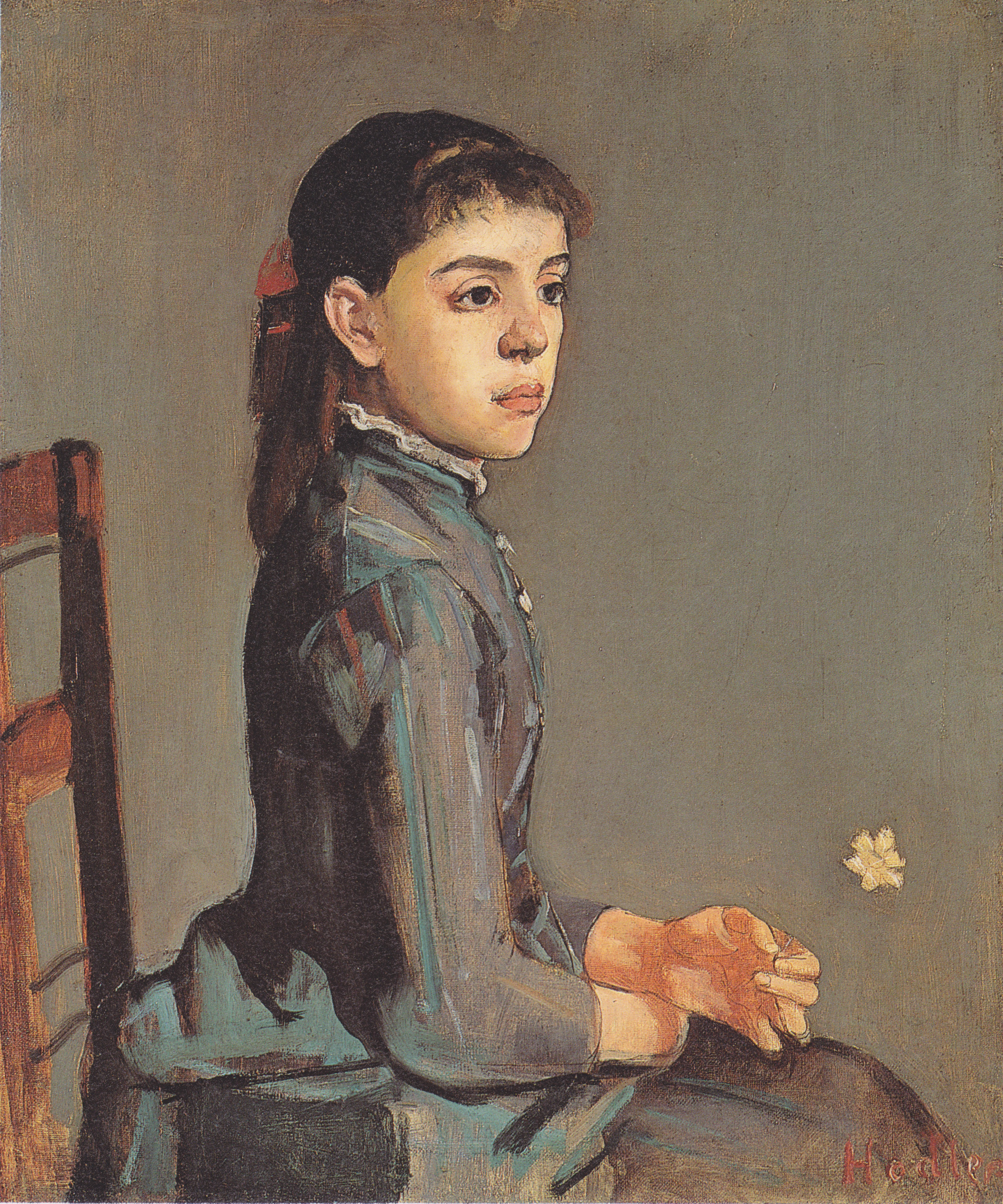
Portrait of Louise-Delphine Duchosal, 1885

Der Buchenwald (1885) (i.e. The Beech Forest)

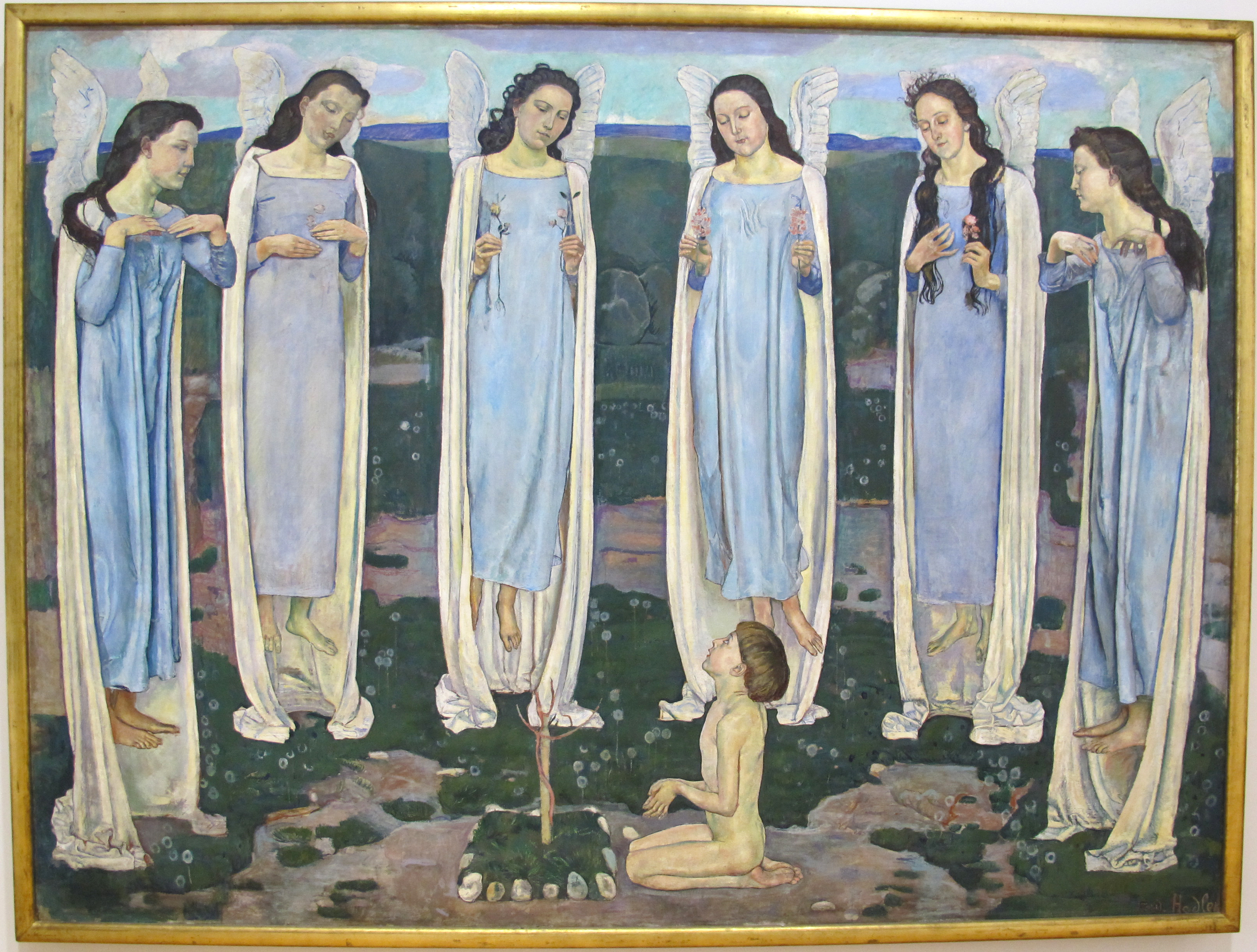
The Chosen One, 1893

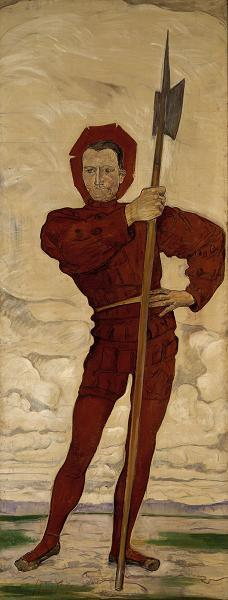
The Halberdier, 1895, Dallas Museum of Art

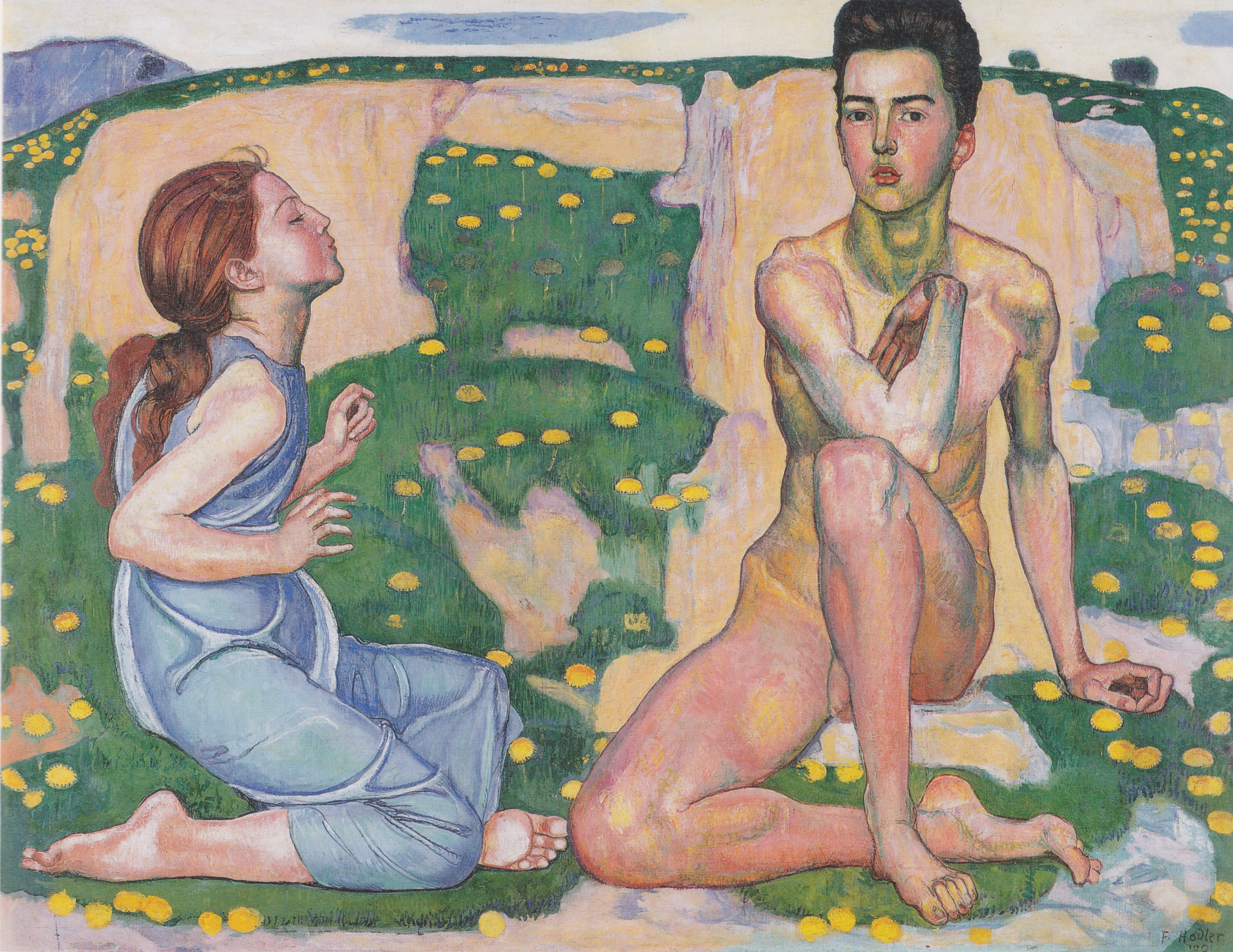
Spring, 1901

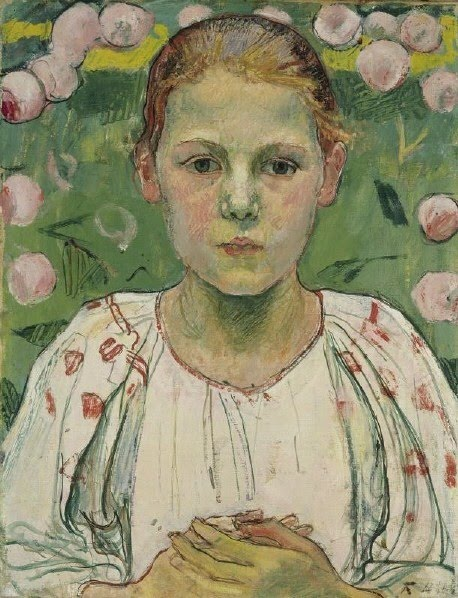
Portrait of Baronin Maria von Bach, 1904

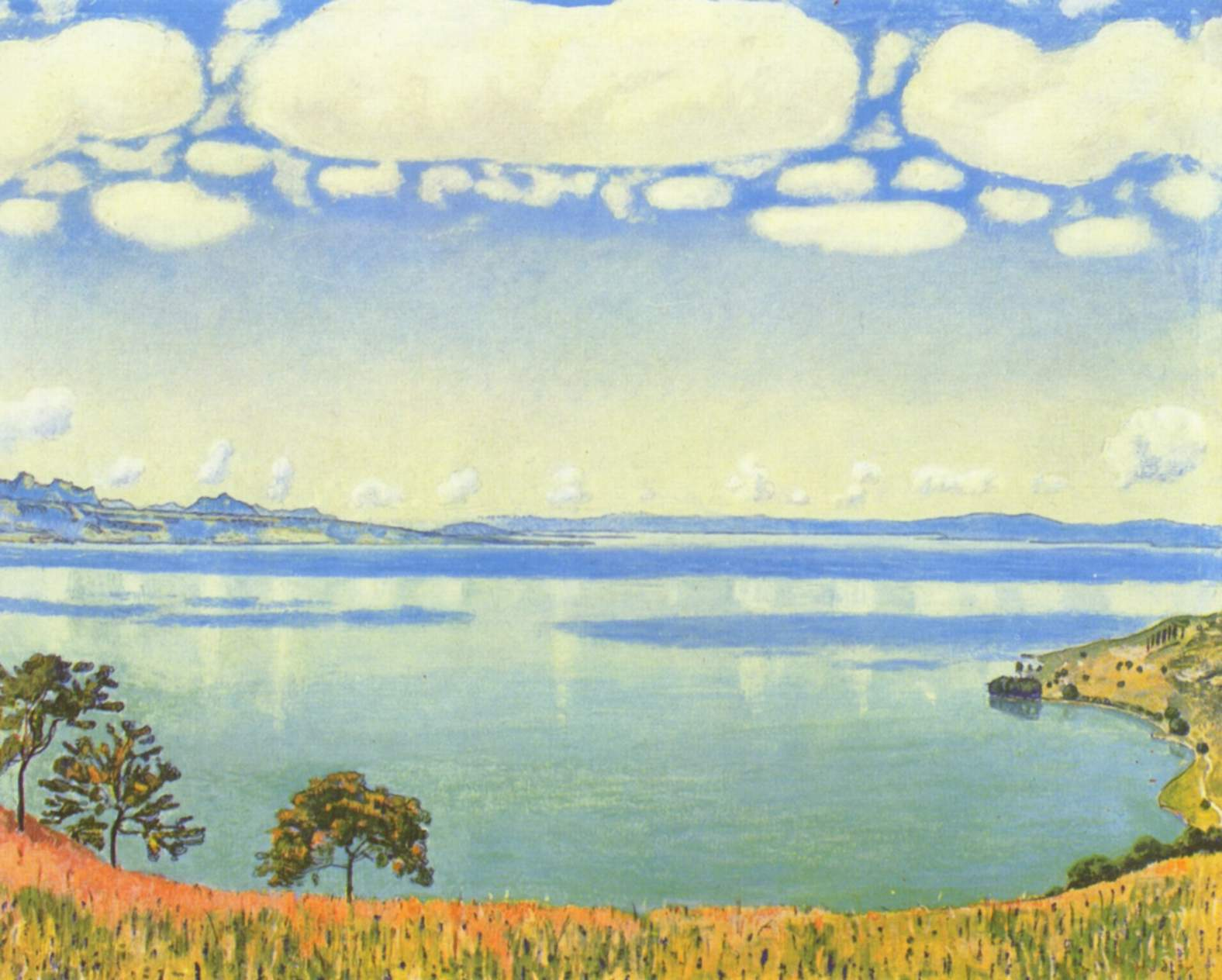
Lake Geneva as seen from Chexbres, 1905

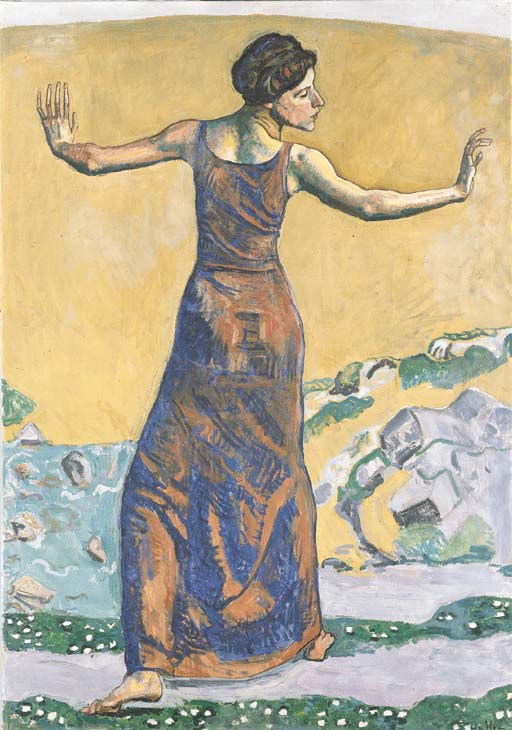
Joyous Woman, 1911

Self-portrait, 1916

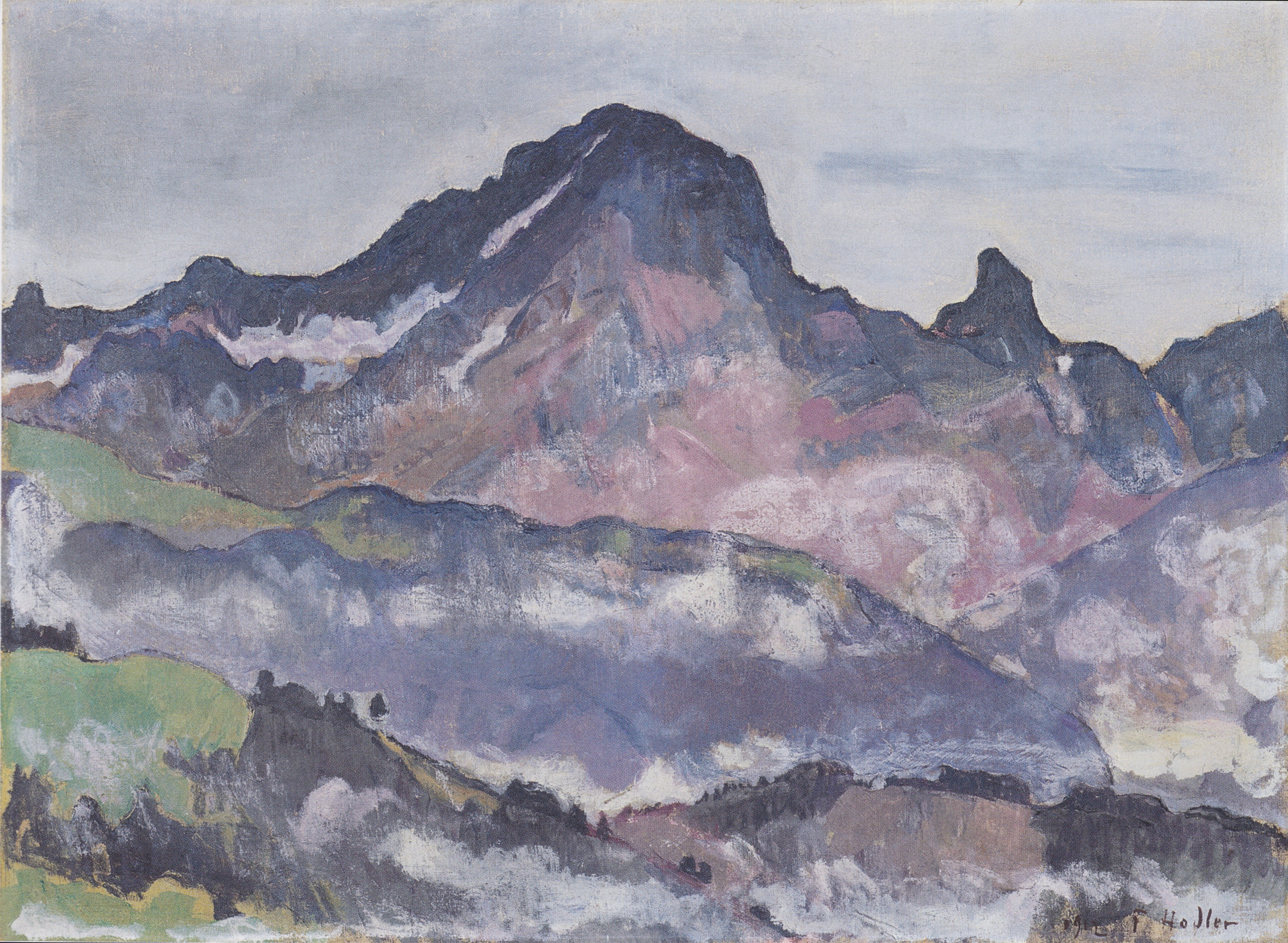
Le Grand Muveran, 1912

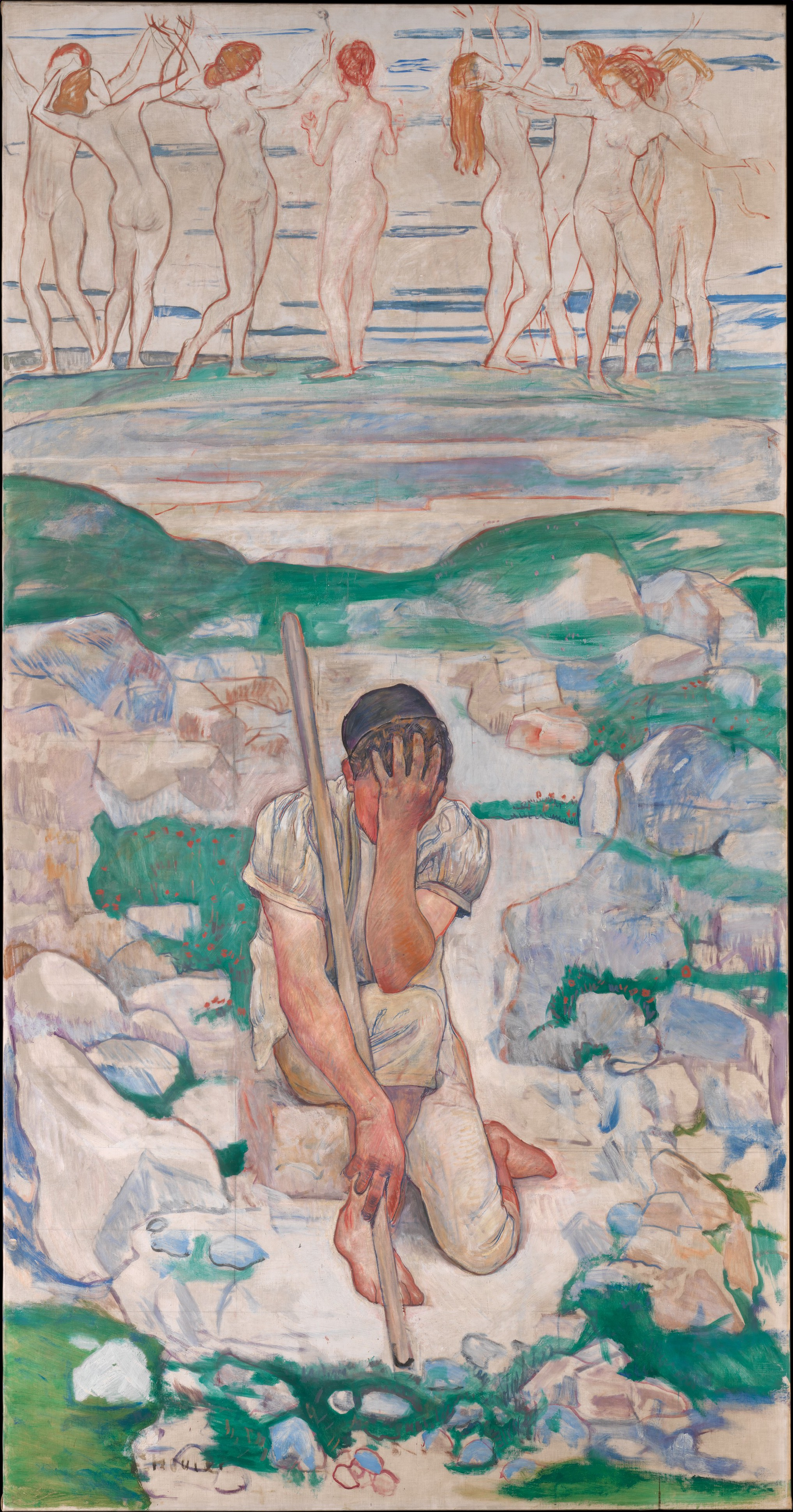
The Dream of the Shepherd, 1896
