= The Wheel of Darkness =

Novel by Douglas Preston and Lincoln Child

- Author: Douglas Preston, Lincoln Child
- Language: English
- Series: Aloysius Pendergast
- Genre: Thriller
- Publisher: Grand Central Publishing
- Publication date: August 28, 2007
- Publication place: United States
- Media type: Print, e-book, audiobook
- Pages: 400 pp.
- ISBN: 0-446-58141-0
- OCLC: 131068990
- Preceded by: The Book of the Dead
- Followed by: Cemetery Dance

The Wheel of Darkness is a novel by Douglas Preston and Lincoln Child released on August 28, 2007 by Grand Central Publishing. This is the eighth book in the Special Agent Pendergast series. It entered The New York Times Best Seller list at number two on September 16, 2007, and remained on the list for five weeks.

== Plot summary ==
This novel picks up shortly following the events depicted in The Book of the Dead.

Agent Pendergast and his ward, Constance Greene, are studying in Tibet with Buddhist monks; they are recuperating from the events depicted in the novel The Book of the Dead. An artifact—a Tibetan Mandala that turns people evil if they see it—is stolen from the monastery, and the monks ask if Pendergast can retrieve it. Pendergast pursues the thief and artifact through China, Rome, and London. He finds that the original thief was killed and the artifact stolen by someone else. He and Constance track the killer to a new luxury ocean liner, the Britannia, which is headed to New York City.

Aboard the ship, Pendergast quickly eliminates all but a few possible suspects. He coerces the ships' guards to help him in exchange for helping them stop cheaters at the casino on the ship. The killer is murdering random people on the ship and everyone is panicking. There is also a mysterious shadow thing being sighted and causing inevitable panic. The captain refuses to go to the nearest port, which creates more problems.

Fearing the loss of a life over the loss of profit, the crew mutinies and puts a female commander in charge. Pendergast locates the artifact's thief. However, he actually looks at it and undergoes a mental change. It brings out his "evil side"; where he doesn't care about anyone but himself and he thinks that humans are pathetic and should be cleansed. Meanwhile, the new captain has tricked the crew out of the bridge and locked it down. She aims for 'Carrion Rock', a land mass that will easily sink the ship. It is later revealed she herself had looked at the artifact and had decided to kill everyone on board as revenge for not being promoted to what she believes is her rightful position.

The crew plead for mercy from the old captain; he has the codes needed to unlock the ship. He leaves them to their fate. The shadow thing is revealed to be a Tulpa or thought form, established by the mental energy from the passenger that possesses the stolen artifact. It attacks Pendergast as ordered, intended to drain from him all who he is and most of his body mass. Pendergast retreats into the carefully structured order of his own mind. Deep inside, he converses with a simulacrum of his deceased brother, Diogenes. He encourages the agent to fight back. Pendergast does so, sending the being on a course against those who had viewed the artifact. In the course of this, it burns away the evil influence it has on him. It attacks the ship's captain killing her; she manages to open the bridge door before she dies. The crew steers away from Carrion Rock saving the ship's survivors; previous maneuvers had left about two hundred dead due to damage.

It is then revealed that this was an elaborate plan of the monks to find the reincarnation of the 'leader' of the temple. They reveal a prophecy that the guardian of the 'leader' will bring the artifact back to them after it has been stolen. The 'leader' turns out to be Constance's child (from when Diogenes seduced her) which she did not abort even though she had planned to.

== See also ==
- Immured anchorite
- Mandala
- Object E8
