= Cold Vengeance (novel) =

Book by Douglas Preston and Lincoln Child

- Hardcover edition
- Author: Douglas Preston; Lincoln Child
- Language: English
- Series: Pendergast
- Genre: Thriller
- Publisher: Grand Central Publishing
- Publication date: August 2, 2011
- Publication place: United States
- Media type: Print, e-book, audiobook
- Pages: 368
- ISBN: 0-446-55498-7
- Preceded by: Fever Dream
- Followed by: Two Graves

Cold Vengeance is a thriller novel by Douglas Preston and Lincoln Child. It was released on August 2, 2011 by Grand Central Publishing. This is the eleventh installment in the Special Agent Pendergast series and also the second novel in the Helen trilogy. The preceding novel is Fever Dream.

== Plot summary ==
The conspiracy that murdered his wife is no more, but Pendergast will not rest until every last person involved is brought to justice. Chasing the final conspirator across the moors of Scotland, Pendergast stumbles into a far greater danger than he ever knew existed: the Covenant ("Der Bund" in German), a network of Nazis and Nazi sympathizers that have retreated from public view to influence events on a global scale.

== Plot ==
Pendergast and Judson are hunting in Scotland. They each try to kill the other. Esterhazy shoots Pendergast in the chest and leaves him for dead, sinking into quicksand. When he returns with police, they drag the swamp but do not find Pendergast's body.

Constance is taken to the hospital for the criminally insane, assigned to the room where Pendergast's Aunt Cornelia was hospitalized.

Corrie Swanson visits D'Agosta, informing Vinnie that AP missed a scheduled lunch meeting. In Scotland, an open verdict is returned from the inquest, freeing Judson to leave. He departs, disguises himself, and travels to a town near where Pendergast disappeared.

Vinnie heads to Scotland to search for Pendergast. He gets lost in the bogs near a house whose inhabitants might have information. He freezes, just as he spots lights nearby.

June Brodie and her husband, living in Malfourche, are interviewed by a local reporter. A German living in Guatemala is sent the newspaper clipping. He calls a German associate to investigate and execute "wet work." The assassin finds the Brodies, learns their real story, and kills them.

Esterhazy searches for Pendergast, who is disguised as a Welsh clergyman. He lures Esterhazy to a churchyard. Judson begins his story, starting in 1945, but they are interrupted by genealogists. They exchange shots, and Esterhazy escapes in his van.

Esterhazy meets with a member of the Covenant (Der Bund), who tells Judson to handle Pendergast himself. After talking with a homeless person at a soup kitchen, he decides to target a woman close to Pendergast.

Ned Betterton, the local Louisiana reporter, learns about the Brodie murders and the events at Spanish Island from the end of Fever Dream.

Pendergast has his wife's body exhumed, believing she is alive and wondering who is in her coffin. He conducts a search of Esterhazy's Savannah home, finding nothing.

Dr. Beaufort, whom Pendergast has known since childhood, tests the remains. He states the evidence points to Helen, but Pendergast rejects this. The doctor notes that the mitochondrial DNA test finds Helen shared a female ancestor with a Nazi doctor, Faust, born in 1908 and died in 1978.

Pendergast coerces a general in charge of a database to search for Helen. He finds nothing past her alleged death by a lion, insisting she must be dead.

Pendergast learns Helen was born in Brazil, her native language was Portuguese, and her great-grandfather was a Nazi. Meanwhile, Judson pretends to be a psychiatrist who previously treated Constance, claiming she has amnesia to explain why she does not recognize him. He convinces her he is there on Pendergast's behalf and offers to help her escape, intending to kidnap her as leverage.

Esterhazy kidnaps Constance during an offsite outing, tricking Dr. Felder. Betterton tracks the killers to a yacht, the Vergeltung, but they kill him. The Covenant lures Pendergast to the yacht where they hold Constance, making him believe he found them. Constance sent a note with details to a woman, who took it to the police, but the woman is actually a member of the Covenant.

Corrie Swanson finds the house where they held Constance. In her note, Constance suggests her baby is alive. On the yacht, they throw Constance overboard, forcing Pendergast to surrender. Esterhazy, fearing for his life, kills the leader, Falkoner, and several Covenant members. Pendergast damages the boat, and he, Judson, and Constance escape on a tender.

Pendergast realizes Judson killed Helen's twin sister in her place. The sister was intellectually disabled, and he needed a body to convince the Nazis Helen was dead. He promises to bring Helen to Pendergast in Central Park.

Corrie searches the old house, finding evidence of the Nazis closing their operations. She places documents in her knapsack. Hearing noises, she hides in a closet but is discovered by a member of the Covenant. Pendergast and Helen reunite but are ambushed. Judson is killed, Helen is taken, Proctor is shot, and Pendergast is wounded.
