= The Book of the Dead (novel) =

2007 novel by Douglas Preston and Lincoln Child

- Hardcover edition
- Author: Douglas Preston; Lincoln Child
- Cover artist: Stanislaw Fernandes
- Language: English
- Series: Diogenes Trilogy, Aloysius Pendergast
- Genre: Thriller
- Publisher: Warner Books
- Publication date: July 1, 2007
- Publication place: United States
- Media type: Print, e-book, audiobook
- Pages: 640 pp.
- ISBN: 0-446-61850-0
- OCLC: 144811105
- Preceded by: Dance of Death
- Followed by: The Wheel of Darkness

The Book of the Dead is a novel by Douglas Preston and Lincoln Child published on July 1, 2007, by Warner Books. This is the seventh book in the Special Agent Pendergast series. Also, it is the third and final installment to the trilogy concentrating on Pendergast and his relationship with Lieutenant Vincent D'Agosta in their pursuit to stop Pendergast's brother, Diogenes.

Preston and Child call these books the Diogenes trilogy. The three books in the trilogy start with Brimstone in 2004 and continue with Dance of Death in 2005. This final book was released on May 30, 2006, and has been on the New York Times Best Seller list, reaching as high as #4 on the list.

== Synopsis ==
An FBI agent, rotting away in a high-security prison for a murder he did not commit.

His brilliant, psychotic brother, about to perpetrate a horrific crime.

A young woman with an extraordinary past, on the edge of a violent breakdown.

An ancient Egyptian tomb with an enigmatic curse, about to be unveiled at a celebrity-studded New York gala.

== Plot ==
Someone sends the pulverized remains of all of the fancy, colored diamonds that were stolen a month ago to the museum. Bill Smithback is able to discover the truth, and writes a front-page story that puts the New York Museum of Natural History in hot water.

To help deflect, Hugo Menzies suggests that the museum reopen the Tomb of Senef, one of the museum's original exhibits that's been mothballed for decades. Coincidentally, at the same time, a 10-million euro bequest comes in from the Count of Cahors, who would seem to be a descendant of one of the naturalists who traveled with Napoleon's army during his invasion of Egypt. Menzies then approaches Nora Kelly to make her the point person for the reopening of the exhibit.

Menzies introduces an Egyptologist that will help with the reopening of the exhibit—Adrian Wicherly. They approach Seamus McCorkle, who knows a lot about the locations of old exhibits, to help them find the walled up exhibit. Nora, Menzies, Wicherly, and McCorkle tour through the old exhibit, consisting of several rooms, a wooden bridge over a 15-foot drop, and several ancient curses. The tomb was originally acquired by Napoleon, disassembled, and then after a few stops, was finally reassembled in the NY Museum of Natural History, only to then be forgotten for over 70 years.

Proctor and D'Agosta are casing Herkmoor prison, at the behest of Eli Glinn. Meanwhile, Diogenes has penetrated the defenses of 891 Riverside and has a conversation with Constance. He tries to convince her that he is very much like her, and that Pendergast has lied and that he deprived Diogenes of a childhood, killed his childhood pet, and is the reason for his milky blue eye.

Menzies locates Margo Green where she is recovering and drugs her. Back in the museum, the two workers that are finishing up the computer and electronics work on the exhibit are attacked by something that seems to be a mummy. Hayward and the cops find who they think is the killer: Jay Lipper, the head tech.

As part of the plan to help Pendergast escape, Vinnie enters the prison, in the guise of a meat delivery driver. Coffey enlists the warden to get Pendergast to have yard privileges at the same time as Pocho Lacarra, a killer who was put in jail with the help of Pendergast. There is a tussle in the yard, and Pendergast is injured while Lacarra is killed.

Diogenes continues to meet with Constance at the mansion, and she is beginning to believe the tales he's telling her, which undermine Pendergast while making it look like Diogenes is just misunderstood.

Smithback drives to the house where Diogenes held Viola. There is police tape all around, and he's able to open the front door where the police had to kick it in. While hiding in a closet, he realizes there are 2 types of coats, expensive cashmere and itchy tweed. He realizes who Diogenes' alter ego is. We also learn that Margo has taken a turn for the worse: she's comatose, but not dead.

Jay Lipper, the computer tech, has gone crazy due to an electric shock to his cerebral cortex. It seems like the same thing has happened to Wicherly, the Egyptologist. He attacks Nora in her office in the museum, and her screaming for help brings in security. One of the security men shoots Wicherly, seemingly killing him.

Smithback tells Hayward his theory, and she agrees. They think that one of the curators in the museum is Diogenes' alter ego—but they don't know the specific person.

The museum director, Dr. Collopy, and some other high ranking museum officials think the Tomb of Senef opening should be delayed, but Menzies convinces them that the opening should go on as planned. He's also found the replacement for the late Dr. Wicherly: Viola Maskelene.

Glinn, D'Agosta, and Pendergast meet back at Glinn's warehouse after the successful escape. Glinn reveals he hacked the Justice Department database to make it appear that Pendergast had arrested Lacarra, and therefore Coffey would use Lacarra to attack Pendergast. Glint convinces Pendergast to use his Chongg Ran meditation technique to figure out the key event from his past: the event that made Diogenes evil. At the end of a very difficult memory crossing, Pendergast does indeed remember the Event.

The Event was a magic show, a phantasmagoria named "The Doorway to Hell," devised by Pendergast's great-grand uncle Comstock Pendergast. Comstock was a famed magician who mentored Harry Houdini, but grew bitter and misanthropic as he aged. At the end of the show, the person was given a choice: be driven insane, or you could take your own life. Diogenes chose the latter, and a bullet from the device struck him, but didn't kill him. That, not scarlet fever as his parents had used as a cover story, was what actually damaged Diogenes' eye and altered his behavior. Because Pendergast repressed the memory and therefore never apologized, Diogenes has been thinking for all this time that Pendergast was too cold to ask for forgiveness.

Hayward finds D'Agosta and Pendergast at Glinn's warehouse, and they rush to the museum to stop the show, but by the time they arrive the first group has already entered the tomb. When they attempt to stop the show from the computers, they discover that they are locked out.

Diogenes seduces Constance, and the next morning, she finds a letter and a present from him. The letter mentions how Leng, her benefactor, killed her sister and other young people to further his research into life extension, thus also allowing Constance her long life. The "present" is a scalpel for her to use to kill herself.

At the exhibit, the people inside are subjected to the light and sound show that Diogenes created to drive them mad. But Pendergast, with Smithback's help, makes enough nitroglycerin to breach the walls of the exhibit at their thinnest point, which is the old entrance from the subway station.

Diogenes, discarding his Menzies disguise, escapes to the Lake Champlain overnight train to Montreal. He intends to stop off and finish off Margo Green with a lethal injection. But Constance, disguised as an old woman, enters his state room and fires a gun at him several times. She misses, but Diogenes must jump out of the train to escape her retribution.

Constance boards a plane from Logan to Florence—the same plane that Diogenes is on, and Pendergast books himself on the next flight. Constance and Diogenes are tracking each other around Florence. They have an interaction wherein they wound each other with knives. Diogenes leaves Venice and heads home to the Sicilian island/volcano of Stromboli.

Constance and Pendergast both then track Diogenes to his home on the island. Constance fires several bullets at Diogenes through the doors and windows of his home, and he returns fire. Diogenes leaves his house and runs up the slope of the volcano, attempting to ambush Constance. Meanwhile, Pendergast arrives at the island, enlists the help of the local carabinieri. Upon arriving at Diogenes' house and finding the aftermath of his and Constance's battle, then Pendergast heads up the slope as well.

Pendergast sees Constance and Diogenes fighting each other, locked in an embrace, at the edge of a cliff high upon the volcano. Then, he sees both figures disappear. Running over, he sees a hand clutching the rock, 2 feet below the abyss. He pulls the person up, and to his relief it is Constance.

Back in New York, Lieutenant D'Agosta is having his disciplinary hearing. Captain Hayward tells him that Pendergast has been cleared of all charges, and is now on a six-month leave. Agent Coffey has been demoted and re-assigned to North Dakota. Vinnie tells Laura that he loves her, and they seem to be back together.

Nora and Bill visit Margo Green at the Feversham Clinic in upstate NY, where she is recovering from her drugging by Diogenes. They update her on the events at the museum and tell her that the Tomb of Senef exhibit is being reopened, and is turning out to be very popular.

On the island of Capraia, Viola and Pendergast are relaxing along with Constance, who's strolling around the grounds of Viola's estate. Pendergast mentions his plan to spend some time at the monastery in Tibet where he'd learned Chongg Ran, and Viola offers to take Constance with her when she resumes her archeology work in the Valley of the Kings in Egypt. When Pendergast mentions this to Constance, she tells Pendergast that she's pregnant.

== Connections to other works by Preston and Child ==
- Near the beginning of the book, Nora Kelly studies yellow micaceous Anasazi potsherds and begins to plan an expedition to find their source. This references Thunderhead.
- Readers will find echoes of Relic and Dance of Death in the premise of another big museum exhibit gone wrong.

== Sequel ==
Though this novel ends the trilogy, Agent Pendergast and his ward, Constance Greene, appear next in the novel The Wheel of Darkness which picks up very shortly following the events depicted here.
