= Remy Auberjonois =

American actor

- Born: Rémy-Luc Julian Michel Auberjonois
- Occupation: Actor
- Years active: 1981–present
- Spouse: Kate Nowlin
- Father: René Murat Auberjonois
- Relatives: Fernand Auberjonois (grandfather); René V. Auberjonois (great-grandfather); Joachim Murat (great-great-great-great-grandfather); Caroline Bonaparte (great-great-great-great-grandmother)

Rémy-Luc Julian Michel Auberjonois is an American actor. He is best known for his recurring role as Mr. Albin in the television series Weeds and as Dr. Emerson on the television series Mad Men.

== Personal life ==
Auberjonois is the son of René Auberjonois and Judith Mihalyi. He is married to actress Kate Nowlin. They live in Minneapolis, Minnesota. He frequently appears at the Guthrie Theater.

== Filmography ==
=== Film ===
Year	Title	Role	Notes
1997	Snide and Prejudice	Chuck	
1999	Loser Love	Bartender	
2004	2BPerfectlyHonest	Jim - Bathhouse Clerk	
2005	The Reality Trap	Lee	
2007	Michael Clayton	Fifth Year	
2009	The International	Sam Purvitz	
2009	Asylum Seekers	Dinner Host	
2010	Fair Game	Nervous Analyst #2	
2012	Price Check	Todd Kenner	
2013	The English Teacher	Arrogant Man	
2013	The Maid's Room	Father Niles	
2016	Half the Perfect World	Rob	

=== Television ===
Year	Title	Role	Notes
1981	Benson	Dan's Son	Episode: "Marcy's Wedding"
1986	Wildfire	Additional voices	1 Season
1988	Cadets	Squad Leader Brigham	TV movie
1988	Scooby-Doo and the Ghoul School	Baxter	TV movie
1988	L.A. Law	Matthew Richardson	Episode: "The Son Also Rises"
1994	ER	Elliot	Episode: "Into That Good Night"
1998	Sex and the City	Waiter	Episode: "Bay of Married Pigs"
2004	The Sopranos	Dr. Phillip Seepman	Episode: "Cold Cuts"
2004	Law & Order: Special Victims Unit	Eric Liebert	Episode: "Scavenger"
2005–2006	Weeds	Mr. Albin	3 episodes
2006, 2007	Law & Order: Criminal Intent	Dr. Jay Alberstein / Zelman	2 episodes
2006, 2009	Law & Order	Bill Murphy / Dr. Evan Fleming	2 episodes
2007–2010	Mad Men	Dr. Emerson	2 episodes
2008	30 Rock	Tyler Brody	Episode: "Believe in the Stars"
2009	Possible Side Effects	Peter Thomas	TV movie
2010	Boardwalk Empire	Theodore Hardeen	Episode: "Paris Green"
2010–2015	The Good Wife	Martin Parillo	4 episodes
2011	Mildred Pierce	Starched Collar Man	2 episodes
2011	Person of Interest	Jimmy Calhoun	Episode: "Ghosts"
2011	Pan Am	Walter Elkins	Episode: "We'll Always Have Paris"
2011	Homeland	William Pritchard	Episode: "Representative Brody"
2012	Hemingway & Gellhorn	John Ferno	TV movie
2012	Made in Jersey	Ron Denault	Episode: "Ancient History"
2012–2013	666 Park Avenue	Father Douglas	2 episodes
2013	Veep	Vince Hessler	Episode: "Hostages"
2013	Inside Amy Schumer	Psychiatrist	Episode: "Unpleasant Truths"
2013	Zero Hour	Dr. Pitt	Episode: "Suspension"
2013	Blue Bloods	Preston Ellis	Episode: "Bad Blood"
2013	Next Caller	Grady	2 episodes
2014	Believe	George	Episode: "Pilot"
2014	The Normal Heart	Examining Doctor	TV movie
2014	The Leftovers	ER Doctor	Episode: "Gladys"
2014	The Money	Louis Russel	TV movie
2015	The Americans	Arthur	2 episodes
2015	The Mysteries of Laura	Dr. Evanston	Episode: "The Mystery of the Corner Store Crossfire"
2015	Show Me a Hero	Michael Sculnick	3 episodes
2016	Blindspot	Timothy Eavers	Episode: "Rules in Defiance’
2026	Maximum Pleasure Guaranteed	Doug Warwick	Recurring

=== Stage Credits ===
Year	Title	Role	Notes
2022	The Music Man	Charlie Cowell	
