= Dance of Death (novel) =

Novel by Lincoln Child

- Author: Douglas Preston and Lincoln Child
- Cover artist: Bernt Notke
- Language: English
- Series: Diogenes Trilogy, Aloysius Pendergast
- Genre: Thriller
- Publisher: Warner Books
- Publication date: June 2, 2005
- Publication place: United States
- Media type: Print, e-book, audiobook
- Pages: 451 pp. (Hardcover)
- ISBN: 0-446-57697-2
- OCLC: 57669819
- Dewey Decimal: 813/.54 22
- LC Class: PS3566.R3982 D36 2005b
- Preceded by: Brimstone
- Followed by: The Book of the Dead

Dance of Death is a novel by American authors Douglas Preston and Lincoln Child, published on June 2, 2005, by Warner Books. This is the sixth book in the Special Agent Pendergast series. Also, this novel is the second book in the Diogenes trilogy: the first book is Brimstone, released in 2004, and the last book is The Book of the Dead, released in 2006.

== Synopsis ==
The book follows FBI Special Agent Aloysius Pendergast and his sidekick, Lieutenant Vincent D'Agosta. Pendergast was last seen at the end of the previous novel, Brimstone, where he was buried alive behind a brick wall in Castel Fosco. His estranged brother, Diogenes, rescues him and nurses him back to health. However this is not a true act of kindness; Diogenes has a dark agenda and needs his brother alive in order to carry out his nefarious plans.

Pendergast's ward Constance Greene requests Vincent D'Agosta's presence for a very important meeting. D'Agosta is shown a letter written many months previously by Pendergast about his brother Diogenes. In the letter, Pendergast writes that he does not know of Diogenes's whereabouts, but does in fact know one thing—a date, January 28. D'Agosta presumes that this will be the date of Diogenes's greatest crime. Having been hated by and hating his family, Diogenes obviously cannot be trusted.

== Plot ==
English professor Dr. Hamilton is giving a lecture when he goes crazy, tearing at his face, and stabbing a piece of broken glass into his neck, killing himself. Vincent D’Agosta has been living with Captain Laura Hayward for 6 weeks. He has been restored to his rank of lieutenant in the NYPD. He is summoned by Proctor, Pendergast's chauffeur, to the 891 Riverside mansion.

Constance presents him with a letter that Pendergast wrote just before their fateful trip to Italy. The letter, which is meant to be opened in the event of his death, mentions that Diogenes, Pendergast's brother, is planning a crime and that since he is dead, it falls to D’Agosta to stop him.

Dr. Margo Green is back at the New York Museum of Natural History. She is the new editor of Museology, a prestigious magazine, and the director of the museum, Dr. Collopy, wants to meet with her to discuss an issue.

D’Agosta asks for leave from the NYPD: he gets it, but his captain is not happy with him. He begins trying to track down Diogenes, but does not make much progress. Meanwhile, Smithback is back at the Times, but he is not happy that Bryce Harriman is also there now.

Another strange death occurs, where a man is hanged out of his 24th story apartment, and falls through the glass ceiling of a restaurant.

Pendergast returns alive disguised as Hayward's doorman, and “captures” D’Agosta in the elevator. Pendergast describes how Diogenes rescued him from being walled up in Fosco's sub-basement only to torment him. Diogenes' plan is to kill all the people that Pendergast cares about. The two people killed thus far were Pendergast's favored teacher and his closest childhood friend, a painter, Maurice Duchamp.

Margo Green tracks down Nora Kelly to discuss returning the Kiva masks. But Nora disagrees with Margo, and won't back her decision.

Pendergast travels to D.C. to save his friend, agent Mike Decker, but Diogenes kills him and attempts to frame Pendergast for the murder. He gets another message from Diogenes which indicates that Smithback will be the next victim. Pendergast masquerades as a cab driver and picks up Smithback.

After a high speed chase, Pendergast drops Smithback off at a high-class, expensive sanatorium in the Catskills.

D’Agosta is trying to gather information for Pendergast on the Duchamp murder, but has to sneak around and move out of Hayward's apartment in order to do so.

At the museum, Nora Kelly is preparing the new exhibition, Sacred Images. It is the biggest exhibition at the museum since the Superstition exhibition 6 years earlier, which was made infamous by the Mbwun beast terrorizing the museum guests.

Smithback is thwarted in his attempt to escape the sanitarium, and Diogenes' actual target turns out to be Margo Green, whom he stabs at the museum. He says his next target is D’Agosta, but he has lured Viola to NYC. After using a drugged handkerchief on Viola, he locks her in a room in a house. Then, Diogenes tells Viola that she will die on the morning of the 28th.

Pendergast enlists the help of Eli Glinn, an expert psychological profiler, to help figure out his brother's next moves.

Pendergast has been framed, but he and D’Agosta are trying to track down Diogenes’ movements after he met Viola at the airport.

Diogenes, in his created personality of Hugo Menzies, a museum curator, is stealing the magnificent red diamond Lucifer's Heart. As he drives away with the diamond, we learn that Diogenes does not see color: the world is only shades of gray to him.

The stolen Lucifer's Heart is revealed to be a fake, a colorless diamond made red by irradiation. Pendergast plans to steal the real one himself, and trade it for the life of Viola.

The FBI agent in charge of bringing in Pendergast is Special Agent Coffey, who was embarrassed by Pendergast during the events described in Relic and thus has a personal vendetta against Pendergast.

Diogenes arranges to meet Pendergast at the Iron Clock railway turntable under Penn Station to make the trade. D’Agosta leaves with Viola and Kaplan the diamond expert, while Pendergast takes back the diamond and confronts Diogenes.

Pendergast gets arrested and the Feds want to execute him. Captain Hayward and Viola visit Pendergast in his cell. Laura believes a lot of his story, as there are eyewitnesses and evidence to support Pendergast. Also, he was able to save Margo Green, who turned up badly injured at a sanitarium.

Eli Glinn goes to the mansion at 891 Riverside to enlist D’Agosta to help him break Pendergast out of Herkmoor Correctional Facility—even though he is currently in Bellevue. But Glinn knows he'll be taken there shortly. And he knows that Diogenes is the most dangerous man in the world.

== Reviews ==
Reviews of the book were generally positive. Publishers Weekly noted that "While it's not as good as some of their earlier efforts, it's still pretty darn good." Similarly, Barbara Lipkien of Bookreporter wrote that "Dance of Death may be a bit more melodramatic than the others in this series, but overall the book holds up." Writing for the Library Journal, Jim Ayers called the novel "A rare second book in a trilogy that actually improves on the first." Reviewers also commented favorably on the cliffhanger ending.
