= Fernand Auberjonois =

Swiss-American journalist (1910–2004)

- Born: 25 September 1910; Valeyres-sous-Montagny, Switzerland
- Died: 27 August 2004 (aged 93); Enniskeane, County Cork, Ireland
- Occupation: Journalist
- Spouses: Princess Laure Louise Napoléone Eugénie Caroline Murat (m. 1939, divorced) Helga (m. 1968)
- Children: 3; including René
- Parents: René Auberjonois (father); Augusta Grenier (mother)
- Relatives: Rémy Auberjonois (grandson)
- Honours: Legion of Honour; Croix de Guerre; Legion of Merit; Polonia Restituta

Fernand Auberjonois (25 September 1910 – 27 August 2004) was a Swiss-American journalist who worked as the foreign correspondent of the Pittsburgh Post-Gazette and the Toledo Blade. Throughout most of the Cold War, he was one of the most admired American reporters based in London. From 1956 until his formal retirement in 1983 and after, he covered many of the world's biggest news stories. During World War II, Auberjonois enlisted in the U.S. and served on secret assignments, including setting up radio transmissions for the Allies to divert the German's attention from the real invasion site on D-Day. From World War II through the Cold War, he worked for many print organizations, and also for NBC and Voice of America.

== Biography ==
Auberjonois was born in Valeyres-sous-Montagny near Yverdon-les-Bains, Switzerland, the son of Augusta Grenier and René Auberjonois (1872–1957), one of Switzerland's best-known post-Impressionist painters. He married into European (Napoleonic) royalty; his first wife being Princess Laure Louise Napoléone Eugénie Caroline Murat (13 November 1913 – 10 May 1986), a descendant of Napoleon's sister Caroline and her husband Joachim Murat, who was King of Naples and King of Sicily. They married in November 1939 and had a son, actor René Auberjonois, born on 1 June 1940.

In his 80s, he lived in Enniskeane, County Cork, Ireland, where he owned a cottage. He died on 27 August 2004, at the age of 93, of a heart attack in County Cork.

== Honours and awards ==
- Chevalier of the Légion d'honneur (France)
- Croix de guerre 1939–1945 with four palmes (France)
- Legion of Merit (United States)
- Polonia Restituta (Poland)
