= Cemetery Dance (novel) =

2009 novel by Lincoln Child

- Hardcover edition
- Author: Douglas Preston; Lincoln Child
- Language: English
- Series: Pendergast
- Genre: Thriller
- Publisher: Grand Central Publishing
- Publication date: May 12, 2009
- Publication place: United States
- Media type: Print, e-book, audiobook
- Pages: 435 pp.
- ISBN: 0-446-58029-5
- OCLC: 181603302
- Dewey Decimal: 813/.54 22
- LC Class: PS3566.R3982 C46 2009
- Preceded by: The Wheel of Darkness
- Followed by: Fever Dream

Cemetery Dance is a thriller novel by Douglas Preston and Lincoln Child released on May 12, 2009 by Grand Central Publishing. This is the ninth installment in the Special Agent Pendergast series. During production, it was known by the pre-release title Revenant. The preceding novel is The Wheel of Darkness.

== Plot summary ==
After celebrating their first anniversary, William Smithback, a reporter for The New York Times, and his wife Nora Kelly, a Museum of Natural History archeologist, return home from a romantic dinner. Kelly slips out to pick up a pastry from the local shop, but upon her return to their apartment on the Upper West side of Manhattan, she finds the door ajar, Smithback dead, and is attacked as she approaches.

Eyewitnesses claim, and the security camera confirms, the attacker seen leaving the building was an individual who lived in the apartment building along with Smithback and Kelly. The twist: the man that witnesses believe is Smithback's murderer was pulled from the river dead, after committing suicide, two weeks before the attack. D'Agosta, a homicide detective, leads the official investigation, while FBI Special Agent Aloysius Pendergast's and Kelly's involvement leads to a less traditional quest for the truth. Their serpentine journey takes them into a part of Manhattan they never imagined could exist: a secretive and deadly hotbed of Obeah, the West Indian Zombi cult of sorcery and magic. Unfortunately many others learn of the cult, thus endangering themselves and countless innocent lives.

== Detailed Plot ==
Bill Smithback and Nora Kelly are celebrating their first wedding Anniversary, when Bill is attacked and stabbed to death in their NYC apartment. The killer appears to be a resident of The same building, Colin Fearing. The problem is that Colin killed himself 10 days previously, and his body was fished out of the Harlem River, and autopsied.

Fearing attacks Nora a couple times, while Pendergast and D’Agosta are investigating Lucas Kline, CEO of Digital Veracity, which Smithback was investigating before his murder. They also exhume Fearing’s body—but there’s nothing in his crypt.

Another journalist, Caitlyn Kidd, is investigating the murder, and she asks Nora to help. Nora tracks down an animal sacrifice story that Bill was working on. When viewing Bill’s body, Pendergast notices some sort of fishhook in his tongue.

Nora heads to The Ville in upper Harlem, the place Bill thought was the main source of animal sacrifice in NYC.

Pendergast and D’Agosta visit Pendergast’s great aunt Cornelia. Pendergast asks about Marie LeBon, a maid whowas found dead one day. Cornelia mentions that she never liked her: the only servant that she liked less was Monsieur Bertin. The corpse had a bit of Gris-gris (called oanga) pinned to her tongue, similar to Smithback. This is done in Obeah (similar to Voodoo).

Vinnie is called into Commissioner Rocker’s office, where he is reprimanded for searching Lucas Kline’s offices. He and Pendergast visit a Voodoo shop in Spanish Harlem where Pendergast purchases $1,200 worth of items to remove a curse.

Pendergast and Vinnie visit the man who is responsible for the animal cruelty complaints, Mr. Esteban. He has a large farm and is rich. After this, Nora attends the Gotham Press Club awards, where she sees her husband, zombie-like, attack Caitlyn Kidd with a knife, killing her.

Nora then breaks into the morgue, where she discovers that Bill’s body is missing. D’Agosta goes to the Ville, interviews an old woman who heard animal noises, then goes into the property and is attacked by someone: possibly Fearing.

Pendergast summons Monsieur Bertin, while he and Vinnie go to City Hall to start proceedings to evict the squatters in the Ville.

Bill attacks Nora in their apartment, but neighbors hear the disturbance and save Nora. Pendergast, D’Agosta, and Bertin view the evidence they gathered from the Ville. Bertin is concerned that the high priest at the Ville gathered hair from them and now can cast spells against them.

Pendergast and Vinnie go dig up the body of the caretaker at the Strauss mansion. They believe he is the first zombie killer created at the Ville.

Lucas Kline donates money to the NYPD to get Hayward removed from a task force she was supposed to be appointed to. Nora is drugged in her hospital room by someone dressed as an orderly. The city says it will take up to 3 years to get the squatters removed from the Ville.

Nora gets kidnapped from her hospital room, and wakes in a basement where someone says she will die soon. Kids smoking weed near the Ville stumble across a body that seems to be Colin Fearing, but the corpse is fresh, killed by a bullet to the head. Marty Wartek, the Housing Authority bureaucrat, is murdered after making an announcement that the city has begun eviction proceedings against the Ville. This stirs up the populace, and Richard Plock begins to organize a large protest march, wherein he hopes to forcibly remove the people living in the Ville and free their animals.

Deputy Chief Chislett prepares for a small, disorganized protest. However, Plock has planned for a bunch of small, separate gathering places for people, and when they come together, they form a huge group that completely overwhelms the police presence. At the Ville, the marchers and the residents fight: the animals are freed and run wild. Pendergast and D’Agosta are chased through the basement of the Ville by the envoi/zombii and Vinny’s arm gets broken.

Pendergast stumbles over the coffin of one of Esteban’s ancestor’s, Elijah Esteban, and notices that a scroll seems to have been stolen from the body, only minutes prior. He realizes that Esteban, not the Ville, has kidnapped Nora, and heads to Esteban’s estate, using a commandeered police speed boat.

The zombii kills Plock in the altar of the Ville church. It then goes back to the basement and finds D’Agosta. Bossong, the Ville community leader, kills the zombii, after he tells it to stop attacking Vinnie and Laura.

Pendergast finds Nora in Esteban’s barn basement. Esteban shoots Pendergast, then later shoots Nora: however, they were both wearing Pendergast’s bulletproof vest when they were shot. When Esteban then enters the cell, Nora attacks him from behind, gouging out one of his eyes. As they are chasing him through his extensive basements, he accidentally chops off his own head with a guillotine that he has kept, along with many other props from movies that he has directed.

In the hospital, as Pendergast recovers from a bullet wound that missed his vest, he explains the series of events. He starts by telling Laura and Vinny what was in the document that they found in Esteban’s safe. It was a will and a deed, which showed that Esteban had owned 20 acres of farmland in the 1600’s, that was now prime Manhattan real estate. Alexander Esteban, as his only living heir, would be entitled to land worth billions.

Esteban had hired a researcher who searched old records—he was the person that Wren noticed had been searching through the same documents that Wren had searched. Esteban then murdered the researcher, and dumped his body in the Harlem River. This body is the one identified as Colin Fearing.

Esteban, learning about the will, and realizing that it was in the Ville, hatched his plan. He hired two accomplices. Colin Fearing and Caitlyn Kidd. He whipped up public sentiment against the Ville, after he joined Humans for Other Animals.

Esteban wrote a script in which Fearing faked his own death, using the researcher’s corpse as a body. Caitlyn Kidd pretended to be his sister when identifying the corpse. Once everybody thought Fearing was dead, Esteban heightened the illusion with makeup. And he had Fearing, pretending to be himself risen from the dead, kill Smithback and attack Nora.

Caitlyn then approached Nora to help her pin the murder on the Ville. Next, Esteban stole Smithback’s body from the morgue. He needed Smithback’s body to make a mask of his face for Fearing’s use. Fearing wore the mask to murder Kidd before a group of other reporters, who would easily identify Smithback.

He then kidnapped Nora. The zombii was in reality one of the members of the Ville, probably a volunteer. They then lobotomized him, making him impervious to pain, free of moral restraints, extremely violent, yet submissive to its masters.

The members of the Ville are allowed to stay, with no more animal sacrifices and no more creation of zombiis. Pendergast believes that Bossong, having saved Laura and Vinnie from the creature, will become a good leader.

Lucas Kline, it turns out, was being recorded by the FBI when he bribed Commissioner Rocker to remove Captain Hayward from the task force. Rocker is relieved of command and Kline is going to jail.

Hayward and D’Agosta seem to be getting back together. Mr. Ogilby, the solicitor for the Pendergast family, delivers a mysterious letter to Pendergast in his hospital bed.

Epilogue. Nora returns to New Mexico to scatter her husband’s ashes in a river where they had met and begun to fall in love with each other. She accepts a job as a curator at the Santa Fe Archaeological Institute.
