= Two Graves (novel) =

Novel by Douglas Preston and Lincoln Child

- Hardcover edition
- Author: Douglas Preston; Lincoln Child
- Language: English
- Series: Pendergast
- Genre: Thriller
- Publisher: Grand Central Publishing
- Publication date: December 11, 2012
- Publication place: United States
- Media type: Print, e-book, audiobook
- Pages: 480 pp.
- ISBN: 0-446-55499-5
- Preceded by: Cold Vengeance
- Followed by: White Fire

Two Graves is a thriller novel by Douglas Preston and Lincoln Child. It was released on December 11, 2012 by Grand Central Publishing. This is the twelfth book in the Special Agent Pendergast series and also the third novel in the Helen trilogy. The preceding novel is Cold Vengeance.

== Plot summary ==
Pendergast's bloodlust continues as he chases those responsible for the abduction of Helen, who was revealed to have been alive and well for the past twelve years at the climax of Cold Vengeance. But a new threat intrudes upon Pendergast's chase: a serial killer who holds New York City in the grip of terror.

== Plot ==
The novel opens where Cold Vengeance left off: with Pendergast's meeting with his wife, but now from her point of view. Pendergast visits various functionaries of the Covenant, threatening them to find out about the kidnapping. He finds they are taking Helen out of the country in a private plane in Fort Lauderdale.

Pendergast damages the plane, killing one kidnapper. He tracks their destination and follows them to Mexico. Pendergast catches up to Helen and her captors in the Mexican desert on a stolen Ducati Streetfighter motorcycle. He takes out one vehicle, then disables the vehicle carrying Helen.

In a standoff, a kidnapper shoots Helen fatally. Pendergast kills the shooter, but Wulf Konrad Fischer, who piloted the plane, escapes. Pendergast buries his wife, then passes out above the grave.

Alban Lorimer kills a woman in a New York City hotel by cutting her throat. He ensures he is seen, leaving a piece of his ear at the crime scene. Lieutenant D’Agosta leads the investigation, Corrie Swanson and one with Dr. Felder. Corrie escaped the house at the end of Cold Vengeance. Dr. Felder visits Constance in the Mount Mercy Asylum, where she agrees to let him visit occasionally as a friend.

Pendergast, ready to die, takes pills. Vinny hesitates to intervene. Meanwhile, Lorimer kills another hotel guest. Lady Viola Maskelene visits Pendergast, alerted to Helen's murder by Captain Hayward. Pendergast tells Viola he plans to end his life using an ancestral drug that grants a few minutes of euphoria. Corrie shows Pendergast Nazi papers she found, but he is uninterested, advising her to stay with her father in Allentown, Pennsylvania. Finally, D'Agosta rouses Pendergast from his stupor by showing him the hotel murders. Pendergast identifies the killer as his supposedly late brother, Diogenes.

Alban kills a third guest, leaving his little toe. FBI Agent Gibbs suspects an accomplice has access to hotel video feeds; D'Agosta agrees. Dr. Felder seeks a lock of hair Constance gave to photographer Alexander Wintour. He rents a gatehouse from Wintour’s grand-niece in Connecticut to access Wintour's papers. Corrie finds her father in a cabin. He was framed for a robbery, but had sent her cards for years, which her mother returned to make Corrie believe he abandoned her.

Pendergast analyzes the killer's mitochondrial DNA and realizes the murderer is his and Helen’s son, not Diogenes. A young man, claiming to be Pendergast's son, arrives at his apartment with his missing ear, finger, and toe. The boy tells Pendergast his story. Raised in Nova Godoi, Brazil, the stronger twins receive privilege, while the weaker twins are relegated to manual labor. He escaped and found Pendergast, who names him Tristam and has Proctor hide him at 891 Riverside. Tristam's brother, Alban, is the hotel killer.

Corrie works at her father's former dealership to find the real thieves. Charlie Foote, a salesman, catches her taking personnel files and offers to help clear her father. Dr. Felder plans to break into the Wintour library. Pendergast traces Tristam's escape route to an abandoned brewery, finding the word "BETATEST." He deduces the next murder site and arrives with Vinny just as Alban completes the deed. Pendergast pursues Alban, but Alban disarms him, initiating a confrontation. Vinny tells Captain Singleton that the murderer is Pendergast’s son. Consequently, Pendergast is placed on leave, Vinny is removed from the case, and their friendship is strained. Meanwhile, Alban infiltrates 891 Riverside, defeats Proctor, and kidnaps Tristam.

Corrie goes with Foote to see her father. Foote, who is in on the scam, wounds her father and ties Corrie up. Corrie attacks him, and her father stabs Foote with a penknife. They expose the dealership's fraud. Pendergast visits Constance, who advises confronting Der Bund in Nova Godoi, noting Alban's enhanced senses from the eugenics program. Pendergast goes to Brazil, partnering with Colonel Souza. They plan an assault on Nova Godoi. Pendergast enters the town pretending to be a butterfly collector and finds where the imperfect twins are kept.

Dr. Felder breaks into the Wintour library, finds the hair, and escapes after injuring Ms. Wintour's attacking manservant, Dukchuk. Pendergast is captured but escapes, signaling Souza's force. In the battle, Souza, his son, and his men are killed. Pendergast destroys the stronghold, but Fischer and Alban escape.

Alban shoots Fischer for failing to eliminate the weaker twins, then departs. Pendergast cannot bring himself to shoot his son. Constance tells Dr. Felder her story: she faked killing her child to smuggle him safely to India to be trained as a Rinpoche.

In New York, Pendergast helps D'Agosta expose Captain Singleton's secretary, Midge Rawley, as the traitor who leaked Helen's location. Vinny proposes to Laura, who accepts. Pendergast writes a letter to Viola, stating they can only be friends. At 891 Riverside, Constance and Tristam play cards as Pendergast asks Constance to mentor the boy.
