= Murder of Meredith Kercher =

2007 murder in Perugia, Italy

- Kercher in 2007
- Location: Perugia, Umbria, Italy
- Date: 1 November 2007; 19 years ago
- Attack type: Sexual assault, murder
- Weapon: Knife
- Victim: Meredith Kercher
- Perpetrator: Rudy Guede (13 years in prison)

Meredith Susanna Cara Kercher (28 December 1985 – 1 November 2007) was a British student on exchange from the University of Leeds who was murdered at the age of 21 in Perugia, Italy. Kercher was found dead on the floor of her room. By the time the bloodstained fingerprints at the scene were identified as belonging to Rudy Guede, an Ivorian migrant, police had charged Kercher's American roommate, Amanda Knox, and Knox's Italian boyfriend, Raffaele Sollecito, with Kercher's murder. The subsequent prosecutions of Knox and Sollecito received international publicity, with forensic experts and jurists taking a critical view of the evidence supporting the initial guilty verdicts.

In 2011, after nearly four years in prison, Knox and Sollecito were released following their acquittal at a second-level trial. Knox immediately returned to the United States. In 2013 the appeals verdicts for the acquittal (of Knox and Sollecito) were declared null for "manifest illogicalities" by the Supreme Court of Cassation of Italy, and the case was sent back to an appeals court in Florence. In 2014, the original guilty verdicts against Knox and Sollecito were reinstated but, on 27 March 2015, the Supreme Court again quashed the convictions, citing "stunning flaws" and "culpable omissions" in the murder investigation. The court also ordered that no further trial should be held, definitively resolving the cases against Knox and Sollecito.

Guede was tried separately in a fast-track procedure and, in October 2008, was found guilty of the sexual assault and murder of Kercher. He subsequently exhausted the appeals process and began serving a 16-year sentence. On 4 December 2020, an Italian court ruled that Guede could complete his term doing community service. Guede was released from prison on 24 November 2021. He was in court facing trial in 2025 for sexual assault and domestic violence.

== Meredith Kercher ==
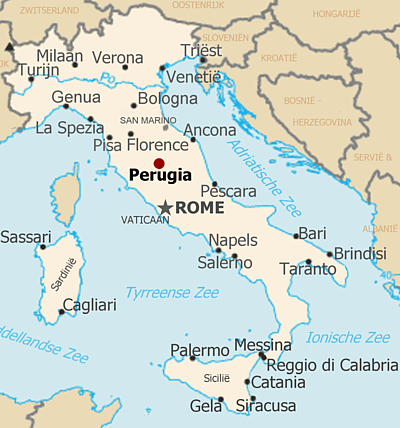
Kercher arrived in Perugia in August 2007.

External image
- Via della Pergola 7, courtesy of the BBC.

=== Background ===
Meredith Susanna Cara Kercher (born 28 December 1985 in Southwark, South London), known to her friends as "Mez", lived in Coulsdon, South London. She was educated at the Old Palace School in Croydon. She was enthusiastic about the language and culture of Italy, and after a school exchange trip, she returned at age 15 to spend her summer vacation with a family in Sessa Aurunca.

Kercher studied European politics and Italian at the University of Leeds. She worked as a barmaid and a tour guide, and also made a cameo appearance in the music video for Kristian Leontiou's song "Some Say" in 2004. She aspired to work for the European Union or as a journalist. In October 2007, she attended the University of Perugia, where she began courses in modern history, political theory, and the history of cinema. Fellow students later described her as caring, intelligent, witty, and popular.

=== Via della Pergola 7 ===
At the time, Perugia had a population of 150,000 people, of whom more than a quarter were students, many from abroad. In the city, Kercher shared a four-bedroom, first-floor flat in a house at Via della Pergola 7. Her flatmates were two Italian women in their late 20s, Filomena Romanelli and Laura Mezzetti, as well as a 20-year-old American student from the University of Washington, Amanda Knox, who was attending the University for Foreigners in Perugia on an exchange year. Kercher moved in on 10 September 2007, and Knox moved in on 20 September. Kercher typically called her mother daily on a mobile phone. A second mobile phone she used was registered to her flatmate, Romanelli.

The lower level of the house was occupied by four young Italian men with whom both Kercher and Knox were friendly. Late one night in mid-October, Kercher and Knox were out and away from their residence. They returned home at 2:00 a.m. and met Rudy Guede, who had been invited into the lower-level flat by some of the Italian tenants. Kercher and Knox left at 4:30 a.m.

Kercher and Knox attended the EuroChocolate festival in mid-October. On 25 October they attended a classical music concert, where Knox met Raffaele Sollecito, a 23-year-old computer science student at the University of Perugia.

=== Last sighting ===
1 November (All Saints' Day) was a public holiday in Italy, so Kercher's Italian flatmates and the downstairs occupants were out of town. Kercher had dinner with three English women at one of their homes on that evening. She parted company with a friend around 8:45 pm, about 500 yards (460 m) from Via della Pergola 7.

Knox's account is that she spent the night with Sollecito and returned to Via della Pergola 7 on the morning of 2 November 2007, where she found the front door open. Drops of blood were in the bathroom that she shared with Kercher. Kercher's bedroom door was locked, and Knox guessed that Kercher was sleeping. Knox took a shower in the bathroom that she and Kercher shared. She found faeces in the toilet of the bathroom of Romanelli and Mezzetti. She went back to Sollecito's home, and later returned with him to Via della Pergola 7. Sollecito noticed a broken window in Romanelli's bedroom. He was alarmed that Kercher did not answer her door, and tried unsuccessfully to force it open. He then called his sister, who was a lieutenant in the carabinieri, for advice. She advised him to call the 112 emergency number, which he did.

=== Discovery of the body ===
Romanelli arrived at the flat after receiving a telephone call from Knox. Romanelli inadvertently disturbed the crime scene by rummaging around, looking for any missing items. She became concerned because a neighbour discovered the two phones that Kercher normally carried with her in a nearby garden. Romanelli asked the police to force open Kercher's bedroom door, but they declined. Romanelli's male friend forced the door open around 1:15 pm. The body of Kercher was found inside, lying on the floor, covered by a duvet.

=== Autopsy ===
Pathologist Luca Lalli, from Perugia's forensic-science institute, performed the autopsy on Kercher's body. Her injuries consisted of 16 bruises and seven cuts, including a fatal cut to the neck. These included several bruises and a few insubstantial cuts on the palm of her hand. Bruises on her nose, nostrils, mouth, and underneath her jaw were compatible with a hand being clamped over her mouth and nose. Lalli's autopsy report was reviewed by three pathologists from Perugia's forensic-science institute, who interpreted the injuries, including some to the genital region, as indicating an attempt to immobilise Kercher during sexual violence.

=== Burial ===
A funeral was held on 14 December 2007 at Croydon Minster, with more than 300 people in attendance, followed by a private burial at Mitcham Road Cemetery. The degree that Kercher would have received in 2009 was awarded posthumously by the University of Leeds.

=== Meredith Kercher scholarship fund ===
Five years after the murder, the city of Perugia and its University for Foreigners, in co-operation with the Italian embassy in London, instituted a scholarship fund to honour the memory of Meredith Kercher. John Kercher stated in an interview that all profits from his book Meredith would go to a charitable foundation in Meredith Kercher's name.

=== Italian criminal procedure ===
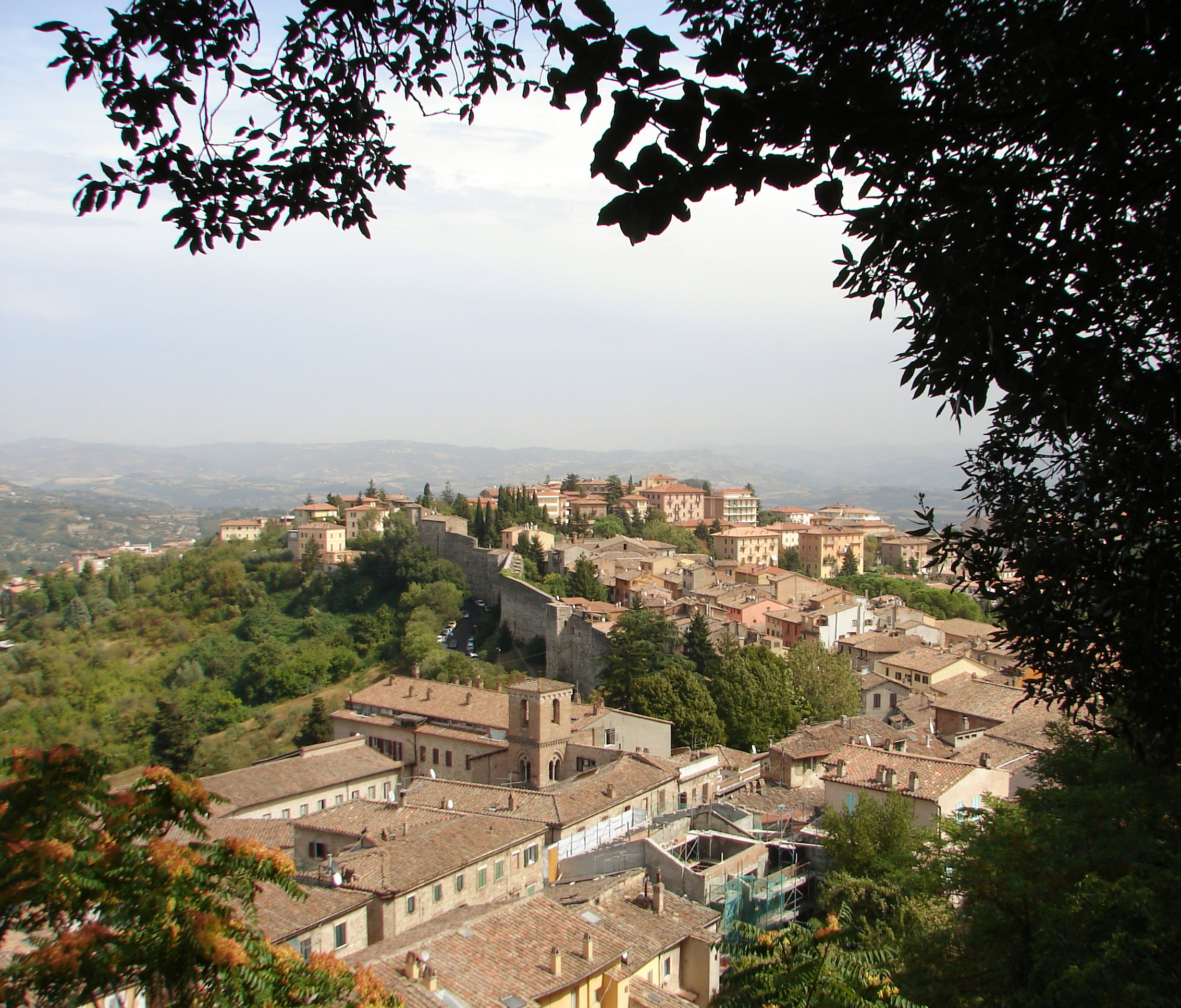
A panorama of Perugia, the city where Kercher, Knox and Sollecito were students

In Italy, as in most countries, individuals accused of any crime are considered innocent until proven guilty, although the defendant may be held in detention. Unless the accused opts for a fast-track trial, murder cases are heard by a corte d'assise or court of assizes. This court has jurisdiction to try the most serious crimes, i.e., those crimes whose maximum penalty begins at 24 years in prison. A guilty verdict is not regarded as a definitive conviction until the accused has exhausted the appeals process, regardless of the number of times the defendant has been put on trial.

Italian trials can last many months and have long gaps between hearings; the first trial of Knox and Sollecito was heard two days a week, for three weeks a month. If found guilty, a defendant is guaranteed what is in effect a retrial, where all evidence and witnesses can be re-examined.

A verdict can be overturned by the Italian supreme court, the Corte di Cassazione (cassation is the annulment of a judicial decision), which considers written briefs. If the Corte di Cassazione overturns a verdict, it explains which legal principles were violated by the lower court, which in turn must abide by the ruling when retrying the case. If the Corte di Cassazione upholds a guilty verdict of the appeal trial, the conviction becomes definitive, the appeals process is exhausted, and any sentence is served.

== Rudy Guede ==
=== Early life ===
Mug shot of Rudy Hermann Guede from earlier in 2007 before his arrest for murder

Rudy Hermann Guede (born 26 December 1986, Abidjan, Ivory Coast) was 20 years old at the time of the murder. He had lived in Perugia since the age of five with his polygamous immigrant father. In Italy, Guede was mostly raised with the help of his school teachers, a local priest, and others. Guede's father returned to Ivory Coast in 2004. Rudy drifted and was fed, clothed, and housed by an informal group of well-meaning households, until the age of 17 when he was adopted by a wealthy Perugian family. He played basketball for the Perugia youth team in the 2004–2005 season.

Guede repeatedly skipped school, and he did not show any interest in the jobs that his adoptive family arranged for him. His adoptive family asked him to leave their home in mid-2007.

=== Involvement in the case ===
Guede said that he had met two of the Italian men of the Via della Pergola 7 house while spending evenings at the basketball court in the Piazza Grimana. The young men who lived in the downstairs flat at Via della Pergola 7 were unable to recall when exactly Guede had met them but recalled how, after his first visit to their home, they had found him later in the bathroom, sitting asleep on the unflushed toilet, which was full of faeces. Allegedly, Guede committed break-ins, including one of a lawyer's office through a second-floor window, and another during which he burgled a flat and brandished a pocket knife when confronted by its inhabitants. On 27 October 2007, days before Kercher's murder, Guede was arrested in Milan after breaking into a nursery school; he was found by police with an 11 in (28 cm) knife, which he had taken from the school kitchen.

Guede went to a friend's house around 11:30 pm on 1 November 2007, the night of the murder. He went to a nightclub where he stayed until 4:30 am. On the following night, 2 November 2007, Guede went to the same nightclub with three American female students whom he had met in a bar. He then left Italy for Germany, where he was located in the subsequent weeks.

=== Arrest ===
After his fingerprints were found at the crime scene, along with DNA traces, Guede was extradited from Germany; he had said on the internet that he knew he was a suspect and wanted to clear his name.

=== Trial ===
Guede opted for a fast-track trial, held in closed session with no reporters present. He told the court that he had gone to Via della Pergola 7 on a date arranged with Kercher, after meeting her the previous evening. Two neighbours of Guede's, foreign female students who were with him at a nightclub on that evening, told police the only girl they saw him talking to had long, blonde hair. Guede said Kercher had let him in the cottage around 9:00 p.m. Sollecito's lawyers said a glass fragment from the window found beside a shoeprint of Guede's at the scene of the crime was proof that Guede had broken in.

Guede said that he and Kercher had kissed and touched, but they did not have sexual intercourse because they did not have condoms readily available. He claimed that he then developed stomach pains and crossed to the large bathroom on the other side of the apartment. Guede claimed he heard Kercher scream while he was in the bathroom, and that upon emerging, he saw a "shadowy figure" holding a knife and standing over her as she lay bleeding on the floor. Guede further said that the figure fled, while saying "in perfect Italian," "Trovato negro, trovato colpevole; andiamo" ("Found black man, found culprit; let's go").

The court found that his version of events did not match the scientific evidence, and that he could not explain why one of his palm prints, stained with Kercher's blood, had been found on the pillow of the single bed, under the disrobed body. Guede said he had left Kercher fully dressed.

Guede originally said that Knox had not been at the scene of the crime, but he later changed his statement to say that she had been in the apartment at the time of the murder. He claimed that he had heard her arguing with Kercher, and that, glancing out of a window, he had seen Knox's silhouette outside the house.

In October 2008, Guede was found guilty for the sexual assault and murder of Meredith Kercher. He was sentenced to 30 years' imprisonment. Judge Micheli acquitted Guede of the charge of theft.

=== Appeal ===
Three weeks after Knox and Sollecito were convicted, Guede had his prison term cut from 30 to 24 years. Then the automatic one-third reduction of a sentence decided in a fast-track trial kicked in, resulting in a final sentence of 16 years. A lawyer representing the Kercher family protested at the effective "drastic reduction" of the sentence.

=== Imprisonment and release ===
Guede was first granted day release from the Viterbo prison in 2017 to complete a master's degree in sociology, and in December 2020 the authorities entrusted him to social services to carry out the rest of his sentence doing community service. He was working in the mornings at the Catholic charity Caritas and in the afternoons he was allowed to work in the library of the prison's criminology centre.

On 12 November 2021, Guede was released from prison, having served a total of 13 years prison time compared to the original conviction of thirty years, which had been reduced subsequently to sixteen after a court in Viterbo agreed to further reduce his sentence. Francesco Maresca, the lawyer representing the Kercher family, stated to La Stampa that, although it was "normal" for prison sentences to be reduced, a "moral reflection" should be exercised to assess if "such a low [effective] sentence could be sufficient for a murder of this kind," adding that this would be another development he'd need to "explain to the Kercher family."

In December 2023, a woman (Note: Under the Guidelines on Media Reporting on Violence against Women, issued by the organisation Journalists against Violence against Women, and supported by the United Nations Development Programme, "the identity of the survivor/victim and her family members should not be revealed" as long as court proceedings are underway. See JAVAW 2021.) who had been Guede's girlfriend filed a complaint for physical abuse to the Rome police and a 500 metres (550 yd) restraining order was issued to Guede and he was placed under a set of various obligations. These include, among other measures, a total ban from having any contact whatsoever with the former girlfriend, including contacts through social media, the obligation to wear an electronic bracelet at all times, and to inform police before he leaves his city of residence, Viterbo.

In February 2024, a Roman court ruled that Guede would spend the next twelve months under a "special surveillance" regime for having allegedly abused his former girlfriend. On his Facebook page, Guede complained that he is the victim of a media hunt and claimed he is being punished for his past. In July 2025 Guede was in court facing trial for sexual assault and violence against a former girlfriend.

== Amanda Knox and Raffaele Sollecito ==
Timeline

2007

Late Aug: Meredith Kercher arrives in Perugia.

10 Sep: Kercher moves into Via della Pergola 7, renting a room from two Italian flatmates.

20 Sep: Amanda Knox rents the fourth bedroom.

Mid Oct: Rudy Guede meets Kercher and Knox.

25 Oct: Knox starts dating Raffaele Sollecito.

1 Nov: Kercher murdered in her bedroom.

2–6 Nov. Knox and Sollecito questioned by police without lawyers.

6 Nov: Knox implicates herself and Patrick Lumumba. Knox, Sollecito, and Lumumba arrested.

19 Nov: Fingerprints at crime scene identified as Guede's; DNA later identified as his.

20 Nov: Guede arrested in Germany; Lumumba released.

2008

1 Apr: Supreme Court of Italy upholds detention of Knox, Sollecito, Guede.

29 Oct: Guede sentenced to 30 years. Knox and Sollecito charged with murder, sexual assault.

2009

16 Jan: Trial of Knox and Sollecito begins.

18 Nov: Guede's appeal begins.

21 Nov: Prosecution requests life for Knox, Sollecito, and nine months' solitary confinement for Knox.

4 Dec: Knox sentenced to 26 years, Sollecito 25.

22 Dec: Guede's sentence reduced to 16 years on appeal.

2010

May: Guede files second appeal.

24 Nov: Knox, Sollecito appeal opens.

16 Dec: Italy's Court of Cassation upholds Guede's conviction.

2011

29 Jun: Independent experts say forensic evidence against Knox, Sollecito is flawed.

3 Oct: Second-level trial finds Knox and Sollecito not guilty.

2013

26 Mar: Verdict set aside. Case to be reheard.

2014

30 Jan: Second level reheard.

2015

27 Mar: Italian Supreme court definitively exonerates Knox and Sollecito.

Sources
- CBS News, 30 Sep 2011.
- Dempsey, Candace. Murder in Italy. Berkley Books, 2010 edition, p. 327ff.
- Reuters, 21 Sep 2011.
- The Washington Post, 3 Oct 2011.
- The New York Times, 26 Mar 2013.
- Fox News, 30 Jan 2014.

After the discovery of Kercher's body, Perugia Reparto volanti (Mobile Squad) Detective Superintendent Monica Napoleoni told colleagues that the murderer was definitely not a burglar and that apparent signs of a break-in were staged as a deliberate deception. Knox was the only occupant of the house who had been nearby on the night of the murder. Knox also said that she had spent the night of 1 November with Sollecito at his flat, smoking marijuana, watching the French film Amélie and having sex. Sollecito told police he could not remember if Knox was with him that evening or not.

Over the next four days, Knox was repeatedly interviewed without being given access to a lawyer. On 6 November, Knox told investigators that Patrick Lumumba, the owner of the bar Knox was employed at part-time, had broken into the home she shared with Kercher and other roommates, before sexually assaulting and killing Kercher. She later testified that she was subjected to pressure tactics and struck by police to make her incriminate herself. She was arrested and charged with murder at noon on 6 November 2007.

=== Arrests ===
Napoleoni was backed by several other detectives in arguing for the arrest of Knox, Sollecito, and Lumumba, the latter of whom Knox had implicated as being involved. However, Napoleoni's immediate superior, Chief Superintendent Marco Chiacchiera, thought arrests would be premature and advocated close surveillance of the suspects as the best way to further the investigation. On 8 November 2007, Knox, Sollecito, and Lumumba appeared before Judge Claudia Matteini, and during an hour-long adjournment, Knox met her lawyers for the first time. Matteini ordered Knox, Sollecito, and Lumumba to be detained for a year. On 19 November 2007, the Rome forensic police matched fingerprints found in Kercher's bedroom to Rudy Guede. On 20 November 2007, Guede was arrested in Germany, and Lumumba was released. The prosecution charged Guede with the murder.

=== Pretrial publicity ===
Knox became the subject of intense media attention. Shortly before her trial, she began legal action against Fiorenza Sarzanini, the author of a best-selling book about her, which had been published in Italy. The book included accounts of events as imagined or invented by Sarzanini, witness transcripts not in the public record, and selected excerpts from Knox's private journals, which Sarzanini had somehow obtained. Lawyers for Knox said the book had "reported in a prurient manner, aimed solely at arousing the morbid imagination of readers".

According to American legal commentator Kendal Coffey, "In this country we would say, with this kind of media exposure, you could not get a fair trial". In the United States, a pretrial publicity campaign supported Knox and attacked Italian investigators, but her lawyer thought it was counterproductive.

=== Knox and Sollecito trials ===
Knox and Sollecito were held in prison. Their trial began on 16 January 2009 before Judge Giancarlo Massei, Deputy Judge Beatrice Cristiani, and six lay judges at the Corte d'Assise of Perugia. The charges were that Knox, Sollecito, and Guede had murdered Kercher in her bedroom. Knox and Sollecito both pleaded not guilty.

According to the prosecution, Knox had attacked Kercher in her bedroom, repeatedly banged her head against a wall, forcefully held her face, and tried to strangle her. Prosecutor Giuliano Mignini suggested Knox had taunted Kercher and may have said, "You acted the goody-goody so much, now we are going to show you. Now you're going to be forced to have sex!" The prosecution hypothesised that Guede, Knox, and Sollecito had removed Kercher's jeans, and held her on her hands and knees while Guede sexually abused her; that Knox had cut Kercher with a knife before inflicting the fatal stab wound; and that she had then stolen Kercher's mobile phones and money to fake a burglary. On 5 December 2009, Knox and Sollecito were convicted of murder and sentenced to 26 and 25 years' imprisonment, respectively.

The appeal (or second grade) trial began in November 2010, presided over by Judges Claudio Pratillo Hellmann and Massimo Zanetti. A court-ordered review of the contested DNA evidence by independent experts noted numerous basic errors in the gathering and analysis of the evidence, and concluded that no evidential trace of Kercher's DNA had been found on the alleged murder weapon. Although the review confirmed the DNA fragments on the bra clasp included some from Sollecito, an expert testified that the context strongly suggested contamination.

On 3 October 2011, Knox and Sollecito were acquitted. A ruling that proof was insufficient, similar to the verdict of not proven, was available to the court, but the court acquitted Knox and Sollecito completely. The conviction of Knox on a charge of slander of Patrick Lumumba was upheld, and the original one-year sentence was increased to three years and eleven days' imprisonment.

In their official report on the court's decision to overturn the convictions, the appeal trial judges wrote that the verdict of guilty at the original trial "was not corroborated by any objective element of evidence". Describing the police interviews of Knox as of "obsessive duration", the judges said that the statements she made incriminating herself and Lumumba during interrogation were evidence of her confusion while under "great psychological pressure". The judges further noted that a tramp who had testified to seeing Sollecito and Knox in the Piazza Grimana on the night of the murder was a heroin addict; that Massei, the judge at the 2009 trial, had used the word "probably" 39 times in his report; and that no evidence existed of any phone calls or texts between Knox or Sollecito, and Guede.

==== New trial ====
Following a successful prosecution request, a rehearing of Knox and Sollecito's second-level trial was held. The only new evidence came from the court-ordered analysis of a previously unexamined sample of the blade of Sollecito's kitchen knife, which the prosecution had alleged was the murder weapon. When the unexamined sample was tested by court-appointed experts for the new appeal trial, no DNA belonging to Kercher was found. Despite the negative result for the prosecution case, the court returned verdicts of guilty against the defendants, who both appealed.

==== Acquittal of murder charge ====
On 27 March 2015, Italy's highest court, the Court of Cassation, ruled that Knox and Sollecito were innocent of murder, thereby definitively ending the case. Rather than merely declaring that errors occurred in the earlier court cases or that evidence was insufficient to convict, the court ruled that Knox and Sollecito had not committed the murder and were innocent of those charges, but it upheld Knox's conviction for slandering Patrick Lumumba.

After this verdict was announced, Knox, who had been in the United States continuously since 2011, said in a statement: "The knowledge of my innocence has given me strength in the darkest times of this ordeal."

In September 2015, the delegate supreme judge, court adviser Gennaro Marasca, made public the reasons of absolution. First, none of the evidence demonstrated that either Knox or Sollecito was present at the crime scene. Second, they cannot have "materially participated in the homicide", since absolutely no "biological traces ... could be attributed to them in the room of the murder or on the body of the victim where, by contrast, numerous traces were found attributable to Guede".

== Sources ==
- Burleigh, Nina (2011). The Fatal Gift of Beauty: The Trials of Amanda Knox. Broadway. ISBN 9780307588593.
- Dempsey, Candace (2010). Murder in Italy. Berkley Books. ISBN 9781101187111.
- Follain, John (2011). Death in Perugia: The Definitive Account of the Meredith Kercher Case from her Murder to the Acquittal of Raffaele Sollecito and Amanda Knox. Hodder & Stoughton. ISBN 9781848942073.
- JAVAW (2021). "Guidelines on Media Reporting on Violence against Women" (PDF). United Nations.
