= Candace Dempsey =

American author and journalist

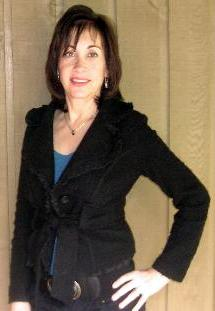
- Born: Spokane, Washington
- Education: University of Oregon (M.A.)
- Occupations: Author, journalist, travel writer, blogger
- Website: Candacedempsey.com

Candace Dempsey is an American author, journalist and travel writer. She has written for several magazines in the United States, and is the author of Murder in Italy (2010), a study of the 2007 murder of Meredith Kercher and the trials of Amanda Knox and Raffaele Sollecito.

Dempsey has been interviewed about the Kercher investigation for CNN, including Anderson Cooper 360, MSNBC, the BBC, KOMO TV, and Italian television. She maintains a blog about the case, "Let's Talk About True Crime," hosted by the Seattle Post-Intelligencer.

== Background ==
Dempsey's ancestry is Italian on her mother's side, and German-Irish on her father's. She attended West Valley High School in Spokane, obtained her master's in journalism from the University of Oregon School of Journalism, and began her career in 1976 as an intern at The Spokesman-Review in Spokane. In 1977 she married Mark Rosenblum, a New Yorker. The couple lived in Albany, New York, and Boston, Massachusetts, for a few years before moving to Seattle.

Dempsey has worked as an editor, writer and producer for MSN, an independent travel writer, and has written for publications such as The Chicago Tribune, The Boston Phoenix, Slate and The New York Times.

She became known in particular for her research into the 2007 murder of Meredith Kercher in Perugia, Italy. Her blog on the investigation was one of the first to post court documents about the case, and her book about the murder and criminal inquiry, Murder in Italy, received Best True Crime Book Reviews Editor's and Readers' awards for 2010. Dempsey was present in the courtroom in Perugia in October 2011 when Amanda Knox and Raffaele Sollecito were acquitted of Kercher's murder.

== Selected works ==
- (2010). Murder in Italy: The Shocking Slaying of a British Student, the Accused American Girl, and an International Scandal. Penguin/Berkley Books.
- (2001). "A Restless Night on the Mojave", Passionfruit.
- (1998). "Girl Kayak Guides of Juneau," in Marybeth Bond and Pamela Michael (eds.). Travelers Tales' A Woman's Passion for Travel. Travelers' Tales Books.
- (1996). "Alone again," in Susan Fox Rogers (ed.). Solo: On Her Own Adventure. Seal Press; reproduced in Faith Conlon, Ingrid Emerick and Jennie Good (eds.). (1998). Gifts of the Wild: A Woman's Book of Adventure. Seal Press.
