= Villarbasse massacre =

Last instance of death sentence in Italy

Giovanni Puleo, Francesco La Barbera and Giovanni D'Ignoti after their arrest

The Villarbasse massacre took place on November 20, 1945, in Villarbasse, about 20 km from Turin, when four men from Sicily (Pietro Lala, Giovanni D'Ignoti, Giovanni Puleo, and Francesco La Barbera) killed ten people during a robbery. The perpetrators were sentenced to death, for the last application of capital punishment for common crimes in Italy.

== Background ==
In November 1945, just after the end of World War II, Pietro Lala (aged 20) quit his job in a farm—known as "cascina Simonetto"—pretending an inheritance he was given by his family in Sicily. During the night of November 20 and 21, helped by his accomplices, he entered into the farm to carry out a robbery. The group clubbed ten people and threw them, still alive, down a well. After committing the robbery, they also stole clothes, food and 45,000 Liras each.

The victims' bodies were found days later, leading to investigations in which D'Ignoti, Puleo and La Barbera were caught. Lala came back to Sicily where, despite using the alias of Francesco Saporito, he was killed on April 11, 1946, by the Mafia. On July 5, 1946, the Corte d'Assise sentenced the remaining three defendants to death.

=== Victims ===
- Massimo Gianoli
- Teresa Delfino
- Antonio Ferrero
- Anna Varetto
- Renato Morra
- Fiorina Maffiotto
- Rosa Martinoli
- Marcello Gastaldi
- Domenico Rosso

== Execution and aftermath ==
D'Ignoti, Puleo and La Barbera were executed by a 36-man firing squad on March 4, 1947, at 7:45 AM Head of State Enrico De Nicola refused to commute their sentences to life in prison. It was the last execution for common crimes in Italy. The last execution for war crimes took place the following day, against three former members of the Italian Social Republic.

The Italian Parliament eventually abolished capital punishment in early 1948.

== See also ==
- Capital punishment in Italy

== Sources ==
- Andrea Accorsi; Massimo Centini (2006). Newton Compton Editori (ed.). Delitti italiani risolti o irrisolti (in Italian). Newton Compton. p. 574. ISBN 88-541-0707-7.
