= Amanda Knox =

American writer and activist (born 1987)

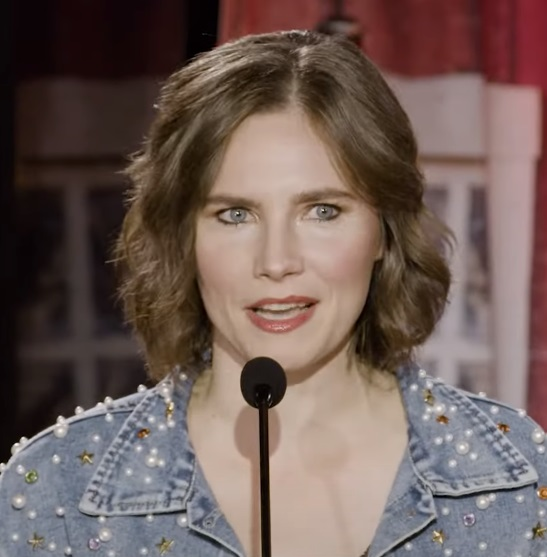
- Knox in 2023
- Born: Amanda Marie Knox; July 9, 1987 (age 39); Seattle, Washington, U.S.
- Education: University of Washington (BA)
- Known for: Wrongful conviction and acquittal for the murder of Meredith Kercher
- Spouse: Christopher Robinson (m. 2020)
- Children: 2
- Website: Official website

Amanda Marie Knox (born July 9, 1987) is an American author and stand-up comedian. She came to international prominence during her trial for the November 2007 murder of her roommate, Meredith Kercher, in Perugia, Italy. The trial and her conviction were highly publicized in 2009 as was her acquittal two years later.

She was convicted of the murder of Kercher in 2009 and was sentenced to 26 years in prison. In 2011, the conviction was overturned and Knox was released, whereupon she returned to America. In 2013, her acquittal was overturned after a successful prosecution appeal and a retrial was ordered. In 2014, an appeals court in Florence convicted Knox of murder for a second time. In 2015, the Italian Supreme Court of Cassation definitively acquitted Knox of Kercher's murder.

Knox has since begun a comedy career. In 2026, Knox announced a comedy show at the Edinburgh Fringe Festival called "Cartwheel" that focuses on the events in Perugia. The title referenced a story that had claimed she did cartwheels in the police station after Kercher's death.

== Early life ==
Amanda Knox was born July 9, 1987, in Seattle, Washington, the eldest of three daughters born to Edda Mellas, a mathematics teacher originally from Germany, and Curt Knox, a vice president of finance for Macy's. Knox and her sisters were raised in West Seattle. Her parents divorced when she was a child. Her mother later married Chris Mellas, an information-technology consultant.

Knox first traveled to Italy at age 15, on a family holiday. During that trip, she visited Rome, Pisa, the Amalfi Coast, and the ruins of Pompeii. Upon reading Under the Tuscan Sun, which was given to her by her mother, she grew more interested in the country.

Knox graduated from the Seattle Preparatory School in 2005 and then studied linguistics at the University of Washington. In 2007, she made the dean's list at the university. She worked at part-time jobs to fund an academic year in Italy. Relatives described the 20-year-old Knox as outgoing but unwary. Her stepfather had strong reservations about her going to Italy that year, because he found her too naïve.

== Italy ==
=== Via della Pergola 7 ===
Knox went to Perugia for its universities and because it had fewer tourists than Florence, a more popular destination for foreign students. Knox lived in a four-bedroom, ground-floor apartment at Via della Pergola 7 with three other women. Her flatmates were Meredith Kercher (a British exchange student) and two Italian trainee lawyers in their late twenties, one of whom was Filomena Romanelli. Kercher and Knox moved in on September 10 and 20, 2007, respectively, meeting each other for the first time. Knox was employed part-time at a bar, Le Chic, which was owned by a Congolese-French man, Diya Patrick Lumumba. Kercher's English female friends saw relatively little of Knox, who preferred to socialize with Italians.

Giacomo Silenzi, who lived in a walk-out semi-basement apartment of the building, shared an interest in music with Kercher and Knox and often visited their apartment. Returning home at 2 a.m. one night in mid-October, Knox, Kercher, Silenzi, and another basement resident met a basketball court acquaintance of the Italians, Rudy Guede, in the basement apartment. At 4:30 a.m. Kercher left, saying she was going to bed, and Knox followed her out. Guede spent the rest of the night in the basement. Knox recalled a second night out with Kercher and Silenzi in which Guede joined them in the basement apartment.

Three weeks before her death, Kercher went with Knox to the EuroChocolate festival. On October 20, Kercher became romantically involved with Silenzi after going to a nightclub with him as part of a small group that included Knox. Guede visited the basement later that day. On October 25, Kercher and Knox went to a concert, where Knox met Raffaele Sollecito, a 23-year-old software engineering student. Knox began spending her time at his flat, a five-minute walk from Via della Pergola 7.

=== Discovery of Meredith Kercher's body ===
November 1 was a public holiday, and the Italians living in the building were away. It is believed that after watching a movie at a friend's house, Kercher returned home around 9 pm and was alone in the building. Just after midday on November 2, Knox called Kercher's English phone. But contrary to her normal practice, the call was not answered. Knox was the first person to return to the cottage the morning after the murder. Knox then called her roommate Filomena Romanelli, and in a mixture of Italian and English said she was worried something had happened to Kercher, because upon going to the Via della Pergola 7 apartment earlier that morning, Knox had noticed an open front door, bloodstains (including a footprint) in the bathroom, and Kercher's bedroom door locked. Knox and Sollecito then went to Via della Pergola 7, and upon getting no answer from Kercher, unsuccessfully tried to break in the bedroom door, leaving it noticeably damaged. At 12:47 p.m., Knox called her mother, who advised her to contact the police.

Sollecito called the Carabinieri, the national gendarmerie of Italy, getting through at 12:51 p.m. He was recorded telling them there had been a break-in with nothing taken, and the emergency was that Kercher's door was locked, she was not answering calls to her phone, and there were bloodstains. Police telecommunications investigators arrived to inquire about an abandoned phone, which was in fact Kercher's Italian unit. Romanelli arrived and took over, explaining the situation to the police who were informed about Kercher's English phone, which had been handed in as a result of its ringing when Knox called it. On discovering Kercher's English phone had been found dumped, Romanelli demanded that the policemen force Kercher's bedroom door open, but they did not think the circumstances warranted damaging private property. The door was then kicked in by a friend of Romanelli, and Kercher's body was discovered on the floor. She had been stabbed and had died of blood loss from neck wounds.

=== Investigation ===
The first detectives on the scene were Monica Napoleoni and her superior Marco Chiacchiera. Napoleoni conducted the initial interviews and quizzed Knox about her failure to immediately raise the alarm, which was later widely seen as an anomalous feature of Knox's behavior, in fact she was completely unconcerned about the death of her roommate. Knox said that she had spent the night of 1 November with Sollecito at his flat, smoking marijuana, watching the French film Amélie, and having sex. Sollecito told police he could not remember if Knox was with him that evening or not. According to Knox, Napoleoni had been hostile to her from the outset. Chiacchiera discounted the signs of a break-in, deeming them clearly faked by the killer. The police were not told the extent of Kercher's relationship with Silenzi in initial interviews. On November 4, Chiacchiera was quoted as saying that someone known to Kercher might have been let into the apartment and be responsible for her murder. The same day, Guede is believed to have left Perugia.

=== Interviews, arrest, and arraignment ===
Over the following days, Knox was repeatedly interviewed as a witness. She told police that on November 1, she received a text from Lumumba advising that her evening waitressing shift had been cancelled, so she had stayed over at Sollecito's apartment, only going back to the apartment she shared with Kercher on the morning the body was discovered. On the night of November 5, Knox voluntarily went to the police station. Knox was not provided with legal counsel, as Italian law only mandates the appointment of a lawyer for someone suspected of a crime and not for anyone willingly giving information without being a witness. Knox said she had requested a lawyer but was told it would make things worse for her.

Knox testified that prior to the trial she had spent hours maintaining her original story, that she had been with Sollecito at his flat all night and had no knowledge of the murder, but a group of police would not believe her. (Note: Knox said, "I wasn't just stressed and pressurised; I was manipulated"; she testified to being told by the interpreter, "probably I didn't remember well because I was traumatised. So I should try to remember something else." Knox stated, "they said they were convinced that I was protecting someone. They were saying 'Who is it? Who is it?' They were saying: 'Here's the message on your telephone, you wanted to meet up with him, you are a stupid liar." Knox also said that a policewoman "was saying 'Come on, come on, remember' and then – slap – she hit me. Then 'come on, come on' and – slap – another one". Knox said she was not allowed access to food, water, or the bathroom. Ficarra and policewoman Lorena Zugarini testified that during the interview, Knox was given access to food, water, hot drinks, and the lavatory. They further said Knox was asked about a lawyer but did not have one, was not hit at any time, and interviewed "firmly but politely".)

Police arrested Knox, Sollecito, and Patrick Lumumba on November 6, 2007. They were taken into custody and charged with the murder. (Note: In 1989, Italy reformed its inquisitorial system, introducing elements of US-style adversarial procedure. The changes were intended to remove an inquisitorial continuity between the investigatory phase and the basis for a decision at trial, but in practice, they took control of inquiries away from police and gave prosecutors authority over the preliminary investigation. Although they have considerable authority over early inquiries and discretion in bringing charges, Italian prosecutors do not customarily use their powers in the aggressive way common in the US system. Unless the defendant opts for a fast-track trial (a relatively inquisitorial procedure), murder trials are heard by a corte d'assise, which is less likely to exclude evidence as prejudicial than a US court. Two presiding professional trial judges, who also vote on the verdict, are expected to correct any bias of the six lay judges during their deliberations. An acquittal can be appealed by the prosecution, and faulty application of legal principles in the judges' detailed report on their decision can be grounds for overturning the verdict. A defendant who gives evidence is not given an oath, because they are not considered to be a witness. The settled verdict of another court can be used without collaboration to support circumstantial evidence; in Knox's case, the official report on Guede's conviction was introduced as showing that Guede had accomplices. If the Supreme Court grants an appeal against a guilty verdict, it usually sends the case back to be re-heard. It can also dismiss the prosecution case, although this is rare.) Customers who Lumumba had been serving at his bar on the night of the murder gave him an alibi, and Lumumba was released. (Note: In a formal interview with Perugia prosecutor Giuliano Mignini, Knox said she had been brainwashed by police interrogators into accusing Lumumba and implicating herself.) Chiacchiera, who thought the arrests were premature, dropped out of the investigation soon afterward, leaving Napoleoni in charge of a major investigation for the first time in her career.

Knox's first meeting with her legal counsel was on November 11.

After his bloodstained fingerprints were found on bedding under Kercher's body, Guede (who had fled to Germany) was extradited back to Italy. Guede, Knox, and Sollecito were then charged with committing the murder together. On November 30, a panel of three judges endorsed the charges and ordered Knox and Sollecito held in detention pending a trial.

Knox became the subject of unprecedented pre-trial media coverage because of leaks from the prosecution, including a best-selling Italian book whose author imagined or invented incidents that were purported to have occurred in Knox's private life.

=== Trial of Guede ===
Guede fled to Germany shortly after the murder. During a November 19, 2007 Skype conversation with his friend Giacomo Benedetti, Guede did not mention Knox or Sollecito as being in the building on the night of the murder. Later his account changed and he indirectly implicated them in the murder, which he denied involvement in. Guede was arrested in Germany on November 20, then extradited to Italy on December 6. Guede opted to be tried in a special fast-track procedure by Judge Micheli. He was not charged with having had a knife. He did not testify and was not questioned about his statements, which he had changed compared to what he originally said.

In October 2008, Guede was found guilty of the sexual assault and murder of Kercher and sentenced to 30 years' imprisonment. His prison sentence was ultimately reduced to 16 years. He was later given an early release in December 2020 and authorized to finish his sentence with community service. Amanda Knox was dissatisfied with his early release and spoke publicly against it. (Note: Guede was convicted of murder, but the official judges' report on the conviction specified that he had not had a knife or stabbed the victim, or stolen any of Kercher's possessions. Micheli's finding that Guede must have had an accomplice gave support to the later prosecution of Knox.) (Note: The judges reasoned that Guede would not have faked a burglary, because it would have pointed to him in view of his own earlier break-ins (though at the time of the murder he was known to police only for being detained for trespassing in Florence). Despite Guede saying that Kercher had let him in through the entry door, the judges decided against the possibility of Guede's having gotten in by simply knocking on the door, because they thought Kercher would not have opened the cottage door to him (although she knew he was an acquaintance of her boyfriend, Giacomo Silenzi). In his original account, Guede had said that Kercher's confrontation with her killer had started at the entry door. One legal commentator on the case thought that insufficient consideration had been given to the possibility that Guede had called at the house on some pretext while Kercher was alone there, murdered her after she opened the door to him, and faked a burglary to cover his tracks.)

=== First trial of Knox and Sollecito ===
In 2009, Knox and Sollecito pleaded not guilty at a corte d'assise on charges of murder, sexual assault, carrying a knife (which Guede had not been charged with), simulating a burglary, and theft of €300, two credit cards, and two mobile phones. There was no charge in relation to Kercher's missing keys to the entry door and her bedroom door, although Guede's trial judgement said he had not stolen anything. There was a separate but concurrent trial of Knox with the same jury as her murder trial, in which she was accused of falsely denouncing her employer for the murder. Knox's police interrogation was deemed improper and ruled inadmissible for the murder trial, but was heard in her nominally separate trial for false denunciation.

==== Prosecution case ====
According to the prosecution, Knox's first call of November 2, to Kercher's English phone, was to ascertain if Kercher's phones had been found, and Sollecito had tried to break in the bedroom door because after he and Knox locked it behind them, they realized they had left something that might incriminate them. Knox's call to her mother in Seattle, 15 minutes before the discovery of the body, was said by prosecutors to show Knox was acting as if something serious might have happened before the point in time when an innocent person would have such concern.

A prosecution witness, homeless man Antonio Curatolo, said Knox and Sollecito were in a nearby square on the night of the murder. Prosecutors advanced a single piece of forensic evidence linking Sollecito to Kercher's bedroom, where the murder had taken place: fragments of his DNA on Kercher's bra clasp. Giulia Bongiorno, leading Sollecito's defence, questioned how Sollecito's DNA could have gotten on the small metal clasp of the bra, but not on the fabric of the bra back strap from which it was torn. "How can you touch the hook without touching the cloth?" Bongiorno asked. The back strap of the bra had multiple traces of DNA belonging to Guede. According to the prosecution's reconstruction, Knox had attacked Kercher in her bedroom, repeatedly banged her head against a wall, forcefully held her face, and tried to strangle her. Guede, Knox, and Sollecito had removed Kercher's jeans and held her on her hands and knees while Guede had sexually assaulted her. Knox had cut Kercher with a knife before inflicting the fatal stab wound, then faked a burglary. The judge pointedly questioned Knox about a number of details, especially concerning her phone calls to her mother and Romanelli.

==== Defense case ====
The defense suggested that Guede was a lone killer who had murdered Kercher after breaking in. Knox's lawyers pointed out that no shoe prints, clothing fibers, hairs, fingerprints, skin cells, or DNA of Knox's were found on Kercher's body, clothes, handbag, or anywhere else in Kercher's bedroom. The prosecution alleged that all forensic traces in the room that would have incriminated Knox had been wiped away by her and Sollecito. Knox's lawyers said it would have been impossible to selectively remove her traces, and emphasized that Guede's shoe prints, fingerprints, and DNA were found in Kercher's bedroom.

Guede's DNA was on the strap of Kercher's bra, which had been torn off, and his DNA was found on a vaginal swab taken from her body. Guede's bloody palm print was on a pillow that had been placed under Kercher's hips. Guede's DNA, mixed with Kercher's, was on the left sleeve of her bloody sweatshirt and in bloodstains inside her shoulder bag, from which €300 and credit cards had been stolen. Both sets of defence lawyers requested the judges to order independent reviews of evidence including DNA and the compatibility of the wounds with the alleged murder weapon; the request was denied. In final pleas to the court, Sollecito's lawyer described Knox as "a weak and fragile girl" who had been "duped by the police". Knox's lawyer pointed to text messages between Knox and Kercher as showing that they had been friends.

=== Verdict and controversy ===
On December 5, 2009, Knox, by then 22, was convicted on charges of faking a break-in, defamation, sexual violence, and murder, and was sentenced to 26 years imprisonment. Sollecito was sentenced to 25 years. In Italy, opinion was not generally favorable toward Knox, and an Italian law professor remarked: "This is the simplest and fairest criminal trial one could possibly think of in terms of evidence."

In the United States, the verdict was widely viewed as a miscarriage of justice. American lawyers expressed concern about pre-trial publicity, and statements excluded from the murder case being allowed for a contemporaneous civil suit heard by the same jury. Knox's defense attorneys were seen, by American standards, as passive in the face of the prosecution's use of character assassination. Although acknowledging that Knox might have been a person of interest for American police in similar circumstances, journalist Nina Burleigh, who had spent months in Perugia during the trial while researching a book on the case, said the conviction had not been based on solid proof, and there had been resentment toward the Knox family that amounted to "anti-Americanism".

A number of US experts spoke out against DNA evidence used by the prosecution. According to consultant Greg Hampikian, director of the Idaho Innocence Project, the Italian forensic police could not replicate the key result, claimed to have successfully identified DNA at levels below those an American laboratory would attempt to analyze, and never supplied validation of their methods. Knox was indicted in 2010 on charges of defamation against the police for saying she had been struck across her head during the interview in which she incriminated herself.

In May 2011, Hampikian said forensic results from the crime scene pointed to Guede as the killer and to his having acted on his own.

== Acquittal and release ==
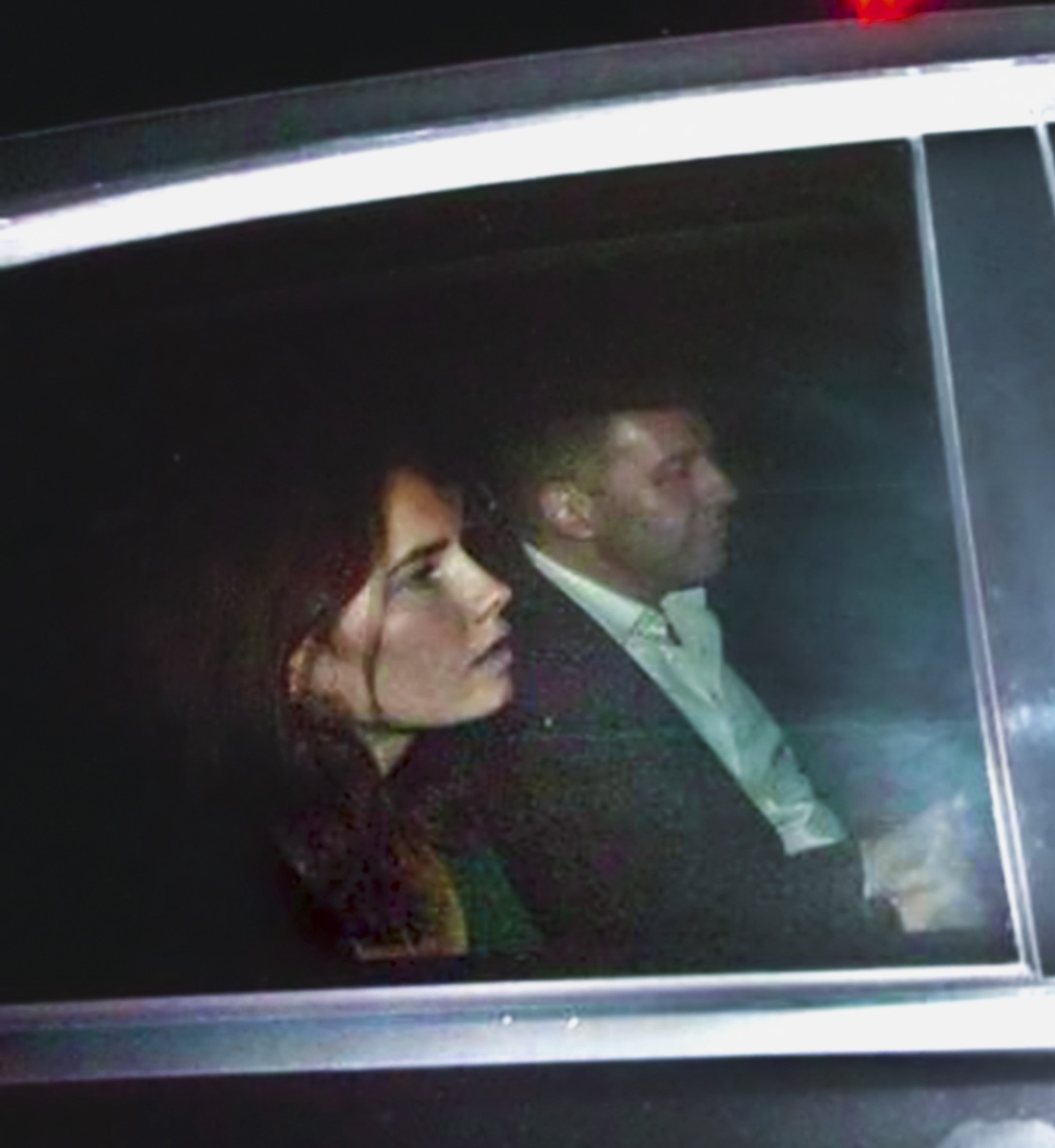
On October 3, 2011, Amanda Knox left Perugia Prison with Corrado Maria Daclon, secretary general of the Italy–USA Foundation.

A corte d'assise verdict of guilty is not a definitive conviction. A corte d'assise d'appello reviews the case in what is essentially a new trial. The appeal (or second grade) trial began November 2010 and was presided over by Judges Claudio Pratillo Hellmann and Massimo Zanetti. A court-ordered review of the contested DNA evidence by independent experts noted numerous basic errors in the gathering and analysis of the evidence, and concluded that no evidential trace of Kercher's DNA had been found on the alleged murder weapon, which police had found in Sollecito's kitchen. The review found the forensic police examination showed evidence of multiple males' DNA fragments on the bra clasp, which had been lost on the floor for 47 days. The court-appointed expert testified that the context strongly suggested contamination. On October 3, 2011, Knox and Sollecito were found not guilty of the murder.

In an official statement giving the grounds for the acquittals, Hellmann said Knox had been confused by interviews of "obsessive duration" in a language she was still learning, and forensic evidence did not support the idea that Knox and Sollecito had been present at the murder. It was emphasized that Knox's first calls raised the alarm and brought the police, which made the prosecution's assertion that she had been trying to delay discovery of the body untenable. Her and Sollecito's accounts failing to completely match did not constitute evidence that they had given a false alibi. Discounting Curatolo's testimony as self-contradictory, the judges observed that he was a heroin addict. Having noted that there was no evidence of any phone calls or texts between Knox or Sollecito and Guede, the judges concluded there was a "material non-existence" of evidence to support the guilty verdicts, and that an association among Sollecito, Knox, and Guede to commit the murder was "far from probable".

The false accusation conviction in relation to her employer was upheld, and Judge Hellman imposed a three-year sentence, although this did not result in additional incarceration, being less than Knox had already served. She was immediately released, whereupon she quickly returned to her Seattle home.

Knox wrote a letter to Corrado Maria Daclon, Secretary General of the Italy–USA Foundation, the day after regaining her freedom:

To hold my hand and offer support and respect throughout the obstacles and the controversy, there were Italians. There was the Italy–USA Foundation, and many others that shared my pain and that helped me survive, with hope. I am eternally grateful for their caring hospitality and their courageous commitment. To those that wrote me, that defended me, that stood by me, that prayed for me... I am forever grateful to you.

=== Retrial ===
On March 26, 2013, Italy's highest court, the Supreme Court of Cassation, set aside the acquittals of the Hellmann second level trial. The Court ruled that the Hellmann acquittals had gone beyond the remit of a corte d'assise d'appello by not ordering new DNA tests and by failing to give weight to circumstantial evidence in context, such as Knox's accusation against the bar owner in the disputed interviews. A note Knox composed in the police station (not mentioning Guede) was regarded by the Supreme Court as confirmation that she and Guede were present in Via della Pergola 7 while Kercher was attacked. A retrial was ordered. Knox was represented, but remained in the United States.

Judge Nencini presided at the retrial, and granted a prosecution request for analysis of a previously unexamined DNA sample found on a kitchen knife of Sollecito's, which the prosecution alleged was the murder weapon based on the forensic police reporting that Kercher's DNA was on it, a conclusion discredited by court-appointed experts at the appeal trial. When the unexamined sample was tested, no DNA belonging to Kercher was found. On January 30, 2014, Knox and Sollecito were found guilty. In their written explanation, the judges emphasized Guede's fast-track verdict report as a judicial reference point establishing that he had not acted alone. The Nencini verdict report said there must have been a cleanup to remove traces of Knox from the building while leaving Guede's. The report said that there had been no burglary, and the signs of one were staged.

=== Forensic controversy ===
Although not part of the defense's team of experts, an authority on the forensic use of DNA, Professor Peter Gill, publicly said that the case against Knox and Sollecito was misconceived because they had a legitimate excuse for their DNA being present on Sollecito's kitchen knife, and in the crime scene apartment. According to Gill, the DNA fragment from Sollecito on the bra clasp could have gotten there through Sollecito having touched the handle of Kercher's door while trying to force it, enabling transfer of his DNA to the bra clasp inside the bedroom on the latex gloves used by investigators.

=== Final decision ===
On March 27, 2015, the ultimate appeal by Knox and Sollecito was heard by the Supreme Court of Cassation; it ruled that the case was without foundation, thereby definitively acquitting them of the murder. Her defamation conviction was upheld, but the three-year sentence was deemed served by the time she had already spent in prison. Rather than merely declaring that there were errors in the earlier court cases or that there was not enough evidence to convict, the court ruled that Knox and Sollecito were innocent of involvement in the murder.

On September 7, 2015, the Court published the report on the acquittal, citing "glaring errors", "investigative amnesia", and "guilty omissions", where a five-judge panel said that the prosecutors who won the original murder conviction failed to prove a "whole truth" to back up the scenario that Knox and Sollecito killed Kercher. They also stated that there were "sensational failures" (clamorose defaillance) in the investigation, and that the lower court had been guilty of "culpable omissions" (colpevoli omissioni) in ignoring expert testimony that demonstrated contamination of evidence.

The delegate supreme judge, court adviser Gennaro Marasca, made public the reasons of absolution. First, none of the evidence demonstrated that either Knox or Sollecito was present at the crime scene. Second, they cannot have "materially participated in the homicide", since absolutely no "biological traces ... could be attributed to them in the room of the murder or on the body of the victim, where in contrast numerous traces were found attributable to Guede".

=== Compensation ===
On January 24, 2019, the European Court of Human Rights (ECHR) ordered Italy to pay compensation to Knox for violating her rights in the hours after her arrest in Perugia. Italy was ordered to pay Knox €18,400 (about US$20,800) for not providing her with either a lawyer or a competent interpreter when she was first held in custody.

=== Retrial of defamation of Patrick Lumumba ===
Based on the ECHR's ruling that she should have been provided with a lawyer and a competent interpreter during the "obsessively long" and implicitly violent police interviews (Knox had been acquitted of defamation for saying policewomen had struck her during the interrogation), Knox appealed her conviction for defamation of Patrick Lumumba, since the statement that he was involved was made during those interviews, at the same time that it was claimed that she had implicated herself. This was her only remaining conviction, and the appeal was enabled by a reform to the code of criminal procedure made in 2022. On 13 October 2023, the Court of Cassation ordered a retrial of this matter.

In June 2024, an Italian appellate court upheld Amanda Knox's slander conviction for falsely accusing Patrick Lumumba of murdering Meredith Kercher in 2007. She was not sentenced to additional prison time, as her original three-year slander sentence had already been covered by the nearly four years she spent in detention following her wrongful imprisonment for Kercher's murder.

== Personal and professional life ==
After returning to the United States in late 2011, Knox completed her degree and worked on a book about her case. She was often followed by paparazzi. Her family incurred large debts from the years of supporting her in Italy and were left insolvent, the proceeds from Waiting to Be Heard: A Memoir having gone to pay legal fees to her Italian lawyers. Knox has been a reviewer and journalist for what then was West Seattle Herald (later subsumed into Westside Seattle), and attended events of the Innocence Project and related organizations.

In a 2017 interview, Knox said she was devoting herself to writing and activism for the wrongfully accused. She hosted The Scarlet Letter Reports on Facebook Watch, a series which examined the "gendered nature of public shaming". Knox has also hosted other podcasts, including The Truth About True Crime and Labyrinths. She has been a featured speaker at fundraising events for non-profits, including the Innocence Project. In June 2019, Knox returned to Italy as a keynote speaker at a conference on criminal justice, where she was part of a panel titled "Trial by Media".

Meredith Kercher's family said through their lawyer that they have "not been pleased with the initiatives Amanda Knox has undertaken over the years" and accused her of attempting to profit from Kercher's murder with her public activities.

On February 29, 2020, Knox married author Christopher Robinson, who is connected to the Robinson Newspapers, owner of the Westside Seattle newspaper. They had first met after Knox's return to Seattle in 2011, and announced their engagement in 2019. In an October 2021 interview with The New York Times, Knox revealed that their first child, a daughter, had been born several months earlier. In September 2023, Knox gave birth to their second child, a son.

== Media ==
=== Books ===
- Burleigh, Nina (2011). The Fatal Gift of Beauty: The Trials of Amanda Knox. New York: Broadway Books. ISBN 978-0-307-58860-9.
- Kercher, John (2012). Meredith: Our Daughter's Murder and the Heartbreaking Quest for the Truth. London: Hodder & Stoughton. ISBN 978-1-4447-4276-3.
- Knox, Amanda (2013). Waiting to Be Heard: A Memoir. New York: Harper. ISBN 978-0-06-221722-6.
- Knox, Amanda (2025). Free: My Search for Meaning. New York: Grand Central Publishing. ISBN 9781538770719.
- Sollecito, Raffaele; Gumbel, Andrew (2012). Honor Bound: My Journey to Hell and Back with Amanda Knox. New York: Gallery Books. ISBN 978-1-5387-7071-9.

=== Documentaries ===
- Joe Halderman (Producer); Douglas Longhini (Producer); Chris Young (Producer) (April 10, 2008). A Long Way From Home. CBS News. 48 Hours. A documentary broadcast in the United States
- Joe Halderman (Producer); Douglas Longhini (Producer) (April 11, 2009). American Girl, Italian Nightmare. CBS News. 48 Hours Mystery. A documentary broadcast in the United States
- "Amanda Knox: The untold story". CBS News. October 9, 2011.
- Sawyer, Diane (April 30, 2013). "Murder Mystery: Amanda Knox Speaks". 20/20. ABC News. Diane Sawyer was the first to interview Knox after she was freed.
- Amanda Knox, October 2016, a Netflix original documentary
- Mouth of the Wolf: Amanda Knox Returns to Italy. (January 2026). Broadcast on Hulu and distributed internationally by Disney+. Directed by Christopher Robinson (Knox’s husband)

=== Film ===
- Amanda Knox: Murder on Trial in Italy (2011), also known as The Amanda Knox Story, February 21, 2011, an American true crime television film that first aired on the Lifetime network.
- The Face of an Angel, a 2014 British psychological thriller directed by Michael Winterbottom and written by Paul Viragh. The film was inspired by the book Angel Face, drawn from crime coverage by Newsweek/Daily Beast writer Barbie Latza Nadeau. The film stars Kate Beckinsale, Daniel Brühl, and Cara Delevingne.
- Stillwater, a 2021 film based on Knox's story. Knox accused actor Matt Damon and director Tom McCarthy of ripping off her story without her consent at the expense of her reputation.

=== Television ===
- Law & Order: Special Victims Unit (December 3, 2020). "Remember Me in Quarantine". Episode 3 of Season 22 is loosely based on the murder of Meredith Kercher. The main female antagonist is branded as "Sexy Lexi" and "Lockdown Lexi", a play on "Foxy Knoxy" the nickname given to Amanda Knox by the press.
- In The Rookie, police officer Aaron Thorsen's backstory is loosely based on Knox.
- In 2024 Knox made a cameo appearance as herself in the first-season finale of romantic comedy TV series Laid.
- A television miniseries based on the story of her wrongful conviction and subsequent acquittal, called The Twisted Tale of Amanda Knox, premiered on Hulu on August 20, 2025.

== See also ==
- List of miscarriage of justice cases
