= Cesare Serviatti =

Executed Italian serial killer

- Born: 24 November 1880; Subiaco, Italy
- Died: 13 October 1933 (aged 52); Sarzana, Italy
- Cause of death: Execution by firing squad
- Other names: "The Landru of the Tiber" "The Italian Landru"
- Conviction: Murder (x3)
- Penalty: Death (Gorietti case); Life imprisonment x2 (others)

Details
- Victims: 3+
- Span of crimes: 1928–1932
- Country: Italy
- States: Liguria, Lazio
- Date apprehended: 9 December 1932

Cesare Serviatti (24 November 1880 – 13 October 1933), known as The Landru of the Tiber (Il Landru del Tevere, in Italian), was an Italian serial killer who killed at least three women he contacted through lonely hearts ads between 1928 and 1932. Convicted for these crimes, he was sentenced to death and subsequently executed.

== Biography ==
Cesare Serviatti was born on 24 November 1880, in Subiaco, the only child of peasant parents who died when he was young. As a result, Serviatti was raised by another family in the countryside, where he was alleged to have killed animals for personal enjoyment and claimed that he wanted to become an executioner when he grew up. Despite his lack of education and violent tendencies, he was temporarily employed as a nurse at a polyclinic in Rome, from where he was eventually expelled for mistreating patients. He then found himself a job as a butcher, married to Angela Taborri and had a son, Giuseppe. The family lived off his meagre salary at Principe Amedeo 168 in Rome, near the Termini railway station.

== Murders ==
In July 1928, Serviatti began corresponding with 42-year-old Pasqua Bartolini Tiraboschi from Chiavari, a former opera singer who was left a hefty inheritance by her late husband. He managed to convince the woman to move to La Spezia, promising that they would be married there. After maintaining a relationship with her for some time, he then strangled her during sex and stole all valuables that his late lover had on herself. After that, Serviatti dismembered Tiraboschi's body into tiny pieces which he dumped into the building's cesspit. As her disappearance had gone unnoticed, Serviatti quietly returned to his wife without incident, deciding that this method would help satisfy both his financial and sexual desires.

In the summer of 1930, Serviatti started posting ads in the lonely hearts section of Il Messaggero, describing himself as a retired war veteran earning 450 lire a month and searching for a wealthy madam, preferably working as a maid, for marriage purposes. The first to respond to his ad was a young maid named Beatrice "Bice" Margarucci, who had just returned overseas from the United States. Serviatti convinced her to move in with him in Rome's Esquilino rione. In early November, he strangled Margarucci during sex and then dismembered her corpse, stuffing the remains into a suitcase which he then dumped from the Garibaldi Bridge into the Tiber. The suitcase was later found on November 3 on the shores between Santa Marinella and Ostia.

In the summer of 1932, Serviatti posted a similar ad in Il Messaggero, this time presenting himself as a retired marshal. This attracted the attention of 40-year-old Paolina Gorietti, a former maid for a wealthy family in Rome who now worked as a waitress in her native Naples. Starstruck by her prospective husband's promises of a wedding, family and opening of a small shop in La Spezia, Gorietti excitedly informed her colleague Olga Melgradi about her plans before leaving for the city. She arrived in early November 1932, but ceased all contact with her friend only days later.

== Arrest ==
On the morning of 16 November 1932, two expensive leather suitcases were left abandoned at the Napoli Centrale railway station after being left off a train coming from Torino Porta Nuova. Since the mysterious man who carried them wasn't identified, the suitcases were brought to lost property section of the station, where the employees began inspecting them. To their shock, when they opened the bigger suitcase, they found the torso of a woman, all wrapped up in old newspapers and covered in sawdust. On the next day, the other suitcase was opened, which was also found to contain remains corresponding to the same body. Determined to quickly solve the case, the Royal Carabinieri started investigating for any possible leads, but were left with dead ends and nothing pointing to the identities of either the victim or her killer.

When news of the mysterious corpse was posted in the local newspapers, investigators were contacted by Olga Melgradi and Gorietti's brothers, who claimed that the deceased woman was her friend and sister, Paolina, who had disappeared not too long ago after alleging that she was going to marry a man living in Rome. She then presented a letter sent to Gorietti from the man in question, who had signed it at the end with his real name: Cesare Serviatti.

On 9 December 1932, Serviatti was apprehended by authorities while having dinner with his wife at their apartment. His wife and son were also taken in for questioning, as there were suspicions that they had helped cover up the crimes, but were both later released due to lack of evidence. As for Serviatti, he initially solely admitted to bringing Gorietti to the city, but claimed he had nothing to do with her murder. After a few days of interrogations, he finally admitted his guilt, claiming that he had killed and then dismembered Gorietti's body and thrown the remains which he couldn't stuff into the suitcases into the canals. To the shock of the investigators, he also revealed that he was responsible for killing several other women, whom he refused to name or give any details. Due to the similarities in the murders, Serviatti was linked to the murders of Tiraboschi and Margarucci, despite the fact that he vehemently denied killing the former. No other killings were ever linked back to him despite his claims.

His trial began in the district court of La Spezia on 14 June 1933, and in the end, Serviatti would be convicted of his three known murders and robbing 2,000 lire in cash from Gorietti. On 8 July, he was sentenced to death for the Gorietti killing, while he was given two life terms for those of Tiraboschi and Margarucci, all of which were upheld by the Supreme Court of Casssation. Serviatti then pleaded for a pardon from King Victor Emmanuel III, who ignored his requests. As such, on 13 October 1933, Cesare Serviatti was brought out of prison and executed by firing squad in Sarzana.

== See also ==
- Henri Désiré Landru
- List of serial killers by country

== Bibliography ==
- Storia Illustrata n. 244, March 1978, Arnoldo Mondadori Editore (in Italian)
- Massimo Centini and Andrea Accorsi (31 October 2013). The great Italian crimes, solved or unresolved (in Italian). Newton Compton Editori.
- Emanuela Profumo (11 September 2008). Criminal Liguria (in Italian). Newton Compton Editori. ISBN 978-8854112391.
- Michael Newton (1 March 2006). The Encyclopedia of Serial Killers. Checkmark Books. ISBN 0816061963.
- Flaminia Savelli (12 July 2012). Mysteries, crimes and unsolved crimes of Rome. The dark side of the capital between murders, robberies, fights and usury (in Italian). Newton Compton Editori. ISBN 978-8854135901.
