= Greg Hampikian =

Armenian biologist

Greg Hampikian is an American biologist and the founder and director of the Idaho Innocence Project. He is considered one of the foremost forensic DNA experts in the United States.

Hampikian assisted in the establishment of various forensic evidence projects such as the Georgia Innocence Project, the Irish Innocence Project, and the Innocence Project France. He is currently a professor in the Departments of Biological Sciences and Criminal Justice at Boise State University. Hampikian is a DNA Expert on the Georgia Innocence Project Board. Hampikian is a New York Times contributing columnist whose two most popular contributions to date have been "Men, Who Needs Them" and "When May I Shoot a Student". Hampikian has published in numerous scholarly scientific journals, including Nature and the Proceedings of the National Academy of Sciences. Hampikian was inducted as a Charter Fellow of the National Academy of Inventors. His inventions range from a magnetic shaped memory alloy micro-pump to a forensic DNA labeling kit that prevents contamination of samples given to the police. Hampikian pioneered the study of DNA and protein sequences absent from nature and coined the term Nullomers. Hampikian lectures on DNA science generally as well as DNA in forensic evidence specifically nationwide. Hampikian is noted for his work on several exonerations both nationally and internationally including his work on the Amanda Knox case.

== Life and work ==
Hampikian received a master's degree and a PhD from the University of Connecticut in 1986 and 1990, respectively. He has worked with many attorneys on cases which involved DNA forensics investigation. He established the Idaho Innocence Project which analyzes wrongful conviction claims and assists those who have been falsely charged.

Hampikian is a contributor to scientific journals, newspapers and magazines; including a farcical look at the issue of allowing concealed weapons on college campuses. He has been featured on television numerous times in news networks such as CNN and BBC. He is also the co-author of the "Exit to Freedom" which documents the life of Calvin C. Johnson Jr., who was wrongfully convicted and spent seventeen years in prison.

Hampikian is also an amateur folk singer and songwriter.

== Amanda Knox ==
During the high-profile case of Amanda Knox, on May 23, 2011, Hampikian announced that, based on its independent investigation and review, DNA samples taken at the crime scene all pointed to African drifter Rudy Guede and excluded Knox and Sollecito. Upon reexamination of the DNA, he concluded that the evidence is unreliable and contaminated. Hampikian's work contributed to Knox and Sollecito's convictions being overturned.
