= Capital punishment in Italy =

Capital punishment

Europe holds the greatest concentration of abolitionist states (blue). Map current as of 2022 Abolished for all offences Abolished in practice Retains capital punishment

The use of capital punishment in peacetime in Italy has been banned since 1889, with the exception of the period 1926–1947, encompassing the rule of Fascism in Italy under Benito Mussolini (who was himself ultimately summarily executed) and the early restoration of democracy. Before the unification of Italy in 1860, capital punishment was performed in almost all pre-unitarian states, except for Tuscany, where, starting from 1786, it was repeatedly abolished (most recently in 1859) and reintroduced. It is currently prohibited by the Constitution of the Italian Republic with no more exceptions even in times of war.

== History ==
In Italy, the first pre-unitarian state to abolish the death penalty was the Grand Duchy of Tuscany as of 30 November 1786, under the reign of Pietro Leopoldo (soon to become Leopold II, Holy Roman Emperor) following about fourteen years of de facto moratorium. So Tuscany was the first modern state in the world to formally ban torture and capital punishment.

However, the death penalty was almost immediately reintroduced in 1790, due to the turmoil that accompanied Pietro Leopoldo's departure for Vienna. In 1831 a new moratorium on executions was proclaimed. With a law dated 11 October 1847, in the context of the reversion of the Duchy of Lucca to Tuscany, Grand Duke Leopold II, Pietro Leopoldo's grandson, abolished the death penalty in his new duchy, which therefore became the only abolitionist territory until February 1848, when the supreme court of Florence promptly extended the measure to the entire territory of the Grand Duchy.

This time too, however, the abolition was short-lived, and in 1852 capital punishment was restored again, only to be reabolished for the third time in 1859 by the Provisional Government that took office following the expulsion of the House of Habsburg-Lorraine. In the whole period from the post-Napoleonic restoration to 1859 there were only two capital executions in the Grand Duchy, in 1820 and 1830, and a third case, in 1854, could not be carried out due to practical impossibility (there was no longer an appointed headsman on duty, the guillotine had been thrown into the Arno in 1848, there was no personnel willing to be involved), and the Grand Duke had no choice but to pardon the condemned man, despite his being convicted of "a most enormous crime".

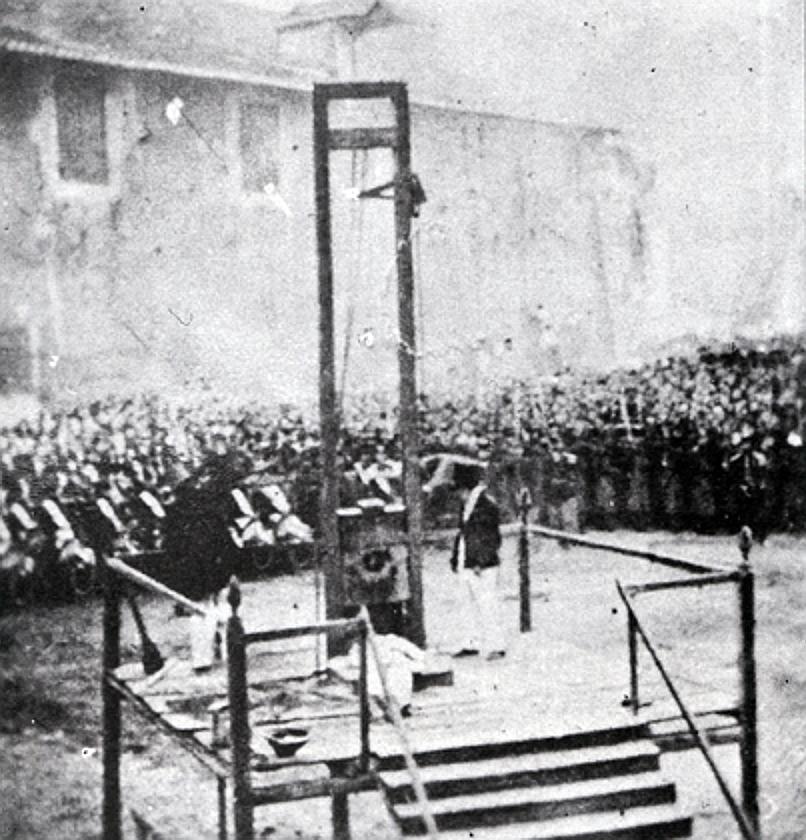
Execution of capital punishment by guillotine in 1868, when Rome was still part of the Papal States. The death penalty was subsequently abolished in 1889 and only revived under Italian Fascism.

Capital punishment was sanctioned in the codes of law of all pre-unitarian states except Tuscany, therefore after the proclamation of the Kingdom of Italy in 1860, legislation was divided: the penal code of the former Kingdom of Sardinia, which contemplated the death penalty, was extended to all of Italy except for Tuscany. Public opinion there abhorred its new reintroduction and vociferously opposed it, succeeding in having the pre-existing abolitionist regime maintained in force, limited to the territory of the former Grand Duchy.

Some thirty years later, capital punishment was definitively abolished nationwide in the 1889 Penal Code with the almost unanimous approval of both Houses of Parliament under suggestion of Minister Giuseppe Zanardelli. However executions in Italy had not been carried out since 1877, when King Umberto I granted a general pardon (royal decree of pardon of 18 January 1878). Ironically, as a result of this pardon and the enactment of the Zanardelli Code, Gaetano Bresci could not be sentenced to death after he assassinated Umberto I in 1900. The death penalty was still present in military and colonial penal codes, being massively applied during the First World War (1915-1918) for acts of desertion, insubordination and "dishonorable behavior", even against innocent soldiers (practice of decimation ordered by the generals without any decision of the military court).

In 1926, it was reintroduced by the Fascist regime to punish those who made an attempt on the king, the queen, the heir apparent or the Prime Minister as well as for espionage and armed rebellion. The Rocco Code (1930, in force from 1 July 1931) added more crimes to the list of those punishable with the death penalty, and reintroduced capital punishment for some common crimes. It was used sparsely, however; until the outbreak of war in 1940, a total of nine executions were carried out, allegedly not for political offenses, followed by another 17 until Italy's surrender in July 1943 (compared to almost 80,000 legal executions in Nazi Germany, including courts martial).

The last people executed for civil crimes were three Sicilian robbers, also convicted of murder, who battered and threw into a well ten people (while still alive) on a farm near Villarbasse (province of Turin) in 1945. The president, Enrico de Nicola, declined to pardon the three convicts, and they were executed by a firing squad on 4 March 1947, at Basse di Stura riverside, in the suburbs of Turin. This was the last execution in Italy for common crimes, while the next day there was the last execution for war crimes (against members of the National Republican Guard).

The Italian Constitution, signed on 27 December 1947, and in force since 1 January 1948, completely abolished the death penalty for all military and civil crimes during peacetime. This measure was implemented by the legislative decree 22/48 of 22 January 1948 (provision of coordination as a consequence of the abolishment of capital punishment). Thus, the death penalty remained in force in Italy in cases covered by the military penal code for wartime (though no execution ever took place) until law 589/94 of 13 October 1994 abolished it completely from there as well, and substituted it with the maximum penalty of the civil penal code (imprisonment for life). Prior to abolition, the death penalty was sanctioned in article 21 of the Italian penal code. It stated that "Death penalty is to be carried out by shooting inside a penitentiary or in any other place suggested by the Ministry of Justice. The execution is not public, unless the Ministry of Justice determines otherwise."

In 2007, notwithstanding that capital punishment was no longer provided for any case, a constitutional amendment was adopted, and article 27 of Italian Constitution was changed to ban for good from the Italian legal system even any abstract possibility of legitimate reintroduction of the death penalty, including in times of war. The third paragraph of art. 27 now simply states: "The death penalty is not permitted", without any further specification, limitation or exception.

A draft law to ratify the 13th Protocol of the European Convention on Human Rights had been approved by the Senate on 9 October 2008 (it was approved earlier by the Chamber of Deputies on 24 September 2008). It was ratified on 3 March 2009.

== Public opinion ==
The President of Italy, Sergio Mattarella, reportedly declared in 2016 that "There will never be full justice in the world, as long as the killing of human beings will not be banned".

Italy proposed the UN moratorium on the death penalty, which urges states to establish a moratorium on executions with a view toward abolition and urged states around the world to approve it. The former Italian Foreign Minister Massimo D'Alema also stated that the next step was to work on abolishing the death penalty.

The 2008 European Values Study (EVS) found that only 42% of respondents in Italy said that the death penalty can never be justified, while 58% said it can always be justified.

A series of polls since 2010 found that support for the death penalty has been growing. from 25% in 2010, 35% in 2017 and In 2020, 43% of Italians expressed support for the death penalty. A February 2024 poll has found that 31% of Italians support the death penalty.

Whatever the polls, none of the political parties represented in the Italian parliament, not even the right-wing ones, propose the reintroduction of the death penalty, and generally shared support for international initiatives against it has remained constant since the last decade of the twentieth century. The 2007 law amending the Constitution, which made the pre-existing limited ban on capital punishment absolute, was passed with a majority of more than two-thirds of those entitled to vote.

== See also ==
- Cesare Beccaria

== Bibliography ==
- Pasquale Stanislao Mancini (1872). "Contro la pretesa necessità della conservazione della pena di morte in Italia". Primo Congresso Giuridico Italiano in Roma. Relazione sulla Tesi I.ª Abolizione della pena di morte e proposta di una scala penale (in Italian). Roma: Pallotta. pp. 1–102.
