= Libertà condizionata =

Article 176 of the Italian Criminal Code concerns libertà condizionata (English: conditional release, or parole.)

According to the provisions of Article 176, an incarcerated person becomes eligible for a grant of libertà condizionata if he or she satisfies at least the following conditions:

(1) The prisoner has spent more than thirty months in confinement, or in the case of someone subject to a life sentence, at least 26 years;

(2) The prisoner has served more than half of their sentence, or if the inmate has served another sentence for another crime in the past, he has served three-quarters of that sentence;

(3) The prisoner has less than five years remaining on a sentence between 7½ years and life.

Once eligible for consideration, a prisoner must also be certified, based on his conduct in prison, as unlikely to commit another crime; otherwise, libertà condizionata need not be granted.

In addition, the tribunale di sorveglianza (English: surveillance court) may impose conditions on the ex-convict's release. Typical conditions are that he must be at home during night-time hours or live in a certain municipality (Italian: comune) and not leave without explicit court permission.

If someone released under libertà condizionata commits a crime, he will be remanded to custody and serve the full term of the original sentence, in addition to any new penalty. Also, if he violates the conditions imposed by the tribunale di sorveglianza, he may be returned to prison. A person who behaves satisfactorily under libertà condizionata for a period of five years is considered to have paid his debt to society.

A person sentenced for a crime related to the mafia or terrorism is ineligible for libertà condizionata unless he cooperates with the authorities. This effectively means that the convicted person will spend the remainder of their life in prison, but some critics argue that it is hard to know what evidence might support the assertion that ties of this sort have, in fact, been broken. Becoming a pentito and giving substantial help to the authorities is generally considered to be sufficient evidence of a change of heart.

Of the approximately fifty thousand inmates in Italian prisons, only twenty-one were granted libertà condizionata in 2006. It is much more common to be allowed to work outside the prison during the day (semilibertà, i.e. semi-freedom).
