= Villarbasse =

- Comune
- Comune di Villarbasse
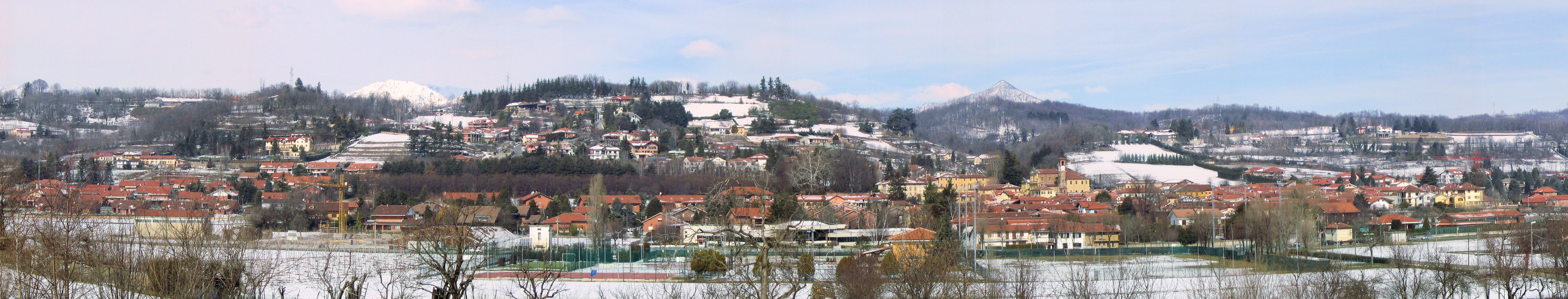

- Location within Italy Location within Piedmont
- Coordinates: 45°3′N 7°28′E
- Country: Italy
- Region: Piedmont
- Metropolitan city: Turin (TO)

Government
  - Mayor: Eugenio Aghemo

Area
  - Total: 10.4 km^{2} (4.0 sq mi)
- Elevation: 381 m (1,250 ft)

Population (31 December 2010)
  - Total: 3,334
  - Density: 321/km^{2} (830/sq mi)
- Demonym: Villarbassesi
- Time zone: UTC+1 (CET)
  - Summer (DST): UTC+2 (CEST)
- Postal code: 10090
- Dialing code: 011
- Website: Official website

Villarbasse is a comune (municipality) in the Metropolitan City of Turin in the Italian region Piedmont, located about 20 kilometres (12 mi) west of Turin.

Villarbasse borders the following municipalities: Rivoli, Rosta, Reano, Rivalta di Torino, and Sangano.

It was the seat of the last application of capital punishment in Italy on March 4, 1947, following the Villarbasse massacre.

== The territory of the Municipality of Villarbasse ==
The territory of the Municipality of Villarbasse occupies a predominantly hilly area characterized by slightly inclined slopes that delineate flat areas of narrow and elongated shape. This is an area entirely enclosed in the morainic hills of Rivoli-Avigliana. The only permanent waterway is the Sangone stream which, to the south, marks the boundary with Sangano and Bruino. While to the north a series of ridges mark the territory with Rosta. To the west is the border with Reano while to the east are found Rivalta and Rivoli.

== History and place name ==
The name Villarbasse (until the 19th century Villar di Basse or in Latin Villaro Bassiorum) is composed of Villar, indicating in Piedmont and in the Occitan area a sparse settlement and the determinative Basse, indicating in northern Italy, topographically depressed areas, often with stagnation of water. [Gianmario Raimondi – La toponomastica – Elementi di metodo. Stampatori, 2003.]

The nucleus of the town is divided into Palassoglio (“Little Palace”, under the jurisdiction of the commendatory abbots of San Solutore) and Carré (“Quadrated”, under the jurisdiction of the lay feudatories). The hamlets of Corbiglia (Curtis Vetula, “Old Manor”) and Roncaglia were once indicated as "Villar di Mezzo" (Halfway Hamlets).

The first traces of human presence are the Neolithic incisions on the erratic boulders.

Some excavations carried out during the nineteenth century, especially around Borgata Corbiglia, brought to light tombstones, weapons, vases and furnishings dating back to Roman times. Another possible settlement (near the church of San Martino) has left traces in the tombstone now visible on the facade of the Town Hall. At the time of foundation (1006) of the Abbey of San Solutore, some estates, included in the present territory of Villarbasse, are listed among the assets received as a donation by Gezone, bishop of Turin. Corbiglia, instead, was a possession of the Abbey of San Michele (Sacra).

In 1250Villarbasse became a municipality, with interests distinct from those of the Abbey of San Solutore.

Far from the main roads of communication, the town was not subjected to major military events: but there is evidence of fires and looting by the French and Spanish, especially in the seventeenth century. In the following centuries Villarbasse, due to its pleasant and easy to reach position, was often chosen as a holiday residence by the noble families of Turin serving the House of Savoy.

The water system of the town is very old: the three public lavatories of medieval origin, called "Corni" (Horns) in which the waters of the Val Lesana flow, are also characteristic.

== The hamlets ==
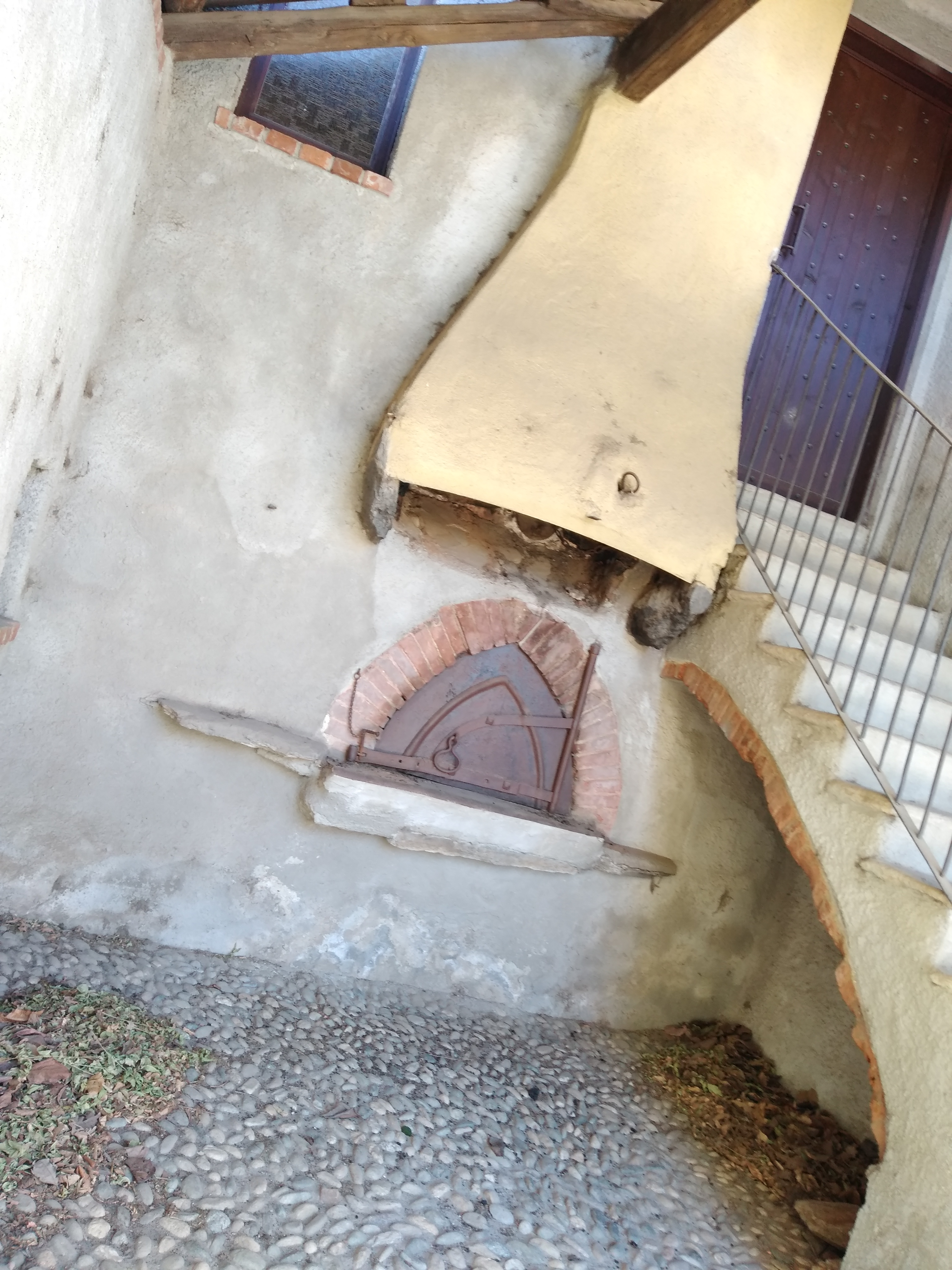
Roncaglia

Borgata Corbiglia (aggregated in 1956 from Rosta)

The former Curtis Vetula, probably represents the oldest settlement in the territory. In the nineteenth century, following a redevelopment, stretches of walls, coins of Caesar Augustus and Antoninus Pius, who died in 161 AD (one of which in silver), tombs (as many as 17 - partly in rough stone, partly in masonry containing urns, lamps, etc.), weapons and many other objects were found.

Borgata Roncaglia (aggregated in 1890 from Rivalta) preserves the very tiny, historical elementary school and the well with adjacent oven. A ladder allows access to a room above the oven that was given to the poorest family of the hamlet so that in winter they could stay warm for free.

== Historical buildings ==
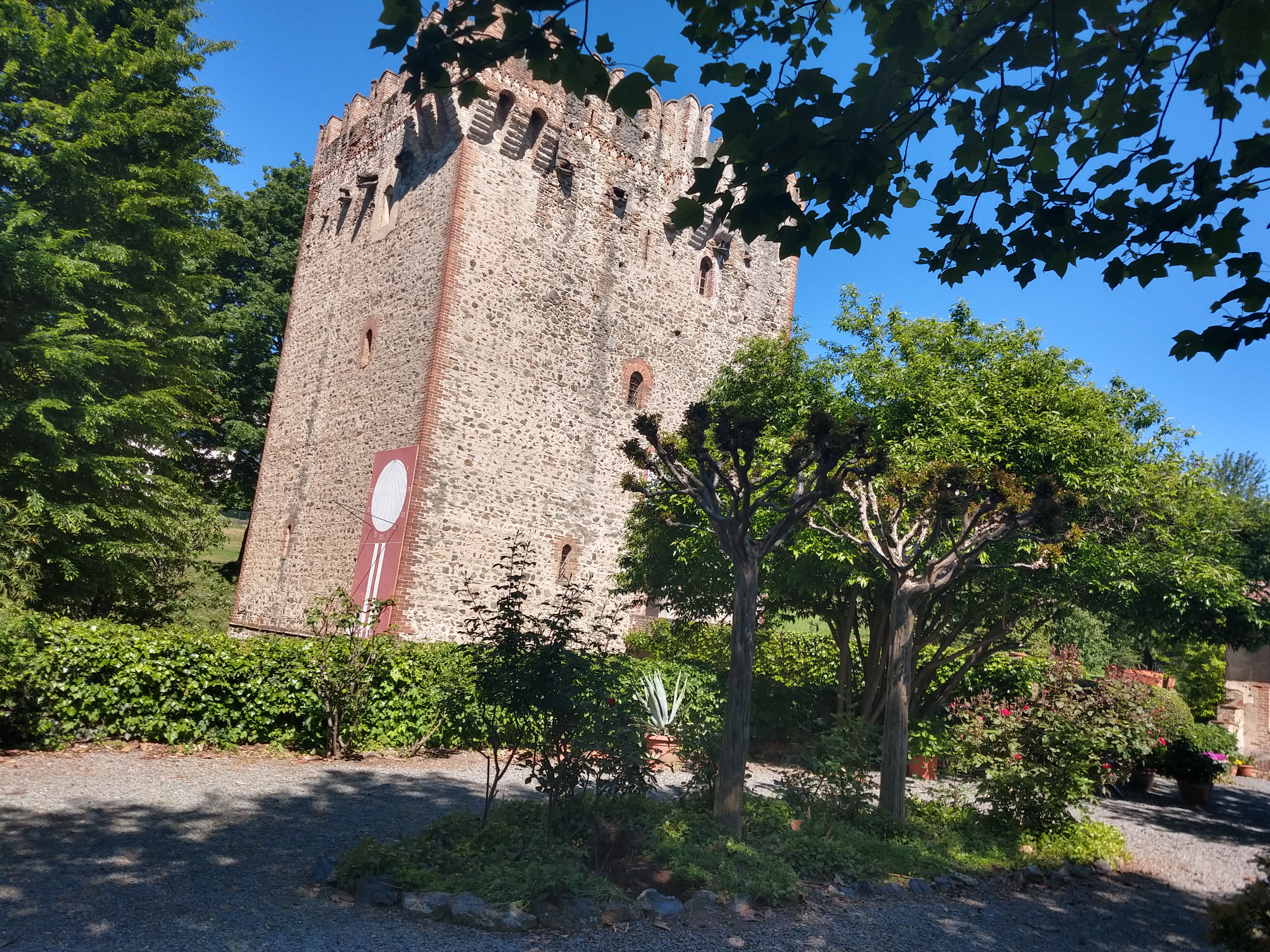
Torrazzo (The Old Tower)

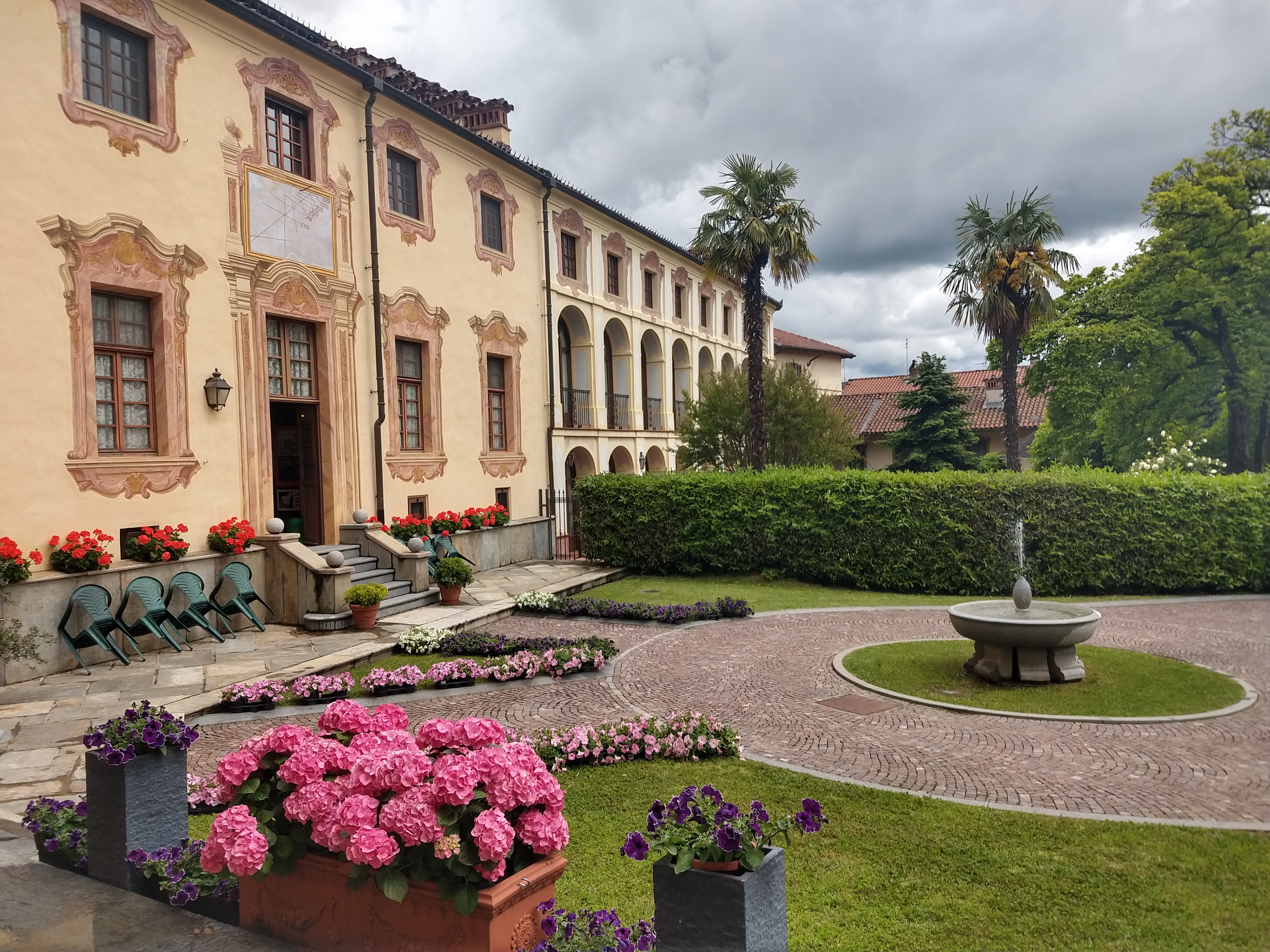
Cucca Mistrot Palace

=== Torrazzo (The Old Tower) ===
13th century fortified building, symbol of the town, once surrounded by a wide moat.

Around 1430, Amedeo di Chignin, Lord of Villarbasse, was invested with the “Palazzo Antico” (The Old Palace, that is the Torrazzo) with its adjacent properties and, in the years 1434 ÷ 1436, built the more comfortable Palazzo Nuovo (The New Palace), using the bastion to the east that delimited the square of village between the moat and the bastion itself, nowadays a private garden. The Old Tower gained popularity in 1884 when the authoritative local scholar Ferdinando Rondolino, described it in the novel "The Court of Achaia".

=== Cucca Mistrot Palace ===
The current structure probably dates back to the seventeenth century on the site of the residence of the commendatory of the Abbey of San Solutore (hence the name of Palazzuolo, “Little Palace”). The pictorial decoration with illusory architecture is characteristic. In the middle of the nineteenth century the 'south wing’ was added as silkworm breed farm.

=== Schiari-Riccardi Palace ===
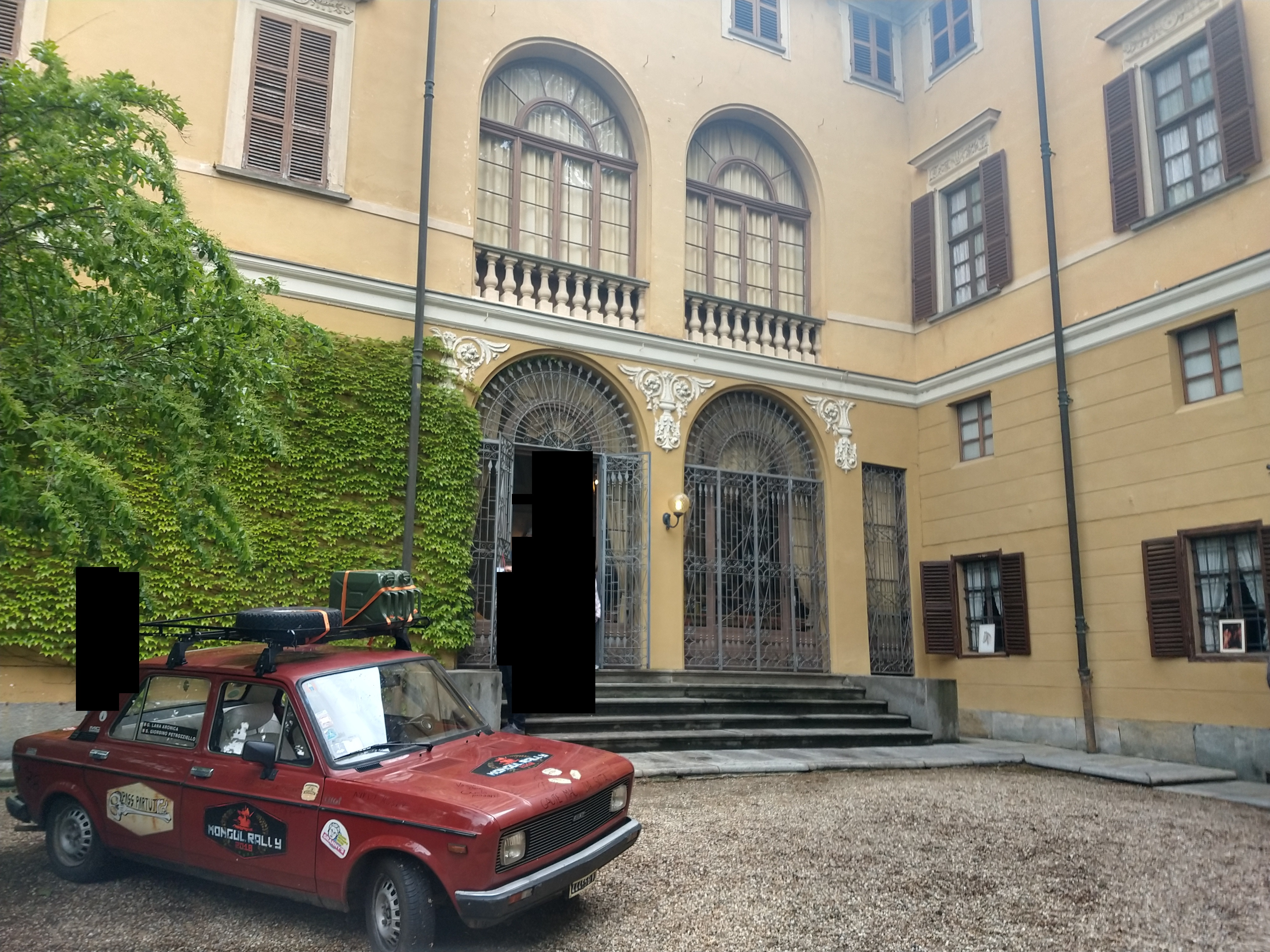
Schiari-Riccardi Palace courtyard

Its history started with the purchase of the site, in the last twenty years of the seventeenth century, by the Count of Villarbasse Carlo Bartolomeo Rolando, who chose it because it was located in an eminent place and close to the recently restored parish. A decade of work radically changed its appearance from the pre-existing stronghold.

On the death of the owner (1700) the young and energetic daughter Angela Vittoria Francesca inherited the estate, and in 1709 married Pietro Eugenio Reminiac d'Angennes, a Breton at the service of the Duke of Savoy, and recently created a count for acquired merits. After the death of the gentlewoman, the three-storey building passed to him, still devoid of the added wing that will give it an L-shaped plan. To Carlo Luigi d’Angennes we owe the origin of the famous Teatro d'Angennes in Turin (a wooden structure built after the fire of Carignano Theatre).

In 1821 Carlo Eugenio II had the palace of Villarbasse rebuilt and entrusted the architect Pregliasco, set designer to the Teatro Regio and the Scala the masonry construction of the theater of Turin.

=== Gonella Palace ===
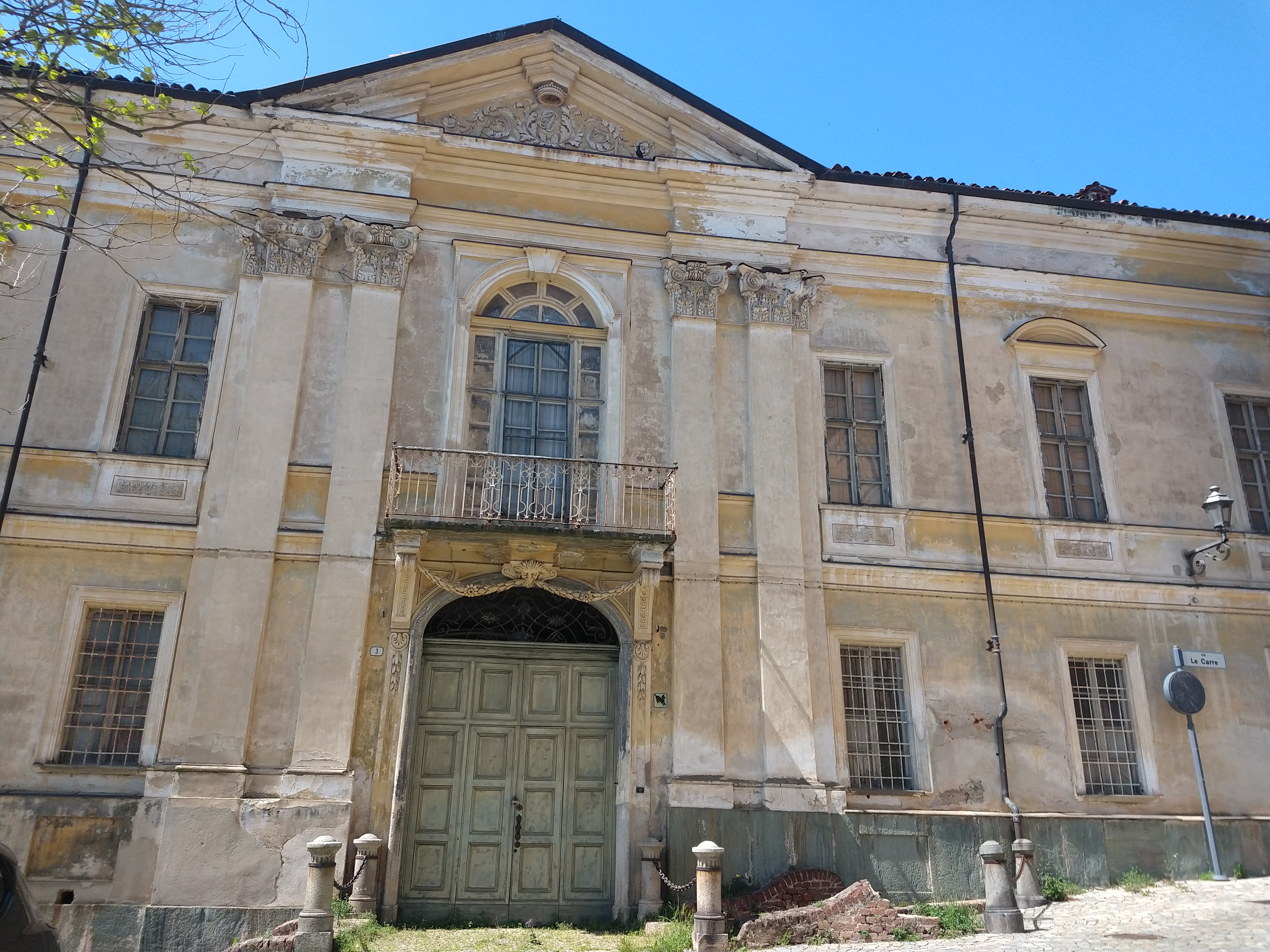
Gonella Palace

Its story is very lacking in testimony. It was built in the 1820s, in chronological concomitance with the palace of the d'Angennes. In the south-west corner the chapel is still preserved, to the west there is a large park bordered by a fence that follows the route of the Strada Comba Bona.

=== Casa Brayda ===
Following Via Primo Maggio (formerly Via Maestra “Main Road”) to Via Brayda (formerly Strada di Rivalta) we reach the beautiful residence of two famous scholars: Riccardo (1849–1911) and Carlo Brayda (1903–78, engineer, remembered for the excavation of the castle of the abbey of Sangano). In the eighteenth century to the house was annexed a spinning mill, at the time the most important factory of the town. After years of success the company was forced to give in to competition and in 1840 to close. The great “bigattiera” for breeding silkworms however survived until 1870, and was then transformed in the nineteenth century as a wing of the home.

== Religious buildings ==
=== San Nazzario Church ===
A plaque walled into the first pillar on the left upon entering indicates that the church, built in the 12th century, partially renovated in 1674 and rededicated in 1777, had its façade rebuilt in 1830 and, in 1873, the apse area reworked and enlarged with the addition of the chapel of the Sacred Heart. In a few lines a long history is thus traced, whose antiquity is certified by the Romanesque stone bell tower, divided into single and double lancet windows and elevated in 1729–30 to bring the sound of the bells to the hilly area that was gradually being populated.

=== Saint Quirico Church ===
Its foundation dates back to the 12th century, but only parts of the perimeter walls and the bell tower remain of the original construction. In the walls Roman tiles of recovery are inserted.

=== Saint Bernardo Church ===
18th century chapel of the Roncaglia village.

=== Saint Martin Church ===
Located at the intersection of the roads that connect Villarbasse to Reano and Sangano, first documented in 1348. In 1887 the pre-existence of an ancient Roman tomb was confirmed. The tombstoneis nowexposed at the Town Hall.

=== Saint Rocco Church ===
Chapel built from 1577 on the road to Rivoli. San Rocco is the protector against the plague (in 1576 there was a violent epidemic in Northern Italy). Built on the edge of the town, it could also serve as a roadblock.

Chapel of the Simonetto farm house (Site of the episode known as the "Villarbasse massacre")

The Chapel dates back to 1721 and it is dedicated to the Black Madonna of Oropa.

=== Church of the Holy Spirit ===
Early eighteenth century, it was home of the same name Brotherhood.

=== Chapel of Santa Maria del Bosco ===
Chapel attached to the Cucca – Mistrot palace, on Via della Fonte.

== Glacial geomorphology ==
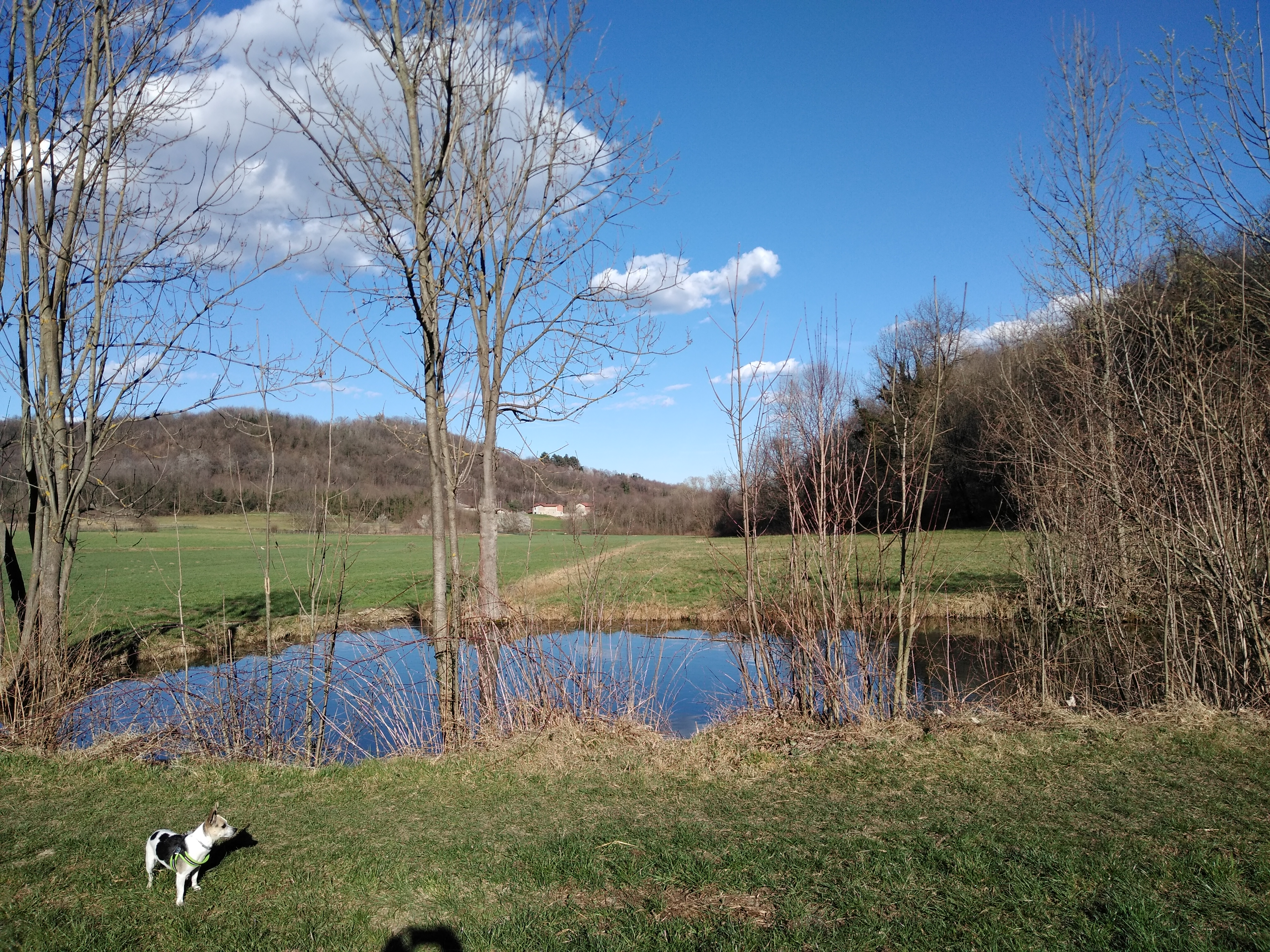
Val Lesiana

The Rivoli-Avigliana Morainic Amphitheatre is a complex sedimentary succession composed by glacigenic deposits related with several expansions of the Dora Riparia glacier. The age of the preserved ridges span from Middle Pleistocene to the Last Glacial Maximum.

In Villarbasse we can observe three ridges: the more external and therefore the older one (Truc Monsagnasco, Truc Bandiera), composed of diamicton [https://en.wikipedia.org/wiki/Diamicton] with angular to subangular clasts and boulders (ablation until), an intermediate one (Tolaj, Vigne, Truc Carlevé, Simonetto, Baronis ridges) – (between the two the gap of the glacial spill-way of Basse, covered by lacustrine deposit), and the upper Pleistocene ridge (Pian Topie – Cresta Grande). More recent lacustrine deposits can be found in Val Lesiana – Ca’ di Paglia intermorainic basin.

[ARPA – Carta Geologica d’Italia-foglio 155 Torino Ovest, 2009]

The ridges are cut by perpendicular overflow channels which drain the spill-way valleys and form little alluvial fans (both Villarbasse and Corbiglia are built upon these deposits).

The Prato Perosino (Basse) spill-way is a well preserved fluvioglacial form [I Geositi nel paesaggio alpino della Provincia di Torino, Provincia di Torino, 2004]

During every glacial pulsation, the material carried down by the Glacier is deposited at the end of the valley. Later on, erosion agents will remove part of the material and only the biggest blocks of rocks will be left behind: The Erratic Boulders.

=== The erratic boulders ===
The landscape of Villarbasse is characterized by erratic boulders; large rocky blocks immersed or resting on finer sediments. Many of the rocks of Villarbasse show evident traces of graffiti such as the Neolithic cupels. The most famous boulders are the following:

==== "Pera Majana" ====
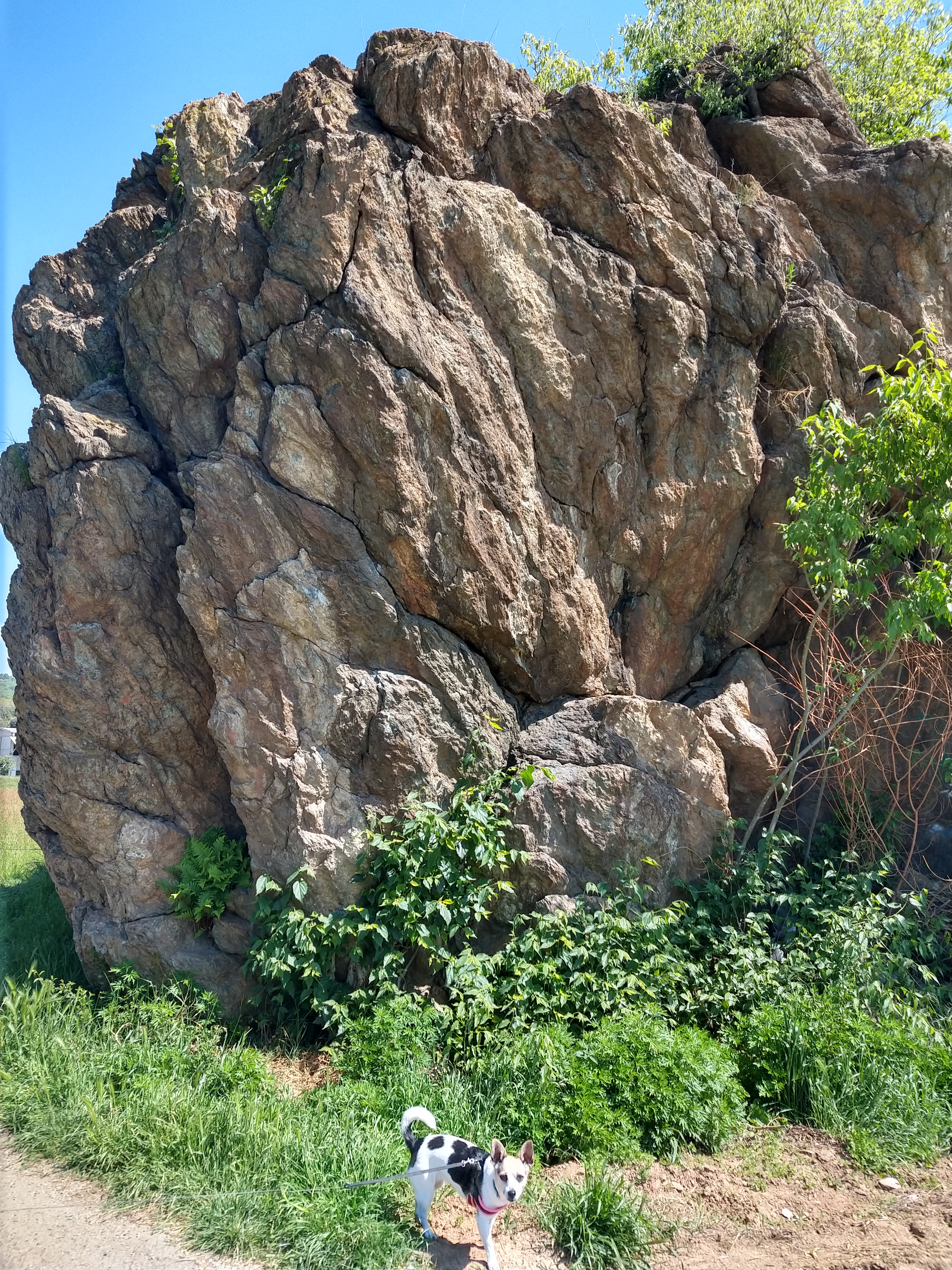
Pera Majana

Double boulder in serpentinite isolated among the meadows (c.1800 mc the largest) and visible from the ring road. On its west flank there is a plaque in memory (+ 1974) of Ugo Campagna, president of Pro Natura, testimonial of the campaigns in defense of the boulders, once considered convenient quarries of gravel.

==== "Roc ‘d le Sacoce" ====
(Rock of the Pockets) in the small valley of Basse, near the ruins of an old mill. Greenschist . The bowls or cupels that appear on the boulder are considered to be of natural origin. Other interesting boulders in the surroundings.

==== "Massi di Truc Monsagnasco" ====
Near the top of the Truc (Hill) it is possible to see six small rock blocks of a mica-schist-quartzose or greenschist composition that have numerous circular sockets on the surface, probably carved by Neolithic man. They are known to be the first compelled rocks discovered in Italy.

== Center of Experimental Archeology ==
The experimental Archaeological Park covers an area of approximately 4,000 square meters. on the morainic hill of Villarbasse, in the Barano area.

The center offers demonstrations on prehistoric technologies and activities.

Periodic demonstrations of stone chipping and sanding, bone processing and fire ignition. It is possible to see the cooking of food, weaving and spinning of fibers, the making of ceramic artifacts and casting of bronze.

== Twin towns and sister cities ==
Villarbasse is twinned with:

- Chignin, France
