= Italian Code of Criminal Procedure =

Rules governing procedure in court

The Italian Code of Criminal Procedure contains the rules governing criminal procedure in every court in Italy. The Italian legal order adopted four codes since the Italian Unification. After the first two codes, in 1865 and 1913, the Fascist Government established in 1930 a new code adopting an inquisitorial system. In 1988 the Italian Republic adopted a new code, that could be considered to be somewhere in between the inquisitorial system and the adversarial system.

Flow chart that represents the Italian criminal procedure.

== Parties ==
The main parties to a criminal trial are the judge, the defendant, and the prosecutor (the Pubblico Ministero). There are other parties that are optional, and they are: the Polizia Giudiziaria (Judiciary Police, a branch of the police whose duty is to help a prosecutor during his investigations), the parte lesa (the injured party), the responsabile civile (civilly liable, who can be compelled to pay damages, if the defendant is not solvent) and the civilmente obbligato per la pena pecuniaria (civilly liable, who can be compelled to pay the fines, if the defendant is not solvent).

=== Pubblico Ministero ===
The Pubblico Ministero (the public prosecutor) is the one who, during the preliminary investigations, must look for evidence. Since he is a member of the Judiciary (technically, a Magistrato - Magistrate, though not a Giudice - Judge), he must try to find out the truth; that's why he must not only look for evidence that can lead to a conviction, but also that which may lead to an acquittal.

== Preliminary investigations ==
When a Pubblico Ministero or a member of Polizia Giudiziaria becomes aware of the fact that a crime was committed, he must begin his investigation: in Italy, the public prosecutor has the duty to initiate criminal proceedings. The indagato (the person who is suspected to have committed the crime) can charge a lawyer to investigate on that person's behalf, in order to prove innocence. The Pubblico Ministero can appoint experts to carry out examinations; and, when the examination cannot be repeated (for instance, an autopsy), he must inform the indagato, so that he can appoint another expert, to ensure his right of defense. In the case of interrogations, of searches and of seizures, the indagato can ask that his lawyer be present.

== Judge for the preliminary investigations ==
During the preliminary investigations, a Judge only seldom intervenes. The Giudice per le Indagini Preliminari (Judge for the Preliminary Investigations) controls the actions of the Pubblico Ministero, when the personal rights of the indagato are at stake. No indagato can be wiretapped, unless the Judge for the Preliminary Investigations has authorised it. All measures must be adopted by the Judge with an order, and he must also publish written explanations of his decisions.

=== Precautionary measures ===
The precautionary measures, adopted during the preliminary investigations or afterwards, aim at preventing the defendant from fleeing, from committing another crime or from destroying true evidence or creating false evidence. They cannot be adopted unless there is proof that the defendant has committed a crime (fumus commissi delicti). The Judge competent to adopt these measures is either the Judge for the Preliminary Investigations, the Judge of the Preliminary Hearing or the Judge of the Trial, according to the phase of the proceeding they are in, when the Pubblico Ministero asks that the defendant's rights of movement be limited.

There are many kinds of precautionary measures:

Kind	Specification
Coercive measures	Prohibition to leave the country
Coercive measures	Duty to present oneself to the nearest police station on given days
Coercive measures	Expulsion from one's family house
Coercive measures	Restraining orders
Coercive measures	Prohibition or duty to dwell in a given place
Coercive measures	House arrest
Coercive measures	Provisional arrest
Interdictive measures
Interdictive measures	Suspension of parental authority
Interdictive measures	Suspension from a public office or service
Interdictive measures	Temporary interdiction from practising given professional or entrepreneurial activities
Real measures	Precautionary sequestrations

The defendant or the prosecutor can appeal against the order of the Judge before the Tribunale della Libertà (Court of Liberty). This court can uphold, modify or quash the Judge's order. Its decision can be appealed before the Corte di Cassazione (Court of Cassation).

The CL (Court of Liberty) actually reviews all the evidence and must render its decision within ten days from the appeal.

The Corte di Cassazione, on the contrary, cannot rule on merits, but only on correct procedure and correct interpretation of the law.

== Interrogations and self-incriminating statements ==
When a person who is neither an indagato (suspect) nor an imputato (defendant), interrogated by the police or the prosecutor, reveals pieces of information that might lead to his incrimination, the interrogation must be immediately stopped, the person must be invited to nominate a lawyer and be warned that the information disclosed may render necessary an investigation. These self-incriminating statements are inadmissible in court.

The police or the prosecutor summon the indagato, during the preliminary investigations, and inform him precisely of the actions he is alleged to have committed (not yet technically a charge); they also inform him of the evidence so far gathered against him, if this is not detrimental to the investigations; the indagato is also invited to defend himself, if he so wishes; the police or the prosecutor can also ask him questions, that he may refuse to answer.

The indagato, when interrogated, must be free of all undue influence, both psychological and physical. He must be willing to provide information (animus confitendi). The police or the prosecutor cannot use on the indagato any methods or techniques that may influence his right to self-determination or alter his memory or his capability to evaluate facts. This prohibition applies even if it was the indagato who asked that these methods or techniques be used. Before the interrogation begins, the indagato must be informed that his statements can be used against him in court; that he can choose not to answer the question, but that the investigations will proceed nonetheless; that, if he provides information concerning someone else's criminal responsibility, he will assume, as far as this responsibility is concerned, the office of witness.

If evidence should be gathered in violation of these principles, it would be inadmissible in court.

== Notice of closure ==
When the Prosecutor deems to have gathered enough information to make his case and before summoning the suspect before the Judge of the Preliminary Hearing, he must serve a notice to the suspect, in which the latter is informed of the crime he is alleged to have committed and that all the evidence gathered up to that moment can be examined by the suspect and by his attorney.

By this notice, the suspect is also informed that he can, within twenty days, file a defensive brief, present the results of the defensive inquiry, appear before the Prosecutor to make spontaneous statements or to ask the Prosecutor to question him; the suspect can also ask the Prosecutor to carry out specific acts of inquiry.

The Prosecutor may comply within thirty days; he must, however, question the suspect, if he so asks.

If the Prosecutor does not serve this notice, the decreto di rinvio al giudizio (indictment) is null and void.

== Preliminary hearing ==
When the preliminary investigations are over, if the Pubblico Ministero thinks that the evidence he gathered could not justify a conviction, he must archiviare the notitia criminis (he must drop the charges). If, on the contrary, he deems he can make his case, he summons the individual, whose status, because of this summons, now changes from that of "suspect" ("indagato") to that of "defendant" ("imputato"), to appear before the Judge of the Preliminary Hearing (JPH).

Before the JPH, the Pubblico Ministero presents all the evidence he has gathered so far; the defendant can make his case and try to prove his innocence. The JPH, if convinced of the defendant's innocence or that the evidence gathered would not be enough to justify a guilty verdict, passes a sentence of non luogo a procedere (no grounds to proceed).

Should new evidence be found, the Prosecutor may ask the Judge for the Preliminary Investigations (JPI) that this judgement be revoked. During the hearing, before the JPI, the defendant can be assisted by his lawyer. If the sentence is revoked, the Prosecutor must, once again, summon the defendant before the JPH.

If, on the contrary, the JPH thinks that the evidence gathered so far is enough to justify a guilty verdict, he issues a decreto (order or decree) of rinvio al giudizio (indictment).

All the evidence gathered so far is, then, expelled from the defendant's file, with the exception of those pieces of evidence that cannot be repeated, such as the initial autopsy or a search and seizure, or that were gathered in the defendant's presence and in that of his lawyer or his experts.

== Trial ==
During the dibattimento (trial), both the Prosecutor and the defendant try to make their case.

Article 111 of the Italian Constitution states that

2. Trials are based on equal confrontation of the parties before an independent and impartial judge. The law has to define reasonable time limits for the proceedings.

3. In criminal trials, the law provides for timely and confidential information of the accused regarding the nature and reasons of charges brought against them; they are granted the time and means for their defense; they have the right to question those who testify against them or to have them questioned; those who may testify in favor of the accused must be summoned and examined under the same conditions granted to the prosecution; any evidence in favor of the accused must be acknowledged; the accused may rely on the help of an interpreter if they do not understand or speak the language of the proceedings.

4. In criminal trials, evidence may only be established according to the principle of confrontation between parties. No defendant may be proven guilty on the basis of testimony given by witnesses who freely and purposely avoided cross-examination by the defense.

During the trial, all the witnesses must bear testimony once again, as must the experts. Plus, all the experiments, conducted during the preliminary investigations, must be repeated as possible and so on, to allow the defendant to actually participate in the process of formazione della prova (proof formation).

If the Giudice del Dibattimento (Judge of the Trial) is convinced beyond any reasonable doubts the defendant is guilty, the Judge must convict him; if not, the Judge must acquit. The Judge must also publish written explanations of his decisions.

=== Defendant ===
The defendant can be called to the stand, but he may refuse to bear testimony or he may refuse to answer some questions. He can also lie. Since he does not take an oath and since he is not technically a witness, if a defendant tells a lie, he is not committing perjury.

A defendant can also choose to make spontaneous statements to the Judge; he can tell whatever he wishes to tell and can choose not to answer any questions. In this case too, a defendant can lie without consequences.

=== Evidence ===
For a defendant to be convicted, the Judge must be internally convinced (Italian law requires the Judge's intimo convincimento); because of that, there are no rules that predetermine the weight to be attributed to any given piece of evidence, so even credible admissions [of guilt] can do no more than reduce the amount of extrinsic evidence necessary for a finding of guilt.

Before the beginning of the trial phase, the parties file a brief, detailing all evidence they want to present – the parties have to indicate by name every witness and precisely what these will be asked –; both the defendant and the prosecutor can cross-examine each other's witnesses. The Judge may choose not to admit any testimony that appears patently superfluous, reject irrelevant or improper or irregular questions – such as leading questions – and also ask questions to the witnesses and experts.

The Judge can also, but only when absolutely necessary, order additional evidence to be taken.

== Judges of the trial ==
Italy does not try anyone by a jury of peers: everyone is judged by professional judges or by a panel of judges (three or five or nine). The only exception to the use of professional judges is in the Corte d'Assise, which is made up of eight judges: two are professional, six are lay (they are called Giudici Popolari or Popular Judges, where 'popular' means 'of the people'). All wear a sash in the national colours. They are not technically jurors, as the term is understood in Anglo-Saxon jurisprudence. In Italian, Giudice (Judge) refers both to the eight of them together as a collective body and to each of them considered separately as a member of that body.

Since Lay Judges are not jurors, they cannot be excused, unless there are grounds that would justify an objection to a Judge. Also, they are not sequestered, because a trial often lasts too long to restrict travel: an Italian trial, including the preliminary investigations, preliminary hearing, trial and appeals, can last several years. To keep a citizen — who continues to work, while serving as a Popular Judge — sequestered for years would be unfeasible.

Judge	Specification	Members of the Court	Cognizance	Sentence	Appeal
Justice of the peace		1 honorary (onorario) Judge	Petty offences, such as slander, libel or criminal threatening	Pecuniary penalty; House stay (permanenza domiciliare); Community service, but only if the defendant so asks	Tribunale monocratico
Tribunale	Monocratico	1 professional Judge	All crimes that are not within the cognizance of the Justice of the peace or of the Corte d'Assise	Pecuniary penalty — substituting a prison sentence; Up to ten years' imprisonment.	Court of Appeals
Tribunale	Collegiale	3 professional Judges	All crimes that are not within the cognizance of the Justice of the peace or of the Corte d'Assise	Up to thirty years' imprisonment.	Court of Appeals
Corte d'Assise		2 professional Judges; 6 popular (lay) Judges	Major felonies, such as murder, massacre, terrorism	Up to thirty years' imprisonment; life imprisonment.	Corte d'Assise d'Appello

== Appeals ==
Both the defendant and the prosecutor can appeal against the judgement before the Corte d'Appello (Court of Appeals), that will retry the defendant. The judgement passed by the Court of Appeals can be appealed, again, before the Court of Cassation, that cannot rule on merits. Both the Court of Appeals and the Court of Cassation must examine and rule on every appeal. They can uphold, modify or quash the sentence.

The prosecutor can appeal all judgements issued by the Court of first instance — this means that a not-guilty verdict can be appealed and overturned too -. The Court of Appeals can hand down a more serious penalty than the Court of instance.

Only when the defendant alone has appealed the judgement, the Court of Appeals cannot issue a more serious sentence.

=== Appellate Courts ===
Judge	Members of the Court	Cognizance	Appeal
Tribunale monocratico	1 Professional Judge	Appeals against judgements rendered by a Justice of the peace	Court of Cassation
Court of Appeals	3 Professional Judges	Appeals against judgements rendered by a Tribunale	Court of Cassation
Corte d'Assise d'Appello	2 Professional Judges; 6 Popular (lay) Judges	Appeals against judgements rendered by a Corte d'Assise	Court of Cassation

=== Cassation with remandment ===
The Court of Cassation cannot rule on the merits of a case, so, when quashing a verdict issued by a lower Court, it is possible that the members of the Court realize that further fact-finding is required to reach a final judgement.
In these cases, the Court quashes the previous judgement, but it remands the case to another criminal division of the Appellate Court that issued the appealed decision or, if it is not possible, to a criminal division of the nearest Appellate Court.
The Judge ad quem (the one the case is remanded to) can try de novo the defendant, but must conform to the contingent points of law applied by the Court of Cassation. The verdict issued by the Judge ad quem is appealable before the Court of Cassation.

== Verdicts ==
The following are the only verdicts that a Judge can pass at the end of a trial.

Verdict		Specification	Meaning
Guilty (colpevole)	Conviction (condanna)		The defendant is found guilty and is, thereby, sentenced by the Judge
Not guilty (non colpevole)	Acquittal (assoluzione)	Perché il fatto non sussiste ("because the action does not exist")	Because the action allegedly committed by the defendant never took place
Not guilty (non colpevole)	Acquittal (assoluzione)	Perché l'imputato non lo ha commesso ("because the accused did not commit it")	Because the action allegedly committed by the defendant was actually committed by another party
Not guilty (non colpevole)	Acquittal (assoluzione)	Perché il fatto non costituisce reato ("because the action does not constitute an offence")	Because the action was committed by the defendant, but is not considered a crime, for he was justified (e.g. self defense)
Not guilty (non colpevole)	Acquittal (assoluzione)	Perché il fatto non è previsto dalla Legge come reato ("because the action is not included by the Law as an offence")	Because the action was committed by the defendant, but is no longer considered to be a crime by the law
Not guilty (non colpevole)	Acquittal (assoluzione)	Perché l'imputato non è punibile ("because the accused is not punishable")	Because the action was committed by the defendant, but the defendant is not punishable for some reason, such as being legally insane or other reasons.
Not guilty (non colpevole)	Non doversi procedere ("one must not proceed")		There is a cause that prevents the Judge from actually deciding whether the defendant was guilty (e.g. an amnesty has been passed, the statute of limitations has expired, the injured party did not submit a criminal complaint etc.)

== Statute of limitations ==
The Italian criminal system has a statute limiting the time for prosecution of all crimes, apart from felonies punishable by life imprisonment, to a period of time equalling the maximum penalty provided for by law, which cannot, though, be less than six years for delitti (felonies) and four years for contravvenzioni (misdemeanours).

It is not enough that the criminal suit be started before the statute of limitations runs out: it is the definitive sentence (possibly involving three trials) that must be handed down before the term expires.

There is also another statute of limitations, limiting the time for enforcing a penalty, to a period of time provided for by law: twice the time to be served, or ten years in the case of a fine, when dealing with a felony; five years, when dealing with misdemeanours.

== Special proceedings ==
Generally, every criminal proceeding follows the same pattern: there are the preliminary investigations, there is a preliminary hearing, the trial and the appeals. It may occur, though, that one of these phases is not present.

=== Direct trial (giudizio direttissimo) ===
When the defendant was arrested in flagrante delicto, the prosecutor can order that he be conducted before the judge of the trial, within thirty days of the arrest, if he is still in remedial custody; if he was freed, the prosecutor summons the defendant to appear before the court. If there is no need to carry out any further investigations, the defendant will be tried immediately.

The prosecutor and the defendant can appeal the judgment.

=== Immediate trial (giudizio immediato) ===
When it appears manifest that the indagato has committed the crime, if this does not seriously compromise the investigations, and when the indagato has been interrogated, or, summoned before the public prosecutor, has not appeared, or when the imputato is under provisional arrest, the public prosecutor can apply to the Judge for the Preliminary Investigations for the immediate trial.

This application must be submitted within 90 days of the beginning of the investigations.

The imputato too can apply for the immediate trial.

If the Judge for the Preliminary Hearing grants this request, the Preliminary Hearing does not take place.

=== Criminal Decree of Conviction (decreto penale di condanna) ===
When the public prosecutor deems that the defendant should just be handed down a fine (even if inflicted in lieu of a prison sentence), he may apply, within one year of the beginning of the investigations, to the judge for the preliminary investigations for a criminal decree of conviction.

The application must indicate the evidence gathered so far and the punishment considered adequate, which can be diminished to up to half the penalty imposed by law. The judge can return the documents to the public prosecutor or inflict the punishment requested.

The defendant can impugn the decree within fifteen days of the service of the decree. If this happens, the defendant is summoned before the judge of the preliminary hearing.

In his criminal complaint, the injured party can declare that he does not want the defendant to be convicted by decree.

== Review of trial ==
When new evidence is discovered that by itself or together with that presented during the trial might justify an acquittal, the convict, his next of kin, his guardian, his heir (if the convict is dead) or the Procuratore Generale presso la Corte d'Appello (the Public Prosecutor attached to the Court of Appeals) may apply to the Court of Appeals for a review of trial. The Court decides de plano with an ordinanza if the application is receivable; if it deems it is not, the losing party can appeal the ordinanza before the Corte di Cassazione.

If the Court of Appeals, or the Court of Cassation, deems that the application is receivable, the second part of the review begins before the Court of Appeals itself. During the new trial, the Court reexamines all evidence and can acquit the defendant or uphold his conviction; the verdict is, then appealable before the Court of Cassation. Even if an application for review was turned down before, the convict can apply again, so long as he presents new evidence. A "not guilty" verdict, which has become irrevocable (by being upheld by the Court of Cassation) can never be reviewed.

Other cases of review are as follows:

- The conviction was based upon the facts ascertained by a civil or administrative Judge and his judgement has been revoked.
- The conviction was the consequence of perjury, bribery or of another crime and the conviction for this crime is irrevocable.
- There is discrepancy between the findings of fact contained in the conviction and in another irrevocable one.

== Bibliography ==
- Danilo Iacobacci, The Italian Criminal Procedure System in Four Sentences, 2023
- Mario Pisani et al. Manuale di procedura penale. Bologna, Monduzzi Editore, 2006. ISBN 88-323-6109-4
- Giuseppe Riccio, Giorgio Spangher, La Procedura Penale. Napoli, Edizioni Scientifiche Italiane, 2002. ISBN 88-495-0560-4
- VV.AA. Diritto processuale penale Ed. AmbienteDiritto.it — Law Journal. ISSN 1974-9562
