= Life imprisonment in Italy =

In Italy, life imprisonment (Italian: ergastolo) is the most severe punishment provided by law, and has an indeterminate length. Article 22 of the Italian Penal Code defines life imprisonment as "perpetual, and is taken for granted in one of the establishments destined for this, with the obligation of work and with night-time isolation", thus meaning that the sentence may last for the remainder of the convicted person's life. It is a mandatory punishment for aggravated cases of murder, aggravated cases of terrorism, felony murder in cases where serious violent offences result in death, using a weapon of mass destruction by causing an endemic through the spread of pathogenic germs in the case of a biological weapon, and mafia association under aggravated circumstances. It is also a possible punishment for terrorism, poisoning of water or food supplies, and treason.

After 10 years (8 in case of good behavior) the prisoner may be given permission to work outside the prison during the day and/or to spend up to 45 days a year at home, and after 26 (or 21 in case of good behavior) years, they may be paroled. The admission to work outside the jail or to be paroled needs to be approved by a special court (Tribunale di Sorveglianza) which determines whether or not an inmate is suitable for libertà condizionata (parole). Unless they co-operate with the authorities, prisoners sentenced for associations with Mafia activities and/or terrorism are ineligible for parole, and thus will spend the rest of their life in prison.

A person sentenced to multiple life sentences in Italy may be required by the minister of justice to serve a period of between 6 months to years in the "41-bis regime" of solitary confinement, subject to extension and review. Italian prisoners subject to special surveillance ("41-bis regime") may be in de facto solitary confinement. Since 1994, the maximum sentence for a person under age 18 has been a term of 30 years' imprisonment (20 years of imprisonment if the sentence effective after age 18).
