= EuroChocolate =

Chocolate festival held in Perugia, Italy

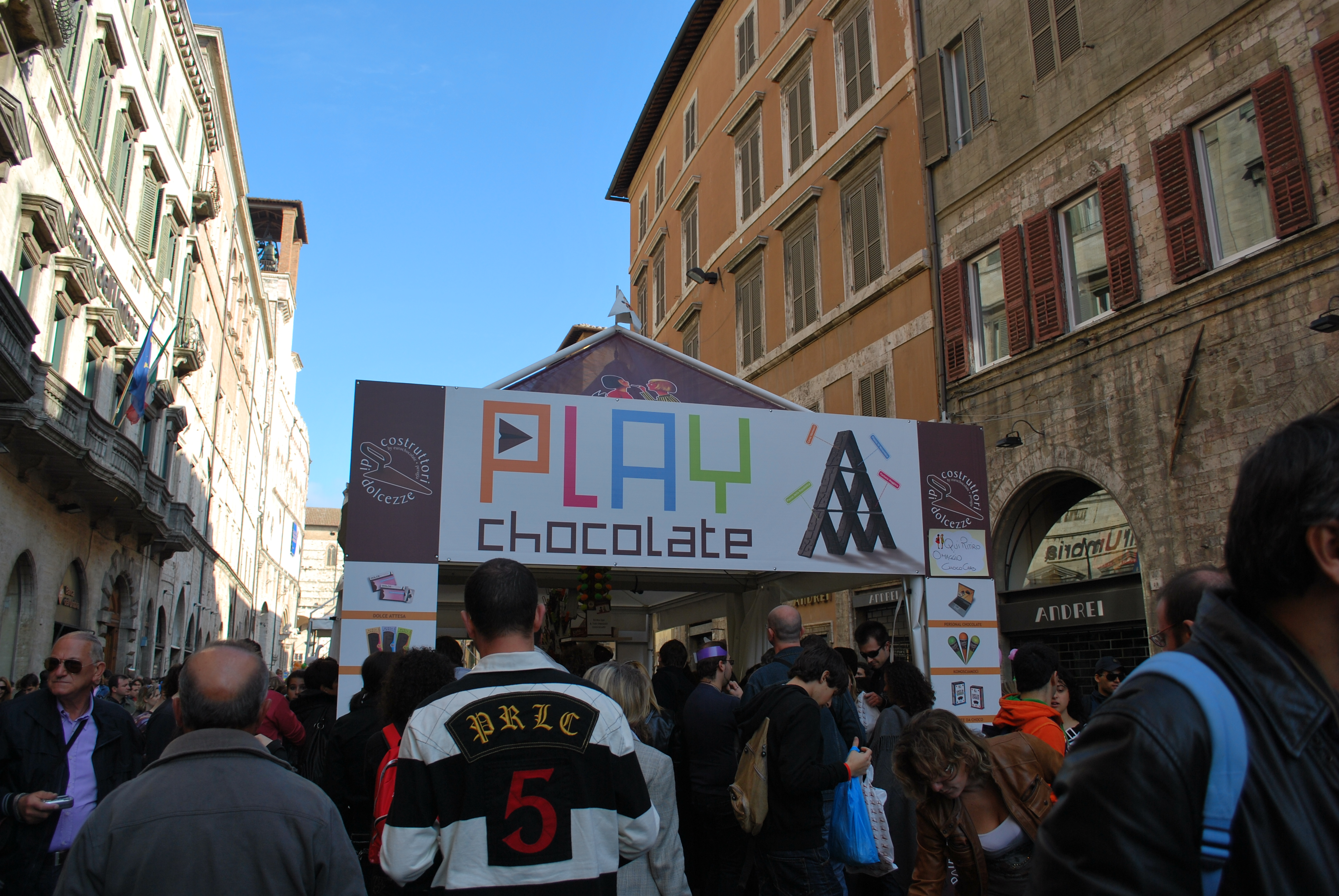
EuroChocolate 2008

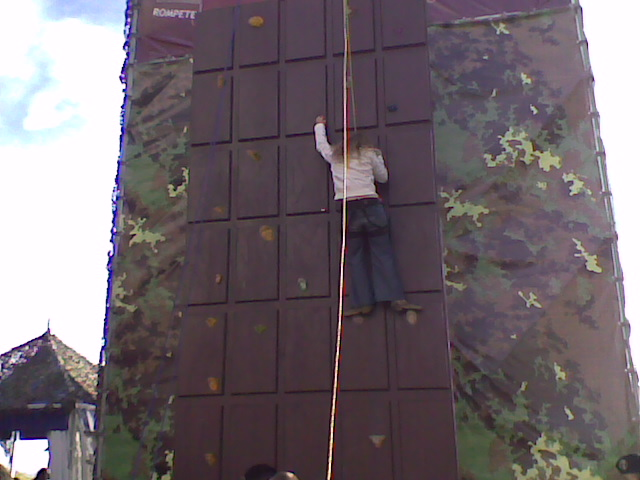
A climbing wall made to look like chocolate, at EuroChocolate 2009

EuroChocolate is an annual chocolate festival that takes place in Perugia, in the Umbria region of central Italy. The festival has been held since 1993, and is one of the largest chocolate festivals in Europe. EuroChocolate draws nearly one million tourists and Italian natives each year. It lasts for nine days and is located in the squares and areas of Piazza Italia, Piazza Della Repubblica, Corso Vannucci, Via Mazzini, Via Fani, The Terrace of the Covered Market, and Piazza IV Novembre.

Italy's most well-known chocolate company Perugina (now belonging to Nestlé), known for their Baci, is represented along with several other brands such as Lindt and Caffarel. EuroChocolate offers many snack and souvenir options such as chocolate-covered bananas, chocolate liqueur, chocolate moulds, and chocolate bricks.

EuroChocolate offers a variety of activities including chocolate art displays, experimental chocolate tastings, street performances, and chocolate sculpting. In recent years, an igloo has been constructed out of 3,600 kilograms (7,900 lb) of chocolate bricks. There is even an opportunity to make a chocolate day spa appointment. In 2003 the largest chocolate bar in the world was constructed. It measured over 7 metres (23 ft) in length, 2 metres (6 ft 7 in) in height and used 5,980 kilograms (13,180 lb) of dark chocolate and thousands of hazelnuts.

EuroChocolate has extended to other Italian cities, such as Rome and Turin.
