= Corte d'Assise =

Italian court

The Corte d'Assise (English: Court of Assizes) is an Italian court composed of two professional, stipendiary judges or giudici togati; and six lay judges or giudici popolari, who are selected from the people. The Corte d'Assise has jurisdiction to try all crimes carrying a maximum penalty of 24 years in prison or more. These are the most serious crimes, such as terrorism and murder. Slavery, killing a consenting human being, and helping a person to commit suicide are also serious crimes that are tried by this court. Penalties imposed by the court can include life sentences (ergastolo). The Corte d'Assise does not preside over cases involving attempted murder.

The prosecution is conducted by the Public Prosecutor (Pubblico Ministero). Decisions are made by giudici togati and giudici popolari together at a special meeting held behind closed doors, named Council Chamber (Camera di Consiglio), and the Corte d'Assise is required to publish written explanations of its decisions.

== Composition ==
The Corte d'Assise is composed of two professional judges and six lay judges.

=== Professional judges ===
The professional judges (magistrates) perform the duties of president and giudice a latere (English: sitting by judge). In the Corte d'Assise d'Appello (English: Appellate Courts of Assizes) the judges must be members of the Court of Appeals.

=== Lay judges ===
Lay judges for both the Corte d'Assise and the Corte d'Assise d'Appello have to be older than thirty and younger than sixty-five. Lay judges for the Corte d'Assise must have completed their education to the level of junior high school (scuola media). The lay judges for the Corte d'Assise d'Appello must hold a diploma from a senior high school (scuola superiore).

=== Exclusions ===
The following people cannot be appointed to the office of lay judge:

- judges or other members of the judiciary system;
- members of the armed forces or police;
- ministers of any religion and clergymen.

=== Office of lay judge and appointment thereto ===
In every municipality (comune), a board composed by the mayor and two members of the municipal council (Consiglio Comunale) form two registers containing all the citizens meeting the aforementioned criteria. If they do not see to that, the president of the local courthouse (Tribunale) acts in their stead. The registers are then transmitted to the president of the courthouse. A board is then convened, formed by the president and all the mayors of the municipalities of the district, to form a register of all the eligible citizens living in that district. The register is then published and all citizen may raise objections within 15 days from publication. The registers are revised every two years. When a crime needs to be tried, the president of the courthouse draws the names of the lay judges and of their substitutes in a public audience. After being appointed, the lay judges take the following oath:

Con la ferma volontà di compiere da persona d'onore tutto il mio dovere, cosciente della suprema importanza morale e civile dell'ufficio che la legge mi affida, giuro di ascoltare con diligenza e di esaminare con serenità prove e ragioni dell'accusa e della difesa, di formare il mio intimo convincimento giudicando con rettitudine ed imparzialità, e di tenere lontano dall'animo mio ogni sentimento di avversione e di favore, affinché la sentenza riesca quale la società deve attenderla: affermazione di verità e di giustizia. Giuro altresì di conservare il segreto.

Through the oath, they swear they will diligently listen to the reasons of both the prosecution and the defense, will serenely examine the evidence, and will honestly and impartially judge. The lay judges are paid for every day of actual exercise of their duty. In these instances, they are considered public officials. They continue in office for three months, or until the trial in which they are serving ends. Lay judges wear a sash in the national colours and are not technically jurors, as the term is understood in Anglo-Saxon jurisprudence. The Italian word Giudice (Judge) refers both to the eight together as a collective body and to each of them considered separately as a member of that body.

Since lay judges are not jurors, they cannot be excused, unless there are grounds that would also justify an objection to a judge. So, the office is practically mandatory. Also, they are not sequestered, because a trial often lasts too long to restrict travel. An Italian trial, including the preliminary investigations, preliminary hearing, trial and appeals, can last several years. Keeping a citizen - who continues to work, while serving as a lay judge - sequestered for years would be unfeasible.

== Appeals ==
=== Corte d'Assise d'Appello ===
Both the defendant and the prosecutor can appeal a decision from the Corte d'Assise to the Corte d'Assise d'Appello. The Corte d'Assise d'Appello has the same composition of judges and lay judges as the Corte d'Assise, but the professional judges are senior relative to the judges in the first court. The Corte d'Assise d'Appello must also publish written explanations of its decisions. This appeal includes a complete review of the evidence – in effect a retrial.

=== Cassazione ===
Both the prosecutor and the defendant can appeal to the top appeal court, named Supreme Court of Cassation (Corte Suprema di Cassazione). The Court of Cassation only judges the correct application of the law in the lower courts and does not review the evidence. If the Court of Cassation does not uphold the sentence given by the first court, it usually orders a new trial in front of a different court, namely a Corte d'Assise d'Appello different from the previous one (in another district).

== See also ==
- Cour d'assises, the French version of Corte d'Assise
- Court of assizes (Belgium)
