= Still Life with Crows =

Novel by Lincoln Child

- Author: Lincoln Child, Douglas Preston
- Language: English
- Series: Aloysius Pendergast
- Genre: Thriller, science fiction
- Publisher: Grand Central Publishing
- Publication date: July 1, 2003
- Publication place: United States
- Media type: Print, e-book, audiobook
- Pages: 480 pp.
- ISBN: 0-446-53142-1
- OCLC: 51088139
- Dewey Decimal: 813/.54 21
- LC Class: PS3566.R3982 S7 2003
- Preceded by: The Cabinet of Curiosities
- Followed by: Brimstone

Still Life with Crows is a thriller novel by American authors Douglas Preston and Lincoln Child, released on July 1, 2003 by Grand Central Publishing. It is the fourth novel (behind Relic (1995), Reliquary (1997) and The Cabinet of Curiosities (2002)) to feature FBI Special Agent Pendergast as protagonist.

== Plot ==
Agent Pendergast visits Medicine Creek, Kansas after a gruesome murder occurs. With the help of local teenaged misfit Corrie Swanson, he continues to investigate as more citizens are killed. Pendergast is soon led to believe that the murderer must be a member of the community. He soon discovers that the murders are connected to an old curse.

== Detailed plot ==
A mutilated corpse is found in a cornfield in Medicine Creek, Kansas, drawing Agent Pendergast there. Since he is technically on vacation, he has no official status or resources, and is barely tolerated by the local Sheriff, Hazen.

The victim, a petty con artist and relic hunter named Sheila Swegg, was found naked in a clearing, with her neck broken. A grisly tableau around the body, consisting of crows impaled on arrows, indicates the work of a serial killer. Pendergast surprises the police when he notices that the arrows are genuine 19th century Cheyenne artifacts, and moreover are almost impossibly well-preserved.

Pendergast shares some of these details with the editor of the town newspaper, in exchange for an overview of the town and its population. Based on his information, the editor produces a somewhat sensationalist news story, associating the murder with a local town legend, "The Curse of the Forty-Fives."

But Pendergast upsets both the Sheriff and the editor with his opinion that the killer is local to Medicine Creek, for the simple reason that the town is so isolated that no one could have entered the area from outside without being seen.

Finding it inconvenient to conduct his investigations on foot, Pendergast hires a local teenager, Corrie Swanson, to chauffeur him around in her battered AMC Gremlin. Corrie, a Goth who lives alone with her alcoholic mother, is the town misfit, who has frequently been arrested for loitering. Though she is suspicious of Pendergast, she eagerly accepts his offer of $100 a day, just for her driving skills and the benefit of her familiarity with the town.

Before long, additional murders are committed, also in the corn field. Following Pendergast around, Corrie is surprised to find herself drawn into the investigation. For all their differences, Pendergast is the first person to value Corrie's abilities and entrust her with responsibility, and she unexpectedly thrives on the experience. As he explains it, her assistance is invaluable to him, since she is intimately familiar with the townspeople and their secrets, and yet, as an outsider, has no problem telling him the unvarnished truth.

The other victims found in the cornfield are likewise arranged in bizarre tableaus, but markedly different from the first one. While going over the ground, Pendergast gives Corrie a brief lecture on the classification of serial murder, and the difference between "organized" and "disorganized" killers. What is intriguing is that Medicine Creek's killer does not fall readily into either category: some of his attacks are unplanned and seemingly random, while his "organized" killings vary widely in their ritual aspects.

Corrie takes Pendergast to meet "Brushy Jim," a semi-deranged Vietnam veteran who is an avid collector of Old West memorabilia, and the town authority on "The Curse of the Forty-Fives." Pleased to have an interested audience, Jim tells the story: the Forty-Fives were a group of Confederate Army veterans who formed a guerilla band after the Civil War to hunt Native Americans in the Kansas territory and make it "safe" for the white settlers. The Forty-Fives were both cowardly and brutal, and their modus operandi was to attack unprotected villages and slaughter the women and children. One night, a group of Cheyenne warriors managed to ambush the Forty-Fives, appearing behind their sentries and disappearing like ghosts, after killing all of them. The Forty-Fives' leader, horribly mutilated, pronounced a curse on the land shortly before he died.

When a visiting scientist is found murdered, the Sheriff develops his own theory of the case: Medicine Creek and a neighboring town, both of which are dying economically, were competing for a contract from Kansas State University, to plant an experimental field of genetically-engineered corn for ethanol production. The "serial killings" must be a sham by the administration of the other town, to scare the scientist and the university away from Medicine Creek.

The Sheriff becomes so enamored of his theory that he appeals to Pendergast's regional F.B.I. superior, to have him removed from the case. Corrie is surprised, and upset, when Pendergast appears to passively accept this, and gently informs her that her services are no longer required.

Unwilling to give up, Corrie thinks over the case at home, and comes up with an interesting clue: one of the killer's victims was, unusually, boiled whole. There are few places with either the equipment or the privacy needed to do such a thing, but one is a local tourist attraction, Kraus's Kaverns. The elderly owner of a small bed-and-breakfast near the cavern entrance, Winifred Kraus, is the daughter of a Prohibition-era bootlegger who kept a secret still in the cave.

Determined to check out the clue herself, Corrie goes to the cave alone. But after confirming the existence of the still, she stumbles onto the entrance to a much larger cave system, and becomes hopelessly lost. She then realizes, to her horror, that the killer is in there with her.

Pendergast and the Sheriff separately reach the same conclusion about the killer's likely hiding place. They likewise stumble onto the vast cavern system and narrowly manage to save Corrie and critically wound the killer, though several of the Sheriff's deputies are killed.

After emerging from the cave, Pendergast apprehends Ms. Kraus, and explains what has been going on: during the 1950s, the young Ms. Kraus became pregnant with an illegitimate child; her father, who was a sternly religious man as well as a bootlegger, imprisoned her in the cavern for the period of her pregnancy, and that is where she bore her son, whom she named Job. Her father never allowed Job to see the light of day, but, later, after he had died, Ms. Kraus grew to like the idea of keeping her son safe and loved inside the cave. The result was a pure sociopath, who spent the first fifty years of his life without contact with the outside world at all, or with any human being except his mother. He also became physically powerful from roaming and climbing around the caves.

Sheila Swegg, the first victim, accidentally discovered the entrance to the cave system while digging for relics (the same entrance used by the Cheyenne warriors to ambush the Forty-Fives). Job killed her, purely by accident, and then came out to explore the new world. With a child's brain inside a man's body, he had no sense of morality, and no way of understanding the murderous nature of his "playing" with other people.

Corrie recovers from her ordeal. One night, as she is preparing for bed, Job accosts her window and begins chasing her. She narrowly avoids being killed by offering to be his "friend." Mental health authorities arrive and take Job into custody.

The discovery of the caverns beneath Medicine Creek revitalizes the town's tourist industry, saving its economy without recourse to the somewhat controversial ethanol field contract. With the money she has earned as Pendergast's assistant, Corrie prepares for a road trip to track down her father, who left the family when Corrie was very young. Corrie is not expecting any miracles, but is hoping for closure. To her amazement, Pendergast also tells her that he has endowed her with an educational trust fund to escape Medicine Creek and attend Phillips Exeter Academy in New Hampshire.

In a nearby sanitorium, Pendergast and Sheriff Hazen watch as Ms. Kraus is allowed to say goodbye to Job, before he is committed to another facility. Watching her read one of his favorite books to him, they realize that there was a pattern in Job's gruesome tableaus after all: he was re-creating scenes from old nursery rhymes.

== Continuity ==
- While waiting for Pendergast, Corrie occupies herself with a paperback novel called Beyond the Ice Limit, a fictional sequel to Preston and Child's novel, The Ice Limit.
- There are several references to the events of the previous novel, The Cabinet of Curiosities:
  - Wren, the mysterious denizen of the New York Public Library, reappears, engaged in cataloguing the extensive natural history collections found in the Beaux Arts mansion of Pendergast's ancestor, Antoine Pendergast (a.k.a. Enoch Leng) that were discovered in Cabinet;
  - In giving Corrie her scholarship, Pendergast confides that he recently came into an inheritance from an "old relative," who did not obtain his money by good works. This is a reference to Antoine/Enoch.
- This novel also foreshadows the events of the subsequent novel, Brimstone:
  - Wren makes the first reference to Pendergast's brother, Diogenes, who becomes a major character in the next three novels;
  - Constance Greene, who appears prominently in the next three novels, is also introduced, as an unidentified figure watching Wren from the recesses of the mansion.
- Corrie appears in several of the subsequent novels by Preston and Child:
  - she appears briefly in Dance of Death, in which F.B.I. Agents remove her from Exeter to Australia, for her protection, while Pendergast and his close friends are being stalked by his brother, Diogenes;
  - The Book of the Dead ends with a letter, purportedly written by Corrie to Preston and Child, telling them that she has graduated Exeter and plans to spend a year in New York City, working and learning, before attending university at NYU;
  - Corrie also appears in the 2011 novel Cold Vengeance in a supporting role;
  - She is a protagonist of the 2013 novel White Fire.

== References to real-life history, events, or persons ==
- Pendergast refers to several prior cases of feral children or children psychologically damaged by long-term isolation from other human beings: the Wolf Child of Aveyron, for instance.
