= The Ice Limit =

Novel by Lincoln Child

- Softcover edition
- Author: Lincoln Child; Douglas Preston
- Language: English
- Genre: Technothriller
- Publisher: Grand Central Publishing
- Publication date: 18 July 2000
- Publication place: United States
- Media type: Print (hardback)
- Pages: 464 pp
- ISBN: 978-0-446-52587-9
- OCLC: 43207239
- Dewey Decimal: 813/.54 21
- LC Class: PS3566.R3982 I27 2000
- Preceded by: Thunderhead
- Followed by: The Cabinet of Curiosities

The Ice Limit is a techno-thriller novel by American authors Douglas Preston and Lincoln Child. The book was published on July 18, 2000 by Grand Central Publishing.

== Plot summary ==
Meteorite hunter Nestor Masangkay arrives on Isla Desolación, an island near Cape Horn in Chile, tracking a possible meteorite. Using a tomographic scanner, Masangkay confirms that not only is there a meteorite present under the ground, but that it is incredibly massive. Excited, Masangkay digs down to unearth a small portion of the meteorite and is subsequently killed in a flash of light.

Some months later, Masangkay's equipment is recovered by a Yaghan native and eventually makes its way to New York billionaire Palmer Lloyd, a collector of rare and exotic archaeological artifacts. Wanting the meteorite for his soon-to-be-opened museum, Lloyd hires Masangkay's former partner, Sam McFarlane, to confirm the meteorite's existence and assist in its recovery. He also hires Effective Engineering Solutions, Inc., a high-priced "problem solving" firm, to design a plan for the unprecedented task of recovering and transporting what has been confirmed by McFarlane to be the largest meteorite ever discovered.

Eli Glinn, the president of EES, puts together a comprehensive plan to effect the recovery, accounting for literally every complication he deems possible. To effect this plan he composes a team to augment Lloyd's personnel, notably including Rachel Amira, EES's brilliant yet grating mathematics expert, and Sally Britton, an out-of-work supertanker captain whose last ship crashed while she was drunk and on duty. Despite Britton's public image as a dangerous alcoholic, analysis by EES has led Glinn to peg her as professional, talented, and motivated never to fail again. After meeting her in person, Glinn finds himself becoming attracted to her.

Glinn's expedition sets off for Cape Horn in a brand new oil supertanker, the Rolvaag, retrofitted with various high tech equipment but disguised to appear as worn down, barely functional ship, traveling under the guise of a failing mining company searching for iron ore. Despite possessing a legitimate mining agreement to this effect, Glinn is forced to bribe local Chilean officials for access to Isla Desolación, falsely confessing that they are searching for gold in order to allay any further suspicions. Both of these actions are witnessed by Commandante Vallenar, a locally stationed Chilean Navy officer, who objects angrily but is powerless to stop the bribes from being accepted.

Once on Isla Desolación, operations start almost immediately. The body of Masangkay is recovered and analyzed by the expedition's doctor, who concludes that he was killed by a lightning strike; McFarlane attributes this to the meteorite acting as a lightning rod. Once properly examined, the meteorite is shown to be much smaller — and denser — than initially expected. However, when Glinn's crew attempts to lift the meteorite using hydraulic jacks the units fail, killing two members of the expedition. Tests McFarlane run on a sample of the meteorite reveal that the exterior of the meteorite is a single element, not an alloy, and has an approximate atomic number of 177. Though this explains why the jacks failed — the weight of the meteorite is somewhere in the area of 25,000 tons, more than double what was expected — it is also staggering scientific discovery: no known element has an atomic number anywhere near 177. McFarlane speculates that this element is part of the undiscovered elemental "island of stability", and further states that the meteorite could only have come from outside the Solar System. During this time, McFarlane also becomes romantically involved with Amira.

Now properly accounting for its weight, Glinn's crew is able to load the meteorite onto a massive cart which will move the meteorite to the Rolvaag. That evening, Commandante Vallenar sends a member of his crew, Timmers, to investigate Glinn's excavation. Timmers infiltrates the dig site, kills a guard, and enters the area housing the meteorite. Surprised by what he discovers, Timmers reaches out to touch the meteorite and is fatally electrocuted. Though confused at first, the expedition eventually is able to piece together what happened, concluding that the meteorite discharges electricity on contact. Plans to move the meteorite continue, albeit much more carefully. At the same time, Commandante Vallenar positions himself off the coast of Isla Desolación to prevent the Rolvaag from leaving. Glinn meets with the Commandante in an attempt to secure safe passage, admitting that the expedition is there to recover a meteorite, but is rebuffed by Vallenar.

The next evening Glinn and his crew load the meteorite onto the ship under cover of fog, leaving lights and running equipment on Isla Desolación to serve as a distraction, then break for the open sea. When Commandante Vallenar fires on the Rolvaag and gives chase Glinn detonates two explosive devices surreptitiously placed on the Commandante's propellers during his visit, disabling the Chilean ship. This proves to be a temporary solution, as Vallenar's crew is able to replace one of the damaged propellers. By this time the Rolvaag is well on its way to international waters, and Glinn predicts that Vallenar will not pass the Chilean border (however, the doctrine of hot pursuit appears to allow this). When the Commandante continues pursuing them, Glinn belatedly realizes that Timmers must have been Vallenar's son; Vallenar has realized that Timmers is dead and intends to kill them out of vengeance. Captain Britton also notes that Vallenar's course has now cut them off from any chance of help. With no other choice, Glinn orders the ship to proceed south towards the Ice Limit, the border of Antarctic waters, where icebergs and even ice islands are common.

During the Rolvaag's flight the meteorite discharges again, though this time without anyone touching its surface. Eventually McFarlane and Amira figure out what causes the electrical discharges: contact with salt-containing liquids such as human sweat or ocean water. Meanwhile, Vallenar's ship closes on the Rolvaag over the course of several hours, getting into firing range just as the ship enters an area of icebergs. Though Captain Britton is able to avoid destruction by feigning the ship being in distress, eventually Vallenar inflicts enough damage to disable the ship completely. As his vessel closes between two ice islands to destroy the Rolvaag, a team of Glinn's men detonate explosives on one of the towering icebergs, shearing off a massive chunk of ice which capsizes and sinks the Commandante's ship.

Though no longer pursued by the Chilean Commandante, the Rolvaag is now dead in the water, and the nearest rescue vessel is unable to approach for several hours due to a storm in the area. The continuing rough seas begin to take their toll on the ship; eventually Captain Britton realizes that the meteorite is severely unbalancing the ship, and must be jettisoned to prevent the Rolvaag from being snapped in half. At first both Palmer Lloyd and Sam McFarlane object vehemently to the idea, but after some argument admit that it may be the only way to save the ship and themselves. Glinn prepares to activate the jettisoning system, but abruptly stops, declaring that he is certain the ship will survive. Attempts to convince him otherwise fail, and as he is the only person with access to the system the crew has no choice but to abandon ship. Glinn moves to the meteorite holding area, attempting to secure the meteorite, only to discover that most of the securing devices have failed. Undaunted, he continues his efforts until he is interrupted by Captain Britton, who begs him to leave the ship with her in a lifeboat, confessing, "I could love you, Eli." Moments later the meteorite makes contact with the ocean, discharging a massive amount of electricity.

McFarlane, Amira, Lloyd, and the rest of the crew watch from the lifeboats as the Rolvaag snaps in half and sinks. The lifeboats are ill-prepared for the harsh Antarctic waters, and many of the crew start to suffer from hypothermia immediately. The survivors take refuge on an ice island, where they start to slowly succumb to the extreme conditions. Amira attempts to tell McFarlane something she concluded about the meteorite, giving him a CD containing the test data they collected, but before she can finish she dies. McFarlane begins to slip away as well, but before he can the crew is rescued by a helicopter.

Three days later, Palmer Lloyd and the handful of survivors are recovering inside a British Antarctic science station. Sam McFarlane arrives in Lloyd's room and begins to tell him about Amira's attempts to tell him about her discovery. Though Lloyd refuses to engage him, McFarlane continues speaking, describing a series of small ocean floor earthquakes recorded at a specific Antarctic location, and then revealing that the Rolvaag sank at the same location. He finishes by saying that he has figured out what Amira wanted to say: that what they recovered was not a meteorite, it was a seed, and that it is now sprouting.

== Connections to other works by Preston and Child ==
- The novel Still Life with Crows makes reference to a fictional Preston and Child book called Beyond the Ice Limit, apparently a sequel to The Ice Limit. The novel Dance of Death makes a reference to a second fictional sequel, Ice Limit III: Return to Cape Horn. The authors promised an actual sequel to The Ice Limit at some point, and in fact Beyond the Ice Limit was published on May 17, 2016.
- In the novel The Cabinet of Curiosities, while exploring 891 Riverside Drive in search of Enoch Leng, Aloysius Pendergast discovers a large ruby red meteorite sitting on display. While it is not the same meteorite referred to in The Ice Limit, due to its unusual color, it could be a dormant spore acquired by Leng for his collection. In The Ice Limit, protagonist Sam MacFarlane refers to these ruby meteorites as evidence of panspermia. Toward the beginning of the novel there is a brief mention of the proposed Lloyd museum.
- Eli Glinn appears as a supporting character in both Dance of Death and its sequel, The Book of the Dead. He is revealed to have lost an eye and been using a wheelchair following the events of The Ice Limit, but still owns and operates Effective Engineering Solutions, Inc. Glinn and EES, Inc. also appear in the Gideon Crew series, serving as the employer of protagonist Gideon Crew.

== Webilogue ==
After The Ice Limit was published, the authors posted an epilogue at their website. Written as a short collection of fictional newspaper articles, it describes the survivors of Ice Limit setting off onto a new expedition into the Antarctic regions, in order to face the consequences of their actions in the novel.

== Reception ==
- Jeff Ayers' review for the Library Journal said, "all the elements of a great adventure are here: the reluctant and formerly disgraced meteorite hunter hero, the quest for something seemingly unattainable, and the battle against the elements."
- In her review for School Library Journal, Pam Johnson wrote: "this is a tempestuous adventure of high seas, high stakes, and high excitement. As characters enter the story, their personalities expand along with the intricate plot, taking on more intensity and power. The extreme hostility of the environment eventually proves to be the deciding factor. Like Sebastian Junger's The Perfect Storm, this natural thriller is not to be missed."
- Publishers Weekly's review said, "what the novel lacks in sophistication, it makes up for in athleticism: this is a big-boned thriller, one that will make a terrific summer movie as well as a memorable hot-day read."
