= Aloysius Pendergast =

Fictional character created by Douglas Preston and Lincoln Child

- First appearance: Relic
- Last appearance: Angel of Vengeance
- Created by: Douglas Preston and Lincoln Child

In-universe information
- Gender: Male
- Title: Dual Doctor of Philosophy (Classics and Philosophy)
- Occupation: Special agent with FBI
- Spouse: Helen Pendergast
- Children: Tristram Pendergast, Alban Pendergast
- Relatives: See The Pendergast family

Aloysius Xingu Leng Pendergast is a fictional character appearing in novels by Douglas Preston and Lincoln Child. He first appeared as a supporting character in their first novel, Relic (1995), and in its 1997 sequel Reliquary, before assuming the protagonist's role in the 2002 novel The Cabinet of Curiosities.

Pendergast is a special agent with the United States Federal Bureau of Investigation (FBI). He once worked out of the New Orleans Field Office of the FBI, but resides in New York City and works out of the New York Field Office; he frequently travels out of state to investigate cases which interest him, often those appearing to be the work of serial killers.

== Background ==
Aloysius Xingu Leng Pendergast was born in early December 1960 and raised in New Orleans, Louisiana. Pendergast retains his Southern manners and mellifluous Deep Southern accent. He studied anthropology at Harvard University (graduating summa cum laude) and received two D. Phil. degrees, one in Classics and the other in philosophy, from Balliol College, Oxford.

Pendergast once served with the U.S. Special Forces in the elite "Ghost Company", a spiritual successor to the "Blue Light" detachment (now Delta Force) with Michael Decker and Howard Longstreet, his superiors at the FBI, and Proctor, who later became his bodyguard and chauffeur. The symbol for this company was "a ghost on a blue field, decorated with a star throwing a thunderbolt at a cat's eye with the number nine as its pupil, symbolizing the nine lives [its] members [...] were alleged to have..." The motto was "Fidelitas usque ad mortem" (Loyalty unto death). Most of his military records are classified and unknown.

A number of years before the series began, Pendergast was married to Helen Esterhazy Pendergast. She was presumed killed in a hunting accident while in Africa (mauled by a lion), but reappears in the "Helen Trilogy".

Pendergast is generally described as being stoically aloof and eccentric, though his ineffable politeness and unerring intellect imbue him with an irresistible charm or enigmatic sense of danger if the occasion should call for it. Well-learned in many subjects, he converses easily with doctors, scientists, intellectuals, vagabonds, highly specialized masters of specific disciplines, and people of a wide variety of language and culture alike. He is a master of psychological manipulation, disguise, and improvisation.

Pendergast has a special intense disdain for officious pompous incompetent bureaucrats, and when he needs to approach them for one reason or another in his investigations, first does an in-depth study of their personal and professional lives, successfully using past corrupt, incompetent, or even criminal actions against them to get cooperation. Many find these scenes the most enjoyable in the books.

Pendergast appreciates the finer things in life, including expensive cuisine and wines. Food and drink he enjoys include Château Pétrus wine, antipasto, green tea of only the purest and most spiritual kind, gelato, and steak tartare. He has a great distaste for opera, and a disdain for the lobster roll, but will consume convenience store staples, like beef jerky, when tasks require such expediency. His interests encompass a wide variety of vastly differing walks of life, yet all focus on the enlightenment of the human mind, body, and soul. He spent a year in Tibet studying the deep meditative art of Chongg Ran, taught to him by the monks of the Gsalrig Chongg monastery.

Pendergast is polyglot, demonstrating mastery of French, Italian, Latin, Greek, and Cantonese, and appears semi-fluent in Mandarin. He also has some knowledge of Japanese and Portuguese. He communicates with one of his housekeepers, who is deaf and mute, using American Sign Language.

== Appearance ==
Pendergast is always described as being tall and slender. He is fit, graceful in movement and physically powerful despite his slight frame. His skin is very pale and many people refer to him as "corpse-like" or as an "albino". He has platinum blond hair, and eyes that are most often described as silver or gray. Pendergast religiously dresses in black, bespoke suits (of Italian design) made of a special blend of wool made only in the 1950s, thus he is often described as looking like an undertaker.

In many cases, Pendergast's normal appearance is irrelevant. A master of disguises, he has fooled even close acquaintances on several occasions.

== Accoutrements ==
Pendergast owns a 1959 Rolls-Royce Silver Wraith (he used to have two but sold one). His chauffeur and personal assistant is a mysterious man named Proctor. All of Pendergast's suits are custom-made in Italy, and his shoes hand-made by John Lobb of London.

Pendergast's personal sidearm is usually a customized .45 ACP Les Baer Government Model M1911 pistol. In Relic he carried a .45 Colt Anaconda double-action revolver. He owns a Signature Grade Colt 1911 in .45 ACP tuned by pistol smith Hilton Yam (now owner of 10-8 Consulting).

Pendergast maintains an apartment at The Dakota in New York City, and later inherits and renovates a Beaux Arts mansion near Harlem from his great-granduncle in The Cabinet of Curiosities. In his Dakota apartment, which is actually three apartments combined, there is a full zen garden where Pendergast performs the tea ceremony and sometimes meditates.

Though he is a scrupulously scientific man, he wears a talisman or amulet on a chain, that consists of his own modified version of the Pendergast family crest: a lidless eye over two moons, one new and one full, with a phoenix (the original version featured a lion).

Pendergast carries a variety of hidden tools, such as lock picks, flashlights of various sizes, test tubes, syringes, and forensic chemicals.

== Friends and relations ==
- Lt. Vincent D'Agosta – NYPD (formerly Southampton PD). Possibly Pendergast's most trusted friend and associate.
- Constance Greene – Pendergast's ward, research assistant, social secretary, amanuensis, seer. An anachronism who appears 19, quietly beautiful with violet eyes and auburn hair, and possessing a depth of almost limitless knowledge. Born around 1876, her guardian and sister was experimented on and killed by Pendergast's ancestor, Enoch Leng, during his life-extending elixir process. Enoch informally adopts her at the age of six, while testing elixirs on her and raising her in his reclusive home as a student of erudite knowledge. When Enoch is brutally murdered, she hides in fear into the mansion and its catacombs, traveling only at night through the secret entrance to the Hudson River area of Riverside Drive. Although she has Svengali type feelings for Pendergast, she falls prey to his brother's psychotic seduction resulting in a child. The child is secreted away at the Gsalrig Chongg monastery, where, after her confession of love to Pendergast goes unrequited, Constance retires for a period. Constance returned to New York and was tried for the murder of her child and placed in the Mount Mercy Hospital for the Criminally Insane but later exonerated and released and began acting as a tutor and surrogate "big sister" to Pendergast's son, Tristram, in the 2012 novel Two Graves.
- Proctor – Pendergast's butler and chauffeur with abilities far beyond most people's assumptions. Before becoming Pendergast's butler, he served in the Special Forces Ghost Company with him.
- Wren – a book restorer at the New York Public Library.
- Mime – an invalid of unknown affiliation, Thalidomide baby; skilled in obtaining obscure information via the computer and Internet. Also featured in Mount Dragon as the friend of Charles Levine.
- Dr. Nora Kelly – New York Museum of Natural History curator; also featured as protagonist in Thunderhead, Old Bones, Scorpion's Tail and Diablo Mesa.
- William "Bill" Smithback Jr. – New York Times (formerly New York Post) journalist. (deceased as of Cemetery Dance).
- Captain Laura Hayward – New York City Police Department, married to Vincent D'agosta, not an avid fan of Pendergast's but will often assist in cases.
- Dr. Margo Green – New York Museum of Natural History curator.
- Dr. Viola Maskelene – an Egyptologist, love interest, later "just friends" forever and always as concluded in Two Graves.
- The Monks of the Gsalrig Chongg Monastery.
- Eli Glinn – president of Effective Engineering Solutions, Inc. Expert profiler who gets Pendergast to talk about his childhood and his brother. Also breaks Pendergast out of prison; also featured in The Ice Limit and the Gideon Crew series, beginning with Gideon's Sword.
- Corrie Swanson – from Medicine Creek, Kansas, assisted Pendergast on a case in Still Life with Crows. Previously enrolled at Phillips Exeter Academy; enrolled at John Jay College of Criminal Justice (as of Cold Vengeance). Main character in White Fire. After graduating John Jay, Corrie enrolled with the FBI and is one of the main characters in Old Bones, Scorpion's Tail, and Diablo Mesa.
- Maurice – Former Caretaker of the Pendergast family mansion, Penumbra, in Louisiana, which has been sold.
- Kyoko Ishimura – Pendergast's maid in the Dakota apartment.
- Mrs. Trask - The housekeeper of Pendergast's mansion at 891 Riverside Drive.

== The Pendergast family ==
Officially, much of the Pendergast's family wealth came from pharmaceuticals, and the family was sufficiently old and established in New Orleans to conduct themselves as aristocracy. However, the fortune actually came from patent medicine ("snake oil"), from which some of the customers suffered permanent injury or even death from its effects.

Pendergast also confides, to his shame, that a streak of insanity has afflicted his family for generations, such that many of them have been convicted of horrible crimes, and ended their lives in asylums.

- Diogenes Dagrepont Bernoulli Pendergast – Pendergast's younger brother (born circa 1962). As intelligent as Aloysius, if not more so, but allegedly criminally insane. Although he was always a unique child, Diogenes was pushed over the edge during a traumatic event during their childhoods, resulting in brain damage, heterochromia iridis, the inability to see colors, and the inability to sleep normally. Diogenes is first mentioned in Brimstone, after which he commits a series of grisly murders, for which he frames Aloysius, then a daring theft from the New York Museum of Natural History, to be completed with a horrific mass murder under circumstances similar to the "Event" during his childhood. Aloysius breaks out of prison with the help of his allies, only clearing his name later, and thwarts Diogenes' last crime. The three novels Brimstone, Dance of Death, and The Book of the Dead make up an internal series about the unique fraternal relationship between Aloysius and Diogenes, culminating in the latter's fall into the Sciara del Fuoco in the Stromboli volcano. These are known as the "Diogenes Trilogy". Sherlock Holmes fans will undoubtedly recognize Preston's and Child's homage to Doyle's famous works, in both their choice of first name for Aloysius Pendergast's brother, and in the circumstances of Diogenes's presumed demise. Diogenes reappears, seemingly a changed man in The Obsidian Chamber, claiming that he wants to live out a long, quiet life with Constance at Halcyon Key. After leading him on and joining him at Halcyon, Constance gives Diogenes a humiliating refusal, part of her cruel plan to get revenge; his whereabouts are currently unknown.
- Cornelia Delamere Pendergast – Pendergast's great-aunt, who poisoned her husband, brother and children. Cornelia held residence at the Mount Mercy Hospital for the Criminally Insane until her death. Despite her complete insanity, Pendergast still considered her wise, and sought her counsel when he had a dilemma. Sometime during the events of Fever Dream, Cornelia dies, leaving Pendergast a letter of unknown content.
- Antoine Leng Pendergast (a.k.a. Enoch Leng) – Pendergast's great-grand uncle. Traveled north to New York after being expelled from the Pendergast family because of his pursuit of "unacceptable" and heinous acts involving obeah and voudou (according to Aunt Cornelia). Taxonomist and chemist as well as a member of the New York Lyceum in the late 19th century. Exposed as a serial killer in The Cabinet of Curiosities who killed in the pursuit of a substance that would prolong his life. He succeeded, and survived well into the late 20th century until he was murdered in his home on Riverside Drive. Pendergast now lives in Leng's old mansion with Proctor as butler/chauffeur and Mrs. Trask, the housekeeper. He has refurnished the mansion and made it liveable and elegant, though dim, as the shutters are always closed.
- Hezekiah Pendergast – (Pendergast's great-great grandfather) Antoine's father. Was a traveling salesman who contributed greatly to the family fortune by selling a quack medicine known as "Hezekiah's Compound Elixir and Glandular Restorative". The tonic was eventually exposed as a lethal blend of cocaine, acetanilid, and alkaloid botanicals. It was the cause of uncounted addictions and deaths, including that of Hezekiah's wife and Antoine's mother, Constance Leng Pendergast.
- Henri Pendregast de Mousqueton – a "seventeenth-century mountebank who pulled teeth, performed magic and comedy, and practiced quack medicine."
- Eduard Pendregast – a "well-known Harley Street doctor in eighteenth-century London."
- Comstock Pendergast – Pendergast's great-grand uncle. Famed mesmerist, magician, and mentor to Harry Houdini. Eventually murdered his business partner and his family. He then committed suicide by cutting his throat twice.
- Linnaeus Pendergast – Pendergast's father, who was killed in the fire.
- Isabella Pendergast – Pendergast's mother, also killed in the fire. Her maiden name is Fawcett (in "Two Graves", Pendergast assumes a fake identity, and calls himself "Fawcett").
- Boethius Pendergast – Pendergast's great-grandfather. Lived at the Penumbra plantation about an hour outside New Orleans, was good friends with famed naturalist painter John James Audubon (However, in Fever Dream it is also mentioned that it was Pendergast's great-great-grandfather who was friends with Audubon. Furthermore, in Blue Labyrinth it is mentioned that Pendergast's great-great-great-grandfather was friends with Audubon.).
- Helen Pendergast – Pendergast's deceased wife (maiden name Helen Esterhazy). Helen was a doctor with Doctors With Wings, a group similar to Doctors Without Borders that travels to third-world countries and disaster areas to help people who would have otherwise had little chance of survival. She is a skilled big game hunter, and it was one of the activities that she and Pendergast did together. For many years, she was thought to have been killed on an African safari, but she reappears in the book Cold Vengeance. Helen is killed in the next installment of the series "Two Graves." She is a descendant of the Hungarian Esterházy aristocratic family.
- Judson Esterhazy – Pendergast's brother-in-law. A neurosurgeon and avid game hunter, lived in Savannah, Georgia. Like his sister Helen, he was a doctor with Doctors With Wings and was a skilled hunter. He plays an important role in the "Helen Trilogy" but was killed in "Two Graves.".
- Percy Harrison Fawcett – Pendergast's great-granduncle on his mother's side. He was an explorer and disappeared in the jungles along the Upper Xingu River (hence Pendergast's middle name) in 1925 while looking for the mysterious Lost City of Z.
- Tristram – Pendergast's son with Helen. Pendergast learns of him, and Alban, when they are 15 years old, in "Two Graves." Tristram, the name chosen by Pendergast, attends boarding school at École Mère-Égliseq in St. Moritz, Switzerland.
- Alban – Identical twin of Tristram, a genetically engineered person, more intelligent and stronger than his father. Deceased as of the events in Blue Labyrinth (2014).
- Unnamed nephew - a child of Diogenes Pendergast and Constance Greene, born at and raised by the monks of the Gsalrig Chongg monastery, he is the 19th rinpoche. He was spirited away to India, by monks with the help of Pendergast and Constance, to protect him from enemies of Tibet.

== Chronicles ==
Special Agent Aloysius Pendergast appears in several stand-alone novels and stars in two trilogies. All of these books have been jointly written by Douglas Preston and Lincoln Child.

=== Stand-alone novels ===
- Relic (1995) (Pendergast's first appearance) – Pendergast investigates a series of strange murders and rumors of a murderous beast in the New York Museum of Natural History. Includes Margo Green, reporter Bill Smithback, and Vincent D'Agosta.
- Reliquary (1997) – Pendergast returns to New York when a new string of murders surfaces resembling those of the Museum Beast case. He is again teamed with Margo Green, Dr. Frock, William Smithback Jr., and Vincent D'Agosta (all of whom were in the previous book), and introduces the character of Laura Hayward.
- The Cabinet of Curiosities (2002) – Pendergast is drawn to the remains of a 19th-century charnel house, unearthed at a construction site in New York and finds himself investigating a new series of 21st century copycat killings. He is joined by William Smithback Jr. and Dr. Nora Kelly.
- Still Life with Crows (2003) – Pendergast, while on vacation, travels to midwestern Kansas to the dying farm town of Medicine Creek to investigate a series of brutal and ritualistic killings. He teams up with a teenage malcontent, Corrie Swanson, to solve the case. The book also hints at a sequel to The Ice Limit.
- The Wheel of Darkness (2007) – Pendergast has taken Constance on a whirlwind Grand Tour, after the conclusion of her vengeful pursuit of Diogenes, hoping to give her closure and a sense of the world that she's missed. They head to Tibet, where Pendergast intensively trained in martial arts and spiritual studies. At a remote monastery, they learn that a rare and dangerous artifact the monks have been guarding for generations has been mysteriously stolen. Pendergast agrees to take up the search. The trail leads him and Constance to the maiden voyage of the Brittania, the world's largest and most luxurious passenger liner—and to an Atlantic crossing fraught with terror.
- Cemetery Dance (2009) – Pendergast returns to New York City. Two of his close friends have been attacked by a man who is supposedly dead. Pendergast and D'Agosta undertake a private quest for the truth. Their serpentine journey takes them into a part of Manhattan they never imagined could exist: a secretive and deadly hotbed of Obeah, the West Indian Zombi cult of sorcery and magic.
- White Fire (2013) – Corrie Swanson sets out to solve a long-forgotten mystery. In 1876, in a remote mining camp called Roaring Fork in the Colorado Rockies, several miners were killed in devastating grizzly bear attacks. Now the town has become an exclusive ski resort and its historic cemetery has been dug up to make way for development. Corrie has arranged to examine the remains of the dead miners. But in doing so she makes a discovery that threatens the resort's very existence. The town's leaders, trying to stop her from exposing their community's dark and bloody past, arrest and jail her. Corrie writes to Pendergast, who has taken a year's leave of absence (after the events of the Helen Trilogy) about her project. Pendergast arrives in Colorado a week or two before Christmas to help—just as a series of brutal arson attacks on multimillion-dollar homes terrify the town and drive away tourists. Drawn into the investigation, Pendergast discovers an unlikely secret in Roaring Fork's past, connecting the resort to a meeting between Sir Arthur Conan Doyle and Oscar Wilde.
- Blue Labyrinth (2014) – Pendergast must accept a ruthless killer's challenge when somebody leaves his son Alban's body at the door of his mansion. Contained in Alban's stomach is a rare turquoise that came from a long-deserted mine in California. Pendergast knows he must go there, although he's probably walking into a trap. Sure enough, despite all his precautions, he is exposed to a slow-acting poison—Hezekiah's formula, which killed many people—that quickly begins killing him.
- Crimson Shore (2015) – Pendergast, with his ward Constance Greene, travels to the quaint seaside village of Exmouth, Massachusetts, to investigate the theft of a priceless wine collection. But inside the wine cellar, they find something considerably more disturbing: a bricked-up niche that once held a crumbling skeleton. Pendergast and Constance soon learn that Exmouth is a town with a troubled history, and this skeleton may be only the first hint of an ancient transgression, which is now kept secret. Local legend holds that during the 1692 witch trials in Salem, the real witches escaped, fleeing north to Exmouth and settling deep in the surrounding salt marshes, where they continued to practice their arts. Then, a murdered corpse turns up in the marshes. The only clue is a series of mysterious carvings. Could these symbols bear some relation to the ancient witches' colony, long believed to be abandoned?
- The Obsidian Chamber (2016)
- City of Endless Night (2018)
- Verses for the Dead (2018)
- Crooked River (2020)
- Bloodless (2021)
- The Cabinet of Dr. Leng (2022)
- Angel of Vengeance (2024)

=== The Diogenes trilogy ===
- Brimstone (2004) (Book One) – The murder of a notorious art critic triggers a wave of panic when reporter Bryce Harriman runs a sensationalised story claiming the death is the work of the devil incarnate. Pendergast takes an interest in the case, and with D'Agosta at his side, follows the killer to Italy. There they discover the existence of a legendary Stradivarius violin, and a ruthless Italian count who will stop at nothing to claim it for himself.
- Dance of Death (2005) (Book Two) – With Pendergast missing and presumed to be dead, Vincent D'Agosta returns to New York City to fulfill Pendergast's last request: to stop his brother, Diogenes, from carrying out the perfect crime. But when Pendergast is rescued and nursed back to health by his brother, he realises that Diogenes' scheme is far more chilling than he first thought.
- The Book of the Dead (2006) (Book Three) – Diogenes Pendergast has been stopped for now, but Aloysius Pendergast has been sent to prison, awaiting trial for his life—assuming he lives long enough to be executed. As D'Agosta attempts to break him out of prison, Laura Hayward investigates a series of bizarre killings centred on the long-closed Tomb of Senef at the New York Museum of Natural History. Convinced that Aloysius is innocent, she begins to question Diogenes' involvement in the museum, and the terrifying crime he plans to commit in front of the eyes of the world.

=== The Helen trilogy ===
- Fever Dream (2010) (Book One) – Pendergast inadvertently discovers evidence that his wife Helen's death twelve years previously was not the accident that he had believed it to be. He and D'Agosta follow the trail of evidence from the plains of Africa to the Louisiana bayou, untangling a conspiracy as they go and discover startling truths about Helen's life.
- Cold Vengeance (2011) (Book Two) – The conspiracy that murdered his wife is no more, but Pendergast will not rest until every person involved is brought to justice. Chasing the final conspirator across the moors of Scotland, Pendergast stumbles into a greater danger than he ever knew existed: the Covenant ("Der Bund" in German), a network of Nazis and Nazi sympathisers that have retreated from public view to influence events on a global scale. Corrie Swanson, on her own, still a student at John Jay, helps uncover part of the conspiracy.
- Two Graves (2012) (Book Three) – Pendergast's bloodlust continues as he chases those responsible for the abduction of Helen, who was revealed to have been alive and well for the past twelve years at the climax of Cold Vengeance. But a new threat intrudes upon Pendergast's chase: a serial killer who holds New York City in the grip of terror. Pendergast learns that he has two 15-year old sons, twins, that Helen never spoke of.

=== Short stories ===
- "Extraction" (2009) – Pendergast tells the story of how Diogenes and he encountered a local urban legend as children, a man acting as the Tooth Fairy.
- "Gaslighted: Slappy the Ventriloquist Dummy vs. Aloysius Pendergast" (2014) (written with R. L. Stine) – Pendergast wakes up in Stony Mountain Sanatorium and confronts himself with a great dilemma: Is Slappy the Dummy part of his dream? Or is reality itself the dream of an insane man?

=== Proposed television adaptation ===
On February 1, 2016, authors Preston and Child confirmed that producer Gale Anne Hurd would be heading a television adaptation of the novels Relic and Cabinet of Curiosities. The adaptation, simply titled Pendergast, would air on Spike TV. The first season would focus on "Pendergast investigating a present-day crime mimicking a century-old mystery — that links to his own family's dark past."

On November 8, 2017 Douglas Preston and Lincoln Child posted on their Facebook page that the series, under development at Paramount, was cancelled.
