= Thunderhead (Preston and Child novel) =

Novel by Douglas Preston

- Softcover edition
- Author: Douglas Preston, Lincoln Child
- Language: English
- Genre: Thriller, Science fiction novel
- Publisher: Grand Central Publishing
- Publication date: July 1, 1999
- Publication place: United States
- Media type: Print, e-book, audiobook
- Pages: 496 pp. (Hardcover)
- ISBN: 0-446-60837-8
- OCLC: 44194046
- Preceded by: Riptide
- Followed by: The Ice Limit

Thunderhead is a thriller novel by American writers Douglas Preston and Lincoln Child. The book was published on July 1, 1999 by Grand Central Publishing.

== Plot synopsis ==
Anthropologist Nora Kelly finds a letter that was written sixteen years ago, but mysteriously sent to her only recently. The letter is written by her father, long believed dead. The letter states that he had found the lost city of gold, Quivira. Kelly organizes an expedition into a harsh, remote corner of Utah's canyon country. A portion of the team learns that the city of Quivira held not gold, but micaceous, golden colored pottery, and that it also was a center for an Aztec death cult, which had enslaved the native Anasazi people. The Aztec rulers used black magic, aided by a powder of the fungus Coccidioides immitis which could kill by causing coccidioidomycosis. Kelly's teammate, Sloane, attempts to kill Kelly to be the sole person who can claim the find, not suspecting what Kelly has learned about the fungal infection, and neither parties realizing until very late that they are being tracked by contemporary practitioners of the cult, who have enhanced their ability to stalk and fight with traditional hallucinogens such as psilocybin, mescaline, and datura.

== Background ==
The character of Nora Kelly is modeled on the amateur archaeologist and writer Nora Benjamin Kubie, grandmother of Lincoln Child.

== Continuity ==
Bill Smithback, the journalist hired to chronicle the expedition, previously appeared in Preston and Child's Aloysius Pendergast series, and is revealed to have achieved some level of fame based on his novelization of the events depicted in Relic and Reliquary. Nora Kelly later appears as a supporting character in the Pendergast series, starting with The Cabinet of Curiosities in 2002, and her final appearance being in Cemetery Dance in 2009. Then gets her own novel series starting with Old Bones in 2019.
