= Brimstone (Preston and Child novel) =

Novel by Douglas Preston and Lincoln Child

- Author: Douglas Preston, Lincoln Child
- Language: English
- Series: Diogenes Trilogy, Aloysius Pendergast
- Genre: Suspense
- Publisher: Warner Books
- Publication date: August 3, 2004
- Publication place: United States
- Media type: Print, e-book, audiobook
- Pages: 497 pp. (Hardcover)
- ISBN: 0-446-53143-X
- OCLC: 54279996
- Dewey Decimal: 813/.54 22
- LC Class: PS3566.R3982 B75 2004
- Preceded by: Still Life with Crows
- Followed by: Dance of Death

Brimstone is a thriller novel written by American authors Douglas Preston and Lincoln Child, and published on August 3, 2004, by Warner Books. This is the fifth installment in the Special Agent Pendergast series and the first novel in the Diogenes trilogy that also includes Dance of Death (2005) and The Book of the Dead (2006).

== Plot summary ==
FBI Special Agent Aloysius X.L. Pendergast and Sergeant Vincent D'Agosta, now working for the Southampton Police Department, investigate a series of unusual deaths—deaths that appear to be the work of Lucifer in return for pacts entered in with him by his victims. Their investigation takes them from the New York City area, site of the first two deaths, to Florence, Italy where they uncover the motive and method of the killers behind the strange and gruesome deaths. During the course of unraveling the mystery, the truth behind a priceless, missing Stradivarius violin is revealed and a potentially apocalyptic riot with Messianic Christians is averted. Pendergast also reveals details of his insane brother Diogenes, whom he believes is planning something horrible.

== Plot ==
Jeremy Grove, famous resident of the Hamptons, is found murdered in his home by his maid. There was a cloven hoof print burned into the floor at the foot of the bed. When the investigation begins, “Sergeant” D’Agosta of the Southampton police discovers Pendergast wandering the beach near the murder site.

D’Agosta went to Canada to write a book, but then ran out of money and had to go back to being a cop and couldn’t get a job in NYC. Apparently he left his wife, Lydia, back in Canada.

We meet Constance Greene, physically 19, but well over 100. She had revealed herself to Wren the previous summer during his cataloging of the Cabinet in 891 Riverside.

Nigel Cutforth, rich record producer and friend of Grove, cooks in his penthouse apartment. D’Agosta and Pendergast investigate, and the reader in reintroduced to Captain Laura Hayward, who worked with Pendergast in Reliquary.

Locke Bullard is aboard his yacht, and connects with a hitman named Vasquez, whom he hires for $2 million to kill Pendergast. Vinnie and Captain Hayward seem to be hitting it off. Vinnie has met Constance and dines with her and Pendergast at the mansion at 891 Riverside.

D’Agosta asks Captain Hayward for a wiretap on Bullard’s phone. At first she says no, then they have sex in her office. She then says yes, but not because of the sex.

Everyone has been looking for Ranier Beckmann, including the murdered men. Now Pendergast has his current whereabouts. Pendergast has located Beckmann's grave in a Yonkers cemetery (with the help of Mime). He calls in the police to exhume the body.

Bullard is traveling to Italy to retrieve something his company was building as he is canceling the project. Also, a meeting that his executive had in NY went sideways, with Pendergast finding out about it through a wiretap.

The body of Beckmann leads Pendergast and D’Agosta to Florence, where they believe Bullard is also heading. D’Agosta hopes the trip won’t mess up his burgeoning relationship with Hayward.

The night before they leave for Italy, Pendergast shows Vinnie a letter from his brother, Diogenes. The letter contains only a date, January 28 (91 days hence). Pendergast believes this is the date his brother will commit a terrible crime.

Bryce Harriman is on the case of the murders. He attends an ad-hoc gathering of the Reverend Buck, a born again ex-con that arrived in NYC one day earlier, because he read Harriman’s story in the Post. Bill Smithback is revealed to be on his honeymoon with Nora Kelly.

Bullard removes an item from his highly secure lab in Italy, and does a demonic summoning at his home, which used to belong to Machiavelli. He is found the next morning, burnt up like Jeremy Grove and Nigel Cutforth. Pendergast and D’Agosta try to penetrate Bullard’s security to visit his lab, but are caught by his security guards. After narrowly escaping, they then return and find Bullard’s corpse. Pendergast has a revelation: the item that Bullard placed into the pentagram was Stormcloud, a famous Stradivarius violin. The violin is missing from the crime scene.

Pendergast and D’Agosta track down the priest that gave confession to Beckmann. A hit man follows them to the Sanctuary of La Verna, where he shoots the priest. Before he dies, he says that Beckmann had made a deal with the devil, but that the priest was able to save his soul. Pendergast wonders, though, about the other 3 men.

Back in NY, Captain Grable and Captain Hayward attempt to arrest Reverend Buck, whose tent city has grown and is disturbing New Yorkers. But they are turned away, and now Buck knows what God’s plan for him is.

Pendergast and Vinny head to a cathedral where a person of interest, Vanni, is buried. He had been partially burned, then shot, and Pendergast wants to exhume the body, but official means would take too long. They find some melted metal in the body, leading to their theory that Vanni was a test case for the current killer, before he perfected his burning technique.

Pendergast and Vinny head to a Tuscan island, Capraia, to find Lady Viola Maskelene. She’s a beautiful woman, and Pendergast seems taken by her. She hands Pendergast a letter from Count Fosco, in which he invites Pendergast to a meeting, during which, Pendergast says, the count will try to kill him.

Pendergast declares that Count Fosco, who pretended to help and befriend Pendergast earlier, is the murderer, and that he has the Stormcloud violin.

Pendergast and D’Agosta meet the count at his castle. With Pendergast and D’Agosta in Castle Fosco, the count explains what happened. Thirty years ago, he’d met Beckmann, Bullard, Cuthbert, and Grove. He invited them to a midnight séance to raise the Devil—staged, of course. And then, much later, he discovered that Bullard had acquired the violin, and planned to destroy it so that he could analyze the resin, to help the Chinese develop missiles that could defeat American radar.

He used the other deaths to scare Bullard, convincing him that he must undo the deal he made with the Devil 30 years earlier, and that to do so he needed to sacrifice something of immense value.

They find out the count constructed a microwave device that killed his victims. He attempts to kill them, they escape the castle and are hunted like boars: dogs and men trapping them. Vinnie escapes, but it appears Pendergast does not. As he is escaping, D’Agosta spots Diogenes (though he doesn’t know who it is) observing.

Back in NYC, Hayward solves the problem of the lay priest, Reverend Buck, and ships him back to Oklahoma where he has an outstanding warrant for parole violation.

Fosco captures Pendergast and takes him down to the lowest sub-basement of his castle. He has him chained to the wall and bricks him up, leaving him to die. D’Agosta returns to the castle with Italian police officers. They search the castle, but find no signs of anything untoward—Fosco has covered up all evidence of wrongdoing. Finally, D’Agosta is forced to leave and the police are furious at him.

Later, Fosco is in his study having a drink. He retrieves Stormcloud and allows it to sit a bit before he plans to play it. But then he starts to feel strange. It is revealed D’Agosta has figured out how to use Fosco’s microwave device, and he uses it to exact justice on Fosco, killing him in the same manner that he killed the others. He sends the violin back to Viola and returns to New York.

Hayward mentions he can get his old job back, in a different precinct than hers of course, and there are hints they are moving in together.

In the novel's epilogue, someone goes down to the sub-basement where Pendergast is bricked up. He removes a few bricks, and as he peers in, we discover that the person peering in has different colored eyes: one blue, one hazel, thus revealing him to be Diogenes.

== References to other literary works ==
- The entombing of Pendergast in the catacombs under Fosco's home bears a deliberate literary allusion to the 1846 short story "The Cask of Amontillado" by Edgar Allan Poe. The dialogue when Pendergast futilely urges the Count to let him go because he has something important to do also has a strong resemblance to the Confrontation dialogue between Valjean and Javert in the hit musical Les Misérables.
- An alias D'Agosta uses on the telephone, Jack Torrance, is the name of the main character in The Shining, a 1977 novel by Stephen King.
- The character of Count Fosco is a tribute to the classic character of the same name, a villain in Wilkie Collins's 1860 novel The Woman in White.
- The character Count Fosco refers to there being all types of detectives including Navajo policemen, a subtle reference to Tony Hillerman's characters Joe Leaphorn and Jim Chee, two fictional Navajo policeman.
