= The Relic =

1997 monster horror film by Peter Hyams

- Theatrical release poster
- Directed by: Peter Hyams
- Screenplay by: Amy Holden Jones; John Raffo; Rick Jaffa Amanda Silver
- Based on: Relic by: Douglas Preston; Lincoln Child
- Produced by: Gale Anne Hurd; Sam Mercer
- Starring: Penelope Ann Miller; Tom Sizemore; Linda Hunt; James Whitmore
- Cinematography: Peter Hyams
- Edited by: Steven Kemper
- Music by: John Debney
- Production companies: Cloud Nine Entertainment; PolyGram Filmed Entertainment; Marubeni; Toho-Towa; Tele-München; BBC; Pacific Western Productions
- Distributed by: Paramount Pictures
- Release date: January 10, 1997
- Running time: 110 minutes
- Country: United States
- Language: English
- Budget: $40–60 million
- Box office: $48 million

The Relic is a 1997 American monster-horror film shot and directed by Peter Hyams and based on the best-selling 1995 novel Relic by Douglas Preston and Lincoln Child. The film stars Penelope Ann Miller, Tom Sizemore, Linda Hunt, James Whitmore, and Brian Steele in his feature film debut. In the film, a detective and a biologist try to defeat a fictional South American monstrous reptilian creature which is on a killing spree in the Field Museum of Natural History in Chicago.

The movie was shot in Chicago at the Field Museum of Natural History. Production was originally intended to be held at the American Museum of Natural History in New York City. However, a deal could not be reached and, after taking interest in the film's premise, the Field Museum offered to let the studio shoot there instead. The film was the second on-screen collaboration between Hunt, Miller, and supporting actor Chi Muoi Lo, all three of whom also worked on the film Kindergarten Cop.

The Relic was released in the United States on January 10, 1997, by Paramount Pictures. The film received mixed reviews from critics and was considered a box-office failure. It grossed only $48 million worldwide against a $40–60 million budget. The film was the final film appearance of actress Audra Lindley before her death shortly after the film's release.

== Plot ==
In Brazil, John Whitney, an anthropologist for the Field Museum of Natural History in Chicago, Illinois, studies a primitive tribe and drinks a soup made by the tribesmen. Shortly after, Whitney accosts a merchant ship captain, asking him to remove the cargo he had intended to send to Chicago from the ship. Unwilling to delay the ship's departure, the captain refuses, and Whitney sneaks aboard. Unable to find his cargo, he cries out.

Six weeks later, the ship arrives on Lake Michigan with its crew missing. Chicago PD homicide detective Lieutenant Vincent D'Agosta and his partner, Sergeant Hollingsworth, investigate the ship and find dozens of corpses in the bilge.

Another seven days later, Margo Green, an evolutionary biologist, arrives at work at the museum and discovers that co-worker Greg Lee is applying for the same research grant she is, after he had gotten one for himself already. After their arrival by air, Margo and her mentor, Albert Frock, examine Whitney's crates and find them empty, except for a bed of leaves and a stone statue of the "Kothoga", a mythical forest monster. Margo notices a fungus on the leaves and sends it for analysis; the remaining leaves are incinerated. That night, security guard Frederick Ford is killed like the ship's crew by an unseen creature. D'Agosta suspects a connection. Believing the killer is still inside the museum, he orders it closed until the police have finished searching. Ann Cuthbert, the museum director, protests and mentions a critical upcoming exhibition.

Margo discovers the fungus contains concentrated hormones found in several animal species. In the container of leaves, she finds a mutated beetle with insect and reptilian DNA, which had slipped into the container some time prior. Margo crushes the mutant to death with a heavy book. Ford's autopsy reveals that his hypothalamus was extracted from his brain, like the bodies from the ship. In the museum's basement, the police are startled by a mentally ill, homeless ex-convict and kill him. Finding Ford's wallet on him, and an identity tag from one of the crew of the ship, everyone assumes that the suspect is dead, and considers that the case closed. Despite this, D'Agosta remains skeptical, but Mayor Robert Owen and the museum's head of security, Tom Parkinson, force him to let the exhibition proceed.

D'Agosta orders a lockdown of all museum areas except the main exhibition hall on the night of the opening. Frock and Margo, trapped in the laboratory wing, continue working and discover that Ford's killer is after the hormones on the leaves. D'Agosta and several officers search the basement tunnels once again. They are attacked by the creature, killing K-9 Officer Bradley and a police dog. D'Agosta tells Hollingsworth to evacuate the museum, but it is too late. In the main hall, the headless body of a policeman falls into the crowd, causing panic. During the hysteria, the museum's alarms are tripped, and their security system goes haywire, trapping a small group of people inside. Two security guards try to restore the power but are killed by the still-unseen creature.

D'Agosta meets Margo and Frock in the lab, where the creature, now revealed to be the Kothoga, an enormous chimeric beast, attacks them; they close a steel door to stop it. Margo theorizes the fungus mutated a smaller creature, and Frock says that without the leaves to eat, the Kothoga instinctively seeks the closest substitute, human hypothalamus, until it runs out of targets and dies; he further postulates that the tribe knew of the fungus, and used it on a human or animal to deal with an external threat, then hid until the threat was neutralised and the Kothoga died of "starvation." Margo's computer then determines that the creature was originally human, not an animal. D'Agosta finds a radio and tells Hollingsworth to lead the museum guests via an old coal tunnel. Tom, Greg, and benefactors Mr. and Mrs. Blaisedale refuse to go, and CPD officer McNally stays behind to guard them; the Kothoga returns to the main hall and kills them and the S.W.A.T. officers who enter through the skylights.

Margo suggests using liquid nitrogen to kill the Kothoga, as it is part-reptilian and likely cold-blooded. While collecting the remaining leaves in the lab, Margo and D'Agosta discover Frock has been killed. In the sewers, D'Agosta uses the leaves to lure the Kothoga away from the coal tunnel, allowing the guests to escape, though CPD officer Bailey and a guest are both killed. However, liquid nitrogen doesn't affect the creature. Margo and D'Agosta flee. In the lab, her computer completes the analysis of the Kothoga's human DNA, revealing that the Kothoga is none other than John Whitney himself, who mutated after drinking the tribesmen's soup.

The Kothoga smashes into the lab through the ceiling, while D'Agosta is locked outside. It chases Margo, corners her, and suddenly hesitates, seemingly recognizing her. Margo starts an explosive fire that incinerates and finally blows the Kothoga to bits, surviving by hiding inside a maceration tank. As dawn comes, D'Agosta and a team of police break into the lab, find the charred remains of the Kothoga, and rescue Margo from the tank.

== Cast ==
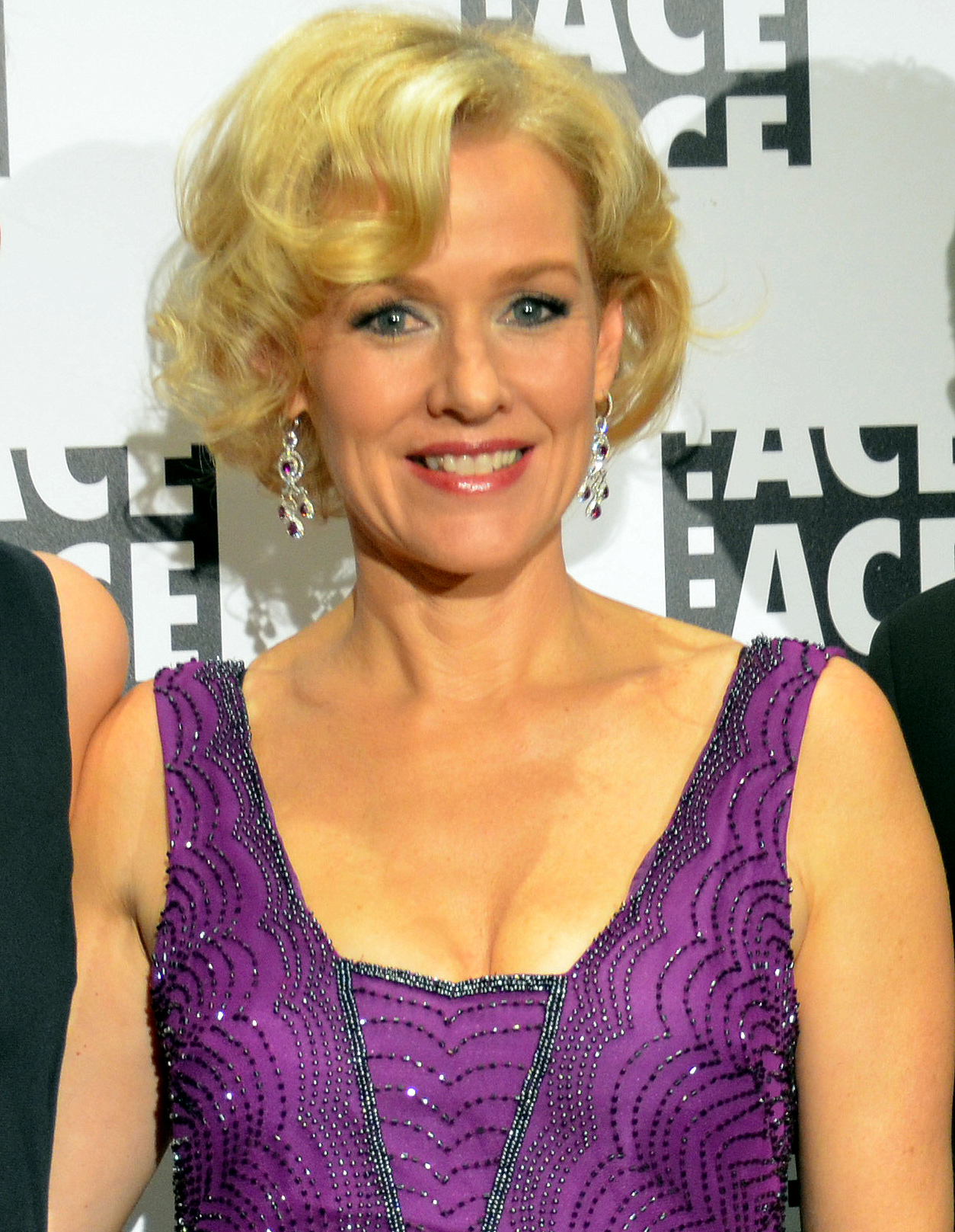
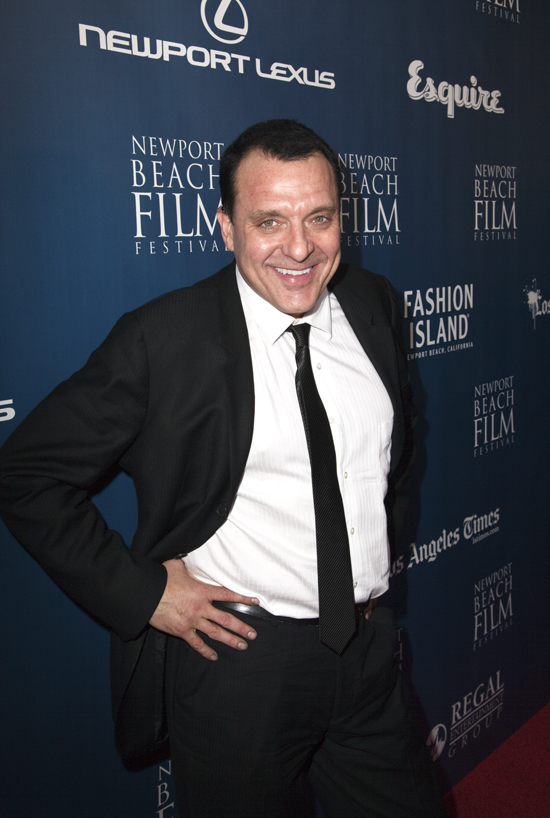
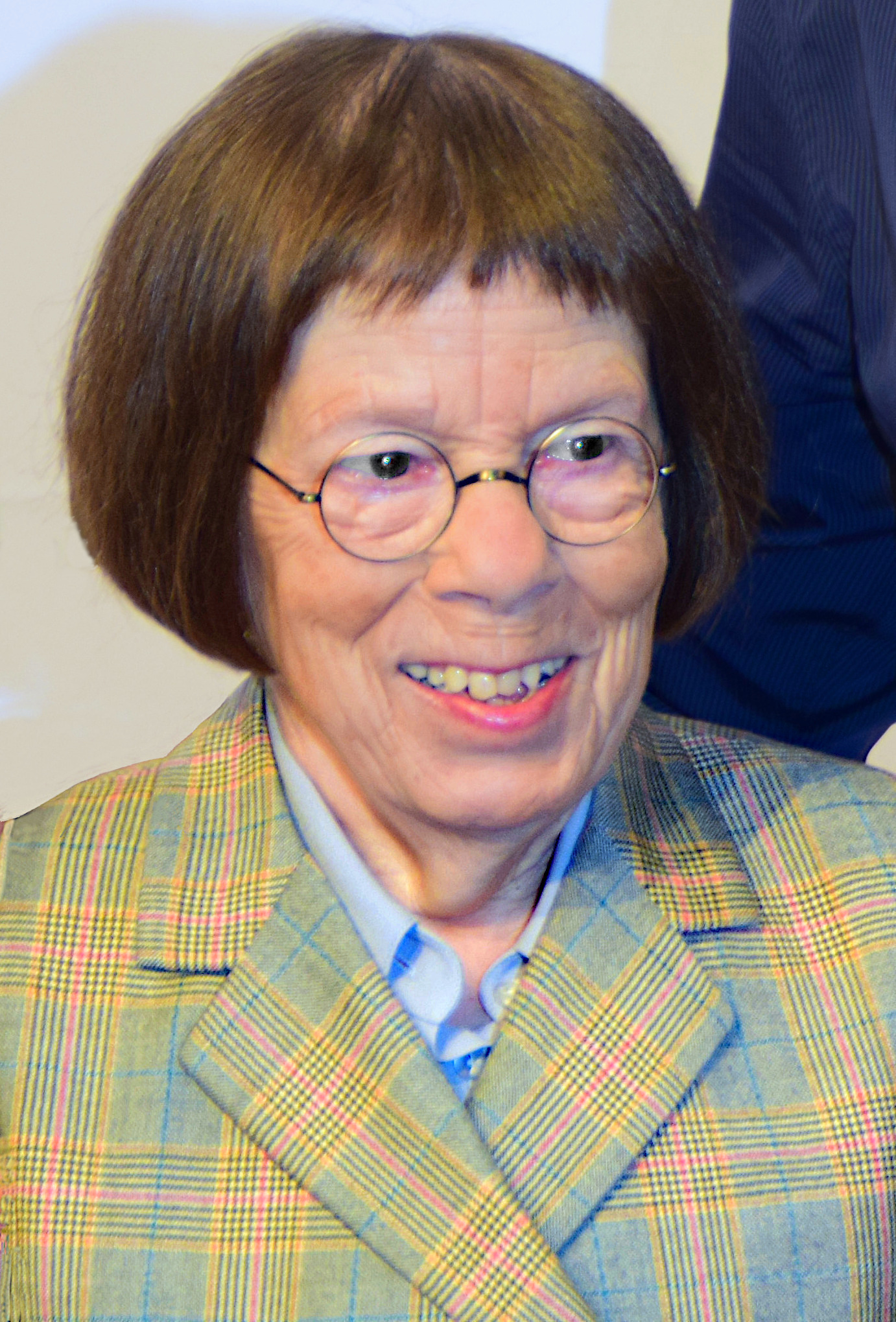
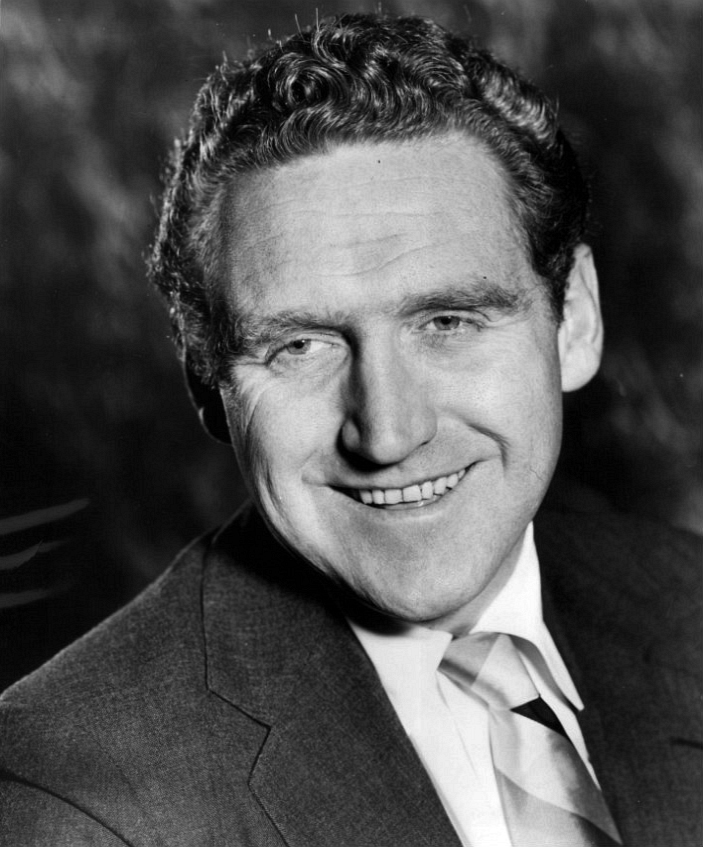
(Left to right) Penelope Ann Miller (2012), Tom Sizemore (2011), Linda Hunt (2015), and James Whitmore (1955).
- Penelope Ann Miller as Margo Green, museum evolutionary biologist
- Tom Sizemore as Chicago Police Department Lieutenant Vincent D'Agosta, Chicago police detective
- Linda Hunt as Ann Cuthbert, museum curator
- James Whitmore as Albert Frock, museum scientist and Margo's mentor
- Clayton Rohner as Sergeant Hollingsworth, junior police detective and D'Agosta's subordinate
- Chi Muoi Lo as Greg Lee, an ambitious museum scientist trying to apply the same research grant away from Margo.
- Thomas Ryan as Tom Parkinson, the museum's head of security
- Robert Lesser as Mayor Robert Owen
- Diane Robin as Mrs. Owen, Mayor Owen's wife
- Lewis Van Bergen as John Whitney, museum anthropologist who went missing after his expedition in South America. John Whitney transforms into the monstrous Kothoga after ingesting the mushrooms.
- Francis X. McCarthy as George Blaisedale, a wealthy museum benefactor
- Constance Towers as Carrie Blaisedale, Mr. Blaisedale's wife
- Audra Lindley as Dr. Zwiezic, medical examiner
- John Kapelos as McNally, Chicago Police officer
- Tico Wells as Bailey, Chicago Police officer
- Mike Bacarella as Bradley, Chicago Police K-9 officer
- Gene Davis as Martini, crime scene investigator
- John DiSanti as Wootton, museum security guard
- David Proval as Johnson, museum security guard
- Jophery Brown as Frederick Ford, museum security guard
- Lyn Alicia Henderson as Perri Masai, restoration technician
- Don Harvey as Spota
- Dave Graubart as Eugene, one of truant boys
- Roland Joshua Scott as Josh, one of truant boys
- Vincent Hammond and Brian Steele as the Kothoga, the fictional lizard like-monster mutated by fungus from South America
  - Gary A. Hecker as Kothoga's Vocalization

== Production ==
The Relic was based on the horror novel by Douglas Preston, an ex-journalist and former public relations director for the American Museum of Natural History in New York City, and Lincoln Child (though it omits their major character, FBI agent Pendergast).

It was developed by Frank Marshall and Kathleen Kennedy.

The director, Peter Hyams, commented "I don't think you can scare people, unless you involve them." and "A movie like this has to be intelligent."

Because the novel portrayed the museum's administration in an unflattering light, they turned the film's producers down. Paramount Pictures offered the museum a seven-figure sum of money to film there, but the administration was worried that the monster movie would scare kids away from the museum. The producers were faced with a problem as only museums in Chicago and Washington, D.C., resembled the one in New York. The Field Museum of Natural History in Chicago loved the premise and allowed them to shoot there.

Penelope Ann Miller had not done a horror film prior to The Relic but was drawn to director Peter Hyams' desire to have a strong, smart female lead. Tom Sizemore was attracted to the film because he got to play the male lead: "I had the responsibility of pushing the narrative forward."

Makeup artist Stan Winston and his team made three creatures with two people moving the heads and people on the side working the electronics to move the arms, claws, mouth, and so on. Hyams reviewed Winston's early drawings and his only suggestion was to make the monster more hideous looking. The director also suggested certain invertebrates for inspiration and Winston came up with an arachnoid outline for the monster's face. In the scenes where the creature is running or jumping, a computer-generated version was used.

In addition to shooting on location in Chicago, a set was built in LA of a tunnel flooded with water. Sizemore spent most of the shoot either damp, cold or soaking wet and, as a result, caught the flu twice. The production was shut down briefly when Hyams became too sick to work.

== Music ==
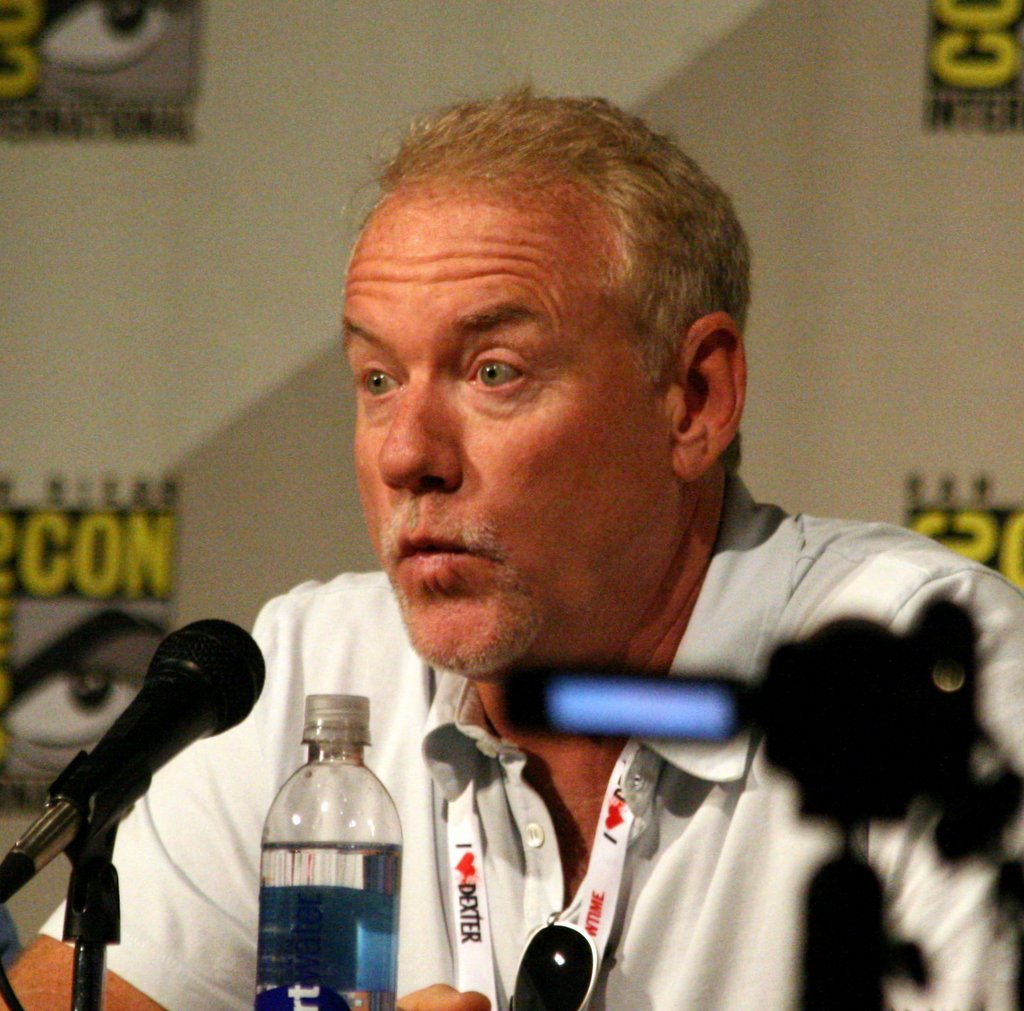
John Debney in 2013

The score was composed and conducted by John Debney. The soundtrack was released in January 1997 and an expanded, remastered Limited Edition CD (2,000 copies) by La-La Land Records, featuring over 62 minutes of music and bonus tracks, released on January 15, 2013.

== Release ==
=== Box Office ===
The Relic was a box office flop and premiered on January 10, 1997. It opened #1 at the box office, grossing $9,064,143 its opening week and a total of $33,956,608 in the US, against an estimated cost $60 million.

=== Home Media ===
The Relic was released on VHS and LaserDisc by Paramount Home Video on July 15, 1997. On April 20, 1999, Paramount Home Video released the film on DVD-Video. The Relic was released on Blu-ray on April 6, 2010.

== Reception ==
On review aggregator Rotten Tomatoes, The Relic holds an approval rating of 39%, based on 33 reviews, with the consensus: "Fleeting moments of brainless monster mayhem aside, The Relic proves to be too predictably derivative for its own good." On Metacritic, the film has a weighted average score of 55 out of 100, based on 14 critics, indicating "mixed or average reviews". Audiences polled by CinemaScore gave the film an average grade of "B−" on an A+ to F scale.

James Berardinelli of ReelViews said that "when all is said and done, this horror/science fiction amalgamation seems like nothing more ambitious than a bad reworking of elements from Aliens, Species, Jaws and Predator."

Positive reviews came from critics Roger Ebert and Gene Siskel; Siskel described the film as "surprisingly entertaining", and Ebert said that the film was clever in how it "combines the conventions of the horror and disaster genres" and "is actually a lot of fun, if you like special effects and gore."

Film historian Leonard Maltin gave the movie 2.5 out of a possible 4 stars, summing it up as "Alien in a museum".

Peter Stack of the San Francisco Chronicle gave the film a mixed review, stating, "'The Relic' will quickly fade to video, where it might fare well as a bump-in-the-night benefiting from the fast-forward button."

Russell Smith of The Austin Chronicle gave the film a 2.5/5 stating, "Long story short: This film stands as a near-perfect specimen of two hardy cinema archetypes – the cheesy but diverting creature feature and the weekend bargain matinee."

In a more negative review, Richard Harrington of The Washington Post stated, "It's a familiar story in the horror film business: good novel, terrible adaptation (just ask Stephen King and Clive Barker). As written by Douglas Preston and Lincoln Child, "The Relic" deserved to be taken off the shelf; as adapted by a quartet of screenwriters and directed by Peter Hyams, it should have been left on one."

Despite the negative reviews, the film gained a strong following. Lead actress, Penelope Ann Miller is fond of the film: "It had a lot of things in it that were definitely out there. But it was a good scary movie."

The film was nominated for multiple science-fiction and fantasy awards, including best horror film and best actress (for Penelope Ann Miller) at the 1997 Saturn Awards.

== See also ==
- Altered States
