= Crimson Shore =

2015 novel by Douglas Preston

- Hardcover first edition
- Author: Douglas Preston; Lincoln Child
- Language: English
- Series: Pendergast
- Genre: Thriller
- Publisher: Grand Central Publishing
- Publication date: November 10, 2015
- Publication place: United States
- Media type: Print
- Pages: 368
- ISBN: 978-1-4555-3626-9
- Preceded by: Blue Labyrinth
- Followed by: The Obsidian Chamber

Crimson Shore is a thriller novel by Douglas Preston and Lincoln Child, published on November 10, 2015, by Grand Central. It is the fifteenth book in the Special Agent Pendergast series.

== Plot ==
Special Agent Aloysius Pendergast is approached by Percival Lake, a sculptor who wishes to hire him as a private investigator. On returning from vacation to his home in Exmouth, Massachusetts, Lake discovered that thieves had stolen his wine collection from the cellar of the lighthouse he calls his home. Frustrated by the local police, he wishes to hire Pendergast to investigate. Lured by the promise of a rare bottle of wine as payment, Pendergast and his ward Constance Greene accept the job.

While examining the wine cellar, Pendergast discovers an alcove that has been concealed which contains manacles and fragments of human bone. An analysis of the bone reveals that it dates back to the 1840s and Pendergast concludes that it belongs to the captain of the Pembroke Castle, a ship that disappeared without a trace off the coast of Exmouth. However, their inquiry is interrupted by the murder of Morris McCool, an historian looking into local legends. Arcane symbols are carved into his body, as is the word "Tybane". Pendergast and Greene learn that local lore tells stories of a group of genuine witches who fled Salem after the witch trials and settled in the wetlands outside Exmouth. Pendergast dismisses this as superstition, believing that McCool's killer is playing to the locals' fears. A second body, that of local lawyer Dana Dunwoody, is found shortly thereafter.

By retracing McCool's work, Pendergast learns that the Pembroke Castle was carrying twenty-one flawless rubies known as the "Pride of Africa". He concludes that the eruption of Krakatoa in 1883, an event felt around the world—meant that the Exmouth whaling industry fell on hard times. In their desperation, the whalers extinguished the lighthouse and lit a bonfire to lead the Pembroke Castle to run aground in the hopes of looting it. When no riches were found, the whalers slaughtered the passengers and crew and locked the captain in the lighthouse cellar. Sworn to secrecy about the rubies, the captain swallowed them where they were forgotten until McCool inadvertently uncovered their existence. This leads Pendergast to Dana Dunwoody and his brother Joe who manipulated their illegitimate brother Dunkan, a transient living in the swamp, into killing McCool. Dunkan then killed Dana when Dana did not pay him as promised.

With Joe and Dunkan arrested, Pendergast considers the case closed. Constance is unwilling to accept this as her research into the witches' coven has turned up some issues. She and Pendergast have a fight and Constance decides to carry on alone. As a storm closes in that night, several residents of Exmouth are slaughtered by a monstrous creature. Pendergast realizes that Constance's theory that the witches' coven survived is provable and that she is in danger.

Constance follows the coven's trail to Oldham, a village on a nearby island that was abandoned after a hurricane in 1938. She discovers a network of cisterns and tunnels under the island where the coven practice satanic rituals. The monster wreaking havoc in Exmouth is Morax, a man with a genetic mutation whose appearance is the product of selective breeding by the coven. Constance is met by Bradley Gavin, the Exmouth deputy chief of police, who reveals that a portion of the town were part of the coven. With Morax turning on the coven, Gavin is now its leader, and he plans to take Constance as his wife to consolidate his rule. Constance refuses and is saved by Morax, who has returned to Oldham. She escapes as Morax attacks and kills Gavin. Lost in the tunnels, she is met by Pendergast, who has followed her. Pendergast realizes that while the murders of McCool and Dunwoody threw the coven into a critical state as it risked their exposure, releasing Morax was not part of the plan; someone else is responsible. They meet Morax again as they escape the tunnels and the three fall into the ocean. Constance is washed ashore and saved by the arrival of a SWAT team responding to the massacre in Exmouth. Morax is swept out to sea and is presumed to have drowned and Pendergast disappears.

One month later, and with no sign of Pendergast, Constance decides to return to her life in the basement of Pendergast's New York mansion. Proctor, Pendergast's driver who is now charged with her care, objects, but Constance has made up her mind. An intruder breaks into the mansion and takes Proctor captive; Proctor recognizes him as someone Pendergast believed to be dead. The intruder injects him with sodium pentothal and Proctor falls unconscious.
