= The Obsidian Chamber =

Thriller novel - Special Agent Pendergast series

- Hardcover first edition
- Author: Douglas Preston; Lincoln Child
- Language: English
- Series: Pendergast
- Genre: Thriller
- Publisher: Grand Central Publishing
- Publication date: October 18, 2016
- Publication place: United States
- Media type: Print, e-book
- Pages: 416 pp.
- ISBN: 978-1455536917
- Preceded by: Crimson Shore
- Followed by: City of Endless Night

The Obsidian Chamber is a thriller novel by Douglas Preston and Lincoln Child. The book was released on October 18, 2016, by Grand Central Publishing and is the sixteenth book in the Special Agent Pendergast series.

== Plot ==
After the apparent death of Agent Pendergast in the previous novel, Constance Greene has returned to Riverside Drive, but Diogenes reappears and seems to kidnap Constance. Proctor pursues them by plane to Canada and Africa, and by car into the desert where he is stranded. As it turns out, the chase was merely a diversion. Constance is still grieving in the basement of Riverside Drive and is slowly seduced by Diogenes, while the surviving Agent Pendergast has been fished out of the sea by smugglers who want to use him to free a colleague from prison and plan to kill him afterwards.

Pendergast manages to free himself, and just as he is about to return, Constance gives in to Diogenes and follows him to his island. Diogenes tells her that the incident on the volcano changed him and he is now working on two things: reconstructing the potion that gave Constance such a long life, and making her happy. He even tells her he gave up killing, though in truth he seems to have no such inhibitions, as he is perfectly happy to kill some people in order to gain the last ingredient to the potion.

While Agent Pendergast tracks him down through his latest killings, the young women that helped Diogenes fake Constance's kidnapping follows him to the island, determined to kill Constance as she wants Diogenes for herself.

Meanwhile, Constance receives a declaration of love from Diogenes and explains to him that this was her revenge, making him fall in love with her and then leaving him. Her decision to leave is first hindered by a murderous attempt of her rival and then by the arrival of Pendergast and the FBI command units.

In the end, Pendergast decides to accept his responsibility in Diogenes's development, decides to let him live and go, and even convinces a good friend of his to let Diogenes escape. However, when Constance asks him to love her the way she wants him to, he declines and she leaves him to join her son in the far East.
