= Blue Labyrinth (novel) =

2014 book by Douglas Preston and Lincoln Child

- Hardcover first edition
- Author: Douglas Preston; Lincoln Child
- Language: English
- Series: Pendergast
- Genre: Thriller
- Publisher: Grand Central Publishing
- Publication date: November 11, 2014
- Publication place: United States
- Media type: Print, e-book, audiobook
- Pages: 416 pp.
- ISBN: 978-1455525898
- Preceded by: White Fire
- Followed by: Crimson Shore

Blue Labyrinth is a thriller novel by Douglas Preston and Lincoln Child. The book was released on November 11, 2014, by Grand Central Publishing. This is the fourteenth book in the Special Agent Pendergast series.

== Plot ==
When Alban's corpse, FBI Special Agent Aloysius Pendergast's twin son, is left bound on his New York City doorstep, Pendergast chases a black Town Car he believes is connected to the killing. The pursuit ends in a multi-car crash on the Henry Hudson Parkway. His chauffeur, Proctor, is injured, and the vehicle gets away. During an interview with Lieutenant Peter Angler of the NYPD, Pendergast learns the crime scene has been scrubbed of evidence.

To protect his family's secrets and keep police from tying Alban to the unsolved Hotel Killer case, Pendergast enlists a hacker named Mime to erase Alban's DNA records from the NYPD database. He also meets a CIA operative and says he had created Operation Wildfire, a secret program that tracked Alban. He does not know who killed his son or why.

Lieutenant Vincent D'Agosta examines the murder of Victor Marsala, a technician at the New York Museum of Natural History. During Alban's autopsy, a rare blue turquoise stone is found in his stomach. Pendergast takes the stone to museum mineralogist Dr. Paden, paying for a fast identification.

D'Agosta learns Marsala had worked with a visiting scientist. After Constance Greene encourages him to take another case, Pendergast joins the inquiry. He pressures department head Dr. Frisby into granting access to a skeleton Marsala had handled, believing it deserves closer examination.

Pendergast travels to the abandoned Golden Spider Mine near California's Salton Sea after receiving the mineral report. He determines the site was prepared as a trap. Disguised as a collectibles dealer, he questions a local squatter named Cayute, who describes recent secret activity and sells him a map. Pendergast concludes the mine's rear entrance opens into the animal garden of the abandoned Salton Fontainebleau resort.

Pendergast enters the resort but is attacked in a basement animal handling room. After subduing his opponent, he is overcome by lily-scented gas released from a ceiling vent. Before losing consciousness, he hears, "You have Alban to thank for this."

In New York, D'Agosta asks Dr. Margo Green to examine the skeleton. She identifies it as the remains of Ophelia Padgett, a nineteenth-century Caucasian woman rather than a Hottentot male. Pendergast later questions his attacker in the Indio jail, but the man refuses to speak. A composite sketch matches witness descriptions.

Using old newspapers, D'Agosta and Margo learn that Ophelia's husband had been acquitted of her 1889 murder because her body had never been found. They also determine she died after taking a patent medicine sold by Pendergast's great-great-grandfather, Hezekiah. They gather at Pendergast's mansion and determine that the museum murder, the attack in California, and the family's past are related.

Pendergast becomes ill from the gas used at the Salton Sea. He and D'Agosta return to California to question the attacker again. The prisoner speaks only of the smell of rotting lilies before taking his own life. Pendergast admits he has begun smelling the same flowers and is dying from exposure to Hezekiah's elixir.

Pendergast travels to Brazil, where a favela leader named Fábio tells him Alban had married after falling in love and had tried to atone after his pregnant wife was killed. Alban later traveled to Switzerland and New York. Pendergast then visits his other son, Tristram, at a Swiss sanatorium, where Tristram says Alban had asked for forgiveness.

Pendergast remembers Alban's grief and desire for retaliation, changing his view of his son. D'Agosta's team identifies the attacker as Howard Rudd, a missing man from Indiana.

Lieutenant Angler tracks Alban's movements to Red Mountain Industries in Adirondack, New York. He confronts CEO John Barbeaux but is killed by his partner, Sergeant Loomis Slade, who is secretly working for Barbeaux. Barbeaux admits killing Alban after Alban tried to stop his plan to avenge his son's death from an epigenetic curse tied to Hezekiah's elixir.

When Slade reports that Pendergast's group intends to find a cure, Barbeaux sends his operatives after them. As Pendergast nears death, Constance searches the mansion's sub-basement and finds Hezekiah's journal containing the formula for an antidote called Et Contra Arcanum.

A note written by Pendergast's great-uncle, Enoch Leng, identifies an error in the formula. Margo concludes that boiling the ingredients ruined the mixture. The group decides to obtain two rare plants: Hodgson's Sorrow from the Brooklyn Botanic Garden and the extinct Thismia americana from the museum vault.

D'Agosta finds a listening device and realizes Slade has been secretly reporting to Barbeaux. At the museum, Margo retrieves the Thismia specimen but is stopped by Dr. Frisby, whom Slade kills. Margo kills Slade by knocking a Tyrannosaurus rex skull onto him.

At the Brooklyn Botanic Garden, Barbeaux and his men attack Constance. Pendergast distracts them, allowing her to escape. Using flasks of triflic acid from Leng's collection, Constance kills Barbeaux's mercenaries and tricks Barbeaux into a pool of acid, killing him.

Emergency responders arrive as Pendergast suffers cardiac arrest. At the hospital, he is declared dead, but Margo administers the antidote while Constance keeps the medical staff at gunpoint. Pendergast is revived.

Two months later, Pendergast is in Louisiana with Constance, completing the sale of his ancestral plantation, Penumbra. He says he is giving up property acquired through Hezekiah's wealth and using the money to establish a charitable foundation. He keeps the assets inherited from Enoch Leng, remarking, "I prefer hypocrisy to poverty."

After removing the darkest part of his family's legacy, Pendergast and Constance leave in a 1954 Porsche Spyder that had belonged to his late wife, Helen.

== Reception ==
The Washington Post said the book was "sophisticated," but had "the most convoluted plot [they've] ever encountered." Publishers Weekly negatively compared the book to previous books in the series, and said that it "suffers from unimaginative explanations for the two crimes." Kirkus Reviews positively reviewed the book, calling it "Great character-driven crime fiction."
