= Beyond the Ice Limit =

2016 novel

First edition (publ. Grand Central Publishing)

Beyond The Ice Limit is a techno-thriller novel by American authors Douglas Preston and Lincoln Child. The book is a sequel to their 2000 book The Ice Limit and was published on May 17, 2016 by Grand Central Publishing. It is the fourth book in Preston and Child's Gideon Crew series.

== Plot ==
Five years before the events of the book, master engineer Eli Glinn led a team to retrieve a massive meteorite from Chile. The combination of a storm, an attack by a rogue Chilean naval captain, and the meteorite's strange behavior itself led to their ship's destruction in Antarctic waters, sending the meteorite to the ocean floor. Its strange behavior led some of the team to conclude it was a spore for an alien lifeform (the panspermia theory).

Having barely survived and miraculously recovered, Glinn recruits a team including master thief and nuclear physicist Gideon Crew to seek and destroy this lifeform. Traveling to the site of the previous sinking, the team discovers that the "spore" has sprouted into a massive structure that they nickname the Baobab, simultaneously reaching toward the ocean surface and burrowing through the earth. Glinn concludes that because of the spore's extreme density, the only way it could be launched into space is through the destruction of a planet; the Baobab appears to be literally tearing the planet apart.

Crew begins a love affair with a scientist named Alex Lispenard, but it is tragically cut short when the Baobab absorbs her mini-submersible; Crew hears her mysteriously speak through the Baobab shortly after her death. Inspecting the wreckage later, the team's doctor discovers that it has taken only her brain. The team also detects what seems to be whale song from the creature, which they roughly translate as saying "Kill Me." Having previously detected a brain-like structure in Baobab, the team concludes that the structure somehow keeps alive and uses the brains of alien forms to guide its growth, which are then launched into space as new "spores" to infect new planets.

With another mini-submersible, Crew brings a sample of the Baobab on board for analysis, but this plan goes awry when pieces of the material break off and burrow into the brains of team members, making them serve the Baobab's purposes. Glinn and Crew, now joined by meteorite hunter Sam McFarlane from the previous novel, race against time to destroy the Baobab with a nuclear warhead before the entire team is enslaved by the Baobab's "worms." Crew, who is dying, is selected for the suicide mission, but is miraculously saved by the impact of another submersible piloted by a mind-controlled scientist. The warhead detonates and destroys the Baobab, killing all those already infected with worms but sparing the uninfected. The novel concludes with the team listening to a farewell message from the alien brain originally imprisoned within the Baobab, a song of unearthly beauty.

== Release details ==
- Preston, Douglas; Child, Lincoln (2016). Beyond the Ice Limit: A Gideon Crew Novel (Gideon Crew series). Hachette Book Group. ISBN 9781455525874.

== Reception ==
The Associated Press wrote of the book that "Preston & Child take all of the various elements from classic horror and sci-fi films and novels and spin them together to write what begins as an action adventure, but soon delves into paranoid terror. Readers who enjoyed The Ice Limit will love this follow-up, and those unfamiliar with the original novel will have no problem with this story or the situations. Beyond the Ice Limit is a lot of scary good fun." Kirkus Reviews called it "relentless mayhem, another thrill-a-minute read" but criticized the "less than memorable supporting cast." The New York Journal of Books wrote that "no writing team equals Douglas Preston and Lincoln Child at creating a spine-chilling, page-turning suspense story" and offered "[k]udos to Preston and Child for another story that will keep the reader up past bedtime." Publishers Weekly wrote, "The bestselling authors maintain suspense throughout, and they throw in some original ideas that offset some familiar action tropes." Jacqueline Cutler of NJ.com wrote, "Preston & Child are incredibly smart writers; technically they are perfect. There's never an errant word or situation. It moves fast but with purpose and you know that everything is precisely researched from the shifts in the ocean currents to the plutonium in a bomb."
