= Gideon's Sword =

2011 novel

- Hardcover edition
- Author: Douglas Preston, Lincoln Child
- Language: English
- Series: Gideon Crew
- Genre: Thriller, Science fiction
- Publisher: Grand Central Publishing
- Publication date: February 22, 2011
- Publication place: United States
- Media type: Print, e-book, audiobook
- Pages: 342 pp.
- ISBN: 978-0-446-56432-8
- Preceded by: Fever Dream
- Followed by: Gideon's Corpse

Gideon's Sword is a novel by Douglas Preston and Lincoln Child. It was released on February 22, 2011 by Grand Central Publishing. The book is the first installment in the Gideon Crew series.

== Film adaptation ==
In May 2010, it was announced that a film based on the novel would be produced by Michael Bay and Paramount Pictures and written by Chap Taylor.
