= Verses for the Dead =

2018 mystery novel by Douglas Preston and Lincoln Child

- Author: Douglas Preston & Lincoln Child
- Language: English
- Series: Special Agent Pendergast
- Genre: mystery
- Publisher: Grand Central Publishing
- Publication date: December 31, 2018
- Publication place: United States
- Pages: 352
- ISBN: 978-1-5387-4720-9
- Preceded by: City of Endless Night
- Followed by: Crooked River

Verses for the Dead is a 2018 mystery novel by Douglas Preston and Lincoln Child. This is the eighteenth book in the Special Agent Pendergast series. It tells the story of FBI special agent Aloysius Pendergast as he investigates a serial killer in Miami Beach.
