= Lincoln Child =

American writer (born 1957)

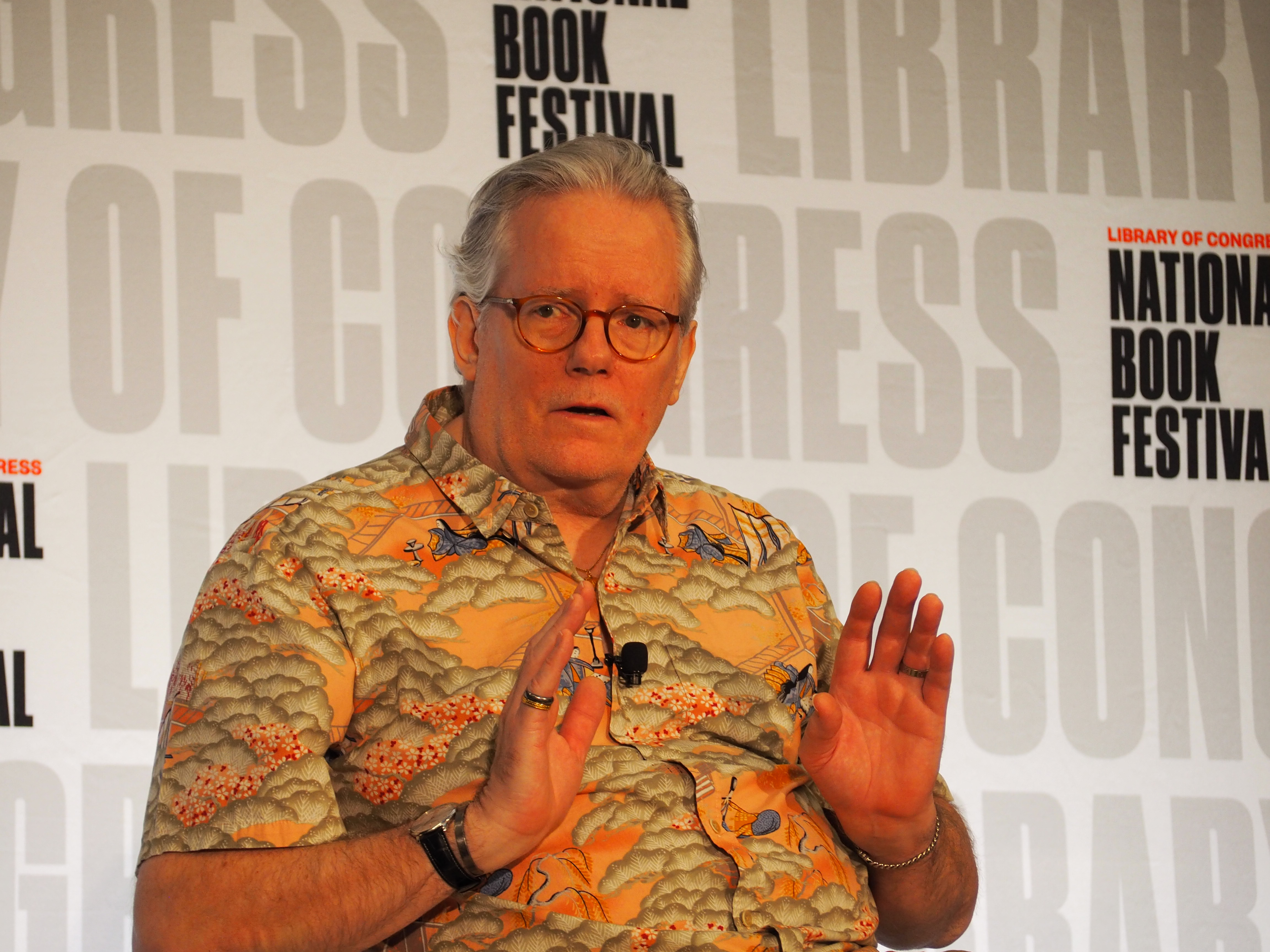
- Born: October 13, 1957 (age 68); Westport, Connecticut, U.S.
- Education: Carleton College
- Occupations: Novelist, editor
- Writing career
- Genres: Thriller, Techno-thriller, Adventure
- Notable works: Agent Pendergast series, Jeremy Logan series, Gideon Crew series
- Website: www.prestonchild.com

Lincoln Child (born October 13, 1957) is an American author of techno-thriller and horror novels. Though he is most well known for his collaborations with Douglas Preston (including the Agent Pendergast series and the Gideon Crew series, among others), he has also written eight solo novels, including the Jeremy Logan series. Over twenty of the collaborative novels and most of his solo novels have become New York Times bestsellers, some reaching the #1 position. Child and Preston's first novel together, Relic, was adapted into a feature film. Their books are notable for their thorough research and scientific accuracy.

== Life and career ==
Born in Westport, Connecticut, but now a Florida resident, Child graduated from Carleton College in Northfield, Minnesota, with a major in English.

Soon afterward, in 1979, he secured a job as an editorial assistant at St. Martin's Press. By 1984, Child had become full editor. While in this position, he edited hundreds of books, most titles being American and English fiction.

In 1987, after founding the company's mass-market horror division, Child left the St. Martin's Press to become a systems analyst at MetLife. Child's first novel (co-written with Preston), Relic, was published in 1995. He left the company a few years later to write full-time.

In 2002, Child began his solo career with the debut novel Utopia, then wrote Death Match in 2004. These two novels were stand-alone works that introduced a new set of characters each time. However, with Deep Storm in 2007, Child introduced the character of Dr. Jeremy Logan, a Yale professor of medieval history and enigmalogist, whose role over the course of the series gradually increases with each book. He appeared in only one chapter in Deep Storm, then became a supporting character in Terminal Freeze (2009), before finally becoming the main protagonist in The Third Gate (2012). Utopia, Deep Storm, and Terminal Freeze all went on to become New York Times best sellers.

Child is now a resident of Sarasota, Florida.

== Published works ==
=== Solo works ===
==== Stand-alone novels ====
- Utopia (2002)
- Death Match (2004)

==== Jeremy Logan series ====
- Deep Storm (2007)
- Terminal Freeze (2009)
- The Third Gate (2012)
- The Forgotten Room (2015)
- Full Wolf Moon (2017)
- Chrysalis (2022)

=== Collaborations with Douglas Preston ===
==== Agent Pendergast series ====
- Relic (1995)
- Reliquary (1997)
- The Cabinet of Curiosities (2002)
- Still Life with Crows (2003)
- Diogenes Trilogy
  - Brimstone (2004)
  - Dance of Death (2005)
  - The Book of the Dead (2006)
- The Wheel of Darkness (2007)
- Cemetery Dance (2009)
- Helen Trilogy
  - Fever Dream (2010)
  - Cold Vengeance (2011)
  - Two Graves (2012)
- White Fire (2013)
- Blue Labyrinth (2014)
- Crimson Shore (2015)
- The Obsidian Chamber (2016)
- City of Endless Night (2018)
- Verses for the Dead (2018)
- The Strange Case of Monsieur Bertin(2019)
- Crooked River (2020)
- Bloodless (2021)
- The Cabinet of Dr. Leng (2023)
- Angel of Vengeance (2024)
- Pendergast: The Beginning (2026)

==== Gideon Crew series ====
- Gideon's Sword (2011)
- Gideon's Corpse (2012)
- The Lost Island (2014)
- Beyond the Ice Limit (2016)
- The Pharaoh Key (2018)

==== Nora Kelly series ====
- Old Bones (2019)
- " Storm" (2020)
- The Scorpion's Tail (2021)
- Diablo Mesa (2022)
- Dead Mountain (2023)
- Badlands (2025)

==== Other ====
- Mount Dragon (1996)
- Riptide (1998)
- Thunderhead (1999)
- The Ice Limit (2000)

=== Short stories ===
- "Gone Fishing" from Thriller: Stories to Keep You Up All Night (2006)
- "Extraction" [eBook] (2012)
- "Gaslighted: Slappy the Ventriloquist Dummy vs. Aloysius Pendergast" [eBook] (2014)

== Awards ==
Save for one solo literary venture, Child's award nominations have all come from work in partnership with Douglas Preston.

Work	Year & Award	Category	Result	Ref.
The Ice Limit (with Douglas Preston)	2003 Evergreen Book Award		Nominated	
Still Life with Crows (with Douglas Preston)	2004 Audie Awards	Science Fiction	Nominated	
Brimstone (with Douglas Preston)	2005 Audie Awards	Mystery	Nominated	
Brimstone (with Douglas Preston)	2005 Audie Awards	Science Fiction	Nominated	
White Fire (with Douglas Preston)	2014 Killer Nashville Awards	Silver Falchion Award (Crime Thriller)	Finalist	
White Fire (with Douglas Preston)	2014 International Thriller Writers Awards	Hardcover Novel	Nominated	
Blue Labyrinth (novel) (with Douglas Preston)	2016 Audie Awards	Thriller or Suspense	Nominated	
Crimson Shore (with Douglas Preston)	2017 Audie Awards	Mystery	Nominated	
Full Wolf Moon	2017 Goodreads Choice Awards	Horror	Nominated	
The Scorpion's Tail (with Douglas Preston)	2022 Killer Nashville Awards	Silver Falchion Award (Mystery)	Finalist	

== See also ==
- Vincent D'Agosta, another character from Child's novels
