= City of Endless Night =

Book by Douglas Preston and Lincoln Child

- Hardcover first edition
- Author: Douglas Preston; Lincoln Child
- Language: English
- Series: Pendergast
- Genre: Thriller
- Publisher: Grand Central Publishing
- Publication date: January 16, 2018
- Publication place: United States
- Media type: Print, e-book
- Pages: 368 pp.
- ISBN: 978-1455536948
- Preceded by: The Obsidian Chamber
- Followed by: Verses for the Dead

City of Endless Night is a thriller novel by Douglas Preston and Lincoln Child. The book was released on January 16, 2018, by Grand Central Publishing. This is the seventeenth book in the Special Agent Pendergast series.

== Reception ==
The book entered The New York Times Fiction Best Seller list on February 4, 2018. A reviewer of Kirkus Reviews wrote "One of the best in the series—tense and tightly wound, with death relentlessly circling, stalking, lurking behind every shadow". A reviewer of Publishers Weekly mentioned "Though the minimization of Pendergast’s complex backstory makes this entry more accessible to newcomers, the authors fail to generate their usual high level of suspense. The climax will strike fans as too familiar."
