= Douglas Preston =

American journalist and author (born 1956)

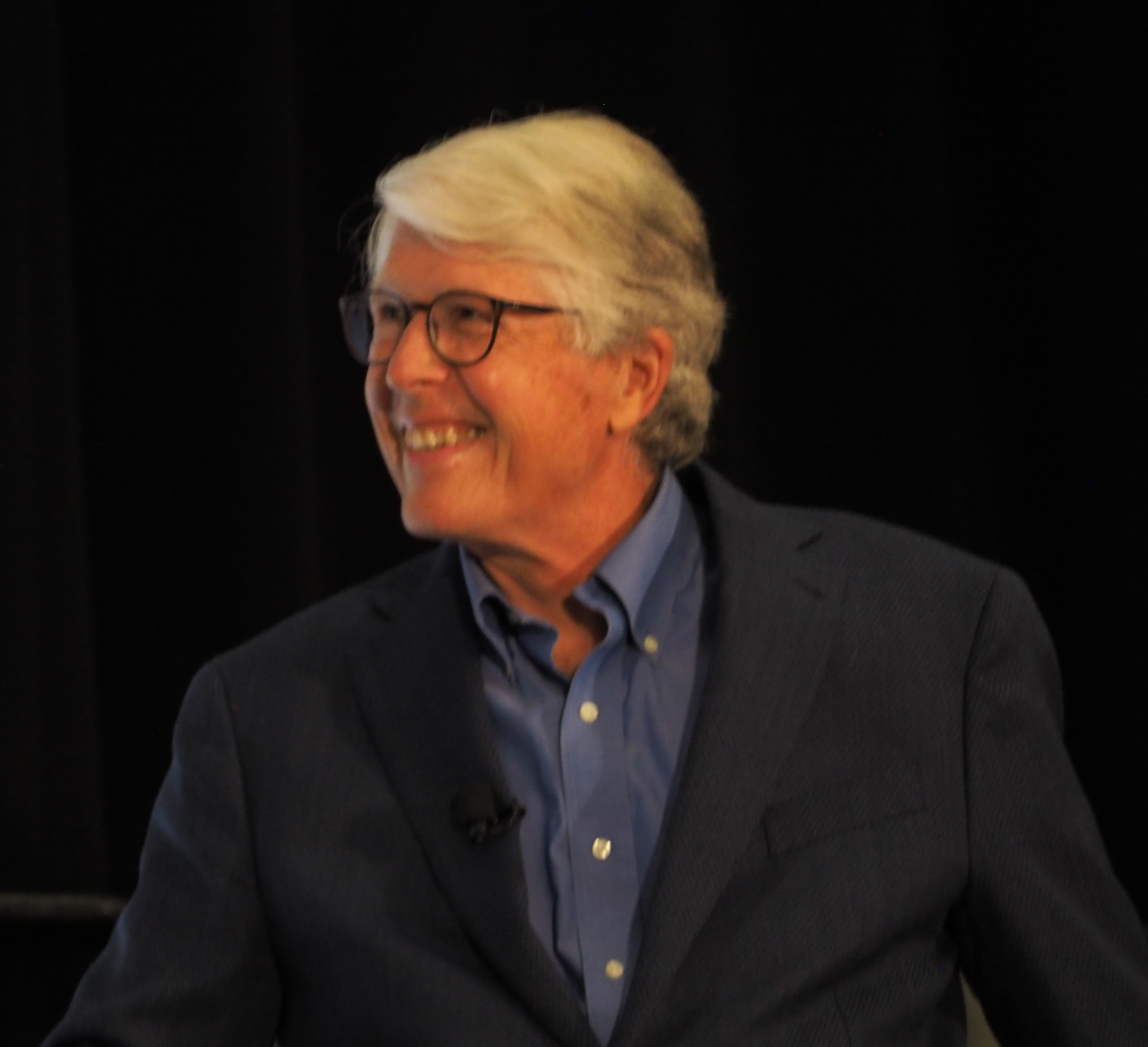
- Preston in 2024
- Born: Douglas Jerome Preston; May 20, 1956 (age 70); Cambridge, Massachusetts, U.S.
- Education: Pomona College
- Occupations: Novelist, journalist
- Spouse: Christine Preston
- Relatives: Richard Preston, David Preston
- Writing career
- Genres: Thriller, techno-thriller, adventure, nonfiction
- Notable works: Agent Pendergast Series, The Monster of Florence, Wyman Ford series, Gideon Crew series
- Website: www.prestonchild.com

Douglas Jerome Preston (born May 31, 1956) is an American journalist and author. Although he is best known for his thrillers in collaboration with Lincoln Child (including the Agent Pendergast series and Gideon Crew series), he has also written six solo novels, including the Wyman Ford series and a novel titled Jennie, which was made into a movie by Disney called The Jennie Project. Preston has authored a half-dozen nonfiction books on science and exploration and writes occasionally for The New Yorker, Smithsonian, and other magazines.

== Life and early career ==
Preston was born in Cambridge, Massachusetts and grew up in Wellesley, Massachusetts. A graduate of the Cambridge School of Weston in Weston, Massachusetts, and Pomona College in Claremont, California, Preston began his writing career at the American Museum of Natural History in New York.

From 1978 to 1985, Preston worked for the American Museum of Natural History as a writer, editor, and manager of publications. He served as managing editor for the journal Curator and was a columnist for Natural History magazine. In 1985 he published a history of the museum, Dinosaurs In The Attic: An Excursion into the American Museum of Natural History, which chronicled the explorers and expeditions of the museum's early days. The editor of that book at St. Martin's Press was his future writing partner, Lincoln Child. They soon collaborated on a thriller set in the museum titled Relic, published in 1995. It was subsequently made into a 1997 motion picture by Paramount Pictures starring Penelope Ann Miller, Tom Sizemore, and Linda Hunt.

In 1986, Preston moved to New Mexico and began to write full-time. Seeking an understanding of the first moment of contact between Europeans and Native Americans in America, he retraced on horseback Francisco Vásquez de Coronado's violent and unsuccessful search for the legendary Seven Cities of Gold. That thousand mile journey across the American Southwest resulted in the book Cities of Gold: A Journey Across the American Southwest. Since that time, Preston has undertaken many long horseback journeys retracing historic or prehistoric trails, for which he was inducted into the Long Riders' Guild. He has also participated in expeditions in other parts of the world, including a journey deep into Khmer Rouge-held territory in the Cambodian jungle with a small army of soldiers, to become the first Westerner to visit a lost Angkor temple. He was the first person in 3,000 years to enter an ancient Egyptian burial chamber in a tomb known as KV5 in the Valley of the Kings. Preston participated in an expedition that led to the discovery of an ancient city in an unexplored valley in the Mosquitia mountains of Eastern Honduras, which he chronicled in a nonfiction book, The Lost City of the Monkey God: A True Story. On that expedition he and other expedition members contracted a potentially lethal tropical disease known as cutaneous leishmaniasis, for which he received treatment at the National Institutes of Health. In 1989 and 1990 he taught nonfiction writing at Princeton University. He has been active in the International Thriller Writers organization.

== Writing career ==
With his frequent collaborator Lincoln Child, he created the character of FBI Special Agent Pendergast, who appears in many of their novels, including Relic, The Cabinet of Curiosities, Brimstone, and White Fire. Additional novels by the Preston and Child team include Mount Dragon, Riptide, Thunderhead, and The Ice Limit. Later, the duo created the Gideon Crew series, which consists of Gideon's Sword, Gideon's Corpse, and The Lost Island.

For his solo career, Preston's fictional debut was Jennie, a novel about a chimpanzee who is adopted by an American family. His next novel was The Codex, a treasure hunt novel with a style that was much closer to the thriller genre of his collaborations with Child. The Codex introduced the characters of Tom Broadbent and Sally Colorado. Tom and Sally return in Tyrannosaur Canyon, which also features the debut of Wyman Ford, an ex-CIA agent and (at the time) a monk-in-training. Following Tyrannosaur Canyon, Ford leaves the monastery where he is training, forms his own private investigation company, and replaces Broadbent as the main protagonist of Preston's solo works. Ford subsequently returns in Blasphemy, Impact, and The Kraken Project.

In addition to his collaborations with Child and his solo fictional universe, Preston has written several nonfiction books of his own, frequently about the history of the American Southwest. He has written about archaeology and paleontology for The New Yorker magazine and has also been published in Smithsonian, Harper's, The Atlantic, Natural History, and National Geographic.

In May, 2011, Pomona College conferred on Preston the degree of Doctor of Letters (Honoris Causa). He is the recipient of writing awards in the United States and Europe.

== Involvement in the "Monster of Florence" case ==
In 2000, Preston moved to Florence, Italy with his young family and became fascinated with an unsolved local murder mystery involving a serial killer nicknamed the "Monster of Florence". The case and his problems with the Italian authorities are the subject of his 2008 book The Monster of Florence, co-authored with Italian journalist Mario Spezi. The book spent three months on the New York Times bestseller list and won a number of journalism awards in Europe and the United States. In 2025, it was released as a Netflix miniseries.

== Involvement in the Amanda Knox case ==
Preston has criticized the conduct of Italian prosecutor Giuliano Mignini in the trial of American student Amanda Knox, one of three convicted, and eventually cleared, of the murder of British student Meredith Kercher in Perugia in 2007. In 2009, Preston argued on 48 Hours on CBS that the case against Knox was "based on lies, superstition, and crazy conspiracy theories." In December 2009, after the verdict had been announced, he described his own interrogation by Mignini on Anderson Cooper 360° on CNN. Preston said of Mignini, "this is a very abusive prosecutor. He makes up theories. He's ... obsessed with satanic sex." Preston published Trial By Fury: Internet Savagery and the Amanda Knox Case in 2013 as a Kindle Single eBook.

== "Operation Thriller" USO Tour ==
In 2010, Preston participated in the first USO tour sponsored by the International Thriller Writers organization, along with authors David Morrell, Steve Berry, Andy Harp, and James Rollins. After visiting with wounded soldiers and giving away books at National Navy Medical Center and Walter Reed Army Medical Center, the group spent over a week in Kuwait and Iraq, marking "the first time in the USO's 69-year history that authors visited a combat zone." Of the experience, Preston said, "As always, we learn a great deal from all of the amazing and dedicated people we meet."

== Authors United ==
In 2014, during a disagreement over terms between Hachette Book Group and Amazon.com, Inc., Preston initiated an effort which became known as Authors United. During the contract dispute, books by Hachette authors faced significant shipment delays, blocked availability, and reduced discounts on the Amazon website. Frustrated with tactics he felt unjustly injured authors who were caught in the middle, Preston began garnering the support of like-minded authors from a variety of publishers. In the first open letter from Authors United, over 900 signatories urged Amazon to resolve the dispute and end the policy of sanctions, while calling on readers to contact CEO Jeff Bezos to express their support of authors. Not long after, a second open letter, signed by over 1100 authors, was sent to Amazon's board of directors asking if they personally approved the policy of hindering the sale of certain books.

Describing the motivation behind the campaign, Preston explained: "This is about Amazon's bullying tactics against authors. Every time they run into difficulty negotiating with a publisher, they target authors' books for selective retaliation. The authors who were first were from university presses and small presses. Amazon is going to be negotiating with publishers forever. Are they really going to target authors every time they run into a problem with a publisher?"

== The Lost City of the Monkey God expedition ==
In 2015, Preston took part in an expedition into the Mosquitia mountains of Honduras. The expedition, led by Steve Elkins and sponsored by Benenson Productions, the Honduran government, and National Geographic magazine, explored a previously unknown pre-Columbian city built by people influenced by the Maya, but was not Maya itself. The city was discovered in an area long rumored to contain a legendary "lost city" known as La Ciudad Blanca, the White City, or the Lost City of the Monkey God. The archaeological site, in a remote valley, had been discovered in 2012 in an aerial overflight by a team using lidar (light detection and ranging), able to map the terrain under dense jungle.

The 2015 expedition explored and mapped the city's plazas, pyramids, and temples. It also discovered a cache of stone sculptures at the base of the city's central earthen pyramid. When excavated in 2016 and 2017, the cache revealed over 500 sacred objects which appeared to have been ceremonially broken and left as an offering at the time the city was abandoned. Preston wrote about that discovery in his 2017 nonfiction book, The Lost City of the Monkey God: A True Story, which became a No. 1 New York Times bestseller. Preston was one of many on the expedition who contracted an aggressive parasitic disease, called mucocutaneous leishmaniasis, in the lost city.

== Authors Guild ==
In 2019, he was elected President of the Authors Guild. In his capacity as president of the Authors Guild, Preston criticized the Internet Archive's National Emergency Library programme, launched in 2020 in response to the COVID-19 pandemic, which he described as "as though they looted a bookstore and started handing away books to passersby." Preston supported a lawsuit brought by publishers against the Internet Archive over the latter's collection of e-books.

== Published works ==
=== Novels ===
- Preston, Douglas (1994). Jennie. New York: St. Martin's Press.

==== Cash & Colcord novels ====
- Extinction (2024)
- Paradox (2026)

==== Tom Broadbent novels ====
- The Codex (2003)
- Tyrannosaur Canyon (2005) (this is also a Wyman Ford novel)

==== Wyman Ford novels ====
- Tyrannosaur Canyon (2005) (this is also a Tom Broadbent novel)
- Blasphemy (2008)
- Impact (2010)
- The Kraken Project (2014)

=== Collaborations with Lincoln Child ===
- Mount Dragon (1996)
- Riptide (1998)
- Thunderhead (1999)
- The Ice Limit (2000)

==== Agent Pendergast series ====
- Relic (1995)
- Reliquary (1997)
- The Cabinet of Curiosities (2002) *
- Still Life with Crows (2003)
- Diogenes Trilogy:
  - Brimstone (2004)
  - Dance of Death (2005)
  - The Book of the Dead (2006)
- The Wheel of Darkness (2007)
- Cemetery Dance (2009)
- Helen Trilogy:
  - Fever Dream (2010)
  - Cold Vengeance (2011)
  - Two Graves (2012)
- White Fire (2013)
- Blue Labyrinth (2014)
- Crimson Shore (2015)
- The Obsidian Chamber (2016)
- City of Endless Night (2018)
- Verses for the Dead (2018)
- Crooked River (2020)
- Bloodless (2021)
- The Cabinet of Dr. Leng (2023)
- Angel of Vengeance (2024)

==== Gideon Crew series ====
- Gideon's Sword (2011)
- Gideon's Corpse (2012)
- The Lost Island (2014)
- Beyond the Ice Limit (2016)
- The Pharaoh Key (2018)

==== Nora Kelly series ====
- Old Bones (2019)
- The Scorpion's Tail (2021)
- Diablo Mesa (2022)
- Dead Mountain (2023)
- Badlands (2025)
- Dead Man's Journey (2027)

==== Short fiction ====
- "Gone Fishing" from Thriller: Stories to Keep You Up All Night (2006)
- "Extraction" [eBook] (2012)
- "Gaslighted: Slappy the Ventriloquist Dummy vs. Aloysius Pendergast" from Faceoff (2014) [also released as an eBook] (2014)

=== Nonfiction ===
- Dinosaurs In the Attic: An Excursion into the American Museum of Natural History (1986)
- Cities of Gold: A Journey Across the American Southwest in Pursuit of Coronado (1992)
- Talking to the Ground: One Family's Journey on Horseback Across the Sacred Land of the Navajo (1996)
- The Royal Road: El Camino Real from Mexico City to Santa Fe (1998)
- Ribbons of Time: The Dalquest Research Site [photography by Walter W. Nelson, text by Preston] (2006)
- The Monster of Florence: A True Story [with Mario Spezi] (2008)
- Trial By Fury: Internet Savagery and the Amanda Knox Case [Kindle Single eBook] (2013). Collected in The Lost Tomb
- The Forgotten Killer [with John Douglas][Kindle eBook] (2014)
- The Lost City of the Monkey God (2017)
- The Lost Tomb: And Other Real-Life Stories of Bones, Burials, and Murder (2023)

==== Articles and essays ====
- Preston, Douglas (May 6, 2013). "The El Dorado machine : a new scanner's rain-forest discoveries". Our Far-Flung Correspondents. The New Yorker. Vol. 89, no. 12. pp. 34–40.
- Nelson, Walter W. (March 2014). The Black Place: Two Seasons. Museum of New Mexico Press. ISBN 978-0-89013-587-7. Includes an essay by Douglas Preston.
- Preston, Douglas (April 8, 2019). "The Day the Dinosaurs Died: A young paleontologist may have discovered a record of the most significant event in the history of life on Earth". Annals of the Former World. The New Yorker.
- Preston, Douglas (December 7, 2020). "The Skeletons at the Lake: Genetic analysis of human remains found in the Himalayas has raised baffling questions about who these people were and why they were there". Annals of Science. The New Yorker.

== Awards ==
Besides having been nominated for awards related to work with author Lincoln Child, Douglas Preston has also won or been nominated for awards relating to solo literary work.

| Work | Year & Award | Category | Result | Ref. |
|---|---|---|---|---|
| The Ice Limit (with Lincoln Child) | 2003 Evergreen Book Award | | Nominated | |
| Still Life with Crows (with Lincoln Child) | 2004 Audie Awards | Science Fiction | Nominated | |
| Brimstone (with Lincoln Child) | 2005 Audie Awards | Mystery | Nominated | |
| Brimstone (with Lincoln Child) | 2005 Audie Awards | Science Fiction | Nominated | |
| The Monster of Florence: A True Story (with Mario Spezi) | 2008 Black Quill Awards | Dark Genre Book of Non-Fiction - Editors' Choice | Won | |
| Impact | 2010 New England Book Festival | Science Fiction | Won | |
| White Fire (with Lincoln Child) | 2014 Killer Nashville Awards | Silver Falchion Award (Crime Thriller) | Finalist | |
| White Fire (with Lincoln Child) | 2014 International Thriller Writers Awards | Hardcover Novel | Nominated | |
| Blue Labyrinth (with Lincoln Child) | 2016 Audie Awards | Thriller or Suspense | Nominated | |
| Crimson Shore (with Lincoln Child) | 2017 Audie Awards | Mystery | Nominated | |
| The Lost City of the Monkey God | 2017 Goodreads Choice Awards | Non-Fiction | Nominated | |
| The Scorpion's Tail (with Lincoln Child) | 2022 Killer Nashville Awards | Silver Falchion Award - Mystery | Finalist | |
| Extinction | 2024 Goodreads Choice Awards | Science Fiction | Nominated | |
| The Lost Tomb: And Other Real-Life Stories of Bones, Burials, and Murder | 2024 Goodreads Choice Awards | History & Biography | Nominated | |

=== See also ===
- Aloysius Pendergast
- Vincent D'Agosta
- Wyman Ford
