= Gideon's Corpse =

2012 novel by Douglas Preston and Lincoln Child

- Hardcover edition
- Author: Douglas Preston, Lincoln Child
- Language: English
- Series: Gideon Crew
- Genre: Thriller
- Published: 2012 (Grand Central Publishing)
- Publication place: United States
- Media type: Print (hardcover and e-book)
- Pages: 368 pp.
- ISBN: 0446564370
- Preceded by: Gideon's Sword
- Followed by: The Lost Island

Gideon's Corpse is a thriller novel by Douglas Preston and Lincoln Child. The book was released on January 10, 2012, by Grand Central Publishing. The book centers around Gideon Crew and is a sequel to Gideon's Sword. The plot focuses on a nuclear scare, the federal reaction, and Gideon's attempts to unravel the mystery.

== Synopsis ==
The book begins immediately after the conclusion of Gideon's Sword. Eli Glinn does not seem displeased by Gideon's previous actions, and recruits Gideon to help calm down a colleague of Gideon's at Los Alamos National Laboratory, Reed Chalker, who has gone insane and has taken a family hostage. Chalker is spouting ravings that he has been irradiated by some conspiracy. In an event similar to the death of Gideon's father, Chalker is gunned down. During a search of his apartment, it is discovered that he is highly radioactive. It is determined that the cause of this was a botched attempt at assembling a dirty bomb. Chalker's hideout seems to have most of the tools necessary to create a nuclear bomb. It also has a map of DC, and a calendar indicating the bomb will detonate in ten day's time. Glinn assigns Gideon to help track down the bomb, and Gideon works with an FBI Agent named Stone Fordyce.

The pair of them go out west to Los Alamos, and try to check into Chalker's past. They interview Reed's ex-wife, now a member of a radical cult, his favorite novelist, Simon Blaine, and the members of Chalker's mosque. On their way to Chalker's writers workshop in California, the plane Fordyce is flying suffers a malfunction in both engines, forcing them to crashland. Fordyce comments how unlikely this is to happen by accident, and concludes it was the result of sabotage. Gideon is framed for being a terrorist- incriminating emails are placed on his work computer, and he is forced into hiding. His reluctant accomplice in this is Alida Blaine, Simon's daughter.

Gideon eventually comes to the conclusion that Simon is in on the conspiracy. Fordyce, convinced that Bill Novak—the Los Alamos Security Director—is corrupt, assists Gideon in breaking into Simon's computer as the two of them drive to DC. They discover that Blaine's true plan is to steal a vial of smallpox, with most of the security busy searching for an imaginary bomb. Gideon manages to save the vial, but Fordyce dies in the process, and Alida is horribly distraught. Gideon then confirms that he has only a year to live, as Glinn mentioned in the first book.

== Reception ==
Reception for Gideon's Corpse was mixed to positive. Kirkus Reviews wrote that the book was initially slow starting, but that the book eventually "zigzags like an out-of-control rocket toward a double-deceptive conclusion". Publishers Weekly panned Gideon's Corpse, saying that it fell "well short of the authors’ usual high standard".
