= Fever Dream (Preston and Child novel) =

Novel by Douglas Preston and Lincoln Child

- Hardcover edition
- Author: Douglas Preston; Lincoln Child
- Language: English
- Series: Pendergast
- Genre: Thriller
- Publisher: Grand Central Publishing
- Publication date: May 11, 2010
- Publication place: United States
- Media type: Print, e-book, audiobook
- Pages: 400 pp.
- ISBN: 0-446-55496-0
- Preceded by: Cemetery Dance
- Followed by: Cold Vengeance

Fever Dream is a novel by Douglas Preston and Lincoln Child. It was released on May 11, 2010 by Grand Central Publishing. This is the tenth book in the Special Agent Pendergast series and also the first in the Helen trilogy. The preceding novel is Cemetery Dance, and it is followed by Cold Vengeance.

== Plot ==
While visiting his family plantation in New Orleans, Special Agent Aloysius Pendergast inadvertently uncovers evidence that his wife Helen's death during an African safari was no accident. He enlists the help of his friend, police lieutenant Vincent D'Agosta, in his search for Helen's killer. Their investigation quickly betrays just how little Pendergast knew about his wife, as they uncover her fascination with John James Audubon, a local painter whose work in chronicling the wildlife of America became very influential.

Helen was searching for the Black Frame, a near-mythical painting made by Audubon when he was committed to a sanatorium. Pendergast and D'Agosta soon discover that Audubon's early work was particularly poor, and come to the conclusion that his sickness somehow triggered his artistic genius. However, their investigations have attracted the attentions of the same conspiracy responsible for Helen's murder, and when D'Agosta is put in mortal danger, Pendergast must turn to Captain Laura Hayward to venture deep into the Louisiana bayou and uncover the extent of the conspiracy.

Helen was a researcher on Project Aves, an attempt to create a drug that could enhance a person's latent genius by modifying a rare strain of avian influenza. The project ended in disaster when an infected bird escaped quarantine and infected a local family. Upon learning that no attempt to recover the bird was made so that Project Aves could have human test subjects, Helen planned to reveal the conspiracy to the world and was murdered for it.

Once in the bayou, Pendergast finds the man responsible for Helen's death: Charles J. Slade, her former employer and the director of Project Aves. Slade has isolated himself from the world after contracting the same strain of influenza that Audubon had. After using his newfound genius to find a cure for amyotrophic lateral sclerosis, he soon fell victim to the disease's side effects. The influenza destroyed his brain's ability to filter out sensations, leaving him trapped in a state of hyper-awareness. Every sensation is now as agonizing as it is overwhelming, pushing Slade further and further towards madness despite his efforts to manage the disease. Rather than killing him, Pendergast convinces Slade that killing himself is the only way he can escape the madness that will soon destroy the part of his brain that controls his sense of self. However, Slade refuses to reveal to Pendergast the name of the person who shot D'Agosta—Judson Esterhazy, Helen's brother.
