= White Fire (novel) =

Novel by Douglas Preston and Lincoln Child

- Hardcover first edition
- Author: Douglas Preston; Lincoln Child
- Language: English
- Series: Pendergast
- Genre: Thriller
- Publisher: Grand Central Publishing
- Publication date: November 12, 2013
- Publication place: United States
- Media type: Print, e-book, audiobook
- Pages: 384 pp.
- ISBN: 1-455-52583-9
- Preceded by: Two Graves
- Followed by: Blue Labyrinth

White Fire is a thriller novel by American writers Douglas Preston and Lincoln Child. It was released on November 12, 2013 by Grand Central Publishing. This is the thirteenth book in the Special Agent Pendergast series. The preceding novel is Two Graves.

== Plot ==
In 1889 at a London dinner, writer Oscar Wilde tells Dr. Arthur Conan Doyle a tale he heard in the Colorado mining camp of Roaring Fork about a man-eating grizzly bear. Wilde also suggests giving Sherlock Holmes a cocaine habit.

In the present day, Corrie Swanson, a student at John Jay College of Criminal Justice, has her thesis proposal rejected by her advisor, Professor Carbone. At the college archives, Corrie finds a copy of Doyle's diary mentioning the Roaring Fork tale. After learning that the victims' graves have been exhumed for a development project, she proposes a new thesis examining the remains. She gains Carbone's approval by blackmailing him over a past affair. Meanwhile, in France, Special Agent Aloysius Pendergast receives Corrie's letter describing the project but pays little attention.

In Roaring Fork, Corrie meets police intern Jenny Baker and receives permission from Chief Stanley Morris to examine the remains. At a storage shed inside the development known as The Heights, she inspects the skeleton of miner Emmett Bowdree and notices scrape marks and skull fractures that do not match a bear attack.

Her permission is soon withdrawn after pressure from Betty Brown Kermode, head of The Heights Association. Corrie confronts Kermode, who dismisses the research and threatens her with arrest. Believing the remains indicate a 150-year-old murder, Corrie breaks into the shed at night to collect evidence. She confirms that the bones show signs of murder and cannibalism but is caught by police and arrested. After five days in jail, she is offered a plea deal carrying a ten-year sentence.

Pendergast attends a town meeting and announces that he has located Captain Stacy Bowdree, a descendant of Emmett Bowdree. Using Colorado cemetery laws, he pressures Kermode, her brother-in-law Henry Montebello, the mayor, and Chief Morris into dropping all charges against Corrie.

That night, Jenny Baker and her family are killed in their mansion by a clown-masked arsonist. Corrie and Pendergast see the fire from their hotel. Fire investigator Larry Chivers calls it a robbery, but Pendergast concludes the killer is targeting wealthy residents and warns Chief Morris that more attacks are likely.

Corrie resumes examining the miners' remains and confirms cannibalism. As fear spreads through Roaring Fork, she accepts a house-sitting job at an isolated mansion. A second arson kills actress Sonja Dutoit and her child. Captain Stacy Bowdree arrives and helps Corrie research historical records. She finds a family tie between Kermode and the Stafford family, who financed the original Roaring Fork smelter. After an argument with Pendergast, Corrie continues alone while he leaves for London. Soon afterward, archivist Wynn Marple bars her from using the town's historical records.

In London, Pendergast and Sherlock Holmes scholar Roger Kleefisch conclude that Doyle wrote an unpublished Holmes story inspired by Wilde's tale. They break into Doyle's former writing cottage and find the manuscript of The Adventure of Aspern Hall.

Back in Roaring Fork, Pendergast has Corrie read the manuscript. Its account of a killer affected by mercury poisoning from hat making points them toward mercury used at the Stafford silver smelter. They conclude that the nineteenth-century cannibals had been poisoned by mercury and that The Heights stands on contaminated ground.

A third arson kills a celebrity fund manager, sending the town into panic during a blizzard. Someone shoots at Corrie's car and kills her dog, leaving a warning for her to leave town. She moves into the Hotel Sebastian. Pendergast travels to Leadville and meets Kyle Swinton, a descendant of the miner who told Wilde the original tale.

Swinton says that the cannibals were killed by a vigilante group called the Committee of Seven in the abandoned Christmas Mine on Smuggler's Wall. After finding Pendergast's notes, Corrie heads to the mine during the blizzard to obtain proof for her thesis. She travels by snowmobile but is chased by a hired killer. Inside the mine, she breaks her ankle, loses a finger, survives rattlesnakes that attack her pursuer, finds the cannibals' skeletons, and collects samples.

Escaping through a drainage pipe into the Ireland Pump Engine building, Corrie is captured by librarian Ted Roman. He admits to the arsons, saying mercury poisoning damaged his mind while growing up in The Heights. He handcuffs Corrie to a pipe and sets the building on fire. Pendergast arrives in a snowcat after realizing where Corrie had gone. He finds a burned body handcuffed to the pipe, later identified as Betty Kermode, and believes Corrie has died before chasing Ted into the mine.

At another mine exit, Stacy Bowdree captures the hired killer just before he can kill the injured Corrie. During the chase, Pendergast's gunfire triggers an avalanche that buries Ted. Pendergast attempts to save him but cannot.

Stacy and Pendergast rescue Corrie. Three days after Christmas, she recovers in the hospital. FBI laboratory results confirm high mercury levels in the cannibals' remains. Federal authorities begin examining the Stafford family, Montebello, and their associates over the toxic cover-up and efforts to silence Corrie. Stacy receives an FBI interview offer. Pendergast gives Corrie his annotated crime-scene textbook, and the three friends spend a quiet, belated Christmas together.

== Reception ==
Sherlock Holmes fans will relish Preston and Child’s 13th novel featuring eccentric FBI agent Aloysius Pendergast (after 2012’s Two Graves), one of their best in this popular series. ... Lee Child, Clive Cussler, Anne Rice, and Peter Straub have all supplied blurbs for this installment, which easily stands on its own with only passing references to Pendergast’s complex backstory

—Review by Publishers Weekly
