= The Cabinet of Curiosities =

2002 novel by Douglas Preston and Lincoln Child

- Author: Lincoln Child, Douglas Preston
- Language: English
- Series: Aloysius Pendergast
- Genre: Thriller, Science fiction
- Publisher: Grand Central Publishing
- Publication date: June 3, 2002
- Publication place: United States
- Media type: Print, e-book, audiobook
- Pages: 565 pp.
- ISBN: 0-446-53022-0
- OCLC: 47737906
- Dewey Decimal: 813/.54 21
- LC Class: PS3566.R3982 C33 2002
- Preceded by: Reliquary
- Followed by: Still Life with Crows

The Cabinet of Curiosities is a thriller novel by American writers Douglas Preston and Lincoln Child, released on June 3, 2002 by Grand Central Publishing. This is the third installment in the Special Agent Pendergast series.

== Plot summary ==
Workers at a construction site in Manhattan discover a long-buried tunnel containing the bodies of 36 young people from over a century ago, each with part of their spines removed. Secretive Special Agent Aloysius X. L. Pendergast takes an interest in the case and recruits Dr. Nora Kelly, an archaeologist at New York City's American Museum of Natural History, to quickly investigate the crime scene and collect evidence prior to the intervention of Anthony Fairhaven, the wealthy real estate developer who is directing the construction of a new apartment tower on the property. Fairhaven has the bodies quickly removed and the discovery hushed up, but Dr. Kelly is able to recover a note with the name and address of one of the victims, a poor young girl named Mary Greene. Afraid of losing her job, Dr. Kelly is reluctant to continue the investigation, but Agent Pendergast convinces her to continue in pursuit of what he believes to be the case of a century-old string of brutal murders.

The two soon discover that the tunnel was located underneath a former cabinet of curiosities owned by a man named Shottum, which burned down a century previously. Despite the efforts of Roger C. Brisbane III, a Museum bureaucrat and Dr. Kelly's boss, to curtail their efforts in fear of threatening Fairhaven's contributions to the museum, they are able to locate letters by Shottum in the museum archives detailing Shottum's discovery of the murderous scientific experiments that his renter, Dr. Enoch Leng, was conducting in pursuit of extending the human lifespan. They suspect that Leng abducted his victims from the cabinet of curiosities, and that he murdered Shottum and burned down the building when he was discovered. They have difficulty finding information about the mysterious Leng and his activities after the cabinet was burned down, and are further hindered by the police captain on the case, who assigns an officer named Patrick O'Shaughnessy to follow them. However, O'Shaughnessy takes an interest in the case, and agrees to assist in the investigation.

Meanwhile, Dr. Kelly's boyfriend, New York Times reporter Bill Smithback, attempts to help Dr. Kelly get leverage at the museum by publishing a sensational article about the murders, to the shock of the public and anger of the authorities. A similar string of murders begin to occur around present-day Manhattan, with bodies turning up missing portions of their spine. The police and mayor publicly blame Smithback's article for triggering a copycat murderer, endangering Dr. Kelly's position at the museum and causing her to angrily break off plans to move in together. Pendergast tells Dr. Kelly and O'Shaugnessy that he believes that the original killer may be the perpetrator of the current-day killings as well, having succeeded at extending his own life. Pendergast is subsequently attacked by the killer and nearly dies. While he is hospitalized, Dr. Kelly is lured to the museum's basement archives by the same killer, where she discovers the mutilated corpse of the museum's archive specialist, who had been aiding them in their research, and barely escapes with her life.

Under Agent Pendergast's guidance, Dr. Kelly locates the site of Leng's former laboratory and digs up the basement of the current-day building, discovering more bodies and evidence of medical experiments. O'Shaughnessy tracks one of the medical compounds discovered to an old apothecary, where he is able to retrieve a historical ledger of customers and sales, but is quickly abducted by the killer before he can show it to anyone. Meanwhile, Smithback cons his way into the museum archives and finds Leng's address at the time of the historical killings. He breaks into the old house and discovers that it is still in use, allowing the killer to trap him and prepare to operate on him.

Agent Pendergast and Dr. Kelly also discover Leng's old address, and realize that Smithback is in danger. They enter the house and discover a recently killed corpse, which strongly resembles Pendergast. The killer lures them into a trap with the dying body of O'Shaughnessy, and locks them in a cell while he operates on Smithback. Pendergast escapes to confront the killer, revealing that the current-day murders were committed by Fairhaven, who had discovered the achievements of Leng - Pendergast's great-grand-uncle - and tortured him to death in order to obtain his secrets. Pendergast hints that he knows of Leng's ulterior motives and lures Fairhaven into a secret basement concealed in the house, suffering a gunshot wound in the process, but allowing Dr. Kelly to save Smithback. In the basement, Pendergast and Fairhaven find Leng's real cabinet of curiosities, a vast collection of toxic plants and insects as well as weaponry and artifacts from around the world. Pendergast surmises that Leng's true goal was to perfect a method of global genocide, but that he gave up on his research in 1954 after the Castle Bravo thermonuclear bomb was successfully test-detonated, believing humanity to already be doomed. Fairhaven attempts to execute Pendergast using the ancient weaponry, but inadvertently poisons himself from handling poisoned objects, dying gruesomely.

Pendergast, Dr. Kelly, and Smithback cover up the existence of the secret basement when they report to the police. At the gravesites of the original 36 victims, Pendergast burns the last evidence of Leng's discoveries of the formula to prolong human life, to Smithback's dismay and Dr. Kelly's approval. The Leng house is eventually turned over to Pendergast's ownership, where he enlists the help of a friend and researcher, Wren, to begin cataloguing the contents of the secret cabinet of curiosity, hinting at something else hidden in it.

== Background ==
The character of Nora Kelly first appeared in Child and Preston's thriller novel Thunderhead (1998). Kelly was modeled on Lincoln Child's grandmother Nora Benjamin Kubie, an amateur archaeologist and writer.
