= Relic (Preston and Child novel) =

1995 novel by Douglas Preston and Lincoln Child

- Author: Lincoln Child, Douglas Preston
- Language: English
- Series: Aloysius Pendergast
- Genre: Horror, science fiction, thriller
- Publisher: Tor Books
- Publication date: 1995
- Publication place: United States
- Media type: Hardcover
- Pages: 480
- ISBN: 0-8125-4326-2
- OCLC: 34014907
- Followed by: Reliquary

Relic is a 1995 novel by American authors Douglas Preston and Lincoln Child, and the first in the Special Agent Pendergast series. As a horror novel and techno-thriller, it comments on the possibilities inherent in genetic manipulation, and is critical of museums and their role both in society and in the scientific community. It is the basis of the film The Relic (1997).

== Plot ==
In September 1987, Dr. Julian Whittlesey is leading an expedition through the Amazon Basin in search of the lost Kothoga tribe, which worships a lizard god called Mbwun, hoping to prove that they still exist. Whittlesey disappears after finding the mutilated body of his partner. The following year, a dock worker in Belém is brutally killed when a freighter arrives with a shipment of crates from the expedition.

In 1995, in a fictionalized version of New York City's AMNH, two boys are found dead in a museum stairwell after getting lost after hours. NYPD Lieutenant Vincent D'Agosta leads the investigation into the vast museum basement and subbasement, and discovers a claw embedded in one of the victim's brains. Meanwhile, museum leadership including curator Winston Wright, deputy head Ian Cuthbert, and PR director Lavinia Rickman attempt to keep the murders quiet in the lead-up to the grand opening of the new "Superstition" exhibition, which features wealthy benefactors. Rickman hires NYT reporter Bill Smithback Jr. to cover the investigation, but edits his reports to be more palatable towards museum leadership. Employees spread the rumor of the "Museum Beast", a legendary monster that roams the subbasement.

When a security guard is also killed, FBI Special Agent Aloysius Pendergast arrives to aid in the investigation. Ethnopharmacology grad student Margo Green, her advisor, Dr. Whitney Frock, and Pendergast find that the claw from the autopsy match a Mbwun figurine sent back from Whittlesey's expedition. They also find letters that Whittlesey sent to a colleague, Montague, who later disappeared. Pendergast reveals that he is investigating the connection between the museum murders and the dock worker deaths, having traced the shipment of Whittlesey's crates between the incidents. However, the recorded contents of the crates reveal nothing but the figurine and dried plants.

Margo and Smithback learn that Whittlesey claimed to have located the lost Kothoga tribe alive on a tepui deep in the Brazilian jungle, as well as a unique plant its base that had protein-like qualities to it. The government bombarded the tepui with napalm in 1988, killing the remaining Kothoga. Margo and Frock realize that the plant Whittlesey discovered was in the crates, and run computerized analyses that find that the plants are rich in thalamoid hormones also found in small amounts in the human hypothalamus gland, and the claw belonged to an unknown creature with simultaneous primate, reptile, and human genetics. They deduce that the creature is a predator of almost superhuman strength, speed, and intelligence, and is dependent on the now-extinct plant for nutrition; in its absence, it has been slaughtering humans and consuming their hypothalamus as a substitute.

Under pressure from the museum leadership, the gala is allowed to begin, with security presence from the NYPD and FBI. Gala attendees find a body hidden above a display, causing a mass panic. At the same time, an NYPD officer is startled and opens fire on the security control room, destroying the central switching box and shutting down the museum's power. This causes the museum to enter an automatic security lockdown, trapping many people inside one section. Green, Frock, and Pendergast encounter the creature and shoot at it, only for the bullet to bounce off the creature's skull.

D'Agosta leads Smithback and a group of gala attendees into the subbasement and tunnels beyond to seek escape, where the creature attacks, killing several people. The creature then finds the three directors hiding in an office, slaughtering Rickman and Wright, but mysteriously sparing Cuthbert. He is rescued by a SWAT team shortly before the entire team is killed. The group from the gala reaches the sewers through rising stormwater and finds the creature's lair, an underground chamber filled with corpses and trinkets, before escaping onto the street. In a final stand, Pendergast and Margo kill the creature by shooting it through the eye.

4 weeks later, the survivors convene, and Pendergast explains that the Kothoga created the Mbwun by feeding a human the strange plant that Whittlesey discovered, which results in the subject transforming into the creature. When the tepui was destroyed, the Mbwun followed the crates of plants to New York, living off the fibers for years and killing Montague when he came to investigate. The museum directors covered up evidence of Montague's disappearance and moved the crates into the heavily fortified vault; unable to access them, the Mbwun turned to murdering people and animals in the sewers and underground tunnels for their hypothalami. Meanwhile, Assistant Curator Gregory Kawakita performs his lab work and realizes that the creature was actually Whittlesey himself, after being forced to consume the plant by the Kothoga. Using the surviving plant samples, Kawakita develops a drug that turns users first into addicts, then into Mbwun itself, and begins selling it on the street. He reflects that the Kothoga had no control over the Mbwun due to its unlimited access to the plant. In contrast, he is the only person alive capable of making the drug, and believes that he will now assert control over the creatures where the Kothoga failed.

== Characters ==
=== Major characters ===
- NYPD Lieutenant Vincent D'Agosta, a police officer working to solve the murders
- Margo Green, a graduate student working at the museum
- Dr. Frock, Green's advisor and department head at the museum
- William Smithback, Jr., an ambitious journalist who is writing a book about the exhibition for the museum
- Special Agent Aloysius X. L. Pendergast, a secretive and highly resourceful FBI special agent
- George Moriarty, the curator of the Superstition exhibit.

=== Minor characters ===
- Dr. Ian Cuthbert, deputy head of the museum.
- Gregory Kawakita, he eventually discovers what/who Mbwun really is.
- Julian Whittlesey, the principal antagonist.
- Lavinia Rickman, the chief of public relations.
- Ippolito, the director of security at the museum.
- John Bailey, an NYPD officer.
- Special Agent Spencer Coffey, an FBI agent.

== Sequel novel ==
- Relic was followed by the bestselling sequel, Reliquary (1997)
- Aloysius Pendergast, who is introduced in Relic, also appears in several of Preston's and Child's following novels, along with Smithback, Green, and D'Agosta.

== Film adaptation ==
A film based on the book was released in 1997, but changed several aspects of the story, omitting numerous characters and changing the setting to the Chicago Museum of Natural History rather than the New York Museum of Natural History (fictional but strongly based on the American Museum of Natural History). The film was directed by Peter Hyams and stars Penelope Ann Miller as Dr. Margo Green, Tom Sizemore as Lt. Vincent D'Agosta, and Linda Hunt as Dr. Ann Cuthbert.

=== Changes from the novel ===
The film gives away key plot points throughout its duration; in contrast, in the novel, the explanation is delivered in the last few pages, giving the book a twist ending. The movie has a similar twist during its climax. The following table details additional changes.

Name	Character description from the novel	Character description from the film
Margo Green	Is described as an introverted graduate student. Had an indirect role in the killing of the creature by assisting Pendergast.	Is a Doctor of evolutionary biology. Is brownish blonde, feisty, and assertive. In addition, she kills the creature. Played by Penelope Ann Miller
Lt. Vincent D’Agosta	Described as overweight, and approaching early middle age; disdainful of superstitions	Is younger and more athletic. Also extremely superstitious. Played by Tom Sizemore.
Dr. Frock	Survives by hiding in an office in his wheelchair while Margo and Pendergast run on ahead to get to a place where they are able to kill the creature.	Is slain by the creature; character is played by James Whitmore.
Dr. Ian Cuthbert	Survives a close encounter with the monster, at the expense of his sanity, his boss, and his public relations director.	Changed to a female character, Dr. Ann Cuthbert, played by actress Linda Hunt.
Gregory Kawakita	An intellectual loner, prefers to research on his own. Born in Japan, raised in Britain. It is shown in the epilogue that he figured out the origins of the creature.	Is renamed Greg Lee; he is a Chinese-American and is depicted as obsequious and underhanded. He is played by Chi Moui Lo. Is killed by the monster.
Agent Pendergast	Smooth-talking, urbane, and extremely clever FBI Agent from New Orleans	He is completely written out; his role is combined with Lt. Vincent D’Agosta.
William "Bill" Smithback	Entertaining but nosy journalist writing a book for the museum's "Superstition" exhibit; friend of Margo Green. Helps D'Agosta get a group of guests, including the Mayor of New York City, out of the Museum.	Completely cut from film, no replacement.
The Museum Monster	Named "Mbwun" (translation: "He Who Walks On All Fours"). It is worth noting that this translation matches the Navajo name for a Skinwalker (yee naaldlooshii) or, "With it, He goes on all fours." Description, at best, is a "scaly primate." Characterized by an unusual smell and glowing red eyes. The DNA of this creature includes gecko genes. Is described as being "as fast as a greyhound with the intelligence of a human." Was much stealthier than its movie counterpart. Received more sympathy in the novel; both Margo and Ian Cuthbert described it as "lonely" and "sad." Used to be archaeologist Julian Whittlesey. Transformation time may have been the same, but the time from arrival in New York to killing humans is measured in years rather than weeks, and begins with small animals. There is some evidence of the monster retained some sentimental feelings of his human life. The packing crate that contained the Mbwun plant the monster needed was stored for a time at the museum and allowed the monster to survive without killing. Only after the crate and dried plants were moved beyond its reach did it turn to violence. The creature's skull and hide were durable enough that bullets fired at its head were deflected. It is finally killed by Agent Pendergast, who shoots it through its eye socket with a large caliber handgun.	Named "Kothoga" (translation: "Satan is my Father"); the name had been used for the tribe worshipping/creating Mbwun in the novel. This Kothoga is more massive and somewhat feline in shape, it has large mandibles sprouting from the side of its face, similar to a stag beetle, resembles a reptilian tiger and walks and runs like a big cat. It had a hairy spine and a forked tongue, with long and curvy razor teeth, it also has a long and flexible reptilian tail. Instead of red, its eyes are green. There was also very little sympathy towards it. As in the book, it used to be anthropologist John Whitney, and it has subtle humanoid features as it has wide shoulders, and a human like forehead. Began killing humans almost immediately upon arrival in Chicago and actually killed the crew of the ship that brought it to the city. The crate containing the plant was destroyed almost immediately upon arrival in the museum in Chicago as a precaution against possible biohazard. It is eventually killed via immolation after its hesitation to attack Margo Green, perhaps showing some extent of human emotion, allowing her to hide inside a maceration tank which closes before the creature is blown apart from an explosive reaction. NOTE: There are in fact two museum monsters in the movie; the other is a beetle which eats the Kothoga plant and, as a result, becomes a massive and hideous exaggeration of itself. Margo crushes it to death with a biochemistry textbook, making her the principal character who kills both the mutants.

== See also ==
- Altered States
- The Crate
