= The Monster of Florence (disambiguation) =

The Monster of Florence was an Italian serial killer active in the 1970s.

The Monster of Florence may also refer to:

- The Monster of Florence: A True Story, a 2008 book about the killings
- The Monster of Florence (2009 miniseries), an Italian miniseries about the killings directed by Antonello Grimaldi
- The Monster of Florence (2025 miniseres), an Italian miniseries about the killings directed by Stefano Sollima
- The Monster of Florence (1986 film), a 1986 Italian film about the killings directed by Cesare Ferrario

== See also ==
- Il Mostro
