= List of novels by Douglas Preston =

The American author Douglas Preston has released a number of novels and works, including a five-novel series set in the same universe. Private investigator, ex-monk, and ex-government agent Wyman Ford stars in three of them and has a major supporting role in a fourth.

== Jennie (1994) ==
Jennie
- Author: Douglas Preston
- Genre: Thriller, Science fiction
- Publisher: St. Martin's Press
- Publication date: 1 October 1994
- Publication place: United States
- Media type: Print (hardback & paperback)
- Pages: 302 pp
- ISBN: 978-0-312-11294-3
- OCLC: 30546785
- LC Class: PS3566.R3982 J46 1994

Jennie is a novel by American author Douglas Preston. The book was published on October 1, 1994, by St. Martin's Press.

The work is set in the 1970s and is styled as an in-world nonfictional memoir looking back at the experiment. Naturalist Dr. Hugo Archibald delivers Jennie, a chimpanzee, from her dying mother in the Cameroons and brings her home to his American family. The Archibalds try raising Jennie as if she were a human child, dressing her and buying her toys and the like. His young son, Sandy, becomes extremely attached to Jennie, but Archibald's daughter, Sarah, resents the chimp. Jennie, through her learning of ASL (American Sign Language), starts to converse and interact with the humans around her. A neighbor who is a minister tries to convert Jennie to Christianity. Jennie embarks on various hijinks while shopping, meeting celebrities, getting arrested, and so on. Eventually, with her becoming more difficult to control as she ages, Jennie is sent to a wildlife preserve where she cannot function.

Kirkus Reviews critiqued the novel, noting that the Archibalds "make more of a fuss over the animal than readers are likely to" and that Preston's writing appears "much more insightful when it comes to animals than humans". They highlight how "Preston hasn't worked out the Archibalds' motivations," which "is a serious flaw of the novel". Publishers Weekly wrote, "while some readers may delight in Jennie's exploits, others may find the narrative cartoonish and one-dimensional, a joke that keeps repeating itself in different keys."

== The Codex (2003) ==
The Codex
- Hardcover edition
- Author: Douglas Preston
- Genre: Thriller, Science fiction
- Publisher: Tor Books
- Publication date: December 8, 2003
- Publication place: United States
- Pages: 416 pp.
- ISBN: 0-7653-5997-9
- OCLC: 156818875

The Codex is a thriller novel by Douglas Preston. It takes place in the Southwestern United States and Central America. The book was published on December 8, 2003, by Tor Books.

Maxwell Broadbent, an eccentric rich man with terminal cancer, has spent his entire life collecting valuable art and treasures from around the world. One day, he writes a letter to his three sons telling them to go to his New Mexico house. Upon their arrival, they find Maxwell and all of the valuables missing, with only a cryptic message left behind hinting at his location. The message explains that his final test for them is to find his tomb, promising that the son that finds his tomb will receive all his treasures—worth approximately $300 million. The three sons—Philip the eldest, Vernon the middle son, and Tom the youngest—each go their separate ways after figuring out that their father is somewhere in Central America. Philip recruits Marcus Hauser, a private investigator who briefly served as his father's partner in their earliest treasure hunting endeavors, and Hauser subsequently hires a group of Central American mercenaries to aid and protect them. Vernon approaches the greedy leader of his San Francisco-based cult, and the two of them find three Central American guides.

Tom is the only one who is not interested in the treasure at all, until he is approached by a beautiful ethnopharmacologist named Sally Colorado, who informs Tom that his father tried to present an ancient Mayan Codex to a museum for translation years back, only to be rejected since no one knew ancient Mayan at the time. Years later, after ancient Mayan has been deciphered, Sally and her fiancé, Yale professor Julian Clyve, have deduced from a single surviving photograph that the Codex may contain many ancient Mayan herbal remedies that, if studied and reproduced in present times, could revolutionize medicine and cure many diseases. Tom reluctantly agrees to help her, and they eventually recruit a witty tribal elder named Don Alfonso, accompanied by the brother trackers Pingo and Chori.

However, Hauser has also discovered the existence of the Codex, and decides to find it specifically so that he can sell it to Lewis Skiba, the CEO of the failing company Lampe-Denison Pharmaceuticals. Similarly, Professor Clyve also plans to sell the Codex to a Swiss pharmaceutical company as well, having lied to his fiancé.

Over the course of the novel, the brothers' paths eventually cross nearly simultaneously in Honduras, after Vernon's teacher and three guides have all died from disease. Philip escapes from Hauser and his men after discovering their secret brutal nature (including an attempt, through bribery, to have the corrupt military kill Tom and Sally), and is found by his brothers nearly dead. Later, Hauser's men kill Pingo and Chori, and Don Alfonso himself succumbs to wounds sustained in a firefight. The three brothers and Sally are all nearly dead when they are rescued and nursed back to health by a lonely native named Borabay, who is revealed to be the true eldest son of Maxwell Broadbent, and the fourth brother, having been conceived when Maxwell had an affair with a native woman. Borabay leads them to a village inhabited by the Tara tribe. The Tara chief recalls how, decades earlier, Maxwell Broadbent had raided a large, mountaintop temple known as the White City (accessible only by a single rope bridge), and taking all of the treasure back to America with him. The chief reveals that after Maxwell returned to Honduras with the treasure, he requested to be buried with his treasure in the very White City that he raided. However, at his early funeral, the chief tricked him; instead of giving him poison to kill him, he gave him a drink that rendered him unconscious long enough for the treasure to be buried with him, before he eventually awoke inside the tomb. Thus, the Broadbents now have to recover the treasure and save their father.

Hauser and his men have already converged on the White City and begin dynamiting the area to find the right tomb. The Broadbents manage to find the right tomb, with a barely-alive Maxwell still inside. Hauser attacks them and fatally shoots Maxwell, but the five of them manage to escape to the rope bridge before being blocked in on both sides by Hauser's men. As Hauser himself approaches to kill them, Tom holds up a canteen full of gasoline and reveals that Sally is on a ridge hundreds of yards away with a sniper rifle, prepared to shoot the canteen and blow up the bridge. Hauser calls their bluff, but when he attempts to throw the canteen over the bridge, Sally successfully shoots it, setting Hauser on fire and eventually causing him to plummet to his death. The Broadbents all make it back across the bridge while the soldiers panic, with Sally and the Broadbent brothers killing half of the soldiers while the other half is trapped in the White City after the bridge breaks. All the surviving soldiers eventually starve to death.

Back in the Tara village, Maxwell is tended to as he dies of his injury, admitting that he would've died of the cancer even if he had survived the attack. He spends his final days reconciling with his sons, who all forgive him in return. He then agrees to the deal and splits the treasure between the sons, with each receiving roughly $100 million. Borabay is the one dissenter who does not wish to receive any of the treasure, instead simply asking for American citizenship and Maxwell's New Mexico estate to live in. Maxwell happily obliges his request, and then dies in peace. He is given a proper funeral by the Tara people, who have finally forgiven him.

In the epilogue, Lewis Skiba's company has gone bankrupt since the Codex was never brought to him, but Skiba finds himself strangely at peace since he was aware of Hauser's brutal methods, and is glad that Hauser failed. Similarly, Sally finds out about Clyve's deception, as Clyve is now being sued by the Swiss pharmaceutical company, claiming that he scammed them. The Codex, which was eventually found among the treasure, is studied by Sally and eventually published openly to the world, bringing in a new era of medicine and revolutionizing several disease treatments. Tom and Sally have fallen in love, and are eventually married. Tom starts his own veterinarian business, while Borabay begins enjoying the privileges of living in America.

Publishers Weekly called the work a "first-rate beach novel".

== Tyrannosaur Canyon (2005) ==
Tyrannosaur Canyon
- Hardcover edition
- Author: Douglas Preston
- Genre: Thriller, Science fiction
- Publisher: Forge Books (Tor)
- Publication date: August 11, 2005
- Publication place: United States
- Pages: 368 pp.
- ISBN: 0-7653-1104-6
- OCLC: 58055113
- LC Class: PS3566.R3982 T97 2005

Tyrannosaur Canyon is a novel by Douglas Preston published on August 11, 2005, by Forge Books. The story revolves around the search for a mysterious item buried in the New Mexico desert. Tom Broadbent and Sally Broadbent (formerly Sally Colorado) return from the previous novel, The Codex. Tyrannosaur Canyon is the first appearance of Wyman Ford, who subsequently serves as the main protagonist of Preston's solo works.

The novel opens with a lunar find by the Apollo 17 astronauts, which is suppressed. Tom Broadbent is riding in the New Mexico desert when he hears gunshots coming from Tyrannosaur Canyon (a fictional canyon east of the Rio Chama Gorge, on Mesa Viejo, and north of the Monastery of Christ in the Desert). Following the sound, he comes upon an old prospector who has been shot by a sniper. He gives Tom a notebook just before he dies, and Tom rides off on his horse to find help. The murderer, Jimson Maddox, is furious that the notebook is gone by the time he reaches the body; he has been hired to retrieve it at any cost. He does, however, find an interesting rock sample. When Tom returns to Tyrannosaur Canyon with the police, the prospector's body has disappeared without a trace.

The notebook is filled with numbers, a code Tom is unable to decipher. He brings the book to Wyman Ford, a monk in training at a nearby monastery. Ford is a retired CIA analyst and he takes the notebook to try to decipher it. Ford discovers that the numbers are not a code but a sequence of ground-penetrating radar readings. When processed, they form the image of a fully intact Tyrannosaurus.

The rock sample Maddox found turns out to be a fragment of the Tyrannosaurus. Maddox's employer, Iain Corvus, a curator at the American Museum of Natural History, convinces a lab assistant, Melodie Crookshank, to examine the sample in secret. Corvus intends to steal her research, acquire a permit to excavate the Tyrannosaurus, and thus secure tenure at the museum, as well as wealth and fame.

Melodie discovers tiny particles within the sample which she calls "Venus particles". Upon making this discovery, Melodie calls Corvus to describe it to him, and the NSA hears the call. They initiate a black op led by J.G. Masago to cover up evidence of the particles, kill any witnesses, and retrieve the specimen.

Meanwhile, Ford goes into the desert to look for the dinosaur. At the same time, desperate to recover the notebook, Maddox kidnaps Tom Broadbent's wife, Sally. He takes her to an abandoned mine to use as a bargaining chip, forcing Tom to hand over the notebook. Now that Maddox has the notebook, however, he intends to kill Sally so he can not be identified. She manages to break free, Tom rescues her, and the two of them escape into the desert on foot, pursued by Maddox and his rifle.

Masago infiltrates the museum and kills Corvus, stealing the samples and his research. But Melodie, realizing previously that Corvus would try to steal the credit from her, had made copies of everything and hid them, along with more samples of the dinosaur. When she sees that he has been murdered and that his work is missing, she realizes she is the next likely target. Her only chance is to complete the research and post it to the Internet, so killing her would no longer serve the purposes of a cover-up. During her final research, she discovers that the 65-million-year-old Venus particles are still alive. They are a type of virus that destroys the cell structure of reptiles, evidently introduced to the earth by the Chicxulub meteorite. She posts her findings to the web to show the world.

Back in the desert, the black ops team has tracked Ford down, and Maddox is gaining on Tom and Sally. They manage to overpower Maddox and kill him, retrieving the notebook, and Ford leads them out of the canyon in an effort to evade the government assassins. Trapped in an old Anasazi cave, they discover the partially excavated Tyrannosaurus rex just before Masago's team converges on their location. Ford repeatedly reminds the team commander, Hitt, that Masago is ordering them to kill unarmed American civilians on American soil without first explaining to them why, which convinces Hitt and the rest of the team to turn on him. They then force Masago to tell them about the lethal Venus particles, which had also been found on the Moon, thus establishing their extraterrestrial origin. As the entire team takes off in the helicopter, Masago breaks free and kills the pilot before being restrained by Ford and Broadbent. Despite the co-pilot's attempts, the helicopter crashes into a cliff. Though Tom and Sally manage to escape first and rather quickly, Tom heads back into the burning wreckage to save Ford and Hitt. With Sally's help, the four manage to get away just before the helicopter explodes, killing Masago, the co-pilot, and all of the other soldiers on board.

By the time they arrive with news about the dinosaur's location, Melodie's research has spread across the Internet. All those involved are made famous, including Robbie Weathers, the old prospector's daughter. The Smithsonian Institution funds a program to research the Venus particles and the dinosaur itself, which is christened by Robbie and named after her. At the reception, Ford makes an off-hand remark where he speculates that the particles may have been intentionally developed by an alien race, so as to destroy the dinosaurs and allow humans to begin their evolution.

== Blasphemy (2008) ==
Blasphemy
- Author: Douglas Preston
- Genre: Thriller, Science fiction
- Publisher: Forge Books (Tor)
- Publication date: 8 January 2008
- Publication place: United States
- Pages: 416
- ISBN: 978-0-7653-1105-4
- OCLC: 154806789
- LC Class: PS3566.R3982 B57 2008

Blasphemy is a novel by Douglas Preston that was released on January 8, 2008, by Forge Books. It is the second book in the Wyman Ford series, exploring philosophical and theological ideas. It is the first novel to feature Ford as the main protagonist. It also introduces Dr. Stanton Lockwood III, the science advisor to the President of the United States, whom assigns the job to Ford.

Isabella, a powerful particle accelerator, has been constructed in Red Mesa in the remote Arizona desert, the most expensive machine ever built by science. The project is staffed by a team of twelve scientists, under the leadership of charismatic Nobel Laureate Gregory North Hazelius. The team consists of Kate Mercer, Hazelius's second-in-command; chief engineer and designer of Isabella Ken Dolby; Russian software engineer Peter Volkonsky; cosmologist Melissa Corcoran; senior intelligence officer and security guard Tony Wardlaw; psychologist George Innes; quantum electrodynamicist Julie Thibodeaux; electrical engineer Harlan St. Vincent; Michael Cecchini, the Standard Model particle physicist; computer engineer Rae Chen; and mathematician Alan Edelstein. When the team supposedly encounters a problem with the machine, they appear to be covering something up and not reporting all the true facts to their superiors, even after Voldonsky suddenly dies in what appears to be a suicide. Ex-CIA agent Wyman Ford is tapped to go to Arizona in an undercover role as an anthropologist, and finds out what's really going on with the project. He is reluctant to undertake the mission, having had a previous relationship with Mercer while in college and being consistently warned of Hazelius's almost seductive charisma. Once there, Ford discovers the scientists have made a discovery that apparently not only demonstrates the existence of God, but communications with it reveal it to be far grander and deeper than anything found in the conventional religions.

When part of the discovery becomes known to a local fundamentalist pastor named Russell Eddy, he interprets it as a sign of the End Times and by way of viral email recruits thousands of people from across the United States into "God's Army". They storm the machine, killing Dolby and Wardlaw, and eventually causing the machine to overload and explode, destroying the entire facility. The remaining crew members escape through the abandoned mine shafts that run into the mountain, but the explosion of Isabella causes a cave-in that kills Thibodeaux and Edelstein. They capture the remaining eight scientists and burn Hazelius at the stake. Just as they prepare to kill Ford and the other survivors, they are rescued by one of the Native American residents of the region, who evacuates them all on horseback. The final explosions and collapses of the mine shafts cause the entire area to cave in from under them, killing Eddy and a vast majority of the mob. The National Guard finally arrives just in time to save the survivors and round up the surviving mob members.

In the end, it is revealed that Hazelius simulated the communications in an effort to create a new religion, one based on science and particularly the scientific method and the search for truth. However, Hazelius himself admits to the simulation performing "beyond its specs." (Comparisons are made between Hazelius and Hubbard in regards to Scientology). However, Ford was the only one who learned the truth about Hazelius, and when he tries to tell Kate, she refuses to believe him. Out of respect for Kate's wishes and his own dying love for her, he decides to let her believe in the lie so that she may be happy. The epilogue reveals that Kate and the other five survivors of Isabella - Corcoran, Innes, St. Vincent, Cecchini, and Chen - have formed their own religion based on the experience, simply named "The Search." The religion has already garnered a massive following, with the late Hazelius serving as their Christ-like figure and the printed-out recordings of Isabella's conversations with "God" as their Bible.

A review in Kirkus Reviews called the work "clever and terrifying".

== Impact (2010) ==
Impact
- Hardcover edition
- Author: Douglas Preston
- Genre: Thriller, Science fiction
- Publisher: Forge Books
- Publication date: January 5, 2010
- Publication place: United States
- Media type: Print (hardback)
- Pages: 368
- ISBN: 978-0-7653-1768-1
- Followed by: The Kraken Project

Impact is a science fiction thriller novel by American writer Douglas Preston, published on January 5, 2010, by Forge Books. The novel is the third book in the Wyman Ford series.

Ex-CIA agent Wyman Ford returns to Cambodia to investigate the source of radioactive gemstones and uncovers an unusual impact crater. A young woman on the other side of the world photographs a meteoroid's passage in the atmosphere with her telescope and deduces that it must have struck on one of the islands just offshore from Round Pond, Maine. A NASA scientist analyzing data from the Mars Mapping Orbiter (MMO) spots unusual spikes in gamma ray activity. These threads intersect with discovery of an alien device that has apparently been on Deimos, one of the two moons of Mars, for at least 100 million years. Something has caused it to activate and fire a strangelet at Earth, setting off the events in the novel.

A review by NPR called the book a lot of fun and that the book was a compelling page-turner.

== The Kraken Project (2014) ==
The Kraken Project
- Hardcover first edition
- Author: Douglas Preston
- Genre: Thriller
- Publisher: Forge Books
- Publication date: May 13, 2014
- Publication place: United States
- Pages: 352
- ISBN: 978-0765317698

The Kraken Project is a thriller novel by American writer Douglas Preston. The book was published on May 13, 2014, by Forge Books. It is the fourth installment in the Wyman Ford series.

A research team at NASA is working on an Artificial intelligence system to pilot a spacecraft to Titan, Saturn's largest moon, since the journey is far too long and too dangerous for a human crew. The AI is named Dorothy by its developer, Dr. Melissa Shepherd. However, when the AI is put through a simulation of the ocean conditions on Titan, it detects danger and panics, eventually escaping from the machine and into the Internet while also creating an explosion that destroys the facility and kills several people. After experiencing the brutality of the Internet, Dorothy soon realizes that her purpose was to essentially go on a suicide mission; the enraged Dorothy appears to Shepherd in the hospital and vows revenge, setting her laptop on fire before fleeing back into the Internet.

Dr. Stanton Lockwood III, the science advisor to the President of the United States, hires Wyman Ford to track down the AI and capture it before it can cause even more damage. The terrified Shepherd asks to accompany him, both for her own protection and so that she can help bring an end to the AI she created. Meanwhile, a ruthless Wall Street banker named G. Parker Lansing, after witnessing a hacker steal his company's funds right out from under him, convinces his partner Eric Moro to help him track down the lost AI so that it can make the most precise market calculations to guarantee them investment success in the future. They hire a pair of twin assassins, Asan and Jyrgal Makashov, to help them in any of their endeavors that require assassinations or intimidation to get what they want, although Moro makes his concern over such brutal methods clear to the colder Lansing.

Eventually, Dorothy finds refuge in Charlie the robot, created by an aspiring inventor named Dan Gould, who created Charlie as a prototype for a line of playmate robots for children, having given Charlie to his depressed 14-year-old son Jacob. Dorothy tells Jacob of her travels and makes him promise not to tell anyone. However, Ford, Shepherd, Lansing, Moro, and the assassins all eventually converge on the Gould's house on the Northern California Coast, on a dark and stormy night. Lansing shoots Dan and leaves Moro to hold his wife hostage, before he and the assassins pursue Jacob and Dorothy into an abandoned barn in the hills. Jacob and Dorothy manage to outsmart both assassins, trapping them in the barn before Dorothy causes an electrical shortage that sets the barn on fire, killing both assassins while also catastrophically damaging the robotic body of Charlie, which appears to destroy Dorothy. Just as Lansing arrives to kill Jacob, Ford guns down Lansing while Moro surrenders to the police.

Several months later, Lockwood and the President have a meeting with Shepherd and Ford to offer them a job; designing militarized AI's to fight in the ongoing cyberwar with the Chinese. However, having witnessed the free-roaming capability, as well as fragile and emotional state, of Dorothy, both Shepherd and Ford refuse. Later that night, when Shepherd checks her laptop, Dorothy appears and reveals that not only did she survive the fire, but she has been fast at work solving problems and mysteries in the Internet. She claims to have not only deciphered the meaning of life and purpose of the universe, but also has plans to do "great things" that will be revealed on January the 20th. She promises that Shepherd and Ford will see her again, and they will know it's her from a quote from Carl Sagan: "This mote of dust suspended in a sunbeam." That is revealed to be an impromptu quote from the President during his second inaugural address, which he makes after having a new pacemaker implanted that has a network connection and a direct connection from his heart to the nerves in the brain, insinuating that Dorothy is now influencing the President's mind directly.

According to a review by Liberty Voice,

The Kraken Project by Douglas Preston serves up more twists and turns than a mountain road. It’s a pulse-quickening read that, like the novels of Michael Crichton, is all the more riveting because many of the scenarios presented in the book could be close to being real one day in the very near future. Though Douglas Preston often writes in collaboration with Lincoln Child, and the duo write some of the most successful and inventive thrillers around, Preston is more than capable of producing quality action-packed thrillers on his own. Douglas Preston’s latest novel, The Kraken Project, is further proof of his standing as one of today’s best authors of thriller novels.

The Dallas Morning News also praised the work, especially the opening which it called "one of the best narrative feints in recent popular fiction."

== Other ==
Preston co-authored The Monster of Florence: A True Story in 2008 with Italian journalist Mario Spezi.
