= Simona Caparrini =

Italian actress (born 1972)

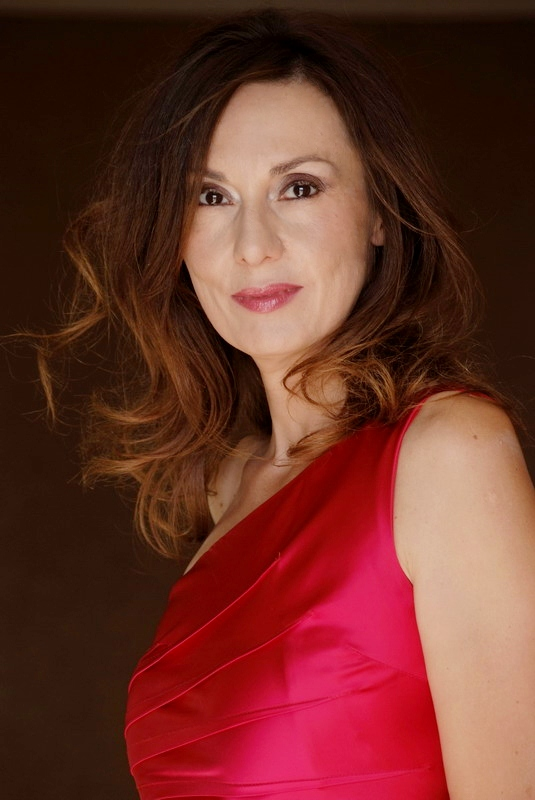
- Born: 5 January 1972 (age 54); Florence, Italy
- Occupation: Actress
- Years active: 1990–present

Simona Caparrini (born 5 January 1972) is an Italian actress. She is known for: To Rome with Love, directed by Woody Allen, where she plays Aunt Joan, the uptight member of Roman high society; Romeo & Juliet, directed by Carlo Carlei; and the Warner Bros. production The Man from U.N.C.L.E., directed by Guy Ritchie.

== Early life ==
Caparrini, originally from Tuscany, graduated at the Theatre of Genova's Drama Academy, completing a three-year program. After her degree, she moved to New York City to study acting at the Union Square Theatre with the American actor George DiCenzo.

== Career ==
Caparrini's film debut was The Invisible Wall, directed by Italian director, Marco Risi. She was eventually chosen by Alberto Sordi, to play Wilma, opposite Sordi himself, in his film Nestore l'ultima corsa. She gained some fame with this role and promoted the movie in various cities along with Sordi.

Caparrini had a cameo role in The Postman (1994), playing Elsa Morante; then she played Ursula in the feature film Banditi (1995). She later starred in the feature film Il cielo è sempre più blu (1996) directed by Antonello Grimaldi.

Caparrini has acted in a number of Italian, French and Spanish TV series. Among them are: Ein Haus in der Toscana (1993) for German TV; Compañeros (1998) for Spanish TV; Marie Fransson (2000) for French TV; Orgoglio (2004), for which she received critical praise, portraying Elvira Graziani; the TV movie Dottor Clown (2008); the dramatic TV series Il mostro di Firenze (2009), based on a true story The Monster of Florence, where she played Daniela Stefanacci; Io e mio figlio – Nuove storie per il commissario Vivaldi (2010), TV series directed by Luciano Odorisio, and Una Buona stagione (2012), directed by Gianni Lepre.

In 2000, Caparrini gained more visibility appearing in the film Io Amo Andrea (2000), where she plays Irene directed by Francesco Nuti; and in 2001, she was in Suor Sorriso, remake of the cult movie The Singing Nun, where she plays Clara, directed by Roger Deutsch; then eventually came the period piece Il Quaderno della spesa (2003), directed by Tonino Cervi; the comedy Nessun messaggio in segreteria (2005), directed by Luca Miniero and Paolo Genovese, opposite Carlo delle Piane and Pierfrancesco Favino; the French sci-fi 8th Wonderland (2008), directed by Nicholas Alberny and Jean Mach; Immaturi (2010), directed by Paolo Genovese, where she plays Katia, a stubborn sex addict permanently in group therapy; and Interno Giorno (2011), directed by Tommaso Rosseliini, where she plays Martina, the movie star's talent agent.

In 2012, Caparrini in Italy and abroad, was chosen by Woody Allen to play Aunt Joan in his feature film To Rome with Love. In 2013, she had a cameo in the feature film Romeo and Juliet, as a noble woman friend of the Capulets. She co-starred in the 2015 spy film The Man from U.N.C.L.E., directed by Guy Ritchie.

== Selected filmography ==
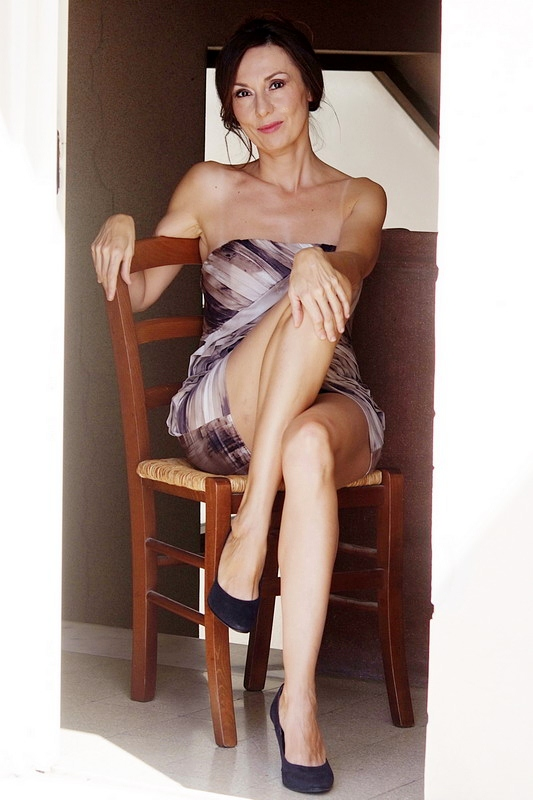
Simona Caparrini

Year	Title	Role	Director
1991	The Invisible Wall	Carla, journalist	Marco Risi
1993	Ein Haus in der Toscana	Simona	Gabi Kuback
1994	Nestore l'ultima corsa	Wilma	Alberto Sordi
1995	The Postman	Elsa Morante	Michael Radford
1995	Banditi	Ursula	Stefano Mignucci
1996	Bits and Pieces	Giulia	Antonello Grimaldi
1996	Linda ed il brigadiere	Tina, landlady	Gianfranco Lanzotti
1998	Compañeros	Elena	José Ramón Ayerra
1999	Un posto al sole	Elisabetta D’Andrea	Cristiano Celeste
2000	Io amo Andrea	Irene	Francesco Nuti
2000	The Accountant	Maria	Glenn Gers
2000	Marie Fransson	Claire	Christiane Spiero
2000	Suor Sorriso	Clara	Roger Deutsch
2000	Casa Famiglia	Maria	Riccardo Donna
2001	Compagni di scuola	Anna, surgeon	Tiziana Aristarco
2003	Il Quaderno della Spesa	Elena	Tonino Cervi
2003	Andata e Ritorno	Vanessa	Alessandro Paci
2004	Orgoglio	Elvira Graziani	Giorgio Serafini
2005	Nessun messaggio in segreteria	Anna, doorkeeper	Paolo Genovese and Luca Miniero
2005	Ho sposato un calciatore	Gina	Stefano Sollima
2006	Capri	Ministro Gastori	Giorgio Molteni
2006	Don Matteo	Clelia Bassi	Elisabetta Marchetti
2008	8th Wonderland	Rossella Brizzi, Italian TV Guest	Nicolas Alberny and Jean Mach
2008	Il Commissario Rex	Serena, Montanary's secretary	Marco Serafini
2009	Il mostro di Firenze	Daniela Stefanacci	Antonello Grimaldi
2010	Doctor Clown	Giulia	Maurizio Nichetti
2010	Io e mio figlio – Nuove storie per il commissario Vivaldi	Cristina Vallauro	Luciano Odorisio
2011	The Immature	Katia	Paolo Genovese
2011	Interno Giorno	Martina	Tommaso Rossellini
2011	La ragazza americana	Carla	Vittorio Sindoni
2011	Una buona stagione	lawyer Lucidi	Gianni Lepre
2012	To Rome with Love	aunt Joan	Woody Allen
2013	Romeo and Juliet	Female guest	Carlo Carlei
2013	Stai lontana da me	Giulia, moglie sottomessa	Alessio Maria Federici
2015	The Man from U.N.C.L.E.	Contessa	Guy Ritchie
