= Il Mostro =

Il Mostro (Italian for "the monster") is a nickname given to the Monster of Florence, an Italian serial killer active in the 1970s.

Il Mostro may also refer to:

- Il mostro (1977 film), an Italian thriller film directed by Luigi Zampa
- Il mostro (1994 film), an Italian comedy film directed by Roberto Benigni
- Il mostro (miniseries), an Italian miniseries directed by Stefano Sollima
- Il mostro, a yacht participating in the 2008–2009 Volvo Ocean Race

== See also ==
- The Monster of Florence (disambiguation)
- Monster (disambiguation)
