= Giuliano Mignini =

Italian magistrate (born 1950)

Public Minister Giuliano Mignini
- Born: 13 April 1950 (age 76); Perugia, Umbria, Italy
- Education: Law degree
- Alma mater: University of Perugia
- Occupation: Public prosecutor
- Years active: 1979–2020
- Known for: Monster of Florence; Murder of Meredith Kercher
- Children: Four daughters

Giuliano Mignini (born 13 April 1950) is an Italian magistrate. He retired as a public prosecutor in Perugia, Umbria, in 2020. He is known for his involvement as the prosecutor in the investigation of the death of Francesco Narducci, a doctor who was found dead in the Trasimeno lake in 1985. Mignini opened an investigation into his death as a cold case in October 2001, as he suspected he could be the victim of a murder. He was soon joined by prosecutors from the Florence jurisdiction who were also investigating the deceased doctor, as they believed Narducci was involved in the Monster of Florence serial murders case.

Mignini's investigation resulted in the prosecution of 20 individuals over the following years, on allegations indirectly connected to Narducci's death such as cover-up and side-tracking charges. In 2010, all 20 individuals had their charges dropped by a Preliminary Court, mostly due to the expiration of limitation statute terms. Mignini was convicted of abuse of office in 2008 together with police officer Michele Giuttari in a case connected to the Narducci investigations. Mignini and Giuttari were both acquitted on appeal in 2014.

Mignini came to wider public attention as the prosecutor who led the 2007 investigation into the murder of Meredith Kercher, and one of the prosecutors who led the subsequent prosecution of Rudy Guede, Amanda Knox, and Raffaele Sollecito. The conviction of Knox and Sollecito was eventually annulled by Italy's Supreme Court of Cassation on 27 March 2015. The verdict pointed out that as scientific evidence was "central" to the case, there were "glaring defalliances" or "amnesia" and "culpable omissions of investigation activities".

== Education and career ==
Mignini was born in 1950 in Perugia, the son of a high-school teacher belonging to a family of sculptors. He obtained his law degree from the University of Perugia. He had wished to pursue a career in the Air Force, but he was rejected by the Pilots' Academy because of a form of daltonism. He passed the magistrate's examination in 1979, and worked for one year in Volterra serving as pretore (an investigating judge role which does not exist anymore in the Italian system). He served for several years as judge in the courts of Pisa and Terni, where he worked on different times both as a criminal and as a civil judge. In 1989 he returned to Perugia and served as investigator and criminal prosecutor (sostituto procuratore), between 2004 and 2012 he also had powers as the head of anti-mafia prosecutors (Direzione Distrettuale Antimafia) in Umbria, in 2013 he took a post at the Appeals prosecution office (Procura Generale).

== Notable cases ==
=== Narducci case ===
The investigation into the death of Francesco Narducci (1949–1985), a Perugian doctor, lasted about ten years, between 2000 and 2010. It is one of the investigations connected to the principal investigation on the serial murders known as "The Monster of Florence" case. Narducci's body was recovered from Lake Trasimeno near Perugia, Umbria, in 1985 and was determined to be a drowning. His body was discovered a month after the final double-murder linked to the Monster of Florence. The name of Narducci belonged to a list of "persons of interest" issued by the Florence Police in relation to the Monster of Florence cases since 1987. Police and prosecutors in Florence initially investigated Narducci's death as connected to the murders after a number of anonymous letters were received, but he had been dismissed as a suspect since he had been in America during at least one of the murders.

==== Perugian investigation into Narducci's death ====
In early 2002, blogger Gabriella Carlizzi contacted Mignini regarding her theories about Narducci being part of a secret society behind the Monster killings. Narducci's name had also emerged within an ongoing phone stalking case Mignini was investigating, where some of the conversations they recorded included references to the Monster of Florence and secret societies. While Mignini would claim the intercepted conversations included references to Narducci as well, and those references caused him to open the investigation into Narducci, no reference to Narducci was made until May of 2002, months after the case had been opened and its existence leaked to the public. A medical examiner had determined the cause of Narducci's death to be drowning, but no autopsy had been performed at the time, despite it being mandatory under Italian law, reportedly on the insistence of Narducci's father. Pathology professor Giovanni Pierucci had also examined the pictures of the body, taken from a distance on the pier in 1985, and believed that the apparent decay of the cadaver in the photo appeared too advanced to be consistent with a permanence of only five days in the lake's water, and had recommended the unburial and examination of the body.

Mignini asserted that a second body had been used to stage a drowning in the lake, as a cover up for the killing, and claimed to have sufficient evidence that the whole finding of the body at the lake had been a staging, performed at the time as part of a cover-up by state authorities, coordinated by the provincial head of police (questore). On 6 June 2002, he had Narducci's body exhumed and examined, but the exhumed body turned out to be Narducci's. Mignini asserted that the body had been switched twice, and the pathologist claimed to have found evidence that the cause of death was not drowning but strangulation due to a small, isolated fracture on the upper thyroid horn.

Mignini alleged that Narducci had been involved in the murders of the Monster of Florence case, which, according to the theories of the Florence Prosecution, also involved a network of other people linked together by a secret society, and that he had been possibly killed on order of his father, Ugo Narducci, a member of a masonic lodge himself. The same father had masterminded the cover up. Mignini's theory involved a complicated conspiracy of 20 people, including government officials and law enforcement officers, who all concurred in covering up Narducci's cause of death. Mignini indicted 20 people and charged them with the concealment of Narducci's murder. The charges against them were dropped in 2010, partly due to expiration of statutory terms. Narducci's family claim that he committed suicide after having been diagnosed with a serious disease while in the USA.

==== Arrest of journalist Mario Spezi ====
Italian journalist Mario Spezi had covered the Monster of Florence case since 1981 and was still pursuing his own leads in 2006. On 23 February 2006, Mignini summoned American author Douglas Preston for questioning as a person informed about facts related to Spezi's activities. The police, on Mignini's orders, had wiretapped Spezi's phone conversations with Preston regarding a villa in the countryside of Tuscany. According to Preston and Spezi they had investigated the villa on a tip from an ex-convict that evidence regarding the Monster was hidden there, while Mignini interpreted the conversation as intention to plant evidence on the location. Preston has claimed that Mignini used "brutal" tactics during his interrogation, and has accused Mignini of attempting to coerce him into implicating himself and Spezi in the murders, saying "they have techniques that could get you to confess to murder."

On 7 April 2006, the Florence police arrested Spezi. Preliminary judge Marina De Roberti, on Mignini's request, ordered the men to be held in cautionary custody and not to speak with his lawyers anymore before the first hearing in Court that took place on 11 April. This, notwithstanding what many English sources claim, did not allow Mignini to hold and interrogate Spezi for six days without access to legal counsel: De Roberti's order was notified to Spezi on 8 April while he was actually speaking with his lawyer. Mignini formally suspected Spezi of complicity in the homicides of the Monster of Florence case. The request of custody was not motivated by the suspicion of murder, but based on the accusation of attempting to pollute the Narducci investigation. Spezi was held for 23 days, at which point an appeals tribunal found the arrest illegal.

==== Allegations of abuse of office ====
In 2004, the Florence Public Prosecution office discontinued their cooperation with Perugia, and demanded that they alone have the whole investigation file on Narducci's death. Mignini refused to surrender the investigation, claiming the Trasimeno Lake shore where the body was recovered was in territory under his jurisdiction. The Florence police also presented Mignini a recorded conversation with the voice of prosecutor Paolo Canessa apparently admitting that his boss, Chief Prosecutor of Florence Ubaldo Nannucci, could not decide freely but rather was being forced by superior powers. Mignini opened an investigation against Nannucci and against the Chief of Police in Florence, Giuseppe De Donno, based on the recording of Canessa's voice. He accused both the Florence Prosecution and the Florence Police of voluntarily obstructing police activity and hindering the investigation into the death of Narducci. In 2005, the Florentine Police ordered the dismantling of the Serial Crimes Investigation Unit (Gruppo Investigativo Delitti Seriali or GIDES), the Unit that found a connection between the Monster of Florence and Narducci.

In 2006, Florence prosecutor Luca Turco, charged Mignini and the head of the GIDES Michele Giuttari with a number of counts, including the forging of Canessa's voice recording, plus a number of counts of abuse of office for allegedly ordering the wiretapping of the phones of various police officers and journalists involved in the Monster of Florence case. Some media called the escalation "a war between Prosecution Offices". Florence prosecution accused Mignini of carrying on a "parallel investigation" in order to cover up for Giuttari's alleged fabrication of a false recording of Canessa's conversation, and ordered a police raid of his office. Perugian newspapers alleged that the true goal of the Florence raid in the Perugian office was their intention put their hands on the Narducci-Monster of Florence file.

Mignini was charged of being implicated in the forging of a fake audio recording and abusing his powers as he investigated De Donno, and for having wiretapped phone calls of three journalists and two police officers for unjustified reasons. Mignini objected that the Florence Magistrates had no jurisdiction on him because of their conflict of interest (the magistrates prosecuting him belonged to the same office he was investigating into). A preliminary judge in Florence turned down his request to change the trial venue. In January 2010, a Florence court chaired by judge Francesco Maradei acquitted him of the first three counts of fabricating fake evidence, as Mignini and Giuttari managed to prove that the audio recording was authentic, but found him guilty of the remaining four counts of exceeding the powers of his office. He was given a 16-month suspended sentence. Mignini appealed the conviction, saying "My conscience is clear, I know I did nothing wrong." He remained in office through the appeal process, as Italian law does not consider convictions final until all appeals are exhausted, but delayed taking a post at the Procura Generale where he had been already appointed. According to Rome-based journalist and author Barbie Latza Nadeau, even if Mignini were convicted, offenses such as this are rarely grounds for removing a prosecutor from office.

In November 2011, a Court of Appeals accepted his preliminary objection and annulled the previous conviction, also declaring the prosecution by Florentine magistrates illegitimate since some of the Florence prosecutors were also the offended parties, and sent the investigation file to a prosecutor in Turin. The Prosecution General of Florence appealed against the decision at the Supreme Court, so factually blocking the transfer to Turin for at least another year. In February 2013, the Florence office lost their appeal and the Supreme Court ordered the investigation be moved to Turin. Mignini said: "It took me 7 years to be right." In 2016, the Turin court dropped the remaining charges due to the expiration of statutes of limitation.

==== Finding of no wrongdoing ====
While the Italian justice system does not prosecute criminal allegations beyond statutory terms through penal courts, Italian Magistrates are still subjected to a judgement also by a disciplinary court of the High Council of the Judiciary (Consiglio Superiore della Magistratura, or CSM) which seeks to find out facts in the merits, even if the Magistrate has already been acquitted of criminal charges on technicalities, or when there is still reasonable doubt. Mignini underwent a lengthy trial by the CSM about the Florence allegations on Narducci case. In March 2017 the CSM disciplinary court acquitted Mignini of all allegations, finding that "there was no wrongdoing" in his conduct.

=== Murder of Meredith Kercher ===
Meredith Kercher was a young woman murdered in Perugia on 1 November 2007. Mignini was one of the two prosecutors who directed the investigation of the case. In October 2011, Mignini told a reporter from the British newspaper The Guardian "I have felt under attack ever since I investigated Narducci. It all started there." He further suggested that the trial for abuse of power was related to persecution for his role in the Monster of Florence case and blamed American author Douglas Preston, co-author with Spezi of a book about the case, of masterminding a U.S. press campaign against him over the Knox case. As part of his summing up in the first Knox appeal he said "our judicial system has been subjected to a systematic denigration by a well-organised operation of a journalistic and political nature".

Preston has criticized the conduct of Mignini in the trial. In April 2009, Preston appeared in a segment of 48 Hours on CBS, in which he argued that the case against Knox was "based on lies, superstition, and crazy conspiracy theories". In December 2009, after the verdict had been announced, he appeared on Anderson Cooper 360° on CNN and described his own interrogation by Mignini in the same terms, claiming he was also denied a translator, and has since referred to the interrogation as "psychologically brutal". In 2013, the case against Knox and Sollecito was committed to another prosecutor, Alessandro Crini, who obtained the convictions in their retrial. Knox and Sollecito were acquitted by the Supreme Court of Cassation on 27 March 2015, ending the case.

==== Satellite prosecutions initiated by Mignini ====
In February 2013, Mignini launched a defamation suit against Raffaele Sollecito for allegations in Sollecito's book, Honor Bound: My Journey to Hell and Back with Amanda Knox. Mignini later withdrew his claims, and the suit was dismissed.

==== Mignini censure ====
On 4 December 2015, Mignini was disciplined by the High Council of the Judiciary for violation of correct procedure in the arrest of Sollecito in November 2007. The Prosecutor General of the Supreme Court requested his acquittal. Mignini was defended by judge Piercamillo Davigo. The disciplinary panel stated that he issued an oral order of prohibiting legal counsel with Sollecito, instead of issuing a written order as provided by the law. He was issued a censure.

=== Brigitta Bulgari ===
In June 2010, Mignini was the prosecutor involved in the case of porn star Brigitta Bulgari who was arrested and held for 11 days after being charged with child pornography; this followed the surfacing of a mobile phone video showing 15-year-old boys touching her breasts while she performed as a stripper in an Umbria night club. Sexual contact with minors itself may be not punishable under Italian law, but it is illegal to produce videos. Bulgari had her charges dropped in October 2011 based on a preliminary judge assumption that "Bulgari was not aware that there were minors in the club" and "because of intense lights she could not see whether people were filming". Bulgari stated that she was "just trying to make a living" and that she felt sorry for Amanda Knox, pointing out that they were both investigated by the same prosecutor. She also said that she would seek monetary damages for "muddying her name" (she then received €3.500), and planned to write a book about her experiences after arrest.

== See also ==
- Prosecutor in Italy
- Judiciary of Italy
- The Verdict of Perugia
