= The Verdict of Perugia =

Play written by Stefan C. Limbrunner

The Verdict Of Perugia
- Original language: German
- Written by: Stefan C. Limbrunner
- Genre: courtroom drama
- Setting: Corte Di Appello Di Firenze

Premiere
- Date: 2015
- Place: Germany

The Verdict Of Perugia (German: Das Urteil von Perugia) is a German stage play written by Stefan C. Limbrunner that had its premiere performance on 17 September 2015 at the theatre "Cabaret des Grauens" (also known as "Cabaret am Bichl") in Burghausen, Germany. It is notable for being the first theatrical adaptation of the Meredith Kercher murder case, and the subsequent miscarriage of justice concerning Amanda Knox and Raffaele Sollecito. The play is both a true crime documentary and a classic courtroom drama depicting the Nencini trial that took place from September 2013 until January 2014 in Florence, Italy.

The play ran from 17 September 2015 until 10 October 2015.

It is in two acts and has a running time of 3 hours.

== Background ==
The play is an original work based on official courtroom transcripts, publicly available police documents and files, newspaper reports, and the author's own research. The author invested eight years following the case, three years of research, and one year of writing.

The official press folder explains the purpose of the play:

"The Verdict Of Perugia" is an attempt to recreate a real trial, with the real facts, the real argumentative line, using authentic photographic and video material, in the form of an exciting suspense play, a successor of classic courtroom dramas like "Inherit The Wind", "12 Angry Men" and "Judgment At Nuremberg". The sequence of events and wording of the Nencini trial had to be condensed and partially fictionalized for dramatic reasons. Some of the characters, like Amanda Knox, who were not present in person at the Nencini trial, although their statements and witness depositions were provided to the Judges, were shown testifying to the court within the play, in order to keep the plot vivid and lively.

Some real life persons have been amalgamated into fictitious characters in order to make it possible to tell the story. The defense attorney in the play, Vincente Petroscaglia, is based on Carlo Dalla Vedova and Luciano Girgha, while prosecutor Dottoressa Carla Collodi (intentionally named after Pinocchio author Carlo Collodi), was based on both Giuliano Mignini and Manuela Comodi. The Play was written to be performed by seven live actors, with all male and all female witnesses played by the same two actors.

== Characters ==
Amanda Marie Knox

Raffaele Sollecito

Judge Alessandro Nencini

Vincente Petroscaglia, Defense Attorney

Dr. Carla Collodi, Assistant Chief Prosecutor Of Perugia

Meredith Kercher (Voice Over)

Dr. Luca Lalli, pathologist

Edgardo Giobbi, police officer

Giuseppe Codispoti, CSI officer

Dr. Patrizia Stefanoni, forensic scientist of the police

Prof. Dr. Carla Vecchiotti, independent forensic scientist

Rita Ficarra, police officer

The opening night cast included Andrea Reinbacher, Nadine Konietzny, Bernhard Höfellner, Lisa Hanoeffner, Sascha Ciric, Patrick Brenner, Elke Heinrich as the voice of Meredith Kercher and the author of the play.

== Plot ==
PROLOGUE In the prologue of the play, authentic video- and photo material is projected for the audience, while Meredith Kercher, as a wise voice from the afterlife, in heightened language narrates the story of the crime and the first two main trials. She concludes that what the audience is about to see is the third struggle about the verdict of Perugia, the so-called Nencini trial.

ACT 1

The first act opens with Judge Nencini opening the trial and explaining in an introductory speech the task of the court in this case. This is followed by the opening statements of prosecutor Carla Collodi and defense attorney Vincente Petroscaglia. While the prosecution puts forward a theory of three perpetrators of the crime, Amanda Knox, Raffaele Sollecito and Rudy Guede, who murdered together for different reasons, the defense argues that Meredith Kercher was the victim of a sole killer, serial burglar Rudy Guede, who broke into the apartment in Via della Pergola 7, and was caught in the act by the victim returning home. The prosecution presents as the first piece of evidence a reading of Rudy Guedes' 2007 statement to the prosecution, in which he identified Knox. When Collodi wants to conclude the reading, the defense interrupts, pointing out that the reading of the protocol was incomplete. Petroscaglia reads the rest of the statement to prove that originally Rudy Guede did not mention Sollecito but was tricked into it, during a recorded interruption of this first interrogation. The prosecution then presents Amanda Knox's 1.45 statement from early 6 November 2007, often misinterpreted as a "confession".

The next day, Collodi calls the scientific witnesses of the prosecution to the stand. Dr.Patrizia Stefanoni from the Polizia Scientifica testifies that a lot of Rudy Guede's traces were found in the victim's blood, that DNA traces of Knox were found in her house, also shoeprints of her and her bare footprints in Kercher's blood. She also heavily incriminates Sollecito. Regarding the two main pieces of evidence, the bra clasp and the alleged murder weapon, the double DNA knife, Stefanoni clearly attributes them to Sollecito and Knox, therefore providing convincing evidence for three murderers. Stefanoni is followed by pathologist Dr. Luca Lalli, who, visibly shaken by the memory of the crime scene, gives the results of Kercher's autopsy. When Collodi wants to bring him to testify that more than one person was necessary to hold the victim, he refuses to do so, to Collodi's dismay. Petroscaglia cross-examines Dr. Lalli, who then explains that there were absolutely no traces of the defendants to be found on the victim's body, that there is no evidence that more than one person held the victim, and that the fatal knife wound was dealt to Kercher by someone who stood behind her, presumably attacking her by surprise. Petroscaglia is able to move Lalli into confirming that the alleged murder weapon does not fit the wounds of the body, being too long by almost ten centimeters.

The scene jumps several days forward, to the point in time when the defense opens their case, beginning with a speech in which Petroscaglia sharply criticizes the rule of the judge in the constitutional state, especially the complete freedom of evidence evaluation, which makes the profession of judge the only one standing above the law. After an argument with Nencini, Petroscaglia calls Rudy Guede to the stand. But the Judge denies the request to hear that witness, even if Guede is the only person whose presence at the crime scene on the night of the murder is undoubtedly confirmed. Angrily, the defense calls police officers Edgardo Giobbi and Rita Ficarra to the stand in order to cross-examine them. In the relentless questioning of Giobbi, Petroscaglia is able to prove that Giobbi's opinion that the break-in into the apartment was faked is not based on police investigation of any kind, but only on Giobbi's "certain feeling". The defense is also able to establish that the investigators’ suspicions based on Knox’s alleged strange behavior after the murder are completely unfounded, using Giobbi himself as an example. In the even more forceful interrogation of Officer Ficarra, Petroscaglia can show that Knox’s 1.45 statement, memoriale one, was made under extreme suggestive pressure and duress, and was the result of a highly illegal questioning. Ficarra is shown to be very aggressive and forced to admit that the statement was not given voluntarily. The scene fades into black, and the meta level of the play emerges for the first time. Amanda Knox enters the stage and speaks about her tribulations of being unjustly accused. The First Act closes with Knox’s remark that there may be a lot more wrongful conviction cases than anybody thinks.

ACT 2

The Second Act starts again with a monologue of Amanda Knox on the Meta level of the plot, in which she tells us how she met Meredith Kercher for the first time, and also explains how naïve she had been when she first came to Perugia, not knowing what life would hold in store for her. Throughout the second act, whenever time shifts happen, monologues of the Amanda character are placed, so that the audience can find many-sided ways to identify with her and her subjective point of view.

The Action then shifts back into the courtroom, where Judge Nencini announces that the defense will now present its scientific witnesses. First, Giuseppe Codispoti from the crime scene investigation squad is called to the witness stand. The good-hearted Codispoti is confronted with the famous picture of the alleged bloody bathroom that was reprinted worldwide. He freely admits that the red substance is not blood but a forensic marker, and Amanda Knox never saw the bathroom with those supposed "fountains of blood". When Codispoti is asked to comment on the original police video containing the discovery of the bra clasp, which is projected for the court, he cannot help but confirm that the bra clasp could very easily have been contaminated since the international protocols for evidence collection have all been neglected entirely. The video clearly shows that the gloves with which the clasp was touched were visibly dirty. Dr. Collodi forgoes the opportunity to cross-examine Codispoti.

The central witness for the defense is Prof. Dr. Carla Vecchiotti, who, together with Dr. Stefano Conti, provided the first independent examination of the physical DNA evidence in the case. She reluctantly takes the stand. Vecchiotti, very timid and shy at the beginning, grows more and more confident during her testimony. She states clearly that the evidence collection was botched so much that cross-contamination of all physical evidence from the crime scene is likely. She also points out that the DNA traces of Knox found in her own flat are completely irrelevant because they were only found in those places where anyone would naturally leave DNA. When Petroscaglia questions Vecchiotti about the alleged murder weapon, Vecchiotti cannot confirm that Kercher's DNA ever was on the knife, since the first sample has been destroyed and could not be tested anymore, and the second sample was proven not to be human DNA, least of all Kercher's, but starch. Since the knife fits neither the victim's wounds nor the bloody imprint found on one of the bed sheets, and also shows no trace of Kercher's blood, she concludes that it is not the murder weapon, but a random knife out of Raffaele's kitchen that has nothing to do with the murder. Vecchiotti then cites the fact that the DNA quantity of the findings on the bra clasp after Stefanoni's testing was five times higher than before the testing as definitive proof of contamination. Finally, when asked about the traces in the murder room, Vecchiotti, even to Petroscaglia's surprise, goes as far as pointing out that the lack of any trace of Sollecito or Knox in the murder room is undeniable proof of the defendant's absence during the murder and therefore their innocence. The Judge has to restore order in the courtroom. In the cross-examination that follows, Collodi tries to lead Vecchiotti astray, but the witness, having grown confident during her questioning, lectures the prosecutor on scientific thinking instead.

One day later, Vincente Petroscgalia cross-examines Dr. Stefanoni, asking her about the hundreds of test results she did not provide to the defense, even though the court had ordered her to do so. The prosecutor interrupts, and after a heated argument, the judge decides that the matter is not allowed to be discussed, which provokes the defense attorney to request a judicial disqualification of the judge for bias. Nencini rejects the request. In the following brutal questioning of Stefanoni, Petroscaglia is able to prove by confronting the witness with photos and police illustrations that the attribution of a singular shoe and footprints to the defendants made by her office was intentionally wrong, and that Stefanoni had testified falsely about it before. By using a formerly hidden report from her own lab, the defense shows that Stefanoni lied under oath about Knox having left her footprints in the victim's blood, knowing that the footprints were left from showering as early as 2007. An attempt to break the witness to confess the truth fails when prosecutor Collodi intervenes. The last witnesses are Amanda Knox herself and Raffaele Sollecito, who both vividly and shockingly describe, in a scene based on word-for-word translations of earlier court transcripts, how they were set under pressure and manipulated during the infamous interrogation night from 5th to 6 November 2007.

The second Act nears its closure with heated closing arguments from both sides. After a recession, and a final time shift, during which, on the meta level of the play, Knox describes a possible future as a wrongfully convicted person incarcerated for three decades, Judge Nencini finally offers his verdict. At first, the verdict seems to end with an acquittal, but then suddenly changes to an unexpected, almost grotesque conviction with even higher sentences. A traumatized Amanda stands alone while everybody else leaves the stage, and the epilogue begins.

EPILOGUE The Epilogue starts again with the voice of Meredith Kercher, who, in poetic terms, comments on the travesty called justice that just happened. After a final goodbye, the epilogue shifts its focus onto the destiny of Amanda and Raffaele and describes the events up to the final and complete exoneration by the Corte Di Cassazione Di Roma in March 2015. The play ends with a quotation from Jean De La Bruyere: "One Person who is wrongfully convicted is the concern of every decent human being."

== Reception ==
Felix Drexler wrote in his review in the Burghauser Anzeiger: "Based on the actual files and events of the murder case surrounding Amanda Knox and Raffaele Sollecito, a case that happened in 2007 in Perugia, Italy, and that stirred a lot of controversy both in the justice system and the media, author and director Stefan Limbrunner created a spellbinding and extremely gripping courtroom drama."

He further noted that "taking into account that authentic photo and video material was presented, the precision of detail and truth to reality Stefan Limbrunner is employing is impossible to surpass" Drexler especially praised the actors, writing "The mesmerizing performances and impressive use of language is stunning". Stefan Limbrunners performance as Vincente Petroscgalia was described as "outstanding".

As of October 26, 2017, the play has been published on Amazon Kindle.

== See also ==
- Murder of Meredith Kercher
- Amanda Knox
- List of Miscarriages of Justice in Italy
- Giuliano Mignini
