= The Killer Is Still Among Us =

1986 film by Camillo Teti

The Killer is Still Among Us
- Film poster
- Italian: L'assassino è ancora tra noi
- Directed by: Camillo Teti
- Screenplay by: Camillo Teti; Ernesto Gastaldi
- Story by: Camillo Teti; Giuliano Carnimeo
- Starring: Luigi Mezzanotte; Giovanni Visentin; Yvonne D'Abbraccio; Francesco Capitano; Mariangela D'Abbraccio; Riccardo Parisio Perrotti
- Cinematography: Giuseppe Bernardini
- Music by: Detto Mariano
- Production company: Orchidea Film
- Distributed by: Orchidea Film
- Release date: 7 February 1986 (Italy)
- Running time: 83 minutes
- Country: Italy
- Language: Italian

The Killer is Still Among Us is a 1986 Italian horror film written and directed by Camillo Teti, and co-written by Ernesto Gastaldi and Giuliano Carnimeo. It is loosely based on the crimes of the Italian serial killer known as "the Monster of Florence".

== Plot ==
A couple drives to a secluded lovers' lane on the outskirts of Florence to have sex. Both of them are gunned down by a gloved prowler, who then uses a knife and a tree branch to sexually mutilate the body of the female victim. The double homicide is the latest in a series of similar killings, perpetrated by an individual dubbed "Il Mostro" (The Monster). Christiana Marelli, a criminology student, is researching the serial killer for her thesis, to the dismay of her professor, the local police, and her doctor boyfriend, Alex.

As Christiana investigates Il Mostro, she begins receiving strange telephone calls and finds herself being shadowed by a stalker, who at one point attempts to break into her apartment while she is home alone. A bartender who had offered to meet with Christiana to provide her with information is later found hanged, and Christiana begins to suspect that her boyfriend is Il Mostro due to a combination of mounting circumstantial evidence, Alex's conspicuous absences during all of the murders, and the fact that she had told him about her planned rendezvous with the bartender shortly before he was found dead.

After a couple whom she knew personally is murdered by Il Mostro, Christiana attends a séance in the hope that it can summon the victims' spirits, and shed light on the killer's identity; she drops Alex off at a theatre showing a Hitchcock film along the way. During the ceremony, the medium has a vision of Il Mostro killing and butchering another couple while they are camping; when the male victim's throat is slashed, a similar wound appears on the medium's neck. Now paranoid and convinced that Alex is the killer, Christiana leaves the séance and rushes back to the theatre; she is relieved to find him there, quietly watching the movie with the other spectators. As she makes her way to the seat next to him, an unseen figure approaches her and settles into the seat opposite hers. A title card then appears on the film they are watching: "The killer is still among us."

The end credits are preceded by a message that the film was made as a warning to young people, and with the hope of assisting the police in apprehending real-life murderers.

== Cast ==
- Mariangela D'Abbraccio as Christiana Marelli
- Giovanni Visentin as Dr. Alex
- Riccardo Parisio Perrotti as Professor
- Luigi Mezzanotte as Dr. Franco M. Benincasa
- Yvonne D'Abbraccio as Chiara
- Francesco Capitano
- Oresto Antonio Rotundo as Commissioner
- Silvia D'Agostini
- Fabio Carfora as Birri
- Franco Adducci
- Marco Bertini
- Anna Pera
- Giuseppe Pelli
- Rosario Tizzano
- Roberto Sanna as Medium

== Reception ==
The Killer is Still Among Us was deemed "incredibly boring" in a retrospective Italian review, stating that, while the film did have "a few disturbing scenes", they were not enough to save it from the "banal dialogue" and "bad characters" that made it "a one way trip to dullsville".
