= To Rome with Love (film) =

- Theatrical release poster
- Directed by: Woody Allen
- Written by: Woody Allen
- Produced by: Letty Aronson; Stephen Tenenbaum; Giampaolo Letta; Faruk Alatan
- Starring: Woody Allen; Alec Baldwin; Roberto Benigni; Penélope Cruz; Judy Davis; Jesse Eisenberg; Greta Gerwig; Elliot Page (Note: Credited as Ellen Page; he came out as transgender in 2020.)
- Cinematography: Darius Khondji
- Edited by: Alisa Lepselter
- Production companies: Medusa Film; Gravier Productions; Perdido Production
- Distributed by: Medusa Distribuzione (Italy); Sony Pictures Classics (United States)
- Release dates: April 20, 2012 (Italy); June 22, 2012 (United States)
- Running time: 112 minutes
- Countries: United States; Italy; Spain
- Languages: Italian; English
- Budget: $17 million
- Box office: $73.2 million

To Rome with Love is a 2012 magical realist romantic comedy film written and directed by, and co-starring, Woody Allen in his first acting appearance since 2006. It is his most recent appearance in a film he directed. Set in Rome, the film was released in Italian theaters on April 13, 2012, and opened in Los Angeles and New York City on June 22, 2012.

The film features an ensemble cast and is told in four separate vignettes: a clerk who wakes up to find himself a celebrity, an architect who takes a trip back to the street he lived on as a student, a young couple on their honeymoon, and an Italian funeral director whose uncanny singing ability enraptures his soon to be in-law, an American opera director.

== Plot ==
Hayley's Story

American tourist Hayley becomes engaged to lawyer Michelangelo while spending a summer in Rome. Hayley's parents, Jerry and Phyllis, fly to Italy to meet her fiancé. During the visit, Michelangelo's mortician father Giancarlo sings in the shower and Jerry, a retired—and critically reviled—opera director, is inspired to bring his gift to the public. He convinces Giancarlo to audition in front of a room of opera bigwigs but Giancarlo performs poorly in this setting.

Jerry realizes Giancarlo's talent is tied to the comfort and freedom of the shower. He stages a concert in which Giancarlo performs at the Teatro dell'Opera while actually washing himself onstage in a shower. This is a great success, so Jerry and Giancarlo stage Pagliacci with an incongruous shower present in all scenes. Giancarlo receives rave reviews but retires from opera singing, preferring to work as a mortician and spend time with his family.

Antonio's Story

Newlyweds Antonio and Milly plan to move to Rome after his uncles offer him a job in their family business. Before meeting Antonio's relatives, Milly gets lost in Rome and loses her cell phone. Ending up at a film shoot, Milly meets Luca Salta, an actor she idolizes. Back at her hotel, Anna, a prostitute, is mistakenly sent to Antonio's room.

Before Antonio can clarify the misunderstanding, his relatives arrive. To save face, Antonio convinces Anna to pose as Milly. The group goes to lunch and then to a party. Antonio talks to Anna about how pure Milly is. Upon discovering Antonio was a virgin before meeting Milly, she seduces him in the bushes.

Luca takes Milly to his hotel room. She decides to have sex with him, but then an armed thief breaks in. Luca's wife and a private investigator show up. Milly and the thief climb into bed and fool Mrs. Salta into believing the room is theirs while Luca hides in the bathroom. Once his wife has left, Luca runs off. Milly has sex with the thief instead. After returning to the hotel room, she and Antonio decide to return to their rustic hometown—but first begin to make love.

Leopoldo's Story

Leopoldo lives a mundane life with his wife and two children until he wakes up one morning to discover he has become a national celebrity. Paparazzi document his every move, wanting to know everything about him. Leopoldo even becomes a manager at his company and begins dating models and attending prestigious events. The constant attention wears on him. One day, in the middle of an interview, the paparazzi spot a man "who looks more interesting" and abandon Leopoldo. At first, Leopoldo welcomes the return to his old life, but one afternoon he breaks down, missing the attention.

John's Story

John, a well-known architect, visits Rome with his wife and their friends. He had lived there some 30 years before, and would rather revisit his old haunts than go sightseeing with the others. Looking for his old apartment building, John meets American architecture student Jack, who recognizes him. Jack lives in John's old building, and invites him to the apartment he shares with his girlfriend Sally. Throughout the rest of the story, John appears as a quasi-real and quasi-imaginary figure around Jack and makes frank observations of events. Sally invites her best friend Monica to stay with them. Monica and Jack end up having an affair.

Jack plans to leave Sally and travel with Monica, but decides to wait until Sally finishes her midterms. When that day comes, Monica learns she has been cast in a Hollywood blockbuster. She forgets all about traveling with Jack, who realizes how shallow she is. John and Jack part ways.

== Cast ==
Grouped by storylines

=== "Hayley's Story" ===
- Alison Pill as Hayley, Michelangelo's fiancée
- Flavio Parenti as Michelangelo Santoli, Hayley's fiancé
- Woody Allen as Jerry, Hayley's father and Phyllis' husband
- Judy Davis as Phyllis, Hayley's mother and Jerry's wife
- Fabio Armiliato as Giancarlo Santoli, Michelangelo's father

=== "Leopoldo's Story" ===
- Roberto Benigni as Leopoldo Pisanello, a clerk and temporary celebrity
- Monica Nappo as Sofia Pisanello, Leopoldo's wife
- Cecilia Capriotti as Serafina, a secretary
- Marta Zoffoli as Marisa Raguso, an interviewer for Leopoldo

=== "Antonio's Story" ===
- Alessandro Tiberi as Antonio, Milly's husband
- Alessandra Mastronardi as Milly, Antonio's wife
- Penélope Cruz as Anna, a prostitute
- Simona Caparrini as Giovanna, Antonio's aunt
- Ornella Muti as Pia Fusari, a famous actress
- Antonio Albanese as Luca "Luchino" Salta, a famous actor
- Riccardo Scamarcio as hotel thief
- Roberto Della Casa as Uncle Paolo
- Giuliano Gemma as hotel manager

=== "John's Story" ===
- Alec Baldwin as John Foy, successful architect and Jack's acquaintance and adviser
- Jesse Eisenberg as Jack, Sally's boyfriend
- Greta Gerwig as Sally, Jack's girlfriend and Monica's best friend
- Elliot Page as Monica, Sally's best friend
- Lino Guanciale as Leonardo

=== Other cast ===
- Cristiana Palazzoni, the TG3 anchorwoman, is a real-life journalist of the Italian network Rai 3. The scene is shot in the real TG3 studio.
- Pierluigi Marchionne, who plays a traffic policeman in the initial sequence, is a real Rome policeman. Woody Allen saw him directing traffic in Piazza Venezia and added that scene for him to be in.

== Production ==
To Rome with Love tells four unrelated stories taking place in Rome. Antonio's story is a direct copy with some amendments of an entire Federico Fellini film, The White Sheik (1952), written by Fellini, Tullio Pinelli and Ennio Flaiano.

Financial backing for To Rome with Love came from distributors in Rome who offered to finance a film for Allen as long as it was filmed in Rome. Allen accepted, seeing the offer as a way to work in the city and "get the money to work quickly and from a single source". The four vignettes featured in the film were based on ideas and notes he had written throughout the year before he wrote the script. The vignettes featured in the film deal with the theme of "fame and accomplishment", although Allen stated that he did not intend for them to have any thematic connection. He initially named the film Bop Decameron, a reference to the 14th century book by Italian author Giovanni Boccaccio, but several people did not understand the reference, so he retitled it Nero Fiddles. The new title was still met with confusion, so he settled on the final title To Rome with Love, although he has stated that he hates this title.

== Release ==
In December 2011, Sony Pictures Classics acquired distribution rights to the film.

=== Box office ===
To Rome with Love was a box office success. It earned $16.7 million in the United States and $73.2 million worldwide.

=== Critical reception ===
The film has generally received mixed reviews from critics. The review aggregator Rotten Tomatoes gives the film a score of 47% based on reviews from 177 critics with an average score of 5.4/10. Its critical consensus reads: "To Rome With Love sees Woody Allen cobbling together an Italian postcard of farce, fantasy, and comedy with only middling success." Metacritic gives the film an average score of 54 out of 100, and thus "mixed or average reviews", based on 38 professional critics. Roger Ebert gave the film 3 stars out of 4, writing: "To Rome With Love generates no particular excitement or surprise, but it provides the sort of pleasure he seems able to generate almost on demand."

A. O. Scott of The New York Times found some of the scenes "rushed and haphazardly constructed" and some of the dialogue "overwritten and under-rehearsed", but also recommended it, writing "One of the most delightful things about To Rome With Love is how casually it blends the plausible and the surreal, and how unabashedly it revels in pure silliness." On the other hand, David Denby of The New Yorker thought the film was "light and fast, with some of the sharpest dialogue and acting that he's put on the screen in years."

In 2016, film critics Robbie Collin and Tim Robey ranked it as one of the worst movies by Woody Allen.

=== Controversies ===
On November 10, 2017, Elliot Page described working on To Rome with Love as the "biggest regret" of his career, referring to sexual abuse allegations made by Allen's adopted daughter Dylan Farrow. Page said he felt pressured by others who told him, "of course you have to say yes to this Woody Allen film." In January 2018, Greta Gerwig said that she regretted working on the film.
