= Il mostro di Firenze (miniseries) =

- Genre: Thriller; Mystery
- Directed by: Antonello Grimaldi
- Starring: Nicole Grimaudo; Ennio Fantastichini; Marit Nissen; Giorgio Colangeli; Bebo Storti; Marco Giallini; Corso Salani; Giovanni Bissaca; Stefano Scherini
- Composer: Massimiliano Annibaldi
- Country of origin: Italy
- No. of seasons: 1
- No. of episodes: 6

Production
- Cinematography: Alessandro Pesci

Original release
- Network: Fox Crime
- Release: November 12 – December 10, 2009

Il mostro di Firenze ("The Monster of Florence") is a 2009 Italian six parts thriller television miniseries directed by Antonello Grimaldi. It depicts actual events surrounding the murders of the Monster of Florence and the investigation to discover his identity.

== Main cast ==
- Ennio Fantastichini as Renzo Rontini
- Nicole Grimaudo as Silvia Della Monica
- Marit Nissen as Winnie Rontini
- Giorgio Colangeli as Michele Giuttari
- Bebo Storti as Pierluigi Vigna
- Marco Giallini as Ruggero Perugini
- Tiziana Di Marco as Pia Rontini
- Corso Salani as Paolo Canessa
- Massimo Sarchielli as Pietro Pacciani
- Massimo Bianchi as Giancarlo Lotti
- Francesco Burroni as Mario Vanni
- Stefano Gragnani as Lorenzo Nesi
- Giacomo Carolei as Claudio Stefanacci
- Simona Caparrini as Daniela Stefanacci
- Duccio Camerini as Mario Rotella
- Sergio Albelli as Patrizio Pellegrini
- Pietro De Silva as Pietro Fioravanti
- Luigi Petrucci as Giuliano Mignini
- Vanni Fois as Stefano Mele
- Edoardo Gabbriellini as Natalino Mele
- Pietro Fornaciari as Piero Mucciarini
- Sandro Ghiani as Giovanni Mele
- Sergio Forconi as Mauro Poggiali
- Antonello Grimaldi as Francesco Bruno
- Daria Nicolodi as La sensitiva
