= The Monster of Florence: A True Story =

2008 book by Douglas Preston with Mario Spezi

The Monster of Florence: a True Story
- Front cover
- Author: Douglas Preston; Mario Spezi
- Language: English
- Genre: True crime
- Publisher: Grand Central Publishing
- Publication date: June 10, 2008
- Publication place: United States
- Media type: Print (Hardcover)
- Pages: 336
- ISBN: 978-0-446-58119-6

The Monster of Florence: A True Story is a 2008 true crime book by American thriller writer Douglas Preston and Italian journalist Mario Spezi. It relates to a series of murders that occurred between 1968 and 1985 and involved couples who were killed while having sex in their cars in deserted lanes around the city of Florence in the Italian region of Tuscany.

== Background ==
Preston, an author of fiction and non-fiction books, moved to Florence with his family and became interested in the Monster of Florence case because the murders had taken place in the surrounding countryside. Mario Spezi, co-author of the book, is a journalist who specialized in the Monster of Florence case for many years. Preston and Spezi became friends and then collaborated on articles and books about the case. Both became figures in the case when the Italian prosecutors came to suspect them and accuse them of crimes including obstruction of justice and potentially being accomplices to murder. Preston published an article about the case in American magazine The Atlantic in 2006.

== Summary ==
It recounts the authors' personal experiences while investigating the case and their experience of being subject to allegations by Italian prosecutors. Preston and Spezi have been outspoken critics of the tactics and theories pursued by police and prosecutors in the Monster of Florence case.

The book is stated as being an English translation of Spezi and Preston's Italian language book, [Dolci Colline di Sangue] (Sweet Hills of Blood) published two years earlier by Preston's Italian publisher, Sonzogno in 2006. Spezi wrote the majority of the Italian manuscript.

== Film version ==
In late 2008, film studio United Artists announced its purchase of the film rights to The Monster of Florence: a True Story. In 2010 the project was acquired by Fox 2000 and is in development, with George Clooney attached as producer as well as to play the role of Preston. However, Clooney has since dropped out of the project.

In July 2018, Preston announced that the director, Nikolaj Arcel, planned to start shooting in the spring of 2019. In June 2021, it was announced that actor Antonio Banderas will play the role of Spezi. Arcel will direct the 6-hour limited series, with scripts by Arcel and Anders Thomas Jensen.

== See also ==
- Censorship in Italy
- Monster of Florence
- Magdalen Nabb
- Zodiac killer
