= Ein Haus in der Toscana =

- Country of origin: Germany

Ein Haus in der Toscana is a German television series based on the experiences of the Donner family, consisting of the father Julius (Stefan Wigger), the mother Rosl (Renate Schroeter), their daughter Bea (Muriel Baumeister) and their son Markus (Oliver Clemens), from Freising in her holiday home in Tuscany.

== See also ==
- List of German television series
