= Mario Spezi =

Italian journalist and author (1945–2016)

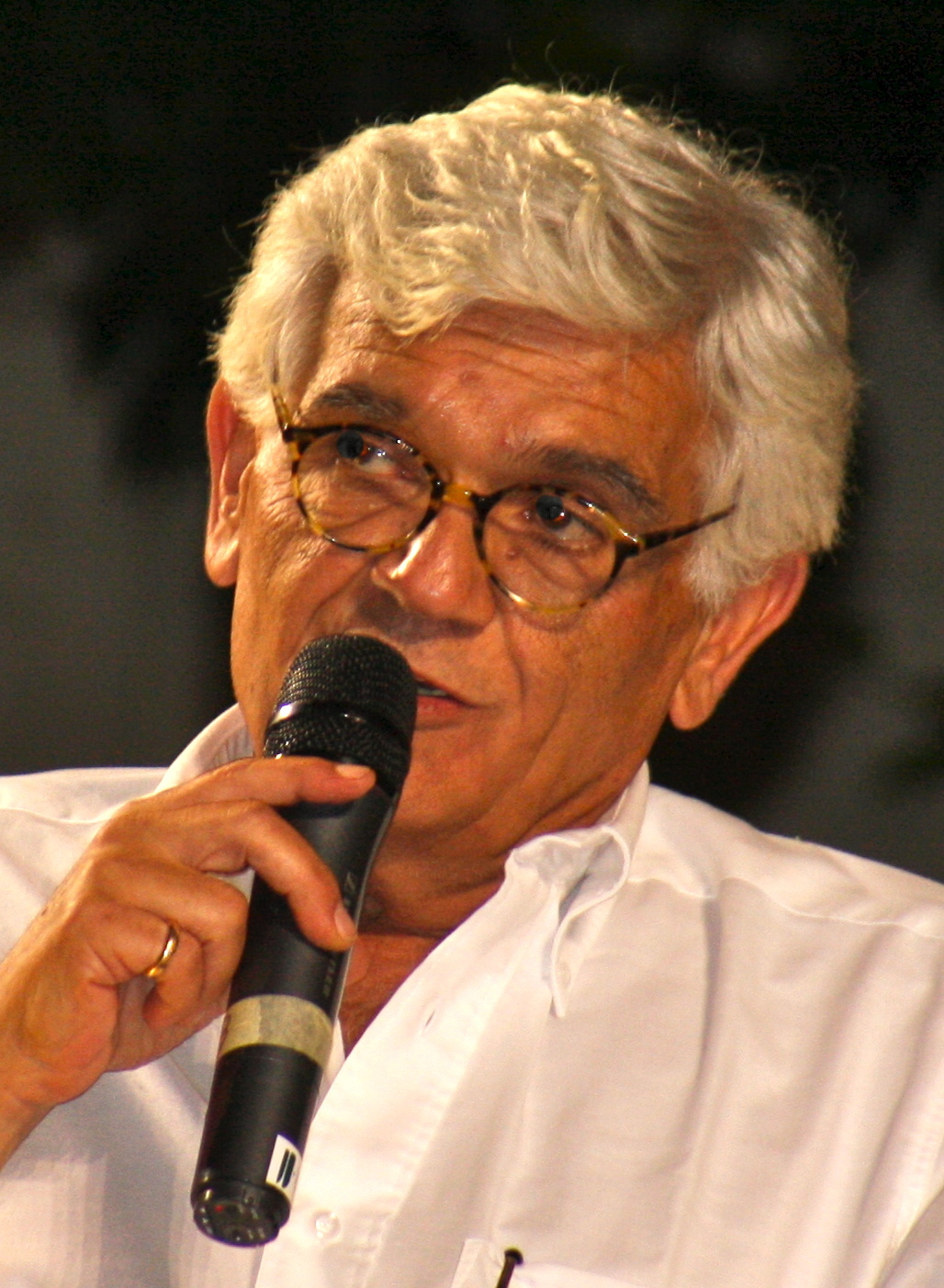
- Spezi in 2010
- Born: 30 July 1945; Sant'Angelo in Vado, Marche, Kingdom of Italy
- Died: 9 September 2016 (aged 71); Florence, Tuscany, Italy
- Occupations: Journalist, Paese Sera and La Nazione
- Spouse: Miriam Spezi
- Children: 1
- Writing career
- Language: Italian
- Notable work: The Monster of Florence (with Douglas Preston)

Mario Spezi (July 30, 1945 – September 9, 2016) was an Italian journalist, author, illustrator, and caricaturist. He wrote the non-fiction true crime books Dolci Colline di Sangue (2006) and Il Mostro di Firenze (1983). He was a co-author in the book The Monster of Florence A True Story (2008) with American author Douglas Preston. Additionally, he was credited by Preston for providing details used in the novel Brimstone.

Spezi spent much of his career as a crime reporter for the La Nazione newspaper in Florence, where he reported on the case of the notorious serial killer known as the Monster of Florence. He even spent 23 days in prison on charges of impeding the investigation by prosecutor Giuliano Mignini, though the charges were overturned on appeal. It was later decided that he was jailed illegally and without ample evidence of a crime.

Later, Spezi even apologized to Amanda Knox and Raffaele Sollecito in the case of the murder of Meredith Kercher, another of Mignini's cases.

Spezi also wrote the film Il Mostro Di Firenze (1986), based on his novel. The film aired in Italy and the United States.

Spezi was a Roman Catholic.

As a result of a long illness, Spezi died on September 9, 2016. Following his death, Mediaset, an Italian mass media company, described Spezi as journalist who was "able to tell a story and analyze the facts by digging deeper in places where other journalists were afraid to look."

== Selected works ==
=== In Italian ===
- Il Mostro Di Firenze (1983)
- Ritratti distratti: [catalogo della mostra a] Firenze, Loggia Rucellai, maggio-giugno 1988 (1988)
- Dolci colline di sangue, with Douglas Preston (2006)

=== In English ===
- The Monster of Florence: A True Story ("Dolci colline di sangue") with Douglas Preston (2008)

=== In German ===
- Der Engel mit den Eisaugen with Douglas Preston, ed. Knaur, Germany (2008); on Amanda Knox case
