= Magdalen Nabb =

British author (1947–2007)

- Born: Magdalen Nuttal; 16 January 1947; Church, Lancashire, England
- Died: 18 August 2007 (aged 60); Florence, Italy
- Spouse: James Nabb (div.)
- Children: Liam
- Writing career
- Notable awards: Nestlé Smarties Book Prize (1991, 1993)

Magdalen Nabb (née Nuttal; 16 January 1947 – 18 August 2007) was a British author, best known for the Marshal Guarnaccia detective novels.

== Early life and education ==
Magdalen Nuttal was born in Church, Lancashire, on 16 January 1947, and was raised in Ramsbottom. She went by 'Magda' with her two sisters and parents. Both of her parents' died while she was in childhood; her father died of rheumatic fever at age 32 when she was 7, and her mother died suddenly when Nuttal was 13. She and her sisters moved in with their aunt, but within two weeks, their uncle died.

Nuttal attended the Convent Grammar School in Bury, Greater Manchester, then attended an art college in Manchester, where she studied arts and pottery.

== Career ==
Nabb began her career teaching art at a primary school in Holcombe, Greater Manchester.

After moving to Florence in 1975, Nabb initially worked as a grape-picker and a potter before she began writing. Soon, she began working at Casa Guidi, descriptions of which she used in her first novel; she also met the physical model for Marshal Guarnaccia. Her first book, Death of an Englishman, was first published in 1981. Belgian writer Georges Simenon was impressed with the novel and reached out to Nabb, who had admired Simenon's work; the two became lifelong friends. Nabb subsequently published 12 additional crime detective novels, all of which are set in Florence, which she describes as a "very secret city". She lived near enough to the Carabinieri station at Pitti to stroll there regularly and have a chat with the marshal, who kept her up to date on crime in the city. Her final novel, Vita Nuova in the Marshal Guarnaccia series, was posthumously published in 2008.

In addition to her novels intended for adults, Nabb wrote 12 Josie Smith books for children, all of which are set in Ramsbottom in the school Nabb attended. In 1991, Jose Smith and Eileen, the second book in the series, won the Nestlé Smarties Book Prize. She also wrote two unrelated children's books, The Enchanted Horse and Twilight Ghost. The former won the 1993 Nestlé Smarties Book Prize.

Nabb also occasionally wrote journalistic pieces for English, German and Italian papers.

== Philanthropy ==
Nabb donated and raised funds for the Brooke Hospital for Animals, a UK-based international equine charity. All royalties from her 1993 book The Enchanted Horse were donated to the charity. In 2005, she raised money by riding across Kenya for six hours daily.

In the mid-2000s, Nabb helped residents in Afghanistan, first by supporting a school for Afghan refugee children, then financing a well to provide fresh water.

== Personal life ==
Nuttal married James Nabb, though the marriage was brief. The couple had a son, Liam.

In 1975, Nabb moved to Florence with her son, Liam, and her new companion, poet Nigel Thompson.

In 1994, Nabb suffered a stroke but recovered.

Nabb died in Florence of a stroke at age 60 on 18 August 2007.

== Publications ==
=== Books for adults ===
==== Standalone books ====
- Co-written with Paolo Vagheggi: The Prosecutor. New York: St. Martin's Press. 1987. ISBN 978-0-312-01497-1.
- Cosimo. Diogenes. 2004. ISBN 978-3-257-23551-7.

==== Maresciallo Guarnaccia series ====
- Death of an Englishman. Scribners. 1981.
- Death of a Dutchman. Scribners. 1982.
- Death in Springtime. Scribners. 1983.
- Death in Autumn. New York: C. Scribner's. 1985. ISBN 978-0-684-18337-4.
- The Marshal and the Murderer. New York: Scribner. 1987. ISBN 978-0-684-18884-3.
- The Marshal and the Madwoman. New York: Scribner. 1988. ISBN 978-0-684-18984-0.
- The Marshal's Own Case. New York: Scribner. 1990. ISBN 978-0-684-19201-7.
- The Marshal Makes His Report. Crime Club. 1991. ISBN 978-0-00-232332-1.
- The Marshal at the Villa Torrini. New York: HarperCollins. 1993. ISBN 978-0-06-016915-2.
- The Monster of Florence. New York: Soho Crime. 2013. ISBN 978-1-61695-324-9.
- Property of Blood. New York: SOHO. 2001. ISBN 978-1-56947-251-4.
- Some Bitter Taste. New York: Soho Press. 2002. ISBN 978-1-56947-317-7.
- The Innocent. New York: Soho Press. 2005. ISBN 978-1-56947-414-3. OCLC 60543306.
- Vita Nuova. New York: Soho. 2008. ISBN 978-1-56947-493-8. OCLC 174138965.

=== Books for children ===
==== Standalone books ====
- The Enchanted Horse. Orchard Books. 1993. ISBN 978-0-531-06805-2. Illustrated by Julek Heller.
- Twilight Ghost. Collins. 2002. ISBN 978-0-00-713397-0.

==== Josie Smith series ====
The Josie Smith books are illustrated by Pirkko Vainio and published by Margaret K. McElderry Books in New York.

- Josie Smith. 1989. ISBN 978-0-689-50485-3.
- Josie Smith at the Seashore. 1990. ISBN 978-0-689-50492-1.
- Josie Smith and Eileen. M.K. McElderry Books. 1992. ISBN 978-0-689-50534-8.
- Josie Smith at School. 1991. ISBN 978-0-689-50533-1.
- Josie Smith at Christmas. 1992. ISBN 978-0-00-674537-2.
- Josie Smith in Hospital. 1993. ISBN 978-0-00-674720-8.
- Josie Smith at the Market. 1995. ISBN 978-0-00-675064-2.
- Josie Smith in Winter. 1999. ISBN 978-0-006-75407-7.
- Josie Smith in Spring. 2000. ISBN 978-0-754-07802-9.
- Josie Smith in Summer. 2000. ISBN 978-0-006-75409-1.
- Josie Smith in Autumn. 2000. ISBN 978-0-006-75410-7.
