= Monster of Florence =

Serial killer in Italy active from 1968 to 1985

The Monster of Florence
- Composite sketch of the suspect in 1981
- Other names: Il maniaco delle coppiette (The Maniac of Couples), il Mostro (The Monster)
- Capture status: Judicial measures: Pietro Pacciani convicted in first instance in 1994, acquitted on appeal in 1996, and died before being subjected to a new appeal trial; Mario Vanni and Giancarlo Lotti convicted in final instance in 2000 of four of the eight double murders committed; Francesco Calamandrei tried with abbreviated procedure and acquitted in 2008

Details
- Victims: 16
- Span of crimes: 21 August 1968 – 8 September 1985
- Country: Italy

The Monster of Florence (Italian: il Mostro di Firenze) is the name coined by the Italian press for a serial killer active within the former province of Florence (now the Metropolitan City of Florence) between 1968 and 1985. The Monster murdered sixteen victims, usually young couples secluded in search of privacy, in wooded areas during new moons. Although none of the murders were committed in the city of Florence proper, the name of the killer, initially referred to as the Maniac of Couples (Italian: il maniaco delle coppiette), was chosen due to the murders being committed in the surrounding countryside. After an investigation was launched in the early 1990s by the Florence Prosecutor's Office, several connected persons were convicted for involvement in the murders, yet the exact sequence of events, the identity of the main perpetrator and the motive remain unclear.

Multiple weapons were used in the murders, including a .22 caliber handgun and a knife, and in half of the cases a large portion of the skin surrounding sexual organs was excised from the bodies of the female victims. The Monster represented the first known case of serial murders against couples in Italy; often being called the country's first modern serial killer case; and received a vast media coverage both at the time of the crimes and during the various trials against the alleged perpetrators, to the point of influencing the habits and daily life of the entire Florentine population, who began to avoid secluding themselves in isolated places. The fact that the victims were young couples also stimulated debate in the media on granting adolescents the opportunity to find privacy at home more freely, thus avoiding the lure of isolated and dangerous places.

Law enforcement conducted several investigations into the murders over many years. In 1996, Italy's Supreme Court of Cassation in final instance annulled the acquittal on appeal of Pietro Pacciani and sent the case back to another section of the Florence Court of Assizes of Appeal for a new second-instance trial, which was not held due to Pacciani's death in 1998. In 2000, the Supreme Court of Cassation convicted in final instance Mario Vanni and Giancarlo Lotti for five and four of the eight double murders, respectively. They had been charged with being part of an alleged group of murderers that became known in the popular press as the Snack Buddies (Italian: compagni di merende) following the courtroom protestation of Vanni that the group were merely friends who would frequently get together in local bars and restaurants for meals. Lotti had confessed to the murders and called in Pacciani and Vanni as accomplices; Lotti and Fernando Pucci's testimonies were decisive for the convictions, while Giovanni Faggi was acquitted.

Beyond what was established by the final sentence of 2000, physical evidence such as DNA and fingerprints attributable to the Monster's accomplices have never been found at the numerous crime scenes, the killer's firearm (a presumed Beretta handgun with which he signed his crimes) has never been traced and the anatomical parts removed from some of his female victims have not been found; in 1985, the Florence Prosecutor's Office received a letter including the breast flap of a victim. Since the 1990s and 2000s, prosecutors in Florence and Perugia (after the suspicious death of Francesco Narducci in Lake Trasimeno) have engaged in numerous investigations aimed at identifying both the material perpetrators and possible instigators of the murders. The investigations have also focused on a possible motive of an esoteric nature, which would have pushed one or more people to commission of the crimes, without arriving at any objective confirmation. Despite the many investigations and hypotheses made over the years, including in the 2010s and 2020s, the case remains unsolved.

== Overview ==
Of the more than 4,000 serial killers documented since the 1950s, only about ten have chosen to target couples. Of these ten, only four have adopted a similar if not identical modus operandi and victimology (young secluded lovers, first shot with a handgun): the "Couples Killer" Werner Boost, the Zodiac Killer, the "Son of Sam" David Berkowitz, and the Monster of Florence. Between 1974 and 1985, seven double murders were committed, all of which had in common the fact that the victims were killed at lovers' lanes, or couples who were secluded or in any case settled in an isolated place in the wooded areas (except in 1983) of the province of Florence; the weapon used was always a .22 caliber Beretta handgun with the same type of bullets, namely Winchester ammunition marked with the letter H on the base of the cartridge case, and they were always committed on dark nights during summer weekends (except in October 1981) and new moons, or in any case before a non-working day. As a result of the serial murders, the attitude of the population living in the province of Florence changed as the authorities appealed to the local population to be careful and avoid lovers' lanes, including flyers telling couples to avoid having sex in cars, as the Monster could kill again.

A double murder with the same modus operandi was committed in 1968 to which Stefano Mele, the husband of one of the two victims, had confessed and was definitively convicted in 1973; however, due to the dynamics and the weapon used, it was later hypothesized that it could instead be connected to the Monster of Florence and the serial murders of the 1970s and 1980s. In 1982, cartridge cases and bullets fired from the serial killer's handgun were found attached to the file on the 1968 double murder where it is believed that the same handgun had been used, a discovery that led to the connection with the murders attributed up to that point to the Monster. In each crime, the male victim was hit first. Next, the killer focused on the female victim, who was then generally taken out of the car and stabbed with a knife and subjected to excisions in the pubic area and left breast; in four of the double murders, the killer removed the pubic area of the female victims using a bladed weapon, and in the last two cases he also cut off and removed the left breast from the bodies. Often the victims, especially the male ones, also suffered post-mortem stab wounds.

The crimes were committed on dirt country roads or hidden wooded areas frequented by couples in the surroundings of Florence (Signa in August 1968, Borgo San Lorenzo in September 1974, Scandicci in June 1981, Calenzano in October 1981, Baccaiano in June 1982, Giogoli in September 1983, Vicchio in July 1984, and Scopeti in September 1985). The investigations were long and complex, and led to the identification of two perpetrators for the crimes of 1982, 1983, 1984, and 1985, Mario Vanni and Giancarlo Lotti, who were respectively definitely sentenced in 2000 to life imprisonment and 26 years; another suspect, Pietro Pacciani, was acquitted on appeal in 1996 and died in 1998, before being able to undergo a new trial. Many people, including journalists and magistrates, disagree with the sentences, that the perpetrators were caught, or that the case is closed, and thus consider that the real perpetrator has not been found and that the case remains unsolved; the case itself is not officially closed due to further investigations.

== Murders ==
=== Lo Bianco and Locci ===
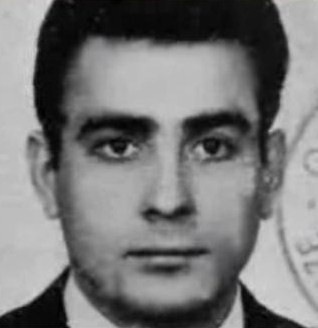
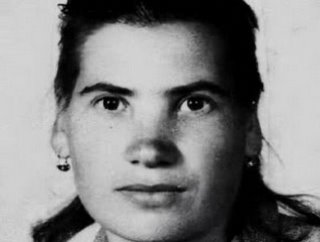
Victims Antonio Lo Bianco and Barbara Locci

On the night of 21 August 1968, masonry worker Antonio Lo Bianco (29) and homemaker Barbara Locci (32) were shot to death with a .22 caliber handgun in Signa, a small town west of Florence. The couple were attacked in their car while Locci's son, Natalino Mele (6), lay asleep in the back seat. Upon waking up and finding his mother dead, the child fled in fright and reached a nearby house. Locci, a native of Sardinia, had been well known in the town, receiving the nickname ape regina ("Queen Bee"). Her older husband, Stefano Mele, was eventually charged with the murder and spent six years in prison. While he was imprisoned, another couple was murdered, apparently with the same gun. Several lovers of Locci's were suspected to be perpetrators of the crime. Mele stated on several occasions that one of them had killed Locci but no evidence was found, as other murders were committed while they were in prison; after he was convicted in 1970 and sentenced to 14 years for the double murder by the Perugia Court, Mele was released after this murder was connected to the Monster of Florence.

In 1982, the murders of Lo Bianco and Locci were linked to the subsequent double murders based on a tip from an anonymous writer, who had possibly signed himself Un cittadino amico ("a friendly citizen") in a letter to police. On 20 July 1982, examining magistrate Vincenzo Tricomi found five bullets and five shell casings inappropriately stored in a folder among records of Mele's case file. Authorities were unable to reconstruct the chain of custody of those pieces of evidence and did not request a scientific comparison, even though it would have been necessary to check whether they matched the ballistic report from 1968. As the spent cartridges were fired by a gun used in four similar crimes, their presence in Mele's case file suggested to law enforcement officers that the perpetrator of the double murders in the 1970s and 1980s was connected with them.

=== Gentilcore and Pettini ===
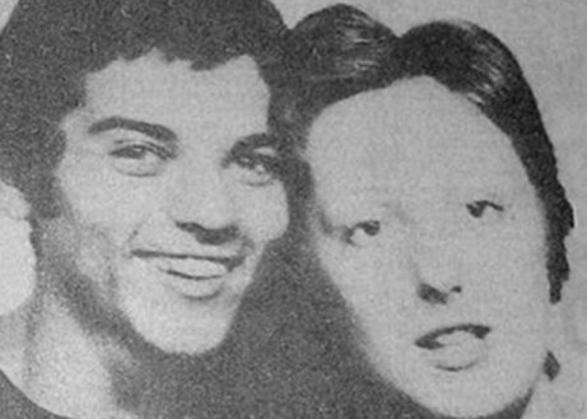
Victims Pasquale Gentilcore and Stefania Pettini

On 15 September 1974, teenage couple Pasquale Gentilcore (19), a barman, and Stefania Pettini (18), an accountant, were shot and stabbed in a country lane near Borgo San Lorenzo while having sex in Gentilcore's Fiat 127. They were not far from a notorious discotheque called Teen Club, where they were supposed to have been spending the evening with friends. Pettini's corpse had been violated with a grapevine stalk and disfigured with 97 stab wounds. Some hours before the murder, Pettini had disclosed to a close friend that a strange man was terrifying her. Another friend of Pettini's recalled that a strange man had followed and bothered the two of them during a driving lesson a few days before. Several couples who used to park in the same area where Gentilcore and Pettini were murdered stated that that particular area was frequented by voyeurs, a pair of them acting very oddly.

=== Foggi and De Nuccio ===
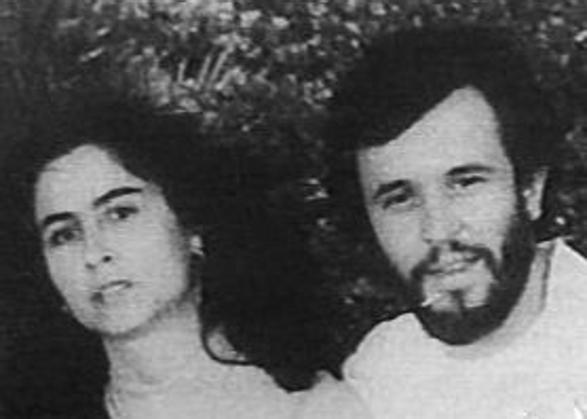
Carmela De Nuccio and Giovanni Foggi

On 6 June 1981, warehouseman Giovanni Foggi (30) and shop assistant Carmela De Nuccio (21) were shot and stabbed near Scandicci, where the engaged couple both lived. De Nuccio's body was pulled out of the car, and the killer cut out her pubic area with a notched knife. The next morning, a young voyeur, paramedic Enzo Spalletti (30), spoke about the murder before the corpses had been discovered. He spent three months in jail and was charged with murder before the perpetrator exonerated him by killing again.

=== Baldi and Cambi ===
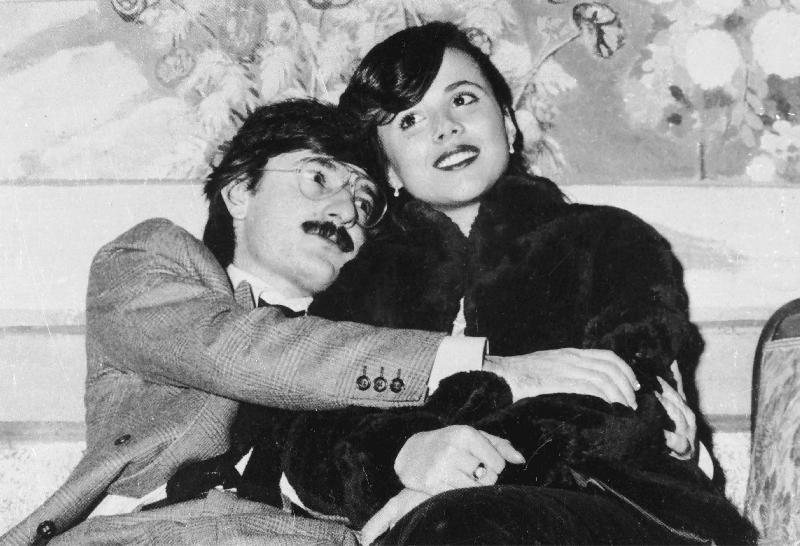
Stefano Baldi and Susanna Cambi

On 23 October 1981, workman Stefano Baldi (26) and telephonist Susanna Cambi (24), who were engaged, were shot and stabbed in a park in the vicinity of Calenzano. Cambi's pubic area was cut out like De Nuccio's. An anonymous caller phoned Cambi's mother the morning after the murder to "talk to her about her daughter". A few days before the murder, Cambi had told her mother that somebody was tormenting her and even chasing her by car.

=== Mainardi and Migliorini ===
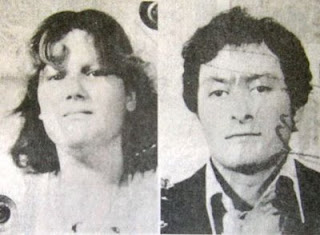
Antonella Migliorini and Paolo Mainardi

On 19 June 1982, mechanic Paolo Mainardi (22) and dressmaker Antonella Migliorini (20) were shot to death just after having sex in Mainardi's car on a provincial road in Montespertoli. This time, the killer did not have the time to mutilate the female victim, as the road was relatively busy. Several passing motorists had seen the car parked at the side of the road after its interior light had turned on. Mainardi was still alive when found; he died some hours later in hospital due to serious injuries. After this double murder, the investigators connected it to the other four double murders, including the one from 1968. Mainardi is believed to have heard or seen the killer approaching and attempted to drive away, only to lose control of his car and drive into a ditch on the other side of the road. Another reconstruction of the events suggests that, after shooting the couple, the killer drove Mainardi's car for a few meters to hide the vehicle and the bodies in a woodland area nearby, only to lose control of the car and abandon it in the ditch where it was discovered by a motorist only a few minutes later.

=== Meyer and Rüsch ===
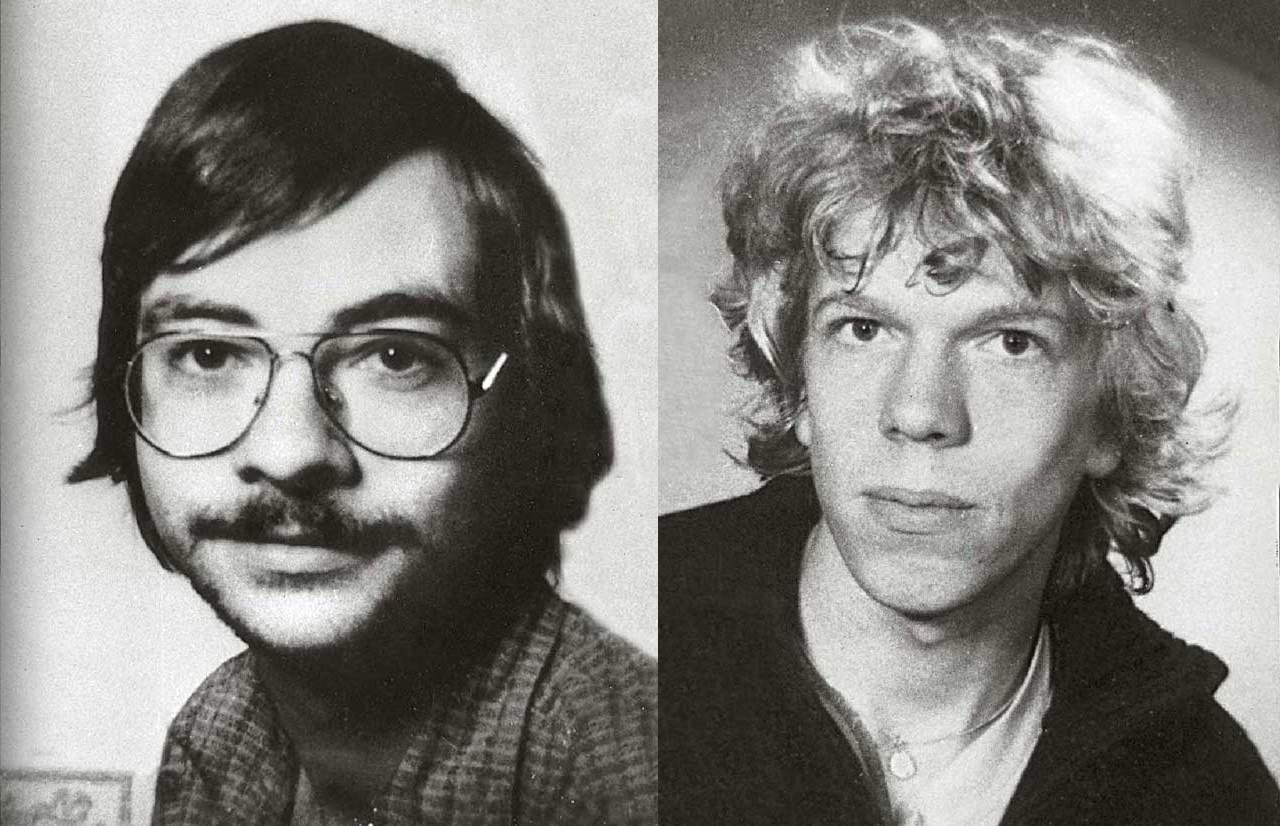
Wilhelm Friedrich Horst Meyer and Jens Uwe Rüsch

On 9 September 1983, Wilhelm Friedrich Horst Meyer (24) and Jens Uwe Rüsch (24), two students from Osnabrück, West Germany, were visiting Italy to celebrate an important scholarship Meyer had just won. They were found shot to death in their Volkswagen Samba Bus in Galluzzo. Rüsch's long blond hair and slim build could have deceived the killer into thinking he was a woman. Police suspected that the students were gay lovers based on pornographic materials found at the scene.

=== Stefanacci and Rontini ===
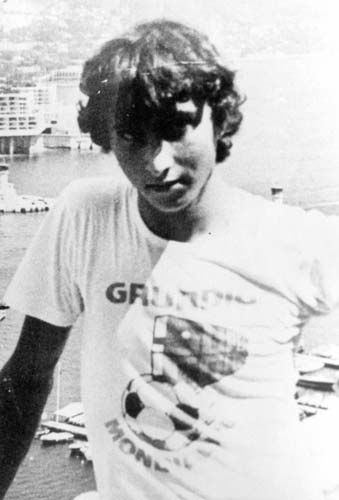
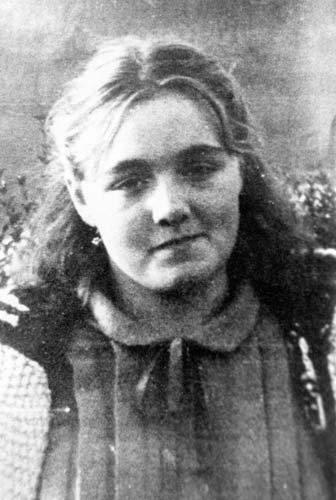
Claudio Stefanacci and Pia Rontini

On 29 July 1984, law student Claudio Stefanacci (21) and barmaid Pia Gilda Rontini (18) were shot and stabbed in Stefanacci's Fiat Panda parked in a woodland area near Vicchio. The killer removed Rontini's pubic area and left breast. There were reports of a strange man who had been following the couple in an ice cream parlour some hours before the murder. A close friend of Rontini recalled that she had confided that she had been bothered by "an unpleasant man" while working at the bar.

=== Kraveichvili and Mauriot ===
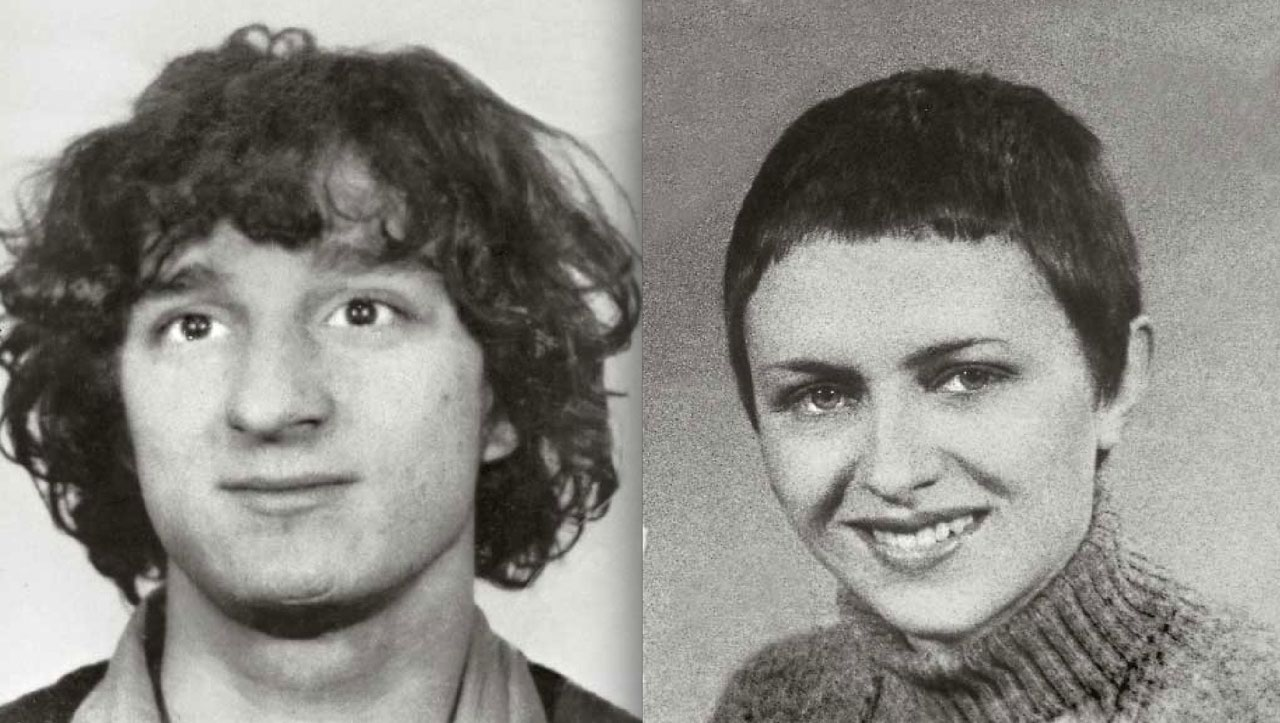
Jean Michel Kraveichvili and Nadine Mauriot

On the night of 7–8 September 1985, Jean Michel Kraveichvili (25), a musician of Georgian ancestry, and tradeswoman Nadine Mauriot (36), both from Audincourt, France, were shot and stabbed while sleeping in their small tent in a woodland area near San Casciano in Val di Pesa. Kraveichvili was killed a short distance away from the tent while trying to escape. Mauriot's body was mutilated. Because the killer had murdered two foreigners, there was not yet a missing persons report. A few days after the discovery of the bodies, a piece of the woman's breast was sent to the Florence Prosecutor's Office in an anonymous envelope addressed to Silvia Della Monica, the prosecutor in charge of the investigation. The killer had sent the taunting note and a piece of evidence to show that a murder had taken place and challenged local authorities to find the victims. A person picking mushrooms in the area discovered the bodies a few hours before the letter arrived on Della Monica's desk.

== Suspects and reaction ==
Journalist Mario Spezi coined the moniker "Monster of Florence". It was not until the Foggi–De Nuccio murders in 1981 that the police realized the killings were connected. A newspaper article about the Gentilcore–Pettini murder from 1974 caused the police to perform a ballistics test and confirm the same gun had been used in both murders.

=== Sardinian trail ===
After the 1982 murders, police leaked false information that Mainardi had regained consciousness before dying in the hospital. Soon after, an anonymous tip called for the police to relook at the Lo Bianco–Locci murder from 1968; it was quickly determined that the same gun had been used. The confession and conviction of Locci's husband, Stefano Mele, was subsequently revisited, as Mele had been imprisoned during the later murders. Mele's statements in police interviews were inconsistent, shifting the blame among his Sardinian relatives and acquaintances.

This line of investigation has become known in the Italian press and literature about the case as the Sardinian trail (Italian: pista sarda). Francesco Vinci was arrested first. He was a former lover of Locci's whose car had been found hidden on the day the false Mainardi information had been leaked. Francesco was kept in custody for over a year, even during the 1983 murders. Examining magistrate Mario Rotella instead widened the net, arresting Mele's brother and brother-in-law, Giovanni Mele and Piero Mucciarini. The 1984 murders occurred when the three suspects were in custody, so the police released them.

Rotella focused on Francesco's brother Salvatore Vinci, another lover, and former lodger of Barbara Locci's. Vinci's first wife had died in a fire in Sardinia, ruled a suicide although rumoured to be a murder. After the final Monster murder in 1985, Rotella arrested Vinci and charged him with the murder of his wife, intending to move from there to the other killings attributed to the Monster. The trial in Sardinia instead acquitted Vinci, who walked free. By this point, chief prosecutor Pier Luigi Vigna thought the Sardinian trail was spent, and wanted to look into the possibility of the gun having been picked up by an unknown party after its use in the 1968 murder. In 1989, Rotella was forced to officially clear all the Sardinian suspects and withdraw from the case.

=== Snack Buddies ===
With the use of computer analysis and anonymous tips, a new suspect, Pietro Pacciani, was found. Pacciani had been convicted both for rape and domestic abuse of his two daughters, and for the 1951 murder of a man who had relations with his ex-girlfriend, for which he served thirteen years in prison. Anti-Monster task force chief Ruggero Perugini found incriminating evidence, such as similarities between the 1951 murder and the Monster killings, as well as a reproduction of Primavera by Sandro Botticelli and another painting thought to be by Pacciani. The only physical evidence against Pacciani was an unfired bullet of the same brand as the Monster's and racked out of the same gun, found in Pacciani's garden at the end of a lengthy search. Pacciani was controversially convicted in the first-instance trial in 1994; he was given 14 life sentences for seven of the eight double homicides (1974, June and October 1981, 1982, 1983, 1984, and 1985), with daytime isolation for a duration of three years. At his appeal trial, the attorney general Piero Tony asked for Pacciani's acquittal, citing a lack of evidence and poor police work. As a result, Pacciani was acquitted and released in 1996. Perugini's successor Michele Giuttari tried to introduce new witnesses at the final hour but was denied. In December 1996, a new trial for Pacciani was ordered by the Supreme Court of Cassation; he died in 1998 before the new appeal trial could begin.

Mario Vanni, Giancarlo Lotti, and Giovanni Faggi were tried as Pacciani's accomplices. Vanni had been a witness at Pacciani's trial, where he famously claimed the two of them merely to be "Snack Buddies" (Italian: compagni di merende), a term that entered Italian vernacular. Lotti had been one of Giuttari's surprise witnesses, claiming to have seen Pacciani and Vanni commit the 1985 murder. After many more sessions of questioning, he had begun to incriminate himself in the murders, and both Vanni and Lotti were convicted in the first-instance trial in 1998. Vanni was sentenced to life imprisonment with daytime isolation for one year and additional penalties provided by law for five of the eight double homicides (October 1981, 1982, 1983, 1984, and 1985), while Lotti was sentenced to 30 years of imprisonment for four of the eight double homicides (1982, 1983, 1984, and 1985). Faggi, who had been charged for two of the eight double murders, was acquitted in the first instance and on appeal. In the same second-instance trial in 1999, Tony requested an acquittal for Vanni and Faggi and a sentence of 18 years of imprisonment, with the granting of mitigating circumstances and the mitigating circumstance of the minimum causal contribution, for Lotti; however, both convictions were confirmed, with only a reduction from one year to eight months for Vanni's daytime isolation, while Lotti's sentence was reduced to 26 years. In 2000, the Supreme Court of Cassation confirmed the appeal sentence. Pacciani's and the Snacks Buddies' sentences have been widely criticised, and many consider the murders to be unsolved.

The sentences convicting the "Snack Buddies" are mainly based on the much-discussed testimonies of Pucci and, above all, Lotti. This prevented the determination of a certain, organic, and global motive that could be considered valid for all crimes. In fact, Lotti, before mentioning the mysterious doctor, had changed his version several times as to the reasons why Pacciani and Vanni had killed. In 1996, Lotti declared that the crimes were "acts of anger due to sexual approaches that the victims had rejected". In 1997, he provided another version of the motive, stating that Pacciani's intention was to kill and then feed the fetishes to his daughters.

=== Satanic cult ===
In 2001, Giuttari, by now chief inspector for the police unit GIDES (Gruppo Investigativo Delitti Seriali, Investigative Group for Serial Crimes), announced that the crimes were connected to a satanic cult allegedly active in the Florence area. In his testimony, Lotti had spoken of a doctor who had hired Pacciani to commit the murders and collect the genitalia of the women for use in rituals. Giuttari justified this partly on the discovery of a pyramidal stone near a villa where Pacciani had been employed. The stone, Giuttari suggested, was indicative of cult activity. Critics, such as Spezi, found this idea laughable, given that such stones are commonly used as doorstops in the surrounding area. The villa was searched but nothing was found. The acquaintances of Pacciani and Vanni during the years of the murders fueled a line of investigation into possible esoteric motives and rites linked to satanism underlying the crimes. In particular, Pacciani and Vanni frequented Salvatore Indovino, a self-styled occultist and fortune teller originally from Catania, at a farmhouse located in the countryside of San Casciano, where according to testimonies, orgies and rites took place. During the searches carried out by the State Police at Pacciani's home, at least three books linked to black magic and Satanism were found.

This esoteric trail is linked to the large sums of money that Pacciani came into possession of during the years of the crimes, which gave rise to the idea that the "snack buddies" acted on behalf of personalities who remained unknown. The checks carried out by the State Police highlighted that Pacciani, before the crimes attributable to the Monster of Florence, was of modest means and had not inherited assets that could justify the sums of money considered for the most part out of league for a simple farmer like him. Mario Vanni also came to have important figures at his disposal, although to a much lesser extent than those of Pacciani. Pacciani, a modest farmer, even had 157 million lire at his disposal (corresponding in 1996 to €117,069.52 in 2018) in cash and interest-bearing postal vouchers, as well as having purchased a car, two houses and completely renovated his home. Arguments against Pacciani as a murderer hired by mysterious unknown instigators point out that the farmer, in addition to renting an apartment, carried out many odd jobs and was known for his stinginess, as underlined by Giuseppe Alessandri in the book La leggenda del Vampa (The Legend of Vampa). Furthermore, the alleged accomplice Lotti was far from rich given that in the 1980s and 1990s he found odd jobs and accommodation only thanks to the help of the town priest, being at all effects a destitute unemployed person. Even Vanni, despite the figures found in his accounts, died in a modest provincial retirement home. In 2010, Pier Luigi Vigna, former Florence prosecutor who dealt with the case, declared himself skeptical about the existence of a possible second level of instigators, demonstrating the fact that the investigations following those of the "Snacks Buddies" have not had any developments.

=== Narducci and secret society ===
Based on Lotti's statements regarding a doctor as one of the instigators, Michele Giuttari (the chief prosecutor of Perugia Giuliano Mignini) and Gabriella Carlizzi (editor-in-chief of the weekly magazine L'Altra Repubblica) speculated that a pharmacist, Francesco Calamandrei, and a deceased physician from Perugia, Francesco Narducci, had been involved in the secret society ordering Pacciani and the others. Calamandrei was put on trial while Narducci's body was exhumed. Narducci, a young doctor from a bourgeois family of Perugia, disappeared while on board his boat at Lake Trasimeno and was found dead in the lake a few days later on 13 October 1985, a month after the Monster's last double crime. Identification was handled by unorthodox means and burial was hastened according to magistrate Giuliano Mignini. In 2001, a telephone interception during an anti-usury investigation made references to the Monster of Florence and a satanic cult, leading the Perugia prosecutor's office to an investigation on the doctor's death due to the public gossip about him. While Mignini claimed the intercepted phone calls made references to Narducci, those did not occur until months after the investigation had been opened and its existence leaked to the public.

The Perugia Public Prosecutor's Office hypothesized that an unknown body was passed off as the deceased doctor at identification, and no post-mortem was carried out when the body was recovered from the lake. In June 2002, the buried body was exhumed and identified as Narducci, after which Mignini postulated a second body switch. A post-mortem was carried out, which demonstrated the presence of injuries compatible with strangulation. This directly contradicted the death certificate and the original news regarding Narducci's death reporting the causes of death as drowning. The Narducci family was investigated for criminal conspiracy and concealment of evidence. Furthermore, a friend of Narducci, the lawyer Alfredo Brizioli, was also accused of trying to force the medical examiner to draw up a false opinion on the doctor's death. The trial process ended with the complete acquittal sanctioned by the Supreme Court of Cassation. In the end, Calamandrei was completely exonerated, and nothing incriminating was found at the time regarding Narducci. During the trial, journalist Mario Spezi was arrested by Mignini. Spezi had been investigating his own favoured suspect, a son of Salvatore Vinci. Mignini claimed he did so to obstruct the investigation into Calamandrei and Narducci's sect, to which he claimed Spezi belonged. After international outcry, Spezi was set free, his arrest declared illegal. Giuttari and Mignini were indicted for abuse of office. GIDES was dissolved, and no active investigation of the Monster of Florence remains.

In 2018, the esoteric lead, and in particular the direct involvement of Narducci in the murders of the Monster of Florence, resurfaced during the investigation into the disappearance of Rossella Corazzin in the Belluno area in 1975, as stated in the final draft of the report of the bicameral Anti-Mafia Parliamentary Commission. The story originates from some statements by Angelo Izzo, one of the perpetrators of the Circeo massacre. The Anti-Mafia Parliamentary Commission stated that the evidential framework collected deserves further investigation.

=== Zodiac Killer ===
In 2017, journalist Francesco Amicone conducted an investigation on his own that led him to find a connection between the Monster of Florence and the Zodiac Killer cases. Amicone based his research also on the hypothesis of a possible connection between Zodiac and water proposed by Robert Graysmith in the book Zodiac.

Starting from 2018, Amicone's articles on the "Zodiac-Monster" connection have been published on tempi.it, the website of a magazine founded by his father Luigi Amicone, newspapers Il Giornale and Libero, and Amicone's blog ostellovolante.com. The story was also told in a podcast entitled "The Water Theory", produced by Italian movie distributor Lucky Red in 2023, and has been spread by other Italian media, including "Pulp Podcast" conducted by Italian rapper Fedez in 2025.

Amicone's suspect was Joseph "Joe" Bevilacqua (died on 23 December 2022), born in Totowa, New Jersey on 20 December 1935. Bevilacqua had a 20-year military career when he retired from the U.S. Army to move to Florence in July 1974. As an ABMC officer and then superintendent, Bevilacqua lived and worked at the Florence American Cemetery and Memorial, near the last Monster's crime scene, from 1974 to 1988. In 1994, he testified at the Pacciani trial. Bevilacqua denied knowing Pacciani at the time. However, in 2018, Amicone revealed to the detectives in charge of the Monster case and on Il Giornale that he had admitted to having known Pacciani since the 80s. This contradiction was then confirmed by Bevilacqua himself. According to Amicone, Bevilacqua may have been "Ulysses", an American cited by Mario Vanni as the real "Monster" in 2003, during a conversation in prison with his friend Lorenzo Nesi.

Between 26 May and 10 August 2017, Bevilacqua and Amicone had seven meetings of around two to three hours. During a phone call on 12 September 2017, Bevilacqua implied his responsibility in both the Monster of Florence and the Zodiac Killer cases, agreeing to Amicone's request to get a lawyer and turn himself in, before he later changed his mind. Citing professional ethics reasons, Amicone did not record the conversation. During the meetings in 2017, Bevilacqua told Amicone he was an undercover U.S. Army Criminal Investigation Command (CID) investigator operating in California at the time of Zodiac's activities in 1969 and 1970, and participated in the CID inquiry on the Khaki Mafia, which involved William O. Wooldridge (the then Sergeant Major of the Army), other Army sergeants, and firms from Los Angeles and the San Francisco Bay Area as well as in Reno, Nevada. Following a denunciation against Bevilacqua by Amicone dated 1 March 2018, his first articles on the "Monster–Zodiac connection" were published by Tempi (online) and Il Giornale (both print and online) in May 2018. Bevilacqua did not deny the biographical information published by Amicone, having the two signed in June 2017 a pro forma for the drafting of his biography; however, he denied the admission of guilt and filed a lawsuit. Amicone continued to accuse him, and claimed to have solved the four Zodiac's ciphers, revealing Bevilacqua's name.

According to Amicone's investigation, Bevilacqua might have had access to the case file of the 1968 double murder near Florence where bullets and shell casings had been improperly stored, and replaced the pieces of evidence with spent cartridges shot by the gun he would use in the Monster's homicides to link his future crimes to those murders for which he had an alibi. Italian authorities collected Bevilacqua's DNA in late 2020. In 1968, Bevilacqua was in Vietnam; according to Amicone, just as he could have gone from Saigon to San Francisco to commit the murders of David Arthur Faraday and Betty Lou Jensen as the Zodiac Killer, with 20 December being Bevilacqua's birthdate, he could have had access to Mele's trial file where bullets and shell casings of the Signa murder had been improperly stored and switch them to attribute the crime to himself. The hypothetical mislead would have taken place in the early 1970s when Bevilacqua was serving in Italy at Camp Darby. In 2021, Amicone attached to a supplement to the charges against Bevilacqua a report containing 21 interviews with ballistics experts and the results of a test at the range; according to the results, there was a 60 percent probability that the bullets of the 1968 case had been replaced and a 40 percent probability of the hypothetical wrong observation of the 1968 ballistic expert. According to Amicone, the report showed that the bullets and casings from the Monster's gun found in the Mele file may not be the same as in 1968, providing a reconstruction of the possible mislead.

In 2021, at the request of Florence assistant district attorney Luca Turco, the Bevilacqua case started by Amicone's statements and his journalistic investigation was dismissed. The magistrate pursued the charge for defamation for having stated that Bevilacqua admitted to being responsible for both the Monster of Florence and the Zodiac Killer's homicides. Bevilacqua died on 23 December 2022 in Sesto Fiorentino.

In 2020, researcher Valeria Vecchione identified the magazine (Gente, issue no. 51 of December 1984) from which the Monster had cut the letters for the letter mailed to deputy DA Silvia Della Monica in September 1985.

In 2025, Vecchione claimed to have been told that Bevilacqua, while he was hospitalized in Florence in June 2021, told a source from the medical staff that he was the Monster of Florence and that he had killed his first wife.

In November 2023, Amicone stated that Bevilacqua's DNA profile was sent to the authorities that investigate the Zodiac case. In December 2024, the journalist was convicted by the Florence court for the defamation. He was sentenced to a fine of €5,000 and to compensate Bevilacqua's wife and two of his daughters. According to judge Serafina Cannatà, the "Zodiac - Monster of Florence" connection would be a "bizarre theory" denied "by qualified investigative circles".

In March 2025, researcher Vecchione claimed on "Pulp Podcast" hosted by rapper Fedez to have been told that Bevilacqua, while he was hospitalized in Florence in June 2021, would have said to a source of the medical staff that he was the Monster of Florence and that he would have killed his first wife. The podcast also released an Amicone's statement informing the public that there would be an ongoing police investigation into Bevilacqua both in the United States and Italy. The investigation would have been started by the Californian law enforcement departments in charge of the Zodiac case after having received Bevilacqua's DNA profile from Amicone in late 2023. The existence of such an investigation has neither been confirmed nor denied by the authorities so far.

== In popular culture ==
Due to his serial murders and the complexity of the case, the Monster of Florence has become part of popular culture, including in books, films, television series, and songs. The first book about the Monster case was Il mostro di Firenze, a 1983 non-fiction book by Mario Spezi. In 2006, Spezi wrote Dolci colline di sangue alongside Douglas Preston. Spezi and Preston cast doubts on the culpability of Pacciani as the Monster. In 2008, Spezi and Preston published The Monster of Florence: A True Story, which is the English translation of Dolci colline di sangue with some revisions and additions. Writer and producer Christopher McQuarrie purchased the screen rights to the book.

In 1986, Il mostro di Firenze, a film based on the case, was written and directed by Cesare Ferrario and co-written by Fulvio Ricciardi. Also in 1986, The Killer is Still Among Us, an Italian giallo loosely based on the case, was filmed soon after one of the murders. It was written and directed by Camillo Teti, and co-written by Giuliano Carnimeo and Ernesto Gastaldi. In 1991, Paolo Frajoli and Gianni Siragusa's wrote 28° minuto, a drama starring Corinne Cléry and Christian Borromeo inspired by the case. In 1996, Magdalen Nabb wrote The Monster of Florence, a fictionalised novel of the case that doubted Pacciani as the Monster. Although the book is a work of fiction, Nabb states that the investigation in the novel was real and the presentation as fiction was a protective measure, and it was based on extensive case documents, including the criminal profile report commissioned from the Behavioral Science Unit in Quantico, Virginia.

The 1999 novel Hannibal, the 2001 film adaptation, and the 2013 television adaption have all used the Monster case as the basis for a subplot of the scenes set in Florence. Thomas Harris visited Florence and attended Pacciani's trial while researching the book. In the novel, supporting antagonist Inspector Rinaldo Pazzi, based on Ruggero Perugini, was professionally disgraced when he arrested the wrong man for the murders. In scenes that were cut from the film before its release, a janitor at the Palazzo Vecchio who witnesses Hannibal Lecter (Anthony Hopkins) murdering Chief Inspector Rinaldo Pazzi (Giancarlo Giannini) before fleeing the city, is revealed to be the Monster. Although the subplot involving the Monster was removed entirely from the completed film, the deleted scenes are included as an extra feature on the DVD. In the third season of the television series, it is implied that Hannibal Lecter himself (Mads Mikkelsen) was the Monster.

In 2009, the six-part television film Il mostro di Firenze was produced and broadcast by Fox Crime. The True Stories of the Monster of Florence, a book published in April 2011 by Jacopo Pezzan and Giacomo Brunoro, gives a detailed account of all the murders and the different investigative theories. In 2012, Delitto degli Scopeti. Giustizia mancata, a book written by lawyers Vieri Adriani, Francesco Cappeletti, and Salvatore Maugeri, reanalyses and reconstructs the final pair of murders, which took place in the town of Scopeti, of French tourists Kraviechvili and Mauriot. The book claims to expose missteps and procedural errors in the investigation. In the 2017 episode "Il Mostro", the second episode of season 2 of the television series Criminal Minds: Beyond Borders, the Monster is identified as a surgeon (played by Paul Sorvino) and is thus also known as "The Surgeon of Death". Suspected of being the Monster after the murders, he left Florence and continued to kill elsewhere in Europe and Asia. Now terminally ill, he returns to Florence and manipulates his son (played by Luca Malacrino), the product of an incestuous rape between the Monster and his own sister, into becoming a copycat killer. The Monster of Florence, a miniseries based on the murders, created and produced by Stefano Sollima, began streaming on Netflix in October 2025.

== See also ==
- List of fugitives from justice who disappeared
- List of serial killers in Italy
