= Teed (surname) =

Teed is a surname. Notable persons with that name include:

- Cyrus Teed (1839–1908), an American physician and religious leader.
- Dick Teed (1926–2014), an American baseball player
- Douglas Arthur Teed (1860–1929), an American painter.
- Ellen Hollond, née Teed (1822–1884), an English writer and philanthropist.
- Eric Teed (1926–2010), a Canadian lawyer and politician.
- Freeman G. Teed (died 1916), Los Angeles city auditor.
- George Hamilton Teed
- Jill Teed, a Canadian actress
- John Teed (c.1770–before 1837), an English merchant and politician.
- Matthew Teed (1828–1904), an American politician.
- Nancy Teed (1949–1993), a Canadian politician.
- Nathaniel Teed
- Shirley Teed
