= Rufus King (lawyer) =

American politician (1817–1891)

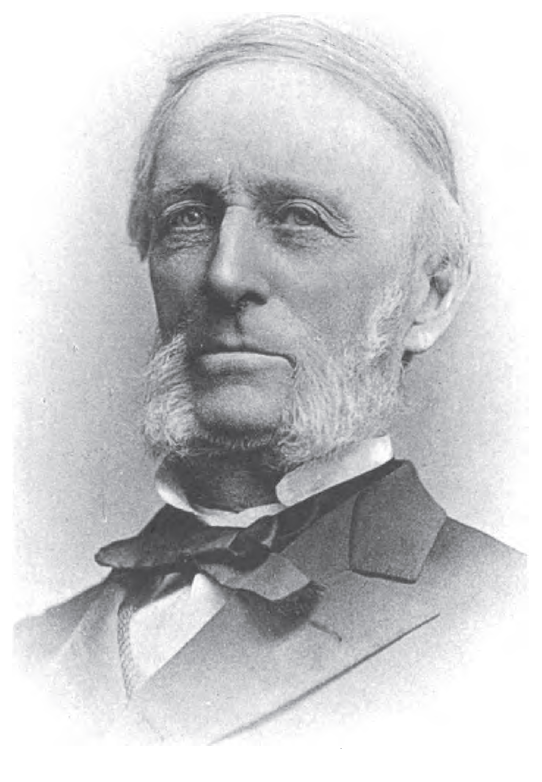

5th President of the University of Cincinnati
- In office 1860–1869
- Preceded by: Thomas J. Biggs
- Succeeded by: Robert Buchanan

Personal details
- Born: May 30, 1817 Chillicothe, Ohio, U.S.
- Died: March 25, 1891 (aged 73) Cincinnati, Ohio, U.S.
- Resting place: Spring Grove Cemetery
- Spouse: Margaret Rives
- Parent(s): Edward King; Sarah Ann Worthington
- Relatives: Rufus King (grandfather); Thomas Worthington (grandfather)
- Education: Kenyon College; Harvard University; Harvard Law School
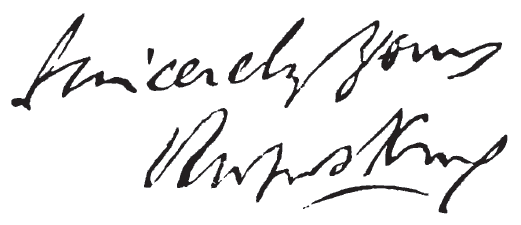
- Signature

Rufus King (May 30, 1817 – March 25, 1891) was an American lawyer and academic administrator, who served as the 5th president of the University of Cincinnati from 1860 until 1869 and as dean of the Cincinnati Law School. He also served as president of a convention that met to write a new constitution for the state of Ohio, and authored a history of the state of Ohio.

== Early life ==
Rufus King was born May 30, 1817, at Chillicothe, Ohio. His parents were Edward King and Sarah Ann (née Worthington) King. His grandfathers were U.S. Senator and the U.S. Ambassador to the United Kingdom Rufus King and U.S. Senator and Ohio Governor Thomas Worthington.

He entered Kenyon College, and transferred to Harvard University, where he graduated. He studied law under Joseph Story at Harvard Law School, and moved to Cincinnati, Ohio, in March, 1841, where he was admitted to the bar.

== Career ==
In 1851, Woodward High School and Hughes High School were consolidated, and King was elected president of the board of managers to the joint school in 1853, a position he held the rest of his life. He was also a member of the board of education of Cincinnati, (for primary schools), from 1851 to 1866, and was president of the board for eleven years.

In 1853, King urged the state commissioner of common schools that the public school libraries should be consolidated in cities. This led to the central library in Cincinnati. In 1867, King was elected to the board of directors of the library, and he was president of the board from 1870 to 1873.

In 1869, after King was no longer on the Cincinnati school board, the board passed a resolution banning "religious instruction and reading from religious books, including the Holy Bible." King was retained by those who opposed the resolution in court in the "Bible Case". The resolution was upheld. One commentator noted: "The first lawyers of the state took part in it. Men on the streets, in the marts of business, wherever intelligence met intelligence, waged the warfare without cessation. There were those who honestly thought that the pillars of the Commonwealth were being rudely shaken; that destruction was inevitable. But the schools survived."

=== War activities ===
During the American Civil War, King was entrusted by Governor William Dennison, Jr. to meet with citizens of Louisville from the neutral state of Kentucky, to assure them Ohio would not embargo shipping goods to that state. It turned out that that would not be the position of the citizens of Cincinnati, or of the federal government.

=== Government activities ===
In 1846, King was a member of conventions to form a citycharter. He was electeded a members of city council in 1848 and served one term. In 1872 he was elected to a constitutional convention to write a new constitution for Ohio. The convention met in Columbus starting in 1873, with Morrison Waite as the president of the convention. The meeting moved to Cincinnati in October, 1873. When Waite was made Chief Justice of the United States in early 1874, King became president of the convention. The Board of Tax Commissioners was created in 1883, and consisted of three men from the city. He serves as vice-president in past of the board until it was dissolved in 1891.

=== University activities ===
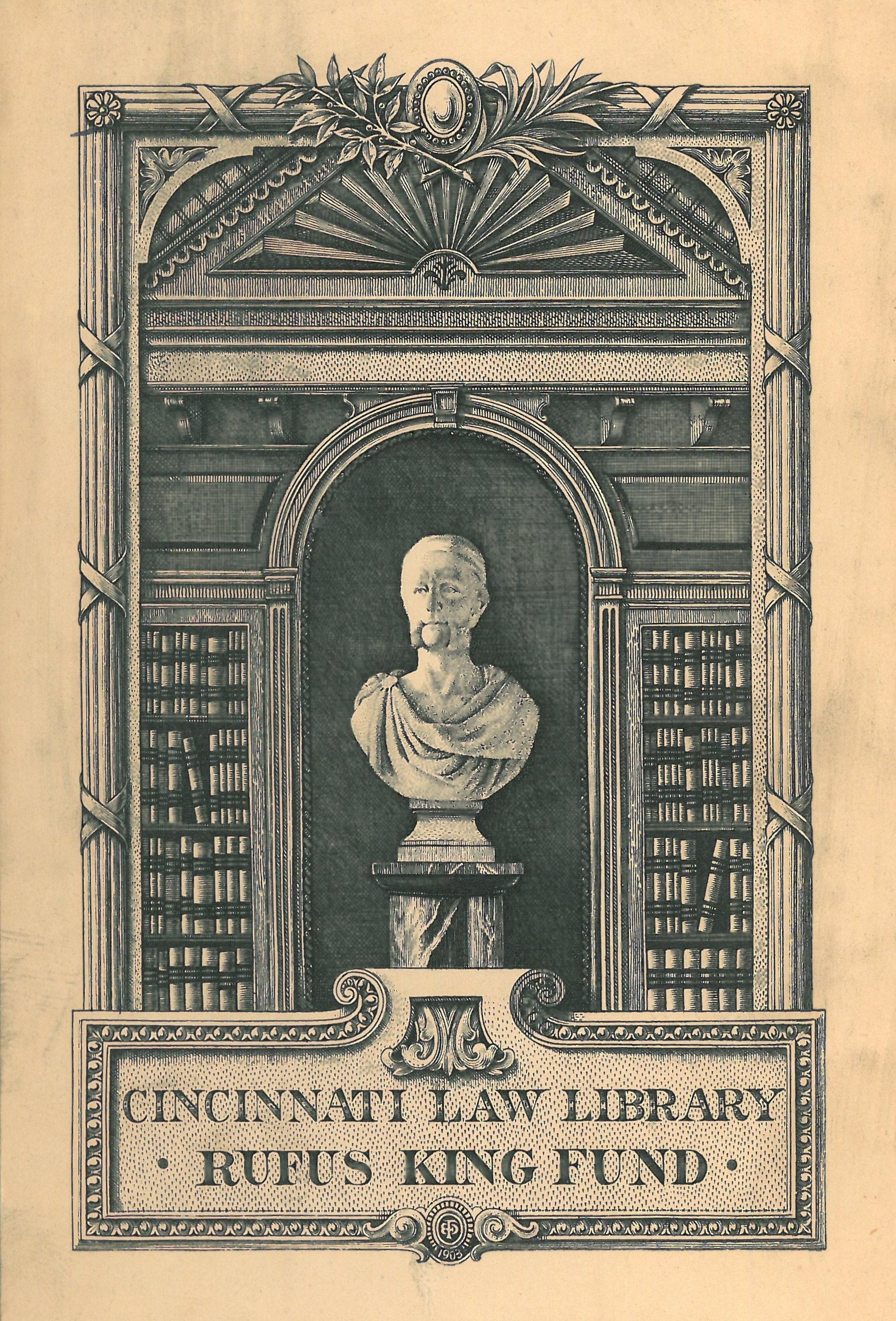
A bookplate designed in 1903 by Edwin Davis French for the Cincinnati Law Library featuring a bust of King

In 1859, King was elected by city council a director of McMicken University. On December 30 of that year, he was selected president of the board, and was re-elected each year until the name of the school was changed to the University of Cincinnati in 1870. He was then president of that board until 1877.

Rufus King's father was one of the founders of the Cincinnati Law School. Rufus King taught at the school, and was Dean of the Faculty from 1875 to 1880. He resigned the deanship, but continued to teach constitutional law and the law of real property until his death.

=== Legal activities ===
King was the second president of the Ohio State Bar Association from 1881 to 1882. He was president of the Cincinnati Bar Association for forty years. In 1864, Governor John Brough offered King a seat on the Ohio Supreme Court, which he declined. The Cincinnati Law Library Association was formed in 1847 by King, Alphonso Taft, Bellamy Storer, Salmon P. Chase and others. King was elected president of the board of directors in 1855, and held the office 36 years until his death.

His mind was wonderfully clear and his penetration deep; but he did not rely for success upon acumen or other natural gifts. He studied each case and presented it in court only after the exhaustive research which gave him the mastery of its principles and details. This habit, more than any other influence, made his reputation as a successful practitioner. And Rufus King was a great lawyer.

— George Reed et al.

King also served as a director of the Cincinnati Southern Railway and Cincinnati, Hamilton and Dayton Railroad companies. For a short time he acted as president of each.

=== Literary activities ===
In 1888, King authored Ohio, First Fruits of the Ordinance of 1787, one of a collection of state histories in Horace Scudder's American Commonwealths series. His widow wrote: "Among other things, it was his wish to enlarge his history of Ohio, which he had written under the disadvantage of being compelled to abridge the volume to a uniform size of a series for which he had undertaken to write. ... Mr. King's great desire, however, was to prepare a much-needed law book on a subject which for years had been a study of deep thought and research."

== Personal life ==
On May 18, 1843, King married Margaret Rives, daughter of Dr. Landon C. Rives, of Cincinnati, and niece of William Cabell Rives. Margaret's sister Anna married into Cincinnati's Longworth family. Rufus and Margaret King had no children.

He was a member of the Episcopal Church, and attended St. Paul Cathedral, where he was a vestryman for 36 years. He was a friend and legal advisor for Bishops Charles Pettit McIlvaine and Gregory T. Bedell, and a trustee of Kenyon College.

King died at Cincinnati on March 25, 1891. His funeral was held at St. Paul Cathedral. He was buried at Spring Grove Cemetery, where he had been elected a director in 1878, serving until his death. Among the pall-bearers were Judson Harmon, Manning Force, William S. Groesbeck, Jacob Dolson Cox and George Hoadly.

== Publications ==
- King, Rufus (1888). Ohio, First Fruits of the Ordinance of 1787. Houghton, Mifflin and Company. p. 10.

== Notes ==
Legal offices
Preceded by Rufus P. Ranney	President of the Ohio State Bar Association; July, 1881 - December, 1882	Succeeded by Richard A. Harrison
Preceded by James Bryant Walker	Dean of Cincinnati Law School; 1875 - 1880	Succeeded by Jacob Dolson Cox
