= Peter Bender =

German writer & religious leader (1893–1944)

- Born: 30 May 1893 Bechtheim, German Empire
- Died: 4 February 1944 (aged 50) Mauthausen concentration camp, Nazi Germany
- Occupation: Author

Peter Bender (30 May 1893 – 4 February 1944) was a German writer, religious leader, and Hollow Earth theory advocate. He died in the Holocaust.

== Biography ==
Bender was born in Rhineland-Palatinate in 1893. After graduating from high school and entering university to study philosophy, he volunteered for army service during World War I, serving as a pilot on the Eastern Front. He suffered a severe jaw injury in a plane crash. In the hospital, he met his future wife Charlotte Asch, whom he married in 1917; she came from a Jewish family of pharmacists. The couple settled in Worms and had two children, Gerhard and Maria.

Bender was involved in the socialist movement in Worms, co-founding and serving as a chairman in the local workers' council. While Bender worked as a writer and lecturer, his wife supported the family through income from language lessons. In 1919 Bender founded a religious community under the name “Wormser Menschgemeinde”. He was imprisoned in 1921 for blasphemy and spreading lewd writings. In 1927, he published his only novel, Karl Tormann – A Rhenish Man of Our Time (German: Karl Tormann – Ein rheinischer Mensch unserer Zeit).

Among Bender's topics of interest was the Hollow Earth theory. He saw himself as a successor to the American religious leader and Hollow Earth proponent Cyrus Teed, basing his ideas off his teachings and frequently contacting Teed's Florida community.

After the Nazi rise to power, Charlotte Bender, as a Jew, faced increasing restrictions on her daily life. Due to financial difficulties, the Benders moved to Frankfurt in 1935. In 1943, during World War II, Peter Bender was arrested by the Gestapo for allegedly criticizing the Nazi regime. He was deported to the Mauthausen concentration camp, where he died on 4 February 1944. Charlotte died in the Auschwitz concentration camp in March 1943, while both Bender children survived the war.

== Aftermath ==
In 2023, Austrian writer Clemens J. Setz published Monde vor der Landing, a novel about Bender.
