= John Symmes =

John Symmes may refer to:

- John Cleves Symmes (1742–1814), delegate to the Continental Congress
- John Cleves Symmes Jr. (1779–1829), nephew of the preceding, captain in the United States Army, promoter of a hollow earth theory
- John C. Symmes (pilot), American World War II fighter ace
