= Richard A. Harrison =

American politician

Richard Almgill Harrison
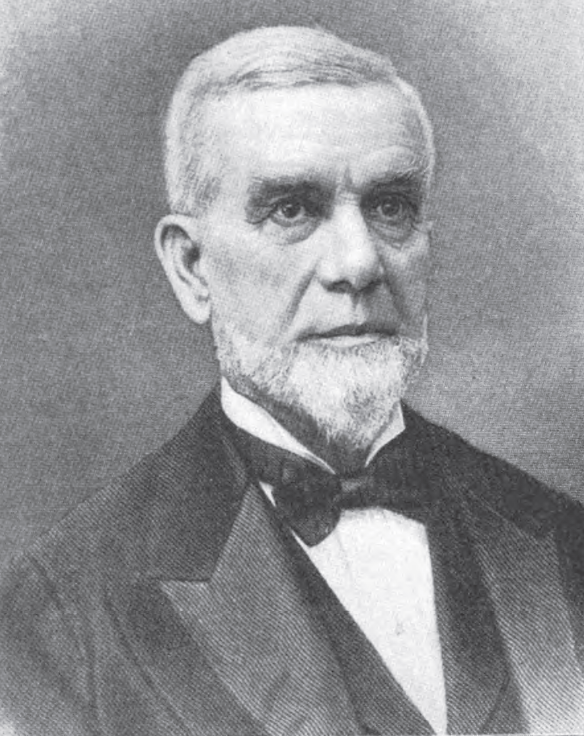

Member of the U.S. House of Representatives from Ohio's 7th district
- In office July 4, 1861 – March 3, 1863
- Preceded by: Thomas Corwin
- Succeeded by: Samuel S. Cox

Member of the Ohio House of Representatives from the Madison County district
- In office January 4, 1858 – January 1, 1860
- Preceded by: E. E. Hutchison
- Succeeded by: Robert Hutcheson

Member of the Ohio Senate from the 11th district
- In office January 2, 1860 – July 3, 1861
- Preceded by: Samuel S. Henkle
- Succeeded by: Samson Mason

Personal details
- Born: April 8, 1824 Thirsk, North Yorkshire, England, U.K.
- Died: July 30, 1904 (aged 80) Columbus, Ohio, U.S.
- Resting place: Kirkwood Cemetery, London, Ohio
- Party: Whig (before 1857); Republican (1857–61); Union (1861–64); Democratic (after 1870)
- Spouse: Maria Louisa Warner
- Education: Cincinnati Law School
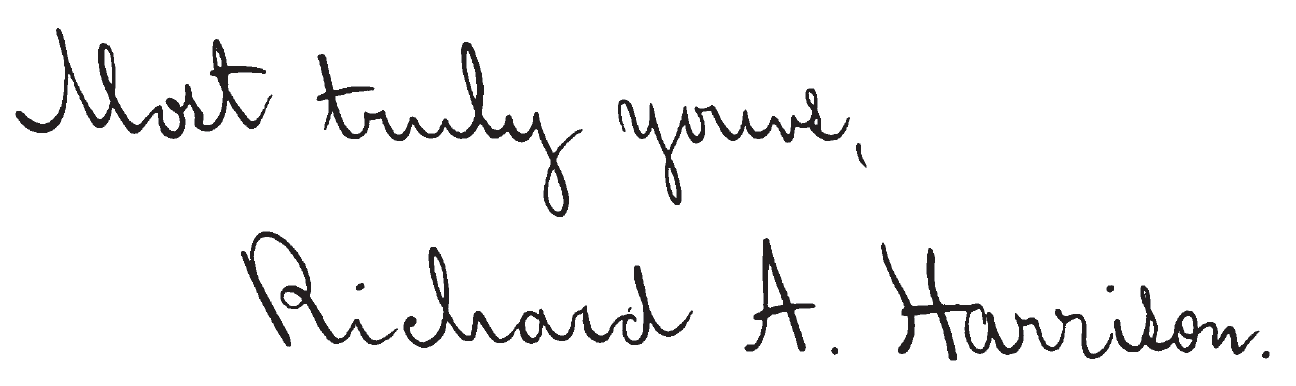
- Signature

Richard Almgill Harrison (April 8, 1824 – July 30, 1904) was an American politician and jurist from Ohio. He was elected to succeed Thomas Corwin in the United States House of Representatives, serving from 1861 to 1863. He was several times considered for a seat on the Supreme Court of Ohio, but declined the honor.

Harrison was born in Thirsk, England on April 8, 1824 to Robert and Mary (Almgill) Harrison. His father was a Methodist minister and mechanic. In 1832, the family immigrated to the United States, settling first in Waynesville, Ohio and later in Springfield. Harrison attended Ohio public schools and graduated from Springfield High School. While a student, he worked as a printer's devil in the office of the Springfield Republic, an influential Whig paper. Following graduation, he studied law successively under William A. Rodgers and William White before entering the Cincinnati Law School. Upon completion of the six-month course of study, he was admitted to the Ohio Bar on April 8, 1846. In 1847, he married Maria Louisa Warner, daughter of Henry Warner, with whom he had seven children.

Harrison practiced law at London, Ohio from 1846 to 1873, and afterwards at Columbus. At first a Whig, he joined the nascent Republican Party and was elected to the Ohio House of Representatives from Madison County in 1857 by a majority of 24 votes. In 1859, he was elected to the Ohio Senate. His senatorial term coincided with the 1860 United States presidential election and the ensuing secession crisis that preceded the American Civil War. During the January 1861 session of the legislature, Harrison introduced resolutions in support of the Union. In line with the conservative position staked by President James Buchanan, he denounced secession as "revolutionary," disclaimed any intent to interfere with slavery in the states, and called for the repeal of "enactments ... conflicting with, or rendering less efficient, the Constitution or laws of the United States." He was one of the party that received Abraham Lincoln at Columbus during the latter's journey to Washington in February 1861. He supported the Peace Conference of 1861 that sought unsuccessfully to negotiate a compromise to avert civil war.

Following the appointment of Thomas Corwin as U.S. minister to Mexico, Harrison was nominated for Corwin's vacant seat in the U.S. House of Representatives by the Union Party, a coalition of War Democrats and conservative Republicans. He narrowly defeated Aaron Harlan, the candidate of the Radical Republicans, and served the remainder of Corwin's term. He attended the special session of Congress that convened July 4, 1861. He was not a candidate for re-election in 1862, and was succeeded by Democrat Samuel S. Cox. In October 1864, he denied rumors that he would vote for the Democratic nominee for president, General George B. McClellan, and declared his support for Lincoln's re-election.

After the war, Harrison was several times considered for a seat on the Ohio Supreme Court. He was a Democratic candidate for that office in 1870, but was defeated along with the rest of the Democratic state ticket. He was offered an appointment to the bench by Governor Joseph B. Foraker in 1887, but declined. In 1893, Harrison was again considered for a judicial appointment, this time to the United States Supreme Court; on this occasion, he was passed over due to his advanced age.

In his later career, Harrison won great acclaim for his work as a corporate attorney specializing in railways. His work in the Boesel Railroad Cases (1872) established his national reputation as an authority on constitutional issues. He praised President Theodore Roosevelt and Attorney General Philander C. Knox in connection with the Northern Securities case, and predicted the court would find in favor of the administration. he died in Columbus Ohio in 1904 at 80

U.S. House of Representatives
Preceded by Thomas Corwin	Member of the U.S. House of Representatives from Ohio's 7th congressional district 1861-1863	Succeeded by Samuel S. Cox
Legal offices
Preceded by Rufus King	President of the Ohio State Bar Association; December 1882 - December 1883	Succeeded by Durbin Ward
