= Hollow Earth =

Disproven hypothesis

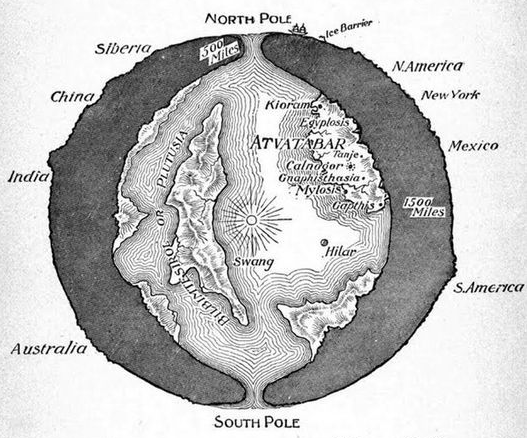
A cross-sectional drawing of the planet Earth showing the "Interior World" of Atvatabar, from William R. Bradshaw's 1892 science-fiction novel, The Goddess of Atvatabar

The Hollow Earth is a concept proposing that the planet Earth is entirely hollow or contains a substantial interior space. Notably suggested in the late 17th century by Edmond Halley, the notion was later disproven, first tentatively by Pierre Bouguer in 1740, then definitively by Charles Hutton in his Schiehallion experiment around 1774.

It was still defended through the mid-19th century, notably by John Cleves Symmes Jr. and J. N. Reynolds, but by this time it was part of popular pseudoscience and no longer a scientifically viable hypothesis.

The concept of a hollow Earth still recurs in folklore and as a premise for subterranean fiction, a subgenre of adventure fiction. Hollow Earth also recurs in conspiracy theories and the cryptoterrestrial hypothesis and is often said to be inhabited by mythological figures or political leaders.

== History ==
=== Ancient times ===
In ancient times, the concept of a subterranean land inside the Earth appeared in mythology, folklore and legends. The idea of subterranean realms seemed arguable, and became intertwined with the concept of "places" of origin or afterlife, such as the Greek underworld, the Nordic Svartálfaheimr, the Christian Hell, and the Jewish Sheol (with details describing inner Earth in Kabalistic literature, such as the Zohar and Hesed L'Avraham). The idea of a subterranean realm is also mentioned in Tibetan Buddhist belief. According to one story attributed to Tibetan Buddhist tradition, there is an ancient city called Shamballa which is located inside the Earth.

According to the Ancient Greeks, caverns under the surface led to the underworld. Such were the caverns at Tainaron in Lakonia, at Troezen in Argolis, at Ephya in Thesprotia, at Herakleia in Pontos, and in Ermioni. In Thracian and Dacian legends, it is said that there are caverns occupied by an ancient god called Zalmoxis. In Mesopotamian religion there is a story of a man who, after traveling through the darkness of a tunnel in the mountain of "Mashu", entered a subterranean garden.

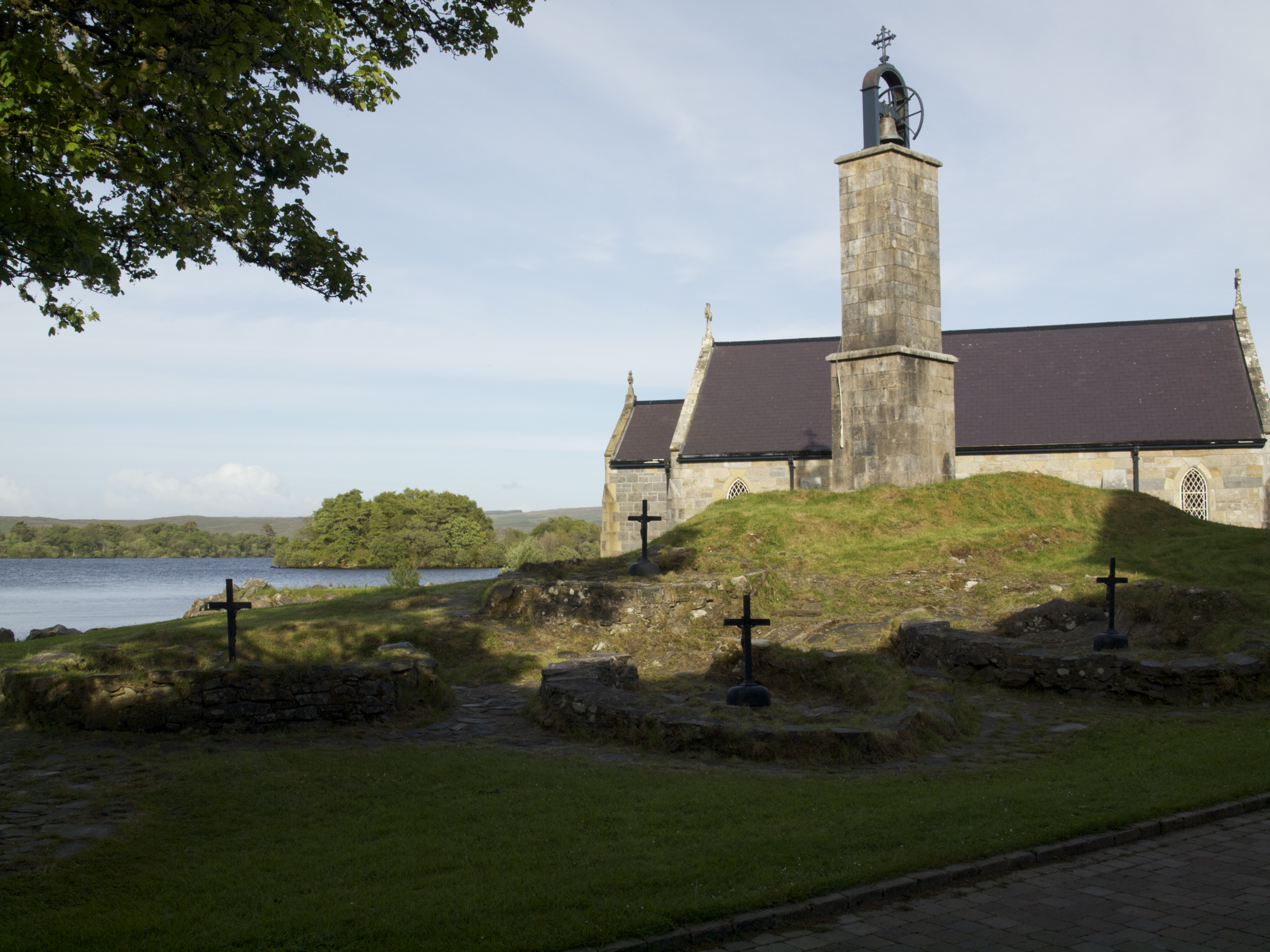
Chapel, bell tower and penitential beds on Station Island. The bell tower stands on a mound that is the site of a cave which, according to various myths, is an entrance to a place of purgatory inside the Earth. The cave has been closed since October 25, 1632.

In Celtic mythology there is a legend of a cave called "Cruachan", also known as "Ireland's gate to Hell", a mythical and ancient cave from which strange creatures would emerge and be seen on the surface of the Earth. There are also stories of medieval knights and saints who went on pilgrimages to a cave located in Station Island, County Donegal in Ireland, where they made journeys inside the Earth into a place of purgatory. In County Down, Northern Ireland there is a myth which says tunnels lead to the land of the subterranean Tuatha Dé Danann, a group of people who are believed to have introduced Druidism to Ireland, and then went back underground.

In Hindu mythology, the underworld is referred to as Patala. In the Bengali version of the Hindu epic Ramayana, it has been depicted how Rama and Lakshmana were taken by the king of the underworld Ahiravan, brother of the demon king Ravana. Later on they were rescued by Hanuman. The Angami Naga tribes of India claim that their ancestors emerged in ancient times from a subterranean land inside the Earth. The Taino from Cuba believe their ancestors emerged in ancient times from two caves in a mountain underground.

Natives of the Trobriand Islands believe that their ancestors had come from a subterranean land through a cavern hole called "Obukula". Mexican folklore also tells of a cave in a mountain five miles south of Ojinaga, and that Mexico is possessed by devilish creatures who came from inside the Earth.

In the Middle Ages, an ancient German myth held that some mountains located between Eisenach and Gotha hold a portal to the inner Earth. A Russian legend says the Samoyeds, an ancient Siberian tribe, traveled to a cavern city to live inside the Earth. The Italian writer Dante describes a hollow earth in his well-known 14th-century work Inferno, in which the fall of Lucifer from heaven caused an enormous funnel to appear in previously solid and spherical earth, as well as an enormous mountain opposite it, "Purgatory".

In Native American mythology, it is said that the ancestors of the Mandan people in ancient times emerged from a subterranean land through a cave on the north side of the Missouri River. There is also a tale about a tunnel in the San Carlos Apache Indian Reservation in Arizona near Cedar Creek which is said to lead inside the Earth to a land inhabited by a mysterious tribe. It is also the belief of the tribes of the Iroquois that their ancient ancestors emerged from a subterranean world inside the Earth. The elders of the Hopi people believe that a Sipapu entrance in the Grand Canyon exists which leads to the underworld.

Brazilian Indians, who live alongside the Parima River in Brazil, claim that their forefathers emerged in ancient times from an underground land, and that many of their ancestors still remained inside the Earth. Ancestors of the Inca supposedly came from caves which are located east of Cuzco, Peru.

=== 16th to 18th centuries ===
Diagram of Edmond Halley's hypothesis

The notion was proposed by Athanasius Kircher's non-fiction Mundus Subterraneus (1665), which speculated that there is an "intricate system of cavities and a channel of water connecting the poles".

Edmond Halley in 1692 started with Newton's (erroneous) estimate that the density of the Moon was almost double (9/5) the density of Earth. Rather than assume a dense Moon, Halley conjectured that the Earth might consist of a hollow shell about 800 km (500 mi) thick, two inner concentric shells and an innermost core. Atmospheres separate these shells, and each shell has its own magnetic poles. The spheres rotate at different speeds. Halley proposed this scheme in order to explain anomalous compass readings. He envisaged the atmosphere inside as luminous (and possibly inhabited) and speculated that escaping gas caused the Aurora Borealis.

Le Clerc Milfort in 1781 led a journey with hundreds of Muscogee Peoples to a series of caverns near the Red River above its junction with the Mississippi River. According to Milfort, the Muscogee Peoples believe their ancestors came out of the caverns under the surface of the Earth in ancient times. Milfort also claimed the caverns he saw "could easily contain 15,000 – 20,000 families".

It is claimed that mathematician Leonhard Euler proposed a single-shell hollow Earth with a small sun (1,000 kilometres across) at the center, providing light and warmth for an inner-Earth civilization, but that is not true. Instead, he did a thought experiment of an object dropped into a hole drilled through the center, unrelated to a hollow Earth.

=== 19th century ===
In 1818, John Cleves Symmes, Jr. suggested that the Earth consisted of a hollow shell about 1,300 km (810 mi) thick, with openings about 2,300 km (1,400 mi) across at both poles with 4 inner shells each open at the poles. Symmes became the most famous of the early Hollow Earth proponents, and Hamilton, Ohio even has a monument to him and his ideas. He proposed making an expedition to the North Pole hole, thanks to efforts of one of his followers, James McBride.

J. N. Reynolds also delivered lectures on the "Hollow Earth" and argued for an expedition. Reynolds went on an expedition to Antarctica himself but missed joining the Great U.S. Exploring Expedition of 1838–1842, even though that venture was a result of his agitation.

Though Symmes himself never wrote a book on the subject, several authors published works discussing his ideas. McBride wrote Symmes' Theory of Concentric Spheres in 1826. It appears that Reynolds has an article that appeared as a separate booklet in 1827: Remarks of Symmes' Theory Which Appeared in the American Quarterly Review. In 1868, professor W.F. Lyons published The Hollow Globe which put forth a Symmes-like Hollow Earth hypothesis, but failed to mention Symmes himself. Symmes's son Americus then published The Symmes' Theory of Concentric Spheres in 1878 to set the record straight.

Sir John Leslie proposed a hollow Earth in his 1829 Elements of Natural Philosophy (pp. 449–453).

William Fairfield Warren, in his book Paradise Found – The Cradle of the Human Race at the North Pole (1885), presented his belief that humanity originated on a continent in the Arctic called Hyperborea. This influenced some early Hollow Earth proponents. According to Marshall Gardner, both the Eskimo and Mongolian peoples had come from the interior of the Earth through an entrance at the North Pole.

=== 20th century ===
NEQUA or The Problem of the Ages, first published in serialization in a Topeka, Kansas newspaper in 1900, is considered an early feminist utopian novel. It mentions John Cleves Symmes' theory to explain its setting in a hollow Earth.

An early 20th-century proponent of hollow Earth, William Reed, wrote Phantom of the Poles in 1906. He supported the idea of a hollow Earth, but without interior shells or the inner sun.

The spiritualist writer Walburga, Lady Paget in her book Colloquies with an unseen friend (1907) was an early writer to mention the hollow Earth hypothesis. She claimed that cities exist beneath a desert, which is where the people of Atlantis moved. She said an entrance to the subterranean kingdom will be discovered in the 21st century.

Marshall Gardner wrote A Journey to the Earth's Interior in 1913 and published an expanded edition in 1920. He placed an interior sun in the Earth and built a working model of the Hollow Earth which he patented (U.S. patent 1,096,102). Gardner made no mention of Reed, but did criticize Symmes for his ideas. Around the same time, Vladimir Obruchev wrote a novel titled Plutonia, in which the Hollow Earth possessed an inner Sun and was inhabited by prehistoric species. The interior was connected with the surface by an opening in the Arctic.

The explorer Ferdynand Ossendowski discussed a Hollow Earth in his 1922 book titled Beasts, Men and Gods. Ossendowski said he was told about a subterranean kingdom located inside the Earth. Buddhists knew it as Agharti.

George Papashvily in his Anything Can Happen (1940) claimed when he was in the Caucasus Mountains, he discovered a cavern containing human skeletons "with heads as big as bushel baskets" and an ancient tunnel leading to the center of the Earth. One man entered the tunnel and never returned.

Novelist Lobsang Rampa in his book The Cave of the Ancients said an underground chamber system exists beneath the Himalayas of Tibet, filled with ancient machinery, records and treasure. Michael Grumley, a cryptozoologist, has linked Bigfoot and other hominid cryptids to ancient tunnel systems underground.

According to the ancient astronaut writer Peter Kolosimo a robot was seen entering a tunnel below a monastery in Mongolia. Kolosimo also claimed a light was seen from underground in Azerbaijan. Kolosimo and other ancient astronaut writers such as Robert Charroux linked these activities to UFOs.

The 1964 book The Hollow Earth by "Dr. Raymond Bernard" presents the idea of UFOs coming from inside the Earth, states the Ring Nebula proves the existence of hollow worlds, and speculates on the fate of Atlantis and the origin of flying saucers. An article by Martin Gardner revealed that Walter Siegmeister used the pseudonym "Bernard", but not until the 1989 publishing of Walter Kafton-Minkel's Subterranean Worlds: 100,000 Years of Dragons, Dwarfs, the Dead, Lost Races & UFOs from Inside the Earth did the connection between Bernard and Siegmeister become known to the public.

The science fiction pulp magazine Amazing Stories promoted one such idea from 1945 to 1949 as "The Shaver Mystery". The magazine's editor, Ray Palmer, ran a series of stories by Richard Sharpe Shaver, claiming that a superior prehistoric race had built a honeycomb of caves in the Earth, and that their degenerate descendants, known as "Dero", live there still, using the fantastic machines abandoned by the ancient races to torment those of us living on the surface. As one characteristic of this torment, Shaver described "voices" that purportedly came from no explainable source. Thousands of readers wrote to affirm that they, too, had heard the fiendish voices from inside the Earth. Lost Continents and the Hollow Earth (1998) by David Hatcher Childress reprinted Palmer's stories and defended the Hollow Earth idea based on alleged tunnel systems beneath South America and Central Asia.

Hollow Earth proponents have claimed a number of different locations for the entrances that lead inside the Earth. Other than the North and South poles, entrances in locations which have been cited include: Paris in France, Staffordshire in England, Montreal in Canada, Hangzhou in China, and the Amazon rainforest.

=== Variations ===
In A Culture of Conspiracy, political scientist Michael Barkun draws a distinction between the terms hollow earth and inner earth, to differentiate materials that conceive the majority of the interior of the planet to be hollow, from those that view it as solid but honeycombed with interconnected spaces.

==== Concave Hollow Earths ====
An example of a concave hollow Earth. Humans live on the interior, with the universe in the center.

Instead of saying that humans live on the exterior surface of a hollow planet, sometimes called a "convex" Hollow Earth hypothesis, it is hypothesized humans live on the interior surface. This has been called the "concave" Hollow Earth hypothesis or skycentrism.

Cyrus Teed, a doctor from upstate New York, proposed such a concave Hollow Earth in 1869, calling his scheme "Cellular Cosmogony". Teed founded a group called the Koreshan Unity based on this notion, which he called Koreshanity. The main colony survives as a preserved Florida state historic site, at Estero, Florida, but all of Teed's followers have now died. Teed's followers claimed to have experimentally verified the concavity of the Earth's curvature, through surveys of the Florida coastline making use of "rectilineator" equipment.

Several 20th-century German writers, including Peter Bender, Johannes Lang, Karl Neupert, and Fritz Braut, published works advocating the Hollow Earth hypothesis, or Hohlweltlehre. Some members of Adolf Hitler's naval staff were influenced by concave Hollow Earth ideas and sent an expedition in an unsuccessful attempt to spy on the British fleet by pointing infrared cameras up at the sky.

The Egyptian mathematician Mostafa Abdelkader wrote several scholarly papers working out a detailed mapping of the Concave Earth model. In his book On the Wild Side (1992), Martin Gardner discusses the Hollow Earth model articulated by Abdelkader. According to Gardner, this hypothesis posits that light rays travel in circular paths, and slow as they approach the center of the spherical star-filled cavern. No energy can reach the center of the cavern. A drill, Gardner says, would lengthen as it traveled away from the cavern and eventually pass through the "point at infinity" corresponding to the center of the Earth. Gardner notes that "most mathematicians believe that an inside-out universe, with properly adjusted physical laws, is empirically irrefutable". Gardner rejects the concave Hollow Earth hypothesis on the basis of Occam's razor.

Purportedly verifiable hypotheses of a Concave Hollow Earth need to be distinguished from a thought experiment which defines a coordinate transformation such that the interior of the Earth becomes "exterior" and the exterior becomes "interior". (For example, in spherical coordinates, let radius r go to R^{2}/r where R is the Earth's radius; see inversive geometry.) The transformation entails corresponding changes to the forms of physical laws. This is not a hypothesis but an illustration of the fact that any description of the physical world can be equivalently expressed in more than one way.

== Contrary evidence ==
=== Density of the Earth ===
In 1735, Pierre Bouguer and Charles Marie de La Condamine chartered an expedition from France to the Chimborazo volcano in Ecuador. Arriving and climbing the volcano in 1738, they conducted a vertical deflection experiment at two different altitudes to determine how local mass anomalies affected gravitational pull. In a paper written a little over ten years later, Bouguer commented that his results had at least falsified the Hollow Earth Theory. In 1772, Nevil Maskelyne proposed to repeat the same experiment to the Royal Society. Within the same year, the Committee of Attraction was formed and they sent Charles Mason to find the perfect candidate for the vertical deflection experiment. Mason found the Schiehallion mountain, where the experiment took place and not only supported the earlier Chimborazo Experiment but yielded far greater results.

In 1798, Henry Cavendish published a measurement of the density of the Earth based on a torsion balance. These results were later repurposed into a measurement of the gravitational constant.

Based upon the size of the Earth and the force of gravity on its surface, the average density of the planet Earth is 5.515 g/cm^{3}, and typical densities of surface rocks are only half that (about 2.75 g/cm^{3}). If any significant portion of the Earth were hollow, the average density would be much lower than that of surface rocks. The only way for Earth to have the force of gravity that it does is for much more dense material to make up a large part of the interior. Nickel-iron alloy under the conditions expected in a non-hollow Earth would have densities ranging from about 10 to 13 g/cm^{3}, which brings the average density of Earth to its observed value.

=== Seismic ===
The picture of the structure of the Earth that has been arrived at through the study of seismic waves is quite different from a fully hollow Earth. The time it takes for seismic waves to travel through and around the Earth directly contradicts a fully hollow sphere. The evidence indicates the Earth is mostly filled with solid rock (mantle and crust), liquid nickel-iron alloy (outer core), and solid nickel-iron (inner core).

=== Planetary creation ===
Another set of scientific arguments against a Hollow Earth or any hollow planet comes from gravity. Massive objects tend to clump together gravitationally, creating non-hollow spherical objects such as stars and planets. The solid spheroid is the best way to minimize the gravitational potential energy of a rotating physical object; having hollowness is unfavorable in the energetic sense. In addition, ordinary matter is not strong enough to support a hollow shape of planetary size against the force of gravity; a planet-sized hollow shell with the known, observed thickness of the Earth's crust would not be able to achieve hydrostatic equilibrium with its own mass and would collapse.

=== Direct observation ===
Drilling holes does not provide direct evidence against the hypothesis. The deepest hole drilled to date is the Kola Superdeep Borehole, with a true vertical drill-depth of around 12 km (7.5 mi). However, the distance to the center of the Earth is nearly 6,400 km (4,000 mi).

== In fiction ==
The idea of a hollow Earth is a common element of fiction, appearing as early as Ludvig Holberg's 1741 novel Nicolai Klimii iter subterraneum (Niels Klim's Underground Travels), in which Nicolai Klim falls through a cave while spelunking and spends several years living on both a smaller globe within and the inside of the outer shell.

Other notable early examples include Giacomo Casanova's 1788 Icosaméron, a 5-volume, 1,800-page story of a brother and sister who fall into the Earth and discover the subterranean utopia of the Mégamicres, a race of multicolored, hermaphroditic dwarves; Symzonia: A Voyage of Discovery by a "Captain Adam Seaborn" (1820) which reflected the ideas of John Cleves Symmes, Jr.; Edgar Allan Poe's 1838 novel The Narrative of Arthur Gordon Pym of Nantucket; Jules Verne's 1864 novel Journey to the Center of the Earth, which showed a subterranean world teeming with prehistoric life; George Sand's 1864 novel Laura, Voyage dans le Cristal where giant crystals could be found in the interior of the Earth; Sir Edward Bulwer-Lytton's novel Vril: The Power of the Coming Race, published anonymously in 1871; Etidorhpa, an 1895 science-fiction allegory with major subterranean themes; and The Smoky God, a 1908 novel that included the idea that the North Pole was the entrance to the hollow planet.

In William Henry Hudson's 1887 romance, A Crystal Age, the protagonist falls down a hill into a Utopian paradise; since he falls into this world, it is sometimes classified as a hollow Earth story. (The hero himself thinks he may have traveled forward in time by millennia).

The idea was used by Edgar Rice Burroughs in the seven-novel "Pellucidar" series, beginning with At the Earth's Core (1914). Using a mechanical drill, called the Iron Mole, his heroes David Innes and Professor Abner Perry discover a prehistoric world called Pellucidar, 500 miles below the surface, that is lit by a constant noonday inner sun. They find prehistoric people, dinosaurs, prehistoric mammals and the Mahar, who evolved from pterosaurs. The series ran for six more books, ending with Savage Pellucidar (1963). The 1915 novel Plutonia by Vladimir Obruchev uses the concept of the Hollow Earth to take the reader through various geological epochs.

In recent decades, the idea has become a staple of the science fiction and adventure genres across films (Children Who Chase Lost Voices, Ice Age: Dawn of the Dinosaurs, Aquaman and the MonsterVerse), television programs (Inside Job, Slugterra, and the third and fourth seasons of Sanctuary), role-playing games (e.g., the Hollow World Campaign Set for Dungeons & Dragons, Hollow Earth Expedition), and video games (Torin's Passage and Gears of War). The idea is also partially used in the Marvel Comics universe, where there exists a subterranean realm beneath the Earth known as Subterranea. The Super Nintendo Entertainment System (SNES) video game Terranigma features this concept in the opening and closing acts of the game.

The Hollow Earth is a key location in Legendary Pictures's MonsterVerse franchise, being the point of origin of the Titans and the strange animals of Skull Island. Initially being teased in Kong: Skull Island and Godzilla: King of the Monsters, a full expedition into the Hollow Earth is a primary focus of Godzilla vs. Kong, its sequel Godzilla x Kong: The New Empire, and the Monarch: Legacy of Monsters TV series.

Owen Egerton's book Hollow: A Novel uses the Hollow Earth concept and includes a trip to find an entrance to the Hollow Earth led by a con artist but the title also works as a recurring metaphor in a story of grief and despair.

== In popular art ==
In 1975, Japanese artist Tadanori Yokoo used elements of the Agartha legend, along with other Eastern subterranean myths, to depict an advanced civilization in the cover art for jazz musician Miles Davis's album Agharta. Tadanori said he was partly inspired by his reading of Raymond W. Bernard's 1969 book The Hollow Earth.

== See also ==
- Dyson sphere
- Earth's inner core
- Expanding Earth
- Flat Earth
- Hades
- Hollow Moon
- List of topics characterized as pseudoscience
- Myth of the flat Earth
- Scientific skepticism
- Shellworld
- Travel to the Earth's center
- Xibalba
- List of Hollow Earth proponents

== General and cited references ==
- Kafton-Minkel, Walter. Subterranean Worlds. Loompanics Unlimited, 1989.
- Lamprecht, Jan. Hollow Planets: A Feasibility Study of Possible Hollow Worlds Grave Distraction Publications, 2014.
- Lewis, David. The Incredible Cities of Inner Earth. Science Research Publishing House, 1979.
- Seaborn, Captain Adam. Symzonia; Voyage of Discovery. J. Seymour, 1820.
- Standish, David. Hollow Earth: The Long and Curious History of Imagining Strange Lands, Fantastical Creatures, Advanced Civilizations, and Marvelous Machines Below the Earth's Surface. Da Capo Press, 2006.
