= James McBride (pioneer) =

American politician

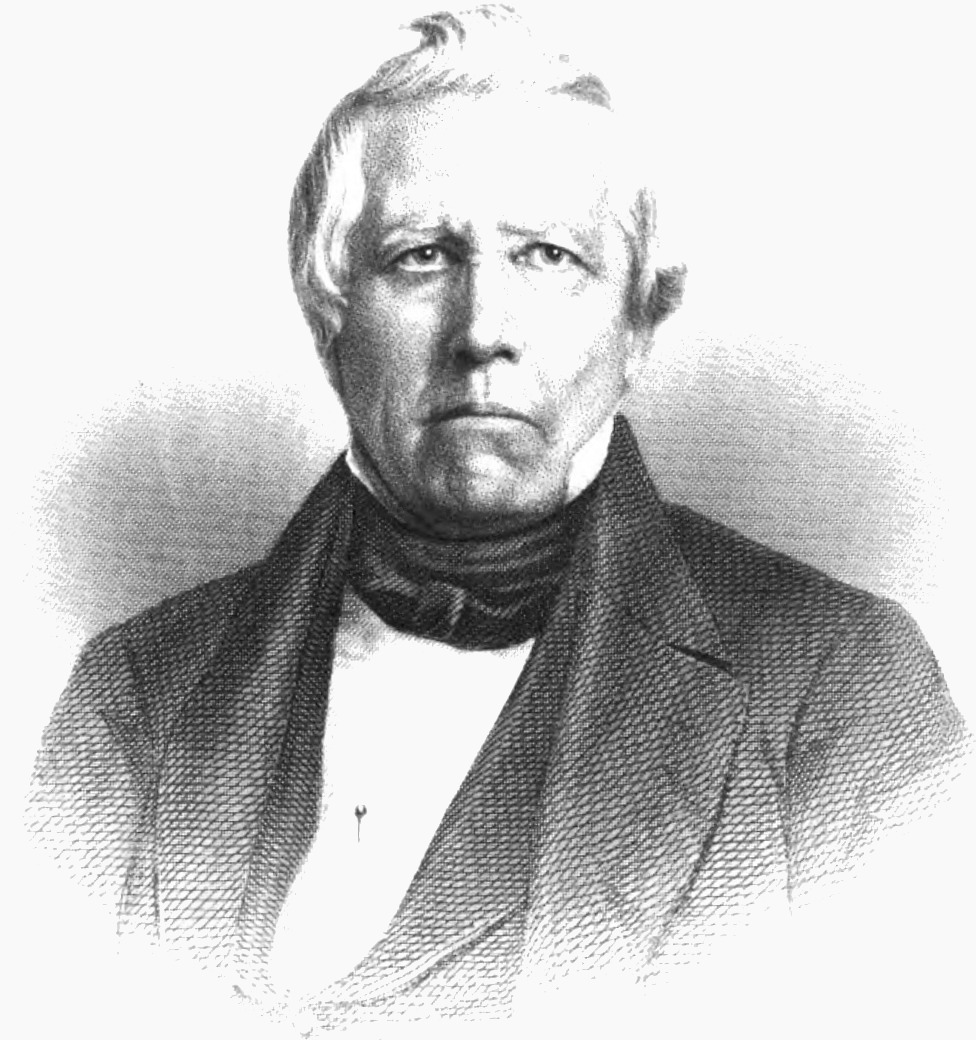

Member of the Ohio House of Representatives from the Butler County district
- In office December 2, 1822 – November 30, 1823 Serving with Joel Collins; James Shields
- Preceded by: Robert Anderson; Joel Collins; James Shields
- Succeeded by: James Clark; David Higgins; Marsh Williams

Personal details
- Born: November 2, 1788 Franklin County, Pennsylvania
- Died: October 3, 1859 (aged 70) Hamilton, Ohio
- Spouse: Hannah Lytle
- Children: four

James McBride (1788–1859) was a prominent pioneer statesman in Butler County, Ohio. He was Hamilton's first Mayor, and a prominent State Representative associated with the canals, archaeologist who supplied a considerable number of sketches of earthworks for early texts on the Mississippi Valley, Ohio's leading pioneer author and antiquarian, Miami University Secretary and President of the Board of Trustees, Butler County's fifth Sheriff, a surveyor, and an officer of other various entities. James McBride married the daughter of Judge Lytle, of the Lytle family of the Ohio River Valley, and was through her kinsman with Sen. Homer T. Bone, and Governor of Ohio Andrew L. Harris. McBride's son in law was Roger N. Stembel, a commander of the Pacific Fleet.

McBride became an ardent convert to John C. Symmes' Hollow Earth theory, and wrote a book in support of it in 1826.

== Archaeological work ==
As an archaeologist, he lived and worked near the Great Miami River, examining evidence of ancient life in the region. A canal engineer, J.W. Erwin, served as his assistant, making surveys of earthworks in the Great Miami River valley. McBride retained his own collection of artifacts. He was a surveyor for the Ohio Board of Public Works. Artifacts and research by McBride was used by Ephraim George Squier and Edwin Hamilton Davis in the Smithsonian Institution publication, Ancient Monuments of the Mississippi Valley.

== Legacy ==
McBride Hall is a dormitory on the Miami University campus named in McBride's memory.
