= Phantom of the Poles =

1906 book by William Reed

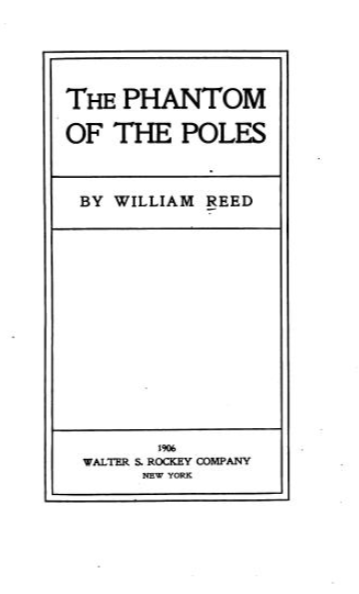
- Title page for The Phantom of the Poles (1906)
- Author: William Reed
- Language: English
- Genre: Science
- Publication date: 1906

The Phantom of the Poles is a book written by William Reed and published in 1906. It attempts to explain certain mysterious phenomena reported by polar explorers by postulating that the Earth is in fact hollow, with holes at its poles.

== Phenomena to be explained ==
In the General Summary chapter of The Phantom of the Poles, Reed posed several questions that he claimed were explained by the Hollow Earth theory:

1. Why is the earth flattened at the poles?
2. Why have the poles never been reached?
3. Why does the sun not appear for so long in winter near the supposed poles?
4. Assuming that the earth is hollow, the interior should be warmer.
5. We must now resort to the compass. Does it refuse to work when drawing near the supposed poles?
6. Meteors are constantly falling near the supposed poles. Why?
7. The next query is concerning the great quantities of dust constantly found in the Arctic Ocean. What causes this dust?
8. What produces the Aurora Borealis?
9. Icebergs are next in order. Where are they formed? And how??
10. What causes tidal waves?
11. What causes colored snow in the Arctic region?
12. Why are the nights so long in the polar regions?
13. What causes the great ice-pressure in the Arctic Ocean during still tide and calm weather?
14. Why is the ice filled with rock, gravel, and sand?

== Invalidation of the theory ==
Admiral Peary claimed to have reached the North Pole on April 6, 1909. This would have invalidated Reed's premise that the poles cannot be reached. Although Peary's claim was, in its day, and continues to be controversial, on December 14, 1911, Roald Amundsen undisputedly reached the South Pole. Subsequent expeditions to and flights over the South Pole have conclusively demonstrated that there are no large holes there.
