= David Higgins (Ohio politician) =

American politician (1789–1873)

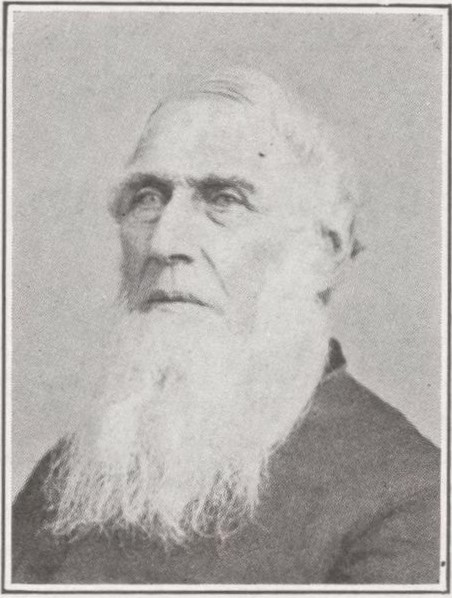

Speaker of the Ohio House of Representatives
- In office December 4, 1826 – December 2, 1827
- Preceded by: William W. Irvin
- Succeeded by: Edward King

Personal details
- Born: August 2, 1789 Lyme, Connecticut, U.S.
- Died: December 15, 1873 (aged 84) Washington, D.C., U.S.
- Resting place: Oak Hill Cemetery; Washington, D.C., U.S.
- Party: Democratic
- Spouses: Cecilia Davis; Letitia King
- Children: 3
- Education: Yale Law School

David Higgins (August 2, 1789 – December 15, 1873) was a politician and judge from the U.S. State of Ohio. He was the Speaker of the Ohio House of Representatives 1826 to 1827.

== Early life ==
David Higgins was born at Lyme, Connecticut, on August 2, 1789. His parents were Rev. David Higgins and Emma (Gelbert) Higgins. His father was pastor of the church at Lyme, and moved the family to Aranelius (now Auburn, New York) in 1801. Before 1812, David attended Yale Law School for two years, and moved to Cambridge, Maryland, to tutor for a private family. While in Maryland, he met and married Cecilia Davis of Harper's Ferry, Virginia.

== Professional ==
The young family moved to Angelica, New York, where Higgins practiced law, and by 1816 moved to Hamilton, Ohio, by horseback with an infant son. In 1818 or 1819 they moved to Springfield, Ohio, where their third child was born in 1820.

While in Springfield, Higgins was elected four years in a row to the Ohio House of Representatives, the last of which, (1826-'7), he served as the speaker of the house. In 1828, they moved again, this time to Norwalk in northern Ohio.

In Norwalk, Higgins practiced law privately, until he was elected by the legislature as President Judge of the Third Judicial Circuit of Ohio. After the election of President James K. Polk, Higgins was appointed to a clerkship with the Treasury Department in Washington, D.C., which he retained until his death in 1873.

== Personal ==
Higgins' first wife, Cecilia, died in Washington in October, 1846. He married Letitia King of Washington in 1848, and she survived him, along with two of his children.

While riding in his carriage in 1834 in Norwalk, Ohio, his horse ran away, and Higgins injured his foot in jumping to safety. His leg was amputated below the knee, and he used a prosthesis the rest of his life.

Higgins died on December 15, 1873. He is buried at Oak Hill Cemetery in Washington, D.C.

Ohio House of Representatives
Preceded by James McBride; Joel Collins; James Shields	Representative from Butler County; December 1, 1823-December 2, 1827; Served alongside: several others	Succeeded by James Shields; James Heaton; Daniel Woodmansee
