= Edward King (Ohio politician) =

American politician (1795–1836)

Member of the Ohio State Senate
- In office 1830–1831
- Preceded by: Duncan McArthur
- Succeeded by: Anthony Walke

Speaker of the Ohio House of Representatives
- In office December 3, 1827 – December 6, 1829
- Preceded by: David Higgins
- Succeeded by: Thomas L. Hamer

Member of the Ohio House of Representatives
- In office 1825–1829
- In office 1823–1824

Personal details
- Born: March 13, 1795 Albany, New York, US
- Died: February 6, 1836 (aged 40) Cincinnati, Ohio, US
- Resting place: Grandview Cemetery, Chillicothe, Ohio
- Party: National Republican
- Spouse: Sarah Ann Worthington (m. 1816)
- Children: Rufus King
- Parent(s): Rufus King; Mary Alsop King
- Relatives: John Alsop (grandfather); John Alsop King (brother); Charles King (brother); James Gore King (brother)
- Education: Columbia University; Litchfield Law School

Edward King (March 13, 1795 – February 6, 1836) was an American politician and lawyer. He was an Ohio legislator and twice Speaker of the Ohio House of Representatives, and was on the first faculty of the Cincinnati Law School.

== Early life ==
Edward King was born at Albany, New York on March 13, 1795. He was the fourth son of the Honorable Rufus King (1755–1827), who was then a Senator, and Mary (née Alsop) King. His maternal grandparents were John Alsop, a prominent merchant and Mary (née Frogat) Alsop. He had four brothers, including John Alsop King, the Governor of New York, Charles King, who was President of Columbia University, James Gore King, a U.S. Congressman, and Frederic Gore King.

His father became the U.S. Ambassador to Great Britain in 1796, and Edward spent his early youth in London. He returned to the United States and graduated from Columbia University and from law school in Litchfield, Connecticut.

== Career ==
In 1815, he moved to Chillicothe, Ohio, and was admitted to the bar in 1816.

He acquired a good practice, and personal popularity. He also held several elected offices while living in Chillicothe. He was Prosecuting Attorney of Ross County in 1819. In 1823–1824, he represented his county in the Ohio House of Representatives in the 22nd General Assembly. In 1825, he was again Prosecuting Attorney, and was again in the Ohio House December 1825 - 1829 for the 24th through 27th General Assemblies, serving as Speaker of the House in the 26th and 27th General Assemblies.

In 1830, for the 29th General Assembly, he represented his county in the Ohio Senate. During the 1830-1831 Assembly, he lost election for United States Senator to Thomas Ewing. He was affiliated with the National Republican Party.

In 1831, Edward King moved to Cincinnati, where he was instrumental in establishing Cincinnati Law School, the first law school in the West, in 1833. The first professors were King, Judge John C. Wright, and Judge Timothy Walker, who served as Dean.

== Personal life ==
In 1816, King married Sarah Ann Worthington (1800–1877), second daughter of Governor and U.S. Senator Thomas Worthington. Edward and Sarah King were parents of:

- Rufus King (1817–1891), a prominent Cincinnati lawyer who became Dean of the Cincinnati Law School and was the 5th President of the University of Cincinnati.
- Thomas King, who lived in Columbus, Ohio.

In 1834, King fell ill, moved to the South, in search of a gentler climate, and returned to Cincinnati where he died on February 6, 1836. He was buried at Grandview Cemetery (Chillicothe, Ohio).

After his death, King's widow, Sarah Ann, married William Peter, an English born diplomat who served as the Britannic Majesty's Consul at Philadelphia. Peter died in 1853 and Sarah Ann, widowed again, became a devout convert to the Roman Catholic faith. She traveled frequently to Europe, and became a friend of Pope Pius IX, attending the First Vatican Council. Sarah died in 1877 in Cincinnati.

== Notes ==
Ohio House of Representatives
Preceded by David Higgins	Speaker of the Ohio House of Representatives; 1827-29	Succeeded by Thomas L. Hamer
Ohio Senate
Preceded by Duncan McArthur	Senator from Ross County; 1830-1831	Succeeded by Anthony Walke
