= William Reed (author) =

American writer

- Born: 1830
- Died: 1920 (aged 89–90)
- Occupation: Author
- Writing career
- Subject: Hollow Earth theory
- Notable work: Phantom of the Poles (1906)

William Reed (1830–1920) was the author of Phantom of the Poles, published in 1906, in which he proposed his theory that the Earth is in fact hollow, with holes at its poles.

Reed summarizes his theory as follows: "The earth is hollow. The Poles, so long sought, are phantoms. There are openings at the northern and southern extremities. In the interior are vast continents, oceans, mountains and rivers. Vegetable and animal life are evident in this New World, and it is probably peopled by races unknown to dwellers on the Earth's surface."

Phantom of the Poles is considered one of the most influential of the Hollow Earth works.
