= Koreshan Unity =

American communal utopia

The Koreshan Unity was a communal utopia formed by Cyrus Teed. The Koreshans followed Teed's beliefs, called Koreshanity, and he was regarded by his adherents as "the new Messiah now in the World". After moving from New York to Illinois, the group eventually settled in Estero, Florida. Hedwig Michel died in 1982; she was the last person to be an official member of the Koreshans.

Flag of the Koreshan Unity

== Founding ==
The Koreshan Unity started in the 1870s in New York City, where Teed started preaching his beliefs. Teed took the name "Koresh", the Hebrew translation of his name Cyrus, meaning shepherd.

He formed short-lived groups in New York City and Moravia, New York. After finding it hard to find converts in New York, he moved to Chicago in 1886. Teed's followers formed a commune in Chicago in 1888 called Beth-Ophra. Koreshan affiliated "study groups" also appeared in Baltimore, Portland, San Francisco, Springfield and Lynn, Massachusetts, and elsewhere.

== Beliefs ==
The Koreshan Unity, led by Cyrus Teed, was a religious cult that followed the ideals of celibacy, community, and equality to attain immortality. Teed described God as a hybrid of male and female. Due to this belief, he and the cult as a whole were very open to feminism and the equality between the sexes. The ruling body of the Unity was the Planetary Court; it was composed exclusively of women, aside from Teed as the leader of the Court.

Koreshan celibacy, according to Teed, was the guiding principle humans should live by in order to attain immortality. Teed preached that women were slaves in their marriages and a way for them to be liberated was to move to the commune and practice celibacy, which was very appealing to some women at the time.

Teed denounced commercialism and wished for the Unity to eschew personal property. However, archaeological research has shown that some members did keep private keepsakes and an iron-key was discovered, showing that even if the Koreshans called for communal ownership, some places or things were off limits. The group was also known to sell excess goods to locals who lived outside the commune.

The Unity also believed in a concave hollow Earth. They thought the world was on the inside crust of the planet and the sky was the inside of the earth. Teed's evidence for these claims included a device he invented called the "Rectilineator", which could measure the supposed concavity of the Earth's surface.

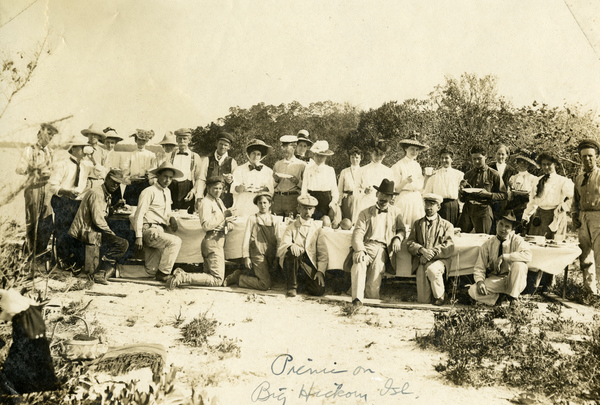
Koreshan Unity picnic on Big Hickory Island (12102820954)

=== Membership levels ===
There was a tri-level system of membership.

- The outer level was made up of non-believers who were willing to work for the Unity. This group was called the Patrons of Equation, and allowed for marriage and participation in the secular aspects of the unity.
- The middle group, the Department of Equitable Administration, allowed for marriage, but sexual relationships were only to be for the purpose of reproduction.
- The inner, core, group (called The Pre-Eminent Unity) was the Celibate and Communal group, which did not allow marriage and practiced celibacy.

Within each of these three levels were three distinct branches, the Secular System, the Commercial System, and the Educational System, with a total of nine groups.

== Community ==
Eventually, Teed took his followers to Estero, Florida, to form his "New Jerusalem" in 1894. The community was at its peak 1903–1908, when it had over 250 residents. There were apparently another 4,000 believers around the country. Teed claimed he had a vision in which he was to establish a utopian city of 10,000,000 with streets up to 400 feet (120 m) wide. Membership declined following his death in 1908.

The group built extensively, establishing a bakery, printing house (publishing their newspaper and other publications), the "World College of Life", a general store, concrete works, power plant (supplying power to the surrounding area years before it was available elsewhere in the region) and more. The colony was extensively landscaped. The Unity also owned a home on Estero Island, called La Parita. The house, on the bay side of the island, was where Teed died.

In 1961, the land was deeded to the State of Florida by the colony's last members. Koreshan State Park was established to document and preserve the grounds.

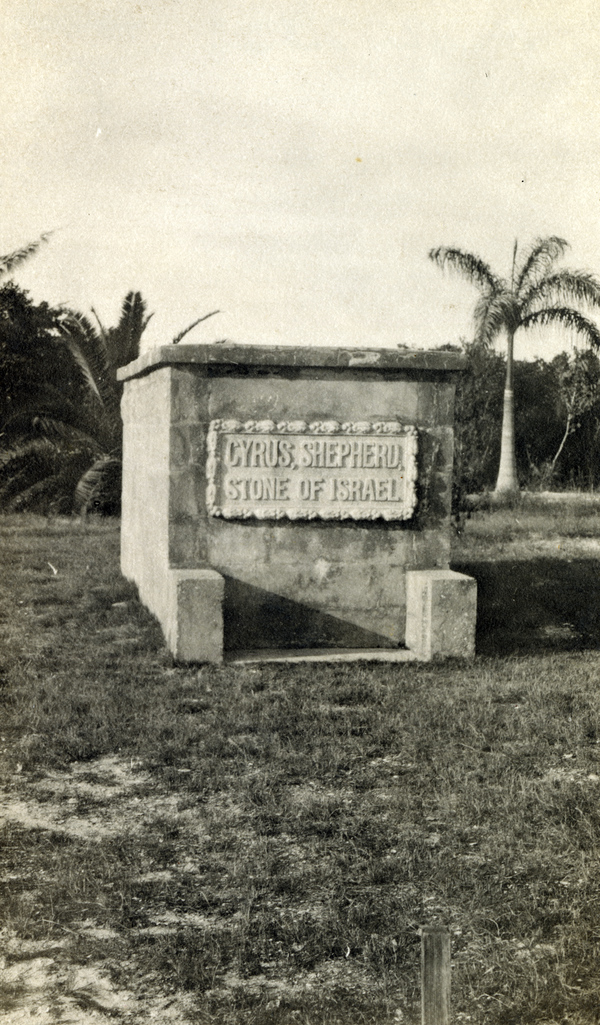
An early view Cyrus Teed's (Koresh) tomb on Estero Beach. The stone says: "Cyrus, Shepherd, Stone of Israel".

== Political party ==
In 1906, the community formed the Progressive Liberal Party to run several candidates for county government against the local Democratic Party but were never successful. This Progressive Liberal Party consisted of Koreshans, socialists, Republicans, and dissatisfied Democrats. The Koreshans had already incorporated Estero and were seeking further political power in Lee County. After Teed died in 1908 the group went into decline. Several groups split off from the Unity. One such group was the Order of Theocracy that left in 1910 and moved to nearby Ft. Myers. This group lasted until 1931. The fact the Unity was celibate did not help, although celibacy was not the real problem since there was a married status within the Unity. Celibates were the highest order. Without new members joining, the group slowly dwindled. It continued to publish the Flaming Sword until the printing press burned down in 1949. It also published the American Eagle, which began in 1906 and later became a horticultural newspaper.

=== Followers ===
The last remaining follower, Hedwig Michel, joined in 1940. She had learned of the Koreshans in Germany, and fled Nazi persecution. She ceded the main portion of the commune grounds to Florida to form a state park in 1961. The Koreshan State Historic Site (now known as the Koreshan State Park) was opened in 1967. Hedwig Michel continued to live in the building known as the "Planetary Court." She died in 1982. She is the only Koreshan buried within the park. Two other Koreshan cemeteries are nearby, one of which lies within a gated community and the other on land owned by the Audubon Society. Partly due to the Koreshan belief in a form of reincarnation, little, if anything, was done to care for these cemeteries. The only permanent grave stones were put in by family members.

== College ==
The College of Life Foundation, formerly the Koreshan Unity Foundation, is now the owner/caretaker of the remaining Koreshan land. The archival materials of the Foundation were distributed to the Florida Memory/State Archives. Many manuscripts and documents were packed and sent to Tallahassee around 2009.

Some archives and artifacts were also sent to Florida Gulf Coast University (FGCU) Archives. The Koreshan State Park (originally known as the Koreshan State Historic Site) also had a collection of archival materials which were also donated to FGCU. After Michel's death, control of the Koreshan Unity Foundation passed to her secretary, Jo Bigelow, and most recently another individual, Charles Dauray, who is also deceased. None of those controlling the College of Life Foundation are Koreshan believers.

== See also ==
- List of American utopian communities
