= Koreshanity =

Set of religious beliefs put forth by Cyrus Teed

Koreshanity is the set of religious pseudoscientific beliefs put forth by Cyrus Teed (also known as Koresh). Followers of this belief were called "Koreshans", and most of them formed a utopian communal society called the Koreshan Unity.

== Main beliefs ==
The main beliefs of Koreshanity, or Koreshan Universalogy, are put forth in the many writings of Cyrus Teed and his followers. They are:

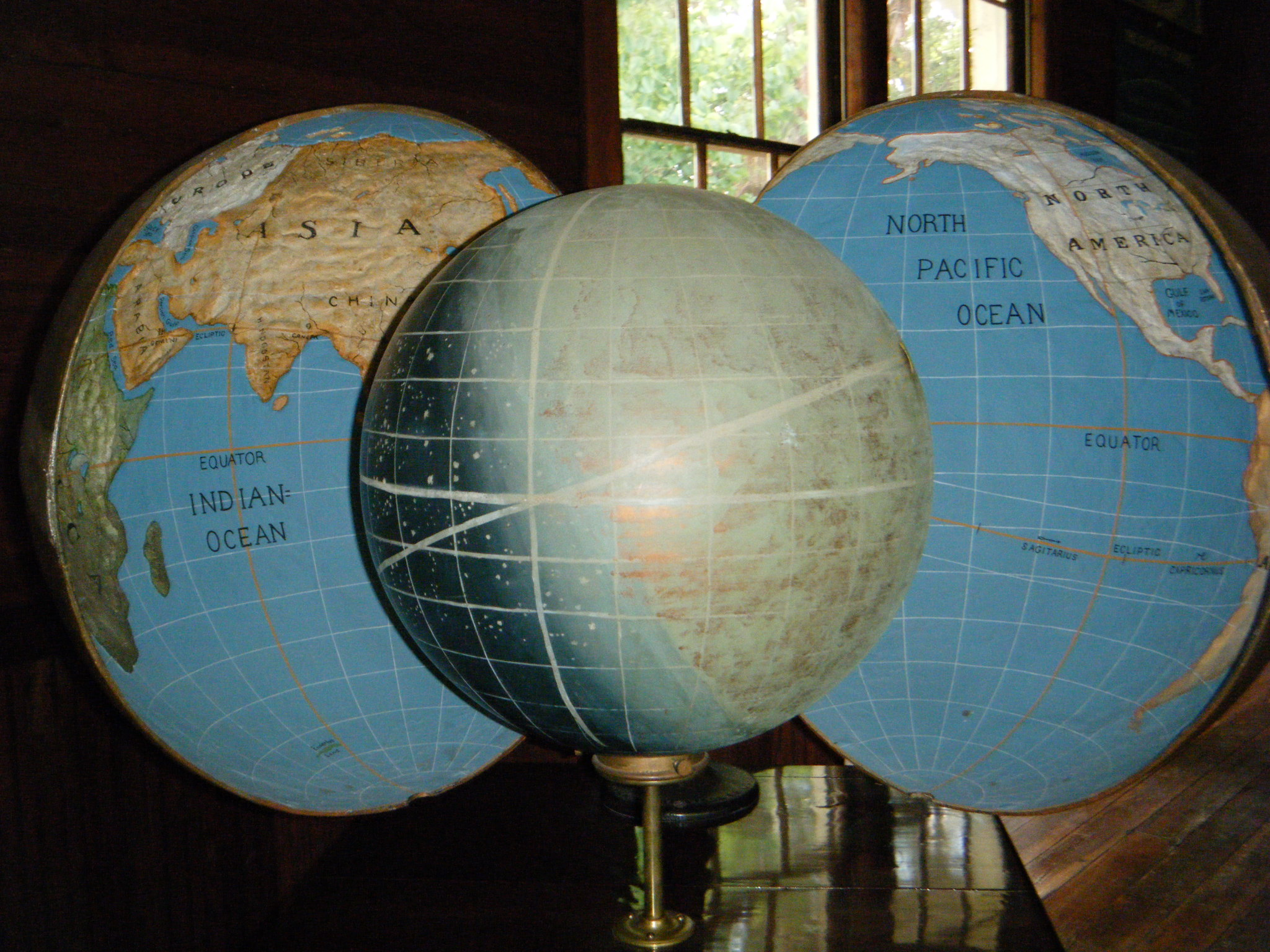
- Model of the universe according to Koreshan beliefs
  Cellular Cosmogony, which is Teed's unique form of Hollow Earth theory which puts forth the idea that the Earth and universe are contained within a concave sphere, or 'cell'. The Koreshans even conducted several experiments, similar to those conducted by believers in a Flat Earth. The most well known was conducted on the beach of Naples, Florida (the Koreshan Geodetic Survey of 1897), a town south of the Koreshan Unity commune at Estero, Florida. Here is the description of the earth from Cellular Cosmogony:

The sun is an invisible electromagnetic battery revolving in the universe's center on a 24-year cycle. Our visible sun is only a reflection, as is the moon, with the stars reflecting off seven mercurial discs that float in the sphere's center. Inside the earth there are three separate atmospheres: the first composed of oxygen and nitrogen and closest to the earth; the second, a hydrogen atmosphere above it; the third, an aboron atmosphere at the center. The earth's shell is one hundred miles thick and has seventeen layers. The outer seven are metallic with a gold rind on the outermost layer, the middle five are mineral and the five inward are geologic strata. Inside the shell there is life, outside a void.

- Koreshan Premise, A straight line extended at right angles from a perpendicular post will meet the surface of the earth at a distance proportionate to the height of the perpendicular.

== Other beliefs ==
- Reincarnation, the belief that people are reborn.
- Immortality, the belief people will not die.
- Celibacy, the belief of abstaining from any sexual conduct, which they felt was a scientific method to obtain immortality.
- Collectivism, the community lived communally, with everyone sharing in the work without being paid. This began with the first commune in Chicago, leading to them moving to Estero and building their "New Jerusalem".
- Alchemy, which was an area that Teed had experimented in for years.
- Teed's inspired leadership. Teed claimed to be the 'seventh' messianic leader (Jesus was the sixth).

== Koreshan settlement ==
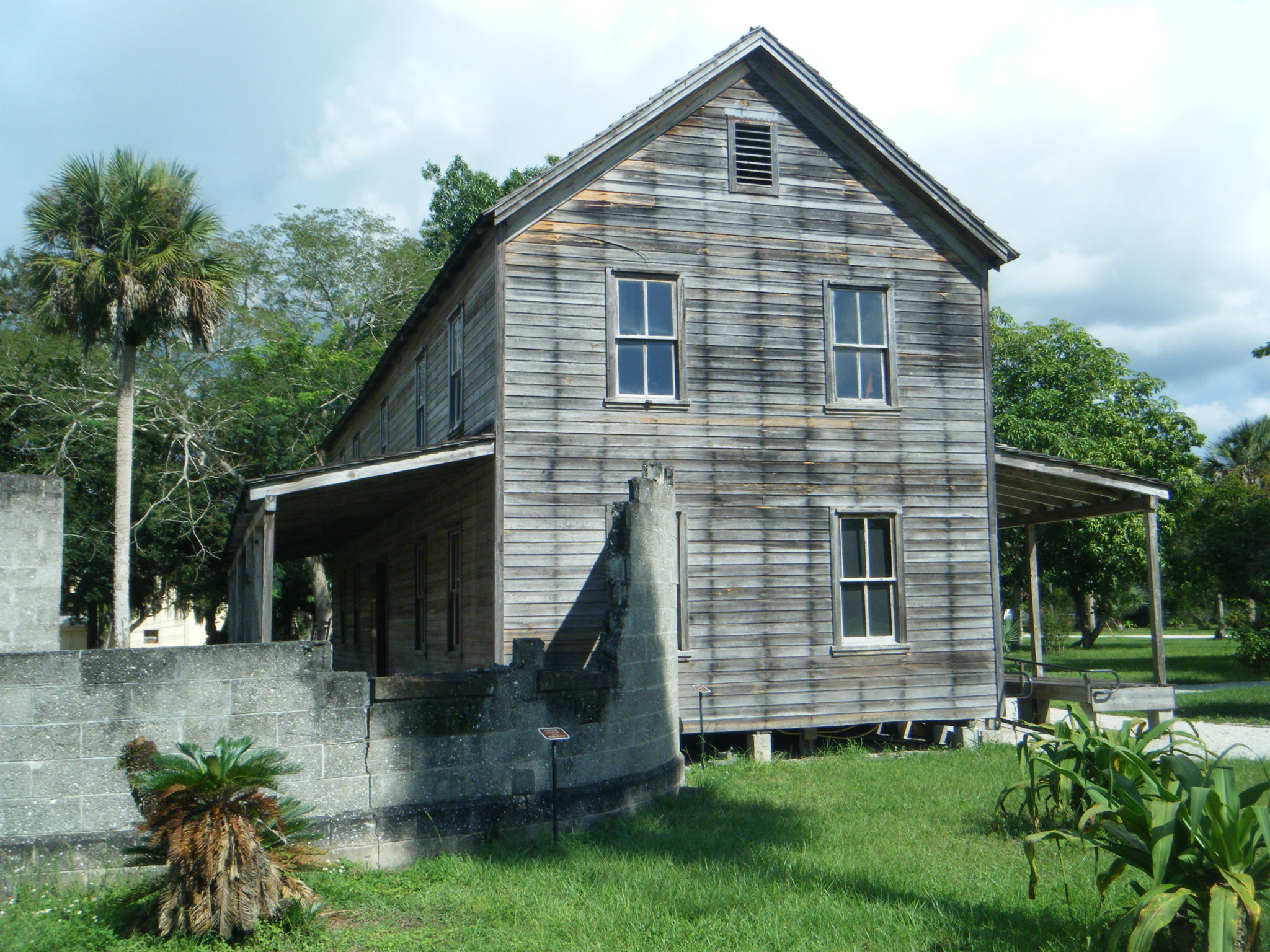
Dr. Teed's House

Teed proposed the creation of a "New Jerusalem" as an ideal commune for his followers, to be located on the Mississippi river. In 1894 Teed moved to Florida where he accumulated land for yet another community. He was influenced, according to historian Robert S. Fogarty, by Emanuel Swedenborg, as was Thomas Lake Harris, and these ideas helped craft his own notion of a "new spiritual heaven…called New Jerusalem.". Teed shows the degree to which the concept of 'New Jerusalem' not only translated into the ideal of creating a heavenly place on earth but the re-labeling of heaven to constitute a New Jerusalem up above.

The day to day affairs of the settlement were governed by a council of women called "The Seven Sisters." The Seven Sisters lived in a common house referred to as The Planetary Court.

Prior to the death of the last Koreshan the settlement was deeded to the state of Florida and is now a state historic site. In addition to the historic buildings of the settlement the state park includes canoeing on the Estero river which flows directly next to the settlement as well as the presence of many gopher tortoises who make their burrows throughout the park.

== Major works of Koreshanity ==
- Cyrus Teed Cellular Cosmogony, or, the Earth a Concave Sphere. Originally published in 1905, later reprinted in 1975. Promotes arguments for a concave earth with details on their Naples experiment.
- Cyrus Teed Immortal Manhood. Published in 1902, details the relationship of man with God. The work, along with Cellular Cosmogony, are considered the pivotal works in Koreshan teachings.
- A.W.K. Andrews. The Identification of Israel. 1882. Gives the basis for their beliefs in reincarnation and its importance in building their "New Jerusalem".
- Koreshan Foundation. Koreshanity: the New Age Religion. 1971. A fairly recent reprint of 4 works by Teed and J. Augustus Weimar. Covers their beliefs in reincarnation, male-female duality of God, messianic prophecy, and more.
- Ulysses Morrow. Scientific Experiments on Lake Michigan. 1899. Details their first experiments to prove a concave sphere.
