= John Cleves Symmes Jr. =

American army officer and academic (1780–1829)

Captain John Cleves Symmes Jr.
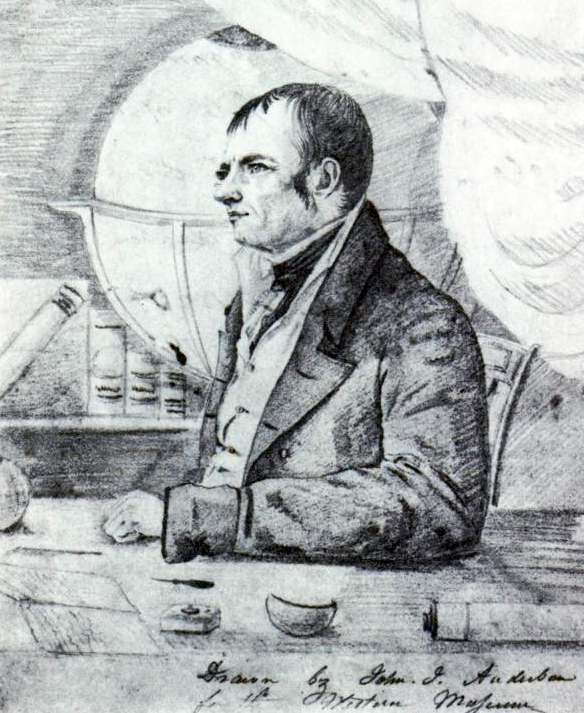
- "John Cleves Symmes Jr and His Hollow Earth" by John J. Audubon, 1820
- Born: November 5, 1780; Sussex County, New Jersey
- Died: May 28, 1829 (aged 48); Hamilton, Ohio
- Resting place: Symmes Park, Hamilton, OH; 39°23′43″N 84°33′43″W
- Monuments: Hollow Earth Monument (see below)
- Occupations: Military Officer, Trader
- Spouse: Mary Symmes (née Pelletier) (m. 1808)
- Children: Louisiana Symmes (b. 1810); Americus Symmes (b. 1811); William H. H. Symmes (b. 1813); Elizabeth Symmes (b. 1814); John Cleves Symmes (III) (b. 1824)

Signature
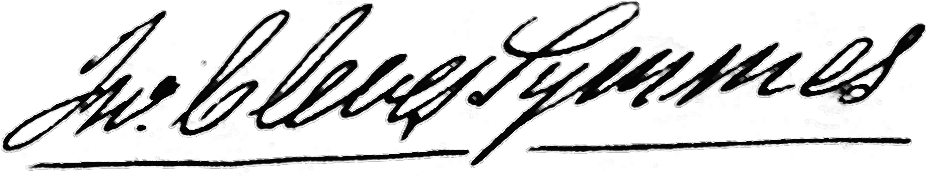

Captain John Cleves Symmes Jr. (November 5, 1780 – May 28, 1829) was an American Army officer, trader, and lecturer. Symmes is best known for his 1818 variant of the Hollow Earth theory, which introduced the concept of openings to the inner world at the poles.

== Early life ==
John Cleves Symmes Jr. was born in Sussex County, New Jersey, son of Thomas and Mercy (née Harker) Symmes. He was named for his uncle John Cleves Symmes, a delegate to the Continental Congress, a Colonel in the Revolutionary War, Chief Justice of New Jersey, father-in-law of US President William Henry Harrison and pioneer in the settlement and development of the Northwest Territory. Though Justice Symmes had no male children, the younger John Cleves Symmes was often referred to by his later military rank, or with the suffix of "Jr.", so as to distinguish him from his uncle. Symmes "received a good common English education" and on March 26, 1802, at the age of twenty-two, obtained a commission as an ensign in the US Army (with the assistance of his uncle).

He was commissioned into the 1st Infantry Regiment and was promoted to second lieutenant on May 1, 1804, to first lieutenant on July 29, 1807, and to captain on January 20, 1813. In 1807, Symmes fought a pistol duel with Lieutenant Marshall. Symmes suffered a wound in his wrist; Marshall one in his thigh. Afterwards, the two men became friends. On December 25, 1808, Symmes married Mary Anne Lockwood (nee. Pelletier), a widow with six children, all of whom he was to raise alongside his own children by Mary.

During the War of 1812, Symmes was initially stationed in Missouri Territory until 1814 when his 1st Infantry Regiment was sent to Canada, arriving just in time to provide relief to American forces at the Battle of Lundy's Lane. Symmes also served during the Siege of Fort Erie, and continued in his Army career until being honorably discharged on June 15, 1815.

After leaving the Army, Symmes moved to St. Louis (then a frontier settlement) and went into business as a trader. He sold supplies to Army, and obtained a license to trade with the Fox Indians. However, his business venture was unsuccessful and in 1819, Symmes moved his family to Newport, KY. But while failing as a trader, Symmes was contemplating the rings of Saturn and developing his theory of the Hollow Earth—a theory which he would spend the remainder of his life promoting.

== Hollow Earth theory ==
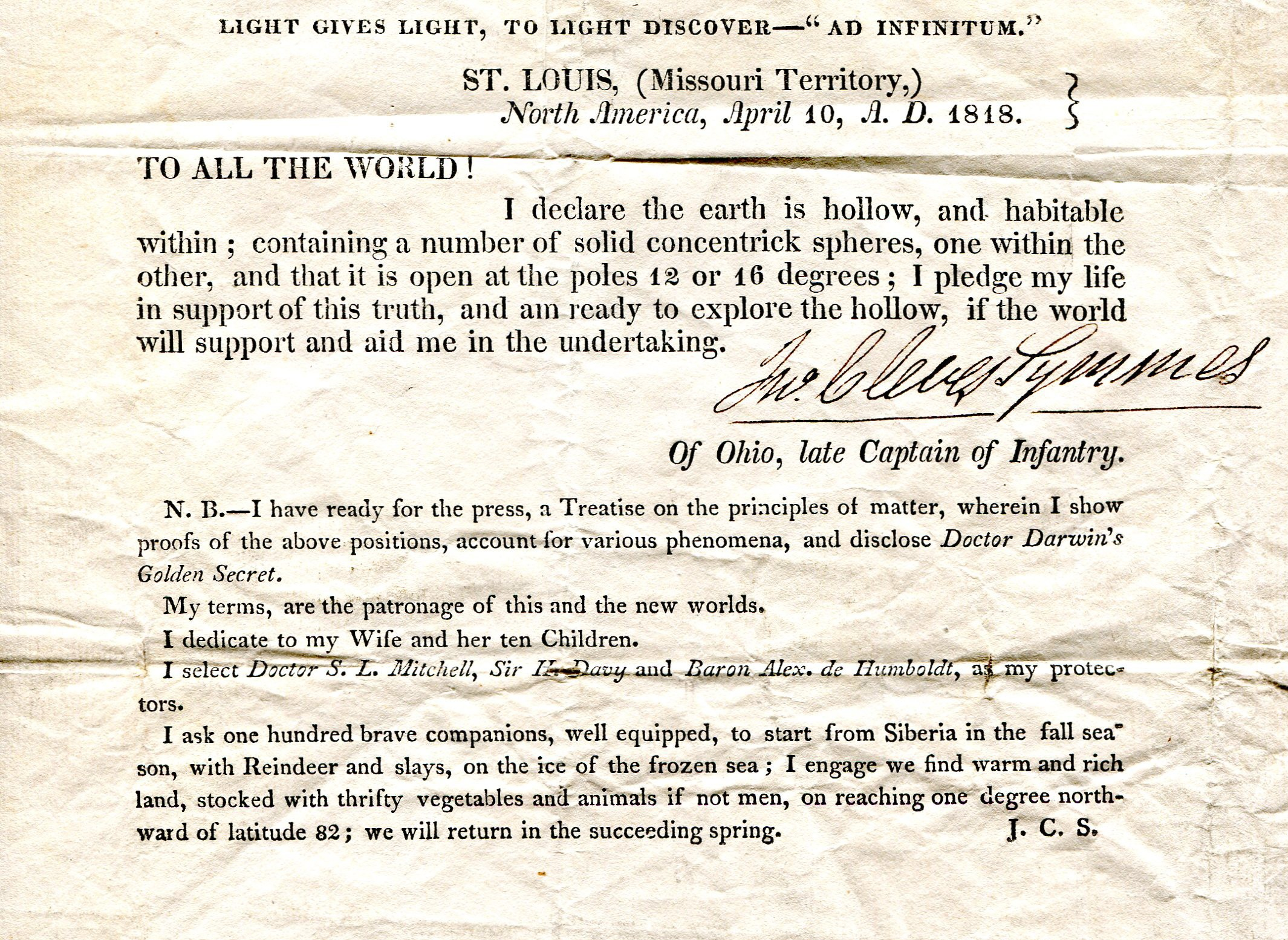
Symmes' Circular No. 1, 1818

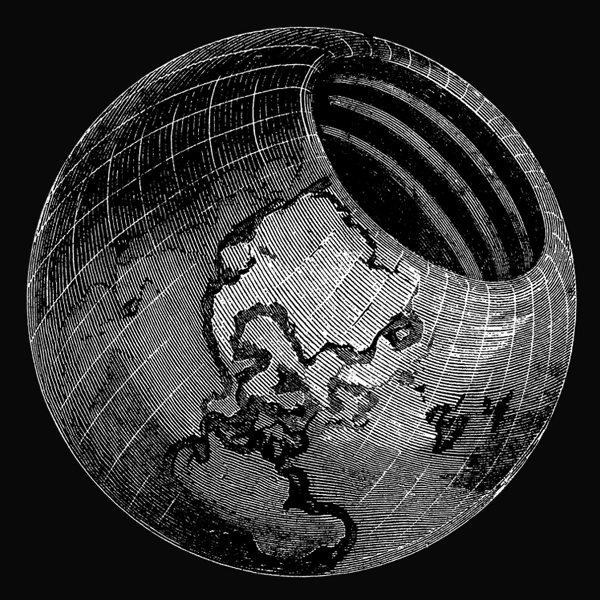
Illustration from Symmes's Theory of Concentric Spheres ... , 1878

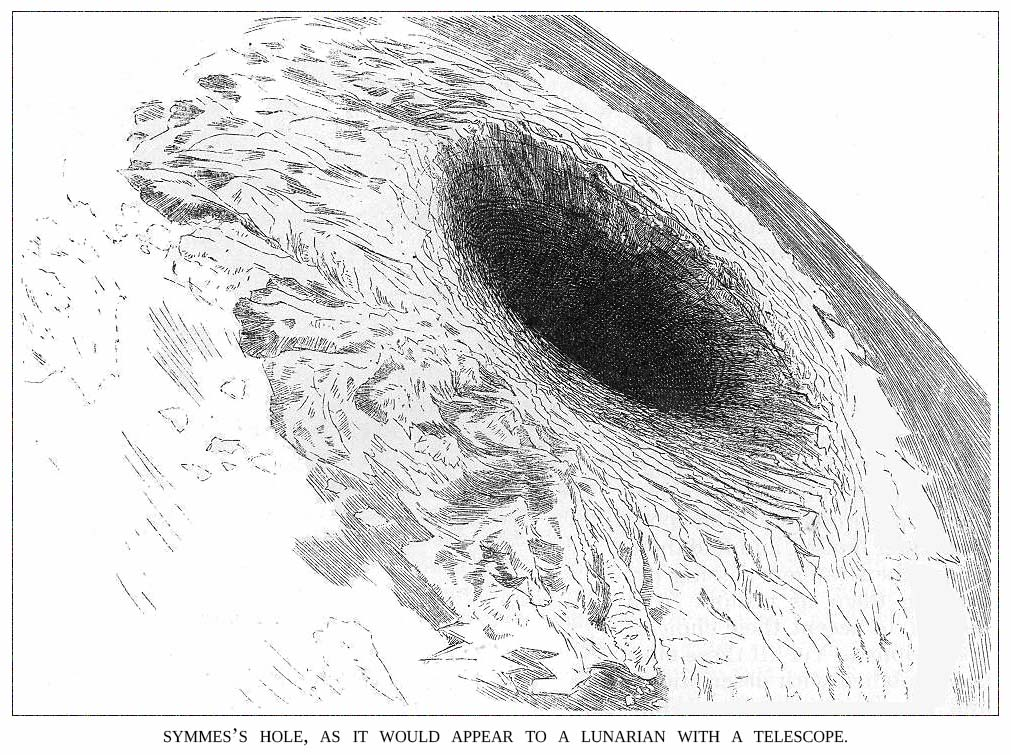
Symmes Hole, from Harper's New Monthly Magazine, 1882

I declare the earth is hollow, and habitable within; containing a number of solid concentrick spheres, one within the other, and that it is open at the poles 12 or 16 degrees; I pledge my life in support of this truth, and am ready to explore the hollow, if the world will support and aid me in the undertaking.

— John Cleves Symmes Jr., Symmes' Circular No. 1

=== Declaration and reaction ===
On April 10, 1818, Symmes announced his Hollow Earth hypothesis to the world, publishing his Circular No. 1. While a few enthusiastic supporters would ultimately lionize Symmes as the "Newton of the West", in general the world was not impressed.

Symmes had sent his declaration (at considerable cost to himself) to "each notable foreign government, reigning prince, legislature, city, college, and philosophical societies, throughout the union, and to individual members of our National Legislature, as far as the five hundred copies would go." Symmes's son Americus wrote of the reaction to Circular No. 1 in 1878, recounting "[i]ts reception by the public can easily be imagined; it was overwhelmed with ridicule as the production of a distempered imagination, or the result of partial insanity. It was for many years a fruitful source of jest with the newspapers." Symmes, though, was not deterred. He began a campaign of circulars, newspaper letters, and lectures aimed at defending and promoting his hypothesis of a Hollow Earth—and to build support for a polar expedition to vindicate his theory.

Monument of John Cleves Symmes Jr. in Symmes Park

=== Symmes's theory ===
In its original form, Symmes's Hollow Earth theory described the world as consisting of five concentric spheres, with our outer earth and its atmosphere as the largest. He visualized the Earth's crust as being approximately 1,000 miles (1,610 km) thick, with an Arctic opening about 4,000 miles (6,450 km) wide, and an Antarctic opening around 6,000 miles (9,650 km) wide. Symmes proposed that the curvature of the rim of these polar openings was gradual enough that it would be possible to actually enter the inner earth without being aware of the transition. He argued that due to the centrifugal force of Earth's rotation, the Earth would be flattened at the poles, leading to a vast passage into the inner Earth. Symmes's concept of polar openings connecting the Earth's surface to the inner Earth was to be his unique contribution to Hollow Earth lore. Such polar openings would come to be known as "Symmes Holes" in literary Hollow Earths.

Symmes held that the inner surfaces of the concentric spheres in his Hollow Earth would be illuminated by sunlight reflected off of the outer surface of the next sphere down and would be habitable, being a "warm and rich land, stocked with thrifty vegetables and animals if not men". He also believed that the spheres revolved at different rates and upon different axes, and that the apparent instability of magnetic North in the Arctic could be explained by travelers moving unawares across and along the verge between the inner and outer earths.

Symmes generalized his theory beyond just the Earth, claiming that "the Earth as well as all the celestial orbicular bodies existing in the inverse, visible and invisible, which partake in any degree of a planetary nature, from the greatest to the smallest, from the sun down to the most minute blazing meteor or falling star, are all constituted, in a greater or less degree, of a collection of spheres".

Ultimately, Symmes was to simplify his theory, abandoning the series of concentric inner spheres, and teaching "only one concentric sphere (a hollow earth), not five" by the time he embarked on his lecture tour of the East Coast.

=== Origins of Symmes's theory ===
Writing in August 1817 to his stepson, Anthony Lockwood, Symmes for the first time stated that "I infer that all planets and globes are hollow". But Symmes' theory was far from unprecedented. While the idea of polar openings leading into a Hollow Earth was Symmes' innovation, the concept of a Hollow Earth had an intellectual pedigree dating back to the 17th century and Edmond Halley. Halley proposed his Hollow Earth theory as an explanation for the different locations of the geographic and magnetic poles of the Earth. While Halley's contemporaries found the geomagnetic data he had gathered to be of interest, his proposal of a Hollow Earth was never widely accepted. The theory remained dear to Halley; he chose to have his final portrait (as Astronomer Royal) painted depicting him holding a drawing of the Earth's interior as a set of concentric spheres. Some scholars have proposed that Symmes may have learned of Halley's Hollow Earth via Cotton Mather's book, The Christian Philosopher, a popular survey of science as natural theology.

Swiss mathematician Leonhard Euler has often been claimed as a proponent of a Hollow Earth theory. The version of the Hollow Earth theory ascribed to Euler lacked the concentric spheres of Halley's proposal, but added the element of an interior sun. But Euler may never have actually suggested any such thing; Euler scholar, C. Edward Sandifer, has examined Euler's writings and found no evidence for any such belief.

Whether or not Euler ever proposed a Hollow Earth, Symmes and some of his contemporaries certainly thought Euler had. In an 1824 exchanges of newspaper letters with Symmes, D. Preston implied that Symmes' theory was not original, and cited both Halley and Euler as earlier examples. Symmes himself insisted that he had not known of Hollow Earth proposals of Halley and Euler at the time he conceived his theory, and that he had only learned of their works much later. Symmes' disciple, James McBride, promoting and explaining Symmes' theory in his book, Symmes's Theory of Concentric Spheres (1826), cited Euler as an earlier proponent of a similar theory.

=== Circulars, lectures, and Symzonia ===
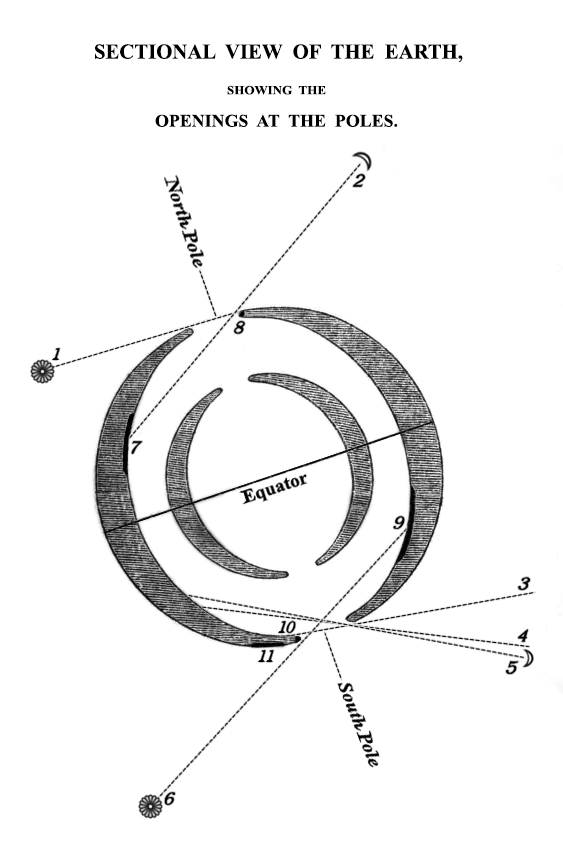
Frontispiece to Symzonia.

For the first two years after the publication of his theory, Symmes confined his promotional efforts to circulars and letters published in newspapers and magazines. In all, he issued seven additional circulars from 1818 to 1819, including Light Between the Spheres, which gained a national audience via its publication in the National Intelligencer. But though Symmes made converts, his theory continued to be greeted with general ridicule.

In 1819, Symmes moved his family from St. Louis to Newport, Kentucky. And in 1820, Symmes began to promote his theory directly, lecturing on it in Cincinnati and other towns and cities in the region, making use of a wooden globe with the polar sections removed to reveal the inner Earth and the spheres within. (Symmes's modified globe can now be found in the collection of Academy of Natural Sciences of Drexel University.) Symmes was not a commanding lecturer; he was uncomfortable as a public speaker, hesitant in speaking, and possessed a nasal voice. Still, he persevered.

Symmes began to make converts and his ideas began to filter into the public consciousness, and popular support for his proposed Arctic expedition started to build. In 1820, he sat for a never-completed portrait by artist John J. Audubon for Cincinnati's Western Museum. Audubon wrote on the back of the sketch, "John, Cleeves Simms—The man with the hole at the Pole—Drawn and a good likeness it is".

Some have claimed he was the real author of: Symzonia; Voyage of Discovery, which was attributed to "Captain Adam Seaborn". A recent reprint gives him as the author. Other researchers argue against this idea. Some think it was written as a satire of Symmes's ideas, and believe they identified the author as early American writer Nathaniel Ames.

=== McBride and Reynolds—the disciples ===
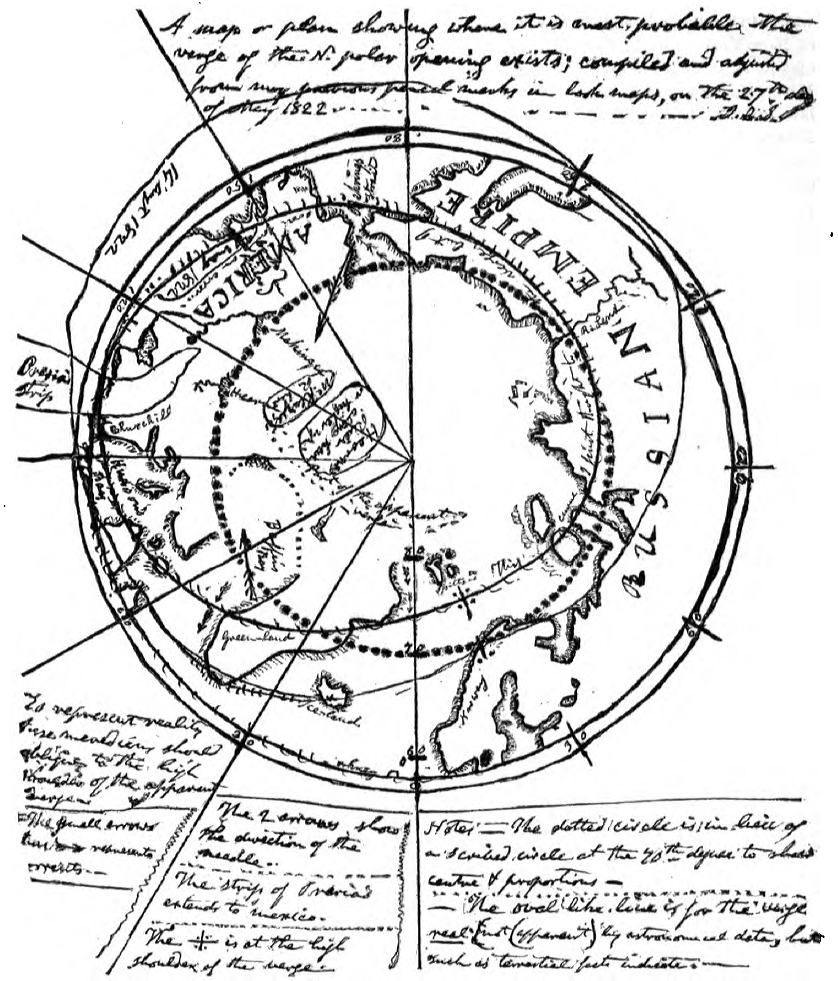
Map of the northern polar regions hand drawn by John Cleves Symmes Jr.

Symmes himself never wrote a book of his ideas, as he was too busy expounding them on the lecture circuit, but others did. His follower James McBride wrote and published Symmes' Theory of Concentric Spheres in 1826. Another follower, Jeremiah N. Reynolds apparently had an article that was published as a separate booklet in 1827: Remarks of Symmes' Theory Which Appeared in the American Quarterly Review. In 1868 a professor W.F. Lyons published The Hollow Globe which put forth a Symmes-like Hollow Earth theory, but did not mention Symmes. Symmes's son Americus then republished The Symmes' Theory of Concentric Spheres to set the record straight.

== Legacy ==
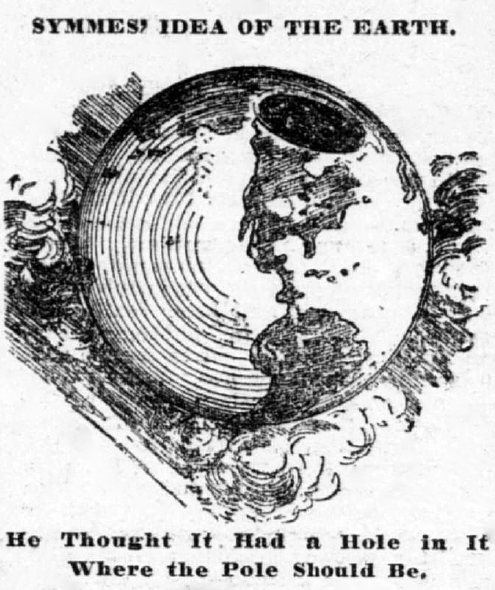
Symmes's Hole—in the papers over 50 years after his death.

=== Americus Symmes ===
Symmes's death left his eldest son, seventeen-year-old Americus Symmes, the sole support of the family, with an estate significantly in debt. Americus provided for his mother and siblings and paid off his father's debts. He also championed his father's legacy, erecting a memorial to him (a pylon topped with a globe carved in the shape of a hollow sphere) and publishing in 1878 an edited collection of his father's papers, Symmes's Theory of Concentric Spheres: Demonstrating That the Earth is Hollow, Habitable Within, and Widely Open About the Poles, Compiled by Americus Symmes, from the Writings of his Father, Capt. John Cleves Symmes (not to be confused with the book of a very similar title published by James McBride in 1826).

=== Literary ===
Edgar Allan Poe's short story "MS. Found in a Bottle" (1833), which describes a ship driven toward the South Pole by a storm and consumed by a whirlpool there, may have been inspired by Symmes' assertions, or have been intended as a satire of Symzonia itself.

Symmes features as the source of information about the hollow Earth used as a literary trope in Grigsby, Alcanoan O and Mary P. Lowe's "Nequa, or The Problem of the Ages" (1900).

Compare a fictional echo of Symmes in Ian Wedde's Symmes Hole (1987); and a focus on both Symmes and Reynolds in James Chapman's Our Plague: A Film From New York (1993).

Symmes' work is referenced in Vladimir Obruchev's 1915 novel Plutonia.

John Cleves Symmes also makes an appearance in Rudy Rucker's steampunk novel, The Hollow Earth, and in Felix J. Palma's The Map of the Sky.

Samuel Highgate Syme, the subject of The Syme Papers in Benjamin Markovits's book of the same name, is based on John Cleves Symmes.
