= Ohio State Bar Association =

Ohio-based organization

The Ohio State Bar Association
- Type: Legal Society
- Headquarters: Columbus, OH
- Location: United States
- Members: 27,000+ in 2012
- Website: https://www.ohiobar.org

The Ohio State Bar Association (OSBA) is a voluntary bar association for the state of Ohio.

== History ==
OSBA was founded on March 6, 1880, when the Cleveland Bar Association issued a call to other Ohio local bar associations to meet at Case Hall in Cleveland. More than 400 lawyers met on July 8 to form the Association; Rufus P. Ranney was chosen as its first president.

Today, membership includes almost 70 percent of all Ohio law practitioners. With the addition of paralegals, law students and other associate members, total membership is about 31,000. The OSBA does not license attorneys to practice law in Ohio; that function is administered by the Ohio Supreme Court.

The association was founded in 1880 and is based in the state capital of Columbus.
