= Cyrus Teed =

American physician and religious leader (1839–1908)

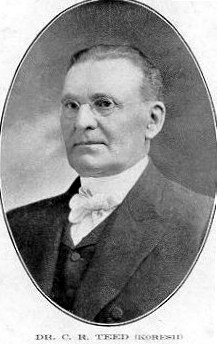
- Born: October 10, 1839; Trout Creek, New York, U.S.
- Died: December 22, 1908 (aged 69); Estero, Florida, U.S.
- Known for: Founder of Koreshanity and the Koreshan Unity
- Notable work: The Immortal Manhood: The Laws and Processes of Its Attainment in the Flesh
- Children: Douglas Arthur Teed

Cyrus Reed Teed (October 18, 1839 – December 22, 1908) was a U.S. eclectic physician and alchemist turned pseudoscientific religious leader and self-proclaimed messiah. In 1869, claiming divine inspiration, Teed took on the name Koresh and proposed a new set of scientific and religious ideas which he called Koreshanity, including the belief in the existence of a concave, or "cellular", Hollow Earth cosmology positing that the sky, humanity, and the surface of the Earth exist on the inside of a universe-encompassing sphere.

In New York in the 1870s, he founded the Koreshan Unity, a commune whose rule of conduct was based on his teachings. Other similar communities were established in Chicago and San Francisco. After 1894, the group concentrated itself in the small Florida town of Estero, seeking to build a "New Jerusalem" in that locale, peaking at 250 residents during the first decade of the 20th century. Following Teed's death late in 1908 the group went into decline, finally disappearing in 1961, leaving the Koreshan State Historic Site behind.

== Biography ==
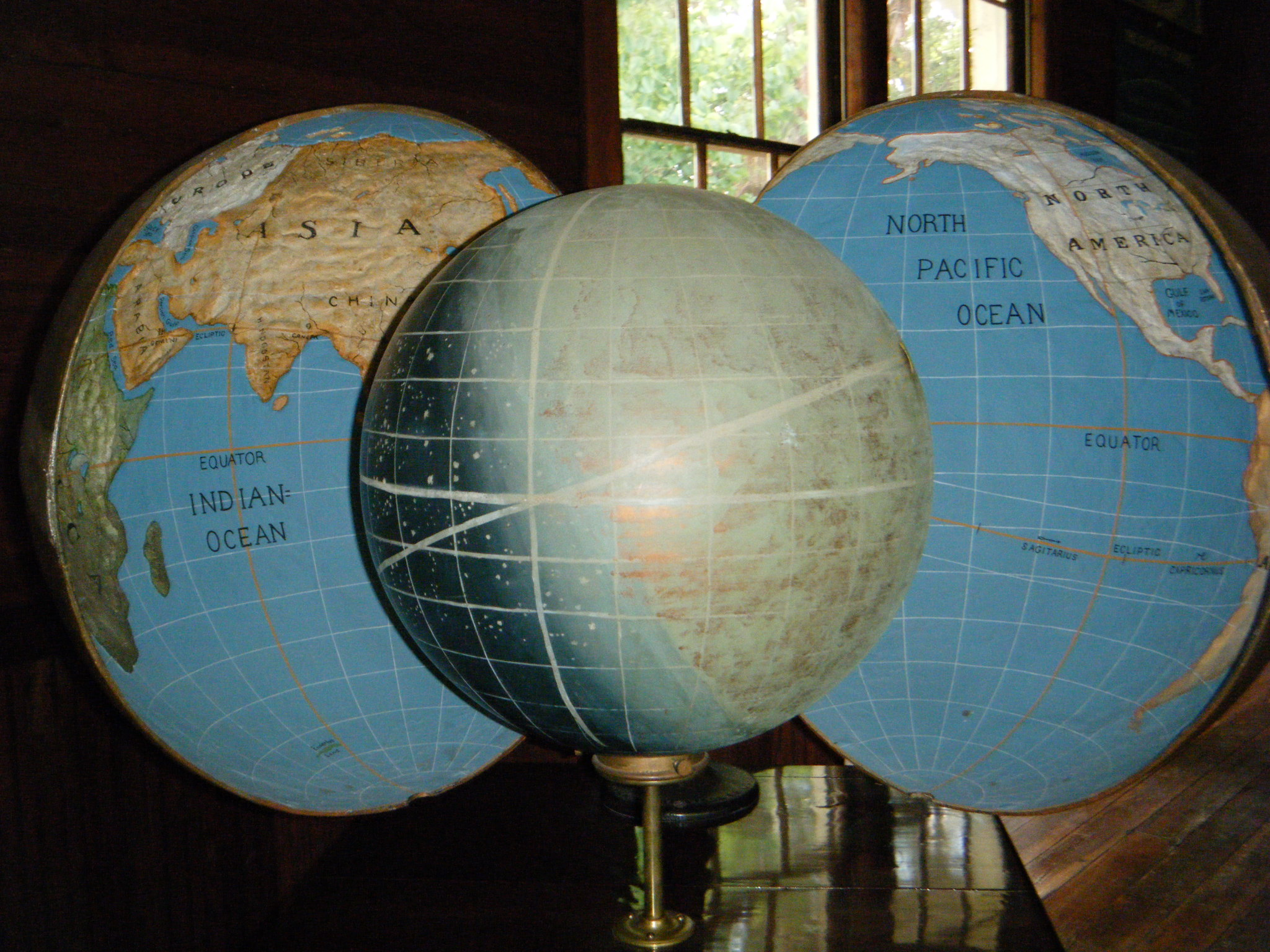
Model of the universe according to the Koreshans

=== Early life ===
Teed was born October 18, 1839, in Trout Creek, New York, to Sarah and Jesse Teed. Cyrus grew up in Utica, New York, and, after leaving school at age 11, went to work on the Erie Canal as a driver of the animals that pulled the boats along. Cyrus was a distant relative of Joseph Smith, founder of the Latter Day Saint movement.

Teed studied medicine before opening a medical practice in Utica, New York.

=== Koreshanity ===
As a young eclectic physician, Teed was always interested in unconventional experiments, such as alchemy, often involving dangerously high levels of electricity. In the autumn of 1869, during an experiment he was badly shocked, and passed out. Teed reported "a relaxation at the... back part of the brain, and a peculiar buzzing tension at the forehead." He claimed his soul left his body and witnessed a woman whom he perceived as "His Mother and Bride." Teed claimed this was a calling to spread the word on the true nature of our cellular cosmogony, and to bridge the gap between science and religion. Cyrus described the messenger as:

"Gracefully pendant from the head, and falling in golden tresses of profusely luxuriant growth over her shoulders, her hair added to the adornment of her personal attractiveness. Supported by the shoulders and falling into a long train was a gold and purple colored robe. Her feet rested upon a silvery crescent; in her hand, and resting upon this crescent, was Mercury's Caduceus..."

During his period of unconsciousness, Teed believed he was visited by a divine spirit who told him that he was the messiah. Inspired, once he awoke Teed vowed to apply his scientific knowledge to "redeem humanity." He promptly changed his first name to "Koresh," the Hebrew version of "Cyrus". There was an awakening in the Teed household hinging on dogmatic opinions, mysticism, and the exotic. The family did not buy into the new lifestyle, however, and eventually the family lost Teed to the religious fervor which consumed him.

Teed denounced the idea that the Earth revolved around the Sun and instead pioneered his own theory of the Universe, known as the Cellular Cosmogony. According to this theory, human beings live on the inside of the planet, not the outside; also, the sun is a giant battery-operated contraption, and the stars mere refractions of its light.

Teed persisted in his beliefs, neglecting his duties at home. His ideas, called Koreshanity, caught on with others. Koreshanity preached cellular cosmogony, alchemy, reincarnation, immortality, celibacy, communism, and a number of other radical ideas. Teed started preaching Koreshanity in the 1870s in New York, forming the Koreshan Unity, later moving to Chicago.

The American Eagle of August 1973 reports that letters from Teed indicated affection for his wife Delia and their son, and despite criticism, Delia accepted him as the messianic personality of the age. However, they never converted to Teed's beliefs. Due to ill health, Delia and their son moved in with her sister in Binghamton, New York. They remained there until Delia's death in 1885.

=== Communal leader ===
One of Teed's fundamental principles involved the gathering of his most devoted followers into communal living groups. A first commune was formed in Chicago in 1888. By 1902 a second Koreshan community was established in that city. Other followers of the so-called Koreshan Unity formed a short-lived community in San Francisco, which lasted from 1891 to 1892. Small church groups existed in other towns.

In 1894 Teed's followers began to congregate in a small Florida town called Estero, where Teed planned to form a "New Jerusalem." The two Chicago societies, including the group's printing plant, were subsequently shut down and moved to Florida. The colony was extensively landscaped and bedecked with numerous exotic tropical plants. The Koreshans built extensively, establishing a bakery, general store, concrete works, power plant, and "World College of Life" in the community. They also published their newspaper from the site, called The Flaming Sword.

The "golden age" of the Koreshan Unity in Estero was 1903 to 1908, when they had over 250 residents and incorporated the town, its territory embracing some 110 square miles — the fifth largest area of any city in the United States at the time.

They tried to run several candidates for county government against the local Democratic Party, but were never successful.

=== Death and legacy ===
On October 13, 1906, while meeting the 1:30 pm Atlantic Coast Line train from Baltimore, a group of Koreshans got into a fight in front of R. W. Gillams' grocery store in Ft. Myers, Teed tried to break it up and he was severely beaten by a Marshal Sanchez, suffering injuries from which he never recovered. He died on December 22, 1908.

Teed's followers initially expected his resurrection, after which he and his faithful would be taken up to heaven as he had predicted in his book The Immortal Manhood. They kept a constant vigil over his body for two days, after which time it began to show signs of decay. Following Christmas the county health officer stepped in to order his burial. After his death the group went into decline.

The last remaining follower, Hedwig Michel, deeded what remained of the colony, some 350 acres of land, to the State of Florida in 1961. Following Michel's death in 1982, the site became known as the Koreshan State Historic Site.

Cyrus Teed's son, Douglas Arthur Teed, was an American Impressionist painter, but not a follower of his father's teachings. Douglas did, however, seek out his father later in life, visiting the Koreshan Unity in 1905. An article in the Fort Myers Press expressed gratitude toward south Florida receiving such a distinguished painter, and suggested the possibility of Douglas remaining in the state to paint. There are numerous accounts in the communal paper espousing the talents of the artist son of Koresh.

A special hall was built to house 27 of Douglas's works, which were painted especially for the commune. The people of the Unity were flattered by his interpretation of Estero, and the uncharted surrounding Florida land. Many of these works were painted in an egg-tempera and have faded quite badly. Only a few paintings retain the artist's original intent; one such painting, "Tropical Dawn" was presented to a member of the Unity, Victoria Gratia, at her birthday celebration in April 1905.

It seemed the relationship between father and son was on good terms; Douglas even dedicated a poem to his father for his birthday (known to the Unity as "The Solar Festival") on October 18, 1905, entitled, The Lost Muse. However, in 1907 Douglas sued the Koreshan Unity for overdue payment, citing the paintings which hung in the Art Hall. In 1908, a full settlement was made out of court between Douglas and the Unity, the year Teed died.

== See also ==
- List of messiah claimants
- Messiah complex

== Works ==
- The Immortal Manhood: The Laws and Processes of Its Attainment in the Flesh. Chicago, IL: Guiding Star Publishing House, 1902.
- The Cellular Cosmogony; or, The Earth a Concave Sphere. With Ulysses G. Morrow. Estero, FL: Guiding Star Publishing House, 1905.
