= Charles Johnson (wide receiver, born 1989) =

American football player (born 1989)

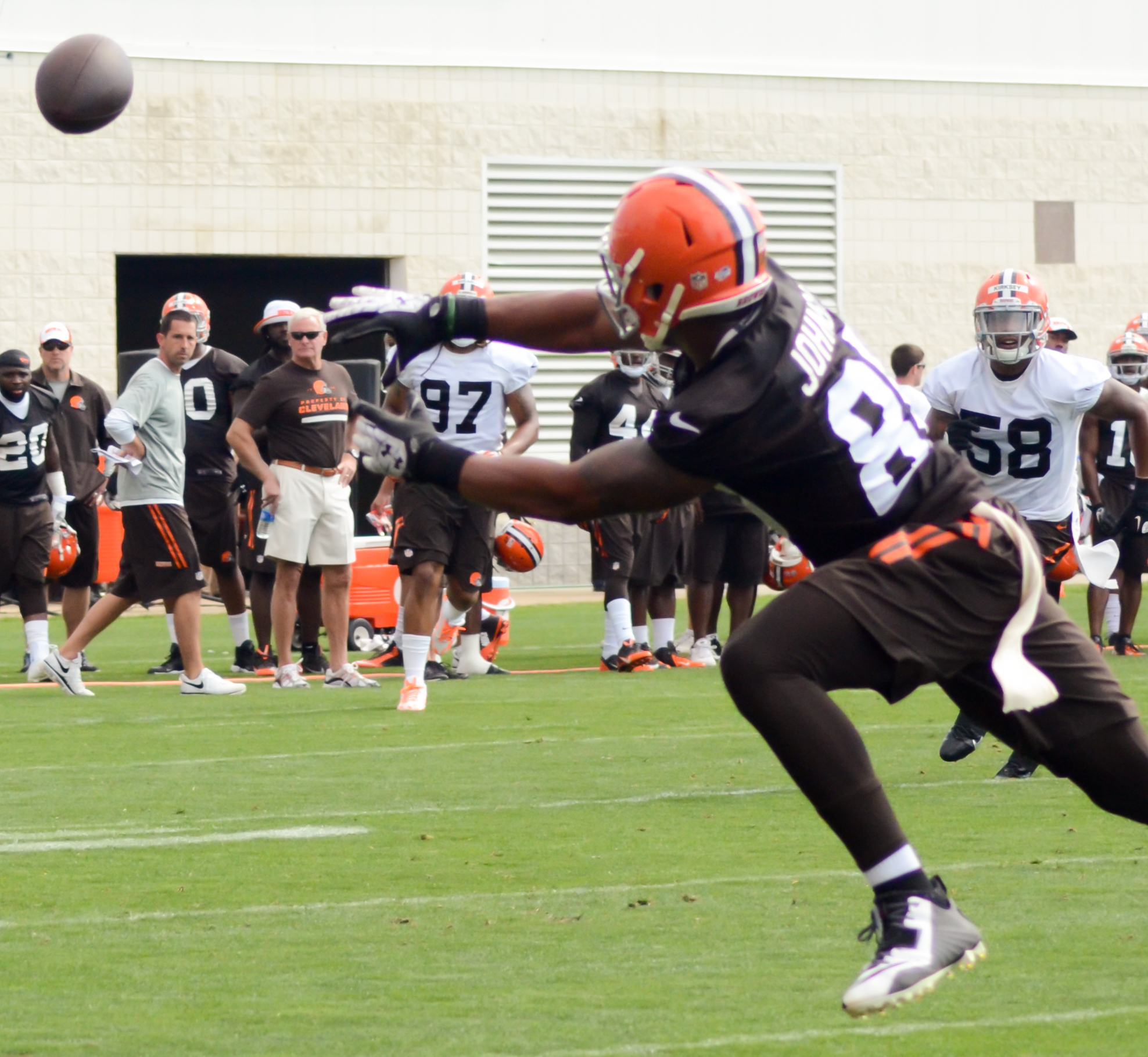
- Johnson with the Cleveland Browns in 2014

No. 12, 80
- Position: Wide receiver

Personal information
- Born: February 27, 1989 (age 37); Elsmere, Kentucky, U.S.
- Listed height: 6 ft 2 in (1.88 m)
- Listed weight: 217 lb (98 kg)

Career information
- High school: Lloyd Memorial (Erlanger, Kentucky)
- College: Eastern Kentucky (2009); Grand Valley State (2010-2012)
- NFL draft: 2013: 7th round, 216th overall pick

Career history
- Green Bay Packers (2013)*; Cleveland Browns (2013–2014); Minnesota Vikings (2014–2016); Carolina Panthers (2017); New York Jets (2018)*; Orlando Apollos (2019); Philadelphia Eagles (2019)*
- * Offseason or practice squad member only

Career NFL statistics
- Receptions: 60
- Receiving yards: 834
- Receiving touchdowns: 2
- Stats at Pro Football Reference

Charles David Johnson (born February 27, 1989) is an American former professional football player who was a wide receiver in the National Football League (NFL). After playing college football for the Grand Valley State Lakers, he was selected by the Green Bay Packers in the seventh round of the 2013 NFL draft. He was also a member of the Cleveland Browns, Minnesota Vikings, Carolina Panthers, New York Jets and Philadelphia Eagles. In 2019, he played for the Alliance of American Football (AAF) on the Orlando Apollos and led the league with 687 receiving yards in eight games.

== Early life ==
Johnson graduated from Lloyd Memorial High School in Erlanger, Kentucky, where he was a four-sport star in football, baseball, basketball and track. He played as a wide receiver for the Lloyd Memorial Juggernauts football team. He earned All-state and All-conference honors as a junior and senior. As a junior, he hauled in 26 catches for 600 yards and six touchdowns. In his senior year, he caught 38 passes for 567 yards and five touchdowns.

Johnson was also a star in baseball and track at Lloyd Memorial. Johnson first started playing baseball as a shortstop and pitcher, but switched to football as a junior. In track & field, Johnson lettered all four years competing in sprints and jumps. At the 2007 KHSAA 2A State T&F Meet, he took fourth in the 100-meter dash with a time of 11.05 seconds, while also placing third in the 200-meter dash with a time of 23.13 seconds. In 2010, he captured a regional title in the pole vault after clearing a height of 3.53 meters (11 feet, 6 inches).

== College career ==
Prior to attending Grand Valley State University, Johnson spent one year at Eastern Kentucky University, where he appeared in 11 games and caught three passes for 63 yards. He also attended Antelope Valley College for one year, where he caught 24 passes for 231 yards and three touchdowns.

In 2010, Johnson was redshirted and did not play. As a junior in 2011, he caught 56 passes for 1,030 yards and 15 touchdowns, breaking the 100-yard receiving mark in five games. He was named a first-team All-GLIAC GVSU Offensive Skill Player of the Year and GVSU Offensive Skill Player of the Year. In his senior year, he caught 72 passes for 1,199 yards and 16 touchdowns.

== Professional career ==
=== Pre-draft ===
Pre-draft measurables
Height	Weight	Arm length	Hand span	Wingspan	40-yard dash	10-yard split	20-yard split	20-yard shuttle	Three-cone drill	Vertical jump	Broad jump	Bench press
6 ft 2 in (1.88 m)	215 lb (98 kg)	30 1/2 in (0.77 m)	9 1/4 in (0.23 m)	6 ft 0 in (1.83 m)	4.39 s	1.53 s	2.51 s	4.31 s	7.04 s	39.5 in (1.00 m)	11 ft 1 in (3.38 m)	14 reps
All values from GVSU'S Pro Day

Johnson was not invited to perform at the 2013 NFL Scouting Combine, but he performed well at GVSU's "Pro Day", as he would have placed among the top performers at the combine in the 40-yard dash (4.39 seconds), vertical jump (39 1/2 inches) and broad jump (11 ft 1 in). Before his Pro Day, he had guaranteed that he'd run a 4.39 in the 40-yard dash.

=== Green Bay Packers ===
Johnson was selected in the seventh round with the 216th overall pick by the Green Bay Packers in the 2013 NFL draft. He spent the preseason with the Packers before being signed to the practice squad on September 2, 2013.

=== Cleveland Browns ===
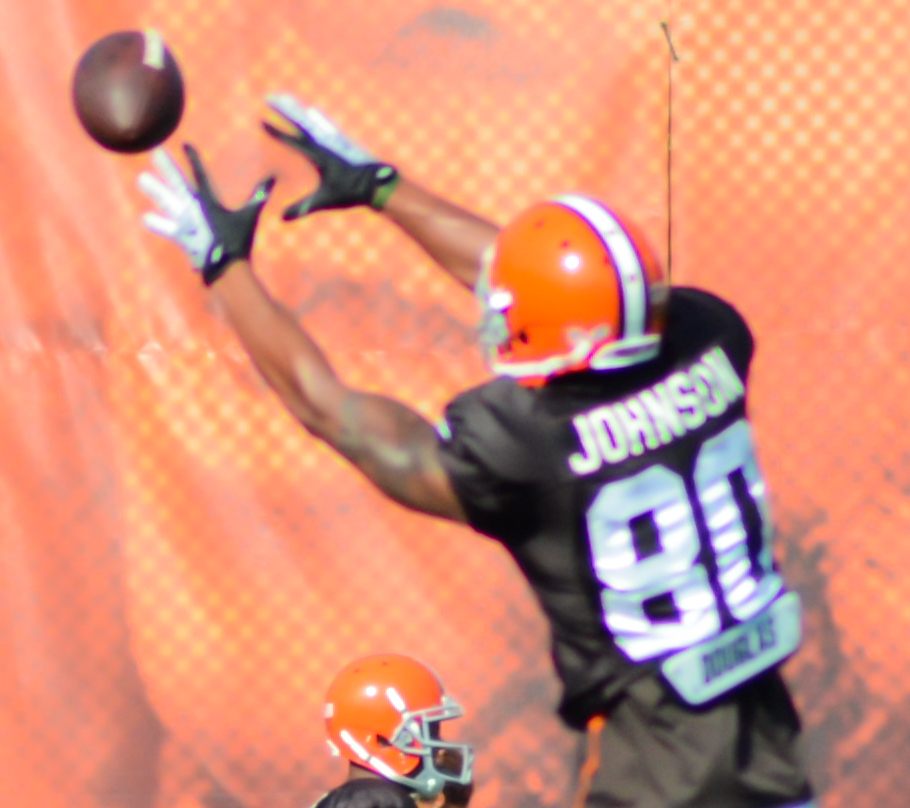
Johnson with the Browns in 2014

Johnson was signed by the Cleveland Browns off the Packers practice squad on October 12, 2013, four days before being placed on reserved/non-football injury.

=== Minnesota Vikings ===
==== 2014 season ====
On September 20, 2014, the Minnesota Vikings signed Johnson off the Browns' practice squad. After spending the entire 2013 season on the Packers and Browns practice squads, Johnson had a breakout first season for the Vikings in 2014. He was inactive on game day for the opening 2 contests of the season, but ended up playing in 11 games with 6 starts. In Week 5, he appeared in his first career NFL game against the team that drafted him at Green Bay, finishing the game with a catch for seven yards. In his first start against the Green Bay Packers on November 23, he caught his first career touchdown on a 22-yard pass from Teddy Bridgewater. In the Vikings' overtime victory against the New York Jets in Week 14, Johnson contributed to the win with his first-career 100-yard performance, ending the day with 103 yards on 4 catches including a career-long 56-yard touchdown. For the season, Johnson was the Vikings third leading receiver with 31 catches, 475 yards and 2 touchdowns and was named and emerged as a starting receiver for the team replacing Cordarrelle Patterson, who was selected in the first round of the 2013 draft (187 selections before Johnson was).

==== 2015 season ====
Dealing with injuries for the most part of the preseason, Johnson failed to establish himself in the lineup as Mike Wallace earned the starting role in training camp. Johnson ended up starting 4 games while appearing in 11. In the Vikings eighth game of the season against the Chicago Bears, the game was tied 20–20 with just one minute remaining in the fourth quarter. On a 2nd-and-7 with 36 seconds remaining, Bridgewater threw an up-for-grabs pass in Johnson's direction and he hauled it in for a 35-yard gain (longest of the season) that set up the game-winning field goal by Blair Walsh. He was inactive for the final 3 games of the season including the Wild Card Playoff game.

==== 2016 season ====
Following Mike Wallace's departure in the offseason, Johnson was named the starting wide receiver opposite Stefon Diggs for the 2016 season. After three disappointing games to start the season in which he only managed to catch 3 passes for 20 yards, Johnson had a notable game against the New York Giants in Week 4, when he hauled in two passes for 70 yards, with a long of 40 yards.

=== Carolina Panthers ===
On March 10, 2017, Johnson signed a one-year contract with the Carolina Panthers. On July 25, Johnson was waived/injured by the Panthers and placed on injured reserve after having knee surgery.

=== New York Jets ===
On April 9, 2018, Johnson signed with the New York Jets. He was released by the Jets on August 31.

=== Orlando Apollos ===
In 2019, Johnson joined the Orlando Apollos of the Alliance of American Football.

On February 17, 2019, against the San Antonio Commanders, Johnson had a staggering 7 catches for 192 yards and 1 touchdown. Johnson holds the record for the most receiving yards in a game in AAF history. Johnson led the AAF in receiving the entire season, totaling 687 yards receiving and five touchdowns on 45 catches in eight games.

=== Philadelphia Eagles ===
After the AAF suspended football operations, Johnson signed a one-year contract with the Philadelphia Eagles on April 9, 2019. He was placed on injured reserve with an ankle injury on August 28. Johnson was released from injured reserve with an injury settlement on September 7.

=== The Spring League ===
Johnson joined the Alphas of The Spring League for its 2020 Fall season.

=== Statistics ===
Season	Team	Games		Receiving					Rushing					Fumbles	
Season	Team	GP	GS	Rec	Yds	Avg	Lng	TD	Att	Yds	Avg	Lng	TD	FUM	Lost
2013	Cleveland Browns	0	0	0	0	0.0	0	0	0	0	0.0	0	0	0	0
2014	Minnesota Vikings	12	6	31	475	15.3	56	2	1	-11	-11.0	0	0	1	0
2015	Minnesota Vikings	11	4	9	127	14.1	35	0	0	0	0.0	0	0	0	0
2016	Minnesota Vikings	12	6	20	232	11.6	40	0	0	0	0.0	0	0	0	0
Total		39	17	60	834	13.9	56	2	1	-11	-11.0	0	0	1	0
