= Jeoff Long =

American baseball player (1941–2026)

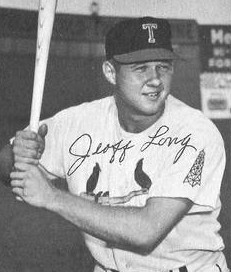
- Long in 1962
- Outfielder / First baseman
- Born: October 9, 1941; Covington, Kentucky, U.S.
- Died: September 25, 2026 (aged 84); Elsmere, Kentucky, U.S.
- Batted: Right Threw: Right

MLB debut
- July 31, 1963, for the St. Louis Cardinals

Last MLB appearance
- September 23, 1964, for the Chicago White Sox

MLB statistics
- Batting average: .193
- Home runs: 1
- Runs batted in: 9
- Stats at Baseball Reference

Teams
- St. Louis Cardinals (1963–1964); Chicago White Sox (1964)

Jeoffrey Keith Long (October 9, 1941 – September 25, 2026) was an American professional baseball player. Although he began his career as a pitcher, Long struggled on the mound during his first two minor league seasons and converted to first baseman in his third season to take advantage of his powerful bat. He reached Major League Baseball (MLB) at the age of 21, and spent part of the 1963 season and all of 1964 as a member of the St. Louis Cardinals and Chicago White Sox.

== Biography ==
Long threw and batted right-handed, stood 6 feet 1 inch (1.85 m) tall and weighed 200 pounds (91 kg). He signed with the Cardinals in 1959 after graduating from high school in Erlanger, Kentucky. As a pitcher in his first two years in the low minors, he compiled a record of two wins and 14 defeats in 45 games, but successfully changed positions in 1961 and the following year he swatted 30 home runs for the Tulsa Oilers of the Class AA Texas League.

The Cardinals recalled him in July 1963 and he made five appearances as a pinch hitter for them that season, garnering one hit. The following year, he served as a pinch hitter and substitute first baseman and right fielder for the 1964 Redbirds through the first week of July. He collected four hits, including a double and his only MLB homer, against the Milwaukee Braves during a weekend series in May, but was restricted to pinch hitting after May 29. The Cardinals then sold his contract to the White Sox on July 7 to make room for rookie Mike Shannon. Eight days later, Long, playing left field, slipped and hurt his knee on a wet field at Fenway Park. The injury affected his play in 1964 — he would start only two more times for the White Sox — and restricted him to only 46 minor league games played in 1965. In an attempt to rehabilitate the knee, Long lost three full seasons (1966–1968) and he retired after a brief 1969 minor league comeback attempt. All told, he appeared in 56 Major League games and collected 16 hits.

After leaving baseball, Long joined the family business, the Cincinnati Drum Service. He died in Elsmere, Kentucky, on September 25, 2026, at the age of 84.
