= Finley Ellingwood =

American physician

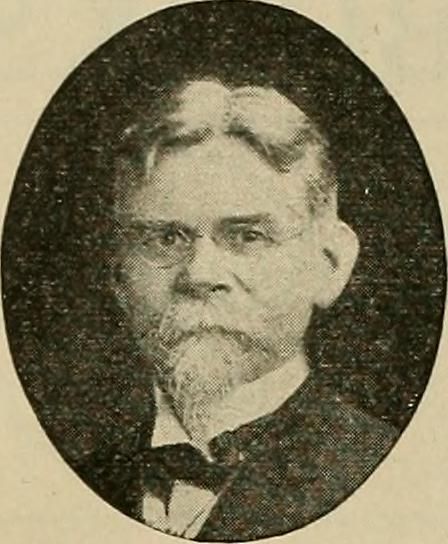
Finley Ellingwood (1909)

Finley Ellingwood (1852 – 1920) was an American doctor of eclectic medicine who was the author of the influential American Materia Medica, therapeutics, and pharmacognosy in 1919. Ellingwood was an active Chicago physician with many years experience, and an acknowledged expert in obstetrical/gynecological medicine. He was a vocal advocate of women physicians, and edited Ellingwood's Therapeutist for many years. His brand of Eclectic Medicine differed from the more subdued Cincinnati style as mentored by Scudder, Lloyd, Fyfe, and Felter.

The American Materia Medica, Therapeutics and Pharmacognosy is a serious medical text from the early 20th century, intended for practicing physicians and surgeons, which refers to difficult medical situations found in that period. There is an emphasis on physical diagnosis. The book is organized by organ system affected instead of by herbal name, so it will have headings such as "agents acting on the nervous system" or "agents acting on the heart". This type of listing is somewhat controversial as herbal medicines tend to work on more than one system. The book had been substantially lost until it was scanned by herbalist Michael Moore in pdf format. The book is also available in HTML format at Henriette Kress's website.

== Works ==
- American Materia medica, Therapeutics and Pharmacognosy : developing the latest acquired Knowledge of Drugs, and especially of the direct Action of single Drugs upon exact Conditions of Disease, with especial Reference to the Therapeu tics of the Plant Drugs of the Plant Drugs of the Americas. – Evanston [Ill.] : Ellinwood's Therapeutist, 1919. Digital edition by the University and State Library Düsseldorf
- A systematic Treatise on Materia medica and Therapeutics : with Reference to the most direct Action of Drugs. – Chicago : Chicago Medical Pr., 1902. Digital edition by the University and State Library Düsseldorf
- A Synopsis of Medical Chemistry. – Chicago Veterinary College., 1889.
