= King's American Dispensatory =

1854 book on herbs

King's American Dispensatory is a 19th century medical and botanical textbook. The book first published in 1854 that covers the uses of herbs used in American medical practice, especially by those involved in eclectic medicine, which was the botanical school of medicine in the 19th to 20th centuries. In 1880 John Uri Lloyd, an eclectic pharmacist of the late 19th and early 20th centuries, promised his friend, professor John King, to revise the pharmaceutical and chemical sections of the American Dispensatory. Eighteen years later an entirely rewritten eighteenth edition (third revision) was published in 1898. It was co-authored by eclectic physician Harvey Wickes Felter.
