= Billy Lyon =

American football player (born 1973)

No. 98, 96
- Positions: Defensive tackle, defensive end

Personal information
- Born: December 10, 1973 (age 52); Ashland, Kentucky, U.S.
- Listed height: 6 ft 5 in (1.96 m)
- Listed weight: 295 lb (134 kg)

Career information
- High school: Lloyd Memorial (Erlanger, Kentucky)
- College: Marshall (1992–1996)
- NFL draft: 1997: undrafted

Career history
- Kansas City Chiefs (1997)*; Green Bay Packers (1997–2002); Minnesota Vikings (2003)
- * Offseason or practice squad member only

Awards and highlights
- 2× NCAA I-AA national champion (1992, 1996)

Career NFL statistics
- Tackles: 75
- Sacks: 8
- Interceptions: 1
- Stats at Pro Football Reference

William Morton Lyon (born December 10, 1973) is an American former professional football player who was a defensive lineman for the Green Bay Packers and Minnesota Vikings of the National Football League (NFL). He played college football for the Marshall Thundering Herd. He signed with the Kansas City Chiefs after going undrafted in 1997 but was waived before the start of the regular season. Lyon later joined the Packers' practice squad in 1997 and played in 59 games for the team from 1998 to 2002. He also appeared in 13 games for the Minnesota Vikings in 2003.

== Early life ==
William Morton Lyon was born on December 10, 1973, in Ashland, Kentucky. He attended Lloyd Memorial High School in Erlanger, Kentucky.

== College career ==
Lyon played college football for the Marshall Thundering Herd from 1993 to 1996 and was a three-year starter. He was redshirted in 1992 as the team won the national championship. Lyon helped the Thundering Herd advance to the national championship game his junior year in 1995 by recording a career-high 13 tackles, including one safety, in the team's semifinal victory over McNeese State. He totaled 91 tackles and nine sacks his senior season in 1996 as the Thundering Herd went 15–0 and won the national championship.

Lyon was inducted into the Marshall Athletic Hall of Fame in 2007.

== Professional career ==
=== Kansas City Chiefs ===
After going undrafted in the 1997 NFL draft, Lyon signed with the Kansas City Chiefs on April 28, 1997. He was waived on August 15, 1997.

=== Green Bay Packers ===
Lyon was signed to the practice squad of the Green Bay Packers on November 20, 1997. He re-signed with the team on January 28, 1998. He appeared in four games in 1998, recording four solo tackles, two assisted tackles, and one sack. Lyon also appeared in one playoff game that year but recorded no statistics.

Lyon appeared in all 16 games, starting four, for the Packers in 1999, accumulating 12 solo tackles, seven assisted tackles, two sacks, one interception, and two pass breakups. He played in 11 games, starting one, during the 2000 season, recording seven solo tackles, four assisted tackles, and one sack.

He played in 12 games in 2001, totaling 13 solo tackles, six assisted tackles, two sacks, one forced fumble, and one pass breakup. He also appeared in two playoff games that season and made three solo tackles.

Lyon played in 16 games, starting two, during his final season for the Packers in 2002, recording 11 solo tackles, four assisted tackles, and two sacks. He became a free agent after the 2002 season.

Overall, he appeared in 59 regular season games, starting seven, for the Packers, and made 70 combined tackles and eight sacks.

=== Minnesota Vikings ===
Lyon signed with the Minnesota Vikings on March 5, 2003. He appeared in 13 games for the Vikings during the 2003, accumulating four solo tackles and one assisted tackle. He was released on August 31, 2004.
