= William Morgan (anti-Mason) =

American activist (1774 – disappeared 14th September 1826)

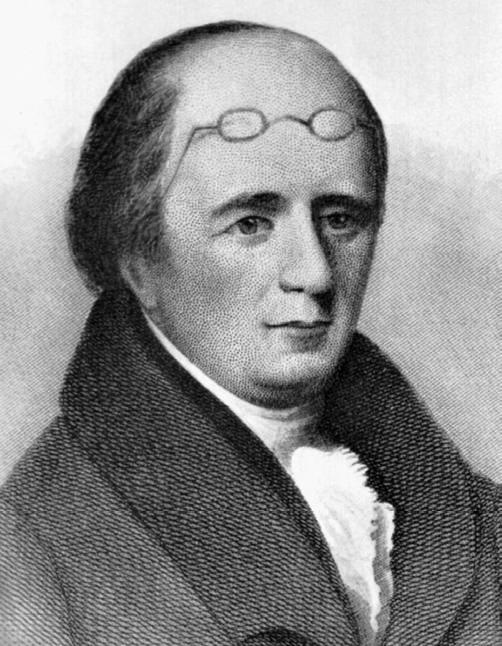
- 1829 illustration of Morgan by The Grand Lodge of British Columbia and Yukon
- Born: 1774; Culpeper, Colony of Virginia
- Disappeared: c. 14th September 1826 (aged 51–52); Near Youngstown, New York
- Died: Unknown
- Occupations: Stone cutter Bricklayer; Storekeeper; Author
- Known for: Anti-Masonic writings
- Spouse: Lucinda Pendleton (m. 1819)
- Children: 2

William Morgan (1774 – disappeared 14th September 1826) was a resident of Batavia, New York, whose disappearance and presumed murder in 1826 ignited a powerful movement against the Freemasons, a fraternal society that had become influential in the United States. After Morgan announced his intention to publish a book exposing Freemasonry's secrets, he was arrested on trumped-up charges. He disappeared soon after and was believed to have been kidnapped and killed by Masons from western New York.

The allegations surrounding Morgan's disappearance and presumed death sparked a public outcry and inspired Thurlow Weed and others to harness the discontent by founding the new Anti-Masonic Party in opposition to President Andrew Jackson's Democrats. It ran a presidential candidate in 1832 but was nearly defunct by 1835.

== Early life and education ==
Morgan was born in Culpeper, Virginia, in 1774. His birth date is sometimes given as August 7, but no definite source for this is cited. He worked as a bricklayer and stone cutter and later used his savings to open a store in Richmond.

== Military service ==
Morgan told friends and acquaintances that he had served with distinction as a captain during the War of 1812, and his associates in upstate New York appear to have accepted this claim. Several men named William Morgan appear in the Virginia militia rolls for this period, but none held the rank of captain, and whether Morgan actually served in the war has not been determined with certainty.

== Marriage and family ==
In October 1819, when he was in his mid-40s, Morgan married 19-year-old Lucinda Pendleton in Richmond, Virginia. They had two children: Lucinda Wesley Morgan and Thomas Jefferson Morgan. Two years after his marriage, Morgan moved his family to York, Upper Canada, where he operated a brewery. When his business was destroyed in a fire, Morgan was reduced to poverty.

He returned with his family to the United States, settling first at Rochester, New York, and later in Batavia, where he again worked as a bricklayer and stonecutter. Nineteenth-century local histories described Morgan as a heavy drinker and a gambler, characterizations disputed by Morgan's friends and supporters.

== Book on Freemasonry ==
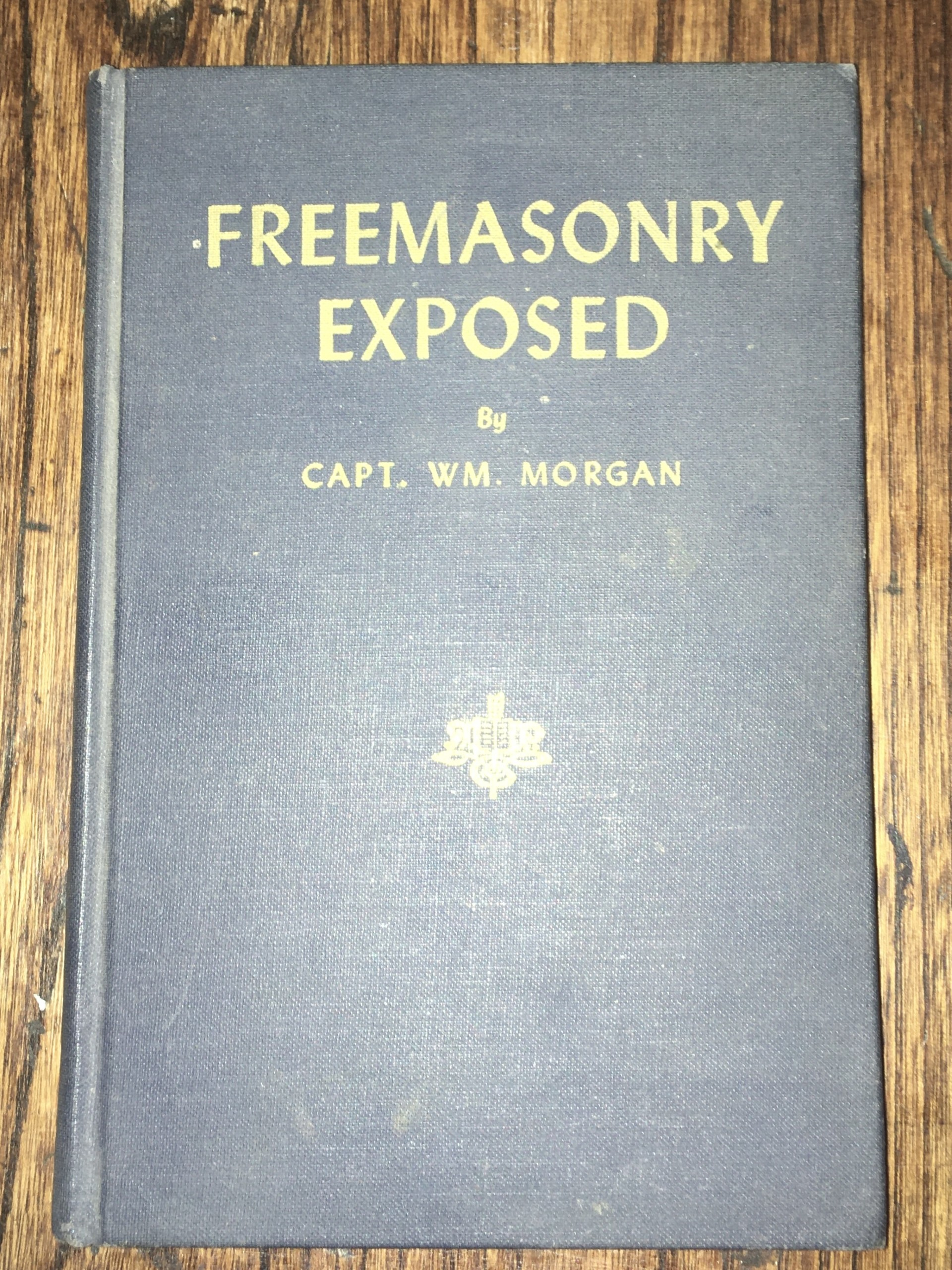

Morgan claimed to have been made a Master Mason while he was living in Canada, and he appears to have briefly attended a lodge in Rochester. In 1825, Morgan received the Royal Arch degree at Le Roy's Western Star Chapter Number 33, having declared under oath that he had previously received the six degrees that preceded it. It has never been established if he actually received these degrees and, if so, from which lodge. Morgan then attempted unsuccessfully to help establish or visit lodges and chapters in Batavia, but he was denied participation by members who disapproved of his character and even questioned his claims to Masonic membership. Morgan finally announced that he was going to publish an exposé titled Illustrations of Masonry, critical of the Freemasons and revealing their secret degree ceremonies in detail.

Morgan declared that a local newspaper publisher, David Cade Miller, had given him a sizable advance for the work. Miller is said to have received the entered apprentice degree (the first degree of Freemasonry), but had been stopped from advancement by the objection of Batavia lodge members. Morgan was promised one-fourth of the profits, and the financial backers of the venture—Miller, John Davids (Morgan's landlord), and Russel Dyer—entered into a $500,000 penal bond with Morgan to guarantee its publication.

== Disappearance ==
Since Masons place their hands on a Bible and promise not to reveal the passwords and grips of the degrees, several members of the Batavia lodge published an advertisement denouncing Morgan for breaking his word by authoring the book. An attempt was also made to set fire to Miller's newspaper office and print shop. On September 11, 1826, Morgan was arrested for supposed nonpayment of a loan and allegedly stealing a shirt and a tie; according to the laws of the time he could be held in debtors' prison until restitution was made, which would have made it more difficult to publish his book. Morgan was jailed in Canandaigua, and when Miller learned of this, he went to the jail to pay the debt and secure Morgan's release. Morgan was released, but then re-arrested and charged with supposedly failing to pay a two dollar tavern bill. While the jailer was away, a group of men convinced his wife to release Morgan; they walked to a waiting carriage on the night of the 12th of September, which arrived two days later at Fort Niagara. Shortly afterwards, Morgan disappeared.

There are conflicting accounts of what happened next. The generally accepted version of events is that Morgan was taken in a boat to the middle of the Niagara River and thrown overboard, where he presumably drowned, since he was never seen again in the community. In 1848, Henry L. Valance allegedly confessed on his deathbed to taking part in Morgan's murder, a purported event recounted in chapter two of Reverend C. G. Finney's anti-Masonic book The Character, Claims, and Practical Workings of Freemasonry (1869).

In October 1827, a badly decomposed body washed up on the shores of Lake Ontario. Many presumed it to be Morgan, and the body was buried as his. However, the wife of a missing Canadian named Timothy Monroe positively identified the clothing on the body as that which had been worn by her husband at the time he had disappeared. One group of Freemasons denied that Morgan was killed, alleging that they had paid him $500 to leave the country. Morgan was reportedly seen later, including in other countries, but none of the reports were confirmed. Eventually, Eli Bruce, the sheriff of Niagara County and a Mason, was removed from office and tried for his involvement in Morgan's disappearance; he served 28 months in prison after being convicted of conspiracy for his role in kidnapping Morgan and holding him against his will before his disappearance. Three other Masons, Loton Lawson, Nicholas Chesebro, and Edward Sawyer, were convicted of taking part in the kidnapping and served sentences. Other Batavia Masons were tried and acquitted. Author Jasper Ridley suggests that Morgan was probably killed by local Masons, as all other scenarios are highly improbable. Historian H. Paul Jeffers also considers this the more credible explanation. C. T. Congdon, in Reminiscences of a Journalist, cites a third-hand account "that Morgan was murdered by certain very zealous Freemasons," and notes that the resultant anti-Mason sentiment caused many elections to go to non-Masons for a number of years afterwards.

== Aftermath: the anti-Masonic movement ==
Soon after Morgan disappeared, Miller published Morgan's book, which became a bestseller because of the notoriety of the events surrounding his disappearance. Miller did not say that Morgan had been murdered but that he had been "carried away". Unverified rumors speculated that Morgan had assumed a new identity and settled in Albany, Canada, or the Cayman Islands, where he was supposed to have been hanged as a pirate. New York governor DeWitt Clinton, also a Mason, offered a $1,000 reward (equivalent to $28,500 in 2025) for information about Morgan's whereabouts, but it was never claimed.

The circumstances of Morgan's disappearance and the minimal punishment received by his kidnappers caused public outrage, and he became a symbol of the rights of free speech and free press. Protests against Freemasons took place in New York and the neighboring states; Masonic officials disavowed the actions of the kidnappers, but all Masons were under a cloud of suspicion. Thurlow Weed, a New York politician, gathered discontented opponents of President Andrew Jackson, a Mason, into the Anti-Masonic Party, which gained the support of such notable politicians as William H. Seward and Millard Fillmore.

In the 1828 campaign, other Jackson rivals, including John Quincy Adams, joined in denouncing the Masons. In 1832, the Anti-Masonic Party fielded William Wirt as its presidential candidate and Amos Ellmaker as his running mate, and they received Vermont's seven electoral votes, marking the first time in US history when the third party presidential ticket carried a state by popular vote - a feat that would not be repeated until 1856. By 1835, the party had become moribund everywhere but Pennsylvania, as other issues, such as slavery, became the focus of national attention. In 1847, Adams published a widely distributed book titled Letters on the Masonic Institution that criticized the Masons' secret society.

Members of Freemasonry criticized the Mormons for their adoption of Masonic rituals and regalia. In 1830, Morgan's widow, Lucinda Pendleton Morgan, married George W. Harris of Batavia, a silversmith who was 20 years older. After they moved to the Midwest, they became Mormons. By 1837, some historians believe that Lucinda Pendleton Morgan Harris had become one of the plural wives of Joseph Smith, founder of the Latter Day Saint movement. She continued to live with George Harris. After Smith was murdered in 1844, she was "sealed" to him for eternity in a rite of the church. By 1850, the Harrises had separated. When George Harris died in 1860, he had been excommunicated from the Mormons after ceasing to practice with them. That year, Lucinda Morgan Harris was reported to have joined the Catholic Sisters of Charity in Memphis, Tennessee, where she worked at the Leah Asylum. She had been widowed three times. In 1841, the Mormons announced their vicarious baptism of William Morgan after his death, as one of the first under their new rite to posthumously offer people entrance into the Church of Jesus Christ of Latter Day Saints.

In June, 1881, a grave was discovered in a quarry two miles south of the Indian reservation in Pembroke, New York. In it were bones and a metal tobacco box. Other items found included a ring with the inscribed initials "W. M." The box contained a crumpled paper; its few legible words seemed to suggest that the remains might have been Morgan's. There were also critics who suggested that the alleged discovery of the bones and other artifacts was intentionally timed to coincide with the effort to construct a memorial to Morgan and might have been an effort to generate publicity for the monument, which was in fact dedicated in 1882.

== Monument to Morgan ==
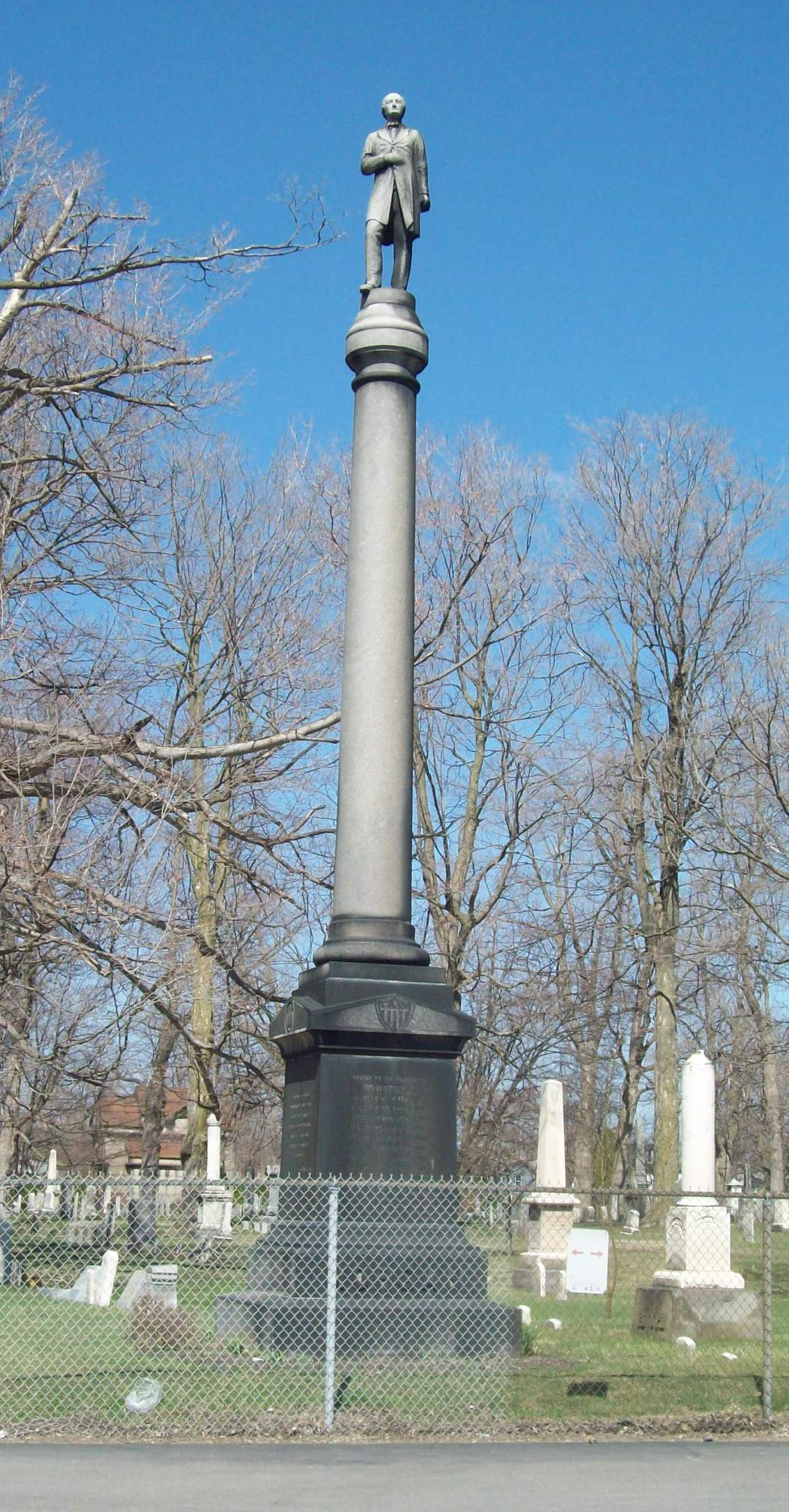
William Morgan Pillar, April 2011

On September 13, 1882, the National Christian Association, a group opposed to secret societies, commissioned and erected a statue in memoriam to Morgan in the Batavia Cemetery, in Batavia, New York, where Timothy Monroe's body had been buried. The ceremony was witnessed by 1,000 people, including representatives from local Masonic lodges.

The monument reads:

Sacred to the memory of Wm. Morgan, a native of Virginia, a Capt. in the War of 1812, a respectable citizen of Batavia, and a martyr to the freedom of writing, printing and speaking the truth. He was abducted from near this spot in the year 1826, by Freemasons and murdered for revealing the secrets of their order. The court records of Genesee County and the files of the Batavia Advocate, kept in the Recorders office contain the history of the events that caused the erection of this monument.

== Representation in other media ==
The pharmacist John Uri Lloyd based part of the background story of his popular scientific allegorical novel Etidorhpa (1895) on the kidnapping of William Morgan and the start of the Anti-Masonry movement.

In his novel The Craft: Freemasons, Secret Agents, and William Morgan (2010), the author Thomas Talbot presents a fictional version of the William Morgan kidnapping. He portrays him as a British spy, includes rogue British Masons, and has presidential agents thwart an assassination plot.

He is also featured in Timothy Liu's poem "Secret Combinations" from his 2005 book of poems, For Dust Thou Art.

== Works ==
- Morgan, William (1827). Illustrations of Masonry, By One of the Fraternity Who has Devoted Thirty Years to the Subject. Rochester, NY: Wm. Morgan – via Google Books.
- Morgan, William; Crafts, George R. (1851). The Mysteries of Free Masonry. New York: Wilson and Company – via HathiTrust.

== See also ==
- Anti-Masonry
- List of people who disappeared mysteriously (pre-1910)
