= John Uri Lloyd =

American pharmacist (1849–1936)

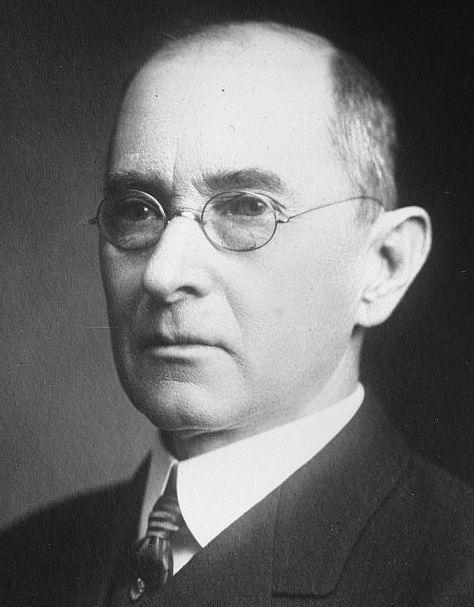
- Born: April 19, 1849; West Bloomfield, New York, U.S.
- Died: April 9, 1936 (aged 86); Van Nuys, California, U.S.
- Resting place: Florence, Kentucky, U.S.
- Relatives: Curtis Gates Lloyd (brother)
- Scientific career
- Fields: Pharmacognosy; ethnobotany; economic botany; herbalism

John Uri Lloyd (April 19, 1849 in West Bloomfield, New York – April 9, 1936) was an American pharmacist and leader of the eclectic medicine movement who was influential in the development of pharmacognosy, ethnobotany, economic botany, and herbalism.

He also wrote novels set in northern Kentucky. His most popular novel was the science fiction or allegorical Etidorhpa, or, the end of the earth: the strange history of a mysterious being and the account of a remarkable journey (1895), illustrated by J. Augustus Knapp. First distributed privately, it was later printed in eighteen editions. Translated into seven languages, it was widely read in Europe as well as the United States.

== Life and career ==
John Uri Lloyd was born in upstate New York to teachers Sophia Webster and Nelson Marvin Lloyd. His family relocated to Florence and Petersburg in northern Kentucky, near Cincinnati, Ohio, in 1853. Lloyd took an apprenticeship with the chemist William J.M. Gordon when he was 14 years old and later apprenticed with George Eger.

His younger brothers Nelson Ashley Lloyd (1851–1926) and Curtis Gates Lloyd (1859–1926) also became chemists. During 1886 the brothers bought the Merrell and Thorpe Company, renaming it Lloyd Brothers, Pharmacists, Inc. John Lloyd's innovations include a "cold still" for plant extractions and the first buffered alkaloid (made with hydrous aluminium silicate), called alcresta.

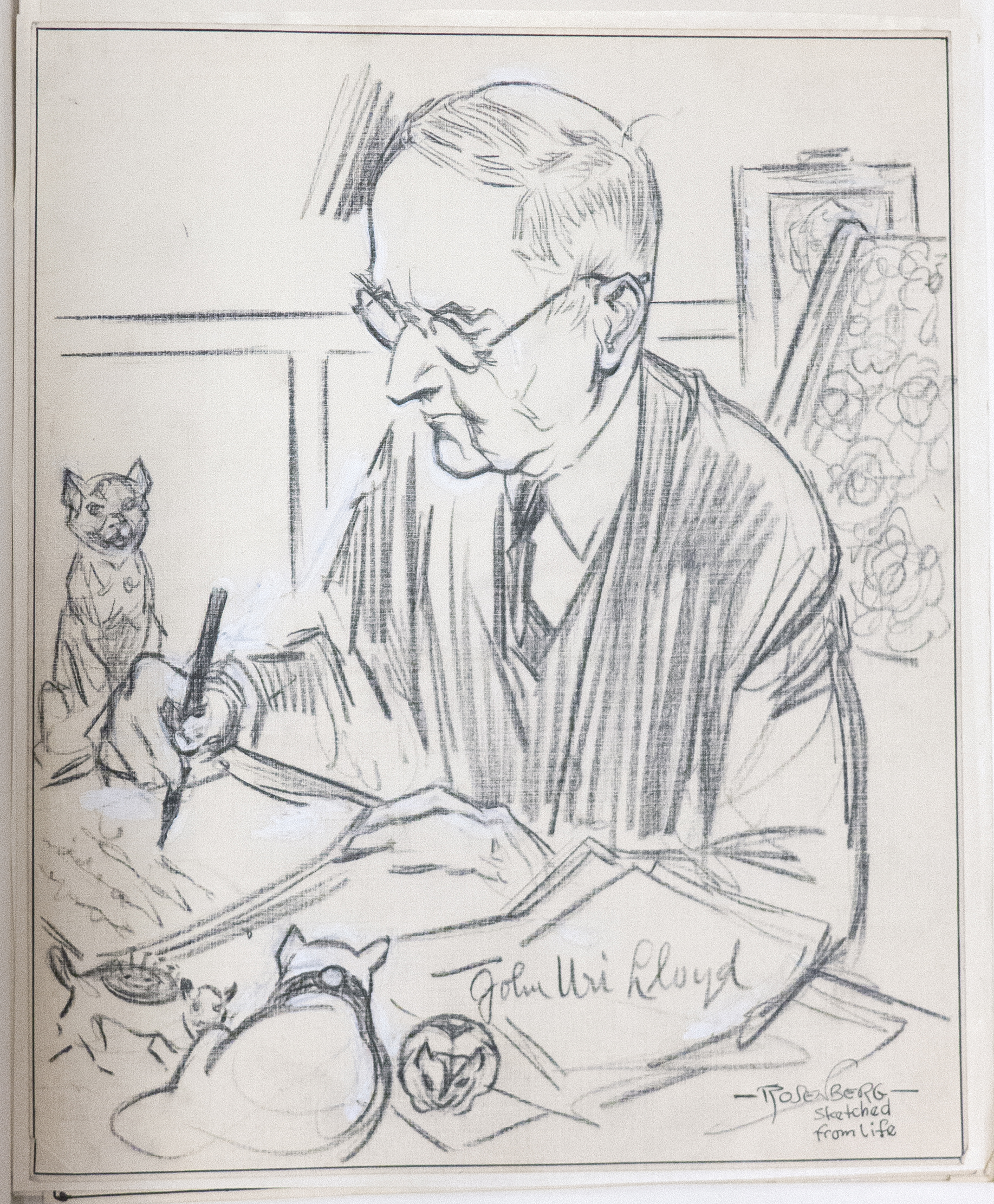
drawing of John Uri Lloyd by Manuel Rosenberg

In 1919, Lloyd and his two brothers established trusts to fund the Lloyd Library and Museum. Today it is considered by many to house the finest collections in the world devoted to eclectic medicine, medical botany and pharmacy. During the 19th and early 20th centuries, the eclectic medicine movement was popular, which incorporated the use of medical botany. The movement led to the founding of associated medical schools, including the Eclectic Medical Institute, first located in Worthington in 1833, which later moved to Cincinnati where it had students from 1845 to 1939.

Lloyd died on April 9, 1936, at the home of his daughter in Van Nuys, California. He was buried in Florence, Kentucky.

After Lloyd's death, S.B. Penick bought the Lloyd Brothers firm in 1938. In 1960, the German pharmaceutical manufacturer Hoechst AG purchased the operations. In 2013, the American company Eli Lilly and Company bought Hoechst AG.

== Writings ==
Lloyd combined his interests by writing a series of local description novels about the northern Kentucky area. His most popular and influential work was Etidorhpa (1895), a scientific allegory that some consider a work of science fiction. It was part of what are called the genre of "Hollow Earth" novels, based on a journey to the interior of the earth and another world. He first distributed the book privately. When it was printed commercially, illustrations by J. Augustus Knapp were added. It ran to eighteen editions and was translated into seven languages.

== Legacy and honors ==
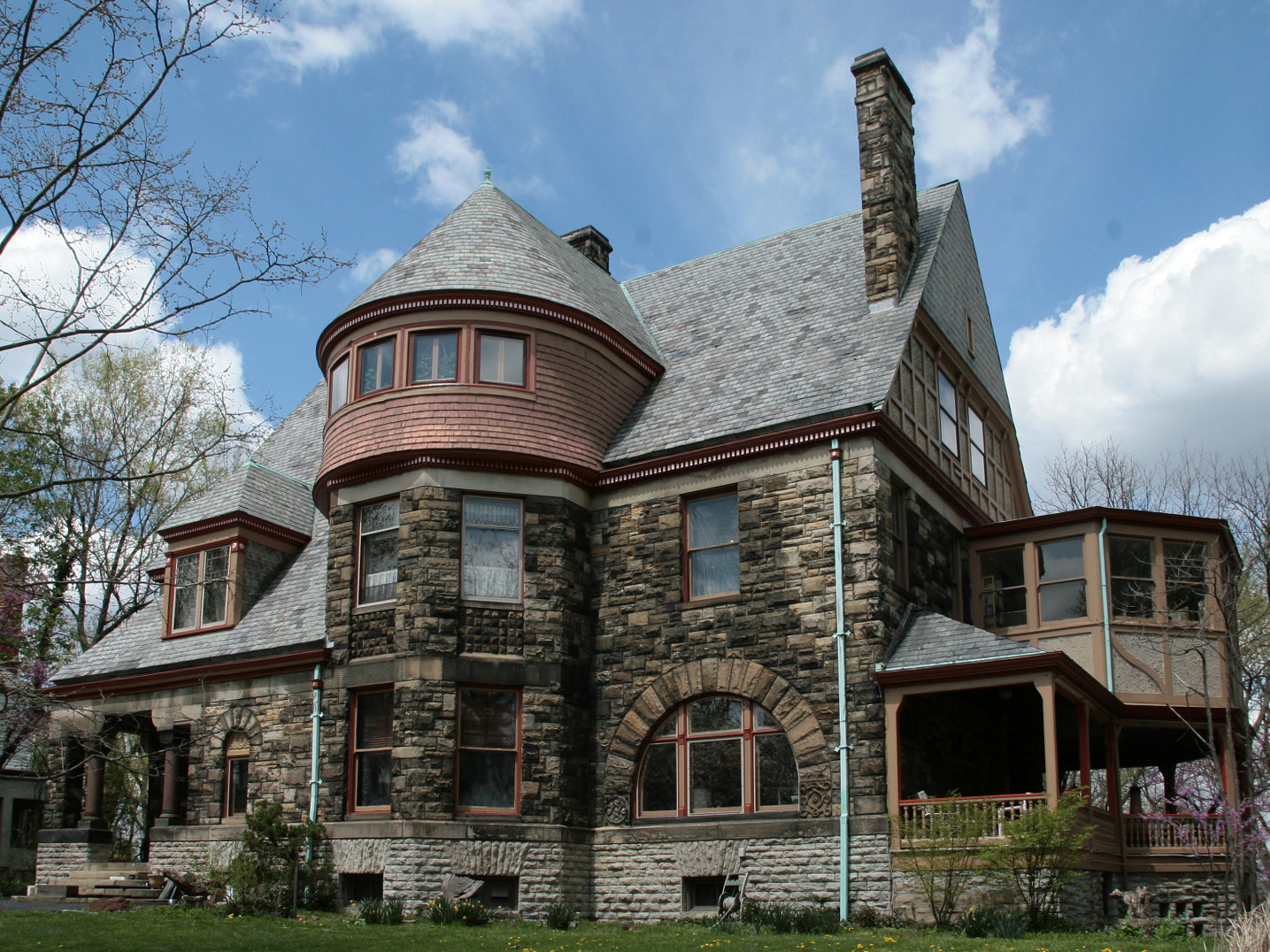
John Uri Lloyd House

- The John Uri Lloyd House in Cincinnati was added to the National Register of Historic Places in 1973.
- The Lloyd Library and Museum, Cincinnati.
- Lloyd Memorial High School in Erlanger, Kentucky

== Bibliography ==
Pharmaceutical:

- Elixirs And Flavoring Extracts: Their History, Formulae, & Methods of Preparation (1892)
- Life and Medical Discoveries of Samuel Thomson, and a History of the Thomsonian Materia Medica, as shown in "The New Guide to Health", and the Literature of that Day, Cincinnati: Lloyd Library, 1909. Digital edition by the University and State Library Düsseldorf
- The Eclectic Alkaloids, Resins, Resinoids, Oleo-Resins and Concentrated Principles (1910)
- History of the Vegetable Drugs of the Pharmacopeia of the United States, Cincinnati, Ohio: Lloyd Library, 1911. Digital edition by the University and State Library Düsseldorf
- A Lesson In Mind Study (19xx, repr. 2006)

Other works:

- Etidorhpa, illustrated by J. Augustus Knapp (1895; rpt. 1997 ISBN 1-56459-243-X)
- The Right Side of the Car: A Story of the Northern Pacific Railway (1897)
- Scroggins (1900, repr. 2007)
- Stringtown on the Pike: A Tale of Northernmost Kentucky (1901, repr. 2009)
- Warwick of the Knobs: A Story of Stringtown County, Kentucky (1901)
- Red Head: Illustrations and Decorations by Reginald B. Birch (1903, repr. 2007)
- Hydrastis canadensis : facsimile, reprint and illustrations of the article in "Drugs and medicines of North America". Lloyd Library, Cincinnati 1908. Digital edition by the University and State Library Düsseldorf
- Felix Moses: the Beloved Jew of Stringtown on the Pike (1930)

== See also ==
- Herbalism
- Pharmacognosy
- Pharmacology
- Eclectic medicine
- Harvey Wickes Felter
- Michael Moore (herbalist)
- Lloyd Library and Museum
- King's American Dispensatory
