= List of killings by law enforcement officers in the United States, August 2015 =

This is a list of people reported killed by non-military law enforcement officers in the United States in August 2015, whether in the line of duty or not, and regardless of reason or method. The listing documents the occurrence of a death, making no implications regarding wrongdoing or justification on the part of the person killed or officer involved. Killings are arranged by date of the incident that caused death. Different death dates, if known, are noted in the description. The table below lists 49 people.

== August 2015 ==
| Date | Name (Age) of Deceased | State (City) | Description |
|---|---|---|---|
| 2015-08-31 | Dyksma, Nicholas (18) | Georgia (Harris County) | Police pursued Dyksma onto the highway after receiving a report about a suspicious person at a Circle K store. After deflating Dyksma's tires, officers tasered him and held him down, where he fell unconscious. CPR was not attempted until ten minutes later when the ambulance arrived, but at that point Dyksma had no pulse and had stopped breathing. |
| 2015-08-30 | Rippley, William (45) | Colorado (Loveland) | Police arrived at Pizza Ranch, 3451 Mountain Lion Drive for a report of a man throwing his bicycle into traffic in the 3400 block of Eisenhower Boulevard. William Ripley, 45 of Loveland, ran inside the Pizza Ranch on Mountain Lion Drive and held a patron hostage. Loveland police officer, Jennifer Hines, shot and killed Rippley inside the restaurant. She was cleared of charges in September 2015. |
| 2015-08-28 | Flores, Gilbert (41) | Texas (San Antonio) | Police arrived to Flores' home, where he was involved in a domestic disturbance with his wife and child, which led to his wife being slashed. Flores had his hands in the air when he was shot by police. In one video, Flores appears to be unarmed, although police stated in another video he had a knife in one hand while his hands were raised. |
| 2015-08-28 | Hober, Robert Arthur (54) | California (San Diego) | San Diego Police officers were called to a CVS Pharmacy by reports of a man was threatening employees with a boxcutter. When the officer arrived he encountered the man, still holding the boxcutter, outside the store, and told him to put the boxcutter down. The man ignored the orders and advanced toward the officer who retreated behind his car. The suspect continued to advance and the officer fired several shots, killing Robert Arthur Hober. |
| 2015-08-27 | Alehegne. Yonas (30) | California (Oakland) | Oakland Police officer Jennifer Farrell was responding to a reported assault in a parking garage. She was leaving the garage when Alehenge stepped in front of her patrol car. When she got out of her car Alhenge attacked her with a chain, striking her head and face several times. She shot and killed Alhenge. It was later confirmed that Alhenge was a suspect in the original assault reported. |
| 2015-08-27 | Soriano, Manuel (29) | California (Los Angeles) | Los Angeles Police officers were called to a reported dispute between neighbors. They arrived about 11:40 p.m. and when they found and questioned the suspect he armed himself with a "hard object" and struck one or more officers. The officers fired their pistols and killed the man who was later identified as Manuel Soriano, homeless. |
| 2015-08-26 | Tyree, Michael (31) | California (San Jose) | Tyree was beaten to death with batons by three guards at the Santa Clara County Jail. The guards were convicted of second-degree murder. They successfully appealed their conviction, but were charged with manslaughter, and were once more convicted in 2024. |
| 2015-08-22 | Alderman, Jason Lee (29) | California (Bakersfield) | Two Bakersfield Police officers were in the parking lot of a Subway restaurant when they observed the subject inside the restaurant and it appeared he was committing a robbery. One of the officers shot Alderman. He died later at a local hospital. Senior Officer Chad Garrett was cleared of any wrongdoing in the shooting by the Bakersfield Police Department and the Kern County District Attorney. |
| 2015-08-21 | Rushton, Alan (38) | North Carolina (Wake Forest) | Rushton was shot by police who responded to a domestic disturbance at his home. According to officers, he was charging at officers with a kitchen knife. |
| 2015-08-21 | Hall, Charles (30) | Maryland (North East) | Hall was shot in the torso during an altercation with a police trooper near a Wal-Mart store. There was allegedly an arrest warrant for Hall. |
| 2015-08-20 | Allen, Wade | North Carolina (Waynesville) | Shot during an exchange of gunfire with police at a church. |
| 2015-08-20 | Herrera, Raul III (17) | California (Ontario) | The boy allegedly robbed a fast food restaurant and fled on a skateboard. He brandished a handgun at officers who responded to the scene. He left a suicide note. |
| 2015-08-20 | Tavis, Jeffory (50) | Alabama (Tuscaloosa) | A man allegedly tried to assault an officer, who responded by shooting him. |
| 2015-08-19 | Ball-Bey, Mansur (18) | Missouri (St. Louis) | Ball-Bey was shot in the back by police, who alleged he was aiming a gun at them. |
| 2015-08-17 | Jacquez, Richard | California (San Jose) | Jacquez Richard, suspect in a homicide, was pursued by San Jose Police. When he ran toward a home police shot and killed him. |
| 2015-08-16 | unnamed | Texas (Kerrville) | Police responded to a domestic disturbance, and a man armed with a rifle stepped out to his porch and allegedly brandished it at officers. At least one officer fired. |
| 2015-08-16 | unnamed | California (San Jose) | A homicide suspect was shot by police after he allegedly brandished a handgun at them. |
| 2015-08-16 | Castillo, Matthew (29) | California (San Jose) | San Jose Police Officers investigating an August 13 homicide encountered Castillo at a strip mall. When the officers attempted to take Matthew Castillo into custody he allegedly reached for his handgun. The two officer shot and killed him. |
| 2015-08-15 | Baker, Allen Matthew, III (23) | California (Sunnyvale) | Two men ran away from police near a motel. One man, Allen Baker, was shot by police. Baker, a San Diego resident, ran away from a hotel where prostitution activity was reported, and was spotted near the hotel armed with a handgun. Police said that they demanded Baker to drop his weapon, and then shot him. |
| 2015-08-15 | Unsworth, John | Indiana (Hansworth) | Shot by police four times after charging at an officer. He was Tasered prior to being shot. |
| 2015-08-15 | Ruiz, Oscar (44) | California (Irwindale) | Baldwin Park Police officers responded to a call of a man acting strangely and lying on the sidewalk. When officers arrived at the location, witnesses directed the officers across the street (into the City of Irwindale) where others told officers the man had stolen a flag and flagpole and was waving it at traffic. The police then saw Ruiz with the flagpole and pursued him. An officer tased him and after a struggle he was held down and handcuffed. He became unresponsive so the officers removed the handcuffs and performed CPR. Oscar Ruiz was pronounced dead at a local hospital. |
| 2015-08-15 | Ashley, Benjamin Peter (34) | California (Inyokern) | Ashley was being sought by law enforcement officers on a murder warrant. Kern County Sheriffs deputies, responding to a tip, found him at a mini-mart in Inyokern. When they confronted Ashley, he drew a weapon from his waistband. Both deputies drew their weapons and fired, killing Ashley. |
| 2015-08-14 | Manley, Asshams | Maryland (Prince George's County) | shot during struggle with an officer's gun. |
| 2015-08-14 | Tyree, Garland | New York (New York) | Garland exchanged gunfire with police from his Staten Island house. He also shot and wounded a firefighter. |
| 2015-08-14 | unnamed | Texas (Boerne) | Shot after allegedly brandishing a gun. |
| 2015-08-13 | Anderson, Christopher (53) | Connecticut (Manchester) | A bank robbery suspect was shot dead by police during a high-speed chase. Anderson crashed his car, and walked out of the car with a handgun in his hand, and officers fired. Anderson died from his injuries at a Hartford hospital on August 16. |
| 2015-08-13 | Smith, William | New Mexico (Hobbs) | shot by police while a passenger in a car. |
| 2015-08-12 | Hughs-Lance, Randal | Texas (Waco) | Shoplifting suspect shot by police after wielding a knife. |
| 2015-08-12 | Jones, Redel Kentel (30) | California (Los Angeles) | Woman allegedly advanced towards officers with a knife, after a robbery was reported in Baldwin Hills. |
| 2015-08-12 | Wilks, Nathaniel | California (Oakland) | An armed robbery suspect was shot by three police officers near downtown. The suspect was attempting a carjacking, and was holding a pistol when confronted by police. |
| 2015-08-12 | Vallejo, Anthony Lorenzo (27) | California (Hemet) | Wanted on a parole violation, Vallejo was being sought by Riverside County Sheriff's Deputies. Deputies had tried to pull over Vallejo's vehicle but he sped away until he crashed. He emerged from his pickup and pointed a gun at the deputies, who shot and killed him. |
| 2015-08-12 | Marshall, Reginald | Ohio (Toledo) | |
| 2015-08-11 | Alacorn, Casey (34) | Idaho (Sandpoint) | A man was shot and killed in a confrontation with police in a house. |
| 2015-08-10 | Green, Andre (15) | Indiana (Indianapolis) | Green was shot by police during a carjacking. |
| 2015-08-09 | Quinn, Patrick (77) | Pennsylvania (Pittston) | shot by police in apartment complex. |
| 2015-08-09 | Rivera, Edrian (22) | California (San Jose) | A man stabbed and seriously wounded a man, and the suspect was found a mile away from the scene in a tract housing complex. Officers tried to confront the suspect, who tried to run away but eventually raised his arm with the knife towards officers while shouting obscenities. At least one officer opened fire on the man, who later died in a hospital from his injuries. |
| 2015-08-08 | McDaniel, Kevin (49) | Washington (Spokane) | McDaniel, an auto parts theft suspect, was shot by police during an exchange of gunfire. |
| 2015-08-08 | Palmer, Shamir (24) | South Carolina (Summerville) | Shot by police after raising a gun. |
| 2015-08-08 | Keckhaser, Mark (53) | Montana (Superior) | Keckhaser allegedly swerved his vehicle towards a deputy's car, and was shot by him. |
| 2015-08-08 | Wilkes, Jeffrey Clyde | North Carolina (Gastonia) | Accused of shooting a neighbor to death, killed by officers in a shootout. |
| 2015-08-07 | Marchese, Aaron Allen (30) | California (Fresno) | Fresno Police officers responded to a report of a man armed with a shotgun, found Marchese, who matched the description. When officers ordered him to show his hands, he pulled an object from his waistband. An officer fired and hit Marchese who died a short time later. The "weapon" was a fake. |
| 2015-08-06 | Ponce, Gustavo | Kentucky (Elsmere) | A suspect in the fatal stabbing of a person in his home was shot by police. |
| 2015-08-05 | Montano, Vincente David (29) | Tennessee (Antioch) | 29-year-old homeless man Vincente Montano attacked three people in a movie theater with an axe and pepper spray while carrying a gun. He was shot and killed by a SWAT team 41 minutes after the attack began. Montano had a history of mental illness. |
| 2015-08-05 | Hargrove, Kesawhn Dominique (20) | Virginia (Richmond) | 20-year old convicted felon Keshawn Hargrove was killed in a shootout with the police after a 911 call about a man with a gun. One police officer was injured in the exchange of gunfire. Hargrove had recently been released from jail for unlawful possession of a firearm as a felon. He had previously shot his girlfriend in the leg when he was 15. |
| 2015-08-07 | Taylor, Christian (19) | Texas (Arlington) | 19-year-old college football player Christian Taylor broke the front windshield of a car, then drove a vehicle through the glass doors of a car dealership at 1:00 AM (CST), setting off the burglar alarm. In the course of being apprehended, Taylor was shot dead by a police officer. |
| 2015-08-05 | Hodge, Raymond | Hawaii (Maui) | Hodge was shot by police at a park, after reports of suspicious behavior. |
| 2015-08-05 | Galvaiz, Jason (40) | Washington (Tacoma) | Galvaiz, a robbery suspect, was shot by an off-duty officer. |
| 2015-08-03 | Malave, Joseph (18) | Pennsylvania (Campbelltown) | Malave burglarized a gun store and was shot by police during an altercation. |
| 2015-08-03 | Clements, Antonio (49) | California (Oakland) | Clements, a sexual assault suspect, fired at police with an assault rifle, on Martin Luther King, Jr. Way. A sergeant was wounded in the shootout. |

== See also ==
- Death in custody § United States
- Henry A. Wallace Police Crime Public Database
- List of cases of police brutality
- List of countries with annual rates and counts for killings by law enforcement officers
- List of law enforcement officers killed in the line of duty in the United States
- List of law enforcement officers convicted for an on-duty killing in the United States
- List of shootings by US immigration agents
- List of police reforms related to the George Floyd protests
- List of unarmed African Americans killed by law enforcement officers in the United States
- Lists of killings by law enforcement officers
- Police brutality in the United States
- Police misconduct § United States
- Police riot § United States
- Police use of deadly force in the United States
