= John Augustus Knapp =

American artist (1853–1938)

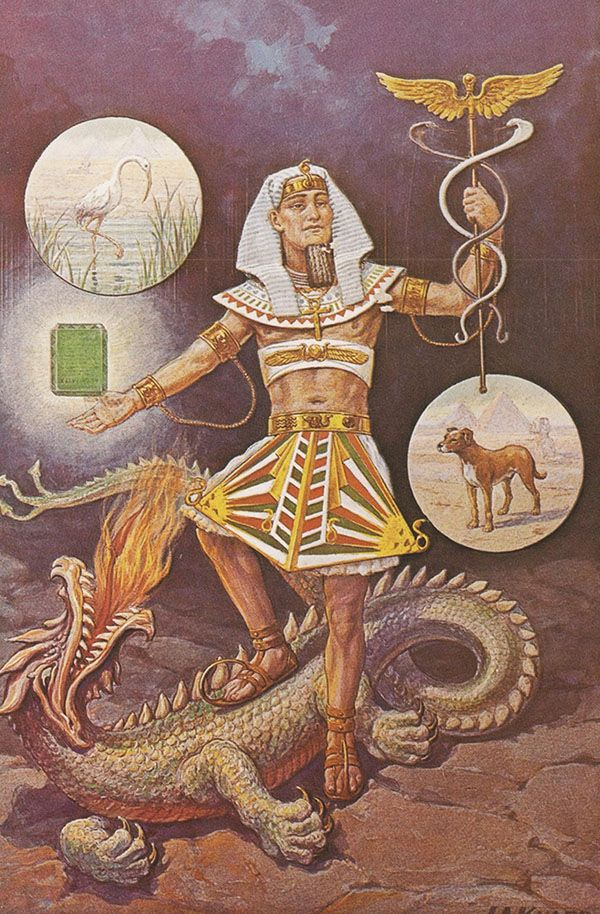
Hermes Trismegistus by J.A.Knapp

J. Augustus Knapp (25 December 1853 – 10 March 1938) was an American artist best known for his esoteric paintings featured in Manly Palmer Hall's The Secret Teachings of All Ages. John Augustus was the son of John Knapp and Margaret Wente, and brother to a sister, Annie, and a half-sister Louisa. He was born in Newport, Ohio.

Knapp was a student at the McMicken School of Design in Cincinnati in 1871 when his work gained the attention of The Art Review magazine, which commented that he and three of his fellow students were "prominent examples of talent which persistent effort has developed in a remarkable degree." When he was twenty-one years old, he exhibited a painting titled Uncle Sam at the Cincinnati Industrial Exposition of 1874, offering it for sale at $25. By 1877, Knapp had a studio at Pike's Opera House, Cincinnati. His earliest employment was at Russell Morgan Lithography (later named U.S. Playing Card), which produced theater bills and circus posters.

In 1879, Knapp married Emily Spring, and they had a daughter Ethel Camilla Knapp the following year. The Knapps bought a home in Norwood, Ohio, which was then a village still in the process of being built. There they became neighbors to John Uri Lloyd, who built a house less than a mile from the Knapps, and his youngest brother, Curtis Gates Lloyd, who became a well-known mycologist.

On 13 April 1883, Knapp signed a contract with Strobridge Lithography for $45 / week, with a promise of a raise to $50 for his second year at the company - approximately $1,500 / week in today's money.

In April 1894, Knapp designed the cover and some drop-caps for a local guidebook, Norwood, her Homes, and her People - John Lloyd featured prominently in the book as the president of the Norwood Platting Commission. Knapp's name also appeared in it several times – he was recorded as a member of the Board of Health for the village, and a picture of his three-story house with a veranda wrapping the front corner was among the photographs of the homes of prominent villagers scattered through the book.

In 1901, Knapp's daughter Ethel married William Behrman, who moved into their home, and the couple had three children - John Donald in 1903, Marjorie Frances in 1909, and Emily Louisa in 1916. Decker and Dummet say that John Donald remembered being taken to the circus by their grandfather, who sometimes got free tickets through his work – it seems likely that Knapp was still working for Strobridge Lithography at least into John Donald’s early childhood. In 1910 Emily Knapp died from a stroke aged sixty-two.

At some point between 1910 and 1918, Knapp met Dr. Laura Brickly, a cross-dressing eclectic doctor who had trained in John Lloyd's program. They married, and by 1918, Knapp had bought a home in Pleasant Ridge, Cincinnati. He still owned the Norwood house in 1917, when it was listed in an audit of real estate values, and he was listed on the voting register at the same address in 1919, although the tight-knit Behrman family were its real residents. Knapp's daughter, son-in-law, and grandchildren all still lived in the Norwood house when the 1940 census was taken.

In the first two decades of the twentieth century, Knapp drew dozens of illustrated typographic headers and fine pencil drawings that were printed as black and white lithographs, imagining key moments in stories published in a Christian Sunday school literary periodical produced by Standard Publishing called Uniform Lessons, including Girlhood Days and Boy Life.

In 1928, Knapp drew a series of images for a book of poetry by Kingsmill Commander called Vikings of the Stars. In 1935, Knapp designed the cover for his daughter Ethel Knapp Behrman's book of poems titled Doorways, which was published in 1936. It was his last work. Knapp died on 10 March 1938.

== Freemasonry ==
Knapp became a blue lodge freemason in the winter of 1900, taking the three degrees between 21 September and 1 December 1900 at Norwood Lodge, in Cincinnati, then took the four principal Scottish Rite degrees between 4 November 1913, and 29 January 1914. He remained a member of Cincinnati Scottish Rite until his death. Freemasonry passed down the generations – when Ethel Knapp Behrman died suddenly on Sunday 20 June 1943, her obituary in the Cincinnati Enquirer recorded her membership in the Order of the Eastern Star, an initiatory organization for the wives of masons.

== Relationship with John Uri Lloyd ==
Knapp first worked for John Lloyd In 1892 or 1893, painting and drawing delicate pictures of American flora for Volume 1 of Lloyd's Drugs and Medicine which was published in 1894, followed by Volume 2 in 1886. Lloyd hired Knapp to illustrate his first novel, Etidorhpa, published in 1895. Etidorhpa is an unusual piece of nineteenth-century science fiction and occultism, but it is also an early account of the psychedelic experience, and Knapp's imaginative illustrations are among the first examples of Anglo-American psychedelic art. Etidorhpa was a popular and critical hit, printed in eighteen editions, and the illustrations brought Knapp notoriety. In 1896, his Etidorhpa illustrations were published as a series of stereopticon slides by the Pettibone Brothers. In April 1901, the Brooklyn Daily Eagle reported that a new edition of Etidorhpa was published, and that "illustrations by J. Augustus Knapp are peculiarly weird and striking." The Brooklyn Times Union reviewer praised the new edition for Lloyd's writing and Knapp's art, saying, "The illustrations are unusually successful in accentuating the weird gruesomeness which pervades the tale."

Lloyd asked Knapp to illustrate his novella, The Right Side of the Car, published in 1897. Knapp produced a graceful landscape of The Ice on Mount Tacoma, and three greyscale pictures of the protagonists.

Sometime between 1910 and 1920, Knapp painted forty-two watercolors of fungi for Curtis Lloyd, now in the collection of the Lloyd Library.

On 1 January 1930, John Uri Lloyd's Felix Moses the Beloved Jew of Stringtown was published, with copious illustrations by Knapp. In January 1935, Lloyd wrote Knapp a letter discussing his ideas for The Land That Was, But Yet Exists, a sequel to Etidorhpa. Lloyd died on 9 April 1936 at his daughter's home in Van Nuys, aged 86. Before he passed, he instructed Knapp to complete The Land That Was, but the project was never finished.

== Theosophy ==
Knapp was deeply involved in the Cincinnati Theosophical Society and gave lectures to the members as part of a series of Tuesday evening lectures, essays, and readings. Knapp also contributed his art – Volume IX of the Theosophist journal, The Path contained Knapp's drawing, 'The House in Which "Isis Unveiled" Was Written,' illustrating an account of Helena Blavatsky’s residences.

In April 1896, the Cincinnati Enquirer reported that Knapp was going to accompany Dr. Jirah Dewey Buck to the Theosophical Convention in New York the following fortnight. Buck was expected to become - and was duly elected - the next president of the Society. Knapp's wife Emily, and their daughter Ethel accompanied him to the convention. The Cincinnati Enquirer reported that Knapp's portrait of Blavatsky was displayed in front of the stage.

== Working for Thomas H. Ince ==
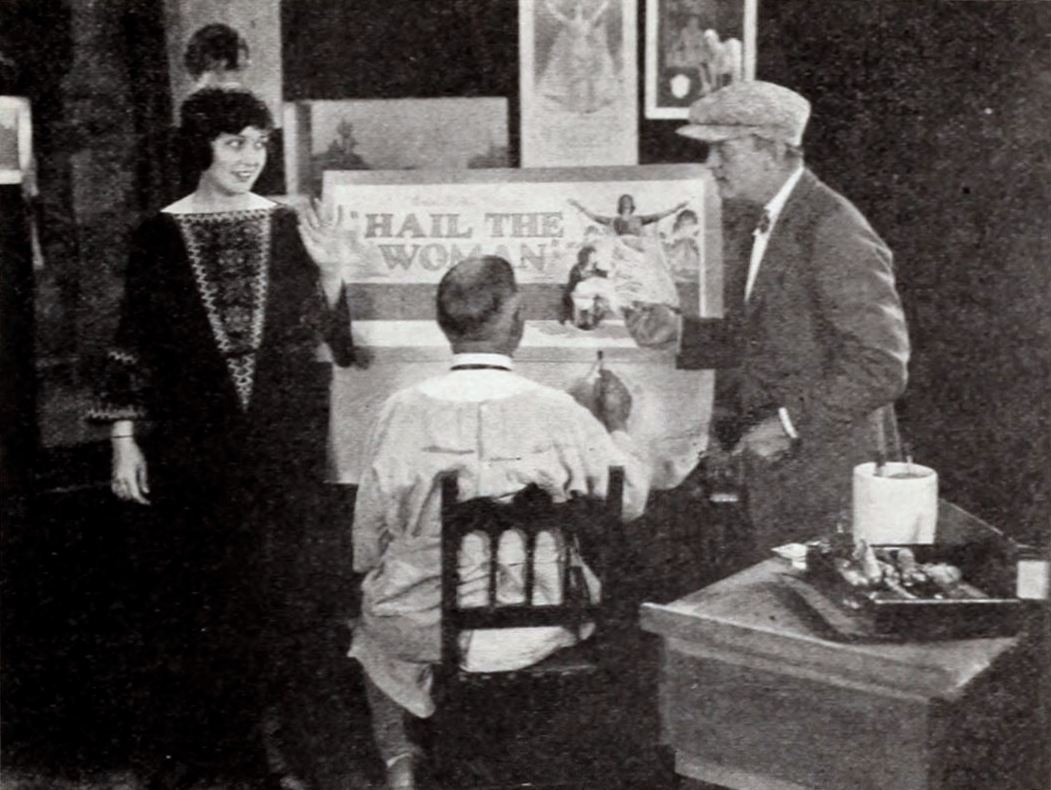
Knapp working on publicity for the Ince Studios production, 'Hail the Woman' (1921).

Soon after the end of the Great War, the Knapps moved to Los Angeles, where Augustus worked for filmmaker Thomas H. Ince producing posters and illustrations. The Knapps moved to Palms. He appeared in an issue of The Silver Sheet, the Ince Studios promotional brochure which was distributed to cinema owners, publicizing Hail the Woman, which was released in 1922. In 1924 Ince suddenly and mysteriously died while negotiating a deal with William Randolph Hearst on his yacht, Oneida.

After Ince's death, Knapp returned to freelance work.

== Working for Manly Hall ==
Knapp met Manly Hall when Hall invited Dr. Laura Knapp to lecture on physiology and anatomy at the Trinity Auditorium in Los Angeles. Hall had read Etidorhpa and admired Knapp's illustrations.

In 1924, Hall published the newly designed second edition of The Lost Keys of Freemasonry, including seven grayscale illustrations by Augustus. In 1925, Hall hired Knapp to illustrate Shadow Forms, and The Ways of the Lonely Ones.

Knapp illustrated James Morgan Pryse’s translation of The Adorers of Dionysos (Bakchai) by Euripides, then began illustrating Hall's The Secret Teachings of all Ages. By the end of 1926, he had produced enough paintings for it that The Los Angeles Evening Post-Record reported that The Ebell Club was holding an informal reception to show "the symbolical watercolor paintings by the well-known artist J. Augustus Knapp, to illustrate Mr. Hall's forthcoming book, ‘Masonic, Hermetic and Rosicrucian Symbolical Philosophy.’"

Knapp published The Revised New Art Tarot Cards in 1929, which soon became known as the Knapp Hall Tarot thanks to Hall's contributions to Knapp's designs. The deck was reissued in 1979 by PRS, in 1985 by U.S. Games Systems, and by PRS in 2023.
