= Erlanger-Elsmere Schools =

School district in Kentucky, United States

Erlanger-Elsmere Independent Schools, Erlanger/Elsmere School District, or Erlanger-Elsmere Schools is a school district headquartered in Erlanger, Kentucky, in the Greater Cincinnati Area.

The district includes portions of Erlanger, Edgewood, and Elsmere.

== History ==
In 1971, John Miles (died 1996) began his term of superintendent. In 1975 Sunset Elementary School was renamed after him. Miles left his position in 1982.

James Molley, a teacher in the district, became superintendent in 1994 and held that position until 2002.

By 2000 the district had a strategy of having larger salaries for new teachers in its salary scale.

Kathlyn Burkhardt became superintendent circa 2009, and held the position until 2020. In 2020 Chad Molley, the son of James Molley, became the superintendent.

== Schools ==
Secondary

- Lloyd Memorial High School
- Tichenor Middle School

Elementary

- Arnett Elementary School
- Howell Elementary School
- Lindeman Elementary School
- Miles Elementary School

Other

- Bartlett Educational Center
