= Eclectic medicine =

Historical branch of American medicine

Eclectic medicine was a branch of American medicine that made use of botanical remedies along with other substances and physical therapy practices, popular in the latter half of the 19th and first half of the 20th centuries.

The term was coined by Constantine Samuel Rafinesque (1784–1841), a botanist and Transylvania University professor who had studied Native American use of medicinal plants, wrote and lectured extensively on herbal medicine, and advised patients and sold remedies by mail. Rafinesque used the word eclectic to refer to those physicians who employed whatever was found to be beneficial to their patients (eclectic being derived from the Greek word eklego, meaning "to choose from").

== History ==
Eclectic medicine appeared as an extension of early American herbal medicine traditions such as "Thomsonian medicine" in the early 19th century, and included Native American medicine. Standard medical practices at the time made extensive use of purges with calomel and other mercury-based remedies, as well as extensive bloodletting. Eclectic medicine was a direct reaction to such practices as well as a desire to restrict Thomsonian medicine innovations to medical "professionals."

Alexander Holmes Baldridge (1795–1874) suggested that because of its American roots the tradition of Eclectic Medicine should be called the American School of Medicine. It bears resemblance to Physiomedicalism, which is practiced in the United Kingdom.

In 1827, a physician named Wooster Beach founded the United States Infirmary on Eldridge Street in New York. Ten years later, he founded the New York Medical Academy, which later became the Reformed Medical College of New York, the parent school of "Reformed Medicine."

The Eclectic Medical Institute in Worthington, Ohio graduated its first class in 1833. After local body snatching led to the notorious "Resurrection Riot" of 1839, the school was evicted from Worthington and settled in Cincinnati during the winter of 1842–43. The Cincinnati school, incorporated as the Eclectic Medical Institute (EMI), continued until its last class graduation in 1939, more than a century later. Over the decades, other Ohio medical schools had been merged into that institution. The American School of Medicine (Eclectic) in Cincinnati operated from 1839 to 1857, when it merged with the Eclectic Medical Institute.

Eclectic medicine expanded during the 1840s as part of a large, populist anti-regular medical movement in North America. It used many principles of Samuel Thomson's family herbal medication but chose to train doctors in physiology and more conventional principles, along with botanical medicine. The American School of Medicine (Eclectic) trained physicians in a dozen or so privately funded medical schools, principally located in the midwestern United States. By the 1850s, several "regular" American medical tradespersons, especially from the New York Academy of Medicine, had begun using herbal salves and other preparations.

The movement peaked in the 1880s and 1890s. The schools were not approved by the Flexner Report (1910), which was commissioned by a council within the American Medical Association. The report criticised Eclectic medical schools on the grounds that they had poor laboratory facilities and inadequate opportunities for clinical education in hospitals In 1934, J. C. Hubbard, M.D., the president of the Eclectic Medical Association said:

We must choose between being absorbed by the dominant section, our professional activities dictated and controlled, our policies subject to the approval of an unfriendly, prejudiced, self-constituted authority, and soon lose our identity as the Eclectic Section of American Medicine, or adapt ourselves to the general social change and retain the old Eclectic values of individual freedom of thought and action, independence in practice and the right to use that which has stood the test of experience in our service to mankind.

The last Eclectic Medical school closed in Cincinnati in 1939. The Lloyd Library and Museum still maintains the greatest collection of books, papers and publications of the Eclectic physicians, including libraries from the Eclectic medical schools.

The contemporary herbalist Michael Moore recounts:

In 1990 I visited the Lloyd Library in Cincinnati, Ohio, where, in the basement, I found the accumulated libraries of ALL the Eclectic medical schools, shipped off to the Eclectic Medical College (the "Mother School") as, one by one, they died. Finally, even the E.M.C. died (1939) and there they all were, holding on by the slimmest thread, the writings of a discipline of medicine that survived for a century, was famous (or infamous) for its vast plant 'materia medica,' treated the patient and NOT the pathology, a sophisticated model of vitalist healing.

Major Eclectic practitioners include John Uri Lloyd, John Milton Scudder, Harvey Wickes Felter, John King, Andrew Jackson Howe, Finley Ellingwood, Frederick J. Locke, William N. Mundy, and Henry Wohlgemuth. Harvey Wickes Felter's Eclectic Materia Medica is one of several important Eclectic medical publications dating from the 1920s. It represented a last attempt to stem the tide of "standard practice medicine", the antithesis of the model of the rural primary care vitalist physician who was the basis for Eclectic practice.
