= Harvey Wickes Felter =

American herbalist (1865–1927)

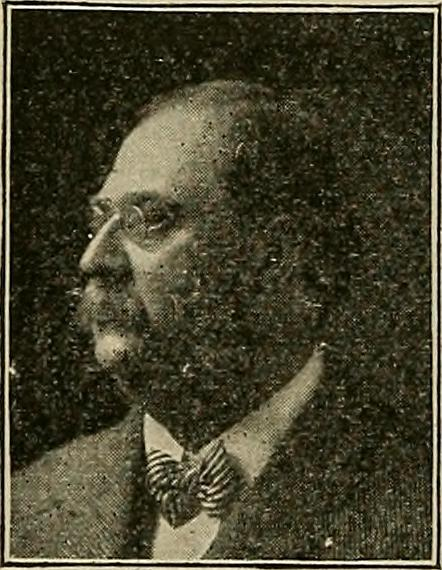
Harvey W. Felter (1909)

Harvey Wickes Felter (June 15, 1865 in Rensselaerville, New York–1927) was an eclectic medicine doctor and author of Eclectic Materia Medica. He was co-author, with John Uri Lloyd, of King's American Dispensatory.

== Works ==
- Biographies of John King, Andrew Jackson Howe, and John Milton Scudder : accompanied by many valuable and historical portraits and other illustrations . Lloyd, Cincinnati, Ohio 1912 Digital edition by the University and State Library Düsseldorf
