= Etidorhpa =

1895 novel by John Uri Lloyd

- Second edition
- Author: John Uri Lloyd
- Illustrator: John Augustus Knapp
- Language: English
- Genre: Documentary; Science fiction
- Publisher: privately printed
- Publication date: 1895
- Publication place: United States
- Media type: Print (Hardcover)

Etidorhpa, or, the end of the earth: the strange history of a mysterious being and the account of a remarkable journey is the title of a scientific allegory or science fiction novel by John Uri Lloyd, a pharmacognosist and pharmaceutical manufacturer of Cincinnati, Ohio. Etidorhpa was published in 1895.

The word "Etidorhpa" is the backward spelling of the name "Aphrodite." The first editions of Etidorhpa were distributed privately; later editions of the book feature numerous fanciful illustrations by John Augustus Knapp. Eventually a popular success, the book had eighteen editions and was translated into seven languages. Etidorhpa literary clubs were founded in the United States, and some parents named their infant daughters Etidorhpa.

== Concept ==
The book purports to be a manuscript dictated by a strange being named I-Am-The-Man to a man named Llewyllyn Drury. Drury's adventure culminates in a trek through a cave in Kentucky into the core of the earth. Ideas presented in Etidorhpa include practical alchemy, secret Masonic orders, the Hollow Earth theory, and the concept of transcending the physical realm.

== Hollow Earth ==
Etidorhpa belongs to a subgenre of fiction which shares elements of science fiction, fantasy, utopian fiction, and scientific (or pseudoscientific) speculation, Jules Verne's Journey to the Center of the Earth being the most famous novel of this type. Its literary conceit is that of another world in the center of a hollow earth. In Lloyd's generation Edward Bulwer-Lytton's The Coming Race was also popular and influential. (In the next Edgar Rice Burroughs wrote a series of hollow earth novels, by which time the format was pulp fiction.)

== Drugs ==
Since Lloyd was a pharmacologist, his novel has provoked speculation that drug use contributed to its fantastic and visionary nature. Substances from marijuana and opium to nightshade, henbane, jimsonweed, and psilocybin mushrooms have been suggested as possibilities, although no real evidence on the matter is available.

== Synopsis ==
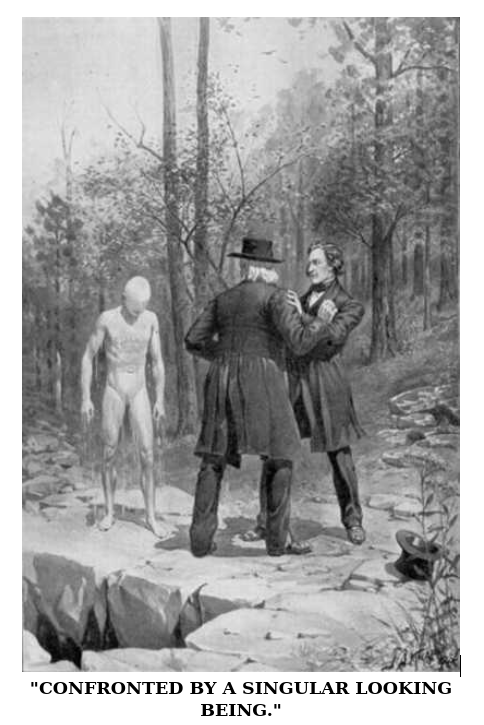
The protagonist meets his psychopomp

Following a framing device, the book's first chapter begins the story of how Drury met the mysterious I-Am-The-Man, who reads his own manuscript account of his adventures to Drury over many sessions. The mysterious stranger, also known as The-Man-Who-Did-It, relates events that supposedly occurred thirty years earlier, during the early part of the 19th century.

By his account, the speaker is kidnapped by fellow members of a secret society, because he is suspected to be a threat to their secrecy. (This was likely based on the 1826 kidnapping of William Morgan and the start of the Anti-Masonry movement.) I-Am-The-Man is taken to a cave in Kentucky; there he is led by a cavern dweller on a long subterranean journey. It becomes an inner journey of the spirit as much as a geographical trip through underground realms. The book blends passages on the nature of physical phenomena, such as gravity and volcanoes, with spiritualist speculation and adventure-story elements (like traversing a landscape of giant mushrooms). The whole ends with a summary from I-Am-The-Man and a conclusion from Drury. Subsequent editions of the book added various prefatory and supplementary materials.
