= Lloyd Memorial High School =

Location
- 450 Bartlett Avenue; Erlanger, Kentucky 41018; USA; 39.0206°N 84.6083°W

Information
- Established: 1928
- School district: Erlanger-Elsmere Independent Schools
- Teaching staff: 36.21 (FTE)
- Grades: 9-12
- Enrollment: 629 (2018–19)
- Student to teacher ratio: 17.37
- Colors: Navy and Vegas gold
- Nickname: Juggernauts
- Affiliations: Kentucky High School Athletic Association
- Website: lmhs.erlanger.kyschools.us

Lloyd Memorial High School is a high school located in Erlanger, Kentucky. Part of the Erlanger-Elsmere School District, it has an enrollment of 515 students in grades 9–12.

Its boundary includes portions of Erlanger, Edgewood, and Elsmere.

== History ==
Lloyd Memorial High School was established in 1928 upon the merger of the Erlanger and Elsmere school districts. The school was named after the pharmacist John Uri Lloyd, who gave money and books for the new school.

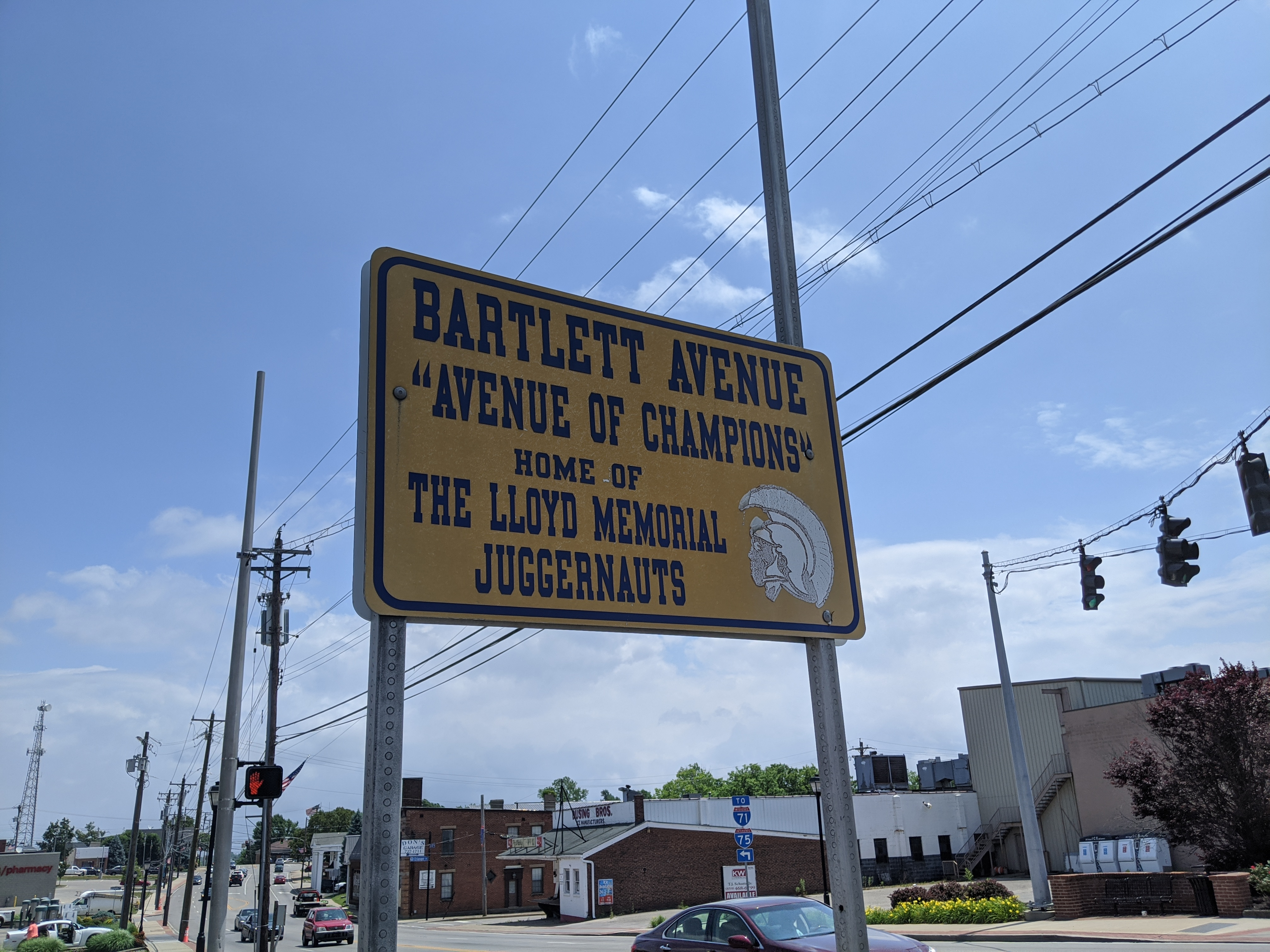
Lloyd Memorial High School "Avenue of Champions" sign on Barlett Avenue.

In 1956, the school was one of the first high schools in the United States to be racially desegregated after the United States Supreme Court's decision in Brown v. Board of Education. Its success in doing so was featured in a Life magazine article.

== Notable alumni ==
- Charles Johnson, NFL wide receiver
- Billy Lyon, NFL defensive end/tackle
- Brandon Faris, documentary filmmaker
