= Lloyd Library and Museum =

Private research library in Cincinnati, Ohio, U.S.

Coordinates: 39°06′19″N 84°31′09″W

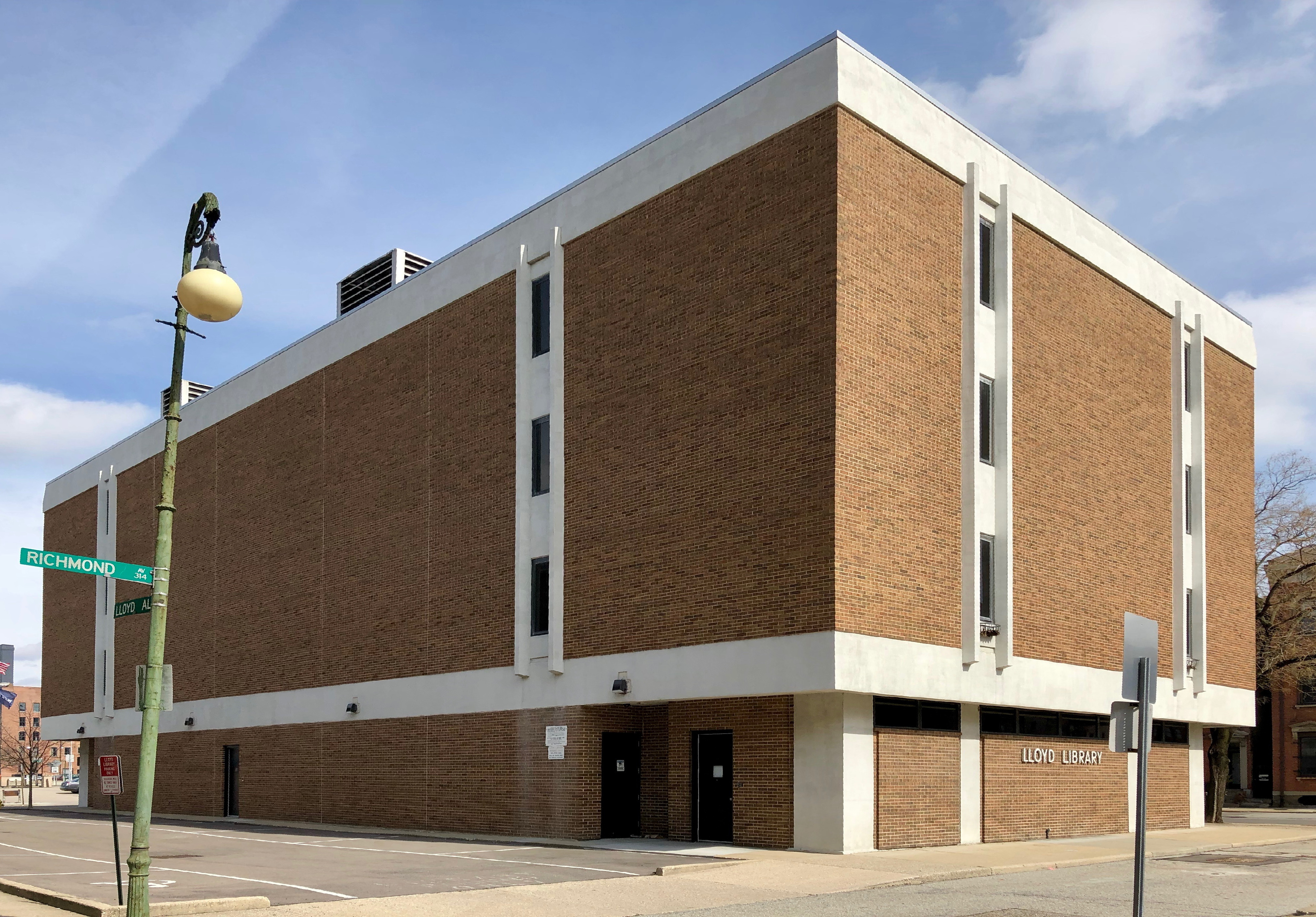
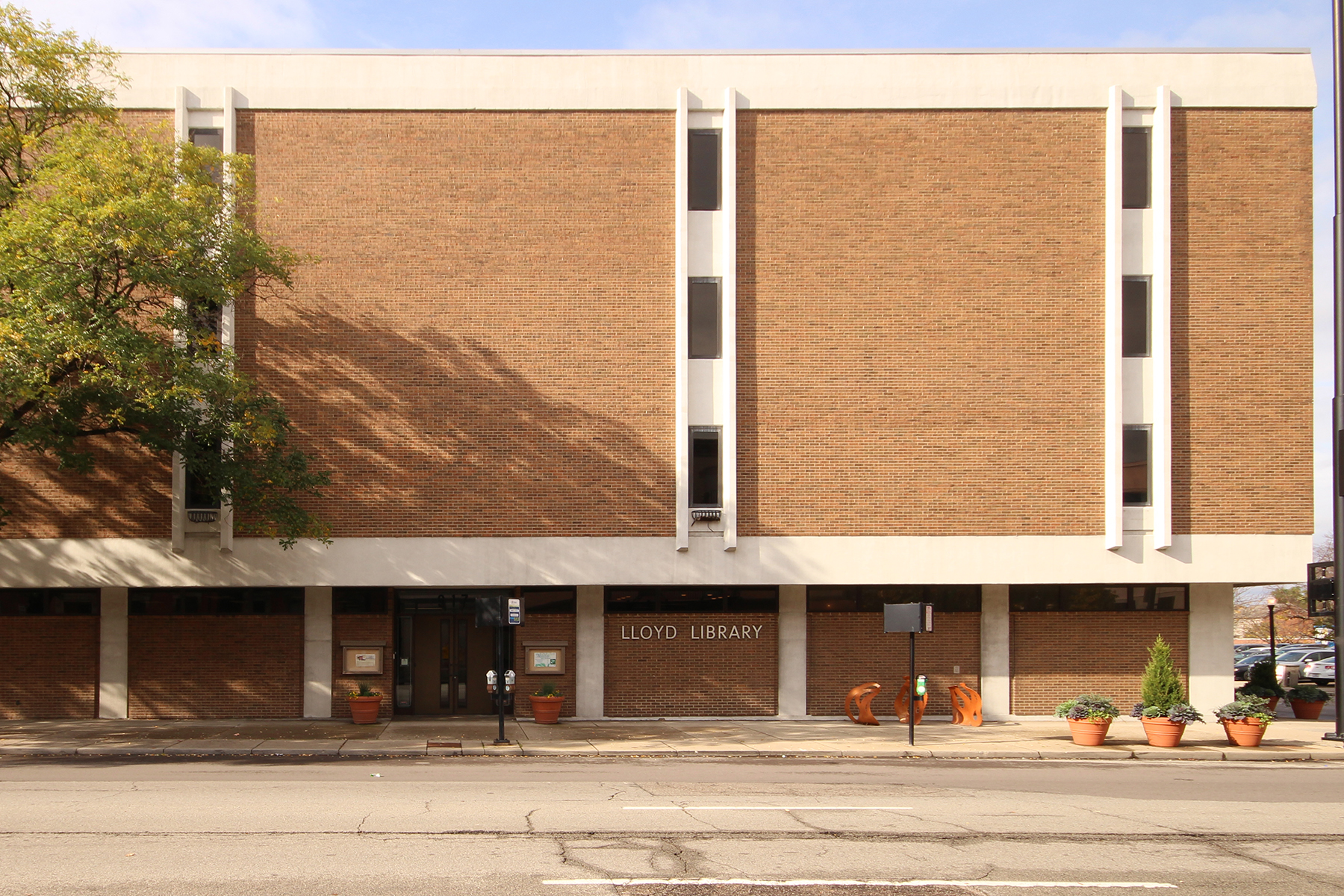
- Lloyd Library in 2019 Lloyd Library in 2017
- Location: Cincinnati, Ohio, United States
- Type: Independent research library
- Scope: Medicinal plants, botany, pharmacy, history of medicine and science
- Established: 1870s

Collection
- Items collected: Books, periodicals, archival materials, artifacts
- Size: 150,000 volumes, 3,000 linear feet of archives, 3,000 artifacts

Access and use
- Access requirements: Free, open to the public
- Circulation: Non-circulating

Other information
- Website: www.lloydlibrary.org

Lloyd Library and Museum is an independent research library located in downtown Cincinnati, Ohio. Its core subject and collection focus is medicinal plants, with emphasis on botany, pharmacy, natural history, alternative medicine, and the history of medicine and science.

== Scope and Holdings ==
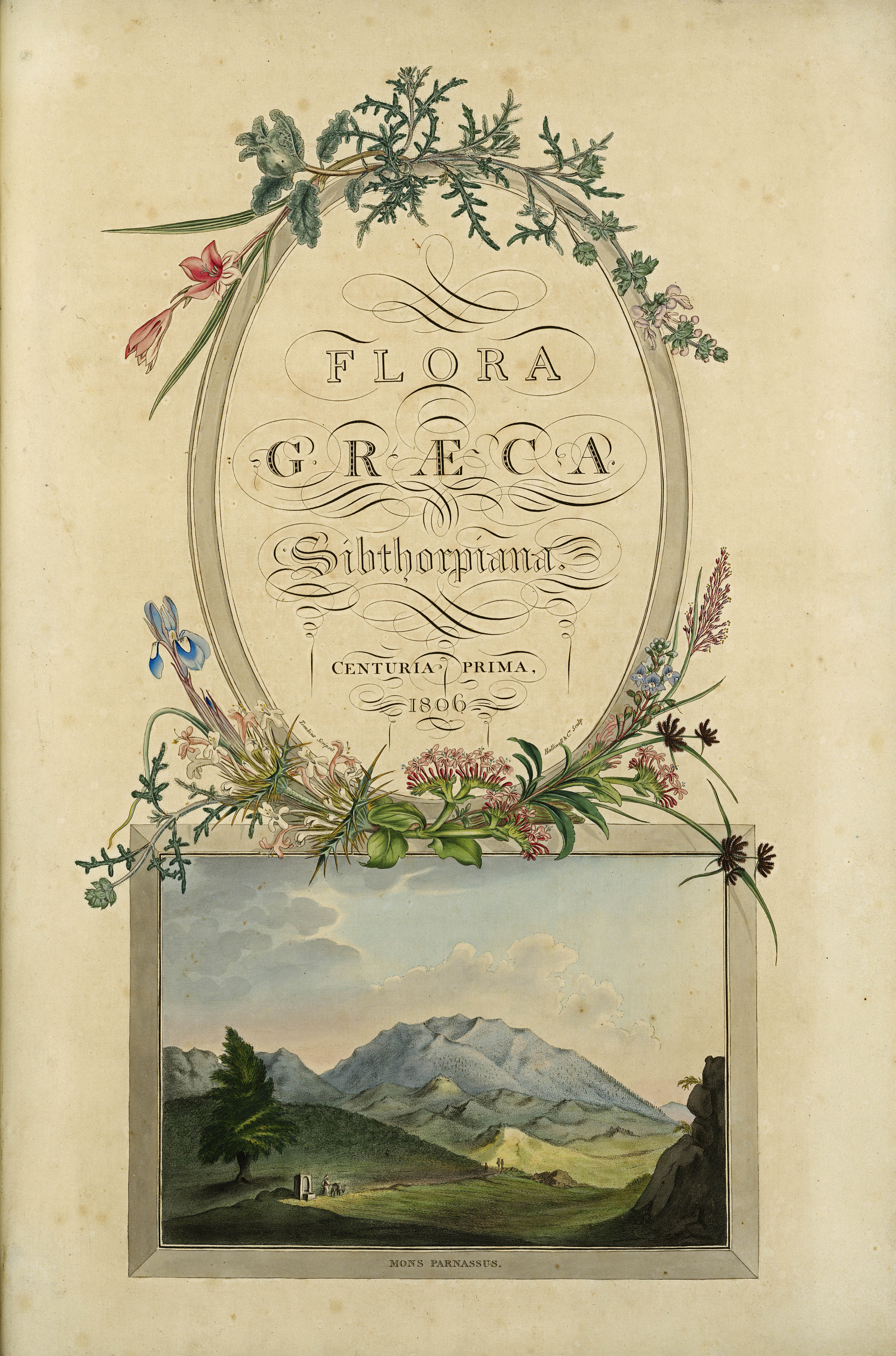
Volume 1 frontispiece, Flora Graeca by John Sibthorp (1806–1840)

The collections focus on botany, mycology, pharmacy, herbal medicine, chemistry, natural history, horticulture, and the history of medicine and science. The Lloyd also holds material on alchemy, evolution, ecology, ethnobotany, midwifery, entomology, ornithology, agriculture, exploration and travel, and the science of food and cooking. The print collections consist of monographs, serials, reference resources, and rare books dating back to 1493; the archives collections chronicle the work of botanists, pharmacognosists, pharmacists, illustrators, artists, and allied organizations. The Lloyd holds the personal collections of John Uri Lloyd, Curtis Gates Lloyd and the institutional records of Lloyd Brothers, Pharmacists, Inc., and the Eclectic Medical College/Eclectic Medical Institution. Other formats collected include photographs and slides, medicinal and pharmaceutical artifacts, and artwork.

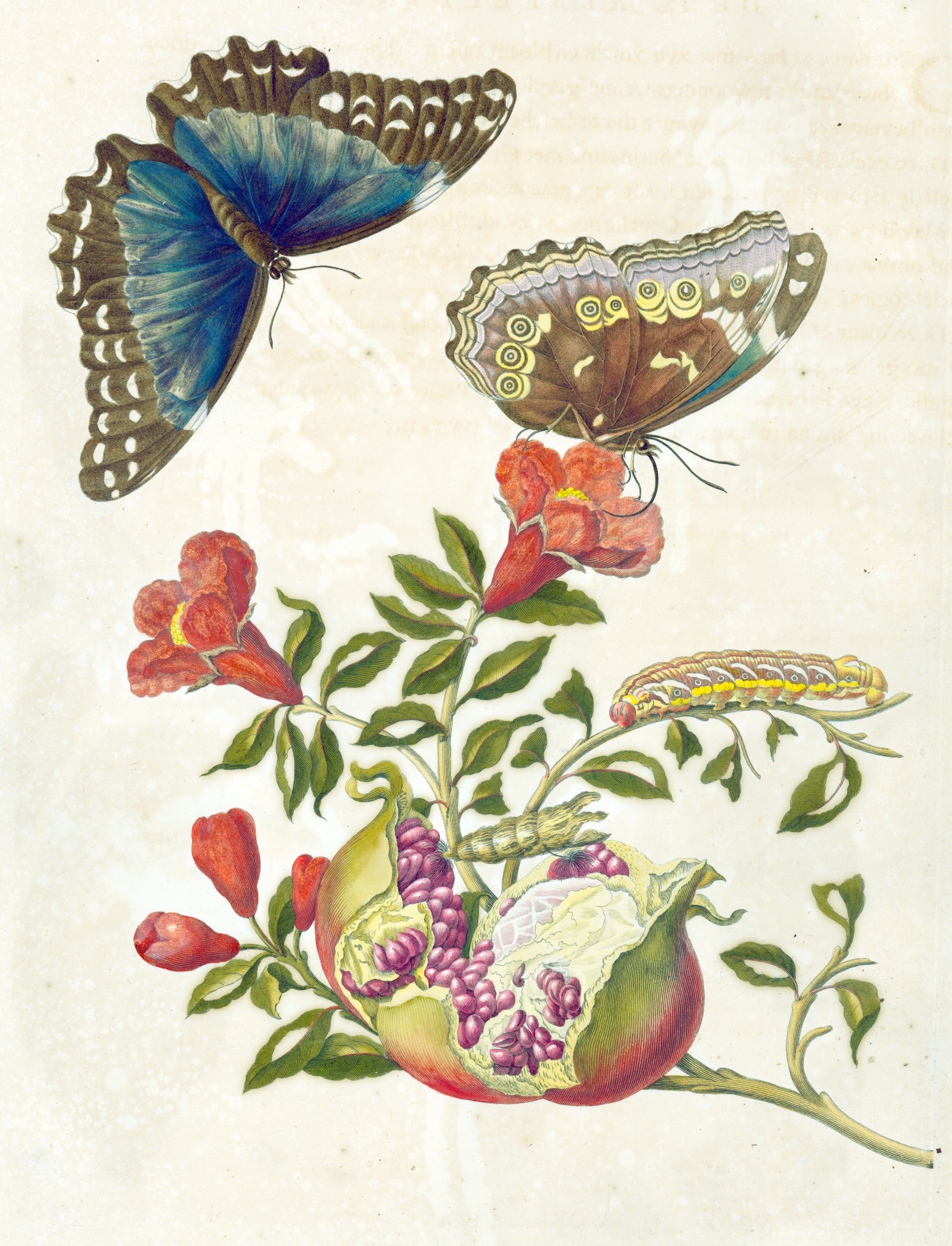
Plate 9, Maria Sibylla Merian's Metamorphosis Insectorum Surinamensium (1730)

== Rare Books ==
- First editions of On the Origin of Species by Means of Natural Selection by Charles Darwin (1859), Flora Graeca by John Sibthorp (1806–1840), and The Natural History of Carolina, Florida, and the Bahama Islands by Mark Catesby (1731–1743)
- The 1705 and 1730 editions of Maria Sibylla Merian's Metamorphosis Insectorum Surinamensium
- James Bateman's Orchidaceae of Mexico and Guatemala (1837–1843)
- The second edition of Description de l'Egypte (1821–1830), documenting Napoleon's French army expedition to Egypt
- A complete and current run of Curtis's Botanical Magazine, 1793–present
- Jean-Jacques Rousseau's personal copy of the herbal Omnium Stripium Sciagraphia et Icones by Dominique Chabrey (1678)
- A Curious Herbal (1737–1739) and Herbarium Blackwellianum Emendatum et Auctum (1750–1773) by Elizabeth Blackwell
- Les Liliacees by Pierre-Joseph Redouté (1802–1816)
