= Curtis Gates Lloyd =

American mycologist (1859–1926)

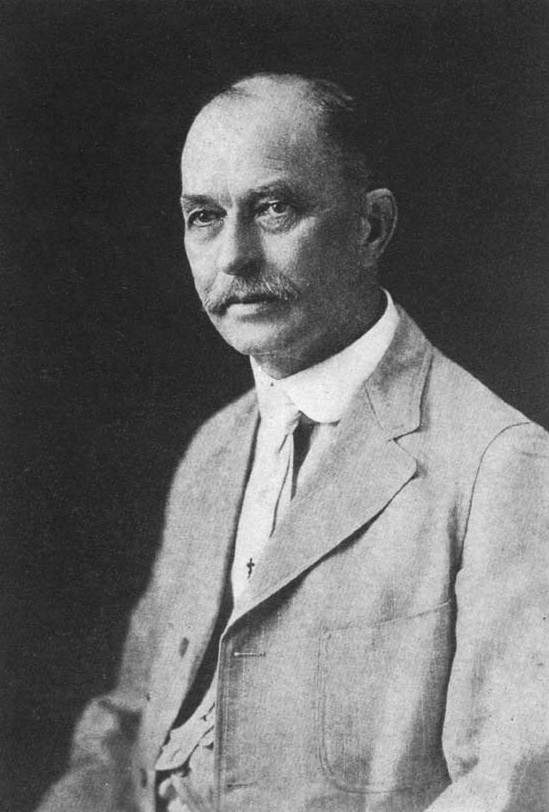
- Born: July 17, 1859; Florence, Kentucky, US
- Died: November 11, 1926 (aged 67); Cincinnati, Ohio, US
- Known for: Contribution to knowledge of the Gasteromycetes
- Relatives: John Uri Lloyd (brother)
- Scientific career
- Fields: Mycology
- Author abbrev. (botany): Lloyd

Curtis Gates Lloyd (July 17, 1859 – November 11, 1926) was an American mycologist known for both his research on the gasteroid and polypore fungi, as well as his controversial views on naming conventions in taxonomy. He had a herbarium with about 60,000 fungal specimens, and described over a thousand new species of fungi. Along with his two brothers John Uri Lloyd and Nelson Ashley Lloyd, he founded the Lloyd Library and Museum in Cincinnati.

== Early life ==
Born on July 17, 1859, in Florence, Kentucky, Curtis Gates Lloyd was the third son of Nelson Marvin and Sophia Webster Lloyd. He and his family moved to Crittenden, Kentucky, in 1867, where Lloyd lived until he was 18. He moved to Cincinnati and was employed as an apprentice in Johnson's pharmacy. This was where he met Dr. John King, physician and editor of the American Dispensatory; the close friendship they formed helped to fuel Lloyd's interest in botany. Lloyd earned his pharmacy certificate while working at the pharmacy. Later, Lloyd was a salesman with Hale, Justice and Co., a drug supply company, and he began accumulating a personal collection of flowering plants.

== Career ==
Lloyd, together with his brother John Uri Lloyd, started publishing Drugs and Medicines of North America, a quarterly publication that became popular in the fields of botany and medicine. Two years later, he and his two brothers became owners of Lloyd Brothers Manufacturing Pharmacists; Curtis Lloyd's specialty was researching pharmaceuticals from medicinal plants.

Lloyd's interest in mycology was initiated after a meeting with Andrew Price Morgan in 1887. Soon after, Lloyd directed his attention to the study of the Gasteromycetes, taking field trips and forays to various exotic locales, and collecting more specimens for his growing personal herbarium. In the early 1900s, Lloyd established offices in both Kew, London and in Paris, France. He began publishing his mycological findings, and quickly gained a reputation for his views on the use of personal names in the identification of fungi. He became well known for publishing tirades against the convention of citing author's names after the generic name and specific epithet of plants and fungi, a practice he called "species-grinding". Because he published privately, Lloyd was free to criticize other mycologists guilty of hastily publishing new species. In the article "The Myths of Mycology" (1917) he wrote,

... the mistakes, blunders, and personal foibles of mycological writers have been my chief source of pleasure. I have never failed to express myself plainly, and have spared neither friend nor antagonist. I have always tried to be good-natured in my comments, and as a general thing the parties affected are taking it more as a joke on themselves and an idiosyncrasy of myself. ... Nor am I deceiving myself into the belief that I will accomplish what I am trying to bring about, the abolition of personal advertisements in mycology.

His conservative approach to classification was later criticized by Marinus Anton Donk, who wrote "The terror that Lloyd spread among North American mycologists and abroad by ridiculing everything that reminded him of taxonomic innovation in the systematics of fungi ... has not yet been completely overcome. His slipshod taxonomic methods were accepted as standard by some of his correspondents."

Lloyd spent much of the latter half of his career working on the polypore fungi, of which he amassed an extensive collection later described by Josiah L. Lowe as "undoubtedly the best single source of information on the species of the world."

In 1926, plagued by failing eyesight, Lloyd was forced to retire from his mycological work, and returned to Crittenden, where he lived until his death from complications of diabetes, on November 6, 1926. Most of his wealth was placed in endowment with the Lloyd Library and Museum.

== Publications ==
He published 26 issues of The Bulletin of the Lloyd Library; six of these were written by him on mycological subjects. He also published 75 issues of Mycological Notes over a period of 28 years (1898–1925).

- (1908). Mycological Notes 2: 205–412.
- (1912). Index of Mycological Writings 4 (39): 510–540. Cincinnati, Ohio; Lloyd.
- (1916). Puerto Rican collections. Mycological Writings 5: 582, 1 fig.
- (1916). Puerto Rican collections (letter 63: 8, 13). Mycological Writings 5: 626, 1 fig.
- (1917). Notes on the Xylarias. Mycological Writings 5: 675–679.
- (1917). Notes on the Xylarias. Mycological Writings (Myc. Notes No 51) 5: 724–725.
- (1917). The globose Xilarias. Mycological Writings (Myc. Notes No 51) 5: 727-728.
- (1917). Rare or interesting fungi. Mycological Writings (Myc. Notes No 51) 5: 729–732.
- (1917). Aleurodiscus vitellinus. Mycological Writings (Myc. Notes No 52) 5: 736–737, 1 fig.
- (1917). Letter No. 65. March 1917. Mycological Writings 1–16.
- (1917). The genus Cyttaria. Mycological Writings No. 48 5: 671–674.
- (1917). Puerto Rican collections. Mycological Writings 5: 675–676, 6 figs.
- (1917). Puerto Rican collections (letter 66: 6, 10). Mycological Writings 5: 726, 3 figs.
- (1918). Puerto Rican collections (letter 67: 9, 68: 6, 12). Mycological Writings 5.
- (1919). Rare or interesting fungi received from correspondents. Mycological Writings (Myc. Notes No 57) 5: 816–828.
- (1920). Mycological notes no. 64. Mycological Writings 6: 985–1029.
- (1921). Mycological Notes 6: 1–1101.
- (1921). Puerto Rican collections (Fink). Mycological Writings 6: 1044, 1071–1072, 1 fig.
- (1922). Mycological Notes 7(2): 1135–1168.
- (1922). Puerto Rican collections (Chardón). Mycological Writings 7: 1114, 1123.
- (1923). Novel and noteworthy specimens received from correspondents. Index of the Mycological Notes7: 1105–1364.
- (1925). Puerto Rican collections (Tucker). Mycological Writings 7: 1353, 1354, 5 figs.

The standard author abbreviation Lloyd is used to indicate this person as the author when citing a botanical name.

== See also ==
- Category:Taxa named by Curtis Gates Lloyd
