= Henriette Kress =

Finnish herbalist (born 1963)

Henriette Kress (born 1963) is a Finnish herbalist.

== Early life ==
Kress was born in Germany and is of German descent. She moved to Finland with her family when she was eleven years old. Kress is a Swedish-speaking Finn.

== Publications ==
Kress is the author of two herbal books in English, four in Finnish and one in Swedish:

English

- Practical Herbs (2011), ISBN 978-952-67575-0-6
- Practical Herbs 2 (2013), ISBN 978-952-68025-0-3

Finnish

- Mintusta voikukkaan – käytännön lääkekasvit (2000), ISBN 951-37-3072-7
- Hanhikista kissanminttuun – käytännön lääkekasvit (2001), ISBN 951-37-3425-0
- Käytännön lääkekasvit (2010), ISBN 978-952-92-7813-8
- Käytännön lääkekasvit 2 (2012), ISBN 978-952-67575-6-8

Swedish

- Praktiska läkeörter (2011), ISBN 978-952-92-8648-5
