= Michael Moore (herbalist) =

American medicinal herbalist and author

- Michael Moore
- Born: January 9, 1941; Bellingham, Washington
- Died: February 20, 2009 (aged 68); Tucson, Arizona
- Education: California Institute of the Arts
- Occupations: Herbalist, composer, author
- Known for: Founder of Southwest School of Botanical Medicine

Michael Roland Shaw Moore (January 9, 1941 – February 20, 2009) was a seminal figure in the revival and renewal of American herbalism in the latter half of the 20th Century.

Born in Bellingham, WA, he moved to Los Angeles at 5 years of age.

A graduate of California Institute of the Arts, where he received his degree in musical composition, Michael Moore was a musician and composed of several symphonies from the 1970s through the 1980s.

== Work ==
Michael Moore founded the Herbs, Etc. store in Santa Fe, NM in the mid 1970s, founded and directed the Southwest School of Botanical Medicine (SWSBM) from 1988 - 2006, and wrote several groundbreaking reference books centered on regional botanical medicine. The Southwest School of Botanical Medicine with its five month Botanical Medicine residency program, operated for 28 years. Initially based in Bisbee, AZ, it operated in Silver City and Albuquerque, NM for several years, and returned to Bisbee, AZ. In partnership with acupuncturist Stuart Watts, Michael founded the former Institute for Traditional Medicine in Santa Fe in the 1980’s.

For over three decades, his herbal educational programs - extended Summer field classes, regional books featuring Western medicinal plants, conference lectures, and the five month SWSBM intensive Botanical Medicine program - provided an valuable foundation for an many practicing herbalists. His residency program included detailed instruction on clinical practice.

“He made his original Western Energetic Herbal Medicine teachings incredibly accessible to people who didn’t feel drawn to Traditional Chinese Medicine (TCM) or Ayurveda. Michael is one of the 3 most important figures in the late 20th century renaissance, of not only American herbal medicine, but of constitutional/energetic herbal medicine worldwide.” (herbalist and ethnobotanist David Winston. Oral communication, March 24, 2009).

“In describing clinical manifestations, he presented a shocking level of clinical detail for someone who had no clinical training. It’s why his work holds up.” (herbalist, educator, and clinician Adam Seller. Oral communication, 2023)

Dubbed the "Godfather of the American herbal movement" by Mark Blumenthal, founder and executive director of the American Botanical Council, he holds a singular place as an herbal educator and clinician in the revitalization of Western Botanical Medicine.

== Resources ==
Moore was a major contributor in the reintroduction of many historical texts of botanical medicine which had been lost to the general public.

Michael Moore's web site, SWSBM.org, is a major source of scanned original historical material from the Eclectics, Thomsonian medicalists, and Physiomedicalists, of hundreds of plant images and data, as well as his invaluable SWSBM teaching materials, which remain in widespread use. All of these resources are provided free in keeping with his wishes. He lectured widely at numerous conferences during his lifetime, and published several books, including:

- Medicinal Plants of the Mountain West (1979, 2003) Museum of New Mexico Press ISBN 978-0-89013-454-2
- Medicinal Plants of the Desert and Canyon West (1989) Museum of New Mexico Press ISBN 978-0-89013-591-4
- Medicinal Plants of the Pacific West (1993, 2011) Museum of New Mexico Press ISBN 978-0-89013-592-1
- Herbs for the Urinary Tract (1998) Keats Publishing ISBN 978-0-87983-815-7
- Los Remedios: Traditional Herbal Remedies of the Southwest (2008) Museum of New Mexico Press ISBN 978-0-89013-580-8
- Healing Herbs of the Upper Rio Grande: Traditional Medicine of the Southwest Original book by ethnobotanist Leonora S.M. Curtin

== Death and Legacy ==
Moore died in Tucson, Arizona in 2009 of complications of kidney disease. He is survived by his wife, Donna Chesner, who served as an administrator for the Southwest School of Botanical Medicine from 1991 to 2006. Moore's writings, books and recordings are held in the New Mexico State Archives.

== See also ==
- Eclectic medicine
- Herbalism
- Pharmacognosy
- Botany
- Ethnobotany
