= Elsmere, Kentucky =

- City
- Location of Elsmere in Kenton County, Kentucky
- Coordinates: 38°59′42″N 84°36′06″W
- Country: United States
- State: Kentucky
- County: Kenton
- Incorporated: May 11, 1896

Government
  - Type: Mayor-Council
  - Mayor: Marty Lenhof

Area
  - Total: 2.64 sq mi (6.85 km^{2})
  - Land: 2.63 sq mi (6.81 km^{2})
  - Water: 0.015 sq mi (0.04 km^{2})
- Elevation: 833 ft (254 m)

Population (2020)
  - Total: 9,159
  - Estimate (2022): 9,148
  - Density: 3,485.7/sq mi (1,345.83/km^{2})
- Time zone: UTC-5 (Eastern (EST))
  - Summer (DST): UTC-4 (EDT)
- ZIP code: 41018
- Area code: 859
- FIPS code: 21-24778
- GNIS feature ID: 2403562
- Website: www.cityofelsmere.com

Elsmere is a home rule-class city in Kenton County, Kentucky, in the United States. The population was 9,159 at the 2020 census.

== Geography ==
Elsmere is located in western Kenton County and is bordered to the north and east by Erlanger, to the south by Independence, and to the west by Florence in Boone County. The Dixie Highway (U.S. Routes 25, 42, and 127) forms the northern border of the city and leads northeast 7 miles (11 km) to Covington and southwest 1.5 miles (2.4 km) to the center of Florence.

According to the United States Census Bureau, Elsmere has a total area of 2.7 square miles (6.9 km^{2}), of which 0.02 square miles (0.05 km^{2}), or 0.73%, are water.

== History ==
The community was first settled in 1885 as "South Erlanger". Elsmere has historically been a largely African-American city, and originally had an African-American school house Known as the Dunbar School on Spring Street. Elsmere also had an African-American baseball team. There is also a park on Capitol Avenue named after Rosella Porterfield, who taught at the Historic Dunbar School. Elsmere organized as a city in 1896, renamed after Elsmere Avenue in Norwood, Ohio, the hometown of one of its founders.

== Government ==
In 1998, Billy Bradford was elected mayor of Elsmere, the first African-American mayor elected in northern Kentucky. He served 12 years (three terms), and later served as a member of the city council. The current mayor is Marty Lenhof.

== Economy ==
Regal Beloit (formerly Emerson Power Transmission) and L'Oréal have facilities in an unincorporated pocket of Kenton County surrounded by Elsmere. Portions of Elsmere have a Florence mailing address. Mazak's North American headquarters are in Elsmere.

== Education ==
Portions of the cities of Elsmere and adjacent Erlanger share a public school system: Erlanger/Elsmere Independent School District.

The following schools are shared by the areas of the two cities within the Erlanger/Elsmere school district:

Primary schools

- Arnett Elementary School
- Howell Elementary School
- Lindeman Elementary School
- Miles Elementary School
- Tichenor Middle School

Secondary schools

- Lloyd Memorial High School

A portion of Elsmere is in the Kenton County School District

== Demographics ==
Historical population
Census	Pop.	Note	%±
1900	519		—
1910	900		73.4%
1920	919		2.1%
1930	2,917		217.4%
1940	2,885		−1.1%
1950	3,483		20.7%
1960	4,607		32.3%
1970	5,161		12.0%
1980	7,203		39.6%
1990	6,847		−4.9%
2000	8,139		18.9%
2010	8,451		3.8%
2020	9,159		8.4%
2024 (est.)	9,337		1.9%
U.S. Decennial Census

=== 2020 census ===
As of the 2020 census, Elsmere had a population of 9,159. The median age was 32.8 years. 28.0% of residents were under the age of 18 and 11.3% of residents were 65 years of age or older. For every 100 females there were 94.2 males, and for every 100 females age 18 and over there were 92.6 males age 18 and over.

100.0% of residents lived in urban areas, while 0.0% lived in rural areas.

There were 3,304 households in Elsmere, of which 38.0% had children under the age of 18 living in them. Of all households, 38.3% were married-couple households, 20.0% were households with a male householder and no spouse or partner present, and 28.9% were households with a female householder and no spouse or partner present. About 24.5% of all households were made up of individuals and 7.8% had someone living alone who was 65 years of age or older.

There were 3,515 housing units, of which 6.0% were vacant. The homeowner vacancy rate was 1.8% and the rental vacancy rate was 6.9%.

Racial composition as of the 2020 census
Race	Number	Percent
White	7,047	76.9%
Black or African American	567	6.2%
American Indian and Alaska Native	53	0.6%
Asian	89	1.0%
Native Hawaiian and Other Pacific Islander	13	0.1%
Some other race	549	6.0%
Two or more races	841	9.2%
Hispanic or Latino (of any race)	979	10.7%

=== 2010 census ===
According to the 2010 U.S. census, there were 8,451 people, 2,992 households, and 2,131 families residing in the city. The racial makeup was 61.0% white, 22.2% black, 0.4% Native American, 0.4% Asian American, 0.2% Native Hawaiian or other Pacific Islander, 4.2% some other race, and 3.4% two or more races. 8.2% of the population were Hispanic or Latino of any race.
