= Erlanger, Kentucky =

- City
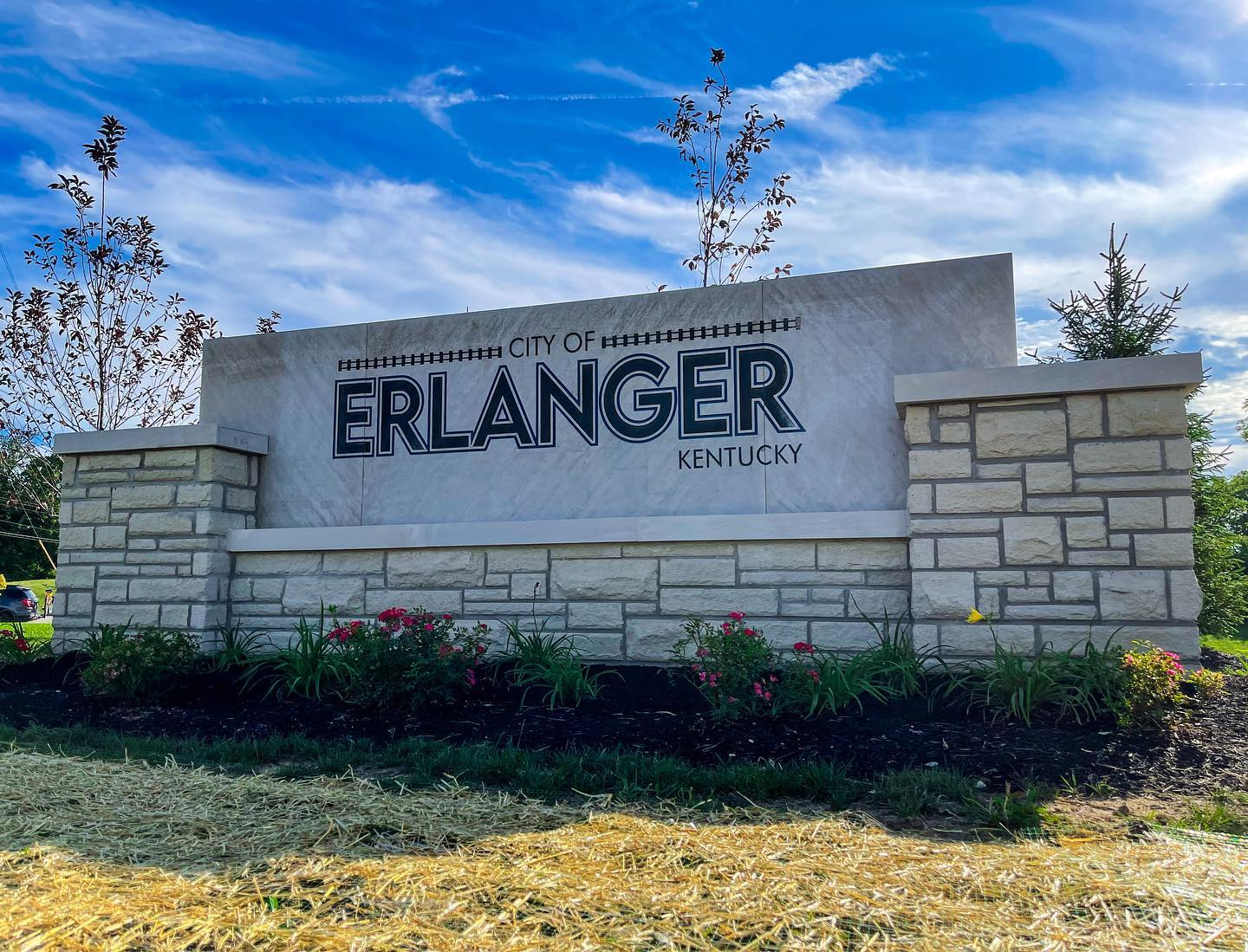
- Nickname: The Friendship City
- Location of Erlanger in Kenton County, Kentucky
- Coordinates: 39°01′53″N 84°36′07″W
- Country: United States
- State: Kentucky
- County: Kenton

Government
  - Type: Mayor-Council
  - Mayor: Jessica Fette
  - City Administrator: Mark Collier

Area
  - Total: 8.54 sq mi (22.13 km^{2})
  - Land: 8.38 sq mi (21.70 km^{2})
  - Water: 0.17 sq mi (0.44 km^{2})
- Elevation: 833 ft (254 m)

Population (2020)
  - Total: 19,611
  - Estimate (2022): 19,756
  - Density: 2,340.9/sq mi (903.84/km^{2})
- Time zone: UTC−5 (Eastern (EST))
  - Summer (DST): UTC−4 (EDT)
- ZIP codes: 41018
- Area code: 859
- FIPS code: 21-25300
- GNIS feature ID: 2403570
- Website: erlangerky.gov

Erlanger is a city in Kenton County, Kentucky, United States. It had a 2020 census population of 19,611. Erlanger is part of the Cincinnati-Middletown, OH-KY-IN Metropolitan Statistical Area.

== History ==
Erlanger was founded in the 1880s. The city was named after the Parisian family bank Emile Erlanger & Co. and its founder, Baron Frédéric Émile d'Erlanger, who helped finance the town's early development. In current usage, the name is pronounced in an anglicized way, with neither a French nor German accent. Nearby Elsmere was originally known as "South Erlanger".

== Geography ==
According to the United States Census Bureau, the city has a total area of 8.4 square miles (22 km^{2}), of which 8.3 square miles (21 km^{2}) is land and 0.1 square miles (0.26 km^{2}), or 1.19%, is water.

=== Neighborhoods ===
Erlanger has multiple neighborhoods within city limits, such as Cherry Hill (partially in Boone County), Central Erlanger (the section marked between streets Sunset Ave. and Commonwealth Ave.), an industrial area surrounding the Cincinnati Airport (includes Mineola Pike), Historic Erlanger (between Riggs Ave. and Crescent Ave.), Northeast Erlanger (Dixie Hwy. & Stevenson Rd. through Turkeyfoot Rd.), North Central Erlanger (Erlanger Rd. and Riggs Ave. to Rosary Dr.)

== Demographics ==
=== 2020 census ===
As of the 2020 census, Erlanger had a population of 19,611, with 7,830 households and 4,944 families living in the city; the population density was 2,344.6 people per square mile (901.4/km^{2}).

The median age was 37.9 years. 23.8% of residents were under the age of 18, 60.1% were 18 to 64, and 16.1% were 65 years of age or older. For every 100 females there were 95.6 males, and for every 100 females age 18 and over there were 92.0 males age 18 and over.

100.0% of residents lived in urban areas, while 0.0% lived in rural areas.

Of these households, 30.5% had children under the age of 18 living in them. Of all households, 43.6% were married-couple households, 18.9% were households with a male householder and no spouse or partner present, and 28.2% were households with a female householder and no spouse or partner present. About 29.6% of all households were made up of individuals and 11.4% had someone living alone who was 65 years of age or older.

There were 8,249 housing units, of which 5.1% were vacant. The homeowner vacancy rate was 1.4% and the rental vacancy rate was 7.5%.

Racial composition as of the 2020 census
Race	Number	Percentage
White	16,707	85.2%
Black or African American	704	3.6%
American Indian and Alaska Native	65	0.3%
Asian	279	1.4%
Native Hawaiian and Other Pacific Islander	109	0.6%
Some other race	399	2.0%
Two or more races	1,348	6.9%
Hispanic or Latino (of any race)	912	4.7%

=== American Community Survey ===
According to the American Community Survey, for the period of 2020–2024 the estimated median annual income for a household in the city was $75,840, and the median income for a family was $89,559. 13.7% of the population lived under the poverty line, including 20.0% of people under 18, 12.3% of people 18–64, and 9.4% of people 65 or older.

=== 2000 census ===
As of the 2000 census, there were 16,676 people, 6,597 households, and 4,406 families living in the city. The population density was 2,002.4 inhabitants per square mile (773.1/km^{2}). There were 6,865 housing units at an average density of 824.3 per square mile (318.3/km^{2}). The racial makeup of the city was 60% White, 27% African American, 0.02% Native American, 0.04% Asian, 0.02% Pacific Islander, 0.42% from other races, and 1.87% from two or more races. Hispanic or Latino of any race were 10% of the population. A small Mauritanian community is also present.

There were 6,597 households, out of which 51.8% had children under the age of 18 living with them, 32.1% were married couples living together, 33.8% had a female householder with no husband present, and 11.1% were non-families. 28.0% of all households were made up of individuals, and 9.3% had someone living alone who was 65 years of age or older. The average household size was 2.50 and the average family size was 4.09.

Historical population
Census	Pop.	Note	%±
1900	453		—
1910	700		54.5%
1920	711		1.6%
1930	1,853		160.6%
1940	2,416		30.4%
1950	3,694		52.9%
1960	7,072		91.4%
1970	12,676		79.2%
1980	14,466		14.1%
1990	15,979		10.5%
2000	16,676		4.4%
2010	18,082		8.4%
2020	19,611		8.5%
2025 (est.)	20,158		2.8%
U.S. Decennial Census

The age range was 26.4% under the age of 18, 8.7% from 18 to 24, 33.0% from 25 to 44, 20.2% from 45 to 64, and 11.7% who were 65 years of age or older. The median age was 34 years. For every 100 females, there were 92.8 males. For every 100 females age 18 and over, there were 87.8 males.

The median income for a household in the city was $29,835, and the median income for a family was $40,442. Males had a median income of $21,585 versus $19,296 for females. The per capita income for the city was $17,834. About 27.0% of families and 29.8% of the population were below the poverty line, including 42.0% of those under age 18 and 33.6% of those age 65 or over.

== Economy ==
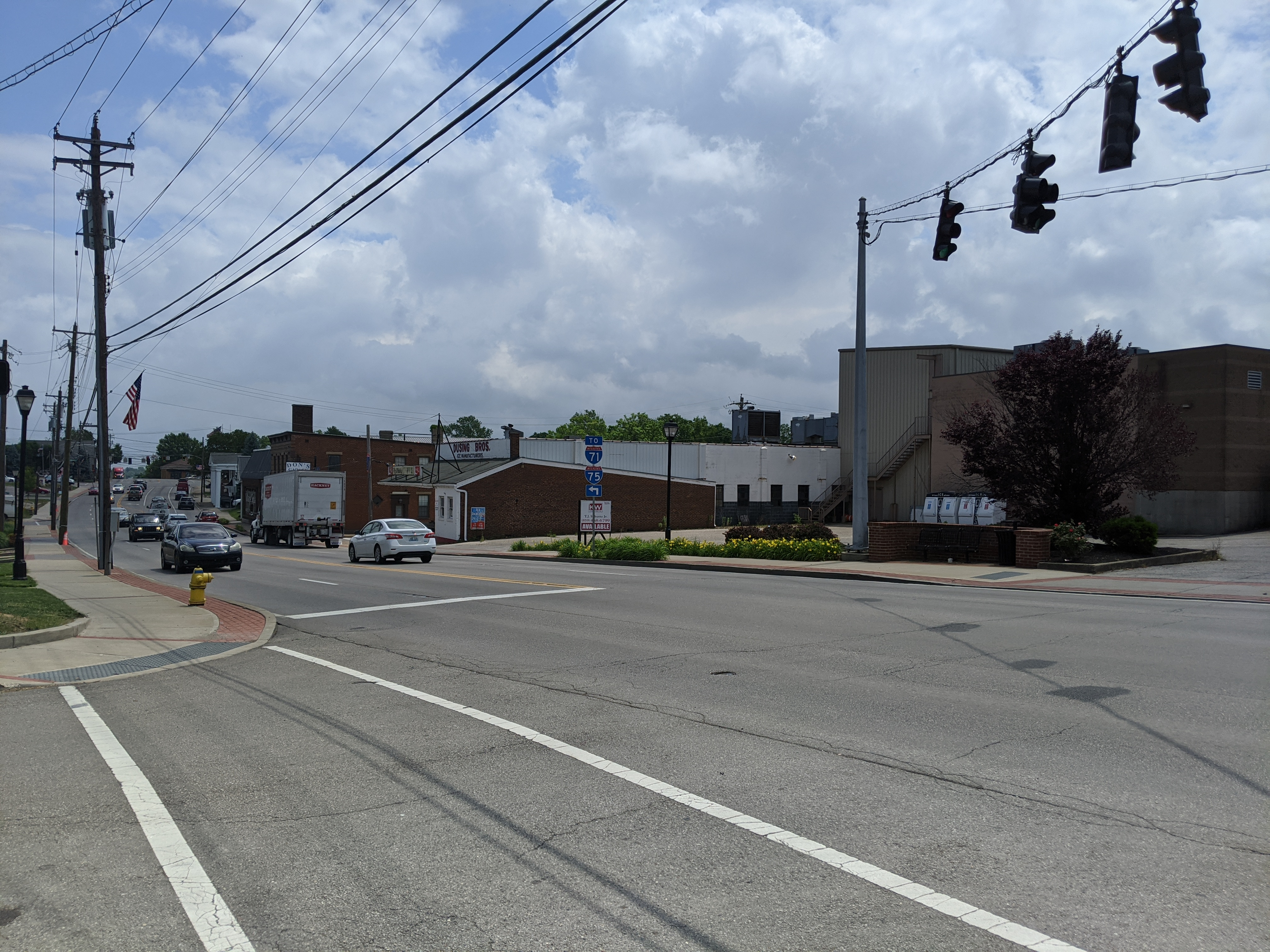
Dixie Highway (US 25/42) in Erlanger

Toyota Boshoku and Perfetti Van Melle, an Italian confectionery, both have business locations in Erlanger, including the factory that manufactures all Airheads.

The United States Playing Card Company's corporate headquarters are also located in the town.

Total Quality Logistics is located here.

In January 2017, Amazon.com announced they would build an Amazon Prime Air hub in Erlanger, and that it would be expected to bring approximately 2,000 new jobs with it, in addition to 10,000 that Amazon already had in Kentucky.

The global shipping center Pitney Bowes, often used to send international purchases, is located in Erlanger.

== Arts and culture ==
Erlanger is served by a branch of the Kenton County Public Library.

== Government ==
Erlanger is a home-rule class city and operates under a Mayor-Council form of government. There are nine elected council members as the legislative body and one elected mayor as the executive authority. The mayor is Jessica Fette, who also served as a councilwoman from 2016 to 2018.

== Education ==
Much of Erlanger and much of its neighbor Elsmere are served by the Erlanger/Elsmere School District, which operates four elementary schools, one middle school, and one high school. Lloyd Memorial High School is the sole comprehensive high school in the Erlanger/Elsmere district.

A portion of Erlanger is in the Kenton County School District.
