= Subterranean fiction =

Subgenre of speculative fiction

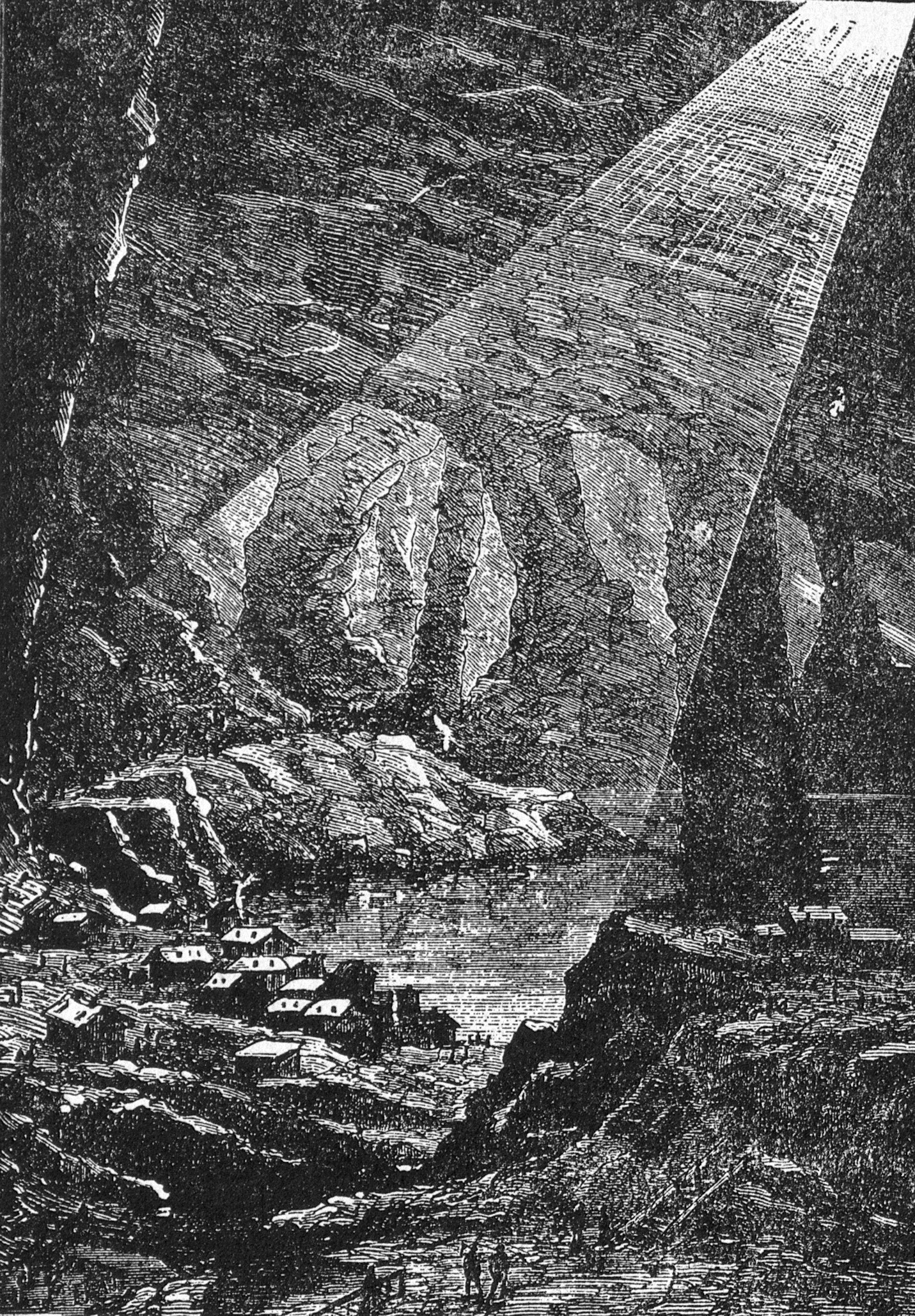
Illustration of a fictional underground town from The Child of the Cavern by Jules Férat.

Subterranean fiction is a subgenre of speculative fiction, which focuses on fictional underground settings, sometimes at the center of the Earth or otherwise deep below the surface. The genre is based on, and has in turn influenced, the Hollow Earth theory. The earliest works in the genre were Enlightenment-era philosophical or allegorical works, in which the underground setting was often largely incidental. In the late 19th century, however, more pseudoscientific or proto-science-fictional motifs gained prevalence. Common themes have included a depiction of the underground world as more primitive than the surface, either culturally, technologically or biologically, or in some combination thereof. The former cases usually see the setting used as a venue for sword-and-sorcery fiction, while the latter often features cryptids or creatures extinct on the surface, such as dinosaurs or archaic humans. A less frequent theme has the underground world much more technologically advanced than the surface one, typically either as the refugium of a lost civilization, or (more rarely) as a secret base for space aliens.

== Literature ==
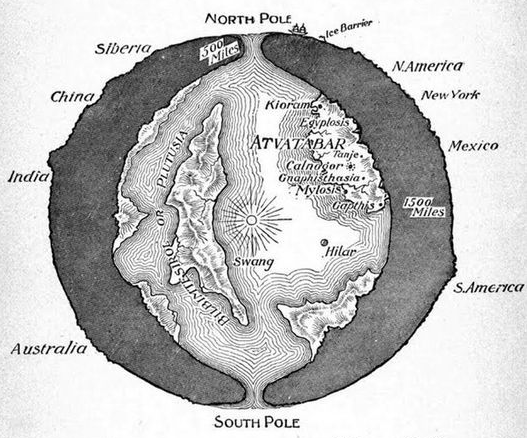
Map of the Interior World, from The Goddess of Atvatabar (1892)

- In Dante Alighieri's Divine Comedy poem Inferno, Hell is a vast cavern and the narrator travels through the center of the Earth and out the other side to Purgatory.
- In Ludvig Holberg's 1741 novel Nicolai Klimii iter subterraneum (Niels Klim's Underground Travels), Nicolai Klim falls through a cave while spelunking and spends several years living on both a smaller globe within and the inside of the outer shell.
- Giacomo Casanova's 1788 Icosaméron is a 5-volume, 1,800-page story of a brother and sister who fall into the Earth and discover the subterranean utopia of the Mégamicres, a race of multicolored, hermaphroditic dwarfs.
- An early science-fiction work called Symzonia: A Voyage of Discovery by a "Captain Adam Seaborn" appeared in print in 1820. In the story, Captain Seaborn leads a group of travelers into the concave inner surface of the Earth. There, they discover an inner continent, which they name Symzonia after John Cleves Symmes, Jr. The story obviously reflected the ideas of Symmes, and some have claimed Symmes as the real author. Other researchers say it deliberately satirized Symmes's ideas, and think they have identified the author as an early American author named Nathaniel Ames (see Lang, Hans-Joachim and Benjamin Lease. "The Authorship of Symzonia: The Case for Nathanial Ames" New England Quarterly, June 1975, page 241–252).
- Faddei Bulgarin's short satirical tale "Improbable Tall-Tale, or Journey to the Center of the Earth" (1825) describes three underworld countries: Ignorantia (populated by spiders), Beastland (populated by apes), and Lightonia (populated by humans, with a capital called Utopia).
- Edgar Allan Poe's nautical science-fiction tales "MS. Found in a Bottle" (1833), The Narrative of Arthur Gordon Pym of Nantucket (1838), and "A Descent into the Maelström" (1841) all feature Hollow Earth elements.
- Although it is often suggested that Jules Verne used the idea of a partially hollow Earth in his 1864 novel Journey to the Center of the Earth, his characters actually descend only 87 miles beneath the surface, where they find an underground sea occupying a cavern roughly the size of Europe.
- Lewis Carroll's 1865 novel Alice's Adventures in Wonderland was originally titled Alice's Adventures Under Ground.
- Edward Bulwer-Lytton's 1871 novel Vril.
- Mary Lane's Mizora (1880–81) combines the hollow-Earth theme with feminism.
- James De Mille's novel A Strange Manuscript Found in a Copper Cylinder, published in 1888 but written prior to the author's death in 1880, depicts a subterranean land with inverted values.
- Pantaletta: A Romance of Sheheland by Mrs. J. Wood (1882)
- George Sand used the idea in her 1884 novel Laura, Voyage dans le Cristal, in which grotesque monsters are found in the interior of the Earth.
- Interior World: A Romance Illustrating a New Hypothesis of Terrestrial Organization by Washington L. Tower (1885)
- Alexandre Saint-Yves d'Alveydre's "Mission de l'Inde en Europe" was published in 1886 as a "true" story about Agartha. He withdrew it from the print and it was released again by Gérard Encausse in 1910.
- John O. Greene's utopia The Ke Whonkus People (1890) describes an 11,000 year-old subterranean civilization at the North Pole, circa 1886, with a "fine climate" and "highly civilized people."
- William R. Bradshaw's science fiction novel The Goddess of Atvatabar (1892) is a utopian fantasy set within the hollow Earth.
- Will N. Harben's Land of the Changing Sun (1894) is a utopian fantasy set within a 100-mile wide cavern found below the Atlantic Ocean 200 years prior and settled. The settlers found the atmosphere very rejuvenating, and also build an artificial changing sun to light their world. Two balloonists, an American and an Englishman, discover this world.
- Etidorhpa (1895) by John Uri Lloyd is set within a hollow Earth.
- In the sociologist Gabriel Tarde's only literary work, Underground Man (1896) (original French title Fragments d'Histoire Future), Humanity escapes a second apocalyptic ice age by delving under the earth and reforming society with Art as its central value.
- Charles Willing Beale's 1899 novel, The Secret of the Earth tells of the adventure of two brothers who build an anti-gravity airship and travel to the hollow Earth. There they find several lost races, and learn that mankind originated in the hollow Earth, but the unruly types were exiled from the hollow Earth. They then exit via the South Pole opening and crash on an island in the South Pacific, from which they send off a log of their adventures which forms the novel.
- The concept was mentioned in Wardon Allan Curtis's 1899 short story "The Monster of Lake LaMetrie".
- In NEQUA or The Problem of the Ages a visit in a sailing ship is made to Altruria, a society inside the earth. This feminist utopian science fiction novel was published in 1900 in Topeka Kansas. Jack Adams listed as the author, was a pseudonym for A. O. Grigsby and Mary P. Lowe, both newspaper publishers.
- An underground Nome Kingdom is featured in several of the Oz books by L. Frank Baum, notably Ozma of Oz (1907), Dorothy and the Wizard in Oz (1908) and Tik-Tok of Oz (1914).
- Willis George Emerson's science-fiction novel The Smoky God (1908) recounts the adventures of one Olaf Jansen who traveled into the interior and found an advanced civilization.
- Edgar Rice Burroughs wrote adventure stories (beginning with At the Earth's Core in 1914) set in the inner world of Pellucidar, including at one point a visit from his character Tarzan. Burroughs's Pellucidar has oceans on the outer surface corresponding to continents on the inner surface and vice versa. Pellucidar is lit by a miniature sun suspended at the center of the hollow sphere, so it is perpetually overhead wherever one is in Pellucidar. The sole exception is the region directly under a tiny geostationary moon of the internal sun; that region as a result is under a perpetual eclipse and is known as the Land of Awful Shadow. This moon has its own life, and hence either has its own atmosphere or shares that of Pellucidar.
- The Russian geologist Vladimir Obruchev uses the concept of the hollow Earth in his 1915 scientific novel Plutonia to take the reader through various geological epochs.
- The World Below by British science fiction author S. Fowler Wright was a major novel of 1929, and important in the history of science-fiction as a bridge between the scientific romance and the pulp era. It is set in the far-future in which Earth's dominant race lives almost entirely underground.
- A deliberately tunneled-out Earth occurs in Charles R. Tanner 1930's SF short story "Tumithak of the Corridors".
- Morgo the Mighty by Sean O'Larkin was serialized in The Popular Magazine in 1930. It featured the adventures of a Tarzanesque character in a network of giant caverns beneath the Himalayas. The caves are ruled by a cowled magician and populated by primitive men, giant intelligent bats, giant warring ants and giant killer chickens.
- Tam, Son of the Tiger by Otis Adelbert Kline from 1931 features the adventures of Tam (another Tarzanesque character) in a subterranean world beneath Asia.
- The novel In Caverns Below (1935) by Stanton A. Coblentz posits an extensive populated network of caverns underlying the Basin and Range province in the North American southwest.
- The novel The Secret People (1935) by John Wyndham features prisoners held captive in a labyrinth of caves by an ancient race of pygmies dwelling beneath the Sahara desert.
- In the Middle-earth books by J.R.R. Tolkien, the kingdom of Angband and its predecessor Utumno are deep underground, under mountains called Ered Engrin; they are home to Orcs, monsters and Morgoth the Dark Lord. Also, the Dwarves and even elves live underground – the underground realms of Moria and Erebor and cities like Nargothrond and Menegroth play a major role in the stories.
- While investigating a haunted mound in Oklahoma, the protagonist of H. P. Lovecraft's novella The Mound discovers a Spanish explorer's account of his travels in a subterranean civilization named K’nyan.
- Richard Sharpe Shaver's The Shaver Mystery stories are about ancient civilizations still living in caverns beneath the Earth surface
- Into a Strange Lost World (1952), a novel for children by Richard Hough (pen name: Bruce Carter), tells the story of two airmen who are shot down during World War II and descend into an underground world.
- C. S. Lewis's 1953 novel The Silver Chair (part of The Chronicles of Narnia) takes place partly in Underland, a subterranean kingdom plotting to conquer Narnia. At one point, the Lady of the Green Kirtle attempts to brainwash the protagonists into believing that the world above ground does not exist.
- The Third Eye (1956) by Tuesday Lobsang Rampa mentions contact with advanced beings living in the center of the Earth.
- The End of the Tunnel (aka The Cave of Cornelius) (1959), by Paul Capon. Four boys in England get trapped in a cave by a landslide, and by following the cave, they encounter a forgotten civilization.
- Dark Universe (1961) by Daniel F. Galouye. A post-apocalyptic science fiction novel where two clans live deep underground and are descendants from humans who escaped an old war.
- City of the First Time (1975) by G.J. Barrett. British survivors of an atomic holocaust venture downward into the Earth through a series of caves and encounter two other races, survivals of previous extinctions.
- Visages Immobiles (1983) by Raymond Abellio. Having discovered that New York was built on top of a massive hollow cavity, an architect devises a plan to build an underground city below Manhattan. The underground setting then becomes the scenario of the apocalyptic battle between a clairvoyant and an international terrorist.
- A Hollow Earth featured in the children's Choose Your Own Adventure novel The Underground Kingdom (1983).
- The history of the Hollow Earth theory is explored in Umberto Eco's 1988 novel Foucault's Pendulum, alongside a wide range of other pseudo-scientific and conspiracy theories.
- Rudy Rucker's novel The Hollow Earth (1990) features Edgar Allan Poe and his ideas. Rucker claims in an afterword to have transcribed the novel from a manuscript in the University of Virginia library; the call number given is that of a copy of Symzonia.
- The Dark Elf Trilogy (1990–1991) by R. A. Salvatore was the first of the Forgotten Realms books to describe the underground world of the Dark Elves called the Underdark. This greatly helped popularize underground settings in fantasy RPGs.
- The novel Indiana Jones and the Hollow Earth by Max McCoy (1997) expands on the legend of an advanced civilization in the Earth's interior.
- Reliquary (1997) by Douglas Preston and Lincoln Child features an underground civilization of humans beneath Manhattan.
- The short story "Black as the Pit, From Pole to Pole" by Howard Waldrop and Steven Utley continues the journey of Frankenstein's creature through a hollow Earth.
- In Jeff Long's 1999 novel The Descent and its 2007 sequel Deeper, a vast labyrinth of tunnels and passages underlying the Earth is inhabited by a brutal species of once-civilized but now degenerate hominid, Homo Hadalis.
- The 2000 novel Abduction by Robin Cook includes the concept of a third world under the sea called "Interterra."
- Eoin Colfer's Artemis Fowl series (2001–2012) focuses on crimes committed by or against the fairy-folk who live beneath the Earth's crust in a technologically advanced society.
- Underland (2002) by Mick Farren has the vampire hero Victor Renquist traveling to a hollow Earth populated by Nazi scientists, subjugated proto-scientific lizard people, and a fungus addicted race of sub-vampires.
- The City of Ember (2003) and its sequels by Jeanne DuPrau describe a city built underground to survive a nuclear holocaust.
- The Underland Chronicles (2003–2007) by Suzanne Collins tells the story of a war between the humans and the rats in a location under New York City called the Underland.
- Tunnels (2005) is the first of a series of books by Roderick Gordon and Brian Williams, taking place in a hollow Earth with an interior sun, in which multiple civilisations exist within and beneath the crust.
- Metro 2033 (2005) and Metro 2034 (2009) by Dmitry Glukhovsky are post-nuclear-apocalyptic novels which describe the last remaining humans fighting to survive in the metro system underneath Moscow with the surface being too irradiated for humans to survive.
- Against the Day (2006) by Thomas Pynchon makes extensive mention of the Earth's interior as a place to be explored, positing inner-Earth seas. Pynchon's Mason & Dixon (1997) also uses the idea of a Hollow Earth as the planet's final holdout for magic against the calculations of the surface's most eminent men of science.
- In Geraldine McCaughrean's The White Darkness (2007), the characters undertake a journey to find a hole into the hollow Earth.
- Neal Shusterman's Downsiders (1999) is a story where a young boy living under New York City in a secret community becomes curious about the topside and adventure ensues.
- John Hodgman's 2008 book More Information Than You Require says the hollow interior of the Earth is the home of the subterranean Molemen. In the center of this Hollow Earth is a small, red sun.
- The Battle of the Labyrinth (2008), the fourth book in Rick Riordan's Percy Jackson and the Olympians series, revolves around the protagonists' attempts to navigate the Labyrinth, a confusing, supernatural maze under the United States.
- The Silo series narrates post-apocalyptic human life in a subterranean city extending one hundred forty-four stories beneath the surface.
- Kameron Hurley's 2017 novel The Stars Are Legion takes place on an alien world with various separate underground societies that the protagonist must work her way through on a long journey back to the surface.

== Comics ==
- A Scrooge McDuck comic book story by Carl Barks called Land Beneath the Ground! (1956) describes an underground world populated by humanoid creatures who create earthquakes.
- The comics series Les Terres Creuses by Belgian comics writers Luc and François Schuiten features several hollow-Earth settings.
- The Hellboy Universe features the Hollow Earth as a major part of its mythology. It was first introduced in the 2002 miniseries B.P.R.D.: Hollow Earth, when the team journeyed into great caverns inside the Earth where they discovered a race of people that had been artificially created by the ancient Hyperboreans.
- One adventure of Alan Moore's Pulp-style hero Tom Strong involved a gateway into the Hollow Earth in the Arctic where Nazis had fled after World War Two only to be devoured by its inhabitants. Much of the story is spent discussing many of the varying Hollow Earth concepts mentioned above. (Tom Strong's Terrific Tales #1)
- In the 1970s, comic-book artist Mike Grell produced the comic-book Warlord, about a pilot who finds himself in Skartaris, a sword-and-sorcery world reached through an opening at the North Pole. First believed to be the hollow interior of the Earth, Skartaris was later revealed to be a parallel dimension.
- The Marvel Comics features several underground empires in Subterranea, with two ruled by Mole Man and Tyrannus.
- The webcomic Overcompensating referenced Hollow Earth theories in an August 2006 strip.
- Super Dinosaur has shown Earth to be a planet with a planet on the inside.
- The webcomic Mare Internum follows the adventures of two scientists trapped in the underworld of Mars.

== Film ==
- The 1935 serial The Phantom Empire combines a western musical with subterranean plot elements loosely adapted from Bulwer-Lytton's The Coming Race.
- The 1951 short feature Superman and the Mole Men postulated a race of little people living inside a hollow Earth. The film was later reconfigured into a two-part TV episode called The Unknown People, with most or all explicit references to "Mole Men" being excised.
- The 1951 film Unknown World is the story of a small crew in a drilling vehicle exploring for a refuge from nuclear war, and finding great caverns at tremendous depths.
- The 1956 film The Mole People has an introduction by Frank C. Baxter ("Dr. Research") explaining the history of Hollow Earth theories.
- The 1959 film Journey to the Center of the Earth is probably the most well known adaptation of Verne's novel.
- The 1960 film The Time Machine is based on the H.G. Wells novel and features underground-dwelling Morlocks.
- The 1970 film Beneath the Planet of the Apes is the second film in the Planet of the Apes series and features an underground city inhabited by mutated humans with psychic powers.
- The 1971 film THX 1138 is an American science fiction film set in a dystopian future in which the populace lives underground and is controlled through android police officers and mandatory use of drugs that suppress emotion, including outlawed sexual desire.
- The 1973 film Godzilla vs. Megalon involves the Seatopians, an underground civilization that sends Megalon to destroy the surface world in response to earthquakes caused by underground nuclear testing damaging their kingdom.
- The 1976 film At the Earth's Core is based on Burroughs' novel.
- The 1984 film What Waits Below depicts the discovery of a lost race of albino-skinned beings.
- The 1999 film "The Matrix" features the underground refuge of Zion.
- The 2001 animated film Atlantis: The Lost Empire, Atlantis is located underwater and underground.
- In the 2003 film The Core, a team drills to the center of the Earth to restart the rotation of the Earth's core.
- The 2004 Japanese horror film Marebito, directed by Takashi Shimizu, references the Hollow Earth hypothesis.
- The 2008 film Journey to the Center of the Earth has the protagonists Professor Trevor Anderson, his nephew Sean Anderson, and a volcanologist's daughter ending up at the center of the Earth after traversing a mine system. Unlike the book, the "Center of the Earth" is thousands of miles beneath the Earth's surface and is an air pocket surrounded by hot lava causing the location to easily hit 200 degrees during certain volcanic activities above it.
- The 2008 film from The Asylum called Journey to the Center of the Earth (also called Journey to Middle Earth) features an underground prehistoric ecosystem.
- The 2008 film City of Ember is the survival story of a fantasy underground city.
- The 2009 film Ice Age: Dawn of the Dinosaurs features an underground world where dinosaurs survived into the Holocene.
- The 2011 anime film Children Who Chase Lost Voices features a party's journey to Agartha.
- The 2013 anime film Patema Inverted features a civilization that lives in a system of tunnels and caverns deep underground.
- The 2019 animated film How to Train Your Dragon: The Hidden World features the "hidden world," an underground world inhabited by Dragons and accessible by a caldera in the ocean.
- Hollow Earth is a major plot element of the MonsterVerse film franchise. The 2017 film Kong: Skull Island places Skull Island atop an entryway into Hollow Earth that is responsible for its population of giant monsters and plant/animal hybrids. The 2019 film Godzilla: King of the Monsters reveals the existence of a Hollow Earth with portals that Godzilla uses as shortcuts to move faster around the globe. The 2021 film Godzilla vs. Kong features an expedition into Hollow Earth to harness a mysterious energy source and find Kong's ancestral home. Due to a strong reverse-gravitational effect, Apex Cybernetics has developed HEAVs, specialized crafts that can withstand the pressure exerted by the gravity field.
- The 2019 film Iron Sky: The Coming Race is a Finnish-German comic science fiction action film directed by Timo Vuorensola.

== Television ==
- In the Tiny Toon Adventures episode "Journey to the Center of Acme Acres", a series of earthquakes shake up the city, causing Plucky and Hamton to fall into a crater in the ground. They fall for hours before finally reaching the center, which is hollow.
- In the Teenage Mutant Ninja Turtles episode "Turtles at the Earth's Core", the Turtles discover a cavern on Earth inhabited by dinosaurs.
- The main antagonists of Inhumanoids are giant monsters who originate from a subterranean world, and the protagonists regularly travel underground to battle against them.
- The Spider Riders series of books and anime take place in an "Inner World" inhabited by humans, cybernetic battle spiders, and intelligent insects.
- Cleopatra 2525
- The anime series Gurren Lagann is initially set in an underground civilization due to the surface of the world being ruled by Lordgenome.
- Transformers: Cybertron features a character, Professor Lucy Suzuki, who believes in the Hollow Earth Theory.
- The Japanese anime Gaiking: Legend of Daiku-Maryu has the protagonists spend much of their time in a hollow Earth called Darius, home of an empire of humanoids that are currently amassing a force to invade and conquer the surface world.
- The French series Les Mondes Engloutis (known in English as Spartakus and the Sun Beneath the Sea) involves protagonists descending through a maze of caves into a subterranean world of different space and time, inhabited by various peoples.
- Sanctuary has a Season 3 storyline that deals with Helen Magnus and her team finding and visiting Hollow Earth.
- In Detentionaire, the main antagonist of the series known as "His Eminence" is from a long-lost race of reptilian humanoids who retreated beneath the earth and lay dormant for thousands of years.
- In Doctor Who Series 5 (2010), episodes 8 and 9 The Hungry Earth and Cold Blood take place in an underground city populated by Silurians, a humanoid reptilian race who have been hibernating for millions of years and want to have their planet back from the "ape descended primitives" who have evolved and taken over (i.e. humankind). The Silurians and their aquatic cousins the Sea Devils also appeared in the original run of Doctor Who - in Doctor Who and the Silurians (1970), The Sea Devils (1972) and Warriors of the Deep (1984).
- The Justice League Unlimited episode "Chaos at the Earth's Core" features the location Skartaris from DC's Warlord comics.
- The animated television series Billy Dilley's Super-Duper Subterranean Summer takes place in an underground world called Subterranea-Tania, which the main characters get trapped due to a science project gone awry.
- The President Curtis episode "Hollow" features Hollow Earth, which is inhabited by the Daboo, Moss People, Mushroom People, and Nickel People.

== Games ==
- The interactive fiction computer games in the Zork series (1977–1982) are set in the Great Underground Empire.
- The 1990 Dungeons & Dragons Hollow World Campaign Set details the eponymous Hollow World as part of the Mystara campaign setting.
- The 1991 video game Final Fantasy IV for the Super Nintendo Entertainment System (Released as "Final Fantasy II" in the United States) features a subterranean world that is inhabited by dwarves.
- The 1992 video game Ultima Underworld: The Stygian Abyss is set in a large cave system that contains the remnants of a failed utopian civilization.
- The 1993 roleplaying game Mage: The Ascension features the Hollow Earth as an alternate reality, inaccessible without magic in the modern age because people no longer believe the Earth could be hollow.
- The 1993 video game series Myst, the D'ni civilization lies in a large cavern under the U.S. state of New Mexico.
- The 1994 video game EarthBound for the Super Nintendo Entertainment System features the so-called "Lost Underworld" which resembles a prehistoric jungle in which dinosaurs live.
- The 1995 video game Terranigma for the Super Nintendo Entertainment System features both a hollow and normal Earth.
- The 2000 video game series Avernum, and its predecessor, Exile (1995), the nation is based in a cavern system once used as a penal colony.
- The 2001 role-playing video game King's Field IV released in North America as King's Field: the Ancient City takes place predominantly in the Ancient City, an underground domain in the land of Heladin which has been stricken by darkness since their king received a strange idol. The player is tasked with venturing further and further downwards exploring much of the subterranean city in its decay and desolation.
- The 2001 real time strategy game Pikmin, features a large cave called the Forest Navel, while being underground there is a single hole at the top to enter. The sequel, Pikmin 2 (2004), has the main characters delving into 14 caverns for treasure.
- The 2002 video game Arx Fatalis, takes place almost entirely in an underground setting.
- The 2002 video game Breath of Fire: Dragon Quarter is set entirely in an underground world, where the main characters try to reach the surface.
- The 2006 pulp roleplaying game Hollow Earth Expedition.
- The 2026 video game Gears of War: E-Day is set on the fictional Hollow Earth planet, Sera as a prequel to 2006's Gears of War. The humans of Sera live on the surface while the vast underground caverns called the Hollows were home to other native species and the Locust Horde, which launched a full scale global war against humanity and invaded the surface on Emergence Day.
- The 2008 video game Subterranean Animism, the 11th video game in the Touhou Project series, revolves around the main character descending underground into the depths of Hell in order to stop a possible apocalyptic event from occurring.
- The 2008 MMO video game, Aion: Tower of Eternity, the world of Atreia used to be a hollow planet with the Tower inside it, connecting the northern and southern hemispheres together, providing light and heat to the creatures living inside of the planet.
- The 2009 browser-based game Fallen London, as well as its roguelike spin-off Sunless Sea, are set in an alternate history in which Victorian London is now located a mile beneath the surface, in an enormous cavern colloquially referred to as the "Neath" dominated by a large subterranean ocean.
- The 2009 tabletop game, Pathfinder Roleplaying Game's main setting, Golarion, features an extensive underworld known as the Darklands. The deepest region of the Darklands, known as Orv, consists of a series of caverns (referred to as Vaults) roughly the size of surface nations, home to a variety of alien environments, creatures and cultures.
- The 2009 video game Dragon Age: Origins features an underground city by the name of Orzammar
- The 2011 video game The Elder Scrolls V: Skyrim features an underground city by the name of Blackreach with large glowing mushrooms and a large "sun" hanging from the ceiling, Blackreach connects the Dwemer cities: Alftand, Mzinchaleft, and Raldbthar which are also underground and feature large amounts of Steampunk technology.
- The 2011 sandbox video game Minecraft features remnants of forgotten civilizations hidden deep within the earth, such as the Stronghold and the Ancient City. Furthermore, there exists a dimension in the game called the Nether, largely considered to be located below the Overworld. Here, there exist derelict structures such as Bastion Remnants and Nether Fortresses, along with the Piglins, a race of sentient, humanoid pig creatures.
- The 2012 MMORPG The Secret World, the Hollow Earth serves as a central hub allowing the player to travel between the different area of the outer world. In the 2017 reboot, Secret World Legends, Hollow Earth is a central place for trade, meetup and services.
- The 2013 unreleased RPG Deep Down focuses on deep diving into an ancient civilization below the earth to discover its secrets while using powerful abilities and a dynamic lighting system to survive its deep dank depths while also combating terrifying grimdark foes such as an ancient dragon like the one shown in the 2013 Tokyo Game Show Trailer.
- The 2015 video game Undertale, the main character falls into the Underground, a subterranean realm which serves as the setting for the game. The Underground is populated with a society of monsters who were banished there by humans.
- The 2015 role-playing game Underrail is set in a distant future, where life on Earth's surface has long since been made impossible and the remnants of humanity now dwell in a vast system of metro station-states.
- The 2017 Metroidvania game Hollow Knight takes place on Hallownest, a ruined kingdom built inside a vast series of interconnected caverns, presenting lakes, lush caves and forgotten cities, among other various areas.
- The 2023 video game The Legend of Zelda: Tears of the Kingdom contains a dark underground area named the Depths, whose terrain mirrors the surface in inverse.
- The 2023 video game STASIS: BONE TOTEM plays in underwater caves and features a Subterranean Mesoamerican culture prominently.
- The 2025 video game Donkey Kong Bananza has Donkey Kong traveling through the layers of a vast underground world to journey to the planet core and stop VoidCo from claiming the Banandium Root, which can grant wishes.

== Music ==
- Japanese psychedelic rock band Far East Family Band named their 1975 debut album Chikyu Kudo Setsu, (Hollow Earth Theory), although the official English title was The Cave Down to Earth. The album's sleeve notes refer to familiar stories of entrances at the north and south poles, and of an ancient civilisation dwelling inside the Earth with connections to UFOs.
- The band Bal-Sagoth has, on their album The Chthonic Chronicles (2006), a song about the hollow Earth called "Invocations Beyond the Outer-World Night".
- Sunn O))) on their album Monoliths & Dimensions has a song called "Aghartha".
- In Coldplay's first full album Parachutes there is a song called "Spies". It may refer to a subterranean location, but the lyrics themselves are ambiguous.
- Science Babble, on their album Membrane has a song "Rock Bottom" revolving around hollow Earth theory.

== Other celestial bodies ==
Subsurface fiction may also be set on other planetary bodies:

- The most common example of a hollow body other than Earth has historically been a hollow Moon. A breathable interior atmosphere allowed various SF writers to postulate lunar life (including intelligent life) in spite of scientific observations of the uninhabitability of the Lunar surface. The subgenre largely died out following the actual Moon landings.
- The console Strategy/RPG series Super Robot Wars features a Hollow Earth world named La Gias.
- The role-playing video game Septerra Core takes place on an eponymous world with seven separate layers, similar to the theory of Edmund Halley.
- The PC Adventure game Torin's Passage features a depiction of the hollow fictional planet Strata, similar to the one described by Edmund Halley.
- The planet Naboo in Star Wars has a "hollow core", but it is filled with water.
- In the 1968 Star Trek: The Original Series episode "For the World Is Hollow and I Have Touched the Sky", there is a hollow, artificially created, planet-shaped spaceship whose inhabitants falsely believe that they are living on the surface of a planet.
- "World Without Stars", the third volume of the French graphic space novel series Valérian: Spatio-Temporal Agent takes place mainly inside a hollow planet inhabited by a matriarchal and a patriarchal culture continuously at war with each other.

== See also ==
- Dyson sphere
- Earth in science fiction
- Gravity train
- Travel to the Earth's center
