= -logy =

English language suffix

-logy is a suffix in the English language, used with words originally adapted from Ancient Greek ending in -λογία (-logía). The earliest English examples were copied or borrowed of the French -logie, which was in turn inherited from the Latin -logia. The suffix became productive in English from the 18th century, allowing the formation of new terms with no Latin or Greek precedent.

The English suffix has two separate main senses, reflecting two sources of the -λογία suffix in Greek:

- a combining form used in the names of school or bodies of knowledge, e.g., theology (loaned from Latin in the 14th century) or sociology. In words of the type theology, the suffix is derived originally from -λογ- (-log-) (a variant of -λεγ-, -leg-), from the Greek verb λέγειν (legein, 'to speak'). The suffix has the sense of "the character or deportment of one who speaks or treats of [a certain subject]", or more succinctly, "the study of [a certain subject]". (The Ancient Greek noun λόγος lógos mentioned below can also be translated, among other things, as "subject matter".)
- the root word nouns that refer to kinds of speech, writing or collections of writing, e.g., eulogy or trilogy. In words of this type, the "-logy" element is derived from the Greek noun λόγος (logos, 'speech', 'account', 'story'). The suffix has the sense of "[a certain kind of] speaking or writing".

Philology is an exception: while its meaning is closer to the first sense, the etymology of the word is similar to the second sense.

== -logy versus -ology ==
In English names for fields of study, the suffix -logy is most frequently found preceded by the euphonic connective vowel o so that the word ends in -ology. In these Greek words, the root is always a noun and -o- is the combining vowel for all declensions of Greek nouns. However, when new names for fields of study are coined in modern English, the formations ending in -logy almost always add an -o-, except when the root word ends in an "l" or a vowel, as in these exceptions: analogy, dekalogy, disanalogy, genealogy, genethlialogy, hexalogy; herbalogy (a variant of herbology), mammalogy, mineralogy, paralogy, petralogy (a variant of petrology); elogy; heptalogy; antilogy, festilogy; trilogy, tetralogy, pentalogy; palillogy, pyroballogy; dyslogy; eulogy; and brachylogy. Linguists sometimes jokingly refer to haplology as haplogy (subjecting the word haplology to the process of haplology itself).

== Additional usage as a suffix ==
Per metonymy, words ending in -logy are sometimes used to describe a subject rather than the study of it (e.g., technology). This usage is particularly widespread in medicine; for example, pathology is often used simply to refer to "the disease" itself (e.g., "We haven't found the pathology yet") rather than "the study of a disease".

Books, journals, and treatises about a subject also often bear the name of this subject (e.g., the scientific journal Ecology).

When appended to other English words, the suffix can also be used humorously to create nonce words (e.g., beerology as "the study of beer"). As with other classical compounds, adding the suffix to an initial word-stem derived from Greek or Latin may be used to lend grandeur or the impression of scientific rigor to humble pursuits, as in cosmetology ("the study of beauty treatment") or cynology ("the study of dog training").

== Compound series of works of art ==
The -logy or -ology suffix is commonly used to indicate finite series of art works like books or movies. For paintings, the "tych" suffix is more common (e.g. diptych, triptych). Examples include:

- Trilogy for three works
- Tetralogy for four works
- Pentalogy for five works
- Hexalogy for six works
- Heptalogy for seven works

Further terms like duology (two, mostly in genre fiction) quadrilogy (four) and octalogy (eight) have been coined but are rarely used: for a series of 10, sometimes "decalog" is used (e.g. in the Virgin Decalog) instead of "decalogy".

== See also ==
- Classical compound
- Suffixes
