= Car Trouble =

Car Trouble may refer to:

== Books ==
- Car Trouble (Jeanne DuPrau novel), 2005

== Film and television ==
- Car Trouble (film), 1986 film starring Julie Walters
- "Car Trouble" (Don't Wait Up), a 1983 television episode
- "Car Trouble", a 2019 episode of Big City Greens
- "Car Trouble", a 2003 episode of Kim Possible
- "Car Trouble", a 1998 episode of Malcolm & Eddie
- "Car Trouble", a 2003 episode of Teen Titans

== Music ==
=== Songs ===
- "Car Trouble" by Adam and the Ants from the album Dirk Wears White Sox (1979)
- "Car Trouble" by Owl City from the album Coco Moon (2023)
- "Car Trouble" by J-Live from the EP Always Will Be (2003)
- "Car Trouble" by Ennio Morricone from the soundtrack to The Secret of the Sahara (1973)
- "Car Trouble" by Jerry Goldsmith from the soundtrack to Looney Tunes: Back in Action (2003)
- "Car Trouble" by All Girl Summer Fun Band
- "Car Trouble" by Thomas Newman from the film Pay It Forward (2000)
- "Car Trouble" by HammerFall
- "Car Trouble" by The Jerky Boys from Best of the Jerky Boys (2002)
- "Car Trouble" by Alicia Myers from Alicia Again (1981)
