= Gil Kenan =

Israeli, English, and American filmmaker (born 1976)

- גיל קינן
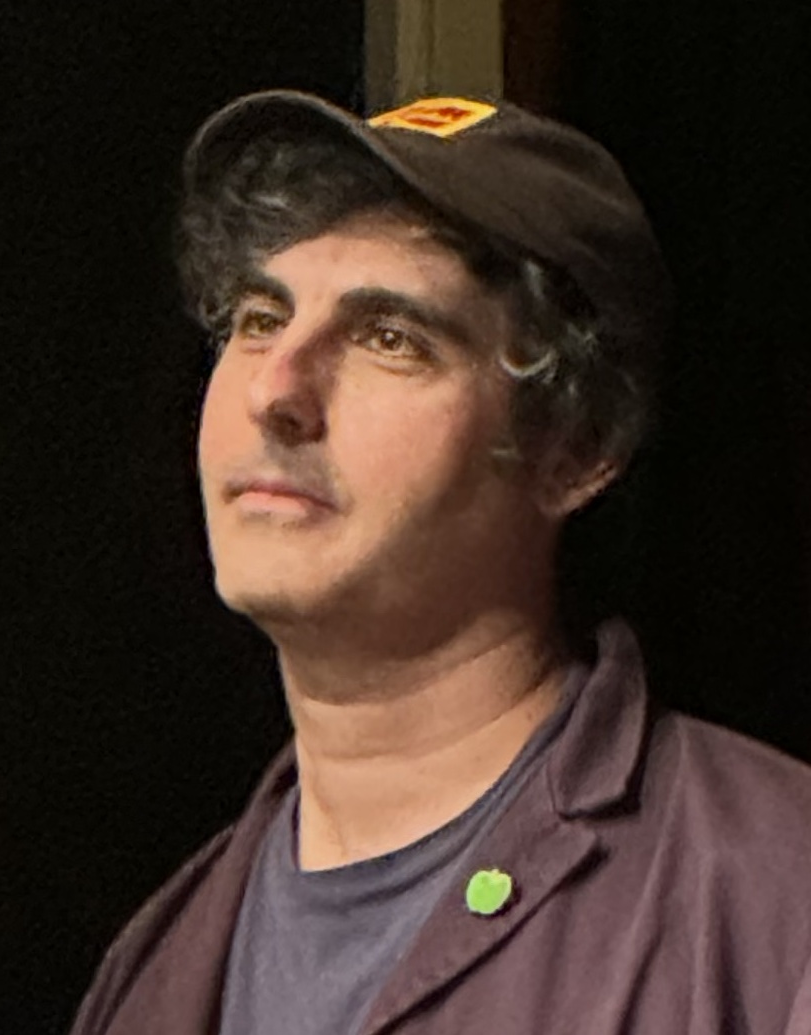
- Kenan in 2024
- Born: October 16, 1976 (age 50); London, England
- Education: University of California, Los Angeles (MFA)
- Occupations: Film director; screenwriter; producer
- Years active: 2002–present
- Spouse: Eliza Chaikin (m. 2005)

Gil Kenan (Hebrew: גיל קינן; born October 16, 1976) is an English, Israeli, and American filmmaker. He is best known for directing Monster House (2006), City of Ember (2008), Poltergeist (2015), A Boy Called Christmas (2021), and Ghostbusters: Frozen Empire (2024). He has frequently collaborated with filmmaker Jason Reitman. Kenan also earned an Academy Award nomination for Monster House, which was his directorial debut.

== Early life ==
Kenan was born in London to a Jewish family. When Kenan was three, his family immigrated to Tel Aviv, Israel. He has one brother. At age eight, Kenan and his family once again moved to Reseda, Los Angeles.

Kenan studied at the film division of the University of California, Los Angeles where he received a Master of Fine Arts degree in animation in 2002. For his graduate thesis, he created a 10-minute stop-motion/live-action short film, The Lark.

== Career ==
The first public screening of The Lark caught the attention of Jordan Bealmear, who was an assistant at Creative Artists Agency. The agency sent hundreds of copies of Kenan's short in order to interest parties in the film industry and after a few months of interviews, Robert Zemeckis offered Kenan the director's chair for his first feature, Monster House (2006). Executive produced by Zemeckis and Steven Spielberg, it was nominated for that year's Academy Award for Best Animated Feature, losing to Happy Feet.

Kenan followed Monster House with City of Ember, a post-apocalyptic science fiction adventure film based on Jeanne DuPrau's 2003 novel of the same name. Produced by Tom Hanks, it was released in October 2008 to mixed reviews and poor box office results. Kenan's next film, Poltergeist, a remake of the 1982 Tobe Hooper film of the same name, was released in May 2015. In July of that same year, Kenan signed on to direct and co-write a film adaptation of the popular video game series Five Nights at Freddy's by Scott Cawthon, but later withdrew from the project. Kenan also co-wrote and directed the Christmas fantasy film A Boy Called Christmas, and was released on Netflix in 2021. In 2019, Kenan co-wrote a script along with Jason Reitman for Ghostbusters: Afterlife, which is a direct sequel to Ghostbusters and Ghostbusters II, was released in 2021. After the film's success, he and Reitman formed a production company Reitman/Kenan Productions and signed an overall deal with Sony Pictures Entertainment to develop more projects. He was later chosen to direct the 2024 film Ghostbusters: Frozen Empire, a sequel to Ghostbusters: Afterlife, replacing Reitman, who instead became a producer and was a co-writer of the film with Kenan.

== Influences ==
Kenan has cited David Lynch, Richard Elfman, Lotte Reiniger, Zbigniew Rybczyński, and Alfred Hitchcock as influences; he once met with Elfman. Among his favorite movies and short films, Kenan has listed Eraserhead, Forbidden Zone and Tango, as all three influenced Kenan's short The Lark. He first became aware of a director's own style while watching Terry Gilliam's Time Bandits and appreciated Gilliam's point of view as well as that of Steven Spielberg in his 1980s films, leading him to respect a film's craft and storytelling.

== Personal life ==
In 2005, Kenan married Eliza Chaikin, who was an art director on City of Ember.

== Filmography ==
Short film

Year	Title	Director	Writer
2002	The Lark	Yes	Yes

Feature film

Year	Title	Director	Writer	Producer	Notes
2006	Monster House	Yes	No	No	
2008	City of Ember	Yes	No	No	
2015	Poltergeist	Yes	No	No	
2021	Ghostbusters: Afterlife	No	Yes	Executive	
2021	A Boy Called Christmas	Yes	Yes	No	
2024	Ghostbusters: Frozen Empire	Yes	Yes	Executive	Also voiced Garraka
2024	Saturday Night	No	Yes	Yes	

Television

Year	Title	Notes
2016	Scream	Episode "Village of the Damned"

== Awards and nominations ==
Year	Award	Category	Nominated work	Result	Ref.
2006	Academy Awards	Best Animated Feature	Monster House	Nominated	
2006	Annie Awards	Outstanding Achievement for Directing in a Feature Production	Monster House	Nominated	
2024	Denver Film Festival	5280 Award	Saturday Night	Won	
2024	Astra Film and Creative Arts Awards	Best Original Screenplay	Saturday Night	Nominated	
2024	St. Louis Film Critics Association	Original Screenplay	Saturday Night	Won	
