= Paul Preuss =

Paul Preuss may refer to:

- Paul Preuss (author) (born 1942), American writer of science fiction and science articles
- Paul Preuss (climber) (1886–1913), Austrian alpinist
