= Hexalogy =

Literary work made up of six distinct works

A hexalogy (from Greek ἑξα- hexa-, "six" and -λογία -logia, "discourse") is a compound literary or narrative work that is made up of six distinct works. The word apparently first appeared in English as a borrowing from German, in discussions of August Bungert's Wagnerian opera cycle entitled Homerische Welt based on the Iliad and the Odyssey. (He planned two tetralogies, but the third and fourth operas of the eight were never written.) Both pentalogie and hexalogie were used by Théophile Gautier in 1859. In 1923 the word was applied by an American reviewer to Johannes V. Jensen's The Long Journey.

== Examples ==
Examples of works that have been described as hexalogies are as follows:

Hexalogy	Dates	Author	Medium
Der Biberpelz and Der rote Hahn	1893–1901	Gerhart Hauptmann	Two three-act plays
The Long Journey	1908–1922	Johannes V. Jensen	Novels
Aus dem bürgerlichen Heldenleben	1911–1922	Carl Sternheim	Plays
The Four Winds of Love	1937–1945	Compton Mackenzie	Novels
Fortunes of War	1960–1980	Olivia Manning	Novels
Original Dune saga	1965–1985	Frank Herbert	Novels
Os Karas	1984–2014	Pedro Bandeira	Novels
Luv(Sic) Hexalogy	2001–2015	Nujabes and Shing02	Music
Tunnels	2007–2013	Roderick Gordon and Brian Williams	Novels
Mortal Instruments	2007–2014	Cassandra Clare	Novels
Min Kamp	2009–2011	Karl Ove Knausgård	Novels
The School for Good and Evil	2013–2020	Soman Chainani	Novels
Heartstopper	2016–2018	Alice Oseman	Graphic novels
Spellslinger	2017–2019	Sebastien de Castell	Novels

== Films ==
- Ultraseven 1999 The Final Chapters Hexalogy (1999)
- Final Destination (2000–2025)
- Scary Movie (2000–2026)
- Ice Age (2002–2027)
- Tinker Bell (2008–2015)
- Home Alone (1990–2021)
- Wrong Turn (2003–2014)
- Sharknado (2013–2018)
- Herbie (1968–2005)
- Insidious (2011-2026)

== Video games ==
- Mega Man for the NES (1987–1994)
- Mega Man Battle Network (Game Boy Advance) (2002–2007)
- BIT.TRIP (WiiWare) (2009–2011)

== See also ==
- List of feature film series with six entries
- Heptalogy
