= Darkhold (disambiguation) =

The Darkhold is a grimoire in the Marvel Universe.

Darkhold may also refer to:

- Darkhold (Marvel Cinematic Universe)
- Castle Darkhold, a location in Forgotten Realms

== See also ==
- The Diamond of Darkhold, a 2008 novel by Jeanne DuPrau
