= The People of Sparks =

2004 novel by Jeanne DuPrau

- First edition cover
- Author: Jeanne DuPrau
- Language: English
- Series: The Book of Ember series
- Genre: Children's literature, post-apocalyptic, Science fiction
- Publisher: Random House/Yearling
- Publication date: May 25, 2004
- Publication place: United States, Canada
- Media type: Print (hardcover and paperback)
- Pages: 346
- ISBN: 0-375-82824-9
- OCLC: 53932528
- LC Class: PZ7.D927 Pe 4
- Preceded by: The City of Ember
- Followed by: The Prophet of Yonwood

The People of Sparks is a post-apocalyptic science fiction novel by American writer Jeanne DuPrau, published in 2004. It is the sequel to The City of Ember (2003) and the second "Book of Ember" in the series. It was followed by The Prophet of Yonwood (2006) and The Diamond of Darkhold (2008).

The Playtone Company, the production company that released the City of Ember film, also purchased the film rights to The People of Sparks, but after the box office failure of the first film, plans for the sequel were shelved.

== Plot summary ==
The story resumes after the evacuation of Ember, an underground city, which has been cut off from the surface for more than 200 years. The refugees from the city cannot return, as the city's resources are nearly depleted, and have no idea how to survive on the surface. After following a road for three days, they arrive at the village of Sparks, exhausted and hungry. The village leaders, Mary, Ben, and Wilmer, reluctantly agree to take in the refugees for 6 months, theoretically long enough to teach them to survive independently. They are allowed to stay in the abandoned and decrepit Pioneer Hotel. Tick Hassler, a former hauler of carts in Ember, organizes a series of projects intended to improve their quality of life and chances for the future, but which tend to be more grandiose than practical.

Concern soon arises about whether there is adequate food for everyone in Sparks; if food stocks are insufficient for the winter, it would be disastrous for both groups. The Emberites have little knowledge of the surface, and their ignorance annoys the people of Sparks. Torren, an unhappy boy from Sparks, destroys a large amount of tomatoes in a furious rage, and then accuses Doon, an Emberite, of the act, to further build hatred between the two people. Vandalism against the people of Ember heightens the anger on both sides. The resultant reduction in the quality and quantity of food provided to Emberites only makes them angrier. Sparks' leaders vote to stop having Emberites in homes for meals, as was the policy before, and instead have them pick up food to eat elsewhere. Then, Ember's people learn that they will be evicted from the village in the middle of winter, which they had not understood.

Meanwhile, Lina leaves with a roamer who travels to old cities to find treasure, hoping to find the city she has been dreaming of and drawing. There she finds not a beautiful city like she expected, but a crumbling ruin of a metropolis (San Francisco after the Disaster). She returns to Sparks after more than a month, disappointed, and is very surprised by the deteriorating political situation.

After the people from Ember are deliberately inflicted with itchy rashes by an unknown person, at a time of extreme heat, angry Emberites start to gather in the town square. Tick Hassler urges them to attack the market stalls, seize food, and run, which some of them do. That evening, the village leaders meet and vote to order all former citizens of Ember to leave immediately. Tick organizes a group of Emberites to fight back if the people of Sparks try to make them leave by force or continue to deprive them of adequate food.

In the morning, this group enters the large square, followed by the rest of the people of Ember. Ben, who voted to order them to leave, brings the "Terrible Weapon", which is a machine gun built before the Disaster, from the town hall basement. Ben threatens to 'fire' on them, but Tick and his men charge at the weapon, not knowing what it is. When Ben tries to shoot them, Mary forces him to fire over the crowd by kicking the front upward. As Ben tries to lower it and shoot at the crowd, the age and poor storage of the cannon and its ammunition cause it to explode. The explosion starts a fire, which engulfs a large tree in front of the town hall and threatens to destroy numerous buildings. The Emberites watch passively as the people of Sparks try to extinguish the fire: some hope for the fire to spread, but most of them are simply too afraid, of the fire and their fellow Emberites, to do anything.

At this point, Lina decides to help the people of Sparks fight the fire. As this happens, Doon sees that Torren is trapped in the burning tree by the building and saves him before he catches fire. These acts cause most of the people of Ember to gradually join the firefighting efforts, until the fire is extinguished.

This turns around the spiral of resentment, and it is discovered that Tick perpetrated the vandalism against the Emberites to gain support, and the tomato incident is resolved. The two groups decide to cooperate, with Mary declaring that "we are all the people of Sparks". Doon manages to construct a simple electric circuit, based on a science book found amongst the books piled in a room in the village's storehouse.

== Reception ==
A review by Publishers Weekly noted that this second book shifted the focus of the story onto a different set of characters, but that the novel contained a positive message.
