= Core (novel) =

- First ed. cover
- Author: Paul Preuss
- Language: English
- Genre: Science fiction
- Publisher: William Morrow and Company
- Publication date: 1993 (first edition)
- Publication place: United States
- Media type: Print
- Pages: 350 p.
- ISBN: 068809662X
- OCLC: 27429206

Core is a science fiction novel by author Paul Preuss. First published in August 1993, it is about a group of scientists who attempt to fix a problem with the Earth's magnetic field. While it does not involve the scientists making a literal trip to the core of the Earth, one of the characters does actually visit the mantle. The novel was loosely adapted into the film The Core.

== Synopsis ==
The Earth's magnetic field suffers a reversal and a group of scientists work to solve the problem by drilling a borehole to access, study, and eventually "fix" the core remotely. Side plots include connections to the Manhattan Project and geo-terrorism.

== Reception ==
Kirkus Reviews gave it a positive review, calling it a "fascinating scientific-technical spectacle, and never mind the tepid romancing, humdrum father-son clashes, and generally creaky plot."
