= The Prophet of Yonwood =

2006 novel by Jeanne DuPrau

- First edition cover
- Author: Jeanne DuPrau
- Language: English
- Series: The Book of Ember series
- Genre: Young adult, Science fiction novel
- Publisher: Random House
- Publication date: May 9, 2006
- Publication place: United States
- Media type: Print (hardcover and paperback)
- Pages: 289
- ISBN: 0-375-87526-3
- OCLC: 61295777
- LC Class: PZ7.D927 Pro 2006
- Preceded by: The People of Sparks
- Followed by: The Diamond of Darkhold

The Prophet of Yonwood is an apocalyptic science fiction novel by Jeanne DuPrau, published in 2006. It is the third "Book of Ember" of the series, and a prequel to The City of Ember. It is set about fifty years before the Disaster and the establishment of Ember, and approximately three hundred years before the events of The City of Ember, The People of Sparks and The Diamond of Darkhold.

== Plot ==
A young girl named Nickie is traveling with her Aunt Crystal to an old house in Yonwood, North Carolina. Nickie's great-grandfather has died, and the house where he lived, in a neighborhood called Greenhaven, is inherited by Crystal, who plans to sell it. Over time, Nickie begins to love the house and finds a girl named Amanda, who used to look after Arthur Green, and her dog, Otis, living in the house without her and Crystal's previous knowledge.

In Yonwood, there is a Prophet named Althea Tower who has a prophetic vision of the world in burning flames and smoke, and subsequently spends months in a dream-like semi-conscious state, in which she mutters phrases and words. Her friend, Brenda Beeson claims that these phrases were instructions from God and requires townspeople to comply with her interpretation of the words, and insists that the entire city quit their "sinful" ways and start to be good people, so God would be with them during the end times. Brenda essentially becomes the town's dictator, directing the police in the town to enforce the "war against evil" and slaps buzzing bracelets those who don't follow her orders and are labeled as "sinful". The so-called "instructions" gradually become stricter and more unreasonable, as the citizens are not permitted to sing, to have lights on in their homes, or own animals, among many others.

In the meantime, a verbal conflict between the U.S. and the Phalanx Nations begins to escalate. The U.S. fears that the Phalanx Nations are trying to send terrorist spies to the U.S. and they take immediate action, although the U.S. never really goes to war with them until 50 years later. Nickie meets a boy named Grover who is obsessed with snakes but has to give them away because Mrs. Beeson says that they are sinful. There is also Hoyt McCoy, a seemingly grumpy, mean old man who studies the stars and makes contact with aliens. Later in the book, he goes to Washington and convinces the United States to not go to war with the Phalanx Nations.

Years later, Nickie is among the group of elderly people sent to populate the underground city of Ember along with babies and other children to preserve the human race until it was safe to return to the surface. Since she is forbidden to leave any records, Nickie writes an entry in her journal and hides it behind a rock for someone to read later in the future. Lina Mayfleet and Doon Harrow find it when they escape Ember at the climax of The City of Ember. In The Diamond of Darkhold, the satellite that was sent out by Hoyt and other scientists into space finally returns to Earth from an alien planet.
