= Travel to the Earth's center =

Popular theme in science fiction

Earth cutaway from core to exosphere. Partially to scale

Travelling to the Earth's center is a popular theme in science fiction. Some subterranean fiction involves traveling to the Earth's center and finding either a hollow Earth or Earth's molten core. Planetary scientist David J. Stevenson suggested sending a probe to the core as a thought experiment. Humans have drilled over 12 kilometers (about 8 miles) in the Sakhalin-I project. In terms of depth below the surface, the Kola Superdeep Borehole SG-3 retains the world record at 12,262 metres (40,230 ft) in 1989 and still is the deepest artificial point on Earth.

== Hollow Earth ==
The idea of a so-called "Hollow Earth", once popular in fantasy adventure literature, is that the planet Earth has a hollow interior and an inner surface habitable by human beings. Although the scientific community has made clear that this is proven false, the idea nevertheless is a less popular feature of many fantasy and science fiction stories and of some conspiracy theories.

== In science fiction ==
The most famous example of subterranean fiction is Jules Verne's 1864 science-fiction novel Journey to the Center of the Earth, which has been adapted many times as a feature film and for television. The novel is not an example of Hollow Earth, as his characters actually descend only 87 miles beneath the surface, where they find an underground sea occupying a cavern roughly the size of Europe.

The 2003 film The Core, loosely based on the novel Core, tells the story of a team that has to drill to the center of the Earth and detonate a series of nuclear explosions in order to restart the rotation of Earth's core. The drilling equipment, dubbed Virgil, includes a powerful, snake-like laser drill, a small nuclear reactor for power, a shell (of "unobtainium", a fictional material) to protect against intense heat and pressure (and generate energy to drive the engine), a powerful X-ray camera for viewing outside, and a system of impellers for movement and control. The only part of the Earth that turns out to be hollow is a gigantic geode, and soon after the drill moves through it, the hole it created fills with magma.

The 1986 animated television show Inhumanoids featured regular visits to the Inner Core in most of its 13 episodes. Each of the three villainous creatures theoretically ruled over certain layers of the inner Earth, and their evil schemes were thwarted by the human Earth Corps, who often allied with various races of subterranean beings equally threatened by the Inhumanoids.

During season 3 of the Teenage Mutant Ninja Turtles cartoon, the Technodrome is located at the Earth's core, and transport modules are used to drill up to the streets. This season also features the episode "Turtles at the Earth's Core", where a dinosaur lives in a deep cave, and a crystal of energy that works like the Sun to keep the dinosaurs alive. As Krang, Shredder, Bebop and Rocksteady steal the crystal to power the Technodrome, the trouble begins.

Don Rosa's 1995 Uncle Scrooge story The Universal Solvent imagines a way to travel to the planet's core using 1950s technology, although this would be impossible in reality. The fictional solvent referred to in the story's title has the power to condense everything except diamonds into a kind of super-dense dust. The solvent is accidentally spilled and, as it dissolves everything in its path, it bores a cylindrical shaft into the center of the planet. As part of a recovery effort, a makeshift platform is constructed that descends into the shaft in free fall, automatically deploying an electric motor and wheels as it approaches zero gravity, then using rocket engines to enable it to ascend again to the Earth's surface. The author Rosa describes this fantasy journey in great detail: the supposed structure of the Earth is illustrated, and the shaft is kept in a vacuum to protect against the lethal several thousand kilometers of atmosphere that it would otherwise be exposed to. The ducks must wear space suits and go without food for several days, and they are not entirely certain that the super-dense heat shield will hold. The author maintains continuity with Carl Barks, explaining that the earthquakes in the story are created by spherical Fermies and Terries.

In Tales to Astonish #2 (1959) "I Fell to the Center of the Earth", an archaeologist named Dr. Burke who is on an expedition to Asia travels to the center of the Earth (and also, as he later finds out, backwards in time)--and encounters neanderthals and dinosaurs.

In the Doctor Who episode, "The Runaway Bride", a Racnoss warship is found at the center of the planet.

In the 1966 Doctor Who spin-off film Daleks' Invasion Earth 2150 A.D., the Daleks have turned Bedfordshire into a giant mine complex, digging a shaft, accessing the Earth's core. They intend to explode a nuclear bomb to destroy the core and turn the hollowed out planet into a giant spaceship.

In the 2012 film, Total Recall, there is a gravity elevator called The Fall which runs through the centre of the Earth.

== See also ==
- Earth in science fiction
- Internal structure of Earth, layered structures
- Planetary core, the innermost layer(s) of a planet
- List of science fiction themes
- Well to Hell, a fictitious borehole in the Soviet Union which was drilled so deep that it broke through to hell
- Gravity train, a hypothetical tunnel from one point on Earth through the center of the planet and ending on the other side
- Scientific drilling

=== Deep drilling projects ===
- Project Mohole, an ambitious attempt to drill through the Earth's crust into the Mohorovičić discontinuity, abandoned in 1966
- Chikyū, Japan's outreach program to promote its drilling vessel as a contribution to the Integrated Ocean Drilling Program
- Kola Superdeep Borehole, the result of a scientific drilling project of the former USSR
- Deep Sea Drilling Project, an ocean drilling project from 1968 to 1983
- Ocean Drilling Program, an international cooperative effort to explore and study the composition and structure of the Earth's ocean basins
- Integrated Ocean Drilling Program, an international marine research drilling program dedicated to advancing scientific understanding of the Earth
