= The City of Ember =

2003 novel by Jeanne DuPrau

- First edition cover
- Author: Jeanne DuPrau
- Language: English
- Series: The Books of Ember
- Genre: Post-apocalyptic, children's literature
- Publisher: Random House
- Publication date: May 2003
- Publication place: United States
- Media type: Print (Hardcover and Paperback), digital (DVD), (Audible) Audiobook
- Pages: 270
- ISBN: 0-375-82273-9
- OCLC: 50166630
- Dewey Decimal: [Fic] 21
- LC Class: PZ7.D927 Ci 2003
- Followed by: The People of Sparks

The City of Ember is a post-apocalyptic novel by American writer Jeanne DuPrau that was published in 2003. The story is set in Ember, an underground city threatened by aging infrastructure and corruption. It follows two young protagonists, Lina Mayfleet and Doon Harrow, as they follow clues left behind by the original builders of the city to search for safety in the outside world.

It is the first installment in the Books of Ember series, which also includes The People of Sparks, The Prophet of Yonwood (a prequel), and the final installment, The Diamond of Darkhold. In 2008, the book was adapted into a film by Walden Media and Playtone.

A graphic novel adaptation by comic book artist Niklas Asker was released on September 25, 2012.

== Plot summary ==
As Earth is being ravaged by a series of apocalyptic events known as the Disaster, a coalition of architects, scientists, and doctors known as the Builders construct an underground city named Ember to ensure humanity survives, with the intention that future generations of the city will not know about the outside world or that they live underground. They build the city to last for two centuries, after which the citizens of Ember will evacuate and return to the surface world. The Builders give the first mayor of the city a box with a timed lock set to open after 200 years, containing instructions explaining how to leave Ember. The box is passed successfully from mayor to mayor, until the seventh mayor who, thinking it could contain a cure for the deadly coughing disease he contracted, takes the box home and tries multiple times to break it open, but fails. He then dies before he can return the box to its rightful place or inform the next mayor of its importance.

Approximately two hundred and forty-one years after Ember was established, the city's supplies are in danger of exhaustion, and its hydroelectric generator is in decay, causing the power to go out intermittently. At their graduation ceremony, young people are assigned jobs by lottery: Lina Mayfleet is assigned the job of "Pipeworks Laborer" and Doon Harrow is given the job of "Messenger". However, both are displeased with their assigned jobs, so they exchange their assignments and begin work in their respective positions. It is revealed that the seventh mayor was Lina's great-great-grandfather, and that the box is actually in their own home. By now, the timer has finished counting down and the lock has clicked open. When searching the closet, Lina's grandmother finds the box, but tosses it aside, not realizing its importance. The opened box is found by Lina's baby sister, Poppy, who tears up the papers inside.

Lina retrieves the paper fragments from Poppy. Believing its contents were written by the Builders, she reassembles the message as best she can, but is unable to understand what it means on her own, and enlists Doon's help to decipher it. They discover that the title of the document is "Instructions for Egress", and presume that the document must show the way out of Ember. The instructions lead to a hidden room located in the Pipeworks, an underground network of tunnels that carry the city's plumbing pipes. Lina and Doon discover that the room contains hundreds of boats, matches, and candles to create portable light, something never successfully created in Ember. The Builders intended for the citizens of Ember to board the boats and be carried down the river that flows underground throughout the city into the outside world.

Lina's grandmother dies shortly after the discovery of the document, and Lina and Poppy move in with a neighbor, Mrs. Murdo. At work, Doon discovers that the mayor of Ember and a storeroom worker named Looper have been stealing supplies. Doon and Lina report the crime to the guards, who, unknown to them, are in cahoots with the mayor and declare the two as criminals, posting notices for their arrest. Doon and Lina agree to meet in the Pipeworks and escape Ember in the boats, but Lina is arrested and taken to the mayor, who plans to throw her in jail. Suddenly, a blackout occurs, allowing her to escape without being seen; she meets Doon in the Pipeworks with Poppy. Lina, Doon, and Poppy escape in a boat via the river. When the boat stops, they learn the origin of Ember from a diary left by one of its original colonists.

The trio climb out of the city and emerge onto the surface. After exploring the above world, they find a tunnel with a steep drop into a cave. Below, they see Ember's lights and realize they had lived underground for years. To alert the rest of the city about how to leave Ember, they throw a packet with a letter detailing the path to exit down to the center of Ember. The packet is found by Mrs. Murdo.

== Critical reception ==
The City of Ember received positive reviews, with praise for its setting and its main characters, Lina Mayfleet and Doon Harrow. Kirkus Reviews praised the characters, stating: "The likable protagonists are not only courageous but also believably flawed by human pride, their weaknesses often complementing each other in interesting ways." Sally Estes from Booklist commented how readers would be able to connect to Lina and Doon's courage amidst the conflicts. Robert Sutton from Horn Book Magazine compared the novel to Gathering Blue by Lois Lowry, noting how "the darkness of Ember is essentially literal" with the generator (the mechanical light operator) failing and running out of power, leading to frequent blackouts. Sutton noted how DuPrau does not explain the history of Ember all at once, which would confuse and overwhelm the reader and instead, "allows the events of the story to convey the necessary information". Lina and Doon were described as "good sorts" that are "deeply etched". Dian Roback from Publishers Weekly also praised the "full blooded characters" as every bit as good as the plot which would hook readers until the end. Although Jones Johns from School Library Journal wrote that the setting was not as ingenious as the ones in Joan Aiken's Is and Lois Lowry's The Giver, he said that the characters and pace of the plot would keep readers hooked.

== Film adaptation ==
A film adaptation of the novel, directed by Gil Kenan, was produced by Walden Media and Playtone with Bill Murray as the mayor, Saoirse Ronan as Lina, and Harry Treadaway as Doon. Production was finished in October 2007, and the film was released in theaters a year later on October 10, 2008. The film received generally mixed reviews.

== Awards ==
- 2003 Child Magazine's Best Children's Book
- 2003 Kirkus Editor's Choice
- 2006 Mark Twain Award
- 2006 William Allen White Children's Book Award
- American Library Association Notable Book
