= Tunnels (novel) =

2007 novel by Roderick Gordon and Brian Williams

- Author: Roderick Gordon; Brian Williams
- Cover artist: David Wyatt
- Language: English
- Series: Tunnels
- Genre: Fantasy; Science Fiction; Subterranean fiction Lost World; Adventure
- Published: 2 Jul 2007, The Chicken House
- Publication place: UK
- Media type: Print
- Pages: 472
- ISBN: 978-1-905294-42-8
- OCLC: 132316306
- Followed by: Deeper

Tunnels is a subterranean fiction novel by British authors Roderick Gordon and Brian Williams. It was initially published by The Chicken House in 2007. The story follows Will Burrows, a 14-year-old 'archaeologist', who stumbles upon an underground civilization called The Colony. Will and his friend Chester flee The Colony and set out to find Will's father, in the Deeps, a place even deeper in the Earth than The Colony.

Tunnels was critically well received, although some complaints about its lengthy, slow start were recorded. The book placed on The New York Times Children's Chapter Books Bestseller List in February and March 2008. It is the first book in the Tunnels series, and was followed by Deeper (2008), Freefall (2009), Closer (2010), Spiral (2011) and Terminal (2013). BBC Audiobooks and Recorded Books have released audio editions.

== Plot ==
The main influence in fourteen-year-old Will Burrows' life is his father, Dr. Burrows, and together they share an interest in archaeology and a fascination for the buried past. When Dr. Burrows begins to notice strange 'pallid men' where they live in Highfield, and then promptly goes missing, Will and his friend Chester go search for him. They discover a blocked passageway behind bookshelves in the cellar of the Burrows home and re-excavated it, finding the passage leads to a door set into the rock, and beyond the door is an old lift that takes them down to another set of doors. A cobblestone street lies beyond, lit by a row of orb-like street lamps; houses that appear to be carved out of the walls themselves flank the street.

They are soon captured by the police of the subterranean community, known as the Colony. In prison, Will is visited by Mr. Jerome, and his son Cal. They reveal Will was actually born in the Colony, and that they are his real family; Mr. Jerome his father, and Cal his younger brother. Will is eventually released from the prison and taken to the Jerome's home, where Will and Cal's Uncle Tam is delighted to see him and informs Will that his adoptive father, Dr. Burrows, was recently there, and had willingly travelled down into the Deeps – a place even deeper in the Earth than The Colony. Will learns that the Styx, the religious rulers of the Colony, are either going to enslave Chester or banish him to the Deeps to fend for himself. Will refuses to abandon his friend, and Uncle Tam formulates a plan for him to rescue Chester and to take him back to the surface.

Will and Cal attempt to rescue Chester before he is sent to the deeps on the 'Miner's Train', but the Styx arrive and they are forced to leave Chester behind. During the botched escape attempt, it is revealed that Rebecca, Will's adoptive sister, is actually a Styx implanted in his family to monitor him. The boys head through a series of tunnels to the Eternal City, an old stone city, estimated by Will to be from Roman times, where the air is filled with deadly bio-toxins. They avoid the Styx soldiers, who patrol the city with their vicious stalker attack dogs, and eventually emerge on the bank of the Thames. Will makes for his home in Highfield, but there Will's health deteriorates, so Cal helps him to his Auntie Jean's flat where he recovers. Soon they return underground to find Will's adoptive father and attempt to rescue Chester once again. They encounter another Styx patrol, and Uncle Tam kills a member of the Styx, whom he calls Crawfly, but is mortally wounded in the fight. The strong-willed Uncle Tam chooses to stay behind to give the boys time to escape. With the help of Imago Freebone, a member of Uncle Tam's gang, Will and Cal escape to a small hiding place halfway between the Colony and the Eternal City. There, they rest and mourn for Uncle Tam; and are told by Imago that Chester's train to the Deeps will pass directly under their hiding spot shortly. They jump down into the train through a hole in the floor of the hiding spot and find Chester. Together they ride down to the Deeps. In the book's epilogue, Rebecca kills Imago, who was hiding on the surface, by poison.

== Characters ==
- Will Burrows: The main character who is an avid fan of digging
- Dr. Burrows: Will's father
- Celia Burrows: Will's mother
- Rebecca Burrows: A Styx agent planted into the Burrows household. Secondary antagonist.
- Chester Rawls: Will's friend
- Speed: The school bully, a minor antagonist.
- Bloggsy: Another bully, Speed's accomplice
- Auntie Jean: A relative of Celia Burrows who Will and Rebecca stay with for a while.
- Mr Jerome: Will's biological father
- Caleb Jerome: Will's biological brother
- Sarah Jerome: Will's biological mother
- Bartleby: A Hunter, type of cat used by the Jeromes
- Tam Macaulay: A hulking man who is a relative of the Jeromes
- Grandma Macaulay:
- Imago Freebone: One of Tam's allies
- Joe Waites:
- Jesse:
- The Crawfly: Rebecca's biological father, a major antagonist
- Terry Watkins: A man living on the top Earth level who accidentally stumbles upon a portal to the Colony, and is captured to be a slave along with his household
- Abraham de Jaybo: A man who is sent even deeper into the Earth and returns critically sick. He talks about all kinds of different things he sees, but few believe him.
- Heraldo Walsh: A minor antagonist who insults Will and fistfights with Tam
- Clarkes: The Clarke brothers run a convenience store on the Earth surface, but are seen to co-operate to some degree with the Colony
- Mrs. Tantrumi: A Styx agent, minor antagonist
- Oscar Embers: A Styx agent, minor antagonist

== Publication history ==
The novel was initially self-published under the title The Highfield Mole: The Circle in the Spiral on 17 March 2005, with a limited run of 500 hardbacks and 2,000 softback copies, financed by the sale of Roderick Gordon's house. The book received some trade press attention before launch and the entire hardback run sold within a day. On 19 November 2005, Barry Cunningham, of Chicken House, announced that he had agreed to publish The Highfield Mole and a second book in the series. Cunningham, while working for Bloomsbury in London, famously signed up J. K. Rowling, and this connection led to the book being branded "the next Harry Potter".

The authors and Barry Cunningham also decided to retitle the book Tunnels, to reflect that it had been changed by some limited editing. With the announcement of the publication date, and press coverage in the UK, the price of the original self-published books jumped dramatically, with one copy selling for £950. Tunnels was released in the UK as a softcover on 2 July 2007, and in the United States as a hardcover on 10 December 2007, and as a paperback on 1 February 2009. In Canada, the book was released as a paperback on 7 July 2007, as a hardcover on 1 January 2008, and a mass market paperback on 1 February 2009. In the United States, Tunnels had an initial printing of 100,000 copies. In February and March 2008 it appeared on The New York Times Children's Chapter Books Best Seller List.

The sequel, Deeper, was released in the UK on 5 May 2008 (in the United States on 3 February 2009), and a third book, Freefall, was published in the UK on 18 May 2009 (in the United States on 1 February 2010). The fourth book, called Closer, was published in the UK in May 2010, and the fifth, Spiral, was released on 1 September 2011, the authors released the final novel, Terminal, in 2013, concluding the series as a hexalogy.

== Critical reception ==
Many reviewers criticized the first third of Tunnels for its slow pace, but praised the remainder of the book for its fast-paced excitement, suspense, and adventure. In Britain, children's author Philip Ardagh, reviewing for The Guardian, thought the long wait for Will to discover the underground city could dull the reader's anticipation, noting that the event did not occur until page 170. He did observe, however, that when the city is reached, "fantastic fun" begins and that from then on its well-paced, exciting and – in places – frightening and bloody." He thought the characters "splendidly named and drawn". In The Sunday Times of 7 July 2007, Nicolette Jones described the book as "a good adventure yarn ... [b]ut after 460 suspenseful pages it is frustratingly inconclusive." She noted the book became a best-seller the month of its release based simply on "stories about its discovery by [publisher] Barry Cunningham, who "found" Harry Potter."

Publishers Weekly thought the book "full of holes, as if its raison d'etre were to set up the action for future books". Like The Guardian, PW commented on the slow start but noted the pace picked up once the Colony was reached. School Library Journal wrote that after a slow start, "the pace picks up", and praised the plot twists and the setting. Kirkus Reviews wrote "[d]ense but exciting" and Booklist thought "[the novel] appears to be a very promising series kickoff". The Horn Book Review felt readers "may lose patience with the slow beginning", but observed that adventure lovers would still like the plot.

== Other formats ==
BBC Audiobooks Ltd. released an unabridged version of Tunnels on CD in the UK and Canada on 5 November 2007, and in the United States on 8 November 2007. Reader Jack Davenport garnered critical praise for his "haunting tone" and his ability to depict the people of The Colony with an Irish-sounding accent and their rulers with an "intimidating aristocratic hiss." In the United States, Recorded Books released an unabridged recording on 31 October 2008 read by Stephen Crossley.

Relativity Media purchased the film rights to the novel in 2007, and in 2010 hired Vincenzo Natali to direct the adaptation. It later replaced Natali with Mikael Håfström in 2013. However, Gordon claimed that Relativity decided not to proceed with the adaptation and that the option reverted back to them after Relativity declared bankruptcy in 2015.

The Polish publishers' website features an interactive game based on Tunnels.
