= NEQUA or The Problem of the Ages =

1900 novel by Jack Adams

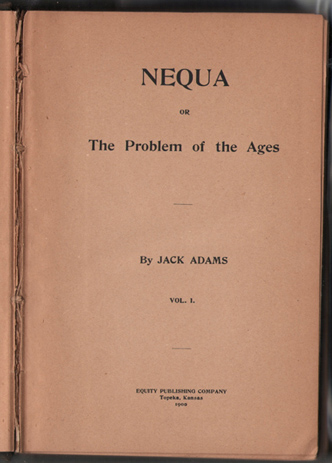
Inside front cover of NEQUA or the Problem of the Ages

NEQUA or The Problem of the Ages is one of the first feminist science fiction books published in the United States. It is also one of the first Hollow Earth novels. It was serialized in the newspaper Equity. Then in book form, two editions were published in Topeka, Kansas in 1900. The title page gives Jack Adams as author, but this is a pseudonym. One bibliographer assigned authorship to writers Alcanoan O. Grigsby and Mary P. Lowe.

== Plot ==
In the body of the work it is revealed that Jack Adams is actually a woman (Cassie) dressing in men's clothing, who has spent several years searching for her betrothed on various ocean voyages. She is so successful in her masquerade as a male that she actually works for the ship captains. The voyage described in Nequa is to the Arctic, where the ship becomes trapped in the ice. After several harrowing adventures the ship is freed and then proceeds to sail north. The Captain of the ship, Rafael Ganoa (Cassie's betrothed) is amazed to find that when they reach a certain spot, which should be close to the north pole, the compasses show that the ship is suddenly traveling south.

Actually they have sailed into the inside of the Earth, where they meet the Altrurians, a society which has developed into a more cooperative society than those on the outside of the Earth. Individual members of the Altrurian Society describe how the evolution of Altrurian society took place. These explanations reflect Populist thought of the time with definite feminist proclivities, providing the tone of a political novel.

Jack Adams exposes his/her secret and is chastised by her betrothed Captain Ganoe as having broken several conventions that exist among the outer Earth society. Jack Adams/Cassie Van Ness, now called Nequa (the teacher), takes a manuscript that she has written about this voyage and leaves in one of the new aeroplanes for the outside world to have the manuscript you have been reading published.

== History ==
Compilations which have included information about Nequa have resulted in misunderstandings about the authorship of the book. The article "New World That Eve Made: Feminist Utopias Written by Nineteenth-Century Women" authored by Barbara Quissell, which appeared in Kenneth Roemers’ America as Utopia, discusses A. O. Grigsby as a woman writer.

In Science-Fiction, the early years: A full description of more than 3000 stories, Everett Franklin Bleiler gives a synopsis and lists the authors as Alcanoan O. Grigsby, a male, and Mary P. Lowe, a female.

A. O. Grigsby (Alconoan O. Grigsby) was a Populist and later a Socialist who was editor of several newspapers from the 1890s through 1900. Mary P. Lowe was an editor of The New Woman, a women's suffrage paper, and co-editor with A. O. Grigsby of "Equity", a Populist newspaper, complete editions of which are available on microfilm from the Kansas State Historical Society.

The first edition of NEQUA listed A.O. Grigsby and Mary P. Lowe as the copyright holders. There was also an explanation printed in the first edition which credits Dr. T. A. H. Lowe with the original ideas found in NEQUA.

Dr. T. A. H. Lowe studied Eclectic Medicine at the Eclectic Medical Institute in Cincinnati. NEQUA contains many ideas which are similar to other Hollow Earth books, particularly one titled Mizora. Mizora first appeared in serialized form in the Cincinnati Commercial, a newspaper, while Dr. Lowe was enrolled at the Eclectic Medical Institute. Two other Eclectic Physicians also wrote subterranean fiction.

John Uri Lloyd was a teacher in the Pharmacy Department at the Eclectic Medical Institute in Cincinnati. He wrote Etidorhpa, which had elements of secret Masonic rituals and alchemy woven throughout the book. Cyrus Teed was also an Eclectic Institute physician who preached the existence of a world inside of the Earth. He became leader of Koreshanity, which built a commune in Florida.

According to Worldcat, NEQUA in printed form is only owned by eleven libraries. Out of print for 115 years, interest in its political, social and economic systems has reappeared on the internet. A third edition, published in 2015 by Green Snake Press, includes a new introduction and an epilogue, consisting of background material about the persons originally involved in the writing and publishing of NEQUA. The original copyright was held by newspaper editors and publishers who were political organizers using the printed word to further their political cause. NEQUA was published online in 2017.
