= Nathaniel Ames (writer) =

American writer

Nathaniel Ames (1796–1835) was the author of several books of nautical fiction and non-fiction, possibly including Symzonia: A Voyage of Discovery, which has been described as the first American science fiction novel.

Ames studied briefly at Harvard College, but left school and spent twelve years in a seafaring career, earning the sobriquet "Black Bill the Maintopman." He then settled in Providence, Rhode Island and later wrote three books of sea memoirs and sketches, A Mariner's Sketches (1830), Nautical Reminiscences (1832), and An Old Sailor's Yarns (1835). The authorship of Symzonia, which was published anonymously in 1820, has been attributed to Ames based on his travel experience and interests as well as computerized stylometric analysis.

A member of the prominent Ames family, Ames was the son of Fisher Ames, a Federalist Congressman from Massachusetts, and grandson of Nathaniel Ames, the writer of a series of almanacs.

== Bibliography ==
- A Mariner's Sketches (1830)
- Nautical Reminiscences (1832)
- An Old Sailor's Yarns (1835)
