= Starfire (novel) =

1988 novel by Paul Preuss

- Author: Paul Preuss
- Cover artist: Vincent DiFate
- Language: English
- Genre: Novel
- Publisher: Tor Books
- Publication date: February 1988 (hardcover), May 15, 1989 (paperback)
- Publication place: United States
- Media type: Print (hardcover and paperback)
- Pages: 310 (first edition, hardcover)
- ISBN: 0-312-93056-9 (first edition, hardcover)

Starfire is a science fiction novel by author Paul Preuss. First published in February 1988, it is about a group of NASA astronauts on a mission to an asteroid which is falling into the Sun.

According to the novel's afterword, Preuss and Gary Gutierrez, special visual effects supervisor on the films The Right Stuff and Top Gun, first conceived the story as a realistic science fiction film. When they realized that the film would be too expensive to make, Preuss turned the story into a novel. Preuss and Gutierrez share the book's copyright.

== Reception ==
Kirkus Reviews commented, "Intriguing and satisfying problem-solving for about half... but even the most benign readers will be tempted to skip the old-hat plotting and elephantine stereotype-building that goes before." Publishers Weekly said that "Preuss makes good use of his familiarity with both the innovators and bureaucrats of science... the characters never come alive and the workaday details of spaceflight seem humdrum."
