= Broken Symmetries =

Novel by Paul Preuss published in 1983

Broken Symmetries is a science fiction novel by American writer Paul Preuss, published in 1983.

== Plot summary ==
In the novel, the power generated by the US/Japanese TERAC accelerator in Hawaii is the subject of both scientific and political conflict.

== Reception ==
Dave Langford reviewed Broken Symmetries for White Dwarf #62, and stated that "Broken Symmetries has its flaws – like a spy-novel cliché or two – but it's an impressive and unnerving performance. In the tradition of Greg Benford's Timescape."

== Reviews ==
- Review by Debbie Notkin (1983) in Locus, #273 October 1983
- Review by Tom Easton (1984) in Analog Science Fiction/Science Fact, February 1984
- Review by Frank Catalano (1984) in Amazing Science Fiction, March 1984
- Review by Norman Spinrad (1984) in Isaac Asimov's Science Fiction Magazine, December 1984
- Review by Edward James (1985) in Paperback Inferno, #53
