= Martin Laing (production designer) =

British production designer

Martin Laing is a British production designer.

Martin Laing was born and raised in England, the son of Academy Award-winning production designer Robert W. Laing. During his childhood he traveled the world on location with his father and spent all of his free time on film sets. After attending design college in London, he joined the film industry in 1985 and began what is now a 21-year career in the art department. Laing moved to Los Angeles in 1993.

He received the Art Directors Guild’s Excellence in Production Design Award in 1997, assisting Peter Lamont on Titanic and he was nominated for the Satellite Award in 2008 in Best Art Direction & Production Design on City of Ember.

== Selected filmography ==
Production Designer

- This Means War (2012)
- Clash of the Titans (2010)
- Terminator Salvation (2009)
- City of Ember (2008)
- Ghosts of the Abyss (2003)

Art Director

- Pearl Harbor (2001)
- The Haunting (1999)
- In Dreams (1999)
- Titanic (1997)
