= The Earth House =

1993 memoir by Jeanne DuPrau

- Author: Jeanne DuPrau
- Language: English
- Genre: Adult non-fiction
- Publisher: New Chapter Press
- Publication date: May 1993
- Publication place: United States
- Media type: Print (hardback & paperback)
- ISBN: 0-449-90814-3
- OCLC: 28139679

The Earth House is a 1993 memoir by American author Jeanne DuPrau.

The Earth House was a finalist for the 1993 Stonewall Book Award.

== Plot summary ==
They hadn't pictured themselves as the sort of people to take up Eastern spiritual practice, but on their first visit to a zen center, two women discover something that speaks to them on a level deeper than their everyday experience, and they begin to make a new plan for their lives. They begin to consider giving up their suburban comforts and build a house beside a monastery in the mountains. As the walls of the house go up, the two women make and re-make plans, wrestle with a chainsaw, learn to make windows, and set up a computer powered by the sun. Their spiritual practice transforms their vision of the house, and the building of it transforms them both.
