= Series fiction =

Collection of related stories featuring similar narrative elements

Series fiction refers to a group of independently published works of fiction that are related to one another, usually through similar elements of setting and characters. A common example of series fiction is a book series. Series fiction spans a wide range of genres, and is particularly common in adventure, mystery, romance, fantasy, and science fiction. While commonly associated with children's and young adult literature, series fiction has also been a significant feature of mainstream and genre fiction for adults. Early examples include James Fenimore Cooper's Leatherstocking Tales (1823) and Honoré de Balzac's La Comédie humaine (1829).

Typically authored by a single writer, some series are collaborative efforts driven by publishers, as seen in The Hardy Boys or Sweet Valley High. Series fiction can be classified into progressive series, where characters grow and narratives are chronological, or successive series, which consist of self-contained stories that can be read in any order. The popularity of series fiction has grown with the commercialization of publishing, the rise of fan communities, and the expansion into multimedia franchises. Series fiction has been criticized for its formulaic plots and perceived lack of literary value, particularly in series aimed at younger and female audiences.

== History ==
Stories that share certain elements, like characters, have a long tradition. For example, William Shakespeare reused the character of John Falstaff in several of his plays. Victor Watson attributes the origin of series fiction to the United States. One of the earliest series fiction, and according to Watson the first American one, was the Leatherstocking Tales series by James Fenimore Cooper, which began in 1823 with The Pioneers. Some of these first appeared in the form of dime novels, and many were aimed at less demanding readers, including youths. Outside the United States, Watson names Margaret Sidney's Five Little Peppers series (debuting in 1881 with Five Little Peppers and How They Grew), which he considers the first series fiction in Australia and E. Nesbit's Bastable series (debuting in 1899 with The Story of the Treasure Seekers), which he called the first in Britain. In India, he pointed to Satyajit Ray's Feluda detective series that began in 1961.

However, Peggy Lin Duthie identified much earlier examples of series fiction in Britain, predating the American series claimed by Watson to be the earliest. She considers the earliest example to be Sir Walter Scott's Waverly Novels, which begun in 1814 with Waverley. Before E. Nesbit, she also identifies other British authors of series fiction, such as Anthony Trollope with his Chronicles of Barsetshire (which started in 1855 with The Warden), and Margaret Oliphant's The Chronicles of Carlingford (begun in 1861 with "The Executor", a short story, and a novel, The Rector)

As for non-English language examples, Watson mentioned German writer Erich Kästner with his Emil and the Detectives series (1929), and French writer Paul Berna with his A Hundred Million Francs (1955). Duthie again identified an earlier French example, the mainstream series of Honoré de Balzac, La Comédie humaine, that debuted in 1829.

In the interwar period, series fiction expanded from literature (novels) to other mediums, notably comics and films. During that time, Edward Stratemeyer's Tom Swift series was extremely popular among young readers in the United States. The postwar period saw the emergence of a female protagonist in series fiction. The use of female protagonists during this period is often criticized for being one-dimensional, with a focus solely on beauty. The popularity of series fiction increased during the internet era, from the late 1990s onward.

== Characteristics ==
Victor Watson defined series fiction broadly as "a sequence of related stories about the same groups of characters, usually by the same author", as well as "a series of narratives, published separately, often over a considerable period of time, mostly about the same characters, and usually written by one author". He notes that its key characteristics that distinguish it from other types of fiction is its "extended overall length and its composition in separate narratives". Watson although noted that there are notable exceptions to his definition. While the unifying feature for most series are characters, for some, that can be a concept, a place or an institution. For example, the Greyfriars School series by Charles Hamilton, the Chalet School series by Elinor Brent-Dyer or the Green Knowe series by Lucy Boston feature changing characters, and are connected through a particular place; while Lucy Fitch Perkins's Twins series had a theme of featuring twins, with characters, countries and historical periods varying between the installments. Likewise, while many series are primarily written by a single author, there are some notable series written by various writers (such as the Twins series, The Hardy Boys series, the Bobbsey Twins series, the Sweet Valley High or the Animal Ark series). Watson classifies them as "publisher's format series".

While series are common in genre fiction, they have also been found in mainstream fiction (as early as with Honoré de Balzac's La Comédie humaine from 1829). Series fiction is often incorrectly pigeonholed into one primary genre, but in fact many series can have elements of different genres; those genres can also change over time as authors mature or experiment with different styles. A long running series that was set in times contemporary to the readers can be seen as historical if the time in the series progresses very slowly, and it becomes long-running (ex. Alison Uttley's Little Grey Rabbit series begun in the 1920s and continued into the 1970s, with later books receiving explanatory notes about history).

Series are common in children's and youth literature. Common types of children's and youth series include adventure story, ballet story, camping and tramping story, family saga, pony story, and somewhat later, in the 20th century and growing in popularity, fantasy and science fiction story, such as the Harry Potter series. The latter genres are also common in series fiction for more mature audiences, which also often feature adventure (including western), horror, mystery, detective fiction and romance (notably, the Harlequin novels).

Brian M. Stableford noted that series fiction is a result of commercialization and mass production of fiction, and its formularization to meet readers expectations; he writes that "powerful market forces pressure publishers and writers to follow up successful works with sequels". He also observes that series are often likely to suffer from the problem of "melodramatic inflation"; i.e. "the necessity of increasing the magnitude of threats that the hero is required to overcome". One of the solutions to the later is the creation of sidestories (spinoffs) or prequels. Other reasons for continuing the series have been described as the author's desire to "fill in narrative gaps" or to write "major ideological reappraisals". On the other hand, some writers have noted that continuing the series can be challenging for various reasons such as becoming burned out in the context of a particular setting or character.

Waiting for the next installment in a series is a part of the appeal of the series, used to boost their popularity through improving and managing recipients anticipations, with purposeful marketing, journalistic and fan speculation, and related methods. Consuming more than the first part of the series implies commitment; as noted by Watson: "There is often a chanciness in choosing to read a single novel [but] you cannot read a series of twelve novels by chance". Fan communities are more likely to form around longer series; such communities themselves attract some readers. Such communities, particularly in the Internet era, can also lead to increased interaction between readers and writers, influencing the course of the series in line with fan's wishes as expressed online.

Shortest series can be as short as a single trilogy. Larger series can number as many as several hundred installments, particularly in cases of larger franchises and shared universes, such as, for example, Star Trek and Star Wars science fiction series, or the Longarm westerns.

Other terms related to series fiction, sometimes used as synonyms, include, among others, multi-part novels, sequences, and sagas. Also related are the concepts of shared universes, fan fiction and canon, particularly common in speculative fiction series (science fiction, fantasy and horror).

== Reception ==
Critical appraisal of the series can wane over time; where a first book may receive critical praise, later installments, despite strong sales, may be simply summarized or just listed in catalogues. Longer series are sometimes perceived as mass-produced works of inferior quality; this is in particular common, and sometimes justified, for authors that produce numerous installments a year, and where editing is of low-quality. Series directed at young audiences, as well as series belonging to the romance genre, tend to have the weakest reputation, due to the volume of production and formulaic plots. Series targeted at teenage girls have also been a target of criticism, due to their common focus on activities such as "frenzied shopping, gossiping, partying, and sexual encounters", and portrayal of beauty and wealth as most important and desirable qualities. Series based on television and film franchises (tie-ins) also have a poor reputation among critics.

Nonetheless, series without critical acclaim and repetition could be long-running, and have a significant fanbase. Expected familiarity with the setting, character, and author's style has been identified as part of the appeal of series fiction.

== Types of series ==
A series is sometimes differentiated from a work that is divided into smaller installments due to its size, but which forms part of a single story that begins in the first volume and concludes in the subsequent ones. Such works are often referred to as trilogy, tetralogy, etc. depending on the number of installments, and while literary scholars classify them as series fiction, they are not referred to as such by publishers. They can be compared to the concepts of "books published in installments", similar to how some shorter works (usually later published as individual books) are published in a serialized format in magazines. A well known example of such a work is J. R. R. Tolkien's The Lord of the Rings (split into three volumes The Fellowship of the Ring, The Two Towers, and The Return of the King). A proper series, on the other hand, features more strictly defined tales in each of its installments, and such installments can be more easily read without familiarity with previously published parts of the series.

Victor Watson distinguishes progressive and successive types of series, with the former being characterized by character growth, with books intended to be read in order, usually chronological. The latter, on the other hand, show much less character growth and can usually be read in any order without significant impact on the reader's understanding of the story. Some series can change from progressive to successive, or vice versa.

Series fiction spans all types of media. Major types of series fiction include, among others:

- Book series
- Comic book series
- Film series
- Radio series
- Television series
- Video game series
- Web series

However, the above typology does not distinguish between series fiction and non-fiction. Non-fiction series also exist in various media.

Series can be divided by size as well:

- trilogy is series composed of three parts
- tetralogy (four parts)
- pentalogy (five parts)
- hexalogy (six parts)
- heptalogy (seven parts)
- octalogy (eight parts)
- ennealogy (nine parts)
- decalogy (ten parts)

== See also ==
- Anthology series
- Expanded universe
- Literary cycle
- Mythos
