= Symzonia =

Symzonia; Voyage of Discovery is a piece of fictional travel literature published on November 2, 1820, by Jonathan Seymour. It was written under the pseudonym Captain Adam Seaborn and its true authorship is uncertain, although stylometric analysis performed by Paul Collins suggests that the author was Nathaniel Ames. The book is premised on the Earth being hollow and was influenced by the theories of John Symmes. The account by the fictional Captain Seaborn details a voyage from the United States in which Captain Seaborn leads a crew of sailors to the center of the Earth.

== Synopsis ==
In order to prove the existence of a hollow Earth, first proposed by Captain John Cleve Symmes, Captain Seaborn organized an expedition to the center of the Earth. Though ostensibly going "on a sealing voyage in the South Seas", Seaborn and his crew make landfall in the South Pole after Seaborn successfully sees off a mutiny. Upon debarking, Seaborn and his crew find an enormous animal resembling a mammoth and a large skeleton resembling a whale. Combined with the lush land, Seaborn thinks that he has made a discovery of incredible importance, only to be exceeded by the possibility of discovering the center of the Earth.

In celebration of their discovery, Seaborn has his blacksmith make a copper engraving of a hundred-dollar bill in order to mark their claim on this newly discovered land. Upon burying the engraving, he has his men roll a large stone on top of it to mark the spot with the words "Seaborn's Land A.D. 1817", engraved on the stone.

I first drew up a manifesto, setting forth, that I, Adam Seaborn, mariner, a citizen of the United States of America, did, on the 5th day of November, Anno Domini one thousand eight hundred and seventeen, first see and discover this southern continent, a part of which was between 78° and 84° south latitude, and stretching to the N. W., S. E., and S. W., beyond my knowledge; which land having never before been seen by any civilized people, and having been occupied for the full term of eighteen days by citizens of the said United States, whether it should prove to be in possession of any other people or not, provided they were not Christians, was and of right ought to be the sole property of the said people of the United States, by right of discovery and occupancy, according to the usages of Christian nations.

Travelling up the coast, Seaborn and his crew reach a point where the sky inverts, and they realize that the stars have changed; they are now in the center of the Earth. Venturing farther into the center of the Earth, Seaborn and his crew meet an ancient civilization who populate the center of the Earth called the Symzonians. Upon meeting the Symzonians for the first time, Captain Seaborn is unable to elicit any reaction from a crowd of Symzonians until he kneels to pray, at which point the Symzonians cheer in celebration that their visitor was Christian and discourse begins.

Though unable to communicate at first, the Symzonians show an incredible capacity to learn English. The Symzonians have no weapons of any kind, and they have no knowledge of certain topics such as optics. That said, they do have advanced knowledge in other areas, such as flight. Small, and waif-like in stature, the Symzonians have enormous strength and are white to the point of near-translucence.

The Symzonians are an extraordinarily virtuous race, and they are aghast when Seaborn informs them that there is any kind of sickness in the rest of the world. Furthermore, the Symzonians, and in particular their leader, are disgusted that Seaborn's ship has cannons and that Seaborn's people engage in armed conflict with their neighbors. It is revealed that the Symzonians banish any of their people who exhibit the sort of vice which could lead to sickness. In fact, it appears as though those Symzonians who are banished formed a society on Earth, and subsequently populated the rest of the world.

Though Seaborn played down the extent of sickness and violence, hoping to set up a relationship with the Symzonians, he and his crew are banished and stripped of any sign that the center of the Earth exists. Fearing the corruption of the outside world, the leader of the Symzonians order them never to return. Seaborn, however, is adamant that they should return, and reveals that he is writing this account in order to raise funds and volunteers for a second voyage to the center of the Earth.

== Reception ==
The book has been described as the first true science-fiction book from America, but at the time it was published, it received little attention. In its one prominent notice, reviewer Edward Everett, writing in the North American Review, reviewed the book in a manner described by Paul Collins as a "Swiftian satire on colonialism which drolly proposed trade with Symzonians."

"There is no reason to believe that the Internals will not be glad to eat flour, and wear Waltham shirtings, and smoke tobacco,” the reviewer propounded, adding that "should the Internals refuse to eat, drink, and smoke, as we direct, there then will doubtless be found ways to compel them."

In a 1821 review from The Literary Gazette; or, Journal of Criticism, Science and the Arts, the work is described as "upon the whole, dull and uninteresting. A great deal might have been made out of the subject, for there is at least as much to satirize as in the age of Swift. The author is, however, very good natured, and if there is nothing brilliant in his observations, there is nothing to offend."

== Rediscovery ==
A "rediscovery" of Symzonia and Nathaniel Ames took place around 1965, when Arno Press printed a facsimile, the book's first reprinting since 1820, with a written introduction from J. O. Bailey. A 1975 New England Quarterly article speculated that Ames could be the author, though stated the evidence for Ames is circumstantial. Stylometric analysis in 2020 by Paul Collins using the Java Graphical Author Attribution Program (JGAAP) also attributed Ames as the likely author.

In 1976, the Seattle community radio station KRAB broadcast an eight-part, four-hour radio theater series.
