= The Descent (novel) =

Book by Jeff Long

- Author: Jeff Long
- Cover artist: Rick Berry (paperback)
- Language: English
- Genre: Science fiction
- Publisher: Crown Publishers (Random House) (hardback), Jove Books (paperback)
- Publication date: July 1999 (hardback), November 2001 (paperback)
- Publication place: United States
- Media type: Print
- Pages: 572
- ISBN: 978-0-609-60293-5
- OCLC: 40158953
- Dewey Decimal: 813/.54 21
- LC Class: PS3562.O4943 D47 1999
- Followed by: Deeper

The Descent is a 1999 science fiction/horror novel by American author Jeff Long. It describes the discovery and exploration of an extensive labyrinth of tunnels and passages stretching throughout the Earth's upper mantle, found to be inhabited by a malicious species of alternately-evolved troglofauna hominids.

== Plot summary ==
A group of New Age trekkers in Tibet are trapped in a cave by a snowstorm and stumble across a mutilated, mummified corpse, covered with cryptic tattoos in both English and undecipherable symbols; the party interprets the former to mean that the body was that of a RAF pilot who had crashed on the other side of the Himalayas in the 1940s. How the pilot had made it across the mountains is a mystery, but a diagram among the tattoos suggests that the cave in which the party is trapped may be part of a larger network, one that might have an outlet elsewhere. As the blizzard shows no signs of letting up, the party pushes deeper into the network, discovering the remains of a slaughtered ancient army, displayed almost trophy-like, and a trail of gold coins. Becoming separated, the members are relentlessly killed by an unseen enemy, until only the mountain guides, Ike and Kora, remain.

Several years later, at a UN military base in Bosnia, multinational soldiers are guarding a forensic team excavating a huge mass grave, which satellite imagery shows being disturbed every night. The soldiers first assume that Serb soldiers are trying to destroy the evidence of their atrocities; a US Army Aviation officer named Elias Branch leads a reconnaissance-helicopter flight to gather evidence. After a crash, he finds his navigator brutally assaulted, is menaced by an unseen enemy, and is himself badly injured by his unit's supporting fire. Found scarred and half-mad, he raves about being attacked by "demons;" during his recuperation, he begins to exhibit dramatic physical changes, and begins taking an interest in local cave systems.

Near the edge of the Kalahari, a young nun, Ali van Schade, is about to leave a leper encampment at which she had been working. To her horror, she discovers that the lepers had saved her life by trading one of their own to be (in her place) mutilated and enslaved by an unknown presence, servants of a god they call "Older-Than-Old".

A few years later, Branch, monstrously deformed, is leading the world's armies in exploring a vast network of caves that he has been instrumental in discovering, underlying the whole of the Earth's surface. The "Descent" of the title refers not only to the literal act of descending but is also the term the narrative applies to large-scale military-led colonization of the planet's interior that begins at this point. Referred to as the "sub-planet", the labyrinth contains an entire separately-evolved ecosystem and offers rare fleeting glimpses of elusive albino humanoids. Scientists theorize these are troglofauna-like hominids descended from Homo erectus; classified as Homo hadalis (as in Hades), they are commonly referred to as "hadals", or, pejoratively, "Haddie". While presently degenerate and brutal, the archaeological evidence suggests the "hadals" had once possessed a high level of civilization, having reached the Iron Age as far back as 20,000 years ago. The beings had apparently occasionally emerged throughout human history and had (rather viciously) mentored human civilization, thereby giving rise to the human concepts of Hell and demons.

After melting invisibly away from human encroachment for several months, the hadals spring a trap: a massive, coordinated worldwide ambush of the armies exploring and occupying the sub-planet. The attack is successful; world casualties number a quarter-million. Though an enormous initial shock, the dismay wears off quickly and humanity is essentially undeterred; the Descent recommences, in even greater force. Cities are built in the upper crust, three miles deep, while social instability grows and interest in space exploration diminishes.

Meanwhile, a mysterious Jesuit priest, Father Thomas, is assembling the Beowulf Circle, an informal group of scholars dedicated to the study of the sub-planet, with the eventual aim of discovering whether "Satan" (by which they do not necessarily mean a literal person, but some kind of long-term unified authority directing the activities of the hadal race) might actually exist. A member of the Circle persuades Ali to join the group; she is attached to an expedition funded by the Helios corporation, an unprecedentedly deep trek through a newly discovered fissure that traverses the floor of the entire Pacific Ocean basin.

During their increasingly bloody journey through the cave system, the expedition scientists are guarded by untrustworthy Helios mercenaries and guided by Ike, the Himalayan tour guide from the first chapter, who had spent a decade as a slave of the hadals before being recovered by Branch's soldiers. On the way, the expedition uncovers the decaying evidence of a once-great hadal civilization, which may correspond to lost civilizations from human folklore, such as Atlantis or Mu.

Meanwhile, on the surface, a plot emerges within Helios to sterilize the sub-planet with a potent bioweapon and thereby open it to human settlement and exploitation. At the same time, the Jesuit's scholarly organization discovers that the hadals may have a mysterious method of transferring human consciousness from body to body, allowing for effective immortality; after the members of the Beowulf Circle begin to be brutally murdered one by one, the two storylines gradually converge.

== Reception ==
In its review, A Darker Vision praised the verisimilitude of the book's spelunking scenes, with vivid descriptions of underground topography.

Infinity Plus noted the novel to be a relatively rare contemporary entry in the once-common Hollow Earth subgenre, popularized by Edgar Rice Burroughs and Jules Verne, with the very concrete hellish environment evoking Dante's Inferno, while the hadals could also be read as a homage to the Morlocks of H. G. Wells.

The novel was also reviewed in the Denver Post, Milwaukee Journal-Sentinel, The Rocky Mountain News, Fort Worth Star-Telegram, Fort Lauderdale Sun-Sentinel, Baltimore Sun, Kirkus Reviews, Publishers Weekly, Library Journal, and Booklist.

== Notes ==
The novel was followed by a 2007 sequel, Deeper.

The 2005 film of the same name contains similar plot elements (a subterranean expedition trapped underground with carnivorous troglofaunal hominid creatures) but was not based on the book.

One of the marketing devices for The Descent was a "postcard from hell".
