= City of Ember =

2008 film by Gil Kenan

- Theatrical release poster
- Directed by: Gil Kenan
- Screenplay by: Caroline Thompson
- Based on: The City of Ember by Jeanne DuPrau
- Produced by: Gary Goetzman; Tom Hanks; Steven Shareshian
- Starring: Saoirse Ronan; Mary Kay Place; Bill Murray; Martin Landau; Toby Jones; Tim Robbins
- Cinematography: Xavier Pérez Grobet
- Edited by: Adam P. Scott; Zach Staenberg
- Music by: Andrew Lockington
- Production companies: Walden Media; Playtone
- Distributed by: 20th Century Fox (United States); Summit Entertainment (International)
- Release date: October 10, 2008
- Running time: 96 minutes
- Country: United States
- Language: English
- Budget: $55 million
- Box office: $17.9 million

City of Ember is a 2008 American science fiction film based on the 2003 novel The City of Ember by Jeanne DuPrau. Directed by Gil Kenan from a screenplay by Caroline Thompson, the film stars Saoirse Ronan, Mary Kay Place, Bill Murray, Martin Landau, Toby Jones, and Tim Robbins. Set after a global catastrophe in an underground city named Ember, the story follows a boy and a girl who, in response to the city's generator beginning to fail, investigate a trail of clues that will lead them to a solution.

City of Ember was theatrically released in the United States on October 10, 2008, by 20th Century Fox. The film received mixed reviews from critics, and was a box-office bomb, grossing $17.9 million against a budget of $55 million.

== Plot ==
When an unspecified global catastrophe looms, an underground city known as Ember is constructed to shelter a large group of survivors. In addition, a small metal box intended for a future generation of Emberites is timed to open after 200 years. This box is entrusted to first Mayor of the City of Ember, and each Mayor passes it on to their successor. When the seventh Mayor dies suddenly, the box is placed in a closet and forgotten about. The box opens by itself at the allotted time but goes unnoticed. Several decades later, Ember's generator begins to fail, and food, medicine, and other necessities are in dangerously short supply.

At a rite of passage event for all graduating students of Ember City School, Mayor Cole stands before the students as their future occupations are assigned by lottery. Doon Harrow, the son of inventor and repairman Loris Harrow, is assigned "Messenger" while his classmate Lina Mayfleet is assigned "Pipeworks Laborer". Shortly afterwards, the two secretly exchange assignments and Doon is apprenticed to the technician Sul. At home, Lina, a descendant of the seventh Mayor, finds the opened box and enlists Doon's help to decipher its contents. Gradually, they learn that it contains a set of instructions and directions for an exit from the city in the Pipeworks, left by the city's builders.

Later, after evading a gigantic star-nosed mole, they also discover that Mayor Cole has been hoarding food in a secret vault for his own benefit while the people go hungry. When Lina attempts to report this, the Mayor captures her and tries to confiscate the box, but she escapes during a blackout. Now fugitives from the Mayor's police, Lina and Doon, accompanied by Lina's baby sister, Poppy, use the instructions and assistance from Sul to flee the city via a subterranean river. When the repercussions of their actions trigger a panic in Ember, the Mayor locks himself in his vault, only to be devoured by the giant mole.

Lina, Doon, and Poppy eventually reach the Earth's surface, where they witness a sunrise for the first time. They also locate Ember through a hole in the ground, too far for them to call to anyone. Before they explore, Lina and Doon write a letter with instructions on how to get out of the city, which they tie to a rock and throw down to the city. The rock lands by Loris' feet, who picks it up.

== Cast ==
- Saoirse Ronan as Lina Mayfleet
- Harry Treadaway as Doon Harrow
- Bill Murray as Mayor Cole
- Martin Landau as Sul
- Mary Kay Place as Mrs. Murdo
- Toby Jones as Barton Snode
- Tim Robbins as Loris "Barrow" Harrow
- Marianne Jean-Baptiste as Clary Lane
- Mackenzie Crook as Looper
- Liz Smith as Granny Mayfleet
- Amy Quinn and Catherine Quinn as Poppy Mayfleet
- Lucinda Dryzek as Lizzie Bisco
- Matt Jessup as Joss
- Simon Kunz as Captain Fleury
- Ian McElhinney as Builder

== Production ==
In October 2004, Tom Hanks and Gary Goetzman paid in the mid-six figures to purchase the film rights to Jeanne DuPrau's 2003 novel The City of Ember. They entered negotiations with Gil Kenan to direct and Caroline Thompson to write; the deal included an option on the sequel novel The People of Sparks. Filming was scheduled to begin in early summer of 2007 and to wrap up in October of the same year, a 16-week shooting process. A former paint hall in the shipyard of Harland and Wolff in Belfast's Titanic Quarter was converted into the post-apocalyptic city.

=== Marketing ===
Leading up to the film's release, Lucas Cruikshank, best known for creating the YouTube series Fred, was contacted to promote the film using his eponymous character. A video uploaded to the channel titled "Fred is a Star in his Own Mind" features a sequence in which Fred imagines himself as a Hollywood star being the main lead in City of Ember, with Saoirse Ronan making a guest appearance as herself. Additionally, a mock-up parody trailer for the film titled "City of Fred" was also uploaded in which clips from the film were spliced and edited to comedically include Fred in place of certain characters.

== Release ==
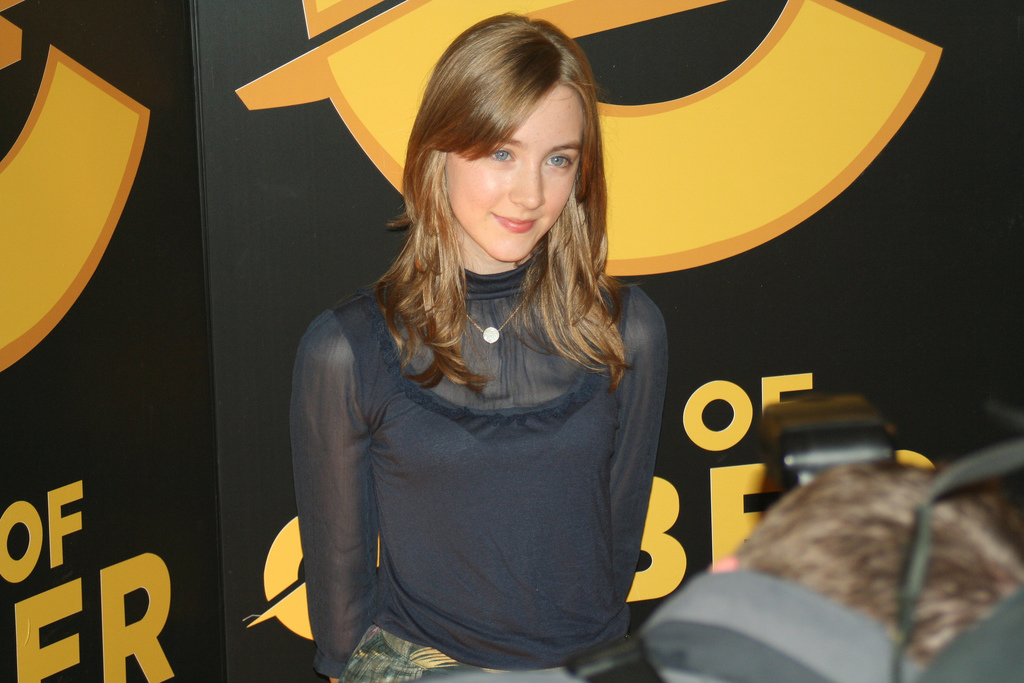
Saoirse Ronan at the film's European premiere at Belfast in 2008.

At the AMC premiere of the film, its stars chatted about their feeling that the film was thematically appropriate for the times. As Mike Flaherty wrote:

At the after-party at meatpacking district eatery Vento, the pic's baddie, Bill Murray, said, "You can't help but feel that this film is speaking to you right now, when you really feel a little bit lost, a little abandoned." Added pic's Tim Robbins, who was joined by castmates Martin Landau and Saoirse Ronan at the premiere: "I just loved the script. It had such a good, optimistic spirit about it. It's fun to play against this bleak, dark world."

=== Home media ===
The DVD was released on January 20, 2009, in a DVD-18 format with the widescreen version of the film on one side and the full-screen version on the other.

City of Ember was released in 2009 on Blu-ray disc in the United Kingdom, Australia, Germany, and France, all coded for Region B playback only, although the German release will also play on Region A players. No United States Blu-ray release has been announced, but a Region A Blu-ray was released in Hong Kong in 2010.

== Reception ==
=== Critical response ===
This film received mixed reviews from critics. Review aggregation website Rotten Tomatoes gives the film an approval rating of 53% based on 129 reviews, with an average rating of 5.8/10. The site's critical consensus reads, "City of Ember is visually arresting, and boasts a superb cast, but is sadly lacking in both action and adventure." On Metacritic the film has a score of 58 out of 100 based on 27 critics, indicating "mixed or average" reviews. Audiences polled by CinemaScore gave the film an average grade of "B+" on an A+ to F scale.

Stephen Holden of The New York Times said that the "talents of Saoirse Ronan, the brilliant young actress from Atonement", were "wasted in the science-fiction juvenilia of City of Ember", though he added, "Most of the time, however, it's a whiz-bang kid's film with neat gadgets and sound effects and an extended chase and escape sequence through underground rivers and tunnels. At only 95 minutes, the movie feels as though it had been shredded in the editing room. [...] The best things about this are scenes of the ominous grinding machinery of the kind found in railway yards, as well as several zany gadgets worthy of Rube Goldberg. The wittiest is a primitive telephone-answering machine that resembles the do-it-yourself hi-fi kits assembled by audiophiles in the early days of stereo [...] Tim Robbins is also on hand as Doon's earnest, secretly rebellious father, who spends his days tinkering with exotic inventions [...] But not to worry: the boundless resourcefulness of two curious, clean-cut adolescents full of gee-whiz enthusiasm may lead humanity back into the fresh air and sunlight."

Justin Chang of Variety also gave the film a mixed review, calling the film "A fabulously designed underground metropolis proves more involving than the teenagers running through its streets in City of Ember, a good-looking but no more than serviceable adaptation of Jeanne Du[P]rau's 2003 novel. Director Gil Kenan's disappointing live-action follow-up to his enjoyable toon debut, Monster House, shows promising flickers of the visual invention throughout, but the dramatic sparks fail to ignite in this simple-minded exercise in juvenile dystopia." Chang also observed that the characters represent "English-speaking, predominantly Caucasian humanity."

Irv Slifkin for Video Business wrote, "this lavishly designed adventure saga from director Gil Kenan... plays like Terry Gilliam's Brazil — for beginners". He praised the "secret escape plan hidden by Ember's founders" and "impressive technical work," concluding that there were "drama and sometimes lethargic pacing, but there's enough here for middle- and high-school kids to think about and marvel over."

Cinema Blend's editor-in-chief, Katey Rich gave the film 2.5 of 5 stars and said, "The City of Ember belongs to one of the best and most enduring genres of children's films, in which smart kids stand up against the ignorant and aloof adult world and have a big adventure in the process. It also throws in a fantastical city, replete with whiz-bang inventions and secret societies. It's a mystery, then, that all the happy elements only add up to a big mush, a dull adventure, and a contrived fantasy. Saoirse Ronan is a fantastic heroine, but the story and the rest of the cast can't keep up with her lively pace." She added that "director Gil Kenan seems hellbent on just driving the narrative forward. The movie clocks in at an acceptably short time for a kid's movie, but so much gets lost or glossed over along the way. Ember itself is fascinating, an intricately detailed set that, like Diagon Alley or the Star Wars cantina, you'd like to take a few hours to wander around in. But so many questions about the city are left unanswered... You get the feeling that Jeanne Du[P]rau's book got into this stuff, while the movie never seems to have the time."

TV Guide gave City of Ember 3.5 out of 4 stars, stating, "A fun and moving family film with a subtly dark feel rarely seen in kids' movies since the '80s, City of Ember succeeds despite its shortcomings, not only because of its fun and inspiring story, but because most of its flaws are things kids won't notice anyway. [...] [T]he story spins into a classic fable; the ignorance that seemed so blissful shows it's just one half of a coin, where the other side holds apathy and hopelessness. The moral might well be lost on kids, but for adults, it's compelling — all the more so because we like the good people of this dying city." This reviewer praised the "series of exciting adventures" and argued that "Lina and Doon's vigilant sense of hope is, in the end, incredibly inspiring and extremely pertinent... It might be a staple theme in family films, but the City of Ember is a useful reminder about the power of the human spirit to triumph where our own hopelessly broken systems have failed. It's a message that the filmmakers didn't take for granted — and that hopefully viewers won't either".

=== Box office ===
On its opening weekend, the film opened at #11 at the US box office with US$3,129,473. As of February 20, 2010, the film has grossed US$17,929,684worldwide, well below its US$55 million budget.

=== Accolades ===
Saoirse Ronan was nominated for 2009 Irish Film and Television Award as "Best Actress in a Lead Role in a Film". Art director Jon Billington and production designer Martin Laing were nominated for Satellite Awards in 2008 for their design of the film, as was Ruth Myers for her costume design.
