= Children's and young adult literature =

Children's and young adult literature or children's and youth literature refers to literature created for readers up to the age of about 18 years old.

It is often divided into young adult literature (ages 12–18) and children's literature (ages up to 12).
