= The Long Journey =

Book by Johannes Vilhelm Jensen

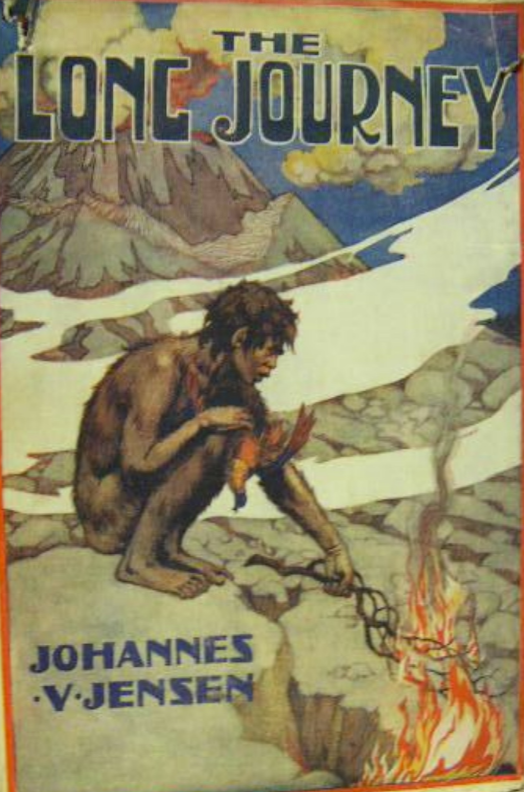
- Author: Johannes V. Jensen
- Original title: Den Lange Rejse
- Translator: Arthur G. Chater (1st English edition)
- Language: Danish
- Series: The Long Journey
- Genre: Novel
- Publication date: 1908–1922
- Publication place: Denmark
- English publication date: 1923
- Media type: Print (hardcover)

The Long Journey (Danish: Den Lange Rejse) is a series of six novels by Danish author and poet Johannes V. Jensen, appearing between 1908 and 1922. The books deal with the author's theories on evolution, backdropped against a description of humanity from before the Last Glacial Period ("Ice Age") up to the voyage of Christopher Columbus. The work is fictional, weaving in Jensen's stylistic mythic prose with his personal views on Darwinian evolutionary theory. It was primarily for this work that Jensen received the Nobel Prize in literature in 1944.

There are three editions of the text; first, the original six-volume Danish novels; secondly, a three-volume English edition, translated by Arthur G. Chater, published during 1923–1924; and finally, a two-volume edition published in 1938. Under the three volume English edition, books one and two fall under the title Fire and Ice, while books three and four are called The Cimbrians. The final two books were published under the title Christopher Columbus.

== Plot ==
The first two books take place somewhere in the primeval forests of Europe near a huge volcano. Fire glows on its summit and sometimes burning lava pours down the slopes, destroying everything in its path. For countless ages, primitive man has worshipped the fire god in dumb terror. But at last comes the first great moment in the history of mankind: the emergence from the herd of a man with a mind and a will, a Prometheus.

Fearlessly confronting the unknown, he solves the riddle of fire and brings it down on a torch to serve man. With it he lights campfires to keep off wild beasts. But he does much more. Observing the movements of the stars he infers the notion of time, the first abstract idea won from the darkness of chaos. He also takes the first step toward civilized intercourse between individuals, discovering tenderness in sexual relations, the inaugural burgeoning of what we know as love. In the end he dies a prophet's death at the hands of the obtuse masses, but he bequeathes a rich legacy to posterity.

The next two books, with a second prehistoric patriarch, begins after another measureless lapse of time. The world has changed now, the volcano is extinct, the climate cooling. There is a general migration to the south. But one man sets off in the opposite direction to grapple with hardship. He is a sort of Cain, a slayer avoided by his fellow men, whom he holds in such contempt that he does not even condescend to take their god, fire, with him to the icy lands of the North. Defying the cold, he grows hardy and strong. With a woman who has somehow found her way up there he becomes the father of the Nordic race which is so dear to Jensen, who follows its destiny.

He rediscovers fire, not simply borrowing it as before but by a stroke of genius striking it out of two minerals. And thus he founds a new civilization.

The theme is repeated in the third and fourth book with another genius who invents means of locomotion: wagons and boats driven by oar or sail. The men of the North, ready now to listen to the old call to the summer lands, begin the long journey proper.

The later books describing the journey take us down to historical times: we see the Cimbri marching on Rome and the Vikings' raids. But the story does not end until Columbus realizes that dream of a tropical paradise which is the leading idea of the book. In accordance with Jensen's peculiar theory that all great exploratory leaps in human history must be initiated by a "Nordic," Columbus is described as blonde and blue-eyed.

== Literary Influence ==
In an interview, writer Manly Wade Wellman said that Jensen's book had influenced his own work. Wellman stated " I'll say that the novel that made the biggest impression on me—I was about eighteen when I read it—was The Long Journey by Johannes V. Jensen".
