= Car Trouble (novel) =

2005 novel by Jeanne DuPrau

- First edition cover
- Author: Jeanne DuPrau
- Language: English
- Genre: Entertainment
- Published: 2005 (HarperCollins)
- Publication place: United States
- Media type: Print (hardback & paperback)

Car Trouble is a novel by Jeanne DuPrau, published in 2005. It is about a man named Duff Pringle who travels across the country for a dream job.

== Plot ==
Duff Pringle is heading across the country, aiming for his new job in technology in California's Silicon Valley. His used Ford Escort barely makes it a hundred miles from home before breaking down. He calls a car towing company to come pick him up, and when they get to the repair center, he is told the car would need to stay 2 weeks. Even though Duff has only 4 days to get to California, he checks into a motel to wait out the 3–4 days. He soon finds a note asking for someone to drive a car to St. Louis. Duff sends this person an email and gets a reply saying they would drop it off at the motel he was staying at. Duff finds Stu at a restaurant in Chipper Crossing. Stu is a hitchhiker looking to get to California too, and he asks Duff if he could come with him. Despite his appearance and behavior, Duff accepts, and they head to St. Louis to deliver the car, a 1957 Chevrolet Bel Air, to a woman named Rosalie Hopgood.

== Characters ==
- Duffy "Duff" Pringle – a 17-year-old man looking to get to California for his job
- Stu – a hitchhiker that goes along with Duff to California
- Bonnie – a heartwarming and aspiring singer who picks up with Duff and Stu in St. Louis
- Moony – Bonnie's terrier with a tendency to get carsick

== Reception ==
Kirkus Reviews stated that although "DuPrau is hardly the first" to write a novel about the "Great American Road Trip", "she produces a pleasingly zany caper peopled by amiably over-the-top characters".

Publishers Weekly called DuPrau "a smooth writer", but critiqued aspects of the novel, writing, "Duff's story, like his car, has momentum problems [...] While this may be an authentic portrayal of a teen computer whiz, unfortunately it doesn't make for a very engaging point of view and the story's moral is 'listen to your parents.'"

Booklist also reviewed the novel.
