= Reliquary (novel) =

Novel by Douglas Preston and Lincoln Child

- Author: Douglas Preston, Lincoln Child
- Language: English
- Series: Aloysius Pendergast
- Genre: Thriller
- Publisher: Tor Books
- Publication date: 1997
- Publication place: United States
- Media type: Paperback
- Pages: 480
- ISBN: 0-8125-4283-5
- OCLC: 39285732
- Preceded by: Relic
- Followed by: The Cabinet of Curiosities

Reliquary is the 1997 New York Times best-selling sequel to Relic, by American authors Douglas Preston and Lincoln Child. The legacy of the blood-maddened Mbwun lives on in Reliquary, but the focus is shifted from the original museum setting to the tunnels beneath the streets of New York City. The book is the second in the Special Agent Pendergast series.

== Plot summary ==
The story picks up where the epilogue of Relic left off. Two headless skeletons are found in the Humboldt Kill. When further decapitated bodies follow, there is suspicion of a second Mbwun monster. Major characters from the original book team up with new ones to solve the puzzle. The mystery soon leads underground to the Mole people, and even deeper towards enigmatic beings called the Wrinklers. In the end, it is revealed that the Wrinklers are led by Frock, who has refined a modified version of the Mbwun plant, created by Kawakita to regain the use of his legs. Kawakita also gave the drug to the people who were to become the Wrinklers, later made into his tribe by Frock. After going underground, the group kills them with an explosion, vitamin D infused water and a flood.

== Plot ==
=== Part 1 ===
Lieutenant D’Agosta is with some divers searching for a brick of heroin that was tossed over a bridge into the Humboldt Kill, aka the Cloaca Maxima. This is an area of the Harlem river where lots of human waste and other refuse piles up, making the water murky and disgusting. Divers find headless corpses, along with the heroin, and D’Agosta tells them to get back in and find the skulls.

D’Agosta is back to Lieutenant due to office politics. The mayor recommended him for Captain, but then wasn’t reelected, so someone else got the Captaincy. Meanwhile, Smithback talked with Mephisto, the underground king of NY, who mentioned that some of his people have been killed. Margo and Dr. Frock are trying to figure out how a weirdly-boned corpse got that way.

A New York young man proposes to his girlfriend Tanya at Belvedere Castle, but when he goes into the Men’s room to urinate, something appears. A few minutes later, his girlfriend goes into the restroom and screams. Seems like the beast killed him.

Pendergast, posing as a smelly homeless man, appears in the homicide office to visit with D’Agosta. He is going to help out on the case, in a semi-official capacity. He visits the underground, and is sure that there are several killers, not a single killer as the top police brass believes. Top brass is Chief Horlocker and Captain Waxie, both incompetent and arrogant. And D’Agosta is being helped by a smart young sergeant named Laura Hayward.

The second corpse (the one with the deformities) is identified as Greg Kawakita, because of spinal surgery that he had which left some plates in the X-rays of his corpse.

=== Part 2 ===
Pendergast and D’Agosta take a trip through the underground and meet Mephisto to discuss the murders.

Mrs. Wisher, the wealthy socialite mother of a young woman who disappeared, makes a deal with Smithback for his exclusive coverage of her Take Back the City initiative. Hayward meets Pendergast at his apartment in the Dakota.

Margo is figuring out what Kawakita was working on. Pendergast has outfitted himself for a trip to the Devil’s Attic. He starts from a locked room in the NYC Library, going down through a trapdoor.

The killers attack a subway car, after disabling tracks between almost 100 city blocks. About 7 people are killed: some have their throats cut, some have their heads removed. D’Agosta was able to interview a survivor of the attacks and get her description of them (in Spanish). Captain Horlocker is ordering police down into the tunnels to confront the suspected killers in their underground lair.

Pendergast found some strange stuff, including a throne and hut built from human skulls, in the Astor tunnels. There’s a “king,” and we don’t know who it is yet. There’s a big push now to flood the tunnels at midnight. In support of this, the police are going to roust all the homeless who live down there. Meanwhile, there’s a huge Take Back the City event going on in Central Park, which is probably going to hinder the police in their effort to roust the homeless.

The order comes down to dump 100 million gallons of water through the reservoir and into the tunnels, then out to the Hudson river and the sea. Problem is, Margo just realized the reservoir is full of the lily pads that carry the virus. And, if they get to the ocean, there are microorganisms that the virus affects.

=== Part 3 ===
Big battle ensues between marchers and homeless, after police use gas in the tunnels, driving hundreds of the underground homeless to the surface.

Waxie and Duffy the engineer head down to manually turn off valves to stop water from entering the tunnels. Smithback follows them. He watches Waxie and a couple of cops get killed by Wrinklers, then he flees into a tunnel heading down. D’Agosta, Mephisto, and AP arm themselves from the FBI armory, and head into the tunnels to blow up the exits into the river. Margo catches up with them, when she realizes that Vitamin D will kill the Wrinklers. She’s armed with 3 liters of Vitamin D solution. A SEAL team also heads to tunnels to blow them up from the outside. The dive cop from the beginning of the book is alone in the dive house when they come, so he is guiding them to tunnels, through the waste treatment waters.

Smithback meets up with Duffy in the tunnel heading down. As they flee, Duffy gets killed. Smithback runs blindly through the tunnels. He meets up with the others at the Bottleneck. They place some charges. The SEAL team is doing the same thing near the treatment plant.

The SEAL team killed all except one guy who is partnered with Snow. Pendergast and his group are captured and brought to the Crystal Pavilion, where the creatures hold their ceremonies. Dr. Frock is revealed to be the leader of the creatures. Pieces of his wheelchair are the metal objects on display. The virus cured his paralysis.

Snow comes into the Pavilion and uses weapons and flares to divert the Wrinklers. Then, Mephisto detonates an anti-personnel mine, killing himself and a bunch of the creatures. As the group is fleeing, Margo used her Vitamin D bottles on the creatures, killing a bunch and driving the rest back.

== Characters ==
Many major characters from Relic return:

- Dr. Margo Green - now assistant curator of the New York Museum of Natural History
- Lieutenant Vincent D'Agosta - New York Police Department, initially in charge of the investigation.
- A. X. L. Pendergast - Special Agent for the FBI
- Bill Smithback - journalist, now crime reporter working for the New York Post
- Dr. Whitney C. Frock - Margo Green's former PhD mentor, evolutionary biologist, retired from the museum.

New Characters:

- Sergeant Laura Hayward - New York police officer who worked on a unit to roust the homeless; a published author working on her master's degree in Sociology at New York University and an expert on the underground societies of New York. The second and third sections of the novel are preceded by excerpts from a paper she wrote that is awaiting publication. Later appears in the Preston & Child novels Brimstone, Dance of Death, The Book of the Dead and Fever Dream. In the years between Reliquary and Brimstone Hayward is promoted to captain.
- Captain Jack Waxie - D'Agosta's superior; takes over the investigation
- Anette Wisher - mother of murdered socialite Pamela Wisher, who then leads a crusade to save the city from crime.
- Redmond Horlocker - Chief of the New York Police Department
- Mephisto - the leader of an underground community beneath Central Park
- Dr. Simon Brambell - Chief Medical Examiner (his brother appears in other novels by Preston & Child)
- Bryce Harriman - crime reporter for The New York Times; Smithback's rival
