= Paul Preuss (author) =

American science writer

- Born: Paul Preuss; March 7, 1942 (age 84); Albany, Georgia, United States
- Education: Yale
- Writing career
- Language: English
- Years active: 1983–2010
- Genres: Science fiction, military science fiction, non-fiction

Paul Preuss (born March 7, 1942, in Albany, Georgia) is an American writer of science fiction and science articles, who also works as a science consultant for film companies. He is the author of numerous stand-alone novels as well as novels in Arthur C. Clarke's Venus Prime series, based upon incidents, characters, and places from Clarke's short stories.

Preuss was a consulting editor for the six-book Dr. Bones series (1988–1989) published by Ace Books.

== Personal life ==
Preuss was born in Albany, Georgia. His father, who worked in the Air Force was stationed at Turner Field. In the first few years of his life Paul had lived in Georgia, Texas, New Mexico, Hawaii and Virginia. The Preusses settled down in Albuquerque. Paul's father began working at Sandia Base testing nuclear bombs. The scientists Paul met during these formative years were an influence on the types of characters he would write about 40 years later. Paul went to school at Yale, where he met and befriended Sidney Mintz as well as Jean Rouch.

== Bibliography ==
=== Standalone novels ===
Title	Publisher	Date	ISBN	Notes
The Gates of Heaven	Bantam Books	May 1980	ISBN 0-553-13409-4	Locus Magazine "Best First Novel" Nominee
Re-Entry	Bantam Books	February 1981	ISBN 0-553-14834-6	
Human Error	Tor Books	October 1985	ISBN 0-312-93332-0	
Starfire	Tor Books	December 1988	ISBN 0-312-93056-9	Locus Magazine "Best Science Fiction Novel" Nominee
Core	William Morrow and Company	September 1993	ISBN 0-688-09662-X	

=== Series ===
==== Peter Slater ====
Title	Publisher	Date	ISBN	Notes
Broken Symmetries	Timescape Books	October 1983	ISBN 0-671-47542-8	Locus Magazine "Best Science Fiction Novel" Nominee
Secret Passages	Tor Books	August 1997	ISBN 0-312-86346-2	Locus Magazine & Campbell Memorial "Best Science Fiction Novel" Nominee

==== Arthur C. Clarke's Venus Prime ====
Title	Publisher	Date	ISBN
Breaking Strain	Avon	November 1987	ISBN 0-380-75344-8
Maelstrom	Avon	September 1988	ISBN 0-380-75345-6
Hide and Seek	Avon	June 1989	ISBN 0-380-75346-4
The Medusa Encounter	Avon	March 1990	ISBN 0-380-75348-0
The Diamond Moon	Avon	November 1990	ISBN 0-380-75349-9
The Shining Ones	Avon	August 1991	ISBN 0-380-75350-2

=== Short fiction ===
Title	Publisher	Date	ISBN
Small Bodies	Bantam Books	December 1985	ISBN 0-553-05109-1
The Long Fall Home	Interzone	September 1988	
Half-Life	Bantam Spectra	November 1989	ISBN 0-553-05705-7
Rhea's Time	Bantam Spectra	October 1992	ISBN 0-553-07676-0
