= Roderick Gordon =

British author

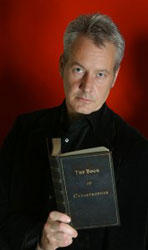
- Born: November 1960 (age 65); London, England
- Occupation: Author
- Writing career
- Genres: Fantasy; Science fiction Subterranean fiction Lost world Adventure; Children's literature
- Notable work: Tunnels Series
- Website: www.roderickgordon.com

Roderick Gordon (born November 1960) is a British author, best known for Tunnels, a bestselling children's book and the first book in the Tunnels series by Roderick Gordon and Brian Williams.

== Biography ==
Born in November 1960, Roderick grew up in Highgate, North London. Chronically shy throughout his childhood, he sought refuge in drawing and writing, and whilst at the Hall School, Hampstead, he had his first short story published in the school magazine, at the age of twelve. He went on to public school at Oundle, and then attended University College, London, where he read biology (specializing in genetics). It was here that he met his future collaborator on the Tunnels series of books, Brian Williams, who was at the Slade School of Fine Art. They became friends in the summer of 1980, and kept in touch until, some twenty-three years later, they finally began to cooperate on their writing.

After an unsuccessful attempt to transfer to medical school to train as a doctor, Roderick had graduated from University College London in 1983 without any idea of what career he wanted to follow. For several years he wrote music and played in a number of bands, and also toyed with the idea of getting into films (he was employed briefly by George Harrison's Handmade Films), but eventually ended up in the City. Here he worked in corporate finance, specializing in private equity transactions. In 2001, after a nine-year stretch with an investment bank, Roderick was made redundant, something that he has since described as a blessing in disguise. He was now able to meet more regularly with his old university friend, Brian Williams, and in 2003, they decided to start working together. Their first project was a film screenplay for a crime thriller called "Second Face". They both found the process so rewarding that they decided they would continue the collaboration, and embarked on a book for younger readers, an idea first suggested by Roderick's wife, Sophie.

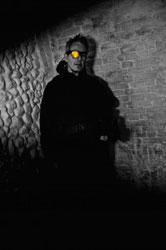
Roderick Gordon dressed as one of his characters, Drake, from the Tunnels books

Roderick had always been interested in archaeology and palaeontology. Amongst his ancestors (which include R.D. Blackmore and Matthew Arnold) was William Buckland, his great-great-grandfather, who is widely recognized to be one of the forefathers of geology. In 1824, Professor Buckland gave what is credited to be the first scientific lecture on the jaw bone of a dinosaur called the Megalosaurus, some twenty years before the word dinosaur itself was coined by Richard Owen. Roderick himself was fascinated by "what lies beneath", and when he bought a sixteenth-century country house in Northamptonshire and was told that it was rumored to have a secret passage beneath it, he began to think about a character who would eventually become "Will Burrows" in the Tunnels books. All through late 2003 and the summer of 2004, Roderick and Brian worked together, and in 2005 Roderick finally self-published the first book in the Tunnels series, then known as The Highfield Mole. It quickly sold out, attracting the attention of Barry Cunningham, J.K. Rowling's original publisher and founder of The Chicken House, a publisher of children's books. Barry Cunningham signed Roderick and Brian for the first two books in the proposed series. After a period of editing, he republished The Highfield Mole in July 2007, renaming the book as Tunnels to reflect the fact that it had been subject to a degree of change.

After intense media interest around its launch, Tunnels was a huge success, and has now been published in forty countries, achieving sales of more than a million copies worldwide. Both Tunnels and sequel Deeper reached The New York Times Best Seller List. Tunnels was also a finalist on TV Channel 4's Richard & Judy's Best Kids Book's Ever (11+). Shortly after publication, the film rights were purchased by the US production company Relativity Media in a deal worth more than $1m. Vincenzo Natali has been appointed as Director and shooting is expected to begin in 2010. A three-part manga of the book has also been released in Japan. Tunnels has been followed by further books in the series, Deeper (2008) and Freefall (2009), and a further installment entitled Closer was published in the UK on 3 May 2010 and the fifth book, Spiral, in 2011. The sixth and final book in the Tunnels series is called Terminal and was published in the UK on 6 May 2013. Roderick lives in North Norfolk with his wife and two sons. His eldest son, George, is currently studying English at university.

== Novels ==
The Tunnels Series:

- Tunnels (2007)
  - Tunnels was originally self-published as The Highfield Mole in 2005
- Deeper (2008)
- Freefall (2009)
- Closer (2010)
- Spiral (2011)
- Terminal (2013)
