= Jeff Long (writer) =

American writer

Jeff Long is an American writer and researcher. He is a recipient of the 1993 Boardman Tasker Prize for Mountain Literature for his work, The Ascent.

== Bibliography ==
=== Fiction ===
- Angels of Light (1987, ISBN 978-0070386921)
- The Ascent (1993, ISBN 978-0747240488)
- Empire of Bones (1993, ISBN 9780688122522,)
- The Descent (#1, 1999, ISBN 9780515131758)
- Year Zero (2003, ISBN 0743406117)
- The Reckoning (2004, ISBN 0743463005)
- The Wall (2006, ISBN 9780743498708)
- Deeper: A Novel (#2, 2007, ISBN 9780743284547)
- Too Close to God (2015, ISBN 978-0991807659)

=== Non-fiction ===
- Outlaw: The Story of Claude Dallas (1986, ISBN 978-0070386907)
- Duel of Eagles: The Mexican and U.S. Fight for the Alamo (1991, ISBN 978-0688109677)
