= The Diamond of Darkhold =

2008 novel by Jeanne DuPrau

The Diamond Of Darkhold
- First edition cover
- Author: Jeanne DuPrau
- Language: English
- Series: The Book of Ember series
- Genre: Young adult, Science fiction, Fantasy novel
- Publisher: Random House/Yearling
- Publication date: August 26, 2008
- Publication place: United States
- Media type: Print (hardcover and paperback)
- Pages: 285 (hardcover)
- ISBN: 0-375-85571-8 (hardcover first edition)
- OCLC: 191023753
- Preceded by: The Prophet of Yonwood

The Diamond of Darkhold is a post-apocalyptic science fiction novel by American author Jeanne DuPrau, published in 2008. The novel is the fourth "Book of Ember" and was released on August 26, 2008.

== Plot ==
The story begins with the Builders discussing what the Emberites should do when they are released from the city. It is decided that a recent invention (which is later shown to be a diamond-like gadget) will be stored alongside a guide providing information regarding its use. However, these items are left undiscovered when the Emberites escape.

Nine months after Ember and Sparks have reached a truce, a roamer comes into town with a mysterious book, on the front of which is printed "For the People of Ember". Lina Mayfleet and Doon Harrow obtain the book via barter but soon learn it contains only eight pages, as the trader used the rest to light campfires. Unable to make sense of the book's remaining contents, Lina and Doon decide to return to Ember to investigate.

When they arrive, they discover that a family has taken over the darkened city. The Troggs — Washton, Kanza, Minny, Yorick, and an adopted boy, Tim, whom they have named "Scawgo" — believe they own Ember and have renamed it Darkhold. They capture Doon, but he manages to communicate with Lina and she goes back to Sparks for help. Meanwhile, Lizzie Bisco (from Ember), Torren Crane, and Kenny Parton (both from Sparks) attempt to locate Lina and Doon but don't succeed, prompting another, larger search party to go looking for them. While Doon is with the Troggs, they show him a diamond they found just outside Ember, but Scawgo gives Doon the diamond and Doon escapes. In the process, he also breaks the pipe connecting the generator to the waterwheel that created power for Ember, thereby stopping Ember's lights and cutting off the city's water supply for good, making it so the Trogg family will have to leave Ember since they relied on the intermittent power-supply to pipe water to them.

When Doon finds Lina, a pack of hungry wolves is threatening her. Doon throws the diamond at the wolves to frighten them away, the diamond shatters and he twists his ankle in the process. Lina treats his wound and takes him to the place where the book and the diamond were discovered. There, they uncover shelves filled with hundreds upon hundreds of diamonds, and Lina and Doon realize that the devices are solar-powered sources of electricity. Ultimately, the people of Sparks and the former Emberites help them retrieve the diamonds and other items left behind in Ember, enough to ensure both groups will survive the coming winter. Before returning to the Earth's surface, Lina goes to collect the drawings of her "dream city" that she sketched at her former home in Ember, but she does not find them, so she then goes to City Hall and stands on top of the building as she did in the first book to say "Goodbye, Ember — forever."

Later, the Troggs arrive in Sparks and decide to settle there after learning why Ember was abandoned in the first place. Tim reveals that he found Doon's insect book and Lina's drawings and offers to give them back. Lizzie takes an interest in Tim (abandoning her earlier hope of becoming Doon's girlfriend), while Lina gets a horse named Fleet and becomes a messenger like she was in Ember. The last chapter reveals that Lina and Doon eventually fall in love and have children together. Many years later, after new cities have been built using solar power, one of their descendants views the now-fragile pictures drawn by Lina as a girl in Ember and notes how strongly they resemble a world she didn't live to see but nonetheless helped create. The story then goes back to the summer after the expedition to Ember and has the reader imagine Torren flying an airplane to find a spacecraft flying through space that reveals there is alien life in this universe that had been watching humanity for 200 years even before the disaster.
