= Jeanne DuPrau =

American novelist (born 1944)

- Born: June 9, 1944 (age 82); San Francisco, California, U.S.
- Occupation: Novelist
- Writing career
- Notable work: The Books of Ember
- Website: www.jeanneduprau.com

Jeanne DuPrau (born 1944) is an American author, best known for The Books of Ember, a series of science fiction novels for young people. She lives in Menlo Park, California.

== Works ==
=== The Books of Ember ===
- The City of Ember (2003)
- The People of Sparks (2004)
- The Prophet of Yonwood (2006)
- The Diamond of Darkhold (2008)

=== Other fiction ===
- Car Trouble (2005)
- Voyagers: Escape the Vortex (2016)
- Project F (2023)

=== Nonfiction ===
- The Earth House (1993)
- Adoption: The Facts, Feelings, and Issues of a Double Heritage (1981)
- Cells (2001)
- Cloning (1999)
- Daily Life in the American Colonies (2001)

=== Short stories ===
- "Pearl's Fateful Wish" (2011), included in the young adult short story collection What You Wish For

== Film adaptations ==
A film adaptation of The City of Ember, called City of Ember, was released in October 2008. It was filmed in Belfast, Northern Ireland and stars Bill Murray as the Mayor of Ember, Saoirse Ronan, Harry Treadaway, Tim Robbins and Martin Landau.
