= American Museum of Natural History =

Natural history museum in Manhattan, New York

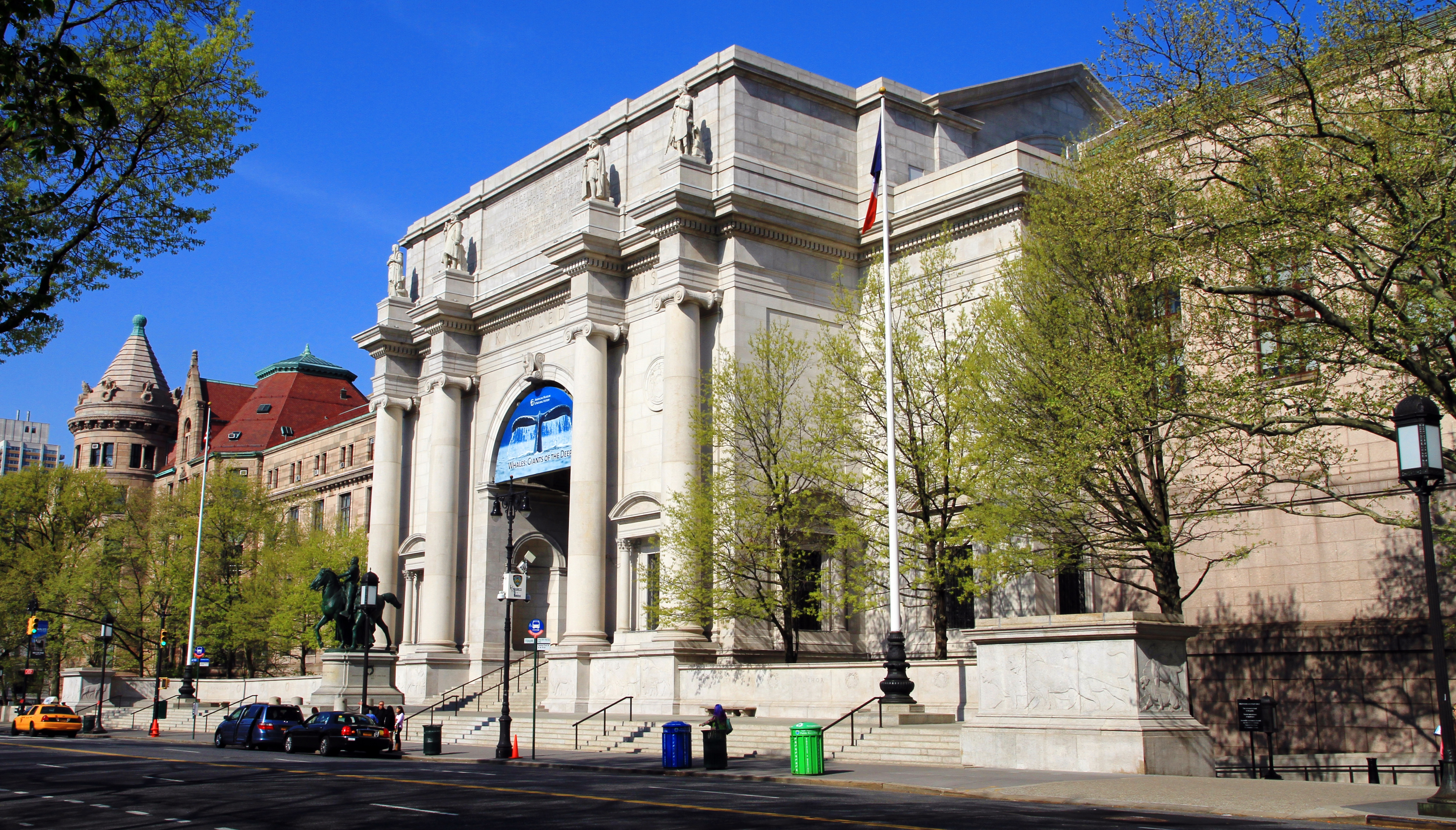
- Facade of the east entrance from Central Park West
- Established: April 6, 1869; 157 years ago
- Location: 200 Central Park West; New York, N.Y. 10024; United States
- Coordinates: 40°46′51″N 73°58′28″W
- Type: Private 501(c)(3) organization Natural history museum
- Visitors: 5 million (2018)
- President: Sean M. Decatur
- Public transit access: New York City Bus: M7, M10, M11, M79; New York City Subway: trains at 81st Street–Museum of Natural History train at 79th Street
- Website: www.amnh.org
- American Museum of Natural History
- U.S. National Register of Historic Places
- New York State Register of Historic Places
- New York City Landmark
- Built: 1874; 152 years ago
- NRHP reference No.: 76001235
- NYSRHP No.: 06101.000178
- NYCL No.: 0282, 0889

Significant dates
- Added to NRHP: June 24, 1976
- Designated NYSRHP: June 23, 1980
- Designated NYCL: August 24, 1967

The American Museum of Natural History (AMNH) is a natural history museum on the Upper West Side of Manhattan in New York City. Located in Theodore Roosevelt Park, across the street from Central Park, the museum complex comprises 21 interconnected buildings housing 45 permanent exhibition halls, in addition to a planetarium and a library. The museum collections contain about 32 million specimens of plants, animals, fungi, fossils, minerals, rocks, meteorites, human remains, and human cultural artifacts, as well as specialized collections for frozen tissue and genomic and astrophysical data, of which only a small fraction can be displayed at any given time. The museum occupies more than 2,500,000 ft^{2} (232,258 m^{2}). AMNH has a full-time scientific staff of 225, sponsors over 120 special field expeditions each year, and averages about five million visits annually.

The AMNH is a private 501(c)(3) organization. The naturalist Albert S. Bickmore devised the idea for the American Museum of Natural History in 1861, and, after several years of advocacy, the museum opened within Central Park's Arsenal on May 22, 1871. The museum's first purpose-built structure in Theodore Roosevelt Park was designed by Calvert Vaux and J. Wrey Mould and opened on December 22, 1877. Numerous wings have been added over the years, including the main entrance pavilion (named for Theodore Roosevelt) in 1936 and the Rose Center for Earth and Space in 2000.

== History ==
=== Founding ===
==== Early efforts ====
The naturalist Albert S. Bickmore devised the idea for the American Museum of Natural History in 1861. At the time, he was studying in Cambridge, Massachusetts, at Louis Agassiz's Museum of Comparative Zoology. Observing that many European natural history museums were in populous cities, Bickmore wrote in a biography: "Now New York is our city of greatest wealth and therefore probably the best location for the future museum of natural history for our whole land." For several years, Bickmore lobbied for the establishment of a natural history museum in New York. Upon the end of the American Civil War, Bickmore asked numerous prominent New Yorkers, such as William E. Dodge Jr., to sponsor his museum. Although Dodge himself could not fund the museum at the time, he introduced the naturalist to Theodore Roosevelt Sr., the father of future U.S. president Theodore Roosevelt.

Calls for a natural history museum increased after Barnum's American Museum burned down in 1868. Eighteen prominent New Yorkers wrote a letter to the Central Park Commission that December, requesting the creation of a natural history museum in Central Park. Central Park commissioner Andrew Haswell Green indicated his support for the project in January 1869. A board of trustees was created for the museum. The next month, Bickmore and Joseph Hodges Choate drafted a charter for the museum, which the board of trustees approved without any changes. It was in this charter that the "American Museum of Natural History" name was first used. Bickmore said he wanted the museum's name to reflect his "expectation that our museum will ultimately become the leading institution of its kind in our country", similar to the British Museum. Before the museum was established, Bickmore needed to secure approval from Boss Tweed, leader of the powerful and corrupt Tammany Hall political organization. The legislation to establish the American Museum of Natural History had to be signed by John Thompson Hoffman, the governor of New York, who was associated with Tweed.

==== Creation and new building ====
Hoffman signed the legislation creating the museum on April 6, 1869, with John David Wolfe as its first president. (Note: The founders included Theodore Roosevelt Sr., John David Wolfe, William T. Blodgett, Robert L. Stuart, Andrew H. Green, Robert Colgate, Morris K. Jesup, Benjamin H. Field, D. Jackson Steward, Richard M. Blatchford, J. P. Morgan, Adrian Iselin, Moses H. Grinnell, Benjamin B. Sherman, A. G. Phelps Dodge, William A. Haines, Charles A. Dana, Joseph H. Choate, Henry G. Stebbins, Henry Parish, and Howard Potter.) Subsequently, the chairman of the AMNH's executive committee asked Green if the museum could use the top two stories of Central Park's Arsenal, and Green approved the request in January 1870. Insect specimens were placed on the lower level of the Arsenal, while stones, fossils, mammals, birds, fish, and reptiles were placed on the upper level. The museum opened within the Arsenal on May 22, 1871. The AMNH became popular in the following years. The Arsenal location had 856,773 visitors in the first nine months of 1876 alone, more than the British Museum had recorded for all of 1874.

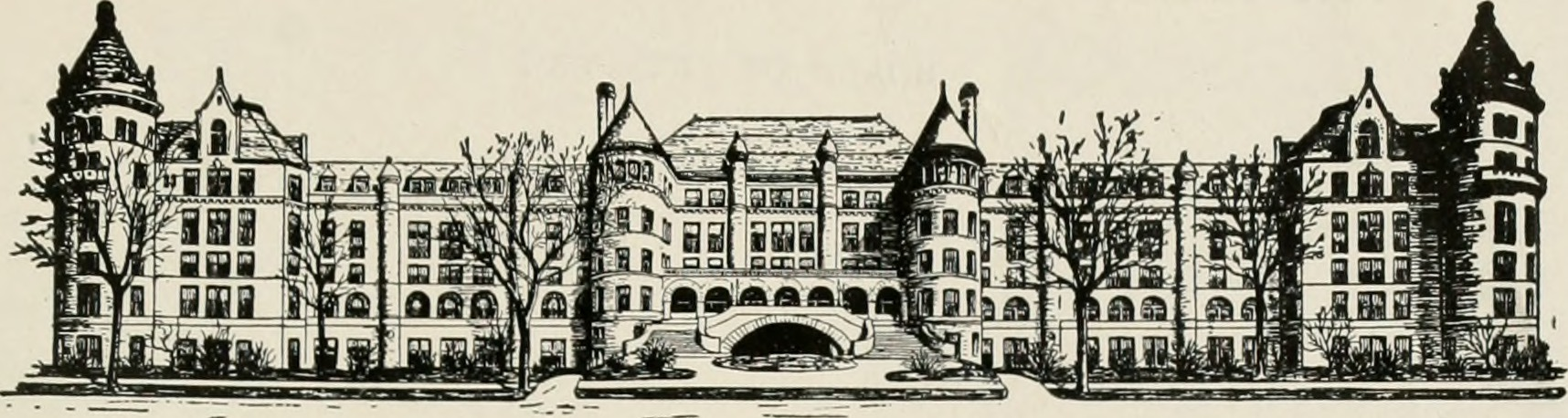
Drawing of the AMNH south facade, publication 1916

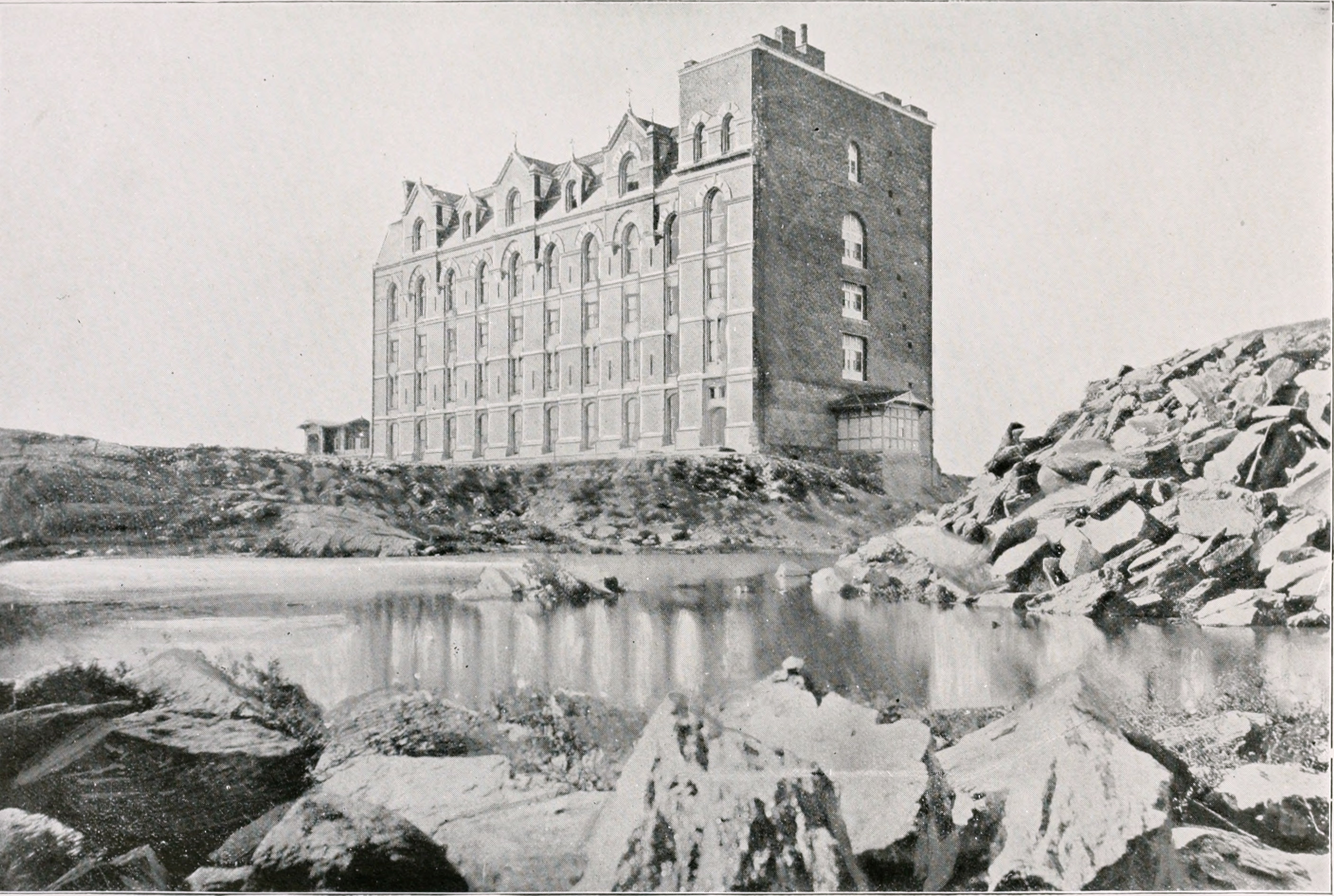
This wing was built from 1874 to 1877.

Meanwhile, the AMNH's directors had identified Manhattan Square (bounded by Eighth Avenue/Central Park West, 81st Street, Ninth Avenue/Columbus Avenue, and 77th Street) as a site for a permanent structure. Several prominent New Yorkers had raised $500,000 to fund the construction of the new building. The city's park commissioners then reserved Manhattan Square as the site of the permanent museum, and another $200,000 was raised for the building fund. Numerous dignitaries and officials, including U.S. president Ulysses S. Grant, attended the museum's groundbreaking ceremony on June 3, 1874.

The museum opened on December 22, 1877, with a ceremony attended by U.S. president Rutherford B. Hayes. The old exhibits were removed from the Arsenal in 1878, and the AMNH was debt-free by the next year.

=== 19th century ===
Originally, the AMNH was accessed by a temporary bridge that crossed a ditch, and it was closed during Sundays. The museum's trustees voted in May 1881 to complete the approaches from Central Park, and work began later that year. The landscape changes were nearly complete by mid-1882, and a bridge over Central Park West opened that November. At this point, the AMNH's Manhattan Square building and the Arsenal could not physically fit any more objects, and the existing facilities, such as the 100-seat lecture hall, were insufficient to accommodate demand. The trustees began discussing the possibility of opening the museum on Sundays in May 1885, and the state legislature approved a bill permitting Sunday operations the next year. Despite advocacy from the working class, the trustees opposed Sunday operations because it would be expensive to do so. At the time, the museum was open to the general public on Wednesdays through Saturdays, and it was open exclusively to members on Mondays and Tuesdays. The museum's collections continued to grow during the 1880s, and it hosted various lectures through the 19th century.

With several departments having been crowded out of the original building, New York state legislators introduced bills to expand the AMNH in early 1887; thousands of teachers endorsed the legislation. City parks engineer Montgomery A. Kellogg was directed to prepare plans for landscaping the site. In March 1888, the trustees approved an entrance pavilion at the center of the 77th Street elevation. The New York City Board of Estimate began soliciting bids from general contractors in late 1889. Many of the objects and specimens in the museum's collection could not be displayed until the annex was opened. The original building was refurbished during 1890, and the museum's library was transferred to the west wing that year. The AMNH's trustees considered opening the museum on Sundays by February 1892 and stopped charging admission that July. The museum began Sunday operations in August, and the southern entrance pavilion opened that November. Even with the new wing, there was still not enough space for the museum's collection. The city's Park Board approved a new lecture hall in January 1893, but the hall was postponed that May in favor of a wing extending east on 77th Street. A contract to furnish the east wing was awarded in June 1894.

When the east wing was nearly completed in February 1895, the AMNH's trustees asked state legislators for $200,000 to build a wing extending west on 77th Street. The east wing was still being furnished by August; its ground floor opened that December. The museum's funds and collections continued to grow during this time. A hall of mammals opened within the museum in November 1896. That year, the AMNH received approval to extend the east wing northward along Central Park West, creating an L-shaped structure. Plans for an expanded east wing were approved in June 1897, and a contract was awarded two months later. The museum's director Morris K. Jesup also sponsored worldwide expeditions to obtain objects for the collection. By mid-1898, the west wing, the expanded east wing, and a lecture hall at the center of the museum were underway; however, the project encountered delays due to a lack of city funding. The west and east wings, with several exhibit halls, were nearly complete by late 1899, but the lecture hall had been delayed. A hall dedicated to ancient Mexican art opened that December.

=== 20th century ===
==== 1900s to 1940s ====
The museum's 1,350-seat lecture hall opened in October 1900, as did the Native American and Mexican halls in the west wing. During the 1900s, the AMNH sponsored several expeditions to grow its collection, including a trip to Mexico, a trip to collect fauna from the Pacific Northwest, a trip to collect art in China, and an expedition to collect rocks in local caves. One such exhibition yielded a brontosaurus skeleton, which was the centerpiece of the dinosaur hall that opened in February 1905.

In the early 1920s, museum president Henry Fairfield Osborn planned a new entrance for the AMNH, which was to contain a memorial to Theodore Roosevelt. Also around that time, the New York state government formed a commission to study the feasibility of a Roosevelt memorial. After a dispute over whether to put the memorial in Albany or in New York City, the government of New York City offered a site next to the AMNH for consideration. The commission rejected a "conventional Greek mausoleum" design, instead opting to design a triumphal arch and hall in a Roman style. In 1925, the AMNH's trustees hosted an architectural design competition, selecting John Russell Pope to design the memorial hall. Construction began in 1929, and the trustees approved final plans the next year. J. Harry McNally was the general contractor. Roosevelt's cousin, U.S. president Franklin D. Roosevelt, dedicated the memorial on January 19, 1936.

==== 1950s to 1990s ====
The original building was later known as "Wing A". During the 1950s, the top floor was renovated into a library, being redecorated with what Christopher Gray of The New York Times described as "dropped ceilings and the other usual insults". The ten-story Childs Frick Building, which contained the AMNH's fossil collection, was added to the museum in the 1970s.

The architect Kevin Roche and his firm Roche-Dinkeloo have been responsible for the master planning of the museum since the 1990s. Various renovations to both the interior and exterior have been carried out. Renovations to the Dinosaur Hall were undertaken beginning in 1991, and Roche-Dinkeloo designed the eight-story AMNH Library in 1992. The museum's Rose Center for Earth and Space was completed in 2000.

=== 21st century ===
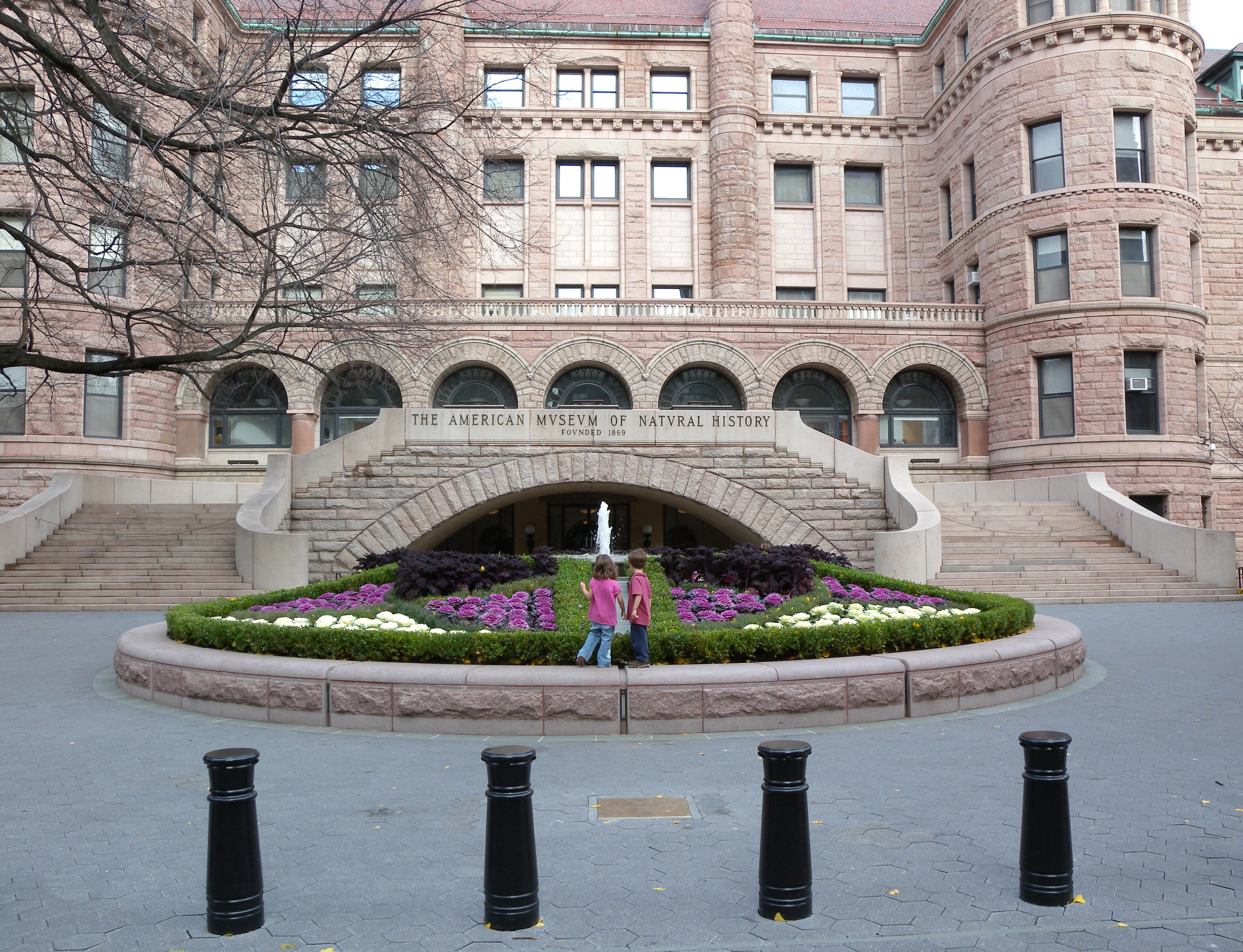
The old Romanesque Revival-style 77th Street entrance.

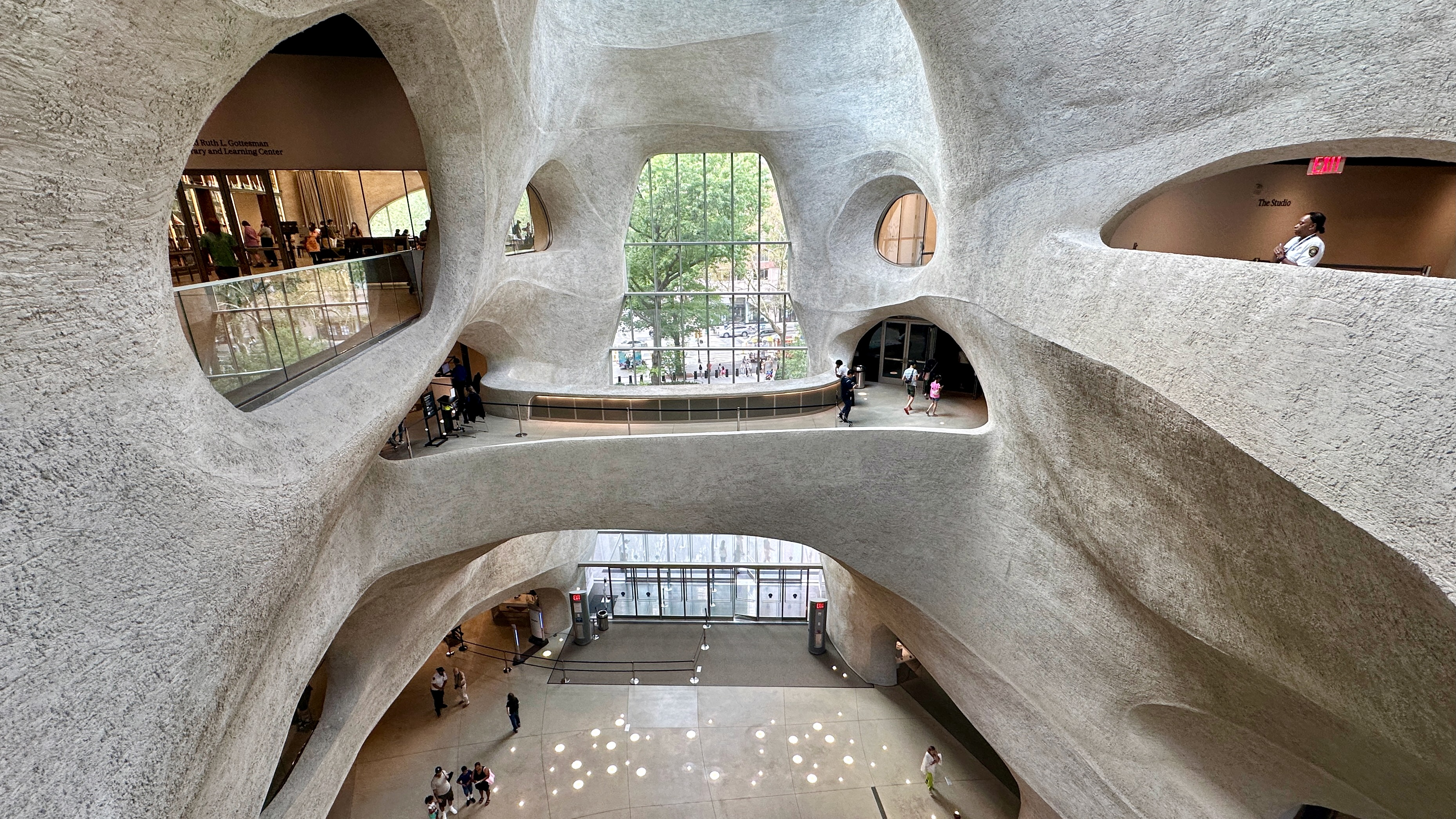
The central atrium of the Richard Gilder Center for Science, Education, and Innovation.

In 2001, the museum's lecture hall was renamed the Samuel J. and Ethel LeFrak Theater, after Samuel J. LeFrak donated US$8 million to the AMNH. The museum's south facade, spanning 77th Street from Central Park West to Columbus Avenue, was cleaned and repaired, re-emerging in 2009. Steven Reichl, a spokesman for the museum, said that work would include restoring 650 black-cherry window frames and stone repairs. The museum's consultant on the latest renovation was Wiss, Janney, Elstner Associates, Inc., an architectural and engineering firm with headquarters in Northbrook, Illinois. The museum also restored the mural in Roosevelt Memorial Hall in 2010.

In 2026, the AMNH received $2 million to help fund the renovation of the Pacific Birds Hall.

==== Richard Gilder Center ====
In 2014, the museum published plans for a $325 million, 195,000 ft^{2} (18,100 m^{2}) annex, the Richard Gilder Center for Science, Education, and Innovation, on the Columbus Avenue side. It was named after stockbroker and philanthropist Richard Gilder.

On October 11, 2016, the Landmarks Preservation Commission unanimously approved the expansion. Construction of the Gilder Center, which was expected to break ground the next year following design development and Environmental Impact Statement stages, would entail demolition of three museum buildings built between 1874 and 1935. The museum filed plans for the expansion in August 2017, but due to community opposition, construction did not start until June 2019.

On May 4, 2023, the Gilder Center opened, and the museum had 1.5 million visitors over the next three months. In 2025, the AMNH began providing free "Discoverer" memberships to Supplemental Nutrition Assistance Program recipients.

==== Native remains ====
In late 2023, the museum announced that it would stop displaying human remains from its collection. Despite the 1990 passage of the Native American Graves Protection and Repatriation Act (NAGPRA), as late as 2023, the AMNH held an estimated 1,900 Native American remains that had not been repatriated.

In January 2024, the museum closed a number of displays and the AMNH's Eastern Woodlands and Great Plains halls, or about 10,000 square feet. The museum agreed to repatriate the remains that July.

== Original structure ==
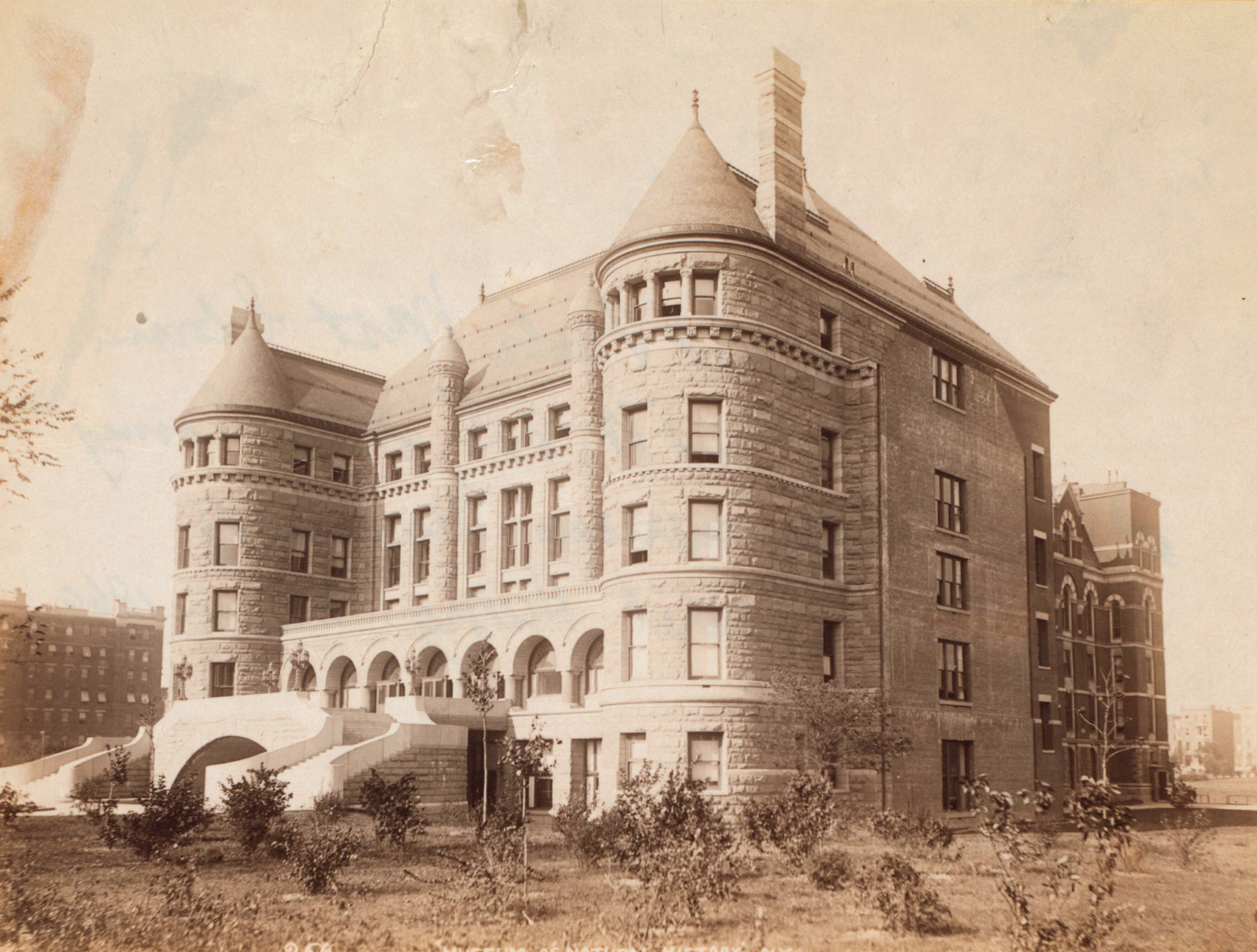
This building was completed by the end of the 19th century. The buildings beside this one would be complete in the early 20th century. Currently, this building houses (first floor to fourth floor) the Grand Gallery, Birds of the World, Primates, and the Wallach Orientation Center.

The original Victorian Gothic building was designed by Calvert Vaux and J. Wrey Mould, both already closely identified with the architecture of Central Park. Vaux and Mould's original plan was intended to complement the Metropolitan Museum of Art on the opposite side of Central Park. The original building, as constructed, was at the center of the 77th Street frontage and measured 199 by 66 feet (61 by 20 m) across; it featured a gallery measuring 112 feet (34 m) long200 ft (61 m) tall. This gallery contained a raised basement, three stories of exhibits, Venetian Gothic arches, and an attic with dormers and a slate roof. The rear of the gallery included two towers: one containing a stairwell and the other containing curators' rooms. The original structure still exists but is hidden from view by the many buildings in the complex that today occupy most of Manhattan Square. The museum remains accessible through its 77th Street foyer, which has since been renamed the Grand Gallery.

The full plan called for twelve pavilions similar in design to the original building. Eight pavilions would have been arranged as the sides of a square, while the remaining four would be perpendicular to each other in the interior of the square. There were to be eight towers along the perimeter of the square, as well as a 120 ft-wide (37 m) dome in the center, at the intersection of the four interior pavilions. In each pavilion, there was to be a ground floor; the second floor was to contain a gallery; the third floor was to exhibit specimens; and the fourth floor was to be used for research. Upon the intended completion of the master plan, the museum would measure 850 ft (260 m) from north to south and 650 ft (200 m) from west to east, including projections from the square. The finished structure, with a ground area of over 18 acres (7.3 ha), would have been the largest building in North America, as well as the largest museum building in the world. The master plan was never fully realized; by 2015, the museum consisted of 25 separate buildings that were poorly connected.

The original building was soon eclipsed by the west and east wings of the southern frontage, designed by J. Cleaveland Cady as a brownstone neo-Romanesque structure. It extends 700 ft (210 m) along West 77th Street, with corner towers 150 ft (46 m) tall. Its pink brownstone and granite, similar to that found at Grindstone Island in the St. Lawrence River, came from quarries at Picton Island, New York. The southern wing contains several halls ranging in size from 60 by 110 feet (18 m × 34 m) to 30 ft × 125 ft (9.1 m × 38.1 m). At the ends of either wings are rounded turret-like towers.

== New York State Memorial to Theodore Roosevelt ==
The main entrance hall on Central Park West is formally known as the New York State Memorial to Theodore Roosevelt. Completed by John Russell Pope in 1936, it is an over-scaled Beaux-Arts monument to former U.S. president Theodore Roosevelt. The hall was originally supposed to have formed one end of an "Intermuseum Promenade" through Central Park, connecting with the Metropolitan Museum of Art to the east, but the promenade was never completed.

The memorial hall has a pink-granite facade, which is modeled after Roman arches. In front of the hall on Central Park West is a terrace measuring 350 ft (110 m) long, as well as a series of steps. The main entrance consists of an arch measuring 60 ft (18 m) high. The underside of the arch is a coffered granite vestibule, which leads to a bronze, glass, and marble screen. It is flanked by two pairs of columns, which are topped by figures of American explorers John James Audubon, Daniel Boone, Meriwether Lewis, and William Clark. These figures were sculpted by James Earle Fraser and are about 30 ft (9.1 m) high. In the attic above the main archway, there is an inscription describing Roosevelt's accomplishments. The words "Truth", "Knowledge", and "Vision" are carved into the entablature under this inscription.

Fraser also designed an equestrian statue of Theodore Roosevelt, flanked by a Native American and an African American, which originally stood outside the memorial hall. In the 21st century, the statue generated controversy due to its subordinate depiction of these figures behind Roosevelt. This prompted AMNH officials to announce in 2020 that they would remove the statue. The statue was removed in January 2022 and will be on a long-term loan to the Theodore Roosevelt Presidential Library in North Dakota.

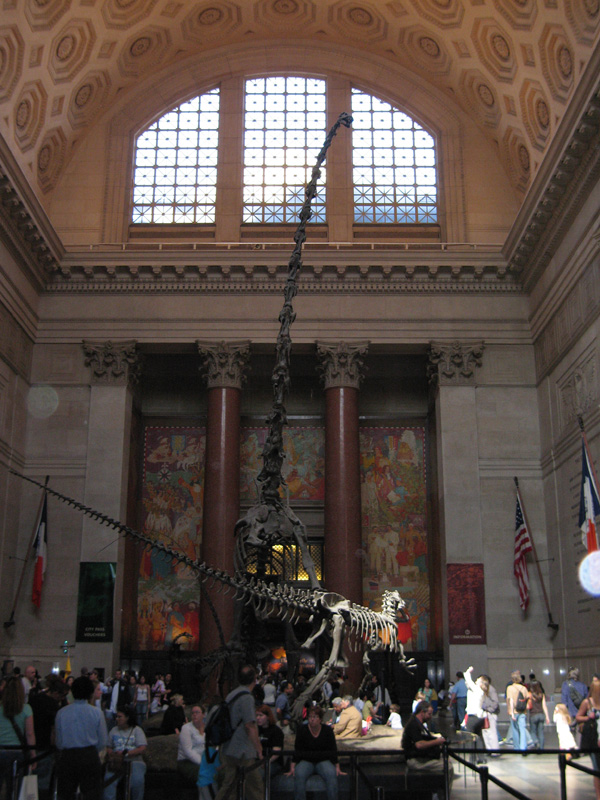
The Theodore Roosevelt Memorial Hall is the main ticketing lobby.

The interior of the Memorial Hall measures 67 by 120 ft (20 by 37 m) across, with a barrel-vaulted ceiling measuring 100 ft (30 m) tall. The ceiling contains octagonal coffers, while the floors are made of mosaic marble tiles. The lowest 9 ft (2.7 m) of the walls are wainscoted in marble, above which the walls of the memorial hall are made of limestone. The top of each wall contains a marble band and a Corinthian entablature. Each of the Memorial Hall's four sides contains two red-marble columns, each measuring 48 ft (15 m) tall and rising from a Botticino marble pedestal. There are rounded windows at clerestory level on the north and south walls. William Andrew MacKay designed three 62 ft-wide (19 m) murals depicting important events in Roosevelt's life: the construction of the Panama Canal on the north wall, African exploration on the west wall, and the Treaty of Portsmouth on the south wall. The east and west walls, contain four quotes from Roosevelt under the headings "Nature", "Manhood", "Youth", and "The State".

The Memorial Hall originally connected to various classrooms, exhibition rooms, and a 600-person auditorium. Directly underneath the Memorial Hall is an entrance to the 81st Street–Museum of Natural History station. Today, the hall connects to the Akeley Hall of African Mammals and the Hall of Asian Mammals. The Memorial Hall contains four exhibits that describe Theodore Roosevelt's conservation activities in his youth, early adulthood, U.S. presidency, and post-presidency.

== Mammal halls ==
=== Old World mammals ===
Gorilla diarama at AMNH.

==== Akeley Hall of African Mammals ====
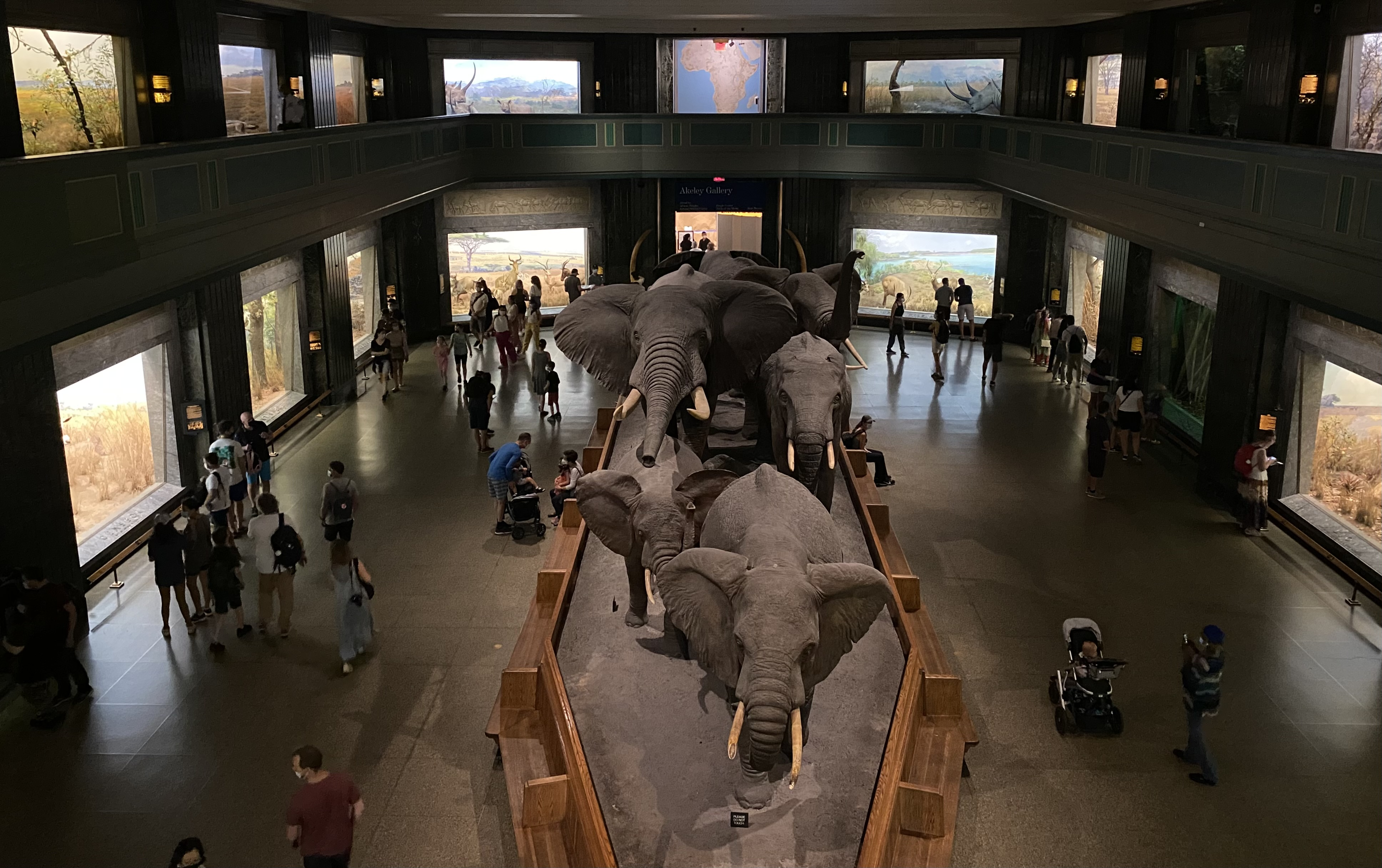
Akeley Hall of African Mammals

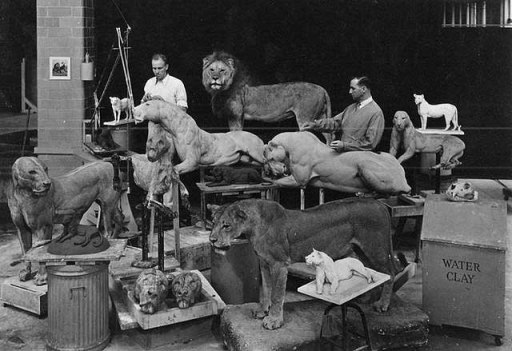
James L. Clark (right) and assistants mount specimens for the "Lions" diorama

Named after taxidermist Carl Akeley, the Akeley Hall of African Mammals is a two-story hall on the second floor, directly west of the Theodore Roosevelt Memorial Hall. It connects to the Hall of African Peoples to the west. The Hall of African Mammals' 28 dioramas depict in meticulous detail the great range of ecosystems found in Africa and the mammals endemic to them. The centerpiece of the hall is a herd of eight African elephants in a characteristic 'alarmed' formation. Though the mammals are typically the main feature in the dioramas, birds and flora of the regions are occasionally featured as well. The hall in its current form was completed in 1936.

The Hall of African Mammals was first proposed to the museum by Carl Akeley around 1909; he proposed 40 dioramas featuring the rapidly vanishing landscapes and animals of Africa. Daniel Pomeroy, a trustee of the museum and partner at J.P. Morgan & Co., offered investors the opportunity to accompany the museum's expeditions in Africa in exchange for funding. Akeley began collecting specimens for the hall as early as 1909, famously encountering Theodore Roosevelt in the midst of the Smithsonian-Roosevelt African expedition. On these early expeditions, Akeley was accompanied by his former apprentice in taxidermy, James L. Clark, and artist, William R. Leigh. When Akeley returned to Africa to collect gorillas for the hall's first diorama, Clark remained behind and began scouring the country for artists to create the backgrounds. The eventual appearance of the first habitat groups impacted the design of other diorama halls, including Birds of the World, the Hall of North American Mammals, the Vernay Hall of Southeast Asian Mammals, and the Hall of Oceanic Life.

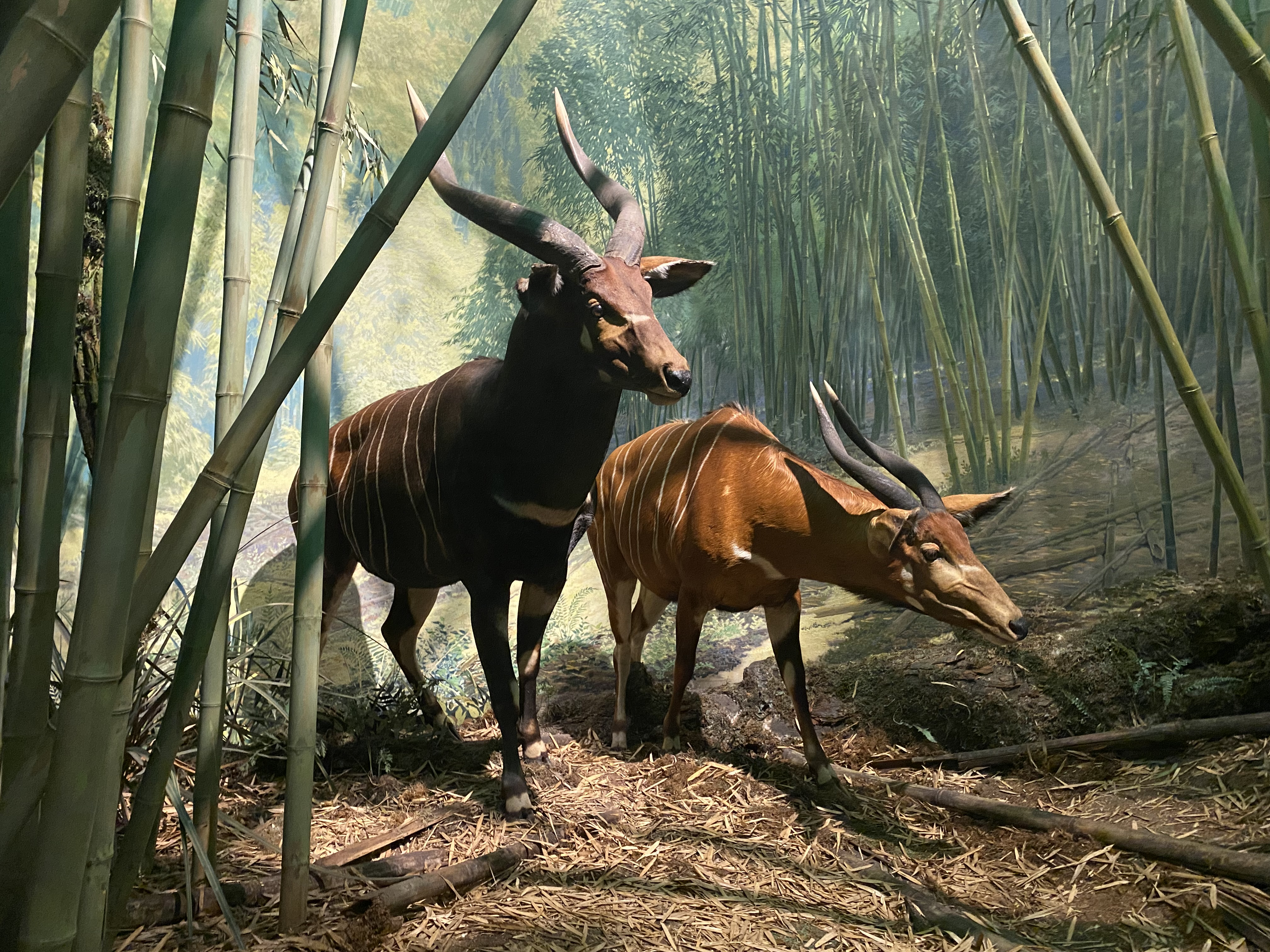
Diorama of Bongo antelopes in the Hall of African Mammals

After Akeley's unexpected death during the Eastman-Pomeroy expedition in 1926, responsibility of the hall's completion fell to James L. Clark, who hired architectural artist James Perry Wilson in 1933 to assist Leigh in the painting of backgrounds. Wilson made many improvements on Leigh's techniques, including a range of methods to minimize the distortion caused by the dioramas' curved walls. In 1936, William Durant Campbell, a wealthy board member with a desire to see Africa, offered to fund several dioramas if allowed to obtain the specimens himself. Clark agreed to this arrangement, resulting in the acquisition of numerous large specimens. Kane joined Leigh, Wilson, and several other artists in completing the hall's remaining dioramas. Though construction of the hall was completed in 1936, the dioramas gradually opened between the mid-1920s and early 1940s.

Species and locations represented in Akeley Hall
Location	Species
Angola (Upper Cuango and Luando Rivers)	Giant sable antelope
Botswana (Kalahari Desert)	Gemsbok
Cameroon (Bipindi)	Mandrill; Gaboon viper
Ethiopia (Addis Ababa)	Mountain nyala
Ivory Coast (Cavalla River)	Chimpanzee
Kenya (Aberdare Mountains)	Bongo; Giant forest hog
(Mount Kenya)	African buffalo; Cattle egret
(Ewaso Ng'iro)	Reticulated Giraffe; Grevy's zebra; Northern Grant's gazelle (listed as Rainey's gazelle); Beisa oryx
(Nairobi)	Ostrich; Common warthog; Elephant shrew
(Lukenya Hills)	Klipspringer; Olive baboon; Mountain reedbuck; Yellow-spotted rock hyrax
Libya (Libyan Desert)	Scimitar oryx; Addra gazelle; Addax
Mozambique (Zambezi River)	Cheetah
DR Congo (Ituri Rainforest)	Okapi
(Kivu Mountain)	Mountain gorilla
(Uele River)	White rhinoceros; Crested porcupine
Sudan (Lake No)	Hippopotamus; Sitatunga; White eared kob; Waterbuck; Roan antelope; Nile lechwe; Shoebill
(Bahr el Ghazal)	Giant eland; Standard-winged nightjar
Tanzania (Mount Kilimanjaro)	Greater kudu
(Serengeti Plains)	Blue wildebeest; Plains zebra; Lichtenstein's hartebeest (listed as bubal hartebeest); Topi; Eland; Thomson's gazelle; Grant's gazelle
(Lake Victoria)	Lion
(Gulave)	Lesser kudu; Gerenuk; Dik-dik; Vulturine guineafowl
Unknown	Black wildebeest; Blesbok; Springbok; Leopard; Bushpig; Mantled guereza (listed as white-mantled colobus); Black rhinoceros; Red-billed oxpecker; Spotted hyena; Black-backed jackal; Lappet-faced vulture; Rüppell's vulture; White-backed vulture; Hooded vulture; Marabou stork; White-necked raven; Impala; Hedgehog

==== Hall of Asian Mammals ====
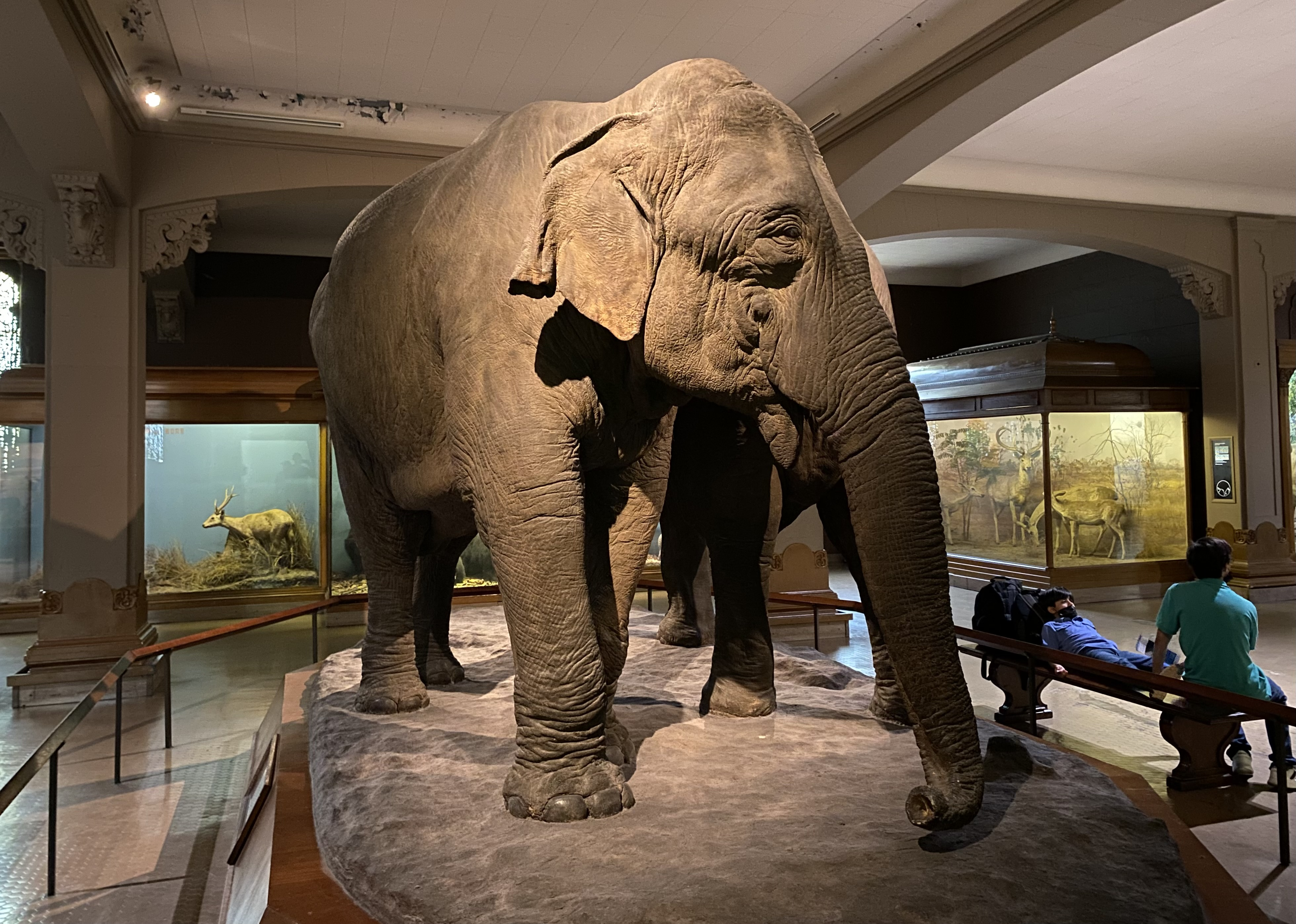
Indian elephant in the Hall of Asian Mammals

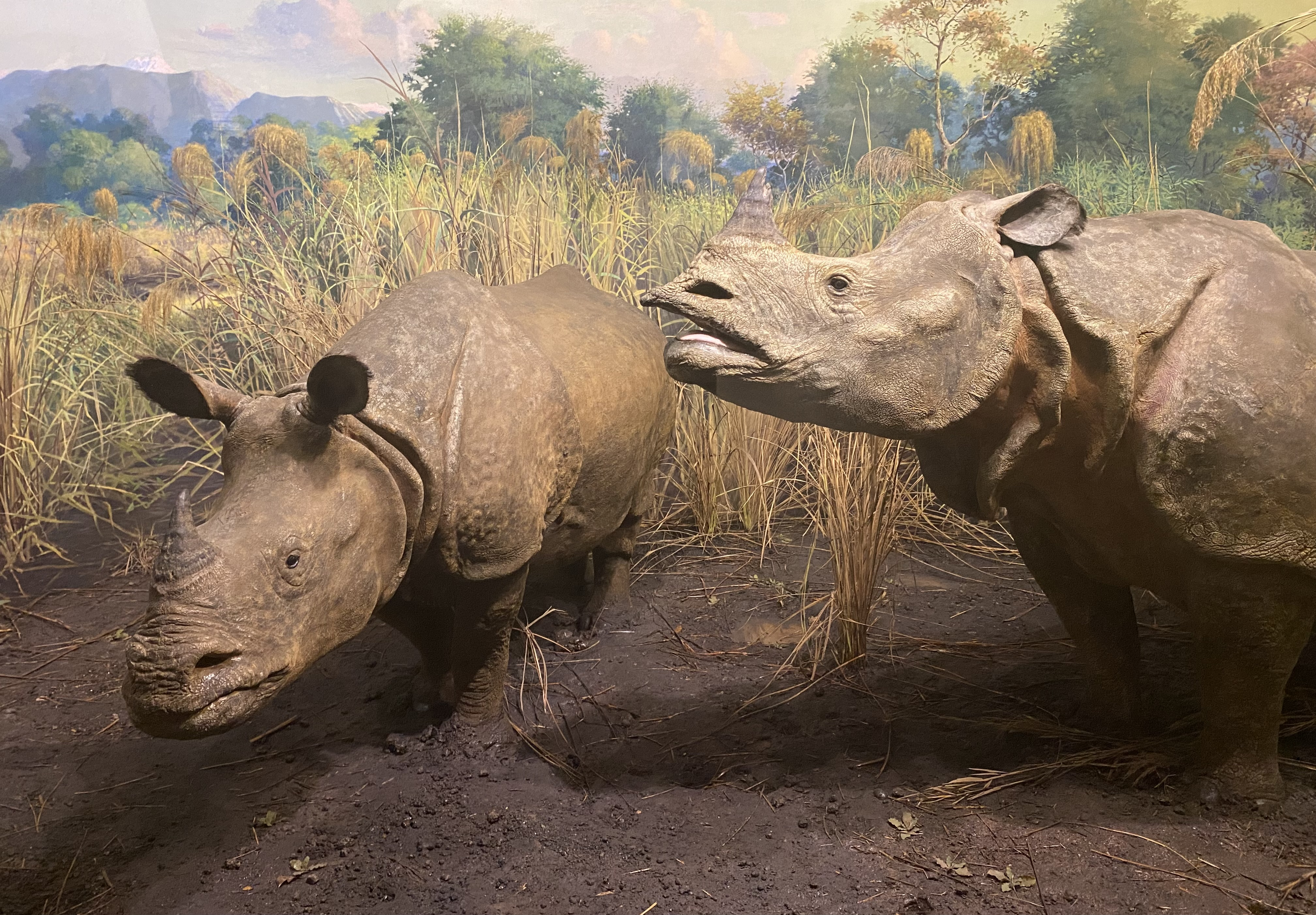
Indian rhinoceros diorama in the Hall of Asian Mammals

The Hall of Asian Mammals, sometimes referred to as the Vernay-Faunthorpe Hall of Asian Mammals, is directly south of the Theodore Roosevelt Memorial Hall. It contains 8 complete dioramas, 4 partial dioramas, and 6 habitat groups of mammals and locations from India, Nepal, Burma, and Malaysia. The hall opened in 1930 and, similar to the Akeley Hall of African Mammals, is centered around 2 Asian elephants. At one point, a giant panda and Siberian tiger were also part of the Hall's collection, originally intended to be part of an adjoining Hall of North Asian Mammals (planned in the current location of Stout Hall of Asian Peoples). These specimens can currently be seen in the Hall of Biodiversity.

Specimens for the Hall of Asian Mammals were collected over six expeditions led by British-born antiques dealer Arthur S. Vernay and Col. John Faunthorpe (as noted by stylized plaques at both entrances). The expeditions were funded entirely by Vernay, who characterized the expense as a British tribute to American involvement in World War I. The first Vernay-Faunthorpe expedition took place in 1922, when many of the animals Vernay was seeking, such as the Sumatran rhinoceros and Asiatic lion, were facing the possibility of extinction. Vernay made many appeals to regional authorities to obtain hunting permits; in later museum-related expeditions headed by Vernay, these appeals helped the museum gain access to areas previously restricted to foreign visitors. Artist Clarence C. Rosenkranz accompanied the Vernay-Faunthorpe expeditions as field artist and painted the majority of the diorama backgrounds in the hall. These expeditions were also well documented in both photo and video, with enough footage of the first expedition to create a feature-length film, Hunting Tigers in India (1929).

Species and Locations Represented in the Hall of Asian Mammals
India (Assam)	Hoolock gibbon	
–	Thamin	
(Awadh)	Sambar	Barasingha
–	Chital	
(Bhopal)	Sambar	Dhole (listed as wild dog)
(Bikanir)	Blackbuck	Chinkara
(Biligiriranga Hills, listed as Kallegal Range)	Leopard	
(Mysore)	Gaur	Indian roller
(Manas River)	Wild water buffalo	
Nepal (Base of the Himalayas)	Tiger	
(Morang)	Indian rhinoceros	
Burma (Rangoon)	Banteng	
Habitat groups
Sloth bear
Four-horned antelope	Smooth-coated otter	
Muntjac	Spotted chevrotain	
Sumatran rhinoceros
Hog deer	Indian wild boar	
Asiatic lion

=== New World mammals ===
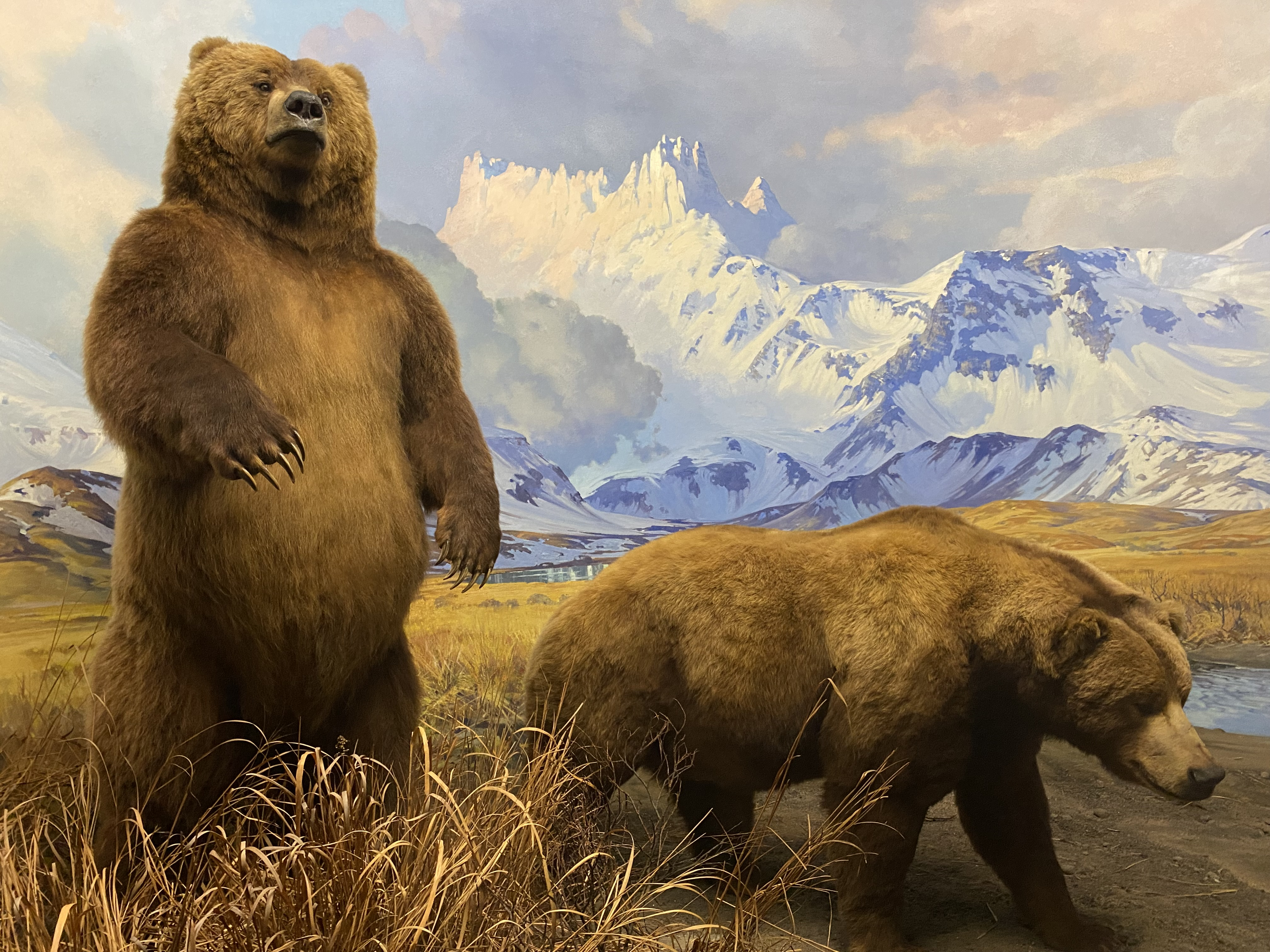
Diorama of Alaska Peninsula brown bears in the Hall of North American Mammals

==== Bernard Family Hall of North American Mammals ====
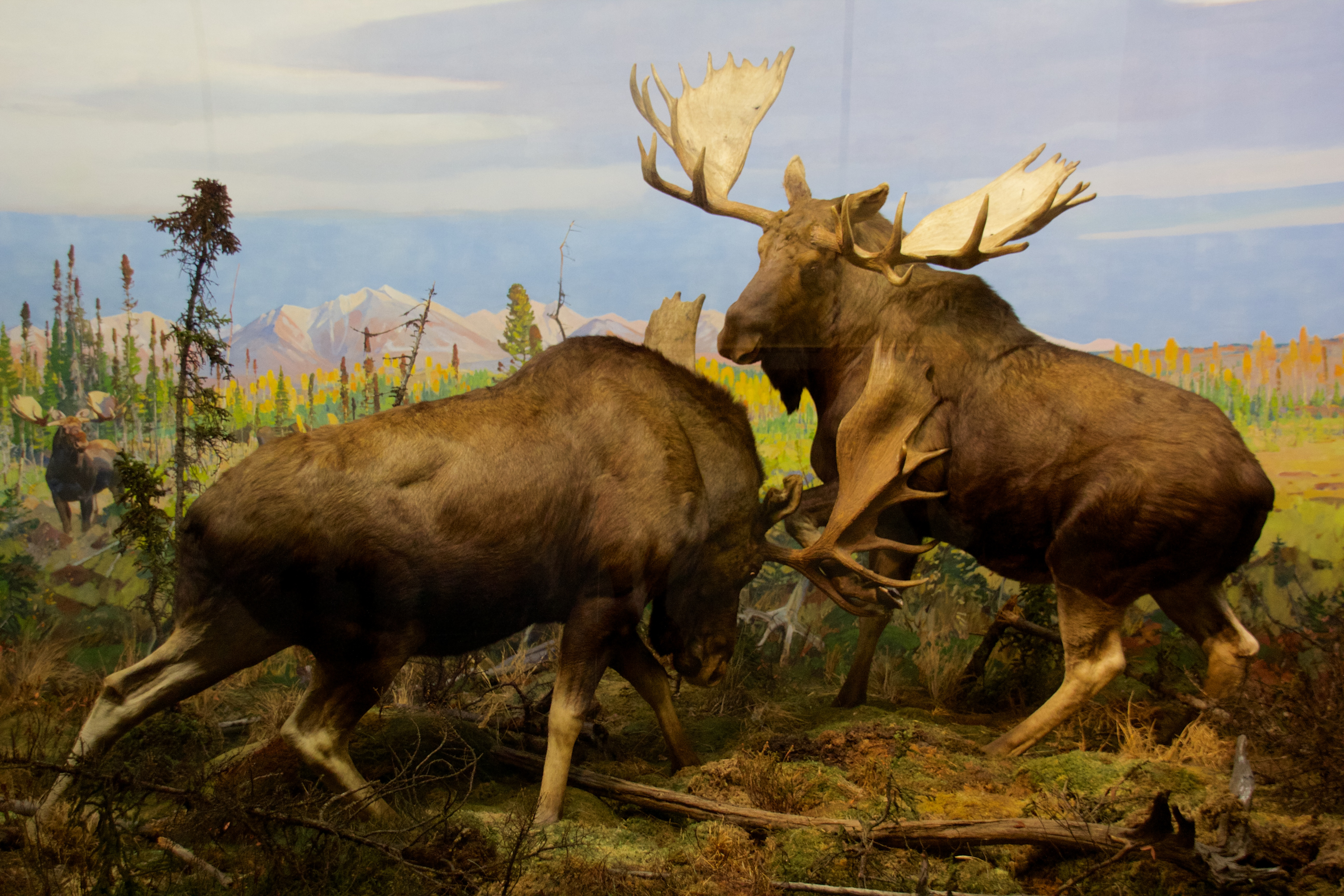
Alaska moose diorama in the Hall of North American Mammals

The Bernard Family Hall of North American Mammals is on the first floor, directly west of the Theodore Roosevelt Memorial Hall. features 43 dioramas of various mammals of the American continent, north of tropical Mexico. Each diorama places focus on a particular species, ranging from the largest megafauna to the smaller rodents and carnivorans. Notable dioramas include the Alaskan brown bears looking at a salmon after they scared off an otter, a pair of wolves, a pair of Sonoran jaguars, and dueling bull Alaska moose.

The Hall of North American Mammals opened in 1942 with only ten dioramas. Another 16 dioramas were added in 1963. A massive restoration project began in late 2011 following a large donation from Jill and Lewis Bernard. In October 2012 the hall was reopened as the Bernard Hall of North American Mammals.

Species and Locations Represented in the Hall of North American Mammals
Alaska	Ice age mammals of Alaska	
California	Ice age mammals of California	
Canoe Bay, Alaska Peninsula	Alaska Peninsula brown bear	
Kenai Peninsula, Alaska	Moose	
North Platte River, Wyoming	American bison	Pronghorn
Yellowstone National Park, Wyoming	Grizzly bear	
Mount Wilcox (Alberta), Jasper National Park, Alberta, Canada	Bighorn sheep	
Devils Tower, Wyoming	Mule deer	
Ellesmere Island, Nunavut, Canada	Muskox	
Tongass National Forest, Alaska	Mountain goat	
Near Tucson, Arizona	Antelope jackrabbit	Black-tailed jackrabbit
Near Lake Placid, Florida	American black bear	Cottonmouth
Ithaca, New York	Eastern cottontail	
Lake Gunflint, Superior National Forest, Northern Minnesota	Wolf	
Shiprock, New Mexico	Western spotted skunk	Ringtail
Yosemite National Park, California	Coyote	
Bear Mountain State Park, New York	White-tailed deer	
Minnies Lake, Georgia	Raccoon	
Hoister Creek, Michigan	North American beaver	
Mount Rainier National Park, Washington	Mountain beaver	
Gaspésie National Park, Quebec, Canada	Canada lynx	Snowshoe hare
Rogue River, Oregon	Western gray squirrel	
Grand Canyon, Arizona	Cougar	
White River National Forest, Colorado	Wapiti	
Guaymas, Sonora, Mexico	Jaguar	
Denali National Park, Alaska	Dall sheep	
Level Mountain, British Columbia, Canada	Osborn caribou	
Alaska	Grant caribou	

===== Hall of Small Mammals =====
The Hall of Small Mammals is an offshoot of the Bernard Family Hall of North American Mammals, directly to the west of the latter. There are several small dioramas featuring small mammals found throughout North America, including collared peccaries, Abert's squirrel, and a wolverine.

Species and Locations Represented in the Hall of Small Mammals
Kaibab National Forest, Arizona	Abert's squirrel	
Jackson Hole, Wyoming	American badger	
Crater Lake National Park, Oregon	Pacific marten	
Pine Barrens (New Jersey)	American mink	
Wind Cave National Park, South Dakota	Black-footed ferret	
Big Bend National Park, Texas	Collared peccary	
Baxter State Park, Maine	American Ermine	Southern red-backed vole
Great Smoky Mountains National Park, Tennessee	Gray fox	Virginia opossum
Cohocton, New York	Groundhog	
Santa Ana National Wildlife Refuge, Texas	Nine-banded armadillo	
Trapper Peak (Montana)	Northern flying squirrel	
Algonquin Provincial Park	North American river otter	
Delaware Water Gap, New Jersey	Striped skunk	
Ennadai Lake, Nunavut, Canada	Wolverine	

== Birds, reptiles, and amphibian halls ==
=== Sanford Hall of North American Birds ===
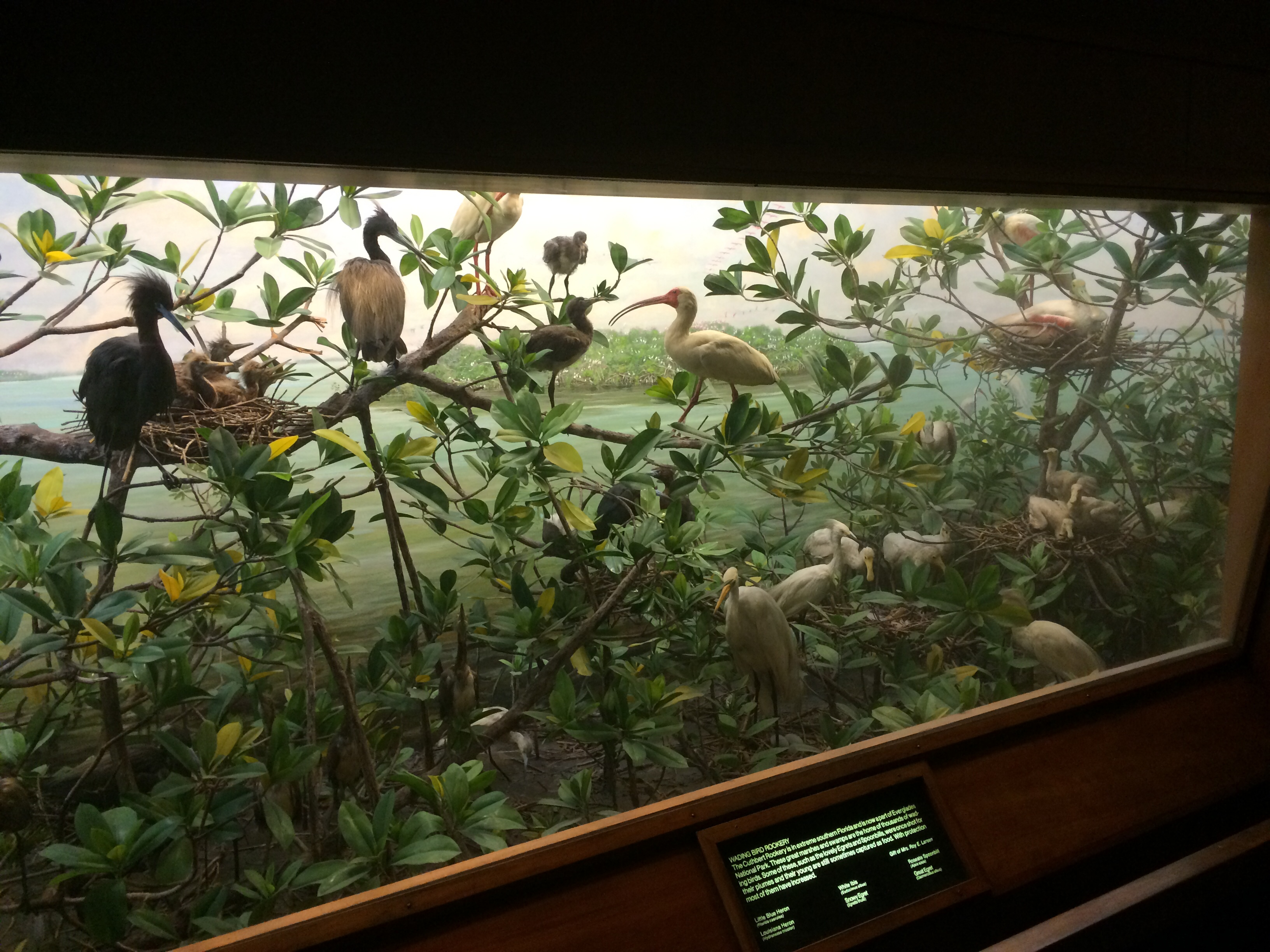
The Cuthbert Rookery Diorama contains many of the birds once endangered by plume hunting.

The Sanford Hall of North American birds is a one-story hall on the third floor, between the Hall of Primates and Akeley Hall's second level. There are over 20 dioramas depicting birds from across North America in their native habitats. At the far end of the hall is an old mural of pink flamingos by ornithologist and artist Louis Agassiz Fuertes. The hall also has display cases devoted to large collections of warblers, owls, and raptors.

Conceived by museum ornithologist Frank Chapman, the Hall is named for Chapman's friend and amateur ornithologist Leonard C. Sanford, who partially funded the hall and also donated the entirety of his own bird specimen collection to the museum. Construction began on the hall's dioramas as early as 1902, and the dioramas opened in 1909. They were the first to be exhibited in the museum and are the oldest still on display. The hall was refurbished in 1962.

Although Chapman was not the first to create museum dioramas, he was the first to bring artists into the field with him in the hopes of capturing a specific location at a specific time. In contrast to the dramatic scenes that Akeley created for the African Hall, Chapman wanted his dioramas to evoke a scientific realism, ultimately serving as a historical record of habitats and species facing a high probability of extinction. Each of Chapman's dioramas depicted a species, their nests, and 4 ft (1.2 m) of the surrounding habitat in each direction.

Species and locations represented in Sanford Hall												
"Eastern Upland Gamebirds"	Ruffed grouse	Northern bobwhite	American woodcock	Ring-necked pheasant								
"Booming grounds", Central Wisconsin	Greater prairie chicken											
"Western Gamebirds", Sierra Foothills	Mountain quail	California quail	Band-tailed pigeon	Sage grouse	Blue grouse	Chukar partridge	Mountain bluebird					
"Marsh Ducks in Spring"	Green-winged teal	Gadwall	Fulvous whistling duck	Hooded merganser	Baldpate	Mallard	Northern shoveler	American black duck	Cinnamon teal	Yellowthroat		
"Sea Ducks in Winter"	Ring-necked duck	Steller's eider	Bufflehead	Long-tailed duck (oldsquaw)	Canvasback	Harlequin duck	Redhead	Common goldeneye	Red-breasted merganser	Common merganser	King eider	
Cap Tourmente, Quebec	Snow goose											
Umbagog Lake, New Hampshire	Common loon											
"Desert Birds"	Gambel's quail	Lesser nighthawk	Verdin	Curve-billed thrasher	Gnatcatcher	Pyrrhuloxia	Cactus wren	Greater Roadrunner	Northern Cardinal	Black-throated sparrow	Scaled quail	Mourning dove
Crane Lake, Saskatchewan	Canada goose											
Everglades, Florida	Wood stork	Limpkin										
Lake Louise, Canadian Rockies	Gray-crowned rosy finch	White-tailed ptarmigan	American pipit	Horned lark								
Upper Klamath Lake, California	California gull	American white pelican	Caspian tern	Ring-billed gull	Double-crested cormorant							
Heron Lake, Minnesota	Whooping crane											
Medicine Bow Mountains, Wyoming	Golden eagle											
Cay Verde, The Bahamas	Brown booby	Magnificent frigatebird										
Monterey, California	Brandt's cormorant											
Brigantine, New Jersey	American yellow warbler	Whimbrel	Great blue heron	Clapper rail	Black skimmer	Common tern	Red-winged blackbird	Laughing gull	Willet	Ruddy turnstone		
South Carolina	Great egret											
Potomac River	Great horned owl											
Unidentified marsh, Florida	Sandhill crane											
Port St. Lucie, Florida	Snakebird											
Montauk, New York	Labrador duck											
West Virginia	Wild turkey											
Chilkat River, Alaska	Bald eagle											
Undisclosed Location
Peregrine falcon	Feral pigeon											
Barn swallow	Tree swallow	Bobolink	Red-winged blackbird	Wood duck	Bank swallow	Swamp sparrow	Marsh wren	Sora				
California condor

=== Hall of Birds of the World ===
The Hall of Birds of the World is on the south side of the second floor. The global diversity of bird species is exhibited in this hall. 12 dioramas showcase various ecosystems around the world and provide a sample of the varieties of birds that live there. Example dioramas include South Georgia featuring king penguins and skuas, the East African plains featuring secretarybirds and bustards, and the Australian outback featuring honeyeaters, cockatoos, and kookaburras.

=== Whitney Memorial Hall of Oceanic Birds ===
The Whitney Memorial Wing, originally named after Harry Payne Whitney and comprising 750,000 birds, opened in 1939. Later known as the Hall of Oceanic Birds, it was completed and dedicated in 1953. It was founded by Frank Chapman and Leonard C. Sanford, originally museum volunteers, who had gone forward with creation of a hall to feature birds of the Pacific islands. The hall was designed as a completely immersive collection of dioramas, including a circular display featuring birds-of-paradise. In 1998, the Butterfly Conservatory was installed inside the hall.

=== Hall of Reptiles and Amphibians ===
The Hall of Reptiles and Amphibians is near the southeast corner of the third floor. It serves as an introduction to herpetology, with many exhibits detailing reptile evolution, anatomy, diversity, reproduction, and behavior. Notable exhibits include a Komodo dragon group, an American alligator, Lonesome George, the last Pinta Island tortoise, and poison dart frogs.

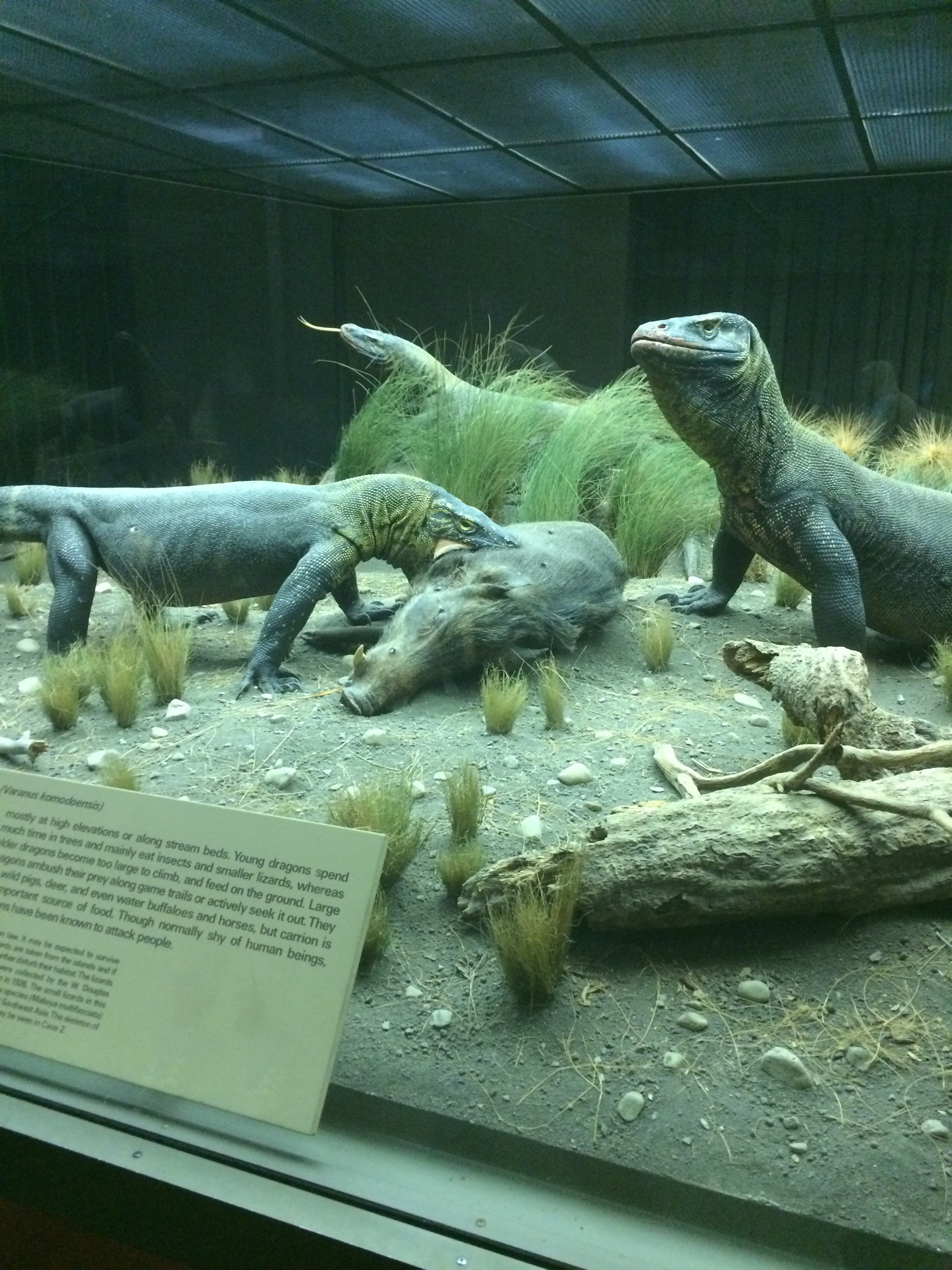
The Komodo dragon diorama featuring a group feeding on a wild boar carcass in the Hall of Reptiles and Amphibians.

In 1926, W. Douglas Burden, F.J. Defosse, and Emmett Reid Dunn collected specimens of the Komodo Dragon for the museum. Burden's chapter "The Komodo Dragon", in Look to the Wilderness, describes the expedition, the habitat, and the behavior of the dragon. The hall opened in 1927 and was rebuilt from 1969 to 1977 at a cost of $1.3 million.

== Biodiversity and environmental halls ==
=== Hall of Biodiversity ===
The Hall of Biodiversity is underneath the Theodore Roosevelt Memorial Hall. It opened in May 1998. The hall primarily contains exhibits and objects highlighting the concept of biodiversity, the interactions between living organisms, and the negative impacts of extinction on biodiversity. The hall includes a 2,500 ft^{2} (230 m^{2}) diorama depicting the Dzanga-Sangha Special Reserve rainforest with over 160 animal and plant species. The diorama shows the rainforest in three states: pristine, altered by human activity, and destroyed by human activity. Another attraction in the hall is "The Spectrum of Habitats", a video wall displaying footage of nine ecosystems. There is a "Transformation Wall", containing information and stories detailing changes to biodiversity, and a "Solutions Wall", containing suggestions on how to increase biodiversity.

=== Hall of North American Forests ===
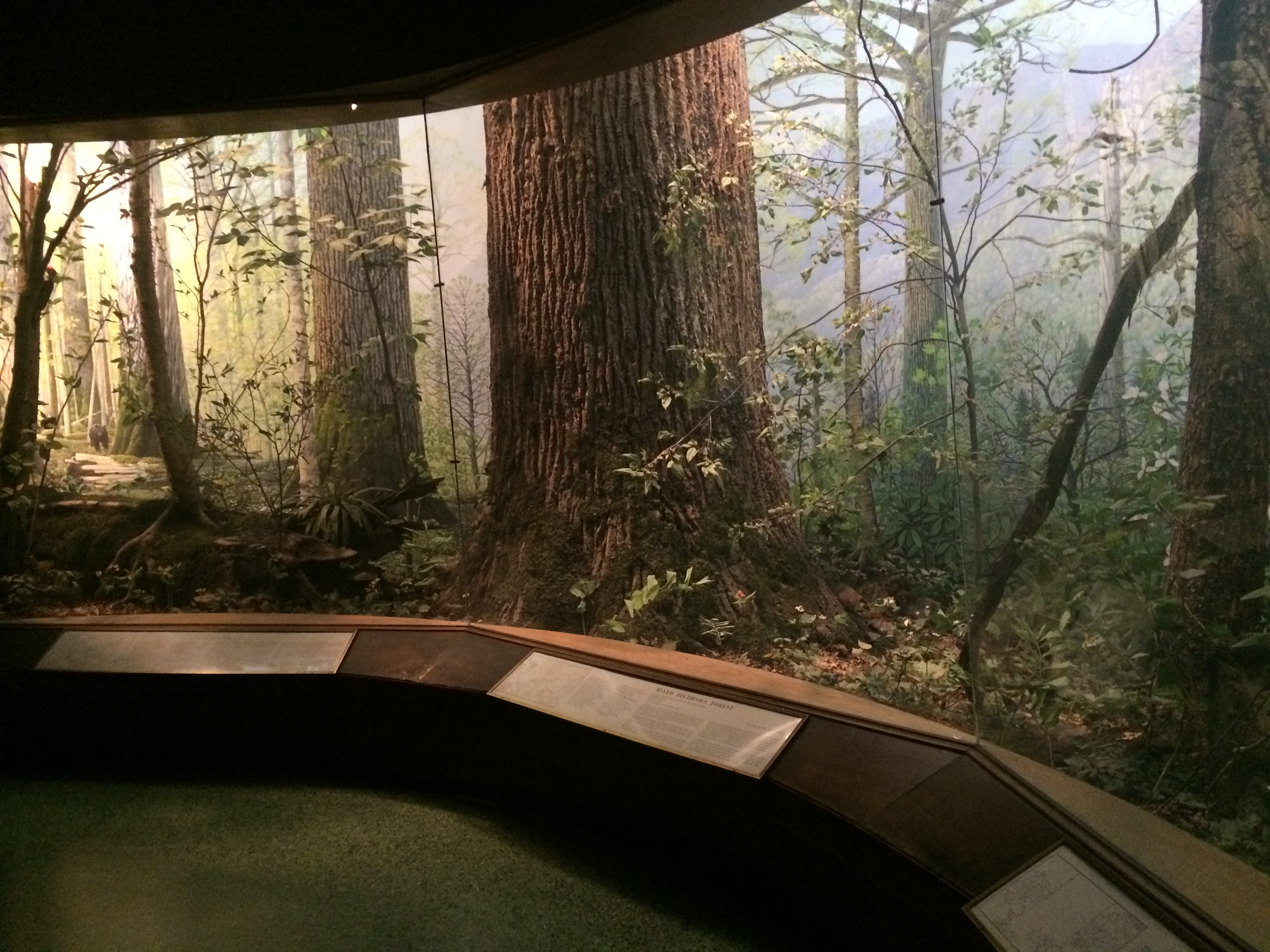
The Mixed Deciduous Forest diorama

The Hall of North American Forests is a one-story hall on the museum's first floor in between the Theodore Roosevelt Memorial Hall and the Warburg Hall of New York State Environments. It contains ten dioramas depicting a range of forest types from across North America as well as several displays on forest conservation and tree health. The hall was constructed under the guidance of botanist Henry K. Svenson and opened in 1958. Each diorama specifically lists both the location and exact time of year depicted. Trees and plants featured in the dioramas are constructed of a combination of art supplies and actual bark and other specimens collected in the field. The entrance to the hall features a cross section from the Mark Twain Tree, 1,400-year-old sequoia taken from the King's River grove on the west flank of the Sierra Mountains in 1891.

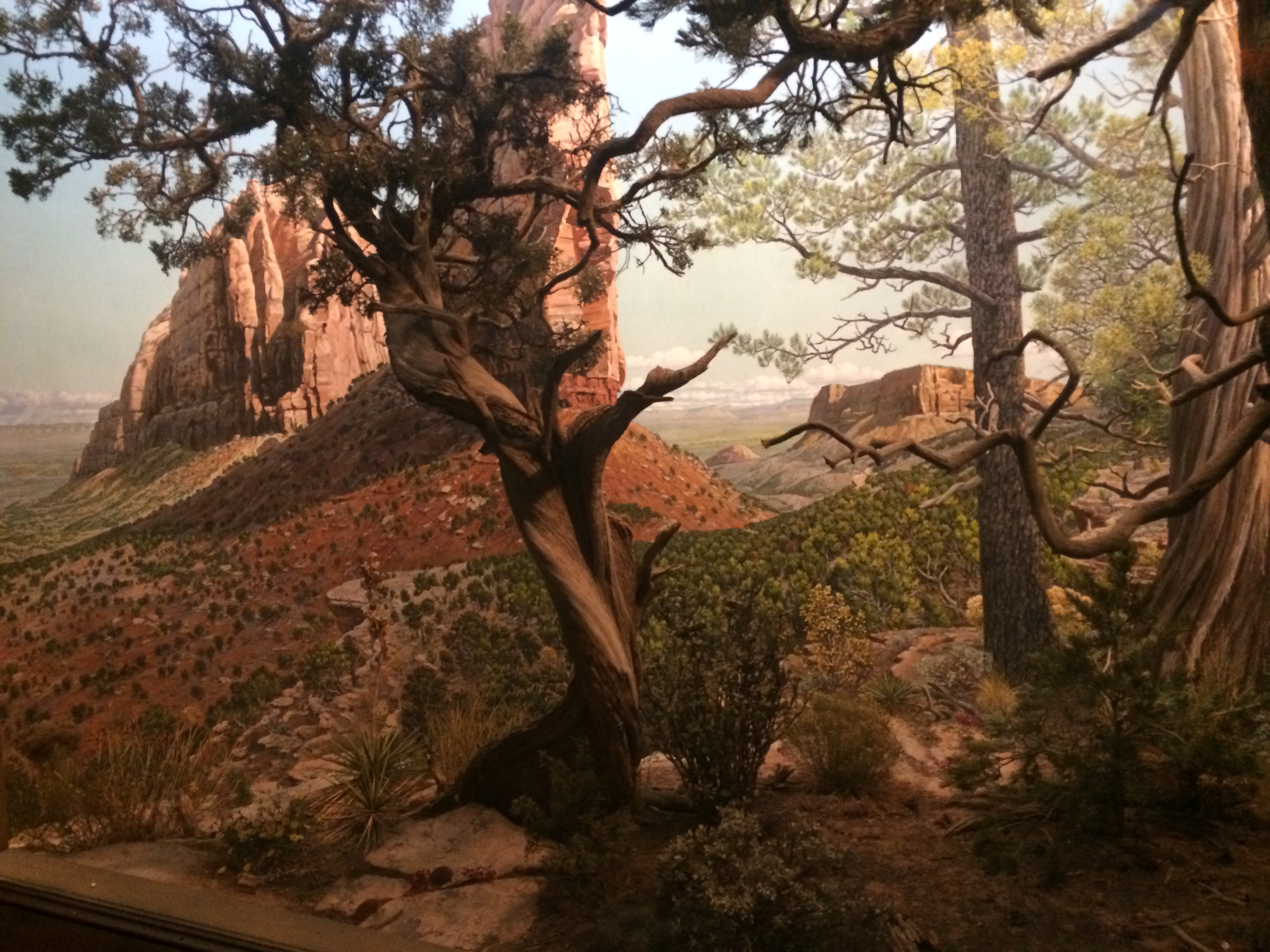
The Juniper Forest diorama

Locations Represented in the Hall of North American Forests	
Oak-Hickory Forest in late August	Ozark Plateau
Northern Spruce-Fir in mid-August	Lake Nipigon
Jeffrey Pine Forest in early June	Inyo National Forest
Olympic Rain Forest in mid-June	Quinault Rainforest
Timberline of the Northern Rocky Mountains in mid-July	Logan Pass
Pinyon-Juniper Woodland in early October	Colorado National Monument
Giant Cactus Forest in mid-April	Saguaro National Park
Southeastern Coastal Plain Forest in mid-March	Coosawhatchie River, South Carolina
Mixed Deciduous Forest in late April	Great Smoky Mountains National Park
Early October in Southern New Hampshire	Lake Sunapee

=== Warburg Hall of New York State Environments ===
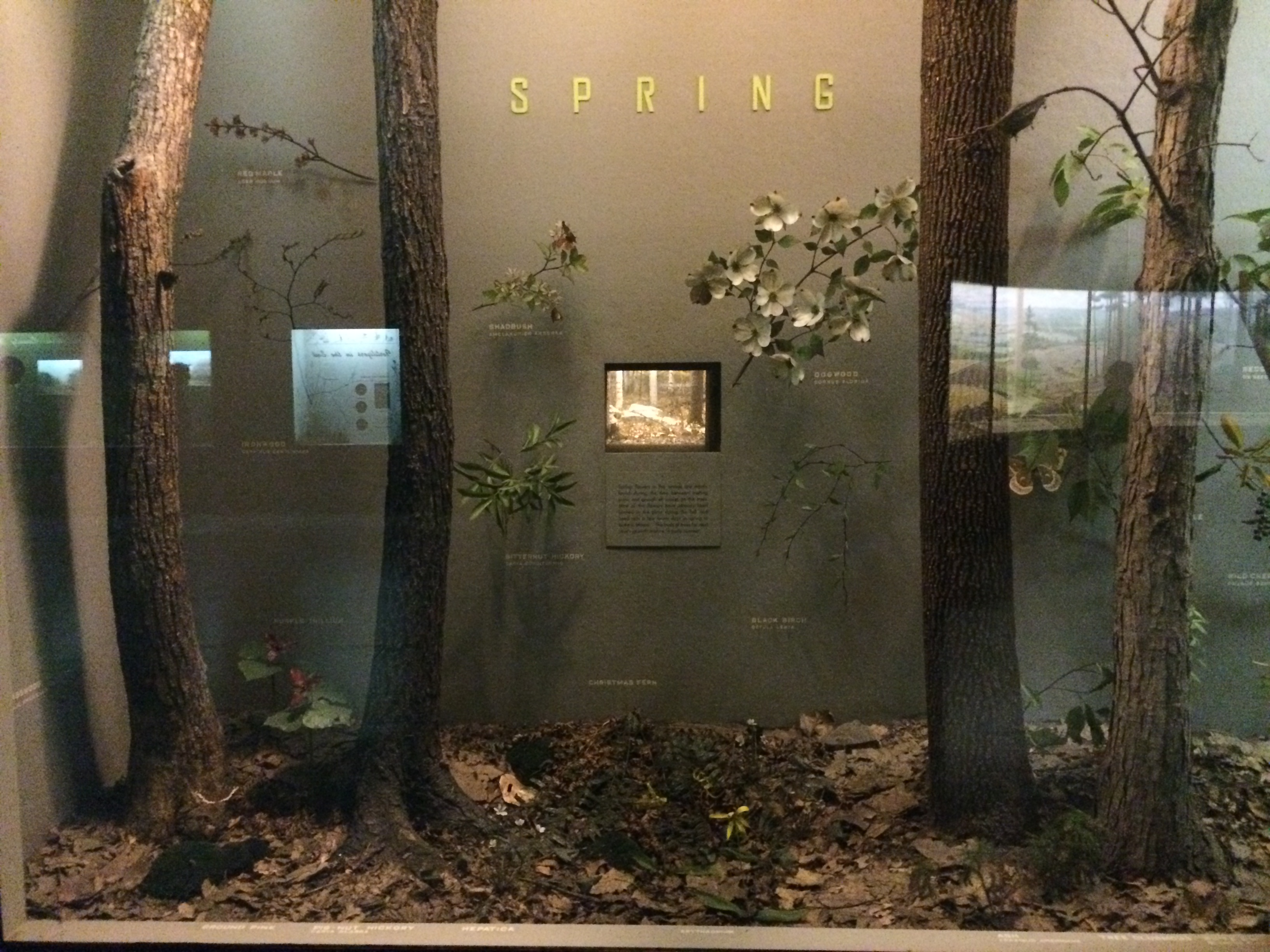
"Spring" display in Warburg Hall

Warburg Hall of New York State Environments is a one-story hall on the museum's ground floor in between the Hall of North American Forests and the Grand Hall. Based on the town of Pine Plains in Dutchess County, New York, the hall gives a multi-faceted presentation of the eco-systems typical of New York. Aspects covered include soil types, seasonal changes, and the impact of both humans and nonhuman animals on the environment. It is named for the German-American philanthropist Felix M. Warburg and opened on May 14, 1951, as the Warburg Memorial Hall of General Ecology. It has changed little since and is now frequently regarded for its retro-modern styling.

=== Milstein Hall of Ocean Life ===
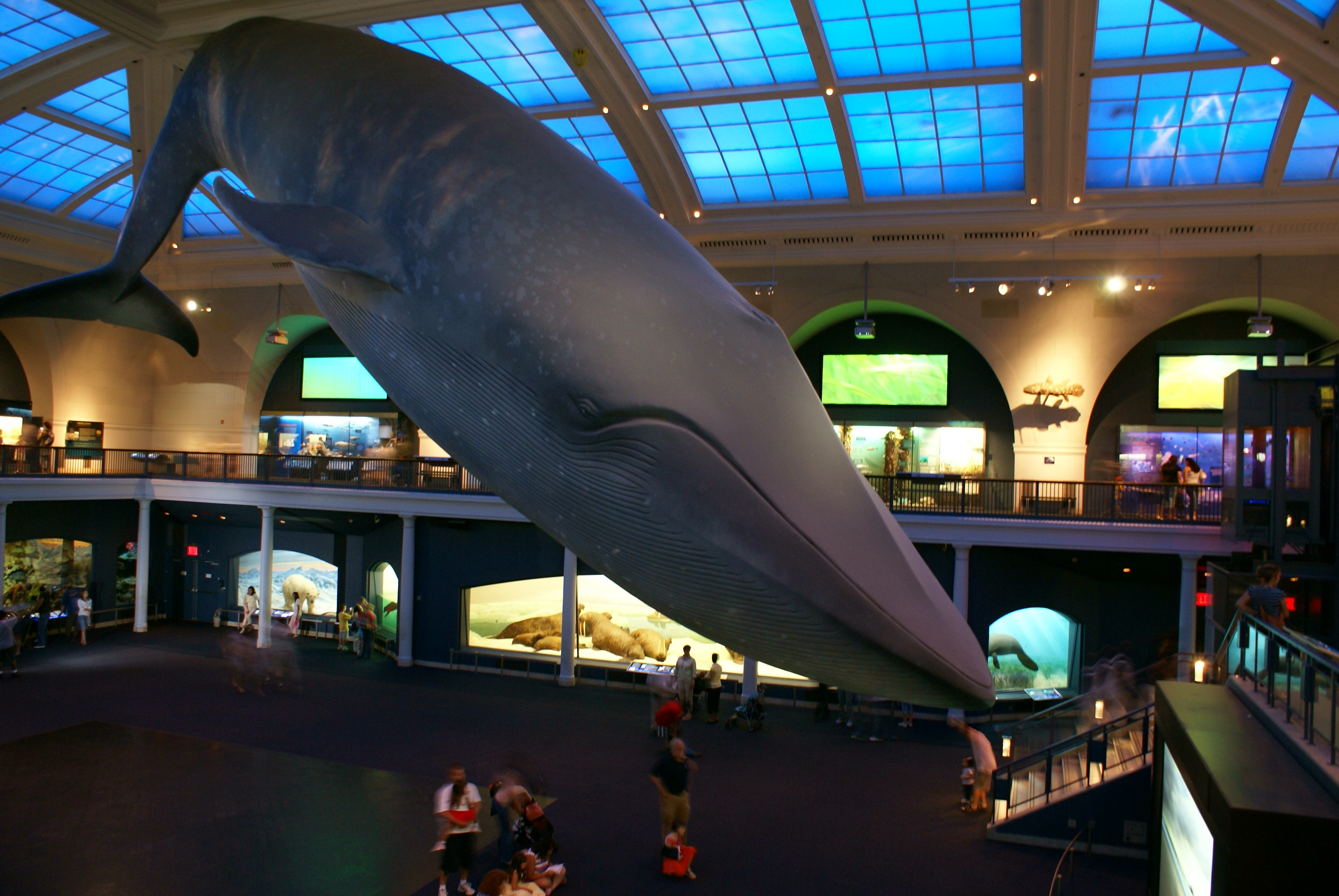
Model of a blue whale in the Milstein Family Hall of Ocean Life

The Milstein Hall of Ocean Life is in the southeastern quadrant of the first floor, west of the Hall of Biodiversity. It focuses on marine biology, botany and marine conservation. The center of the hall contains a 94 ft (29 m)-long blue whale model. The upper level of the hall exhibits the vast array of ecosystems present in the ocean. Dioramas compare and contrast the life in these different settings including kelp forests, mangroves, coral reefs, the bathypelagic, among others. It attempts to show how vast and varied the oceans are while encouraging common themes throughout. The lower half of the hall consists of 15 large dioramas of larger marine organisms. It is on this level that the famous "Squid and the Whale" diorama sits, depicting a hypothetical fight between the two creatures. Other notable exhibits in this hall include the two-level Andros Coral Reef Diorama.

In 1910, museum president Henry F. Osborn proposed the construction of a large building in the museum's southeast courtyard to house a new Hall of Ocean Life in which "models and skeletons of whales" would be exhibited. The hall opened in 1924 and was renovated in 1962. In 1969, a renovation gave the hall a more explicit focus on oceanic megafauna, including the addition of a lifelike blue whale model to replace a popular steel and papier-mâché whale model that had hung in the Biology of Mammals hall. Richard Van Gelder oversaw the creation of the hall in its current incarnation. The hall was renovated once again in 2003, this time with environmentalism and conservation being the main focal points, and was renamed after developer Paul Milstein and AMNH board member Irma Milstein. The 2003 renovation included refurbishment of the famous blue whale, suspended high above the 19,000 ft^{2} (1,800 m^{2}) exhibit floor; updates to the 1930s and 1960s dioramas; and electronic displays.

== Human origins and cultural halls ==
=== Cultural halls ===
==== Stout Hall of Asian Peoples ====
The Stout Hall of Asian Peoples is a one-story hall on the museum's second floor in between the Hall of Asian Mammals and Birds of the World. It is named for Gardner D. Stout, a former president of the museum, and was primarily organized by Walter A. Fairservis, a longtime museum archaeologist. Opened in 1980, Stout Hall is the museum's largest anthropological hall and contains artifacts acquired by the museum between 1869 and the mid-1970s. Many famous expeditions sponsored by the museum are associated with the artifacts in the hall, including the Roy Chapman Andrews expeditions in Central Asia and the Vernay-Hopwood Chindwin expedition.

Stout Hall has two sections: Ancient Eurasia, a small section devoted to the evolution of human civilization in Eurasia, and Traditional Asia, a much larger section containing cultural artifacts from across the Asian continent. The latter section is organized to geographically correspond with two major trade routes of the Silk Road. Like many of the museum's exhibition halls, the artifacts in Stout Hall are presented in a variety of ways including exhibits, miniature dioramas, and five full-scale dioramas. Notable exhibits in the Ancient Eurasian section include reproductions from the archaeological sites of Teshik-Tash and Çatalhöyük, as well as a full size replica of a Hammurabi Stele. The Traditional Asia section contains areas devoted to major Asian countries, such as Japan, China, Tibet, and India, while also including a vast array of smaller Asian tribes including the Ainu, Semai, and Yakut.

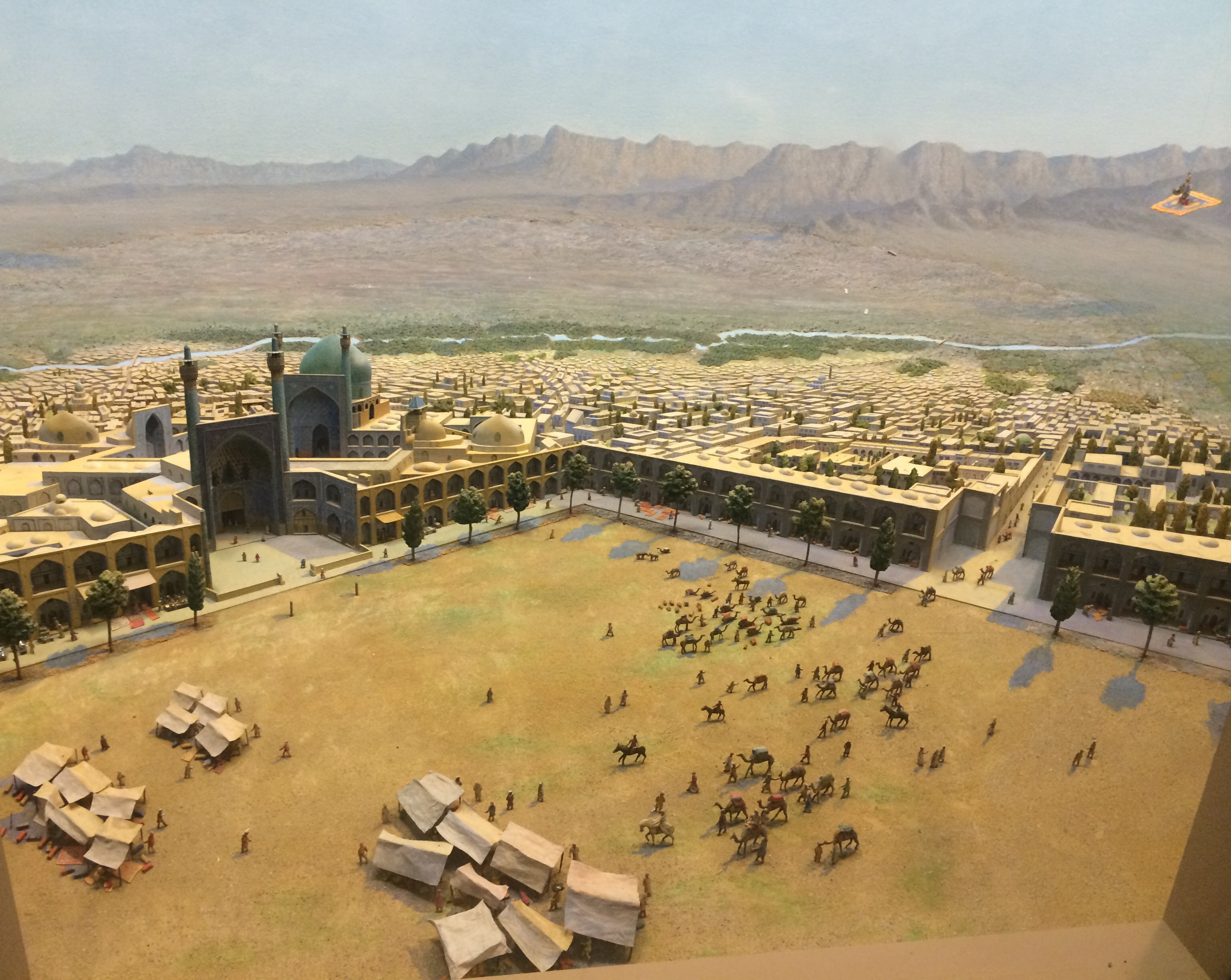
A forced perspective, miniature diorama of Isfahan

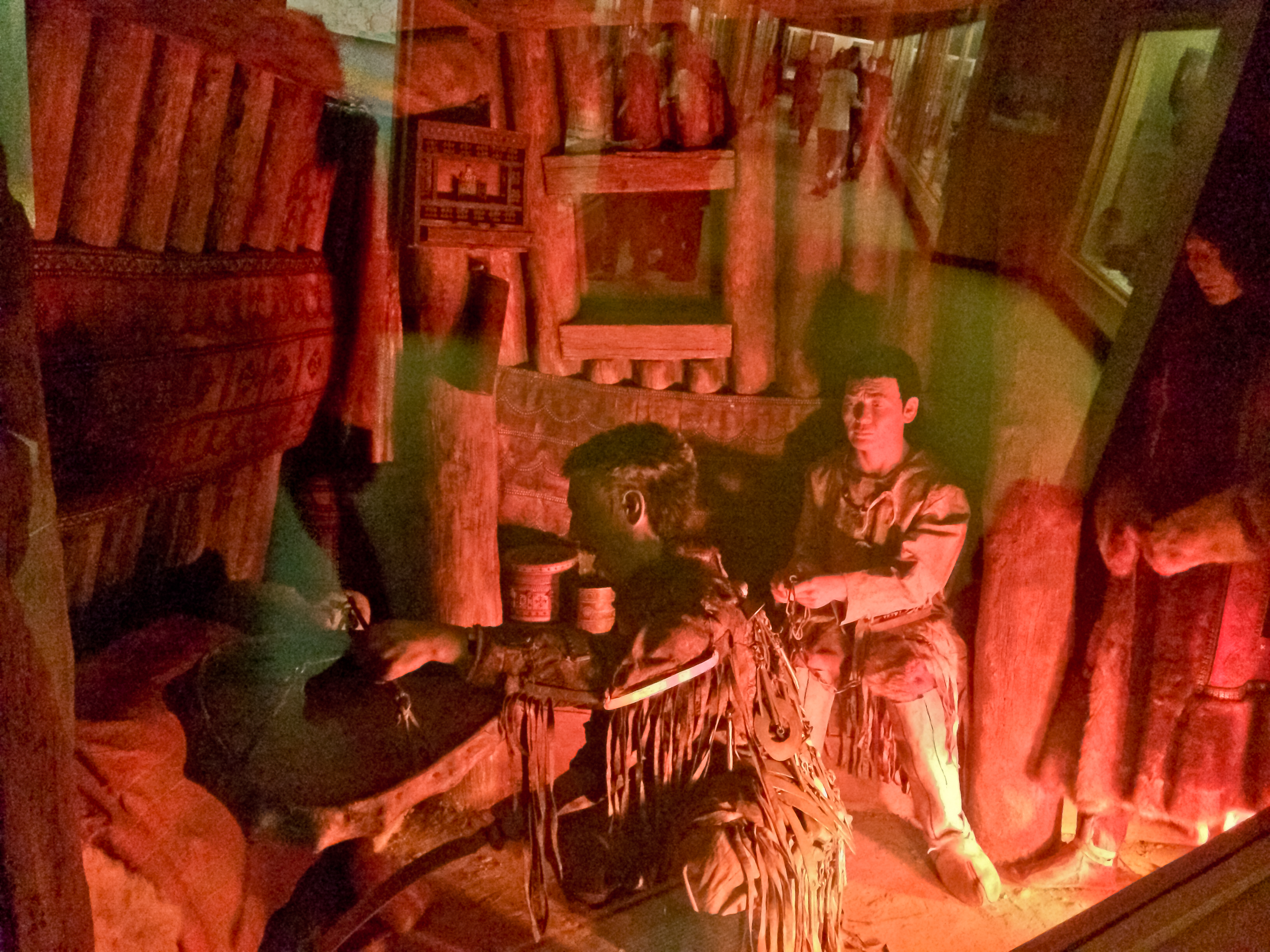
A Yakut shaman performs a healing rite in this diorama

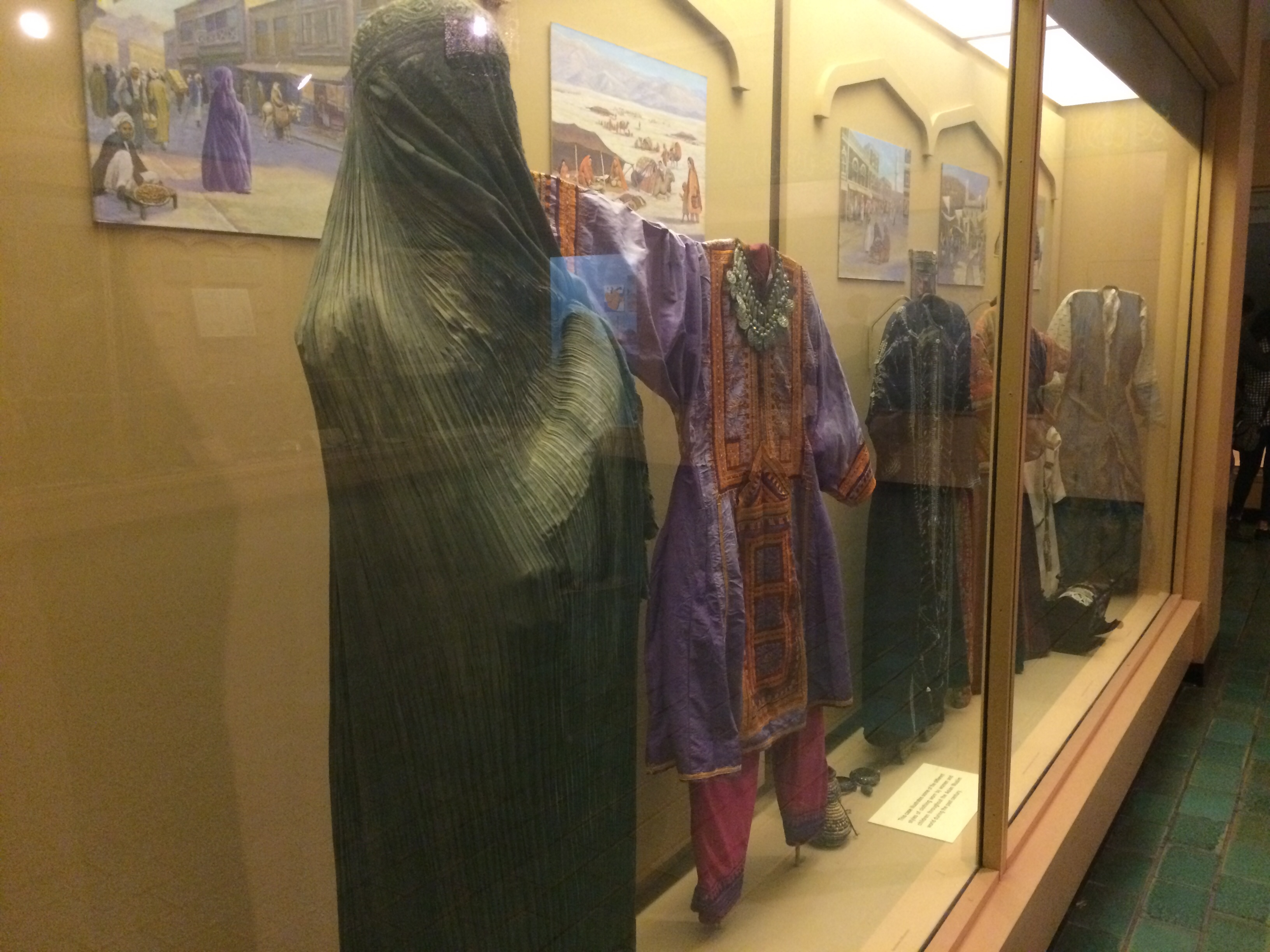
A range of costumes worn by women in Islamic Asia

==== Hall of African Peoples ====
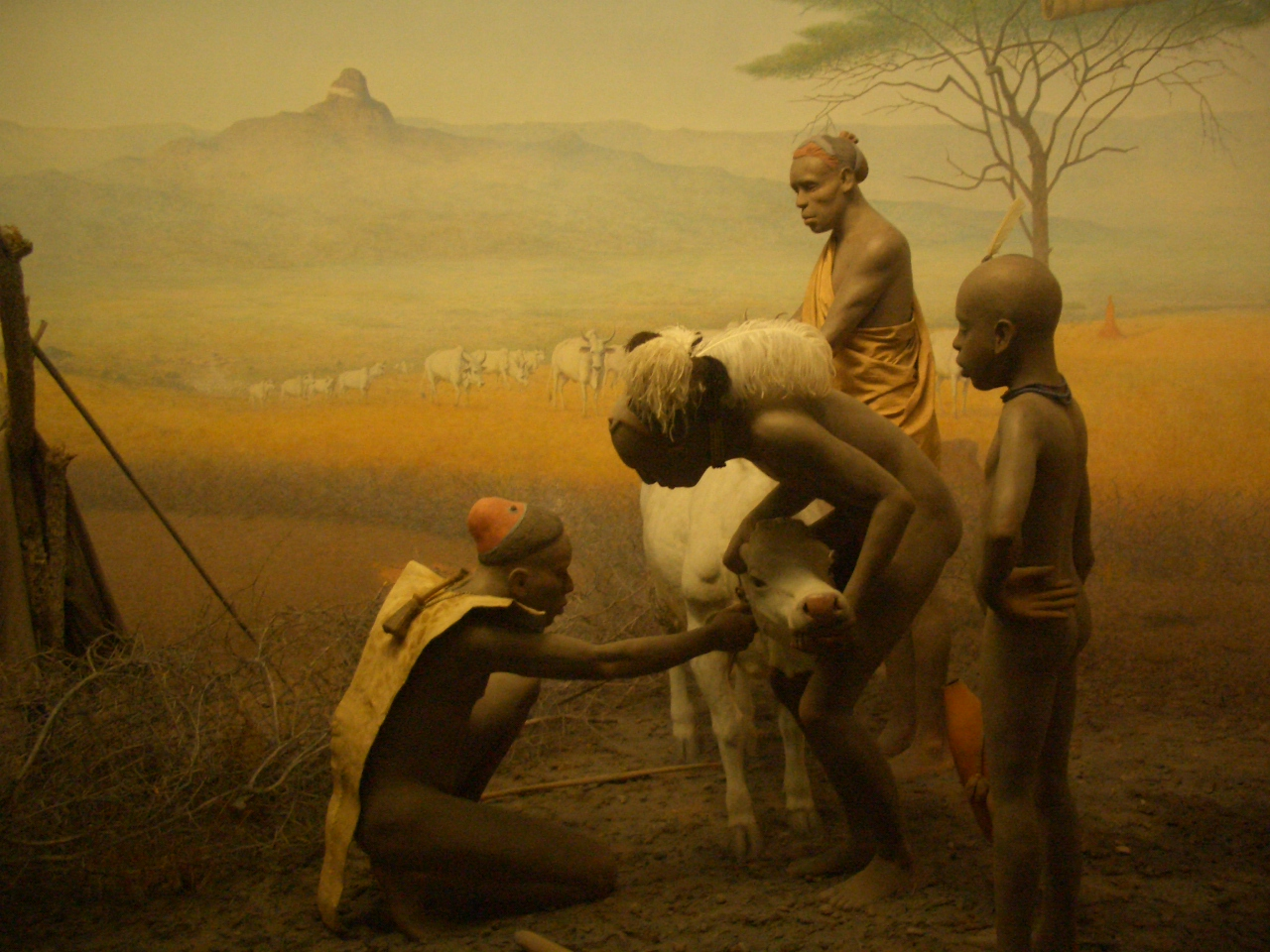
Diorama depicting Pokot methods of animal husbandry

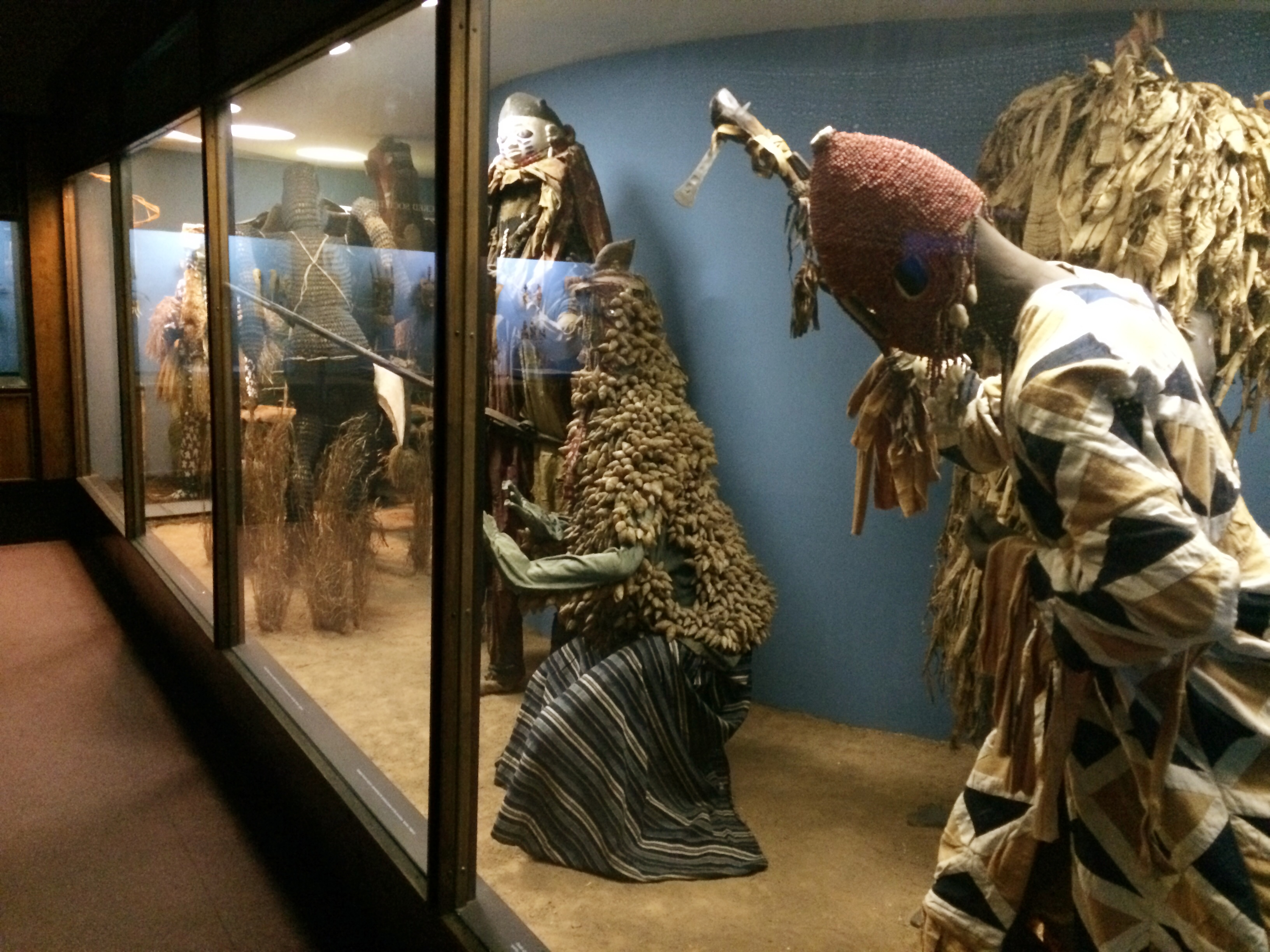
Spiritual costumes from a variety of African tribes

The Hall of African Peoples is behind Akeley Hall of African Mammals and underneath Sanford Hall of North American Birds. It is organized by the four major ecosystems found in Africa: River Valley, Grasslands, Forest-Woodland, and Desert. Each section presents artifacts and exhibits of the peoples native to the ecosystems throughout Africa. The hall contains three dioramas and notable exhibits include a large collection of spiritual costumes on display in the Forest-Woodland section. Uniting the sections of the hall is a multi-faceted comparison of African societies based on hunting and gathering, cultivation, and animal domestication. Each type of society is presented in a historical, political, spiritual, and ecological context. A small section of African diaspora spread by the slave trade is also included. Tribes and civilizations featured include:

- River Valley: Ancient Egyptians, Nubians, Kuba, Lozi
- Grasslands: Pokot, Shilluk, Barawa
- Forest-Woodland: Yoruba, Kofyar, Mbuti
- Desert: Ait Atta, Tuareg

==== Hall of Mexico and Central America ====
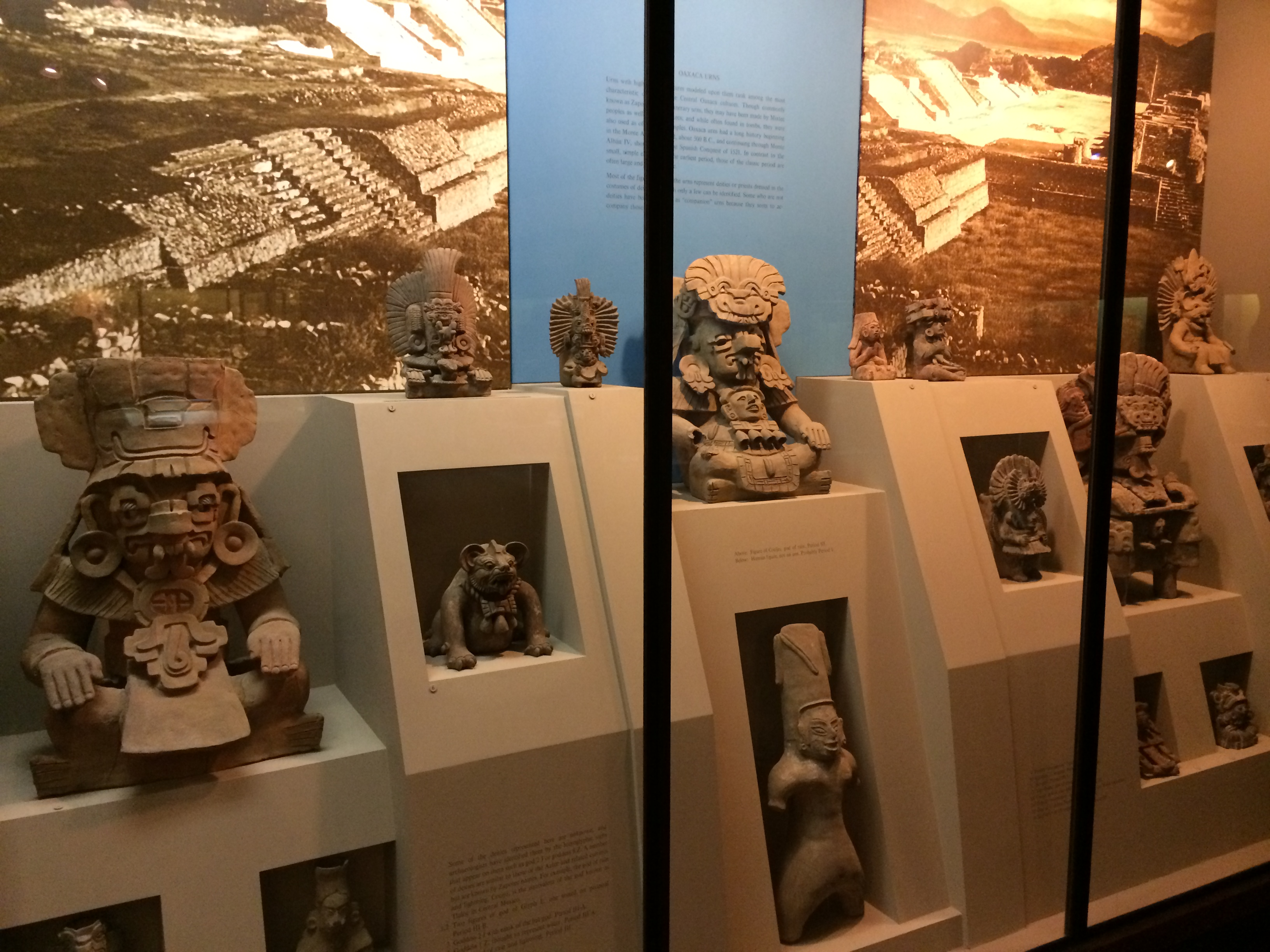
Zapotec burial urns from Monte Albán

The Hall of Mexico and Central America is a one-story hall on the museum's second floor behind Birds of the World and before the Hall of South American Peoples. It presents archaeological artifacts from a broad range of pre-Columbian civilizations that once existed across Mesoamerica, including the Maya, Olmec, Zapotec, and Aztec. Because the great majority of the written records of these civilizations did not survive the Spanish conquest, the overarching aim of the hall is to piece together what it is possible to know about them from the artifacts alone.

The museum has displayed pre-Columbian artifacts since its opening, only a short time after the discovery of the civilizations by archaeologists, with its first hall dedicated to the subject opening in 1899. As the museum's collection grew, the hall underwent major renovations in 1944 and again in 1970 when it re-opened in its current form. Notable artifacts on display include the Kunz Axe and a full-scale replica of Tomb 104 from the Monte Albán archaeological site, originally displayed at the 1939 World's Fair.

==== South American Peoples ====
The Hall of South American Peoples is a one-story hall on the northwestern corner of the second floor, next to the Hall of Mexico and Central America. The hall was first opened on the third floor in 1904, and exhibited archaeological objects, including mummies, from Peru, Colombia, Bolivia, and the West Indies. In 1931, the hall was expanded and relocated to the second floor under the direction of curators Ronald Olson and W.C. Bennett. The new hall included a recreation of a Chilean copper mine, and later, a temporary hall titled the Men of the Montaña, which featured Peruvian cultural artifacts from the Cashibo, and Panoan peoples. In 1989, the Hall was renovated and reopened as a permanent exhibition, focusing on the technology and artistry of the ancient Andean and traditional Amazonian cultures, led by curators Craig Morris, Junius Bird, and Robert Carneiro. The Hall contains roughly 2,300 objects from various ancient South American cultures, including the Moche, Chávin, Chancay, Paracas, Nazca, and Inca. A number of the artifacts on display come from the Roosevelt Collections, which were collected by Theodore Roosevelt on expeditions to South America in the early 20th century and donated to the museum.

==== Margaret Mead Hall of Pacific Peoples ====
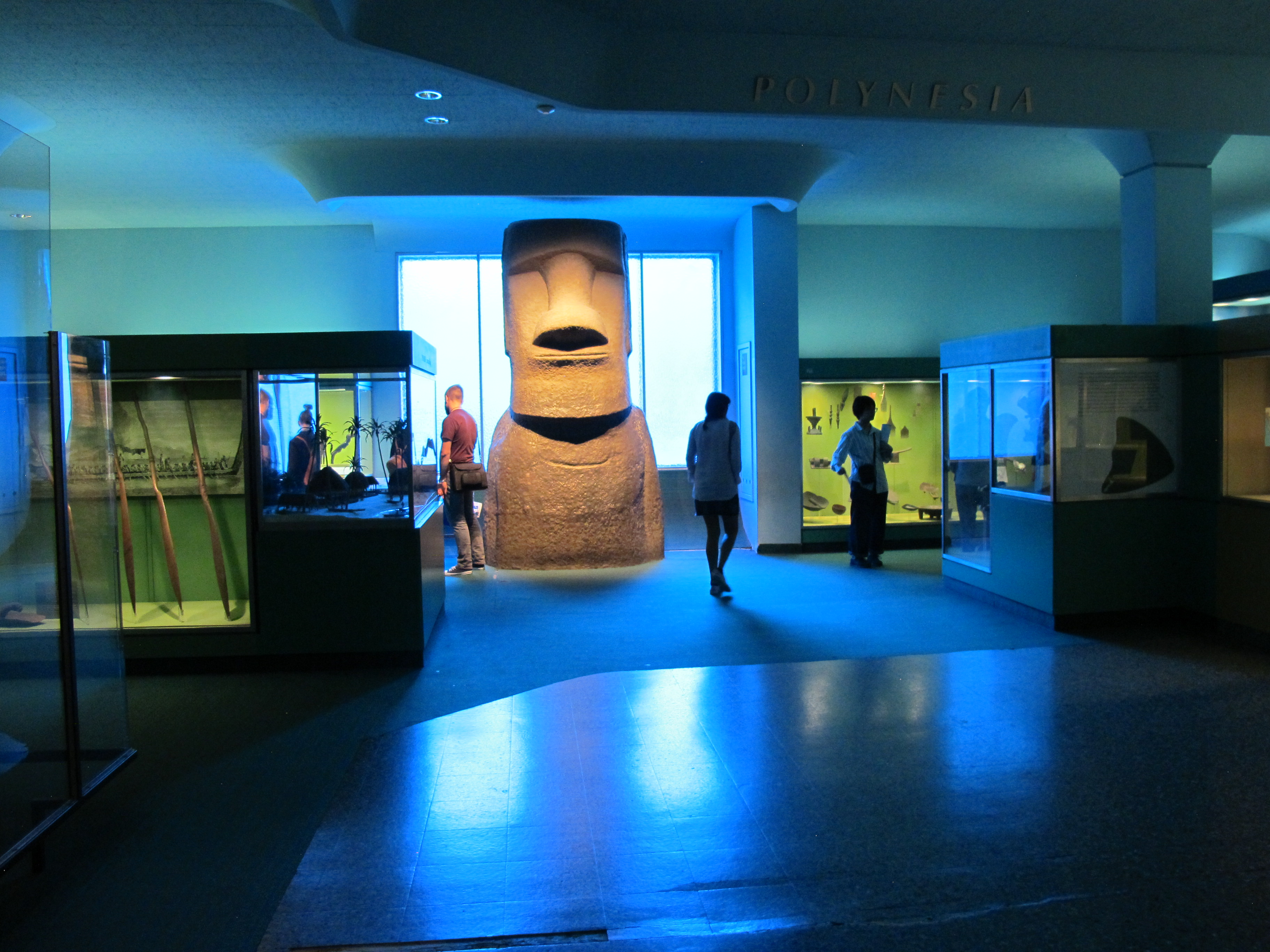
A fiberglass cast of a moai in the Margaret Mead Hall of Pacific Peoples

The Hall of Pacific Peoples is on the southwestern corner of the third floor, accessed through the Hall of Plains Indians. The cultural anthropologist Margaret Mead had founded the Hall of Pacific Peoples in 1971. From the time Mead began curatorial work on the hall in 1945, she conceived an exhibit environment that would emulate sights and sounds from the Pacific regions on display. After Mead's death in 1978, the hall reopened in December 1984 as the Margaret Mead Hall of Pacific Peoples. The new hall, designed by Eugene Burgmann, maintained the blue-themed ocean and sky ambiance of the original hall. The hall was once again closed in 1997 and reopened in 2001 with an updated design that retained the geocultural "alcoves" first installed with the 1984 remodel.

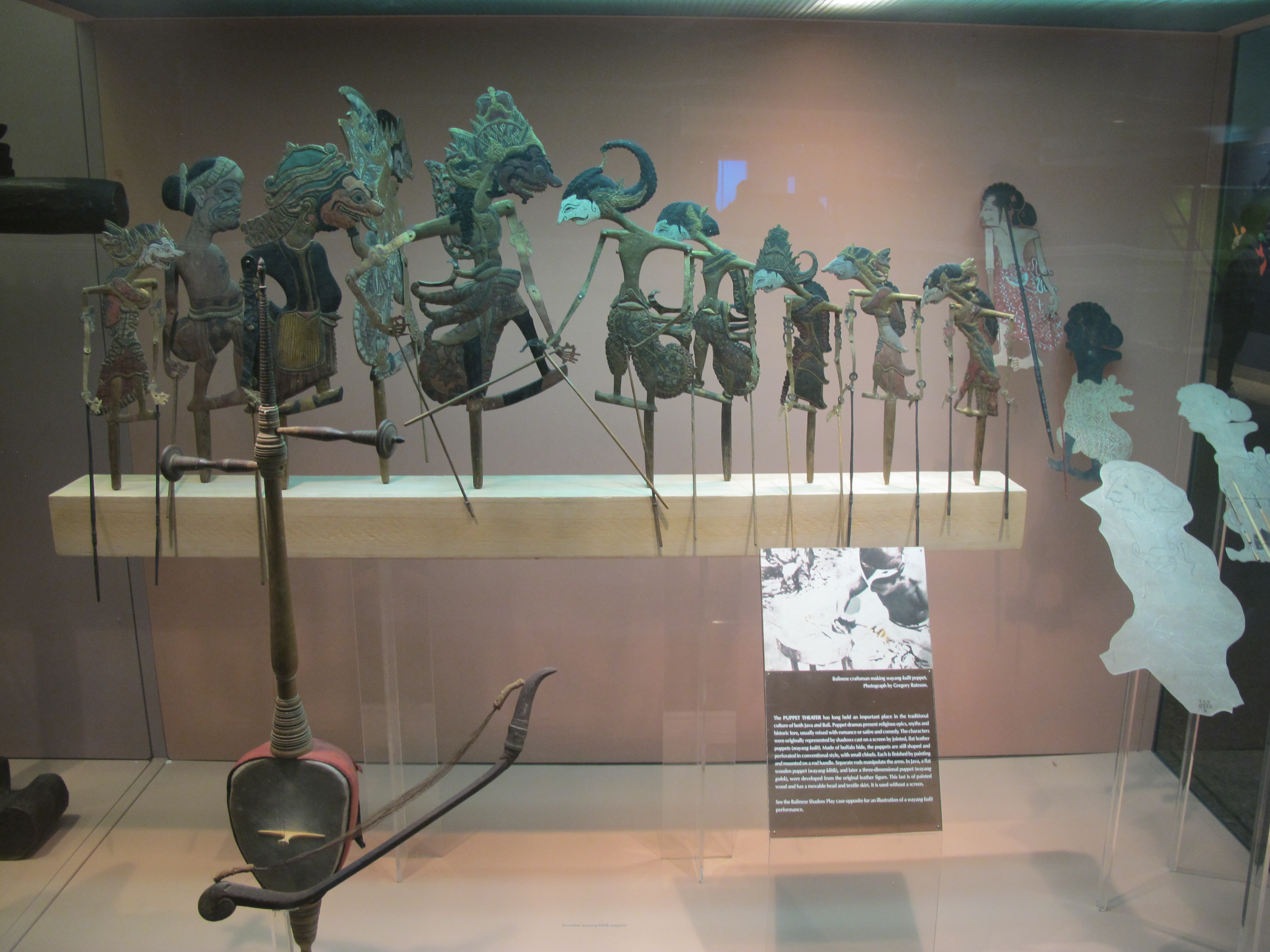
Balinese wayang puppets collected by Mead and Bateson on display with photograph of puppet maker by Bateson.

The Margaret Mead Hall of Pacific Peoples contains artifacts from New Zealand, Australia, Indonesia, the Philippines, Micronesia, Melanesia and other Pacific islands. Mead had collected 250 of the 1,500 items in the hall. Some of these were probably selected from the 3,284 items she collected for the American Museum of Natural History during fieldwork in New Guinea and other Pacific island locations, 1928–1939. Others, such as the theatrical set from a puppet play in Bali, were chosen from among the approximately 600 items that Mead and her anthropologist husband Gregory Bateson had sent to the American Museum of Natural History while they were conducting fieldwork in Bali, 1936–1938. The exhibits in the Margaret Mead Hall of Pacific Peoples also include a fiberglass cast of an Easter Island moai statue and capes made of honeycreeper feathers.

==== Native American halls ====
===== Northwest Coast Hall =====
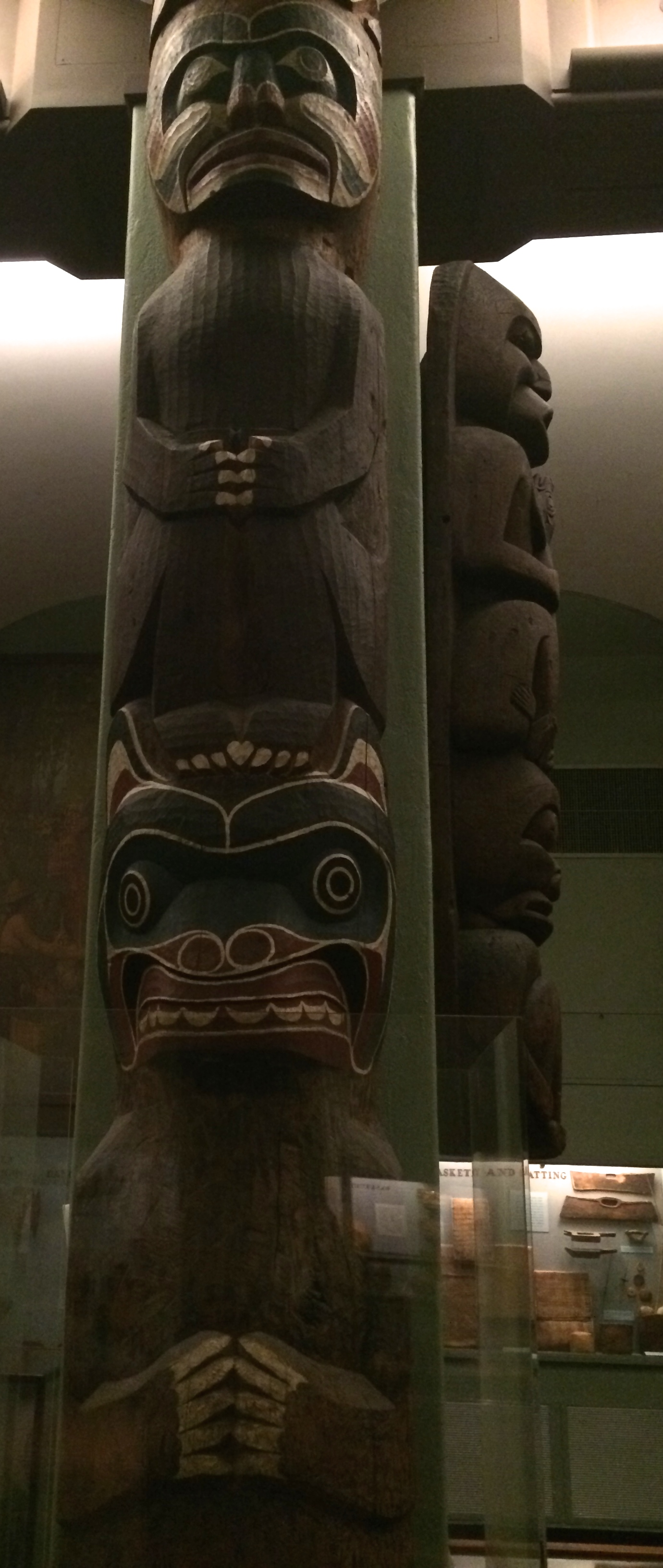
Kwakwaka'wakw House Posts

The Northwest Coast Hall is a one-story hall on the museum's ground floor behind the Grand Gallery and in between Warburg and Spitzer Halls. it is the museum's oldest hall, having been established in 1899 by anthropologist Franz Boas as the Jesup North Pacific Hall. The hall now contains artifacts and exhibits of the tribes of the North Pacific Coast cultural region (Southern Alaska, Northern Washington, and a portion of British Columbia). Featured prominently in the hall are four "House Posts" from the Kwakwaka'wakw nation and murals by William S. Taylor depicting native life. As of 2022, there are 9,000 items in total, including 78 totem poles, as well as a Haida canoe suspended from the ceiling (relocated from the Grand Gallery in 2020). The artifacts are accompanied by text in numerous Native American languages.

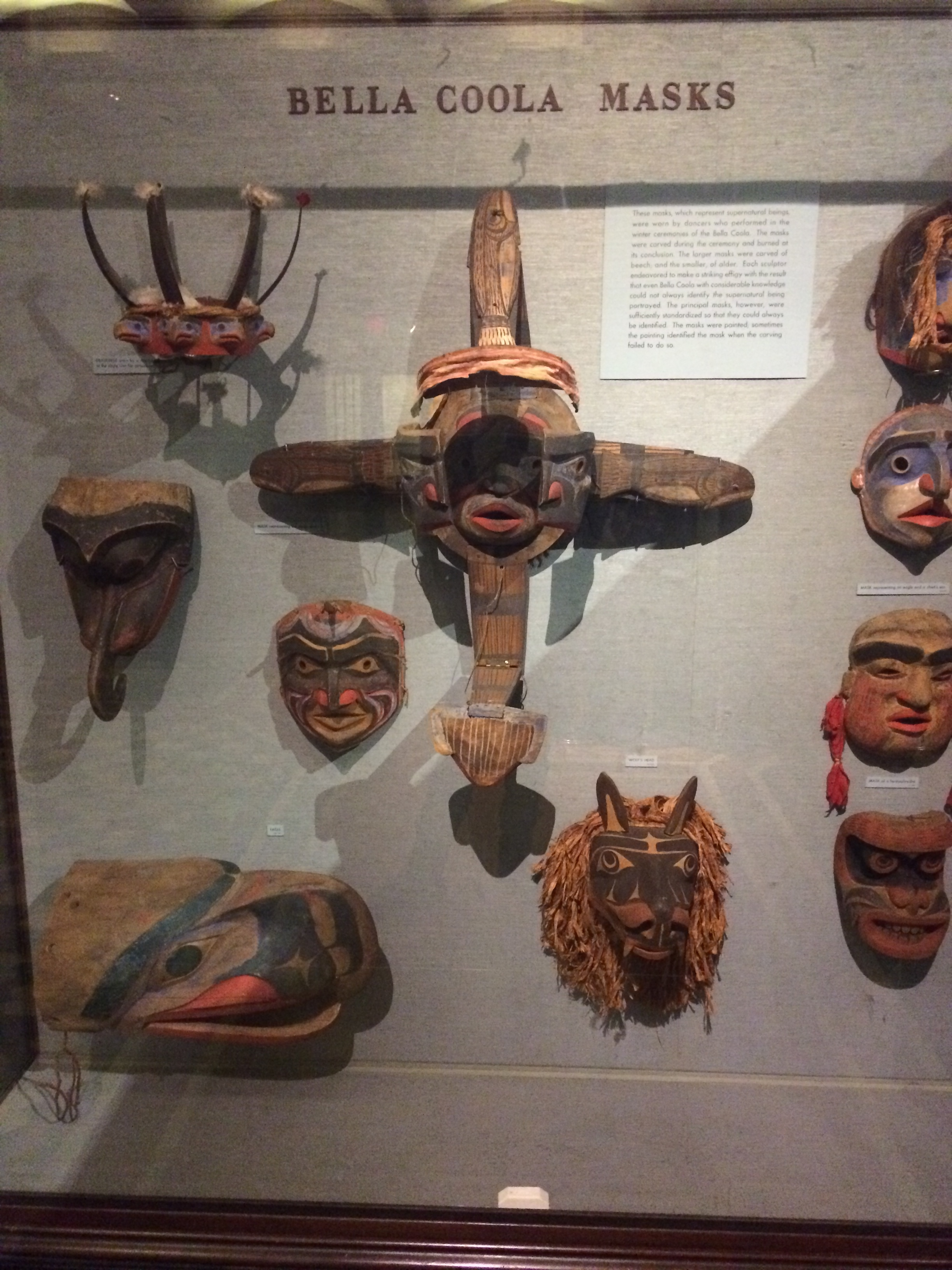
Nuxalk Masks

Artifacts in the hall originated from three main sources. The earliest of these was a gift of Haida artifacts collected by John Wesley Powell and donated by future trustee Heber R. Bishop in 1882. This was followed by the museum's purchase of two collections of Tlingit artifacts collected by Lt. George T. Emmons in 1888 and 1894. The remainder of the hall's artifacts were collected during the famed Jesup North Pacific Expedition between 1897 and 1902. Led by Boas and financed by museum president Morris Ketchum Jesup, the expedition was the first for the museum's Division of Anthropology and is now considered the "foremost expedition in American anthropology". Many famous ethnologists took part, including George Hunt, who secured the Kwakwaka'wakw House Posts in the hall. Other tribes featured in the hall include Coastal Salish, Nuu-chah-nulth, Tsimshian, and Nuxalk.

At the time of its opening, the Northwest Coast Hall was one of four halls dedicated to the native peoples of United States and Canada. It was originally organized in two sections, the first being a general area pertaining to all peoples of the region and the second a specialized area divided by tribe. This was a point of contention for Boas who wanted all artifacts in the hall to be associated with the proper tribe (much like it is currently organized), eventually leading to the dissolution of Boas's relationship with the museum. In May 2022, the hall reopened after a five-year, $19 million renovation, with more than 1,000 artifacts on view. The new display includes work from contemporary artists such as Greg Colfax KlaWayHee and Robert Davidson.

===== Hall of Plains Indians =====
The Hall of Plains Indians is on the south side of the third floor, near the western end of the museum. This hall opened in February 1967. The primary focus of this hall is the North American Great Plains peoples as they were at the middle of the 19th century, including depictions of Blackfeet (see also: Blackfoot Confederacy), Hidatsa, and Dakota cultures. Of particular interest is a Folsom point discovered in 1926 New Mexico, providing evidence of early American colonization of the Americas.

===== Hall of Eastern Woodlands Indians =====
The Hall of Eastern Woodlands Indians is next to the Hall of Plains Indians, on the south side of the third floor. This hall opened in May 1966. It details the lives and technology of traditional Native American peoples in the woodland environments of eastern North America. These include Cree, Mohegan, Ojibwe, and Iroquois cultures. The exhibit features examples of indigenous basketry, pottery, farming techniques, food preparation, metal jewelry, musical instruments, and textiles. Other highlights include a model of a Menominee birchbark canoe and various traditional lodgings such as an Ojibwa domed wigwam, an Iroquois longhouse, a Creek council house, and other eastern woodland dwelling styles. As of January 2024, the Hall of Eastern Woodlands Indians, along with the Hall of the Plains Indians, is closed to ensure compliance with new NAGPRA regulations.

=== Human origins halls ===
==== Anne and Bernard Spitzer Hall of Human Origins ====
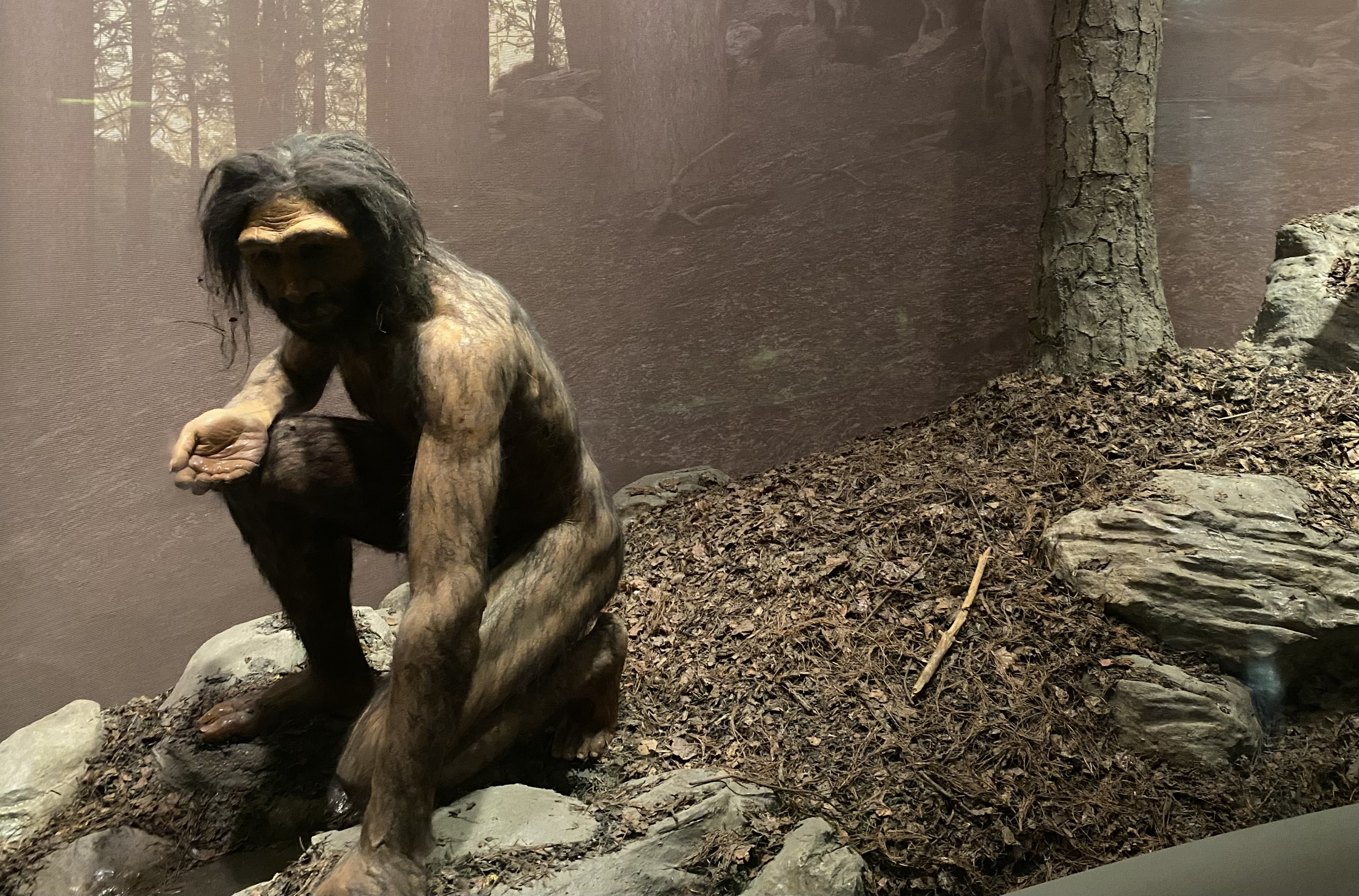
Homo erectus diorama in the Hall of Human Origins

The Anne and Bernard Spitzer Hall of Human Origins, formerly The Hall of Human Biology and Evolution, is on the south side of the first floor, near the western end of the museum. It opened under its current name on February 10, 2007. When it first opened in 1921, the hall was known as the "Hall of the Age of Man", the only major exhibition in the United States to present an in-depth investigation of human evolution. The displays traced the story of Homo sapiens, illuminated the path of human evolution and examined the origins of human creativity.

Many of the displays from the original hall can still be viewed in the present expanded format. These include life-size dioramas of human predecessors Australopithecus afarensis, Homo ergaster, Neanderthal, and Cro-Magnon, showing each species demonstrating the behaviors and capabilities that scientists believe they were capable of. Also displayed are full-sized casts of important fossils, including the 3.2-million-year-old Lucy skeleton and the 1.7-million-year-old Turkana Boy, and Homo erectus specimens including a cast of Peking Man. The hall also features replicas of ice age art found in the Dordogne region of southwestern France. The limestone carvings of horses were made nearly 26,000 years ago and are considered to represent some of the earliest artistic expression of humans.

== Earth and planetary science halls ==
=== Arthur Ross Hall of Meteorites ===
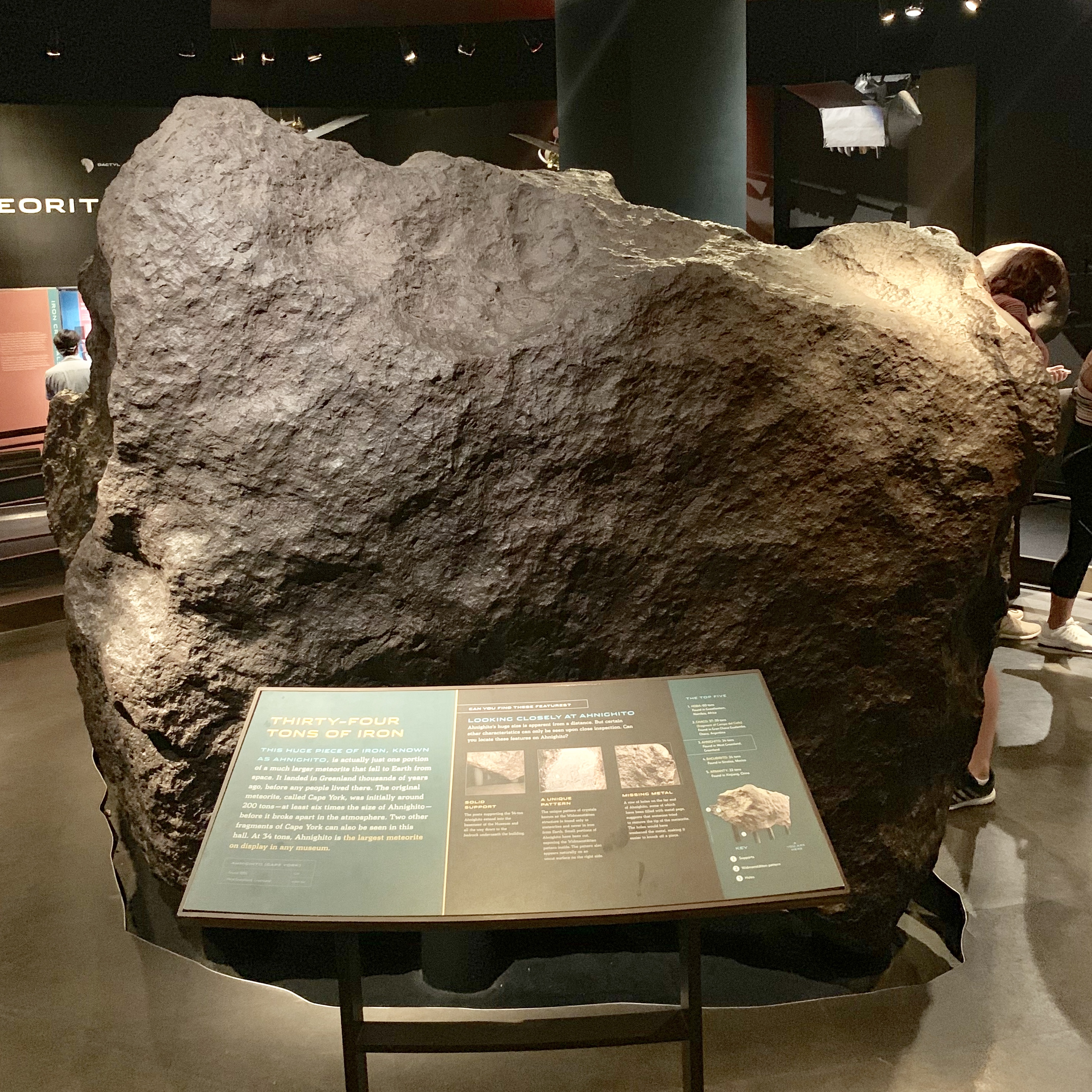
Cape York Meteorite

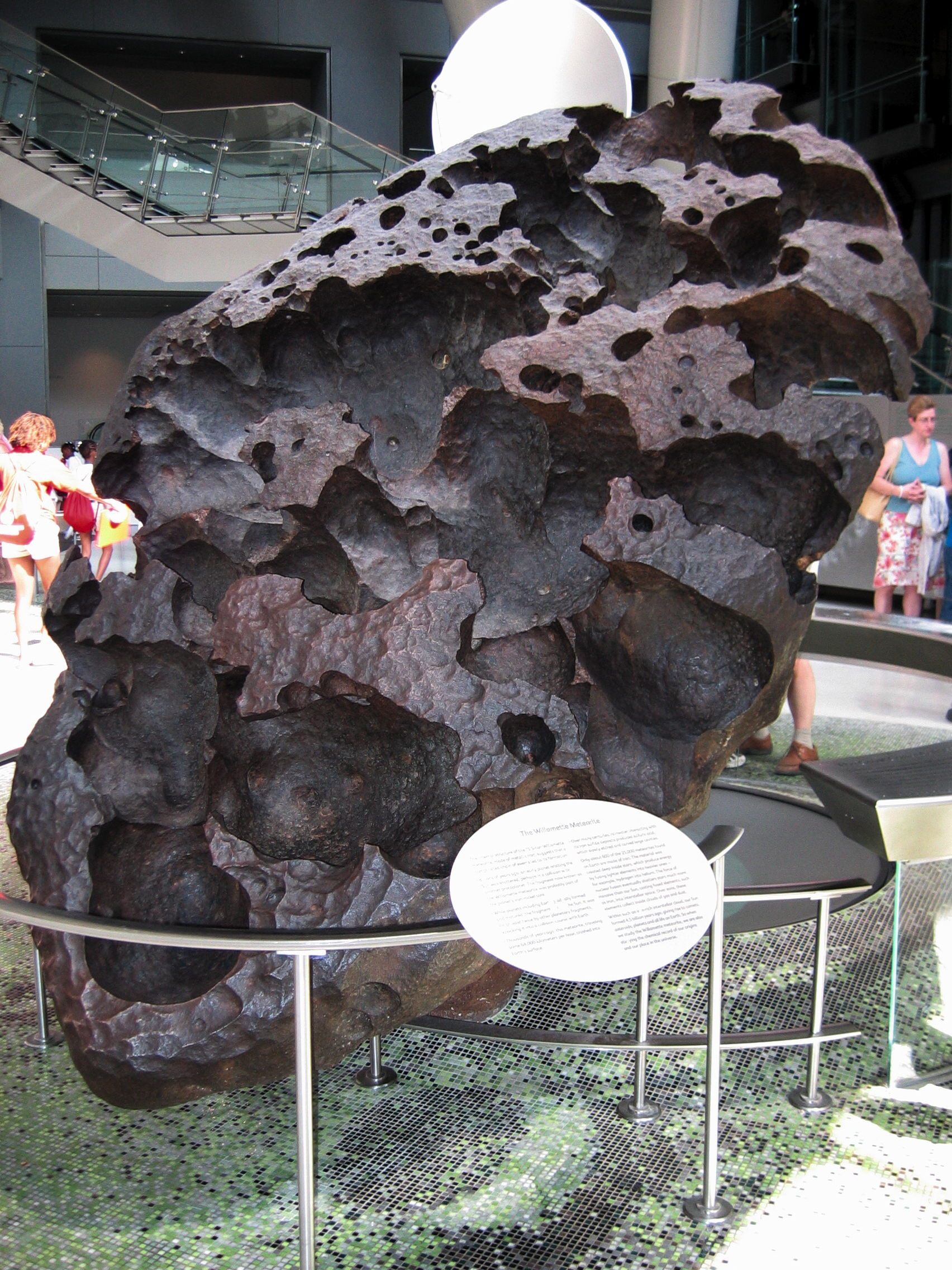
Willamette Meteorite

The Arthur Ross Hall of Meteorites is on the southwest corner of the first floor. It contains some of the finest specimens in the world including Ahnighito, a section of the 200-ton Cape York meteorite which was first made known to non-Inuit cultures on their investigation of Meteorite Island, Greenland. Its great weight, 34 tons, makes it the largest displayed in the Northern Hemisphere. It has support by columns that extend through the floor and into the bedrock below the museum.

The hall also contains extra-solar nanodiamonds (diamonds with dimensions on the nanometer level) more than 5 billion years old. These were extracted from a meteorite sample through chemical means, and they are so small that a quadrillion of these fit into a volume smaller than a cubic centimeter.

=== Allison and Roberto Mignone Halls of Gems and Minerals ===
The Allison and Roberto Mignone Halls of Gems and Minerals (formerly the Harry Frank Guggenheim Hall of Gems and Minerals) is on the first floor, north of the Ross Hall of Meteorites. It houses thousands of rare gems, minerals specimens and pieces of jewelry. The halls closed in 2017 to undergo a $32 million redesign by Ralph Appelbaum Associates and reopened to the general public in June 2021. The redesigned exhibits adopt newer philosophies in exhibit design, including a focus on storytelling, interactivity, and connecting ideas across disciplines. The halls explore a range of topics, including the diversification of mineral species over the course of Earth's history, plate tectonics, and the stories of specific gems.

The halls display rare samples chosen from among the more than 100,000 pieces in the museum's collection including the Star of India, the Patricia Emerald, and the DeLong Star Ruby.

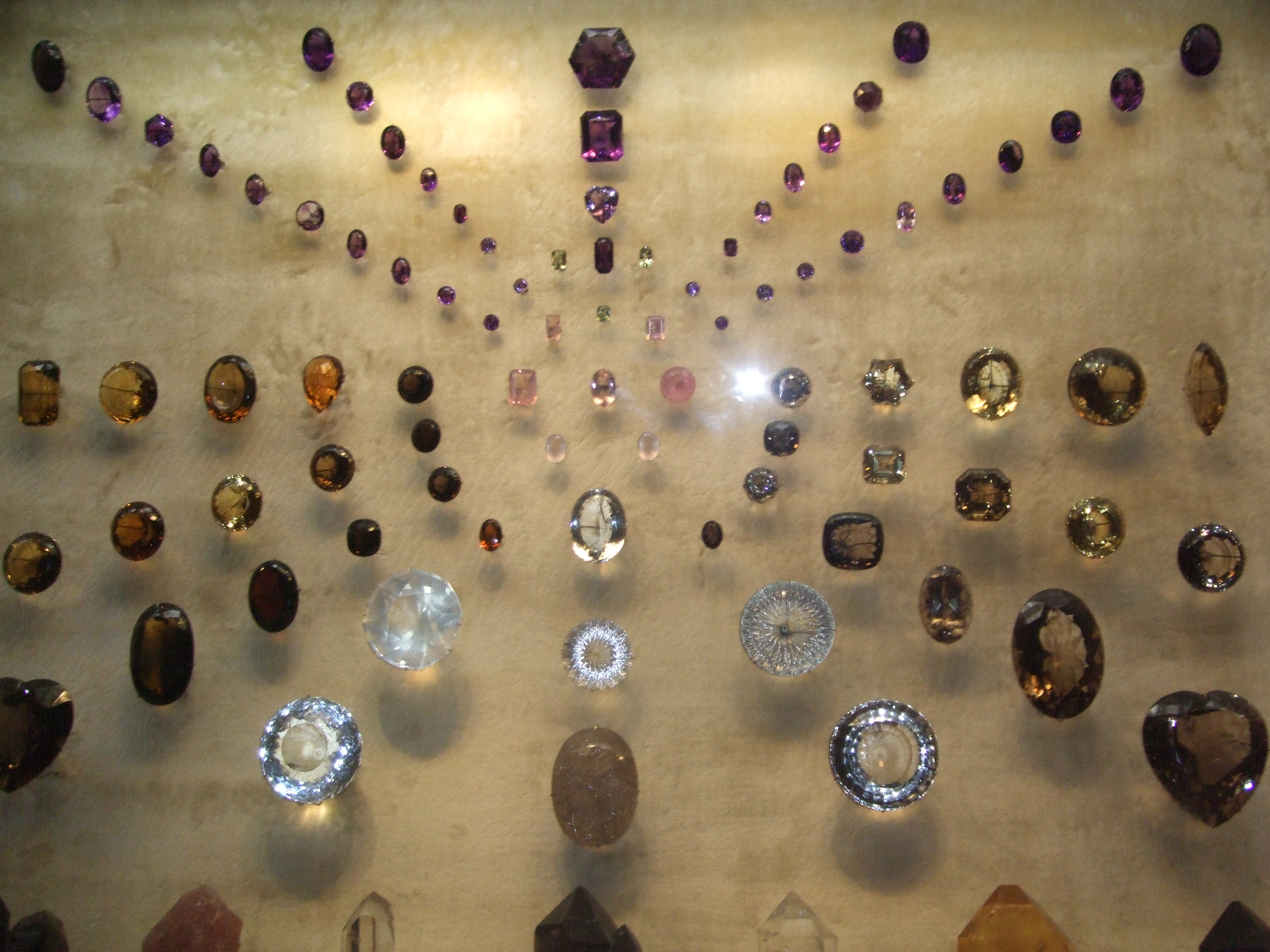
Assorted faceted and polished minerals

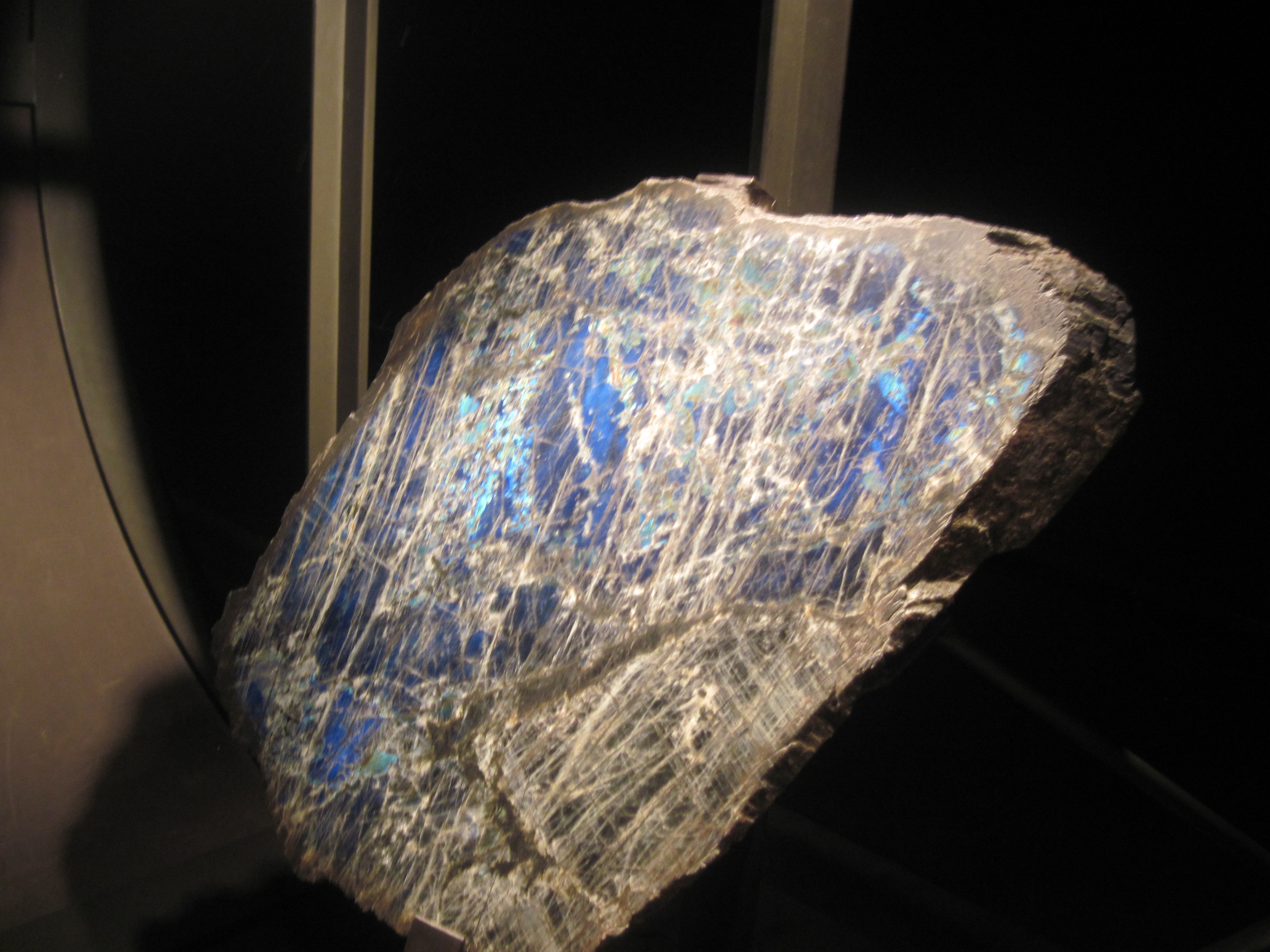
Labradorite specimen

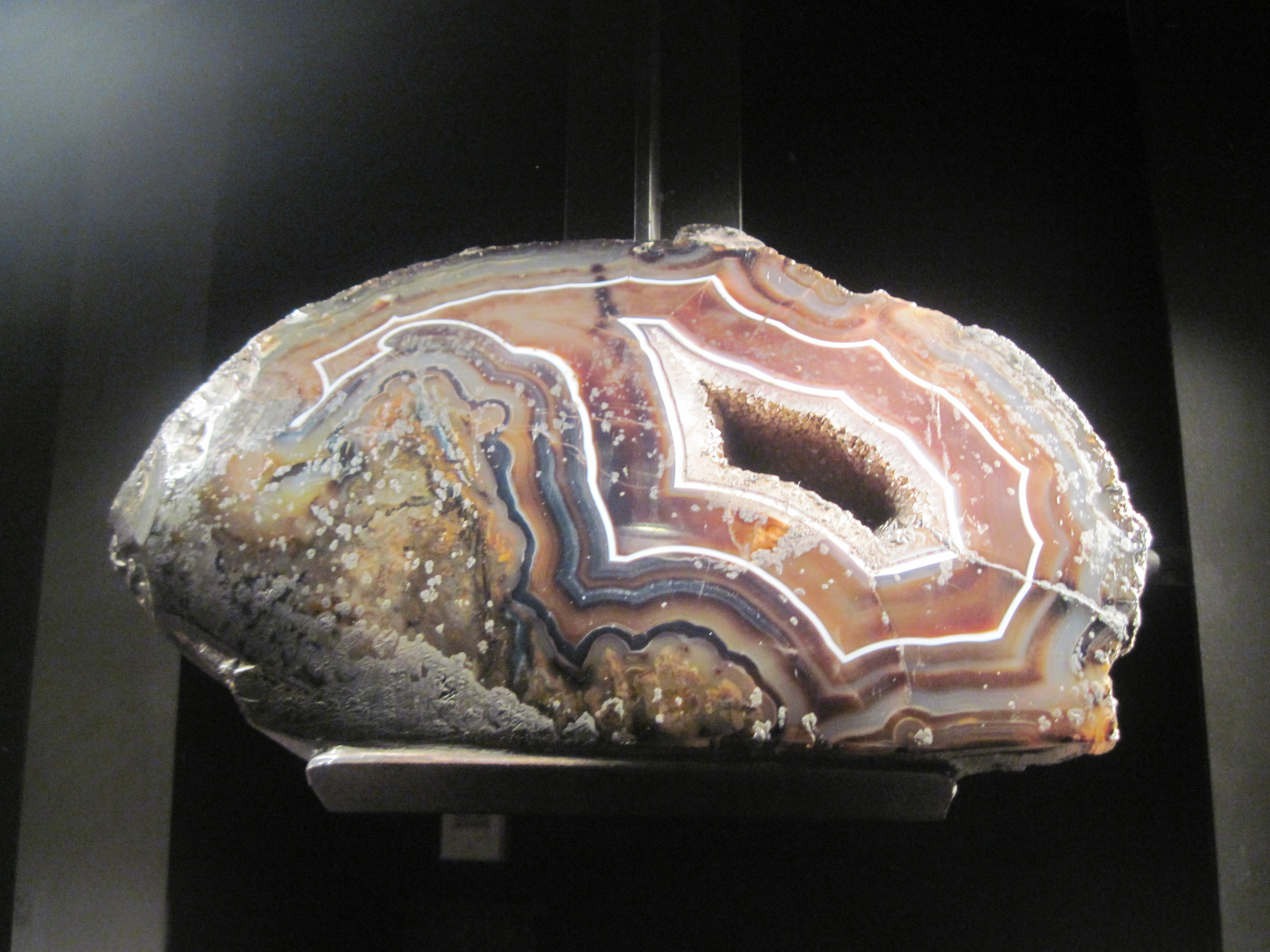
Quartz var. agate geode

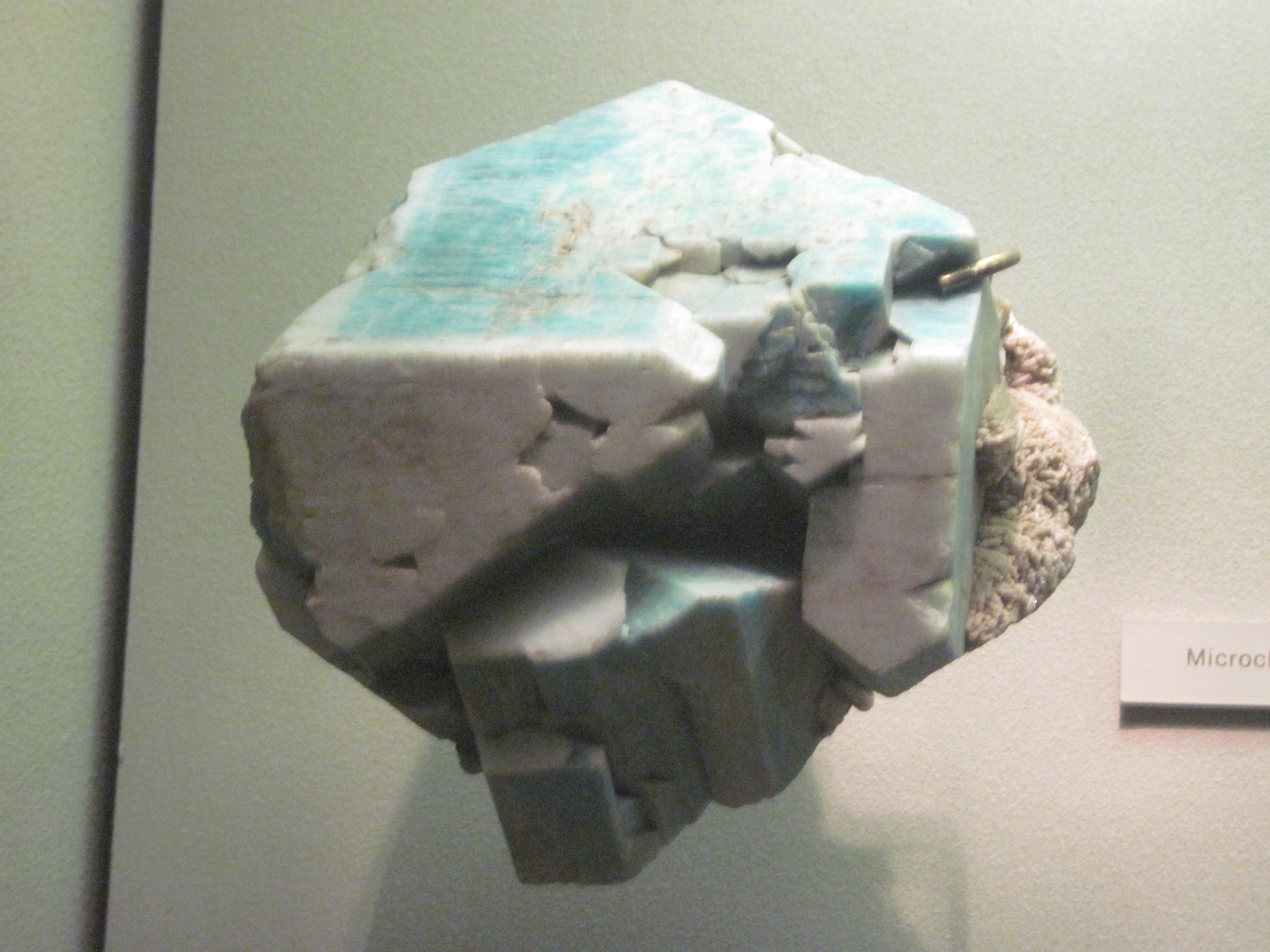
Microcline specimen

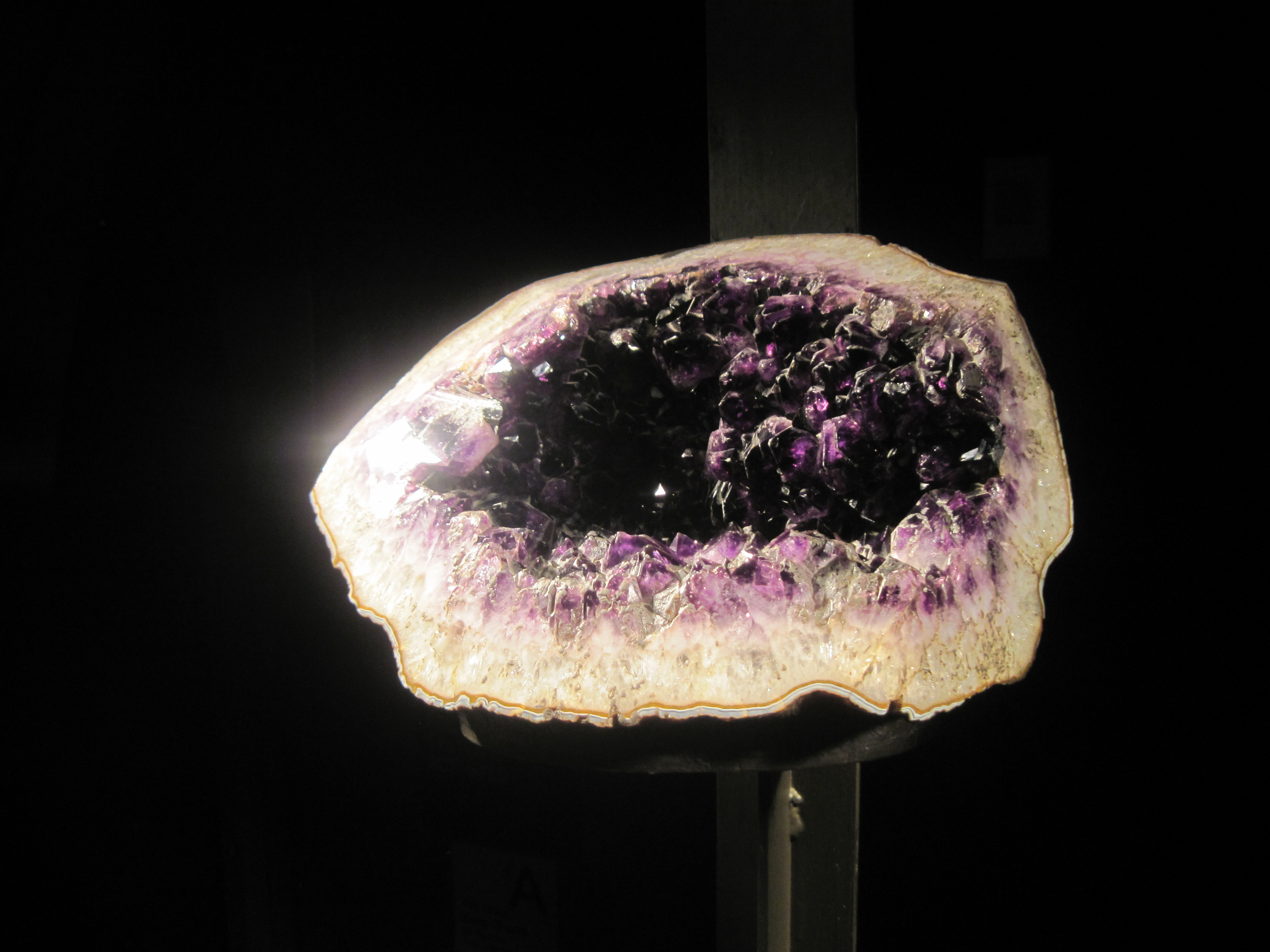
Quartz var. amethyst geode

=== David S. and Ruth L. Gottesman Hall of Planet Earth ===
The David S. and Ruth L. Gottesman Hall of Planet Earth is on the first floor at the northeast corner of the museum. Opened in 1999, it is a permanent hall devoted to the history of Earth, from accretion to the origin of life and contemporary human impacts on the planet. The hall was designed to answer five key questions: "How has earth evolved? Why are there ocean basins, continents and mountains? How do scientists read rocks? What causes climate and climate change? Why is earth habitable?" The hall features rocks and other objects collected over 28 expeditions; the oldest rock is 4.3 billion years old, while the youngest was collected from a volcano on the day that it solidified. There is also a 30-seat granite amphitheater, with a globe, at the center of the hall.

Several sections also discuss the studies of Earth systems, including geology, glaciology, atmospheric sciences, and volcanology. The exhibit has several large, touchable rock specimens. The hall features striking samples of banded iron and deformed conglomerate rocks, as well as granites, sandstones, lavas, and three black smokers. The north section of the hall, which deals primarily with plate tectonics, is arranged to mimic the Earth's structure, with the core and mantle at the center and crustal features on the perimeter.

== Fossil halls ==
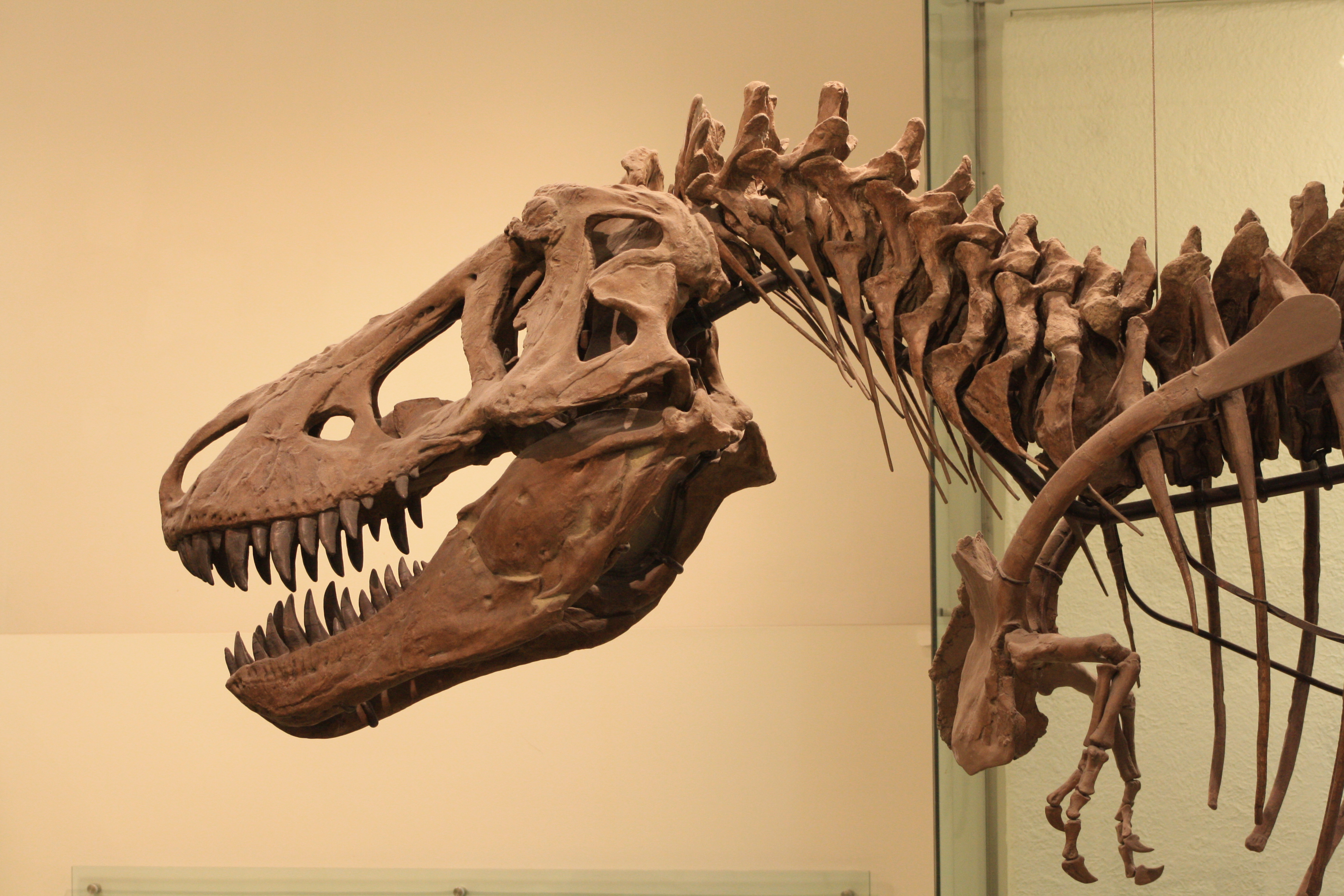
Tyrannosaurus rex in the Hall of Saurischian Dinosaurs

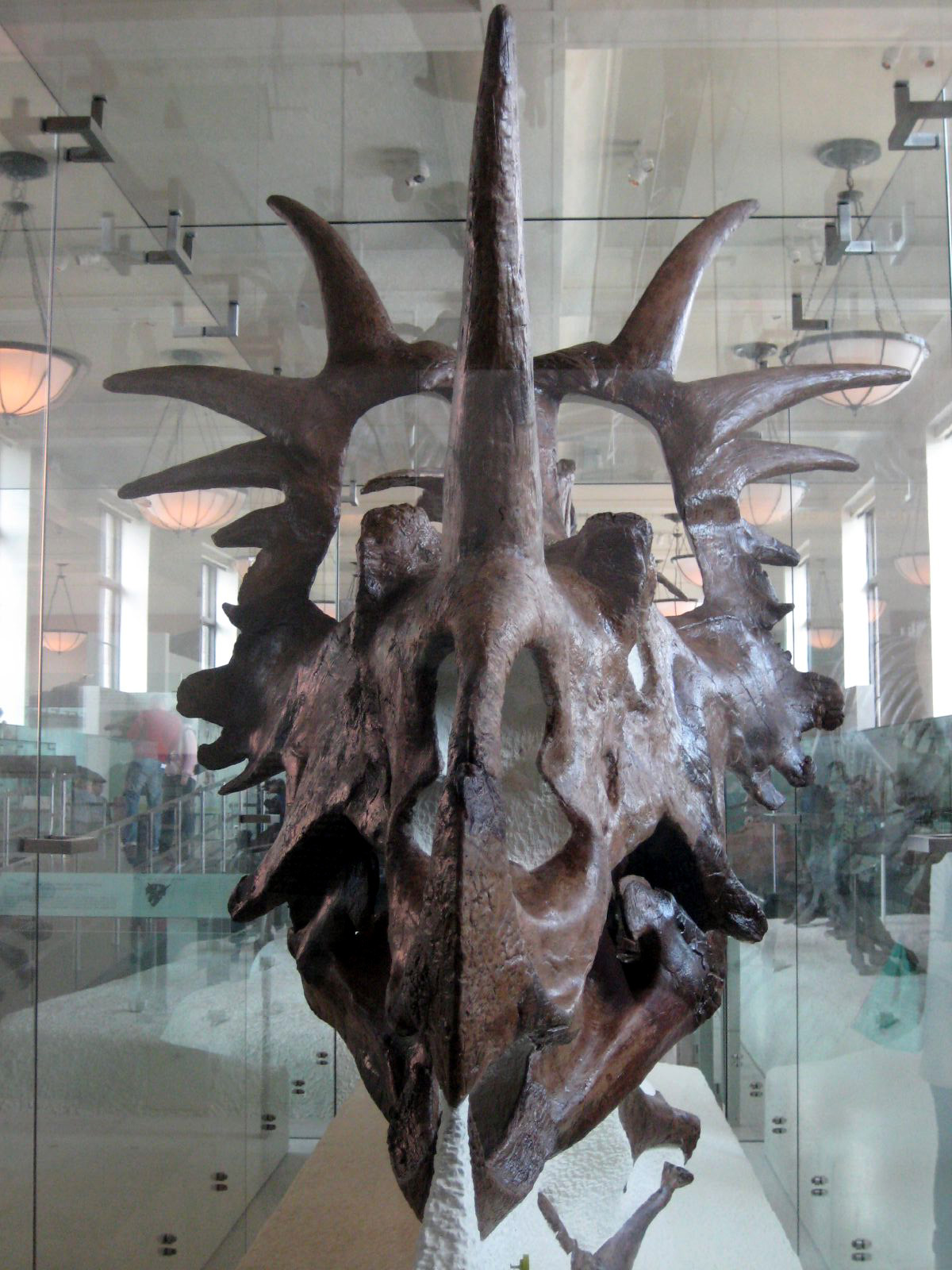
Skeleton of Styracosaurus

=== Storage facilities ===
Most of the museum's collections of mammalian and dinosaur fossils remain hidden from public view and are kept in many repositories deep within the museum complex. The most significant storage facility among these is the ten-story Childs Frick Building, which started construction in 1969 and was completed in 1973. When the Frick Building was completed, the museum's collection of fossilized mammals and dinosaurs was the world's largest such collection, weighing 600 short tons (540 long tons; 540 t). The Frick Building's top three floors contain laboratories and offices.

Other areas of the museum contain repositories of life from the past. The Whale Bone Storage Room is a cavernous space in which powerful winches come down from the ceiling to move the giant fossil bones about. The museum attic upstairs includes even more storage facilities, such as the Elephant Room, while the tusk vault and boar vault are downstairs from the attic.

=== Public displays ===
The great fossil collections that are open to public view occupy the entire fourth floor of the museum. The fourth floor exhibits are accessed by the Miriam and Ira D. Wallach Orientation Center, which opened in 1996. On the 77th Street side of the museum the visitor begins in the Orientation Center and follows a carefully marked path, which takes the visitor along an evolutionary tree of life. As the tree "branches" the visitor is presented with the familial relationships among vertebrates, called cladograms. A video projection on the museum's fourth floor introduces visitors to the concept of the cladogram.

Many of the fossils on display represent unique and historic pieces that were collected during the museum's golden era of worldwide expeditions (1880s–1930s). On a smaller scale, expeditions continue into the present and have resulted in additions to the collections from Vietnam, Madagascar, South America, and central and eastern Africa.

==== Halls ====
The first dinosaur hall in the museum opened in 1905. The 4th floor includes the following halls:

- Hall of Saurischian Dinosaurs (recognized by their grasping hand, long mobile neck, and the downward/forward position of the pubis bone, they are forerunners of the modern bird)
- Hall of Ornithischian Dinosaurs (defined for a pubic bone that points toward the back)
- Hall of Vertebrate Origins
- Hall of Primitive Mammals
- Hall of Advanced Mammals

The dinosaur halls were temporarily closed for renovation starting in 1990. The first halls to reopen were the primitive-mammal and advanced-mammal halls, part of the Lila Acheson Wallace Wing of Mammals and Their Extinct Relatives, which opened in 1994. The Halls of Saurischian Dinosaurs and Ornithischian Dinosaurs reopened in 1995 as part of a $12 million expansion. The Hall of Vertebrate Origins opened in 1996.

==== Fossils on display ====
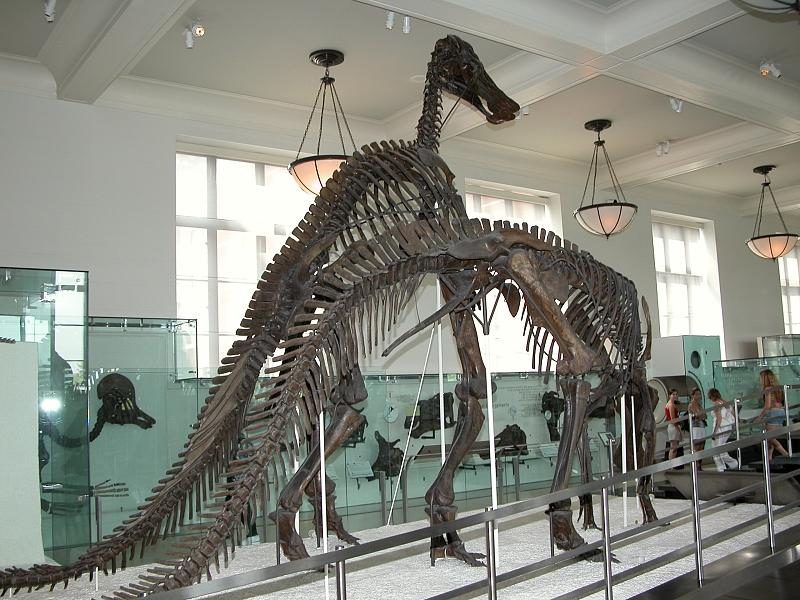
Edmontosaurus annectens fossil skeletons

The fossils on display include:

- Tyrannosaurus rex: Composed almost entirely of real fossil bones, it is mounted in a horizontal stalking pose balanced on powerful legs. The specimen is actually composed of fossil bones from two T. rex skeletons discovered in Montana in 1902 and 1908 by famous dinosaur hunter Barnum Brown.
- Mammuthus: Larger than its relative the woolly mammoth, these fossils are from an animal that lived 11,000 years ago in Indiana.
- Apatosaurus or Brontosaurus: This giant specimen was discovered at the end of the 19th century. Although most of its fossil bones are original, the skull is not, since none was found on site. The skeleton is composed primarily of the specimen AMNH 460, as well as specimens AMNH 222, AMNH 339, AMNH 592, and casts of the Brontosaurus excelsus holotype YPM 1980. It was only many years later that the first Apatosaurus skull was discovered, and so a plaster cast of that skull was made and placed on the museum's mount. A Camarasaurus skull had been used mistakenly until a correct skull was found. It is not entirely certain whether this specimen is a Brontosaurus or an Apatosaurus, and therefore it is considered an "unidentified apatosaurine", as it could also potentially be its own genus and species.
- Brontops: Extinct mammal distantly related to the horse and rhinoceros. It lived 35 million years ago in what is now South Dakota. It is noted for its magnificent and unusual pair of horns.
- A skeleton of Edmontosaurus annectens, a large herbivorous ornithopod dinosaur. The specimen is an example of a "mummified" dinosaur fossil in which the soft tissue and skin impressions were imbedded in the surrounding rock. The specimen is mounted as it was found, lying on its side with its legs drawn up and head drawn backwards.
- On September 26, 2007, an 80-million-year-old, 2 ft (61 cm) diameter fossil of an ammonite, which is composed entirely of the gemstone ammolite, made its debut at the museum. Neil Landman, curator of fossil invertebrates, explained that ammonites (shelled cephalopod mollusks in the subclass Ammonoidea) became extinct 66 million years ago, in the same extinction event that killed the dinosaurs. Korite International donated the fossil after its discovery in Alberta, Canada.
- One skeleton of an Allosaurus scavenging from a Brontosaurus corpse based on fossils found at Bone Cabin Quarry preserving large bite marks on Apatosaurine vertebrae.
- The only known skull of Andrewsarchus mongoliensis.
- A display of various species of ground sloths including Megalocnus rodens, Scelidotherium cuvieri, Megalonyx wheatleyi and Glossotherium robustus

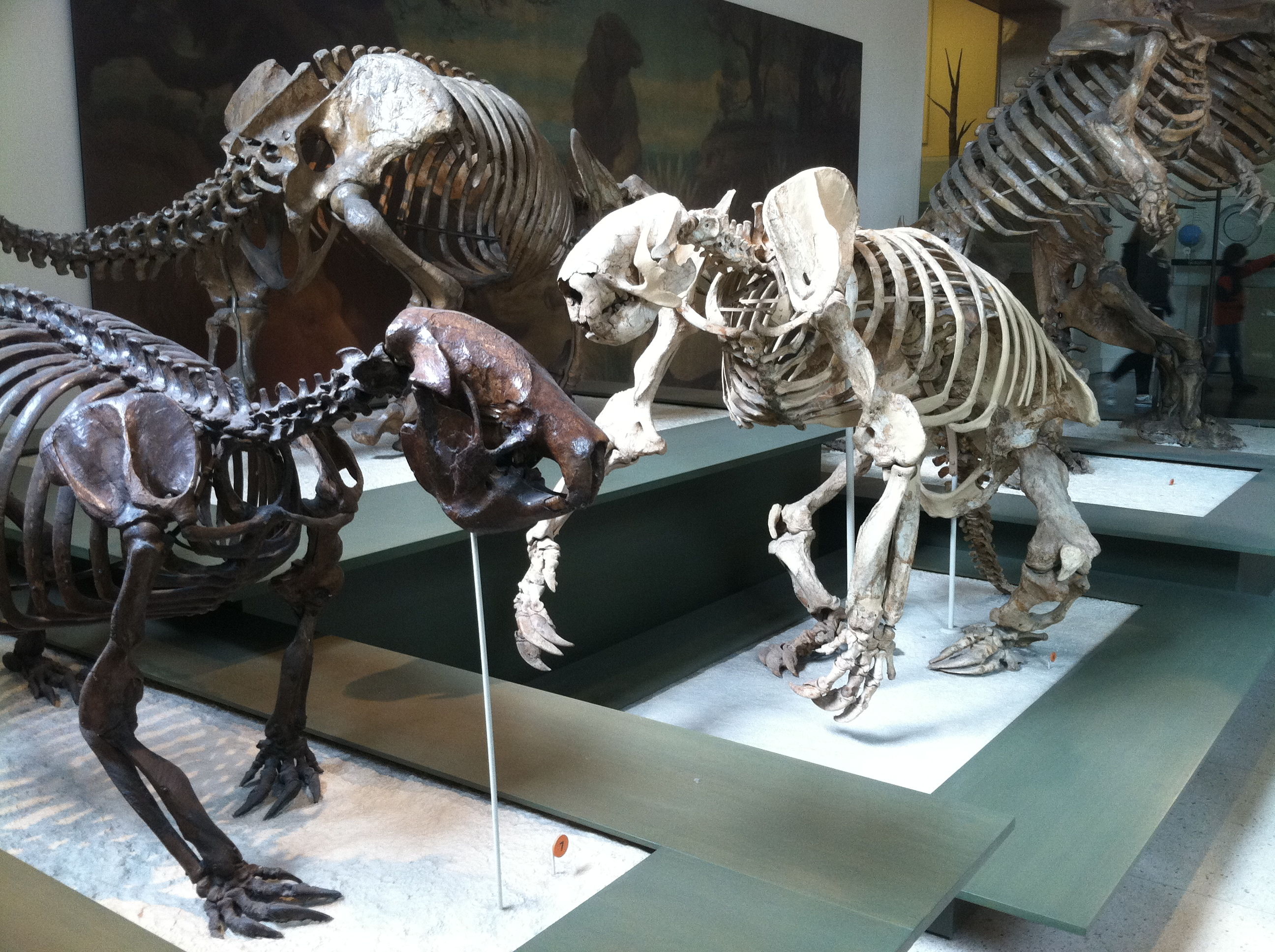
A display of various species of ground sloths (from left) Megalocnus rodens, Scelidotherium cuvieri, Megalonyx wheatleyi, Glossotherium robustus

A Triceratops and a Stegosaurus (nicknamed Apex) are also both on display, among many other specimens.

Besides the fossils in museum display, many specimens are stored in the collections available for scientists. Those include important specimens such as complete diplodocid skull, tyrannosaurid teeth, sauropod vertebrae, and many holotypes.

== Rose Center for Earth and Space ==
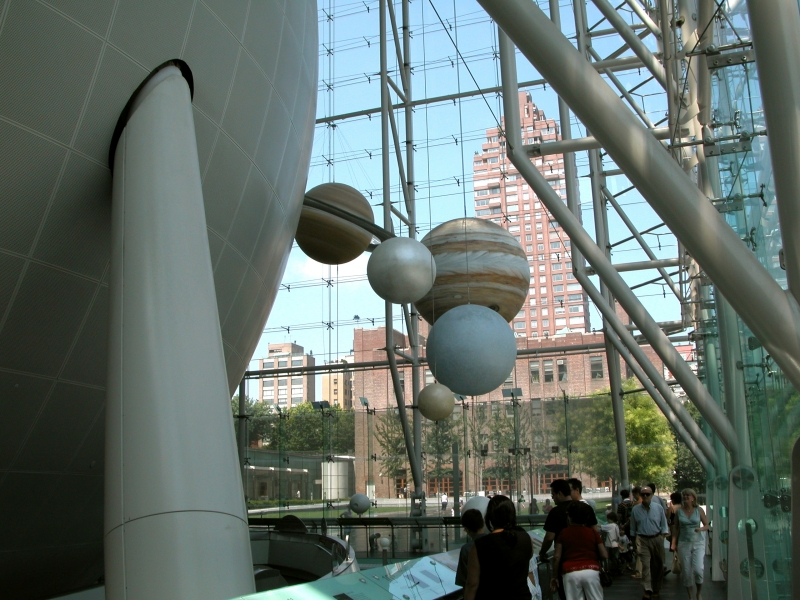
Rose Center for Earth and Space

The Hayden Planetarium, connected to the museum, is now part of the Rose Center for Earth and Space on the north side of the museum. The original Hayden Planetarium was founded in 1933 with a donation by philanthropist Charles Hayden, and it opened in 1935. The AMNH announced the modern Rose Center for Earth and Space in early 1995, and demolition began the same year.

The Frederick Phineas and Sandra Priest Rose Center for Earth and Space was completed in 2000 at a cost of $210 million. Designed by James Stewart Polshek, the new building consists of a six-story high glass cube enclosing an 87 ft (27 m) illuminated sphere that appears to float, although it is actually supported by truss work. Polshek has referred to his work as a "cosmic cathedral". The sphere is known as the Space Theater.

The facility encloses 333,500 sq ft (30,980 m^{2}) of research, education, and exhibition space as well as the Hayden planetarium. Also in the facility is the Department of Astrophysics, the newest academic research department in the museum. Neil DeGrasse Tyson is the director of the Hayden Planetarium. In addition, Polshek designed the 1,800 sq ft (170 m^{2}) Weston Pavilion, a 43 ft (13 m) high transparent structure of "water white" glass along the museum's west facade. This structure, a small companion piece to the Rose Center, offers a new entry way to the museum as well as opening further exhibition space for astronomically related objects. The Heilbrun Cosmic Pathway is one of the most popular exhibits in the Rose Center.

== Richard Gilder Center for Science, Education, and Innovation ==
Designed by Studio Gang and landscape architects Reed Hilderbrand, the Richard Gilder Center for Science, Education and Innovation opened in May 2023. The 230,000-square-foot addition includes six floors above ground, and one below. The Gilder Center welcomes visitors with a new, accessible entrance on Columbus Avenue that connects to central five-story atrium and creates more than 30 connections to the existing museum. The atrium's architecture, described as cavern or canyon-like, is informed by natural processes like the movement of wind and water that shape geological landscapes. To achieve the continuous visual form, the atrium is constructed with shotcrete. The curvilinear façade contrasts with the earlier High Victorian Gothic, Richardson Romanesque, and Beaux Arts structures, but its Milford Pink granite cladding is the same stone used on the Museum's west side.

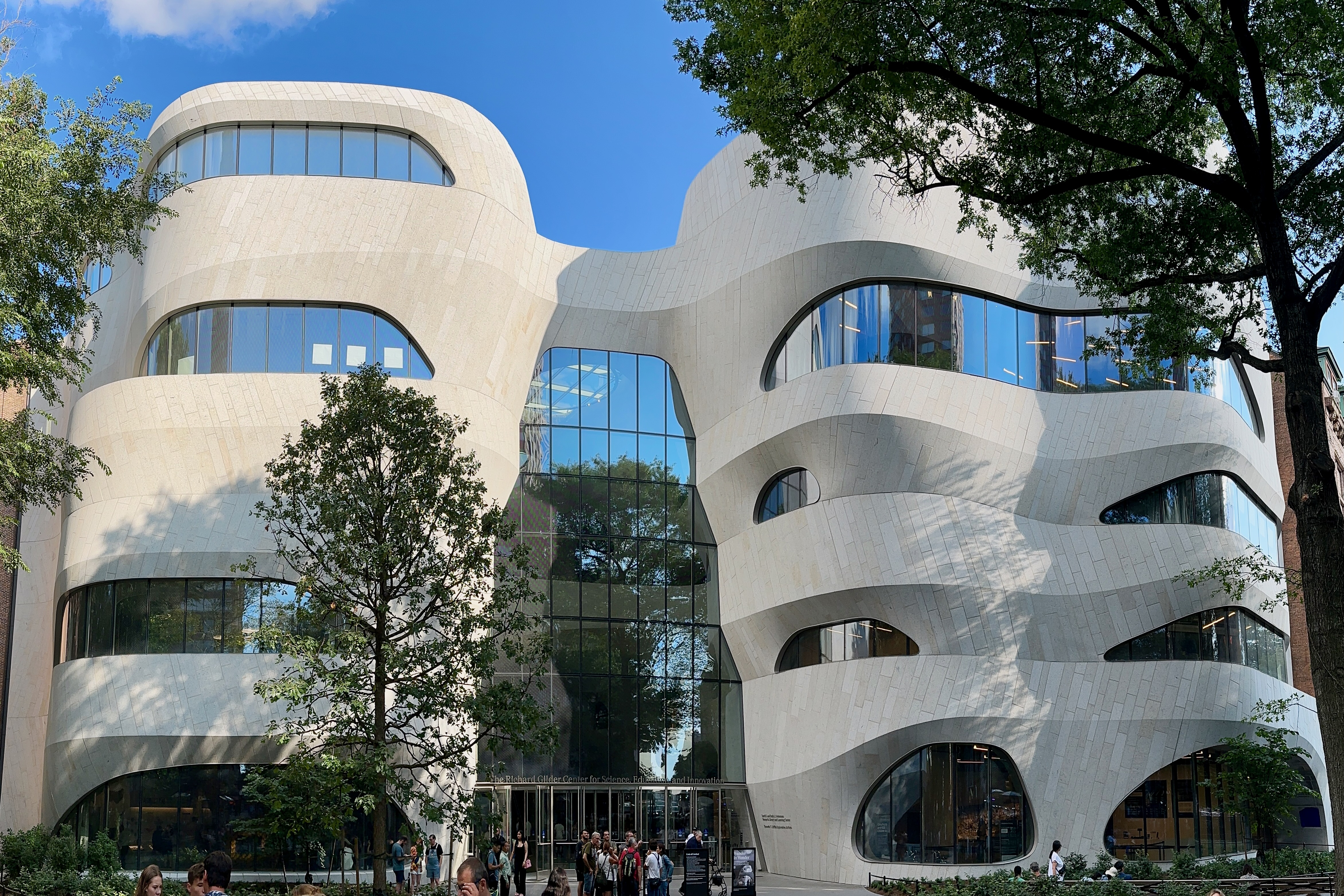
Richard Gilder Center

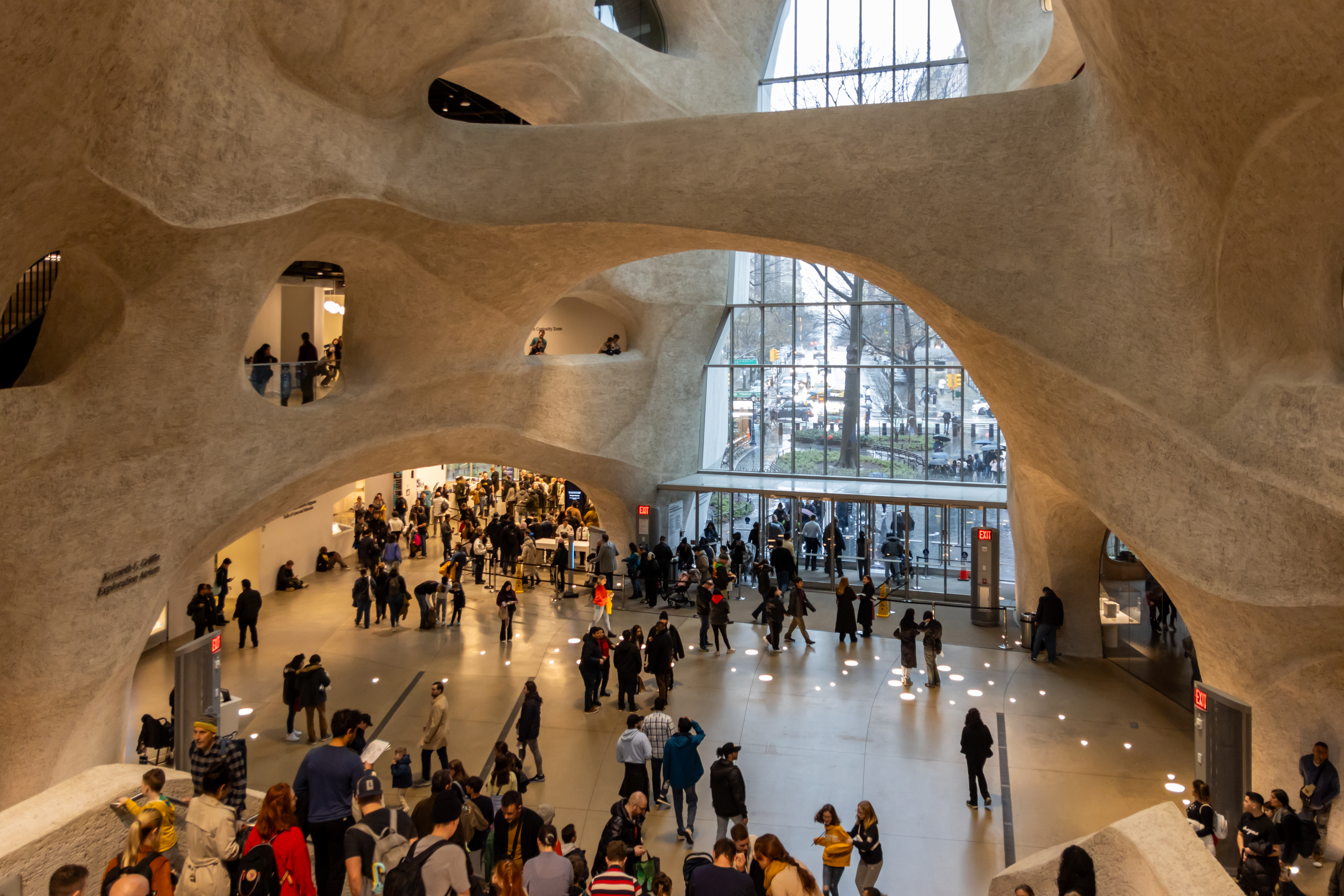
Inside the Richard Gilder Center

The Richard Gilder Center houses new exhibition and display areas devoted to insects, including an insectarium and butterfly vivarium, where visitors can walk among hundreds of live specimens as they flutter about in a lush tropical setting. It also includes a visible storage structure that houses and displays scientific specimens; an expanded research library; classrooms and education areas, and laboratories. Another permanent fixture is an immersive and interactive video experience called "Invisible Worlds" that focuses on the vital, often hard-to-see connections that support life, such as the firing of brain neurons, the exchange of nutrients and water between tree roots, and the microscopic world of plankton in ocean ecosystems.

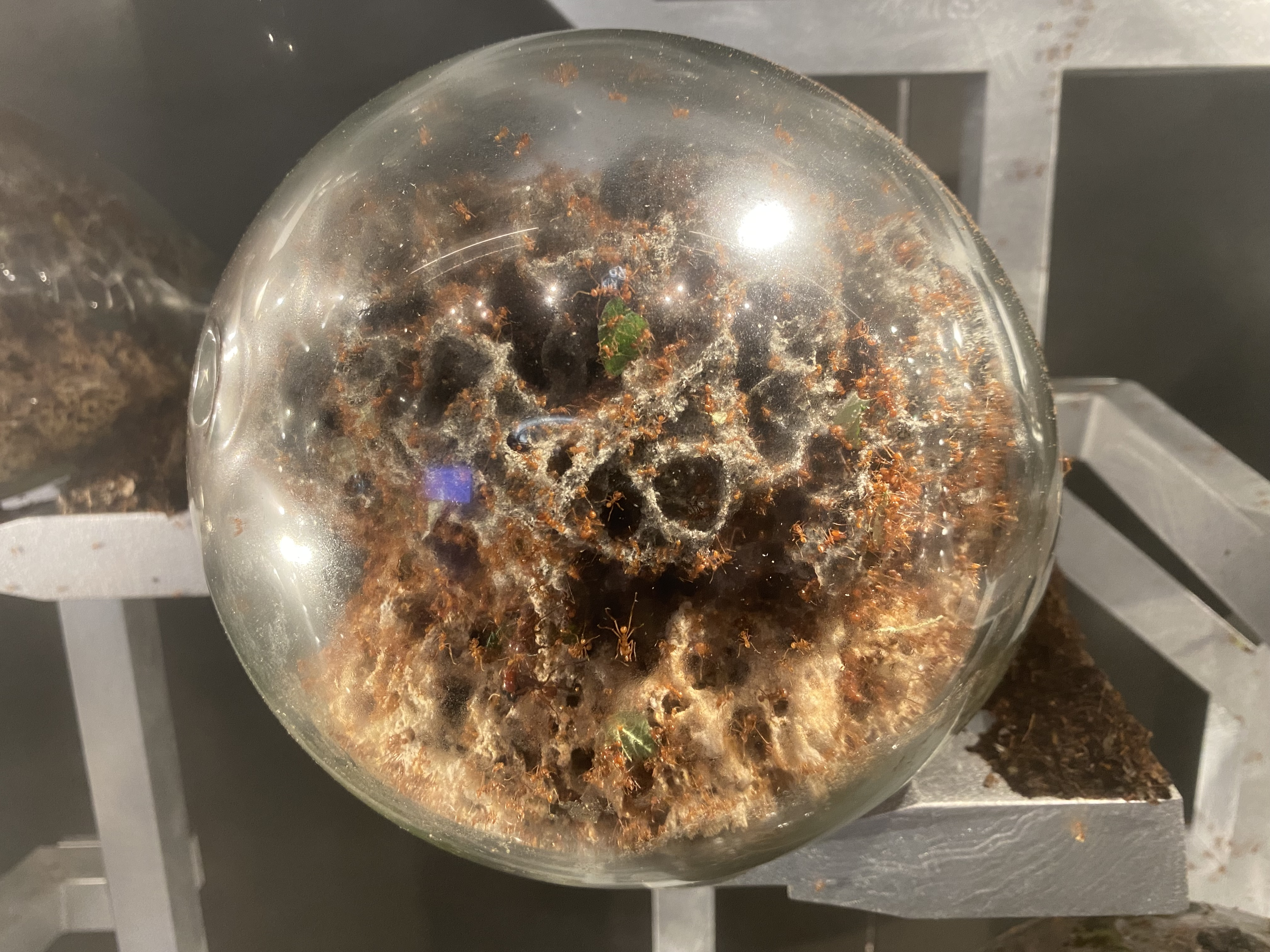
Leafcutter ant colony in the Gilder Center Insectarium

This expansion was originally supposed to be north of the existing museum, occupying parts of Theodore Roosevelt Park. The expansion was relocated to the west side of the existing museum, and its footprint was reduced in size, due to opposition to construction in the park. The annex replaced three existing buildings along Columbus Avenue's east side.

== Exhibitions Lab ==
Founded in 1869, the AMNH Exhibitions Lab has since produced thousands of installations. The department is notable for its integration of new scientific research into immersive art and multimedia presentations. In addition to the famous dioramas at its home museum and the Rose Center for Earth and Space, the lab has also produced international exhibitions and software such as the Digital Universe Atlas.

The exhibitions team currently consists of over sixty artists, writers, preparators, designers and programmers. The department is responsible for the creation of two to three exhibits per year. These extensive shows typically travel nationally to sister natural history museums. They have produced, among others, the first exhibits to discuss Darwinian evolution, human-induced climate change and the mesozoic mass extinction via asteroid.

== Research Library ==
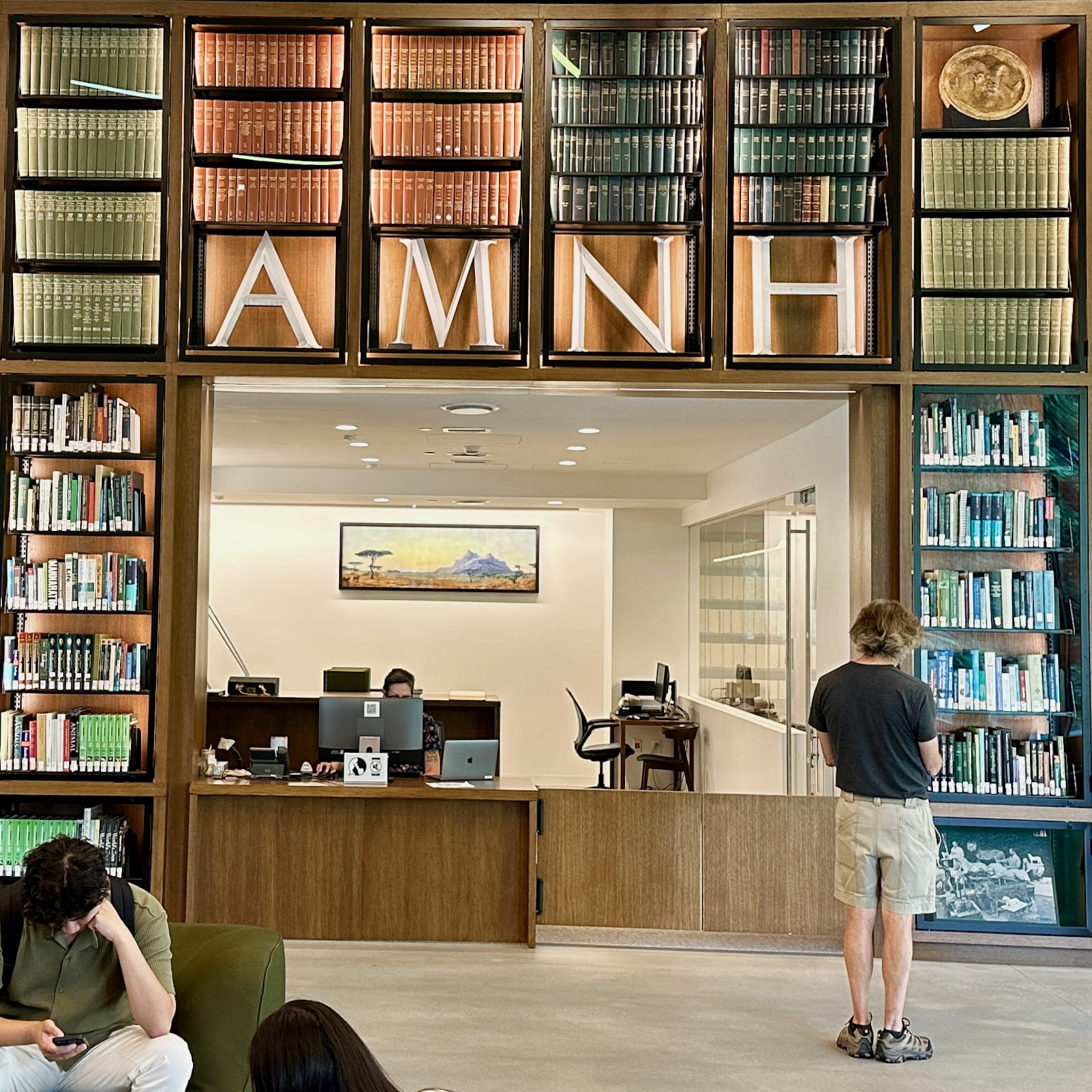
Reading room of the David S. and Ruth L. Gottesman Research Library and Learning Center

The Research Library is open to staff and public visitors, and is on the fourth floor of the museum. The Library collects materials covering such subjects as mammalogy, earth and planetary science, astronomy and astrophysics, anthropology, entomology, herpetology, ichthyology, paleontology, ethology, ornithology, mineralogy, invertebrates, systematics, ecology, oceanography, conchology, exploration and travel, history of science, museology, bibliography, genomics, and peripheral biological sciences. The collection has many retrospective materials, some going back to the 15th century, that are difficult to find elsewhere.

In its early years, the Library expanded its collection mostly through such gifts as John Clarkson Jay's conchological library, Carson Brevoort's library on fishes and general zoology, Daniel Giraud Elliot's ornithological library, S. Lowell Elliot's collection of books and pamphlets on various subjects, Harry Edwards's entomological library, the Hugh Jewett collection of voyages and travel, and Jules Marcou's geology collection. In the 1900s, the library continued to grow with donations from figures and organizations such as Egbert Viele, the American Ethnological Society, Joel Asaph Allen, Hermon Carey Bumpus, and Henry Fairfield Osborn.

The new Library was designed by the firm Roche-Dinkeloo in 1992. The space is 55,000 sq ft (5,100 m^{2}) and includes five different "conservation zones", including the 50-person reading room, public offices, and temperature- and humidity-controlled rooms. Today, the Library's collections contain over 550,000 volumes of monographs, serials, pamphlets, reprints, microforms, and original illustrations, as well as film, photographic, archives and manuscripts, fine art, memorabilia and rare book collections.

Special collections include:

- Institutional Archives, Manuscripts, and Personal Papers: Includes archival documents, field notebooks, clippings and other documents relating to the museum, its scientists and staff, scientific expeditions and research, museum exhibitions, education, and general administration.
- Art and Memorabilia Collection.
- Moving Image Collection.
- Vertical Files: Relating to exhibitions, expeditions, and museum operations.

== Activities ==
=== Research activities ===
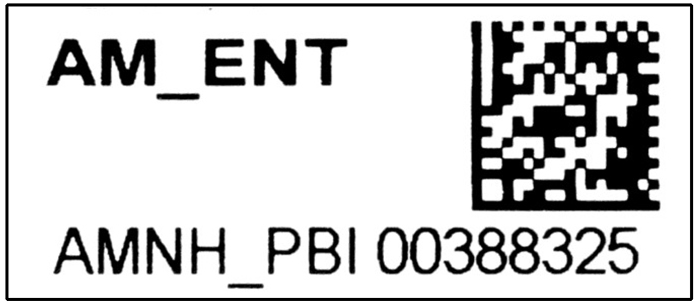
A matrix barcode that uniquely identifies a specimen in the museum's entomology collection.

The museum has a scientific staff of more than 225, and sponsors over 120 special field expeditions each year. Many of the fossils on display represent unique and historic pieces that were collected during the museum's golden era of worldwide expeditions (1880s–1930s). Examples of some of these expeditions, financed in whole or part by the AMNH are: Jesup North Pacific Expedition, the Whitney South Seas Expedition, the Roosevelt–Rondon Scientific Expedition, the Crocker Land Expedition, and the expeditions to Madagascar and New Guinea by Richard Archbold. On a smaller scale, expeditions continue into the present. The museum also publishes several peer-reviewed journals, including the Bulletin of the American Museum of Natural History.

==== Southwestern Research Station ====
The AMNH operates a biological field station in Portal, Arizona, among the Chiricahua Mountains. The Southwestern Research Station was established in 1955, purchased with a grant from philanthropist David Rockefeller, and with entomologist Mont Cazier as its first director. The station, in a "biodiversity hotspot", is used by researchers and students, and offers occasional seminars to the public.

=== Educational outreach ===
AMNH's education programs include outreach to schools in New York City by the Moveable Museum. The AMNH offers a wide variety of educational programs, camps, and classes for students from pre-K to post-graduate levels. The AMNH sponsors the Lang Science Program, a comprehensive 5th–12th grade research and science education program, and the Science Research Mentorship Program (SRMP), in which pairs of students conduct a full year of intensive original research with an AMNH scientist. As of 2023, about 400,000 schoolchildren annually take field trips to the AMNH. Although most students visit for a day or less, since late 2023 the museum has also provided a weeklong educational program called Beyond Elementary Explorations in Science.

=== Richard Gilder Graduate School ===
On October 23, 2006, the museum launched the Richard Gilder Graduate School, becoming the first American museum in the United States to award doctoral degrees in its own name. The school is named for businessman Richard Gilder, who contributed $50 million toward the school. Accredited in 2009, the school had 11 students enrolled in 2011, who work closely with curators and have access to the collections. The first seven graduates were awarded their degrees in 2013. The AMNH offers a Master of Arts in Teaching (MAT) in Earth Science and a PhD in Comparative Biology.

The MAT Earth Science Residency program was launched in 2012 to address a critical shortage of qualified science teachers in New York state. In 2015, the MAT program officially joined the Richard Gilder Graduate School, with the NYS Board of Regents authorizing the Gilder School to grant the MAT degree.

== Notable people ==
=== Presidents ===
The museum's first three presidents were all cofounders.

1. John David Wolfe (1869–1872)
2. Robert L. Stuart (1872–1881)
3. Morris K. Jesup (1881–1908), bequeathed $1 million to the museum upon his death.
4. Henry Fairfield Osborn (1908–1933)
5. F. Trubee Davison (1933–1951)
6. Alexander M. White (1951–1968)
7. Gardner D. Stout (1968–1975)
8. Robert Guestier Goelet (1975–1987)
9. George D. Langdon Jr., (1987–1993) the first president to receive a salary; all previous presidents had served without pay.
10. Ellen V. Futter (1993–2023), first female president
11. Sean M. Decatur (2023–present), first African American president

The fourth president, Henry Fairfield Osborn, appointed on the death of Jesup, consolidated the museum's expansion and developed it further. Under Osborn, the museum embraced a growing eugenics movement. Osborn's friend, noted eugenicist Madison Grant, a member of the museum's executive committee, was the author of the 1916 book, The Passing of the Great Race. He also was a funder and shaper of the 1921 Second International Congress of Eugenics, held at the museum. Noted eugenicist Charles Davenport presided over the 1932 Third International Eugenics Congress. at the museum as well.

=== Other associated names ===
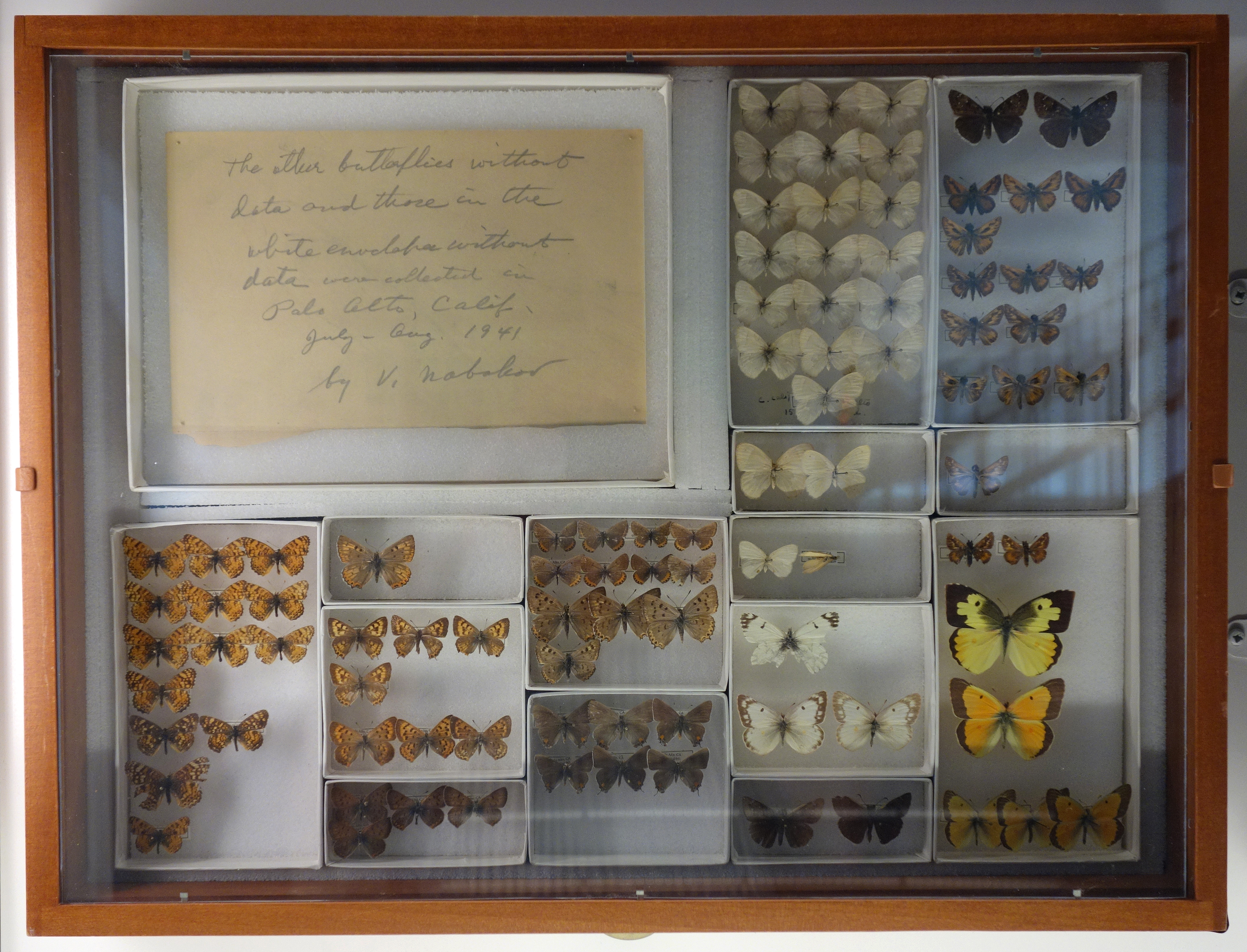
Butterflies collected by Vladimir Nabokov

Famous names associated with the museum include the dinosaur-hunter of the Gobi Desert, Roy Chapman Andrews; photographers Yvette Borup Andrews and George Gaylord Simpson; biologists Ernst Mayr and Stephen Jay Gould; pioneer cultural anthropologists Franz Boas and Margaret Mead; explorer and geographer Alexander H. Rice Jr.; and ornithologist Robert Cushman Murphy. Writer and lepidopterist Vladimir Nabokov volunteered at the museum in 1940–41.

== Surroundings ==
The museum is at 79th Street and Central Park West. There is a direct entrance into the museum from the New York City Subway's 81st Street–Museum of Natural History station, served by the B and C trains.

On a pedestal outside the museum's Columbus Avenue entrance is a stainless steel time capsule, which was created after a design competition that was won by Santiago Calatrava. The capsule was sealed at the beginning of 2000, to mark the beginning of the 3rd millennium. It takes the form of a folded saddle-shaped volume, symmetrical on multiple axes, that explores formal properties of folded spherical frames. Calatrava described it as "a flower". The capsule is to be opened in the year 3000.

The museum is in a 17-acre (69,000 m^{2}) city park known as Theodore Roosevelt Park that extends from Central Park West to Columbus Avenue, and from West 77th to 81st Streets and that contains park benches, gardens and lawns, and also a dog run. On the west side of the park, between 80th and 81st Streets near Columbus Avenue, is the Nobel Monument honoring Nobel Prize winners from the United States.

== Commentary ==
In 2019, Hamid Dabashi, the Hagop Kevorkian Professor of Iranian Studies and Comparative Literature at Columbia University, wrote an opinion piece in Al Jazeera criticizing a bronze statue of Theodore Roosevelt, depicting him on horseback above a nameless Native American and African American individual. Having visited the museum, Dabashi reflected on the juxtaposition of scientific progress and what he sees as the persistent legacy of racism in the United States. The statue of Theodore Roosevelt is seen by Dabashi as a symbol of racial hierarchy and the ongoing struggle to reconcile the nation's past with its present. The statue would later be removed in 2022, as a consequence of discussions about racism aroused by the 2020 protests surrounding the murder of George Floyd.

A 2020 article by University of New Hampshire historian Julia Rodriguez contrasts the approaches respectively taken by the AMNH and the Musée de l'Homme in Paris, in terms of their human and cultural exhibits. While Rodriguez criticizes the AMNH's exhibits for their failure to acknowledge colonial histories, the Musée de l'Homme has made strides in decolonizing its displays. Rodriguez also posits that notably absent from such museums are exhibits dedicated to Northern European or New England cultures, suggesting a biased focus on "othering" non-Western societies while normalizing Western cultural norms.

In a June 2024 essay published in Indian online paper ThePrint, Stanford University history professor Priya Satia argues that the museum's Hall of Asian Peoples is problematic because it portrays Asian cultures as static and frozen in time. Satia believes various misrepresentations can lead to misunderstandings and perpetuate harmful biases against Asian and Middle Eastern people. In the same essay, Satia also delves into parts of the museum's own history, such as its 1921 hosting of the Second International Eugenics Congress. Her essay was criticized by Samuel Abrams, who serves as a Nonresident Senior Fellow of the American Enterprise Institute, as a researcher at NYU, and as a Professor of Politics at Sarah Lawrence College. Abrams states that "Critiquing an outdated museum is fine, but nothing about Satia’s thread was constructive or helpful."

== In popular culture ==
The museum is featured in many works of art and popular culture, including:

- A large portion of the 2017 film Wonderstruck takes place in the museum, showing the museum in 1927 as well as 1977.
- The museum in the film Night at the Museum (2006) is based on a 1993 book that was set at the AMNH (The Night at the Museum). The interior scenes were shot at a sound stage in Vancouver, British Columbia, but exterior shots of the museum's facade were done at the actual AMNH. AMNH officials have credited the movie with increasing the number of visitors during the holiday season in 2006 by almost 20 percent. Its sequels, Night at the Museum: Battle of the Smithsonian (2009) and Night at the Museum: Secret of the Tomb (2014), were also partially set in this museum.
- The main characters of the 2023 graphic novel Roaming visit the AMNH.
- The museum was the setting for the 1970 novel The Great Dinosaur Robbery by David Forrest, but was not featured in the film adaptation One of Our Dinosaurs Is Missing, which was set in the Natural History Museum in London, England.
- As the "New York Museum of Natural History", the museum is a favorite setting in many Douglas Preston and Lincoln Child novels, including Relic (1995), Reliquary (1997), The Cabinet of Curiosities (2002), The Book of the Dead (2007), and Blue Labyrinth (2014). FBI Special Agent Aloysius X. L. Pendergast plays a major role in all of these thrillers. Preston was manager of publications at the museum before embarking upon his fiction writing career.
- The museum has appeared repeatedly in the fiction of dark fantasy author Caitlín R. Kiernan, including appearances in her fifth novel Daughter of Hounds, her work on the DC/Vertigo comic book The Dreaming (#47, "Trinket"), and many of her short stories, including "Valentia" and "Onion" (both collected in To Charles Fort, With Love, 2005).
- The 2005 film The Squid and the Whale takes its name from the diorama of the giant squid and the sperm whale in the museum's Hall of Ocean Life. The diorama is shown in the film's final scene.
- The plot of the 1993 film We're Back! A Dinosaur's Story revolves around the museum, with all four dinosaurs finally reaching the AMNH at the end.
- In the 1966 US version of the 1955 Czechoslovak film, Journey to the Beginning of Time, the four boys end their journey on a bench inside the AMNH's 77th St. entrance, beneath the exhibit of the long-boat, in which they'd had their adventure. While the story could be dismissed as a dream, one boy's journal has somehow suffered all the wear-and-tear of their journey through prehistoric eras. A dubbed and partly re-filmed US version of the film was released in 1966 under the title Journey to the Beginning of Time.
- The 1914 animated film Gertie the Dinosaur was set in the Museum.
- In the NBC sitcom Friends, Ross works in the museum from 1994 until he is fired in 1999. In the 1996 episode "The One Where Ross and Rachel...You Know", Ross and Rachel have sex in one of the exhibits, stunning a group of schoolchildren when they wake up the following morning.
- In the 1998 video game Parasite Eve, the museum featured as part of the important plot in the story and as one of the catalytic locations for the protagonist Aya Brea.

== Gallery ==
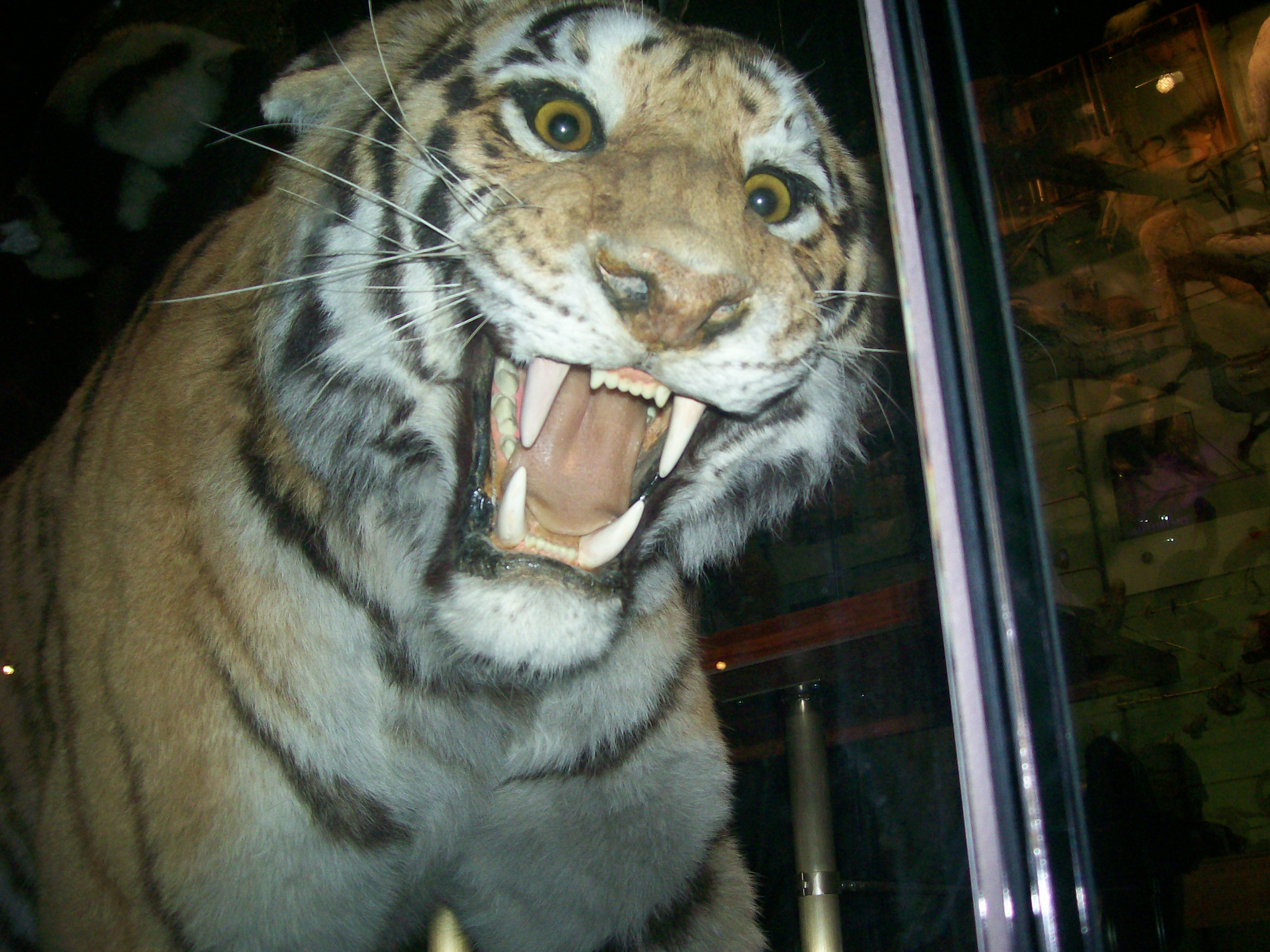
Siberian tiger at the American Museum of Natural History

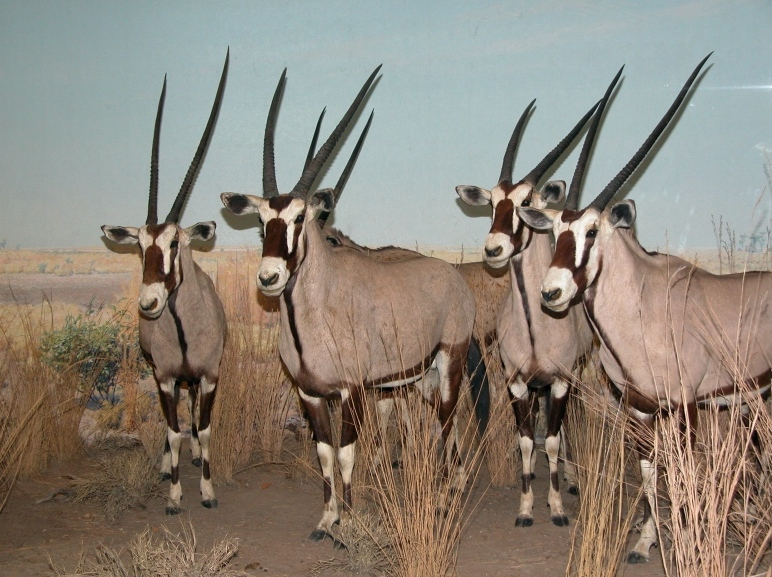
Diorama in Akeley Hall of African Mammals

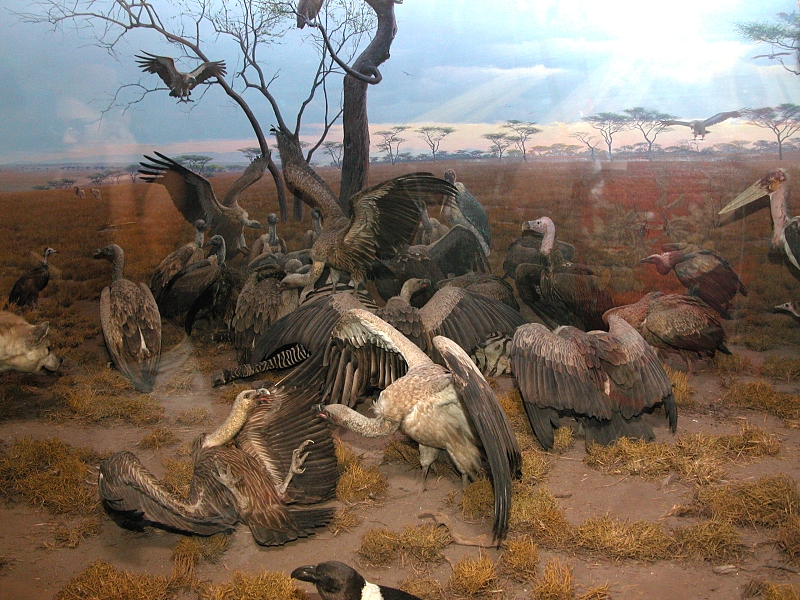
Diorama in Akeley Hall of African Mammals

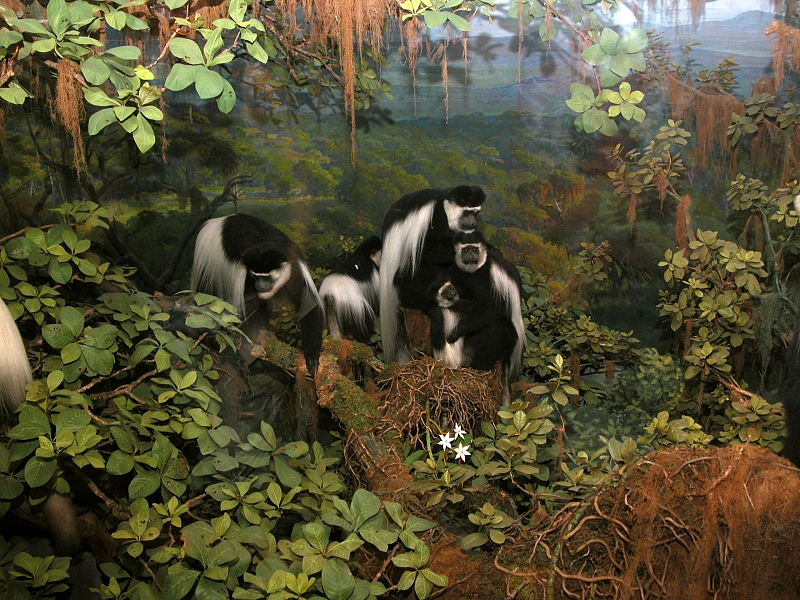
Diorama in Akeley Hall of African Mammals

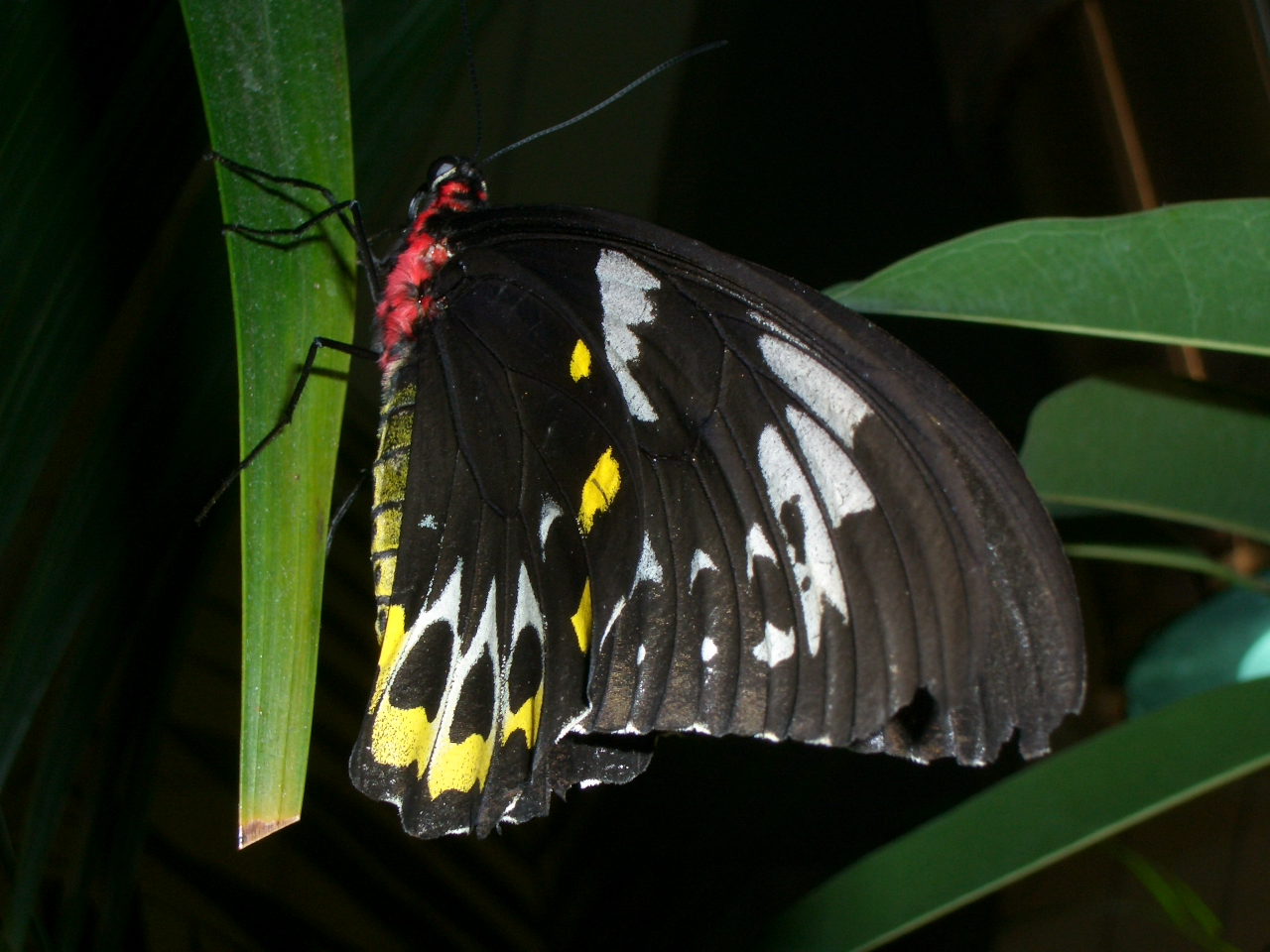
Butterfly Conservatory

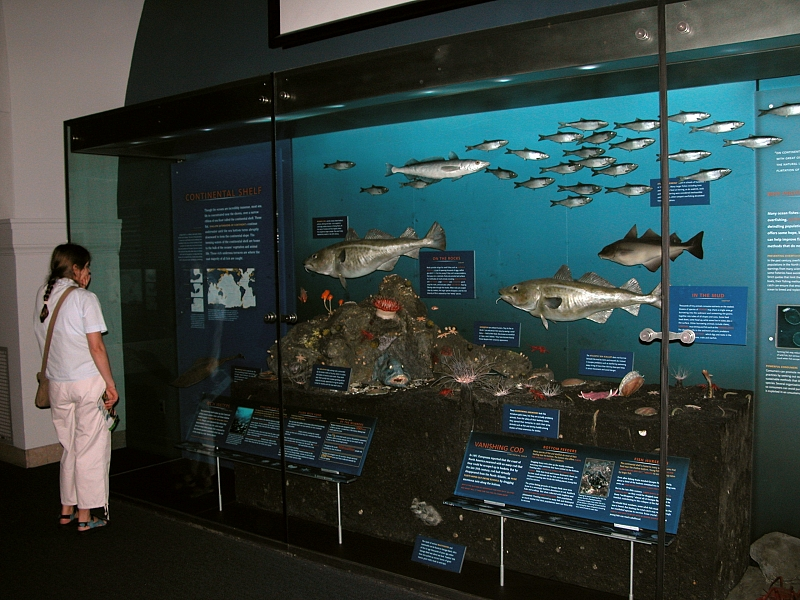
Display in Milstein Hall of Ocean Life

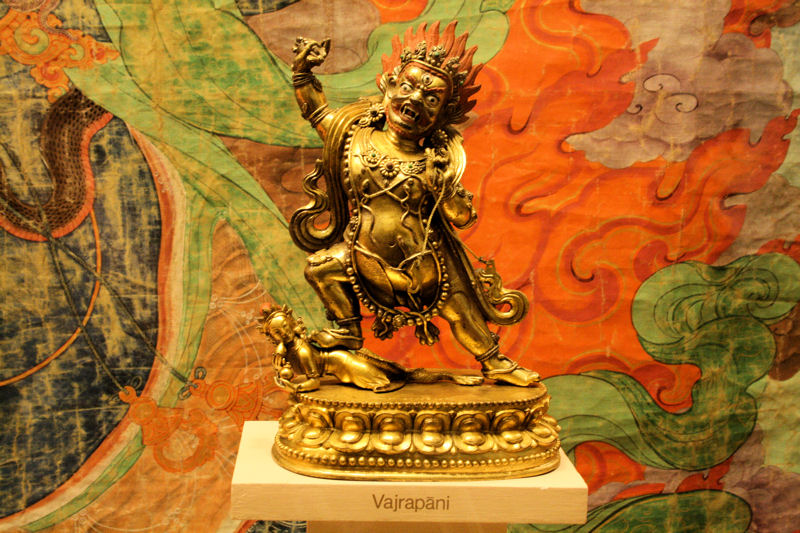
Tibetan Vajrapani statue

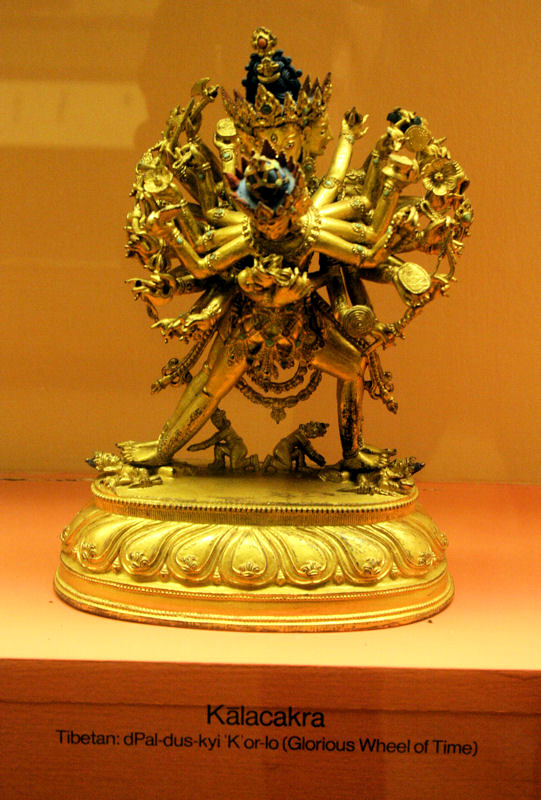
Tibetan Kalachakra statue

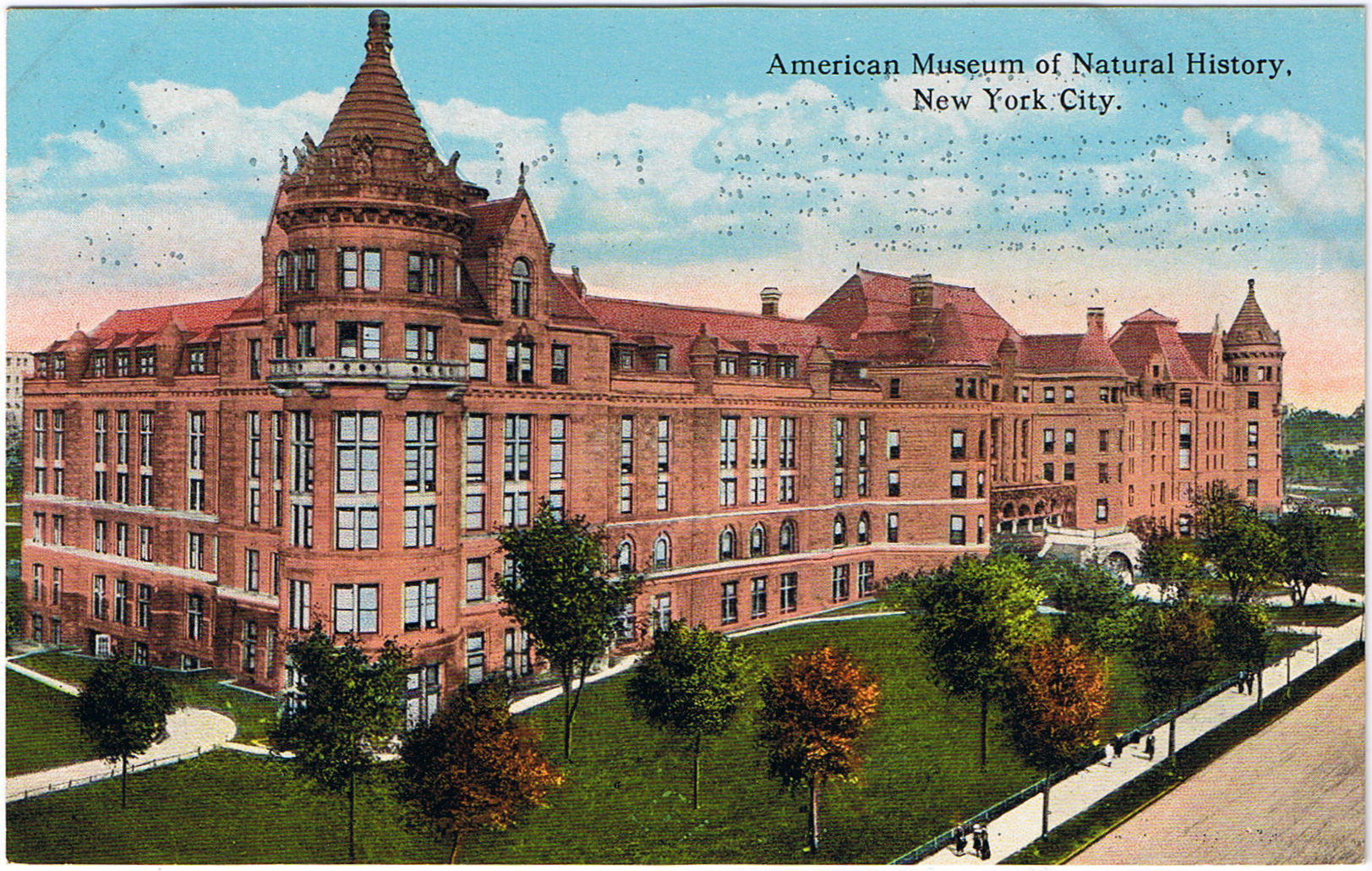
The museum's south range, and some of the west façade, in the 1920s

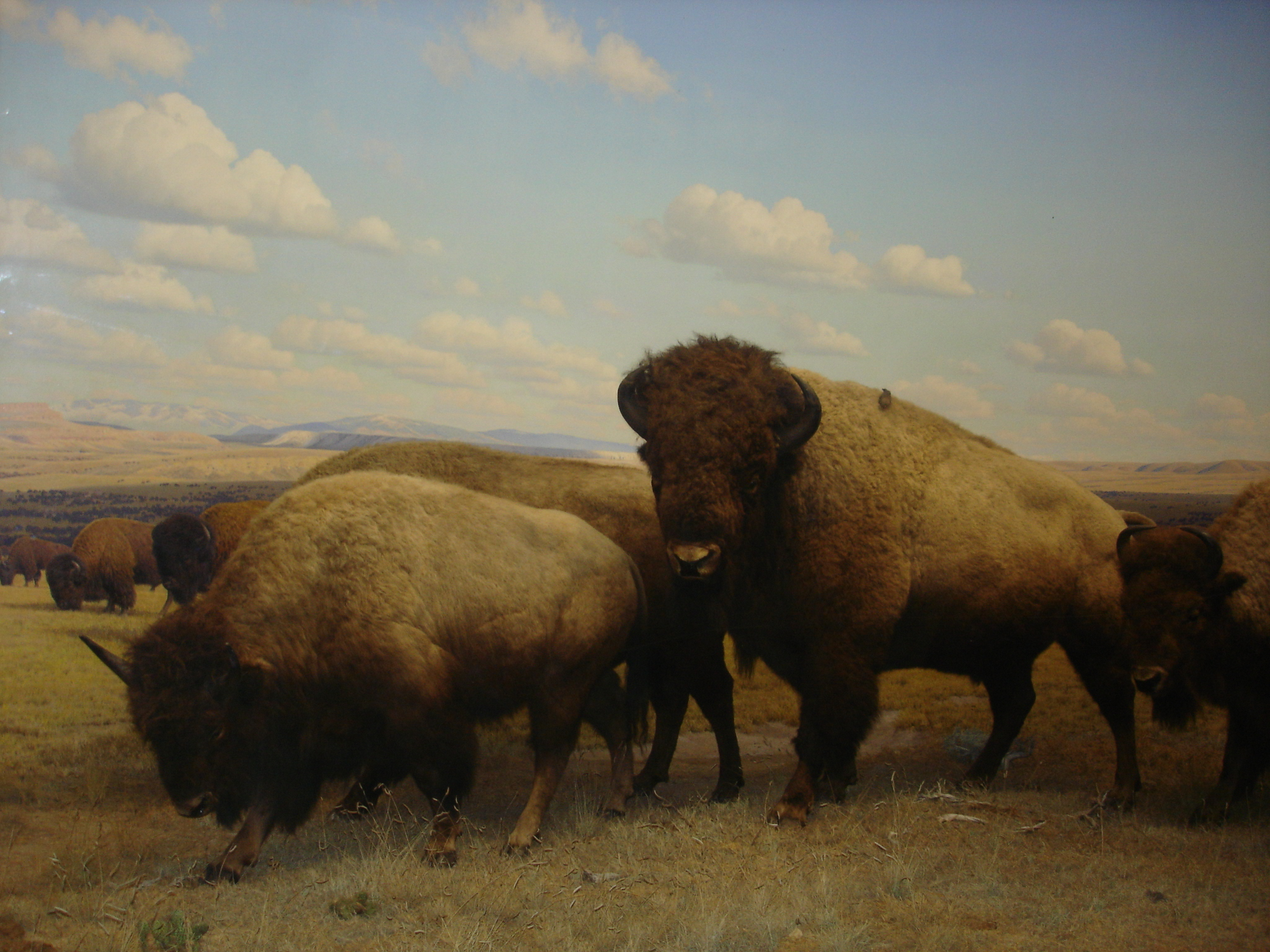
American bison and pronghorn diorama (right)

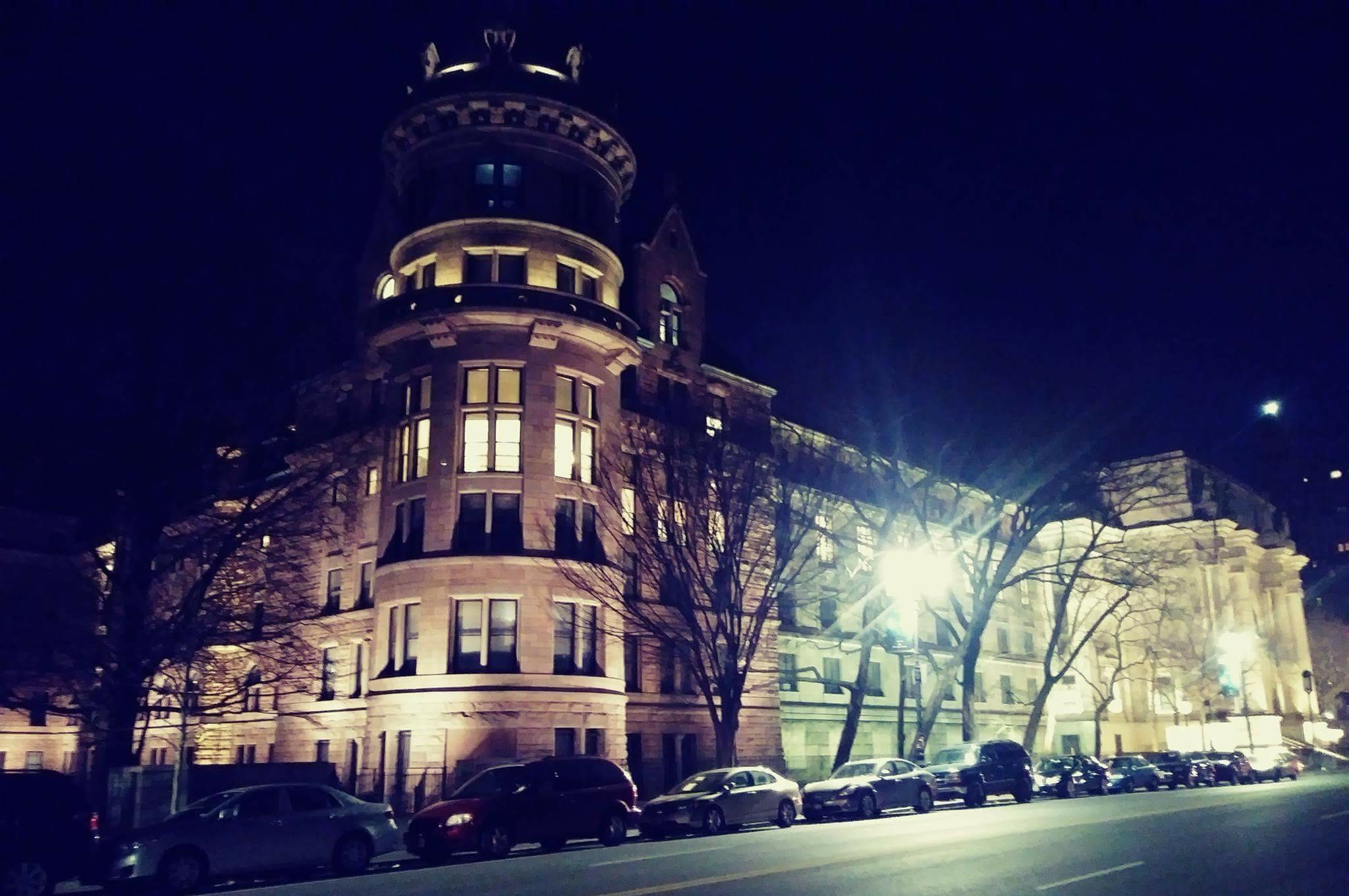
Night view of the museum, looking northwest from across Central Park West

== See also ==
- List of museums and cultural institutions in New York City
- List of most-visited museums in the United States
- List of New York City Designated Landmarks in Manhattan from 59th to 110th Streets
- National Register of Historic Places listings in Manhattan from 59th to 110th Streets
- Education in New York City
- Margaret Mead Film Festival
- Constantin Astori
