= Akeley (surname) =

Akeley is a surname. Notable people with the surname include:

- Carl Akeley (1864–1926), American naturalist, inventor, sculptor and photographer
- Delia Akeley (1875–1970), American explorer
- Kurt Akeley (born 1958), American computer graphics engineer
- Lewis Akeley (1861–1961), American academic
- Mary Jobe Akeley (1886–1966), American naturalist and explorer
