= AMNH Exhibitions Lab =

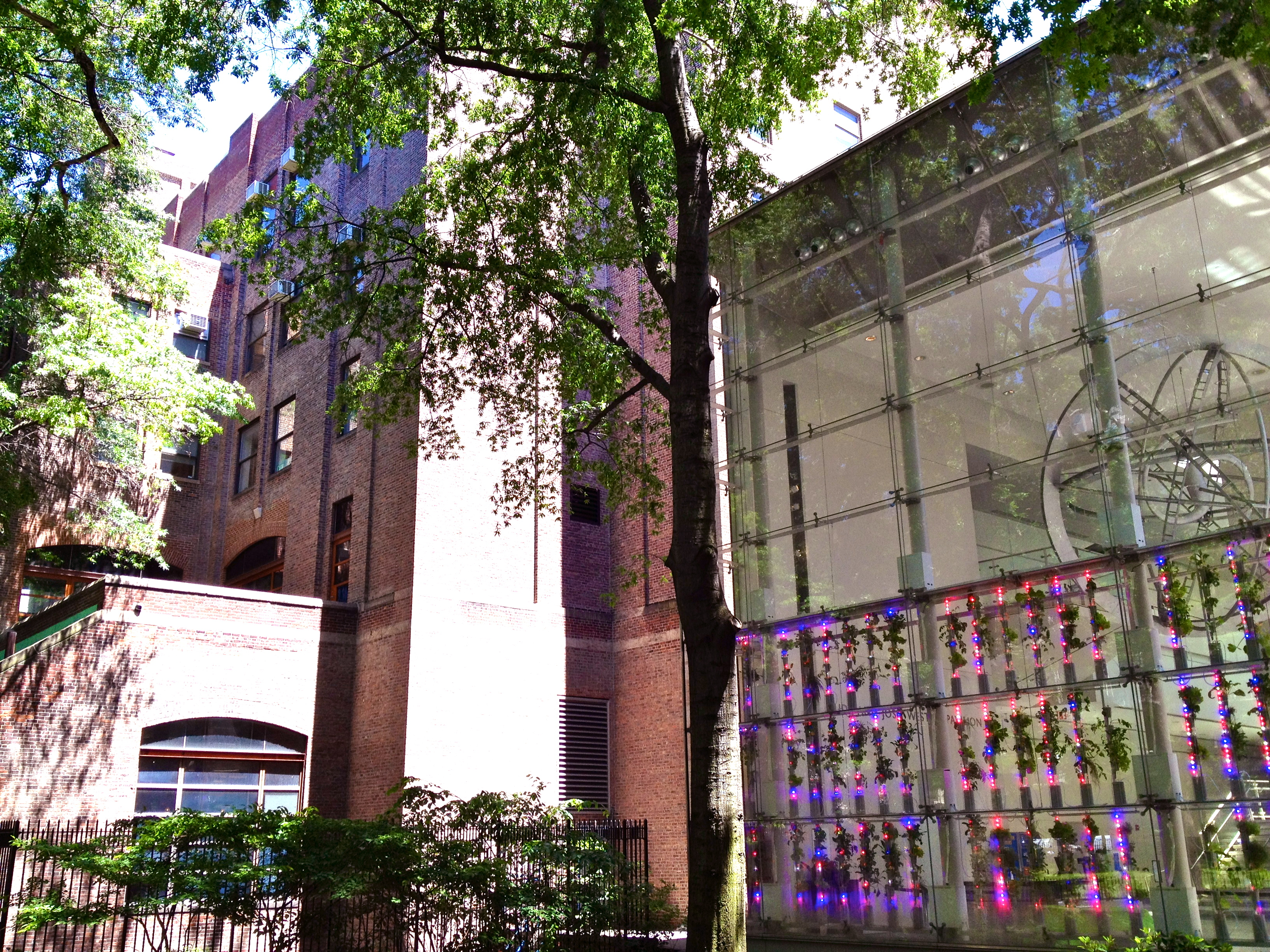
The Exhibition Department's headquarters is located on approximately 80th Street in Manhattan.

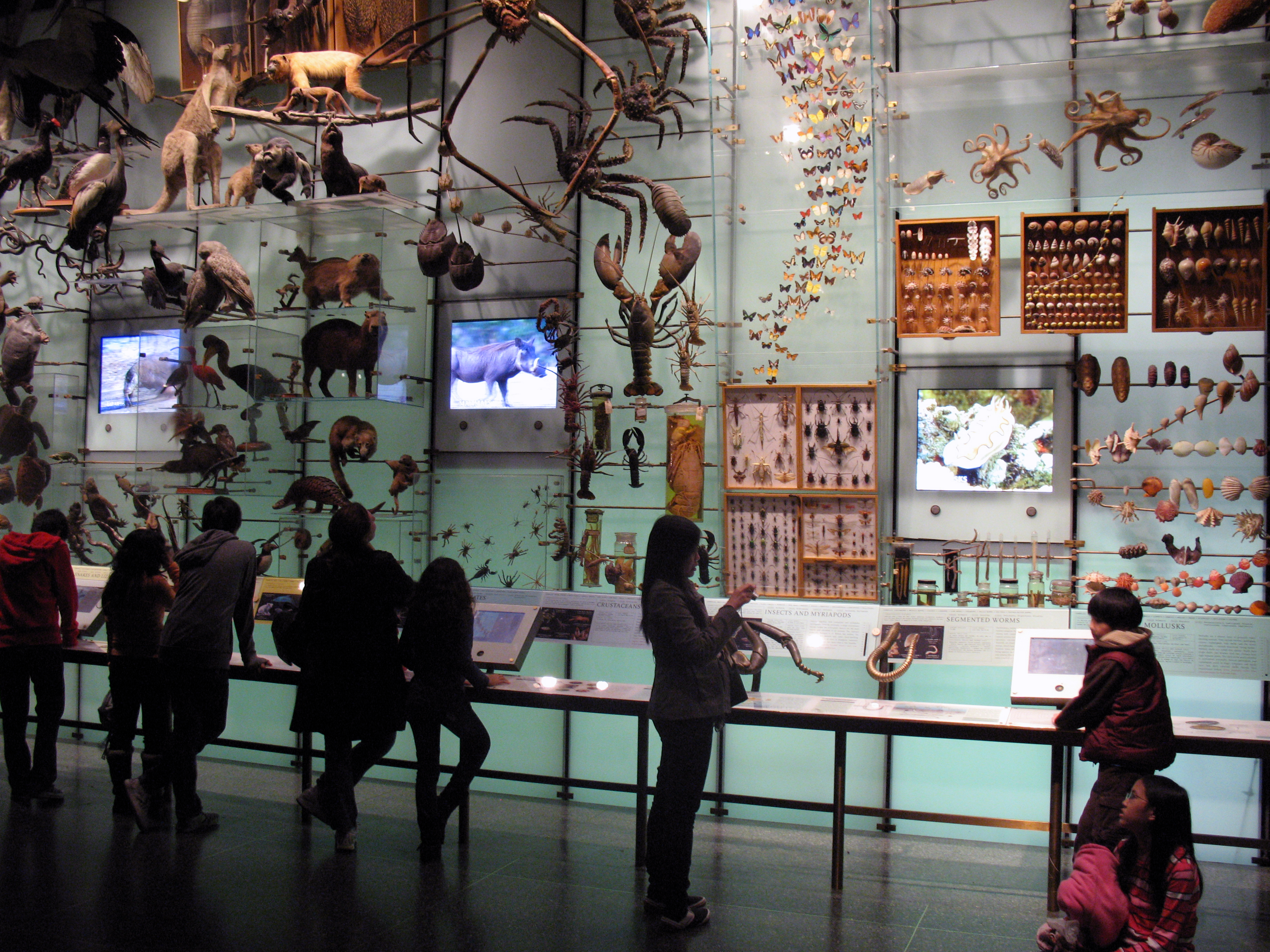
The "wall of life" is a three-dimensional cladogram consisting of over five hundred life-sized models.

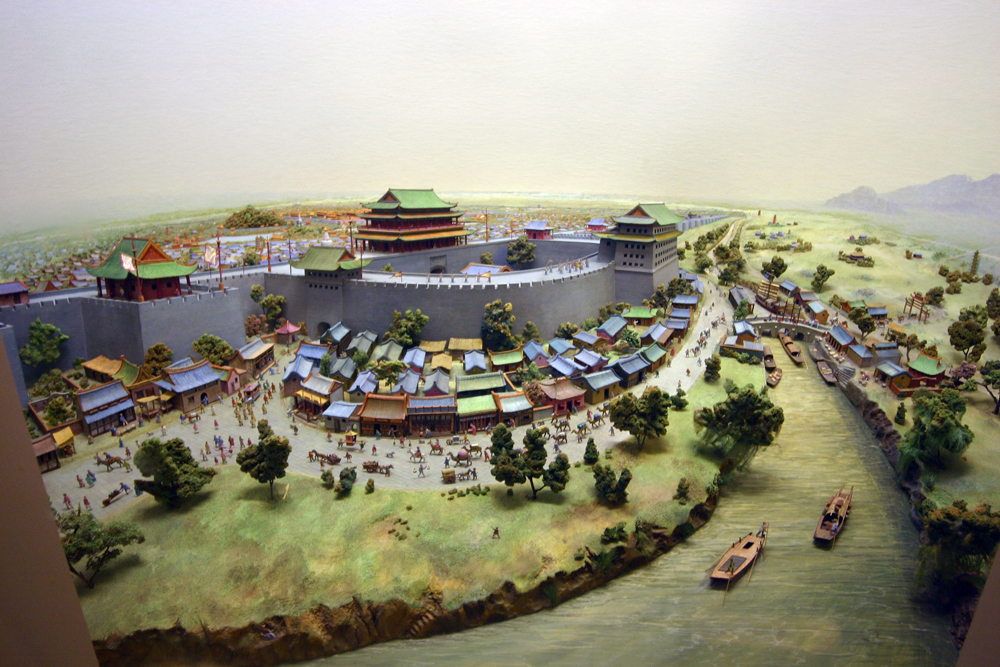
A forced perspective diorama in the Hall of Asian Peoples made by George F. Campbell M.R.I.N.A.

The AMNH Exhibitions Lab or AMNH Department of Exhibition is an interdisciplinary art and research team at the American Museum of Natural History that designs and produces museum installations, computer programs and film. Founded in 1869, the lab has since produced thousands of installations, many of which have become celebrated works. The department is notable for its integration of new scientific research into immersive art and multimedia presentations.

The exhibitions team currently consists of over sixty artists, writers, preparators, designers and programmers. The department is responsible for the creation of two to three exhibits per year, making the AMNH one of the most extensive exhibition creators in the world. These extensive shows typically travel nationally to sister natural history museums. Due to the strong relationship between the lab and the museum's extensive research and curation wing, the department has been among the first to introduce brand new topics to the public. They have produced, among others, the first exhibits to discuss Darwinian evolution, human-induced climate change and the Mesozoic mass extinction via asteroid.

== Dioramas ==
The AMNH dioramas have themselves become major historic attractions, and possibly the best known works of the exhibitions lab. Notable among them is the Akeley Hall of African Mammals which opened in 1936, at a time before widespread color photography. The hall showcases the vanishing wildlife of Africa in spaces where the human presence is notably absent, and includes hyperrealistic depictions of elephants, hippopotamuses, lions, gorillas, zebras, and various species of antelope, including the rarely seen aquatic sitatunga. Some of the displays are up to 18 feet (5 m) in height and 23 feet (7 m) in depth.

With the 1942 opening of the Hall of North American Mammals, diorama art reached a pinnacle. It took more than a decade to create the scenes depicted in the hall which includes a 432 square foot (40 m²) diorama of the American bison. The department recently redesigned the hall in order to revitalize the artistic influences of the present.

Today, although the art of diorama has ceased to be a major exhibition technique, dramatic examples of this art form are still occasionally employed. In 1997 museum artists and scientists traveled to the Central African Republic to collect samples and photographs for the construction of a 3,000 square foot (300 m^{2}) recreation of a tropical West African rainforest, the Dzanga-Sangha rain forest diorama in the Hall of Biodiversity.

Other notable dioramas, some dating back to the 1930s have been restored in the Milstein Hall of Ocean Life. The hall is a 29,000 square foot (2,700 m²) bi-level room that includes a delicately mounted 94 foot (29 m) long model of a Blue Whale swimming beneath and around video projection screens and interactive computer stations. Among the hall's notable dioramas is the "sperm whale and giant squid", which represents a true melding of art and science since an actual encounter between these two giant creatures at over one half mile depth has never been witnessed. Another celebrated diorama in the hall represents the "Andros coral reef" in the Bahamas, a two-story-high diorama that features the land form of the Bahamas and the many inhabitants of the coral reef found beneath the water's surface.

== Notable shows ==
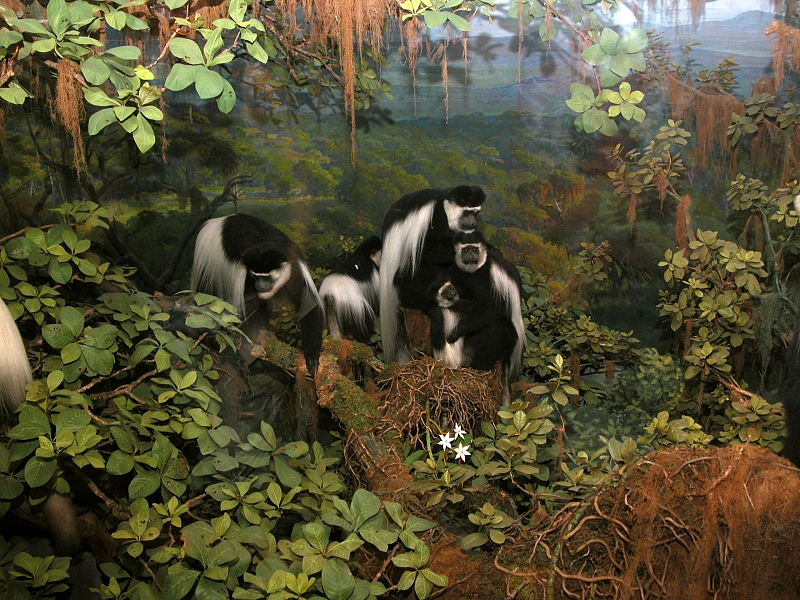
The 2003 mammal revitalization project reconstructed the colobus monkey diorama.

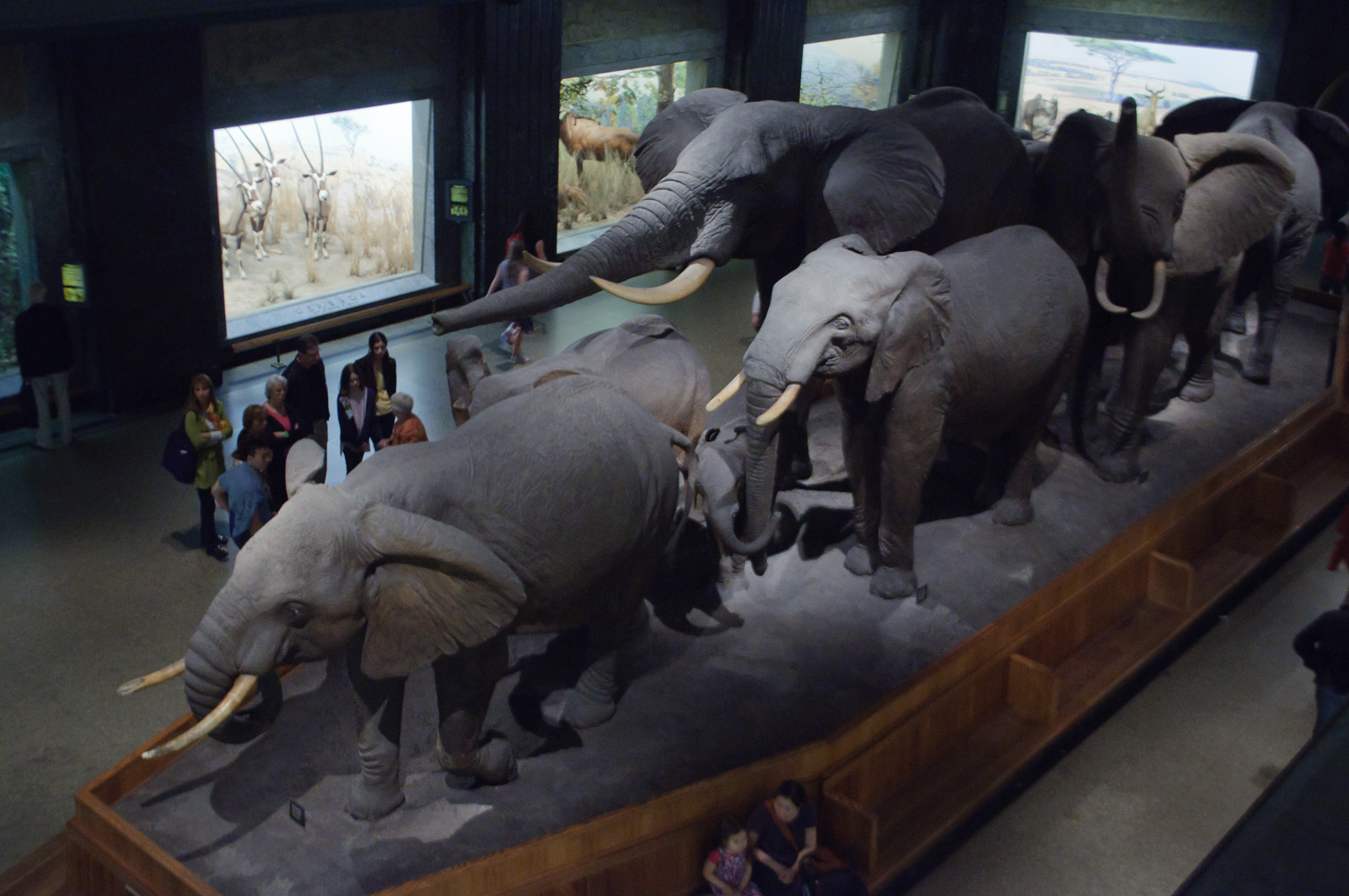
The Akeley Hall of African Mammals showcases the museum's famed taxidermy.

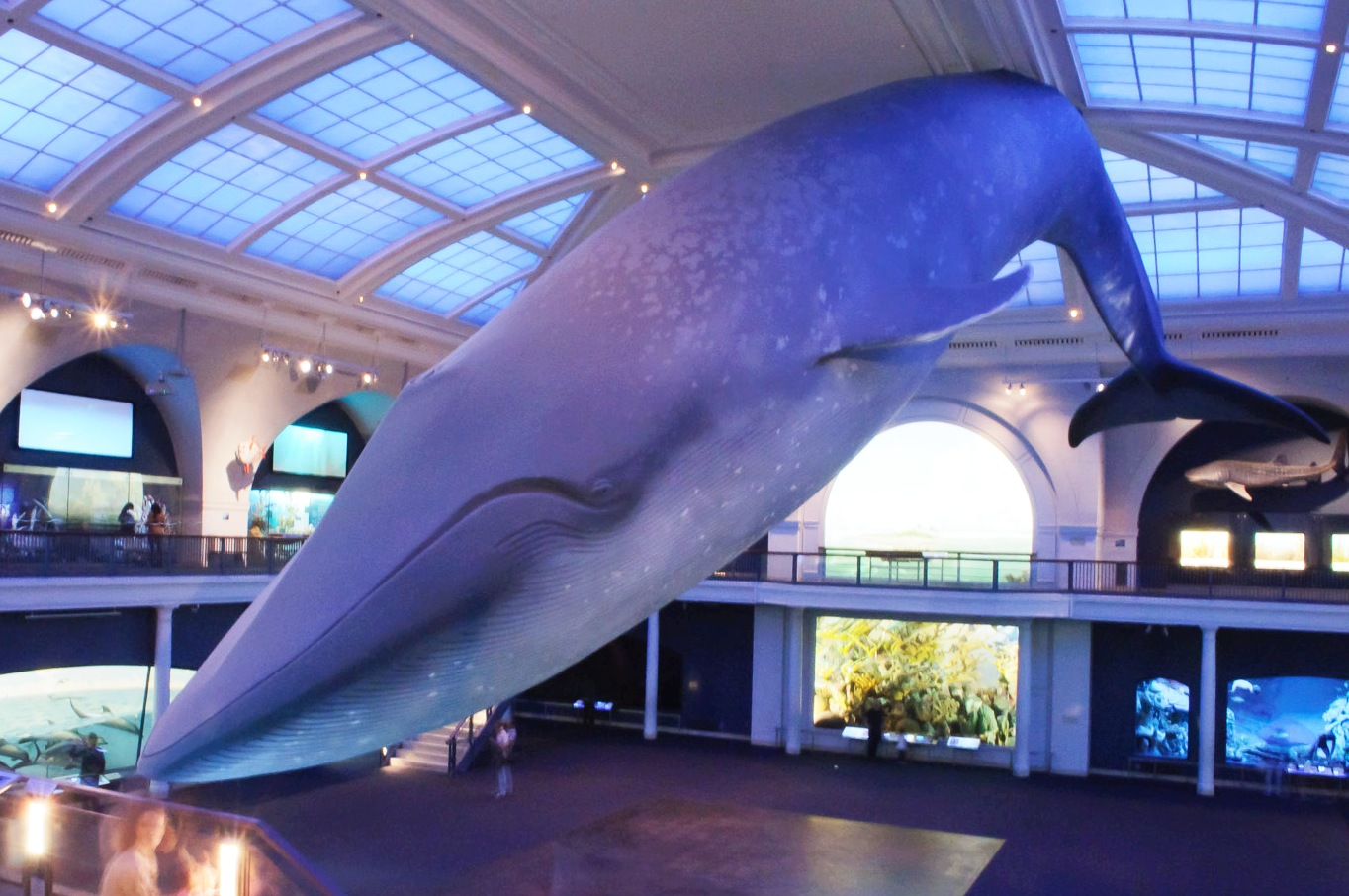
The museum's iconic blue whale was completed by the lab in 2003.

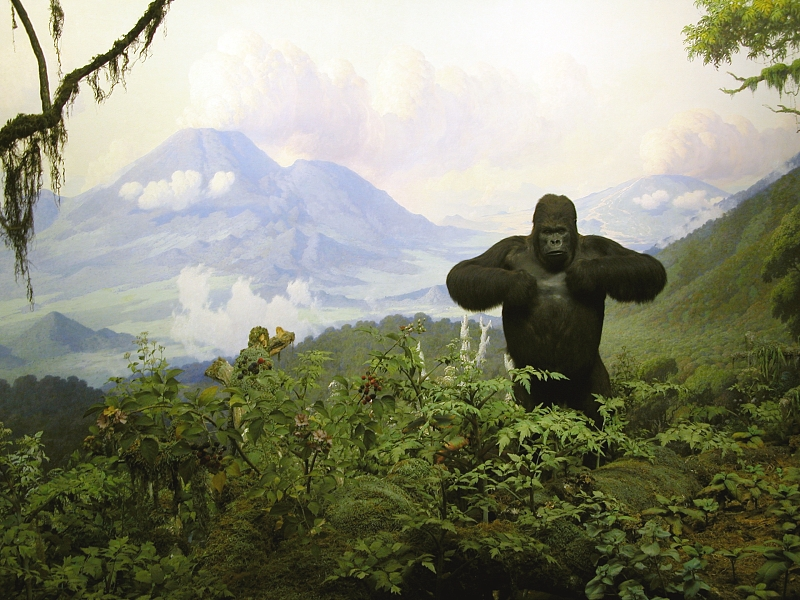
Akeley's Mountain Gorilla Diorama is especially lauded for its realism.

The following is a partial list of the shows produced by the department.

- 2013 – "The Power of Poison"
- 2012 – "The Global Kitchen", "Creatures of Light: Nature's Bioluminescence"
- 2011 – "Beyond Planet Earth: The Future of Space Travel", "The World's Largest Dinosaurs"
- 2010 – "Brain: The Inside Story", "Extreme Mammals", "Race to the End of the Earth"
- 2009 – "Traveling the Silk Road", "Horse"
- 2008 – "Climate Change: The Threat to Life and a New Energy Future", "Mythic Creatures"
- 2007 – "Water: H_{2}O = Life", "Lizards and Snakes: Alive!"
- 2006 – "Anne and Bernard Spitzer Hall of Human Origins" (Redesign)
- 2005 – "Darwin", "Dinosaurs: Ancient Fossils, New Discoveries"
- 2004 – "Totems to Turquoise", "Petra", "Exploratorium/AMNH" (designed with Exploratorium, San Francisco)
- 2003 – "Chocolate" (designed with the Field Museum, Chicago), "Vietnam: Journeys of Body, Mind and Spirit", "The First Europeans: Treasures from the Hills of Atapuerca", "Milstein Hall of Ocean Life" (Redesign)
- 2002 – "Baseball as America", "Einstein"
- 2001 – "Pearls", "Meeting God: Elements of Hindu Devotion", "The Genomic Revolution"
- 2000 – "Fighting Dinosaurs: Ancient Fossils, New Discoveries", "Vikings: The North Atlantic"
- 1999 – "Epidemic: The World of Infectious Disease", "The Endurance: Shackleton's Legendary Antarctic Expedition"
