= Akeley =

Akeley may refer to:

== Places ==
United Kingdom

- Akeley, Buckinghamshire
- Akeley, Leicestershire - a hundred (country subdivision) and a group of rural deaneries

United States

- Akeley, Minnesota
- Akeley Township, Hubbard County, Minnesota

== Plants ==
- Aquilegia canadensis, a regional common name from Quebec for the plant more often known as Canadian columbine

== Other uses ==
- Akeley (surname)
