= David Bruce (naturalist) =

David Bruce (13 June 1833 – 24 September 1903) was a Scottish-American natural history collector, taxidermist, and insect illustrator. He collaborated with Herman Strecker and William Henry Edwards.

Bruce was born in Perth, Scotland and grew up in Norwich. He became interested in natural history from an early age but in 1861 he met William C. Hewitson who encouraged him to develop his skills in illustrating insects. He then moved to New Zealand where his brother lived and worked briefly as an artist. He married Rachel Marshall in 1871 and they travelled to Paris during the Siege of Paris (1870–1871). The family moved to the USA around 1880 and set up a home in Brockport, New York. He was involved in interior decoration and produced paintings and frescoes around the New York area for a living. He also arranged taxidermy exhibits for many of his clients. While setting up specimens for E. Kirke Hart, he also trained Carl Akeley briefly. Bruce made collecting trips around the United States, especially during summers in the Colorado region. In 1885 his son died and his wife was injured. In 1892, Colorado State deputed him to produce an exhibit of butterflies and moths for the Chicago World Fair. In 1893 part of his collection was sold to the University of Wisconsin. He died suddenly while visiting a friend. He was buried in Lake View Cemetery, Brockport.
