= Tappan, Ohio =

- Unincorporated community
- Location within Ohio Location within the United States
- Coordinates: 40°21′26″N 81°12′27″W
- Country: United States
- State: Ohio
- County: Harrison
- Elevation: 988 ft (301 m)
- Time zone: UTC-5 (Eastern (EST))
  - Summer (DST): UTC-4 (EDT)
- Area codes: 740 & 220
- GNIS feature ID: 1063051

Tappan (also Franklin) is an unincorporated community in Harrison County, Ohio, United States.

== Notable person ==
Mary Jobe Akeley, explorer, writer, and photographer
