= The Power of Poison =

Science exhibit

The Power of Poison is an immersive science exhibit designed by the American Museum of Natural History in New York City. The exhibit explores poison’s roles in nature, health, history, literature, and myth. The show attempts to unify various studies prevalent with the museum's research facilities in order to illustrate the fluidity between the fields. It was designed by the AMNH Exhibitions Lab.

== Locations ==
- New York City: American Museum of Natural History, 16 November 2013 - 10 August 2014
- Atlanta, Georgia: Fernbank Museum of Natural History, 7 February 2015 - 3 May 2015

== Layout ==
The exhibit has four major sections, each highlighting poison as viewed by a different branch of science.

Biology

- Poison Alive

The exhibit opens with three small live animals, showing poison as a universal characteristic of the biosphere.

- The Chocó Rainforest

Ascending a small platform, visitors enter a lengthy walkthrough diorama of Colombia’s dense Chocó lowland forest. As visitors walk through the rainforest, they encounter specimens that utilize poison in their daily lives. The purpose of the section is to examine poison in a context of multiple evolutionary strategies—including linked variations in the strength of a predator’s poison and the resistance of its prey.

Anthropology

- Myths and Legends

Exiting the forest, visitors find themselves in a fairytale-like series of dioramas depicting poison in mythology. These include Grimm's Folktales, Alice in Wonderland and Macbeth. Curated by the museum's social sciences departments, a selection of prominent historical artifacts are incorporated into the dioramas, revealing ways humans have imagined the presence of poisons. These, in the words of the designers, are meant to show "the potent power of poison as a longstanding motif in fairy tales, legends, and children’s stories."

- Poison in History

A winding gallery takes visitors past life-sized models of some of history's most famous poisonings, such as Mozart's supposed death, Cleopatra’s snakebite and Napoleon’s poisoning by arsenic.

Forensics

- Dissecting Poison Theater

The "Dissecting Poison Theater" is a live show that describes how forensic anthropologists can detect poison. Visitors explore a real-world poisoning case that highlights advances in toxicology and forensics since the 19th century. This section is tied in with an iPad game, where visitors can solve their own forensic mystery.

Health Sciences

- Poison by Accident

This section uses three large forced perspective dioramas to tell stories about poison's dangerous and mercurial nature.

- Poison as Cure

The exhibit's finale takes guests through a diorama illustrating natural poisons that can ameliorate cancer, quinsy, laryngitis, croup, and other global health problems.
