= Anna Akeley =

Austrian-American physicist

- Born: Anna Mandler; May 5, 1904; Vienna, Austria
- Died: June 26, 2004 (aged 100); West Lafayette, Indiana, U.S.
- Other name: Anna Frost
- Occupations: Physics lecturer, radiologist
- Relatives: Lewis Akeley (father-in-law)

Anna Mandler Frost Akeley (May 5, 1904 – June 26, 2004) was an Austrian-born American physics lecturer and radiologist. She taught at Purdue University from 1942 to 1971.

== Early life and education ==
Mandler was born in Vienna, the daughter of Paul Mandler and Emma Löw-Beer. Her family was Jewish, but not religious. Anna was baptized and she attended a Catholic school. Her mother was a pianist, and her father was a businessman. She studied religion in college for about a year, and earned a diploma in radiology at the Roentgen Institute, then began working as an editor and translator at a publishing house.

== Career ==
Despite having no formal credentials, Akeley began teaching physics at Purdue University in 1942, after she fled wartime Europe for Indiana to be with her American husband. She recalled being ill-prepared to teach the subject in English, but studied with her husband to improve her subject matter and language skills. One of her first students was Nobel Prize winner Ben Roy Mottelson. In 1966 she received the Best Instructor Award in Purdue's College of Science. In 1969 she received the Helen B. Schleman Gold Medallion Award, given to the female faculty member who made extraordinary contributions to women's education at Purdue. She retired with emeritus status in 1971.

In 1995, Akeley donated the couple's extensive art collection, with works by Diego Rivera, Leonora Carrington, Käthe Kollwitz, Guillermo Meza, Rufino Tamayo, and others, to small museums, including the Smart Museum of Art at the University of Chicago, the University of South Dakota, the Purdue Galleries, and the Art Museum of Greater Lafayette. She also donated an Oxford English Dictionary to the Purdue library system, as the system's two-millionth volume.

== Personal life ==
Mandler married twice. Her first husband was named Frost. In 1942, she married American physicist Edward Stowe Akeley, the ex-husband of cryptanalyst Evelyn Niemann Akeley, and the son of Lewis Akeley. Her husband died in 1984, and she died in 2004, at the age of 100, in West Lafayette. Her papers are in the Purdue University archives.
