= Deersville Historic District =

Historic district in Ohio, United States

- U.S. National Register of Historic Places
- U.S. Historic district
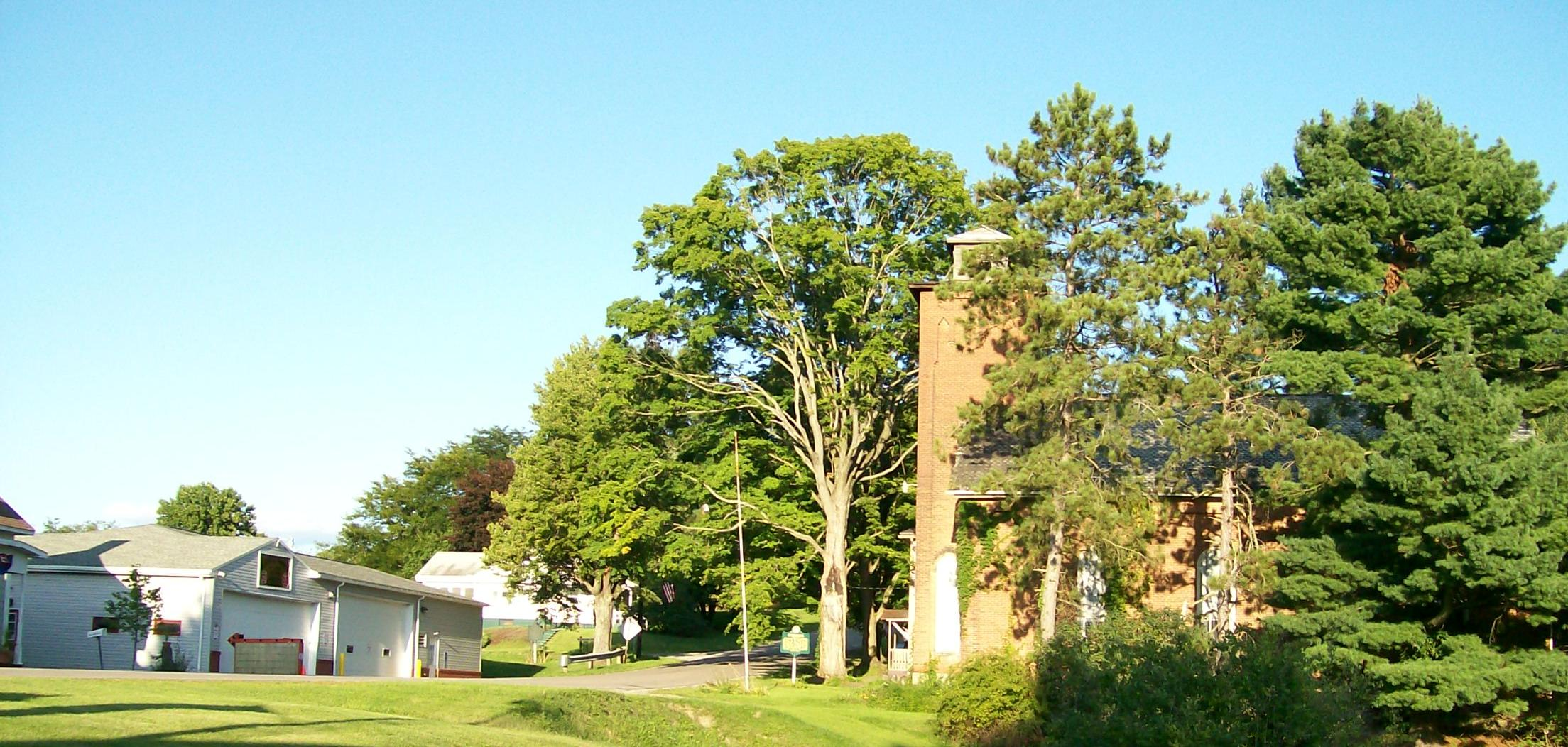
- The historic district of Deersville, Ohio

- Location within Ohio Location within the United States
- Location: Roughly along W. Main St. from 230 W. Main St. to 212 Wl. Main St., Deersville, Ohio
- Coordinates: 40°18′28″N 81°11′24″W
- Area: 17 acres (6.9 ha)
- Architect: Various
- Architectural style: Greek Revival, Gothic Revival
- NRHP reference No.: 04001199
- Added to NRHP: October 27, 2004

The Deersville Historic District is located along Main Street in Deersville, Ohio. The buildings in the district include several houses, a community hall, a general store, two inns, a church, and an antique store, many of which are closed. The district was added to the National Register on October 27, 2004.
