= Deersville, Ohio =

- Village
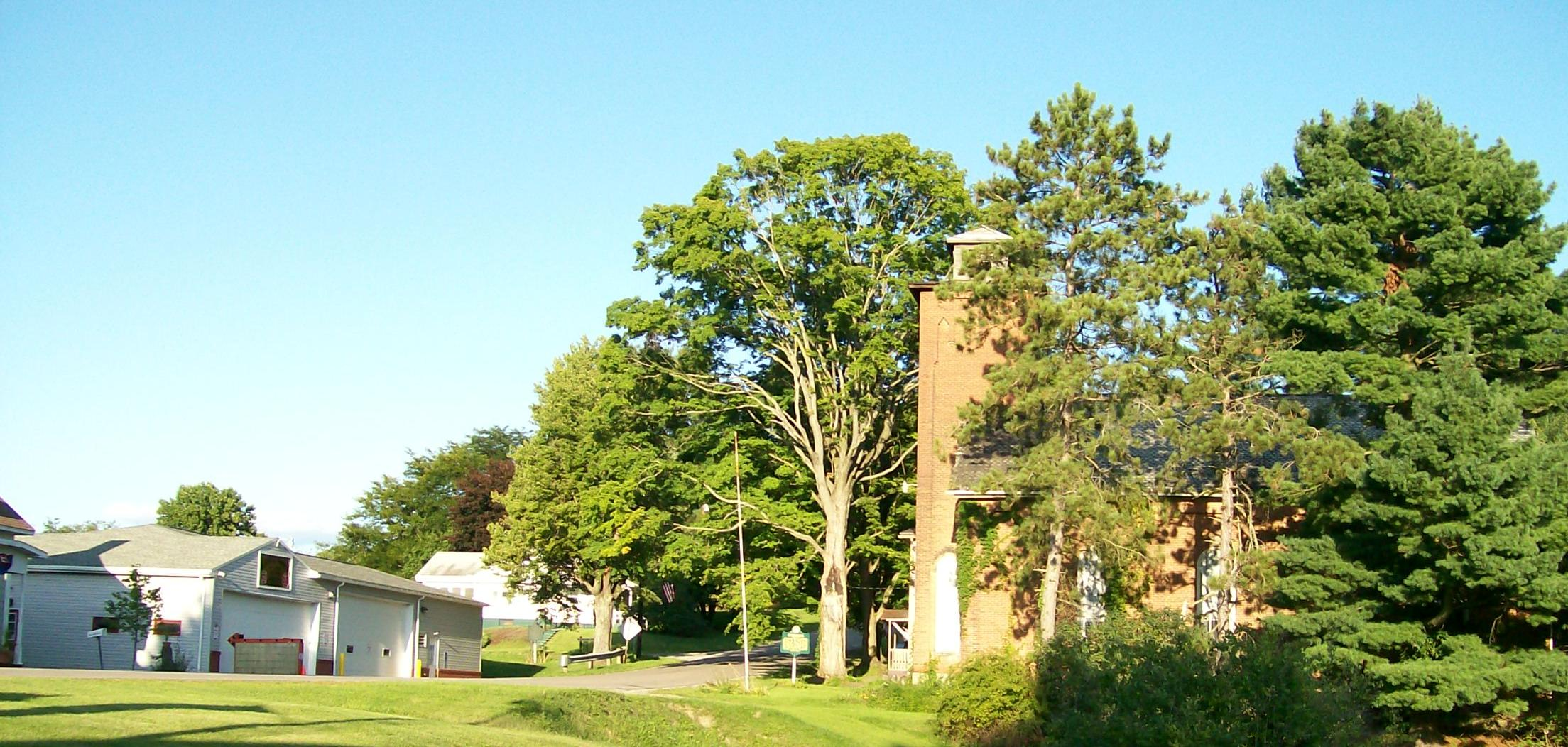
- Deersville Historic District

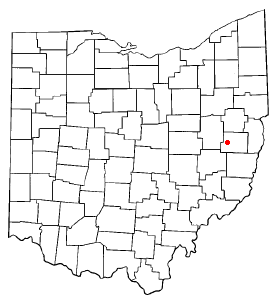
- Location of Deersville, Ohio

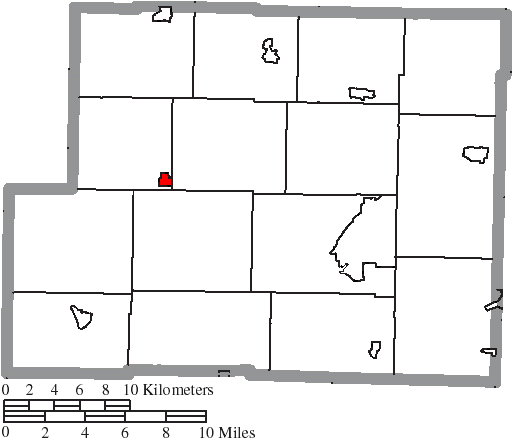
- Location of Deersville in Harrison County
- Coordinates: 40°18′30″N 81°11′17″W
- Country: United States
- State: Ohio
- County: Harrison
- Township: Franklin
- Platted: 1815

Area
  - Total: 0.34 sq mi (0.89 km^{2})
  - Land: 0.34 sq mi (0.89 km^{2})
  - Water: 0 sq mi (0.00 km^{2})
- Elevation: 1,198 ft (365 m)

Population (2020)
  - Total: 69
  - Estimate (2023): 65
  - Density: 200.3/sq mi (77.32/km^{2})
- Time zone: UTC-5 (Eastern (EST))
  - Summer (DST): UTC-4 (EDT)
- ZIP code: 44693
- Area code: 740
- FIPS code: 39-21294
- GNIS feature ID: 2398708

Deersville is a village in Franklin Township, Harrison County, Ohio, United States. The population was 69 at the 2020 census. The Deersville Historic District is located along Main Street.

== History ==
Deersville was platted in 1815. A post office called Deersville has been in operation since 1828.

== Geography ==
According to the United States Census Bureau, the village has a total area of 0.35 square miles (0.91 km^{2}), all land.

== Demographics ==
Historical population
| Census | Pop. | Note | %± |
|---|---|---|---|
| 1850 | 289 | | — |
| 1860 | 267 | | −7.6% |
| 1870 | 306 | | 14.6% |
| 1880 | 382 | | 24.8% |
| 1900 | 256 | | — |
| 1910 | 187 | | −27.0% |
| 1920 | 115 | | −38.5% |
| 1930 | 108 | | −6.1% |
| 1940 | 118 | | 9.3% |
| 1950 | 149 | | 26.3% |
| 1960 | 136 | | −8.7% |
| 1970 | 91 | | −33.1% |
| 1980 | 109 | | 19.8% |
| 1990 | 86 | | −21.1% |
| 2000 | 82 | | −4.7% |
| 2010 | 79 | | −3.7% |
| 2020 | 69 | | −12.7% |
| 2023 (est.) | 65 | ▼ | −5.8% |
U.S. Decennial Census

=== 2010 census ===
As of the census of 2010, there were 79 people, 33 households, and 24 families living in the village. The population density was 225.7 inhabitants per square mile (87.1/km^{2}). There were 59 housing units at an average density of 168.6 per square mile (65.1/km^{2}). The racial makeup of the village was 94.9% White, 2.5% Asian, and 2.5% from two or more races.

There were 33 households, of which 24.2% had children under the age of 18 living with them, 57.6% were married couples living together, 12.1% had a female householder with no husband present, 3.0% had a male householder with no wife present, and 27.3% were non-families. 27.3% of all households were made up of individuals, and 12.2% had someone living alone who was 65 years of age or older. The average household size was 2.39 and the average family size was 2.83.

The median age in the village was 45.5 years. 16.5% of residents were under the age of 18; 11.3% were between the ages of 18 and 24; 20.2% were from 25 to 44; 34.2% were from 45 to 64; and 17.7% were 65 years of age or older. The gender makeup of the village was 51.9% male and 48.1% female.

=== 2000 census ===
As of the census of 2000, there were 82 people, 39 households, and 24 families living in the village. The population density was 235.0 inhabitants per square mile (90.7/km^{2}). There were 57 housing units at an average density of 163.3 per square mile (63.1/km^{2}). The racial makeup of the village was 100.00% White. Hispanic or Latino of any race were 1.22% of the population.

There were 39 households, out of which 23.1% had children under the age of 18 living with them, 53.8% were married couples living together, 10.3% had a female householder with no husband present, and 35.9% were non-families. 28.2% of all households were made up of individuals, and 12.8% had someone living alone who was 65 years of age or older. The average household size was 2.10 and the average family size was 2.56.

In the village, the population was spread out, with 18.3% under the age of 18, 3.7% from 18 to 24, 24.4% from 25 to 44, 35.4% from 45 to 64, and 18.3% who were 65 years of age or older. The median age was 46 years. For every 100 females there were 110.3 males. For every 100 females age 18 and over, there were 91.4 males.

The median income for a household in the village was $23,750, and the median income for a family was $22,188. Males had a median income of $38,750 versus $16,875 for females. The per capita income for the village was $15,224. There were 10.0% of families and 14.4% of the population living below the poverty line, including 22.2% of under eighteens and none of those over 64.

== Notable people ==
- Mary Jobe Akeley, author, conservationist, explorer, photographer
- Harry Hazlett, army officer and football coach
- John Calhoun Johnson, California assemblyman
