= Evelyn Niemann Akeley =

American mathematician

- Evelyn Niemann (later Akeley), from the 1928 yearbook of Smith College
- Born: Evelyn Clara Niemann; August 24, 1907; New York, New York, U.S.
- Died: March 23, 1998 (aged 90); Sarasota, Florida, U.S.
- Occupations: Mathematician, college professor, cryptanalyst
- Relatives: Lewis Akeley (father-in-law)

Evelyn Clara Niemann Akeley (August 24, 1907 – March 23, 1998) was an American mathematician and cryptanalyst. She taught at Skidmore College, and worked for American intelligence agencies during and after World War II. In 2023 she was inducted into the National Security Agency's Cryptologic Hall of Honor.

== Early life and education ==
Niemann was born in New York City and raised in Saratoga Springs, New York, the daughter of Albert Henry Niemann and Julia Dahin Niemann. Her father was a salesman. She was captain of the soccer team at Smith College, and graduated from Smith in 1928. She earned a master's degree in mathematics from Columbia University in 1931.

== Career ==
Akeley taught math and physics and directed the vocational bureau at Skidmore College until 1942, when she was recuited to train codebreakers in the Washington, D.C. area, during World War II. She was director of training at the Signal Intelligence Service and a researcher in cryptanalysis; her students, including Ann Z. Caracristi, were credited with breaking many Japanese Army codes important to the war effort. She retired from the National Security Agency in 1958.

In retirement, she was a violist with the Florida West Coast Symphony, and a volunteer with the American Red Cross. She was also a competitive amateur golfer.

== Personal life ==
Niemann married fellow academic Edward Stowe Akeley, son of Lewis Akeley, in 1935. They divorced before 1942, when he remarried, to Austrian physics lecturer Anna Akeley. Evelyn Niemann Akeley died in 1998, at age 90, in Sarasota, Florida. She was inducted into the National Security Agency's Cryptologic Hall of Honor in 2023.
