= Anne and Bernard Spitzer Hall of Human Origins =

Exhibit at the American Museum of Natural History

The Anne and Bernard Spitzer Hall of Human Origins is an exhibit at the American Museum of Natural History in New York City. It focuses on human evolution, paleoanthropology, archaeology and genetics. At the time of its opening in 1921, it was the first museum exhibit to discuss the controversial topic of evolution. Among its many highlights include the Dordogne cave paintings and the skeleton of Lucy.

== Mission ==
As stated upon its 2007 reopening, the mission of the hall is to "combine discoveries in the fossil record with the latest genomic science to explore the most profound mysteries of humankind: who we are, where we came from, and what is in store for the future of our species. We will explore human biology and anatomy, trace the path of human evolution, and examine the origins of human creativity."

== Exhibits ==
The hall starts with the present Homo sapiens and traces its evolution backwards through time, while examining anthropology including music, art and technology. As the visitor winds through the hall, significant stops are made by life sized dioramas of Australopithecus afarensis, Homo ergaster, Neanderthal, and Cro-Magnon in an attempt to demonstrate the behaviors and capabilities of human predecessors. By the dioramas are actual archeological finds that showcase the evolution of creativity and brain development. Also displayed are full-sized casts of important fossils, including the 3.2-million-year-old Lucy skeleton and the 1.7-million-year-old Turkana Boy, and Homo erectus specimens including a cast of Peking Man.

== In popular culture ==
In the 1999 film Election, Matthew Broderick's character compares his humiliating story to the apelike model of Homo ergaster.
