= Carl Akeley =

American taxidermist (1864–1926)

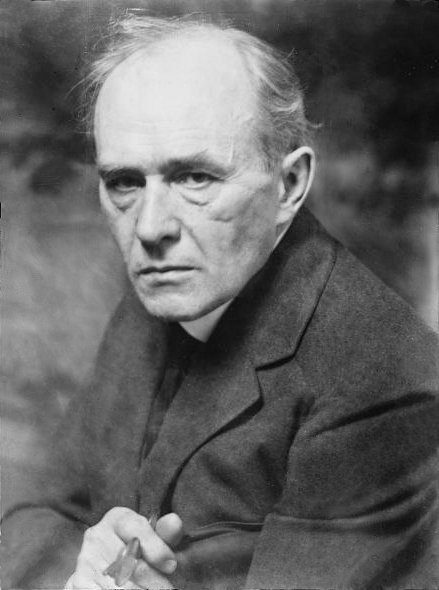
- Born: May 19, 1864; Clarendon, New York, US
- Died: November 17, 1926 (aged 62); Mt. Mikeno, Belgian Congo
- Spouses: Delia Akeley (m. 1902; div. 1923) Mary Jobe Akeley (m. 1924)
- Relatives: Lewis Akeley (brother)
- Awards: John Scott Medal (1916)
- Scientific career
- Fields: Taxidermy
- Workplaces: Milwaukee Public Museum, Field Museum of Natural History, American Museum of Natural History, the Smithsonian Institution

Carl Ethan Akeley (May 19, 1864 – November 17, 1926) was a pioneering American taxidermist, sculptor, biologist, conservationist, inventor, and nature photographer, noted for his contributions to American museums, most notably to the Milwaukee Public Museum, Field Museum of Natural History and the American Museum of Natural History. He is considered by some to be the father of modern taxidermy. He was the founder of the AMNH Exhibitions Lab, an interdisciplinary department that fuses scientific research with immersive design.

== Career ==
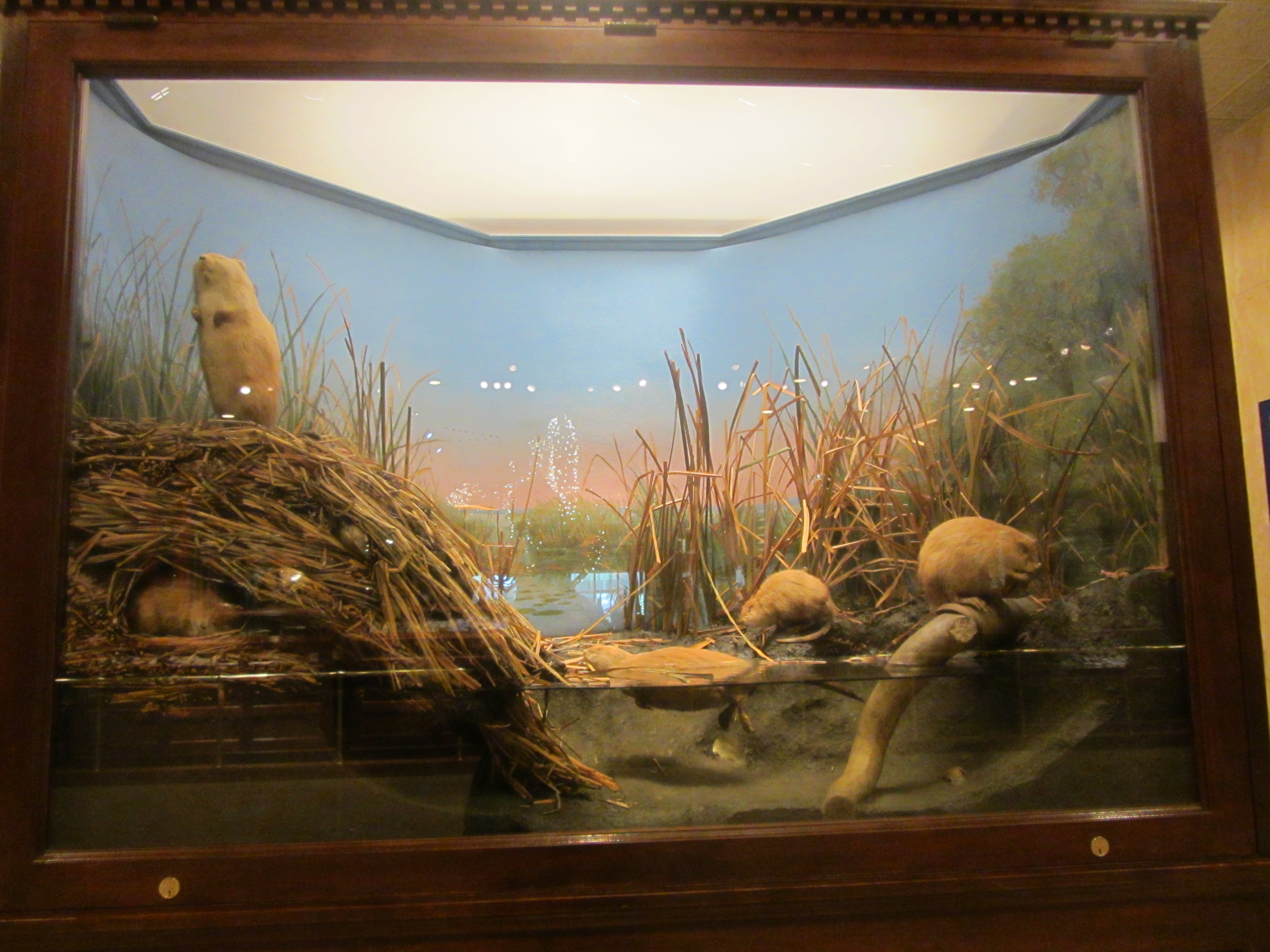
"Muskrat Group", one of Akeley's early works for the Milwaukee Public Museum

Akeley was born to Daniel Webster Akeley and Julia Glidden in Clarendon, New York, and grew up on a farm, attending school for only three years. He learned taxidermy from David Bruce in Brockport, New York, and then entered an apprenticeship in taxidermy at Ward's Natural Science Establishment in Rochester, New York. While at Ward's Akeley also helped mount P. T. Barnum's Jumbo after he was killed in a railroad accident.

In 1886 Akeley moved on to the Milwaukee Public Museum (MPM) in Milwaukee, Wisconsin. Akeley remained in Milwaukee for six years, refining "model" techniques used in taxidermy. At the Milwaukee Public Museum, his early work consisted of animals found in Wisconsin prairies and woodlands. One of these was a diorama of a muskrat group, which is sometimes referred to as the first museum diorama; however, such dioramas, and dioramas depicting "habitat groups," dated back well into the early 1800s, and were quite popular with taxidermists in Victorian England. He also created historical reindeer and orangutan exhibits.

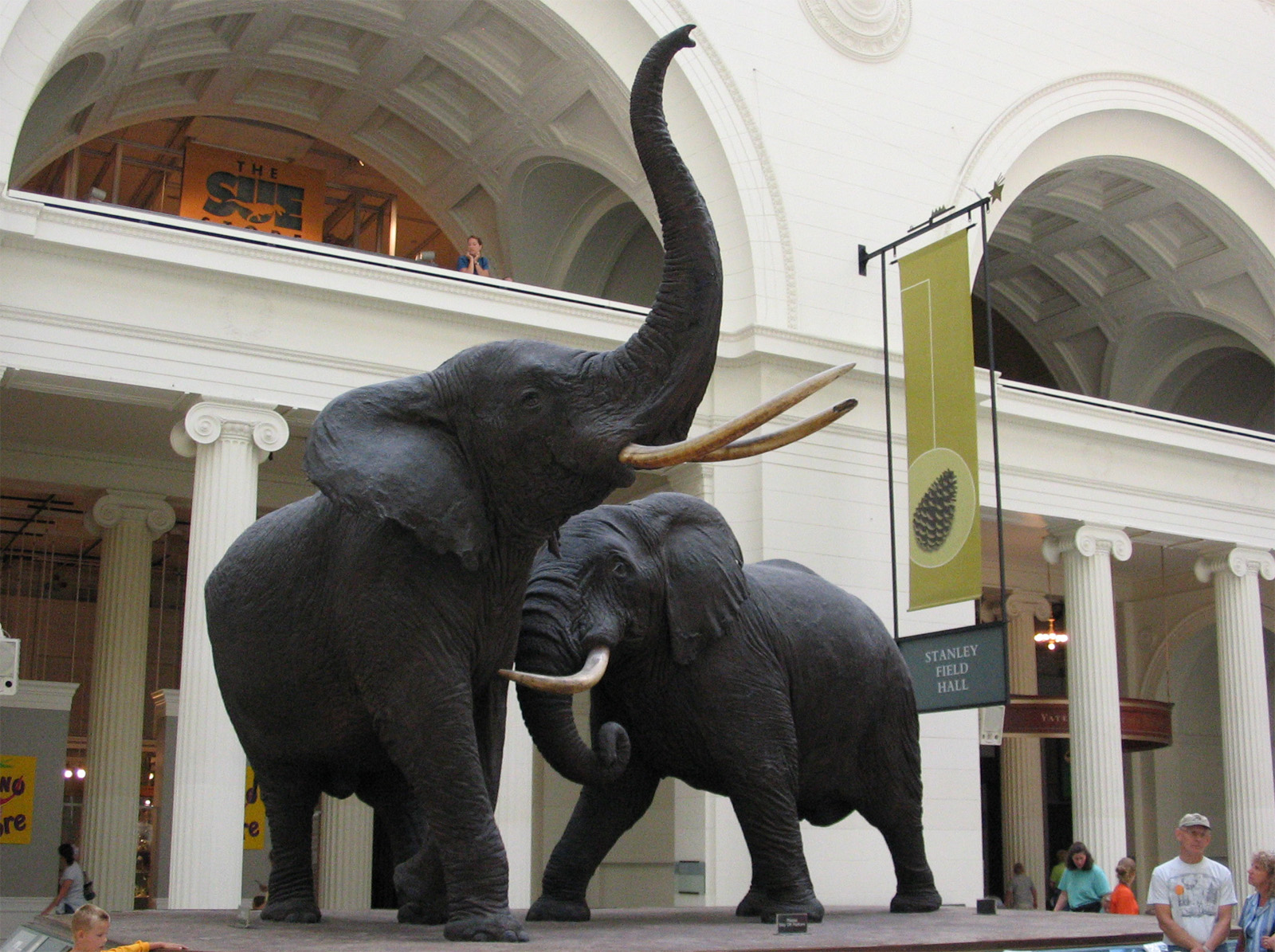
"Fighting African Elephants" on display in Stanley Field Hall, The Field Museum, Chicago

Akeley left the Milwaukee Public Museum in 1892 and set up a private studio from which he continued to do contract work, including three mustangs for the Smithsonian Institution for exhibition at the World's Columbian Exposition. In 1896, he joined the Field Museum of Natural History in Chicago, where he developed his innovative taxidermy techniques, notably the creation of lightweight, hollow, but sturdy mannequins on which to mount the animals' skins. His techniques, which involved sculpting the realistic musculature of the animals in active poses before mounting the skin, were also notable for their life-like representation. Akeley was the Field Museum's chief taxidermist from 1896-1909 and prepared more than 130 mounted specimens and dioramas. His most famous creations include the "Fighting African Elephants" in the central hall of the Field Museum, killed by Akeley and his wife Delia Akeley before being brought to Chicago for mounting and first put on display in 1909.

He was also a prolific inventor, perfecting a "cement gun" to repair the crumbling facade of the Field Columbian Museum in Chicago (the old Palace of Fine Arts from the World's Columbian Exposition. He is today known as the inventor of shotcrete, or "gunite" as he termed it at the time. Akeley did not use sprayable concrete in his taxidermy work, as is sometimes suggested. Akeley also invented the Akeley Camera, a highly mobile motion picture camera for capturing wildlife, started a company to manufacture it, and patented it in 1915. The Akeley "pancake" camera (so-called because it was round) was soon adopted by the War Department for use in World War I, primarily for aerial use, and later by newsreel companies, and Hollywood studios, primarily for aerial footage and action scenes. F. Trubee Davison covered these and other Akeley inventions in a special issue of Natural History magazine. Akeley also wrote several books, including stories for children, and an autobiography In Brightest Africa (1920). He was awarded more than 30 patents for his inventions.

Akeley specialized in African mammals, particularly the gorilla and the elephant. As a taxidermist, he improved on techniques of fitting the skin over a carefully prepared and sculpted form of the animal's body, producing very lifelike specimens, with consideration of musculature, wrinkles, and veins. He also displayed the specimens in groups in a natural setting. Many animals that he preserved he had personally collected.

== The Akeley Method ==
First and foremost, Akeley believed and was obsessively committed to the idea that taxidermy could produce mounted animals that look not just lifelike, but alive. Akeley was equally committed to presenting mounts in the context of their scientifically accurate environments and social interactions.

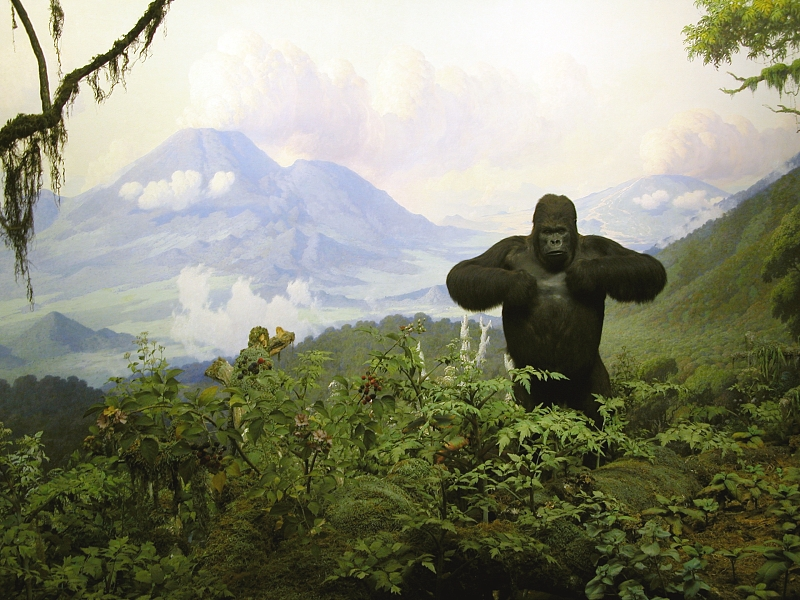
Gorilla diorama is one of Akeley's dioramas, which is on display in the American Museum of Natural History.

Akeley's techniques resulted in anatomically accurate, skinless manikins of an animal in lifelike actions and postures. The mannequin was extremely lightweight and hollow and made primarily of papier mache and wire mesh. Akeley based the mannequin on precise field measurements and photographs as well as his understanding of the animal's anatomy and behavior in its natural environment. After creating the mannequin, the hide and hooves were meticulously attached.

The steps to the Akeley Method:

1. Akeley first sculpted a detailed and precise 1/12th scale clay model of his ultimate mount
2. He then built an armature using: skeletal bones, wood, metal rods, wire, and wire mesh
3. Akeley then covered the armature with plaster and then clay, which he sculpted to produce an exact model of the living animal
4. He then coated the clay model with plaster. When dry, the plaster mold was removed from the clay in sections and resulted in a perfect mold of the sculpted model
5. Papier mache pulp and supportive mesh wire was applied to the inside of the plaster mold and when dried produced a full-scale hollow mannequin in the exact form of the original sculpture
6. The mannequin was clothed with the original pelt and sewn up so that not a seam is discernible

== African expeditions ==
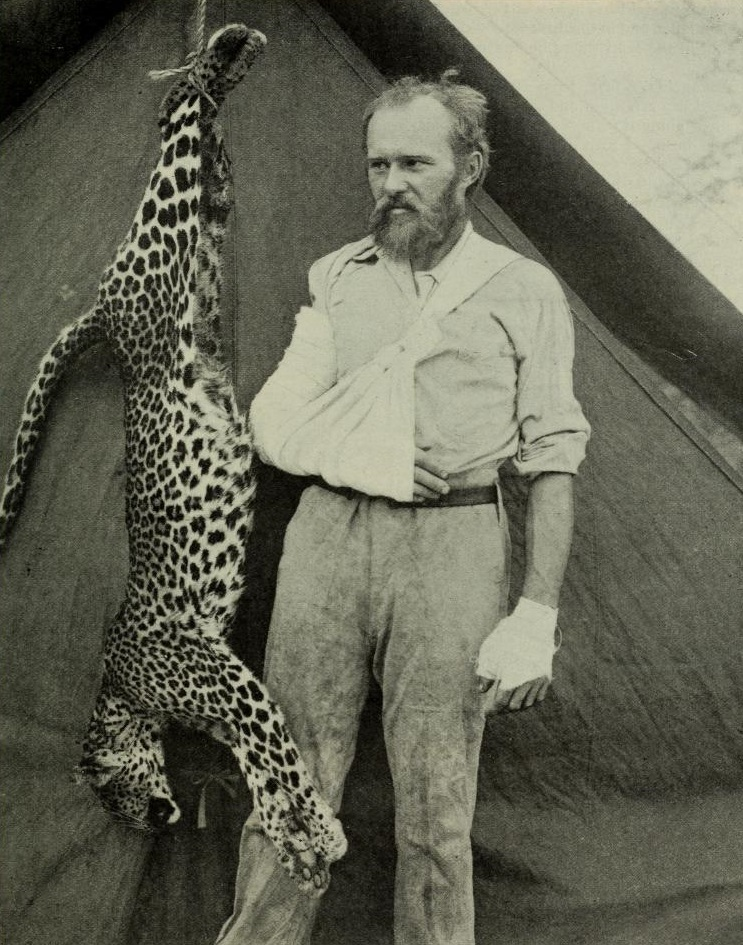
Carl Akeley and the leopard he killed barehanded.

Akeley first traveled to Africa in 1896 when he was invited by Daniel Elliot, Curator of the Zoology Department in the new Columbian Field Museum, on an eight month expedition to Somaliland. It was on this trip that Akeley came face to face with a deadly 80-pound leopard which he strangled with his bare hands, however the animal had previously been shot in one of its hind limbs which could have caused the attack to fail. Akeley collected hundreds of animal specimens including: hartebeest, gazelles, hyenas, kudus, oryx, and lions. The process of collecting specimens included: killing, measuring, photographing, skinning, de-boning, preserving, and packing them for shipment back to Chicago.

In 1905, Marshall Field funded Akeley’s next trip to Africa which lasted twelve months and brought back two bull elephants which he would later mount for display. Akeley took nearly 1,000 glass plate photos and collected 17 tons of material including: 400 mammal skins, 1200 small mammal skins, 800 bird skins, and a fair number of bird and mammal skeletons. In addition to zoologic material he also collected more than 900 anthropological specimens and crates of leaves that he would use as models for his dioramas.

In 1909, Akeley accompanied Theodore Roosevelt on a year-long expedition in Africa funded by the Smithsonian Institution and began working at the American Museum of Natural History in New York City, where his efforts can still be seen in the Akeley Hall of African Mammals. Akeley joined the Explorers Club in 1912, having been sponsored by three of the Club's seven Charter Members: Frank Chapman, Henry Collins Walsh, and Marshall Saville. For qualifying, Akeley wrote only, "Explorations in Somaliland and British East Africa." He became the Club's sixth president serving from 1917–1918.

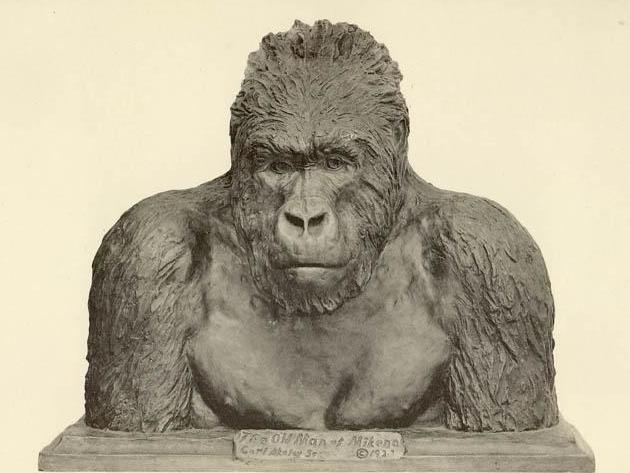
"The Old Man of Mikeno", bronze bust of a mountain gorilla by Carl Akeley

In 1921, eager to learn about gorillas, Akeley led an expedition to Mt. Mikeno in the Virunga Mountains at the edge of the then Belgian Congo. At that time, gorillas were quite exotic, with very few even in zoos, and collecting such animals for educational museum exhibitions was not uncommon. During the expedition, he became the first person to capture motion pictures of gorillas in their native environment. In the process of "collecting" (killing) several mountain gorillas, Akeley's attitude changed. He discovered that gorillas were not the aggressive creatures that had been described by game hunters and popular media, and he set about to correct the record.

The gorilla is a vegetarian, so he kills no animals for food, and he has not progressed sufficiently along the paths of man to enjoy killing as a sport. He lives in amity with the elephants, buffalo, and all the wild creatures of his neighbourhood.

For the remainder of his life, Akeley worked for the establishment of a gorilla preserve in the Virungas. His work inspired King Albert I of Belgium to establish the Albert National Park (since renamed Virunga National Park) in 1925. It was Africa's first national park. Opposed to hunting them for sport or trophies, Akeley remained an advocate of collection for scientific and educational purposes.

Akeley began his fifth journey to the Congo with the start of the dry season in late 1926. He died on November 17 of dysentery and was buried in Africa, just miles from where he encountered his first gorilla, the "Old Man of Mikeno".

== Personal life ==
His second wife, Mary Jobe Akeley, married him two years before he died. He had previously been married to Delia Akeley (1869–1970) for nearly 20 years. Delia Akeley accompanied him on two of his biggest and most productive safaris to Africa, in 1905 and again in 1909. Delia later returned to Africa twice under the auspices of the Brooklyn Museum of Arts and Sciences.

== Legacy ==
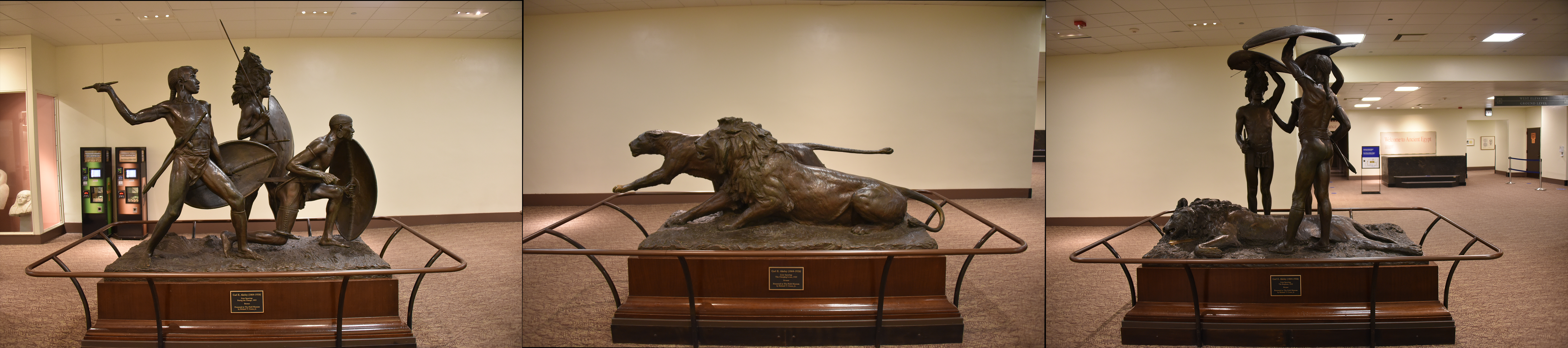
Lion Spearing in Africa (1926) Field Museum, Chicago; Bronze sculpture by Carl Akeley.

The World Taxidermy & Fish Carving Championships awards gold medallions that bear Carl Akeley's likeness—based on a photograph he had taken at Stein Photography in Milwaukee—to its "Best in World" winners. There is also a Carl Akeley Award for the most artistic mount at the World Show. The medallions were sculpted by Floyd Easterman of the Milwaukee Public Museum. The Akeley Hall of African Mammals of the American Museum of Natural History and the Akeley Memorial Hall at The Field Museum are named for him.
