= Lewis Akeley =

American academic (1881–1961)

- Born: February 22, 1861; Clarendon, New York
- Died: September 5, 1961 (aged 100); Vermillion, South Dakota
- Title: Dean of Engineering (1908–1933)
- Spouse: Myra Thomas (m. 1891)
- Relatives: Carl Akeley (brother); Anna Akeley (daughter-in-law); Evelyn Niemann Akeley (daughter-in-law)

Academic background
- Education: University of Rochester (BA, MA); University of Chicago; University of Leipzig

Academic work
- Discipline: Engineering
- Institutions: University of South Dakota
- Notable students: Ernest Lawrence

Lewis Ellsworth Akeley (February 22, 1861 – September 5, 1961) was an American academic. He served in various roles at the University of South Dakota (USD) between 1887 and his retirement in 1933, including as lecturer of various topics, including physics and chemistry; and Dean of Engineering for 25 years. He also served as a mentor to Ernest Lawrence, who would go on to earn the Nobel Prize in Physics.

Akeley died in 1961 at the age of 100, making him a centenarian. Akeley was posthumously inducted into the South Dakota Hall of Fame in 1978.

== Early life and education ==
Lewis Ellsworth Akeley was born on February 22, 1861, in Clarendon, New York. His brother, Carl, would become a conservationist. Akeley first attended classes in a one-room schoolhouse before moving at age 16 to a normal school in Brockport, New York. He studied at the University of Rochester, where he earned his Bachelor of Arts in 1886 and his MA degree in 1887, and also attended the University of Chicago.

== Career ==
Shortly after his graduation, he became a professor of physics and chemistry at the University of South Dakota (USD) in Vermillion. In 1890, Akeley travelled to the University of Leipzig and spent a year studying there under chemist Wilhelm Ostwald before returning to USD.

Akeley taught classes on a variety of other topics during his time at USD, including Latin and physiology. Akeley became Dean of the College of Engineering in 1908 and served in that capacity for 25 years. In 1918, Akeley directed the Student Army Training Camp, established by USD in response to World War I. Besides lecturing, Akeley also contributed to several publications, such as the Philosophic Review and the Journal of Engineering Education; and was involved with or served on the boards for several organizations, including the American Association for the Advancement of Science, the Council for Promotion of Engineering Education, and the Vermillion Chamber of Commerce. The University of Rochester awarded him an honorary Doctor of Laws degree in 1912, and USD granted him an honorary Doctor of Science degree.

In 1919, with Akeley's support, then-student Ernest Lawrence started KUSD (AM), one of the earliest educational radio stations in the United States, one of the first public broadcasting stations in South Dakota, and the forerunner to South Dakota Public Broadcasting. Akeley approved Lawrence's proposal for the university's first radio station and granted Lawrence $100 to set it up in the Science Hall. Akeley asked Lawrence, who was studying chemistry and medicine, to take physics courses. Akeley continued to mentor Lawrence until his graduation in 1922, once telling Lawrence's classmates, "Take a good look at him, for there will come a day when you will all be proud to have been in the same class with Ernest Lawrence." The two men remained close friends throughout their lives. Akeley visited the University of California, Berkeley in 1946 to view Lawrence's new cyclotron invention.

Akeley officially retired in 1933, although he continued to support the university and act as a lecturer. The same year, he was elected to the council of McGill University's Ecole Polytechnique in Montreal. President Dwight D. Eisenhower sent a letter to Akeley in 1958, thanking him for his early recognition of the importance of the atom. In 1959, he published This Is What We Had in Mind: Early Memories of the University of South Dakota, a partial autobiography and history of USD.

== Death and legacy ==
Akeley died in Vermillion on September 5, 1961, six months after turning 100, making him a centenarian. He was buried in Bluff View Cemetery in Vermillion.

Akeley was inducted into the South Dakota Hall of Fame in 1978. Several location on USD's campus have been named in his honor, most notably the Akeley-Lawrence Science Center, as well as the Department of Philosophy's Lewis E. Akeley Library of Philosophy.

== Personal life ==
Akeley married Myra A. Thomas in Vermillion in 1891. They had two children together, both of whom entered education; their son, Edward, became an associate professor at Purdue University, and their daughter, Marian, became a schoolteacher. Marian's son, Akeley Miller, later became a physics lecturer at USD. Edward's wives Evelyn Niemann Akeley and Anna Akeley were both noted scientists, and Edward amassed a collection of twentieth-century art, including works by Diego Rivera, Käthe Kollwitz, and Leonora Carrington.

Akeley was also a member of Phi Beta Kappa and Alpha Delta Phi.

== Publications ==
- Akeley, L. E. (May 1915). "Bergson and Science". The Philosophical Review. 24 (3): 270–287. doi:10.2307/2178333. JSTOR 2178333.
- Akeley, Lewis Ellsworth (October 8, 1925). "The Problem of the Specious Present and Physical Time: The Problem Generalized". The Journal of Philosophy. 22 (21): 561–573. doi:10.2307/2014497. JSTOR 2014497.
- Akeley, Lewis E. (October 27, 1927). "Wholes and Prehensive Unities for Physics and Philosophy". The Journal of Philosophy. 24 (22): 589–608. doi:10.2307/2014709. JSTOR 2014709.
- Akeley, Lewis E. (December 6, 1934). "The Problematic Situation. Its Symbolization and Meanings". The Journal of Philosophy. 31 (25): 673–681. doi:10.2307/2016108. JSTOR 2016108.
- Akeley, Lewis E. (1959). This Is What We Had in Mind: Early Memories of the University of South Dakota. Vermillion: University of South Dakota.
