= Delia Akeley =

American explorer

Delia J. Akeley
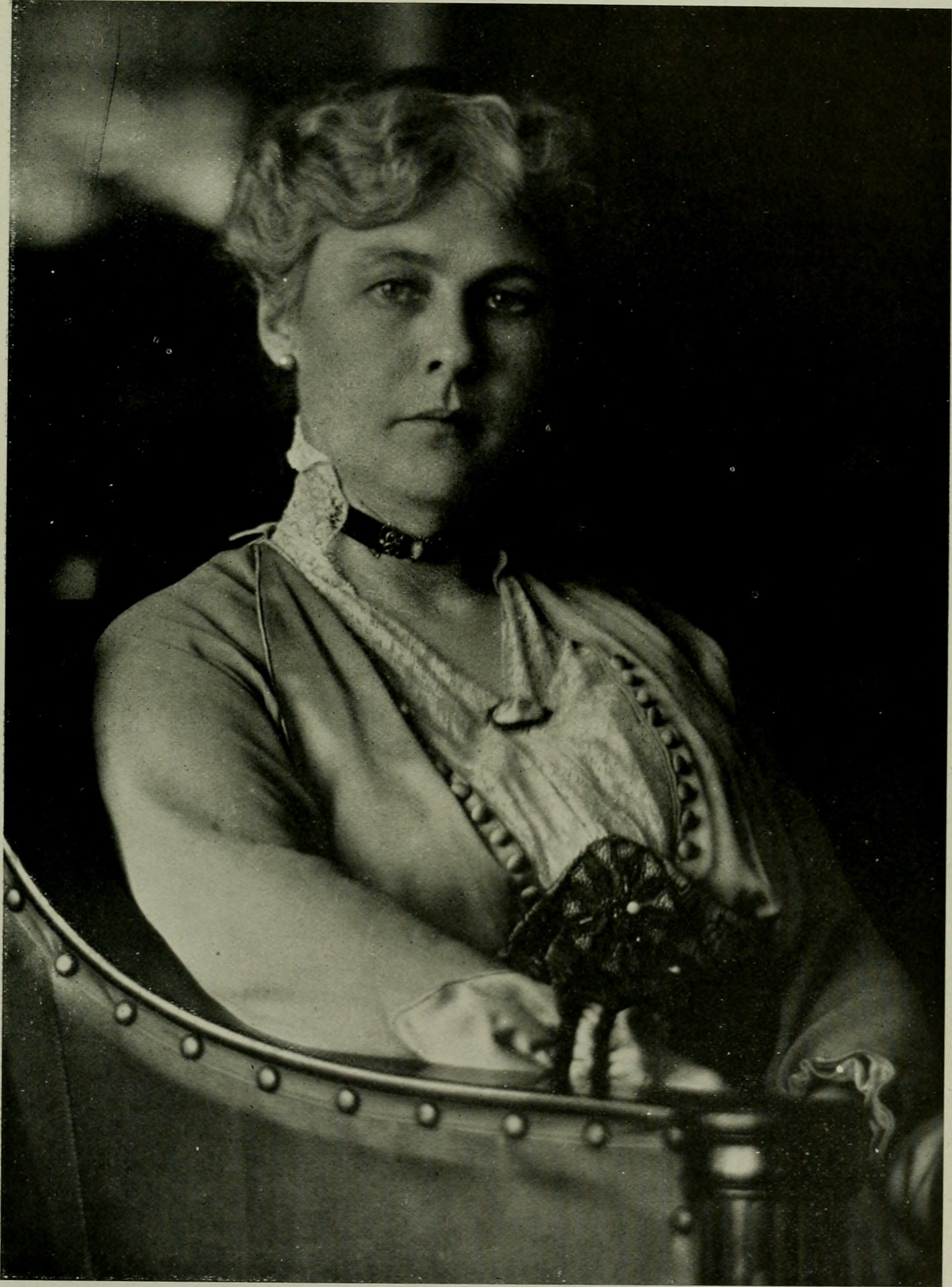
- Delia Akeley in 1915
- Born: Delia Julia Denning; December 5, 1869; Beaver Dam, Wisconsin, U.S.
- Died: May 22, 1970 (aged 100); Daytona Beach, Florida, U.S.
- Other name: Mickie Akeley
- Occupations: Explorer; hunter
- Spouses: Arthur Reiss (m. 1889; div. 1902) Carl Akeley (m. 1902; div. 1923) Warren D. Howe (m. 1939; died 1951)

Delia Julia "Mickie" Akeley (née Denning, formerly Reiss, later Howe; December 5, 1869 – May 22, 1970) was an American explorer. She was born in Beaver Dam, Wisconsin, a daughter of Irish immigrants, Patrick and Margaret (née Hanberry) Denning.

== Early life ==
Delia Julia Akeley was born in 1869, although over the years, whether due to Delia's own misrepresentation or that of others, her birth year has been given as 1875. She ran away from home in her late teens and made her way to Milwaukee, where she married Arthur Reiss, a barber, in 1889. She was just shy of her 20th birthday, but because of the erroneous attribution of her birth date, virtually every published account states that she was 14 when she married Reiss.

== With Carl E. Akeley ==
In Milwaukee she met taxidermist, artist and inventor Carl E. Akeley, who was employed at the Milwaukee Public Museum. Akeley biographers Penelope Bodry-Sanders and Jay Kirk suggest that Delia and Akeley had an affair; in any case, Delia and Reiss soon divorced, and in 1902 Delia married Akeley, who by then had become Taxidermist-in-Chief at the Field Columbian Museum in Chicago, later the Field Museum of Natural History.

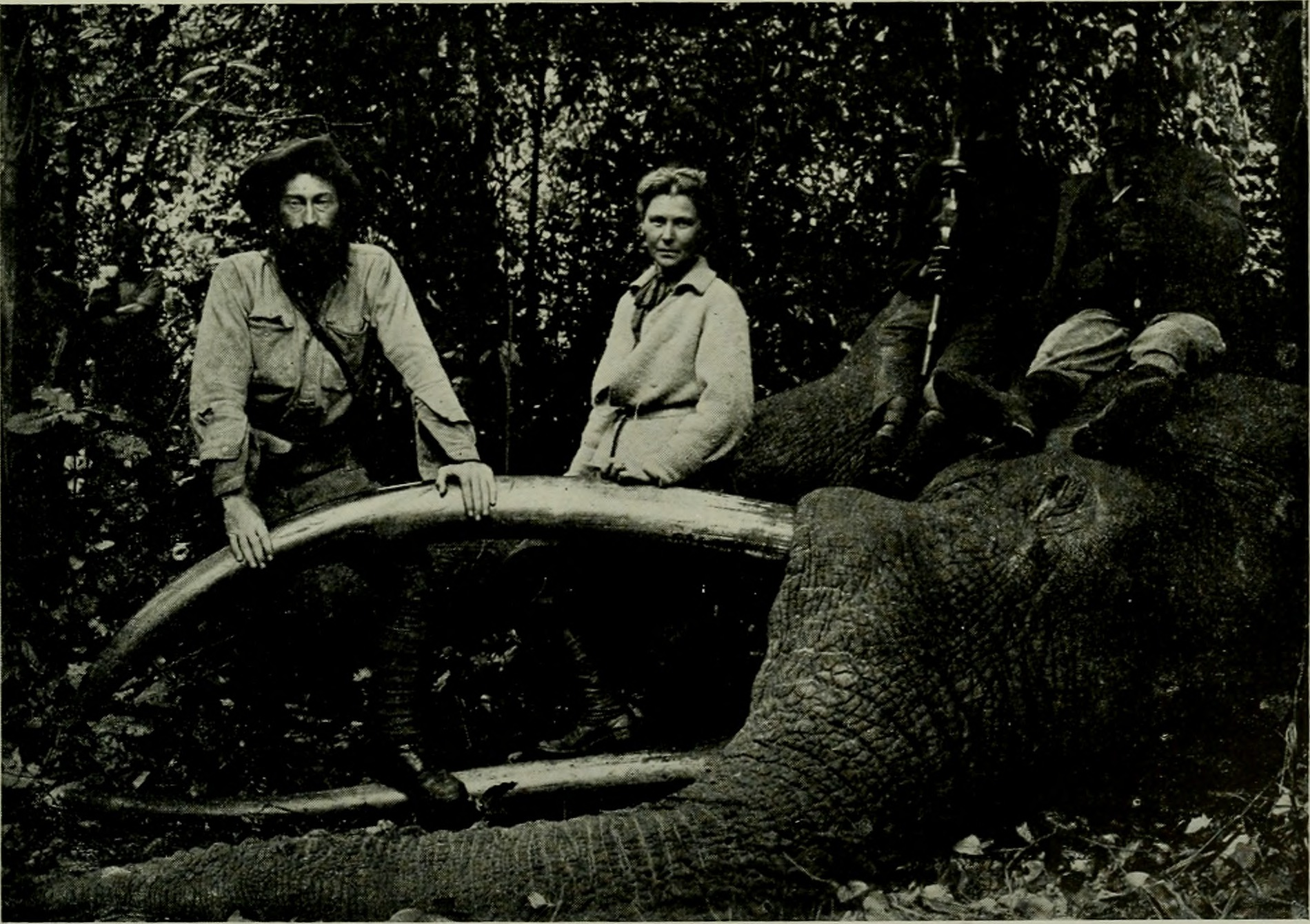
Delia Akeley with her kill (1906)

During his years at the Field, she assisted her husband in the creation of his groundbreaking Four Seasons of the Virginia Deer dioramas, and joined him on a 1906-07 collecting expedition to Africa. Akeley later joined the American Museum of Natural History in New York where he continued his taxidermy work and conceived the great Africa Hall. Delia accompanied Akeley on expeditions to collect specimens central to the most important displays in the African sections of both museums. The larger of the mounted African elephants known as the "Fighting Bulls" in the Field Museum's main hall was killed by Delia on the 1906 Field Museum expedition, and she also collected one of the members of the elephant group in the African Hall at the American Museum of Natural History on a 1909-11 expedition for that museum.

In Kenya, when hunting the elephants that were to form the most important of all the displays in the African Hall of the American Museum of Natural History, Carl Akeley was attacked by a bull elephant while out hunting with a team of his porters and helpers. They panicked and ran thinking he was done for. But Akeley survived, in no small part because Delia traveled back to his body with two porters who had initially fled in terror. He was seriously injured, but Delia got him to a hospital after a dangerous portage in mountainous country. She also nursed him back from the brink of death on at least one other occasion when he would have succumbed to blackwater fever^{2}

In 1920, after Carl's recovery from blackwater fever, the Akeleys returned to New York accompanied by a pet monkey called "J.T. Jr.", acquired by the Akeleys during their last expeditions in Kenya. Back in New York, Carl Akeley spent his time raising money for the museum, sculpting models for his dioramas, and becoming better acquainted with Mary Lenore Jobe (1878–1966), a former debutante and Bryn Mawr graduate who had become an African explorer and ethnographer. Delia became increasingly occupied with the care and study of J.T. who was an extremely bright and jealous primate.

Both Bodry-Sanders and Kirk suggest that Delia's obsession with the monkey, and increasing isolation from the outside world, contributed to the deterioration of the Akeley marriage, and an acrimonious divorce occurred in 1923.

Carl married his second wife, Mary, in 1924 when he was 60 and she was 46. Both returned to Africa to hunt and study the mountain gorillas. In 1926, Carl contracted what has been described as dysentery but involved aggressive progression and aggressive bleeding from his orifices.

== Later life ==
In 1924, after her divorce, Delia continued to travel widely in Africa leading her own expeditions and concentrating more on the ethnography of the more reclusive tribes such as the Forest People pygmies. She was one of the first westerners to explore the desert between Kenya and Ethiopia, and she explored the Tana River in a dugout canoe, entering it from the Indian Ocean. She also lived for several months with the pygmies of the Ituri Forest, Zaire.

On January 4, 1939, she married Warren D. Howe, a businessman, who died in 1951. She was listed in the 1946 edition of Who's Who in America.

== Death ==
Delia Akeley died in 1970. Although her obituary lists her age at the time of death as 95, she was in fact 100 years old.

== Bibliography ==
Her autobiographical works include:

- Jungle Portraits
- All True!

She was one of the first authors to write a non-anthropomorphic but psychologically insightful biography of another primate:

- J.T. Junior: The Biography of an African Monkey (Macmillan: 1928) OCLC 547783

Together with Christina Dodwell, Mary Kingsley, Florence Baker, and Alexine Tinne, she was one of the five subjects of a book by Margo McLoone:

- Women explorers in Africa (1997).

Delia Akeley is included as a subject in a book on women explorers:

- Verwegene Frauen Weiblicher Entdeckergeist und die Erforschung der Welt, written by Lorie Karnath.

== Sources ==
- Delia J. Akeley, J.T. Junior: The Biography of an African Monkey (Macmillan Company, 1928) OCLC 547783
- D. Akeley, Jungle Portraits (The Macmillan Company, 1930)
- Penelope Body-Sanders, African Obsession: The Life and Legacy of Carl Akeley (Batax, 1998); ISBN 0962975990/ISBN 978-0962975998
- Lorie Karnath, Verwegene Frauen Weiblicher Entdeckergeist und die Erforschung der Welt (Terra Magica, 2009) ISBN 3724310234 ISBN 978-3724310235)
- Jay Kirk, Kingdom Under Glass: A Tale of Obsession, Adventure, and One Man's Quest to Preserve the World's Great Animals (Henry Holt and Co., 2010); ASIN: B0057DAQ54
- Elizabeth Fagg Olds, Women of the Four Winds: The Adventures of Four of America's First Women Explorers (Mariner Books, 1999); ISBN 0395957842/ISBN 978-0395957844
- Douglas J. Preston, Dinosaurs in the Attic (St. Martin's Griffin; Reissue edition (November 15, 1993)), ISBN 0312104561/ISBN 978-0312104566
