= Michael Crichton bibliography =

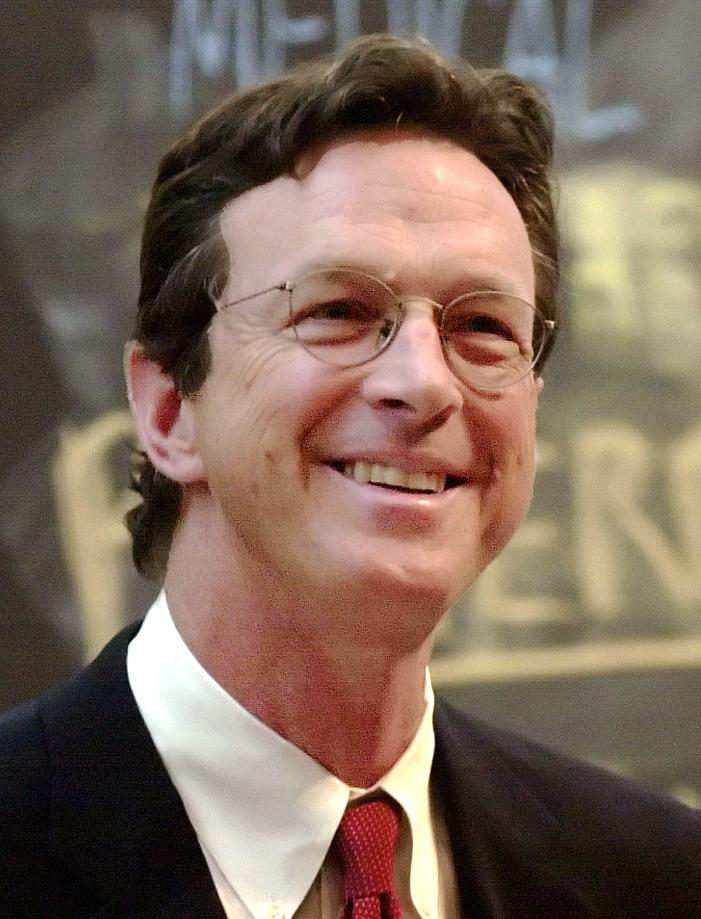
- Novels↙: 30
- Stories↙: 10
- Nonfiction↙: 4

Michael Crichton (1942–2008) was an American novelist and screenwriter. He wrote 30 novels and his books have sold over 200 million copies worldwide, and over a dozen have been adapted into films.

== Bibliography ==
=== Novels ===
Year	Title	Notes	# Novel	Under Own Name	Published after Death	Adapted into Film	Ref.
1966	Odds On	as John Lange	1	No	No	No	
1967	Scratch One	as John Lange	2	No	No	No	
1968	Easy Go	as John Lange (also titled as The Last Tomb)	3	No	No	No	
1968	A Case of Need	as Jeffery Hudson (re-released as Crichton in 1993)	4	No	No	Yes	
1969	Zero Cool	as John Lange	5	No	No	No	
1969	The Andromeda Strain		6	Yes	No	Yes	
1969	The Venom Business	as John Lange	7	No	No	No	
1970	Drug of Choice	as John Lange (also titled Overkill)	8	No	No	No	
1970	Dealing	as Michael Douglas (with brother Douglas Crichton)	9	No	No	Yes	
1970	Grave Descend	as John Lange	10	No	No	No	
1972	Binary	as John Lange (re-released as by Crichton in 1993)	11	No	No	Yes	
1972	The Terminal Man		12	Yes	No	Yes	
1975	The Great Train Robbery		13	Yes	No	Yes	
1976	Eaters of the Dead	also titled The 13th Warrior	14	Yes	No	Yes	
1980	Congo		15	Yes	No	Yes	
1987	Sphere		16	Yes	No	Yes	
1990	Jurassic Park		17	Yes	No	Yes	
1992	Rising Sun		18	Yes	No	Yes	
1994	Disclosure		19	Yes	No	Yes	
1995	The Lost World		20	Yes	No	Yes	
1996	Airframe		21	Yes	No	No	
1999	Timeline		22	Yes	No	Yes	
2002	Prey		23	Yes	No	No	
2004	State of Fear		24	Yes	No	No	
2006	Next		25	Yes	No	No	
2009	Pirate Latitudes	Posthumous publication	26	Yes	Yes	No	
2011	Micro	Posthumous publication (completed by Richard Preston)	27	Yes	Yes	No	
2017	Dragon Teeth	Posthumous publication	28	Yes	Yes	No	
2024	Eruption	Posthumous publication (completed by James Patterson)	29	Yes	Yes	No	
2026	A Murder in Hollywood	Posthumous publication (written as John Lange)	30	Yes	Yes	No	

=== Post-Crichton novel ===
Year	Title	Author	Ref.
2019	The Andromeda Evolution	Daniel H. Wilson	

=== Short fiction ===
Year	Title	Originally published	Notes
1957	"Johnny at 8:30"	First Words (1993)	poem
1960	"[Untitled]"	First Words (1993)	fan titled Well, Nothing.
1961	"Life Goes to a Party"	First Words (1993)	
1961	"The Most Important Part of the Lab"	First Words (1993)	
1968	"Villa of Assassins"	Stag Annual (1968)	as John Lange; excerpted from Scratch One (1967)
1968	"How Does That Make You Feel?"	Playboy (November 1968)	as Jeffrey Hudson
1970	"The Death Divers"	Man's World (December 1970)	as John Lange; excerpted from Grave Descend (1970)
1971	"The Most Powerful Tailor in the World"	Playboy (September 1971)	
1984	"Mousetrap: A Tale of Computer Crime"	Life (January 1984)	
2003	"Blood Doesn't Come Out"	McSweeney's Mammoth Treasury of Thrilling Tales (2003)	

=== Nonfiction ===
Year	Title
1970	Five Patients
1977	Jasper Johns
1983	Electronic Life
1988	Travels

== Film and Television ==
=== Film ===
Year	Title	Director	Writer	Producer	Notes
1973	Extreme Close-Up	No	Yes	No	
1973	Westworld	Yes	Yes	No	
1978	Coma	Yes	Yes	No	
1978	The Great Train Robbery	Yes	Yes	No	Also based on his novel
1981	Looker	Yes	Yes	No	
1984	Runaway	Yes	Yes	No	
1989	Physical Evidence	Yes	No	No	
1993	Jurassic Park	No	Yes	No	Also based on his novel
1993	Rising Sun	No	Yes	No	Also based on his novel
1994	Disclosure	No	No	Yes	Also based on his novel
1996	Twister	No	Yes	Yes	
1998	Sphere	No	No	Yes	Also based on his novel
1999	The 13th Warrior	Uncredited	No	Yes	Uncredited reshoots Director; Also based on his novel
2003	Timeline	No	No	No	Also based on his novel

=== Television ===
Year	Title	Director	Writer	Executive Producer	Notes
1971–1974	Insight	No	Yes	No	Episodes "The War of the Eggs", "Killer" & "The Theft"
1972	Pursuit	Yes	No	No	TV movie Also based on his 1972 novel "Binary"
1994–2009	ER	No	Yes	Yes	Also creator

== Derivative works ==
=== Films based on Crichton's novels ===
Year	Title	Director
1971	The Andromeda Strain	Robert Wise
1972	Dealing: Or the Berkeley-to-Boston Forty-Brick Lost-Bag Blues	Paul Williams
1972	The Carey Treatment (A Case of Need)	Blake Edwards
1974	The Terminal Man	Mike Hodges
1979	The First Great Train Robbery	Michael Crichton
1993	Jurassic Park	Steven Spielberg
1993	Rising Sun	Philip Kaufman
1994	Disclosure	Barry Levinson
1995	Congo	Frank Marshall
1997	The Lost World: Jurassic Park	Steven Spielberg
1998	Sphere	Barry Levinson
1999	The 13th Warrior (Eaters of the Dead)	John McTiernan
2001	Jurassic Park III (based on characters created by Crichton)	Joe Johnston
2003	Timeline	Richard Donner
2015	Jurassic World (based on characters created by Crichton)	Colin Trevorrow
2018	Jurassic World: Fallen Kingdom (based on characters created by Crichton)	J. A. Bayona
2022	Jurassic World Dominion (based on characters created by Crichton)	Colin Trevorrow
2025	Jurassic World Rebirth (based on characters created by Crichton)	Gareth Edwards

=== Sequel to Crichton's film ===
Year	Title	Director
1976	Futureworld (sequel to Westworld)	Richard T. Heffron
2024	Twisters (based on characters created by Crichton; sequel to Twister)	Lee Isaac Chung

=== Television series based on Crichton's films ===
Year	Title	Network	Producers
1980	Beyond Westworld	CBS	Lou Shaw
2016–2022	Westworld	HBO	J. J. Abrams, Jonathan Nolan, Lisa Joy

=== Novels adapted into television series ===
Year	Title	Network	Producers
2008	The Andromeda Strain	A&E Network	Ridley Scott, Tony Scott, Mikael Salomon

=== In development ===
Year	Title	Network	Producers
TBA	Dragon Teeth	National Geographic	TBA
TBA	Sphere	HBO	TBA
