= Jasper Johns (book) =

Coffee table book by Michael Crichton

- First edition cover
- Author: Michael Crichton
- Language: English
- Publisher: Harry N. Abrams
- Publication date: January 1977
- Publication place: United States
- Media type: Print (Hardcover)
- Pages: 248
- ISBN: 0-8109-1161-2
- OCLC: 3001846
- Dewey Decimal: 709/.2/4
- LC Class: N6537.J6 .A4 1977
- Preceded by: Five Patients
- Followed by: Electronic Life

Jasper Johns is a non-fiction coffee table book written by Michael Crichton about the artist Jasper Johns. It was originally published in 1977 by Harry N. Abrams Inc in association with the Whitney Museum of American Art, and a second revised edition (ISBN 0810935155) was published in 1994. It is his second non-fiction book.

In Crichton's 1972 novel, The Terminal Man, psychiatrist Janet Ross owned a copy of the painting Numbers by Jasper Johns. The technophobic antagonist of the story found it odd that a person would paint numbers as they were inorganic.

Michael Crichton himself had a serious art collection, including several works by Jasper Johns. Most of them were sold at an auction in Christie’s in 2010.
