= The Terminal Man (film) =

1974 film by Mike Hodges

- Theatrical release poster
- Directed by: Mike Hodges
- Screenplay by: Mike Hodges
- Based on: The Terminal Man; 1972 novel by Michael Crichton
- Produced by: Mike Hodges
- Starring: George Segal; Joan Hackett; Richard A. Dysart; Jill Clayburgh; Donald Moffat; Matt Clark; Michael C. Gwynne
- Cinematography: Richard H. Kline
- Edited by: Robert L. Wolfe
- Distributed by: Warner Bros.
- Release date: June 19, 1974
- Running time: 107 minutes
- Country: United States
- Language: English
- Budget: $3.5 million

The Terminal Man is a 1974 American horror science fiction film directed by Mike Hodges, based on the 1972 novel of the same name by Michael Crichton. Starring George Segal and Joan Hackett, the film centers on the danger of mind control and the power of computers.

== Plot ==
Harry Benson, an intelligent computer scientist in his 30s, has epilepsy. He often has seizures that induce blackouts, after which he awakens to unfamiliar surroundings with indications of violent behavior on his part. He also has delusions that computers will rise up against humans.

Benson has Acute Disinhibitory Lesion syndrome and consents to an experimental psychosurgical procedure known as "Stage Three". Stage Three requires surgeons to implant electrodes in his brain, which will detect the onset of a seizure and then use an electrical impulse to stop it. Benson's psychiatrist, Janet Ross, opposes the procedure, concerned that once the operation is complete, Benson will suffer further psychosis as a result of his person merging with that of a computer, something he has come to distrust and disdain.

The surgery does initially appear to be a success, but two days after the operation, it is apparent that his brain has become addicted to the electrical impulses. The seizures are triggering at increasingly shorter intervals. When they become continuous, Benson will be in a permanent blackout, with the violent behavior that goes with it.

Just before Ross realizes what is happening, Benson escapes from the hospital. He becomes unpredictably violent, but his intact intelligence allows him to evade the police for a considerable time, at one point confronting Ross in her home. Benson goes to a cemetery where he falls into a freshly dug grave. A procession walking towards the grave notice him in the grave with a gun and alert the authorities. Ross arrives and pleads with Benson to allow her to help him but is held back as a police helicopter shoots him as he attempts to raise his gun. The film ends with some doctors opening a peephole looking into the camera and telling the audience that they are next for the medical procedure.

== Cast ==
- George Segal as Harry Benson
- Joan Hackett as Dr. Janet Ross
- Richard A. Dysart as Dr. John Ellis
- Jill Clayburgh as Angela Black / Doris Blankfort
- Donald Moffat as Dr. Arthur McPherson
- Matt Clark as Gerhard
- Michael C. Gwynne as Dr. Robert Morris
- Norman Burton as Det. Capt. Anders
- William Hansen as Dr. Ezra Manon
- Jason Wingreen as Instructor
- Victor Argo as Orderly
- James B. Sikking as Ralph Friedman
- Ian Wolfe as Priest
- Jack Colvin as Detective

== Production ==
In January 1972 it was announced Warner Bros had bought the rights to make a film of the novel, with Michael Crichton to write the script and direct. However when Crichton wrote the script Warners felt he had departed from the source material too much and had another writer adapt it. "I thought I'd given them a terrific script and they hired another director," said Crichton. "I was very disappointed not to direct."

"I don't think they [Warner Bros] gave it a chance," said Crichton later.

The film was shot in Los Angeles and Burbank Studios, with the Forest Lawn Cemetery and the Ennis House serving as locations in the film. When preparing the film, Hodges wanted to shoot in black and white but the studio would not let him. The film was influenced by the work of Edward Hopper. “The American painter Edward Hopper was relatively unknown here in those days. I certainly had never heard of him. Something made me pick up a book of his paintings in Pickwick's bookshop on Hollywood Boulevard. I opened it and there was my film. There was the loneliness of urban America on every page. I can remember snipping my film down to match the loneliness that Hopper had captured."

== Reception ==
The Terminal Man was not released in the UK, was successful in Japan and, according to Hodges, the film was dumped in the United States, receiving very limited screenings. "We had one terrible preview. They projected it without sound for the first 10 minutes, which was excruciating. American audiences found the film too uncompromising, too tough to take. The reviews were dire. I think people had a problem accepting George Segal in the lead role. At that time, he was known as a light comedian, but I wanted him for the film. I liked the fact that it was unusual casting. He is terribly good in it and, now that his career is not too top heavy with comedy, you can see him purely as an actor – and a good one."

Nora Sayre gave the film a negative review in The New York Times, describing it as dull and slow: "George Segal's resilience, humor, and versatility have redeemed quite a few bad scripts. But this role gives him little chance to act, beyond making like a Zombie and rolling his eyeballs back..."

Stanley Kubrick was a Hodges admirer – “Any actor who sees Get Carter will want to work with him.” When Mike Kaplan, a Warner Bros international marketing executive, attempted to override Warner Bros' decision not to release the film in Britain, he sought Kubrick's help. After explaining the situation, and how the film required a different marketing campaign, Kubrick interrupted with, “I’ve already seen it and it’s terrific.”

The director Terrence Malick wrote to Hodges expressing how much he loved watching The Terminal Man, saying "I have just come from seeing The Terminal Man and want you to know what a magnificent, overwhelming picture it is. You achieve moods that I’ve never experienced in the movies before, though it’s only in hope of finding them that I keep going. Your images make me understand what an image is, not a pretty picture but something that should pierce one through like an arrow and speak in a language all its own."

== Alternate versions ==
On its release at the 2003 Edinburgh Film Festival, there was a "director's cut", which Hodges edited himself by removing the self-contained opening expository scene of the doctor looking at photographs of Harry Benson (production studio notes had insisted the scene would give the audience "someone to root for".).

== See also ==
- The Happiness Cage
- List of American films of 1974
