= Electronic Life =

1983 nonfiction book by Michael Crichton

- First edition cover
- Author: Michael Crichton
- Language: English
- Publisher: Alfred A. Knopf
- Publication date: August 12, 1983
- Publication place: United States
- Media type: Print (Hardcover)
- Pages: 209
- ISBN: 0-394-53406-9
- OCLC: 9646447
- Dewey Decimal: 001.64 19
- LC Class: QA76.5 .C74 1983
- Preceded by: Jasper Johns
- Followed by: Travels

Electronic Life is a 1983 nonfiction book by Michael Crichton, an author better known for his novels. It is his third non-fiction book.

== Description ==
Crichton owned several computers, and he wrote articles and computer programs in the programming language BASIC for Creative Computing magazine. He was inspired to write Electronic Life because so many of his friends would call him asking for advice on computers.

The book was intended to introduce the idea of personal computers to a reader who might be faced with them at work or at home for the first time. It defined basic jargon and assured readers that they could master the machine when it inevitably arrived.

Electronic Life is written as a glossary, with entries like "Afraid of Computers (everybody is)", "Buying a Computer", and "Computer Crime". Entries consist mainly of Crichton's musings on these topics, and few of the entries reflect any research. The computer crime entry, for example, is three pages long and contains only four hard facts—specifically, that institutions were then losing $5 billion to $30 billion a year on computer crime, that Citibank processed $30 billion a day in customer transactions using computers, that American banks as a whole were moving $400 billion a year in the U.S., and that the Stanford public key code (not otherwise described) had been broken in 1982. No examples of computer crime are given, though by 1983 such accounts were appearing in the mainstream press, and dedicated books on the topic had been around for at least a decade.

Some portions of the book are dated. On page 140, Crichton points out that if you ask your computer to compute 5.01*5.02-5.03/2.04*100.5+3.06+20.07-200.08+300.09/1.10, there will be a noticeable delay as it works out the answer. Later he suggests that a user would do well to buy a CP/M-based system, because of all the excellent applications for that platform.

In the book, Crichton correctly predicts that computer networks would increase in importance. He saw this as a matter of convenience—computers can share pictures, which you can't do with a verbal phone call, and computer networks can operate asynchronously, so you can leave information for somebody and have them pick it up at their convenience.

He also comments on games that are played on computers, saying "Arcade games are the hula hoops of the '80s, and already there are indications that the mania for twitch games (another name for arcade games) may be fading... However, unlike hula hoops, the present generation of computer games represents a transitional phenomenon on the way to a permanent alteration of our world. Computers are the most compelling toy ever invented ... Ever more elaborate and challenging games will be played on computers in the future. Why not? It's a way of making friends with the machine."

In a section called "Microprocessors, or how I flunked biostatistics at Harvard", Crichton lashes out at a medical school teacher who had given him a 'D' fifteen years earlier.

== Reception ==
Jerry Pournelle named Electronic Life as his "book of the month" in BYTE in June 1985, writing that "Dr. Crichton has managed to pack a great deal of useful information, philosophy, and common sense into 250+ pages. Recommended for almost everyone; even experienced hackers will find parts interesting and can then keep the book around to lend to beginners".

== See also ==
- Video game crash of 1983
