= The 13th Warrior =

1999 film by John McTiernan

- Theatrical release poster
- Directed by: John McTiernan
- Screenplay by: William Wisher Jr.; Warren Lewis
- Based on: Eaters of the Dead by Michael Crichton
- Produced by: John McTiernan; Michael Crichton; Ned Dowd
- Starring: Antonio Banderas; Diane Venora; Omar Sharif
- Cinematography: Peter Menzies Jr.
- Edited by: John Wright
- Music by: Jerry Goldsmith
- Production company: Touchstone Pictures
- Distributed by: Buena Vista Pictures Distribution
- Release date: August 27, 1999
- Running time: 103 minutes
- Country: United States
- Language: English
- Budget: $85–160 million
- Box office: $61.7 million

The 13th Warrior is a 1999 American historical fiction action film based on Michael Crichton's 1976 novel Eaters of the Dead. It stars Antonio Banderas as Ahmad ibn Fadlan (credited as Ahmed ibn Fahdlan), as well as Diane Venora and Omar Sharif. It was directed by John McTiernan; Crichton directed some uncredited reshoots. The film was produced by McTiernan, Crichton and Ned Dowd, with Andrew G. Vajna, James Biggam and Ethan Dubrow as executive producers.

Production and marketing costs reportedly ranged from $100–$160 million, but it grossed $61 million worldwide, becoming the biggest box-office bomb of 1999, with losses of up to $129 million. Despite its critical and box office failure, the film has since cultivated a devoted cult following and is credited with pioneering a Muslim hero in Hollywood blockbusters.

== Plot ==
Ahmed ibn Fahdlan is a court poet of the Abbasid Caliph Al-Muqtadir of Baghdad until his amorous encounter with the wife of an influential noble gets him exiled as an "ambassador" to the Volga Bulgars. Traveling with his father's old friend, Melchisidek, his caravan is saved from Tatar raiders by the appearance of Norsemen. He takes refuge at their settlement on the Volga River, and communications are established through Melchisidek and Herger, one of the Norsemen, who happens to speak Latin. From Herger, both learn that the celebration being held by the Norsemen is in fact the precursor to a funeral for their recently deceased king Hygelak. Herger also introduces them to one of the king's sons, Buliwyf. Ahmed and Melchisidek witness a fight in which Buliwyf kills his brother in self-defense, which establishes Buliwyf as heir apparent. That is followed by Hygelak's funeral, who is traditionally cremated on a Viking ship, set adrift with a female slave who offers to sacrifice herself and accompany him to Valhalla, the Norse afterlife.

The next day, the young Prince Wulfgar enters the camp to request Buliwyf's aid; his father, King Hrothgar, has asked for assistance, as his lands in the far north are under attack from an ancient evil so frightening that even the bravest warriors dare not name it. A völva (wisewoman) identifies this as the "angel of death" and says that the mission will be successful but only if thirteen warriors face this danger, and the thirteenth must not be a Norseman. Ahmed is automatically and unwillingly recruited.

Ahmed is initially treated indifferently by the Norsemen, but they mock his smaller Arabian horse. However, he earns a measure of respect with a demonstration of horsemanship, his ability to write and by quickly learning their language. Buliwyf, already himself a polyglot, asks Ahmed to teach him the Arabic script, which cements their mutual goodwill. Buliwyf sees Ahmed's analytic ways as an asset to their quest.

Reaching Hrothgar's kingdom, they confirm that their foe is indeed the ancient "Wendol", fiends who come with the mist to kill and take human heads. While the group searches through a raided cabin, they find a Venus figurine, which is said to represent the "Mother of the Wendol". On the first night, the warriors Hyglak and Ragnar die. After a string of clashes, Buliwyf's band determines that the Wendol are human cannibals, who are clad to appear like bears, live like bears and think of themselves as bears.

The warriors' numbers dwindling, having also lost Skeld, Halga, Roneth and Rethel, and their positions all but indefensible, they consult another völva of the village. She tells them to track the Wendol to their lair and destroy their leaders, specifically the "Mother of the Wendol", and their warlord, who wears "the horns of power". Buliwyf and the remaining warriors infiltrate the Wendol caves and kill the Mother but not before Buliwyf is scratched deeply across the shoulder by a claw attached to her hand, dipped in poison.

Ahmed and the last of the Norse warriors escape the caves but without the injured Helfdane, who opts to stay behind and fight. They return to the village to prepare for a last stand. Buliwyf staggers outside before the battle and inspires the warriors with a Viking prayer for the honored dead who will enter Valhalla. Buliwyf succeeds in killing the Wendol warlord, defeats them, and succumbs to the poison. Ahmed witnesses Buliwyf's royal funeral alongside the four surviving members of the 13 (Herger, Weath, Edgtho, and Haltaf) before returning to his homeland, grateful to the Norsemen for helping him to "become a man and a useful servant of God".

== Cast ==
- Antonio Banderas as Ahmed ibn Fahdlan
- Diane Venora as Queen Weilew
- Vladimir Kulich as Buliwyf, The Leader
- Dennis Storhøi as Herger, The Joyous
- Omar Sharif as Melchisidek
- Anders T. Andersen as Wigliff, King's Son
- Richard Bremmer as Skeld, The Superstitious
- Tony Curran as Weath, The Musician
- Mischa Hausserman as Rethel, The Archer
- Neil Maffin as Roneth, The Rider
- Asbjorn Riis as Halga, The Wise
- Clive Russell as Helfdane, The Fat
- Daniel Southern as Edgtho, The Silent
- Oliver Sveinall as Haltaf, The Boy
- Sven Wollter as King Hrothgar
- Albie Woodington as Hyglak, The Quarrelsome
- John DeSantis as Ragnar, The Dour
- Eric Avari as Caravan Leader
- Maria Bonnevie as Olga
- Bjorn Ove Pedersen as Wulfgar, the Boy Messenger

Additionally, Kristen Cloke makes an uncredited appearance as the Mother of the Wendol, replacing Susan Willis, whose name remained in the closing credits despite her not appearing in the final cut.

== Production ==
Originally titled Eaters of the Dead, production began in the summer of 1997, but the film went through several re-edits after test audiences had not reacted well to the initial cut. Original novel author Michael Crichton took over as director himself because of the poor test audience reception, causing the release date to be pushed back over a year. The film was recut, and a new ending along with a new score was added. Graeme Revell was replaced by Jerry Goldsmith as composer. The title was changed to The 13th Warrior. John McTiernan has since gone on record as defending the film, stating the finished product was not entirely different from what he shot along with stating that he had originally wanted to do the film with Michael Keaton in mind for the lead role of Ahmed ibn Fahdlan.

The budget, which was originally around $85 million, reportedly soared to $100 million before principal photography concluded. With all of the re-shoots and promotional expenses, the total cost of the film was rumored to be as high as $160 million, which, given its lackluster box office take (earning US$61.7 million worldwide), made for a loss of $70–130 million.

=== Distinctions ===
With regards to dialogue throughout his body of work, McTiernan was uninterested in what line a character specifically says and more interested in the way a message can be conveyed to the audience visually:

"I clashed with the studios over this, because the producers wanted [The 13th Warrior] subtitled... when the whole point of the scene was to show that the main character didn't understand anything the people around him were saying! The studios wouldn't let it go, and I ended up adding subtitles... They did the same thing on Rollerball. They really hurt the film."

"There were a lot of problems with this film. It happens sometimes... And I'd rather not talk about my vision for the film, I'd rather not go into that... I had a different ending. I wanted to pay homage to Zulu Dawn, you know, the reenactment of the Battle of Isandlwana... There are three survivors left who have to face thousands of attackers. We know they won't withstand another assault. They look at all these Zulus gathered around them, and one of the survivors shouts, 'Why are you torturing us like this? Come and finish us off!' And one of his comrades replies, 'You don't understand; they're saluting our courage.' And the Zulus retreat... And we understand then that they were singing a song to the three survivors brave enough to keep fighting even though the battle is lost... It's a fabulous ending. And that's what I would have liked to do with The 13th Warrior."

Since the release of the film, McTiernan elaborated on some of the key distinctions between his original cut:

"[Crichton] wanted to stick in two shots, and they make me feel sick, but what the hell. [...] There's a terrible thing that they... the one thing they did [change] is they hid the fact that there's that woman in the beginning who is the wife of the dead chieftain and they hid the fact that they killed her. They just cut a little bit [...] but, that was important! [...] this is this woman who's about to die, okay, and she says this poem—Lo, there do I see my father and my mother... and that—right, okay? [...] there's one shot that lasted a little bit longer where, and I think, it was clear that they killed her, and the two Muslims there were shocked by it, um... were sickened by it. But the whole point was it was prayer to prepare to die, and at the end of the movie, all the heroes say the same prayer, okay? That was why the audience needed to know that she died!"

Other decisions McTiernan disapproved of was a shot "with an Indian and some buffalo horns" which he hated, and a music cue that was added to a scene toward the middle of the film "where they break tempo right in the middle of where the horse is, and it's stupidly dumb, but that's about [all]."

== Release ==
The film was pre-sold internationally by Buena Vista Film Sales.

== Reception ==
The film debuted at No. 2 on its opening weekend behind The Sixth Sense.

The 13th Warrior holds a 33% approval rating on Rotten Tomatoes based on 88 reviews. The consensus is: "Atmospheric, great sets and costumes, but thin plot." Metacritic, which uses a weighted average, assigned the film a score of 42 out of 100, based on 27 critics, indicating "mixed or average" reviews. Audiences polled by CinemaScore gave the film an average grade of "B−" on an A+ to F scale.

Roger Ebert gave the film one and a half stars out of four, remarking that it "lumber[s] from one expensive set-piece to the next without taking the time to tell a story that might make us care." Conversely, James Berardinelli gave The 13th Warrior three stars out of four, calling it "a solid offering" that "delivers an exhilarating 100 minutes". Lisa Schwarzbaum of Entertainment Weekly rated it A− and called it "the most unexpectedly audacious, exhilarating, and wildly creative adventure thriller I have seen in ages".

The outcome of the film's production disappointed Omar Sharif so much that he temporarily retired from film acting, not taking a role in another major film until 2003's Monsieur Ibrahim:

"After my small role in The 13th Warrior, I said to myself, 'Let us stop this nonsense, these meal tickets that we do because it pays well.' I thought, 'Unless I find a stupendous film that I love and that makes me want to leave home to do, I will stop.' Bad pictures are very humiliating, I was really sick. It is terrifying to have to do the dialogue from bad scripts, to face a director who does not know what he is doing, in a film so bad that it is not even worth exploring."

== Soundtrack ==
Professional ratings
Review scores
Source	Rating
AllMusic	2.5/5 stars
Filmtracks	4/5 stars

The original soundtrack was composed by Graeme Revell and featured the Dead Can Dance singer Lisa Gerrard. The score was rejected by Michael Crichton and was replaced by one composed by Crichton's usual collaborator Jerry Goldsmith.

== See also ==
- List of historical drama films
- List of biggest box-office bombs
