= The Great Train Robbery (novel) =

1975 novel by Michael Crichton

- First edition cover
- Author: Michael Crichton
- Language: English
- Genre: Historical novel, Crime novel
- Publisher: Knopf
- Publication date: May 1975
- Publication place: United States
- Media type: Print (hardcover)
- Pages: 266
- ISBN: 0-394-49401-6
- OCLC: 1175916
- Dewey Decimal: 813/.5/4
- LC Class: PZ4.C9178 Gr PS3553.R48
- Preceded by: The Terminal Man
- Followed by: Eaters of the Dead

The Great Train Robbery is a best-selling 1975 historical novel written by Michael Crichton, his third novel under his own name and his thirteenth novel overall. Originally published in the US by Alfred A. Knopf (then a division of Random House), it was later published by Avon, an imprint of HarperCollins Publishers. The novel tells the story of the Great Gold Robbery of 1855, a massive gold heist that takes place on a train travelling through Victorian-era England on 22 May 1855. Most of the book takes place in London. A 1978 film adaptation was written and directed by Crichton.

== Plot ==
In 1854, master thief Edward Pierce plans to steal a shipment of gold worth more than £12,000 being transported monthly from London to the Crimean War front. During transportation from London to Folkestone via train, the bank locks the gold in two custom-built safes, each with two locks, thus requiring a total of four keys to open. He recruits Robert Agar, a specialist in copying keys, as an accomplice.

Pierce's first target is the key held by bank president Edgar Trent. Through painstaking surveillance, conversations with bank employees, a deliberately bungled pickpocketing attempt and a likewise deliberate courtship of Trent's daughter Elizabeth, Pierce learns that Trent's key is kept at his mansion. With the assistance of his longtime mistress, an actress known only as "Miss Miriam", and his loyal associate, a buck cabby named Barlow, Pierce and Agar successfully break into Trent's home and wine cellar (where Pierce has learned the key is hidden) by night and make a wax impression of the key.

Bank manager Henry Fowler contracts syphilis and asks his friend Pierce to aid him in seeking a remedy: sleeping with a virgin. After supposedly making the necessary arrangements through a madam (actually "Miss Miriam"), who charges Fowler the exorbitant price of one hundred fifty pounds, Agar makes an impression of Fowler's key, which he always carries with him around his neck but takes off and leaves with his clothes during the assignation.

The other two keys are kept in a railway shipping department office at London Bridge Station. Pierce helps burglar "Clean Willy" Williams escape from Newgate Prison, and with his help the criminals succeed in making wax copies of the two keys at the railway station, completing the job with only seconds to spare before detection. Now possessing copies of all four keys, Pierce bribes Burgess, the poorly-paid train guard who rides in the baggage van containing the safes, to "look away". Agar is then able to perform a dry run of the theft on 17 February 1855, making sure that the copied keys work perfectly, and the actual robbery is scheduled for March. However, unforeseen events in both March and April force the thieves to postpone the robbery until May.

In mid-May, Pierce's plans are further disrupted when "Clean Willy" suddenly turns "nose" (police informant). Pierce's cabby Barlow murders Willy before he can reveal the most crucial information, although Willy has told enough to cause Edward Harranby, a very senior Scotland Yard official, to deduce that a major robbery is planned. Through careful manipulation of another "nose", Pierce is able to convince the police that his intent is to steal the transatlantic cable company payroll in Greenwich, diverting their attention and leaving the thieves free and clear to strike, with the actual robbery scheduled for May 22nd.

Unexpected changes in the railway's routine and tightened security, including an outside lock on the baggage van, cause difficulties the night before the robbery, but Pierce is able to find a last-minute way to smuggle Agar aboard the baggage van. While the train is en route to Folkestone, he manages to reach the baggage van over the roofs of the railway cars and unlock the door, and once inside he and Agar open the safes, remove the gold (replacing it in the strongboxes with packets of lead shot) and throw bags containing the bullion out of the van to a spot where Barlow will collect them. Pierce then relocks the door and manages to return over the roofs to his compartment before the train arrives at Folkestone. Sometime later, the theft of the gold is revealed when the French authorities check the contents of the strongboxes.

By the next day, much of England is in an uproar upon the discovery of the robbery, with every organisation involved in the gold shipment blaming each other, few leads as to the true culprits and no idea how it was done. The members of the gang, who have agreed to split the money two years after the robbery, drop out of sight, and gradually the public begins to lose interest.

Eighteen months later, Agar's mistress, who has been caught in the act of robbing a drunk, informs on Agar to escape imprisonment. Agar, who has been arrested on an unrelated charge, turns informant after being threatened by Harranby with transportation to Australia. Pierce and Burgess are arrested at a prize-fighting event in Manchester, but even after repeated questioning by the police and harsh treatment while being held in prison before trial (meant to force information out of him), Pierce refuses to reveal the whereabouts of Miriam, Barlow and the money. With Miriam and Barlow's assistance, Pierce escapes before sentencing while being transported from court. Both Agar and Burgess are found guilty; Burgess is sentenced to two years, but dies of cholera in prison, and Agar is transported to Australia, where he becomes wealthy. Pierce, Miriam, and Barlow disappear and, along with the money from the Great Train Robbery, are never heard from again.

== Characters ==
- Edward Pierce - A professional "cracksman" (burglar) who poses as a gentleman amongst his upper-class acquaintances in Victorian England. Pierce is arguably one of the most mysterious characters found in Crichton's works as almost nothing is known about his background; indeed, even his name is most likely false, as others refer to him as "John Simms", along with other aliases. Nonetheless, his actions and thoughts in the book consistently demonstrate a sharp intelligence and broad knowledge which far outstrips that of his fellow criminals and which has made him successful enough to be known as a "putter-up" (a planner of and financial backer for major criminal activities); perhaps his greatest asset is an ability to easily navigate through both the British underworld and the aristocracy. Throughout the planning and execution of the Great Train Robbery, Pierce is always cautious, never truly or fully trusting anyone—this caution is eventually justified as it is Agar, his closest accomplice, who finally sells him out.
- Robert Agar - A twenty-six-year-old "screwsman" (criminal who is skilled with copying keys and picking locks) at the beginning of the novel, Agar is pivotal to the eventual success of the Great Train Robbery, though he is also largely responsible for the culprits' eventual capture. He is apparently very well-acquainted with many criminals and helps Pierce identify many persons of interest, including the "nose" (police informant) Chokee Bill and the "snakesman" Clean Willy. Though he "turns nose" (becomes a police informant) at the end of the book in hopes of avoiding transportation to Australia, the judge sentences him there anyway and many years later he dies there a wealthy man. Michael Crichton depicts Robert Agar as Pierce's lackey with limited intelligence, though his real-life counterpart actually masterminded much of the robbery and got away with minor punishment.
- "Clean Willy" Williams - generally acknowledged to be the best "snakesman" available in London, although his skills and limited intelligence were apparently inadequate to prevent at least one arrest and one period of incarceration. Pierce goes to great expense to help Willy escape from a high-security prison for the sole purpose of enlisting the snakesman's aid in the train robbery. After successfully completing his tasks, Willy is paid off by Pierce and disappears for some time from the narrative before resurfacing as a "nose" (the circumstances of which are suspected but never fully gone into), almost jeopardizing the entire scheme. Ultimately, he is garroted by Barlow in a slum boardinghouse.
- Barlow - a violent thug and former mugger who serves Edward Pierce loyally as a cabby, although his services are also employed for other purposes, such as the murder of Clean Willy. He and Miss Miriam manage to elude capture by the authorities, eventually rescuing Pierce from the authorities before the trio completely disappears.
- Miss Miriam - Edward Pierce's mistress who is generally regarded as highly attractive by other characters in the book. She is also a talented actress and plays rather brief though important roles in the execution of the train robbery (such as pretending Agar is her dead brother and distracting Mr. Fowler while Pierce unlocks the baggage car). In many ways, she and Pierce are very similar and well suited for each other: both are resourceful and possess the ability to mix with men and women of all classes.

== Background ==
Crichton became aware of the story when lecturing at Cambridge University. He later read the transcripts of the court trial and started researching the historical period.

Cricton later wrote that when he had almost finished the novel he realised what the book was "really about is repression, and that’s what the whole Victorian period means. And the idea of criminals going against society made them the least repressed. That’s what the book is about, and this came totally after the fact. At the time, I was just writing a story."

== Historical deviations ==
Crichton's portrayal of the Great Gold Robbery contains fictionalized elements. The names of the real-world participants were changed; William Pierce became Edward Pierce, and Edward Agar became Robert Agar. In the novel, the gold is secured by safes requiring four separate keys. A significant portion of the book is focused on the elaborate, months-long operations to track down and clone each key from different high-security locations. In reality, the railway safes required only two keys, both of which were copied with relative ease through inside accomplices and brief office distractions. The book features a daring jailbreak to free an accomplice who is subsequently murdered to ensure his silence; neither the breakout nor the murder occurred in real life. The novel concludes with the protagonist staging an escape from custody after his sentencing. In reality, William Pierce did not escape; he was convicted and served his full sentence of two years of hard labor followed by ten years of penal servitude.

Crichton openly acknowledged these creative liberties, stating that for storytelling purposes, he did not want to be constrained by what actually happened. An accurate, non-fiction narrative of the robbery can be found in David C. Hanrahan's book The First Great Train Robbery.

== Reception ==
The New York Times called it "Mr Crichton's best thriller to date." The Los Angeles Times described it as "marvellous fun."

The book was one of the biggest best selling novels in the US in 1975.

Three audiobook versions have been released:

- an abridged version read by Michael Cumpsty released on audio cassette in 1996 by Random House (ISBN 978-0-6794-4895-2).
- two unabridged versions on CD, one read by Simon Prebble and released by Recorded Books, LLC in 2000 (ISBN 978-1-4281-1831-7) and one read by Michael Kitchen and released by Brilliance Audio in 2015 (ISBN 978-1-5012-1670-1).

== Film adaptation ==
The novel was later made into a 1978 film entitled The First Great Train Robbery directed by Crichton starring Sean Connery as Pierce, Donald Sutherland as Agar and Lesley-Anne Down as Miriam. Unlike the real incident, only Pierce is captured and tried and all of the protagonists are seen to escape to freedom after the trial. The film was nominated for Best Cinematography Award for the British Society of Cinematographers, and the film was also nominated for Best Motion Picture by the Edgar Allan Poe award by the Mystery Writers Association of America. The film score by Jerry Goldsmith was short, but a favourite in the composer's repertoire and an extended version of the music was released in 2004.
