= A Murder in Hollywood =

2026 novel by Michael Crichton

- Author: John Lange
- Language: English
- Genre: Mystery
- Publisher: Blackstone
- Publication date: 5 May 2026
- Pages: 200
- ISBN: 9798212514309

A Murder in Hollywood is a 2026 American novel by Michael Crichton written under his pseudonym of "John Lange". The book was written in 1973 but not published until after his death.

== Premise ==
A Hollywood movie, Bloodrock, is being filmed in Tucson, Arizona. A screenwriter is found dead in his motel room during the shoot. The brilliant insurance investigator, Harlow Perkins, is called in to find out what happened. He works with the film's unit publicist, Harvey Jason.

== Reception ==
According to Publishers Weekly, "Sharp humor, convincing dialogue, and breakneck pacing bring both the mystery and the movie set to life." A review in Kirkus Reviews described the characters as unmemorable, but wrote that the book provided a detailed account of Hollywood life and had a compelling ending. In Booklist, David Pitt wrote that the book made for an enjoyable read and described it as a "darned good book".
