= Five Patients =

1970 book by Michael Crichton

- First edition cover
- Author: Michael Crichton
- Language: English
- Publisher: Alfred A. Knopf
- Publication date: June 1970
- Publication place: United States
- Media type: Print (Hardcover)
- Pages: 231
- ISBN: 0-394-42508-1
- OCLC: 79062
- LC Class: RA982.B7
- Followed by: Jasper Johns

Five Patients is a non-fiction book by Michael Crichton that recounts his experiences of hospital practices during the late 1960s at Massachusetts General Hospital in Boston and describes the changes he anticipates in healthcare in coming years. It is his first non-fiction book.

The book describes each of five patients through their hospital experience and the context of their treatment. Crichton notes in the foreword of the 1994 reprint of this book that medical practices (both the culture, technology, and finances) have changed significantly since the book was written, but that the text was left as is to give a more complete glimpse into the past.

The five patients were Ralph Orlando, a construction worker seriously injured in a scaffold collapse; John O'Connor, a middle-aged dispatcher suffering from fever that has reduced him to a delirious wreck; Peter Luchesi, a young man who severs his hand in an accident; Sylvia Thompson, an airline passenger who suffers chest pains; and Edith Murphy, a mother of three who is diagnosed with a life-threatening disease.

Crichton recounts a brief history of medicine until 1969 to help contextualize hospital culture and practice and mentions national healthcare, drug prices, healthcare costs, and healthcare politics. The increasing cost of healthcare is a major theme – then at 15% per year.

He quotes Dr. James Howard Means, who is critical of the American Medical Association: "Every attempt that has been made by liberally minded groups to improve medical care and make it more accessible...the AMA has attacked with ever increasing truculence.... They forget perhaps that medicine is for the people, not for the doctors. They need some enlightenment on this point."

Crichton called the work "a highly selective and personal book, based on the idiosyncratic observation of one medical student wandering around a large institution, sticking his nose into this room or that, talking to some people and watching others and trying to decide what, if anything, it all means."

== Bibliography ==
- Crichton, Michael, Five Patients, Ballantine Books, ISBN 0-345-35464-8
