= Rising Sun (Crichton novel) =

1992 novel by Michael Crichton

- First edition cover
- Author: Michael Crichton
- Cover artist: Chip Kidd
- Language: English
- Genre: Crime thriller
- Publisher: Alfred A. Knopf
- Publication date: January 27, 1992
- Publication place: United States
- Media type: Hardcover, paperback
- Pages: 385
- ISBN: 0-394-58942-4
- OCLC: 24216739
- Dewey Decimal: 813/.54 20
- LC Class: PS3553.R48 R57 1992
- Preceded by: Jurassic Park
- Followed by: Disclosure

Rising Sun is a 1992 novel by Michael Crichton. It was his eighth under his own name and eighteenth overall, and is about a murder in the Los Angeles headquarters of a Japanese corporation. The book was published by Alfred A. Knopf, Inc. An image of fashion model Gia Carangi is incorporated in the cover art for the original edition.

Although a detective/murder mystery novel at first glance, Rising Sun deals with the controversial subject of Japanese-American relations, and questions the premise that foreign direct investment in the high-technology sectors of the United States is beneficial. Throughout the book, the differences between the Japanese and Western mindsets are highlighted, especially in the areas of business strategy and corporate culture.

The book is set in an unspecified future time when the process of a bloodless Japanese takeover of the US is far advanced: Japanese companies have altogether driven American ones out of whole branches of industry; Japanese technologies in virtually all fields are years ahead of American technologies and Americans see no hope of closing the gap.

== Plot summary ==
Nakamoto Corporation is celebrating the grand opening of its new headquarters, the Nakamoto Tower, in Downtown Los Angeles; the 45th floor of the building is awash with celebrities, dignitaries and local politicians. On the 46th floor, Cheryl Lynn Austin, 23, is found dead. Lieutenant Peter J. Smith, the Special Services Liaison officer for the Los Angeles Police Department (LAPD), is assigned to the case. He is joined, on request, by retired Captain John Connor, who has lived in Japan and is well-acquainted with Japanese culture.

Upon arriving at Nakamoto Tower, the two policemen learn from officer-in-charge Tom Graham that the Japanese, led by Nakamoto employee Ishiguro, are stalling the investigation by demanding that the liaison be present. Although they have a valid pretense in that the virulently racist Graham is threatening to disrupt the celebration, it is obvious to Connor that a cover-up is underway. The detectives realize that the tapes from the security cameras on the 46th floor have mysteriously disappeared, and the security guards are deliberately unhelpful. Smith and Connor visit the apartment of the late Ms. Austin, realizing that she was a mistress to a wealthy Japanese. It seems that Ms. Austin's home had been ransacked soon after her death. After several visits to friends and associates of Ms. Austin and Nakamoto, the two detectives find a suspect in Eddie Sakamura, a wealthy Japanese playboy from Kyoto. However, the two are inclined to release him, due to Eddie's previous associations with John Connor. Connor is still able to get Eddie to hand over his passport.

The two officers are summoned to witness Ms. Austin's autopsy; trace evidence strongly suggests a Japanese killer. Afterwards, Smith and Connor are approached by Ishiguro, who now presents them with seemingly authentic videos from the security cameras, which show Sakamura to be the murderer. Having solved the mystery, Connor returns home to rest, while Smith and Graham go to apprehend Sakamura. Upon arriving at Eddie's house, the two detectives are stalled by two naked women while Eddie escapes in a Ferrari. After a high-speed chase, Eddie's car crashes and bursts into flames, killing him.

The next day, the newspaper runs editorials criticizing Smith, Graham, and Connor's actions as racist and accuses them of police brutality. Soon afterward, Smith receives a phone call from the Chief of Police, declaring the investigation officially over. Smith isn't satisfied, and decides to take the tapes to the University of Southern California, in order to make copies. There, Smith meets Theresa Asakuma, a Japanese student who is an expert on computers and software manipulation. She is able to quickly point out that the tapes were indeed copies. After duplicating the tapes, Smith then picks up Connor after his golf game with several Japanese friends. On their way back to the USC labs, the two detectives are offered lucrative bribes from the Japanese, including a membership at an expensive golf club and extremely low-priced real estate offers. They visit and consult with companies and industries involved with Nakamoto, in order to learn more about the killer's motives. Along the way, they realize that they are only pawns in a much larger political and economic "war" between America and Japan, and how much the United States relies on Japan, which dominates the American electronics industry. Throughout the investigation, Connor educates Smith about the vast cultural differences between Japan and America, as well as the various underhanded business tactics Japan uses to maintain their technological edge over America.

Finally, they meet with U.S. Senator John Morton, a potential presidential candidate in the upcoming elections. They learn that Morton fiercely opposes the Japanese purchase of MicroCon, a small Silicon Valley company that manufactures machinery. At USC, Smith and Theresa deduce that Eddie had been set up by the Japanese who had altered the tapes and inserted Eddie's image in them. They undo the changes, discovering that Senator Morton was apparently the real killer and Eddie had been a witness. Connor and Smith return to Smith's apartment, where they discover Eddie Sakamura, alive; the man who had actually been killed was a Japanese security officer named Tanaka who had been in Eddie's garage, searching for the tapes, before panicking and fleeing in Eddie's car, which led to his death. The trio then confront Senator Morton, who confesses to his role in Cheryl Austin's death. The senator then shoots himself in a bathroom. Soon afterward, an angry Ishiguro arrives to confront Eddie and the two detectives, making subtle threats to their lives. Strangely, Eddie reacts calmly, leading Connor to conclude afterward that Eddie still possesses an original copy of the tape from the security cameras. Smith and Connor then travel to Eddie's home, where they find him tortured to death for the location of the stolen tape. Connor drops Smith off at his home.

Upon entering his apartment, Smith realizes that Eddie had left the tape there. Ishiguro's men arrive; he quickly orders his babysitter to hide his daughter and herself in the upstairs bedroom. Connor sneaks back to Smith's apartment, carrying a bulletproof vest. The two detectives then engage in a gun battle with the thugs, and Smith is shot in the back, although his vest saves his life.

The next day, the two watch the tape that Eddie had left behind; Austin was still alive after being strangled by Morton in an act of sexual pleasure, but deliberately murdered by Ishiguro after Morton and Eddie left. They go to the Nakamoto Tower to apprehend Ishiguro during an important meeting; Connor radios the police dispatcher knowing that the Japanese are monitoring the frequency and will be prepared for the arrest. The detectives show the tape of the murder to the meeting attendees; when Ishiguro sees that the senior Japanese executives have all left the meeting room he commits suicide by jumping off the building. Having solved the mystery, Connor answers Smith's questions before dropping him off at his apartment. The story then concludes with Smith's statements about America's future with Japan and the observation that no one seems to be taking the potential threats seriously.

== Characters ==
- Lieutenant Peter J. Smith — LAPD Special Services Officer assigned to this case as a liaison with the Asian community. He is a divorced father with a two-year-old daughter named Michelle.
- Lieutenant Tom Graham — LAPD Homicide detective in charge of investigating a murder at the opening party for the new Nakamoto Tower in downtown LA. Calls in Smith for assistance in his capacity as Special Services Officer. Racially prejudiced against the Japanese.
- Fred Hoffmann — watch commander at DHD downtown. Suggests that Smith get the assistance of semi-retired, former Special Services Officer Captain John Conner.
- Captain John Connor — Semi-retired officer, on indefinite leave. Was the first SSO (liaison) with LAPD. Lived for a time in Japan and is an expert on Japanese culture and business practices. The Japanese executives are wary of him because they know he speaks Japanese and understands the nuances of Japanese culture.
- Cheryl Lynn Austin — The murder victim. A Texas-born prostitute, party girl and one-time model in Japan.
- Akira Tanaka — An officer of Nakamoto Security.
- Masao Ishiguro — A junior executive of the Nakamoto Corporation and liaison between Nakamoto and LAPD regarding the murder.
- Eddie Sakamura — A wealthy Japanese playboy, sometimes pimp, son of a wealthy man in Japan, small-time drug dealer, and promoter of the interests of his father's business empire in Japan.
- Ellen Farley — Assistant to the Mayor, whom Pete Smith has been dating recently.
- Jerome Phillips — Nakamoto Security guard on duty at the time of the investigation.
- Ted Cole — Nakamoto Security guard.
- Sen. John Morton — Senator who protests the Japanese industries' influence in America.
- Yoshida — CEO of Akai Ceramics America, a Nakamoto subsidiary, which is looking to buy MicroCon.
- Bob Richmond — Counsel to Akai and Nakamoto, a former assistant to the U.S. Trade Representative in Japan.
- Theresa Asakuma — Japanese-American graduate student of Professor Sanders and an expert in imaging technology. Born of a Black American father and a Japanese mother, she suffered harsh prejudice as a child in Hokkaido, which left her bitter towards Japan.
- Professor Sanders — An imaging specialist.
- Willy "The Weasel" Wilhelm — an unethical reporter covering the case.
- Lauren Davis — Smith's former wife and mother of his daughter. Works for the District Attorney.
- Elaine — Michelle's nanny.

The names Iwabuchi, Moriyama, Shirai (for some of the executives in the Nakamoto boardroom) and Koichi Nishi (a pseudonym Eddie Sakamura used to aid the police) are taken from the movie The Bad Sleep Well, which is later mentioned by Connor, though not by title.

== Adaptations ==
Random House abridged the novel into an audiobook read by Keith Szarabajka, which ran approximately three hours. The book was adapted into a film, the 1993 release Rising Sun starring Sean Connery as Connor, Wesley Snipes as Smith, Tia Carrere as Asakuma and Harvey Keitel as Graham. Several changes were made in adapting the story for the film. Caucasian Peter Smith was changed to African-American Webster ("Webb") Smith, Ishiguro became Ishihara, and Theresa became Jingo. Additionally, the identity of the murderer was changed from Ishiguro/Ishihara to Bob Richmond, and reflected in the solution to the film. The film received mixed reviews from critics but was a commercial success, grossing over $107 million worldwide.

== Reception ==
Reviews for the novel were mixed, owing mostly to the controversial subject matter. The New York Times's Christopher Lehmann-Haupt gave the novel a mixed review, saying, "The trouble with Rising Sun is obviously that as a serious discourse on why we should begin waging economic war against Japan, the book is far too entertaining. And as an entertainment, it is far too didactic."

The Chicago Sun-Times wrote "Though Michael Crichton knew Rising Sun would ruffle feathers, the vehemence of the reaction came as a surprise. Challenges to his economic premise - that the United States is selling its future to Japan - failed to materialize. Instead, he recalls with obvious annoyance, American critics labelled him racist."

In Crichton's Associated Press obituary his rebuttal to the criticism of Rising Sun was quoted, saying "because I'm always trying to deal with data, I went on a tour talking about it and gave a very careful argument, and their response came back, 'Well you say that but we know you're a racist.'" Furthermore, Crichton has gone on record as saying that he intended his novel to be a "wakeup call" to U.S. industry and that he is more critical of the United States than Japan. According to activist Guy Aoki "if that was his intention, he failed miserably," and "what you had instead was every character going on for pages about how unfair Japanese business practices are [...] the book was a very one-sided view of what the Japanese are doing, saying that there's reason to not trust them and not like them."

== See also ==
- Anti-Japanese sentiment
