= Rising Sun (1993 film) =

- Theatrical release poster
- Directed by: Philip Kaufman
- Screenplay by: Michael Crichton; Philip Kaufman; Michael Backes
- Based on: Rising Sun by Michael Crichton
- Produced by: Peter Kaufman
- Starring: Sean Connery; Wesley Snipes; Harvey Keitel; Cary-Hiroyuki Tagawa; Kevin Anderson; Mako; Tia Carrere; Ray Wise; Stan Shaw
- Cinematography: Michael Chapman
- Edited by: William S. Scharf; Stephen A. Rotter
- Music by: Tōru Takemitsu
- Distributed by: 20th Century Fox
- Release date: July 30, 1993
- Running time: 125 minutes
- Country: United States
- Languages: English; Japanese
- Budget: $40 million
- Box office: $107.2 million

Rising Sun is a 1993 American thriller film directed by Philip Kaufman and written by Kaufman, Michael Crichton and Michael Backes. It stars Sean Connery (who was also an executive producer), Wesley Snipes, Harvey Keitel, Tia Carrere, Mako and Cary-Hiroyuki Tagawa. It is based on Michael Crichton's 1992 novel Rising Sun. Rising Sun was released by 20th Century Fox on July 30, 1993. It received negative reviews and grossed $107.2 million on a $40 million budget.

== Plot ==
During a commencement gala at the newly opened Los Angeles headquarters of Nakamoto, a Japanese keiretsu, a call girl, Cheryl Lynn Austin, is strangled while having rough sex on the boardroom table. LAPD Lieutenant Webster "Web" Smith and John Connor, a former police captain and expert on Japanese affairs, are sent to act as liaison between the Japanese executives and the investigating officer, Smith's former partner Tom Graham. During the initial investigation, Connor and Smith review surveillance camera footage, and realize that one of the discs is missing.

Smith and Connor suspect Eddie Sakamura, Cheryl's boyfriend and agent of a Nakamoto rival, of killing her, and interrogate him at a house party. Sakamura promises to bring Connor something, and Connor reluctantly lets him go after confiscating his passport. Ishihara, a Nakamoto employee whom Connor had previously interrogated, delivers the missing disc, which clearly shows Sakamura having sex with Cheryl and strangling her. Graham and Smith lead a SWAT raid on Sakamura's house. He tries to flee in a Vector W8 sports car, but crashes and is killed.

Smith learns that Sakamura had attempted to contact him about the missing disc, so he and Connor take the disc to an expert, Jingo Asakuma, who reveals that the disc has been digitally altered to implicate Sakamura.

Nakamoto is in the midst of sensitive negotiations for the acquisition of an American semiconductor company, with Senator John Morton, a guest at the party, abruptly changing his stance on a bill that would prevent the merger from going through. Suspecting his sudden shift is somehow related to the murder, Connor and Smith attempt to interview him at his campaign office, but without success. Upon returning to Smith's apartment, the duo find Sakamura alive and well. He reveals that he was being tailed that day by Tanaka, a Nakamoto security agent attempting to locate the original disc. Not wanting to be seen with Sakamura, Tanaka stole his sports car and committed suicide by crashing it. Sakamura gives Connor the original disc, but before he can leave, Lt. Graham arrives with Ishihara. Sakamura is killed fighting off Ishihara's men, and Smith is shot and left for dead, surviving only thanks to a bulletproof vest.

After being interrogated, Smith is put on paid leave due to an ongoing investigation of an earlier corruption charge. Regrouping with Connor and Jingo, the three view the original surveillance footage, which shows Senator Morton having sex with Cheryl and performing erotic asphyxiation on her. Falsely believing he killed her, Morton changes his position on the regulation bill to stay in Nakamoto's good graces. After leaving the boardroom, the footage shows another figure approaching and killing Cheryl by strangulation.

Hoping to draw the killer out, Connor and Smith fax Morton stills of the footage showing his involvement in the murder. Morton contacts Ishihara, revealing the executive to be in on the cover-up, and then Morton commits suicide. Connor, Smith, and Jingo interrupt the merger negotiations to show Nakamoto President Yoshida the surveillance footage. Bob Richmond, an American lawyer working for Nakamoto, reveals that he is the real killer and tries to run away, only to be killed by Eddie Sakamura's yakuza friends.

Yoshida maintains his and his colleagues' innocence, quietly exiling Ishihara to a desk job back in Japan. Smith drives Jingo home, where she casts doubt on whether Richmond was really the murderer, or if he was simply taking the fall to protect someone higher up in the company.

== Cast ==
- Sean Connery as Captain John Connor
- Wesley Snipes as Lieutenant Webster "Web" Smith
- Harvey Keitel as Lieutenant Tom Graham
- Cary-Hiroyuki Tagawa as Eddie Sakamura
- Kevin Anderson as Bob Richmond
- Mako as Mr. Yoshida
- Ray Wise as Senator John Morton
- Stan Egi as Masao Ishihara
- Stan Shaw as Phillips
- Tia Carrere as Jingo Asakuma
- Steve Buscemi as Willy "The Weasel" Wilhelm
- Tatjana Patitz as Cheryl Lynn Austin
- Tylyn John as Redhead Mistress of Eddie Sakamura
- Peter Crombie as Greg
- Sam Lloyd as Rick
- Alexandra Powers as Julia
- Daniel Von Bargen as Chief Olson / Interrogator
- Lauren Robinson as Zelly Smith
- Amy Hill as Hsieh
- Tom Dahlgren as Jim Donaldson
- Clyde Kusatsu as Shoji Tanaka
- Michael Chapman as Fred Hoffman
- Joey Miyashima and Nelson Mashita as Young Japanese Negotiators
- Tamara Tunie as Lauren
- Tony Ganios as Perry, The Doorman Guard

== Production ==
Michael Crichton was paid $1 million for the filming rights of his novel, and was also attached to write the screenplay alongside Michael Backes. After delivering a faithful draft, studio 20th Century Fox asked for a rewrite. Crichton then entered disputes with director Philip Kaufman, who asked for five separate rewrites. Crichton also was not in favor of the decision by Kaufman and Joe Roth to cast Wesley Snipes as the protagonist, therefore changing the character's race from Caucasian to African-American. Crichton argued: "In a movie about U.S.-Japan relations, if you cast someone who’s black, you introduce another aspect because of tension between blacks and Japanese."

Kaufman wound up taking the writing duties, with David Mamet also delivering a draft. Kaufman tried to get a sole screenwriter credit, but the Writer's Guild arbitration decided that his contributions were not enough to deny a credit to Crichton and Backes. Given Kaufman had a tendency for long films, Fox made him contractually obligated to deliver a two-hour length film, with editing delays pushing the release date forward. Rising Sun was filmed entirely in Los Angeles, California, between June and October 1992.

== Reception ==
=== Box office ===
Rising Sun was released on 30 July 1993 in 1,510 theaters across the US. It grossed $15,195,941 (24.1% of total gross) on its opening weekend. During its run in theaters, the film grossed $63,179,523 (58.9%) in the US and $44,019,267 (41.1%) overseas for a worldwide total of $107,198,790. The film spent six weeks in the Top 10.

=== Critical response ===
On review aggregator website Rotten Tomatoes, Rising Sun has a 32% approval rating based on 41 reviews, with an average ranking of 5/10. On Metacritic, it has a rank of 56 out of a 100 based on 24 critics, indicating "mixed or average reviews". Audiences polled by CinemaScore gave the film an average grade of "B" on an A+ to F scale.

Owen Gleiberman of the Entertainment Weekly awarded the film with "C+" grade. Richard Schickel of Time wrote: "The bestseller's passions were misplaced, but in toning them down, the adaptation turns bland." Stanley Kauffmann of The New Republic called Rising Sun "a supposed thriller about Japanese corporate skullduggery in L.A. that zigzags and crosses its own trail so often that it's dizzyingly tedious long before the end." The film attracted controversy and protest from Asian-Americans, including Guy Aoki and other representatives of the Media Action Network for Asian Americans, who felt the film demonized Asian people.
