= Eaters of the Dead =

Novel by Michael Crichton

- First edition cover
- Author: Michael Crichton
- Cover artist: Paul Bacon
- Language: English
- Genre: Historical novel
- Publisher: Knopf
- Publication date: March 1976
- Publication place: United States
- Pages: 288
- ISBN: 0-394-49400-8
- OCLC: 1959473
- Dewey Decimal: 813/.5/4
- LC Class: PZ4.C9178 Eat3 PS3553.R48
- Preceded by: The Great Train Robbery
- Followed by: Congo

Eaters of the Dead: The Manuscript of Ibn Fadlan Relating His Experiences with the Northmen in AD 922 (later republished as The 13th Warrior to correspond with the film adaptation of the novel) is a 1976 novel by Michael Crichton, the fourth novel under his own name and his 14th overall. The story is about a 10th-century Muslim Arab who travels with a group of Vikings to their settlement.

Crichton explains in an appendix that the book was based on two sources. The first three chapters are a retelling of Ahmad ibn Fadlan's personal account of his actual journey north and his experiences with and observations of Varangians. The remainder is a retelling of Beowulf.

== Plot summary ==
The novel is set in the 10th century. The Caliph of Baghdad, Al-Muqtadir, sends his ambassador, Ahmad ibn Fadlan, on a mission to assist the king of the Volga Bulgars. Ahmad ibn Fadlan never arrives, as he is conscripted by a group of Vikings, led by their chieftain Buliwyf, to take part in a hero's quest to the north; he is taken along as the 13th member of their group to comply with a soothsayer's requirement for success. They travel to Hurot Hall, the home of King Hrothgar, to defend it from the 'mist-monsters', or 'wendol', a tribe of vicious savages (suggested by the narrator to have been possibly relict Neanderthals) who go to battle wearing bearskins. After two devastating battles, Ibn Fadlan and the remaining Northmen decide to attack the Wendol village, which is located in a network of sea caves. They infiltrate the sea caves, assassinate the head of the Wendol tribe, and return to Hurot Hall. Buliwyf, however, is mortally wounded in the attempt. At Hurot, they encounter the Wendol in battle for a final time, defeating them. Ibn Fadlan is then allowed to continue on his journey.

Eaters of the Dead is narrated as a scientific commentary on an old manuscript. The narrator describes the story as a composite of extant commentaries and translations of the original storyteller's manuscript. The narration makes several references to a possible change or mistranslation of the original story by later copiers. The story is told by several different voices: the editor/narrator, the translators of the script, and the original author, Ahmad ibn Fadlan, who also relates stories told by others. A sense of authenticity is supported by occasional explanatory footnotes with references to a mixture of factual and fictitious sources.

== Sources and inspiration ==
In the afterword, Crichton gives a few comments on the book's origin. A good friend of Crichton's was giving a lecture on the "Bores of Literature". Included in his lecture was an argument on Beowulf and why it was simply uninteresting. Crichton opined that the story was not a bore but was, in fact, a very interesting work. The argument escalated until Crichton stated that he would prove to him that the story could be interesting if presented in the correct way.

Abdul Alḥaẓred's Necronomicon (of H. P. Lovecraft fame) is mentioned in passing as a reference.

== Reception ==
The critic from the New York Times called it "diverting but disappointing". The Chicago Tribune said it was "funny, fascinating and informative".

== Film adaptation ==
In 1979, it was announced the movie version of the novel would be made by the newly formed Orion Pictures with Crichton as director. This did not occur.

The novel was adapted into film as The 13th Warrior (1999), directed by John McTiernan and released by Walt Disney Pictures through its Touchstone Pictures banner. Crichton did some uncredited directing for a reshoot after Disney fired McTiernan for various reasons, one of which was going far over budget. Antonio Banderas played Ibn Fadlan. Crichton writes that he was "quite pleased" with the film, although it received mixed reviews and performed poorly at the box office, earning about $62 million worldwide; the film's budget was more than $100 million.

== Bibliography ==
- Crichton, Michael. "A Factual Note on Eaters of the Dead" in Eaters of the Dead. New York: Harper, 2006. 245–52. ISBN 9780061782633.
