= Eruption (novel) =

2024 novel by Michael Crichton and James Patterson

- First edition cover
- Author: Michael Crichton; James Patterson
- Language: English
- Genre: Techno-thriller
- Publisher: Little, Brown and Company
- Publication date: June 3, 2024
- Publication place: United States
- Media type: Print (hardcover and paperback)
- Pages: 432
- ISBN: 0-316-56507-5

Eruption is a 2024 novel by Michael Crichton and James Patterson, based on a manuscript by Crichton that was unfinished at the time of his death. It is Crichton's 29th novel, the nineteenth under his own name and the fourth to be published posthumously. A thriller about an eruption of Mauna Loa on the island of Hawaii, the novel was completed by Patterson years after Crichton's death, at the behest of his widow Sherri.

== Film adaptation ==
In June 2024, it was reported that Steven Spielberg was in talks with Sherri Crichton about a possible film adaptation. That same month, Jimmy Chin and Elizabeth Chai Vasarhelyi signed on to direct the adaptation. One month later, Sony made a seven-figure deal at a rights auction for the film. In July 2025, Kaz and Ryan Firpo were hired to write the screenplay, while Chin and Vasarhelyi had left the film.
