= Travels (book) =

1988 nonfiction book by Michael Crichton

- First edition
- Author: Michael Crichton
- Language: English
- Publisher: Alfred A. Knopf
- Publication date: 1988
- Publication place: United States
- Media type: Print (Hardcover)
- Pages: 377
- ISBN: 0-394-56236-4
- OCLC: 17550457
- Dewey Decimal: 813/.54 B 19
- LC Class: PS3553.R48 Z476 1988
- Preceded by: Electronic Life

Travels is a 1988 nonfiction book by Michael Crichton that focuses on his travels, both physical and spiritual, including out-of-body experiences, astral projection, and fortune-telling. It also tells of his time at Harvard Medical School.

According to Crichton, he first had the idea of the book in 1981 but did not start writing it until January 1986. It was his most autobiographical work.

Newsday wrote "Crichton's tales are written in a light, easy to read, anecdotal style."
