= Michael Crichton =

American author and filmmaker (1942–2008)

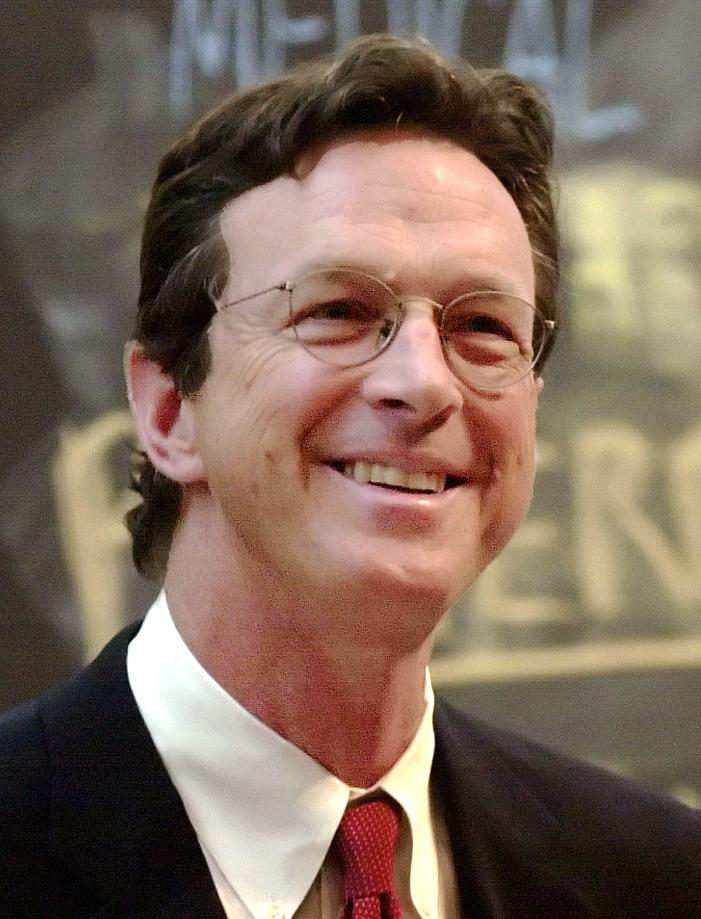
- Crichton at Harvard University in 2002
- Born: John Michael Crichton; October 23, 1942; Chicago, Illinois, U.S.
- Died: November 4, 2008 (aged 66); Los Angeles, California, U.S.
- Education: Harvard University (BA, MD)
- Occupations: Author; screenwriter; director; producer
- Spouses: Joan Radam (m. 1965; div. 1970) Kathy St. Johns (m. 1978; div. 1980) Suzanne Childs (m. 1981; div. 1983) Anne-Marie Martin (m. 1987; div. 2003) Sherri Alexander (m. 2005)
- Children: 2
- Writing career
- Pen name: John Lange; Jeffrey Hudson; Michael Douglas
- Period: 1959–2008
- Genres: Action, adventure, science fiction, techno-thriller, historical fiction, drama
- Notable work: The Andromeda Strain, Jurassic Park
- Website: michaelcrichton.com

John Michael Crichton (/ˈkraɪtən/ KRY-tən; October 23, 1942 – November 4, 2008) was an American author and filmmaker. His books have sold over 200 million copies worldwide, and over a dozen have been adapted into films. His literary works heavily feature technology and are usually within the science fiction, techno-thriller, and medical fiction genres. Crichton's novels often explore human technological advancement and attempted dominance over nature, both with frequently catastrophic results; many of his works are cautionary tales, especially regarding themes of biotechnology. Several of his stories center on themes of genetic modification, hybridization, paleontology and/or zoology. Many feature medical or scientific underpinnings, reflective of his own medical background.

Crichton received an MD from Harvard Medical School in 1969 but did not practice medicine, choosing to focus on his writing instead. Initially writing under a pseudonym, he eventually published 25 novels in his lifetime, including: The Andromeda Strain (1969), The Terminal Man (1972), The Great Train Robbery (1975), Congo (1980), Sphere (1987), Jurassic Park (1990), Rising Sun (1992), Disclosure (1994), The Lost World (1995), Airframe (1996), Timeline (1999), Prey (2002), State of Fear (2004), and Next (2006). Four more novels, in various states of completion, were published after his death in 2008.

Crichton was also involved in the film and television industry. In 1973, he wrote and directed Westworld, the first film to use 2D computer-generated imagery. He also directed Coma (1978), The First Great Train Robbery (1978), Looker (1981), Runaway (1984), and Physical Evidence (1989). He was the creator of the television series ER (1994–2009), and several of his novels were adapted into films, most notably the Jurassic Park franchise.

== Life ==
=== Early life ===
John Michael Crichton was born on October 23, 1942, in Chicago, Illinois, to John Henderson Crichton, a journalist, and Zula Miller Crichton, a homemaker. He was raised on Long Island, in Roslyn, New York, and he showed a keen interest in writing from a young age; at 16, he had an article about a trip he took to Sunset Crater published in The New York Times. Crichton later recalled, "Roslyn was another world. Looking back, it's remarkable what wasn't going on. There was no terror. No fear of children being abused. No fear of random murder. No drug use we knew about. I walked to school. I rode my bike for miles and miles, to the movie on Main Street and piano lessons and the like. Kids had freedom. It wasn't such a dangerous world... We studied our butts off, and we got a tremendously good education there."

Crichton had always planned on becoming a writer and began his studies at Harvard University in 1960 as an English major. During his freshman year, he conducted an experiment to expose a professor who he believed was giving him abnormally low marks and criticizing his literary style. Informing another professor of his suspicions, Crichton submitted an essay by George Orwell under his own name. The paper was returned by his unwitting professor with a mark of "B−". He later said, "Now Orwell was a wonderful writer, and if a B-minus was all he could get, I thought I'd better drop English as my major." His differences with the English department and a desire to gain a more scientifically grounded education led Crichton to switch his major to biological anthropology. He graduated with a Bachelor of Arts summa cum laude in 1964, and was initiated into Phi Beta Kappa society.

Crichton received a Henry Russell Shaw Traveling Fellowship from 1964 to 1965, which allowed him to serve as a visiting lecturer in anthropology at the University of Cambridge in the United Kingdom. Crichton later enrolled at Harvard Medical School. Crichton later said "about two weeks into medical school I realized I hated it. This isn't unusual since everyone hates medical school – even happy, practicing physicians."

=== Pseudonymous novels (1965–1968) ===
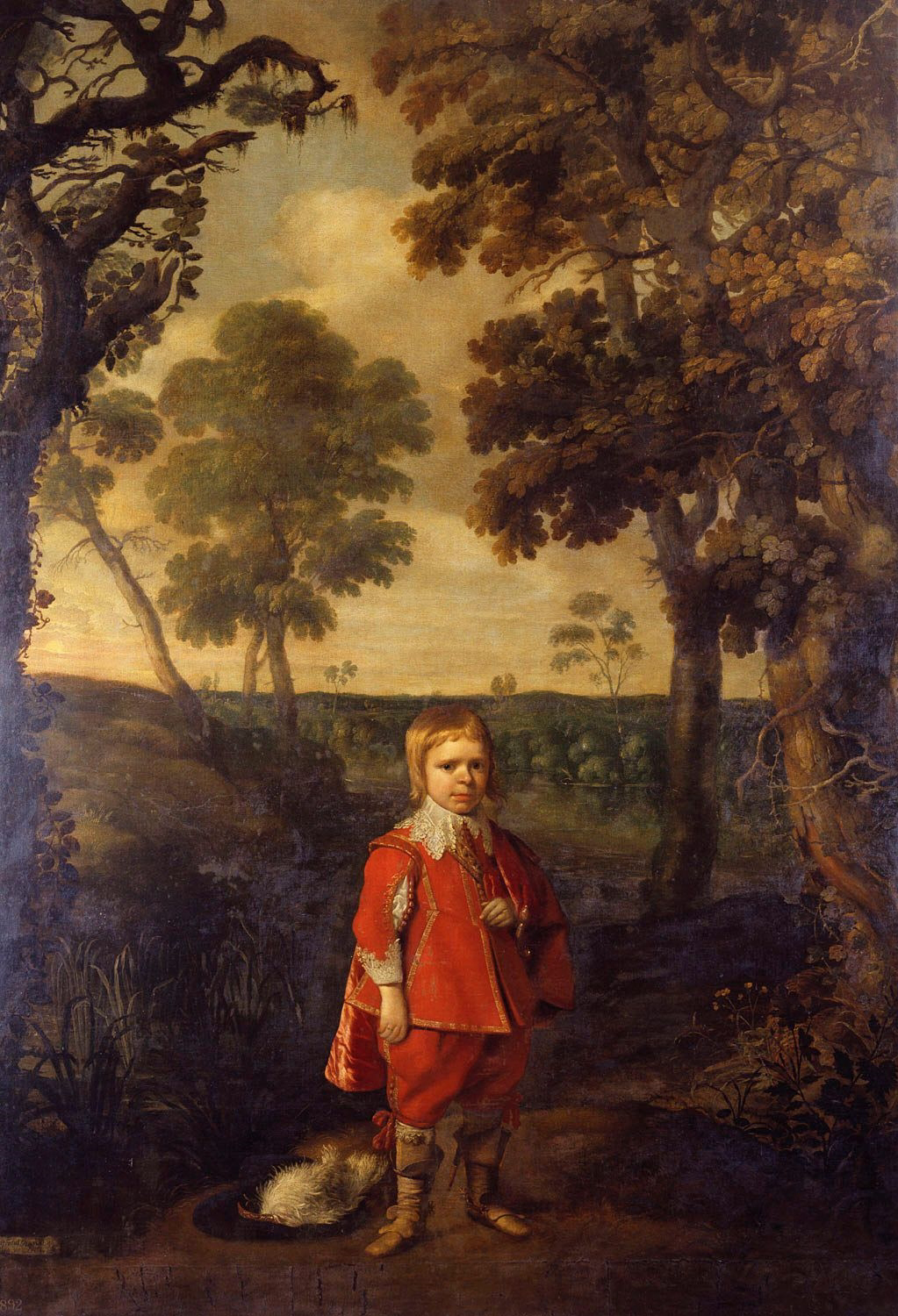
Crichton used the pen-name "Jeffrey Hudson", a reference to a 17th-century court dwarf and his own "abnormal" height of six feet and nine inches.

In 1965, while at Harvard Medical School, Crichton wrote a novel, Odds On. "I wrote for furniture and groceries", he said later. Odds On is a 215-page paperback novel which describes an attempted robbery at an isolated hotel on the Costa Brava in Spain. The robbery is planned scientifically with the help of a critical path analysis computer program, but unforeseen events get in the way. Crichton submitted it to Doubleday, where a reader liked it but felt it was not for the company. Doubleday passed it on to New American Library, which published it in 1966. Crichton used the pen name John Lange because he planned to become a doctor and did not want his patients to worry that he would use them for his plots. The name came from cultural anthropologist Andrew Lang. Crichton added an "e" to the surname and substituted his own real first name, John, for Andrew. The novel was successful enough to lead to a series of John Lange novels. Film rights were sold in 1969, but no movie resulted.

The second Lange novel, Scratch One (1967), relates the story of Roger Carr, a handsome, charming, privileged man who practices law, more as a means to support his playboy lifestyle than a career. Carr is sent to Nice, France, where he has notable political connections, but is mistaken for an assassin and finds his life in jeopardy. Crichton wrote the book while traveling through Europe on a travel fellowship. He visited the Cannes Film Festival and Monaco Grand Prix, and then decided, "any idiot should be able to write a potboiler set in Cannes and Monaco", and wrote it in eleven days. He later described the book as "no good". His third John Lange novel, Easy Go (1968), is the story of Harold Barnaby, a brilliant Egyptologist who discovers a concealed message while translating hieroglyphics informing him of an unnamed pharaoh whose tomb is yet to be discovered. Crichton said the book earned him $1,500 (equivalent to $13,888 in 2025). Crichton later said: "My feeling about the Lange books is that my competition is in-flight movies. One can read the books in an hour and a half, and be more satisfactorily amused than watching Doris Day. I write them fast and the reader reads them fast and I get things off my back."

Crichton's fourth novel was A Case of Need (1968), a medical thriller. The novel had a different tone from the Lange books; accordingly, Crichton used the pen name "Jeffery Hudson", based on Sir Jeffrey Hudson, a 17th-century dwarf in the court of queen consort Henrietta Maria of England. The novel would prove a turning point in Crichton's future novels, in which technology is important in the subject matter, although this novel was as much about medical practice. The novel earned him an Edgar Award in 1969. He intended to use the "Jeffery Hudson" pseudonym for other medical novels but ended up using it only once. The book was later adapted into the film The Carey Treatment (1972).

=== Early novels and screenplays (1969–1974) ===
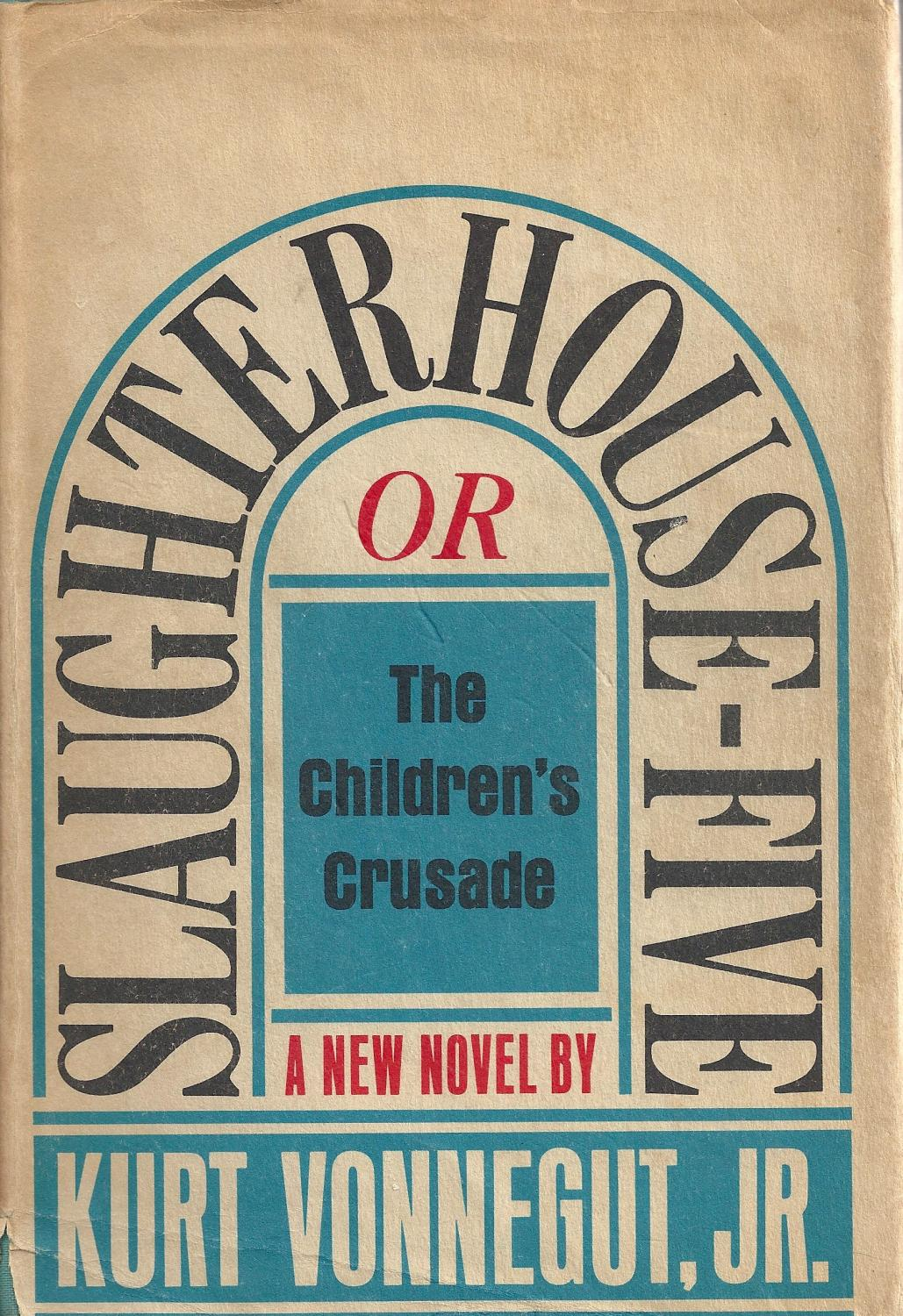
Crichton reviewed Kurt Vonnegut's Slaughterhouse-Five (1969) in The New Republic.

Crichton says after he finished his third year of medical school: "I stopped believing that one day I'd love it and realized that what I loved was writing." He began publishing book reviews under his name. In 1969, Crichton wrote a review for The New Republic (as J. Michael Crichton), reviewing Kurt Vonnegut's recently published Slaughterhouse-Five. He also continued to write Lange novels: Zero Cool (1969), dealt with an American radiologist on vacation in Spain who is caught in a murderous crossfire between rival gangs seeking a precious artifact. The Venom Business (1969) relates the story of a smuggler who uses his exceptional skill as a snake handler to his advantage by importing snakes to be used by drug companies and universities for medical research.

The first novel that was published under Crichton's name was The Andromeda Strain (1969), which proved to be the most important novel of his career and established him as a bestselling author. The novel documents the efforts of a team of scientists investigating an extraterrestrial microorganism that clots human blood, causing death within two minutes. Crichton was inspired to write it after reading The IPCRESS File by Len Deighton while studying in England. Crichton says he was "terrifically impressed" by the book – "a lot of Andromeda is traceable to Ipcress in terms of trying to create an imaginary world using recognizable techniques and real people." He wrote the novel over three years. The novel became an instant hit, and film rights were sold for $250,000. It was adapted into a 1971 film by director Robert Wise.

During his clinical rotations at the Boston City Hospital, Crichton grew disenchanted with the culture there, which appeared to emphasize the interests and reputations of doctors over the interests of patients. He graduated from Harvard, obtaining an MD in 1969, and undertook a post-doctoral fellowship study at the Salk Institute for Biological Studies in La Jolla, California, from 1969 to 1970. He never obtained a license to practice medicine, devoting himself to his writing career instead. Reflecting on his career in medicine years later, Crichton concluded that patients too often shunned responsibility for their own health, relying on doctors as miracle workers rather than advisors. He experimented with astral projection, aura viewing, and clairvoyance, coming to believe that these included real phenomena that scientists had too eagerly dismissed as paranormal.

Three more Crichton books under pseudonyms were published in 1970. Two were Lange novels, Drug of Choice and Grave Descend. Grave Descend earned him an Edgar Award nomination the following year. There was also Dealing: or the Berkeley-to-Boston Forty-Brick Lost-Bag Blues written with his younger brother Douglas Crichton. Dealing was written under the pen name "Michael Douglas", using their first names. Michael Crichton wrote it "completely from beginning to end". Then his brother rewrote it from beginning to end, and then Crichton rewrote it again. This novel was made into a movie in 1972. Around this time Crichton also wrote and sold an original film script, Morton's Run. He also wrote the screenplay Lucifer Harkness in Darkness.

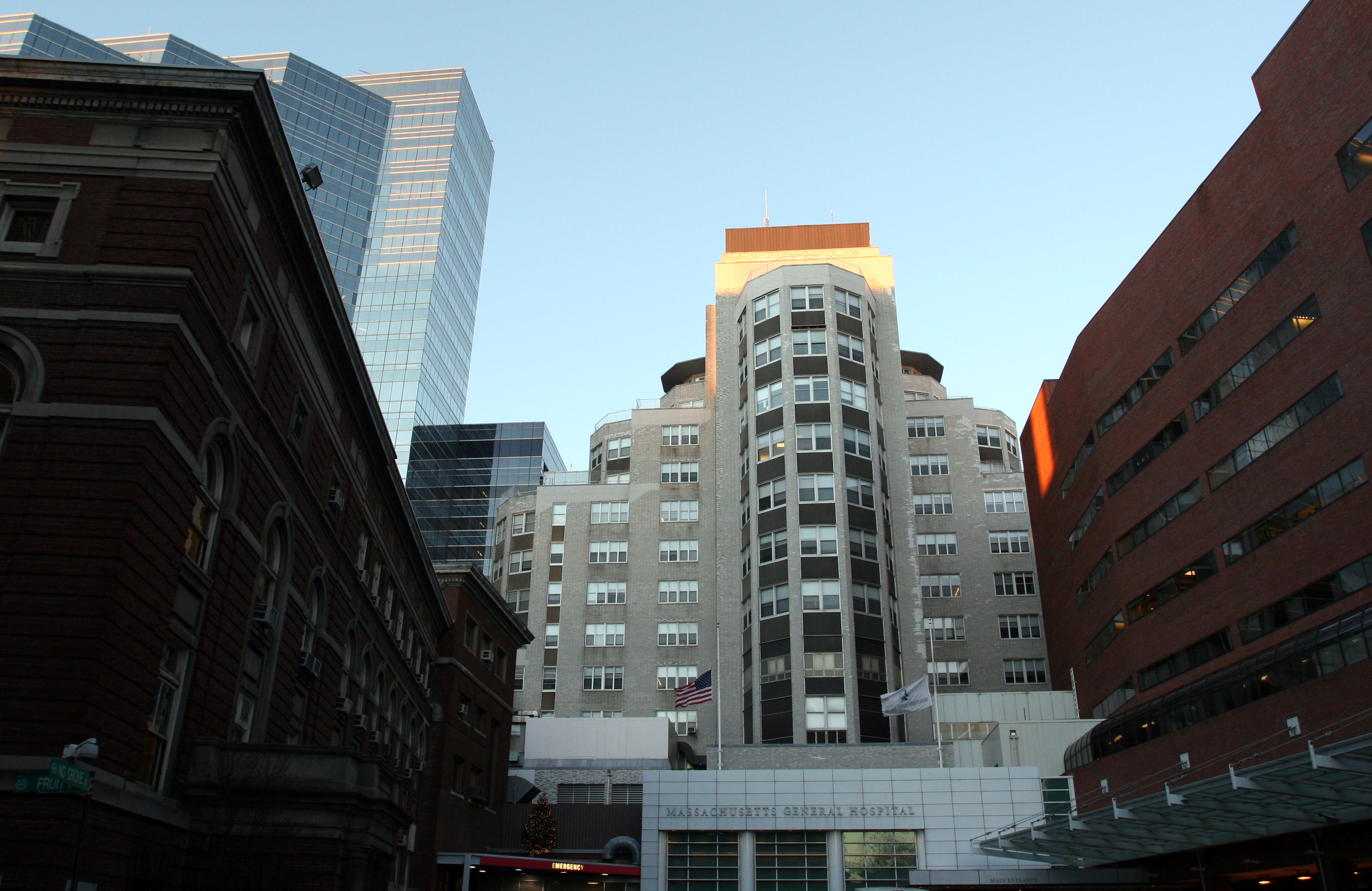
Crichton's first published book of non-fiction, Five Patients, recounts his experiences of practices in the late 1960s at Massachusetts General Hospital and the issues of costs and politics within American health care.

Aside from fiction, Crichton wrote several other books based on medical or scientific themes, often based upon his own observations in his field of expertise. In 1970, he published Five Patients, which recounts his experiences of hospital practices in the late 1960s at Massachusetts General Hospital in Boston. The book follows each of five patients through their hospital experience and the context of their treatment, revealing inadequacies in the hospital institution at the time. The book relates the experiences of Ralph Orlando, a construction worker seriously injured in a scaffold collapse; John O'Connor, a middle-aged dispatcher suffering from fever that has reduced him to a delirious wreck; Peter Luchesi, a young man who severs his hand in an accident; Sylvia Thompson, an airline passenger who suffers chest pains; and Edith Murphy, a mother of three who is diagnosed with a life-threatening disease. In Five Patients, Crichton examines a brief history of medicine up to 1969 to help place hospital culture and practice into context, and addresses the costs and politics of American healthcare. In 1974, he wrote a pilot script for a medical series, "24 Hours", based on his book Five Patients, however, networks were not enthusiastic.

As a personal friend of the artist Jasper Johns, Crichton compiled many of Johns' works in a coffee table book, published as Jasper Johns. It was originally published in 1970 by Harry N. Abrams, Inc. in association with the Whitney Museum of American Art and again in January 1977, with a second revised edition published in 1994. The psychiatrist Janet Ross owned a copy of the painting Numbers by Jasper Johns in Crichton's later novel The Terminal Man. The technophobic antagonist of the story found it odd that a person would paint numbers as they were inorganic. In 1972, Crichton published his last novel as John Lange: Binary, relates the story of a villainous middle-class businessman, who attempts to assassinate the President of the United States by stealing an army shipment of the two precursor chemicals that form a deadly nerve agent.

The Terminal Man (1972), is about a psychomotor epileptic sufferer, Harry Benson, who regularly suffers seizures followed by blackouts, and conducts himself inappropriately during seizures, waking up hours later with no knowledge of what he has done. Believed to be psychotic, he is investigated and electrodes are implanted in his brain. The book continued the preoccupation in Crichton's novels with machine-human interaction and technology. The novel was adapted into a 1974 film directed by Mike Hodges and starring George Segal. Crichton was hired to adapt his novel The Terminal Man into a script by Warner Bros. The studio felt he had departed from the source material too much and had another writer adapt it for the 1974 film. ABC TV wanted to buy the film rights to Crichton's novel Binary. The author agreed on the provision that he could direct the film. ABC agreed provided someone other than Crichton write the script. The result, Pursuit (1972) was a ratings success. Crichton then wrote and directed the 1973 low-budget science fiction western-thriller film Westworld about robots that run amok, which was his feature film directorial debut. It was the first feature film using 2D computer-generated imagery (CGI). The producer of Westworld hired Crichton to write an original script, which became the erotic thriller Extreme Close-Up (1973). Directed by Jeannot Szwarc, the movie disappointed Crichton.

=== Period novels and directing (1975–1988) ===
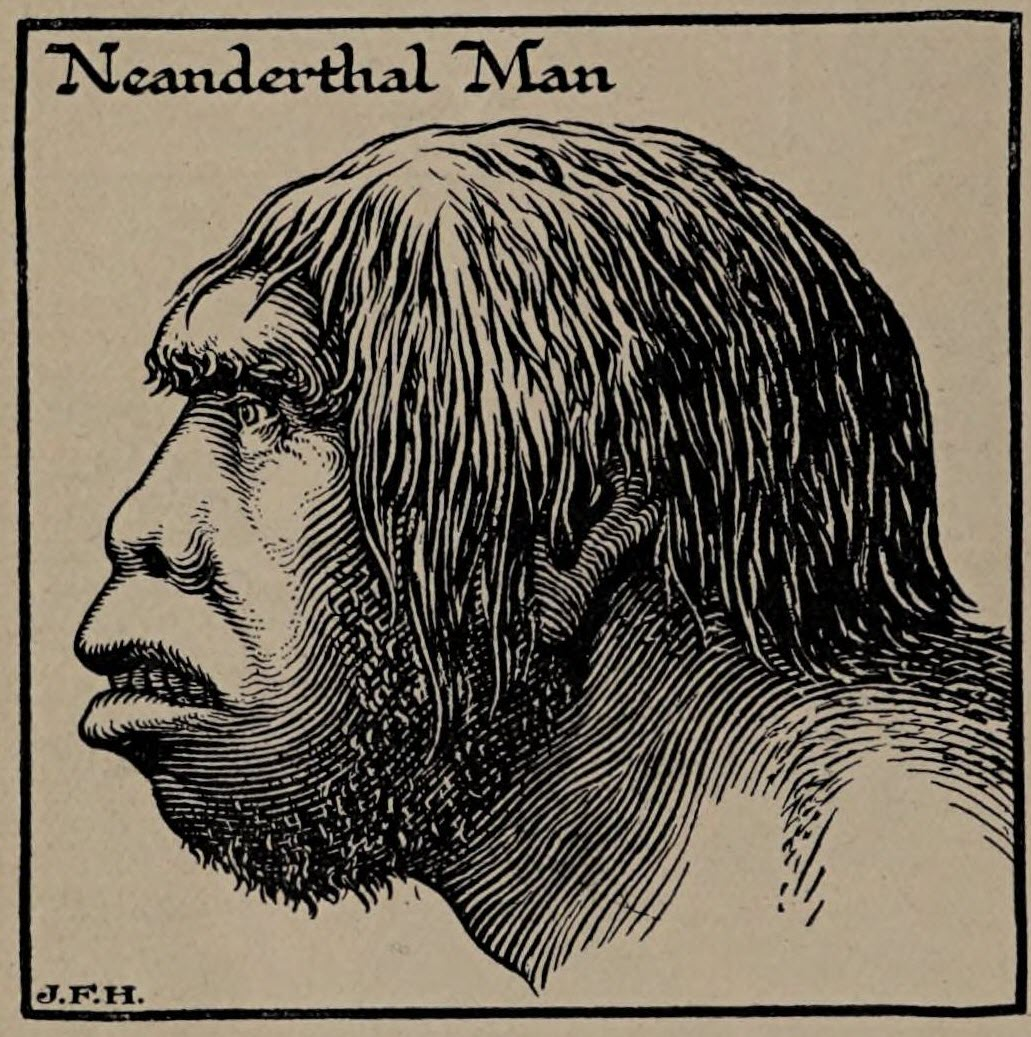
Crichton's 1976 novel Eaters of the Dead featured relict Neanderthals as antagonists.

In 1975, Crichton wrote The Great Train Robbery, which would become a bestseller. The novel is a recreation of the Great Gold Robbery of 1855, a massive gold heist, which takes place on a train traveling through Victorian era England. A considerable portion of the book was set in London. Crichton had become aware of the story when lecturing at the University of Cambridge. He later read the transcripts of the court trial and started researching the historical period.

In 1976, Crichton published Eaters of the Dead, a novel about a 10th-century Muslim who travels with a group of Vikings to their settlement. Eaters of the Dead is narrated as a scientific commentary on an old manuscript and was inspired by two sources. The first three chapters retell Ahmad ibn Fadlan's personal account of his journey north and his experiences in encountering the Rus', a Varangian tribe, whilst the remainder is based upon the story of Beowulf, culminating in battles with the 'mist-monsters', or 'wendol', a relict group of Neanderthals.

Crichton wrote and directed the suspense film Coma (1978), adapted from the 1977 novel of the same name by Robin Cook, a friend of his. There are other similarities in terms of genre and the fact that both Cook and Crichton had medical degrees, were of similar age, and wrote about similar subjects. The film was a popular success. Crichton then wrote and directed an adaptation of his own book, The Great Train Robbery (1978), starring Sean Connery and Donald Sutherland. The film would go on to be nominated for Best Cinematography Award by the British Society of Cinematographers, also garnering an Edgar Allan Poe Award for Best Motion Picture by the Mystery Writers Association of America.

In 1979, it was announced that Crichton would direct a movie version of his novel Eaters of the Dead for the newly formed Orion Pictures. This did not occur. Crichton pitched the idea of a modern day King Solomon's Mines to 20th Century Fox who paid him $1.5 million for the film rights to the novel, a screenplay and directorial fee for the movie, before a word had been written. He had never worked that way before, usually writing the book then selling it. He eventually managed to finish the book, titled Congo, which became a best seller. Crichton did the screenplay for Congo after he wrote and directed Looker (1981). Looker was a financial disappointment. Crichton came close to directing a film of Congo with Sean Connery, but the film did not happen. Eventually, a film version was made in 1995 by Frank Marshall. In 1984, Telarium released a graphic adventure based on Congo. Because Crichton had sold all adaptation rights to the novel, he set the game, named Amazon, in South America, and Amy the gorilla became Paco the parrot. That year Crichton also wrote and directed Runaway (1984), a police thriller set in the near future which was a box office disappointment.

Crichton had begun writing Sphere in 1967 as a companion piece to The Andromeda Strain. His initial storyline began with American scientists discovering a 300-year-old spaceship underwater with stenciled markings in English. However, Crichton later realized that he "didn't know where to go with it" and put off completing the book until a later date. The novel was published in 1987. It relates the story of psychologist Norman Johnson, who is required by the U.S. Navy to join a team of scientists assembled by the U.S. Government to examine an enormous alien spacecraft discovered on the bed of the Pacific Ocean, and believed to have been there for over 300 years. The novel begins as a science fiction story, but rapidly changes into a psychological thriller, ultimately exploring the nature of the human imagination. The novel was adapted into the 1998 film directed by Barry Levinson and starring Dustin Hoffman.

Crichton worked—as a director only—on Physical Evidence (1989), a thriller originally conceived as a sequel to Jagged Edge. In 1988, Crichton was a visiting writer at the Massachusetts Institute of Technology. A book of autobiographical writings, Travels, was also published in 1988.

=== Jurassic Park and subsequent works (1989–1999) ===
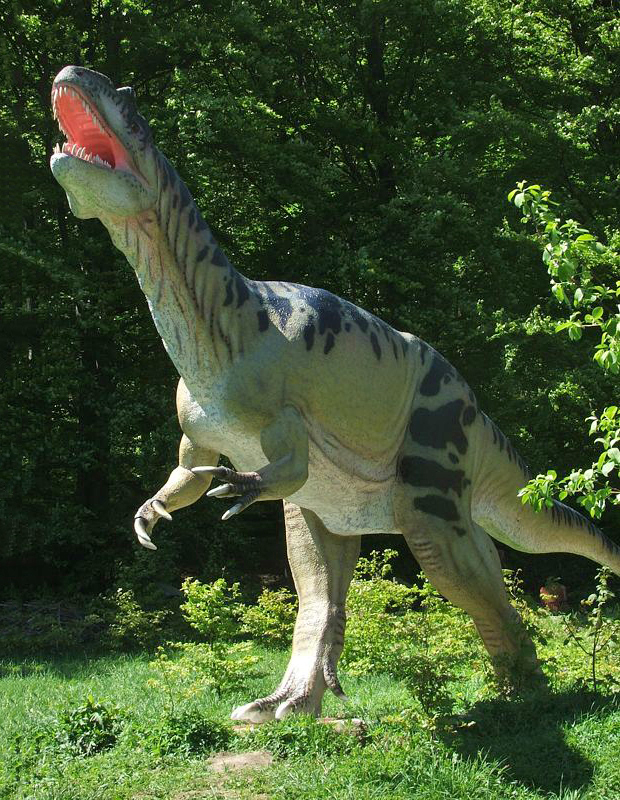
Crichton's novel Jurassic Park, and its sequels, were made into films that became a major part of popular culture, with related parks established in places as far afield as Kletno, Poland.

In 1990, Crichton published the novel Jurassic Park. Crichton used the presentation of "fiction as fact", of his previous novels, Eaters of the Dead and The Andromeda Strain. In addition, chaos theory and its philosophical implications are used to explain the collapse of an amusement park in a "biological preserve" on Isla Nublar, a fictional island to the west of Costa Rica. The novel had begun as a screenplay Crichton had written in 1983, about a graduate student who recreates a dinosaur. Reasoning that genetic research is expensive and that "there is no pressing need to create a dinosaur", Crichton concluded that it would emerge from a "desire to entertain", which led him to set the novel in a wildlife park of extinct animals. The story had originally been told from the point of view of a child, but Crichton changed it because everyone who read the draft felt it would be better if told by an adult.

Steven Spielberg learned of the novel in October 1989 while he and Crichton were discussing a screenplay that would later be developed into the television series ER. Before the book was published, Crichton demanded a non-negotiable fee of $1.5 million as well as a substantial percentage of the gross. Warner Bros. and Tim Burton, Sony Pictures Entertainment and Richard Donner, and 20th Century Fox and Joe Dante bid for the rights, but Universal eventually acquired the rights in May 1990 for Spielberg. Universal paid Crichton a further $500,000 to adapt his own novel, which he had completed by the time Spielberg was filming Hook. Crichton noted that, because the book was "fairly long", his script only had about 10% to 20% of the novel's content. The film, directed by Spielberg, was released in 1993.

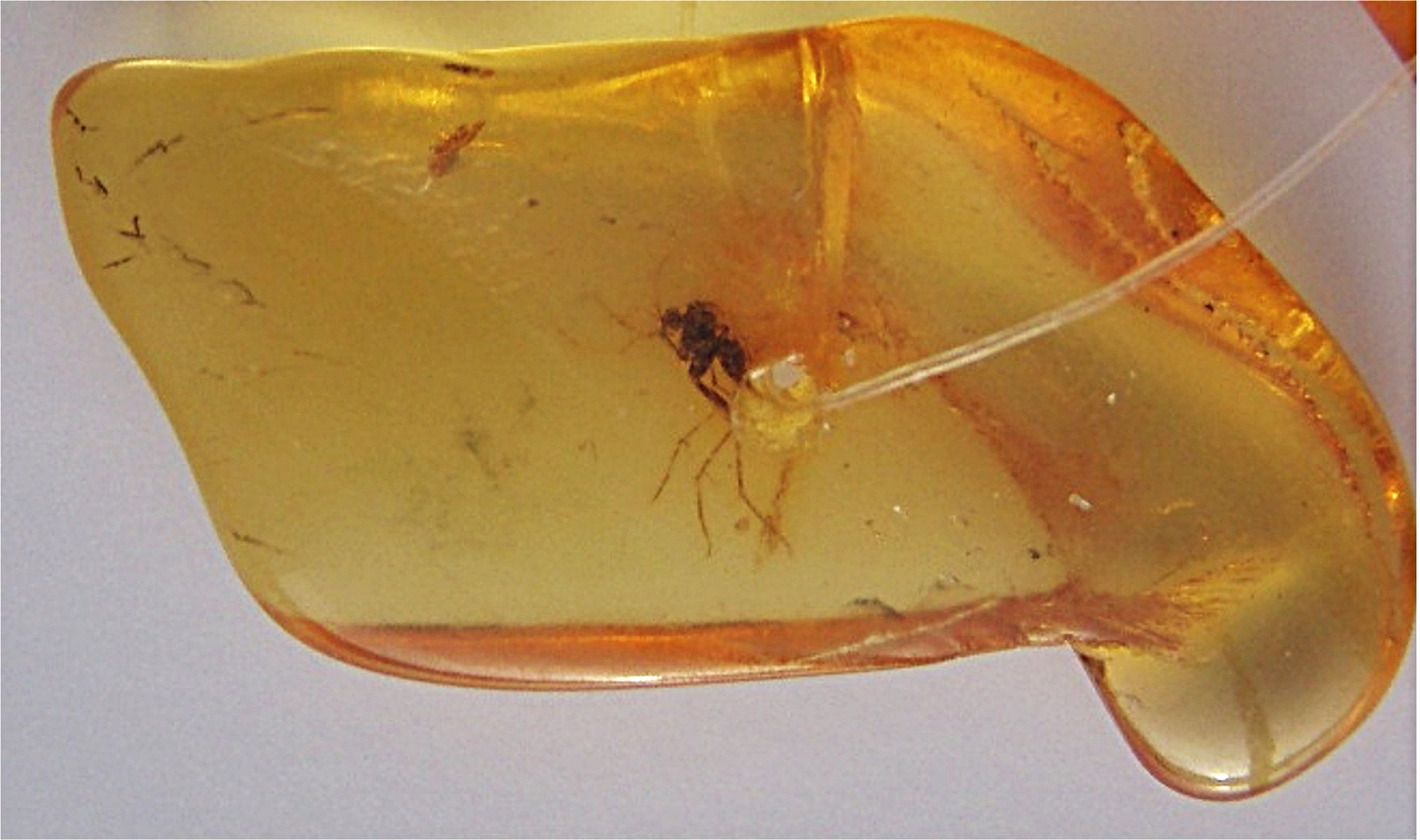
A mosquito preserved in amber. A specimen of this sort was the source of dinosaur DNA in Jurassic Park.

In 1992, Crichton published the novel Rising Sun, an internationally bestselling crime thriller about a murder in the Los Angeles headquarters of Nakamoto, a fictional Japanese corporation. The book was adapted into the 1993 film directed by Philip Kaufman and starring Sean Connery and Wesley Snipes; it was released the same year as the adaptation of Jurassic Park.

The theme of his next novel, Disclosure, published in 1994, was sexual harassment—a theme previously explored in his 1972 novel, Binary. Disclosure centers on sexual politics in the workplace, emphasizing an array of paradoxes in traditional gender roles by featuring a male protagonist who is being sexually harassed by a female executive. As a result, the book has been criticized harshly by some feminist commentators and accused of being anti-feminist. Crichton, anticipating this response, offered a rebuttal at the close of the novel which states that a "role-reversal" story uncovers aspects of the subject that would not be seen as easily with a female protagonist. The novel was made into a film the same year, directed by Barry Levinson and starring Michael Douglas and Demi Moore.

Crichton was the creator and an executive producer of the television drama ER, based on his 1974 pilot script 24 Hours. Spielberg helped develop the show, serving as an executive producer for season one and offering advice (he insisted on Julianna Margulies becoming a regular, for example). It was also through Spielberg's Amblin Entertainment that John Wells was attached as the show's executive producer. In 1995, Crichton published The Lost World as a sequel to Jurassic Park. The title was a reference to Arthur Conan Doyle's The Lost World (1912). It was made into the 1997 film two years later, again directed by Spielberg. In March 1994, Crichton said there would probably be a sequel novel as well as a film adaptation, stating that he had an idea for the novel's story. In 1996, Crichton published Airframe, an aero-techno-thriller. The book continued Crichton's overall theme of the failure of humans in human-machine interaction, given that the plane worked perfectly and the accident would not have occurred had the pilot reacted properly. He also wrote Twister (1996) with Anne-Marie Martin, his wife at the time.

In 1999, Crichton published Timeline, a science-fiction novel in which experts time travel back to the medieval period. The novel, which continued Crichton's long history of combining technical details and action in his books, explores quantum physics and time travel directly; it was also warmly received by medieval scholars, who praised his depiction of the challenges involved in researching the Middle Ages. In 1999, Crichton founded Timeline Computer Entertainment with David Smith. Although he signed a multi-title publishing deal with Eidos Interactive, only one game, Timeline, was ever published. Released by Eidos Interactive on November 10, 2000, for Windows, the game received negative reviews. A 2003 film based on the book was directed by Richard Donner and starring Paul Walker, Gerard Butler and Frances O'Connor. Eaters of the Dead was adapted into the 1999 film The 13th Warrior directed by John McTiernan, who was later removed, with Crichton himself taking over direction of reshoots.

=== Final novels and later life (2000–2008) ===
In 2002, Crichton published Prey, about developments in science and technology, specifically nanotechnology. The novel explores relatively recent phenomena engendered by the work of the scientific community, such as: artificial life, emergence (and by extension, complexity), genetic algorithms, and agent-based computing. In 2004, Crichton published State of Fear, a novel concerning eco-terrorists who attempt mass murder to support their views. The novel's central premise is that climate scientists exaggerate global warming. A review in Nature found the novel "likely to mislead the unwary". The novel had an initial print run of 1.5 million copies and reached the No. 1 bestseller position at Amazon.com and No. 2 on The New York Times Best Seller list for one week in January 2005.

The last novel published during his lifetime was Next in 2006. The novel follows many characters, including transgenic animals, in a quest to survive in a world dominated by genetic research, corporate greed, and legal interventions, wherein government and private investors spend billions of dollars every year on genetic research. In 2006, Crichton clashed with journalist Michael Crowley, a senior editor of the magazine The New Republic. In March 2006, Crowley wrote a strongly critical review of State of Fear, focusing on Crichton's stance on global warming. In the same year, Crichton published the novel Next, which contains a minor character named "Mick Crowley", who is a Yale graduate and a Washington, D.C.–based political columnist. The character was portrayed as a child molester with a small penis. The real Crowley, also a Yale graduate, alleged that by including a similarly named character Crichton had libeled him.

=== Posthumous works ===
Several novels that were in various states of completion upon Crichton's death have since been published. The first, Pirate Latitudes, was found as a manuscript on one of his computers after his death. It centers on a fictional privateer who attempts to raid a Spanish galleon. It was published in November 2009 by HarperCollins. Additionally, Crichton had completed the outline for and was roughly a third of the way through a novel titled Micro, a novel which centers on technology that shrinks humans to microscopic sizes. Micro was completed by Richard Preston using Crichton's notes and files, and was published in November 2011.

On July 28, 2016, Crichton's website and HarperCollins announced the publication of a third posthumous novel, titled Dragon Teeth, which he had written in 1974. It is a historical novel set during the Bone Wars, and includes the real life characters of Othniel Charles Marsh and Edward Drinker Cope. The novel was released in May 2017. In addition, some of his published works are being continued by other authors. On February 26, 2019, Crichton's website and HarperCollins announced the publication of The Andromeda Evolution, the sequel to The Andromeda Strain, a collaboration with CrichtonSun LLC. and author Daniel H. Wilson. It was released on November 12, 2019.

In 2020, it was announced that his unpublished works will be adapted into TV series and films in collaboration with CrichtonSun and Range Media Partners. On December 15, 2022, it was announced that James Patterson would coauthor a novel about a mega-eruption of Hawaii's Mauna Loa volcano, based on an unfinished manuscript by Crichton. The novel, Eruption, was released on June 3, 2024.

A Murder in Hollywood, a never before published novel written under the pseudonym John Lange called was released on May 5, 2026. Taking place in the 1970s, the novel follows the writer of the Western film Bloodrock, who is found dead in a motel bathtub. As publicist Harvey Jason struggles to keep the production on track, investigator Harlow Perkins begins uncovering the truth behind the death.

== Scientific and legal career ==
=== Video games and computing ===
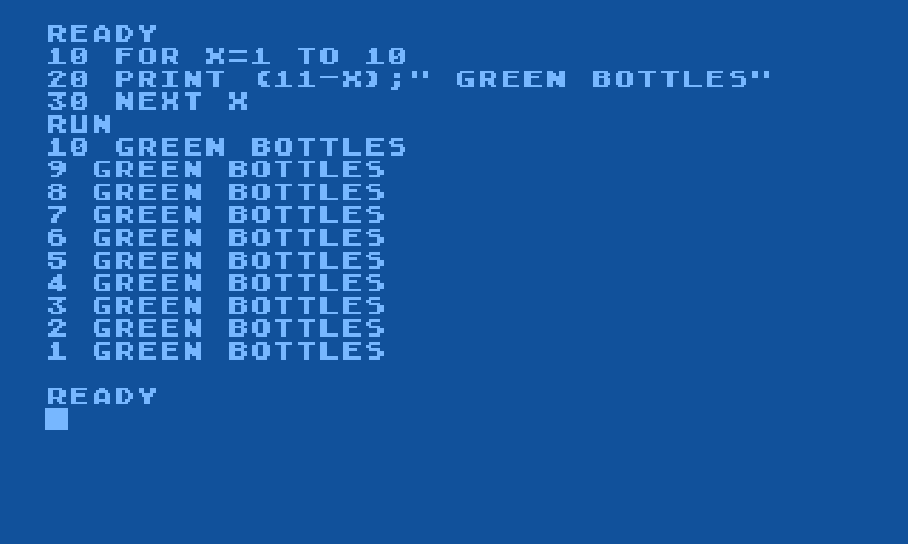
A simple BASIC program. Crichton was an early proponent of programming and computers, predicting their ubiquity.

In 1983, Crichton wrote Electronic Life, a book that introduces BASIC programming to its readers. The book, written like a glossary, with entries such as: "Afraid of Computers (everybody is)," "Buying a Computer" and "Computer Crime," was intended to introduce the idea of personal computers to a reader who might be faced with the challenge of using them at work or at home for the first time. It defined basic computer jargon and assured readers that they could master the machine when it inevitably arrived. In his words, being able to program a computer is liberation: "In my experience, you assert control over a computer—show it who's the boss—by making it do something unique. That means programming it... If you devote a couple of hours to programming a new machine, you'll feel better about it ever afterward."

In the book, Crichton predicts a number of events in the history of computer development, that computer networks would increase in importance as a matter of convenience, including the sharing of information and pictures that we see online today, which the telephone never could. He also makes predictions for computer games, dismissing them as "the hula hoops of the 80s," and saying "already there are indications that the mania for twitch games may be fading." In a section of the book called "Microprocessors, or how I flunked biostatistics at Harvard," Crichton again seeks his revenge on the teacher who had given him abnormally low grades in college. Within the book, Crichton included many self-written demonstrative Applesoft (for Apple II) and BASICA (for IBM PC compatibles) programs.

Amazon is a graphic adventure game created by Crichton and produced by John Wells. Trillium released it in the United States in 1984 initially for the Apple II, Atari 8-bit computers, and Commodore 64. Amazon sold more than 100,000 copies, making it a significant commercial success at the time. It has plot elements similar to those previously used in Congo. Crichton started a company selling a computer program he had originally written to help him create budgets for his movies. He often sought to utilize computing in films, such as Westworld, which was the first film to employ computer-generated special effects. He also pushed Spielberg to include them in the Jurassic Park films. For his pioneering use of computer programs in film production he was awarded the 1994 Academy Award for Technical Achievement.

=== Intellectual property cases ===
In November 2006, at the National Press Club in Washington, D.C., Crichton joked that he considered himself an expert in intellectual property law. He had been involved in several lawsuits with others claiming credit for his work. In 1985, the United States Court of Appeals for the Ninth Circuit heard Berkic v. Crichton, 761 F.2d 1289 (1985). Plaintiff Ted Berkic wrote a screenplay called Reincarnation Inc., which he claims Crichton plagiarized for the movie Coma. The court ruled in Crichton's favor, stating the works were not substantially similar. In the 1996 case, Williams v. Crichton, 84 F.3d 581 (2d Cir. 1996), Geoffrey Williams claimed that Jurassic Park violated his copyright covering his dinosaur-themed children's stories published in the late 1980s. The court granted summary judgment in favor of Crichton. In 1998, A United States District Court in Missouri heard the case of Kessler v. Crichton that actually went all the way to a jury trial, unlike the other cases. Plaintiff Stephen Kessler claimed the movie Twister (1996) was based on his work Catch the Wind. It took the jury about 45 minutes to reach a verdict in favor of Crichton. After the verdict, Crichton refused to shake Kessler's hand. Crichton later summarized his intellectual property legal cases: "I always win."

=== Global warming ===
Crichton became well known for attacking the science behind global warming. He testified on the subject before Congress in 2005. His views would be contested by a number of scientists and commentators. An example is meteorologist Jeffrey Masters's review of Crichton's 2004 novel State of Fear:

Flawed or misleading presentations of global warming science exist in the book, including those on Arctic sea ice thinning, correction of land-based temperature measurements for the urban heat island effect, and satellite vs. ground-based measurements of Earth's warming. I will spare the reader additional details. On the positive side, Crichton does emphasize the little-appreciated fact that while most of the world has been warming the past few decades, most of Antarctica has seen a cooling trend. The Antarctic ice sheet is actually expected to increase in mass over the next 100 years due to increased precipitation, according to the IPCC.

— Jeffery M. Masters, 2004

Peter Doran, author of the paper in the January 2002 issue of Nature, which reported the finding referred to above, stating that some areas of Antarctica had cooled between 1986 and 2000, wrote an opinion piece in The New York Times of July 27, 2006, in which he stated "Our results have been misused as 'evidence' against global warming by Michael Crichton in his novel State of Fear." Al Gore said on March 21, 2007, before a U.S. House committee: "The planet has a fever. If your baby has a fever, you go to the doctor... if your doctor tells you you need to intervene here, you don't say 'Well, I read a science fiction novel that tells me it's not a problem.'" Several commentators have interpreted this as a reference to State of Fear.

== Literary technique and style ==
Crichton's novels, including Jurassic Park, have been described by The Guardian as "harking back to the fantasy adventure fiction of Sir Arthur Conan Doyle, Jules Verne, Edgar Rice Burroughs, and Edgar Wallace, but with a contemporary spin, assisted by cutting-edge technology references made accessible for the general reader." According to The Guardian, "Michael Crichton wasn't really interested in characters, but his innate talent for storytelling enabled him to breathe new life into the science fiction thriller." Like The Guardian, The New York Times has also noted the boys adventure quality to his novels interfused with modern technology and science. According to The New York Times,

All the Crichton books depend to a certain extent on a little frisson of fear and suspense: that's what kept you turning the pages. But a deeper source of their appeal was the author's extravagant care in working out the clockwork mechanics of his experiments—the DNA replication in Jurassic Park, the time travel in Timeline, the submarine technology in Sphere. The novels have embedded in them little lectures or mini-seminars on, say, the Bernoulli principle, voice-recognition software or medieval jousting etiquette ...

The best of the Crichton novels have about them a boys' adventure quality. They owe something to the Saturday-afternoon movie serials that Mr. Crichton watched as a boy and to the adventure novels of Arthur Conan Doyle (from whom Mr. Crichton borrowed the title The Lost World and whose example showed that a novel could never have too many dinosaurs). These books thrive on yarn spinning, but they also take immense delight in the inner workings of things (as opposed to people, women especially), and they make the world—or the made-up world, anyway—seem boundlessly interesting. Readers come away entertained and also with the belief, not entirely illusory, that they have actually learned something"

— The New York Times on the works of Michael Crichton

Crichton's works were frequently cautionary, his plots often portrayed scientific advancements going awry, commonly resulting in worst-case scenarios. A notable recurring theme in Crichton's plots is the pathological failure of complex systems and their safeguards, whether biological (Jurassic Park), militaristic/organizational (The Andromeda Strain), technological (Airframe), or cybernetic (Westworld). This theme of the inevitable breakdown of "perfect" systems and the failure of "fail-safe measures" can be seen strongly in the poster for Westworld, whose slogan was, "Where nothing can possibly go worng" [sic], and in the discussion of chaos theory in Jurassic Park. His 1973 movie Westworld contains one of the earliest references to a computer virus and is the first mention of the concept of a computer virus in a movie. Crichton believed, however, that his view of technology had been misunderstood as

being out there, doing bad things to us people, like we're inside the circle of covered wagons and technology is out there firing arrows at us. We're making the technology and it is a manifestation of how we think. To the extent that we think egotistically and irrationally and paranoically and foolishly, then we have technology that will give us nuclear winters or cars that won't brake. But that's because people didn't design them right.

The use of author surrogate was a feature of Crichton's writings from the beginning of his career. In A Case of Need, one of his pseudonymous whodunit stories, Crichton used first-person narrative to portray the hero, a Bostonian pathologist, who is running against the clock to clear a friend's name from medical malpractice in a girl's death from a hack-job abortion. Crichton has used the literary technique known as the false document. Eaters of the Dead is a "recreation" of the Old English epic Beowulf presented as a scholarly translation of Ahmad ibn Fadlan's 10th century manuscript. The Andromeda Strain and Jurassic Park incorporate fictionalized scientific documents in the form of diagrams, computer output, DNA sequences, footnotes, and bibliography. The Terminal Man and State of Fear include authentic published scientific works that illustrate the premise point. Crichton often employs the premise of diverse experts or specialists assembled to tackle a unique problem requiring their individual talents and knowledge. The premise was used for The Andromeda Strain, Sphere, Jurassic Park, and, to a lesser extent, Timeline. Sometimes the individual characters in this dynamic work in the private sector and are suddenly called upon by the government to form an immediate response team once some incident or discovery triggers their mobilization. This premise or plot device has been imitated and used by other authors and screenwriters in several books, movies and television shows since.

== Personal life ==
Crichton was tall (6 ft 9 in, or 206 cm). His height made him feel isolated as an adolescent. During the 1970s and 1980s, he consulted psychics and enlightenment gurus to make him feel more socially acceptable and to improve his positive karma. As a result of these experiences, Crichton practiced meditation. While he is often regarded as a deist, he never publicly confirmed this. When asked in an online Q&A if he were a spiritual person, Crichton responded with: "Yes, but it is difficult to talk about."

Crichton was a workaholic. When drafting a novel, which would typically take him six or seven weeks, Crichton withdrew completely to follow what he called "a structured approach" of ritualistic self-denial. As he neared writing the end of each book, he would rise increasingly early each day, meaning that he would sleep for less than four hours by going to bed at 10 p.m. and waking at 2 a.m.

In 1992, Crichton was ranked among People magazine's 50 most beautiful people. He married five times. Four of the marriages ended in divorce: Joan Radam (1965–1970); Kathleen St. Johns (1978–1980); Suzanna Childs (1981–1983); and actress Anne-Marie Martin (1987–2003), the mother of his daughter (born 1989). At the time of his death, Crichton was married to Sherri Alexander (married 2005), who was six months pregnant with their son, born on February 12, 2009.

=== Politics ===
From 1990 to 1995, Crichton donated $9,750 to Democratic candidates for office. According to Pat Choate, Crichton was a supporter of Reform candidate Ross Perot in the 1996 United States presidential election. Crichton's 1992 novel Rising Sun delved into the political and economic effect of Japan–United States relations. The novel warns against foreign direct investment in the U.S. economy, with Crichton describing it in interviews as "economic suicide" for the United States. Crichton stated that his novel was written as a "wakeup call" to Americans.

In a 2003 speech, Crichton warned against partisanship in environmental legislation, arguing for an apolitical environmentalist movement. In 2005, Crichton reportedly met with Republican President George W. Bush to discuss Crichton's novel State of Fear, of which Bush was a fan. According to Fred Barnes, Bush and Crichton "talked for an hour and were in near-total agreement". In September 2005, Crichton testified on climate change before the U.S. Senate Committee on Environment and Public Works. Crichton opined that human activities are not significantly contributing to global warming, and encouraged U.S. lawmakers to examine the methodology of climate science more closely before voting on policy. His testimony received praise from Republican Senator Jim Inhofe, and criticism from Democratic Senator Hillary Clinton. Crichton's views on climate change are frequently criticized as pseudoscience.

=== Illness and death ===
According to Crichton's brother Douglas, Crichton was diagnosed with lymphoma in early 2008. His cancer was not made public until his death. He was undergoing chemotherapy treatment at the time of his death, and Crichton's physicians and relatives had been expecting him to recover. He died at age 66 on November 4, 2008.

Michael's talent outscaled even his own dinosaurs of Jurassic Park. He was the greatest at blending science with big theatrical concepts, which is what gave credibility to dinosaurs walking the earth again. In the early days, Michael had just sold The Andromeda Strain to Robert Wise at Universal and I had recently signed on as a contract TV director there. My first assignment was to show Michael Crichton around the Universal lot. We became friends and professionally Jurassic Park, ER, and Twister followed. Michael was a gentle soul who reserved his flamboyant side for his novels. There is no one in the wings that will ever take his place.

— Steven Spielberg on Michael Crichton's death

As a pop novelist, he was divine. A Crichton book was a headlong experience driven by a man who was both a natural storyteller and fiendishly clever when it came to verisimilitude; he made you believe that cloning dinosaurs wasn't just over the horizon but possible tomorrow. Maybe today.

— Stephen King on Crichton, 2008

Crichton had an extensive collection of 20th-century American art, which Christie's auctioned in May 2010.

== Reception ==
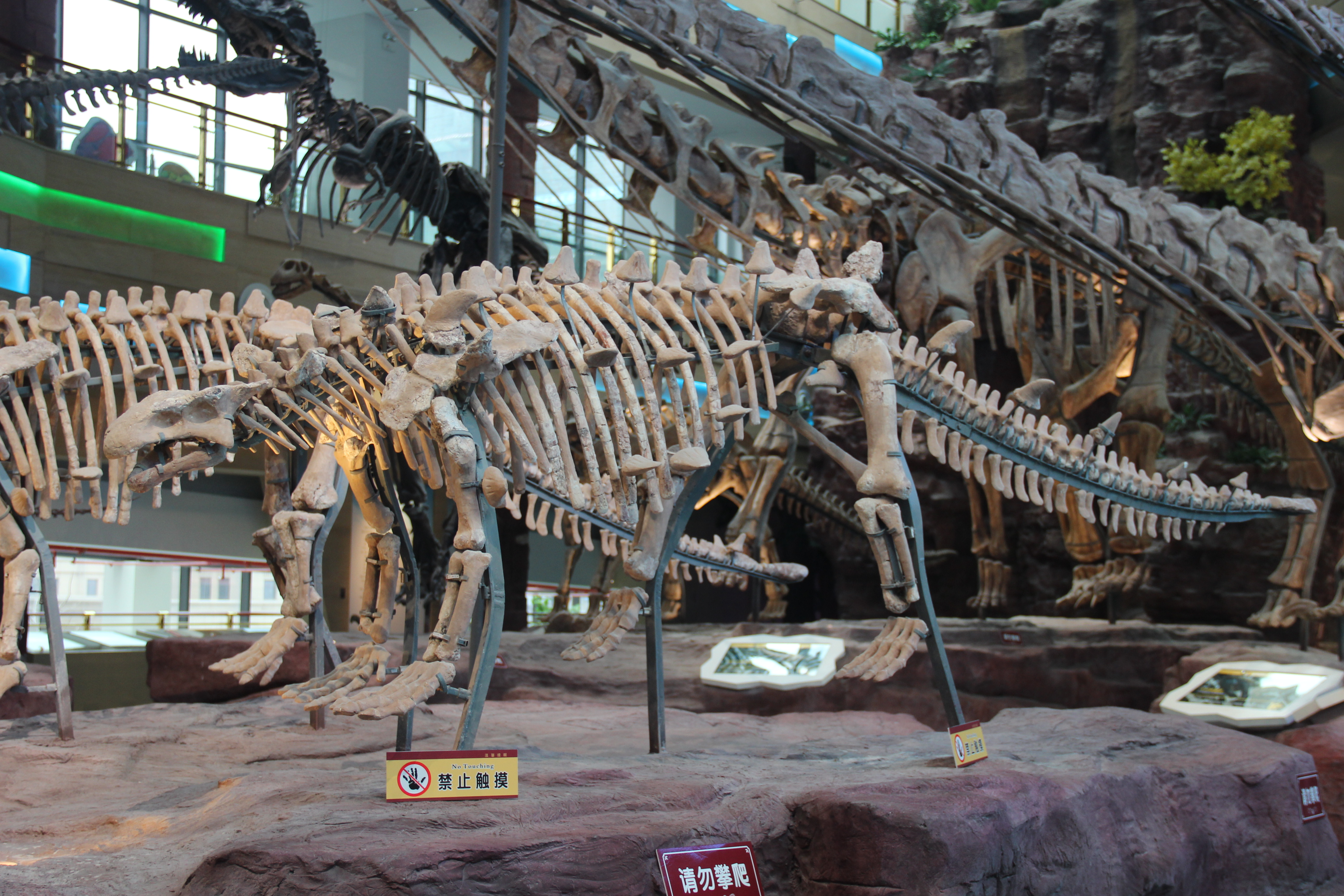
A Crichtonsaurus skeleton in China

Most of Crichton's novels address issues emerging in scientific research fields. In a number of his novels (Jurassic Park, The Lost World, Next, Congo) genomics plays an important role. Usually, the drama revolves around the sudden eruption of a scientific crisis, revealing the disruptive impacts new forms of knowledge and technology may have, as is stated in The Andromeda Strain, Crichton's first science fiction novel: "This book recounts the five-day history of a major American scientific crisis" (1969, p. 3) or The Terminal Man where unexpected behaviors are realized when electrodes are implanted into a person's brain.

=== Awards ===
- Mystery Writers of America's Edgar Allan Poe Award, Best Novel, 1969 – A Case of Need
- Association of American Medical Writers Award, 1970
- Seiun Award for Best Foreign Novel (Best Translated Long Work), 1971 for The Andromeda Strain
- Mystery Writers of America's Edgar Allan Poe Award, Best Motion Picture, 1980 – The Great Train Robbery
- Named to the list of the "Fifty Most Beautiful People" by People magazine, 1992
- Golden Plate Award of the American Academy of Achievement, 1992
- Academy of Motion Picture Arts and Sciences Technical Achievement Award, 1994
- Writers Guild of America Award, Best Long Form Television Script of 1995 (The Writer Guild list the award for 1996)
- BILBY Award's Older Readers Award in 1996 for Jurassic Park
- George Foster Peabody Award, 1994 – ER
- Primetime Emmy Award for Outstanding Drama Series, 1996 – ER
- Ankylosaur named Crichtonsaurus bohlini, 2002
- American Association of Petroleum Geologists Journalism Award, 2006
- Audie Awards for Best Science Fiction audiobook in 2016 for Jurassic Park

== Speeches, debates, and testimonies ==
Crichton was a popular public speaker.

=== Intelligence Squared debate ===
On March 14, 2007, Intelligence Squared held a debate in New York City for which the motion was Global Warming Is Not a Crisis, moderated by Brian Lehrer. Crichton was for the motion, along with Richard Lindzen and Philip Stott, versus Gavin Schmidt, Richard Somerville, and Brenda Ekwurzel, who were against the motion.

Before the debate, the audience had voted largely against the motion (57% to 30%, with 13% undecided). At the end of the debate, there was a greater shift in the audience vote for the motion (46% to 42%, with 12% undecided), resulting in Crichton's group winning the debate. Although Crichton inspired numerous blog responses and his contribution to the debate was considered one of his best rhetorical performances, reception of his message was mixed.

=== "Ritual Abuse, Hot Air, and Missed Opportunities: Science Views Media" ===
The American Association for the Advancement of Science invited Crichton to address scientists' concerns about how they are portrayed in the media. The speech was delivered in Anaheim, California, on January 25, 1999.

=== "Science Policy in the 21st century" ===
Crichton outlined several issues before a joint meeting of liberal and conservative think tanks. The speech was delivered at AEI–Brookings Institution in Washington, D.C., on January 25, 2005.

=== "The Case for Skepticism on Global Warming" ===
On January 25, 2005, at the National Press Club in Washington, D.C., Crichton presented a case against the scientific consensus on climate change, arguing that claims for catastrophic warming were doubtful and that reducing CO_{2} is vastly more difficult than is commonly presumed. He also opined that societies are morally unjustified in spending vast sums on global warming when people around the world are dying of starvation and disease. This presentation was later collected and republished in writing by the Science and Public Policy Institute, an organization which promotes climate change denial.

=== Caltech Michelin lecture ===
"Aliens Cause Global Warming", January 17, 2003. In the spirit of his science fiction writing, Crichton detailed research on nuclear winter and SETI Drake equations relative to global warming science.

=== Testimony before the United States Senate ===
Crichton was invited to testify before the US Senate Committee on Environment and Public Works in September 2005, as an "expert witness" on global warming.

=== "Complexity Theory and Environmental Management" ===
In previous speeches, Crichton criticized environmental groups for failing to incorporate complexity theory. In this speech he described in detail why he believed complexity theory is essential to environmental management, using the history of Yellowstone Park as an example of what not to do. The speech was delivered to the Washington Center for Complexity and Public Policy in Washington, D.C., on November 6, 2005.

=== "Genetic Research and Legislative Needs" ===
While writing Next, Crichton concluded that laws covering genetic research desperately needed to be revised, and spoke to congressional staff members about problems ahead. The speech was delivered to a group of legislative staffers in Washington, D.C., on September 14, 2006.

=== "Gell-Mann amnesia effect" ===
In a speech in 2002, Crichton coined the term "Gell-Mann amnesia effect" to describe the phenomenon of experts reading newspaper articles within their fields of expertise and finding them to be error-ridden and full of misunderstanding, but seemingly forgetting those experiences when reading articles in the same publications written on topics outside of their fields of expertise, which they believe to be credible. He explained that he had chosen the name ironically, because he had once discussed the effect with physicist Murray Gell-Mann, "and by dropping a famous name I imply greater importance to myself, and to the effect, than it would otherwise have".

Briefly stated, the Gell-Mann Amnesia effect works as follows. You open the newspaper to an article on some subject you know well. In Murray's case, physics. In mine, show business. You read the article and see the journalist has absolutely no understanding of either the facts or the issues. Often, the article is so wrong it actually presents the story backward–reversing cause and effect. I call these the "wet streets cause rain" stories. Paper's full of them. In any case, you read with exasperation or amusement the multiple errors in a story-and then turn the page to national or international affairs, and read with renewed interest as if the rest of the newspaper was somehow more accurate about far-off Palestine than it was about the story you just read. You turn the page, and forget what you know.

The Gell-Mann amnesia effect is similar to Erwin Knoll's law of media accuracy, which states: "Everything you read in the newspapers is absolutely true except for the rare story of which you happen to have firsthand knowledge."

== Legacy ==
In 2002, a genus of ankylosaurid, Crichtonsaurus bohlini, was named in his honor. This species was concluded to be dubious however, and some of the diagnostic fossil material was then transferred into the new binomial Crichtonpelta benxiensis, also named in his honor. His literary works continue to be adapted into films, making him the 20th highest grossing story creator of all time.

== Bibliography ==
- Golla, Robert (2011). Conversations with Michael Crichton. University Press of Mississippi. ISBN 978-1-61703-013-0.
- Hayhurst, Robert (2004). Readings on Michael Crichton. Greenhaven Press. ISBN 0-7377-1662-2.
- Kashner, Sam (January 27, 2017). "The Hitman". Vanity Fair. No. 679. pp. 172–178 and 194–195.
- Trembley, Elizabeth A. (1996). Michael Crichton: A Critical Companion. Westport, Conn.: Greenwood Press. ISBN 0-313-29414-3.
