= The Terminal Man =

1972 novel by Michael Crichton

- First edition cover
- Author: Michael Crichton
- Cover artist: Paul Bacon
- Language: English
- Genre: Science fiction
- Publisher: Knopf
- Publication date: April 12, 1972
- Publication place: United States
- Media type: Print (hardcover)
- Pages: 247
- ISBN: 0-394-44768-9
- OCLC: 213300
- Dewey Decimal: 813.5.4
- LC Class: PS3553.R48
- Preceded by: The Andromeda Strain
- Followed by: The Great Train Robbery

The Terminal Man is a novel by American writer Michael Crichton. It is his second novel under his own name, his 12th overall, and is about the dangers of mind control. It was published in April 1972 and also serialized in Playboy in March, April, and May 1972. In 1974, it was made into a film of the same name.

== Plot summary ==
The events in the novel take place between March 9 and March 13, 1971. Harold Franklin "Harry" Benson, a computer scientist in his mid-30s, is described as suffering from "psychomotor epilepsy" following a car crash two years earlier. He often has seizures followed by blackouts and then wakes up hours later with no knowledge of what he has done. During these seizures, he severely beats two people; the day before his admission, he was arrested after attacking a third. He is a prime candidate for an operation to implant an electronic "brain pacemaker" in the amygdala region of his brain to control the seizures, which will be performed in the Neuro-Psychiatric Service (NPS) of University Hospital. Two NPS surgeons, John Ellis and Robert Morris, are to perform the unprecedented surgery.

The ramifications of the procedure are questioned by the NPS's staff psychiatrist, Janet Ross, and later by her former teacher, Manon, an emeritus professor. Manon raises concerns that Benson is psychotic and predicts that the crimes he commits during the blackouts will not be curtailed. Ellis admits that what they are doing is not a cure for Benson's personality disorder, but will simply stimulate the brain preventively when a computer senses an oncoming seizure. Ellis argues he is not convinced that not operating will do Benson any favors; Benson's condition threatens Benson's life and those of others, has already undermined Benson's legal status three times, and is worsening. Despite the concerns voiced, the team decides to go ahead with the operation.

Forty electrodes are implanted into Benson's brain, controlled by a small computer that is powered by a plutonium power pack in his shoulder. Benson must wear a dog tag with instructions to call University Hospital if he is injured, as his power pack may emit radiation. During the procedure, the implant deviates slightly from its planned path, but this is corrected. While he is recovering, a woman identifying herself as Angela Black gives Morris a black wig for Benson following the surgery, whose head was shaved prior to the operation. Morris refuses a man who volunteers to have electrodes put into his brain to stimulate pleasure unchecked, because he realizes that people like Benson could potentially become addicts; he recalls a Norwegian man with schizophrenia who was allowed to stimulate himself as much as desired, to the extent that the man caused himself brain damage. Roger A. McPherson, the head of the NPS, interviews Benson and realizes Manon and Ross were right about his psychosis, ordering nurses to administer thorazine to Benson.

After resting for a day, Benson goes through "interfacing". The electrodes are activated one by one to test which ones would stop a seizure. Each electrode produces different results; one stimulates a sexual pleasure. Gerhard, one of the technicians administering the test, shows his findings to Ross, who discovers that the seizures are becoming more frequent. She explains that Benson is learning to initiate seizures voluntarily because the result of these seizures is a shock of pleasure, which leads to him having more frequent seizures. Ross further discovers that due to a clerical error by the nurses, Benson has not been receiving thorazine. She then finds out that Benson, using the wig and disguising himself as an orderly, has evaded the police officer assigned to guard him and escaped from the hospital.

Ross goes to Benson's house, where she finds two girls who say he has a gun and possesses blueprints for the basement of the hospital, where the computer mainframe is located. Morris meets Benson's boss, who tells him that Benson disliked University Hospital because of its ultra-modern computer system, an upgraded IBM System/360. After Benson's dogtag is found at the murder scene of Angela Black, Ross is questioned by police. Benson confronts Ross in her house and attacks her upon having a seizure. Just before losing consciousness, Ross manages to turn on her microwave oven, the radiation of which affects the power pack in Benson's shoulder and forces him to flee. Morris uses a book of matches found on Angela's body to track Benson to an airport hotel. Finding a mechanic who has been beaten by Benson, Morris is attacked and injured, as well.

Back at the hospital, Ross receives a phone call from Benson, which is traced to somewhere inside the building. The hospital's computers begin to malfunction, as if somebody were disturbing the mainframe. Ross and Anders go down into the basement, where Anders exchanges fire with and injures Benson before becoming lost in the maze of corridors. Benson goes back to the computer room and finds Ross. Ross picks up Benson's gun, and after an internal struggle, shoots and kills Benson unintentionally.

== Background ==
According to Crichton:

In the 1970s, I saw a patient in a hospital who was being treated with electrodes implanted in the brain, hooked up to a monitoring computer. I thought this treatment was horrific, and I was amazed that the research seemed to be going forward with no public discussion or even knowledge. I decided to write a novel to make such procedures better known. This particular kind of surgery is no longer done much, so the journalistic aspects of the story are gone.

At one stage the novel was known as "The Sympathetic Man". Crichton said it was "intended to be a story about arrogance. It is about people who really didn't think through the consequences of what they were doing."

Crichton stated that this was his least-favorite work.

== Film adaptation ==
The novel was made into a film in 1974.

== Reception ==
As with his previous bestseller The Andromeda Strain, reviews for The Terminal Man were widely positive. The Los Angeles Times called it "an entertaining and unsparing narrative, compressed and scientifically sound." The New Yorker called the novel "a fascinating, splendidly documented thriller." Life said it was "an absolutely riveting novel." John Barkham Reviews called it "a superb thriller" and said, "It will make you think-and shudder."

The novel was criticized by the American Epilepsy Foundation, which said it unfairly linked epilepsy with violence.

== Real-life epilepsy device ==
Crichton's technological science-fiction premise became reality half a century later, in 2023, when a British boy had a neurostimulator fitted inside his skull, sending electrical signals deep into his brain to control seizures.
