= List of techno-thriller novels =

This is a list of notable techno-thriller novels, novel series, and collections of linked short stories.

== Significant techno-thriller authors and works ==
Author	Title(s)
Bond, Larry	Vortex — a South African war that spreads to neighboring nations and ultimately involves Cuba and the United States.; Cauldron — a French and German led European Confederation go to war with the US, Great Britain and several Eastern European countries over the Polish, Czech and others refusal to join the European Confederation - satellite weapons, military aircraft and nuclear weapons.
Boush, Sam	All Systems Down — cyber war
Brown, Dale	Flight of the Old Dog — laser technology; Day of the Cheetah — fighter aircraft technology, espionage; The Tin Man — body armor technology
Brown, Dan	Deception Point — about a discovery of a meteorite with "proof" of extraterrestrial life, microbotics, weapons technologies; Digital Fortress — computer technologies
Carr, Caleb	Killing Time — disinformation society
Condon, Richard	The Manchurian Candidate — mind control
Preston, Douglas and Child, Lincoln	Relic — genetic manipulation, museum; The Ice Limit — meteorite; Mount Dragon; Brimstone; Dance of Death; The Book of the Dead
Clancy, Tom	The Hunt for Red October — submarine technology, espionage; Red Storm Rising (co-authored with aforementioned Larry Bond) — a (mostly conventional) third world war fought in Europe between NATO and Warsaw Pact forces, military technology; The Cardinal of the Kremlin — Russia develops a version of the Strategic Defense Initiative (SDI) missile-defense system; Rainbow Six — modern counter-terrorism operations
Coyle, Harold	Team Yankee
Crichton, Michael	The Andromeda Strain — alien micro-organisms, microbiology, medicine; Jurassic Park, The Lost World — cloning, dinosaurs, chaos theory; Airframe — aerospace; Prey (2002) — nanotechnology; State of Fear — eco-terrorism; Next — genetic research, criticism of patents; Micro
Deighton, Len	The IPCRESS File — mind control
DeSmedt, Bill	Singularity
Doctorow, Cory	Little Brother — mass surveillance, hacking and government conspiracies, terrorism
Harry, Eric	Arc Light — a third world war including a large-scale nuclear exchange and the limited use of chemical and biological weapons.; Invasion — a conventional Chinese invasion of the United States, infantry warfare.
Hamilton, Peter	Fallen Dragon — armor technology, warfare, bioengineering, economics, AI, hacking
Kerr, Philip	Gridiron — architecture, smart-building technology, feng shui; A Philosophical Investigation — speculative neuropathology, philosophy, gender and criminal investigation; The Second Angel
Ludlum, Robert	The Arctic Event — bioweapons; The Jason Bourne novels — mind control, memory erasure and conditioning
Mayberry, Jonathan	Patient Zero — military, terrorists, zombies, pathogens; The Dragon Factory
MacLean, Alistair	The Satan Bug (1962) — bioweapons
Nylund, Eric	A Signal Shattered
Pavlou, Stel	Decipher — nanotechnology, solar physics; Gene — genetic engineering
Peters, Ralph	Red Army; The War in 2020
Phelan, James Clancy	Fox Hunt; Patriot Act
Reilly, Matthew	Ice Station; Area 7; Scarecrow; Temple; Scarecrow and the Army of Thieves
Rollins, James	Sandstorm; Deep Fathom
Schätzing, Frank	The Swarm - Oceanography, Microbiology, Swarm intelligence
Stephenson, Neal	Cryptonomicon — encryption; Reamde — hacking, MMORPG, encryption, Terrorism
Suarez, Daniel	Daemon (2006) — hacking, MMORPG, mixed & augmented reality, sensor systems, autonomous vehicles, Internet.; Freedom™ — follow-up to Daemon; Kill Decision — robots, war, drone technology
Thomas, Craig	Firefox — hypersonic fighter aircraft with stealth technology, the MiG-31 Firefox; film adaptation produced and directed by Clint Eastwood; Firefox Down
Wager, Walter	Telefon — mind control, nuclear warfare
Wehr, Dietmar	Whiskey Kilo One Is Down; The Battle For Mars series; The Hunt For Seawolf 4
