= Silver Tower (novel) =

1988 novel by Dale Brown

First edition

Silver Tower is a technothriller written by Dale Brown. The paperback publication of the novel was a New York Times bestseller. After its initial publication by Donald I. Fine, Berkley Books purchased the rights to reprint Silver Tower and Day of the Cheetah for $642,500.

== Synopsis ==
Armstrong Space Station, known as the Silver Tower, is the first military station built by the United States to defend against ballistic missiles. With its arsenal of Thor Anti-ballistic missiles and a Tactical High Energy Laser weapon called Skybolt, it is a fearsome military weapon in space. Along with its highly specialised crew of scientists and engineers, led by General Jason St. Michael it forms a vital "eye in the sky", to assist the US military on the battlefield.

The Soviets have decided to invade Iran in order to gain control of the Persian Gulf. They mount a surprising lightning air attack on Iran and place their aircraft carrier flotilla near the Persian Gulf. The Americans send the USS Nimitz and her carrier battle group in response. They also have Silver Tower, the ace up their sleeve to watch over the carrier and provide real time view from space.

The Soviets who are aware of Silver Tower use a powerful ground laser in an attempt to destroy or cripple the space station. But to the Soviet's surprise, the tower and its crew survive and continue to assist the Nimitz. Furious at their previous failed attempt, the Soviets send Elektron Spaceplanes to destroy the space station. This time, the station is massively crippled, but some of the crew members sacrifice their lives by manually launching the Thor missiles at one of the space planes, destroying it. The crippled space station is then evacuated to the Space Shuttle Enterprise.

Meanwhile, the situation back on the ground gets tense, with F-14s and F-15s engaging in dogfights with Tu-22M bombers and Su-33s launched from the aircraft carriers and missile ships exchanging fire. Both sides suffer heavy casualties. However, the Americans succeed in keeping the Soviet carrier group out of the Persian Gulf.

The survivors Jason St. Michael and Anne Page return to Silver Tower hoping to restart its systems, only to be met with another attack from the Elektron spaceplanes. However, they restore the Skybolt laser module and fire on the spaceplanes, vaporizing them. They then fire the laser on Soviet cruise missiles heading for the Nimitz group.

In the end, even though the battle is not over, the Red Fleet is kept out of the Persian Gulf and Silver Tower is to be repaired and returned to operation.

== Reception ==
Reviewer Howard Kaplan of the Denver Post called it a "swift, highly entertaining read" and praised the aerial combat descriptions. Peter Rowe of the San Diego Union called it a "dramatized ad for the Strategic Air Command," and said that technical or scientific background would be needed to understand it. Rory Quirk of The Washington Post said in his review that Brown's Air Force background provided "in-the-maw-of-the-machine authenticity," and that the plot was "sometimes plausible occasionally far fetched," and that there was "technological overkill." He said the love interest was a "contrived throw-in."
