= Night of the Hawk =

Novel by Dale Brown

First edition (publ. Putnam)

Night of the Hawk is a 1992 techno-thriller written by Dale Brown. It is the sequel to the events of the Flight of the Old Dog in which a crew member - Dr. David Luger - sacrifices himself to save the Old Dog crew.

== Plot ==
The novel prologue retells part of the events of Flight of the Old Dog from the perspective of crew member David Luger, as he makes the decision to sacrifice himself in order to allow his crewmates to take off from a Soviet airbase and return home. He subsequently awakens in a Soviet military hospital, where Soviet KGB officers have begun plans to brainwash him and make use of his extensive technical knowledge.

Five years later, a special operations mission to rescue a Lithuanian CIA agent/defector recovers a photo of Luger, now brainwashed into working for a Soviet aircraft design bureau under a false identity. USAF Col. Paul White, leader of the CIA extraction team, recognizes Luger, having formerly worked with both him and fellow Old Dog crew member Patrick McLanahan. After receiving no substantive response from the normal chain of command, White seeks out Lieutenant General Bradley Elliot, commander of the top-secret High-Technology Aerospace Weapons Center (HAWC) or Dreamland facility and former leader of the Old Dog mission. Elliot convinces his superiors to authorize a mission to rescue Luger, but is unconvinced that they will follow through, and so conspires with White to set up his own mission.

Simultaneously, General Dominikas Palcikas, commander of the Lithuanian Self-Defense Forces, labors under the challenge of creating a post-Soviet identity for his forces while training them to defend against a possible invasion from neighboring Belarus and its power-hungry military commander, General Voschanka.

As matters come to a head in Lithuania, General Voschanka invades, threatening to overrun the country at the same time as the mission to extract Luger goes in. Despite the unauthorized nature of the additional forces gathered by Elliot and White, the American President and military commanders have no choice but to make use of those forces to stop the Belarusian invasion. Elliot's high-tech bombers and White's commandos successfully aid the Lithuanian forces in repelling the Belarusian invasion, along with Luger and McLanahan, who steal the Russian stealth bomber which Luger was forced to help design, the fictional Fiskious Fi-170. In a final act of desperation and revenge, General Voschanka launches a nuclear missile at Vilnius, which is intercepted in the nick of time by one of Elliot's bombers.

Back in the United States, Luger is reunited with the rest of his former crewmates at Dreamland, where a DIA official states he must be take into custody due to his long absence. The HAWC staff manage to switch Luger with the defector and the President allows Luger to stay at HAWC under Elliot's authority.

== Characters ==
- Lt Gen Bradley Elliot - Commander of HAWC
- Maj Patrick McLanahan - EB-52 bombardier
- Dr. David Luger/Ivan Ozerov - Radar navigator at HAWC / Designer of Fi-170 at Fisikous
- Brig Gen Jon Ormack - Old Dog crew member
- Maj Hal Briggs - Senior security chief at HAWC
- Maj Gen Dominikas Palcikas - Commander of Lithuanian armed forces

== Reception ==
Publishers Weekly said "the Old Dog's frequently recycled crew is becoming somewhat shopworn," but still called it a "blockbuster" and said it "demonstrates the exciting possibilities open to the techno-thriller in a post-Soviet world." Kirkus Reviews said the novel was "Longer than Desert Storm--but with much more satisfactory results." It reached number 7 on the New York Times fiction bestseller list in September 1992.
