= Michael Crowley (journalist) =

American journalist

- Born: Michael Leland Crowley; April 1, 1972 (age 54)
- Education: Yale University (1994)
- Occupation: Journalist
- Spouse: Sarah Haight (m. 2013)

Michael Leland Crowley (born 1 April 1972) is an American journalist who is White House correspondent for The New York Times.

From 2010 to 2014, he served as the senior foreign affairs correspondent and deputy Washington, D.C. bureau chief for Time magazine, and was senior foreign affairs correspondent for Politico. Until May 2019, he was White House and national security editor for Politico.

== Early life ==
Crowley grew up in New Haven, Connecticut. His father, Joseph D. Crowley, is the president of a petroleum and dry-cargo storage at New Haven Harbor, while his mother, Phyllis F. Crowley, is a landscape and portrait photographer.

Crowley graduated from Yale University in 1994.

== Career ==
From 2010 to 2014, Crowley was a writer, editor, and senior foreign affairs correspondent for Time, serving as the deputy Washington, D.C., bureau chief. From 2000 to 2010, he was a writer for The New Republic, where he covered domestic politics and foreign policy. He was also a reporter at the Boston Globe and the Boston Phoenix.

His work has also been published in The New York Times, The Atlantic, GQ, New York, and Slate.

He often appears on PBS, NPR, and MS NOW.

Crowley has reported from many countries including Iraq, China, Israel, Pakistan, Afghanistan, Egypt, Mexico, Saudi Arabia, Turkey, Lebanon, Germany, and Ukraine.

== Personal life ==
In a 2006 dispute between Crowley and Michael Crichton, Crowley alleged that after he wrote an unflattering review of Crichton's novel State of Fear, Crichton included a character named "Mick Crowley" in the novel Next. The character is a child rapist, described as being a Washington, D.C.–based journalist and Yale graduate with a small penis, and is therefore noted as the variant of the roman à clef called the small penis rule.

In 2013 Crowley married Sarah McDonald Haight in Lenox, Massachusetts. Haight is a program manager for the nonprofit Aspen Institute in Washington, D.C.
