= Storming Heaven =

Storming Heaven may refer to:

- Storming Heaven (Brown novel), a 1994 novel by Dale Brown
- Storming Heaven (Giardina novel), a 1987 novel by Denise Giardina
- Storming Heaven (comics), a comic strip by Gordon Rennie and Frazer Irving
- Storming Heaven: LSD and the American Dream, a 1987 book by Jay Stevens
- Storming Heaven: Class composition and struggle in Italian Autonomist Marxism, a 2002 book by Steve Wright

== See also ==
- A Storm in Heaven, a 1993 album by the Verve
