= Daniel Suarez (author) =

American novelist (born 1964)

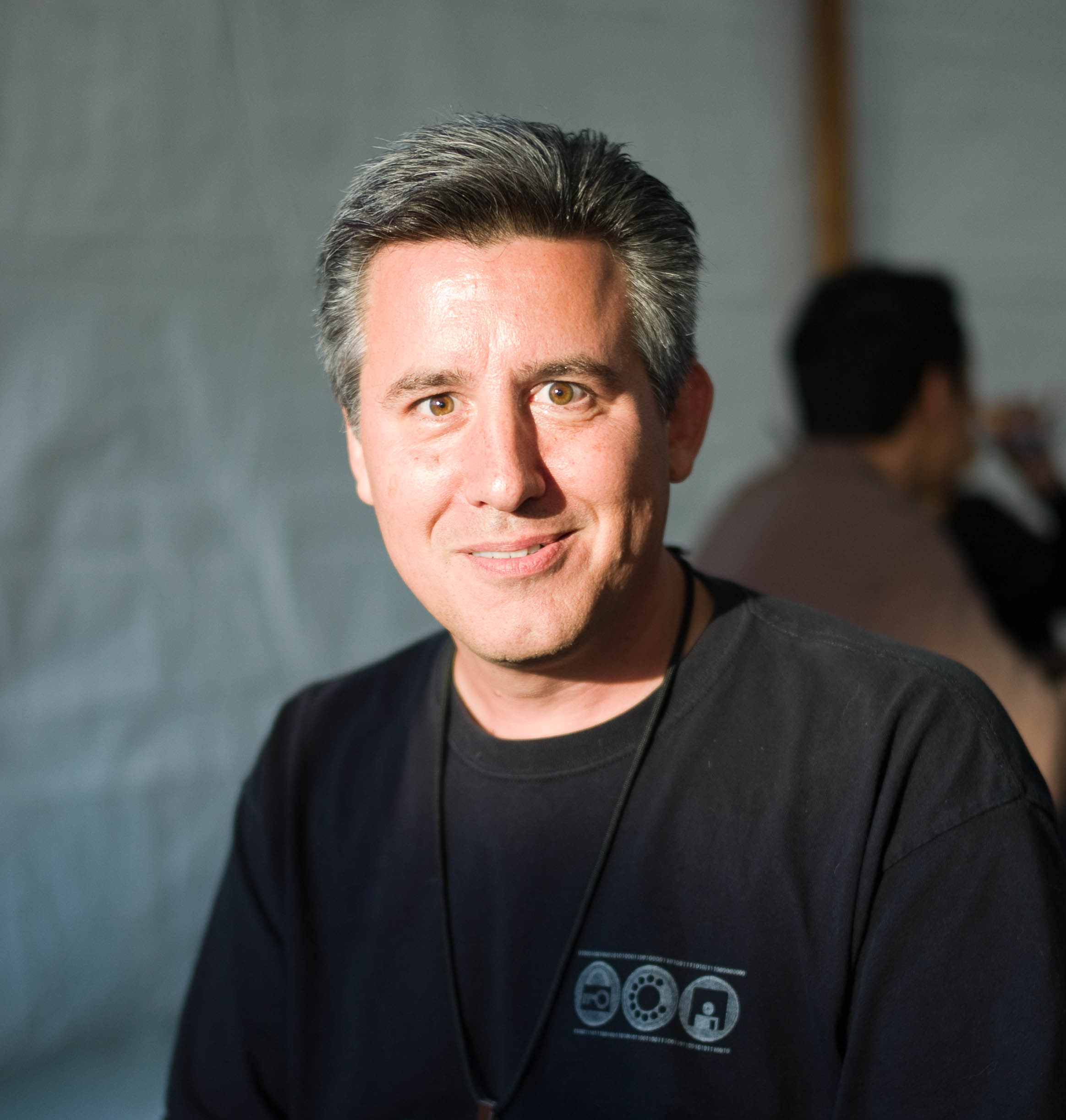
- Suarez in 2010
- Born: December 21, 1964 (age 61)
- Occupation: Novelist
- Writing career
- Pen name: Leinad Zeraus
- Genre: Science fiction
- Movements: Techno-thriller, Postcyberpunk
- Website: daniel-suarez.com

Daniel Suarez (born December 21, 1964) is an American novelist, writing principally in the science fiction and techno-thriller genres. He initially published under the pseudonym Leinad Zeraus (his name spelled backwards).

== Career ==
Suarez's career as an author began with a pair of techno-thriller novels. The first novel, Daemon, was self-published under his own company, Verdugo Press, in late 2006. It was later picked up by the major publishing house Dutton and re-released in January 2009. His follow-up book Freedom™ was released in January 2010. The Wall Street Journal reported that Walter F. Parkes, who produced the 1983 film WarGames, had optioned the film rights to Daemon with Paramount Pictures in 2009, but the rights likely reverted to Suarez in December 2012.

Suarez announced in November 2011 that he was writing his third novel, "which deals with autonomous drones and next-gen, anonymous warfare". That novel, Kill Decision, was released on July 19, 2012. His next book, Influx, was released on February 20, 2014. Influx won the 2015 Prometheus Award. His fifth book, Change Agent, was released on April 18, 2017 and uses CRISPR as its theme. His most recent novel, Critical Mass (2023), deals with the near future effects of asteroid mining and the privatization of space, and is the second part of a trilogy that started with Delta-v (2019). Critical Mass awarded Suarez his second Prometheus Award.

== Literary works ==
- —— (2009). Daemon. New York: Dutton. ISBN 9780525951117.
- —— (2010). Freedom™. New York: Dutton. ISBN 9780525951575.
- —— (2012). Kill Decision. New York: Dutton. ISBN 9780525952619.
- —— (2014). Influx. New York: Dutton. ISBN 9780525953180.
- —— (2017). Change Agent. New York: Dutton. ISBN 9781101984666.
- —— (2019). Delta-v. New York: Dutton. ISBN 9781524742416.
- —— (2023). Critical Mass. New York: Dutton. ISBN 9780593183632.
- —— (2027). Shadow Zone. New York: Dutton (published Mar 30, 2027). ISBN 9798217047284.
