= Arc Light (novel) =

1994 debut novel by Eric L. Harry

- First edition (h/b)
- Author: Eric L. Harry
- Language: English
- Genre: Techno-thriller
- Publisher: Simon & Schuster (hardcover); Jove Books (paperback)
- Publication date: September 1994
- Publication place: United States of America
- Media type: Print (hardback & paperback)
- Pages: 625 pp (paperback edition)
- ISBN: 0-671-88048-9 (hardcover); ISBN 0-515-11792-7 (paperback)
- OCLC: 30355388
- Dewey Decimal: 813/.54 20
- LC Class: PS3558.A6753 A89 1994

Arc Light is the debut novel by Eric L. Harry and is a techno-thriller about a limited nuclear war published in September 1994 and written in 1991 and 1992.

As China and Russia clash in Siberia, and war brews between the United States and North Korea, a series of accidents and misunderstandings lead to a Russian nuclear strike against the United States. The US retaliates against Russia, and World War III begins.

The novel becomes part military techno thriller, part political drama, as heated internal debates concerning the right course of action in the war unfold on both sides, and each government tries to deal with the colossal damage the nuclear strike has done to its country. Moderate voices try to prevent a second nuclear exchange by taming the hawks and working behind the scenes to arrange a ceasefire. Meanwhile, the on-the-ground consequences for both civilians and the military are explored in depth.

The novel focuses on three key groups:

- National Security Advisor Greg Lambert and his immediate political superiors: President Walter Livingston, his successor, as well as the National Security Council.
- Major David Chandler, US Army Reserve, as he is activated and sent to Europe, where his unit spearheads the allied advance towards Moscow.
- Chandler's wife, Melissa, as she struggles with the birth of their first child in the midst of a nuclear war.

The title refers to the term arclight, which was a code during the Vietnam War for a strike by a B-52. This term is used in the opening pages of the book.

== Plot summary ==
=== Prologue ===
Set in the late 1990s against the backdrop of a stalemated Russo-Chinese war for control of Eastern Siberia, North Korea invades the Demilitarized Zone weeks before the planned reunification of Korea

=== Part I ===
In an effort to end the war quickly, the commander of the Russian Siberian Military District, General Yuri Razov, calls the US Chairman of the Joint Chiefs of Staff, General Andrew Thomas, to warn the United States of Russia's decision to use tactical nuclear weapons against China. Thomas tries but fails to talk Razov out of the decision. In Moscow, a radical anti-Western Russian general, Zorin, kills the civilian government and STAVKA with a bomb, seizing control of the Kremlin in a swift coup d'etat and taking command of the nuclear communicators.

In Washington, DC, US National Security Advisor Greg Lambert has dinner with Russian military attaché Pavel Filipov, a close friend of his and his family's. As a reward for US logistical cooperation in the war against China, Filipov reveals that General Zorin was the one who convinced the North Koreans to invade the Demilitarized Zone to preserve Russia's supply lines across the Korean Peninsula.

As the Russian nuclear attack on China unfolds, the US preemptively goes to DEFCON 3 and recalls all its military forces. Lambert is ordered to board Nightwatch with the rest of the Cabinet and the Joint Chiefs, while Filipov is recalled to Moscow. As the White House is evacuated, US President Walter Livingston instructs the Secretary of State to warn the Chinese of the impending strike, lest the US becomes complicit in Russia's heinous actions. Lambert is wary of the ramifications of Livingston's decision, but the chaos of the evacuation prevents the President from hearing his advisor's objections.

In Los Angeles, US Army Reserve Major David Chandler is ordered to report to March Air Force Base to take command of his unit, leaving behind his wife Melissa, who is nine months pregnant. As the mobilization continues, Melissa goes into labor and decides to leave the city.

In the Kremlin bunker, Zorin watches the US evacuation and bomber takeoffs on cable news. Outside, loyalist government forces cut off the coup plotters' communications and take the complex by force, leaving Zorin unable to contact most of Russia's armed forces, including Razov's nuclear attack in the Russian Far East.

After being warned by the US of Russia's impending nuclear attack, China retaliates by launching its own nuclear weapons against Russia. However, the warheads aimed at Moscow are intercepted by the nuclear-tipped anti-ballistic missile system deployed around the capital. Zorin, sleep-deprived and under the influence of amphetamines, is convinced that the US has taken advantage of the confusion and launched a first strike against Russia. Still in control of the nuclear communicators, Zorin orders the ICBM forces in western Russia to launch at their pre-programmed targets. Russia's ballistic missile submarines are not used in the attack, as their missiles are far less accurate than the ICBMs and thus only useful for hitting large targets with large margins of error, such as population centers. The submarines are ordered to maintain their positions in a "bastion" around the Kara Sea, to be used if Russia orders a second strike.

Aboard Nightwatch, President Livingston and his staff are informed of the Chinese retaliation against Russia. At the same time, however, they receive a warning that Russian strategic nuclear weapons are attacking the United States. Based on its trajectory, the attack is classified as a "counterforce strike" aimed at American strategic military facilities (such as missile silos, major air and naval bases, and NORAD) rather than civilian infrastructure. The president takes the advice of the Joint Chiefs and orders its own ICBMs to retaliate in kind against Russia's Strategic Rocket Forces before they are destroyed in the incoming attack.

At March AFB, Chandler takes command of his assigned battalion and boards a commercial airliner for an unknown destination. Minutes later, the base is obliterated by dozens of Russian nuclear warheads. Other targets such as Cheyenne Mountain, Raven Rock, along with US nuclear silos and major bomber and radar bases, suffer a similar fate. Immediate casualties in the continental United States are estimated to be between 4.5 and 7 million dead, with hundreds of thousands more severely injured or exposed to high doses of radiation.

While President Livingston retires to his private cabin aboard Nightwatch to collect his thoughts, JCS Chairman Thomas wonders to the rest of the staff how the Chinese were able to retaliate so quickly since their missile forces are not as advanced as those of Russia or the US and require a long preparation time. Lambert informs Thomas and the rest of the staff of Livingston's order to warn China of Russia's attack. The revelation shakes the staff's confidence in the President's ability to lead the country.

Returning to Moscow from the Far East, Razov arrests Zorin and the rest of the coup plotters. Over the hotline, Razov assures Livingston that the nuclear attack on the US was a mistake and promises that there will be no more attacks from Russia. Livingston disgustedly disconnects from Moscow and tells Razov that he had better keep his word about no more attacks, as the US continues its nuclear retaliation against Russia. A reformed STAVKA learns that the submarines in the Kara Sea bastion have received orders from Zorin to launch their nuclear missiles simultaneously in case they are attacked, and to disregard any recall orders.

With ground communications lost, Chandler's plane is notified to land at Gander Airport in Newfoundland and Labrador, Canada.

=== Part II ===
Still aboard Nightwatch, President Livingston and his cabinet plan for the aftermath of the nuclear strike. Since the Russian attack did not directly target civilians, casualties are relatively low. To prevent the conflict from escalating further, Livingston orders the US military to stand down and only engage Russian forces if fired upon first, a decision that causes Lambert and the military staff to question the President's judgment. The stress takes its toll on the President, who must approve every emergency decision that reaches his desk, including farming in the midst of radioactive fallout, calling the draft lottery, housing, and disaster management.

Meanwhile, at the Congressional Bunker in Greenbrier, West Virginia, the surviving members of the US Congress meet in an emergency session to pass a declaration of war, instructing the President to prosecute the war until all of Russia's nuclear forces are disarmed or destroyed. From Mount Weather, Vice President Paul Constanzo makes a televised address calling for a massive military response against Russia in retaliation for its attack on the US. Constanzo's words are diametrically opposed to Livingston's strategy, who believes that a land invasion of Russian territory and/or an attempt at forced nuclear disarmament will lead to a second nuclear exchange, this time directed at each other's cities: a mutually assured destruction scenario leading to a nuclear winter. President Livingston lands in Philadelphia to set up his cabinet on land and resolve the issues with the Vice President and Congress.

On the way back to Los Angeles, Melissa Chandler goes into labor. She gives birth to a baby boy in an overcrowded hospital in Palm Springs. In the aftermath of the nuclear attack, drinking water and food have become scarce across the United States.

Congress orders an investigation into the causes of the war and calls a number of witnesses, including National Security Advisor Greg Lambert, to the Greenbrier facilities to testify before the select committee. On his way out of the bunker, Lambert asks the military for help in locating his wife and in-laws, as he has not heard from them since boarding Nightwatch. On the irradiated outskirts of Washington DC, Lambert hitches a ride on an Army helicopter and spots his wife's abandoned car on a highway. A few miles down the road, he finds his in-laws' minivan: inside are the bodies of Lambert's wife, his relatives, and Filipov's wife, long dead from exposure to radioactive fallout.

In the Kremlin, General Razov is overruled by the STAVKA staff and agrees to take a more proactive role in defending Russia, ordering an invasion of Iceland, a strategic deployment to western Ukraine to counter US forces on the border with Slovakia, and aborting the Russian incursion into northeastern China, so that Russia's best forces and materiel can be redeployed to the European theater.

=== Part III ===
Lambert refuses to answer the congressional committee's questions, arguing that the information is classified for national security purposes.

Although Livingston desperately tries to prevent an all-out war between the US and Russia, skirmishes between the two countries continue in and around Russia. After the governments of Germany and France refuse to support the US as part of NATO, his cabinet begins negotiating a new "Treaty on Euro-American Military Security" (TEAMS) involving the US, the UK, Italy, Canada, Poland, the Czech Republic, Slovakia, Hungary, Iceland, Greece, and Turkey, with Finland as a secret partner. Despite the restraint toward Russia, Livingston orders the detonation of a high-altitude nuclear warhead over Pyongyang as a warning shot to force North Korea out of its ongoing invasion. The ploy works, with North Korea notifying the United Nations of their immediate military withdrawal from the South.

The US Supreme Court, now based in Mount Weather, rules that Secretary Lambert must answer all questions put to him by the congressional committee. Again before Congress, he reveals Livingston's order to warn China of Russia's impending nuclear attack. This, along with the President's refusal to follow through on Congress' declaration of war, triggers calls for his immediate impeachment. In Russia, STAVKA decides to make any further attacks on US or allied targets contingent on Livingston's continuity as president.

With his options running out, President Livingston is notified of a secret straw vote to be held by Congress before the actual impeachment vote. If the resolution against him passes, he will order the US armed forces to a full war footing against Russia. The straw vote is a landslide for impeachment. As promised, Livingston's final act in office is to declare free-fire rules against all Russian military targets, with the notable exception of the submarines in the Kara Sea bastion. In his final moments as president, Livingston begs Lambert to stay in the cabinet to moderate Constanzo's aggression toward Russia, urging him to avoid a second nuclear exchange at all costs.

=== Part IV ===
After Constanzo is sworn in as President, the US and its allies move to invade Russia. At the same time, General Razov orders an amphibious assault on Iceland to keep a number of elite US and Canadian units from joining the main invasion force. With most of the Russian army still on the Siberian front, the western border is left lightly defended. STAVKA orders the use of nerve gas and the conscription of provisional troops to assist in the defense of the Russian homeland. Constanzo abrogates Article 5 of the North Atlantic Treaty and admonishes former NATO members France, Germany, and Norway to respect American supply lines and military facilities. As Russia's satellites are shot down by ASAT-armed F-15s, its main submarine bases in the Baltic Sea are destroyed in a conventional bombing campaign. Russia retaliates by using Tu-22M and Tu-160 bombers to knock out power plants in the western United States, plunging cities like Los Angeles into darkness.

Major Chandler's plane lands at an air base in Prešov, Slovakia, near the border with Ukraine. On his first day in a war zone, Chandler manages to kill two of his men in an unmarked minefield. After surviving a Russian chemical bombardment, he is ordered by Colonel Harkness, the regional commander of US forces, to take command of an armored battalion, despite Chandler's protests to be transferred to an intelligence unit.

With Washington, DC, contaminated by nuclear fallout, the US government organizes a provisional capital in Philadelphia, formally transferring most functions and personnel from the bunkers and Nightwatch. National Security Advisor Gregory Lambert becomes famous among a wary civilian population for his congressional testimony against Livingston and the loss of his family in the nuclear attack.

In the Kremlin, Filipov is ordered by Razov to travel to the United States and meet with his friend Lambert (under the pretext of looking for his wife) to warn him of the orders received by the ballistic missile submarines in the Kara Sea bastion. After a debriefing at a CIA safe house in Philadelphia, Lambert tells Filipov that his wife died in the attack. In a meeting with the Principals Committee, President Constanzo reviews Filipov's taped statement. The Joint Chiefs, along with the Directors of the CIA and NSA, believe that the so-called "Kara Sea Submarine Bastion Threat" is a bluff, arguing that a dead-hand order is inconsistent with both Russia's top-down military doctrine and game theory scenarios.

The US and its allies rapidly advance in two prongs from their staging areas in Central Europe into the heart of European Russia. Despite the surrender of forces in Ukraine and Belarus, and the Polish-led northern prong advancing as planned, the southern prong stalls near Prešov due to heavy resistance from the Russian 8th Guards Army. The potential for a protracted land war prompt the Federal Reserve and Treasury to warn President Constanzo that there is a very high probability that large portions of the civilian population abandoning the major cities in fear of a second nuclear exchange will cause an economic depression of unprecedented proportions in the coming months unless civilian economic activity is normalized. As such, Constanzo signs an executive order to force all civilian employees back to their jobs. Lambert also proposes a previously rejected plan to open a third front in northwestern Russia, with amphibious landings in Karelia that could reach Moscow before the end of the year. Supported by Finnish forces, the amphibious assault is successful, as Russian forces in the area are unable to respond in time to prevent a possible Allied encirclement of Saint Petersburg.

In the Russian Far East, US Marines stage a landing on Primorye, forcing the Russian troops still in transit (deployed around China to meet this new invasion) to transfer to European Russia instead. Despite heavy losses, the US takes Vladivostok and destroy several sections of the Trans-Siberian Railway. After the Japanese Self-Defense Forces occupy the Kuril Islands, Sakhalin and other Siberian regions declare their secession from Moscow's control.

General Razov calls the US television networks to address the United States directly, warning its citizens that if allied forces break through Moscow's ring motorway, Russia's ballistic missile submarines will be ordered to attack all major US population centers. The announcement sparks panic across the United States, with cities deserted at a critical economic moment. In Los Angeles, Melissa Chandler decides to evacuate the city, fearing for her life and that of her newborn son. In addition to the televised speech and Filipov's debriefing in Philadelphia, the CIA received the same information from a well-placed HUMINT source with ties to the Russian leadership, codenamed "Damocles," whom Lambert suspects is Filipov. The CIA and NSA analysts maintain their argument to President Constanzo that everything they have received from Russia about "Bastion" is a planned maskirovka operation by STAVKA to maintain its nuclear counterforce capability. However, the military officers are becoming more aware of the potential risk that the conflict escalates further.

As US and allied forces approach Moscow, the "Damocles" source continues to feed information to the US, including reports that Russian forces are preparing for a long and protracted nuclear war of attrition against the occupying forces. President Constanzo, searching for a way to end the war, orders Lambert to meet personally with Razov in Moscow to offer him a peace treaty. Russia would surrender its nuclear arsenal in exchange for a five-year period (renewable based on political conditions) under the American "nuclear umbrella," respect for Russia's pre-war borders, the rearmament of its conventional forces, and the scheduled withdrawal of American and allied troops from European Russia. Lambert would have two hours to come to an agreement. If, after the deadline, he goes incommunicado or is deemed to be under duress, US forces will receive orders to attack both Moscow and the Kara Sea submarine bastion, followed by the destruction of all major metropolitan areas in Russia with nuclear demolition munitions.

=== Part V ===
While Lambert crosses the Moscow front line under a white flag to meet with Filipov, the other members of STAVKA depose General Razov. After Lambert and Filipov are informed of the impromptu coup, the latter sets out to rescue Razov. Filipov's vehicles intercept the convoy carrying Razov and his entourage outside Lefortovo Prison. Lambert offers Razov the US terms for a cease-fire, and Razov personally agrees. As Lambert's deadline passes, President Constanzo orders the attack on Moscow and the Kara Sea Bastion to begin immediately.

A newly promoted Lieutenant Colonel Chandler orders his armored task force to breach the Moscow perimeter. His tank is disabled by a Russian missile and he is forced to continue on foot. When he reaches an enemy foxhole, he finds the bodies of hundreds of conscripted Russian soldiers killed by American-fired chemical weapons.

Bombs and artillery cover Moscow, and Razov, Filipov, and Lambert race back to the Kremlin. As they fight their way into the bunker, Razov takes control of the nuclear communicators and enters a code. Lambert calls President Constanzo to tell him that General Razov has agreed to the terms of the truce. Razov explains to Constanzo that the code he entered into the communicator disabled the detonators on the nuclear warheads on the Bastion's submarines, a fail-safe measure put in place by Gorbachev after the attempted coup in 1991 in order to prevent a nuclear civil war.

Constanzo sends orders to abort the naval attack on the Kara Sea. Most of the abort orders are acknowledged, but the cruiser USS Anzio is engaged in battle with one of the submarines and its communications are knocked out. The destroyer USS John S. McCain is ordered to sink the Anzio; the order arrives too late, however, and the Anzio fires its ASROC batteries at the Russian submarine, triggering the override orders for all of the Bastion's forces to launch their missiles. Razov assures Constanzo that the warheads will not detonate, but Constanzo does not believe him, despite Lambert's pleas. In response to the launches, Constanzo orders the US Navy's SSBNs to launch their missiles against Russia on their own orders: the detection of an electromagnetic pulse consistent with a nuclear attack against US soil.

The Russian missiles hit their targets all over the United States; true to Razov's word, no nuclear warheads are detonated. As American and Russian forces agree to a cease-fire and pull back from the fighting, Lambert, Filipov, and Razov climb out of the Kremlin bunker and onto a badly damaged Red Square. Still angry, Filipov bids farewell to his former friend Lambert, and Razov hints that he was the "Damocles" source all along.

=== Epilogue ===
Three months after the formal cessation of hostilities, the security situation in Russia worsens for the American occupation forces as anarchist protests erupt in major cities, sparked by winter food shortages.

In Los Angeles, Chandler says goodbye to his wife and child as his two-week leave of absence comes to an end and returns to Europe to take command of his armored task force.
