= Roman à clef =

Novel about real events overlaid with a façade of fiction

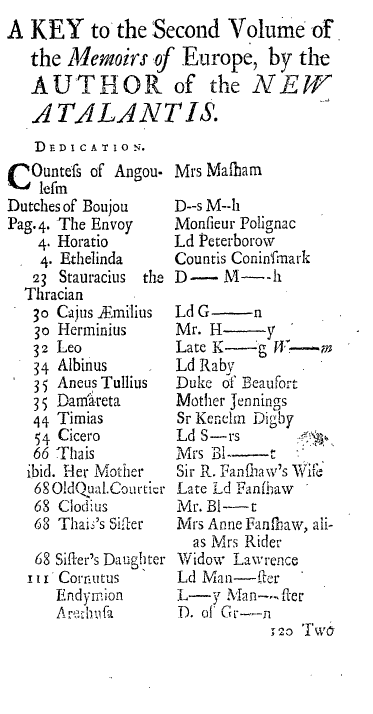
Key to vol. 2 of Delarivier Manley's Memoirs of Europe (1710)

A roman à clef (/roʊˌmɒn ə ˈkleɪ/ roh-MON ə KLAY; French: [ʁɔmɑ̃n‿a kle]; lit. 'novel with a key') is a novel about real-life events that is overlaid with a façade of fiction. The fictitious names in the novel represent real people and the "key" is the relationship between the non-fiction and the fiction. This metaphorical key may be produced separately—typically as an explicit guide to the text by the author—or implied, through the use of epigraphs or other literary techniques.

Madeleine de Scudéry created the roman à clef in the 17th century to provide a forum for her thinly-veiled fiction featuring political and public figures. An author might choose the roman à clef as a means of satire, of writing about controversial topics, reporting inside information on scandals without giving rise to charges of libel, the opportunity to turn the tale the way the author would like it to have gone, the opportunity to portray autobiographical experiences without having to expose the author as the subject, avoiding incrimination that could be used as evidence in civil, criminal or disciplinary proceeding, the ability to change the background and personalities of key participants and the settling of scores.

Biographically inspired works have appeared in other literary genres and art forms, notably the film à clef. English-language examples include The Sun Also Rises by Ernest Hemingway (1926), Wigs on the Green by Nancy Mitford (1935), The Bell Jar (1963) by Sylvia Plath, and The Devil Wears Prada (2003) by Lauren Weisberger.

== See also ==
- Allegory
- All persons fictitious disclaimer
- Author surrogate
- Autobiografiction
- Autobiographical novel
- Autofiction
- Blind item
- Creative nonfiction
- Defamation
- Gonzo journalism
- Historical fiction
- List of narrative techniques
- Non-fiction novel
- Real person fiction
- Semi-fiction
- Small penis rule
- Self-insertion
- Tuckerization
