= Patriot Act (novel) =

Novel by James Clancy Phelan

- First edition
- Author: James Phelan
- Language: English
- Series: Lachlan Fox
- Genre: Techno-thriller novel
- Publisher: Hachette Australia
- Publication date: August 2007
- Publication place: Australia
- Media type: Print (Paperback)
- Pages: 602 pp
- ISBN: 978-0-7336-2098-0
- Preceded by: Fox Hunt
- Followed by: Blood Oil

Patriot Act is Australian thriller author James Phelan second book, and the second book in the Lachlan Fox series.

== Plot summary ==
Lachlan Fox, former Royal Australian Navy Special Forces Clearance Diver, now investigative journalist for GSR (Global Syndicate Reporters) grows suspicious when several high-profile businessmen and politicians are murdered in Europe. A coup is being planned by the United States' biggest European rival, France. Echelon is under attack as the United States rushes to avoid an armed conflict between France and the United States. Meanwhile, Fox's life is threatened by French DGSE agents who wish to assassinate Fox and girlfriend Kate.

== See also ==
- UKUSA Agreement
- Fox Hunt (novel)
