= The Tin Man (novel) =

1998 novel by Dale Brown

- First edition (publ. Bantam Books)
- Author: Dale Brown
- Language: English
- Publication date: 1998

The Tin Man is a 1998 novel by American writer Dale Brown.

In the novel, Patrick McLanahan, a recurring character in Brown's books, returns from overseas conflict to his hometown, Sacramento, California. There he encounters an old enemy whose evil plot forces McLanahan to take a terrible chance as he employs experimental technology to make himself a human weapon. Using BERP armor, and (chiefly) nonlethal weapons, he attacks methamphetamine-producing biker gangs, after his brother (a rookie cop) is severely injured.

The chief technology is a high-tech battlesuit that utilizes the newly developed BERP armor. This stands for Ballistic Electro-Reactive Process and was developed by Doctor Jon Masters, another recurring character in the McLanahan series of books. This technology essentially harnesses electricity to instantly harden whatever surface it is applied to, in this case-the fabric of a combat suit. This allows it to stop bullets or other attacks as if the suit were made of steel. The only requirement is that the item being stopped must be moving at high speed. Jet thrusters in the boots also allow the wearer to jump hundreds of feet in a single leap, or to break a high fall.

In later novels of the McLanahan series, the men who use this battle armor are called Tin Men. These novels include Warrior Class, Wings of Fire, Air Battle Force, and Plan of Attack. In these later novels, other additions are made to the suit such as a powered exoskeleton, a magnetic railgun, targeting systems and so on.

== Reception ==
Bill Roach, reviewing in the Virginian-Pilot, said the turn of hero McLanahan from hero military pilot to murdering vigilante was "too much of a change for a dependable, heroic character," and that the novel "lacks Brown's usual authority." Calvin Bass, reviewing for the Tulsa World, called the novel "an enthralling techno-adventure," and one of Brown's best works. Reviewer Rankin Armstrong in the Belfast News Letter (Northern Ireland) called the Tin Man "the ultimate warrior using cutting-edge technology." He praised Brown's "descriptive powers," and "his knowledge of military aircraft and sophisticated weaponry," and recommended the book for fans of military adventure. John Birmingham in The Sydney Morning Herald (Australia) praised the crime fighting hero for his kicking of "a whole heap of white supremacist butt," even though bystanders get killed and the hero gets "tagged as a violent psychopath." The Putnam hard cover edition reached number 28 on The New York Times Best Seller list in June, 1998. The Bantam paperback edition debuted at number 13 on The New York Times Best Seller List for paperback fiction in May, 1999.
