= All Systems Down =

2018 novel by Sam Boush

- First edition cover
- Author: Sam Boush
- Language: English
- Genre: Techno-thriller
- Publisher: Lakewater Press
- Publication date: February 8, 2018
- Publication place: United States
- Media type: Print (trade paperback)
- Pages: 284 pages
- ISBN: 978-0-9944512-7-9

All Systems Down is a 2018 techno-thriller novel by American writer Sam Boush. The novel deals with a cyberwarfare attack on Western countries, focusing on three groups of characters in the United States.

== Plot ==
All Systems Down begins with a North Korean cyberattack that destroys infrastructure across Western nations, including banks, dams, and the power grid. Russia invades Eastern Europe while China and North Korea invade several US-allied nations in Asia.

The book focuses on one character in particular, Brendan Chogan, an out-of-work parking enforcement officer. While interviewing for a security guard position, Brendan recognizes danger when a computer virus strikes Portland, Oregon, destroying internet access across the city. This is just the beginning of the attacks. Soon, the country descends into further chaos when citizens nationwide lose their cellular service and electricity. Traffic backs up as vehicles are hacked. Local water systems collapse as generators fail.

Meanwhile, hacker Xandra Strandlien's boss at U.S. Cyber Command sends her to Oregon. Intelligence on Chinese–Russian joint military exercises has led to a fear of a post-cyberattack armed invasion, and the Oregon Coast, which has no military bases nearby, is a potential target.

As Brendan and Vailea struggle to secure their home and stockpile food and water, the city descends into chaos. It is there they meet up with refugees, whose storylines converge on Portland. These characters include Kelly and Orion, a pair of pilots whose Super Hornet gave out over the Pacific Ocean, and Annalore and Ireana, campers forced to cross the Coastal mountain range with their children. Both sets of refugees witnessed first-hand the invasion on the Oregon Coast — an armada of Chinese and Russian ships that have slammed into the shore near Tillamook.

At the same time, Xandra has flown across the country with a civilian pilot, Lorenzo, and his daughter Carmen. Each of the several groups has faced enormous challenges with the collapse of modern technology, fleeing and fighting as necessary, to finally converge at the home of Brendan and Vailea. There they concoct a plan not just to survive the cyber war, but to hit back against the enemy.

Kelly and Orion had spotted a Russian submarine in the Willamette River, which leads Xandra to reformulate some of the code the North Koreans used to dismantle the US Navy. Brendan, Xandra, Kelly, and Carmen jump out of Lorenzo's plane and into the river, adjacent to the submarine.

When Xandra is shot, she gives Brendan a thumb drive with the code, and with Kelly's help they sneak onto the submarine and upload the malware to the Russian intrafleet computer. The code does more damage than they could have hoped for. Not only does it disable the Russian submarine, but it also spreads across the armada.

In North Korea and in China, the hacking units are celebrating their victory when the lights in their cities go suddenly dark. and blackouts cascade across the region.

== Reception ==
The book was well received by most critics, including Kirkus Reviews which called it "a tightly plotted tale", and the Bend Bulletin which declared "The threats and situations … could almost be ripped from recent news headlines."

Positive reviews also came from Suspense Magazine, and Mystery Suspense Reviews.

== Background ==
In 2019, Lakewater Press announced it was going out of business and would not be publishing the sequel, All Threats Within.
