= Kill Decision =

Science fiction novel by Daniel Suarez

- First edition
- Author: Daniel Suarez
- Language: English
- Genre: Techno-thriller
- Publisher: Dutton Penguin (US)
- Publication date: July 19, 2012
- Publication place: United States
- Media type: Print
- Pages: 512 pp (paperback edition)
- ISBN: 978-0451417701 (paperback edition)
- Dewey Decimal: 813/.6 22

Kill Decision is a science fiction novel by Daniel Suarez, published in 2012. It deals with themes of espionage, artificial intelligence, and warfare using robots and drones. The story deals with the fictional scenario where insurgents have created automated drones that identify enemies and make the decision to kill them (the "kill decision") without human intervention.

== Characters ==
- David "Odin" Shaw: The leader of the main protagonist team of the book.
- Linda "The Professor" McKinney: A professor who studies swarming models of Weaver ants. She was targeted by the insurgents for her computer model of the swarming behaviour of ants but was rescued by Odin's team.
- Huginn and Muninn: Two ravens trained by Odin to do surveillance.
- Foxy: Team member, handles flying helicopters, planes, etc.
- Ripper, Mooch and Smokey: Team members.
- Hoov, a team member specializing in communications and audio visual forgery detection.
- Ritter: An American who is part of the group that wants drones to be legalized and funded; tries to subvert the plans of the group.
- Henry Clarke: A person who manages social media messaging for the armed forces and the US Government.
- Marta: Henry's boss.

== Plot summary ==
The book opens with a video feed from Predator drones in Karbala, Iraq, where an otherwise unmarked drone with American colors fires a missile on a dense crowd during a religious ceremony, killing many people. Repercussions of this attack are felt worldwide.

A team at the vision lab in Stanford are informed by a patent lawyer that their computer vision code has been stolen by some people and appears in public forums. One of the students then traces the spread, and observes that it initially appeared in a location in China. Just as they assemble the team to discuss this development, they are killed by a laser-guided missile.

Linda McKinney is studying the swarming behavior of weaver ants in Africa. Later that night, Linda is woken up by some noises, and is lured away from her house just before her house is completely destroyed by a missile attack. She is then sedated and kidnapped by Odin and his crew. On the way back to the USA, Odin observes a military operation in Pakistan to reverse-engineer American Predator drones. Odin realizes that it is a sham intended to implicate Pakistan for the attack at Karbala, and decides to stick to his original plan. They land in Kansas City, and then make their way to their base of operations, which is located in SubTropolis, an old limestone mine.

Linda manages to escape the base in a fire truck. She seeks protection of the FBI from the people who have kidnapped her. Ritter, claiming to be from the Department of Homeland Security turns up and takes her into custody. Ritter is unable to convince Odin to abandon his mission to prevent the widespread adoption of unmanned killer drones. Odin takes charge of Linda again, but realizes that his base of operations has been compromised. They execute their mission quickly, which is to capture one of the automated drones in Northern Utah. They manage to capture a drone just before it self-destructs, but then their plane is targeted by missiles. The team jumps off with parachutes and lands safely. Odin and Linda make their way to another base in Colorado. Soon after they land, they find that their communication has been tapped. Suddenly, Hoov is killed by a sniper, and they are attacked by many automated drones. The team barely manages to escape in a plane, but sustains many injuries in the process.

Odin and their team find sanctuary in Mexico, where they meet up with Mouse. Linda and Odin fall in love. They sneak back into the USA, and then they meet with Mordecai, who tells them about Henry Clarke's relevance to this. Odin infiltrates Henry Clarke's workspace, and intimidates him and his superior, Marta, into giving him information about the location of a relevant pheromone-making site, which is in Pakistan. The team reach Pakistan and find that a very large shipment of pheromone-making chemicals was indeed shipped there, but most of it has been processed and shipped off. They also find evidence of larger drones that can perform specialized tasks.

They go to a shipyard in China where they inspect shipping boxes. They discover that a large shipment of drones have been transported via the ship Ebba Maersk, in a path that will intercept an American Navy ship. The complete destruction of the ship by the drones is intended to convince the government to fund the companies building the drones. Odin is temporarily stopped by Ritter, but they manage to subdue Ritter. They try to fly a helicopter towards the Ebba Maersk, but find that their fuel is probably insufficient to reach it. They land on a ship carrying BMW cars, Tonsberg, and hijack it. They release the crew of the ship, but convince the captain to help them.

Linda proposes a plan of spraying themselves with the signal pheromones so that the drones think of them as friendly entities. Using this as a cover, Odin, Foxy, and Linda manage to land on the Ebba Maersk and maneuver the ship away from its target towards a rocky island. Just as they are about to escape, their supply of friendly pheromones runs out. Odin creates a diversion by throwing a canister of attack pheromones on the opposite side of the ship, and they make it out safely. The team returns to the United States, and are commended for their actions by their superior. Linda meets her father, and introduces Odin to him. Henry quits his job just as Marta's car is hit by a missile.
