= Fox Hunt (novel) =

Novel by James Clancy Phelan

- First edition
- Author: James Phelan
- Language: English
- Series: Lachlan Fox
- Genre: Techno-thriller novel
- Publisher: Hachette Australia
- Publication date: August 2006
- Publication place: Australia
- Media type: Print (Paperback)
- Pages: 456 pp
- ISBN: 978-0-7336-2191-8
- Followed by: Patriot Act

Fox Hunt is Australian thriller author James Phelan's first novel, released in 2006.

== Plot summary ==
Lachlan Fox is a former Royal Australian Navy Special Forces Clearance Diver who is living on Christmas Island after being Dishonorably discharged after a mission gone wrong in East Timor. When Fox and best friend, former Navy pilot Alister Gammaldi, discover an unusual capsule whilst diving off Christmas Island, little do they know they have discovered something that could result in the outbreak of World War III.

== Sequels ==
- Patriot Act
- Blood Oil
- Liquid Gold
- Red Ice
