= Next (Crichton novel) =

2006 novel by Michael Crichton

- First edition cover
- Author: Michael Crichton
- Language: English
- Genre: Science fiction Techno-thriller; Satire
- Publisher: HarperCollins
- Publication date: November 28, 2006
- Publication place: United States
- Media type: Print (hardcover)
- Pages: 528 (plus author pages)
- ISBN: 0-06-087298-5
- Preceded by: State of Fear
- Followed by: Pirate Latitudes

Next is a 2006 satirical science fiction novel by American writer Michael Crichton. It was the fifteenth novel under his own name and his twenty-fifth overall, and the last to be published during his lifetime. It follows a number of characters, including transgenic animals, as they try to survive in a world dominated by genetic research, corporate greed, and legal interventions.

== Plot ==
Frank Burnet has contracted an aggressive form of leukemia, and undergoes intensive treatment and four years of semiannual checkups. He later learned the checkups were a pretext for researching the genetic basis of his unusually successful response to treatment, and the physician's university had sold the rights to Frank's cells to BioGen, a biotechnology startup company. Frank sues the university for unauthorized misuse of his cells, but the trial judge rules that the cells were "waste" and that the university could dispose of them as it wished. Frank's lawyers advise that the university, as a tax-funded organization, can still claim the rights to the cells under the doctrine of eminent domain.

Venture capitalist "Jack" Watson conspires to steal or sabotage BioGen's cultures of Frank's cells. As part of his terms for financing BioGen, Watson forced the company to accept his nephew Brad Gordon as its security chief. After Brad's carelessness nearly allows one of Watson's sabotage attempts to succeed, the company takes advantage of Brad's attraction to teenage girls, and engineers his being accused and convicted of raping a minor. Watson's price for providing a defense lawyer is that Brad must contaminate BioGen's cultures. Brad's lawyer plans to claim in defense that Brad has a gene for recklessness and instructs him to engage in various high-risk activities. As part of the attempt at proving this, Brad gets into a fight with two martial arts experts and is shot by the police.

After Brad's sabotage, BioGen consults lawyers, who advise that under United States law they have the rights to all of Frank's cell line and thus the right to extract replacement cells, by force if necessary, from Frank or any of his descendants. When Frank goes on the run, BioGen hires bounty hunter Vasco Borden to obtain such cells, regardless of whether the donors consent. Vasco plans to snatch Frank's grandson Jamie from his school but is foiled by Jamie's mother Alex, whom he tries to seize instead. After escaping, Alex and Jamie also go on the run.

Henry Kendall, a researcher at another biotech company, finds that his illegal introduction of human genes into a chimpanzee years before while working at the NIH primate research facility unexpectedly produced a transgenic chimpanzee, who can talk and whose behavior is generally childlike but reverts to chimpanzee patterns under stress. The agency intends to destroy the chimp-boy, Dave, in order to cover up the unauthorized experiment, but Henry sneaks him out of the lab. Henry's wife Lynn opposes bringing Dave into their home, but their son, also named Jamie, becomes close friends with him. Lynn becomes Dave's most determined defender and, to explain Dave's odd appearance, publishes online reports of a fictitious genetic disease. She grooms him as a senior female would groom a young chimpanzee in the wild. Dave is sent to the same school as Jamie and gets into trouble after biting the leader of a gang of bullies who attack Jamie. The chimp-boy becomes increasingly isolated at school; academically, he is backward in some areas such as writing, while in sports, his classmates regard him as unfair competition.

Paris-based animal behavior researcher Gail Bond finds that her two-year-old grey parrot, Gerard, into which human genes were injected while he was a chick, has been helping her son produce near-perfect homework. While she is testing Gerard's abilities, the bird becomes bored and mimics the voices and other sounds of her husband having sex in their home with another woman. After a quarrel, Gail's husband, an investment banker, gives Gerard as a "money can't buy this" present to an influential and lecherous client. The client finds Gerard an embarrassment and passes him on to another owner, and so on. Eventually, Gerard ends up in the hands of Stan Milgram, who loses patience with Gerard's loquacity while delivering the parrot to yet another owner three days' drive away and leaves the bird by the roadside. Gerard flies off, in search of more pleasant surroundings.

After a few more narrow escapes, Alex and Jamie head for the home of Lynn, who happens to be a childhood friend. Vasco anticipates this move and tries to snatch Jamie – but abducts Lynn's son Jamie instead. Dave saves Lynn's Jamie, biting off Vasco's ear and damaging the ambulance in which Vasco planned to extract the tissue samples. However, Vasco's associate snatches Alex's son while everyone is celebrating the rescue of Lynn's. While the hunt is going on, Biogen's lawyers apply for a warrant to arrest Alex, on the grounds that she had stolen the company's property, namely her and her son's cells. She has to go straight from the fight to the courtroom, where her lawyer outplays Biogen's, and the judge adjourns to check details of the relevant laws and precedents overnight. Alex and Henry discover that Alex's son is being moved to a private clinic where the tissue samples are to be taken. As they move in to retrieve him, Gerard, now a resident of the clinic's gardens, reminds Jamie to shout for his mother, who rescues him. Vasco gives up after Dave attacks him, and Alex threatens him with a shotgun. The next day the judge rules in Alex's favor and rejects the precedents as attempts to abolish normal human feelings by decree, a violation of the Thirteenth Amendment to the United States Constitution, which forbids slavery. The ruling will likely hamper research in the long run, and prevent patients from selling their tissues rather than donating them for research.

Gerard is welcomed into Lynn's home. After he mimics telephone dial tones Lynn contacts Gail, and he is reunited with her. Press commentators praise the household as a trend-setting inter-species transgenic family, and Henry is honored by some scientific organizations.

In other plot threads:

- BioGen researcher Josh Winkler's drug-addicted brother, Adam, accidentally exposes himself to a "maturity" gene that the company is developing for the control of irresponsible and addictive behavior. After Adam reforms within a few days, their mother pressures Josh to administer the gene to friends and relatives who also behave irresponsibly. By the end of the book all of his rat and human subjects die of accelerated old age.
- The staff at a hospital provide samples from corpses for use by unscrupulous relatives in lawsuits, sell corpses' bones for medical uses, and destroy records and samples to cover their tracks.
- Henry Kendall's boss Dr. Robert Bellarmino, a mediocre scientist but skillful manipulator, is also a lay preacher and slants his comments to journalists, schoolchildren and politicians according to whether his audience has religious or pro-science inclinations. He is ultimately shot by Brad Gordon at an amusement park. Ironically, Bellarmino was only at the park to look for people who might have the gene for recklessness, and Gordon was only there to bolster the evidence for his lawyer's case that he has the gene.
- An orangutan in Sumatra becomes famous for its ability to speak obscene statements in Dutch and French. An adventurer overdoses the orangutan with tranquillizer while trying to capture it, and has to give it mouth-to-mouth resuscitation. As a result, the orangutan catches the adventurer's cold and dies from a respiratory infection. An expert who dissects its corpse finds that its throat is very human-like but concludes from the shape of its skull that its brain is pure orangutan.
- An avant garde artist uses genetic modification to change the appearance of animals, while another self-named "artist/biologist" is falsely accused of modifying turtles so that females laying eggs are less vulnerable to predators because the turtles' genetically engineered bioluminescence attracts tourists. An advertising agency proposes to make genetically engineered animals and plants carry advertisements, and claims that this would be a very effective conservation strategy.
- Billionaire "Jack" Watson becomes the victim of an extremely aggressive form of genetic cancer, and is very nearly unable to receive treatment due to others' patents on the relevant genes, giving Watson "a taste of his own medicine". He eventually procures experimental treatment, which fails to save his life.
- In a meeting, several prominent US Senators begin discussing various issues related to genetic modification, and realize that the science is outpacing the ability of the political system to introduce laws dealing with it.

The book also features news reports, many about the genetics of blondes and of Neanderthals. These two themes combine into reports that Neanderthals were the first blondes, were more intelligent than Cro-Magnon humans and interbred with Cro-Magnons out of pity, and that "cavemen preferred blondes". At one point three successive reports feature a scientist's press release that Neanderthals had a gene that made them both behaviorally conservative and ecologically conservationist, an environmentalist's interpretation of that press release that modern humans need to learn from the Neanderthals lest they too become extinct, and a business columnist's interpretation that over-caution caused the Neanderthals' extinction.

== Reception ==
=== Book-reviews ===
The review aggregator web site Metacritic gives Next a score of 48%, meaning "mixed or average reviews". USA Today said Crichton was "in top form". The Independent said that "Next is middling Crichton, perhaps because it lacks the simple suspense situation around which most of his books are constructed". The London Review of Books called it "an unintentionally hilarious emulsion of bombast and bathos", The Washington Post described it as "part lecture, part satire, and mostly freak-show", and Dave Itzkoff in The New York Times′s Sunday Book Review called it "a barrage of truths, half-truths, and untruths".

Award-winning science journalist Matt Ridley, writing in The Wall Street Journal, often could not spot the boundary between fact and fiction in the scientific aspects, although he found the almost immediate effects of the "maturity" gene implausible. He also thought that Crichton's "uncanny prescience in choosing subjects where fact will soon catch up with his fiction" was on target again, as the early hype over biotechnology has subsided and recent advances offer credible benefits.

In The Sunday Times Joby Williams called the book "more a satiric polemic than the thriller we have come to expect from Crichton", and notes that there is no central character and the story is told as a collection of distinct episodes. Ridley described the plot as "a collection of short horror stories from the biotechnology industry", and The Independent′s view was similar. The Washington Post and The A.V. Club concluded that Crichton tried to cram too much into the book and would have preferred a storyline that focussed on Dave the chimp-boy and Gerard the talkative parrot. Entertainment Weekly complained that it was hard to track over 30 named characters through intersecting sub-plots. However USA Today′s reviewer liked the story's brisk pace and thought the interleaved plot-threads came together well at the end.

The Pittsburgh Post-Gazette's Karen Carlin enjoyed the novel highly and said "You realize what he's fictionalizing could be happening now, not 'Next'. And that's what makes it all so terrifying".

Opinions about the characters ranged from "dislikable and indistinguishable" to "deliciously-vivid". The Onion A.V. Club thought the characters were barely developed enough to support the dialog and plot, and Ridley commented that in real life "most biotech executives are stressed and insecure people with mortgages" rather than sybaritic super-villains. However reviewers liked Gerard and Dave.

Some reviewers welcomed the injection of humor into the book, noting the parodies of stereotypes, and Ridley regarded much of the story as a farce. However others thought most of the humor was unintentional.

The novel has also attracted (mostly-negative) commentary from legal reviewers.

=== Sales ===
Next placed fourth in Publishers Weekly's hardback fiction bestseller list for the year 2006, and in December 2007 it reached third place in Publishers Weekly's weekly paperback fiction bestseller list. In mid-December 2006 Next reached ninth place in a United Kingdom hardback fiction bestseller list.

=== Political impact ===
The biotechnology industry magazine Genetic Engineering & Biotechnology News complained about the array of stereotyped corporate villains, and described Crichton's arguments against gene-patents and commercial ownership of genes as "the usual suspects". Although it hoped poor reviews would reduce the book's impact, it noted that two Congressmen introduced a bill to ban future gene-patents and abolish existing ones. Writers on technology-related law suggested Next and Crichton's opinion article in The New York Times may have been partly-responsible for this bill. Public interest in gene patents had previously been declining, and gene-only patent-applications were becoming less-frequent as the industry realized how much work is needed to turn a gene into a salable product.

== Character name controversy ==
Michael Crowley of The New Republic alleged that, in retaliation for his having written a negative review of Crichton's previous novel State of Fear, Crichton named a character with a small penis who rapes a baby after him. From page 227: "Alex Burnet was in the middle of the most difficult trial of her career, a rape-case involving the sexual assault of a two-year-old boy in Malibu. The defendant, thirty-year-old Mick Crowley, was a Washington-based political columnist who was visiting his sister-in-law when he experienced an overwhelming urge to have anal sex with her young son, still in diapers". Both the real and the fictional Crowley are Washington-based political columnists who had graduated from Yale.
