= State of Fear =

2004 novel by Michael Crichton

- First edition cover
- Author: Michael Crichton
- Language: English
- Genre: Science fiction, Techno-thriller, Dystopian novel
- Publisher: HarperCollins
- Publication date: December 7, 2004
- Publication place: United States
- Media type: Print (hardback & paperback)
- Pages: 641 (798 in special paperback ed.)
- ISBN: 0-00-718159-0
- OCLC: 56759026
- Preceded by: Prey
- Followed by: Next

State of Fear is a 2004 techno-thriller novel by Michael Crichton, his fourteenth under his own name and twenty-fourth overall, in which eco-terrorists plot mass murder to publicize the danger of global warming.

Despite being a work of fiction, the book contains many graphs and footnotes, two appendices, and a 20-page bibliography; all combining to give an actual or fictional impression of scientific authority, in support of Crichton's beliefs which were critical of the scientific consensus on climate change. Climate scientists, science journalists, environmental groups, science advocacy organizations and the scientific community at large have characterized the presented views as being inaccurate, cherry-picked, misleading and distorted.

The novel had an initial print run of 1.5 million copies and reached the #1 bestseller position at Amazon and #2 on The New York Times Best Seller list for one week in January 2005. The novel garnered mixed reviews, with some reviewers stating that the book's misrepresentation of scientific facts and global warming denial distracts from the story. The book is thought to have popularized climate change denial and Antarctica cooling controversy.

== Plot summary ==
Peter Evans is a lawyer for a millionaire philanthropist, George Morton. Evans' main duties are managing the legal affairs surrounding Morton's contributions to an environmentalist organization, the National Environmental Resource Fund (NERF) (modeled after the Natural Resources Defense Council).

Morton becomes suspicious of NERF's director, Nicholas Drake, after discovering that Drake has misused some of the funds Morton had donated to the group. Soon afterward, Morton is visited by two men, John Kenner and Sanjong Thapa, who appear on the surface to be researchers at MIT, but, in fact, are international law enforcement agents on the trail of an eco-terrorist group, the Environmental Liberation Front (ELF) (modeled on the Earth Liberation Front). The ELF is attempting to create "natural" disasters to convince the public of the dangers of global warming. All these events are timed to happen during a NERF-sponsored climate conference that will highlight the "catastrophe" of global warming. The eco-terrorists have no qualms about how many people are killed in their manufactured "natural" disasters and ruthlessly assassinate anyone who gets in their way (few would recognize their preferred methods as murder: the venom of a rare Australian blue-ringed octopus which causes paralysis, and "lightning attractors" which cause their victims to get electrocuted during electrical storms). Kenner and Thapa suspect Drake of being involved with the ELF to further his own ends (garnering more donations to NERF from the environmentally-minded public).

Evans joins Kenner, Thapa, and Morton's assistant, Sarah Jones, on a globe-spanning series of adventures to thwart various ELF-manufactured disasters before they kill thousands of people. Kenner's niece, Jennifer Haynes, joins the group for the final leg as they travel to a remote island in the Solomon Islands to stop the ELF's pièce de résistance, a tsunami that will inundate the California coastline just as Drake is winding up the international conference on the "catastrophe" of global warming. Along the way, the group battles man-eating crocodiles and cannibalistic tribesmen (who feast on Ted Bradley, an environmentalist TV actor whom Drake had sent to spy on Kenner and his team). The rest of the group is rescued in the nick of time by Morton, who had previously faked his own death to throw Drake off the trail so that he could keep watch on the ELF's activities on the island while he waited for Kenner and his team to arrive.

The group has a final confrontation with the elite ELF team on the island during which Haynes is almost killed, and Evans kills one of the terrorists who had previously tried to kill both him and Jones in Antarctica. The rest of the ELF team is killed by the backwash from their own tsunami, which Kenner and his team have sabotaged just enough to prevent it from becoming a full-size tsunami and reaching California.

Morton, Evans, and Jones return to Los Angeles. Evans quits his law firm to work for Morton's new, as yet unnamed, organization, which will practice environmental activism as a business, free from potential conflicts of interest. Morton hopes Evans and Jones will take his place in the new organization after his death.

== Allegorical characters ==
Several critics have suggested that Crichton uses the major characters as proxies for differing viewpoints on the topic of global warming in order to allow the reader to clearly follow the various positions portrayed in the book.

- Joseph Romm suggests that Kenner is a stand-in for Crichton himself.
- David Roberts suggests that Evans is the stand-in for the reader (who Crichton presumes accepts most of the tenets of global warming without any detailed study of it, but not unquestioningly).
- David Roberts also suggests that Ted Bradley is a stand-in for people who accept the "environmentalist" party line without question.
- Ronald Bailey suggests that Drake is a stand-in for the environmental movement "professional" activist.
- Bruce Barcott suggests that Jones, and Michael B. McElroy and Daniel P. Schrag suggest that Haynes are stand-ins for the academic community (intelligent enough to follow the debate but undecided until the evidence is presented), with Jones being the portion of the community likely to believe in global warming on less than undeniable evidence (they will accept "Likely, but not proven" as sufficient proof) and Haynes representing the part of the community that accepts undeniable evidence only.
- Michael B. McElroy and Daniel P. Schrag suggest that Haynes is a stand-in for conflicts of interest created by how the research is funded (i.e., her "official" story changes based on who is paying the bills, but in private she makes her true feelings known).
- Gregory Mone suggests that Thapa is a stand-in for the local university library/reputable Internet source verification, etc.

== Author's afterword/appendices ==
Crichton included a statement of his views on global climate change as an afterword. In the "Author's message", Crichton states that the cause, extent, and threat of climate change are largely unknown. He finishes by endorsing the management of wilderness and the continuation of research into all aspects of the Earth's environment.

In Appendix I, Crichton warns "both sides" of the global warming debate against the politicization of science. Here he provides two examples of the disastrous combination of pseudoscience and politics: the early 20th-century ideas of eugenics (which he directly cites as one of the theories that allowed for the Holocaust) and Lysenkoism.

This appendix is followed by a bibliography of 172 books and journal articles that Crichton presents "...to assist those readers who would like to review my thinking and arrive at their own conclusions."

== Global warming ==
State of Fear is, like many of Crichton's books, a fictional work that uses a mix of speculation and real world data, plus technological innovations as fundamental storyline devices. The debate over global warming serves as the backdrop for the book. Crichton supplies a personal afterword and two appendices that link the fictional part of the book with real examples of his thesis.

The main villains in the plot are environmental extremists. Crichton does place blame on "industry" in both the plot line and the appendices. Various assertions appear in the book, for example:

- The science behind global warming is speculative and incomplete, meaning no concrete conclusions can be drawn regarding human involvement in climate change.
- Elites in various fields use either real or artificial crises to maintain the existing social order, misusing the "science" behind global warming.
- As a result of potential conflicts of interest, the scientists conducting research on topics related to global warming may subtly change their findings to bring them in line with their funding sources. Since climatology can not incorporate double-blind studies, as are routine in other sciences, and climate scientists set experiment parameters, perform experiments within the parameters they have set, and analyze the resulting data, a phenomenon known as "bias" is offered as the most benign reason for climate science being so inaccurate.
- A key concept, delivered from the eccentric Professor Hoffman, suggests, in Hoffman's words, the existence of a "politico-legal-media" complex, comparable to the "military-industrial complex," of the Cold War era. Hoffman insists climate science began using more extreme, fear-inducing terms such as "crisis," "catastrophe," and, "disaster," shortly after the fall of the Berlin Wall, in order to maintain a level of fear in citizens, for the purpose of social control, since the specter of Soviet Communism was gone. This "state of fear" gives the book its title.

The book contains numerous charts and quotations from real world data (including footnoted charts) which suggest mean global temperature is, in this era, lowering. Where local temperatures show a general rise in mean temperature, mostly in major world cities, Crichton's characters infer it is due to urban sprawl and deforestation, not carbon emissions.

Crichton argues for removing politics from science and uses global warming and real-life historical examples in the appendices to make this argument. In a 2003 speech at the California Institute of Technology, he expressed his concern about what he considered the "emerging crisis in the whole enterprise of science—namely the increasingly uneasy relationship between hard science and public policy."

== Reception ==
=== Literary reviews ===
The novel has received mixed reviews from professional literary reviewers.

The Wall Street Journal's Ronald Bailey gave a favorable review, calling it "a lightning-paced technopolitical thriller" and the "novelization of a speech that Mr. Crichton delivered in September 2003 at San Francisco's Commonwealth Club." Entertainment Weekly's Gregory Kirschling gave a favorable A− review and said it was "one of Crichton's best because it's as hard to pigeonhole as greenhouse gas but certainly heats up the room."

In The New Republic, Sacha Zimmerman gave a mixed review. Zimmerman criticized Crichton's presentation of data as condescending to the reader but concluded that the book was a "globe-trotting thriller that pits man against nature in brutal spectacles while serving up just the right amount of international conspiracy and taking digs at fair-weather environmentalists.". In March 2006, Michael Crowley, a senior editor of The New Republic, wrote a strongly critical review focusing on Crichton's stance on global warming. In the same year, Crichton published the novel Next, which contains a minor character named "Mick Crowley", who is a Yale graduate and a Washington, D.C.–based political columnist. The character was portrayed as a child molester with a small penis. The character does not appear elsewhere in the book. The real Crowley, also a Yale graduate, alleged that by including a similarly named character Crichton had libeled him.

Much criticism was given to Crichton's presentation of global warming data and the book's portrayal of the global warming debate as a whole. In the Sydney Morning Herald, John Birmingham criticized the book's usage of real world research and said it was "boring after the first lecture, but mostly in the plotting... It's bad writing and it lets the reader ignore the larger point Crichton is trying to make." In The Guardian, Peter Guttridge wrote that the charts and research in the book got "in the way of the thriller elements" and stated the bibliography was more interesting than the plot. In The New York Times, Bruce Barcott criticized the novel's portrayal of the global warming debate heavily, stating that it only presented one side of the argument.

In the Pittsburgh Post-Gazette, Allan Walton gave a mostly favorable review and offered some praise for Crichton's work. Walton wrote that Crichton's books, "as meticulously researched as they are, have an amusement park feel. It's as if the author channels one of his own creations, "Jurassic Park's" John Hammond, and spares no expense when it comes to adventure, suspense and, ultimately, satisfaction."

=== Criticism from scientific community ===
This novel received criticism from climate scientists, science journalists and environmental groups for inaccuracies and misleading information. Sixteen of 18 US climate scientists interviewed by Knight Ridder said the author was bending scientific data and distorting research.

Several scientists whose research had been referenced in the novel stated that Crichton had distorted it in the novel. Peter Doran, leading author of the Nature paper, wrote in the New York Times: "our results have been misused as 'evidence' against global warming by Michael Crichton in his novel State of Fear".

Myles Allen wrote:

Michael Crichton's latest blockbuster, State of Fear, is also on the theme of global warming and is, ... likely to mislead the unwary.... Although this is a work of fiction, Crichton's use of footnotes and appendices is clearly intended to give an impression of scientific authority.

The American Geophysical Union states in their newspaper Eos "We have seen from encounters with the public how the political use of State of Fear has changed public perception of scientists, especially researchers in global warming, toward suspicion and hostility."

James E. Hansen wrote that Crichton "doesn't seem to have the foggiest notion about the science that he writes about." Jeffrey Masters, chief meteorologist for Weather Underground, writes: "Crichton presents an error-filled and distorted version of the Global Warming science, favoring views of the handful of contrarians that attack the consensus science of the IPCC."

The Union of Concerned Scientists devote a section of their website to what they describe as misconceptions readers may take away from the book.

== Recognition ==
=== US Congress ===
Despite being a work of fiction, the book has found use by advocates for climate change denial. For example, US Senator Jim Inhofe, who once pronounced global warming "the greatest hoax ever perpetrated on the American people", made State of Fear "required reading" for the Senate Committee on Environment and Public Works, which he chaired from 2003 to 2007, and before which he called Crichton to testify in September 2005.

Al Gore said on March 21, 2007, before a US House committee: "The planet has a fever. If your baby has a fever, you go to the doctor ... if your doctor tells you you need to intervene here, you don't say 'Well, I read a science fiction novel that tells me it's not a problem'". Several commentators interpreted this as a reference to State of Fear.

=== AAPG 2006 Journalism Award ===
The novel received the American Association of Petroleum Geologists (AAPG) 2006 Journalism Award. AAPG Communications director Larry Nation told the New York Times, "It is fiction, but it has the absolute ring of truth". The presentation of this award has been criticized as a promotion of the politics of the oil industry and for blurring the lines between fiction and journalism. After some controversy within the organization, AAPG has since renamed the award the "Geosciences in the Media" Award.

Daniel P. Schrag, Director of the Center for the Environment at Harvard University, called the award "a total embarrassment" that he said "reflects the politics of the oil industry and a lack of professionalism" on the association's part. As for the book, he added "I think it is unfortunate when somebody who has the audience that Crichton has shows such profound ignorance".

== See also ==
- Antarctica cooling controversy
- Climate change denial
