= Daemon (novel) =

Science fiction two-novel series

- 2006 original edition, featuring the author's starting pseudonym (his name spelled backwards)
- Author: Daniel Suarez
- Language: English
- Genre: Techno-thriller, Postcyberpunk, Social science fiction
- Publisher: Verdugo Press
- Publication date: December 1, 2006
- Publication place: United States
- Media type: Print (Paperback)
- Pages: 444 pp (paperback edition)
- ISBN: 978-0-9786271-0-2 (paperback edition)
- OCLC: 123420486
- Dewey Decimal: 813/.6 22
- LC Class: PS3626.E73 D34 2006
- Followed by: Freedom™

Daemon is a 2006 novel by Daniel Suarez about a distributed persistent computer application that begins to change the real world after its original programmer's death. The story was concluded in a sequel, Freedom™, in 2010.

== Plot ==
Following the publication of the obituary for Matthew A. Sobol, a prominent computer programmer and Chief Technology Officer of Cyberstorm Entertainment, a distributed persistent computer application—the Daemon—is activated. Before succumbing to terminal brain cancer, Sobol envisioned a alternative global order driven by apprehensions regarding the trajectory of human society. The Daemon serves as the primary mechanism to execute this objective. Its initial directive entails the elimination of programmers Joseph Pavlos and Chopra Singh, both former employees of Cyberstorm Entertainment who unwittingly assisted in the application's development.

The program secretly takes over hundreds of companies and provides financial and computing resources for recruiting real world agents and creating AutoM8s (computer controlled driverless cars, used as transport and occasionally as weapons), Razorbacks (sword-wielding robotic riderless motorcycles, specifically designed as weapons) and other devices. The Daemon also creates the Darknet, a secondary online service hidden from the general public which allows Daemon operatives to exchange information freely. Daemon implements a kind of government by algorithm inside the community of its recruited operatives.

What follows is a series of interlocking stories following the main characters:

Peter Sebeck, a police detective who is called in to investigate the death of Pavlos. However, when a connection is made between the two programmers and Cyberstorm, the FBI takes control, led by Agent Decker. Presumably because Sebeck is the initial authority figure in the investigation, the Daemon selects him against his will to be involved intensively in its process. The Daemon frames Sebeck for its creation as a multi-million dollar scheme and a hoax. The US government, though knowing the truth, fast tracks Sebeck's trial and executes him eight months later. Sebeck makes peace with his wife, who loves him despite the fact that Sebeck is revealed to have conducted an extramarital affair, but his son Chris remains estranged. Pete proclaims his innocence while dying from lethal injection. However, Sebeck later awakens to learn that the Daemon faked his death and assigned him the task to prove that humanity deserves its freedom from the Daemon. Joined by a fellow operative, Laney Price, Sebeck vanishes into America.

Jon Ross, a Russian hacker and identity thief, is questioned by the FBI and brought into the investigation by Sebeck. Unfortunately, traditional investigation methods are useless against Sobol's Daemon program. Ross eventually deduces that the Daemon can anticipate their every move, seemingly one step ahead of anyone who tries to interfere with its operation. Even after being named in the Daemon hoax (and put on the FBI's most wanted list), Ross willingly helps the US government to stop the program. Assigned to the NSA's anti-Daemon task force, with Agent Phillips, he barely survives a destructive attack on a government facility arranged by the violent and villainous Loki's attack on the installation. With his immunity deal rescinded, he vanishes underground with the intent on destroying the Daemon on his own.

Agent Roy "Tripwire" Merritt, a decorated FBI agent, is brought in to secure Sobol's property. Several FBI agents and police officers are killed by automated systems on the premises. A longtime military officer and expert in hostage situations, he realizes that Sobol's estate is a death trap as well as a red herring. However, his team is ordered to secure the site, resulting in all of them being killed. As the only member of his team still alive, he infiltrates the house and accidentally triggers a bomb which levels the property. Blamed for the failure, he is relieved of duty but is later brought onto the anti-Daemon task force by the Major. When Loki is revealed to have infiltrated the building, Roy pursues him—against orders. Fearful of the publicity that the chase will generate, the Major kills Merritt. Despite being an enemy to the Daemon, he becomes a folk hero of the Darknet, known as "The Burning Man" by the Darknet users, who respect him for his tenacity.

Natalie Philips, an NSA agent who is a genius workaholic cryptographer. Phillips joins the investigation shortly after the FBI does. Eventually, she is placed in charge of the anti-Daemon task force, but she finds plenty of interference from The Major. She is attracted to Jon Ross (the attraction is mutual), but she quickly states that national security will take precedence and their relationship will remain professional. Phillips objects to the murder of Sebeck to protect infected corporate systems from the Daemon's wrath. One of a handful survivors from Loki's attack, Phillips is blamed for the failure and relieved of duties.

Brian Gragg (Loki Stormbringer) is a sociopathic loner and avid gamer. At the beginning of the novel, he is an identity thief who engages in other cybercrimes. After running afoul of some hackers from the Philippines, he allows his criminal partner to be killed in his place. Loki is recruited by the Daemon which uses a deadly screening process that involves outthinking a hidden game level in one of Sobol's games. Loki is the first Daemon operative and quickly becomes one of the most powerful operatives. His behavior, though useful to the Daemon, is hated and feared even by other Darknet members. His first major act is to infiltrate the anti-Daemon task force. When discovered, he quickly triggers an attack which leaves most of the people and agents there dead. He is pursued by Roy Merritt, as he escapes and witnesses the Major executing Roy, vowing to kill the Major for betraying his own man.

The Major, unnamed throughout the series, is introduced as a secret United States Department of Defense liaison assigned to the anti-Daemon task force. Soon, everyone who encounters him realizes that his history is checkered, and his loyalty remains with the military-industrial complex under attack by the Daemon. When Loki massacres the task force, the Major contains the situation by destroying all evidence (including leveling the building) and personally executing Roy Merritt, fearful that Merritt's pursuit of Loki will attract too much attention. Realizing that they have underestimated the Daemon and its network, the Major retreats and prepares to wage a secret war against the Daemon and its agents.

Anji Anderson is a recently fired reporter, whose good looks have hindered her career for years. Having been relegated to fluff pieces and put on the air to be pretty, she is dissatisfied. Recruited as a Daemon operative, she is tasked with investigating stories that benefit the Daemon and help push its propaganda. Her main effect in the story is to help frame Sebeck. She eventually becomes the spokesman for the Daemon.

Charles Mosely is a former drug dealer and convicted killer recruited by the Daemon, which helps him to escape prison by transferring him first to minimum security and then releasing him altogether. With a new identity, he travels to a Daemon-controlled office where he is interrogated by the Daemon's artificial intelligence and is deemed acceptable to serve. He eventually becomes a security operative, assigned jobs such as executing criminals, participating in a massive worldwide assassination of spammers who corrupt the internet. Mosley's only request is for the Daemon to locate his missing son Ray and protect him. Ray is located and sent to live with Daemon agents, who will raise and educate Ray in a safe family-like setting.

== Film adaptation ==
Walter F. Parkes, who produced the 1983 film WarGames, had optioned the film rights to Daemon with Paramount Pictures, but they likely reverted to Suarez on 8 December 2012.
