= Freedom™ =

2010 novel by Daniel Suarez

- 2010 Hardcover edition
- Author: Daniel Suarez
- Language: English
- Genre: Techno-thriller, Postcyberpunk, Social science fiction
- Publisher: Dutton
- Publication date: January 7, 2010
- Publication place: United States
- Media type: Print (hardcover)
- Pages: 416
- ISBN: 978-0-525-95157-5
- Preceded by: Daemon

Freedom™ is a science fiction action novel, the sequel to Daemon, by American writer Daniel Suarez. It continues the story of a distributed, persistent computer application, known as The Daemon, that begins to change the real world after the original programmer's death.

== Plot ==
Deceased genius game developer Matthew Sobol's distributed artificial intelligence The Daemon has infiltrated the computer systems of numerous companies and governments. Many companies have surrendered, either out of fear of annihilation or because they have been converted to the system using a kind of government by algorithm. While the Daemon is a technological creation, much of the work is performed by humans, compelled by the Daemon to change the world, according to the vision of Sobol.

Connected by the Darknet, the human followers of the Daemon utilize Sobol's game engine as a base, having created their own ranking system and economy. Their online identities are incorporated to mimic a massively multiplayer online role-playing game (MMORPG), with operatives performing tasks to gain status and access to new technologies alongside help from the Daemon in an effort to advance their communities. Numerous US towns slowly join the Daemon's network as a means to improve their own situations and their society as a whole.

The rest of the world believes the Daemon is still a hoax, due to the efforts of the US government (and its allies) to appear to the general public that they are still in control. In truth, the American political and economic system is collapsing, with the price of fuel and the unemployment rate both rapidly increasing.

As with the first book, the interweaving stories follows specific characters.

=== Pete Sebeck ===
Sebeck, an unwilling Daemon operative, has been sent on a quest by the avatar of the late Matthew Sobol, one which will determine the role of freedom for the human race. Using augmented reality eyeglasses to see online Darknet items and threads, Sebeck is joined by another Daemon operative, Laney Price, and he soon learns that his quest is being monitored by the entire Darknet community.

Sebeck begins his quest meeting another operative named Riley, who introduces him to the newly growing Daemon communities, dubbed Holons, which are based on being self-sufficient, using natural energy sources and technologies, and avoiding the military-industrial complex opposed to the type of freedom that the Daemon communities want. Riley teaches Sebeck how to navigate the Darknet and to use it to his advantage. Laney and Sebeck journey around the country, witnessing important events in the history of the Daemon. Sebeck reunites with Jon Ross in Greely, Iowa, one of several Midwestern towns chosen by the elite powers for invasion and destruction. Sebeck's Darknet quest thread returns, and he and Laney follow it through enemy lines, only to discover that it is a trap laid by the Major, who has developed a means of infiltrating the Daemon mainframe and make slight alterations.

After being bound and interrogated by the Major, who offers to give him his former life back as a detective, husband, and father in return for his cooperation and information, Sebeck refuses. As he and Laney are taken to be executed via a wood chipper, Loki arrives with a pack of Razorbacks, killing their captors, and Moseley arrives to rescue him and Price. Reuniting with other Darknet faction members, Sebeck participates in the attack on the Sky Ranch that results in the destruction of the corporate monopoly and the Daemon research team.

After the fighting, Sebeck resumes his quest and travels with Laney, Jon Ross, and Natalie Phillips to Morgan's Point Cemetery in Texas. The avatar of Mathew Sobol reveals his intentions and desires for a world in which all are equal. Having seen both sides and the war that followed, Sebeck decides that the Daemon is not a threat and accepts the world's transformation. Sebeck is rewarded with an online message from his son Chris, who forgives him for all that has happened, and Sebeck happily heads home to be reunited with his family.

=== Jon Ross ===
Jon Ross, fearing both the established authority and the actions of people like Loki, has joined the Daemon community to help shape it into a thing for good. He travels to China to recruit an old friend (and former spy) Shen Liang, but Liang refuses to believe that the Daemon network is real. Using Daemon technology that cloaks his image on CCTV cameras, Ross escapes before he can be taken into custody. Ross attempts to convince Natalie Phillips to join the Daemon community, but she rebuffs him. Ross then heads to Greely, meeting Hank Fossen and awaiting Sebeck's approach. The reunion is short-lived when they learn that Greely is surrounded by private security forces.

Ross joins several other townsfolk to defend Greely, but they are outnumbered and outmatched by the heavy weapons and armored fighting vehicles of the private security forces. They are almost killed, but the virtual Darknet avatar of Roy Merritt, a Level 200 champion, rescues them and defeats the private security forces with airborne laser drones after they refuse to surrender. Ross worries that Natalie will be in danger from Loki's impending attack on Sky Ranch, Ross travels there to give her a Darknet Amulet of Protection. After the battle is won, he and Natalie join Sebeck in the last leg of his quest, preparing for a life together.

=== Natalie Philips ===
At the funeral for Roy Merritt, NSA Agent Natalie Philips is approached by Loki who informs her that the Daemon operatives attending are there to honor his memory. Merritt has become a folk hero of the Darknet, referred to as The Burning Man by the Darknet users, who respect him for his tenacity. Loki tries to show her that she is working for the wrong side, but instead, she attempts to warn the authorities. In response, Loki attacks a number of funeral attendants—but only members of Korr Security International, the private military contractor which employs The Major.

Following the funeral, Phillips is made a scapegoat and relieved of her duties at the NSA. Ross attempts to convince her to join the Daemon community, but she refuses. Phillips has a plan to stop the government from taking control of the Daemon by destroying it. To that effect, Phillips allows herself to be recruited by The Major and General Johnston. Flown to Sky Ranch, the remaining base of operations for the anti-Daemon forces, Phillips is informed of their plan to seize control of the Daemon in a worldwide operation codenamed Exorcist. After reading over a detailed report of Operation Exorcist, Phillips is highly suspicious of the relatively simple exploit in the Daemon's code that is described.

With the defeat of General Johnston's offensive against the Daemon communities, Phillips is reunited with Ross, and together, they realize that Johnston's true plan is to allow most of the world's corporations to be destroyed by the Daemon (while protecting their own assets) and using the inevitable chaos to seize control of key facilities around the globe and declare a new world order with them in control. General Johnston has no real use for Phillips other than to testify to the world the orthodox details of how the Daemon was supposedly defeated from the bogus report that she was given after the operation itself was over. However, they soon learn that Sobol had intentionally left fake errors in the Daemon's code and that the Daemon was many steps ahead of the private corporations, broadcasting their attempt to take over the world to the public and eliminating the personal wealth of everyone in charge. Declaring her love for Ross, together, they head off with Sebeck to witness him finish his quest and prepare for their future together.

=== Loki Stormbringer ===
Formerly known as Brian Gragg, Loki is the most powerful known human Daemon operative and is designated a Level 56 Sorcerer. Working with his personal contingent of Razorbacks along with advanced weapons and armor, he scours America looking for the Major. Though he is well known, his ranking is low for his antisocial behavior and his rude, spiteful disposition. Heinrich Boerner, the 3D avatar of the Nazi soldier Gragg defeated to initially gain the attention of the Daemon, offers to become his ally because of Loki's extremely high power level, offering to commit any act or execute any order upon the conditions of the said order being met, including taking revenge for Loki if he were to be killed. Loki accepts this offer.

Loki's first attempt to kill the Major fails when the Major escapes across water, where he is safe from Loki's machines, but eventually, Loki tracks the Major to a roadside motel. After using his Razorbacks, AutoM8s, and Angel Teeth (guided spikes dropped from above) to kill the private security team guarding the motel, he enters to find not the Major but an attractive woman being held hostage. She claims that she is a low-level Daemon operative captured on a mission to deliver a valuable Darknet power ring. When Loki puts the ring on in an attempt to steal it, the ring injects Loki with a paralytic serum; he kills the girl with a blast of lightning before falling to the ground. Before falling unconscious, he sees several more men enter the room and destroy his Razorbacks, which he is unable to control, and he is captured by the Major.

Brought to a stable, Loki is stripped nude and tortured by the Major and removed from the Daemon's network. All Loki's biometric markers are painfully cut off: tongue, eyes and finger tips. However, it is later revealed that he was eventually rescued by the avatar of Boerner and implanted with cybernetic eyes, fingers and a hypersonic speech module. He rescues Sebeck from being killed and then uses his Darknet power to dispatch an enormous army of AutoM8s and Razorbacks to level Sky Ranch, hellbent on killing the Major.

After defeating the perimeter guard, his brutal assault on everyone at the Sky Ranch (including civilians) incurs the ire of the entire Daemon community. After Loki receives a large amount of negative ratings, the avatar of Roy Merritt arrives and attempts to reason with him to stop the killing. Loki refuses, so Merritt uses his power to demote Loki to just level 10. Emotionally ruined and with all of his power taken away, Loki collapses, but his fellow Daemon members reach out to help him.

=== Hank Fossen ===
Hank Fossen is a third-generation farmer from Greely, who is recruited into the Daemon network by his daughter Jenna. Fighting a nuisance lawsuit against a company Halperin Organix, which has been illegally planting seeds on his property to create patent violations, Hank learns of Jenna's participation with a suspicious group in town. Jenna reveals the concept of the Daemon to Hank and promises that Halperin Organix's lawsuit will be dismissed now that they have gained "level 4 legal protection."

An assault on their farm by mercenaries is thwarted by Ross and other Daemon operatives, but upon learning about the impending assault on Greely, Hank sends Jenna and his wife to a predetermined shelter and then tries to help make a stand with Ross and the local Sheriff. Hank is killed in the assault, but his sacrifice is not in vain. Using a community-created 3D avatar of Roy Merritt to coordinate a counterattack, the holon of Greely is able to defeat the assault force.

=== The Major ===
The Major becomes the most wanted man in the Daemon community for his numerous crimes including the murder of Roy Merritt. An old hand at suppressing third world countries, the Major continues to make plans against the Daemon. He ruminates about his past as an instrument of big corporations, killing people who have threatened their exploitation of foreign countries. He escapes an attempt on his life by Loki, but the experience makes the Major realize that he may not win this war.

In battling the Daemon, the government has been forced into a difficult alliance with private corporations employing the Major, giving rise to private armies who use the cover of night and corporate propaganda to create a state of fear. Intensifying his efforts the Major has dispatched foreign bought mercenaries and uses the corporate media to lie to the general public.

Developing a way to penetrate the Darknet by recruiting homeless teenagers, he eventually traps Loki, taking him prisoner. He tortures Loki both for revenge and so that the Major can steal his identity within the Darknet. He later heads the Midwestern offensive from Sky Ranch while simultaneously capturing Sebeck. After a speech in which he notes that the general population needs to be controlled by a ruling class, he orders Sebeck to be killed to keep the cover story of his past "execution".

After the Major's plans collapse, he hides in a secret bomb shelter at Sky Ranch and awaits a chance to escape. Ten days after the defeat of his forces, the Major heads above ground using Loki's stolen identity, only to discover that he is surrounded by both Razorbacks and the 3D avatar of Boerner.

The novel ends with his inevitable death and the start of a new world.
