= Fatal Terrain =

1997 novel by Dale Brown

- First edition
- Author: Dale Brown
- Language: English
- Subject: Air Combat, Espionage
- Publisher: G. P. Putnam's Sons
- Publication date: July 1, 1997
- Publication place: United States
- Media type: Hardcovers, paperback
- ISBN: 978-0002254526
- Preceded by: Shadows Of Steel
- Followed by: The Tin Man

Fatal Terrain is a 1997 techno-thriller novel written by Dale Brown. It is set a few weeks after the ending of Shadows of Steel. The title of the book is taken off one of Sun Tzu's passages in The Art of War:

Where if one fights with intensity he will survive but if he does not fight with intensity he will perish, it is 'fatal terrain.' On fatal terrain, always engage in battle.

== Plot ==
Taiwanese politicians vote to declare independence from China in early June 1997 and the US immediately recognizes Taiwan as a sovereign state. However, Beijing does not take the declaration lightly and plans offensive operations to reimpose the one-China policy, with the initial swing led by the PLAN's deployment of the aircraft carrier Mao Zedong.

Meanwhile, the US government authorizes a covert deployment of two EB-52 Megafortresses to patrol over the Taiwan Strait and keep watch on the situation. Lt. General Bradley Elliott successfully reorganizes the survivors of the original Old Dog crew for the operation as part of a plan to pitch the Megafortress as new aircraft for the US Air Force. A stand-off between a Taiwanese Navy frigate and the Mao Zedong task force escalates as the Old Dog crew is forced to intervene.

The battle opens an opportunity for the Chinese to wage an international public-relations campaign to paint the US and Taiwan as the aggressors. Chinese Admiral Sun Ji Guoming uses Sun Tzu's lessons on deception to give the campaign added leverage. His schemes include launching torpedoes against the Mao Zedong and frame the attack on the Taiwanese submarine Hai Hu shadowing it in Hong Kong harbor, disguising a ferry as a cruiser to provoke an attack by the Megafortress, and detonating a suitcase nuke on the USS Independence as it steams out of Japan for deployment to the Taiwan Strait. Sun uses the success of his deception operation to launch a massive air campaign against Taiwan, starting off with nuclear-tipped SAMs fired on Taiwanese F-16s attacking a naval base in Fujian province. The Chinese attacks on Taiwan – with nuclear weapons used on several of them – prompts the US to prepare its own strategic nuclear forces.

The fallout from the events also affect the US leadership's confidence in Elliott's team while many countries in the Pacific Rim ban US warships from their waters. The US military tries to impound the Megafortress planes while in Guam, but Elliott's crew hijack one Megafortress and fly to a secret underground airbase outside Hualien, where a surviving Taiwanese Air Force F-16 unit welcomes them as the "new Flying Tigers." As Sun gloats over the success of his plan and expects the Taiwanese government's surrender, the joint US-Taiwan force starts attacking Chinese strategic assets deep in the mainland, which helps Chinese Army commander Chin Po Zihong convince Central Military Commission chairman Jiang Zemin to launch a ballistic missile at Andersen Air Force Base in the belief that it was the staging area for the attacks.

Chin, who has been disgusted with Sun's tactics that do not require an actual invasion of Taiwan, orders an attack on the secret airbase after a patrol plane follows a flight of F-16s returning from another strike before being shot down. Elliott's team and the Taiwanese planes launch ahead of the Chinese assault. At the same time, the US Navy's carrier planes and the Air Force – which finally called off its strategic forces alert – savage the Chinese planes to help the Megafortress attack the Second Artillery Corps' missile silos. In the ensuing battle, the Megafortress suffers heavy damage while destroying many silos. Elliott orders McLanahan and the rest of the crew to eject while guiding the bomber for a kamikaze attack on the last DF-5 silo.

The crew is captured by the Chinese, but are returned to the US after Sun surrenders to the Americans at Kadena Air Base and threatened to reveal the Chinese plan for recapturing Taiwan, causing Beijing to declare a ceasefire. The group – who expected jail time for going renegade – arrives at Dreamland, where President Martindale declares that it was reactivated and renamed in Elliott's honor. He also designates Eighth Air Force chief Gen. Terrill Samson as base commander and McLanahan drives off contemplating an offer to be the base's operations director.

== Main characters ==
Lt. Gen. Bradley Elliott – The aircraft commander aboard the EB-52 Megafortress, Elliott was living in retirement on the Oregon coast for months after the fiasco in Day of the Cheetah when McLanahan finds him.

Maj. Patrick McLanahan – Having taken some time off after the events of Shadows of Steel, McLanahan is selected as the EB-52's bombardier.

Wendy Tork McLanahan – Systems officer on board the EB-52 and wife of Patrick McLanahan.

Nancy Cheshire – Co-pilot and navigator on board the EB-52.

Gen. Terill Samson – The incumbent commander of Eighth Air Force, Samson supervises the Megafortress operations and later assumes command of the reactivated Dreamland base.

Adm. George Balboa – The chairman of the Joint Chiefs of Staff, Balboa spares no effort to lambast the Air Force's battle capabilities; Elliott thinks the admiral is using his position to continue an old grudge from their days at the National War College.

Adm. Sun Ji Guoming, PLAN – One of two returning Chinese characters from Sky Masters (the other being PLA chief Gen Chin Po Zihong), Sun has spent some time as the PLA's deputy chief of the General Staff. When he learns of Taiwan's declaration of independence, Sun hatches a plan to unleash China's firepower.

== Reception ==
Reviewer Jeff Popple of the Canberra Times called it an "enjoyable techno-thriller, full of state-of-the-art military hardware and simplistic right-wing politics." He said the details about technology were convincing, but said "the dialogue and characterizations are less convincing." He recommended it for fans of the genre. Publishers Weekly complained of "tinny dialogue and leaden prose" but praised the author's knowledge of military technology. The hard cover edition, by Putnam, reached number 14 on the New York Times best seller list in August 1997. The paperback edition, by Berkley, reached number 6 on the New York Times Best Seller list in April 1998.
