= Dale Brown =

American writer (born 1956)

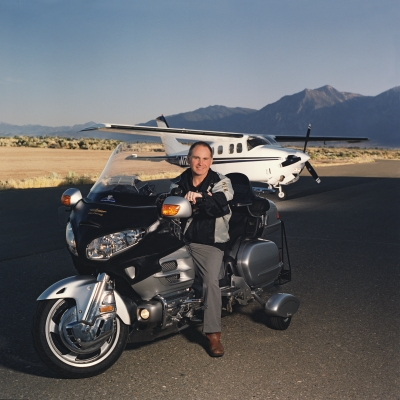
- Brown in 2011
- Born: November 2, 1956 (age 69); Buffalo, New York, U.S.
- Education: Pennsylvania State University
- Occupation: Novelist
- Writing career
- Genre: Thriller
- Website: dalebrown.info

Dale Brown (born November 2, 1956) is an American writer and aviator known for aviation techno-thriller novels. At least thirteen of his novels have been New York Times Best Sellers.

== Early life ==
Brown was born in Buffalo, New York, and was one of six children. At 15, he began flying instruction, eventually earning a private pilot's license. He graduated in 1978 from Penn State University with a degree in Western European history.

== Career ==
=== Military ===
Brown joined the Air Force ROTC while in college. He received a commission in the United States Air Force in 1978. He was a navigator-bombardier (now known as a weapon systems officer (WSO)) in the B-52G Stratofortress long-range heavy bomber and the FB-111A Aardvark medium range fighter-bomber.

Brown received several military decorations and awards, including the Air Force Commendation Medal, the Combat Crew Award, and the Marksmanship ribbon. He rose to the rank of Captain and has 2,500 hours of flight time in B-52s.

He left the Air Force in 1986, having never seen combat. He is a Life Member of the Air Force Association and the U.S. Naval Institute.

=== Writing ===
Brown's first paid writing was a review of Fort Apocalypse for Compute!'s Gazette. In 1986, while still in the Air Force at Mather Air Force Base in Sacramento County, California, he wrote his first book, Flight of the Old Dog. His novels have been published in 11 languages and distributed to over 70 countries. He published 11 bestsellers in 11 years.

Brown has been represented by literary agent Robert Gottlieb of Trident Media Group.

== Bibliography ==
Brown tends to stay with the same characters over a long period of time. Many of the characters introduced in Flight of the Old Dog are still around for the latest, although a few have been killed in previous books. Most of his books occur in the same timeline, with a few exceptions.

- Silver Tower, published after Flight of the Old Dog, a mostly independent novel with no character references, is first linked by mention of the SkyBolt module in Battle Born. However, the novel is merged into the Patrick McLanahan saga when some of its main characters and the fictional military space station Armstrong appear in Strike Force.
- Chains of Command, which features Rebecca Furness and Darren Mace, was actually a separate series, but later, the characters reappeared in Battle Born and were merged into the Dreamland and McLanahan series.
- Hammerheads focuses on Admiral Ian Hardcastle, who later reappeared in Storming Heaven. However, the book can be part of the overall Patrick McLanahan continuity because of his and General Elliott's appearances, plus the book taking place over two years since the events of Flight of the Old Dog (which is referred to in passing).
- The Dreamland series coauthored with Jim DeFelice covers the gaps between the Patrick McLanahan series novels. While most of the old characters are only mentioned in passing, some of the technology depicted in the series was later merged into the main series, starting with Air Battle Force.
- Henri Cazaux, the main villain of Storming Heaven, was referred to in The Tin Man. His own right-hand man, Gregory Townsend, would be the book's main antagonist.

=== Patrick McLanahan series ===
Brown's novels mostly center on a character named Patrick McLanahan, whose exploits as a US Air Force officer date back over 25 years.

1. Flight of the Old Dog (1987): A Soviet anti-ballistic missile laser destroys US strategic assets while the Kremlin argues the system's legality before the UN. USAF Lieutenant General Bradley Elliott recruits a team of officers to work on a modified B-52 bomber, called the Old Dog. A raid on Dreamland, itself coupled by the discovery of a B-1 Lancer strike team on the Soviet laser, forces the Old Dog crew to take the mission on themselves. In a heroic act, crewmember David Luger risks his life to save the bomber from destruction.
2. Sky Masters (1991): The pullout of US forces from the Philippines in 1994 sparks Chinese plans to occupy the Spratly Islands and Mindanao with the connivance of a Filipino Communist vice-president who declares a coup. McLanahan and the heavy bombers of the US Air Battle Force lead the American counterattack over Davao City. The novel also has a small cameo appearance by Day of the Cheetah antagonist Kenneth Francis James.
3. Night of the Hawk (1992): A simple defector extraction raid in Lithuania in late 1992 uncovers evidence that a member of the Old Dog crew, David Luger, survived the events of Flight of the Old Dog and was brainwashed to work on a new stealth bomber at a secret facility in Vilnius. Amidst the political upheaval in the country, General Elliott, McLanahan, and John Ormack join a US Marine contingent in assaulting the facility and rescuing Luger.
4. Day of the Cheetah (1989): In 1996, Kenneth Francis James—a Soviet deep-cover agent posing as a USAF officer—steals the new Dreamstar thought-controlled fighter. McLanahan and the High-Technology Aerospace Weapons Center scramble to recover it from James, or destroy it if necessary.
5. Shadows of Steel (1996): In May 1997, the US initiates covert operations to stop Iran's new carrier task force from controlling the Persian Gulf sea lanes. Now running a diner in Sacramento after the fiasco depicted in Day of the Cheetah, Patrick McLanahan is recalled to active duty to fly a B-2 Spirit mission over Iran.
6. Fatal Terrain (1997): Set a month after the ending of Shadows of Steel, Taiwan's declaration of independence forces China to go to war. The Old Dog crew is brought back to save the world from Chinese domination, but not everyone could come home alive.
7. The Tin Man (1998): A few months after the events of Fatal Terrain, Patrick McLanahan faces a new enemy, right in his home turf in Sacramento, California. The novel also introduces his brother, Sacramento police officer Paul McLanahan.
8. Battle Born (1999): In 2000, McLanahan is assigned to turn a group of Nevada Air Guard B-1 pilots into America's premier tactical air strike force. A new threat created by a sudden reunification of the Korean Peninsula hastens the training.
9. Warrior Class (2001): Set in 2001, Russian billionaire Pavel Kazakov builds a huge pipeline through the Balkans with the support of the Russian Army and everybody gets rich. To make the scheme viable, he also finances the deployment of a secret stealth fighter-bomber originally developed by the same company that employed Dave Luger. However, a new US president and his brand of leadership tie McLanahan's hands from doing anything about Kazakov.
10. Wings of Fire (2002): When Libya plots to invade and control Egypt, McLanahan and his advanced force, the Night Stalkers, are sent in to stop the chaos. However, the consequences are personal for his family.
11. Air Battle Force (2003): The US deploys a new aerial strike force into Turkmenistan to fight a ragtag Taliban army and later a Russian invasion. The humiliation forces Russian General Anatoly Gryzlov to launch a coup, especially after McLanahan's forces level the Russian Air Force's Engels Air Force Base.
12. Plan of Attack (2004): Out of revenge for what happened in Air Battle Force, General Gryzlov orders a nuclear bomber strike against the United States, eliminating nearly all of its land-based strategic forces. Demoted to brigadier general and reassigned off the Air Battle Force after defying one order too many in Turkmenistan, McLanahan tries to convince the Air Force leadership about the threat. When the Russians attack, he and the rest of the Dreamland crew take matters into their own hands to save what is left of America.
13. Strike Force (2007): Three years after the events of Plan of Attack, now–Lieutenant General McLanahan uses new XR-A9 Black Stallion spaceplanes to intervene during a new crisis in Iran, where Shadows of Steel antagonist General Hesarak al-Buzhazi has launched a rebellion against the fundamentalist regime.
14. Shadow Command (2008): Set in 2009, the novel pits McLanahan and his team against a new US president, Joseph Gardner, who connives with Russia to take him down.
15. Rogue Forces (2009): Reverting to the private sector, Patrick McLanahan and former US President Kevin Martindale operate their own private military company (PMC), Scion Aviation International. Their latest contract: stabilizing Iraq as US forces withdraw from the country. However, Kurdish raids into Turkey force Ankara to unleash its arsenal of former US aircraft against the rebels and McLanahan's team is caught in the crossfire.
16. Executive Intent (2010): The US deploys a new orbital bombardment system, the Thor's Hammer, with a Pakistani ballistic-missile battery hijacked by terrorists firing on Indian cities as the first target. However, some of the missiles destroys a chemical weapon, of which the chemicals injure civilians, which prompts Pakistan and nearby countries to help grant Indian Ocean access to China and Russia. McLanahan must join forces with Brigadier-General Kai Raydon to prevent war. Meanwhile, US Vice-president Kenneth Phoenix begins challenging President Gardner's leadership.
17. A Time for Patriots (2011): An economic collapse in late 2012 triggers destabilization efforts in the entire country. Now retired and flying for the Civil Air Patrol, McLanahan and his son Bradley enlists fellow citizens to eliminate a new terrorist threat.
18. Tiger's Claw (2012): China's test of a new antiballistic missile system in 2013 threatens US forces in the Pacific. Still reeling from the recession depicted in the previous novel, President Kenneth Phoenix recalls McLanahan again for combat duty—with Bradley James along for the ride after being kicked out of the Air Force Academy. The twice-retired general uses a new combined-arms concept using B-1s to challenge the People's Liberation Army (PLA), which has rolled out a massive arsenal. However, a raid into China turns out to be the elder McLanahan's last.

=== Brad McLanahan series ===
After Patrick McLanahan's death in Tiger's Claw, the series shifts focus to his son Brad.

1. Starfire (2014): Bradley struggles to live without his father by devoting his efforts to develop and launch a new orbital solar power plant that has the potential to aid space exploration. However, with China and Russia flexing their military muscle, US President Phoenix pushes ahead with the militarization of space.
2. Iron Wolf (2015): When Russia invades Ukraine to protect ethnic Russians, a small group of surviving Ukrainian soldiers provoke the Russian military, hoping for a response that will draw in NATO. The Polish government worries about Russia's aggression and hires Scion Aviation to defend them against Russia. Brad McLanahan is pulled out of his internship at Sky Masters to mold the individual hot-shot pilots of Scion into an effective fighting force.
3. Price of Duty (2017): Russia builds a new cyber warfare facility to take on the new Alliance of Free Nations, and Scion's Iron Wolf team must work to protect the Alliance from Russia's ambitions to bring back the old Soviet.
4. The Moscow Offensive (2018): Brad McLanahan and the heroes of the Iron Wolf Squadron—must counter a dangerous Russian strike from within the homeland.
5. The Kremlin Strike (publish date May 2019): When Russian President Gennadiy Gryzlov launches a hyper-advanced orbital weapons platform, catching the US and its allies off guard, Brad McLanahan, Nadia Rozek, and Hunter "Boomer" Noble are called into action to level the playing field using Sky Masters' advanced spaceplanes and robotic weaponry.
6. Eagle Station (publish date May 2020): The sixth Brad McLanahan book.

=== Act of War series ===
- Act of War (2005): The US assembles Task Force Talon, a special anti-terrorist unit of military personnel and police officers equipped with the most advanced combat equipment. Their first assignment: to destroy GAMMA, a terrorist group that detonated a nuclear device on a major facility run by top energy producer Kingman Group.
- Edge of Battle (2006): Rivalry between drug lords in Mexico and an increased flow of illegal immigrants across the US border heightens the tension between both countries. Task Force Talon is assigned to man a new base in southern California to combat the threat.

=== Independent series ===
- Silver Tower (1988): The US successfully activates the new military space station Armstrong in the then-future of 1992. Feeling threatened by the station's potential for US space supremacy, the USSR plots to destroy it as part of a plan to invade Iran and threaten the Persian Gulf oil reserves. It is up to General Jason St Michael and his team aboard the Armstrong to stop Soviet forces coming into the area.
- Hammerheads (1990): The US activates the new Border Security Force as part of efforts to stop drug smuggling operations handled by a former Cuban Air Force officer in cahoots with the Medellin cartel (with Patrick McLanahan and General Elliott making cameo appearances).
- Chains of Command (1993): Russian President Valentin Sen'kov plans an invasion of Ukraine in 1995. When the invasion gets underway, the US is prompted to send an Air Force Reserve F-111 unit to help the Ukrainians. The novel introduces future McLanahan saga characters Lieutenant Colonel Darren Mace and Major Rebecca Furness, the USAF's first female combat pilot.
- Storming Heaven (1994): The absence of an air-defense network on US soil prompts terrorist Henri Cazaux to use airliners covertly equipped with bombs in attacking many airports. When the danger goes national, Hammerheads protagonist Ian Hardcastle, now an admiral, is tasked with getting the network up and running to stop Cazaux's activities.

=== Short stories ===
- "Leadership Material" (2001): Set in the Arabian Peninsula post-Desert Storm in March 1991, then-Major McLanahan flies with the Old Dog crew in combating an Iranian Blackjack-E, a version of the TU-160 Blackjack bomber that was reportedly upgraded with designs lifted from the Megafortress. Meanwhile, back in the US, Colonel Norman Weir, an officer on the USAF promotions board, reviews McLanahan's service record as a candidate for lieutenant colonel and recommends his discharge. However, the US president orders Weir to destroy the discharge form, saying that McLanahan has proven himself as an officer (without elaborating further). The story was Brown's contribution to Stephen Coonts' Combat war stories anthology. It has peripheral references to Hammerheads and Sky Masters (although a canonical error).

=== Dreamland series ===
Brown and Jim DeFelice have created more than a dozen Dale Brown's Dreamland books.

1. Dreamland (2001)
2. Nerve Center (2002)
3. Razor's Edge (2002)
4. Piranha (2003)
5. Strike Zone (2004)
6. Armageddon (2004)
7. Satan's Tail (2005)
8. End Game (2006)
9. Retribution (2007)
10. Revolution (2008)
11. Whiplash (2009)
12. Black Wolf (2010)
13. Raven Strike (2011)
14. Collateral Damage (2012)
15. Drone Strike (2014)
16. Target Utopia (2015)
17. Puppet Master (2016)
18. Act of Revenge (2018)

=== Nick Flynn series ===
1. Arctic Storm Rising (2021)
2. Countdown to Midnight (2022)
3. Weapons of Opportunity (2023)
4. The Devil's Fortress (2024)

== Personal life ==
In 1994, Brown resided in Folsom, California, near Sacramento, California.

He enjoys flying his plane, a Cessna P337 Skymaster. He is a squadron commander and mission pilot in the Civil Air Patrol. On the ground, he enjoys tennis, motorcycling, skiing, scuba diving, and ice hockey.

Brown is married. His wife Diane is a retired Sacramento police lieutenant and (like her husband) is also a pilot. They have a son, Hunter, and they reside near Lake Tahoe, Nevada.

=== Legal issues ===
In April 2004, Brown pleaded guilty to charges of tax fraud. He was charged with creating companies in the West Indies for the purposes of receiving tax deductions from fictitious expenses. The fictitious expenses amounted to more than $440,000, which Brown claimed on his 1998 income tax filing. He then used the tax deductions to remodel his home in Incline Village, Nevada.

Brown was sentenced to six months house arrest and were suspended after five months. He was sentenced to five years probation and were suspended after three years. His voting privileges will be restored in 2026.
