= Megafortress =

1991 video game

- Developer: Artech Digital Entertainment
- Publisher: Three-Sixty Pacific
- Platforms: MS-DOS, Amiga
- Release: WW: 1991
- Genre: Simulation
- Mode: Single-player

Megafortress (also known as Megafortress: Flight Of The Old Dog) is a flight simulation video game developed by Artech Digital Entertainment and released by Three-Sixty Pacific Inc in 1991. The game takes place in the late 1980s and early 1990s and features three distinct sets of missions: Red Flag (USAF) training exercises at Nellis Air Force Base in Nevada, a fictional series of missions during the First Gulf War, and a special mission which reenacts the plot of the novel Flight of the Old Dog.

== Gameplay ==
The game is played as a 1st person flight simulator. The player can fly the EB-52 from six stations ranging from the pilot's station to the electronic warfare officer's station.

A player earns a promotion from successfully completing a set of 5 missions. The highest rank that can be achieved in the game is brigadier general (35 missions). If the player completes the special mission known as Flight of the Old Dog, they are immediately promoted to brigadier general. However, after the player completes 99 missions, they are automatically retired.

== Release ==
The packaging illustration was done for Three Sixty Pacific by Bay area illustrator Marc Ericksen, who had previously created cover art on four battle sets of the V for Victory series, as well as their release of Das Boot.

Two add-ons were published, Megafortress: Operation Sledgehammer (1991) and Megafortress: Operation SkyMaster (1992).

== Reception ==
Reception

Review score
Publication	Score
Los Angeles Times	3/5

Computer Gaming World in 1992 favorably reviewed the game's graphics, interface, and sound card audio, and recommended it to players "looking for a game with more emphasis on strategy and less seat-of-the-pants dogfighting". A survey that year of wargames with modern settings gave the game four and a half stars out of five. and the magazine named it one of the year's best simulation games. In a 1994 survey of wargames the magazine gave the title four stars out of five,
