= Eric L. Harry =

American author and lawyer (born 1958)

- Born: December 2, 1958 (age 67); Ocean Springs, Mississippi, U.S.
- Education: Vanderbilt University (BA, MBA, JD)
- Occupations: Author, lawyer
- Spouse: Marina (wife)
- Children: 2 sons, 1 daughter
- Writing career
- Language: English
- Period: 1991–present
- Genre: Fiction
- Notable works: Arc Light and Invasion
- Website: ericlharry.com

Eric L. Harry (born December 2, 1958) is an American author and lawyer, best known for his novels Arc Light and Invasion. He has also written Society of the Mind, along with Protect and Defend.

== Early life and education ==
Harry was born in Ocean Springs, Mississippi on December 2, 1958, and grew up in Laurel, Mississippi. He attended the Marion Military Institute and the Marine Military Academy. He also attended Vanderbilt University, earning a B.A. in 1980, an MBA in 1983, and a JD in 1984.

== Career ==
Harry practiced mergers and acquisitions law in Houston, Texas as an associate at Bracewell & Patterson (now Bracewell & Giuliani), and a partner for Chamberlain, Hrdlicka, White, Williams & Martin, and as a vice president and Assistant General Counsel for Apache Corporation, a Senior Vice President and General Counsel of El Paso Exploration and Production Company, and an Executive Vice President of Acquisitions, General Counsel and Chief Compliance Officer of Sheridan Production Partners, which he co-founded upon leaving El Paso in 2006. Harry retired from the practice of law in 2014 to resume his writing career; he is due to release his next book Pandora: Outbreak in January 2018.

== Personal life ==
Harry is married to his wife, Marina and has two sons and one daughter.

== Bibliography ==
- Harry, Eric L. (September 1994). Arc Light. Jove Books. ISBN 978-0515117929.
- Harry, Eric L. (June 1996). Society of the Mind. HarperCollins Publishers. ISBN 978-0060176945.
- Harry, Eric L. (April 1, 1999). Protect and Defend. Berkley. ISBN 978-0425168141.
- Harry, Eric L. (May 2000). Invasion. Berkley Pub Group. ISBN 0425171418.
- Harry, Eric L. (January 2018). Pandora: Outbreak. Kensington Publishing Corp. ISBN 9781635730142.
