= Small penis rule =

Strategy used to evade libel lawsuits

The small penis rule is an informal strategy used by authors to evade libel lawsuits. It was described in a New York Times article by Dinitia Smith in 1998:

"For a fictional portrait to be actionable, it must be so accurate that a reader of the book would have no problem linking the two," said Mr. Friedman. Thus, he continued, libel lawyers have what is known as "the small penis rule". One way authors can protect themselves from libel suits is to say that a character has a small penis, Mr. Friedman said. "Now no male is going to come forward and say, 'That character with a very small penis, that's me!'"

In Nebraska Law Review: Bulletin, Professor Michael Conklin writes that the use of the small penis rule would be ineffective to defend against defamation lawsuits. The reasons given are that the statement that a person has a small penis can be taken as defamatory in itself; the use of the rule is effectively an admission that defamation did occur; and the libelled person need not necessarily admit to having a small penis in order to claim damages. Conklin argues that its effectiveness is that the potential humiliation of being associated with a character with a small penis may deter legal action from being initiated.

== Examples ==
The small penis rule was referenced in a 2006 dispute between American journalist Michael Crowley and American author Michael Crichton. Crowley alleged that after he wrote an unflattering review of Crichton's novel State of Fear, Crichton included a character named "Mick Crowley" in the novel Next. The character is a child rapist, described as being a Washington, D.C.–based journalist and Yale graduate with a small penis.

In response to being snubbed by fellow writer and former classmate Martin Amis, British crime writer Peter James included in his novel Not Dead Yet a villainous character named Amis Smallbone. In the novel, Smallbone's penis is mocked by a prostitute, who refers to it as "like a tiny little pencil stub". The television show QI, while discussing the small penis rule, cited Amis Smallbone as an example.

== See also ==
- Body shaming
- Defamation
- Dignitary tort
- Human penis size
