= Invasion (Harry novel) =

Novel by Eric L. Harry

- Author: Eric L. Harry
- Language: English
- Genre: Fiction
- Publisher: Jove Books (paperback); Hodder & Stoughton Ltd. (hardcover)
- Publication date: February 1, 2000
- Publication place: United States
- Media type: Print
- Pages: 567 pp (paperback); 572 pp (hardcover)
- ISBN: 978-0-515-12842-0 (paperback); ISBN 978-0-340-64894-0 (hardcover)
- OCLC: 43452285

Invasion is a 2000 novel by American author Eric L. Harry, detailing an invasion of the United States by China.

== Plot ==
The United States turns its military into a much smaller force by switching its priorities to domestic matters, starting with using the U.S. military budget to fill the gap in Social Security's trust fund left there by past Congresses and presidents who spent the money on other things, and continuing onward in the same theme.

As the U.S. is downsizing its military, China becomes a world superpower, building new supercarriers and becoming a dominant naval power, in addition to a growing economic power. Eventually, China goes down the route of conquest.

China begins to conquer Eurasia to such an extent that it reaches the borders of the European Union in the west. With most of Asia under its domination, including Japan, everyone assumes that China is coming for Europe next, but China uses a strategy of misdirection to make the Europeans think it will invade Western Europe, and it actually pins the European naval force in the Mediterranean and blockades it, which neutralizes it as a threat without the cost of invasion.

China instead throws its resources into attacking the Caribbean. The Monroe Doctrine makes the new President Bill Baker, who came to office on a pro-war platform, have to make a critical decision: to try to halt them with conventional forces or to use nuclear weapons.

The U.S. must make a decision as the Chinese invasion forces in Central America gather steam: to build traditional naval super-carriers to meet the new Chinese ones or to build highly-experimental arsenal ships that can fire thousands of missiles at once, shower its target with overwhelming force, and have a crew of only around 100 because of the extent of automation. They might be more effective but are also untested, and the U.S. does not have the resources for both. Baker decides to back the arsenal ships.

As the likelihood of invasion via the Gulf of Mexico comes, many Americans leave the exposed states. The Joint Chiefs of Staff are not sure if that is another diversion attempt and the Chinese might come from the East or the West Coasts. The U.S. President orders the military to plan for those eventualities as well. A full war economy along with total mobilization is called up, including the U.S. President's daughter.

Baker refuses to order a nuclear strike and orders the military to meet the threat with only conventional arms. He is convinced that any nuclear strike will lead to a series of escalating exchanges and will leave both countries so destroyed that neither side can achieve any victory.

Baker frequently meets in the situation room, or the Map Room of the White House, which is returned to its original purpose, to oversee plans. There is tension between the Chinese military and the civilian leaderships, and Baker tries to make a behind-the-scenes deal with the civilian leaders. Baker tells the National Security Council, "We will die as a united nation of 50 states or we will win; there will be no territorial concessions."

In the meantime, the U.S. braces for invasion.

== See also ==
- Invasion literature
