= Storming Heaven (Brown novel) =

1994 novel by Dale Brown

- First edition cover
- Author: Dale Brown
- Genre: Thriller
- Publisher: Putnam
- Publication date: July 13, 1994
- ISBN: 0-399-13931-1

Storming Heaven is a 1994 thriller novel by American writer Dale Brown about terrorist attacks on the United States.

== Plot ==
America has won the Cold War, but continues to face new dangers from terrorists. After Admiral Hardcastle warns the world about America's lack of guards against terrorism, the horrors begin. Henri Cazaux, a psychopathic Belgian ex special Forces soldier, is out for revenge against the United States. After a botched exchange of military hardware leads to federal agents swarming the airport where he was conducting the transaction, he escapes on his plane and ends up bombing a military airfield and San Francisco International with explosives, escaping via parachute in the process.

Later at a staff meeting, he then is convinced by his financial manager to attack companies who have hubs at airports, using the chaos to make money by driving down the stocks of the companies attacked and conducting options on other transportation industries such as oil and railroads. Memphis International is targeted with explosives dropped from a cargo plane leading to heavy loss of life and a major shipping company's headquarters destroyed.

Faced with the growing chaos, the President authorizes Admiral Hardcastle to help lead the operation by authorizing the military to defend airports across the nation through the use of Patriot missile batteries and around the clock air defense through intercepting any aircraft that deviates from their flight plan. After a failed attack by Cavaux's forces on Dallas-Fort Worth International and another botched incident when an F-16 on an intercept course mistakenly shoots down a TV news crew off the coast of New Jersey, the President cautiously begins to relax the strict civil emergency measures.

A tip off by Cavaux's attorney leads to a joint agency raid on his hideout in New Jersey, where Cavaux escapes in the confusion. He then heads to New Hampshire where his final plan is unrevealed: attacking Washington DC itself. Under the cover of a disguised Air Force One, the operation begins with Cavaux's forces attacking and disabling all Patriot units and air defense forces in the Washington DC area. The disguised plane then launches a suicidal run on the Capitol. A remorseful F-16 pilot, who was blamed after failing to prevent the first attack on San Francisco which lead to the death of hundreds and his wingman, rams his jet into the plane, causing it to crash and cause heavy damage in the Washington Mall area, but sparing the Capitol. In the chaos, Cavaux attempts to kill Hardcastle himself, but is stopped by the FBI director. Cavaux escapes, and reveals his final plan: using another plane loaded with explosives to fly into the White House. Hardcastle, with the help of the local mission commander, manages to shoot down the plane using the Avenger Air Defense System, just before it strikes the White House. However, the White House is badly damaged in the explosion that follows. Cavaux escapes in the chaos, but is then shot dead by his top lieutenant, who remarks that Cavaux's time is over and now it's his time.

== Reception ==
Publishers Weekly called it an "unwieldy tale of domestic terrorism," and complained of references by characters in the book to previous books by the author, as well as the author's political bias. The flight scenes were called "first-rate."

The Putnam hardcover edition reached number 13 on the New York Times fiction best seller list in August 1994. The Berkley paperback edition reached number 8 on the New York Times paperback fiction best seller list in May 1995.

== Editions ==
- Mass-Market paperback ISBN 0-425-14723-1
- Hardback ISBN 0-399-13931-1
