= Singularity (DeSmedt novel) =

2004 novel by Bill DeSmedt

- 2004 hardback edition cover
- Author: Bill DeSmedt
- Language: English
- Genre: Tunguska Event, Black Holes
- Publisher: Per Aspera Press
- Publication date: November 8, 2004
- Publication place: United States
- Media type: Print (hardback)
- Pages: 524
- ISBN: 0-9745734-4-2
- OCLC: 56103731
- Dewey Decimal: 813/.6 22
- LC Class: PS3604.E759 S56 2004

Singularity is a novel by Bill DeSmedt published by Per Aspera Press in 2004. It is DeSmedt's debut novel and explores the theory that the Tunguska event was caused by a micro black hole.

== Synopsis and publication ==
Released in 2004, Singularity is both DeSmedt's and the publishing house's debut novel. Singularity is the first novel in the Archon Sequence series about the Tunguska event. DeSmedt's second and third novels in the series are Dualism (2014) and Triploidy (2022).

On Barnes & Noble's science fiction and fantasy list, Singularity ranked fifth. On Mysterious Galaxy's bestsellers rankings, it ranked seventh.

== Plot summary ==
It is based on the theory that the Tunguska event was caused by a micro black hole. Trying to locate weapon of mass destruction, Marianna Bonaventure is an American in the United States Department of Energy's CROM (Critical Resources Oversight Mandate) who has to work together with the outstanding analyst Jonathan Knox.

== Reception ==
The Seattle Times's Nisi Shawl wrote, "DeSmedt's clear descriptions of everything from the core of a typical star to the sinister device an assassin uses to mimic a wolf's bite make it easy to follow his swiftly swooping story line". Robert Folsom praised the book in The Kansas City Star, writing, "The dialogue would be another matter; it's very scientific. But De-Smedt has managed a neat trick: Conversations are lively even though they're peppered with accurate physicist's jargon. The thriller aspect of the book helps."

The San Diego Union-Tribune's Jim Hopper called the novel "a stylish technothriller". The Fayetteville Observer said the novel was "a science fiction thriller [that] will appeal to readers who enjoy Michael Crichton". Danica McKellar praised the book in an interview with the New York Post, stating, "It's my favorite science fiction thriller. It's got everything - great characters, suspense, action, romance, and you just might learn something about black holes along the way."

Referring to how Earth's gravity could have sucked in a black hole, John R. Alden wrote in The Plain Dealer, "Singularity takes this bizarre possibility, adds a cast of exotic characters, whips in a blitzkrieg plot and bakes it all into a hugely entertaining near-future thriller. James Bond would have loved to star in a story such as this." In a mixed review, Publishers Weekly said, "The sexual chemistry between Marianna and Jonathan adds spice. Exotic hardware, lifestyles of the rich and notorious, double- and triple-crosses and a slightly rushed and facile conclusion all make a respectable if not outstanding first effort."

== Awards ==
The novel was awarded the "Gold Medal for Science Fiction" as part of Foreword Magazine's "Book of the Year Awards". It received the Independent Publisher Book Awards's "Ippy prize for Best Fantasy/Science Fiction novel of 2004".

== About the Author ==
Bill DeSmedt was an American author and software engineer.
