= Day of the Cheetah =

1989 novel written by Dale Brown

Day Of The Cheetah
- First edition
- Author: Dale Brown
- Language: English
- Subject: Air Combat, Espionage
- Published: Dutton
- Publication place: United States
- Media type: Hardcovers, paperback
- ISBN: 978-0-425-12043-9
- OCLC: 21708047
- Preceded by: Sky Masters
- Followed by: Shadows Of Steel

Day of the Cheetah is a 1989 technothriller novel written by former US Air Force officer Dale Brown. It is part of Brown's Patrick McLanahan series of novels. A number of key characters were killed in Day of the Cheetah, only to reappear in later books, as when DotC was first written, Brown did not intend to write any further books in the series. Some parts of the plot were passively referenced in Brown's 1991 novel Sky Masters, which is set two years before most of the events in Cheetah.

== Premise ==
Set in the then-future of 1996, Day of the Cheetah details the story of US Air Force pilot Kenneth Francis James, who is actually a Soviet KGB deep-cover agent assigned to the US High-Technology Aerospace Weapons Center (HAWC) at Groom Lake. His job at the secret base involves testing the highly advanced XF-34 Dreamstar, which is equipped with a thought-control interface.

James hijacks the fighter, causing Patrick McLanahan and the rest of the HAWC crew to try to recover or destroy the plane before it reaches the USSR. The Cheetah mentioned in the novel is the XF-15F Cheetah, which is an experimental service version of the real-life F-15 S/MTD, often used as the Dreamstar's chase plane. The Dreamstar is recovered after a number of aerial dogfights over Arizona, the Caribbean, and Costa Rica, but the fallout generated by the incident forces the closure of HAWC.

== Reception ==
Reviewer Newgate Callendar in the New York Times said the novel "puts us in the cockpit" and "gives us quite a ride." He praised the flying sequences, but said otherwise it was a "standard Big Book with a very large cast of stereotypes." Day of the Cheetah was Brown's first best seller as a hardcover edition, following two previous paperback bestsellers. It reached number five on the New York Times paperback fiction best seller list in June 1990.
