= Air Battle Force =

2003 novel by Dale Brown

- First edition
- Author: Dale Brown
- Language: English
- Publisher: Harper
- Publication date: May 1, 2004
- Media type: Print
- Pages: 544
- ISBN: 978-0-06-009410-2

Air Battle Force is a 2003 thriller novel written by Dale Brown.

== Plot ==
A band of Taliban fighters attacked by both United Nations peacekeepers and United States stealth planes ran by Patrick McLanahan are driven across the Turkmenistan border and unexpectedly find their ranks swelling with disullisoned Turkmen military deserters who have the potential to either reshape the goals and methodology of the terrorists, give them the manpower to accomplish a devastating Jihad, or both. Both the Russian government and American corporations seek to protect their interests in the country while also experiencing political upheaveal at home. One-term former Republican Party President Martindale and his special interest backers challenge isolationist incumbent President Thorn in the approaching election, while Russia faces a potential military coup. McLanahan and his team eventually find themselves forming an uneasy and unorthodox alliances with the most reasonable of the Taliban leaders as President Thorn succeeds in outmaneuvering a Russian commander's attempt to declare war on America and leave them on the defensive, but fails to defuse the long-term danger posed by Russia's militaristic new president, which will be felt in the next book and far beyond.

== Critical reception ==
Jeremy Magadevan of the New Straits Times described the novel as "sleep-inducing" and said readers should "mail it to a terrorist and wait for him to die of boredom".
