= James Phelan (novelist) =

Australian writer

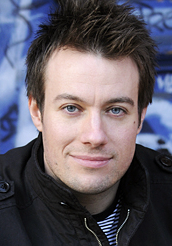
- Phelan in 2010
- Born: 21 May 1979 (age 47); Melbourne, Victoria, Australia
- Occupation: Writer
- Writing career
- Genres: Thrillers, young adult fiction
- Website: jamesphelan.com.au

James Clancy Phelan (born 21 May 1979, is an Australian writer of thrillers and young adult novels, including Fox Hunt, The Last 13 series for teens, and the Jed Walker and Lachlan Fox thrillers. He has also written short stories and the non-fiction book Literati.

== Early life ==
Phelan was born in Melbourne, Victoria, Australia. He was introduced to the world of books at an early age. He grew up on Royal Parade, Parkville, and attended Errol St Primary School, where he wrote for a student magazine. In 1995, at the age of fifteen, he began writing his first novel, Fox Hunt. After attending Eltham High School and Wonthaggi Secondary College. Phelan studied architecture at RMIT, then Creative Writing at The University of Melbourne, graduating with a Master of Arts in writing from Swinburne University of Technology while working for The Age newspaper. In 2015 he graduated with a Doctorate in young adult fiction from Swinburne University of Technology.

In 2006, Phelan was selected as one of the Cleo 50 Most Eligible Bachelors in Australia. As an architecture student, Phelan worked for two years on the Federation Square design team.

== Career ==
Phelan's first published book was the 2005 non-fiction work Literati: Australian Contemporary Literary Figures Discuss Fear, Frustrations and Fame (John Wiley & Sons). His short story, "Soliloquy for One Dead", appeared in Griffith Review's 2006 edition: The Next Big Thing. His first published novel was Fox Hunt. His first book, Literati: Australian Contemporary Literary Figures Discuss Fear, Frustrations and Fame, was released by John Wiley & Sons in 2005. It documents a series of interviews in which Phelan asked questions of a broad range of literary figures in Australia, including Matthew Reilly, Tara Moss, John Marsden, John Birmingham, and Peter Craven.

Fox Hunt, Phelan's first fiction book, was published by Hachette in August 2006. The story is set as a bridge between the aftermath of the Cold War and the war on terrorism, with Lachlan and his best friend thrown unwittingly into a war that crosses time. Patriot Act, the second installment in the adventures of Lachlan Fox, was published in August 2007. Set mainly in New York City, Washington, D.C., and France, it tells the story of Fox investigating a series of murders in Europe linked to a forthcoming hack on NSA computers. The third Lachlan Fox novel, Blood Oil, was published in August 2008 and is set in Nigeria, the US, and the UK. The fourth Lachlan Fox novel, Liquid Gold, was published in August 2009 and is set in the US, Pakistan, and India. It was during these early years as a novelist that James completed his PhD in Young Adult Literature, which lead to his next creative venture.

Phelan wrote a series of post-apocalyptic young adult novels called the ALONE trilogy, consisting of the novels - Chasers, Survivor and Quarantine - and features 16-year-old Jesse and his three close friends, who escape from a crashed subway train to find New York City in ruins after an attack.

In September 2011, Phelan released a free Lachlan Fox short story titled "Trust". It was released through Get Reading. Phelan has had two books selected on the Get Reading list of "50 books you can't put down": Fox Hunt, and Alone: Chasers. The 2013 thriller The Spy began Phelan's series starring intelligence operative Jed Walker. He also began a 13-book series of young-adult novels about a series of adventurous teenagers, who are destined to save the world from an evil being, Solaris. He claims the latter is a mix of The Famous Five and Indiana Jones, titled The Last Thirteen and they are under contract with Scholastic Publishers for publication monthly from December 2013 through to December 2014. Scholastic renewed the series, the first book titled X, for publication in 2017.

From 2013, James has released a Jed Walker suspense thriller each year, of which the world's fastest selling thriller author Lee Child has said: "Jed Walker is right there in Jack Reacher's rear-view mirror." . The Spy dealt with the dangers of "private spy" outsourcing per Edward Snowden, The Hunted was about finding WMD in Iraq, Kill Switch was about government contingency plans to shut down the internet in event of catastrophe, and Dark Heart is about refuges and border control. James has revealed that he has signed on to do a world-wide release of Jed Walker book 5, which will be a prequel going back to the days when Walker was first entering the CIA.

In 2016, Phelan was teaching fiction at Swinburne University of Technology.

== The Last Thirteen series for teens ==
- 13 (Sept 2013)
- 12 (Dec 2013)
- 11 (Feb 2014)
- 10 (Mar 2014)
- 9 (Apr 2014)
- 8 (May 2014)
- 7 (Jun 2014)
- 6 (Jul 2014)
- 5 (Aug 2014)
- 4 (Sep 2014)
- 3 (Oct 2014)
- 2 (Nov 2014)
- 1 (Dec 2014)

== Jed Walker thriller novels ==
- The Spy (2013)
- The Hunted (2014)
- Kill Switch (2015)
- Dark Heart (2016)
- The Agency (2017)

== Lachlan Fox thriller novels ==
- Fox Hunt (2006)
- Patriot Act (2007)
- Blood Oil (2008)
- Liquid Gold (2009)
- Red Ice (2010)

== ALONE young adult trilogy ==
- Chasers (2010)
- Survivor (2011)
- Quarantine (2011)

== Non-fiction ==
- Literati (2005)

== Short stories ==
- "Trust" Get Reading (2011) A Lachlan Fox short story.
- "I Am Alone" Pearson (2010) Features Jesse from the ALONE trilogy.
- "Watchlist" Vanguard (2010) A serialised novel with Jeffery Deaver, Lee Child, and others.
- "Soliloquy for One Dead" Griffith Review (2007), Affirm Press (2008), SUP (2009)
