= Flight of the Old Dog =

1987 novel by Dale Brown

- First edition
- Author: Dale Brown
- Language: English
- Subject: Air Combat, Espionage
- Publisher: Donald I. Fine
- Publication date: June 23, 1987
- Publication place: United States
- Media type: Print
- ISBN: 1-55611-034-0
- OCLC: 15488749
- Dewey Decimal: 813/.54 19
- LC Class: PS3552.R68543 F5 1987
- Followed by: Hammerheads

Flight of the Old Dog is a 1987 thriller novel written by Dale Brown. The novel's descriptions of B-52 controls and operations are based on Brown's knowledge of the systems as a USAF navigator. The flight is also recreated as a special mission in the video game Megafortress.

== Plot ==
Flight of the Old Dog is the story of a secret highly modified B-52 bomber flying into the Soviet Union on an impromptu strike mission.

The book begins with a B-52 crew during a military exercise in Idaho. Not long after, the Americans discover the existence of a Soviet ground-based laser in the Kamchatka Peninsula. Although Moscow insists that the system does not violate existing strategic accords such as the ABM Treaty, their frequent use of the laser in striking vital US assets challenges Washington's patience before the UN.

Meanwhile, Gen. Bradley Elliott, commander of the High Technology Aerospace Weapons Center (HAWC; also known as Dreamland), tests a unique B-52 bomber with the help of several young crewmembers. Called the EB-52I Megafortress (named Old Dog), the plane is being eyed as a new strategic escort for SAC forces. The technology tested in the plane is later adapted and fitted into two B-1 bombers that are sent to attack the Soviet laser after it destroys an American space defense satellite.

The B-1 mission is intercepted by the Soviets, but the aircraft are not shot down. At the same time, terrorists attack HAWC, forcing Elliott and the Old Dog crew to launch immediately. The crew push ahead with the B-1s' mission after they realize that they are the only remaining hope for destroying the laser.

After faking a crash outside Seattle and forcing a KC-10 crew in Shemya to refuel them, the Old Dog enters Soviet airspace and engages PVO fighters before and after destroying the laser.

With a number of crew members injured, and the aircraft damaged and leaking fuel, the crew realize that they no longer have enough fuel to return safely to the United States. They set down at Anadyr, a little-used Russian airfield to steal enough fuel for their journey home. Surprised in the act of refueling by Soviet forces, David Luger one of the crew of Old Dog sacrifices himself to allow the plane to take off. Despite considerable damage to both crew and aircraft and a final attack by a Soviet fighter, the Old Dog is able to make it to Alaska safely.

== Reception ==
Novelist W. E. B. Griffin, reviewing the novel for The Washington Post, says Brown had "remarkable skill for a first novelist," praising his ability to explain complex modern weapon systems and portray military aviators. He said the book deserved to be a best seller. The novel was not a best seller in hardcover, but the paperback edition sold 1.1 million copies in the first two weeks and rose to number four on The New York Times paperback best-seller list, after publisher Berkley Books sent Brown on a book tour, concentrating on US military bases.

== See also ==
- Megafortress
