= Techno-thriller =

Thriller sub-genre with high level of technical detail

A techno-thriller or technothriller is a hybrid genre drawing from science fiction, thrillers, spy fiction, action, and war novels. They are defined by a thriller style of narrative structure, but supported by an exceptional amount of technical details on their subject matter (typically military technology). The inner workings of technology and the mechanics of various disciplines (espionage, martial arts, politics) are thoroughly explored, and the plot often turns on the particulars of that exploration. This genre began to be distinguished from its parent genres in the early 20th century, receiving further developments and focus in the mid 20th century.

== History ==
The genre dates back to early in the 20th century. Invasion of the Sea by Jules Verne (1905) has been called an early techno-thriller. Many techno-thrillers are comparable to science fiction—and several modes within science fiction. The popularity of the genre has maintained itself and evolved over the years.

One of the earliest techno-thrillers is thought to be The Satan Bug (1962) by Alistair MacLean, while much of what counted for science fiction in the pre-war and early post-war Soviet Union were essentially techno-thrillers, full of technical details and featuring complex spy-rich plots, one of the most enduring examples being the Grigory Adamov's The Mystery of the Two Oceans (1939). Michael Crichton and Tom Clancy are considered to be the fathers of the "modern techno-thriller"; Crichton's book The Andromeda Strain (1969) and Clancy's book The Hunt for Red October (1984) set out the type example which defined the genre, although many authors had been writing similar material earlier, such as Craig Thomas. A brief obituary reported by BBC News credits Thomas as an early innovator, saying that fans regard him "as the inventor of the techno-thriller," and his 1977 novel Firefox has been credited with starting the genre.

== Style ==
Techno-thrillers focus strongly on details, especially on the technology, which is frequently of military origin. Techno-thrillers tend to have a broad scope in the narrative, and can often be regarded as contemporary speculative fiction; world wars are a common topic. Techno-thrillers often overlap, as far as the genre goes, with near-future science fiction, military fiction, and espionage fiction. To the extent that technology is now a dominant aspect of modern global culture, most modern thrillers are "techno-thrillers" in broad sense, and the genre is somewhat diffuse. Techno-thrillers blur smoothly into the category of hard science fiction; the defining characteristics of techno-thriller are an emphasis on real-world or plausible near-future technology. There is often a focus on military or military-political action. Techno-thrillers also overlap with conspiracy fiction and apocalyptic fiction. While techno-thrillers borrow concepts and ideas from other forms and styles of other genres, notably science-fiction and its subcategories, it is a fresh and still developing style with it being more of a hybrid genre, more closely related to thrillers and technology. Since technology is always changing, that brings a fresh take on techno thrillers with advancement always on the scope.

== Varieties ==
According to a Writer's Digest article, techno-thrillers have at least five varieties within the genre. These are military techno-thrillers, spy techno-thrillers, crypto-techno-thrillers, disaster techno-thrillers, and science-fiction techno-thrillers.

- Military techno-thrillers: These techno-thrillers focus mainly on military issues and problems. They have to do with military centralism in the story and are focused on martial technology. Tom Clancy is credited with having huge success within this category.
- Spy techno-thrillers: These techno-thrillers are similar to traditional techno-thrillers while remaining true to the pace and they borrow from spy-fi as well. The main aim of this category is to write about espionage as well as tradecraft. They have to do with defeating a rival enemy or enemies and stopping them from achieving their goals.
- Crypto-techno-thrillers: These techno-thrillers are the kind that has the story and the drama unfold most of the time online.
- Disaster techno-thrillers: These techno-thrillers usually have to do with terrible things happening such as an earthquake or any natural disaster, war and nuclear wars, apocalypse, and the end of the world themes are also prevalent. Most times, the problem is grand and affects a worldwide level instead of a local one. The goal of the protagonist is to survive instead of fixing the crisis. A recent example of this subgenre is Typhoon Fury, written by Clive Cussler and Boyd Morrison.
- Science-fiction techno-thrillers: Are heavily reliant on science fiction and are often set in the future. Techno-thrillers borrow concepts from science fiction. An example of this techno-thriller would be the science behind Jurassic Park.

== See also ==
- Cyberpunk
- List of techno-thriller novels
- Military science fiction
- Spy-fi (subgenre)
- Techno-horror
