= Later (novel) =

2021 novel by Stephen King

- First edition cover
- Author: Stephen King
- Audio read by: Seth Numrich
- Genre: Crime; Horror
- Publisher: Hard Case Crime
- Publication date: March 2, 2021
- Publication place: United States
- Pages: 256
- ISBN: 978-1-78909-649-1

Later is a crime/horror novel written by American author Stephen King, published on March 2, 2021, by Hard Case Crime. The book is available in paperback format with a limited hardcover release. The paperback edition features cover art by Paul Mann, and the limited hardcover features cover art by Gregory Manchess. The 7 hour audiobook is read by Seth Numrich. This is King's third published work with Hard Case Crime, following the release of The Colorado Kid and Joyland.

The story is told in first person perspective using Jamie Conklin as the protagonist, who has the ability to see the ghosts of dead people.

The novel entered The New York Times fiction best-seller list at number two, in the week ending March 6, 2021.

== Story ==
Set in the late 2000s and early 2010s, Later is narrated by Jamie Conklin, a young boy living with his single mother, Tia, in New York City. Jamie has the ability to see and talk to the ghosts of dead people. These ghosts must answer all his questions truthfully. When he was very young, Jamie was traumatized after a man who was killed in a car accident near Central Park waved at him, despite being dead. When he is a few years older, he also talks to Mona, the late wife of the Conklins' neighbor, Professor Martin Burkett. At the beginning of the story, Tia is the only person who knows about his special skills. His uncle Harry (Tia's older brother) lives in a care home due to having early onset Alzheimer's disease.

Tia is a literary agent, and her star client, Regis Thomas, writes best-selling romance novels. Despite losing some money in the Great Recession, Jamie and his mother are still able to get by thanks to Thomas' work. Around this time, Tia begins dating Elizabeth "Liz" Dutton, an NYPD detective. When Regis suddenly drops dead before finishing his final book, Tia fears her agency will face bankruptcy. She and Liz drive Jamie out to Regis' house, where he talks to the deceased author's ghost and tells his mother the plot of the final book. After finishing the final book, Tia publishes it to massive success and the Conklins earn much of their lost money back. Soon after, Tia breaks up with Liz after finding drugs in her jacket.

One year later, Liz picks up Jamie after school one day. Desperate to not lose her job with the NYPD, she has him use his abilities to thwart the plot of serial bomber Kenneth Therriault, who has committed suicide after planting one final bomb somewhere in the city. Therriault's ghost reveals the bomb's location. However, unlike previous spirits, Therriault continues to haunt and harass Jaime for several weeks. Jamie talks with Burkett, who tells him about an ancient ritual, the Ritual of Chüd, that he could use to combat the demon possessing Therriault. When Jamie sees Therriault again, he lunges at the ghost and refuses to let go. Therriault, terrified, promises to leave him alone. Jamie also makes the mysterious force possessing Therriault's ghost (which Jamie calls the "Dead Light") promise to come to him if he whistles for it. Soon after, Burkett dies; before departing, his ghost warns Jaime never to summon the Dead Light.

Some months later, Jamie is kidnapped by Liz, who admits she used her position as a cop to participate in drug trafficking. She forcibly takes Jamie to the mansion of Donald Marsden, a drug kingpin, who is hiding what Liz believes to be a giant supply of Oxycontin pills. Liz wants to sell the pills and use the money to start a new life. After murdering Marsden, Liz forces Jamie to ask Marsden's ghost where he hid the pills. Marsden leads them to a panic room in his library. Liz is enraged when she finds the pill supply is much smaller than expected. Fearing for his life, Jamie summons the Dead Light, which kills Liz. The Dead Light, now stronger, tries to break free of Jamie's control. Refusing to give in, Jaime retains control of the Dead Light before forcing it to leave again. After it vanishes, Jamie calls the police and is returned home safely.

Years later, when Jamie is about to finish high school, Tia tells him that Uncle Harry has died of pneumonia. Jamie travels to the care home, talks to the ghost of his dead uncle, and asks who his father is. Harry says that he is Jamie's father. Jamie refuses to ask for the details of his incestuous conception and does not say anything to his mother. Jamie tries to remain hopeful about the future but is troubled by the fact that he might develop early onset Alzheimer's like his uncle/father. This could be found out by a simple test, which, however, he wants to have carried out only "later".

== Limited hardcover edition and audiobook ==
- The limited hardcover edition of the book was published by Titan Books with 2,900 copies printed. It was released on March 30, 2021. Three editions of the hardcover were available: a Lettered Signed Edition with 26 copies, a Numbered Signed Edition with 374 copies and an Unsigned Edition with 2,500 copies.
- Seth Numrich reads the unabridged audiobook.
