= Charles Ardai =

American writer

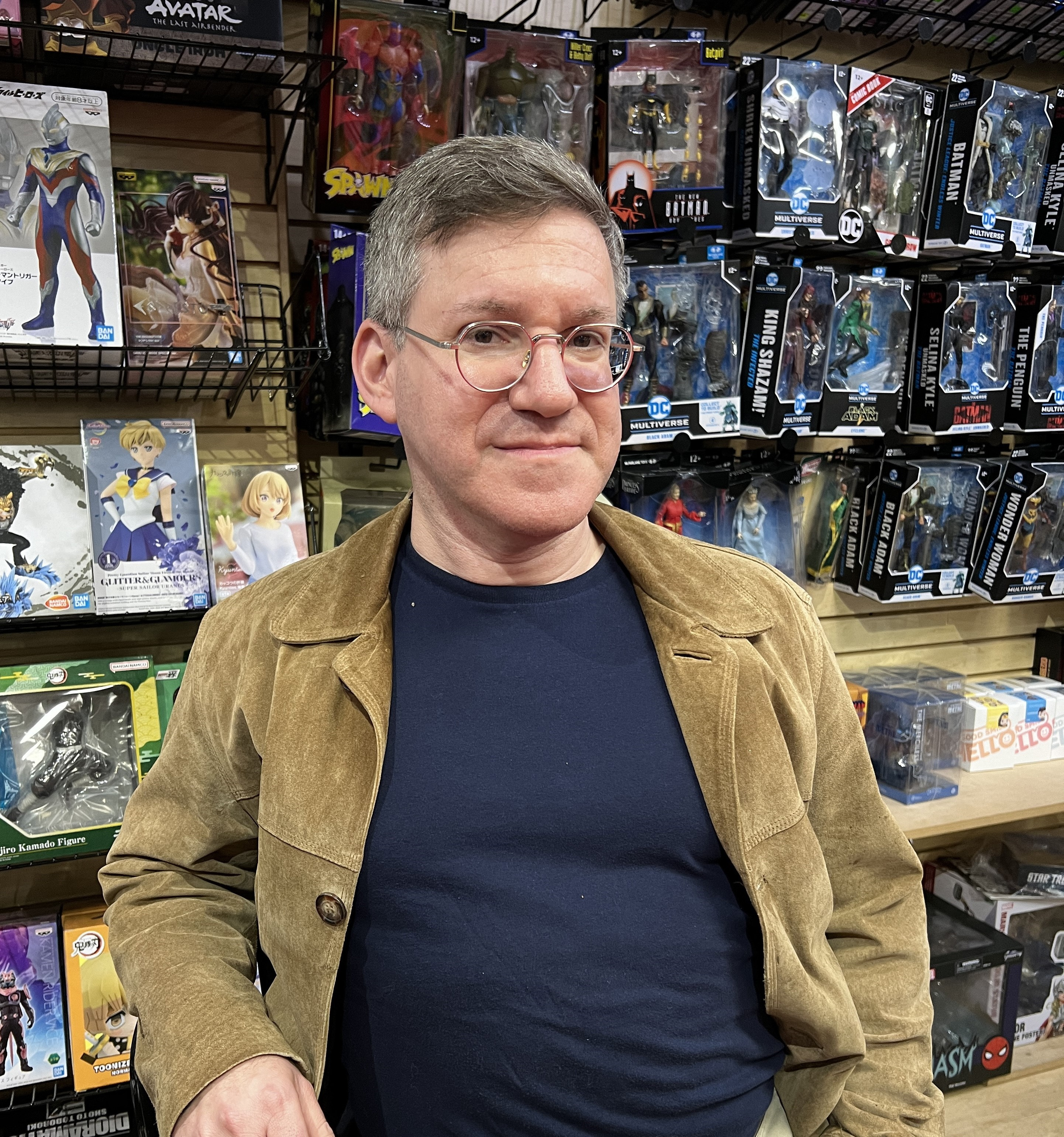
- Ardai at a Midtown Comics signing in Manhattan
- Education: Columbia University
- Occupations: Entrepreneur; writer; editor; television producer
- Employer: D. E. Shaw & Co.
- Notable work: Juno Online Services; Hard Case Crime
- Spouse: Naomi Novik
- Awards: Edgar Award (2007); Shamus Award (2008); Ellery Queen Award (2015); Inkpot Award (2024)

Charles Ardai is an American businessman, and writer of crime fiction and mysteries. He is co-founder and editor of Hard Case Crime, a line of pulp-style paperback crime novels. He was also an early employee of D. E. Shaw & Co. and a managing director of the firm. He is the former chairman of Schrödinger, Inc.

== Early life ==
A New York native and the son of two Holocaust survivors, Ardai told NPR in a May 2008 interview that the stories his parents told him as a child "were the most grim and frightening that you can imagine" and gave him the impression "there was a darker circle around a very small bit of light," something that enabled him to relate to his own characters' sufferings.

While in high school, Ardai enjoyed reading pulp fiction and worked as an intern at Isaac Asimov’s Science Fiction Magazine.

After graduating from Hunter College High School in 1987, he attended Columbia University, where he graduated summa cum laude in 1991.

== Career ==
Soon after he graduated from college, Ardai was hired by hedge fund D. E. Shaw. His first job at the firm was to set up its recruiting department, with a goal of hiring "people who really excel in one field or another."

Sometime in the early 1990s, Shaw tasked Ardai and Jeff Bezos with coming up with potential online business ideas. While Ardai founded Juno, an internet company, in 1996 with D. E. Shaw as an investor, Bezos went on to found Amazon.com on his own. After Juno was sold in 2001, Ardai and Max Phillips decided to start a publishing company to publish crime fiction in the pulp magazine style they grew up enjoying. That proposed company became Hard Case Crime, which published its first books in 2004. Hard Case's books were produced by Dorchester Publishing and Ardai's Winterfall, LLC between 2004 and 2010 and have been produced by Titan Books and Winterfall since 2011 (together with a related comics imprint launched in 2016).

Ardai's writing has appeared in mystery magazines such as Ellery Queen's Mystery Magazine and Alfred Hitchcock's Mystery Magazine, gaming magazines such as Computer Gaming World and Electronic Games, and anthologies such as Best Mysteries of the Year and The Year's Best Horror Stories. Ardai has also edited numerous short story collections such as The Return of the Black Widowers, Great Tales of Madness and the Macabre, and Futurecrime.

In 1994, Ardai's short story "Nobody Wins," published in 1993 by Alfred Hitchcock’s Mystery Magazine, received a Shamus nomination for Best P.I. Short Story.

His first novel, Little Girl Lost (2004) was nominated for both the Edgar Allan Poe Award by the Mystery Writers of America and the Shamus Award by the Private Eye Writers of America. His second novel, Songs of Innocence, was called "an instant classic" by The Washington Post, selected as one of the best books of the year by Publishers Weekly, and won the 2008 Shamus Award. Both books were written under the alias Richard Aleas and were optioned for the movies by Universal Pictures.

He received the Edgar Award in 2007 for the short story "The Home Front". Ardai's third novel, Fifty-to-One, was published in November 2008. It was the fiftieth book in the Hard Case Crime series and the first to be published under Ardai's real name.

His fourth novel, Hunt Through the Cradle of Fear, is part of a pulp adventure series he created in 2009, describing the globetrotting exploits of a modern-day explorer named Gabriel Hunt. Authorship of all the books in this series were originally credited to Gabriel Hunt himself.

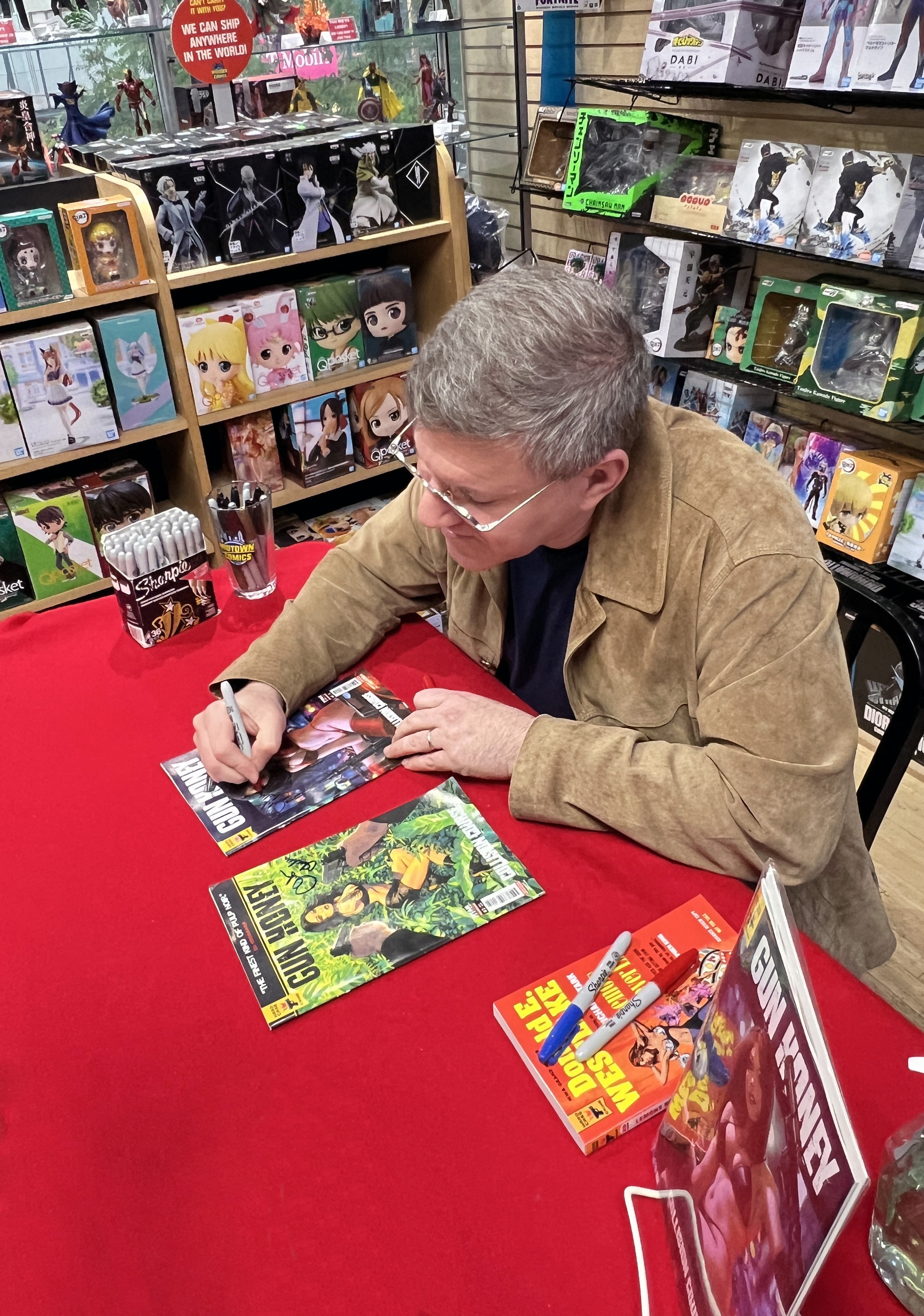
Ardai at a May 15, 2024 Midtown Comics signing for Gun Honey: Collision Course #1. Beside him is an advance copy of a reprint edition of the Hard Case Crime novel Lemons Never Lie, which had previously gone out of print.

In 2010, Ardai began working as a writer and producer on the SyFy television series Haven, inspired by the Hard Case Crime novel The Colorado Kid by Stephen King. The pilot episode of Haven premiered on July 9, 2010 and the series finale premiered on December 17, 2015.

In 2015, he received the Ellery Queen Award for his work on Hard Case Crime.

In 2016, he wrote a novel based on the Shane Black movie The Nice Guys.

On September 22, 2021, Titan Comics released under the Hard Case Crime imprint Gun Honey #1, Ardai's first written work for the comics medium. The book, which is drawn by Ang Hor Kheng, and features covers by Bill Sienkiewicz, Robert McGinnis, and Adam Hughes, centers upon weapons smuggler Joanna Tan, who after helping a convict escape prison, is chosen by the U.S. government to track him down and return him. The four-issue miniseries was conceived by Ardai when he conceived of Hard Case Crime Comics five years prior, and he has likened Gun Honey to other espionage action thrillers that influenced it, such as James Bond, as well as action/adventure stories featuring female protagonists, such as Modesty Blaise, Alias, Kill Bill, and Barbarella. At the review aggregator website Comic Book Roundup, the debut issue has a rating of 8 out of 10, based on eight critics' reviews. The story was followed by a sequel, Gun Honey: Blood for Blood, in which Joanna and her ally, a government agent named Brook Barrow, are framed for murder by a vengeful rival of Joanna's. That miniseries premiered August 24, 2022. It was followed by a four-issue spinoff series, Heat Seeker: A Gun Honey Series, also written by Ardai, with art by Ace Continuado, Jose Zapata, and Asifur Rahman. The book, whose debut issue was released on June 28, 2023, sees Tan going on the run after she is targeted for assassination by the U.S. government. Pursued by a beautiful sociopathic hitwoman named Sarah Claride, Tan seeks help from her friend, stage magician and illusionist Dahlia Racers, who specializes in helping people disappear. The next installment in the series was the miniseries Gun Honey: Collision Course, whose debut issue was released May 15, 2024.

== Awards and nominations ==
- 1994: "Nobody Wins" nominated for Shamus Award by the Private Eye Writers of America Shamus in the category "Best P.I. Short Story"
- 2004: Little Girl Lost nominated for Edgar Allan Poe Award by the Mystery Writers of America†
- 2004: Little Girl Lost nominated for Shamus Award by the Private Eye Writers of America†
- 2007: Edgar Award for the short story "The Home Front"
- 2008: Shamus Award for Best Original P.I. Paperback for Songs of Innocence †
- 2015: Ellery Queen Award (an Edgar Award category "to honor outstanding writing teams and outstanding people in the mystery-publishing industry") for his work on Hard Case Crime.
- 2024: Inkpot Award

† Written under pseudonym "Richard Aleas."

== Personal life ==
Ardai is married to writer Naomi Novik. As of 2006, they live on Manhattan's Upper East Side. They have one child, a daughter named Evidence Novik Ardai, who was born in 2010.
