= Drug of Choice =

1970 novel by Michael Crichton

- First edition cover
- Author: John Lange
- Language: English
- Publisher: Signet Books
- Publication date: January 1970
- Publication place: United States
- Media type: Print (Paperback)
- Pages: 166
- ISBN: 0-451-04116-X
- LC Class: PS3553.R48
- Preceded by: The Venom Business
- Followed by: Dealing

Drug of Choice is a novel written by Michael Crichton, as his eighth published novel, and the sixth to feature his pseudonym John Lange. It was originally published in 1970. Hard Case Crime republished the novel under Crichton's name in November 2013.

== Plot summary ==
On a secret island in the Caribbean, bio-engineers have devised a vacation resort like no other, promising the ultimate escape. But when Dr. Roger Clark investigates, he discovers the dark secret of Eden Island and of Advance Biosystems, the shadowy corporation underwriting it.

== Proposed film adaptation ==
Film rights were optioned in 1970 by the actor Robert Forster and his agent David de Silva, to produce a film starring Forster called High Synch. John Neufeld was hired to write a screenplay. "Unlike the book, our script will not have a happy ending", said Forster. "We think the movie ought to serve as a warning." However, the film was never made.
