= The Venom Business =

1969 novel by Michael Crichton

- First edition cover
- Author: John Lange
- Language: English
- Publisher: World Publishing Co.
- Publication date: 1969
- Publication place: United States
- Media type: Print (Hardcover)
- Pages: 310
- LC Class: PS3553.R48
- Preceded by: Zero Cool
- Followed by: Drug of Choice

The Venom Business is Michael Crichton's seventh published novel, and the fifth under his pseudonym John Lange. It was released in 1969 by The World Publishing Company (New York) under the pseudonym of John Lange. It was the first hard cover book from Lange.

Hard Case Crime republished the novel under Crichton's name on November 19, 2013.

== Plot summary ==
Charles Raynaud is a smuggler and he is very content and mildly successful with what he does for a living. Based in Mexico, Charles uses his exceptional skill as a snake handler to his advantage by "exporting" snakes out of Mexico under the guise of medical research—their venom is used by drug companies and universities for research. But the snakes are simply a ruse to hide the identity of the real cargo—rare Mexican artifacts.

Charles is good at what he does and his skills don't stop at smuggling. Upon a suspicious chance reunion with Richard Pierce—a long-lost acquaintance of Charles' from his school days—Raynaud is enlisted to use his other talents as a bodyguard to help Richard stay alive until such time as he can acquire the rest of his deceased father's fortune, which has been held in trust by Richard's promiscuous widowed stepmother.

Charles isn't a fan of Richard's brash womanizing ways, but agrees to help because the money is good. Only he finds out that Richards isn't the easiest guy to protect, and often he is his own enemy when it comes to self-preservation.

After a series of thwarted sketchy attempts at Richard's life, Charles begins to smell a rat. The further he probes into the situation, the more confused he gets. Things aren't what they seem. The bad guys aren't really the bad guys, or so it seems and the good guys are no better. Who wants whom killed? Who is protecting whom? In the end it may be Charles who is the target.

== Reception ==
The critic from the New York Times called the book "overlong, and it's encumbered with a welter of extraneous detail and as grubby a collection of opportunists as I've encountered in a good while." The Chicago Tribune said it "had too many subplots, too many dames".
