= Grave Descend =

1970 novel by Michael Crichton

- First edition cover
- Author: John Lange
- Language: English
- Publisher: Signet Books
- Publication date: April 1970
- Publication place: United States
- Media type: Print (Paperback)
- Pages: 159
- LC Class: PS3553.R48
- Preceded by: Dealing
- Followed by: Binary

Grave Descend is a novel written by Michael Crichton, his tenth published novel, and the seventh featuring the pseudonym John Lange. It was originally published in 1970, and later re-released in 2006 as part of the Hard Case Crime series. For this release, Michael Crichton did an overall revision of the text. The novel was nominated for the Edgar Award in 1971. Hard Case Crime republished the novel under Crichton's name on October 29, 2013.

The Chicago Tribune called it "fairly thrilling at times."

== Hard Case Crime ==
Diver James McGregor is used to exploring sunken ships. But there's something strange about the wreck of the Grave Descend. No one aboard tells quite the same story about what happened. Then there's the mysterious cargo they were carrying...

In one of the most beautiful places on Earth, a sinister plot is about to unfold. And if McGregor's not careful, he may find himself in over his head.
