= Binary (novel) =

1972 novel by Michael Crichton

- First edition cover
- Author: John Lange
- Language: English
- Publisher: Alfred A. Knopf
- Publication date: 1972
- Publication place: United States
- Media type: Print (Hardcover)
- Pages: 225
- ISBN: 0-394-47987-4
- OCLC: 262457
- Dewey Decimal: 813/.5/4
- LC Class: PS3553.R48 B56 1972
- Preceded by: Dealing

Binary is a techno-thriller novel written by Michael Crichton, his eleventh published novel, in 1972, the eighth and final time the pseudonym John Lange was featured. Crichton also directed Pursuit, a television film version. The story of both the book and the film revolve around a deadly nerve agent composed by combining two different chemicals. Hard Case Crime republished the novel under Crichton's name in 2013.

== Plot summary ==
State Department agent John Graves is investigating far-left businessman John Wright who has been acting suspiciously – unknown to Graves he has masterminded the theft of canisters of ZV nerve gas, a binary agent, and has enough of them to kill nearly a million people.

During his investigation, Graves establishes that Wright has acquired purchases of compressed gas tanks made of a flammable material – and also rented a small 19th floor apartment in San Diego where the President of the United States is due to meet for the imminent Republican Party convention.

Graves' task is made harder by inter-departmental interference (he asks Morrison, a Defense Department acquaintance, the meaning of the code 'Binary 75 / 76' found in Wright's possession but gets no answer), weak support from his manager Richard Phelps, and Wright's hacking of Graves' State Department psychological profile; Wright has been suspected of using psychological profiles against his previous opponents.

Graves follows Wright to a small local airport, where Wright meets a business jet arriving from Utah. Two large boxes are unloaded and Wright performs some unseen actions with them in a hangar. After Wright's limo leaves with a moving van following, Graves receives a call from Morrison, who tells him that the code 'Binary 75 / 76' refers to components of the ZV nerve agent, and that one canister of each binary component was stolen earlier that morning in Utah. Graves deduces that Wright intends to assassinate the President.

Dr. Nordmann, a biologist at the University of California, San Diego (UCSD) and an expert on chemical weapons, is brought into the case by Phelps. Federal Marshals arrest Wright under Phelps' order, but when Phelps and Graves arrive to interrogate him they discover that Wright was never in the limo, that another man was found wearing his clothing. They return to their observation post across the street from Wright's apartment and see him complete the assembly of devices around two compressed gas tanks.

Wright allows himself to be captured, and tells Graves that the devices in the apartment are designed to anticipate Graves' actions, that he made Graves into a cog in his machine. Wright admits that he has placed plastic explosives in the room. Wright then escapes from the interrogation. However, prior to the interrogation, Graves had ordered roadblocks surrounding the apartment on the spur of the moment. Wright is killed trying to break through the unexpected blockade. Lewis, Graves' assistant, verifies the existence of the plastic explosives with a 'sniffer' device that senses their chemical signatures through the door seams.

Observing the apartment through binoculars the two canisters of the ZV nerve agent are seen, with connected plumbing attachments to mix and disperse the two components. Also observed are control boxes and purported motion sensors. Seeing that one box is attached to an electrical outlet, Graves has the police cut off the electricity to the apartment. This triggers a small momentary gas release that results in the death of two officers stationed outside the apartment. The apartment is engulfed in ZV gas and rendered inaccessible.

Nordmann tells Graves that other chemicals can stave off the effects of ZV, possibly long enough for Graves to enter the apartment, disconnect the tanks' valves from the control boxes, and leave again. Graves injects the chemicals and enters the apartment. Once inside, he finds that the motion sensors are a sham, and the only danger is from the ZV gas itself which he vents through a window – being on the 19th floor the weak gas dissipates harmlessly into the unoccupied street below. After he disconnects the solenoids from the tanks' valves, the timer activates and the solenoids click open – but, being disconnected, no gas is discharged, and Graves leaves the apartment thinking that victory has been too easily achieved. To support this thought he discusses his psychological profile with Nordmann and Phelps, stressing that his key psyche flaw is that he considers tasks complete when in reality they are often only partially finished.

Phelps is dismissive, but Nordmann comes to support Graves' hypothesis, and he is partially vindicated when a device disables the elevators, trapping everybody on the 19th floor – but the device was timed to go off after the gas discharge was scheduled to start. Graves takes this to mean that Wright knew he might disarm the tanks and had a backup plan. He recalls the flammable nature of the tanks, and the missing plastic explosive, reasoning that Wright had intended the tanks to explode after being emptied had Graves not gained access to the apartment, thus releasing the gas from the building and destroying any lingering evidence. If Graves had gained access and stopped the discharge, the still-full tanks would explode, releasing enough of the two agents to still combine to kill thousands. At Graves request Nordmann calculates that it would take sixteen minutes for the tanks to discharge, and Graves tells everyone that the plastic explosives will detonate sixteen minutes after the solenoids clicked open. Their search for the explosives finds nothing.

The tanks are moved into the hallway to get them away from the explosives, and the police begin to move one tank down the stairs at Nordmann's insistence. Lewis arrives with the sniffer but cannot find any trace of the explosives in the apartment. Graves sees painted letters on his shirt and realizes the explosives are wrapped around the tanks in thin strips, which physical examination and the sniffer confirm. With no time left to separate the tanks. Graves pulls the remaining tank into the apartment and with everyone's help pushes it out the open window. It explodes as it falls to the street. The other tank explodes in the stairwell of the apartment block. The two released chemicals are harmless by themselves.

In an aftermath, Graves observes that in order to prevent public panic the incident is hushed up, being only referred to as a chemical theft "halted by intervention of the Defense Department, with some minor assistance by State Department personnel, particularly Mr. R. Phelps" and that although official departmental changes are recommended to prevent any further thefts, nothing is actually mandated and no policy changes are made.

== Reception ==
The Guardian said it had a "dotty, old-hat plot made unexpectedly credible with new gadgetry and well-engineered surprises". The New York Times wrote "the author maintains tension ably".

== Film adaptation ==
Pursuit was a 1972 made-for-TV movie that screened on the ABC network based on the novel. It was a TV Movie of the Week and marked Crichton's directorial debut.

== See also ==
- VX (nerve agent)
