= Glen Orbik =

American illustrator (1963–2015)

- Born: 1963
- Died: May 11, 2015
- Education: California Art Institute
- Style: Noir
- Website: orbikart.com

Glen Orbik (1963 – May 11, 2015) was an American illustrator known for his fully painted paperback and comic covers, often executed in a noir style.

== Early life and education ==
In the 1970s, Orbik and his mother moved to Douglas County, Nevada. He is a 1981 graduate of Douglas High School in Minden, Nevada. He studied art at the California Art Institute then located in Encino, later Calabasas, California, and now located in Westlake Village. He studied under the school's founder, retired movie and advertisement illustrator Fred Fixler.

== Career ==
Orbik eventually took over the classes when Fixler retired from teaching and taught figure drawing after returning from an extended hiatus. His work has been compared to Alex Ross and Robert McGinnis, and he was a popular teacher among fine art, comic, and video game artists. He most recently worked on a series of paperback covers for the Hard Case Crime series of novels.

== Personal life ==
Orbik resided in Van Nuys, California. He died on May 11, 2015.

== Works ==
=== Covers ===
- The Swimmer DVD/Blu-ray (digital restoration) release
- Stephen King novella Blockade Billy
- Barbara Hambly novel Annie Steelyard and the Garden Of Emptiness: An Honorary Man
- Cover to Stephen King novels, The Colorado Kid and Joyland
- 25th anniversary edition of Stephen King novel It
- Joe R. Lansdale novella Hyenas: a Hap and Leonard Novella
- Joe R. Lansdale novella Dead Aim
- George Axelrod novel Blackmailer

=== Other ===
- "The Inspirations of Oz Fine Art Collection" (participant)
