= Arny Freeman =

American character actor

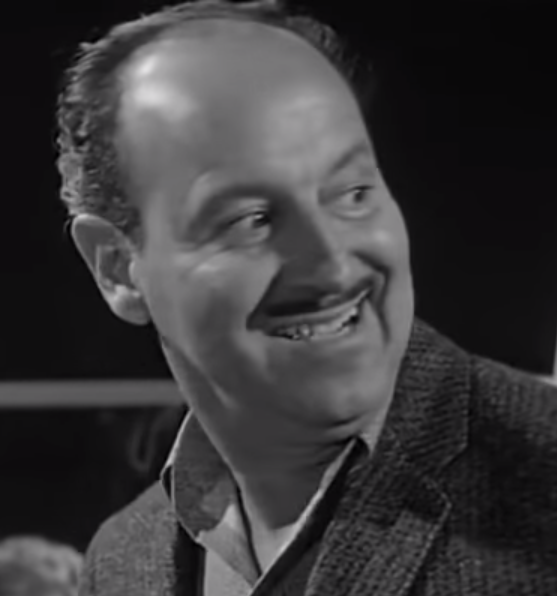
- Arny Freeman as a photographer in The Brain That Wouldn't Die (1962)
- Born: Arthur Raymond Freedman; August 28, 1908; Chicago, Illinois, U.S.
- Died: February 13, 1986 (aged 77); Los Angeles, California, U.S.
- Occupation: Actor
- Relatives: Bud Freeman (brother)

Arny Freeman (born Arthur Raymond Freedman; August 28, 1908 – February 13, 1986), sometimes credited as Arnold or Arnie Freeman, was a Chicago-born American character actor in commercials, television series episodes, Broadway plays, and motion pictures. A featured interviewee in Studs Terkel’s Working who also appeared in that book's Broadway musical adaptation, Freeman was the younger brother of jazz saxophonist Lawrence "Bud" Freeman.

== Early life and career ==
Born and raised in Chicago, Illinois, Freeman was the son of Emilie Antoinette Frenette and Louis Milton Freedman.

Among the television series in which he appeared are Naked City (1958, 1959 and 1961 [two episodes]), NBC Friday Night Special Presentation (1959's "Miracle on 34th Street"), Have Gun, Will Travel (1961), The Untouchables (1961, 1962), Kojak (1975), Maude (1976), The Jeffersons (1976), Barnaby Jones (1977), All in the Family (1977), The Incredible Hulk (1978) and Barney Miller (in 6 episodes, 1976 to 1981).

== Movie credits ==
Freeman appeared in feature films, including Phffft! (1954), The Brain That Wouldn't Die (1962), Popi (1969), The Valachi Papers (1972) and The Super Cops (1974).

== Personal life and death ==
In 1938, Freeman married Esther Stepansky.

On February 13, 1986, Freeman died in Los Angeles at the age of 77.

== Filmography ==
Year	Title	Role	Notes
1954	Phffft!	Mr Anderson	
1962	The Brain That Wouldn't Die	Photographer	
1968	What's So Bad About Feeling Good?	George Bandes	
1969	Popi	Diaz	
1972	The Valachi Papers	Ward Edison Jr	
1974	The Super Cops	Judge Benny Kellner	
