= Hard Case Crime =

American imprint of hardboiled crime novels

- Founded: 2004
- Founder: Charles Ardai
- Country of origin: United States
- Key people: Max Phillips
- Publication types: Books, Graphic novels, Comics
- Fiction genres: Hard-boiled fiction
- Owners: Winterfall LLC, in collaboration with Dorchester Publishing (2004–2010); in collaboration with Titan Books (2011–present)

Hard Case Crime is an American imprint of hardboiled crime novels founded in 2004 by Charles Ardai and Max Phillips. The series recreates, in editorial form and content, the flavor of the paperback crime novels of the 1940s and '50s. The covers feature original illustrations done in a style that was common for paperbacks of that era, credited to artists such as Robert McGinnis and Glen Orbik.

== Publication history ==
Hard Case's list includes both reprints of books from the pulp era (typically labeled Complete and unabridged on the cover), and new novels written for the collection (typically labeled First publication anywhere). The top-selling entries in the series to date have been novels by Stephen King: The Colorado Kid (2005), which later became the basis for the SyFy television series Haven, Joyland (2013), and Later (2021).

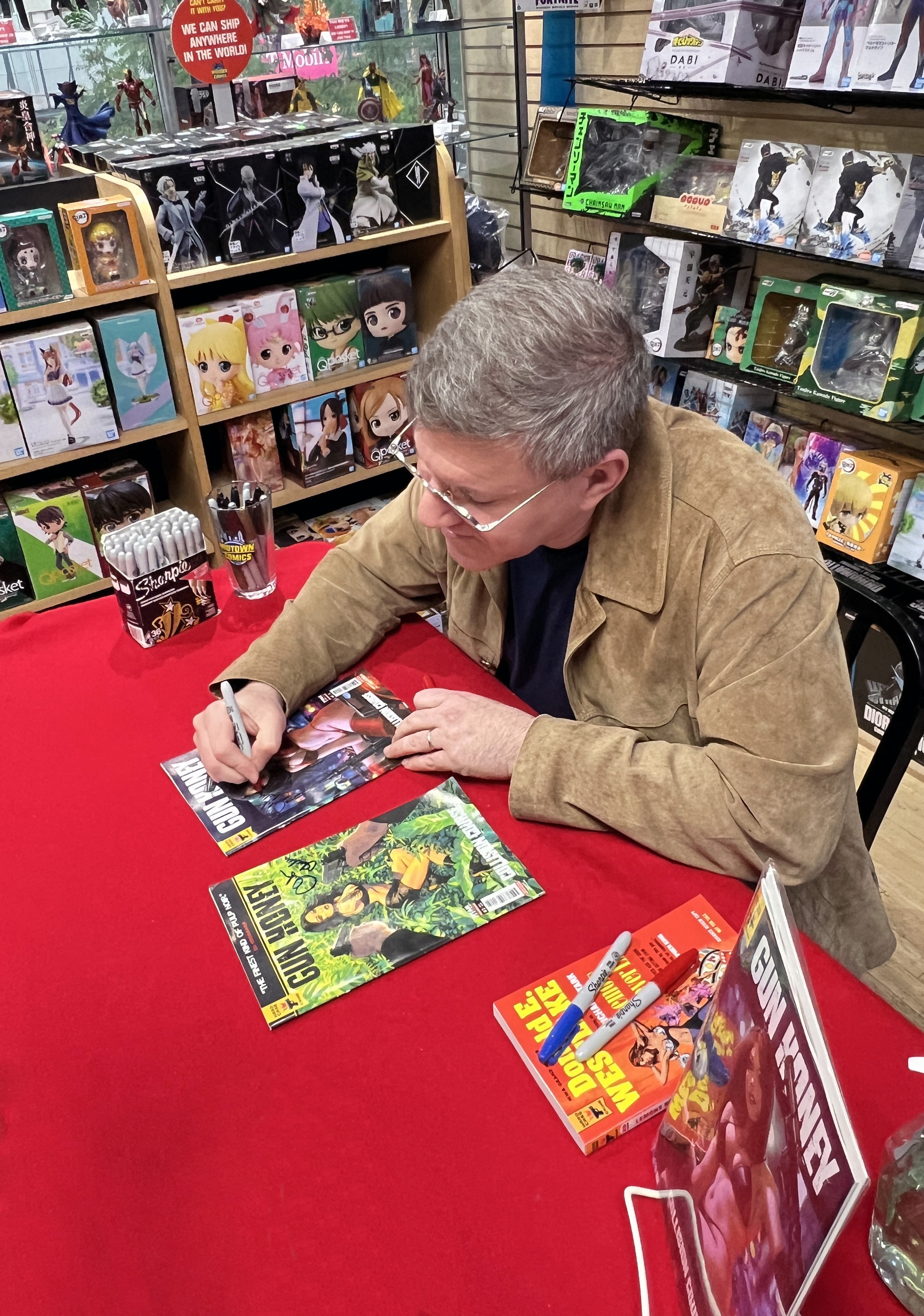
Hard Case Crime co-founder Charles Ardai at 2024 book signing for Gun Honey: Collision Course at Midtown Comics in Manhattan. The orange book beside him is an advance copy of a reprint edition of the Hard Case Crime novel Lemons Never Lie, which had previously gone out of print.

Nine novels published by Hard Case have been nominated for the Edgar Award: In 2005, Little Girl Lost, by Richard Aleas (a pseudonym for Hard Case Crime co-founder Charles Ardai that is both an anagram of Ardai's name and a play on "alias"), was nominated as Best First Novel by an American Author, and Domenic Stansberry's The Confession won the award for Best Paperback Original; in 2006, 2008, 2009, 2014, 2023, and 2024 respectively, Allan Guthrie's Kiss Her Goodbye, Russell Hill's Robbie's Wife, Christa Faust's Money Shot, Stephen King's Joyland, Max Allan Collins's Quarry's Blood, and Scott Von Doviak's Lowdown Road were nominated for Best Paperback Original. In 2022, James Kestrel's Five Decembers won the award for Best Novel.

Max Phillips' Fade to Blonde won the 2005 Shamus Award for Best Paperback Novel of the Year, and Charles Ardai's pseudonymous "Richard Aleas" novel Songs of Innocence won the same award in 2008. Ardai also received the Edgar Award in 2007, for his short story "The Home Front."

Between 2004 and 2010, Hard Case Crime was published through a collaboration between Ardai's company, Winterfall LLC, and Dorchester Publishing. After an announcement in August 2010 that Subterranean Press would be publishing "an exclusive Hard Case Crime volume," starting in 2011, Titan Books replaced Dorchester as publisher of the series. Two volumes in the series, one reprinting a pair of early Lawrence Block novels, 69 Barrow Street and Strange Embrace, the other a collection of Lawrence Block short stories, Catch and Release, ultimately were published by Subterranean Press.

Since the imprint's move to Titan Comics, Hard Case Crime has released comics and graphic novels in the same hard-boiled genre as the book division, such as Charles Ardai's Gun Honey series.

== Titles ==
| No. | Title | Author | Cover artist | Release date | Earliest copyright | ISBN | Notes |
|---|---|---|---|---|---|---|---|
| 001 | Grifter's Game | Lawrence Block | Chuck Pyle | September 2004 | 1961 | 0-8439-5349-7 | Complete and unabridged |
| 002 | Fade to Blonde | Max Phillips | Gregory Manchess | September 2004 | 2004 | 0-8439-5350-0 | First publication anywhere |
| 003 | Top of the Heap | Erle Stanley Gardner | Bill Nelson | October 2004 | 1952 | 0-8439-5352-7 | First publication in 30 years |
| 004 | Little Girl Lost | Richard Aleas | Robert McGinnis | October 2004 | 2004 | 0-8439-5351-9 | First time in paperback |
| 005 | Two for the Money | Max Allan Collins | Mark Texeira | November 2004 | 1973 | 0-8439-5353-5 | Complete and unabridged |
| 006 | The Confession | Domenic Stansberry | Richard B. Farrell | November 2004 | 2004 | 0-8439-5354-3 | First publication anywhere |
| 007 | Home Is the Sailor | Day Keene | Richard B. Farrell and Gregory Manchess | March 2005 | 1952 | 0-8439-5356-X | First publication in over 30 years |
| 008 | Kiss Her Goodbye | Allan Guthrie | Chuck Pyle | March 2005 | 2005 | 0-8439-5355-1 | First publication anywhere |
| 009 | 361 | Donald E. Westlake | Richard B. Farrell | May 2005 | 1962 | 0-8439-5357-8 | Complete and unabridged |
| 010 | Plunder of the Sun | David Dodge | Robert McGinnis | May 2005 | 1949 | 0-8439-5358-6 | Complete and unabridged |
| 011 | Branded Woman | Wade Miller | Glen Orbik | July 2005 | 1952 | 0-8439-5359-4 | Complete and unabridged |
| 012 | Dutch Uncle | Peter Pavia | Richard B. Farrell | July 2005 | 2005 | 0-8439-5360-8 | First publication anywhere |
| 013 | The Colorado Kid | Stephen King | Glen Orbik | October 2005 | 2005 | 0-8439-5584-8 | First publication anywhere |
| 014 | The Girl with the Long Green Heart | Lawrence Block | Robert McGinnis | November 2005 | 1965 | 0-8439-5585-6 | Complete and unabridged |
| 015 | The Gutter and the Grave | Ed McBain | Richard B. Farrell | December 2005 | 1958 | 0-8439-5587-2 | Complete and unabridged |
| 016 | Night Walker | Donald Hamilton | Tim Gabor | January 2006 | 1954 | 0-8439-5586-4 | Complete and unabridged |
| 017 | A Touch of Death | Charles Williams | Chuck Pyle | February 2006 | 1953 | 0-8439-5588-0 | Complete and unabridged |
| 018 | Say It with Bullets | Richard Powell | Michael Koelsch | March 2006 | 1953 | 0-8439-5589-9 | First publication in 50 years |
| 019 | Witness to Myself | Seymour Shubin | Larry Schwinger | April 2006 | 2006 | 0-8439-5590-2 | First publication anywhere |
| 020 | Bust | Ken Bruen and Jason Starr | Richard B. Farrell | May 2006 | 2006 | 0-8439-5591-0 | First publication anywhere |
| 021 | Straight Cut | Madison Smartt Bell | Chuck Pyle | June 2006 | 1986 | 0-8439-5592-9 | Complete and unabridged |
| 022 | Lemons Never Lie | Richard Stark | Richard B. Farrell | July 2006 | 1971 | 0-8439-5593-7 | Complete and unabridged |
| 023 | The Last Quarry | Max Allan Collins | Robert McGinnis | August 2006 | 2006 (drawn in part from short story published in 1989) | 0-8439-5594-5 | First publication anywhere |
| 024 | The Guns of Heaven | Pete Hamill | Larry Schwinger | September 2006 | 1983 | 0-8439-5595-3 | Complete and unabridged |
| 025 | The Last Match | David Dodge | William George | October 2006 | 2003 (written in 1973 but not published until 2006) | 0-8439-5596-1 | Never before published |
| 026 | Grave Descend | John Lange | Gregory Manchess | November 2006 (reissued as by "Michael Crichton writing as John Lange" in October 2013) | 1970 | 0-8439-5597-X | Complete and unabridged |
| 027 | The Peddler | Richard S. Prather | Robert McGinnis | December 2006 | 1952 | 0-8439-5598-8 | Complete and unabridged |
| 028 | Lucky At Cards | Lawrence Block | Chuck Pyle | February 2007 | 1964 | 0-8439-5768-9 | First publication in almost 40 years |
| 029 | Robbie's Wife | Russell Hill | Richard B. Farrell | March 2007 | 2007 | 0-8439-5769-7 | First publication anywhere |
| 030 | The Vengeful Virgin | Gil Brewer | Gregory Manchess | April 2007 | 1958 | 0-8439-5770-0 | Complete and unabridged |
| 031 | The Wounded and the Slain | David Goodis | Glen Orbik | May 2007 | 1955 | 0-8439-5771-9 | Complete and unabridged |
| 032 | Blackmailer | George Axelrod | Glen Orbik | June 2007 | 1952 | 0-8439-5772-7 | Complete and unabridged |
| 033 | Songs of Innocence | Richard Aleas | Glen Orbik | July 2007 | 2007 | 0-8439-5773-5 | First Publication Anywhere |
| 034 | Fright | Cornell Woolrich | Arthur Suydam | August 2007 | 1950 | 0-8439-5774-3 | First publication in over 50 years |
| 035 | Kill Now, Pay Later | Robert Terrall | Robert McGinnis | September 2007 | 1960 | 0-8439-5775-1 | Complete and unabridged |
| 036 | Slide | Ken Bruen and Jason Starr | Richard B. Farrell | October 2007 | 2007 | 0-8439-5776-X | First publication anywhere |
| 037 | Dead Street | Mickey Spillane | Arthur Suydam | November 2007 | 2007 | 0-8439-5777-8 | Never before published |
| 038 | Deadly Beloved | Max Allan Collins | Terry Beatty | December 2007 | 2007 | 0-8439-5778-6 | First publication anywhere |
| 039 | A Diet of Treacle | Lawrence Block | Chuck Pyle | January 2008 | 1961 | 0-8439-5957-6 | Complete and unabridged |
| 040 | Money Shot | Christa Faust | Glen Orbik | February 2008 | 2008 | 0-8439-5958-4 | First publication anywhere |
| 041 | Zero Cool | John Lange | Gregory Manchess | March 2008 (reissued as by "Michael Crichton writing as John Lange" in November 2013) | 1969 | 0-8439-5959-2 | Complete and unabridged |
| 042 | Shooting Star/Spiderweb | Robert Bloch | Arthur Suydam/Larry Schwinger | April 2008 | 1958/1954 | 0-8439-5960-6 | Two complete novels |
| 043 | The Murderer Vine | Shepard Rifkin | Ken Laager | May 2008 | 1970 | 0-8439-5961-4 | Complete and unabridged |
| 044 | Somebody Owes Me Money | Donald E. Westlake | Michael Koelsch | June 2008 | 1969 | 0-8439-5962-2 | First publication in over 35 years |
| 045 | No House Limit | Steve Fisher | Richard B. Farrell | July 2008 | 1958 | 0-8439-5963-0 | Complete and unabridged |
| 046 | Baby Moll | John Farris | Robert McGinnis | August 2008 | 1958 | 0-8439-5964-9 | First publication in 50 years |
| 047 | The Max | Ken Bruen and Jason Starr | Glen Orbik | September 2008 | 2008 | 0-8439-5966-5 | First publication anywhere |
| 048 | The First Quarry | Max Allan Collins | Ken Laager | October 2008 | 2008 | 0-8439-5965-7 | First publication anywhere |
| 049 | Gun Work | David J. Schow | Joe DeVito | November 2008 | 2008 | 0-8439-5967-3 | First publication anywhere |
| 050 | Fifty-To-One | Charles Ardai | Glen Orbik | December 2008 | 2008 | 0-8439-5968-1 | First publication anywhere |
| 051 | Killing Castro | Lawrence Block | Sharif Tarabay | January 2009 | 1961 | 0-8439-6113-9 | First publication in almost 50 years |
| 052 | The Dead Man's Brother | Roger Zelazny | Chuck Pyle | February 2009 | 2009 (written but not published in 1971) | 0-8439-6114-7 | First publication anywhere |
| 053 | The Cutie | Donald E. Westlake | Ken Laager | March 2009 | 1960 | 0-8439-6115-5 | Complete and unabridged |
| 054 | House Dick | E. Howard Hunt | Glen Orbik | April 2009 | 1961 | 0-8439-6116-3 | Complete and unabridged |
| 055 | Casino Moon | Peter Blauner | Ricky Mujica | May 2009 | 1994 | 0-8439-6117-1 | Complete and unabridged |
| 056 | Fake I.D. | Jason Starr | Gregg Kreutz | June 2009 | 2000 | 0-8439-6118-X | First U.S. publication ever |
| 057 | Passport To Peril | Robert Parker | Gregory Manchess | July 2009 | 1951 | 0-8439-6119-8 | First publication in over 50 years |
| 058 | Stop This Man! | Peter Rabe | Robert McGinnis | August 2009 | 1955 | 0-8439-6120-1 | First publication in 45 years |
| 059 | Losers Live Longer | Russell Atwood | Robert McGinnis | September 2009 | 2009 | 0-8439-6121-X | First publication ever |
| 060 | Honey In His Mouth | Lester Dent | Ron Lesser | October 2009 | 2009 (written but not published in 1956) | 0-8439-6122-8 | First publication ever |
| 061 | Quarry In The Middle | Max Allan Collins | Ron Lesser | November 2009 | 2009 | 0-8439-6124-4 | First publication ever |
| 062 | The Corpse Wore Pasties | Jonny Porkpie | Ricky Mujica | December 2009 | 2009 | 0-8439-6123-6 | First publication ever |
| 063 | The Valley of Fear | Arthur Conan Doyle | Glen Orbik | December 2009 | 1915 | 0-8439-6295-X | Inspired by a true story |
| 064 | Memory | Donald E. Westlake | Glen Orbik | April 2010 | 2010 | 0-8439-6375-1 | First publication ever |
| 065 | Nobody's Angel | Jack Clark | Ron Lesser | June 2010 | 2010 (500 self-published copies of earlier version distributed in 1996) | 0-8439-6327-1 | First time in stores |
| 066 | Murder Is My Business | Brett Halliday | Robert McGinnis | August 2010 | 1945 | 0-8439-6328-X | Complete and unabridged |
| 069 | 69 Barrow Street/Strange Embrace | Lawrence Block | Robert McGinnis | May 2012 | 1961/1962 | 978-1-59606-489-8 | Two complete novels |
| 070 | Catch and Release | Lawrence Block | Ken Laager | September 2013 | | 978-1-59606-571-0 | |
| 101 | Getting Off | Lawrence Block | Gregory Manchess | September 2011 | 2011 | 978-0-85768-287-1 | First publication anywhere |
| 102 | Quarry's Ex | Max Allan Collins | Gregory Manchess | September 2011 | 2011 | 978-0-85768-286-4 | First publication anywhere |
| 103 | The Consummata | Mickey Spillane and Max Allan Collins | Robert McGinnis | October 2011 | 2011 | 978-0-85768-288-8 | First publication anywhere |
| 104 | Choke Hold | Christa Faust | Glen Orbik | October 2011 | 2011 | 978-0-85768-285-7 | First publication anywhere |
| 105 | The Comedy Is Finished | Donald E. Westlake | Gregory Manchess | February 2012 | 2012 (Written but not published in 1970s) | 978-0-85768-408-0 | First publication anywhere |
| 106 | Blood On the Mink | Robert Silverberg | Michael Koelsch | April 2012 | 1962 | 978-0-85768-768-5 | |
| 107 | False Negative | Joseph Koenig | Glen Orbik | June 2012 | 2012 | 978-0-85768-580-3 | First publication anywhere |
| 108 | The Twenty-Year Death | Ariel S. Winter | Chuck Pyle | August 2012 | 2012 | 978-0-85768-581-0 | First publication anywhere |
| 109 | The Cocktail Waitress | James M. Cain | Michael Koelsch | September 2012 | 2012 | 978-1-78116-032-9 | First publication anywhere |
| 110 | Seduction of the Innocent | Max Allen Collins | Glen Orbik | February 2013 | 2013 | 978-0-85768-748-7 | |
| 111 | Web of the City | Harlan Ellison | Glen Orbik | April 2013 | 1958 | 978-1-78116-420-4 | |
| 112 | Joyland | Stephen King | Glen Orbik/Robert McGinnis | June 2013 | 2013 | 978-1-78116-264-4 | |
| 113 | The Secret Lives of Married Women | Elissa Wald | Glen Orbik | October 2013 | 2013 | 978-1-78116-262-0 | |
| MC1 | Odds On | Michael Crichton writing as John Lange | Glen Orbik | November 2013 | 1966 | 978-1-78329-118-2 | |
| MC2 | Scratch One | Michael Crichton writing as John Lange | Glen Orbik | October 2013 | 1967 | 978-1-78329-119-9 | |
| MC3 | Easy Go | Michael Crichton writing as John Lange | Glen Orbik | October 2013 | 1968 | 978-1-78329-120-5 | |
| MC4 | Zero Cool | Michael Crichton writing as John Lange | Gregory Manchess | November 2013 (first issued as by "John Lange" in 2008) | 1969 | 0-8439-5959-2 | Complete and unabridged |
| MC5 | The Venom Business | Michael Crichton writing as John Lange | Gregory Manchess | November 2013 | 1969 | 978-1-78329-122-9 | |
| MC6 | Drug of Choice | Michael Crichton writing as John Lange | Gregory Manchess | November 2013 | 1970 | 978-1-78329-123-6 | |
| MC7 | Grave Descend | Michael Crichton writing as John Lange | Gregory Manchess | October 2013 (first issued as by "John Lange" in 2006) | 1970 | 978-1-78329-124-3 | |
| MC8 | Binary | Michael Crichton writing as John Lange | Glen Orbik | October 2013 | 1972 | 978-1-78329-125-0 | |
| 114 | The Wrong Quarry | Max Allan Collins | Tyler Jacobson | January 2014 | | 978-1-78116-266-8 | |
| 115 | Borderline | Lawrence Block | Michael Koelsch | May 2014 | | 978-1-78116-266-8 | |
| 116 | Brainquake | Samuel Fuller | Glen Orbik | September 2014 | 1962 | 978-1-78116-819-6 | |
| S01 | A Walk Among the Tombstones | Lawrence Block | None | August 2014 | 1992 | 978-1-78329-562-3 | Now a major motion picture starring Liam Neeson |
| 117 | Easy Death | Daniel Boyd | Glen Orbik | November 2014 | 2014 | 978-0-85768-579-7 | |
| 118 | Quarry's Choice | Max Allan Collins | Robert McGinnis | January 2015 | 2015 | 978-1-78329-084-0 | |
| 119 | Thieves Fall Out | Gore Vidal | Glen Orbik | April 2015 | 1953 | 978-1-78116-792-2 | |
| 120 | So Nude, So Dead | Ed McBain | Gregory Manchess | July 2015 | 1952 | 9781781166062 | |
| 121 | The Girl with the Deep Blue Eyes | Lawrence Block | Glen Orbik | September 2015 | 2015 | 978-1-78329-750-4 | First publication anywhere |
| S02 | Quarry | Max Allan Collins | Robert McGinnis | October 2015 | 1976 | 978-1-78329-883-9 | Previously published as The Broker |
| S03 | Quarry's List | Max Allan Collins | Robert McGinnis | October 2015 | 1976 | 978-1-78329-885-3 | Previously published as The Broker's Wife |
| S04 | Quarry's Deal | Max Allan Collins | Robert McGinnis | October 2015 | 1976 | 978-1-78329-887-7 | Previously published as The Dealer |
| S05 | Quarry's Cut | Max Allan Collins | Robert McGinnis | October 2015 | 1977 | 978-1-78329-889-1 | Previously published as The Slasher |
| S06 | Quarry's Vote | Max Allan Collins | Robert McGinnis | March 2016 | 1987 | 978-1-78329-891-4 | Previously published as Primary Target |
| 122 | Cut Me In | Ed McBain | Robert McGinnis | January 2016 | 1954 | | |
| 123 | Pimp | Ken Bruen and Jason Starr | Michael Koelsch | March 2016 | 2016 | 978-1-78329-569-2 | |
| S07 | The Nice Guys | Charles Ardai | None | May 2016 | 2016 | 978-1-78565-257-8 | First publication anywhere; novelization of the film of the same name |
| 124 | SoHo Sins | Richard Vine | Robert McGuire | July 2016 | 2016 | 978-1-78329-928-7 | |
| 125 | Quarry in the Black | Max Allan Collins | Laurel Blechman, Glen Orbik | October 2016 | 2016 | 978-1-78329-814-3 | |
| 126 | Sinner Man | Lawrence Block | Michael Koelsch | November 2016 | 1968 (written in 1958 but not published until 1968) | 978-1-78565-001-7 | Previously published as Savage Lover |
| 127 | The Knife Slipped | Erle Stanley Gardner | Robert McGinnis | December 2016 | 2016 (written in 1939 but not published until 2016) | 978-1-78329-927-0 | |
| 128 | Snatch | Gregory Mcdonald | Patrick Faricy | January 2017 | 1978, 1985 | 978-1-78565-182-3 | Previously published as two separate novels, Who Took Toby Rinaldi? and Safekeeping |
| 129 | Forever and a Death | Donald E. Westlake | Paul Mann | June 2017 | 2017 | 978-1-78565-423-7 | First publication anywhere |
| 130 | Quarry's Climax | Max Allan Collins | Robert McGinnis | October 2017 | 2017 | 978-1-78565-180-9 | First publication anywhere |
| 131 | Turn on the Heat | Erle Stanley Gardner | Laurel Blechman, Robert Maguire | November 2017 | 1940 | 978-1-78565-423-7 | |
| 132 | Help I Am Being Held Prisoner | Donald E. Westlake | Paul Mann | February 2018 | 1974 | 978-1-78565-682-8 | First publication in 30 years |
| 133 | The Last Stand | Mickey Spillane | Laurel Blechman | March 2018 | 2018 | 978-1-78565-686-6 | First publication anywhere. Also includes previously unpublished novella A Bullet For Satisfaction |
| 134 | Understudy For Death | Charles Willeford | Paul Mann | July 2018 | 1961 | 978-1-78565-698-9 | First publication in 60 years |
| 135 | Charlesgate Confidential | Scott Von Doviak | Paul Mann | September 2018 | 2018 | 978-1-78565-717-7 | First publication anywhere |
| 136 | The Count of 9 | Erle Stanley Gardner | Robert McGinnis | October 2018 | 1958 | 978-1-78565-634-7 | First publication in 50 years |
| 137 | So Many Doors | Oakley Hall | Robert McGinnis, Robert Maguire | November 2018 | 1951 | 978-1-78565-688-0 | |
| 138 | Brothers Keepers | Donald E. Westlake | Paul Mann | February 2019 | 1975 | 978-1-78565-715-3 | |
| 139 | A Bloody Business | Dylan Struzan | Drew Struzan | April 2019 | 2019 | 978-1-78565-770-2 | First publication anywhere |
| 140 | Triumph of the Spider Monkey | Joyce Carol Oates | Robert McGinnis | July 2019 | 1979 | 978-1-78565-677-4 | First publication in 40 years, and first publication ever with the lost Joyce Carol Oates companion novella Love, Careless Love, unseen anywhere outside of a literary journal in 1974 |
| 141 | Blood Sugar | Daniel Kraus | Robert McGinnis | October 2019 | 2019 | 978-1-78909-193-9 | First publication anywhere |
| 142 | Killing Quarry | Max Allan Collins | Paul Mann | November 2019 | 2019 | 978-1-78565-945-4 | First publication anywhere |
| 143 | Double Feature | Donald E. Westlake | Paul Mann | February 2020 | 1977 | 978-1-78565-720-7 | First publication in 40 years |
| 144 | Are Snakes Necessary? | Brian De Palma & Susan Lehman | Paul Mann | March 2020 | 2020 | 978-1-78909-120-5 | The new novel from Brian De Palma |
| S08 | Killer, Come Back to Me | Ray Bradbury | Paul Mann | August 2020 | 2020 | 978-1-78909-539-5 | |
| 145 | Shills Can't Cash Chips | Erle Stanley Gardner | Laurel Blechman | November 2020 | 1961 | 978-1-78565-636-1 | First publication anywhere |
| 146 | Skim Deep | Max Allan Collins | Mark Eastbrook | December 2020 | 2020 | 978-1-78909-139-7 | |
| 147 | Later | Stephen King | Paul Mann, Gregory Manchess | March 2021 | 2021 | 978-1-78909-649-1 | |
| 148 | Castle in the Air | Donald E. Westlake | Paul Mann | March 2021 | 1980 | 978-1-78565-722-1 | |
| 149 | Double Down | Max Allan Collins | Mark Eastbrook | June 2021 | 1981 | 978-1-78909-141-0 | |
| 150 | Five Decembers | James Kestrel | Claudia Caranfa | October 2021 | 2021 | 978-1-78909-611-8 | First publication anywhere |
| 151 | Quarry's Blood | Max Allan Collins | Ron Lesser | February 2022 | 2022 | 978-1-78909-668-2 | First publication anywhere |
| 152 | Call Me A Cab | Donald E. Westlake | Paul Mann | February 2022 | 2022 | 978-1-78909-818-1 | First publication anywhere |
| 153 | Tough Tender | Max Allan Collins | Mark Eastbrook | March 2022 | | 978-1-78909-143-4 | |
| 154 | The Next Time I Die | Jason Starr | Claudia Caranfa | June 2022 | 2022 | 978-1-78909-951-5 | First publication anywhere |
| 155 | The Hot Beat | Robert Silverberg | Claudia Caranfa | September 2022 | 1960 | 978-1-78909-992-8 | First publication in 60 years |
| 156 | The Big Bundle | Max Allan Collins | Paul Mann | November 2022 | 2022 | 978-1-78909-852-5 | First publication anywhere |
| 157 | Fools Die on Friday | Erle Stanley Gardner | Ricky Mujica | February 2023 | | 978-1-80336-012-6 | First publication in 50 years |
| 158 | Mad Money | Max Allan Collins | Mark Eastbrook | April 2023 | | 978-1-78909-146-5 | First publication ever in one volume. Two full-length novels. The final book in Hard Case Crime's collection of Max Allan Collins' classic Nolan heist novels. |
| 159 | Lowdown Road | Scott Von Doviak | Tony Stella | July 2023 | | 978-1-80336-142-0 | First publication anywhere. |
| 160 | Too Many Bullets | Max Allan Collins | Paul Mann | October 2023 | | 978-1-78909-946-1 | First publication anywhere. |
| 161 | Seed on the Wind | Rex Stout | Robert McGinnis | November 2023 | | 978-1-80336-484-1 | First publication in over 90 years! |
| S09 | Fast Charlie | Victor Gischler | | December 2023 | | 978-1-80336-448-3 | Now a major motion picture. |
| 065-R | Nobody's Angel | Jack Clark | Claudia Caranfa | February 2024 | 2010 (500 self-published copies of earlier version distributed in 1996) | 978-1-80336-747-7 | "My favorite novel this year." Quentin Tarantino |
| 162 | Death Comes Too Late | Charles Ardai | Paul Mann | March 2024 | | 978-1-80336-626-5 | First publication anywhere. |
| 163 | Into the Night | Cornell Woolrich (completed by Lawrence Block) | Gregory Manchess | May 2024 | | 978-1-80336-699-9 | First publication in 35 years. |
| 164 | How Like a God | Rex Stout | Ricky Mujica, Robert Maguire | June 2024 | | 978-1-80336-486-5 | First publication in over 50 years! |
| 022-R | Lemons Never Lie | Richard Stark | Paul Mann | October 2024 | 1971 | 0-8439-5593-7 | |
| 165 | Quarry's Return | Max Allan Collins | Claudia Caranfa | November 2024 | | 978-1-80336-876-4 | First publication anywhere |
| 064-S | The Actor | Donald E. Westlake | | January 2025 | 2010 (reprint of Memory) | 978-1-80336-774-3 | "Unsparing...a fitting final dispatch from a master." Time |
| 166 | The Get Off | Christa Faust | Paul Mann | March 2025 | | 978-1-83541-173-5 | First publication anywhere |
| S10 | Supermax | Ken Bruen and Jason Starr | Glen Orbik | November 2025 | | 978-1-83541-225-1 | "I want to kill these guys...except I can't stop laughing long enough." Lee Child |
| 167 | Return of the Maltese Falcon | Max Allan Collins | Irvin Rodriguez | January 2026 | | 978-1-83541-487-3 | |
| 168 | Double Trouble | Joyce Carol Oates writing as Rosamond Smith | Claudia Caranfa | February 2026 | | 978-1-83541-544-3 | Two Complete Novels and Two Never-Before-Collected Stories |
| 169 | Second Nature | Joyce Carol Oates writing as Rosamond Smith | Claudia Caranfa | September 2026 | | 978-1-83541-546-7 | Two Complete Novels and Two Never-Before-Collected Stories |
| 170 | Quarry's Reunion | Max Allan Collins | Paul Mann | November 2026 | | 978-1-83541-646-4 | First publication anywhere |

== Book numbering ==
The first 66 titles, published in collaboration with Dorchester Publishing in the mass-market paperback format, were numbered HCC-001 through HCC-066. When Dorchester Publishing went out of business, Hard Case Crime had a year-long hiatus in publishing, and restarted numbering with HCC-101 when they began collaborating with Titan Books to publish further titles, mostly in the larger trade paperback format. Two books published in collaboration with Subterranean Press (a collaboration arranged before the relationship with Titan Books began, though the books were published after) were given the in-between numbering HCC-069 and HCC-070. (The books that had been scheduled to be HCC-067 and HCC-068 with Dorchester became HCC-102 and HCC-104 with Titan.)

In addition to this standard numbering system, certain titles have non-standard numbering:

- Eight titles by Michael Crichton writing as “John Lange,” published to commemorate the fifth anniversary of the author’s death, were numbered MC1-MC8. (Previously, Hard Case Crime had published two of the eight books without Crichton’s name on them, crediting them only to “John Lange,” as HCC-027 and HCC-041.)
- Ten titles (to date) have been designated S01-S10, with the “S” standing for “Special”; most of these have been movie or TV tie-in editions added to the list on relatively short notice, after other titles had already been assigned numbers that would have needed to be changed if the added titles had been inserted into the standard sequence.
- Certain titles have, when reissued in the trade paperback format by Titan Books after originally being published by Dorchester in mass-market format, had the designation “-R” appended to their number for the reissued edition.
- One title (to date) has, when reissued in the trade paperback format and also as a movie tie-in edition, had the designation “-S” appended to its number for the new edition.

== Graphic novels ==
| Title | Writer | Artist | Release date | ISBN |
|---|---|---|---|---|
| The Assignment | Matz & Walter Hill | Jef | 14 Mar 2017 | 9781785861451 |
| Triggerman | Matz & Walter Hill | Jef | 6 Jun 2017 | 9781785858673 |
| Peepland | Christa Faust & Gary Phillips | Andrea Camerini | 11 Jul 2017 | 9781785851193 |
| The Girl with the Dragon Tattoo - Millennium Vol. 1 | Stieg Larsson & Sylvain Runberg | José Homs | 14 Nov 2017 | 9781785861734 |
| The Girl Who Played With Fire - Millennium Vol. 2 | Sylvain Runberg | Man | 9 Jan 2018 | 9781785861741 |
| Normandy Gold | Alison Gaylin & Megan Abbott | Steve Scott | 11 Apr 2018 | 9781785858642 |
| The Girl Who Kicked the Hornet's Nest - Millennium Vol. 3 | Sylvain Runberg | Jose Homs | 17 Apr 2018 | 9781785863455 |
| Quarry's War | Max Allan Collins | Edu Menna, Szymon Kudranski | 3 Jul 2018 | 9781785851186 |
| Minky Woodcock: The Girl Who Handcuffed Houdini Vol. 1 | Cynthia von Buhler | Cynthia von Buhler | 22 Aug 2018 | 9781785863974 |
| Tyler Cross: Black Rock Vol. 1 | Fabien Nury | Brüno | 26 Sep 2018 | 9781785867309 |
| Babylon Berlin | Volker Kutscher | Arne Jysch | 17 Oct 2018 | 9781785866357 |
| The Prague Coup | Jean-Luc Fromental | Hyman Miles | 12 Dec 2018 | 9781785868870 |
| Mickey Spillane's Mike Hammer: The Night I Died | Max Allan Collins | Marcelo Salaza | 19 Dec 2018 | 9781785866449 |
| The Girl Who Danced With Death - Millennium Vol. 4 | Sylvain Runberg | Belén Ortega | 30 Jan 2019 | 9781785866937 |
| Tyler Cross: Angola Vol. 2 | Fabien Nury | Brüno | 13 Mar 2019 | 9781785867316 |
| Breakneck | Duane Swierczynski | Simone Guglielmini | 29 May 2019 | 9781785864612 |
| Ryuko Vol. 1 | Eldo Yoshimizu | Eldo Yoshimizu | 6 Aug 2019 | 9781787730946 |
| Ms. Tree: One Mean Mother Vol. 1 | Max Allan Collins | Terry Beatty | 4 Sep 2019 | 9781787730519 |
| Ryuko Vol. 2 | Eldo Yoshimizu | Eldo Yoshimizu | 16 Oct 2019 | 9781787732551 |
| The Big Hoax | Carlos Trillo | Domingo Roberto Mandrafina | 29 Jul 2020 | 9781787730502 |
| Ms. Tree: Skeleton in the Closet Vol. 2 | Max Allan Collins | Terry Beatty | 21 Oct 2020 | 9781787730526 |
| Ms. Tree: The Cold Dish Vol. 3 | Max Allan Collins | Terry Beatty | 16 Nov 2021 | 9781787730533 |
| Minky Woodcock: The Girl Who Electrified Tesla Vol. 2 | Cynthia von Buhler | Cynthia von Buhler | 30 Nov 2021 | 9781787730113 |
| Gun Honey | Charles Ardai | Ang Hor Kheng | 29 Mar 2022 | 9781782763468 |
| Frank Lee: After Alcatraz | David Hasteda | Ludovic Chesnot | 12 Jul 2022 | 9781787738768 |
| Ms. Tree: Deadline Vol. 4 | Max Allan Collins | Terry Beatty | 5 Oct 2022 | 9781787730540 |
| Gun Honey: Blood for Blood Vol 2 | Charles Ardai | Ang Hor Kheng | 11 Apr 2023 | 9781787739048 |
| Noir Burlesque | Enrico Marini | Enrico Marini | 24 Oct 2023 | 9781787739956 |
| Ms Tree: Heroine Withdrawal Vol.5 | Max Allan Collins | Terry Beatty | 19 Dec 2023 | 9781787730557 |
| Heat Seeker: A Gun Honey Series Vol.1 | Charles Ardai | Ace Continuado | 27 Feb 2024 | 9781787740914 |
| Ms Tree: Fallen Tree Vol.6 | Max Allan Collins | Terry Beatty | 31 Dec 2024 | 9781787735590 |
| Gun Honey: Collision Course Vol.3 | Charles Ardai | Ang Hor Kheng | 14 Jan 2025 | 9781787740907 |
| The Collected Will Eisner's John Law | Will Eisner | Gary Chaloner | 4 Mar 2025 | 9781787745353 |
| Minky Woodcock: The Girl Called Cthulhu Vol.3 | Cynthia Von Buhler | Cynthia Von Buhler | 27 May 2025 | 9781787743298 |
| Heat Seeker: Combustion - A Gun Honey Series Vol.2 | Charles Ardai | Ace Continuado | 22 July 2025 | 9781787743304 |
