= Pursuit (1972 American film) =

- DVD cover
- Based on: Binary by John Lange
- Written by: Robert Dozier
- Directed by: Michael Crichton
- Starring: Ben Gazzara; Martin Sheen; E.G. Marshall; William Windom; Joseph Wiseman
- Music by: Jerry Goldsmith
- Country of origin: United States
- Original language: English

Production
- Executive producer: Lee Rich
- Producer: Robert L. Jacks
- Running time: 74 minutes
- Production companies: 20th Century Fox Television; ABC Circle Films

Original release
- Network: ABC
- Release: December 12, 1972

Pursuit is a 1972 American made-for-television drama film that screened on the ABC network as an ABC Movie of the Week. It was Michael Crichton's first work as a director. It is based on Crichton's 1972 novel Binary, which he published under the pseudonym John Lange.

== Plot ==
A political extremist plots to destroy San Diego.

== Cast ==
- Ben Gazzara as Steven Graves
- E.G. Marshall as James Wright
- William Windom as Robert Phillips
- Joseph Wiseman as Dr. Peter Nordman
- Jim McMullan as Lewis
- Martin Sheen as Timothy Drew
- Will Kuluva as Dr. Wolff

== Production ==
=== Development ===
Crichton had long been interested in movies, well before he started his medical career.

Barry Diller wanted to buy the film rights for Crichton's novel to make it an ABC Movie of the Week. Crichton would only agree to this on the provision that he be able to direct. Diller was amenable, but insisted that a more experienced writer, Robert Dozier, do the screenplay. "It was crazy, another writer doing the screenplay of my book for me to direct," said Crichton, "but I was so anxious to direct I went along with it... He had a maiden director, he wanted a pro on the script."

Crichton later declared that film directing was not a complicated craft. "I think you could learn all you need to know in a month," he said. "Orson Welles said four hours. But he was being outrageous".

=== Shooting ===
Filming took place in April 1972 over 11 days in San Diego. The novel would not be published until August 1972. The budget was $400,000.

Crichton:

I like the television movie. I like the form and the speed of it. I think about 80% of the movies I see on the big screens are television movies... I was terrified at first by the actors, but I found the actors will help you every chance they get. The rest of the people have no interest in taking responsibility. You're the big daddy and that's the way they want it.

Crichton says his medical training came in handy being a director. "So much of medicine is doing things for the first time; you learn to plunge right in... I found out if you wanted to be in control of the situation, you had to stay on your feet. Once you sit down, your control evaporates. That's where med school came in too – you're on your feet 15 hours a day."

== Reception ==
ABC were so impressed by the quality of the movie they held it back until December to screen it. It aired opposite the Carol Burnett special Once Upon a Mattress and a repeat of NBC's adaptation of The Snow Goose.

The critic from the Los Angeles Times wrote that "you cannot say that as a director, at least in this maiden effort, Crichton achieves the bone tingling suspense of his novel but Pursuit nonetheless has its own fascination... Marshall is superb; Gazzara, as usual is excellent and heads a fine support cast... Crichton attempted here a realistic, newsreel look to the film which is at its worst when real newsreels from a real political convention are inserted."
