= The Super Cops =

1974 film by Gordon Parks

- Directed by: Gordon Parks
- Screenplay by: Lorenzo Semple Jr.
- Based on: The Super Cops by L.H. Whittemore
- Produced by: William Belasco
- Starring: Ron Leibman; David Selby; Sheila Frazier; Pat Hingle; Dan Frazer; Joseph Sirola; Arny Freeman
- Cinematography: Richard C. Kratina
- Edited by: Moe Howard
- Music by: Jerry Fielding
- Production company: Metro-Goldwyn-Mayer
- Distributed by: United Artists (United States/Canada); Cinema International Corporation (International)
- Release date: March 20, 1974
- Running time: 90 minutes
- Country: United States
- Language: English

The Super Cops is a 1974 action adventure film directed by Gordon Parks and starring Ron Leibman and David Selby. The film is based on the book The Super Cops: The True Story of the Cops Called Batman and Robin by L. H. Whittemore. The film was released a few months after the successful cop movie Serpico (also based on a true story).

== Plot ==
The film opens with archival footage from a press conference where NYPD officers Dave Greenberg and Robert Hantz are being commended by Commissioner Patrick V. Murphy for the sheer volume of drugs and weaponry that the two cops have removed from the streets.

After a credits sequence, the narrative begins at the New York City Police Academy, where Greenberg and Hantz graduate as probationary officers. They are assigned to low-level work like clerical tasks and directing traffic, but they chafe against the insignificance of these tasks and frequently abandon them to follow the sound of gunfire. One day, Greenberg is standing on the street in plain clothes when an elderly man offers to sell him some "French films" (porn). When he refuses, the old man attacks Greenberg, who arrests him. Greenberg gets in trouble for making an arrest while off-duty.

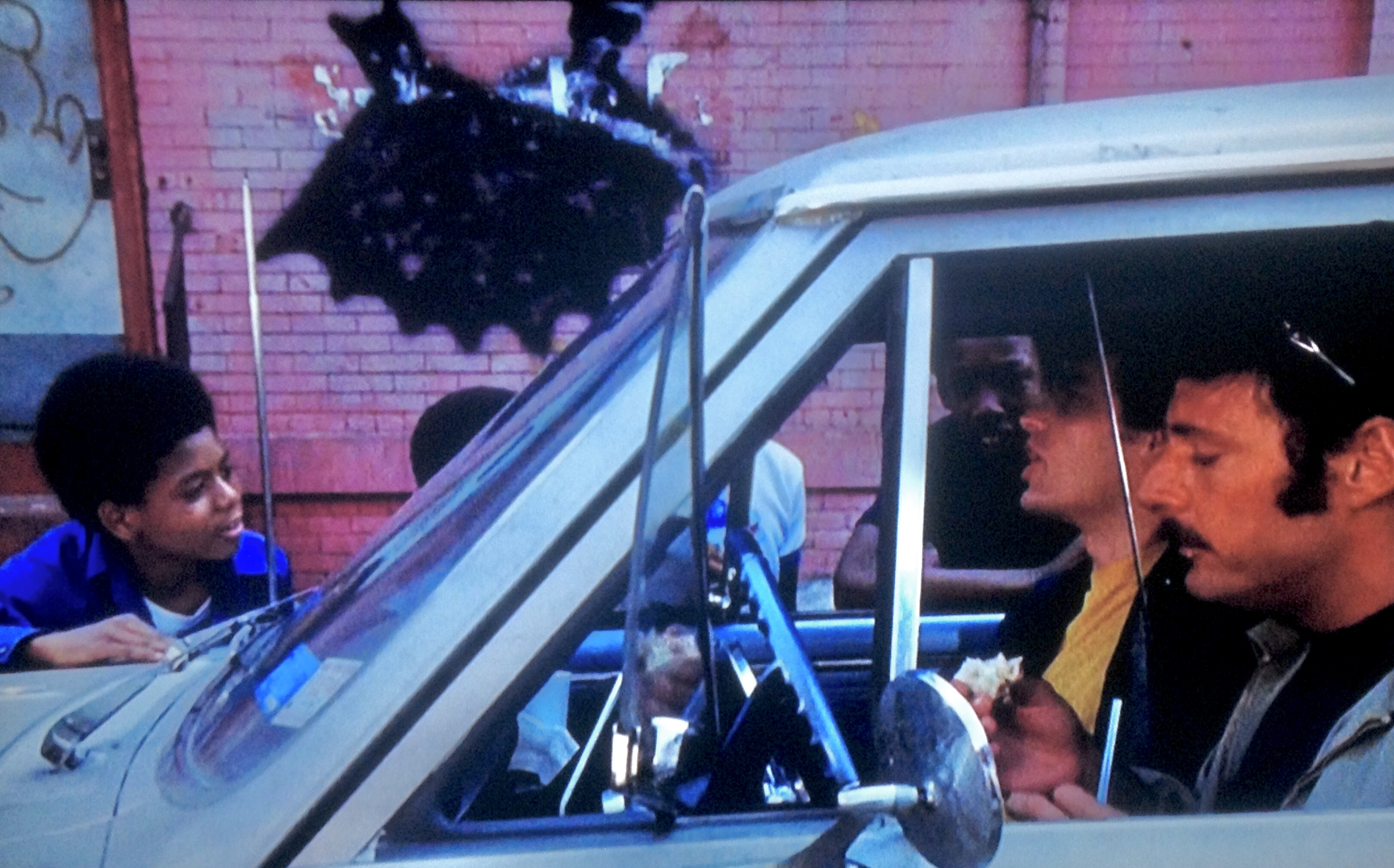
A still image from The Super Cops showing Greenberg and Hantz in front of a Batman & Robin tag

Greenberg and Hantz decide to keep making off-duty collars. They go to Coney Island disguised as Texaco attendants. They make a drug bust under the boardwalk and bring their collars to the local precinct, where the supervising officer is astonished to learn that two off-duty probationary cops confiscated so many illegal weapons and drugs. The pair continue to make busts around the city in their spare time. They stop a stolen car on Convent Avenue in Harlem, and at the local precinct, they bluff their way into being treated as senior officers from the "SUB" division, which is just the acronym for traffic enforcement.

After their probationary period, they are assigned to the fictional 21st Precinct in the Bedford-Stuyvesant neighborhood of Brooklyn. On their way to report for duty, they are aghast at the state of the neighborhood, and the precinct seems to be in just as much disarray. They are told to not make waves and to report for their first full day of duty the following morning. Instead, they find some prostitutes, hoping to get information. Greenberg tells his prostitute, Sara, that he is a cop and asks where he can find some drug dealers. She screams for her pimp, causing a commotion.

Undaunted, Greenberg and Hantz manage to find an informant and make their first drug bust. As they book their collars, they identify themselves as new to the precinct. They are asked when they started, and Greenberg replies, "Tomorrow". They track down the precinct Captain Krasna. He is convinced his office is bugged, and he views Greenberg and Hantz's enthusiasm warily.

Greenberg meets Sara again at Hank's Tip Top Inn and accompanies her back to her apartment. He presses her for information about drug activity. The duo start making busts with her information. Captain Krasna calls them into his office and accuses them of being on the take because of all their independent drug busts. He pretends to call Internal Affairs, but when they do not react like corrupt cops, he decides to encourage their freelancing. Sara tells Greenberg that a contract has been put out on them. An anonymous tip to the station confirms her warning. Greenberg and Hantz lie in wait for their assassins and make a daring bust in broad daylight. The bystanders jokingly yell out greetings to the adventurous cops who they call "Batman and Robin".

At the arraignment for the case, Greenberg and Hantz are offered $1,500 to lie and get the case dropped. They try to gather evidence about the attempted bribe, but the District Attorney's office ruins the bust by warning off the targets. The officers are growing more isolated by their fellow cops, who either resent them for showing them up, or view them with suspicion as being either corrupt or part of Internal Affairs.

The partners eventually corner the three Hayes Brothers who run the drug market in Bed-Stuy. The Hayeses offer them a $1,000-week bribe, which Greenberg and Hantz pretend to take. Greenberg insists on meeting the Hayeses' suppliers, but on the way to the meeting, one of the Hayeses notices Greenberg's wire. Greenberg and Hantz kill the brothers in self-defense, and they are taken off duty while Inspector Novick conducts an internal investigation.

Greenberg is approached by another officer who has just transferred from the 80th Precinct. He offers to cut Greenberg and Hantz in on a scam. They meet at the Fish Delight Hut to discuss the details. It turns out the officer is from the Knapp Commission, and when he tries to arrest Greenberg and Hantz, the pair, in turn, try to arrest him for engaging in conspiracy. Greenberg threatens to arrest the other Knapp officers on the scene for entrapment. When Insp. Novick and Cpt. Krasna arrive at the restaurant, both factions of officers reveal that they have been taping each other. The stalemate is resolved by promoting everyone. The film ends with a re-enactment of the opening press conference, with Novick commending Greenberg and Hantz for their service.

== Cast ==
- Ron Leibman as David Greenberg
- David Selby as Robert Hantz
- Sheila Frazier as Sara
- Pat Hingle as Insp. Novick
- Dan Frazer as Police Capt. Irving Krasna
- Joseph Sirola as Police Lt. O'Shaughnessy
- Arny Freeman as Judge Benny Kellner
- Bernard Kates as Heller
- Alex Colon as Carlos
- Charles Turner as Joe Hayes
- Ralph Wilcox as John Hayes
- Al Fann as Frank Hayes
- Albert Henderson as Police Capt. Arbow

== In other media ==
The Archie Comics superhero imprint Red Circle Comics published one issue of a Super Cops comic book (with stories written by Marv Channing) in July 1974.

A half-hour pilot for a proposed TV series based on the film, starring Steven Keats as Greenberg and Alan Feinstein as Hantz, aired in 1975 on CBS.

== Historical accuracy ==
In a New York magazine profile, Greenberg makes a number of extraordinary claims about his life, such as being the only white member of the Amboy Dukes gang, being kicked out of three colleges despite having a 160 IQ, being the "heavyweight champion of the armed services" for three years during his time in the Navy, training with Sonny Liston, and being handpicked for President Kennedy's "Honor Guard" in Hyannis Port after the President and his wife saw Greenberg fight. Greenberg and Hantz actually grew up together in Coney Island before joining the NYPD. Their exploits reportedly were the inspiration for Starsky & Hutch.

Greenberg retired from the NYPD in 1975 and was elected as an Assemblyman. In 1978, he was arrested on mail fraud and obstruction of justice, serving nine months. In 1989, Greenberg was arrested again on mail fraud as well as insurance fraud for overstating the burglary losses to a videotape distribution business he owned. He was sentenced to four years in 1990. Hantz was busted for possessing marijuana while on vacation in the Bahamas in 1975. He resigned from the NYPD after being demoted because of the arrest.

In a 2012 book, former Knapp Commission counsel Michael F. Armstrong disclosed that Greenberg and Hantz were investigated by the Brooklyn District Attorney's office for the murder of two drug dealers, an event recounted in the Super Cops book and movie as self-defense. Armstrong said that the Greenberg and Hantz account was contrary to the evidence, and he disputed other parts of the book, claiming that the two repeatedly shook down, robbed and assaulted suspects.

== Availability and influence ==
For many years The Super Cops was unavailable on home video. On January 19, 2011, film director Edgar Wright requested a DVD release of The Super Cops from the Warner Archive on Twitter, and Warner responded by announcing a remastered manufactured on-demand edition of The Super Cops. The film was released on DVD via the Warner Archive Collection on September 13, 2011.

In 2015, while serving as a Guest Programmer for Turner Classic Movies, Wright introduced the film with TCM host Robert Osborne. He explained that he first saw it as a child, and that he watched it again when he was making Hot Fuzz. He lifted the idea of an over-eager cop making busts at his new precinct before actually reporting for duty in Hot Fuzz.

Wright pointed out that the screenwriter for the film, Lorenzo Semple Jr., also wrote for the Batman TV series, which is an interesting coincidence given all the references to that show in the film. The real Greenberg wears a Batman T-shirt at the opening press conference, and Ron Leibman last appears in the film in the same shirt. During one scene, Greenberg and Hantz have lunch right next to a graffiti tag of Batman and Robin. The movie even ends with a graphic "Pow" appearing with a sound effect, in the style of the TV show.

== See also ==
- List of American films of 1974
