= William Belasco =

William Belasco (July 30, 1934 - February 26, 1976) was a film producer.

Belasco was a theatrical agent who had helped "package" the TV series Batman and The Green Hornet. His clients included Pat Boone, Frankie Avalon, Fabian and Chuck Connors.

He sold his agency Progressive Management Corp in 1968 and joined MGM as a producer for whom he made a number of films. Blake Edwards was critical of Belasco's behaviour while making The Carey Treatment. Belasco moved to MGM in 1975.

Belasco formed a partnership and friendship with Sal Mineo to make a film called McCaffrey. Mineo was murdered on February 12th in a random robbery and Belasco was going to hold a memorial for the actor at Belasco's house. However before this happened Belasco was injured in a car accident on February 22, 1976. He never recovered from his wounds and died several days later.

== Select filmography ==
- The Carey Treatment (1972)
- They Only Kill Their Masters (1972)
- The Super Cops (1974)
- The Last Hard Men (1976)
