= The Carey Treatment =

1972 film by Blake Edwards

- Theatrical release poster
- Directed by: Blake Edwards
- Screenplay by: Harriet Frank Jr. (as James P. Bonner)
- Based on: novel A Case of Need by Michael Crichton (as Jeffery Hudson)
- Produced by: William Belasco
- Starring: James Coburn; Jennifer O'Neill; Dan O'Herlihy; Pat Hingle
- Cinematography: Frank Stanley
- Edited by: Ralph E. Winters
- Music by: Roy Budd
- Production company: Geoffrey Productions
- Distributed by: Metro-Goldwyn-Mayer
- Release date: March 29, 1972
- Running time: 101 minutes
- Country: United States
- Language: English

The Carey Treatment is a 1972 American crime thriller film directed by Blake Edwards and starring James Coburn, Jennifer O'Neill, Dan O'Herlihy and Pat Hingle. The film was based on the 1968 novel A Case of Need credited to Jeffery Hudson, a pseudonym for Michael Crichton. Like Darling Lili and Wild Rovers before this, The Carey Treatment was heavily edited without help from Edwards by the studio into a running time of one hour and 41 minutes. These edits were satirized in his 1981 black comedy S.O.B.

== Plot ==
Dr. Peter Carey is the new pathologist at a Boston hospital. He befriends his colleagues and falls in love with dietitian Georgia Hightower. The hospital is run by surgeon J.D. Randall. Police are investigating a series of morphine thefts at the hospital. One night, Dr. Randall's daughter Karen dies in the emergency room after a botched abortion.

Dr. David Tao is arrested for performing the abortion. Carey pretends to be his lawyer in order to visit him in jail. Tao admits to charging $25 for illegal abortions, because he was horrified at how women suffered at the hands of amateurs. However, Tao says he did not perform Karen's abortion. Police Captain Pearson warns Carey to leave the case alone, but Carey hates the idea of his innocent friend going to prison.

The post-mortem reveals that whoever did the procedure had curettage knowledge but pierced the endometrium, causing the fatal hemorrhaging. Karen's blood work shows she was not pregnant. Carey suspects she missed a few periods and panicked into getting an abortion. He questions Karen's roommate Lydia Barrett. She confesses that she hated Karen for stealing her boyfriend Roger Hudson. Carey visits Hudson at the massage parlor where he works. He sees nurse Angela Holder leaving as he arrives.

Carey deduces that Holder was stealing the hospital's drugs for Hudson to sell. He gets Holder to confess to performing the abortion to fund her drug habit. Hudson goes berserk and tries to kill Carey multiple times before Pearson kills him.

== Cast ==
- James Coburn as Dr. Peter Carey
- Jennifer O'Neill as Georgia Hightower
- Pat Hingle as Capt. Pearson
- Skye Aubrey as Nurse Angela Holder
- Elizabeth Allen as Evelyn Randall
- John Fink as Chief Surgeon Andrew Murphy
- Dan O'Herlihy as J.D. Randall
- James Hong as Dr. David Tao
- Alex Dreier as Dr. Joshua Randall
- Melissa Torme-March as Karen Randall
- Jennifer Edwards as Lydia Barrett
- Michael Blodgett as Roger Hudson
- Regis Toomey as Dr. Sanderson
- Steve Carlson as Walding
- Rosemary Edelman as Janet Tao
- John Hillerman as Jenkins

== Production ==
=== Development ===
Film rights to Jeffrey Hudson (a pseudonym for Michael Crichton)'s novel A Case of Need were purchased in August, 1968 by A&M Productions, the production company of Herb Alpert with filming announced to begin the following year in Boston. In October Perry Leff signed Wendell Mayes to a two-picture contract to write and produce, the first of which was to be A Case of Need.

Metro-Goldwyn-Mayer then acquired the film rights. In March, 1971, it was announced that Bill Belasco was producing and Harriet Frank Jr. and Irving Ravetch were working on a script.

In June, 1971, Blake Edwards was signed to direct. This was considered surprising because Edwards had clashed with MGM head James Aubrey during the making of Wild Rovers. Edwards' wife Julie Andrews later wrote "for reasons I can only guess at, Blake took the bait. Perhaps there was some compulsion on his part to make things right, or perhaps he simply wanted to finally win out against the man who had caused him such pain." Aubrey promised Edwards he would finance The Green Man, a project of Edwards' to star Julie Andrews. The cast included Aubrey's daughter Skye.

=== Shooting ===
Filming started in September 1971 under the title A Case of Need. It was a difficult shoot with Edwards claiming Aubrey cut his schedule and refused to let Edwards rewrite the script. Edwards left the film after completing it.

Edwards launched a breach of contract suit against MGM and Aubrey for their post production tampering of the film. Edwards stated:

The whole experience was, in terms of filmmaking, extraordinarily destructive. The temper and tantrums from my producer, William Belasco, were such that he insulted me in front of the cast and crew and offered to bet me $1,000 that I'd never work in Hollywood again if I didn't do everything his and Aubrey's way. They told me that they didn't want quality, just a viewable film. The crew felt so bad about the way I was treated that they gave me a party – and usually it's the other way round. I know I've been guilty of excuses but my God what do you have to do to pay your dues? I made Wild Rovers for MGM and kept quiet when they recut it. But this time I couldn't take it. I played fair. They didn't.

James Coburn later said, "You know, I don’t mind that film. I liked my work on it. There again the studio (MGM) fucked it up. They cut ten days out of the schedule. They pulled the plug on us early. It’s too bad. We did shoot the film on location in Boston though."

== Reception ==
=== Critical response ===
The Carey Treatment received mostly mixed to negative reviews from critics.

On review aggregator Rotten Tomatoes, the film holds an approval rating of 60% based on 5 reviews, with an average score or 5.20/10.

Vincent Canby, writing for The New York Times, was amused by The Carey Treatment but wrote, "...I don't think we have to take this too seriously, for The Carey Treatment, like so many respectable private-eye movies, is sustained almost entirely by irrelevancies."

Roger Ebert wrote, "The problem is in the script. There are long, sterile patches of dialog during which nothing at all is communicated. These are no doubt important in order to convey the essential meaninglessness of life, but how can a director make them interesting? Edwards tries."

The Los Angeles Times called it "Edwards' best movie in years" and Coburn's "best role since moving up from supporting player to star."

Variety said it was "written, directed, timed, paced and cast like a feature-for-tv... a serviceable release... Jennifer O'Neill... graces with her beauty plots to which she has absolutely no integral contribution."

FilmInk argued it "took Michael Crichton’s excellent novel and turned it into a bland TV movie; Coburn’s groovy doctor feels out of place."

=== Accolades ===
Edgar Allan Poe Awards

- 1973: Nominated, Best Motion Picture Screenplay

== See also ==
- List of American films of 1972
