= Joyland (King novel) =

2013 novel by Stephen King

- First-edition cover
- Author: Stephen King
- Cover artist: Glen Orbik
- Language: English
- Genre: Mystery; Crime; Horror
- Publisher: Hard Case Crime
- Publication date: June 4, 2013
- Publication place: United States
- Media type: Print (paperback)
- Pages: 288
- ISBN: 978-1-781-16264-4
- Website: Author; Publisher

Joyland is a novel by American writer Stephen King, published in 2013 by Hard Case Crime. It is King's second book for the imprint, following The Colorado Kid (2005). The first edition was released only in paperback, with cover art created by Robert McGinnis and Glen Orbik. A limited hardcover edition followed a week later. The novel was nominated for the 2014 Edgar Award for Best Paperback Original.

== Background information ==
The novel was first mentioned in passing in Neil Gaiman's interview with Stephen King for The Sunday Times, published on April 8, 2012, and was officially announced on May 30, 2012. The novel's cover art was revealed on September 20, 2012, by Entertainment Weekly. In his interview on NPR's Fresh Air on May 28, 2013, King revealed that the novel grew from a single image he had for 20 years of a boy in a wheelchair flying a Jesus kite on a beach. King also noted that Canobie Lake Park, an amusement park in Salem, New Hampshire, was one of the main sources of inspiration for the novel.

== Limited edition ==
On May 13, 2013, Titan Books, which publishes the Hard Case Crime line of books, announced the publication of a limited hardcover edition of Joyland, to be released on June 11, 2013, one week after the initial paperback publication of the novel. The book was published as three different editions: a gift edition, limited to 1,500 copies; a numbered edition, limited to 724 copies and signed by the author; and a lettered edition, limited to 26 copies and signed by the author. Each iteration features cover art by Robert McGinnis, different from the paperback edition, as well as a map of the Joyland amusement park, created by Susan Hunt Yule.

== Plot ==
Devin Jones takes a summer job at Joyland in North Carolina. Devin is told by local fortune teller Rozzie that he will meet two children that summer: a girl with a red hat and a boy with a dog. Devin secures lodging for the summer at a rooming house owned by Mrs. Shoplaw, a woman who knows a great deal of Joyland's history and employees. Devin's girlfriend, Wendy, promises to finally sleep with him before the semester ends but ditches him at the last moment.

At the start of the summer, Devin is placed in Team Beagle, one of the dog-themed crews at Joyland, and becomes friends with other new-hires Tom and Erin. He works mainly with Lane Hardy, operating the park's Ferris wheel. Any attempts to connect with Wendy fail, and he eventually receives a letter telling him to give up because she has found someone else. He stops sleeping and barely eats, spending his free time listening to music and contemplating suicide. Devin realizes that he has a talent for portraying Howie the Happy Hound, Joyland's mascot, and enjoys making kids happy. He throws himself into work so thoroughly that his friends Lane and Rozzie have to confront him about his failing health. One day, while acting as Howie, he saves the aforementioned young girl with the doll from choking on a hot dog. The heroics earn him the trust and admiration of the park's owner and founder, Mr. Easterbrook, along with local acclaim.

Devin, Tom, and Erin learn that several years earlier, a girl named Linda Gray was murdered in the park's only dark ride, Horror House, and that her ghost still haunts it. Tom sees her ghost on the ride and refuses to speak of it, but Devin does not and becomes interested in the case.

At the end of the summer, Devin decides to take a year off from school and stay at the park while it is closed. Erin researches the murder while back at school and plans a return visit to Joyland with Tom to present her findings to Devin. She brings pictures and articles, proving that this was only the latest in a string of unsolved murders, which were never connected by the police. Devin becomes close to a standoffish woman named Annie and her son, Mike, who both live near Joyland. Despite Annie's lukewarm treatment of Devin, she comes to like him after seeing how he makes her dying son happy. Mike reveals he knows about Linda's ghost and has a dog, and Devin realizes he is the second child in Rozzie's prediction.

Devin is able to organize a private trip to Joyland for Mike, where the remaining employees pull out all the stops and make Mike's first and only visit unforgettable. Mike's presence near Horror House helps free Linda's ghost. That night, Devin loses his virginity to Annie.

Devin returns to his boarding house, which is preparing for an upcoming storm. He begins looking through the pictures again and suddenly realizes that the murderer is in fact Lane Hardy. Lane has guessed that Devin knows who he is and threatens to kill Annie and Mike unless Devin meets him at Joyland. Lane traps the two of them on the Ferris wheel in the middle of the storm and is about to kill Devin, when Annie shows up and fatally shoots Lane. Devin learns that Mike had been awakened by another ghost (of a park employee Devin had previously saved), who warned him about Lane.

Annie and Mike return to Chicago to see Annie's estranged father, and Devin goes back to school. Mike dies later that spring, having requested that his ashes be spread on the beach in North Carolina by Annie and Devin.

== Reception ==
Walter Kirn at The New York Times compared the novel to "a plump wad of cotton candy; it fills the mouth with fluffy sweetness that quickly dissolves when the reader starts to chew. That's by design." The Los Angeles Review of Books noted the novel's ephemeralness but acknowledged its deeper appeal thanks to smaller flourishes, such as characters that are well-drawn despite their familiarity, and the surprising level of attention paid to "carnie patois", in-group slang: "There is an almost delirious pleasure in reading the words, savoring them, and, after a certain point, getting used to them." Joyland's departure from King's typical genre also earned praise. The Guardian called the novel "a far gentler, deeper, more thoughtful book than the one it masquerades as. More a coming-of-age mystery than a horror-filled thriller, it's closer to the tone of King's short story The Body ... than it is to the author's real forays into horror."

== Adaptation ==
In 2018, Freeform announced that a TV series based on the novel was in development. As of an update in November 2021, there has been no progress beyond an initial treatment for a pilot script.
