= They Only Kill Their Masters =

1972 film by James Goldstone

- Directed by: James Goldstone
- Written by: Lane Slate
- Produced by: William Belasco
- Starring: James Garner; Katharine Ross; Hal Holbrook; Harry Guardino; June Allyson; Christopher Connelly; Tom Ewell; Peter Lawford; Edmond O'Brien; Arthur O'Connell; Ann Rutherford
- Cinematography: Michel Hugo
- Edited by: Edward A. Biery
- Music by: Perry Botkin Jr.
- Distributed by: Metro-Goldwyn-Mayer
- Release date: November 22, 1972
- Running time: 97 minutes
- Country: United States
- Language: English
- Box office: $1,005,000 (US/ Canada rentals)

They Only Kill Their Masters is a 1972 American mystery comedy film directed by James Goldstone, written by Lane Slate, and starring James Garner and Katharine Ross, with a supporting cast featuring Hal Holbrook, June Allyson, Tom Ewell, Peter Lawford, Edmond O'Brien, Ann Rutherford, and Arthur O'Connell. The title refers to Doberman dogs that might have been responsible for a woman's murder currently under investigation by the local police chief (Garner). Garner wrote in his memoirs that "I'd rather not talk about" the film.

== Plot ==
In the sleepy California coastal town of Eden Landing, police chief Abel Marsh returns from vacation to learn that divorcée Jenny Campbell has been killed by her pet Doberman, Murphy, on the shore of her beachfront home.

Abel visits Dr. Warren Watkins, the veterinarian who tranquilized the dog when it was found over Jenny's dead body. Abel meets Watkins' new nurse, Kate Bingham, who objects to the dog being euthanized. Sarcastically telling Abel that "they only kill their masters," she shows him how Murphy responds readily to voice commands. When she says that dogs usually attack the throat, Abel wonders why the dead woman's bites were only on her extremities, and he orders an autopsy. The pathologist discovers that Jenny died from drowning in fresh water laced with salt. He also learns that Jenny was pregnant. Abel realizes that Murphy did not cause her death, and that her injuries came from the dog pulling her dead body out of the ocean.

Abel questions Jenny's ex-husband, wealthy playboy Lee Campbell, who reveals that he divorced his sexually adventurous wife because she fell in love with another woman. Abel returns to the dead woman’s house with Kate, ostensibly because he wants her help in looking around. Kate, who has softened toward Abel, confirms that the bathtub was cleaned with industrial disinfectant and he tells her it is the likely scene of the murder. Abel takes Murphy in and they begin to bond. Kate and Abel's relationship progresses also and they spend the night together.

Head Sheriff Daniel Streeter, Abel's long-time friend, questions Abel's handling of the case but agrees that he should remain in charge. Abel goes to the dead woman’s house to conduct a previously arranged interview with Lee Campbell, only to find the home on fire and Campbell inside the bedroom, dying of stab wounds. By the time the police arrive, Campbell has died and the home has been reduced to ashes. A young patrolman explains that the emergency crews were delayed by a sports car blocking the tunnel.

Back at his home, Abel wonders why Murphy did not bark at the arsonist. Abel taps him on the snout, unaware that it is a command for the dog to assume attack mode. Abel returns the animal to Dr. Watkins.

In the morning, Abel begins to wonder how Kate knew the dog's name. Kate, realizing that Abel suspects her, does not answer him until he tosses her onto her bed menacingly. Shaken, she relates that it was Dr. Watkins who told her the dog’s name. Deducing that Watkins has known Murphy for a long time, Abel arrests him for the murders. Watkins escapes by injecting Abel with an animal euthanasia drug. Abel manages to radio in a call for help but passes out while chasing Watkins.

Abel wakes up in hospital. He learns from Streeter that the drug has been flushed from his system and Watkins has so far evaded capture. The next morning Abel tracks down the veterinarian, who asserts that he did not kill anyone. As they walk downstairs, Watkins' wife hits Abel from behind. Watkins runs outside, where he is shot by Streeter. Over her husband's dead body, Mrs. Watkins reveals that she was Jenny's lover, but when Jenny seduced the doctor as well, she killed Jenny and Lee Campbell, and her husband helped to cover both crimes.

== Cast ==
- James Garner as Police Chief Abel Marsh
- Katharine Ross as Kate Bingham
- Hal Holbrook as Dr. Warren Watkins
- Harry Guardino as Captain Daniel Streeter
- June Allyson as Mrs. Watkins
- Tom Ewell as Walter
- Peter Lawford as Campbell
- Edmond O'Brien as George
- Arthur O'Connell as Ernie
- Ann Rutherford as Gloria
- Art Metrano as Malcolm
- Christopher Connelly as John
- Harry Masch as Mayor Wendell
- Jenifer Shaw as Diana
- Jason Wingreen as Mallory
- Robert Nichols as Doctor Peterson
- Norma Connolly as Mrs. DeCamp
- David Westberg as State Trooper
- Lee Pulford as Jenny Campbell
- Royce D. Applegate as Harry
- Alma Beltram as Rosa

== Production notes ==
The movie was filmed from late July to early September, 1972. It was the last major film shot on MGM's backlot before it was sold and redeveloped. Several former MGM stars accepted supporting roles in the film because it gave them the opportunity to be in the last film shot on the backlot. Some scenes were filmed on the "Carvel Street" used to make the Andy Hardy films. Film cast member Ann Rutherford had been in 17 of the Hardy pictures.

Other scenes were filmed at the Paradise Cove Pier, Paradise Cove in Malibu, California. Two years later, when Garner starred in the television series The Rockford Files, Rockford's trailer was also located at Paradise Cove.

The small town police chief concept and its main character Abel Marsh were reworked several times by writer Lane Slate. The first attempt followed a year later with Isn't It Shocking?, starring Alan Alda as similar character Dan Barnes and the setting relocated to rural New England, though filmed in Oregon. 1974 brought a similar character named Sam McNeill (Andy Griffith) in Winter Kill, intended as the pilot for a series set in a California mountain resort. Griffith tried again in 1975 with the short-lived TV series Adams of Eagle Lake, which lasted two episodes; the character was renamed Sam Adams. Two more reworkings followed in 1976 and 1977 starring Griffith, with the character's name restored to Abel Marsh: The Girl in the Empty Grave and Deadly Game.

== See also ==
- List of American films of 1972
