= Odds On =

Novel by Michael Crichton

- First edition cover
- Author: John Lange
- Language: English
- Publisher: Signet Books
- Publication date: 1966
- Publication place: United States
- Media type: Print (Paperback)
- Pages: 215
- LC Class: PS3553.R48
- Followed by: Scratch One

Odds On is Michael Crichton's first published novel. It was released in 1966 under the pseudonym of John Lange. It is a short 215-page paperback novel. Hard Case Crime republished the novel under Crichton's name on November 19, 2013. Prior to the reissue, copies were rare and hard to find.

== Plot summary ==
It describes an attempt of robbery in an isolated hotel on Costa Brava. The robbery is planned with the help of a Critical Path Analysis computer program, but unforeseen events get in the way.

The three Americans needed cover, as lone men stood out. So each decided he would pick up a girl, and mingle with the crowd.

=== The women ===
- Annette was a working girl who did her best work after hours.
- Cynthia was nymphomaniac who liked marijuana and men—often together.
- Jenny was a rich girl who wanted to be loved for her body.

The women were irrelevant, as the men's real interest was the hotel's safe, which would net them a million dollars in jewels, cash, and traveler's checks. The crime was conceived. It was masterminded by a modern computer. But then they forgot the biggest risk of all—the women, and sex.

== Structure and format ==
As in many other Crichton novels the chapters are named by date as in a diary, rather than by number or other content. In this particular novel the chapters reflect the total time span, the ticking clock, of the plot as a whole. The fifteen chapters begin with Saturday, June Fourteenth, and end with Afternoon, June Twenty-Second. The time span of the story is just a little more than a week, which is yet another similarity to Crichton's later novels.

Being his first book, it also contains some of Crichton's 'trademarks' for the first time. Among other things, Crichton started his tradition of beginning his novels with quotes:

"There are three kinds of lies: lies, damned lies, and statistics."
– Benjamin Disraeli

== Background ==
Crichton wrote the book in 1965 while a student at Harvard Medical School. He sent it to Doubleday for consideration under the name "John Lange". A reader at Doubleday loved the book but thought it was "too saucy" for that company, and sent it on to a friend at New American Library.

Crichton used the name John Lange because at this stage he planned to be a doctor and did not want his patients worried he would use them for his plots. The name came from a fairy tale writer called Andrew Lang; Crichton added an "e" and substituted his own real first name, John, for Andrew.

== Proposed adaptation ==
In 1969, around the time film rights were bought for Crichton's The Andromeda Strain, independent producer Sam Roy bought the film rights to Odds On. However, no movie was made.
