= Easy Go (novel) =

Novel by Michael Crichton

- First edition cover
- Author: John Lange
- Language: English
- Publisher: Signet Books
- Publication date: 1968
- Publication place: United States
- Media type: Print (Paperback)
- Pages: 204
- LC Class: PS3553.R48
- Preceded by: Scratch One
- Followed by: A Case of Need

Easy Go is Michael Crichton's third published novel, as well as the third to feature his pen name John Lange. It was released in 1968 under the pseudonym of John Lange. Re-released in 1974 by Bantam Books as The Last Tomb. Hard Case Crime republished the novel under Crichton's name on October 29, 2013.

According to one source, it was the first book Crichton wrote and took him a week, earning him $1,500.

== Plot summary ==
Harold Barnaby is a brilliant Egyptologist who has discovered a hidden message while translating some hieroglyphics. The message tells of an unnamed Pharaoh whose tomb hasn't been discovered yet. Barnaby is exhilarated by the discovery and the prospect of the fame and fortune that will come with it. There is only one problem. He doesn't have the knowledge, influence or wherewithal to pull off such a job without alerting the Egyptian authorities who would surely encroach on his discovery.

Luckily, Barnaby meets Robert Pierce, a transient freelance writer who is in between jobs and looking for some excitement. In a moment of drunken indiscretion, Barnaby shares his discovery with Pierce along with his small logistical problem. Pierce, who because of his job has many friends in high—and low—places, offers his services to plan and manage the "extraction". For a cut, of course.

He brings on Lord Grover, the fifth Earl of Wheatston to bankroll the project; smuggler Alan Conway; and international thief, Nikos Karagannis. Together, this motley crew set up camp in the harsh conditions of the Egyptian desert and "dig in" for the long haul. Their task is made all-the-more challenging when an Egyptian official becomes suspicious of their activities.

== Film Adaptation ==
In 1975 it was announced producers David Foster and Lawrence Turman had optioned the novel and were going to make a movie for Warner Bros under the title The Last Tomb. It was to be shot in Egypt and directed by Crichton himself. However the film was never made.
