= A Case of Need =

Novel by Michael Crichton

- First edition cover
- Author: Michael Crichton (writing as Jeffery Hudson)
- Language: English
- Genre: Mystery novel, Medical thriller
- Published: 1968
- Publisher: World Publishing Co.
- Publication place: United States
- Media type: Print (Hardcover)
- Pages: 243
- LC Class: PS3553.R48
- Preceded by: Easy Go
- Followed by: Zero Cool

A Case of Need is a medical thriller/mystery novel written by Michael Crichton, his fourth novel and the only under the pseudonym Jeffery Hudson. It was first published in 1968 by The World Publishing Company (New York) and won an Edgar Award in 1969.

The novel was adapted into the 1972 film The Carey Treatment. It was re-released in 1993 under Crichton's own name. The novel tackles the issues of abortion and racism as they were in late 1960s America and includes several non-fiction appendixes.

== Plot summary ==
Dr. John Berry is a pathologist working in Boston when abortion is illegal in the United States. Dr. Berry's colleague, obstetrician Arthur Lee, has been arrested for performing an abortion that led to the death of 17-year old Karen Randall, a member of a prominent Boston medical dynasty. Berry helped Lee disguise medical samples to hide the fact that Lee's dilation and curettage patients were pregnant.

Berry pretends to be Lee's lawyer to visit him in jail. Lee insists he did not perform the abortion. Berry sets out to prove Lee's innocence. He is beset by a hostile police captain and J.D. Randall, a prominent surgeon and Karen's father. He eventually discovers Karen was promiscuous and a heavy drug user.

Berry discovers that Peter Randall, Karen's uncle, had already performed three abortions for Karen. However, when she asked for a fourth, Peter refused. Berry confirms that Karen was not pregnant. He deduces that she had a benign thyroid tumor which was presenting symptoms of pregnancy.

Following the trail of Karen's life, Berry comes across a nurse named Angela and a drug dealer named Roman. He asks Roman about Karen, but he denies ever meeting her. While he follows Roman, he is brutally attacked. He ends up in the emergency room with severe cuts to his face and internal bleeding. While he is there, Roman and Angela are admitted. Roman has been bludgeoned and dies. Angela has some minor cuts.

Knowing she is a morphine addict and a nurse, Berry pretends to inject her with Nalorphine, having replaced it with water. Angela falls for the placebo and begs for morphine to counteract the withdrawal symptoms. She confesses to performing Karen's abortion with Roman in exchange for drug money.

Roman had tried to kill Angela because she could link him to Karen. When her uncle happened on the scene, he hit Roman with a chair and killed him. Berry convinces him to tell the police what happened. Lee decides to move to California to start over after being revealed as an abortionist, despite being exonerated for Karen's death.

Appendix I: Delicatessen Pathologists summarizes food metaphors used in the practice, like chicken-fat clots and oat-cell carcinoma.

Appendix II: Cops and Doctors explains how wary doctors are of cooperating with law enforcement.

Appendix III: Battlefields and Barberpoles discusses the culture difference between surgeons and physicians.

Appendix IV: Abbreviations dwells on the medical profession's affection for acronyms.

Appendix V: Whites is a pocket history of the white coat.

Appendix VI: Arguments on Abortion is an overview of the abortion debate. It concludes with a closer look at Garrett Hardin's pro-choice argument which is quoted in the novel's epigraph.

== Background ==
Crichton had published several novels under the pseudonym John Lange but felt since this one was more serious than the Lange books it needed to come out under a different name. He planned to write further Jeffrey Hudson books about medical fiction, but this did not come about. The pen name Jeffrey Hudson came from the name of a dwarf in the time of King Charles I of England, who was served to the monarch in a pie and later captured by Barbary Pirates.

The novel was republished in hardcover under Crichton's name in 1993. Crichton was furious at this, called the action "despicable", and said it misled the public into thinking it was a new novel.
