= Scratch One =

Novel by Michael Crichton

- First edition cover
- Author: John Lange
- Language: English
- Publisher: Signet Books
- Publication date: September 1967
- Publication place: United States
- Media type: Print (Paperback)
- Pages: 192
- LC Class: PS3553.R48
- Preceded by: Odds On
- Followed by: Easy Go

Scratch One is Michael Crichton's second novel to be published, as well as the second novel to be under his pseudonym John Lange. It was released in 1967 under the pseudonym of John Lange. It is a short 192-page paperback novel. Hard Case Crime republished the novel under Crichton's name on October 29, 2013.

== Plot summary ==
Roger Carr has a lot going for him. He's a handsome, charming and privileged man who practices law—more as a means to support his playboy lifestyle than a career. Thanks to his father, who is a powerful politician, Carr has many connections. For this reason, his law associates tolerate him and keep him around.

Carr is sent to Nice, France by one of his wealthy political connections to find and secure the purchase of a villa. Little does he know that this cushy assignment is going to put him in the middle of an arms deal investigation involving the CIA and a gang called the Associates.

Both sides mistake him for someone else—an American assassin—and neither side can understand why Carr is ignoring them. The CIA take it as a sign of defiance while the Associates perceive him as a cool and collected professional, who knows exactly what he's doing and is difficult to predict.

Carr becomes slowly aware that something strange is going on. He's not sure...but he thinks someone may be trying to kill him. The worst part of it is, he has no clue as to why.

What happens next will send Carr on a thrilling roller-coaster ride involving fast cars, fast women and international terrorists.

== Background ==
Crichton wrote the book while travelling through Europe on a travel fellowship. He visited the Cannes Film Festival and Monaco Grand Prix and then decided "any idiot should be able to write a potboiler set in Cannes and Monaco" and wrote it in eleven days. He later described the book as "no good".

== Reception ==
One critic from the Chicago Daily News wrote "the novelist... doesn't start his suspense slowly, building to a climax. Even before you're settled in your chair he grabs you by the throat and never lets you go... the writing is crisp, the violence surgically exact, the sex unobtrusive and the humour just right." The New York Times called it "wonderful escape reading".
