= Gregory Manchess =

American illustrator

Gregory Manchess is an American illustrator from Kentucky. His illustrations have appeared in magazines, digital murals, illustrated movie posters, advertising campaigns, and book covers, including sixty covers for Louis L’Amour. His work has appeared on Major League Baseball World Series Programs, Time, Newsweek, The Atlantic Monthly, Playboy, Smithsonian and National Geographic. He has also designed several NASA mission patches, including that of Artemis II. His style includes broad brush strokes and figure work.

== Career ==
Gregory Manchess earned a BFA from the Minneapolis College of Art and Design in 1977. He spent the next two years as a studio illustrator with Hellman Design Associates which was led by Gary Kelley.

He lectures frequently at universities and colleges nationwide and gives workshops on painting at the Norman Rockwell Museum in Stockbridge, Massachusetts. He leads an Illustration Master Class in Amherst, Massachusetts.

Manchess's first graphic novel, Above the Timberline, was published by Saga Press in 2017. Original artworks from the book were on display at the Norman Rockwell Museum. He is represented by Richard Solomon.

== Work ==
- Abraham Lincoln Presidential Library and Museum in Springfield, Illinois – Portraits of Abraham Lincoln
- National Geographic Society expedition to the Fond du Lac river in Canada for the 1996 article "David Thomson: The Man Who Measured Canada"
- National Geographic Society illustrations for "The Wreck of the C.S.S. Alabama"
- National Geographic exhibition – “Real Pirates: The Untold Story of The Whydah, from Slave Ship to Pirate Ship”
- The Chronicles of Narnia: The Lion, the Witch and the Wardrobe – Concept Illustrator 2005
- 2009 Oregon Statehood Stamp by the United States Postal Service
- Literary Arts series; Mark Twain Stamp by the United States Postal Service
- NASA mission patches
  - SpaceX Crew-1
  - SpaceX Crew-2
  - SpaceX Crew-3
  - Expedition 67
  - Artemis II

== Book covers ==
- Nightrunners. Joe R. Lansdale, Dean Koontz 1987
- Ninja Vol III Warrior Path of Togakure by Stephen K. Hayes 1991
- To Capture The Wind. Sheila MacGill-Callahan. August 1997
- Nanuk: Lord of the Ice. Brian Heinz. 1999
- Cover Her Face. Simon & Schuster. P. D. James 2001
- Stories of Your Life and Others. Tor Books. Ted Chiang 2002
- Death of an Expert Witness. Simon & Schuster. P. D. James 2001
- The Alchemist's Door. Macmillan. Lisa Goldstein 2003
- Dreamer of Dune: The Biography of Frank Herbert. Macmillan. Brian Herbert 2004
- The Knight. Tor Books. Gene Wolfe. January 2004
- Giving Thanks. Turtleback School & Library Binding. Jonathan London. September 2005
- The Last River: John Wesley Powell and the Colorado River Exploring Expedition. Mikaya Press. Stuart Waldman. October 2005
- Cheyenne Medicine Hat. Brian Heinz. September 2006
- Grania: She-King of the Irish Seas. Morgan Llywelyn. February 2007
- The Vengeful Virgin. Gil Brewer. April 2007
- Magellan's World Mikaya Press. Stuart Waldman. October 2007
- Glory Road. Macmillan. Robert A. Heinlein and Samuel R. Delany. 2008
- An Irish Country Doctor, Macmillan, Patrick Taylor 2011
- Real Pirates: The Untold Story of the Whydah from Slave Ship to Pirate Ship. National Geographic Books. Barry Clifford. 2008
- Zero Cool. Michael Crichton (as "John Lange"), March 2008
- Lamentation (The Psalms of Isaak, Volume 2) Tor Books, Ken Scholes February 2009
- Lobster Johnson: The Satan Factory, Dark Horse, Thomas E. Sniegoski June 2009
- Canticle (The Psalms of Isaak, Volume 2) Tor Books, Ken Scholes October 2009
- Robert E Howard's Complete Conan of Cimmeria 1935: v.3 (Leather Bound Edition) Book Palace Books, Robert E. Howard February 2010
- An Irish Country Girl: A Novel. Macmillan. Patrick Taylor 2011
- A Weeping Czar Beholds the Fallen Moon. Tor Books. Ken Scholes
- Looking for Truth in a Wild Blue Yonder. Tor Books. Ken Scholes and Jay Lake
- The Starship Mechanic. Tor Books. Ken Scholes and Jay Lake

== Awards ==
Nominated for a Caldecott Medal in 1977

Society of Illustrators New York

- Gold medal
- Silver medals
- Hamilton King Award in 1999
- Stephan Dohanos Award in 2000

Society of Illustrators Los Angeles

- Silver medals
- Best in Show Award.

Artist's Magazine

- First Prize Wildlife Art Competition 1990

Communication Arts

- 1995
- Featured in 1996, 1998, and 2000 in Step-By-Step Graphics.

Spectrum

- Silver medal in 2001

== Exhibitions ==
- Eleanor Ettinger Galleries in New York and Hong Kong
- Witham Gallery; Ohio – 1997
- Walt Reed Gallery; Westport, Connecticut – “The Illustrator in America, 1860–2000”.
- Members Gallery at the Society of Illustrators – February 1, 2011 – February 26, 2011
- Arte Verissima Gallery – "Weightless" – January 24, 2015 – March 8, 2015
