= Chuck Pyle =

American country music singer-songwriter (1945–2015)

- Also known as: Zen Cowboy
- Born: January 28, 1945; Pittsburgh, Pennsylvania, U.S.
- Died: November 6, 2015 (aged 70) Colorado Springs, Colorado, U.S.
- Genres: Country, folk
- Occupations: Singer, songwriter, guitarist

Chuck Pyle (January 28, 1945 – November 6, 2015), also known as the "Zen Cowboy", was an American country-folk singer-songwriter and guitarist whose career spanned more than 40 years, during which he recorded 13 albums.

== Early years ==
Chuck Pyle was born in Pittsburgh, Pennsylvania, and raised in Newton, Iowa where he sang in the school choir. He was the adopted son of Lyle, a railroad conductor, and Julie, a school teacher. Pyle dropped out of college in his home state of Iowa and moved to Boulder, Colorado in 1965, hoping to build a career in music.

== Career ==
In 1970, having made minor progress as a musician, he was invited to a cabin in Gold Hill that was owned by songwriter Steve Fromholtz. There, he met the musicians John Cable and Richard Dean. Soon, Cable and Pyle joined forces in the five-piece band Colours, with Pyle as a bass player.

Pyle's vocal abilities and songwriting talents made him well known in country music songwriting circles. Pyle wrote “Other Side of the Hill” and performed with the Nitty Gritty Dirt Band on their 1985 album Partners, Brothers and Friends. It was titled "Cadillac Cowboy" when performed by Chris LeDoux (it appeared on LeDoux’s 1988 album Chris LeDoux and the Saddle Boogie Band). He also wrote Jerry Jeff Walker's "Jaded Lover" (which appeared on Walker's 1975 album Ridin' High). During his career, Pyle wrote songs recorded by John Denver, Suzy Bogguss, Gary P. Nunn, the Nitty Gritty Dirt Band, Owen Temple. He also made numerous appearances on radio and television over the years to include Colorado Public Radio and Austin City Limits.

In January 2015, Chuck Pyle released his last album, Cover Stories. It is a collection of 12 songs from lesser-known songwriters he admired, Hayes Carll, Lynn Miles, and Walt Wilkins, Pete & Lou Berryman's among others. On the album, Pyle was accompanied by Gordon Burt on fiddle and Don Richmond on steel guitar, dobro and mandolin.

Nevertheless, Chuck Pyle never gained widespread acclaim. He only had a minor chart success in 1985 with "Drifter’s Wind" taken from his album Drifter’s Wind. The song reached #60 on the Billboard Hot Country Songs charts. Other self-produced albums followed in the years after, Endless Sky, Camel Rock, Affected By The Moon.

Pyle also composed and sang the theme to Rocky Mountain PBS's long running documentary series The Spirit of Colorado.

== Death ==
Chuck Pyle died on November 6, 2015, at the age of 70. Pyle was found floating face down on Palmer Lake. He was pronounced dead at Penrose Hospital, Colorado Springs, Colorado. According to an autopsy report released by the El Paso Country Coroner's Office, Chuck Pyle drowned just after 8 p.m. while fly-fishing near his home in Palmer Lake, Colorado, atherosclerosis - a disease in the arteries - could have also contributed to his death.
