= Ryuko (manga) =

Japanese manga by Eldo Yoshimizu

- First volume cover (Leed Publishing edition, released in 2023)

龍子 RYUKO (Ryūko)
- Genre: Crime thriller
- Manga
- Written by: Eldo Yoshimizu
- Published by: Self-published; Le Lézard Noir (Note: First printed publication in France); Leed Publishing (Note: First official release in Japan)
- English publisher: NA/UK: Titan Publishing Group
- Published: 2010 (self-publication); 2016–2018 (French publication); 2023 (official Japanese publication)
- Volumes: 2
- Manga

Ryuko: Hua Gang Arc
- Written by: Eldo Yoshimizu
- Published by: Leed Publishing
- Magazine: Torch Web
- Original run: April 27, 2026 – present
- icon

Ryuko (龍子 RYUKO, Ryūko) is a Japanese manga written and illustrated by Eldo Yoshimizu. It was self-published in 2010, and later published in two hardcover volumes in France by Le Lézard Noir in 2016 and 2018. In the United Kingdom and North America the manga was licensed by Titan Publishing Group. Leed Publishing published the first volume in Japan in 2023. A new story arc, titled Ryuko: Hua Gang Arc, started on Leed Publishing's Torch Web digital manga platform in April 2026.

== Publication ==
Written and illustrated by Eldo Yoshimizu, Ryuko was self-published in 2010. The manga was first published in hardcover volumes in France by Le Lézard Noir, with two volumes released on November 17, 2016, and February 1, 2018. It was later published in eleven other countries, including Italy and Germany. Leed Publishing later released the first volume in Japan on September 14, 2023, and the second on January 18, 2024.

In the United Kingdom and North America the manga was licensed by Titan Publishing Group. The two volumes were released on August 6 and October 15, 2019, respectively.

A new story arc, titled Ryuko: Hua Gang Arc (龍子 RYUKO 華港(ワーコン)編, Ryūko Wākon-hen), started on Leed Publishing's Torch Web digital manga platform on April 27, 2026. The writing of the story took four years.

== Reception ==
Ryuko ranked thirteenth on Takarajimasha's Kono Manga ga Sugoi! 2024 list of best manga for male readers. It placed fourth on "The Best Manga 2024 Kono Manga wo Yome!" ranking by Freestyle magazine.
