= Dealing: or the Berkeley-to-Boston Forty-Brick Lost-Bag Blues =

1970 novel by Michael Crichton

Dealing: Or the Berkeley-to-Boston Forty-Brick Lost-Bag Blues
- First edition cover
- Author: Michael Douglas
- Language: English
- Publisher: Alfred A. Knopf
- Publication date: 1970
- Publication place: United States
- Media type: Print (hardcover)
- Pages: 222
- ISBN: 0-394-42168-X
- LC Class: PS3554.O83
- Preceded by: Drug of Choice
- Followed by: Grave Descend

Dealing: Or the Berkeley-to-Boston Forty-Brick Lost-Bag Blues is a novel written by Michael Crichton, his ninth published novel. Authorship credit is shared with his brother Douglas Crichton, resulting in the only time the pseudonym Michael Douglas was used. It was originally published in 1970. It was serialized in the December 1970, January 1971, and February 1971 issues of Playboy magazine.

== Plot summary ==
In order to hook up with his new California girlfriend, a Harvard graduate involves her in an ill-fated plan to smuggle a suitcase full of marijuana bricks from Berkeley to Boston.

== Background ==
Crichton wrote the book with his brother, who was then 19 years old. He said he wrote it "completely from beginning to end". Then his brother rewrote it from beginning to end, and then Crichton rewrote it again.

Crichton said the novel was "interesting to me because it attacks what is to most people a puzzling area. What really happens to nice, middle-class, well-educated, suburban, bright kids who get into drugs? Why do they get into the position of having these experiences? The book is not sociology; it's fiction, but it pokes at some of these things."

== Reception ==
The critic from the Los Angeles Times called it an "unremarkable tale" with a "paucity of plot" but thought the ending was "exciting".

== Film adaptation ==
A film version of the book was released in 1972. It was an American independent film directed by Paul Williams. It stars Robert F. Lyons and features John Lithgow in his film debut in the supporting role of John, the campus drug dealer. Barbara Hershey appears in the role of Susan, the novice drug-courier who loses the bag of bricks on a cross-country flight from Berkeley to Boston.
