= Zero Cool =

1969 novel by Michael Crichton

- First edition cover
- Author: John Lange
- Language: English
- Published: 1969 (Signet Books)
- Publication place: United States
- Media type: Print (Paperback)
- Pages: 192
- LC Class: PS3553.R48
- Preceded by: A Case of Need
- Followed by: The Venom Business

Zero Cool is Michael Crichton's fifth published novel, and the fourth to feature his pseudonym John Lange. It was released in 1969.

== Plot ==
An American doctor goes to Spain to present a paper at a conference and take a holiday. He meets a mysterious woman and is asked to perform an autopsy on a member of the underworld. He finds himself in a conspiracy to obtain a jewel.

== Re-release ==
The novel was re-released in 2008 as part of the Hard Case Crime series. For this release, Crichton wrote two short new framing chapters, in addition to doing an overall revision of the text. Hard Case Crime republished the novel under Crichton's name on November 19, 2013.
