= The Colorado Kid =

2005 novel by Stephen King

- First edition cover
- Author: Stephen King
- Cover artist: Glen Orbik
- Language: English
- Genre: Mystery, crime
- Publisher: Hard Case Crime
- Publication date: October 4, 2005
- Publication place: United States
- Media type: Print (Paperback)
- Pages: 184
- ISBN: 978-0-8439-5584-2

The Colorado Kid is a mystery novel by American writer Stephen King, published by the Hard Case Crime imprint in 2005. The book was initially issued in one paperback-only edition by the specialty crime and mystery publishing house. King's next novel for Hard Case Crime was Joyland, which was published in June 2013. Hard Case Crime reissued The Colorado Kid in an illustrated paperback edition in May 2019.

The third-person narrative concerns the investigation of the body of an unidentified man found on a tiny island off the coast of Maine. Lacking any identification or obvious clues, the case reaches nothing but repeated dead ends. Over a year later, the man is identified, but all further important questions remain unanswered. The two-person staff of the island newspaper maintain a longstanding fascination with the case, and twenty-five years later, use the mysterious tale to ply the friendship and test the investigative mettle of a post-graduate intern rookie reporter.

A television series loosely inspired by The Colorado Kid, titled Haven, aired on Syfy from July 2010 to December 2015.

== Plot summary ==
Opening in medias res as the news staff of The Weekly Islander pays for lunch at a restaurant, editor Dave Bowie and founder Vince Teague test young intern Stephanie McCann's powers of deduction regarding their unorthodox tipping procedure. She impresses them by discerning that the restaurant management pools all the tips and splits them equally among the staff, while Dave and Vince want to leave an especially large tip earmarked for their waitress who has fallen on hard times. They discuss some local unsolved crimes and oddities, which have gained circulation in mainland newspapers as far away as Boston during the traditional Halloween season interest in such tales. The friendly assessment becomes more intense as the elderly island natives and Stephanie return to the office, and she asks if the veteran reporters have "ever come across a real unexplained mystery". Dave and Vince take turns recounting a strange incident and investigation.

On April 24, 1980, two teenagers stumbled across a man's body, early in the morning. Slumped against a trash can, and carrying no identification, the body bore no clear indicators of foul play. Cause of death was determined to be asphyxiation, as a large chunk of steak was extracted from the victim's throat. Every potential clue leads to small revelations, but bigger mysteries. Though the investigation is lightly bungled, everything seems inexplicable, from how the fish-dinner stomach contents could line up with his ferry boat crossing, to the single Russian coin in his pocket, and the pack of cigarettes missing one cigarette when the autopsy indicated he was not a smoker.

More than a year later, thanks to a sharp-eyed rookie spotting an out-of-state cigarette tax stamp among the man's personal effects, the John Doe becomes known as The Colorado Kid. Eventually the man's identity is traced: James Cogan of Nederland, Colorado. He was a commercial artist living a normal middle-class life with his wife, last seen at a seemingly average workday before inexplicably disappearing. There was no hint of money troubles, adultery, drug addiction or mental illness—the factors normally associated with someone leaving home so suddenly. Everyone involved with the case is at a loss as to how or why the man could have traveled over 2,000 miles (3,000 km) in the five hours between when he was last sighted in Colorado and first sighted in Maine, when there was at the time no direct airline flight to account for his arrival.

In the Weekly Islander offices, the three friends, old and new, ferret out all the answers they can from the facts of the 25-year-old investigation, then speculate on what might have happened, and meditate on the nature of true mysteries. Despite the lack of clear evidence, Dave and Vince hypothesize the Colorado Kid was murdered. He probably flew to Maine on a chartered jet under an uncertain but pressing emergency and carried the Colorado cigarettes as a clue to his origins should he come to harm. Though Dave and Vince shared other unsolved crimes and oddities with outsiders, they have kept the Colorado Kid a secret due to their belief that a big-town newspaper or glossy travel magazine would tell the story inaccurately by wanting to provide resolution to the account that stubbornly defied a clean culmination. They inform Stephanie that while they were "the last people alive who know the whole thing", having heard the tale of The Colorado Kid, "Now there's you, Steffi." The warm proclamation seems to signal the young woman's final approval by the old guard of the Islander.

== Characters ==
Dave Bowie
The 65-year-old managing editor of The Weekly Islander, the small-circulation newspaper servicing the island of Moose-Lookit, surrounding isles and some mainland communities.
Stephanie McCann
A 22-year-old Ohio University graduate on summer internship at the Islander. Her duties on the paper involve writing "mostly ads" and the "Arts 'N Things" column. Though struggling with the local dialect and sedate rhythms of island life, Stephanie is growing increasingly fond of the newspaper staff, and finding they have unique, important lessons in journalism in store for her.
Vince Teague
The 90-year-old founder of the Islander, who transformed the paper from the Weekly Shopper and Trading Post in 1948.
The Colorado Kid (James Cogan)
Unidentified body found in 1980 on Hammock Beach, wearing gray slacks and a white shirt. With little but a wad of meat lodged in his throat, and a nearly full pack of cigarettes in his pocket, there seem to be no indicators to his identity, or how he arrived on Moose-Lookit.

== King's comments about a clue ==
King noted on his personal website on October 7, 2005, that an apparent research error regarding the rise of Seattle, Washington-based Starbucks Coffee may hold other implications, tying the book's story to the same shared universe of many of his other novels: "The review of The Colorado Kid in today’s issue of today's USA Today mentions that there was no Starbucks in Denver in 1980. Don’t assume that’s a mistake on my part. The constant readers of the Dark Tower series may realize that is not necessarily a continuity error, but a clue."

== Editions ==
The Colorado Kid was originally published in 2005 as a paperback original by Hard Case Crime. In 2007, PS Publishing published the novel as a hardcover limited edition in four different states illustrated by three different artists (Edward Miller, J.K. Potter, and Glenn Chadbourne).

An audiobook of The Colorado Kid was produced by Simon & Schuster Audio, narrated by Jeffrey DeMunn.

== Television adaptation ==
In 2009, Universal Networks International announced the TV series Haven, loosely based on the setting of the novel. The series, which had an initial 13-episode commitment, was developed by E1 Entertainment and Piller/Segan/Shepherd, producers of the Dead Zone TV series. Scott Shepherd served as showrunner, with Lloyd Segan and Shawn Piller executive producing, together with the writers of the series pilot, Sam Ernst and Jim Dunn. The show debuted on Syfy on July 9, 2010, and ran for five seasons until December 17, 2015.
