= Robert McGinnis =

American artist (1926–2025)

- Born: Robert Edward McGinnis; February 3, 1926; Cincinnati, Ohio, U.S.
- Died: March 10, 2025 (aged 99); Old Greenwich, Connecticut, U.S.
- Occupation: Artist; illustrator
- Spouse: Ferne Mitchell (m. 1948; died 2023)
- Children: 3

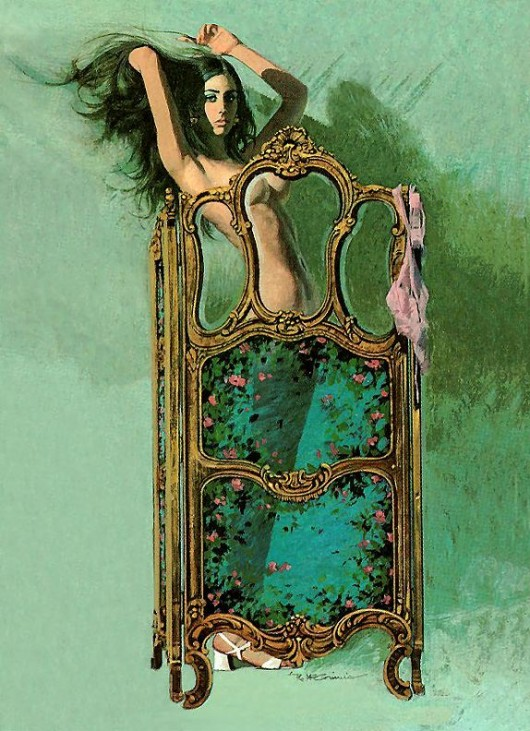
Cover of Carter Brown's novel Nymph to the Slaughter by Robert McGinnis, 1963

Robert Edward McGinnis (February 3, 1926 – March 10, 2025) was an American artist and illustrator. McGinnis is known for his illustrations of more than 1,200 paperback book covers, and more than 40 movie posters, including Breakfast at Tiffany's (his first movie poster assignment), Barbarella, and several James Bond and Matt Helm movies.

== Early life ==
Robert "Bob" Edward McGinnis was born on February 3, 1926 in Cincinnati, Ohio to Nolan McGinnis (1896-1981) and Mildred (nee Finch, 1899-1978). One of six children, he was raised in Wyoming, Ohio. His father was a construction worker. A talented artist himself his father, once it became evident that his son also had talent, encouraged his son’s talent for drawing, with his mother enrolling him in Saturday morning drawing classes at the Cincinnati Art Museum.

A high school art teacher was able to obtain him an apprenticeship at the Walt Disney Studios in California. McGinnis hitchhiked to California to take the job. After the entry of the United States into World War II caused the studio to reduce their output of animated movies to concentrate on training and morale raising movies McGinniss served for a time in Merchant Marine. He then returned home to study fine art at Ohio State University.While there he played for the University’s football team, which was undefeated in 1944. He left university before graduating. By approximately 1947, he was studying at a private art school run by Jackson Grey Storey.

== Career ==
During the late 1940s, McGinnis took a job in Cincinnati with advertising art studio where he drew mattress and television set advertisements for departments stores. A meeting with respected illustrator Coby Whitmore inspired McGinnis to relocate in 1953 with his wife to New York where he worked for the Fredman Chaite Studios, where he produced advertising material. As well as Whitmore, among the other artists working there at the time included Frank Kalan, Frank McCarthy, Robert "Bob" M. Peak and Jack Thurston.

A chance meeting with Mitchell Hooks in 1958 resulted in him being introduced to Dell Publishing, where he began a career drawing a variety of paperback covers for books written by such authors as Donald Westlake (writing as Richard Stark), Edward S. Aarons, Erle Stanley Gardner, Richard S. Prather, and the Michael Shayne and Carter Brown series.

McGinnis later did artwork for Ladies' Home Journal, Woman's Home Companion, Good Housekeeping, TIME, Argosy, Guideposts, and The Saturday Evening Post. He was main title designer for The Hallelujah Trail (1965).

McGinnis's attention to detail was such that when he was assigned to do the artwork for Arabesque he requested Sophia Loren's tiger stripe dress be sent for him for a model to wear so he could get the right appearance.

In 1985, McGinnis was awarded the title of "Romantic Artist of the Year" by Romantic Times magazine for his many romance novel paperback covers, some of them considered to be clinch covers.

During later years, McGinnis created cover illustrations for the Hard Case Crime paperback series, and painted a number of retro-style covers for reissues of books by Neil Gaiman.

McGinnis was a member of the Society of Illustrators Hall of Fame. McGinnis is the subject of a documentary movie, Robert McGinnis: Painting the Last Rose of Summer, by Paul Jilbert.

== Personal life and death ==
In 1948, McGinnis married Ferne Mitchell, whom he had met while attending university. Born on September 17, 1926, she died on February 19, 2023 after 75 years of marriage. Robert McGinnis died on March 10th, 2025, at his home in Old Greenwich, Connecticut. He was 99 years old. The couple had three children, Melinda, Laurie and Kyle.

After his death, The New York Times's Trip Gabriel wrote that McGinnis's illustrations "defined an era," noting his "lusty, photorealistic artwork of curvaceous women".

== Works ==
=== Book covers ===
- Harry Whittington: Shack Road Girl, Berkley (1959)
- A. A. Fair: Crows Can't Count, Dell (1960)
- Brett Halliday: Date with a Dead Man, Dell (1960)
- Robert Dietrich: Murder on Her Mind, 1st Edition (1960)
- Marjorie Lee: The Lion House, Fawcett (1960)
- Leo Margulies: Mike Shayne's Torrid Twelve, Dell First Edition (1961)
- Brett Halliday: Murder Takes No Holiday, Dell (1961)
- Maurice Zolotow: Oh Careless Love, Avon (1961)
- Brett Halliday: The Corpse Came Calling, Dell (1961)
- Ed McBain: Like Love, Pocket Books (1962)
- Jay Scotland: The Veils of Salome, Avon (1962)
- Harry Whittington: Don't Speak to Strange Girls, Fawcett (1963)
- A. S. Fleischman: The Venetian Blonde, Fawcett (1963)
- John D. MacDonald: Soft Touch, Dell (1974)
- Brett Halliday: The Careless Corpse, Dell (1962)
- Brett Halliday: Never Kill a Client, Dell (1963)
- Brett Halliday: The Blonde Cried Murder, Dell (1963)
- Brett Halliday: The Body Came Back, Dell (1964)
- Brett Halliday: A Redhead for Mike Shayne, Dell (1965)
- Brett Halliday: Heads You Lose, Dell (1965)
- Brett Halliday: Murder Spins the Wheel, Dell (1966)
- Brett Halliday: Nice Fillies Finish Last, Dell (1966)
- Brett Halliday: Guilty As Hell, Dell (1967)
- Brett Halliday: This Is It, Michael Shayne, Dell (1968)
- M .E. Chaber: Green Grow the Graves, Paperback Library (1971)
- Bob Vichy: All Together Now, Berkley (1972)
- Richard S. Prather: Dig That Crazy Grave, Fawcett (1972)
- Mary Savage: The Coach Draws Near, Dell (1972)
- Helen McCloy: A Change of Heart, Dell (1974)
- Robert Terrill: Kill Now, Pay Later, Hard Case Crime (2007).

=== Movies ===
All credits are for posters, except where stated.

- Breakfast at Tiffany's (1961)
- The Hallelujah Trail (1965). As well as the movie poster, McGinnis created the artwork for both the title and credit sequences.
- Run For Your Wife (1965)
- Thunderball (1965)
- Any Wednesday (1966)
- Arabesque (1966)
- Gambit (1966)
- How to Steal a Million (1966)
- Murderer's Row (1966)
- The Ambushers (1967)
- Barefoot in the Park (1967)
- Clambake (1967)
- Casino Royale (1967)
- Jack of Diamonds (1967)
- You Only Live Twice (1967)
- Barbarella (1968)
- The Biggest Bundle of Them All (1968)
- Live a Little, Love a Little (1968)
- Stay Away, Joe (1968)
- The Odd Couple (1968)
- The Wrecking Crew (1968)
- Where Were You When the Lights Went Out? (1968)
- Cactus Flower (1969)
- Don't Just Stand There! (1969)
- On Her Majesty's Secret Service (1969)
- Sinful Davey (1969)
- The Assassination Bureau (1969)
- The Great Bank Robbery (1969)
- Sweet Charity (1969)
- Cotton Comes to Harlem (1970)
- How Do I Love Thee? (1970)
- The Private Life of Sherlock Holmes (1970)
- Diamonds Are Forever (1971)
- Duck, You Sucker! (aka A Fistful of Dynamite) (1971)
- Plaza Suite (1971)
- Avanti! (1972)
- Come Back, Charleston Blue (1972)
- Innocent Bystanders (1972)
- The Honkers (1972)
- House of 1000 Pleasures (1973)
- Live and Let Die (1973)
- Scorpio (1973)
- Sleeper (1973)
- The Day of the Dolphin (1973)
- The Optimists of Nine Elms (1973)
- Bread and Chocolate (1974)
- The Four of Us (1974)
- The Man with the Golden Gun (1974)
- The Sugarland Express (1974)
- Thunderbolt and Lightfoot (1974)
- Brannigan (1975)
- The Sunshine Boys (1975)
- The Teasers (1975)
- Gator (1976)
- The Bingo Long Traveling All-Stars & Motor Kings (1976)
- Norman... Is That You? (1976)
- Lets Make a Dirty Movie (1977)
- Semi-Tough (1977)
- The Teasers Go to Paris (1977)
- Comes a Horseman (1978)
- Ffolkes (1979)
- The Man From S.E.X (1979)
- Little Miss Marker (1980)
- Serial (1980)
- Kiss Kiss Bang Bang (2005). McGinnis drew the covers for the fictional Johnny Gossamer novels that appear in the movie.

== Sources ==
- McGinnis, Robert E.; Scott, Art (2014). The Art of Robert E. McGinnis (Hardcover). London: Titian Books. ISBN 9781781162170.
- Fenner, Cathy; Fenner, Arnie (2000). Tapestry: The Paintings of Robert McGinnis. Underwood Books. ISBN 978-1-887424-56-1.
- Scott, Art; McGinnis, Robert E.; Maynard, Wallace (2001). The Paperback Covers of Robert McGinnis: A Complete Listing of the 1,068 Titles and 1,432 Editions of the Paperback Cover Illustrations of Robert McGinnis. Pond Press. ISBN 978-0-9666776-4-5.
