= Speakeasy Dollhouse =

Immersive plays by Cynthia von Buhler (created 2011)

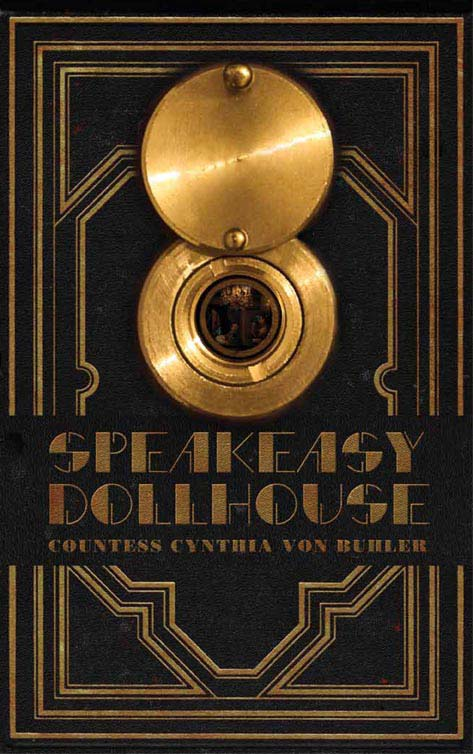

Speakeasy Dollhouse was a series of immersive plays based on Cynthia von Buhler's investigations of mysterious deaths in site-specific historic locations. Original funding for the project was obtained via Kickstarter in 2011. The plays were produced by Russell Farhang and Cynthia von Buhler's production company, Smoosh & Smoosh Inc. The Bloody Beginning opened in New York City in 2011. The Brothers Booth ran in 2014. Ziegfeld's Midnight Frolic opened in Spring 2015.

== Play One: Speakeasy Dollhouse: The Bloody Beginning ==
Episode One, The Bloody Beginning, is based on von Buhler's investigation of the mysterious 1935 murder of her grandfather. The play was written and directed by von Buhler.

=== Synopsis ===
The play presents a series of vignettes that occur over the years 1925 to 1935 and were considered the playwright to be pivotal in the understanding of the climactic moment of Frank Spano's murder. The story extends beyond his death to encompass the hasty trial of Spano's confessed killer but leaves to the audience the final conclusions about why and by whom the murders were committed.

Speakeasy Dollhouse: The Bloody Beginning
- Written by: Cynthia Von Buhler
- Characters: Frank Spano; Mary Spano; Dominick Spano; Cousin Frankie Spano; Anna Spano; John Gurrieri; Lucrezia Gurrieri; Dutch Schultz; Frances Flegenheimer; Dr. Thomas A. Gonzalez; Magistrate Hulon Capshaw; Tammany Hall Leader Jimmy Hines
- Genre: Immersive Theater, Pulp Non-Fiction
- Setting: Bakery, speakeasy club, bedroom, coroner's office, and street scene in New York City between 1925 and 1935.

Premiere
- Date: October 2011
- Place: New York City
- Official website

=== Immersive location ===
Speakeasy Dollhouse is staged in Meyer Lansky's former Lower East Side hangout. Unlike plays presented in a traditional proscenium, the site-specific set design invites the audience to walk freely throughout various rooms of the venue. Designed to mimic the dollhouse-scale sets depicted in the graphic novel, there is a speakeasy bar, private alleyway, club cum living room, bakery, coroner's office and Pre-war bedroom. The audience is encouraged to dress in Roaring Twenties period attire. Upon arrival, each person receives a slip of paper assigning them a unique character to play and instructions to "ignore the advice your parents gave you as children, be nosy and talk to strangers." When not performing predefined scenes, the actors circulate throughout the space, ad libbing in character with everyone in attendance.

=== Dollhouse sets ===
In 1936, as a means to better explore these cases and train investigators of sudden or violent deaths to assess visual evidence, Frances Glessner Lee created the Nutshell Studies of Unexplained Death. These studies consisted of detailed, 1:12 scale dollhouse models that students could examine from every angle. Taking inspiration from the Nutshell Studies, von Buhler recreated the scenes from her grandfather's murder and the events leading up to it using her own handmade sets and dolls. Utilizing evidence gathered from autopsy reports, police records, court documents, and interviews in tandem with the dolls and sets, she has pieced together a variety of probable scenarios to explain the crime.

=== Future publications ===
The play is also being used as research for a graphic novel von Buhler is writing. The limited-edition book funded by Kickstarter was an introduction to the story and explains how she first heard about her grandfather's mysterious death as young girl. In a New York Times interview, von Buhler stated that the follow-up book would be a new genre, "Pulp Non-Fiction".

=== Characters ===
- Frank Spano (Russell Farhang, Pasha Pelosie, E. James Ford): Italian-American immigrant who ran an ice delivery service and two Prohibition Era speakeasies in the Bronx.
- Mary Spano (Dana MacDonald): Italian American immigrant and extremely pious wife of Frank Spano. Born "Maria Sforza" in Bari, Italy.
- Dominick Spano (Rachel Boyadjis): The oldest son of Frank and Mary Spano.
- Cousin Frankie Spano (E. James Ford): Employee of Spano Ice.
- Anna Spano (Esther Westwood): Cousin Frankie's Jewish wife.
- John Guerrieri (Silent James, Dennis Preski): Italian American immigrant who is a neighbor to Frank and Mary Spano and works as a barber. He is charged with Frank Spano's murder.
- Lucrezia Guerrieri (Katelan V. Foisy): Wife of John Guerrieri and mother of four, implied to be having an affair with Frank Spano.
- Dutch Schultz (Travis Moore, Josh Weinstein): Born Arthur Flegenheimer, Schultz is a notorious Jewish mobster whose speakeasies are a competitor to Frank Spano's.
- Frances Flegenheimer (Maria Rusolo): Dutch Schultz's wife.
- Lulu Rosenkrantz (Travis Moore): Dutch Shultz's bodyguard
- Detective Thomas Crane (Justin Moore): Manhattan 17th Precinct detective assigned to handle the murder case.
- Dr. Thomas A Gonzalez (Jeffrey Wengrofsky, Chris Fink, Paul Duncan,): Chief Medical Examiner in New York City at the time of Frank's murder.
- Nurse Bessie Stitch (Heather Bunch, Sarah Moskowitz): Chief Medical Examiner's assistant. Former Gibson Girl.
- Jimmy Hines (Charley Layton): Leader of Democratic Party political machine Tammany Hall.
- Magistrate Hulon Capshaw (Scott Southard): New York City judge in charge of the grand jury trial after Frank Spano's murder, eventually dismissing the case without explanation. He is eventually tried on corruption charges and disbarred.
- Dominick Grimaldi (Uncle Nino): Frank Spano's undertaker.
- Lena Doino (Kat Mon Dieu): Lucrezia Guerrieri's friend and neighbor. Lena's husband Anthony Doino worked for Knickerbocker Ice Company, competitor of Spano Ice.
- Bakery Shop Girl: Kate Black
- Bakery Assistant: Ariel Wolf
- Speakeasy Hostess and Host: Ali Luminescent, Jennifer Harder
- Fortune Teller: Jordana Rollerhoops
- Millie Nelba: Rachel LeWinter, Katie Kat
- 15-year-old Cynthia von Buhler: PJ Mead
- Burlesque Performers: Vary by performance. Past performers have included Veronica Varlow, Lillet St. Sunday, Kat Mon Dieu, Delysia LaChatte, and Porcelain Dalya.
- House Band: Henry Azelrod & The Gut Buckets as played by Howard Fishman and his band.

=== Special guests ===
Alison Wright, a starring actor in the 2013 TV series, The Americans, played Lena Doino at one show in 2014. The undertaker, Dominick Grimaldi, was played by Edgar Oliver from 2011 to 2013, a New York City playwright and poet who frequently appears on the television show Oddities. Dominick Grimaldi was played by Uncle Nino, a New York City celebrity who frequently appeared on Jersey Shore, a reality TV Series. For the June 2012 production, Neil Gaiman appeared as Assistant Coroner and performed a duet of "Makin' Whoopee" with Amanda Palmer.

=== Television ===
Von Buhler, the coroner's office diorama, and the play's secret location were central to an episode of The Discovery Channel's reality television show Oddities. The episode titled A Gurney for Grandpa focuses on the television show's stars Mike Zohn and Evan Michelson as they locate an antique gurney for the play to match the miniature one von Buhler used in her crime scene diorama.

=== Film ===
Of Dolls and Murder, directed by Susan Marks and narrated by John Waters, is a documentary about Frances Glessner Lee's crime scene investigation dollhouse dioramas. Marks is currently working on an Of Dolls and Murder sequel about Speakeasy Dollhouse.

=== Music ===
On June 4, 2012, Neil Gaiman and Amanda Palmer sang a rendition of Makin' Whoopee during a performance.

Songs by Amanda Palmer, Kim Boekbinder, and the Howard Fishman Quartet were featured with permission in the Speakeasy Dollhouse project launch video used during the Kickstarter campaign.

== Play Two: Speakeasy Dollhouse: The Brothers Booth ==
The Brothers Booth is based on von Buhler's investigation of the murder of Abraham Lincoln by John Wilkes Booth. Von Buhler sets out to prove that the murder occurred due to sibling rivalry between the brothers, Edwin Booth and John Wilkes Booth. The story was written by Cynthia von Buhler with additional scenes by Mat Smart. The play was directed by Wes Grantom. The play is held in Edwin Booth's former home and club, The Players (New York City).

=== Synopsis ===
At Edwin Booth's Gramercy Park statue unveiling a tattooed man brings an uninvited guest, the John Wilkes Booth mummy. Angry ghosts appear. Did John Wilkes Booth shoot Abraham Lincoln because of the outcome of the Civil War, or was the killer tortured by an intense sibling rivalry? Brothers Edwin and John Wilkes Booth both wanted to wear their famous father Junius Brutus Booth's thespian mantle. John Wilkes, the favorite son, was kept in school by his parents in the hopes that he'd chose a worthier professional than acting. Meanwhile, Edwin's childhood was spent being valet to his crazed, alcoholic genius of a father. This situation trained Edwin to become a talented, hard-working star who deeply understood the nuances of Shakespeare, while the younger brother grew into an impatient, fame-seeking dreamer.

=== Immersive location ===
The Brothers Booth is staged in Edwin Booth's former Gramercy Park mansion, The Players (New York City). Unlike plays presented in a traditional proscenium, the site-specific set design invites the audience to walk freely throughout various rooms of the venue. There is a speakeasy room, private alleyway, parlor, billiard room, seance room, stairway, bar, library, Mark Twain's gambling room, The John Singer Sargent room, VIP room, and Edwin Booth's bedroom. The audience is encouraged to dress in Roaring Twenties period attire. Upon arrival, each person receives a slip of paper assigning them a unique character to play.

Speakeasy Dollhouse: The Brothers Booth
- Written by: Cynthia Von Buhler with additional scenes by Mat Smart
- Characters: Edwin Booth; John Wilkes Booth; Junius Brutus Booth; John Drew Jr.; Guy Nichols; John Singer Sargent; Henry Jones; Mark Twain; Edwina Booth Grossman; Young Edwin Booth; Young John Wilkes Booth
- Genre: Immersive Theater,
- Setting: Speakeasy club, parlor, seance room, Sargent room, bedroom, stairwell, gambling room, tap room, library, alley, Gramercy Park, and street scene in New York City, 1919.

Premiere
- Date: March 2014
- Place: New York City
- Directed by: Wes Grantom
- Official website

=== Characters ===
- Edwin Booth (Eric Gravez): The ghost of the celebrated Shakespearean actor and brother of John Wilkes Booth.
- John Wilkes Booth: (Ryan Wesen): The ghost of the murderer of Abraham Lincoln and brother of Edwin Booth.
- Junius Brutus Booth: The ghost of the celebrated Shakespearean actor and father of Edwin Booth and John Wilkes Booth.
- John Drew Jr. (Russell Farhang): The celebrated Shakespearean actor and president of The Players Club in 1919.
- Guy Nichols (Chris Fink): The Players Club librarian in 1919 and a former Shakespearean actor.
- John Singer Sargent (E. James Ford): A celebrated painter.
- Henry Jones (Dan Olsen): A tattooed man from the circus.
- Mark Twain (Scott Southard): The ghost of the celebrated author and one of the founders of The Players Club.
- William Hope: A spiritualist and photographer. (Paul Duncan).
- Edwina Booth Grossman: The daughter of Edwin Booth.
- Opal Jones (Chrissy Bansham): A spiritualist and circus performer.
- Annabelle Rose(Hannah Rose): A Southern taxi dancer.
- Fanny Williams: A taxi dancer.
- Jenny St. James: A taxi dancer.
- Annie Jameston: An Irish taxi dancer.
- Lorna Larue: A taxi dancer.
- Clara Thomas: A taxi dancer.
- Violet Jones (Katelan Foisy): A tarot reader.
- Young Edwin Booth(Jonas Barranca): The young ghost of the celebrated Shakespearean actor and brother of John Wilkes Booth.
- Young John Wilkes Booth(Skyler Gallun): The young ghost of the murderer of Abraham Lincoln and brother of Edwin Booth.
- Tansy Tandori: The speakeasy hostess and burlesque dancer.
- Silent James: A silent performer and artist.
- Puppeteers (Erin Orr, Stacee Mandeville)
- Grandpa Musseleman and His Syncopators: The speakeasy band.

== Play Three: Speakeasy Dollhouse: Ziegfeld's Midnight Frolic ==
Ziegfeld's Midnight Frolic is based on von Buhler's investigation of the poisoning death of Olive Thomas, wife of Jack Pickford. Was her death an accident, a murder, or a suicide? The story was written and directed by Cynthia von Buhler. The associate director is Chris Fink and the Directorial Consultant is Alison Wright, a starring actor in The Americans. Dance is choreographed by Delysia La Chatte. The play is held in The Liberty Theater.

=== Synopsis ===
The Midnight Frolic is an immersive theater production based on Florenz Ziegfeld Jr.'s 1920s revue of the same name. Set across an expansive performance space, the show features music, dance, burlesque, and aerial acts. The production incorporates multiple narrative pathways, including a staging of Paris's Cabaret du Néant and a dramatization of the 1920 death of Ziegfeld Follies star Olive Thomas at the Hotel Ritz in Paris.

=== Olive Thomas's ghost ===
Olive Thomas's ghost is said to haunt The New Amsterdam Theater which is located next door to The Liberty Theater. According to theater personnel, her ghost appears and walks through the 41st street wall. The Liberty Theater is on the other side of the wall.

=== Immersive location ===
Ziegfeld's Midnight Frolic is staged in The Liberty Theater in Times Square. Unlike plays presented in a traditional proscenium, the site-specific set design invites the audience to walk freely throughout various rooms of the venue. There is a follies theater, Montmartre alleyway, The Cabaret of Nothingness, The Ritz Hotel in Paris, Ziegfeld's office, and Alberto Vargas' art reception. The audience is encouraged to dress in Roaring Twenties period attire. Upon arrival, each person receives a slip of paper assigning them a unique character to play.

Speakeasy Dollhouse: Ziegfeld's Midnight Frolic
- Written by: Cynthia Von Buhler
- Characters: Olive Thomas; Jack Pickford; Florenz Ziegfeld; Fanny Brice; Josephine Baker; Eddie Cantor; Billie Burke; Alberto Vargas; Will Rogers; Mister Gallagher; Mister Shean; Mary Eaton; Dorothy Mackaill; Bee Palmer; Helen Gallagher
- Genre: Immersive Theater,
- Setting: Broadway theater, Paris cabaret, Paris hotel room, office, art reception balcony, Times Square back door entrance, and an alley scene in Montmartre Paris, 1920.

Premiere
- Date: April 2015
- Place: New York City
- Official website

== Bibliography ==
- Elisabeth Vincentelli (May 28, 2012). "Taking theater off the stage and into the streets, hotels and onto an island". NYPOST.com.
- Leah Taylor, Flavorpill. "Speakeasy Dollhouse - Flavorpill New York". Flavorpill.com.
- on Apr 09, 2012 (April 9, 2012). "Speakeasy Dollhouse" Solves 100-Year-Old Murder Mystery". Bust.com.
- "Cynthia Von Buhler Tells Us About Recreating Her Grandfather's Murder In The Bronx". Gothamist.com. September 8, 2011. Archived from the original on October 27, 2013.
- James Barron (June 7, 2012). "Using a Dollhouse to Reconstruct a Murder, 77 Years Later". The New York Times.
