= List of New Hampshire historical markers (251–275) =

- «226–250 276–300

This page is one of a series of pages that list New Hampshire historical markers. The text of each marker is provided within its entry.

Contents
No.	Title	Location	Coordinates
251	Dr. Jennie Sarah Barney (1861–1956)	Grafton	43.56142092°N 71.94979875°W
252	Bungtown	Grafton	43.5677°N 71.9262°W
253	Londonderry Turnpike	Salem	42.80084°N 71.24195°W
254	'The Avenues' Neighborhood	Berlin	44.47369701°N 71.18718155°W
255	The City That Trees Built	Berlin	44.46967831°N 71.18571328°W
256	Gerrish Depot	Boscawen	43.36552°N 71.65049°W
257	Frances Glessner Lee (1878–1962) 'Mother of Forensic Science'	Bethlehem	44.28388°N 71.73528°W
258	Webster Stagecoach Stop and Store	Danville	42.95088627°N 71.11697619°W
259	Nottingham Square	Nottingham	43.1033°N 71.11024°W
260	Captain Peter Powers Homestead Site	Hollis	42.74277°N 71.59424°W
261	BASIC: The First User-Friendly Computer Programming Language	Hanover	43.68849°N 72.26914°W
262	Charles E. Tilton's Legacy	Tilton	43.44311°N 71.59471°W
263	Franconia College 1963–1978	Franconia	44.226793°N 71.729603°W
264	Home of John Parker Hale, 1840–1873	Dover	43.18982344°N 70.8741958°W
265	Cornish Meetinghouse	Cornish	43.49878268°N 72.27946245°W
266	Pinkerton Academy / Old Academy Building	Derry	42.89590006°N 71.31461733°W
267	Abbot-Spalding House	Nashua	42.76590483°N 71.46844512°W
268	Bernice Blake Perry (1905–1996)	Milford	42.83494466°N 71.65132341°W
269	E. Maude Ferguson, New Hampshire’s First Woman State Senator	Bristol	43.35274°N 71.44931°W
270	Miller State Park, New Hampshire's First State Park	Peterborough	42.86205232°N 71.87859°W
271	Fresh Pond Ice Company	Brookline	42.73958°N 71.668692°W
272	Hilton Family of Newfields	Newfields	43.03435876°N 70.94301358°W
273	Chain Link Fence Innovation	Raymond	43.03957°N 71.16458°W
274	Beecher's Pulpit	Carroll	44.27334358°N 71.54001914°W
275	Sarah Whitcher and the Bear	Warren	43.97610016°N 71.89205308°W
Notes • References • External links

== Markers 251 to 275 ==
=== 251. Dr. Jennie Sarah Barney (1861–1956) ===
Town of Grafton

Location: Intersection of U.S. Route 4 and Prescott Hill Road

"Born to a prominent family in Grafton, J. Sarah Barney graduated valedictorian from Boston University with degrees in medicine and surgery in 1896. A founding doctor at Franklin Hospital, where she practiced from 1910 to her retirement, Dr. Barney was remembered for her grit, humor, and involvement with women's suffrage. Upon her death, newspapers called her a pioneer and urged young readers to 'gather a little inspiration from the life of Dr. Barney to face up to the problem of the hour.' "

=== 252. Bungtown ===
Town of Grafton

Location: Turnpike Road off of U.S. Route 4

"In the 19th century this industrial village developed between the Grafton Turnpike (Note: See also List of turnpikes in New Hampshire.) and the banks of Mill Brook. East Grafton was once known as Bungtown, a name derived from an accident involving an overturned cart of failed barrel stoppers or 'bungs.' At peak production, one could find shingles, clapboards, cider, harnesses, axes, paint, woolens, bobbins, carriages, and coffins made here, powered by several mill ponds. Today, the carding mill, axe factory, and harness shop still stand."

=== 253. Londonderry Turnpike ===
Town of Salem

Location: Old Rockingham Road

"Incorporated in 1804, this major highway completed the link between Concord, NH and Boston, MA, (Note: See also List of turnpikes in New Hampshire.) improving transportation of goods and personal travel. Granite posts marked many turnpikes, and this one in Salem marked the halfway point between Concord and Boston. The mileposts aided travelers and road maintenance crews. The marker was cemented into the stone wall in the 1940s after road repair. In 1956 the land was donated to the town to preserve memory of the original main route through Salem, NH on Old Rockingham Rd."

Note: Originally installed in 2016 at 43 Old Rockingham Road in Salem, in 2022 the marker was relocated to 73 Old Rockingham Road.

=== 254. 'The Avenues' Neighborhood ===
City of Berlin

Location: Intersection of NH 110 and Hinchey Street (Note: This marker is visible on Google Street View at the intersection of NH 110 and Third Avenue, not Hinchey Street (which does not intersect NH 110).)

"'The Avenues,' a large neighborhood with small lots, was named for its north-south avenues, 1st to 6th. Housing construction was fueled by the booming paper industry and the arrival of the Berlin Street Railway in 1902. Over the next 30 years, many working-class immigrant families built single and multi-family houses in this ethnically-diverse neighborhood, which included many French-Canadian families, as well as those from Russia, Poland, Ireland, and Italy."

=== 255. The City That Trees Built ===
City of Berlin

Location: Intersection of NH 110 and Green Street (Note: This marker is visible on Google Street View at the intersection of NH 110 and Gilbert Street, not Green Street.)

"Berlin became known as 'The City that Trees Built' after innovations in the 1870s replaced rags with wood pulp in paper manufacturing. As the paper industry expanded Berlin's population grew from 8,886 in 1900 to 20,018 in 1930. The Brown Company research laboratory, associated with a prominent mill company, held some 500 patents. While pulp, newsprint, and kraft shipping paper were major products, Brown Company manufactured many other wood-based items including chloroform, Kream Krisp shortening, Nibroc paper towels, and Bermico sewer pipes."

=== 256. Gerrish Depot ===
Town of Boscawen

Location: U.S. Route 3 at Gerrish Depot

"Constructed in 1855 to replace the original station, this is the oldest surviving depot on the former Northern Railroad. First known as 'North Boscawen Depot,' it was renamed in 1909 following a fatal train collision caused by confusion over similar station names, along with several other depots on the line. The name 'Gerrish' was chosen in honor of a prominent farming family. The depot provided freight and passenger service for local farms and residents, the state nursery, the county nursing home, and county jail until 1955."

=== 257. Frances Glessner Lee (1878–1962) 'Mother of Forensic Science' ===
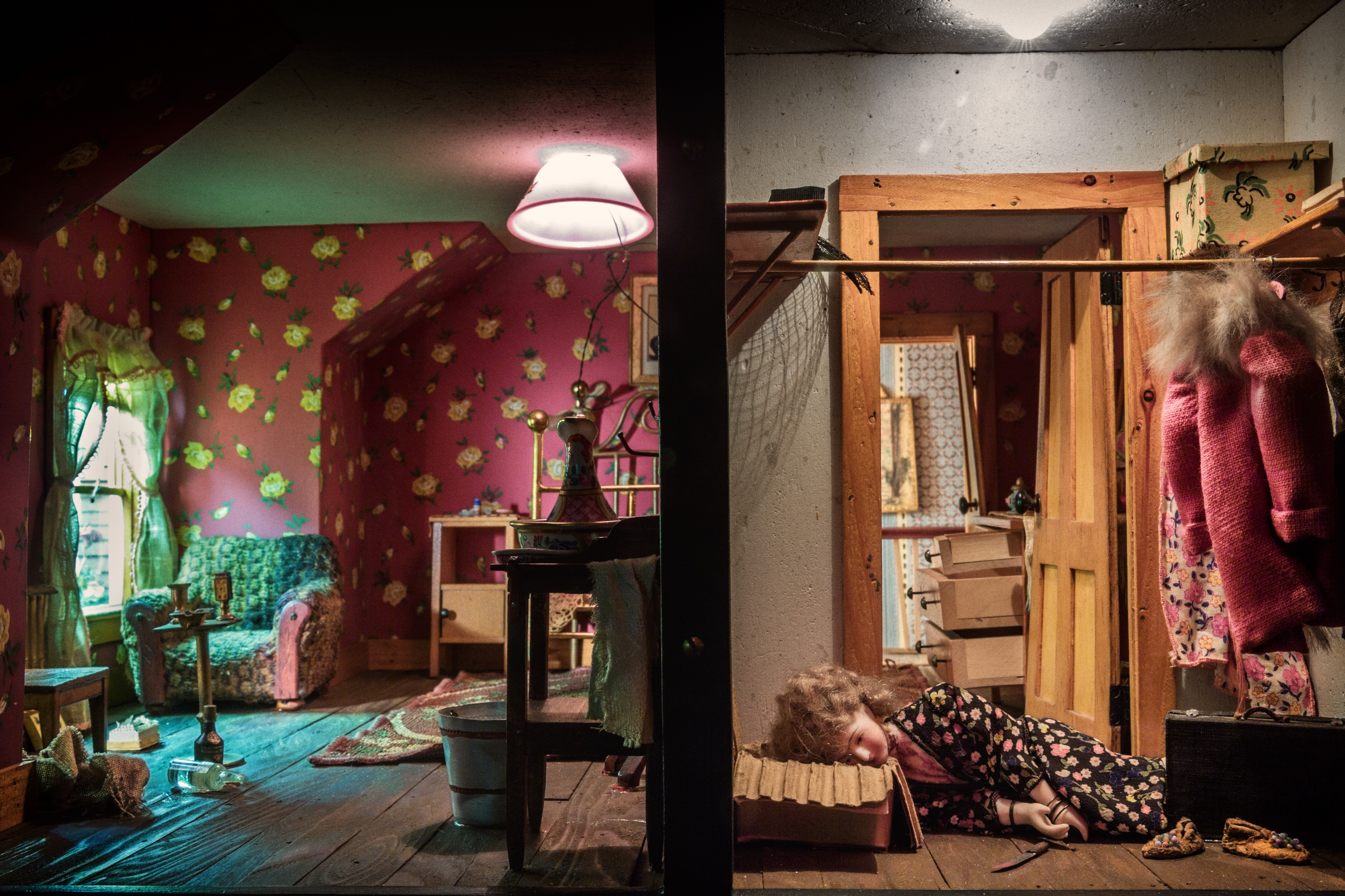
One of the Nutshell Studies of Unexplained Death by Frances Glessner Lee

Town of Bethlehem

Location: U.S. Route 302 at Glessner Road

"Here at the Rocks, her family's summer estate, this Chicago heiress pursued her passion for criminology in the 1940s–50s with the creation of 20 miniature dioramas depicting actual crime scenes with detailed accuracy. Called the Nutshell Studies of Unexplained Death, the dioramas were based on crime scene statements and photographs, and were used to train homicide detectives. In recognition of her many contributions to forensic science, Glessner Lee was appointed an honorary Captain of the New Hampshire State Police in 1943."

=== 258. Webster Stagecoach Stop and Store ===
Town of Danville

Location: NH 111A and Sandown Road

"This small building, built ca. 1820, served as a stopover for a stagecoach route that passed through Danville. Passengers could buy refreshments while the horses rested and carriages were repaired. Early customer accounts remain intact, written on interior walls. Nathaniel Webster, third cousin to Daniel Webster and the town's first U.S. postmaster, ran the post office from this building. The stagecoach stop's history illustrates the importance of 19th century stagecoach culture, not only for travel but also for commerce and mail delivery."

=== 259. Nottingham Square ===
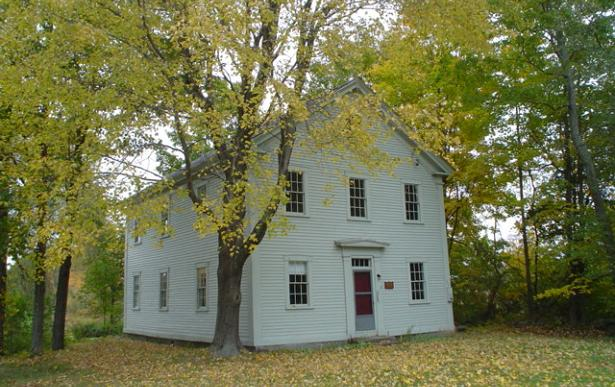
Square Schoolhouse, located in Nottingham Square

Town of Nottingham

Location: Nottingham Square on NH 156

"The Town of Nottingham was created by a Royal Charter in 1722. A plan of the town was completed in 1724; at that time the design of the Nottingham Square was laid out with the house lots and the intersecting streets of Bow, Fish, King and North. The town's first school, blockhouse and later meetinghouse were built on this summit. The site of militia drills in 1775 and home to four Revolutionary War generals, Nottingham Square served as the center of the town's business and social life for more than a century and remains common land for all."

=== 260. Captain Peter Powers Homestead Site ===
Town of Hollis

Location: NH 130 West

"Hollis's first settlers of English descent, Capt. Peter Powers and his wife, Anna Keyes, established their homestead on this hill in 1730. An explorer, land surveyor and town officer, Capt. Powers also led the Hollis Company in the 1755 expedition to Crown Point, New York, during the French and Indian War. He and three sons served in the French and Indian War; four sons were soldiers in the Revolutionary War as well. Capt. Powers died of fever in 1757 at age 49, while Anna remained in Hollis until her death in 1798."

=== 261. BASIC: The First User-Friendly Computer Programming Language ===
Town of Hanover

Location: NH 120

"In 1964, Dartmouth College math professors John Kemeny and Thomas Kurtz created one of the first user-friendly programming languages, called Beginners All-purpose Symbolic Instruction Code. BASIC made computer programming accessible to college students and, with the later popularity of personal computers, to users everywhere. It became the standard way that people all over the world learned to program computers, and variants of BASIC are still in use today."

=== 262. Charles E. Tilton's Legacy ===
Town of Tilton

Location: Near Riverfront Park at U.S. Route 3

"Native Charles E. Tilton shaped his hometown through many gifts of monuments, buildings and parks—places that make the community special today. After moving to the West Coast in 1850, Tilton acquired extraordinary wealth through his trading company and investments. The citizens of Sanbornton Bridge voted to name their new town 'Tilton' in his family's honor after NH Governor Onslow Stearns approved the town's division from Sanbornton June 30, 1869."

=== 263. Franconia College 1963–1978 ===
Town of Franconia

Location: NH 142

"In 1963, an emerging Franconia College purchased the former Forest Hills grand hotel, built on this site in 1882. Bending the norms of higher education, the college offered selfdirected study, and administrative decisions were made by faculty and students at freewheeling community meetings. The experimental school was part of a national trend in progressive education during an era of revolution and change. Faced with mounting financial pressures, it closed its doors in 1978. By 1986 the building was no longer extant."

=== 264. Home of John Parker Hale, 1840–1873 ===
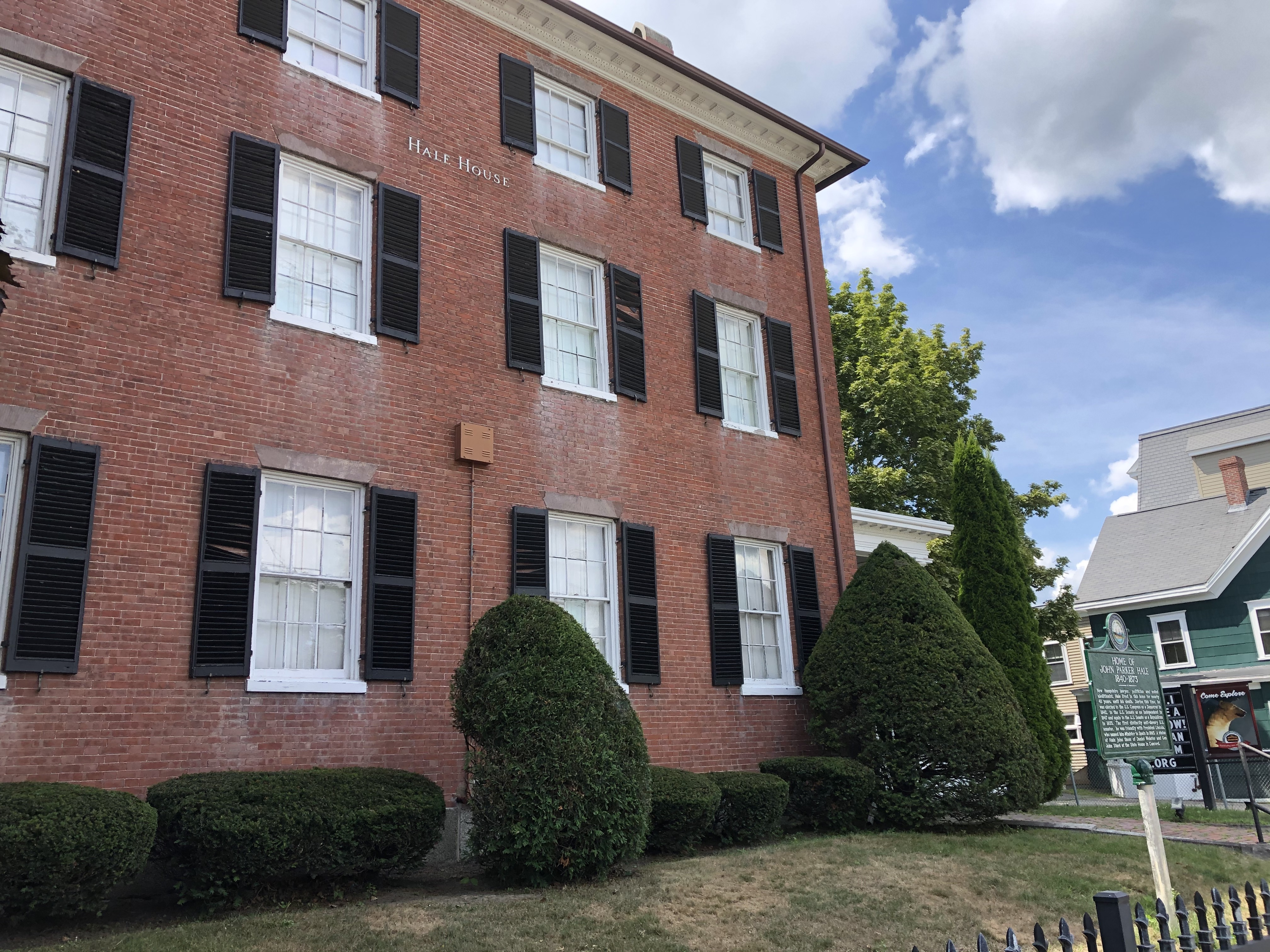
The home of John P. Hale, now part of the Woodman Institute Museum, with historical marker at right

City of Dover

Location: NH 108 (Central Avenue)

"New Hampshire lawyer, politician and noted abolitionist, Hale lived in this home for nearly 40 years, until his death. During this time, he was elected to the U.S. Congress as a Democrat in 1842, to the U.S. Senate as an Independent in 1847 and again to the U.S. Senate as a Republican in 1855. The first distinctly anti-slavery U.S. senator, he was friendly with President Lincoln, who named him Minister to Spain in 1865. A statue of Hale joins those of Daniel Webster and Gen. John Stark at the State House in Concord."

=== 265. Cornish Meetinghouse ===
Town of Cornish

Location: Meetinghouse Road @ Cornish Stage Road

"Built in 1803 as the First Baptist Church in the geographic center of town, the Cornish Meetinghouse was moved to the more populated mill and mercantile village of Cornish Flat in 1818. After its move, the belfry was added. Charlestown clockmaker Stephen Hasham's hand wound clock, installed in 1845, still keeps time and strikes the bell that was replaced in 1872. In 1883 the belfry was enclosed and a patterned slate roof was added. The building's exterior reflects architectural details from the Federal, Greek Revival and Queen Anne periods."

=== 266. Pinkerton Academy / Old Academy Building ===
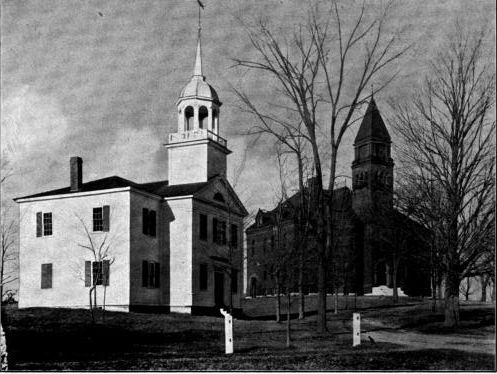
Old Academy Building, at left, on the grounds of Pinkerton Academy in Derry

Town of Derry

Location: NH 28 Bypass (North Main Street)

"Incorporated in 1814, Pinkerton Academy is the state's largest independent high school and is one of the oldest. Since its founding 'for the purpose of promoting piety and virtue and for the Education of Youth,' notable faculty and alumni include: poet and Pinkerton teacher Robert Frost (1906–11); Alan Shepard (1940), the first American in space; Brian Thacker (1963), who earned the Medal of Honor for his action in the Vietnam War; and Tricia Dunn (1992), who won a gold medal for ice hockey at the 1998 Winter Olympics."

"Southwest of this marker stands Pinkerton Academy's first schoolhouse. It was built in 1815 through efforts of trustees John Porter and brothers John and James Pinkerton. The building opened its doors on Dec. 4, 1815 and, by June 1816, Pinkerton's enrollment consisted of 44 boys and 27 girls from N.H. and surrounding states. Moved from its original site in 1886, the Old Academy Building survives as Pinkerton's only original structure. It has served many functions, such as the home of the Alumni Association and the school's archives."

=== 267. Abbot-Spalding House ===
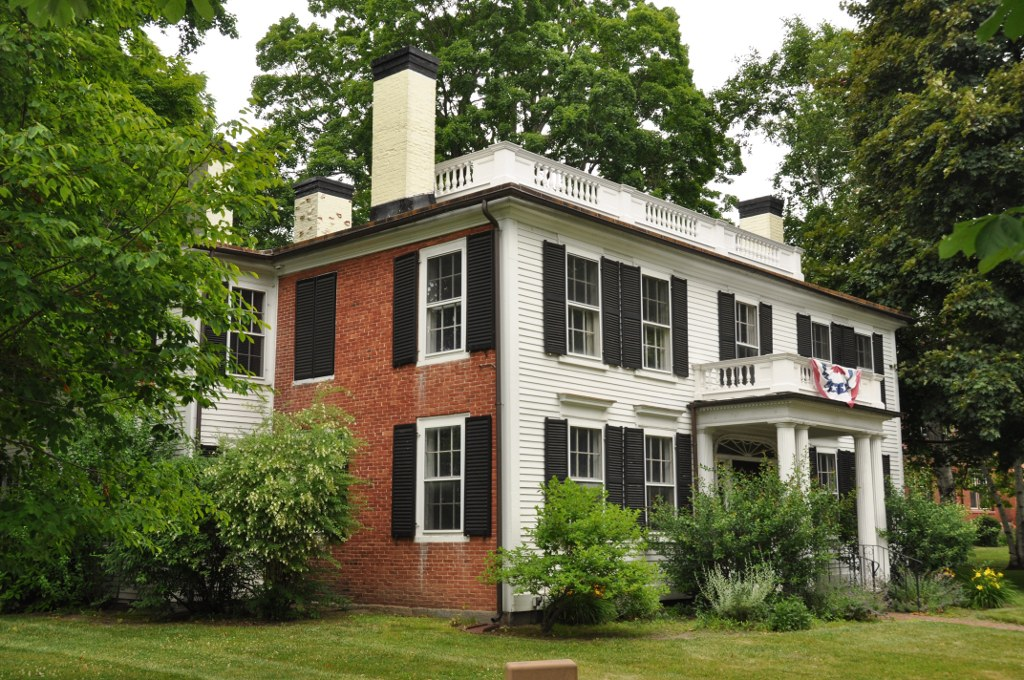
Abbot-Spalding House in Nashua

City of Nashua

Location: 1 Abbot Street @ NH 101A

"Built in 1803–1804, the Abbot-Spalding House exemplifies the Federal and Colonial Revival styles of architecture in Nashua, with the interior featuring fine woodwork and cabinetry. Daniel Abbot, the 'Father of Nashua,' and his family were the original residents. William Spalding, a noted banker and antique dealer, and his family were the last residents. Spalding and his cabinetmaker son, Dexter, updated the residence with Colonial Revival detailing in the early 20th century. The house was acquired by the Nashua Historical Society in 1978."

=== 268. Bernice Blake Perry (1905–1996) ===
Town of Milford

Location: Centennial Park (NH 101A at Union Street)

"In 1929, Manchester native Bernice Blake Perry became the first woman in New Hampshire to pilot a plane and the first female commercial pilot in New England. She spent her adult life in Milford and was a charter member of the Ninety-Nines, a pioneering group of female pilots led by Amelia Earhart. Perry became known in the 1930s for her aerial photography, including site mapping to help develop airports in New Hampshire. A member of the Blake’s Restaurant family, she was also a well-known philanthropist in the region."

=== 269. E. Maude Ferguson, New Hampshire’s First Woman State Senator ===
Town of Bristol

Location: Bristol Town Square

"A resident of Bristol, E. Maude Ferguson was widely admired for her community service. A member of the League of Women Voters, she won election to the NH House of Representatives six years after women secured the vote. In 1930, after two terms in the House, she became the first woman elected to the NH State Senate, having been endorsed by both Republicans and Democrats. A trained elocutionist, she served on the Judiciary Committee and chaired the State Library Committee during her terms in Concord."

=== 270. Miller State Park, New Hampshire's First State Park ===
Town of Peterborough

Location: Summit parking lot

"A gift of three acres atop Pack Monadnock in 1891 for use as a 'park or pleasure-ground,' Miller State Park has grown to more than 530 acres. 'Pack,' an ancient Abenaki word meaning 'small,' contrasts its summit with nearby Mount Monadnock. The site has included a 'mountain highway,' two different hotels that each succumbed to fire, and a fire look-out tower built by the Civilian Conservation Corps in the 1930s. The park is named for Peterborough native Gen. James Miller."

=== 271. Fresh Pond Ice Company ===
Town of Brookline

Location: NH 13

"Beginning in 1890, Fresh Pond Ice Company operated on the eastern shore of Lake Potanipo. (Note: Fresh Pond Ice Company was named after its original location, Fresh Pond in Cambridge, Massachusetts.) The first ice harvest was shipped to Boston for local distribution in 1892 on Brookline’s newly complete railroad. At its peak of operation, the company employed more than 250 people and harvested more than 100,000 tons of ice annually in 13 icehouses. The advent of electric refrigeration, coupled with a fire that destroyed the extensive complex of icehouses on March 22, 1935, (Note: A report of this fire in The Portsmouth Herald noted that six buildings were destroyed.) effectively ended commercial ice harvesting at this location."

=== 272. Hilton Family of Newfields ===
Town of Newfields

Location: NH 85 @ Summer Street

"After establishing a fishing settlement in what is now called Dover Point, Edward Hilton, Sr. (1569–1671) settled in the 'New fields' section of Exeter in the 1630s. Hilton’s first know residence was located near the Hilton Burying Ground, where many of his descendants are buried. The oldest surviving inscription is for his grandson, Col. Winthrop Hilton (1671–1710), who was the principal military commander in New Hampshire at the time of his death. A Hilton family home built in the early 18th century stands on what is now Exeter Road."

=== 273. Chain Link Fence Innovation ===
Town of Raymond

Location: Northwest corner of NH 156 junction with NH 27

"In 1930, while living in Raymond, Frank J. Mafera patented a method of forming wire fence fabric that was appealing for residential use as it was safer and more attractive, yet still strong. Prior to this innovation, chain link fencing was woven in a way that left ‘ragged or unsightly’ twists or barbs. Mafera’s technique produced a closed, rounded configuration that is still used in the manufacturing of some chain link fencing. This fence style was first sold at Mafera’s Barnyard Fence Company in Raymond, which later became the New Hampshire Fence Company."

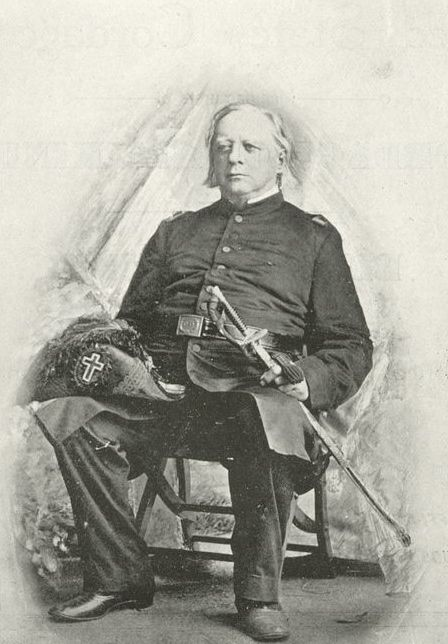
Henry Ward Beecher, circa 1878

=== 274. Beecher's Pulpit ===
Town of Carroll

Location: Intersection of U.S. Route 3 and Fieldstone Lane

"A glacial boulder overlooking Twin Mountain Village, known as 'Beecher's Pulpit,' since the 1870s is named for the Rev. Henry Ward Beecher. A Congregationalist clergyman, abolitionist, proponent of women’s suffrage and brother to author Harriet Beecher Stowe, he came to the White Mountains to escape seasonal allergies. While a guest at the Twin Mountain House, located near this site, Beecher conducted sermons that sometimes drew crowds over 1,000."

Twin Mountain House, White Mountains, New Hampshire, 1923

=== 275. Sarah Whitcher and the Bear ===
Town of Warren

Location: Southwest corner of Swain Hill Road junction with NH 25

"Three-year-old Sarah Whitcher became lost in these woods in June 1783 while gathering flowers. During a four-day search, Sarah’s footprints were found near Berry Brook alongside bear prints. A local man joined the search after dreaming three times that 'Sarah would be found under a pine bough near Berry Brook guarded by a bear.' His dream proved to be true: Sarah was found as he stated and she told her rescuers that 'A great black dog had kept her each night.' The lore of this little girl saved by a bear has entertained generations of people and inspired several children’s books."

Note: this marker was erected in 2022.
