= Intruder Alert =

Intruder Alert may refer to:

== Music ==
- "Intruder Alert", a 2003 song by Combichrist on the compilation album Noise Collection Vol. 1
- "Intruder Alert", a 2007 song by Lupe Fiasco from the album Lupe Fiasco's The Cool
- "Intruder Alert", a 2000 song by Sauce Money from the album Middle Finger U
- "Intruder Alert", a 2019 instrumental produced by Ron Ethan Yohann from the soundtrack of Game Over (2019 film)
- "Intruder Alert / Preparing the Weapon", a 2019 instrumental by Joel McNeely from the soundtrack of The Orville season 1

== Television ==
- "Intruder Alert", a 2022 episode of Cops
- "Intruder Alert", a 2017 episode of Moonshiners
- "Intruder Alert!", a 2020 episode of Power Rangers Beast Morphers
- "Intruder Alert", a feature of some seasons of Big Brother (Australian TV series)
- "Intruder Alert", a skit from Where in Time Is Carmen Sandiego? (game show)

== Web series ==
- "Intruder Alert" (Battle for Dream Island), a 2023 web series episode
- "intruder alert", a 2021 episode of The Mandela Catalogue
- "Intruder Alert", a 2007 trailer associated with the book Encyclopedia Horrifica

== Other uses ==
- Intruder Alert!, a 1981 Atari 8-bit computer game by Dynacomp

== See also ==
- Berzerk (video game), a 1980 video game associated with the phrase
- Alarm
- Security alarm
- Spaceguard
