= Cynthia von Buhler =

American artist and writer

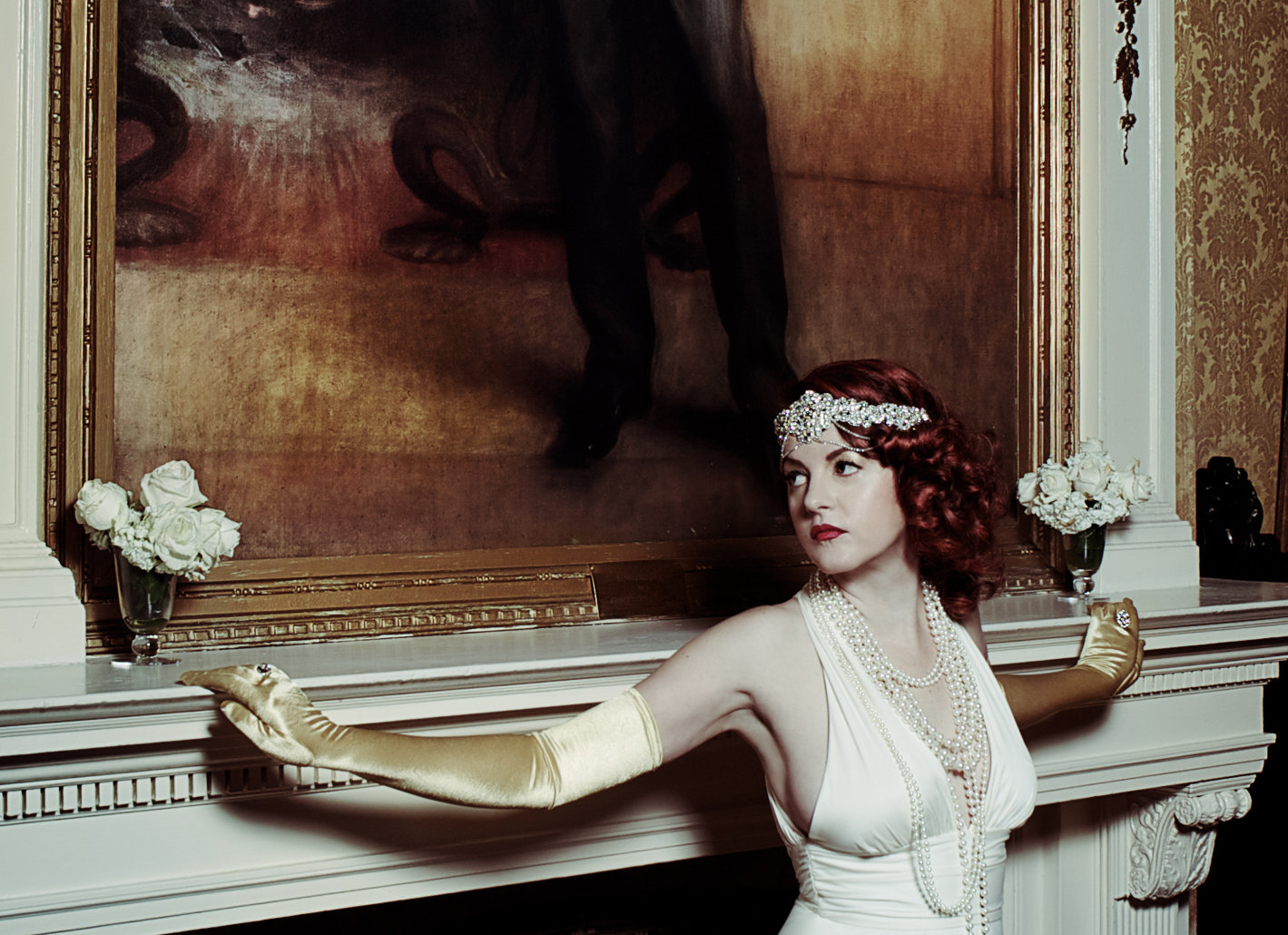
- Born: Cynthia Carrozza
- Education: The Art Institute of Boston; Richmond College
- Movement: Surrealist, Magic Realism, Fluxus

Cynthia von Buhler (/ˈbjuːlər/; born Cynthia Carrozza,) is an American artist, author, playwright, performer, and producer.

== Early life ==
Cynthia von Buhler was born Cynthia Carrozza and raised in the Berkshires of Massachusetts, the middle child in an artistic family with six children. Of her childhood, she says "As soon as we could hold a scissor, we learned every kind of craft imaginable, and worked in three dimensions, not just two." Creative from the start, she created large-scale papier-mâché floats for her hometown Halloween parades, and won her first art award while she was still in grammar school. Growing up in the Berkshires, surrounded by world-class theater, von Buhler staged, performed and sang in plays at school and camp. Her high school graduation was held at Tanglewood in Lenox, Massachusetts.

Von Buhler studied art and children's books at The Art Institute of Boston. After graduating she continued her studies at Richmond, The American International University in London.

=== Royalty connection ===
Von Buhler claims her family is rumored to descend from the royal Italian Sforza family through an illegitimate child. This Sforza line was given the title of "Count" by the Pope to give them legitimacy. An Italian diplomat and anti-Fascist politician of this line is Count Carlo Sforza. In a manifesto von Buhler wrote in 2001 she explains why she has a title. "My grandmother's maiden name is Sforza, and the rumor in the family is that we are related to the infamous Francesco Sforza of Milan, known for treachery, hiring Leonardo da Vinci as his plumber, beautiful mistresses, and a delicious Italian nougat candy called Torrone." A friend began referring to the gothic Victorian house as Castle von Buhler and the name stuck—the press dubbed the artist Countess Cynthia von Buhler.

== Immersive theater ==
Speakeasy Dollhouse by von Buhler is a true tale of New York City Prohibition-era bootlegging, mafia, infidelity, and murder. Von Buhler had been haunted by a shocking family mystery for years. Her grandparents Frank and Mary Spano owned two speakeasies in the Bronx during Prohibition: one that masqueraded as a bakery, the other a secret nightclub. Shortly after Prohibition ended, her grandfather was shot and killed on the street in Manhattan. Her grandmother was pregnant with her mother at the time, and upon hearing the news of the murder she went into labor. Von Buhler's grandfather's body was laid out in one room of their small Bronx apartment while her mother was born in the room next to it. "Nobody still living in my family knows why my grandfather was shot. Nothing was known about the killer, his motive, or a trial. My grandmother took these secrets to her grave. And so, over the past two years, I have been dusting off a complicated, historically significant story," explains von Buhler. To more thoroughly explore her grandfather's murder and events leading up to it, von Buhler created an elaborate speakeasy dollhouse set complete with handmade dolls in her art studio. The set includes a plush secret nightclub, a bakery, a pre-war apartment, a bootlegging bathroom, a morgue, and even Ellis Island. The set contains crime scene details that can be examined from every angle. Von Buhler was featured in the "Gurney For Grandpa" episode of Oddities discussing this project.

Taking it one step further, the artist created an immersive theatrical experience to go along with the sets and her own investigation. Speakeasy Dollhouse stages these events in a historic Lower East Side speakeasy elaborately set up to mirror the dollhouse sets. The actors aren't visually distinguished from the audience, making the audience as key to the show as the performers. The play's tagline is "The speakeasy is my dollhouse and you are my dolls." A limited-edition graphic novel book, The Bloody Beginning, and initial performances in 2011 were paid through Kickstarter, a crowdfunding site. The play will continue into 2015 with tickets available to the general public. Of Dolls and Murder, directed by Susan Marks and narrated by John Waters, is a documentary about Francis Glessner Lee's crime scene investigation dollhouse dioramas. Marks created an Of Dolls and Murder sequel based on Speakeasy Dollhouse.

Speakeasy Dollhouse became the brand name for all of Cynthia von Buhler's immersive theater productions. The original show was renamed The Bloody Beginning.

=== Immersive theater productions ===
- October 2017 – February 2018, The Illuminati Ball, Weylin formerly Williamsburgh Savings Bank, Brooklyn, NY
- March 2016 – August 2018, The Illuminati Ball, An Immersive Excursion, A Secret Estate, NY, NY
- September 2018 – November 2018, The Girl Who Handcuffed Houdini, Theatre 80, NY, NY
- June 2016 – August 2016, The Bloody Beginning, Weylin, Brooklyn, NY
- March 2015 – November 2015, Ziegfeld Midnight Frolic, Liberty Theater, NY, NY
- March 2014 – April 2014, The Brothers Booth, The Players, NY, NY
- March 2011 – April 2015, The Bloody Beginning, The Back Room, NY, NY

== Graphic novels ==
The Girl Who Handcuffed Houdini follows private investigator Minky Woodcock as she uncovers secrets surrounding the final days of the world-famous escape artist, Harry Houdini. Woodcock's investigation leads her to cross paths with Sir Arthur Conan Doyle, who believes Houdini is not merely a magician but has supernatural powers, and Bess Houdini, who suspects her husband is cheating on her. Von Buhler investigated the death of Houdini and based her story on true crime evidence.

In The Girl Who Electrified Tesla, Minky Woodcock is hired to investigate whether the inventor Nicola Tesla has developed a death ray.

The third in the Minky Woodcock series, The Girl Called Cthulhu, begins with the detective trying to exonerate the occultist Aleister Crowley after he's accused of murder, in a tale that involves HP Lovecraft and Ian Fleming.

Evelyn Evelyn are a musical duo formed by Amanda Palmer (of The Dresden Dolls) and Jason Webley. According to the fictional backstory described by Palmer and Webley, the duo consists of conjoined twin sisters (aka "Eva" and "Lyn"), Evelyn and Evelyn Neville, who were discovered in 2007 by Palmer and Webley. The twins are actually portrayed by Palmer and Webley,[5] dressed in connected garments. Dark Horse Comics published a two book graphic novel encased in a hardcover sleeve, written by Amanda Palmer and Jason Webley and illustrated by von Buhler. The book had an afterword written by Neil Gaiman.

=== Graphic novel bibliography ===
- 2025, Minky Woodcock: The Girl Called Cthulhu written and illustrated by Cynthia von Buhler, Hard Case Crime/Titan Comics, Distributed by Random House ISBN 978-1787743298
- 2021, Minky Woodcock: The Girl Who Electrified Tesla written and illustrated by von Buhler, Hard Case Crime/Titan Comics, Distributed by Random House ISBN 978-1787730113
- 2019, The Illuminati Ball written and illustrated by von Buhler, Titan Comics, Distributed by Random House ISBN 978-1787732216
- 2018, Minky Woodcock: The Girl Who Handcuffed Houdini written and illustrated by von Buhler, Hard Case Crime/Titan Comics, Distributed by Random House ISBN 978-1785863974
- 2012, Evelyn Evelyn: A Terrible Tale in Two Tomes written by Amanda Palmer and Jason Webley, illustrated by Cynthia von Buhler, Dark Horse Comics, Distributed by Diamond Comic Distributors ISBN 978-1-59582-578-0

== Children's books ==
In 2001 von Buhler was asked by Steven Spielberg to illustrate Martha Stewart's story for Once Upon A Fairy Tale (Viking), a book produced to benefit The Starbright Foundation for seriously ill children. In 2002, New York Public Library selected the "handsomely illustrated" (The New York Times) They Called Her Molly Pitcher, written by Anne Rockwell and illustrated by von Buhler, as one of One Hundred Titles for Reading and Sharing. In 2004, von Buhler went on to illustrate Nicolaus Copernicus: The Earth is a Planet. Reviews called her "dramatic oil-on-gesso artwork" (School Library Journal) "handsome and effective" (Booklist). Publishers Weekly offered high praise for her work on the book: "Von Buhler's paintings exert a gravitational pull of their own."

In 2006 von Buhler wrote and illustrated The Cat Who Wouldn't Come Inside with dual credits as author and illustrator. The book, based on a true story, featured painted clay characters in detailed architectural sets. Book Sense named the book as a Children's Pick for Winter/Spring 2006/2007 for its "beautiful story" and "extremely detailed sets." Kirkus Reviews called the illustrations "unique" and "eye-popping," providing "a glimpse of a world beyond the frame" and pronounced the book "a sheer delight." Publishers Weekly thought "readers ... may well be entranced" by the "considerable magic" of von Buhler's illustrations, while Time Out New York called the book "beautifully ornate," and "the cat's meow." The book was also chosen as Teacher's Picks: Best of 2006 by Parent & Child magazine.

In 2009, von Buhler took a second turn as author and illustrator with But Who Will Bell The Cats?. The book's illustrations feature handmade architectural sets, cinematic lighting, and paper doll oil paintings of the characters in action. Kirkus Reviews stated that "young readers will pore over this one again and again," and School Library Journal agreed that "children will find a lot to discover in the details, even after repeated readings." The Nassau County Museum of Art in New York exhibited the book's elaborate miniature sets in a solo exhibition between September 20, 2009, and January 3, 2010. During the summer of 2010 Von Buhler exhibited the miniature sets in an animatronic window display that she created for Books of Wonder in Manhattan. Time Out Kid's did a feature article on the window along with a slideshow showing von Buhler creating it. Elizabeth Bird, a New York Public Librarian, posted a lengthy review of the book on her School Library Journal blog, "Is it wrong that I sometimes want to blow a four-year-old's mind? I've come to the decision that Cynthia von Buhler's But Who Will Bell the Cats? is going to be my library's secret weapon from here on in."

In 2024, Warner Bros. Pictures Animation picked up von Buhler's upcoming work Forestina for a potential feature film adaptation.

Von Buhler has also illustrated dozens of young adult book covers including Queen's Own Fool by Jane Yolen, The Road to Damietta by Scott O'Dell, and two Newbery Medal winners, The Bronze Bow by Elizabeth George Speare and The Perilous Guard by Elizabeth Marie Pope.

=== Children's book bibliography ===
- 2009, But Who Will Bell The Cats? written and illustrated by von Buhler, Houghton Mifflin, ISBN 0-618-99718-0
- 2006, The Cat Who Wouldn't Come Inside written and illustrated by von Buhler, Houghton Mifflin, ISBN 0-618-56314-8
- 2002 (reprinted in paperback in 2006), They Called Her Molly Pitcher, written by Anne Rockwell, illustrated by von Buhler, Knopf, ISBN 0-679-89187-0
- 2004, Nicolaus Copernicus: The Earth Is A Planet, written by Dennis Brindell Fradin, illustrated by von Buhler, Mondo Books, ISBN 1-59336-006-1
- 2001, Once Upon A Fairytale, partially written by Martha Stewart, partially illustrated by von Buhler, 21 celebrity authors, 21 award-winning illustrators, a Steven Spielberg benefit project, Viking, ISBN 0-670-03500-9
- 1998, Little Girl in Red Dress With Cat and Dog, written by Nicholas B.A. Nicholson, illustrated by von Buhler, Viking, ISBN 0-670-87183-4

=== Children's book awards and honors ===
- 2009-10, Cybil Award nomination, Fiction Picture Book, But Who Will Bell the Cats?
- 2006 Teacher's Picks: Best of 2006, Parent & Child," The Cat Who Wouldn't Come Inside
- 2006/07 Children's Pick for Winter/Spring 2006/2007, Book Sense, The Cat Who Wouldn't Come Inside
- 2002One Hundred Titles for Reading and Sharing,They Called Her Molly Pitcher, The New York Public Library
- 1998 Exceptional Book of the Year, Little Girl in a Red Dress with Cat and Dog, Bookman Review Syndicate.

== Fine art ==
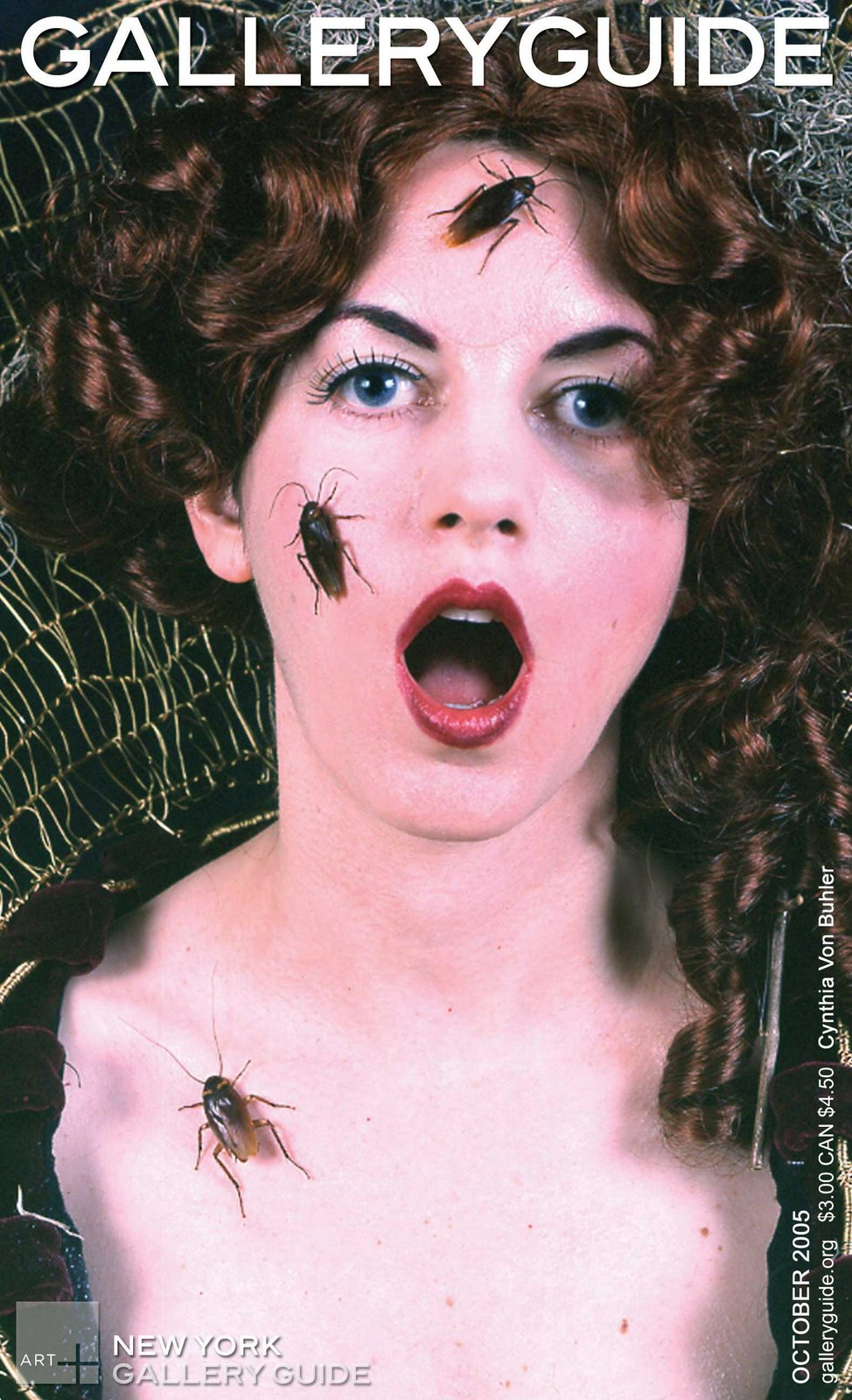
Cynthia von Buhler on the cover of New York's Gallery Guide

In August 2001 she held an event at Castle von Buhler dubbed "The Great Purge" where she sold off most of her possessions. Von Buhler separated from Adam Buhler and moved to New York City's Meatpacking District. Farewell articles were published in The Boston Globe, The Improper Bostonian and The Boston Phoenix citing her as producing "some of the most sensuous, humorous, ridiculous, outlandish, and inspired art and entertainment in Boston." At this point von Buhler began utilizing unconventional media in her art: video projection, living fauna, found objects, human detritus, and electronic audio. By combining these media, often enhanced with text and electronics, von Buhler's canvasses frequently became kinetic installations. "Regardless of medium, all of von Buhler's pieces require the viewer to get involved: sometimes physically, by feeding a caged animal or inserting a coin to operate a machine. For example, "Sir Repetitious," a man's transparent insides reveal two live rats, hungry for the food and attention of onlookers – feed the rodents with the supplied seed, and you are satisfying "Sir Repetitious" on physical and metaphorical levels. Miss Ann Thrope is a life-sized painting of a woman with two doves perched inside. When the birds move in the piece, they change its equilibrium and alter its intended meaning. A velvet-curtained puppet theater sets the stage for Show and Tell, a multimedia painting that explores the use of word versus action with hidden visual and auditory messages. "Please Don't Look Up My Skirt" is a commentary on date-rape in which a Botticelli-esque girl without arms or legs tries modestly to cover herself, imploring the viewer not to violate her; those who disregard the plea see what they have become when they look up her skirt. Cynth-O-Matic offers various plastic capsules containing actual samples of the artist's body hair and fluids from a vending machine. The piece is von Buhler's critique of those who attend art openings to chat with the artist and scarf hors d'oeuvres without buying any art. For only 25 cents they can buy a piece of the artist. Von Buhler's work provides commentary on morality, vanity, politics, and the art world itself". From 2001 - 2007, von Buhler's work appeared on the covers of New York's Gallery Guide, Communication Arts, Step by Step Graphics,[64] and NY Arts. A photograph of von Buhler taken at her New York loft for The Boston Globe was enlarged and used on billboards advertising the publication. Inspired by lying politicians, von Buhler altered and old carnival machine for "Shake Hands With Uncle Sam." For 25 cents, viewers shake Uncle Sam's hand, the dial spins, and lands on audio samples of "Weapon of mass destruction," "Iran Contra," "No New Taxes," or one of seven other bipartisan audio clips. The piece was created for "The Presidency" exhibit at Exit Art in Manhattan. In 2005, von Buhler created a video for another exhibit at Exit Art, "The Studio Visit". Her video was singled out by New York Times art critic Roberta Smith as one of the best. She also was chosen by the art space to move her art studio to the gallery for a few months where she had to create her work in the window while people watched her through Exit Art's windows. Her fine art appeared on TV in Law & Order SVU as the artwork of a serial killer, and in a fight scene of the show Kidnapped. In March 2006, Art & Antiques named von Buhler as "one of the top contemporary surrealists." However, she has also been linked to the Lowbrow, and Fluxus movements. Her art has been displayed in galleries and museums around the world, and her work is in the collections of Howard Stern, Jann Wenner, The Nassau County Museum of Art, The Staten Island Museum, The University of Toronto, The Opera Company of Philadelphia, Dana Farber Cancer Institute, and hundreds of personal collections.

=== Solo exhibits ===
- October 2012 - January 2013, "The Countess and Her Cats", The Mark Twain House and Museum, Hartford, CT
- September 20, 2009 - Jan 3, 2010, But Who Will Bell The Cats?, The Nassau County Museum of Art, Long Island, NY
- April 2007 - September 2007, Show and Tell, The Staten Island Museum, Staten Island, NYC
- February 2006, Cynth-O-Matic: Documented, Studio D'Ars, Milan, Italy
- October 2005, Cynth-O-Matic, CVB Space, New York, NY
- June–July 2005, Cynth-O-Matic, CVB Space, New York, NY
- April–May 2004, Cynth-O-Matic, 301 Gallery, Montserrat College of Art, Beverly, MA
- October 2004, Cynth-O-Matic, The Dollhaus Gallery, Williamsburg, Brooklyn, NY
- September 2001, Inside/Out, New England School of Art and Design, Boston, MA
- Spring 1999, Through the Looking-Glass, Darkly, National Boston Video Center, Boston, MA

=== The Carrozzini von Buhler Gallery ===
The Carrozzini von Buhler Gallery, also known as CvB Space, an art gallery, film location, and event space in New York City's Meatpacking district was owned and directed by von Buhler from 2003 - 2008. Stefania Carrozzini was the director of International Exhibition Projects at The Carrozzini von Buhler Gallery. In February, 2007, von Buhler curated an exhibit titled Andy Warhol: In His Wake featuring Warhol's superstars, Ultra Violet, Taylor Mead, Billy Name, and Ivy Nicholson along with artists such as Anton Perich and Amy Cohen Banker who were influenced by Warhol. For this exhibit von Buhler created The Great Warhola, an interactive, fortune-telling machine. Von Buhler claims that Warhol was a fortune teller, "with reality television and YouTube everyone has the 15 minutes of fame that Warhol predicted for them". This popular exhibit was featured on television in Japan, Switzerland and Germany. CVB Space and the historic, industrial building it is housed in has been featured in Sex and the City, Law & Order SVU, and Someone Like You (starring Ashley Judd, Hugh Jackman, and Greg Kinnear) and will be appearing in No Reservations (starring Catherine Zeta-Jones). CvB Space has become CvB Spaces, a location leasing agency for film and photography shoots. Von Buhler is the president of CvB Spaces

== Illustration ==
In the mid-nineties, she and Adam Buhler a.k.a. Adam von Buhler bought a large purple Victorian house in the Allston neighborhood of Boston. She painted the walls in jewel tones with patterns of climbing vines. "It was a creative turning point for me. When I moved into my house, I needed art for the walls. So, I started making these paintings that were much different than the style I had been working in. That is when I decided not to make any artwork that I did not want to put on my wall." Von Buhler's three-dimensional paintings have been reproduced and featured in a diverse variety of books, magazines, and newspapers from Rolling Stone to The New Yorker. Her work has appeared in more than a thousand magazines, books, publications, billboards, and CDs. In 1995 she was interviewed about her art in Mary Magdalen: An Intimate Portrait on the Lifetime Network. The expose was narrated by Penelope Ann Miller and also featured interviews with Martin Scorsese and Arch Bishop Rembert Weakland. In addition, a von Buhler portrait of Mary Magdalen which had been commissioned by The New Yorker was featured in the show's introductory graphics. In 1998, she was hired by Viking Publishing to illustrate a children's book, Nicholas Nicholson's Little Girl in Red Dress With Cat and Dog. This book garnered von Buhler a starred review in Publishers Weekly, which praised the "imaginative debut" and her "distinct sense of time and place." A tarot deck based upon the writings of William Shakespeare, "The Shakespeare Oracle: Let the Bard Predict Your Future," written by A. Bronwyn Llewellyn, was illustrated by von Buhler and released in 2003. In 2004 von Buhler's portraits of Madonna and Jimi Hendrix accompanied essays by Britney Spears and John Mayer in the "50th Anniversary of Rock and Roll" issue of Rolling Stone. The painting of Jimi Hendrix was built with a Stratocaster guitar as the singer's spine and the piece was set on fire. Both paintings are now in the collection of Jann Wenner.

=== Illustration awards and honors ===
- 1996 Gold Medal, Society of Illustrators of Los Angeles
- 1995 Gold Medal, The Visual Club, New York
- American Illustration, 39, 33, 25, 23, 21, 20, 18, 17, 14
- Society of Illustrators, 49, 46, 45, 42, 40, 38, 37
- Society of Illustrators of Los Angeles, 41, 36, 35
- Communication Arts magazine Illustration Annuals, 45, 43, 42, 41, 40, 39, 38, 37; Design Annual, 38

== Music ==
At the same time she changed her name, von Buhler became involved in the music industry. She started a performance art band, Women of Sodom, which won a Best Music Poll Award from the Boston Phoenix in 1997 and became a Boston sensation. Women of Sodom headlined clubs across the country and opened for Gwar, Voivod, God Lives Underwater and Psychotica. The band performed at New York City's Roseland Ballroom and Boston's Avalon as part of the Sextacy Ball, with My Life With The Thrill Kill Kult and Lords of Acid also on the bill. Their album, Boots, featured vocals and lyrics by von Buhler and music by Xavier Dietrich II, and was released in 1997 on Pussykitty Records. At this time von Buhler and her husband started a record label named after their house with the award-winning designer Clifford Stoltze. "In the 1990s, it was impossible to walk into an Allston club or Cambridge bar without tripping over one of Cynthia von Buhler's paintings, music projects, or a band signed to her record label. If there was ever a queen of the Boston scene, it was von Buhler." Castle von Buhler also released a series of art and music CD compilations titled Soon, Anon, and Nigh. The artist explains the titles this way: "Soon there will be a cure for AIDS...and then we came up with Anon and Nigh which means the same thing." In honor of von Buhler's close college friend, William Lincoln Tisdale, who had died from the disease, proceeds from these compilations were donated to various AIDS charities. The CDs won various design awards and many of the young illustrators who created the artwork flourished. Von Buhler contributed musically and artistically to the compilations and her first work (which incorporated a live dove) was honored by Society of Illustrators in New York City. Curators began approaching von Buhler, offering her exhibits in Boston and New York City. She was chosen by Boston Magazine as one of the "40 Bostonians We Love" in their June 2002 cover feature article. Von Buhler was frequently featured on the covers of The Boston Globe, The Boston Phoenix, The Improper Bostonian, and many other Boston-based art and music publications. She appeared so frequently in The Boston Phoenix they named her "their unofficial mascot." She also appeared twice on MTV; as Bettie Page in an MTV music video for the band The Amazing Crowns (which was previewed on Beavis and Butthead) and in a sitcom called Apt 3F. Von Buhler formed and managed her husband's band Splashdown, and helped them get signed with Capitol Records. In 2001, after Splashdown angrily left Capitol Records, von Buhler's band Countess released a rock opera record about the evils of pop stardom and the music industry. Ironically, the project was funded through a demo deal from MCA Records. Countess was nominated for a Boston Music Award. They opened for Karen Finley at Royally F***ed, a three-day event featuring visual and performance art in at The Boston Institute of Contemporary Art and the Paradise Rock Club. In 2001, the last year that von Buhler lived at Castle von Buhler, she turned the second floor into The Dietrich von Buhler Gallery "for artists who want to do things that aren't market-driven, that aren't necessarily for sale, that are cutting-edge. Art that you probably wouldn't want to put in your house but is really interesting to view, and opens your mind to new ideas.", A curator from The Whitney Museum in New York City stopped by looking for artists to be featured in their Whitney Biennial exhibit., The house became well known for von Buhler's unique parties and art exhibits.

=== Discography ===
- 2001 Shooting Star, Countess, Castle von Buhler Records (Funded by MCA Records)
- 1999 Nigh, art and music compilation, AIDS benefit, producer and contributor
- 1997 Anon, art and music compilation, AIDS Action Committee benefit, producer and contributor
- 1997 Boots, Women of Sodom, PussyKitty Records/Castle von Buhler Records
- 1996 Soon, art and music compilation, AIDS Action Committee benefit, producer and contributor

=== Awards ===
- 2002 Countess, Best Club Act (nomination), Boston Music Awards
- 1997 Women of Sodom, Most Deviant Act, Boston Phoenix Best Music Poll

== Parties ==
Von Buhler is renowned for throwing lavish, circus-themed parties. These parties started in Boston and have continued in Connecticut and New York City. In 2010 von Buhler illustrated a graphic novel entitled Evelyn Evelyn: A Terrible Tale in Two Tomes (Dark Horse), about conjoined twins. The book was a collaboration with musicians Amanda Palmer and Jason Webley, and the foreword was written by Neil Gaiman. To celebrate the completion of the artwork for the two-set book, Palmer and Gaiman's marriage engagement, and her own birthday, von Buhler's held a lavish, 'Freaks'-themed birthday party at a Manhattan penthouse loft. Von Buhler was dressed in a custom-made latex mermaid tail and greeted her guests from a claw foot bathtub filled with water. In homage to the BP Oil Spill victims von Buhler created an oil-slick mermaid installation featuring live models. The party was attended by many literary luminaries: Lemony Snicket, Neil Gaiman, Jonathan Ames, Michael Chabon, Adele Griffin and others. Scenes from the rooftop merry-go-round, von Buhler's art, and Empire Snafu Restoration Project art were used in Salman Rushdie's book trailer for Luka and the Fire of Life. A few of the party guests were also chosen as actors for the trailer.
