= Wednesday Mourning =

American actor, model and curator

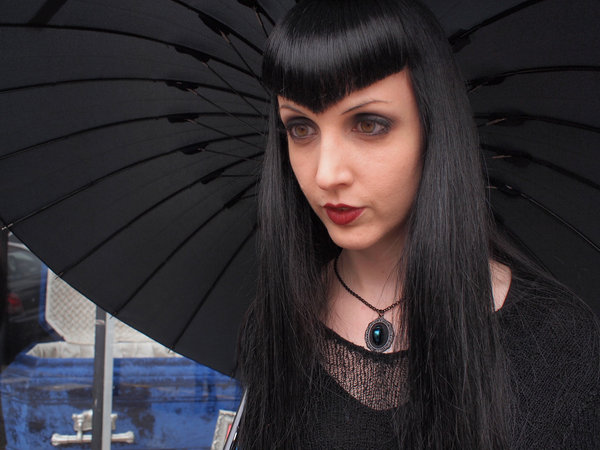
- Born: San Antonio, Texas
- Occupations: Model, journalist, curator, actress
- Height: 5 ft 8 in (1.73 m)

Wednesday Mourning is an American actress and model. She specializes in the Goth subculture and has been influential in goth fashion, as well as being the celebrity spokesmodel for Atelier Gothique and appearing as a model for the band My Chemical Romance's CD Welcome To The Black Parade. She was awarded 2010 Goth Day Model of the year and LA Weekly's Goth Girl of the Week, and since 2012, Mourning has been a co-star on Oddities: San Francisco, a Science Channel program. Mourning is also curator of an esoteric bookstore, Orphic Vellum Books, the only one of its kind in the U.S. She has appeared in several publications including Gothic Beauty and Elle Magazine and is a writing contributor for Celtic Family Magazine.

== Career ==
Wednesday Mourning was born in San Antonio, Texas, circa 1978. Her chosen name, Wednesday, is based on a Victorian nursery rhyme Monday's Child. The surname of Mourning was added later. By the age of fourteen, Mourning was inspired by a scene in the film The Hunger when the gothic music group Bauhaus appeared on stage. She began her career in modeling at the age of seventeen while working at a club where she was asked to be on the club's flyer. After moving to Hollywood, Mourning worked as both an actress (appearing in Star Trek, 2009) and model; becoming a regular for Lip Service and working various runway shows including Ventura Fashion Week (2008), Hello Kitty Fashion Show (2009), and Visions' SXSW (2010).

Since 2008, Mourning has appeared in a variety of print media including books Gothic: Dark Glamour by Valerie Steel, Black Magic, White Noise by R. Klanten, and Eternal by VK Forest. Mourning is also listed under the term 'Wednesday' in the Encyclopedia Gothica (2011) by Liisa Ladouceur and Gary Pullin.

On October 31, 2013, Mourning was alongside Audra Kunkle on ABC Network's The View to talk about all things Halloween and to promote their show Oddities: San Francisco.

In December 2016, Mourning announced on her social media her plans to host a web series called Wednesday's Wonderium. The series began the following month and is created by Dave Haaz-Baroque with the Shadow Circus Creature Theatre, and, as Mourning states, has "puppets, animation, and weirdness."
