= Matt Ehling =

American documentary film maker

Matt Ehling is a prolific documentary film maker from Minnesota. His films are often political in nature. He frequently collaborates with Jim Taylor. Some of his films are Access (2000), and Forbidden City (1997), an investigation of the growth of privatized, gate-guarded communities in suburban America. He recently helped shoot Of Dolls and Murder, a documentary film on doll house crime scene dioramas.

He has written articles on legal affairs, history, and civil liberties for a variety of publications, including the on-line news magazine Minnpost.com.

In 2010, Ehling founded Public Record Media, a journalism project that uses public record laws to obtain government documents. In 2012, he received the John R. Finnegan Freedom of Information Award from the Minnesota Coalition on Government Information.
