= Stiffs, Inc. =

New York City Punk Band

Stiffs, Inc. was an ostensibly morbidicesque American, Victorian-themed New York City punk band, formed in 1992.

Brought together in New York City under the name 'Stiffs, Incorporated', the group were active between 1992 and 1998. Their early material is influenced by 1970s English punk. Through theatrical shows and morbid lyrics they quickly developed an original style which can be described as 'Post-Orwellian Victorian'. The band produced two albums along with a number of singles released on 7" and 12" records. Nix Nought Nothing was released in 1995 and Electric Chair Theatre was released in 1997.

"Stiffs, inc. delivers what may be the most artful and intelligent record to emerge from the NYC punk renaissance of groups like D-Generation, Trick Babies and NY Loose..." Tim Stegall CMJ New Music Monthly, August 1995.

They played their final show on May 24, 1998. Paul Boering has gone on to form Beaut with Marti Domination (ex-Blacklips Performance Cult, Matthew Barney's The Cremaster Cycle). Whitey Sterling has gone on to form the electronic based outfit known as Umbrella Brigade. Umbrella Brigade released their debut album, Ex Nihilo, in 2008. In 2010, Sterling made an appearance on Oddities which airs on the Discovery Channel.

== Members ==
- Whitey Sterling (vocals)
- Paul Boering/Joshua Arfield (guitar)
- R.X. Mauser (bass guitar)
- Bryn Mars/Jeremy Arfield (drums)
- Byron Lang (keyboards)
- Poison Eve (emcee)
- Donnie T. Tremors (drums) 1992-1993

== Discography ==
=== Albums ===
- Nix Nought Nothing (1995 Onion / American Recordings)
- Electric Chair Theatre Presents (1997 Gladglum & Others Ltd.)

=== Singles and EPs ===
- "Destroy All Art" / "Chelsea" (1994 Aluminium Records) - 7"
- "Blown Away Baby" / "Work, work, work" (1994 Holy Plastic) - 7"
- "Chelsea" / "Mary Pickford" (album versions) - 7"
- "Engineering 2" / "One Chord Wonders" (1995 Titanic Tours) - 7" split single with Jonathan Fire*Eater
- "Panic in the Springtime" (1997 Dismal Abysmal Recordings) - 7" split single with The Brickbats
- "Richard" / "Noughty Boys (pre-version)" / "The Magician Ballet" (1997 Gladglum & Others Ltd. with Ammann Enterprises) - 12"

=== Compilation tracks ===
- "The Magician (Remix No. 6)" / "Newton's 2d Law (Defied)" (1997 Dismal Abysmal Recordings, "Watch Your Step Volume 2 - The Curse of the Hearse" )

== Tours and shows ==
April 2, 1996: New York City, NY – Irving Plaza - Love and Rockets, Dandy Warhols, Stiffs, Inc.
May 22, 1998: NYC, NY - Coney Island High
May 24, 1998: NYC, NY - Mother (Final Show :,| )
