= Minky Woodcock =

American comic book series

- The cover to Minky Woodcock: The Girl Who Handcuffed Houdini #3, with art by Cynthia von Buhler

Publication information
- Publisher: Hard Case Crime; Titan Publishing Group
- Format: Limited series
- Publication date: November 2017
- No. of issues: Minky Woodcock: The Girl Who Handcuffed Houdini: 4 Minky Woodcock: The Girl Who Electrified Tesla: 4

Creative team
- Created by: Cynthia von Buhler
- Written by: Cynthia von Buhler
- Artist: Cynthia von Buhler
- Letterer(s): Simon Bowland; Jim Campbell
- Colorist: Cynthia von Buhler

Collected editions
- Minky Woodcock - The Girl Who Handcuffed Houdini: ISBN 9781785863974
- Minky Woodcock: The Girl Who Electrified Tesla: ISBN 9781787730113

Minky Woodcock is a fictional comic book crime series created by writer-artist Cynthia von Buhler. The title character is a private detective who has appeared in three limited series published by Titan Books' Hard Case Crime imprint and a theatrical show. The storylines feature sizeable appearances from historical figures such as Harry Houdini, Arthur Conan Doyle, Nikola Tesla and Josephine Baker.

== Creation ==
Von Buhler researched the death of Houdini and based the story on true crime evidence. She found Houdini a "fascinating character", and admitted to taking some liberties, stating she "added a little S&M innuendo to the storyline and book title." Von Buhler was relatively new to comics, her only previous work in the medium being working on Evelyn Evelyn for Dark Horse Comics. Von Buhler made the character bisexual in reference to her own sexual orientation. The author often visited Metairie Cemetery for inspiration.

From the start Buhler envisioned the series as both a comic and a stage show, modelling many of the characters on real-life actors she was acquainted with from previous theatre work, particularly burlesque performers. Minky Woodcock was visually modelled on entertainer Pearls Daily, who also posed for alternate photo covers of some issues; Bess Houdini was drawn after Robyn Adele Anderson; Miss La Chatte was drawn from Delysia La Chatte; and Margery on Veronica Varlow.

== Publishing history ==
The first issue of Minky Woodcock - The Girl Who Handcuffed Houdini was published in November 2017, and von Buhler threw a lavish launch party attended by many of those involved in the series' creation, including many of the models David W. Mack and Robert McGinnis were among the cover artists for the series. Von Buhler was interviewed alongside Daily and Hard Case Crime founder Charles Ardai at New York Comic Con in 2018. After the four-issue mini-series concluded, Titan collected it as a single hardback volume.

In a sequel was announced soon afterwards, initially planned to concern the death of Olive Thomas and named as Minky Woodcock: They Die Fast on Broadway!. However, the second mini-series would not appear until 2021, now pairing Minky with Nikola Tesla. McGinnis and Dani Strips were among those to provide variant cover art, with Daily again 'reprising' the role of Minky on photo covers. Von Buhler avoided depicting Tesla's famous feud with Thomas Edison as she felt it had been covered before, and implied the Olive Thomas storyline would instead become a third series.

In September 2024, a new four-issue installment of the series, Minky Woodcock: The Girl Called Cthulhu, was announced. The collected edition was released in July 2025.

== Plot ==
Minky is the daughter of famed private detective Benedict Woodcock, reputed to be the inspiration for Sherlock Holmes. Her mother drowned when she was young and her brother - Benedict Jr or simply Bennie - has no interest in being a detective, instead wanting a career in dance; nevertheless he is part of the Benedict & Son agency. Mindy, a devoted fan of Agatha Christie (with a pet rabbit named after the author), very much wants to be a detective but is instead the agency's secretary - much to her displeasure.

=== The Girl Who Handcuffed Houdini ===
In October 1926, Arthur Conan Doyle attempts to engage the agency to expose Harry Houdini, but Woodcock and son are absent on business in Florida. Doyle believes the escapologist and sceptic to be supernaturally gifted, using his abilities to act as a gatekeeper for the spiritual world. Minky is stunned that the creator of the logical Sherlock Holmes has such strong spiritual beliefs. He persuades her to attend a séance held by Margery of Boston; Minky isn't fooled by the medium's tricks and flees when Margaery attempts to molest her. She then runs into Harry Houdini's wife Bess in a speakeasy. After learning Minky is a detective and fearing a spiritualist threat to her husband's life, Bess hires Minky as Houdini's assistant.

She joins the show for its North American tour, along with a nurse called Miss La Chatte. Houdini tells Minky of his feud with Doyle due to his regular debunking of spiritualists, and teaches her some of his feats, including the Chinese Water Torture Cell. Bess falls ill, and Harry makes a pass at Mink; she tells his wife but she is uses to his infidelities and merely cares he is kept safe. During one show Houdini's apparatus is sabotaged and he breaks his ankle. While recuperating he poses for drawings by a pair of McGill University students, and - after boasting of his ability to take blows to the stomach - is punched repeatedly by one J. Gordon Whitehead. He initially seems unharmed, though he later collapses during sex with Minky.

Minky believes there is more to the attack than it seems, and stays behind to investigate Whitehead, with La Chatte filling in as assistant. Investigating Whitehead's lodgings, she finds the man is an avid spiritualist. Meanwhile, Houdini collapses once again; La Chatte administers an injection meant to fight his peritonitis but it instead kills him. On the advice of her husband's agent, Bess refuses an autopsy. Minky is suspected of playing a role in his death but evades the police; she is cleared when the McGill students back Whitehead's story about the punches, and Houdini's death is officially recorded as an accident. Whitehead attempts to have Minky drowned in her bath, and when that fails he and co-conspirator La Chatte try to trap her in the Chinese Water Torture Cell. She escapes and overpowers them, and they admit to being part of the pro-spiritualist Crewe Circle. Minky takes her findings to Bess but Houdini's widow reveals that as she will receive double indemnity life insurance if her husband's death is kept as officially being an accident. Minky returns to the agency office moments after her father and brother arrive back, stunning them by showing the substantial fee she received for her work in their absence.

=== The Girl Who Electrified Tesla ===
At the tail end of 1943, Bennie has finally left the agency to become a dancer. Their father, grievously ill with cancer, stubbornly refuses to rename the agency despite being hospitalised. J. P. Morgan Jr. attempts to engage Minky's father to investigate Nikola Tesla's new death ray, but settles for hiring Minky herself. She is also engaged for the same reason by John Trump, who is working in the hospital where he father is being treated. After seeing in the New Year at a lavish party hosted by Josephine Baker, she meets Tesla in Bryant Park. The pair strike up a rapport and he takes her back to his hotel, where Tesla tells her of the war of the currents and his dispute with the Morgan family. The inventor introduces her to his pigeon Mirna, and tells her he believes his device will be a powerful deterrent that will prevent war; Tesla keeps the plans for the device in a secret location. Minky decides to investigate Morgan's brothers, OSS staff attached to Baker. Spotting their riverboat she fakes a rescue to get onboard and meets Baker and the Morgans. However, as soon as they are left alone with Minky the Morgans attempt to rape her, and she flees. She meets with Tesla again and drops him off, only for someone to try and run the scientist down.

Minky is able to save him at the cost of her car. The police are unable to identify the driver and don't take Minky's claims of attempted murder seriously. After a meeting with Morgan Jr. she is seduced by one of his associates and is shocked to find he is a Nazi, and kills the man after they have sex. Minky experiences nightmares about her mother's death and narrowly escapes being killed by an electrified manhole cover. When visiting Tesla she finds he has died; the police suspect Minky is involved and imprison her.

Trump bails Minky out, and she informs Baker of her beliefs that Tesla was being targeted by a Nazi conspiracy. The maid at Tesla's hotel gives her the body of Mirna to bury, and she meets up with a fortune teller named Rhonda who possesses the key to the scientist's safe deposit box. Minky narrowly avoids another attempted electrocution and the key has been stolen. Arriving late, she finds the box already open - having contained only birdseed and a framed picture of a pigeon. Later, going through her mother's things Minky finds a notebook full of case details showing she played a far greater role in Benedict's career than she previously knew. She meets up with Baker, whose OSS contacts have identified the car's driver as Otto Skorzeny. The pair track him to an old laboratory of Tesla's in Long Island; however they are jumped by the Nazi, who ties them up and attempts to electrocute them.

After advice from Tesla, Minky has taken to wearing rubber shoes and is able to save them both from death. After they escape she realises the plans for the device are hidden with Mirna and recovers them. She visits Benedict at hospital, where he confesses her mother was the real detective, and that she drowned after discovering him having sex with a mistress. Baker is able to capture Skorzeny, clearing Minky of Tesla's murder. Her father dies soon afterwards, leaving her a note simply saying "Woodcock & Daughter". Minky makes flawed copies of the plans that she gives to both Morgan Jr. and Trump. She meets up with Baker, telling her she believed Tesla committed suicide by voluntarily stopping breathing to prevent his invention getting into the wrong hands. As Minky and Baker begin to make love they burn the real plans for the ray device.

== Stage ==
Later in 2018, Von Buhler created an immersive theater version of Minky Woodcock: The Girl Who Handcuffed Houdini through her Speakeasy Dollhouse production company, with Daily in the title role and Houdini played by Vincent Cinque. The show played at Theatre 80 in Manhattan, Von Buhler herself played Minky's stunt double for the Chinese Water Torture Cell. The show ran from October 5 to November 30. The production received positive reviews.

== Collected editions ==
Title	ISBN	Release date	Issues
Minky Woodcock: The Girl Who Handcuffed Houdini	9781785863974	15 August 2018	Minky Woodcock: The Girl Who Handcuffed Houdini #1-4
Minky Woodcock: The Girl Who Electrified Tesla	9781787730113	30 November 2021	Minky Woodcock: The Girl Who The Girl Who Electrified Tesla #1-4
Minky Woodcock: The Girl Called Cthulhu	9781787743298	8 July 2025	Minky Woodcock: The Girl Called Cthulhu #1-4

== Reception ==
Sara Century of Syfy praised the series, stating "the bizarre, surrealist imagery and excellent illustration of the book set its own unique tone". Neil Gaiman was also a fan of von Buhler's art, and a testimonial from the author appeared on the covers for Mindy Woodcock: The Girl Who Handcuffed Houdini #1. Johann du Plessis of GWW gave The Girl Who Electrified Tesla a perfect score, calling it "an amazing book".
