= Blewett Harrison Lee =

American lawyer (1867–1951)

- Born: March 1, 1867; Columbus, Mississippi, U.S.
- Died: April 18, 1951 (aged 84); Atlanta, Georgia, U.S.
- Education: Mississippi State University (BS); University of Virginia; Harvard Law School (LLB, MA)
- Occupations: Law professor, attorney
- Known for: Expert on railroad and aviation law
- Spouse: Frances Glessner Lee

Blewett Harrison Lee (March 1, 1867 – April 18, 1951) was an American legal scholar and corporate attorney who taught at the Northwestern University Law School and University of Chicago Law School, and served as general counsel to the Illinois Central Railroad.

== Biography ==
Lee was born in Columbus, Mississippi, the only child to Regina Lilly Harrison and Stephen D. Lee, a general in the Confederate States Army and later president of Mississippi State University from 1880 to 1899. In 1883, Lee graduated with a B.S. from Agricultural and Mechanical College of Mississippi, as MSU was then titled, where he was the valedictorian. From 1883 to 1885, he studied at the University of Virginia, serving as editor of Virginia University magazine and graduating in 1885 from the schools of German, English, and Moral Philosophy. He attended Harvard Law School, obtaining his LL.B. and M.A. in 1888, at the age of 21, and was one of the founders of the Harvard Law Review. After law school, he pursued a year of graduate studies at the universities in Freiburg and Leipzig, Germany. Then, Lee was law clerk, or in the parlance of the era served as private secretary, for Associate Justice Horace Gray of the Supreme Court of the United States during the 1889–1890 term. From 1891 to 1893, he was lecturer at Atlanta Law School.

In 1893, he moved to Chicago where he was a professor at Northwestern University Law School until 1901, and then at the University of Chicago Law School from 1902 to 1903.

In 1909, Lee was named general counsel for the Illinois Central Railroad, and served in that position during the Illinois Central shopmen's strike of 1911. In 1913, he published an article on aviation law, “Sovereignty of the Air," in the American Journal of International Law, arguing the rules of railroad law should guide regulation of commercial aircraft. In 1913, he presented the paper at the annual meetings of the Tennessee Bar Association and Alabama Bar Association, and spoke at the annual meeting of The Mississippi Bar on railroad litigation. In 1916, he inherited his childhood house in Columbus, Mississippi, which his grandfather had built, and sold the property to the city for use as the site of the Stephen D. Lee High School. In his later years, he became fascinated with psychic phenomena and spiritualism, publishing several law review articles on the religious freedom implications of prosecution of practitioners.

== Personal life ==
In 1898, Blewett wed Frances Glessner of Chicago, who had a career as a forensic scientist. They had three children: John Glessner Lee, Frances Lee (Martin), and Martha Lee. In 1914, the couple divorced.

== See also ==
- List of law clerks for the second seat of the Supreme Court of the United States
- List of law clerks for the eighth seat of the Supreme Court of the United States

== Selected publications ==
- Lee, Blewett (February 1923). "The Fortune Teller". Virginia Law Review. 9 (4): 249–266. doi:10.2307/1064993. JSTOR 1064993. S2CID 155230971.
- Lee, Blewett (April 1921). "Psychic Phenomena and the Law". Harvard Law Review. 34 (6): 625–638. doi:10.2307/1328929. JSTOR 1328929.
- Lee, Blewett (February 1921). "The Conjurer". Virginia Law Review. 7 (5): 370–377. doi:10.2307/1064358. JSTOR 1064358.
- Lee, Blewett (July 1913). "Sovereignty of Air". The American Journal of International Law. 7 (3): 470–496. doi:10.2307/2187429. hdl:2027/mdp.35112102629690. JSTOR 2187429. S2CID 147096961.
- Lee, Blewett (1889). "Limitations Imposed by the Federal Constitution on the Right of the States to Enact Quarantine Laws". Harvard Law Review. 2 (6): 267–282. doi:10.2307/1322196. JSTOR 1322196. Paid subscription access.
