= Bernice Blake Perry =

American pilot and photographer

- Born: Bernice Gertrude Blake; March 2, 1905; Manchester, New Hampshire, U.S.
- Died: July 10, 1996 (aged 91); Nashua, New Hampshire, U.S.
- Occupations: Aviator, photographer, philanthropist
- Spouse: Winthrop Perry

Bernice Blake Perry (March 2, 1905 – July 10, 1996) was an American pilot and photographer. She was the first woman to earn a pilot's license in New Hampshire and the first female commercial pilot in New England. When she earned her license in 1929 she was one of only 117 female American pilots and was a charter member of the international female pilots' organization the Ninety-Nines.

== Career ==
She formed a photography and aerial photography business with her husband and took photos for organization such as the MacDowell Colony and the Cathedral of the Pines. One of her photographs at MacDowell was of Leonard Bernstein during his time there. She also did work for various news organization, including the New Hampshire newspaper The Cabinet. Her aerial photographs included every airfield in New Hampshire and other sites in order to help develop new airports in New Hampshire.

== Philanthropy ==
As an heir of the Blake's restaurant business she was known for her philanthropy. In 1984, she helped create the Hot Air for High Hopes Balloon Festival, an annual hot air balloon event that raised tens of thousand of dollars for charity until its end in 2006. Upon her death in 1996, Perry left $4.5 million in scholarships for students in Milford, Lyndeborough and Wilton and donated over 43,000 photo negatives she had taken to the Milford Historical Society.

== Personal life ==
Her father owned Blake's Creamery in Manchester, New Hampshire, and she met her husband, Winthrop Perry, at the airport.

== See also ==
- New Hampshire Historical Marker No. 268: Bernice Blake Perry (1905–1996)
