= Of Dolls and Murder =

- Directed by: Susan Marks
- Produced by: John Dehn
- Narrated by: John Waters
- Cinematography: Matt Ehling
- Edited by: John Dehn
- Music by: John Dehn
- Release date: April 14, 2012 (Titanic International Filmpresence Festival)
- Language: English

Of Dolls and Murder is a documentary film about a collection of dollhouse crime scenes and society's collective fascination with death. It was released in April 2012.

== Subject matter ==
In the 1930s and 1940s, heiress Frances Glessner Lee created dollhouse crime scenes to help train detectives in the art of reading crime scenes.

The dollhouses, known as The Nutshell Studies of Unexplained Death, are on permanent loan to the Maryland Medical Examiner's Office in Baltimore, and are not open to the public.

The film follows how these intricate dioramas are still used to train homicide detectives, despite all the technological advances in death investigation. The dioramas also provided inspiration for The Miniature Killer, a recurring villain in season seven of CSI: Crime Scene Investigation. The villain's modus operandi is to leave behind accurate dioramas of her crime scenes.

In a further exploration of morbid curiosity, the filmmakers also shadow a Baltimore homicide detective, and visit The Body Farm, a famous forensic anthropology site in Tennessee where researchers study the decay of bodies.
