= Oddities (TV series) =

American reality television series

- Genre: Documentary/reality television
- Starring: Mike Zohn, Evan Michelson, Ryan Matthew Cohn
- Country of origin: United States
- Original language: English
- No. of seasons: 5
- No. of episodes: 73

Production
- Production location: New York City
- Running time: 30 minutes
- Production company: Leftfield Pictures

Original release
- Network: Discovery Channel, Science Channel
- Release: November 4, 2010 – April 27, 2014

Oddities is a half-hour documentary/reality television program which follows the operation of an East Village, Manhattan shop which trades in antiques and other rarities. The show premiered on November 4, 2010, and airs on the Discovery Channel and its sister network, the Science Channel.

Oddities focuses on the day-to-day operation of Obscura Antiques & Oddities, and stars co-owners Mike Zohn and Evan Michelson and buyer Ryan Matthew Cohn, with appearances by other employees and customers. The store's employees search flea markets, personal collections, auctions, and antique shows for unique and unusual artifacts. Odd items bought and sold by the shop or featured on the show have included a mummified cat, a rhesus monkey skull, art made from nail clippings, and a straitjacket.

Celebrities appearing on the show have included Jonathan Davis of the band Korn, Whitey Sterling, singer for the New York band Stiffs, Inc., musician Genesis P-Orridge, actress/comedian Amy Sedaris, actor Matthew Gray Gubler, artist Ann Hirsch, actress Chloë Sevigny, musician Natalia Paruz ('Saw Lady'), video game designer and commercial space flight enthusiast Richard Garriott, director Lloyd Kaufman, nerdcore rapper Schaffer The Darklord, musician Voltaire, musician Moby, artist Cynthia von Buhler, actor/comedian Paul Dinello, burlesque dancer Dita Von Teese, and "High Pitch Eric" of The Howard Stern Show. New York playwright Edgar Oliver has appeared on the program multiple times and appears in the show's title sequence admiring a straitjacket.

== Episodes ==
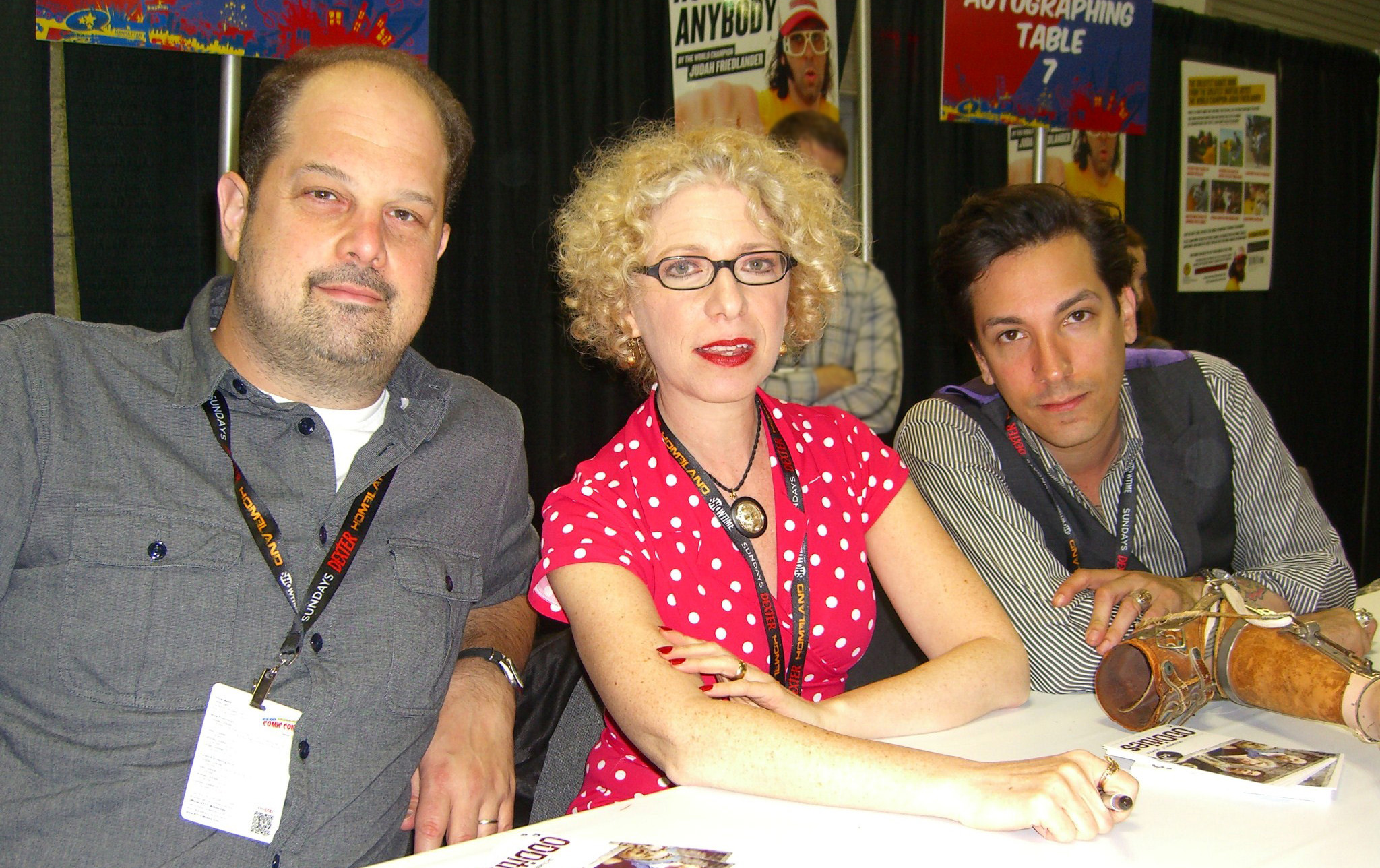
From left to right: Mike Zohn, Evan Michelson and Ryan Matthew Cohn at the 2011 New York Comic Con.

=== Season 1: 2010–2011 ===
#	#	Title	Original US airdate
1	1	Mummy Cat	November 4, 2010
2	2	The Model Mortician	November 11, 2010
3	3	Spider Prank	November 18, 2010
4	4	Skull Envy	December 9, 2010
5	5	Mummified Hand	December 16, 2010
6	6	Four-Legged Chicken	December 23, 2010
7	7	Pickled Pig	December 30, 2010
8	8	Teeth On A Stick	January 6, 2011
9	9	The Chair	January 13, 2011
10	10	The Bulb Cruncher	April 9, 2011

=== Season 2: 2011 ===
#	#	Title	Original US airdate
11	1	Shrunken Head	April 9, 2011
12	2	Raising The Dead	April 16, 2011
13	3	Three Little Piggies	April 23, 2011
14	4	Rock Star Embalmer	April 30, 2011
15	5	Romancing The Bone	May 7, 2011
16	6	Edison's Monstrous Creation	May 14, 2011
17	7	The Horaffe	May 21, 2011
18	8	Piece of Mind	May 28, 2011
19	9	Hedgehog Homolog	June 4, 2011
20	10	Love Stones	June 11, 2011

=== Season 3: 2011–2012 ===
#	#	Title	Original US airdate
21	1	Edgar's Creation and Robot Relations	November 24, 2011
22	2	Shot Through the Heart	November 24, 2011
23	3	Ghost Rider	December 17, 2011
24	4	Holiday Bizarre	December 24, 2011
25	5	Best of Oddities	December 24, 2011
26	6	The Smoking Lung	January 21, 2012
27	7	Fingernails and Just for Males	January 21, 2012
28	8	Insane & The Membrane	February 4, 2012
29	9	Mummy's Private Collection	February 4, 2012
30	10	Seeing Scars	February 11, 2012
31	11	The Arsenic Avenger	February 18, 2012
32	12	Sorceress of Love	February 18, 2012
33	13	The Power of a Grey Skull	February 25, 2012
34	14	Black Magic Woman	February 25, 2012
35	15	Holly-Odd	March 3, 2012
36	16	Heads or Fails	March 3, 2012
37	17	A Gurney for Grandpa	March 10, 2012
38	18	Meat Mastodon	March 10, 2012
39	19	Killer Queen	June 2, 2012
40	20	Keeping Austin Odd	June 9, 2012
41	21	Mounting Tensions	June 16, 2012
42	?	Holiday Bizarre #2	December 22, 2012
43	?	Best Of #2	December 29, 2012

=== Season 4: 2013–2014 ===
#	#	Title	Original US airdate
44	1	Return to Holly-Odd	February 9, 2013
45	2	Mutant Mascot	February 16, 2013
46	3	Dummy Drama & Internal Trauma	February 23, 2013
47	4	Skull Camera Obscura	March 2, 2013
48	5	Taking Life by the Ears, Nose & Throat	March 9, 2013
49	6	Heads, Kegels, Knees & Toes	April 13, 2013
50	7	Blood Suckers & Brain Eaters	April 20, 2013
51	8	March of Pangolin	April 27, 2013
52	9	A Bug's Afterlife	May 11, 2013
53	10	Slim Goodbody's Anatomical Adventure	May 18, 2013
54	11	The Mummy Phallus Returns	June 8, 2013
55	12	Skull in the City & a Two-Headed Kitty	June 8, 2013
56	13	Vampires of PhilaHELLphia	June 15, 2013
57	14	Bat Man & Ryan	June 15, 2013
58	15	Obscura Is Loved to Death	July 13, 2013
59	16	Brain Bits & Baby Gifts	October 29, 2013
60	17	No Guts, No Gory	October 29, 2013
61	18	Lights, Camera, Duck Impaction!	October 29, 2013
62	19	Evan's Odd Anniversary	October 29, 2013
63	?	Holiday Bizarre #3	January 4, 2014

=== Season 5: 2014 ===
#	#	Title	Original US airdate
64	1	Tongue Tied	January 18, 2014
65	2	Head Shrinking 101 With Ryan	January 18, 2014
66	3	New Oddleans	January 25, 2014
67	4	Don't Get Testis	January 25, 2014
68	5	Jails, Fails, and Salem Tales	April 27, 2014
69	6	Chic-ODD-o	April 27, 2014
70	7	Elephant Skull In The Room	April 27, 2014
71	8	Music to My Gears	April 27, 2014
72	9	Skeletons and Gwar	April 27, 2014
73	10	Instant Chimera	April 27, 2014

== Spinoffs ==
A spinoff of Oddities, Oddities: San Francisco, debuted June 23, 2012 on the Science Channel with co-star Wednesday Mourning. This series focuses on another antiques store, Loved to Death, which is located in San Francisco's Haight-Ashbury district. It has since been cancelled.

Another spinoff, Odd Folks Home, features notable regulars from Oddities and debuted November 22, 2012. It has since been cancelled.

== See also ==
- Pawn Stars, about a Las Vegas pawn shop
- American Pickers, starring itinerant buyers of antiques and collectibles
- American Restoration, chronicling the daily activities at Rick's Restorations, an antique restoration store
