= Frances Glessner Lee =

Mother of forensic science (1878–1962)

- Born: March 25, 1878; Chicago, Illinois, U.S.
- Died: January 27, 1962 (aged 83); Bethlehem, New Hampshire, U.S.
- Known for: "Mother of forensic science"
- Notable work: Nutshell Studies of Unexplained Death
- Spouse: Blewett Harrison Lee

Frances Glessner Lee (March 25, 1878 – January 27, 1962) was an American forensic scientist. She was influential in developing the science of forensics in the United States. To this end, she created the Nutshell Studies of Unexplained Death, twenty true crime scene dioramas recreated in minute detail at dollhouse scale, used for training homicide investigators. Eighteen of the Nutshell Studies of Unexplained Death are still in use for teaching purposes by the Maryland Office of the Chief Medical Examiner, and the dioramas are also now considered works of art. Glessner Lee also helped to establish the Department of Legal Medicine at Harvard University, and endowed the Magrath Library of Legal Medicine there. She became the first female police captain in the United States, and is known as the "mother of forensic science".

== Early life ==
Glessner Lee was born in Chicago on March 25, 1878 to John Jacob Glessner and Frances Macbeth Glessner.

Her father, John Jacob Glessner, was an industrialist who became wealthy from International Harvester. She and her brother were educated at home; her brother went to Harvard.

As a child, Frances fell ill with tonsillitis, and her mother took her to the doctor. When the first doctor prescribed a dangerous treatment for her illness, the Glessners sought a second opinion and Frances underwent a successful surgery at a time when surgery was very dangerous and often lethal.Frances became interested in learning more about medicine because of this experience. When summering in the White Mountains, local doctors allowed her to attend home visits with them. There Glessner learned the skills of nursing.

She inherited the Harvester fortune, which gave her the money to pursue her interest in how detectives could examine clues.

== Career ==
Glessner Lee was inspired to pursue forensic investigation by one of her brother's classmates, George Burgess Magrath, with whom she was close friends. He was studying medicine at Harvard Medical School and was particularly interested in death investigation. Magrath would become a professor in pathology at Harvard Medical School and a chief medical examiner in Boston, and together they lobbied to have coroners replaced by medical professionals.

In 1931, Glessner Lee endowed the Harvard Department of Legal Medicine—the first such department in the country—and her gifts would later establish the George Burgess Magrath Library, a chair in legal medicine, and the Harvard Seminars in Homicide Investigation.

She also endowed the Harvard Associates in Police Science, a national organization for the furtherance of forensic science; it has a division dedicated to her, called the Frances Glessner Lee Homicide School.

In 1943, she became the first woman in the United States of America to occupy the position of New Hampshire State Police captain.

=== Nutshell Studies of Unexplained Death ===
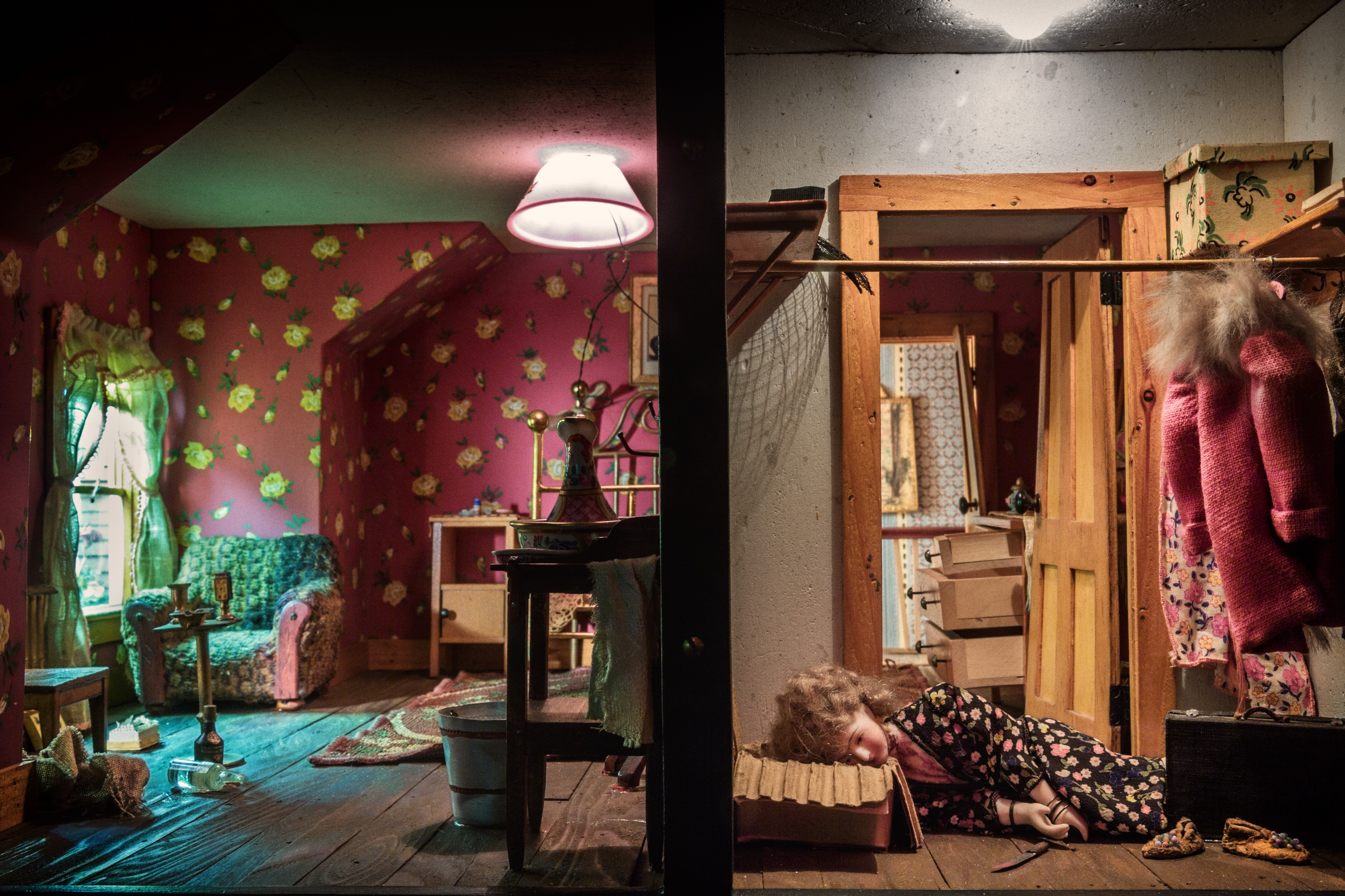
The Red Bedroom Diorama

In 1945, Glessner Lee donated her dioramas to Harvard for use in her seminars. She hosted a series of semi-annual seminars, where she presented 30 to 40 men with the "Nutshell Studies of Unexplained Death", intricately constructed dioramas of actual crime scenes, complete with working doors, windows and lights. The 20 models were based on composites of actual cases and were designed to test the abilities of students to collect all relevant evidence. The models depicted multiple causes of death and were based on autopsies and crime scenes that Glessner Lee visited.

Glessner Lee paid close attention to detail in creating the models. The rooms were filled with working mousetraps and rocking chairs, food in the kitchens, and more, and the corpses accurately represented discoloration or bloating that would be present at the crime scene. Each model cost about $3,000–$4,500 to create. Viewers were given 90 minutes to study the scene. Eighteen of the original dioramas were still used for training purposes by Harvard Associates in Police Science in 1999. As of 2020, the models could be found at the Maryland Office of the Chief Medical Examiner in Baltimore, where they were still used in the annual Frances Glessner Lee homicide investigation seminar.

For her work, Glessner Lee was made a captain in the New Hampshire State Police on October 27, 1943, making her the first woman to join the International Association of Chiefs of Police. Though some sources reported her position as honorary, in 18 Tiny Deaths by Bruce Goldfarb, New Hampshire Police Superintendent Ralph Caswell (who appointed her captain) is quoted as saying, "This was not an honorary post. She was a full-fledged captain with all the authority and responsibility of the post."

The dioramas of the crime scenes Glessner depicted were as follows: three-room dwelling, log cabin, blue bedroom, dark bathroom, burned cabin, unpapered bedroom, pink bathroom, attic, woodsman's shack, barn, saloon and jail, striped bedroom, living room, two-story porch, kitchen, garage, parsonage parlor, and bedroom. They were once part of an exhibit in the Renwick Gallery of the Smithsonian American Art Museum.

== Personal life ==
Glessner married a lawyer, Blewett Harrison Lee, who was from the family line of General Robert E. Lee, with whom she had three children. The marriage ended in divorce in 1914.

Glessner Lee's perfectionism and dioramas reflect her family background. Her father was an avid collector of fine furniture with which he furnished the family home. He wrote a book on the subject, and the family home, designed by Henry Hobson Richardson, is now the John J. Glessner House museum on the near South Side of Chicago.

The first miniature Glessner built was of the Chicago Symphony Orchestra. She did so for her mother's birthday, and it was her biggest project at the time. Glessner Lee was fond of the stories of Sherlock Holmes, whose plot twists were often the result of overlooked details. Many of her dioramas featured female victims in domestic settings, illustrating the dark side of the "feminine roles she had rehearsed in her married life."

== In popular culture ==
- The first book about Frances Glessner Lee and her dioramas, The Nutshell Studies of Unexplained Death by Corinne May Botz, was published by Monacelli Press in 2004.
- Frances Glessner Lee's biography, 18 Tiny Deaths: The Untold Story of Frances Glessner Lee and the Invention of Modern Forensics, by Bruce Goldfarb, was released by Sourcebooks on February 4, 2020.
- The Nutshell Studies of Unexplained Death provided the inspiration for the Miniature Killer in the television show CSI: Crime Scene Investigation.
- Glessner Lee is paid tribute to in the book Encyclopedia Horrifica by Joshua Gee.
- Frances Glessner Lee and Erle Stanley Gardner were friends, and he dedicated several of his detective novels to her, including The Case of the Dubious Bridegroom.
- The character of Agnes Lesser in the Father Brown episode "The Smallest of Things" is based on Glessner Lee.
- The Renwick Gallery of the Smithsonian American Art Museum exhibited 18 of the Nutshell Studies of Unexplained Death from October 20, 2017, to January 28, 2018. Sponsors included the American Academy of Forensic Sciences.
- On November 18, 2017, the film Murder in a Nutshell: The Frances Glessner Lee Story, directed by Susan Marks, premiered at the Renwick Gallery, followed by a moderated discussion with the filmmaker.
- Frances Glessner Lee's life story is told in the graphic novel Brazen: Rebel Ladies Who Rocked the World written by Pénélope Bagieu.
- Frances Glessner Lee and her pioneering work with crime scene dioramas are cited in some detail and play a crucial role in episode 17 of the 17th season of NCIS, "In a Nutshell".
- In her book Gory Details: Adventures from the Dark Side of Science, science journalist Erika Engelhaupt describes her own experience working with a team on solving the crime of one of the Nutshell dioramas and discusses Frances Glessner Lee's contribution to forensic science.
- In the fantasy mystery series The Undetectables, Courtney Smyth loosely based the character Francine Leon on Frances Glessner Lee and took inspiration from Glessner Lee's Nutshell Studies to create magical crime scene dioramas that are used by the characters to solve crimes.

== See also ==
- New Hampshire Historical Marker No. 257: Frances Glessner Lee (1878–1962) 'Mother of Forensic Science'
