= Berlin Street Railway =

The Berlin Street Railway was an electric interurban railway in the city of Berlin, New Hampshire, in the United States. It operated from 1902 to 1938.
