= Encyclopedia Horrifica =

- Author: Joshua Gee
- Language: English
- Subject: Paranormal
- Genre: Non-fiction
- Publisher: Scholastic Corporation
- Publication date: August 2007 (US)
- Publication place: United States
- Media type: Print Hardback
- Pages: 144 pp
- ISBN: 0-439-92255-0 (US)
- OCLC: 86117864
- Dewey Decimal: 001.9 22
- LC Class: BF1556 .G44 2007
- Preceded by: EnHo_000
- Followed by: EnHo_002

Encyclopedia Horrifica: The Terrifying TRUTH! About Vampires, Ghosts, Monsters, and More (also known as E.H. or EnHo_001) is a hardcover book by Joshua Gee. The book is a nonfiction reference guide exploring "hundreds of fear facts—from aliens to zombies." It also features Special Investigations in search of real-life x-files such as a haunted house in New York and P. T. Barnum's Feejee Mermaid.

In the book and on the Website, readers—usually addressed as "Fear Seekers"—have also discovered a complex hidden story about "Investigator Gee" that has spurred some debate. For example, the endpapers (inside the front and back cover) contain miniaturized scans of more than 80 pages apparently torn from the author's notebook. Similar to the opening credits of the movie Se7en, each of these notebook pages in turn reveals a new detail about Gee or the subjects covered in the book.

In May 2008, Encyclopedia Horrifica won the Children's Book Council "Book of the Year" Award.

== Critical reception ==
Reviews to date have been positive, with substantial praise devoted to the author's horror-humor writing and the book's design, which includes a holographic cover featuring a skull. Although marketed to readers as young as 8 and 9 years old, Encyclopedia Horrifica has also attracted a cult following among teen and adult sci-fi/fantasy/horror fans, receiving favorable reviews from genre publications such as Rue Morgue and Apex Digest.

== Awards ==
- Winner of the CBC Book of the Year Award
- A Bram Stoker Award for Best Non-Fiction Finalist
- A YALSA Quick Pick for Young Adults
- An NYPL Book for the Teen Age

== The EnHo System ==
According to the official Encyclopedia Horrifica website, Gees' blog on MySpace is "EnHo_000". It contained specific, paranormally-associated articles that pursued the book's topics in greater depth.

Hidden on the back cover is a sequence of letters and numbers reading "EnHo_001", usually pronounced "EN-hoe won." Clues inside the book suggest that this might mean "Encyclopedia Horrifica Book 1".

"EnHo_002" has been revealed to be Joshua Gee's new blog at FearSeekerFiles.com which is still in beta. It was suspected to be aimed at revealing secrets within the original book itself, but functioned more as a community center and trivia entertainment. The most prominent feature of the FearSeekerFiles was the message boards, bringing together a thriving community of Encyclopedia Horrifica fans. It was presented as a place to provide information about personal supernatural experiences and phenomena, and Gee would occasionally collect these into blog form.

If one looks at one of Gees' notebook pages in the book, it is revealed that Gee is planning an "EnHo_003", but it has not been revealed what this will be yet.

As of April 8, 2014, "EnHo_000" has been emptied of everything but the trailers, and the 'FearSeekerFiles' site has been taken down, although the fan forum and blog remains. It is unknown what direction Gee will take Encyclopedia Horrifica, as the author has not been available for comment.

== Dollhouse mystery scene ==
An image (and possible clue) from the Encyclopedia Horrifica trailer

For the final and most controversial chapter in the book, the author created a miniature replica of his office in order to stage his own death (or undeath, per page 128). It began as a tribute to Frances Glessner Lee, a dollhouse-making criminologist who is featured earlier in the book.

According to press materials, it took the author roughly one year to construct and photograph the dollhouse mystery scene, which contains more than 150 meticulously detailed items such as a miniature death's head moth, a grappling hook, and a tiny comlink headset. In the scene, nearly every miniature item corresponds with another fact or image in the preceding chapters. (For example, a life-sized grappling hook and comlink headset are visible on pages 72 – 73.) One inch in the scene equals one foot in real life (i.e. 1:12 scale).

On October 19, 2007, the author's official website debuted a trailer entitled "Intruder Alert". It simulates surveillance footage of the same dollhouse crime scene shown and described in the book.

== Chapters ==
Part I: Real Nightmares!

- Dracula Lives
- It Came from the Sea
- Alien Invasion
- Howling at the Moon

Part II: "That's the Spirit!"

- Beware of Ghosts
- To Catch a Ghost
- Phantoms on Film
- Permanent Pets

Part III: (Every Day Is) Halloween

- Odd Shops & Eerie Eateries
- Amazing Brain Waves
- The Black Cat's Path
- The Forbidden Bookshelf

Part IV: Fearsome Fates

- To Be or Not Zombie
- Tricked by Pixies
- The Curse of the Mummy
- Gruesome Good-Byes
