= Gory Details =

2021 book about science

Gory Details: Adventures from the Dark Side of Science
- Cover of the first edition
- Author: Erika Engelhaupt
- Illustrator: Briony Morrow-Cribbs
- Language: English
- Subject: Science, Medicine, Curiosities, and Wonders
- Genre: Non-fiction
- Publisher: National Geographic Partners
- Publication date: March 2, 2021
- Publication place: United States of America
- Pages: 336
- ISBN: 978-1-4262-2097-5
- Website: erikaengelhaupt.com/gory-details/

Gory Details: Adventures from the Dark Side of Science is a 2021 non-fiction book by American science journalist Erika Engelhaupt. It examines the more unsavory aspects of science, such as insects and death. The book was published by National Geographic Partners.

== Synopsis ==
Covering a large swath of scientific fields, such as anatomy, psychology, forensics, and entomology, Erika Engelhaupt examines “the gross, the bizarre, the taboo and morbidly fascinating elements of science.”

The book is divided into six parts, titled:

1. Morbid Curiosity
2. That's Disgusting
3. Breaking Taboos
4. Creepy Crawlies
5. Gross Anatomy
6. Mysterious Minds

Each part contains 6-8 chapters. Each individual chapter can be enjoyed as a stand-alone selection. Complex topics are made more easily accessible through black-and-white illustrations and a glow-in-the-dark cover (hardcover only).

== Background ==
Gory Details began as a blog hosted initially by Science News and later moved to National Geographic. Engelhaupt was inspired to create the blog based on books that she had read and reviewed for Science News. She wanted to write about “weird and morbid science” and “address the things that people are afraid to talk about.” She first presented the idea as a column for the magazine and was rejected, but was then offered the opportunity to write it as a blog on the Science News website.

The book contains “updated and expanded versions of some blog posts, as well as plenty of new material.” It maintains the same concept of the blog, in that it does not merely identifies “things that are gross or scary” but it teaches “something fascinating about nature and how the world works.”

== Reception ==
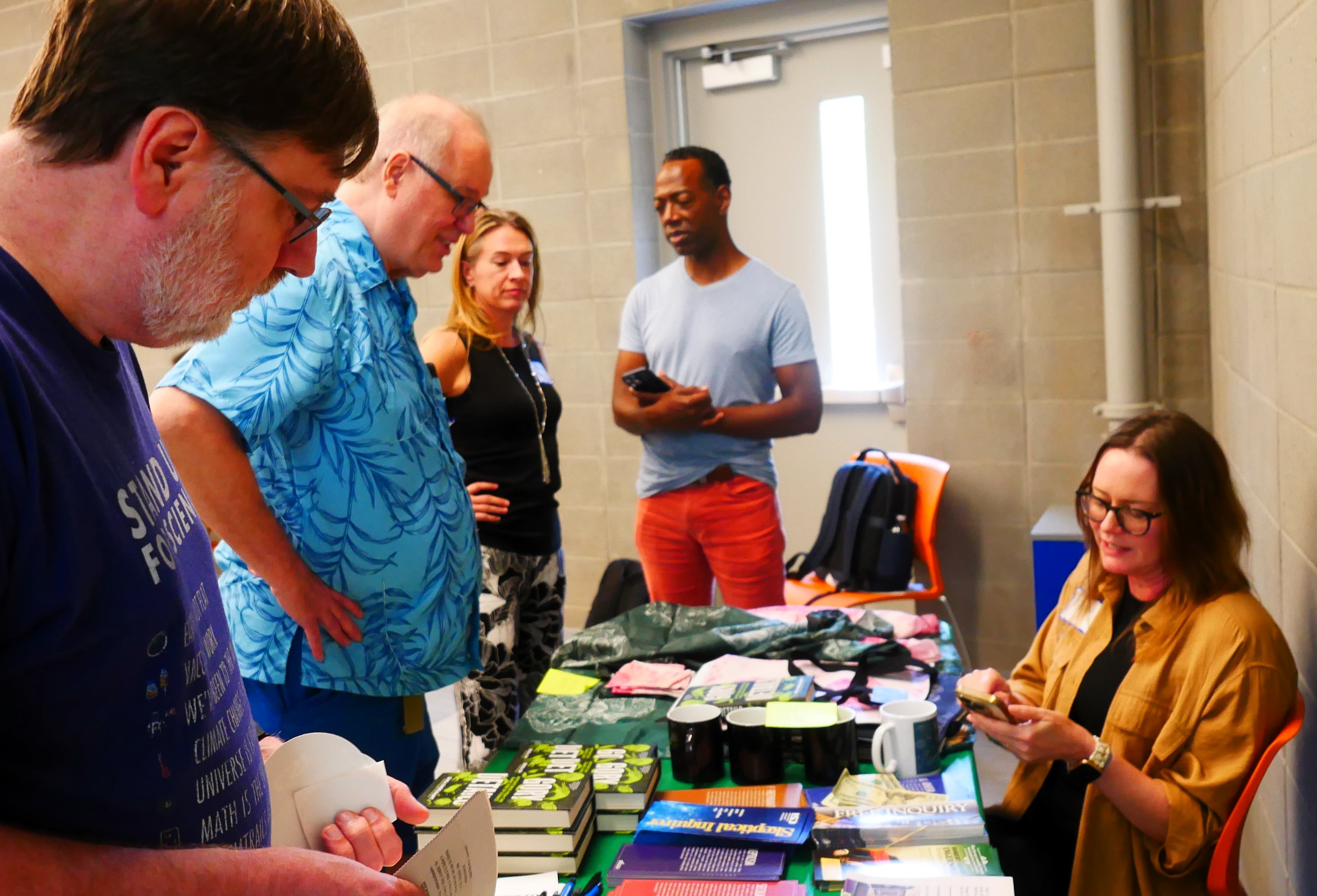
Erika Engelhaupt at book signing for Gory Details in Raleigh, NC

Library Journal called Gory Details, "a must-read for curious minds, trivia fans, and crime drama enthusiasts."

Chris Scott of the Chattanooga Times Free Press describes Gory Details as “the sort of book that leads not only to greater understanding of the world, but to a desire to know more - the unifying trait of scientists and those who are merely curious about their surroundings.” He appreciates that each “chapter is full of facts and profiles of the scientists who have discovered them or used them to benefit humanity.”

In an interview with Erika Engelhaupt, Carter Wilson of Making It Up podcast praised the author for how she “breaks it all down with humor” and how that approach “softens the whole thing”, so that “the more you learn about it, the less it comes off as gross anymore.”

Rebecca Bennett, writing for the Austin American-Statesman, finds Gory Details to be a combination of “fascinating fact, compelling descriptions and humor.” She describes Engelhaupt’s tone as casual and relatable, and the topics covered as “interesting and readable.”

Book Riot's Rachel Brittain included Gory Details on the list of "25 Must-Read Nonfiction Books" and associate editor Danika Ellis found Engelhaupt's work to be "filled to the brim with far out facts."

== Author biography ==
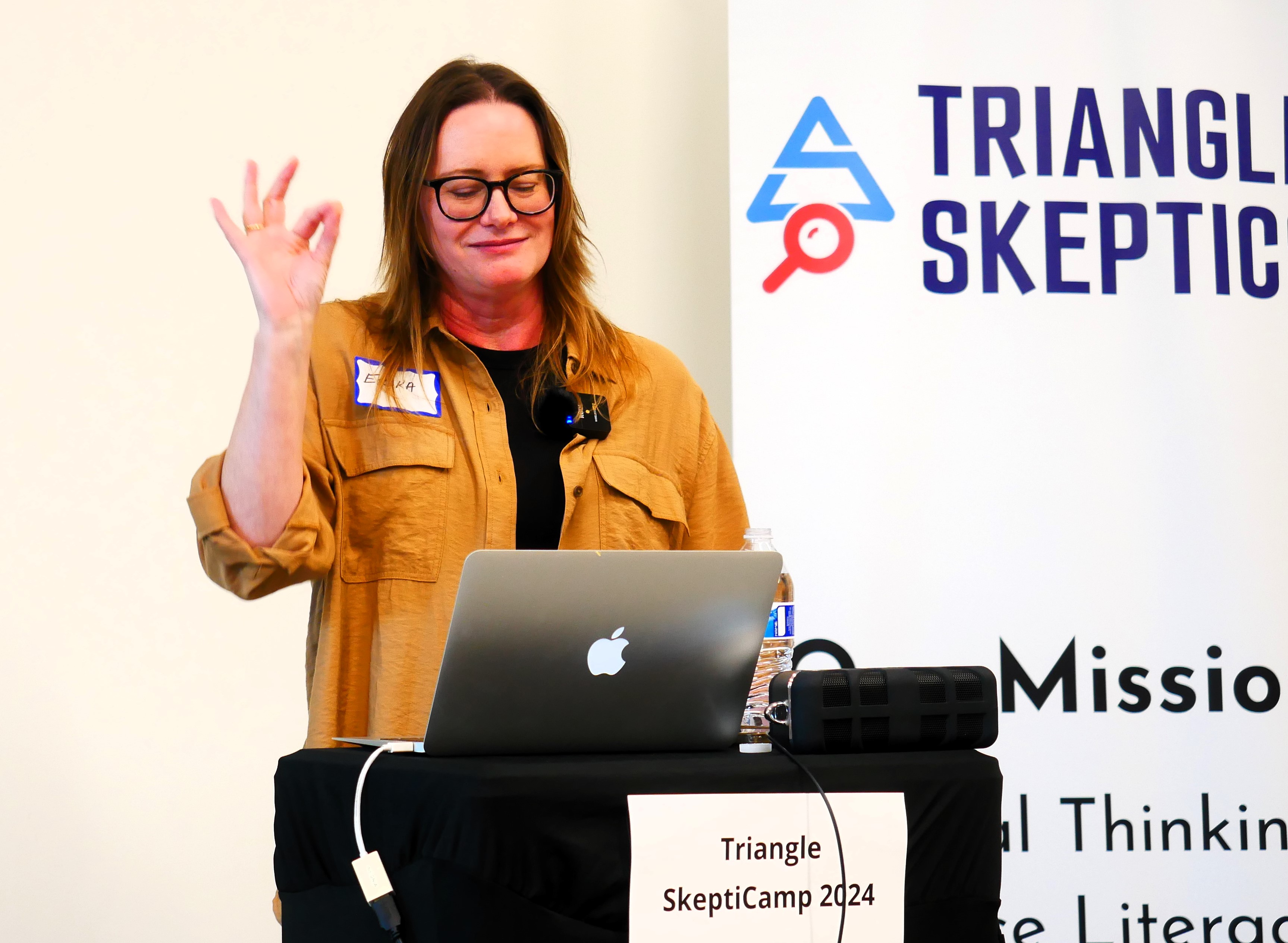
Erika Engelhaupt at Triangle SkeptiCamp 2024

Erika Engelhaupt was born in Kansas City, Missouri. She got her curiosity for science from her father who was an electrochemist. She received a Master of Science degree in biology from Tulane University and an M.S. degree in environmental studies from the University of Colorado Boulder. While pursuing a PhD in Biology at the University of Colorado Boulder, she determined that she “didn't really want to finish a whole PhD” but instead “really wanted to go straight into science writing and science journalism.”

Her work as a freelance science writer has appeared in “National Geographic, NPR, Scientific American, Popular Mechanics, Science News, The Philadelphia Inquirer, and Boulder Daily Camera.” Between 2009 and 2014, Engelhaupt was an editor at Science News and later worked as an online science editor at National Geographic. At CSICon 2023, she gave a talk titled "Disgust: How an Overlooked Emotion Meddles With Our Minds" based on content covered in Gory Details. She splits her time between Knoxville, Tennessee and Washington, DC.
