= Nutshell Studies of Unexplained Death =

Dioramas for teaching forensic science

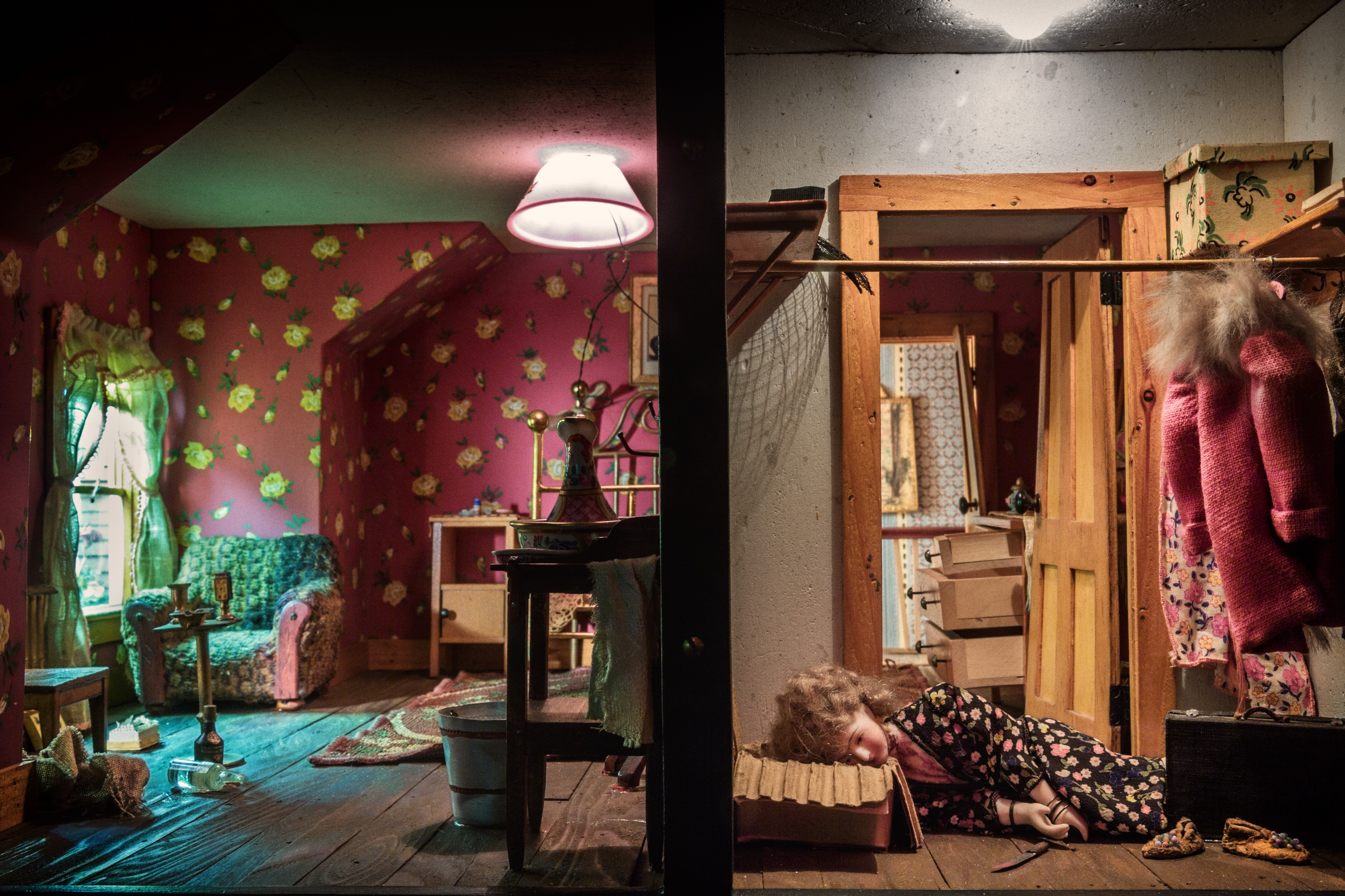
The Red Bedroom Diorama

The Nutshell Studies of Unexplained Death are a series of twenty intricately designed dollhouse-style dioramas created by Frances Glessner Lee (1878–1962), a pioneer in forensic science. Glessner Lee used her inheritance to establish a department of legal medicine at Harvard Medical School in 1936, and donated the first of the Nutshell Studies in 1946 for use in lectures on the subject of crime scene investigation. In 1966, the department was dissolved, and the dioramas went to the Maryland Medical Examiner's Office in Baltimore, Maryland, U.S. where they are on permanent loan and still used for forensic seminars.

The dioramas are detailed representations of death scenes that are composites of actual court cases, created by Glessner Lee on a 1-inch to 1 foot (1:12) scale. Originally twenty in number, each model cost about US$3,000–4,500 to create. She attended autopsies to ensure accuracy, and her attention to detail extended to having a wall calendar include the pages after the month of the incident, constructing openable windows, and wearing out-of-date clothing to obtain realistically worn fabric. The dioramas show tawdry and, in many cases, disheveled living spaces very different from Glessner Lee's own background. The dead include sex workers and victims of domestic violence.

Glessner Lee called them the Nutshell Studies because the purpose of a forensic investigation is said to be to "convict the guilty, clear the innocent, and find the truth in a nutshell." Students were instructed to study the scenes methodically—Glessner Lee suggested moving the eyes in a clockwise spiral—and draw conclusions from the visual evidence. At conferences hosted by Glessner Lee, prominent crime-scene investigators were given 90 minutes to study each diorama.

== Exhibition ==
A complete set of the dioramas was exhibited at the Renwick Gallery of the Smithsonian American Art Museum in Washington, DC from 20 October 2017 to 28 January 2018.
