= Last Orders (film) =

2001 film by Fred Schepisi

- Original poster
- Directed by: Fred Schepisi
- Written by: Fred Schepisi
- Based on: Last Orders by Graham Swift
- Produced by: Elisabeth Robinson; Fred Schepisi
- Starring: Michael Caine; Tom Courtenay; David Hemmings; Bob Hoskins; Helen Mirren; Ray Winstone
- Cinematography: Brian Tufano
- Edited by: Kate Williams
- Music by: Paul Grabowsky
- Production company: Future Films
- Distributed by: Metrodome Distribution (United Kingdom); Sony Pictures Classics (Germany; through Columbia TriStar Film Distributors International)
- Release dates: 10 September 2001 (Toronto); 7 December 2001 (US); 11 January 2002 (UK)
- Running time: 106 minutes
- Countries: United Kingdom; Germany
- Language: English
- Box office: $6.8 million

Last Orders is a 2001 drama film written and directed by Fred Schepisi. The screenplay is based on the 1996 Booker Prize-winning novel Last Orders by Graham Swift.

== Plot ==
The title refers to a pub landlord's last call and the final wishes of a dying man, in this instance Jack Dodds (Michael Caine), a south London butcher who greatly influenced four men over the course of his flawed but decent life. The quartet gathers to scatter Jack's ashes in Margate, where he had hoped to retire to a small seaside cottage with his wife Amy (Helen Mirren), a dream that was never fulfilled.

The four are: professional horse race gambler Ray Johnson (Bob Hoskins), aka Lucky, who fought beside Jack during World War II and has been his best friend since; former boxer Lenny (David Hemmings), who is always ready to settle an argument with his fists; undertaker Vic (Tom Courtenay) who acts as a buffer of sorts; and Jack's son Vince (Ray Winstone), a dealer of used luxury cars, whose relationship with his father never quite recovered when, as a young boy, he learned his real family perished in a wartime bombing and Jack and Amy took in the orphaned infant and raised him as their own.

As the quartet journeys from London by car to honour Jack's request, with stops at Canterbury Cathedral, the Chatham Naval Memorial, the hop farm where Jack and Amy met and a couple of pubs, they reminisce about their friend.

Amy is on a journey of her own to visit their daughter, June (Laura Morelli), who has learning difficulties and was institutionalized shortly after her birth fifty years earlier. Over the years Jack barely acknowledged her existence but Amy faithfully visited her weekly, even though June had no idea who she was or why she visited.

Through frequent flashbacks that stretch across six decades, the stories of the events that brought these people to this point in their lives slowly unfold, ultimately revealing the importance of friendship and love.

== Principal cast ==
- Michael Caine as Jack Dodds
  - JJ Feild as Young Jack
- Tom Courtenay as Vic Tucker
  - Cameron Fitch as Young Vic
- David Hemmings as Lenny
  - Nolan Hemmings as Young Lenny
- Bob Hoskins as Ray Johnson
  - Anatol Yusef as Young Ray
- Helen Mirren as Amy Dodds
  - Kelly Reilly as Young Amy
- Ray Winstone as Vince Dodds
  - Stephen McCole as Young Vince
- Laura Morelli as June Dodds
- George Innes as Bernie (Landlord of the Coach and Horses)

== Production ==
According to the film's official website, producer Elisabeth Robinson and screenwriter/director Fred Schepisi were preparing a feature film about Don Quixote in 1997 when she brought Graham Swift's novel to his attention. The two acquired the film rights to the book, and Schepisi began to work on his adaptation, completing the first draft of the script by February 1998. Schepisi met potential cast members and forged commitments with Michael Caine, Tom Courtenay, Bob Hoskins, and Ray Winstone.

Nik Powell, head of the independent production company Scala, signed on as an executive producer and during the summer of 2000 brought in German-based Rainer Mockert and MBP to help with the financing. Principal photography began in October of that year and lasted nine weeks. Locations included the London areas of Peckham and Bermondsey, Eastbourne, Canterbury, Chatham, Margate, and Rochester. Interiors were shot at the Pinewood Studios in Buckinghamshire.

== Release ==
The film premiered at the Toronto International Film Festival in September 2001 and was shown at the San Sebastián Film Festival, the Warsaw Film Festival, the Reykjavik Film Festival, and the London Film Festival before opening in the US on 7 December 2001. The film went into theatrical release in the UK on 11 January 2002.

The film grossed $2,329,631 in the US and $4,544,261 in foreign markets for a total worldwide box office of $6,873,892.

== Critical reception ==
On review aggregator Rotten Tomatoes, the film holds a score of 79% based on 91 reviews, with an average rating of 7/10. The website's critics consensus reads, "With a cast that includes some of the best acting talent in Britain, Last Orders is a rewarding character-driven ensemble piece." On Metacritic, the film holds a weighted average score of 78 out of 100 based on 31 critics, indicating "generally favorable reviews".

A. O. Scott of The New York Times observed, "For Mr. Schepisi . . . the principal challenge must have been how to translate the specific gravity of Mr. Swift's prose, with its multiple narrators and its stripped-down cockney lyricism, into the light and shadow of cinema . . . [He] has succeeded beyond all expectation . . . In the past Mr. Schepisi has used his elegant, unassuming visual sense and his instinctive feel for the idiosyncrasies of actors to open up the works of playwrights like David Hare (Plenty) and John Guare (Six Degrees of Separation). Last Orders, though quite different in theme and structure, shares with these films a quiet, amused wonder at the complexities of human character, and a reluctance to shoehorn them into narrative conventions or deduce obvious morals."

Edward Guthmann of the San Francisco Chronicle called the film "an enervated, overly muted drama that should have been a lot livelier, considering the terrific cast" and added, "The actors do their best, particularly the impeccable Mirren, but Schepisi draws a shroud of chaste dullness over their scenes and lays on an energy-sapping score . . . The action moves constantly between present and past, which isn't a bad narrative scheme, but when it's done so frequently and deliberately, we feel as if we're looking over Schepisi's shoulder as he diagrams the whole story for us."

Peter Travers of Rolling Stone called it "a funny and touching film" and "a bawdy delight" and commented, "The acting is of the highest order, but the magnificent Mirren . . . is the film's glory and its grieving heart."

Philip French of The Observer called the film "a moving study of the pleasures and obligations of friendship, and of facing up to a death and going on" and added, "Schepisi always handles actors sympathetically and here he has a perfect cast, most of whom can draw on their own and their parents' experiences. Without a touch of patronisation, they sink into their characters and never attempt to steal scenes from each other." Peter Bradshaw of The Guardian said, "I sometimes felt more than a little coerced by the emotion being deployed" but added, "[C]lassy is indubitably what this film is - as well as intelligent, high-minded, and touching."

Neil Smith of the BBC said "The plot may be on the mawkish side, but that doesn't stop Fred Schepisi's adaptation . . . being a gentle, affecting mix of road movie and soap opera. It helps that the Australian director has assembled a crack cast . . . Brian Tufano's handsome widescreen photography and Paul Grabowsky's excellent music turn this fairly parochial melodrama into something really rather special."

Time Out New York described it as "Sober, even elegiac in tone, and elegantly shot" and added, " At the film's heart is an attempt to suggest the extraordinary nature of ordinary people, and if it fails to achieve profundity, it still makes for one of the most rewarding and authentic depictions of/tributes to the Cockney way of life in recent years."

== Awards and nominations ==
The film won the National Board of Review Award for Best Acting by an Ensemble. Helen Mirren won the London Film Critics Circle Award for Best British Supporting Actress. Fred Schepisi was nominated for the Satellite Award for Best Adapted Screenplay and the Golden Seashell at the San Sebastián International Film Festival.
