= Half a Loaf =

Half a Loaf may refer to:

- "Half a loaf is better than no bread" (or "Half a loaf is better than none"), a proverbial phrase
- "Half a loaf", a term in bowling

== Books ==
- Half a Loaf, a 1927 book by Franklin P. Adams
- Half a Loaf, a 1997 book by Lee Mi-ae and Lee Uk-bae
- Half a Loaf; Canada's Semi-role Among Developing Countries, a 1969 book by Clyde Sanger
- "Half a Loaf", a chapter of the 1945 book Why You Lose at Bridge
- "Half a Loaf", a 1965 novelette by R. C. Fitzpatrick, nominated for the Nebula Award for Best Novelette
- "Half a Loaf", a 2014 short story by Graham Swift in England and Other Stories

== Music ==
- "1/2 a Loaf", a 1985 song by Mick Jagger from the album She's the Boss

== Television ==
- "Half a Loaf", a 1959 episode of Death Valley Days
- "Half a Loaf", a 1974 episode of Sam (1973 TV series)
- "Half a Loaf...", a 1989 episode of Tattingers

== See also ==
- Half a Loaf Is Better than None (disambiguation)
- Half a Loaf of Kung Fu, a 1978 Hong Kong martial arts film
- "Half a Loaf of Bread", a 1965 song by Jimmy Murphy (country musician)
