= Mothering Sunday (novel) =

2016 novel by English author Graham Swift

- First edition
- Author: Graham Swift
- Cover artist: Amedeo Modigliani; Nu couché (1917)
- Language: English
- Genre: Novel
- Publisher: Charles Scribner's Sons
- Publication date: 2016
- Publication place: United Kingdom
- Media type: Print
- Pages: 132
- ISBN: 1-4711-55234

Mothering Sunday was published in 2016 by English author Graham Swift, and won the Hawthornden Prize the following year. In 2021 it was adapted into a film of the same name directed by Eva Husson and starring Odessa Young, Glenda Jackson, Olivia Colman and Colin Firth.

The entire novel is set on March 30, 1924—which is when Mothering Sunday occurred that year—when a young maid, Jane Fairchild, goes to meet her lover, Paul Sheringham, who she has been having an illicit affair with for seven years and who is about to be married in a few weeks to a rich young woman in his social circle, Emma Hobday.

In 2021, the novel was adapted into a film directed by Eva Husson.

== Plot ==
On March 30, 1924, the Nivens, an upper class family who lost both their children in World War I, still observe Mothering Sunday, a day in which servants are permitted the afternoon off to return home and spend the time with their mothers. While the Nivens plan to spend the day away with their neighbours, the Sheringhams, their maid, 22-year-old Jane Fairchild, thinks about spending the afternoon on the Nivens' estate reading a book loaned to her by the Nivens. Her plans change when she receives a phone call from her lover, Paul Sheringham, inviting her to the Sheringham estate, Upleigh.

Jane and Paul have been lovers since childhood, with Paul initially paying Jane for sex and the two eventually developing a close relationship. Paul is the only surviving son between the Sheringhams and the Nivens and is thusly treated as a son by both families accordingly. He is due to marry a woman in his social circle in a few weeks and Jane wonders whether this is to be their final encounter.

After they have sex Paul dresses to go and meet his fiancée, Emma Hobday, and leaves Jane alone in the house, warning her of when his parents plan to return. Jane uses the time to wander through the house nude, examining how Paul lives. Finally leaving Paul's home she returns to the Nivens' estate, Beechwood, early planning to spend the rest of her afternoon reading. She is met by Mr. Niven who informs Jane that Paul has died in a car accident.

Jane goes on to eventually leave the Nivens to work in a bookshop in Oxford. She marries a famous philosopher and goes on to become a successful author.

Back on Mothering Sunday Mr. Niven informs Jane he has returned early to inform the maids of Upleigh that Paul has died. It is also implied that Mr. Niven is there to clean up after Paul as there is some thought he might have left behind a suicide note as his car accident was caused by his car driving directly into a tree on a route that was familiar to him. Mr. Niven asks Jane to accompany him to Upleigh where they find that Jane's counterpart, Ethel, has returned. She takes the news stoically and Jane is relieved that any signs that she was there have already been cleaned away by Ethel. On the way home Jane comforts a weeping Mr. Niven as he is devastated that all 5 of the sons of the Sheringhams and the Nivens are now deceased.

Later that night unable to sleep Jane finally continues to read her book which contains the short story Youth by Joseph Conrad. He becomes an influential writer to her, triggering the series of events that leads to her becoming a writer. Later Jane reflects on how even in her old age she keeps the secret of what happened on Mothering Sunday to herself.

== Reception ==
Hannah Beckerman, writing in The Guardian, regards the novel as perhaps being Swift's best novel yet. "Stylistically, Mothering Sunday features the restrained and yet emotive prose for which Swift is renowned...And when the story’s shocking revelation is delivered – two-thirds of the way through the novel – it is described by Swift so sparsely, so economically, that the impact is both unsettling and deeply affecting. Mothering Sunday is a powerful, philosophical and exquisitely observed novel about the lives we lead, and the parallel lives – the parallel stories – we can never know: “All the scenes. All the scenes that never occur, but wait in the wings of possibility".

James Runcie in The Independent said that "Swift is an undoubted master of detail and delay, working by a process of meditation and accumulation to create a narrative that carries far more heft than one might assume from its length...What matters is more style and impression than content: the persistence of memory and the ensuing feeling of dissociation that rises in Jane Fairchild. She starts to spend more and more time thinking and, indeed, reading, starting with Conrad's 'Youth', and this sets her on her way, finally and in much later life, to become a well-known author, the recipient of frequently asked questions at literary festivals at which she suppresses the story we are now being told."

Michiko Kakutani of The New York Times also praises the novel "it feels less self-consciously literary than Mr. Swift’s earlier novels, and while it has a haunting, ceremonious pace, it also possesses a new emotional intensity".

In NPR, Heller McAlpin explained that Mothering Sunday "builds in complexity with its layering of revelations and memories over time. More than just a story about crossing 'impossible barriers' like class and education, it is a love song to books, and to finding words, language, and a voice. It is about this remarkably self-possessed woman's ability to regard the "clean sheet" she was given at birth, free from pedigree or history, as an 'innate license to invent' — and a dead-end affair as a gateway to "untethered" possibility. It is also 'about being true to the very stuff of life' while acknowledging the fact that 'many things in life — oh so many more than we think — can never be explained at all.' It is a book you'll want to read more than once — and then urge on your friends".

Leo Robson in the Financial Times wrote, "Tension is built naturally, and significance earned page by page. By abandoning the thriller mechanics he treasured for so long, Swift has written a book that is not just his most moving and intricate but his most engrossing too."

== Film adaptation ==
In 2021, a film adaptation of Mothering Sunday was released, directed by Eva Husson and starring Odessa Young, Josh O'Connor, Olivia Colman, and Colin Firth.
