= OOTW =

OOTW may refer to:

- "Out of The Woods", 2014 song by Taylor Swift
- Operations Other Than War
- Out of This World (disambiguation)
- Outfit of the week
- Outlook on the web
