= Lambert Wilson =

French actor (born 1958)

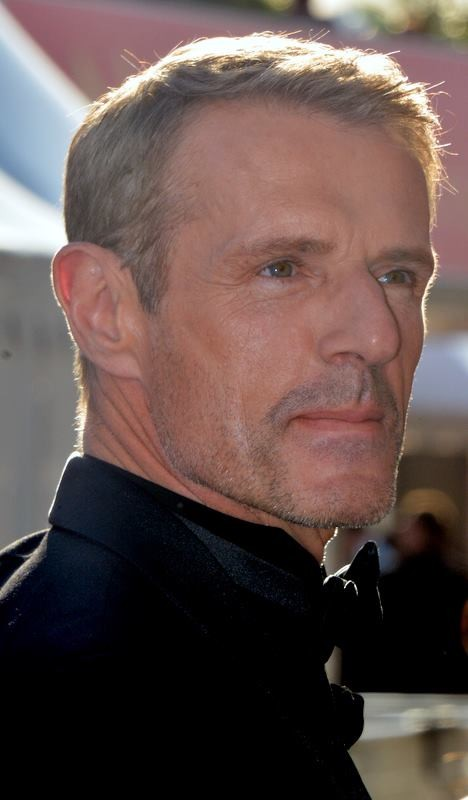
- Wilson in 2017
- Born: Lambert Nicolas Willson; 3 August 1958 (age 68); Neuilly-sur-Seine, France
- Occupation: Actor
- Years active: 1977–present
- Father: Georges Wilson

Lambert Nicolas Wilson (French: [lɑ̃bɛʁ wilsɔn]; né Willson, 3 August 1958) is a French actor. He is a seven-time César Award nominee, four for Best Actor and three for Best Supporting Actor. Internationally, he is known for playing The Merovingian in The Matrix film series, beginning with The Matrix Reloaded.

== Biography ==
=== Early life ===
Wilson is the son of Georges Wilson, who was an actor, theatrical manager and director of the Théâtre National Populaire. As a teenager, he had little interest in the French theatre and aimed to become an "American actor" and appear in Hollywood pictures. He studied acting at the Drama Centre London to learn English. He played his first movie role in the 1977 American film Julia, directed by Fred Zinnemann.

Five years later, he played his first starring role in another film by Zinneman, Five Days One Summer, opposite Sean Connery. But the film was not a commercial success, and neither was Sahara in which Wilson co-starred with Brooke Shields. Wilson ultimately found success in his home country: during the 1980s, he became popular with French audiences by appearing in successful films such as La Boum 2, The Public Woman and Rendez-vous. At the time, he was often cast either as tormented characters or in romantic parts, although he found himself more convincing in the former kind of roles.

Wilson screen tested for The Living Daylights (1987) for the role of James Bond, appearing in test footage opposite Maryam d'Abo (the Bond girl in The Living Daylights) as Tatiana Romanova, re-enacting scenes from From Russia with Love (1963). In 1991, Wilson was featured in a series of Calvin Klein ads for its Eternity perfume brand, featuring Christy Turlington, reuniting for a poster ad in 1998.

=== Career ===
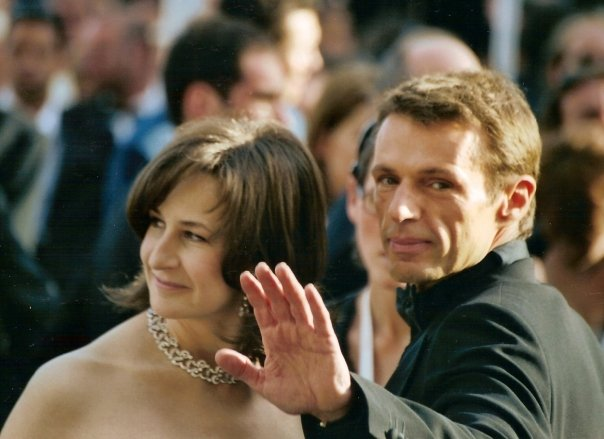
Valérie Lemercier and Lambert Wilson at the 2005 Cannes Film Festival

In musical theatre Wilson has appeared as Count Carl-Magnus Malcolm in the 1995 National Theatre London production of A Little Night Music, where "every word and note was fiercely projected", and of which a recording was later issued. In 2007 he was Voltaire/Pangloss (bilingually) in Robert Carsen's production of Candide at the Théâtre du Châtelet in Paris. He appeared as Eric Thomson in Resnais's 2003 film version of the 1925 comédie musicale Pas sur la bouche by Yvain.

Wilson released Musicals on the EMI label in 1989 (re-issued in 2004), with John McGlinn conducting Orchestre Philharmonique de Monte-Carlo. It features him singing songs of the American Musical Theatre catalogue, those well-known ("Maria" from West Side Story, "There But For You Go I" from Lerner & Loewe's Brigadoon, "The Cafe Song" from Les Misérables, "Johanna" from Stephen Sondheim's Sweeney Todd), rare ("Love Song" from Kurt Weill and Alan Jay Lerner's Love Life, "It Must Be So" from Leonard Bernstein's Candide, and "Silly People", which was cut from Sondheim's A Little Night Music), and those in-between ("Finishing the Hat" from Sunday in the Park with George, "You Do Something to Me" from Cole Porter's Fifty Million Frenchmen, "Never Will I Marry" from Frank Loesser's Greenwillow).

He has directed stage presentations of Alfred de Musset's Les Caprices de Marianne starring Laure Marsac at Paris' Bouffes du Nord as well as Jean Racine's Bérénice starring Kristin Scott Thomas and Didier Sandre at Avignon and then Chaillot.

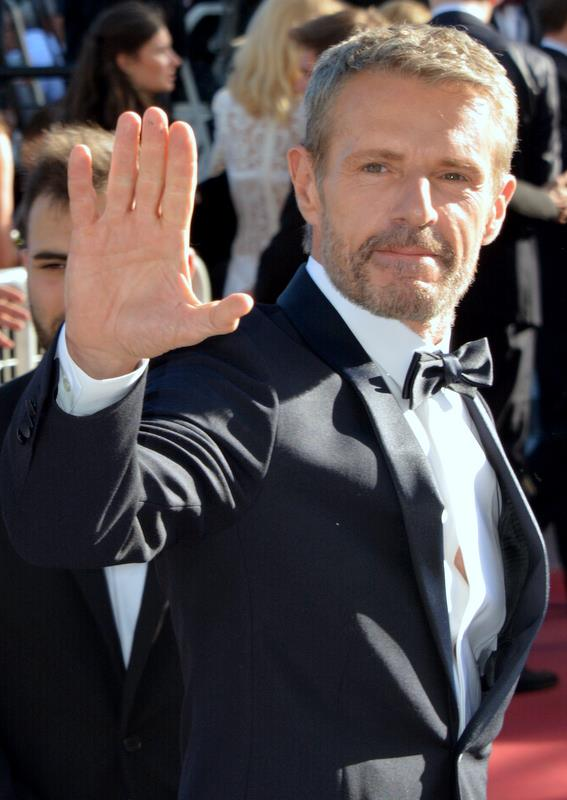
Wilson at the 2016 Cannes Film Festival

In 1989, his performance as Abbé Pierre in the film Hiver 54, l'abbé Pierre, for which he received the Jean Gabin prize, won him critical accolades. In the late 1980s and early 1990s, however, his screen career suffered from a series of box office failures, such as The Possessed and El Dorado.

He later said that the French producers had come, at the time, to regard him as "box office poison". He eventually won back the favour of French audiences by appearing in the successful comedies Same Old Song (1997) and Jet Set (2000).

Wilson was cast in the role of The Merovingian in The Matrix Reloaded (2002) and The Matrix Revolutions (2003), perhaps his best-known role in the American cinema. Being completely fluent in English, his strong French accent in the film is fabricated for the role. The role also popularised the Ediety tie knot, now commonly referred to as "The Merovingian".

=== Recent years ===
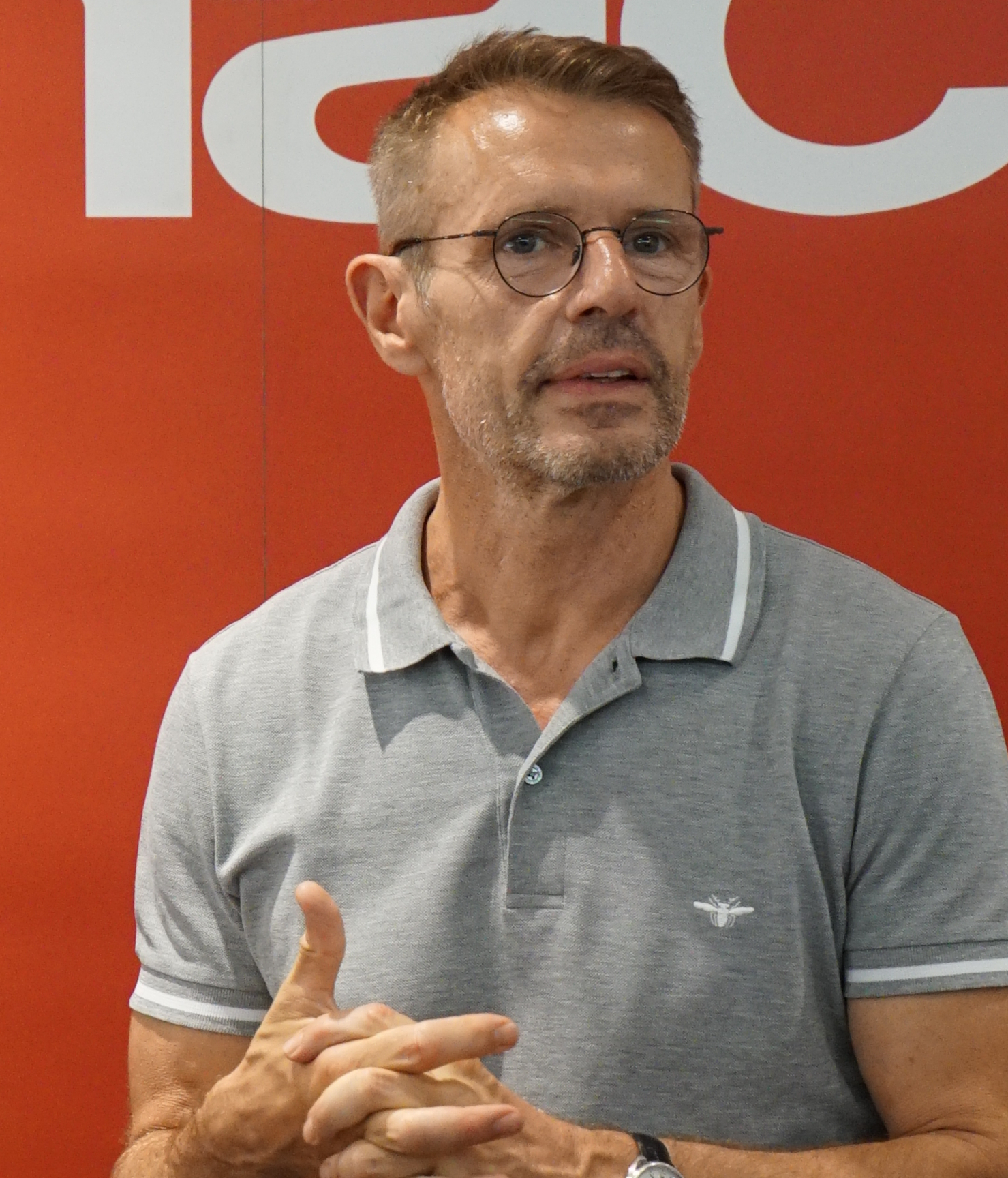
Wilson in 2017

In November 2012, he was selected as a member of the main competition jury at the 2012 International Film Festival of Marrakech. In April 2013, Wilson was invited by MINUSTAH (United Nations Stabilization Mission in Haiti) to visit Haiti in the capacity of helping with various UN-backed environment and cultural programmes.

He was the master of ceremonies for the opening and closing ceremonies of the 2014 and 2015 Cannes Film Festival.

In February 2016, he released a tribute album called Wilson chante Montand to the singer Yves Montand to commemorate the 25th anniversary of the death of the artist. Among the 17 tracks on the album there is Mais qu’est-ce que j’ai ? which was composed by Henri Betti with the lyrics by Édith Piaf in 1947. The musical arrangements of the 17 songs were made by Bruno Fontaine. Also in 2016, he portrayed Jacques Cousteau in the biopic The Odyssey.

Wilson's commitment to safeguarding the environment is manifest in his support of Greenpeace and Agir pour l'Environnement amongst others. He works on behalf of the Fondation Abbé-Pierre and the Mouvement Emmaüs in France to eradicate hunger and poverty. Wilson is an ambassador for Les Toiles Enchantées (an association that brings contemporary cinema to hospitals and hospices for children), and parrain (patron) for a proposed new cinema at the Institut Français in London.

Wilson is Chevalier and Officier des Arts et des Lettres and Chevalier and Officier de l'Ordre National du Mérite. He was raised to Commandeur de l’Ordre du Mérite by President Emmanuel Macron in 2017.

In January 2018 he engaged to assist the Food and Agriculture Organisation of the United Nations (FAO) in communications regarding work to eradicate world hunger and poverty ("Working for Zero Hunger"). The same year he starred in Volontaire by Hélène Fillières.

In 2021, Wilson reprised his role of the Merovingian from The Matrix franchise in The Matrix Resurrections.

== Filmography ==
Key
†	Denotes works that have not yet been released

=== Film ===
Year	Title	Role	Language	Director	Notes
1977	Julia	Walter Franz	English	Fred Zinnemann	
1979	The Gendarme and the Extra-Terrestrials	An alien	French	Jean Girault	
1979	New Generation	Jean-Charles	French	Jean-Pierre Lowf Legoff	
1979	Lady Oscar	Cocky soldier	English	Jacques Demy	
1979	From Hell to Victory	Patrice	English	Umberto Lenzi	
1981	Chanel Solitaire		English	George Kaczender	
1982	Five Days One Summer	Johann Biari	English	Fred Zinnemann	
1982	La Boum 2	Félix Maréchal	French	Claude Pinoteau	
1983	Sahara	Sheikh Ahmed Al Jaffar	English	Andrew V. McLaglen	
1984	The Blood of Others	Paul	English	Claude Chabrol	
1984	The Public Woman	Milan Mliska	French	Andrzej Żuławski	Nominated: César Award for Best Supporting Actor
1985	Rendez-vous	Quentin	French	André Téchiné	Nominated: César Award for Best Actor
1985	L'Homme aux yeux d'argent	Villain	French	Pierre Granier-Deferre	
1985	Red Kiss	Stéphane	French	Véra Belmont	
1986	Bleu comme l'enfer	Ned	French	Yves Boisset	
1986	Corps et biens	Michel Sauvage	French	Benoît Jacquot	
1987	The Belly of an Architect	Caspasian Speckler	English	Peter Greenaway	
1988	The Possessed	Nikolaj Stavrogin	French	Andrzej Wajda	
1988	Chouans!	Tarquin Larmor	French	Philippe de Broca	
1988	El Dorado	Pedro de Ursúa	Spanish	Carlos Saura	
1989	La Vouivre	Arsène Muselier	French	Georges Wilson	
1989	Suivez cet avion	Rémi Cerneaux	French	Patrice Ambard	
1989	Hiver 54, l'abbé Pierre	Abbé Pierre	French	Denis Amar	Nominated: César Award for Best Actor; Won – Prix Jean Gabin
1991	Un homme et deux femmes	Doctor Paul Baudoin	French	Valérie Stroh	
1991	Shuttlecock	John Prentis	English	Andrew Piddington	
1992	Warsaw – Year 5703	Alek	French	Janusz Kijowski	
1993	L'Instinct de l'ange	Henry	French	Richard Dembo	
1995	Jefferson in Paris	Marquis de Lafayette	English	James Ivory	
1996	Unpredictable Nature of the River	Monsieur de la Malène	French	Bernard Giraudeau	
1996	The Leading Man	Felix Webb	English	John Duigan	
1997	Marquise	Jean Racine	French	Véra Belmont	
1997	Same Old Song	Marc Duveyrier	French	Alain Resnais	Nominated: César Award for Best Supporting Actor
1998	Too Much (Little) Love	Paul	French	Jacques Doillon	
1999	The Last September	Hugo Montmorency	English	Deborah Warner	
2000	Jet Set	Arthus de Poulignac	French	Fabien Onteniente	Nominated: César Award for Best Supporting Actor
2000	Love Torn in a Dream	Sebatol	French	Raúl Ruiz	
2001	HS – hors service	Francis	French	Jean-Paul Lilienfeld	
2001	Far from China	Jean-Pierre	French	C. S. Leigh	
2002	Les tombales	Joseph	French	Christophe Barratier	Short film
2003	It's Easier for a Camel...	Aurelio	French	Valeria Bruni Tedeschi	
2003	The Matrix Reloaded	The Merovingian	English	The Wachowskis	
2003	Dédales	Brennac	French	René Manzor	
2003	The Matrix Revolutions	The Merovingian	English	The Wachowskis	
2003	Timeline	Lord Arnaut	English	Richard Donner	
2003	Not on the Lips	Eric Thomson	French	Alain Resnais	
2004	People	Brother Arthus	French	Fabien Onteniente	
2004	Catwoman	George Hedare	English	Pitof	Nominated: Razzie Award for Worst Supporting Actor
2005	Sahara	Yves Massarde	English	Breck Eisner	
2005	Good Girl	Philippe	French	Sophie Fillières	
2005	L'Anniversaire	Raphaël	French	Diane Kurys	
2005	Palais royal!	Prince Arnaud	French	Valérie Lemercier	
2006	Private Fears in Public Places	Dan	French	Alain Resnais	Nominated: Lumière Award for Best Actor
2007	Flawless	Finch	English	Michael Radford	
2007	Go West! A Lucky Luke Adventure	Lucky Luke (voice)	French	Olivier Jean-Marie	
2008	Dante 01	Saint-Georges	French	Marc Caro	
2008	The Great Alibi	Pierre Collier	French	Pascal Bonitzer	
2008	Comme les autres	Emmanuel François Xavier Bernier	French	Vincent Garenq	
2008	Babylon A.D.	Dr. Arthur Darquandier	English	Mathieu Kassovitz	
2008	The Lazarus Project	Avery	English	John Glenn	
2009	Victor	Jérôme Courcelle	French	Thomas Gilou	
2010	Imogène McCarthery	Samuel Tyler	French	Alexandre Charlot; Franck Magnier	
2010	The Princess of Montpensier	François de Chabannes	French	Bertrand Tavernier	
2010	Of Gods and Men	Christian	French	Xavier Beauvois	Nominated: César Award for Best Actor
2012	Blind Man	Narvik	French	Xavier Palud	
2012	HOUBA! On the Trail of the Marsupilami	General Pochero	French	Alain Chabat	
2012	You Ain't Seen Nothin' Yet	Lambert Wilson	French	Alain Resnais	
2012	Ernest & Celestine	Ernest (voice)	French	Stéphane Aubier; Vincent Patar; Benjamin Renner	
2013	Bicycling with Molière	Gauthier Valence	French	Philippe Le Guay	
2013	ReWined	The Professor	Italian	Ferdinando Vicentini Orgnani	
2014	Barbecue	Antoine Chevalier	French	Éric Lavaine	
2014	5 to 7	Valéry Pierpont	English	Victor Levin	
2014	The Nostalgist	The Man	English	Giacomo Cimini	Short film
2014	Posthumous	Daniel S. Volpe	English	Lulu Wang	
2015	Suite Française	Viscount de Montmort	English	Saul Dibb	
2015	Sins of a Father	John	English	Andrew Piddington	
2015	Rabid Dogs	The Father	French	Éric Hannezo	
2016	The Odyssey	Jacques-Yves Cousteau	French	Jérôme Salle	Nominated: Globes de Cristal Award for Best Actor
2016	One Man and His Cow	Philippe	French	Mohamed Hamidi	
2016	The Jungle Book	Baloo (voice)	English	Jon Favreau	French dub
2016	Tout de suite maintenant	Barsac	French	Pascal Bonitzer	
2016	The Confessions	Roché's lover	Italian	Roberto Andò	
2016	Solo	Michel	Italian	Laura Morante	
2017	Baby Bumps	Marc	French	Noémie Saglio	
2017	Corporate	Stéphane Froncart	French	Nicolas Silhol	
2017	The Royal Exchange	Philippe V	French	Marc Dugain	
2017	L'Empereur	Narrator	French	Luc Jacquet	Nature documentary film
2018	Au bout des doigts (In Your Hands)	Pierre Geithner	French	Ludovic Bernard	
2018	Volontaire	Rivière	French	Hélène Fillières	
2019	The Translators	Éric Angstrom	French	Régis Roinsard	
2020	De Gaulle	Charles de Gaulle	French	Gabriel Le Bomin	Nominated: César Award for Best Actor
2021	Benedetta	The Nuncio	French	Paul Verhoeven	
2021	The Matrix Resurrections	The Merovingian	English	Lana Wachowski	
2022	Mrs. Harris Goes to Paris	Marquis de Chassagne	English	Anthony Fabian	
2022	Ernest & Celestine: A Trip to Gibberitia	Ernest (voice)	French	Julien Chheng; Jean-Christophe Roger	
2023	A Great Friend	Vincent Delcour	French	Éric Besnard	
2025	Chopin, a Sonata in Paris	Louis Philippe I	Polish, French, Spanish	Michał Kwieciński	
TBA	The Bitter End †		English	Mike Newell	

=== Television ===
Year	Title	Role	Language	Director	Notes
1978	Gaston Phébus	Yvain	French	Bernard Borderie	6 episodes
1980	Cinéma 16: Les filles d'Adam	Gilbert	French	Éric Le Hung	TV film
1980	Au feu le préfet	Patrick Callaghan	French	Alain Boudet	TV film
1980	L'Inconnue d'Arras	The grandfather	French	Raymond Rouleau	TV film
1981	Quatre femmes, quatre vies: La Maison bleue	Jean-Paul Taillandier	French	Robert Mazoyer	TV film
1981	La dernière nuit	The assistant executioner	French	Didier Decoin	TV film
1981	Histoire contemporaine	Henri de Brèce	French	Michel Boisrond	Miniseries
1982	The Trojan War Will Not Take Place	Paris	French	Raymond Rouleau	TV film
1983	La Caravane	Éric	French	Roger Gillioz	TV film
1986	La Storia	Carlo Vivaldi / Davide Segre	Italian	Luigi Comencini	TV film
1992	Strangers	The Guy	English	Joan Tewkesbury	TV film
1992	Frankenstein	Dr. Henry Clerval	English	David Wickes	TV film
1994	Une qui promet	Ferdinand	French	Marianne Lamour	TV film
1994	Les Caprices de Marianne	Octave	French	Jean-Daniel Verhaeghe	TV film
1994	Rage and Outrage: The Dreyfus Affair	Drumont	French	Raoul Sangla	TV film
1995	Pour une vie ou deux	Noël Gregorio	French	Marc Angelo	TV film
1996	Le Secret d'Iris	Pierrot	French	Élisabeth Rappeneau	TV film
1997	Quand le chat sourit		French	Sabine Azéma	TV film
2000	Don Quixote	Duke	English	Peter Yates	TV film
2001	Le divin enfant	Father Marc Aubray	French	Stéphane Clavier	TV film
2004	Colette, une femme libre	Henry de Jouvenel	French	Nadine Trintignant	Miniseries; 2 episodes
2009	The Philanthropist	Yves Moehringer	English	Duane Clark	Episode: "Paris"
2012	The Hollow Crown	Charles, King of France	English	Thea Sharrock	Episode: "Henry V"
2013	Manipulations	Franck Barrot	French	Laurent Herbiet	TV film Nominated: Monte-Carlo Television Festival, Best Performance by an Actor
2022	Totems	Charles Contignet	French	Frédéric Jardin; Jérôme Salle; Antoine Blossier	Amazon TV Series
2023	Star Wars: Visions	Jon (voice)	English	Julien Chheng	Episode: "The Spy Dancer"
2024	La Maison	Vincent Ledu	French	Fabrice Gobert; Daniel Grou	Apple TV+ series - main role
2026–present	Harry Potter †	Nicolas Flamel	English	TBA	HBO series - recurring role

=== Video games ===
Year	Title	Role	Language	Director	Notes
2003	Enter the Matrix	The Merovingian	English	The Wachowskis	Voice role
2005	The Matrix Online	The Merovingian	English	The Wachowskis	Voice role
