= Elizabeth Robinson (disambiguation) =

Elizabeth Robinson (born 1961) is an American poet.

Elizabeth Robinson may also refer to:

- Elizabeth Montagu (née Robinson, 1718–1800), British social reformer, arts patron, literary critic and writer
- Elizabeth Robinson Abbott (née Robinson, 1852–1926), American educator
- Elizabeth G. Robinson (1899–1960), Canadian politician, member of the Legislative Assembly of Alberta
- Betty Robinson (1911–1999), American runner

== See also ==
- Elisabeth Robinson, American novelist
- Elisabeth Robinson Scovil (1849–1934), Canadian nurse and writer
