= Tomorrow (novel) =

2007 novel by Graham Swift

- First edition
- Author: Graham Swift
- Cover artist: Getty Images
- Language: English
- Publisher: Picador
- Publication date: 2007
- Publication place: England
- Media type: Print (hardcover)
- Pages: 248 pp
- ISBN: 978-0-330-45018-8
- OCLC: 77012255
- Dewey Decimal: 823/.914 22
- LC Class: PR6069.W47 T66 2007b

Tomorrow is a novel by Graham Swift first published in 2007 about the impending disclosure of a family secret. The novel takes the form of an interior monologue by a 49-year-old mother addressed to her sleeping teenage children.

== Plot summary ==
Mike Hook is a wartime child. His father, "Grandpa Pete," and his mother, "Grandma Helen," both hardly turned 20, hastily get married in 1944 just before Pete rejoins the RAF to fight in the Second World War. He is shot down over Germany, survives, and spends several months in a prisoner-of-war camp. In January 1945, while he is still away from home, his son Mike is born.

After the war and his safe return to England, Pete becomes a successful entrepreneur. Mike, who remains an only child, develops an interest in nature quite early in life and eventually, in the 1960s, decides to read Biology at the recently opened University of Sussex. There, in 1966, he meets Paula Campbell, who has come from London to study English Literature and Art, and their relationship soon turns out to be much more than just a fling.

Paula is the only child of a divorced High Court judge with Scottish roots. That man, "Grandpa Dougie," born shortly after the turn of the century, contributes to the war effort by deciphering code somewhere in the English countryside. There, already in his mid-forties, he falls for Fiona McKay, a young secretary with pretty legs who is twenty years his junior, and marries her. Paula, also born in 1945, is sent to a girls' boarding school. Already during her years at school Paula feels her father's growing estrangement from his wife, a development which culminates in divorce and "Grandma Fiona" running off with a man her own age "dripping with some kind of oil-derived, Texan-Aberdonian wealth". After that, Paula hardly ever sees or talks to her own mother again. Just as Mike, she remains an only child. After finishing school, she decides to go on to Sussex University.

In tune with the spirit of the age, both Mike and Paula adopt a promiscuous lifestyle during their student days. However, they realise immediately after their first meeting that they are meant for each other and, deeply in love, decide to become monogamous and to spend the rest of their lives together. They get married in 1970 at the age of 25 and gradually start pursuing their respective careers—Mike as the editor of a struggling science journal, Paula as an art dealer.

In 1972, Paula eventually goes off the pill as they both wish to have children. When Paula does not become pregnant, the couple decide to have themselves tested.

Mike's diagnosed infertility prompts them to remain childless (rather than try to adopt children) and to stay together, Paula suppressing the biological urge to procreate and look for a different partner. However, they decide not to inform anybody of the new situation, not even their own parents, who in turn never broach so delicate a subject with their children and just wait passively for the big announcement. In the meantime, when a neighbour offers them a cat they take her up on it and call him Otis, after recently deceased Otis Redding. Otis becomes the focal point of their married life, so much so that when Paula takes him to the vet she is bluntly told that Otis is their "child substitute".

The vet becomes Paula's confidant (and lover, but just for one night), and he advises her to reconsider her abandoned wish to have a child while pointing her to the options available to her through the fledgling field of reproductive medicine.

In the end Mike and Paula make up their minds to give it a try, Paula is artificially inseminated, and in 1979, after her own father's and Otis's death, gives birth to twins whom they christen Nick and Kate. Again, they do not tell anybody about how their children were conceived, especially not that their natural father is "Mr S", an anonymous sperm donor.

== Reviews ==
Tomorrow was released in the spring of 2007 to mostly unfavourable reviews. In particular, critics noted that Swift had employed a narrative technique similar to that of his successful 2003 novel, The Light of Day, but that the Fabula and syuzhet of Tomorrow did not lend itself to the kind of narrative used by Swift.

For example, Adam Mars-Jones focuses on Swift's holding back vital information from the reader so that at any given point in the novel they want to know "not what will happen next but what has happened in the first place". This, Mars-Jones argues, worked very well in The Light of Day but fails utterly in Tomorrow: "If you're going to withhold a secret for many pages, it had better deliver a frisson when it comes. In practice this means that it must concern sex or death, and preferably both." However, "the secret is ordinary and wouldn't merit airtime on the most timidly confrontational reality show."

What is more, Mars-Jones detects a cruel streak in Paula, something which was obviously not intended by Swift. No loving mother would keep her almost grown-up children in the dark for 150 pages (the equivalent of several hours of continual talk full of foreboding) and only then divulge the real reason for their unusual meeting: "This would be a sadistic scenario if it was possible to take it seriously. The disproportion between the slim story and its overcontrolled telling is [...] on a par with buying a tank to mow the lawn."

Lionel Shriver, who has "never had the privilege of reviewing a Graham Swift novel before, and I'm a fan", admits that "now I finally get my mitts on a Swift, and I hate it." About the character of Paula, Shriver deplores that the "apologetic, alternatingly gushy and beseeching style seems artificially female—like a man's idea of a woman's voice. This is disconcerting, since Swift has crafted persuasive female characters before. But Paula is female with such a vengeance that she borders on parody. This woman is dull, trying, and signally incapable of ponying up the sharp lines and insightful asides that make a novel enjoyable along the way. Maybe we should let her keep her secret."

In the same vein, Carol Birch, calling the book "a disappointment," notes that Tomorrow "hangs on the device of a secret about to be disclosed, blazed before us from the outset as potentially life-shattering, and trailed like a banner. When it comes, the revelation feels a bit of a cheat: what you'd guessed at, only dismissed as too obvious." As we are told by Paula at one point in the novel that her husband Mike is "like a man finding it in him to sleep on the eve of his execution", Birch surmises that "perhaps he sleeps so soundly because there really is nothing too much to worry about."

Birch claims that teenage children would wince at the kind of confession Paula is about to make: "It's toe-curling, too, when she regales them with how wonderful sex is for her and their dad. 'I have to confess it, a great lust for your father, for your father's body,' for this man with whom 'I made the tenderest of sweetest love just two hours ago.' Believe me, Paula, your 16-year-olds don't wish to know this."

Only Anne Enright goes a step further and says that, once the secret is out of the bag, "we are free to stop guessing and start enjoying the novel's more delicate truths" as the book "weaves and undoes its quiet magic, making and scattering different kinds of 'family' [...] This is part of Swift's overwhelming honesty as a writer: he writes the way that life goes. He describes a married couple who are well off, content in their working lives and still ardent in bed. The world must contain many such people, though fiction does not—as though happiness were the most inadmissible secret of all."

John Crace has condensed the novel into 700 words in his column, "The Digested Read" ("The digested read, digested: Either she takes the Mogadon or I do.").

== Read on ==
- Siri Hustvedt's The Sorrows of an American (2008), where another family secret which is neither surprising nor satisfying is uncovered.
