= The Light of Day =

The Light of Day metaphorically refers to daylight.

The Light of Day or Light of Day may also refer to:

- Light of Day, a 1987 film starring Michael J. Fox and Joan Jett
  - "Light of Day" (song), the title song from the film, written by Bruce Springsteen
- The Light of Day (Eric Ambler novel), a 1962 novel by Eric Ambler
- The Light of Day (Graham Swift novel), a 2003 novel by Graham Swift
- "The Light of Day", a song by Jakszyk, Fripp and Collins, from their only album, A Scarcity of Miracles

== See also ==
- The Light of Days, a nonfiction book by Judy Batalion
- The Light of Other Days, a 2000 science fiction novel by Arthur C. Clarke and Stephen Baxter
- Light of Dawn, a 2014 album by Unisonic
