= Wish You Were Here (Swift novel) =

2011 novel by Graham Swift

- Author: Graham Swift
- Cover artist: Keenan
- Language: English
- Publisher: Picador
- Publication date: 2011
- Publication place: United Kingdom
- Media type: Print
- Pages: 352
- ISBN: 978-0330-53583-0
- Preceded by: Making an Elephant: Writing from Within
- Followed by: England and Other Stories

Wish You Were Here is a novel by English writer Graham Swift, first published in 2011.

== Synopsis ==
This is a novel about the changing face of rural England. It is narrated by the last of a long line of West Country farmers who now (in 2004) runs a caravan park on the Isle of Wight with his childhood sweetheart, the daughter of a neighbouring farmer. As Jack Luxton travels to collect the body of his brother, repatriated from the war in Iraq, and take it to the family burial plot in North Devon, he relates the history of the Luxton family and their traditional professions of farming and military service. Alongside this he tells the story of the near demise of dairy farming in England, through the twin catastrophes of BSE in 1996 and the foot and mouth disease in 2001. Added to this is the increasingly common and equally disastrous disease of wealthy city dwellers buying second homes in rural areas, thus disrupting traditional village life and making it too expensive for locals to stay in their natural communities.

== Reception ==
Boyd Tonkin described it as "quietly commanding". Rosemary Goring – writing in The Herald – described it as "cruelly absent from any prize list" that followed.
