= The Sweet-Shop Owner =

1980 novel by Graham Swift

- First edition
- Author: Graham Swift
- Language: English
- Publisher: Allen Lane
- Publication date: August 1980
- Publication place: United Kingdom
- Media type: Print
- Pages: 221
- ISBN: 0-7139-1247-2

The Sweet-Shop Owner is the debut novel of English author Graham Swift. It was published in 1980 to largely favourable reviews.

== Plot introduction ==
The book is set on a sunny Friday in June 1974 and describes the routine of what turns out to be the last day in the life of Willy Chapman, the eponymous owner of a South London sweet shop. Central to the book is his relationship with his beautiful and yet distant wife Irene who bore him a daughter on the unspoken agreement that no love would be expressed between them. Interspersed with flashbacks to his earlier life, Willy attempts to justify himself to his estranged unforgiving daughter Dorry via an internal monologue.

== Reception ==
- "It might be thought that at moments there is something too writerly about Mr. Chapman's monologue," noted the New Statesman, "spoiling its potential pathos with a too poetic or designed articulacy. Even so his final walk across the common on a hot summer day, in excruciating pain from angina, is masterly; intercut with the recollection of a mile race he won at school, the experience is both exciting and deeply poignant."
- Michael Gorra of The New York Times criticizes the novel for leaving Irene and Dorry's motives obscure but despite this concludes "The Sweet-Shop Owner is on the whole a remarkable novel - remarkable for its evocation of the catch in the throat of fatherhood, for the sharp comedy with which Mr. Swift describes the bickering of Willy's shop assistants, above all for the skill behind Mr. Swift's ambitious account of the changes time brings to the street where Willy has his shop, to the greengrocer across the way, the barber, the real-estate agent. There is a touch of Joyce in Graham Swift's revelation of the hidden poetry of small men's lives, and The Sweet-Shop Owner joins Waterland in establishing him as one of the brightest promises the English novel has now to offer.

== Publication history ==
- 1980, UK, Allan Lane, ISBN 0-7139-1247-2, Pub date Aug 1980, Hardback
- 1985, US, Washington Square Press, ISBN 0-671-54611-2, Pub date Jun 1985, Paperback
- 2011, US, Audiobooks, ISBN 0792780922, Pub date Nov 2011, Audio CD, read by James Wilby
