= The Fall (1999 film) =

- Directed by: Andrew Piddington
- Written by: Mike Walker
- Produced by: Stephen Alix; László Helle; Nigel Thomas; Peter Watson-Wood
- Starring: Craig Sheffer; László Borbély; Antal Cserna; Anita Deutsch; Hélène de Fougerolles; Soo Garay; Kathleen Gati; Zoltán Gera; Kim Huffman; Ibolya Kotilla; Ági Margittay
- Cinematography: Tamás Sas
- Edited by: Jon Costelloe
- Music by: Fred Mollin
- Release date: 1999
- Running time: 94 minutes
- Countries: Canada; Hungary; United Kingdom
- Languages: English; Hungarian

The Fall is a 1999 thriller film written by Mike Walker and directed by Andrew Piddington.

== Cast ==
- Craig Sheffer as Adam Ellis
- László Borbély as John
- Antal Cserna as Zoltánn Szabó
- Anita Deutsch as Bara
- Hélène de Fougerolles as Márta Kiss
- Soo Garay as Jo
- Kathleen Gati as Justine
- Zoltán Gera as Concierge
- Kim Huffman as Lisa Warrington
- Ibolya Kotilla as Katalin
- Ági Margittay as Éva
- Philip Quast as Bradley
