= Mothering Sunday (film) =

British romantic drama film

- Theatrical release poster
- Directed by: Eva Husson
- Screenplay by: Alice Birch
- Based on: Mothering Sunday by Graham Swift
- Produced by: Elizabeth Karlsen; Stephen Woolley
- Starring: Odessa Young; Josh O'Connor; Ṣọpẹ́ Dìrísù; Glenda Jackson; Olivia Colman; Colin Firth
- Cinematography: Jamie Ramsay
- Edited by: Emilie Orsini
- Music by: Morgan Kibby
- Production company: Number 9 Films
- Distributed by: Lionsgate UK
- Release dates: 9 July 2021 (Cannes); 12 November 2021 (United Kingdom)
- Running time: 110 minutes
- Country: United Kingdom
- Language: English
- Box office: $2.1 million

Mothering Sunday is a 2021 British period romantic drama film directed by Eva Husson, from a screenplay by Alice Birch, based on Graham Swift's novel of the same name. The film follows the life of Jane Fairchild, played by Odessa Young, particularly during a Mothering Sunday in the wake of World War I which she spends with her wealthy lover, played by Josh O'Connor. Ṣọpẹ́ Dìrísù, Olivia Colman, and Colin Firth are also among the cast.

The film also marks the first appearance of Glenda Jackson in a theatrical release in over 30 years, having last appeared in King of the Wind (1990), as well as the penultimate film role of her lifetime. Mothering Sunday had its world premiere at the Cannes Film Festival on 9 July 2021. It received positive reviews from critics.

== Plot ==
In 1924, Jane Fairchild, an orphan and maidservant, works for the wealthy Niven family. On Mothering Sunday, Jane is given the day off to spend as she likes. Her lover, Paul Sheringham, the son of wealthy neighbours, invites her to spend the day with him at his family's house while his parents are out having lunch with the Nivens and the Hobday family.

Paul and Jane have been having a secret sexual affair for years, since Jane's arrival at the Nivens' estate. However, he is about to marry Emma Hobday. She had been unofficially engaged to the Nivens' son, James, who died in the Great War. Both Paul and Emma have mixed feelings about their engagement, but feel obliged to marry nevertheless.

At the Sheringham estate, Jane and Paul have sex; afterwards Paul leaves to join his family and fiancée for lunch, for which he is running late. Jane, alone at the house, wanders around naked examining how the Sheringhams live, then eats and drinks before setting off on her bike.

In a time-shift to a later point in her life, Jane has become a writer and meets Donald, a philosopher, while working in a book shop. He asks how she became a writer and she says there were three key events: her birth, the gift of a typewriter, and another that she prefers to keep secret.

The third incident is shown to have been on the same Mothering Sunday: Jane returns to the Niven estate from her tryst with Paul. Her employer Godfrey Niven gravely informs her that Paul died in a car crash on his way to the lunch. A shocked Jane hides her grief as Godfrey asks her to accompany him to Paul's home.

At the Sheringham estate, they are greeted by Ethel, the maid. After Godfrey breaks the news to her about Paul's death, he asks if there was anything such as a suicide note left behind in his room. Ethel tells them she has thoroughly tidied Paul's bedroom, but there was no note.

That evening, Clarrie Niven, also grieving the loss of her own sons in the war, opens up to Jane about the day's events. Knowing Jane is an orphan, she thoughtlessly tells her, "How very lucky. To have been comprehensively bereaved at birth. You have absolutely nothing to lose." Unable to sleep that night, Jane begins writing in a journal.

In another time-shift, after Jane and Donald are married, they learn that he has an inoperable brain tumour. He tells her that his death will perhaps fuel her to write her best work and laments that he will be unable to read it. Before he dies, Donald begs Jane to tell him about the third incident, but she instead tells him she loves him.

Years later, members of the press call at the elderly Jane's home after she wins a prestigious literary award. She is unimpressed and tells them she has already won all the available literary prizes, and her career has been wonderful, then returns to her typewriter.

== Cast ==
- Odessa Young as Jane Fairchild
  - Glenda Jackson as older Jane Fairchild
- Josh O'Connor as Paul Sheringham
- Olivia Colman as Mrs Clarrie Niven
- Colin Firth as Mr Godfrey Niven
- Sope Dirisu as Donald
- Patsy Ferran as Milly
- Emma D'Arcy as Emma Hobday
- Simon Shepherd as Mr Giles Hobday
- Caroline Harker as Mrs Sylvia Hobday
- Emily Woof as Mrs Sheringham
- Craig Crosbie as Mr Sheringham
- Charlie Oscar as Ethel
- Albert Welling as Mr Paxton, bookshop owner

== Production ==
In June 2020, it was announced that Odessa Young, Josh O'Connor, Olivia Colman, and Colin Firth had joined the cast of the film, with Eva Husson directing from a screenplay by Alice Birch. In September 2020, Sope Dirisu joined the cast of the film, with Lionsgate set to distribute in the United Kingdom.

Principal photography began in September 2020 in and around Guildford, Surrey. Filming wrapped that November. In May 2021, it was reported that Glenda Jackson would appear in the film.

== Release ==
In September 2020, Sony Pictures Classics acquired distribution rights to the film for North and Latin America, Asia excluding Japan, the Middle East, Eastern Europe, Turkey, airlines, and ships.

Mothering Sunday had its world premiere at the Cannes Film Festival on 9 July 2021. The film was released in cinemas in the UK on 12 November 2021.

It had its US premiere at the Hamptons International Film Festival in October 2021.

== Reception ==
On the review aggregator website Rotten Tomatoes, 77% of 137 critics' reviews are positive. The website's consensus reads: "Mothering Sunday works at a frustratingly chilly remove, but involving performances and solid overall craft mean it's rarely less than engaging." Metacritic, which uses a weighted average, assigned the film a score of 66 out of 100, based on 30 critics, indicating "generally favorable" reviews.

Writing for IndieWire, Kate Erbland called Mothering Sunday a "lush, aching period drama". Though she wrote the film's timeline shifts can be disorienting, "the strength of the film's emotion and talented cast (Young is joined by a murderer's row of stars, including Josh O'Connor, Colin Firth, Olivia Colman, and Emma D'Arcy) help ground it". The Hollywood Reporter's Leslie Felperin praised the performances and said the film "delivers beautifully when it comes to evoking the deliciously painful throb of a secret affair", making it "one of the sexiest heterosexual period dramas in some time". However, she said that the film's structure lacks "the wry, melancholy, and, above all, intensely literary interior voice of the book's protagonist". Clarisse Loughrey of The Independent wrote, "While so much of Mothering Sunday focuses on how grief, or the lack of grief, shapes its characters, it comes to an oddly inconclusive end", while A.O. Scott of The New York Times said the film "never conveys the intensity of erotic passion, the ardor of creative ambition or the agony of grief".

At the 2021 Cinéfest Sudbury International Film Festival, it won the award for Outstanding Female-Led Feature.
