= Here We Are (novel) =

Novel by Graham Swift

- First edition (UK)
- Author: Graham Swift
- Cover artist: The Birds of America (1827-38) Carolina Parrots; John James Audubon
- Language: English
- Genre: novel
- Publisher: Scribners (UK); Knopf (US)
- Publication date: 2020
- Publication place: United Kingdom
- Media type: Print
- Pages: 208
- ISBN: 1-47-118893-0

Here We Are is a novel published in 2020 by English author Graham Swift concerning a magician on Brighton Palace Pier.

== Plot ==
At the age of eight, Ronnie Deane was evacuated at the beginning of World War 2 from Bethnal Green to a large house called 'Evergrene' in rural Oxfordshire, where a childless Lawrences looked after him. Ronnie was taught magic tricks (or as he preferred 'illusions') by Eric Lawrence ('Lorenzo') and became an accomplished magician.

In 1959 Jack Robinson was the compere at a variety show on Brighton Pier where he advised up-and-coming magician Ronnie to advertise for an assistant. Ronnie and Evie became Pablo and Eve and moved up the bill, becoming the star of the show, and became engaged. Then Ronnie's mother died, while Evie remained in Brighton where Jack and Evie started an affair. On returning to Brighton, Ronnie and Evie broke off the engagement, but continued to draw in the crowds. By the end of the season Ronnie was now the 'Great Pablo', but the last performance was his greatest show.

Jack and Evie married, fifty years later Jack dies and Evie looks back over her life, specifically the final show on Brighton Pier where she questions about what really happened.

== Reception ==
- Barney Norris – writing in The Guardian – offered praise: "The book wonderfully captures the experience of evacuation during the second world war, which offers a lens through which to study the relationship between growing up and displacement...the thing about this novel: it has an archetypal quality, reminiscent of a folktale, that encourages the reader to think of the vanished stories their own family histories might reveal. I don't know quite how Swift does it – the book is light, perhaps slight, and the story is all told at one or two removes so that it reads as though it's happening in the next room. And yet it's a magical piece of writing: the work of a novelist on scintillating form."
- In World Literature Today, Donald P. Kaczvinsky wrote: "Here We Are evokes an age gone by, a world that vanished with the popularity of television and the appearance of the Beatles. Part rural idyll, part 1950s show-biz romance, Here We Are may seem wistfully nostalgic, barely in touch with the terrorism, global economy, and digital dominance that characterize our current times. Through the lives of these three characters, however, Swift captures, in stunning prose, the often-sad truths about maturation, love, and friendship—themes still relevant today. And in the astonishing culmination of the novel, as in all good magic shows, Swift stage-manages a disappearing act—a literary sleight of hand—that makes the reader wonder, 'How did he ever do that?'".
- Simon Baker – in Literature Review – was more critical: "After a while, though, the reader may feel (as this one did) that it is all perhaps a bit too familiar and that a few clinching details would have enlivened what occasionally tends towards stock portrayal.Another slight weakness is that too often we’re simply told things. Not enough of the novel is dramatised, and so not enough of the novel is dramatic. Instead the story unfolds mainly through summary, with Swift more often telling than showing what happened. That said, Here We Are – and indeed Swift himself – is too good to fall flat. It is nevertheless a pleasurable, low-gear excursion into the recent, yet strangely ancient past."
- In NPR, Helen McAlpin wrote: "Swift fills us in on what happened to the remaining two of his trio in the half-century since they met in Brighton, but builds suspense and keeps us turning pages to find out what happened to the magician. Readers who hope for the curtain to be drawn back completely may be as disappointed as audiences looking for the secrets behind conjuring a parrot from thin air and then making it disappear without a trace...Swift has demonstrated wizardry in his ability to conjure magic out of ordinary lives."
- Allan Massie – in The Scotsman – was positive: "Here We Are is a delight, all the characters and the settings thoroughly imagined and therefore inhabited. The description of the Great Pablo’s last astonishing illusion is masterly; you can sense the audience holding their breath and caught between astonishment and belief. He writes about the gaps between people and the attempts, sometimes vain attempts, to bridge them. He writes always with sympathy and understanding, and his ability to capture the fleeting moment is remarkable. He writes also about guilt and how we contrive to live with it and so often excuse ourselves. There is never anything flashy about Swift’s novels, but they are deeply satisfying. They are novels you want to read a second time to get more from them."
