= Waterland (film) =

- Directed by: Stephen Gyllenhaal
- Written by: Peter Prince (screenplay)
- Based on: The novel Waterland by Graham Swift
- Produced by: Patrick Cassavetti; Katy Mcguinness
- Starring: Jeremy Irons; Sinéad Cusack; Ethan Hawke
- Narrated by: Jeremy Irons
- Cinematography: Robert Elswit
- Edited by: Lesley Walker
- Music by: Carter Burwell
- Production companies: Palace Pictures; Fine Line Features; Pandora Cinema; Channel Four Films; British Screen Productions
- Distributed by: PolyGram Filmed Entertainment (United Kingdom); Fine Line Features (United States)
- Release dates: August 21, 1992 (UK); September 12, 1992 (TIFF); October 30, 1992 (US)
- Running time: 95 minutes
- Countries: United States; United Kingdom
- Language: English
- Budget: $10 million
- Box office: $1.1 million

Waterland is a 1992 British-American mystery drama film directed by Stephen Gyllenhaal, and starring Jeremy Irons, Sinéad Cusack, Ethan Hawke, Lena Headey and Pete Postlethwaite. It is based on Graham Swift's 1983 novel of the same name. The film moved the contemporary location of the novel from England to Pittsburgh and eliminated many of the extensive historical asides.

== Plot ==
The story centres on an anguished English-born Pittsburgh high school teacher Tom Crick and his life in 1974, going through a reassessment of his life. Crick finds out that his wife, Mary, is starting to lose her sanity and longing for a son they never had. Soon after, worried about Mary's mental health, Crick changes his method for teaching history, and starts narrating his life to his class and interweaving three generations of his family. His narrative is told in flashbacks that tell the story of a teenage Crick and his mentally challenged older brother Dick, who live in The Fens of England with their widowed father during World War II.

One day Crick arrives from school to discover Mary has abducted a child from a woman in a supermarket, which Mary believes it to be hers and "a gift from God". After Tom helps Mary return the baby and asks Mary to go to a counsellor, she leaves him and disappears. Crick then explains to his class how he and his wife had a teenage romance during the war, which led to a disastrous abortion that left her infertile. Crick is tortured by guilt over this, as well as the memory of the jealous behavior he had towards his brother when he began suspecting not only that his then-girlfriend Mary was falling in love with Dick, but also that she was secretly carrying Dick's baby. Around the same time Mary was having intimate encounters with Dick since Tom had asked her to "teach" his older brother about sex; after which Mary denied to young Tom that any intercourse with his brother had actually taken place and insisted that she was expecting Tom's child. The issue was never actually cleared before the couple decided to ask for an abortion to an old gypsy and medicaster woman who lived by the riverbank, with the aforementioned results.

Back in the present and during his classes, Crick slowly creates a vivid and tangible world while talking to the students and developing a bond with Matthew Price, a young man worried about the future and the only student of Crick who understands the real reason behind the History teacher's delving into his personal past mixed with England's. Crick narrates to Price about his mother's life as a nurse in a manor converted to a psychiatric hospital after World War I and which used to belong to Crick's grandfather, a successful brewer and a once respected and influential member of The Fens' community and town. The hospital was the place where his mother met Crick's father, Henry, who had fought in the Great War. Crick also tells Price that there were always rumours during his adolescence that his brother Dick was actually the product of incest between his mother and his grandfather, with Dick being born shortly before his mother married Tom's father Henry.

Young Mary's relationship with Crick's older brother sets off a chain of tragic events when she becomes pregnant, either by Tom or by Dick. Believing that a wealthy young man in the community, Freddie Parr, was the father of Mary's baby, Dick murders him and throws his body into the river. After the body appears at the dredging bridge run by their father Henry, Tom confronts Dick, telling him he knows he murdered Freddie and tried to make it look like an accidental drowning. Dick then threatens Tom with a beer bottle he used to hit Freddie Parr before drowning him. After calming himself, Dick takes Tom to their house's attic, where their mother had left Dick a case containing a special brew of beer created by their grandfather (which Dick used to get Parr drunk before hitting him in the head with it and throwing him in the river) and a letter, which was also written by Tom and Dick's grandfather and which reveals to the latter that he was indeed conceived by his mother and his grandfather. After Dick forces Tom to read the letter and tell him what it reveals, he suffers a nervous breakdown and runs away from his home, throwing himself into the water. Crick's narration to his class room or Price (Crick's perception starts becoming more confused after his wife leaves him) ends with the death of Dick by drowning.

Soon after finishing his adolescence's history, Crick is dismissed from his job as a teacher, as a result of the complaints some of the students had made regarding the subject and direction of Crick's stories. In his last speech before leaving school, Tom Crick starts talking to a full auditorium of students, and ends up directly talking to Price, asking him to never lose hope in a better future for him and the whole of mankind. It is then shown that Crick returns to the Fens in England to look for his estranged wife, while hoping for a possible renewal of their relationship.

Arriving at the place by the lake Tom and Mary used to walk when younger, Crick sees Mary far away, strolling down the fields. He walks in her direction.

== Cast ==
- Jeremy Irons as Tom Crick
- Sinéad Cusack as Mary Crick
- Ethan Hawke as Matthew Price
- John Heard as Lewis Scott
- Grant Warnock as Young Tom
- Lena Headey as Young Mary
- Pete Postlethwaite as Henry Crick (as Peter Postlethwaite)
- Cara Buono as Judy Dobson
- David Morrissey as Dick Crick
- Callum Dixon as Freddie Parr
- Sean Maguire as Peter (as Sean McGuire)
- Ross McCall as Terry
- Camilla Hebditch as Shirley
- Stewart Richman as Ernest Atkinson
- Siri Neal as Helen Atkinson
- Gareth Thomas as Publican
- Susannah Fellows as Rebecca Scott
- Maggie Gyllenhaal as Maggie Ruth

== Production ==
The film was one of the first two co-productions by Fine Line Features, a subsidiary of New Line Cinema.

The film was shot in Pittsburgh, Pennsylvania as well as parts of the UK including East Anglia, London and at Twickenham Film Studios. Part of the film was filmed at Doddington Place Gardens, near Faversham. The Victorian mansion was used as the ancestral home to Tom Crick.

The music score, available on CD, is by Carter Burwell.

== Reception ==
On the review aggregator website Rotten Tomatoes, 47% of 17 critics' reviews are positive.

The author of the novel on which the film is based, Graham Swift, was not impressed. He described the experience as "the movie business at its crassest".
