= Bungy Watson =

England international rugby union player

- Born: James Henry Digby Watson; 13 August 1890 Southsea, England
- Died: 15 October 1914 (aged 24) HMS Hawke, Atlantic Ocean
- School: The King's School, Canterbury; Edinburgh Academy
- University: University of Edinburgh
- Occupation: Physician

Rugby union career
International career
Years	Team	Apps	(Points)
1914	England	3	(3)
- Military career
- Allegiance: United Kingdom
- Branch: Royal Navy
- Rank: Surgeon
- Unit: HMS Hawke
- Memorials: Chatham Naval Memorial

James Henry Digby "Bungy" Watson (31 August 1890 – 15 October 1914) was an English rugby union player. He won 3 caps for England, all in the 1914 Five Nations Championship. He was killed while serving as a surgeon aboard HMS Hawke when it was torpedoed and sunk by U-9 in 1914 during World War I, and is commemorated on the Chatham Naval Memorial.

== Early life ==
Watson was born on 31 August 1890 at Southsea to Eliza V. Watson and her husband Captain James Herbert Watson, an engineer in the Royal Navy. He attended The King's School, Canterbury from September 1899 to April 1906, and played for the First XV in 1905. He then transferred to Edinburgh Academy for his final two years of schooling, playing for the First XV there too. There he earned his nickname "Bungy" after using the King's Canterbury term for a rubber, which was unknown at the Academy. He then studied medicine at the University of Edinburgh from 1908 to 1913, graduating Bachelor of Medicine, Bachelor of Surgery. At University, he played for the University Rugby XV, and was also the University middleweight boxing champion.

== Rugby career ==
=== International appearances ===
Opposition	Score	Result	Date	Venue	Ref(s)
Wales	10–9	Won	17 January 1914	Twickenham	
Scotland	15–16	Won	21 March 1914	Inverleith	
France	13–39	Won	13 April 1914	Colombes	

== Military service ==
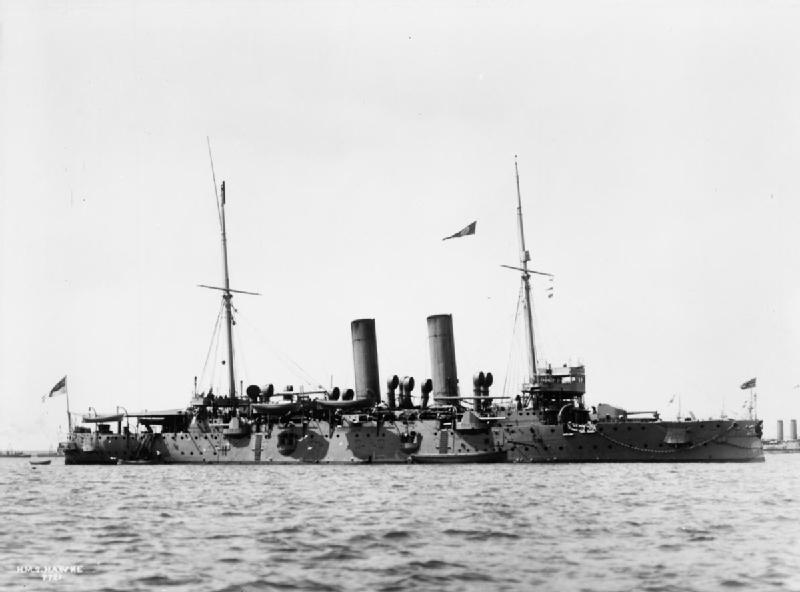
HMS Hawke

At the start of the World War I, Watson was appointed Surgeon in the Royal Navy aboard HMS Hawke. The ship was part of the Northern Patrol, and on 15 October 1914, Hawke and HMS Theseus were patrolling in the North Sea, 60 miles off Aberdeen when a torpedo launched by the German submarine U-9 struck the Hawke amidships. The impact detonated the ship's magazine and caused two large explosions. The ship sank quickly with the loss of 525 men, including Watson.

He is commemorated on the Chatham Naval Memorial, at Twickenham war memorial, and at Blackheath.

== See also ==
- List of international rugby union players killed in action during the First World War
