= Prix du Meilleur Livre Étranger =

French literary prize

- Native name: Prix du Meilleur Livre Étranger
- Presented by: Robert Carlier (Founder), Sofitel (Sponsor since 2011)
- Established: 1948

The Prix du Meilleur Livre Étranger (Best Foreign Book Prize) is a French literary prize created in 1948. It is awarded yearly in two categories: Novel and Essay for books translated into French. Since 2011, the prize has been supported by Sofitel (a luxury hotel brand), and the winners are traditionally announced and honored in November.

The prize aims to celebrate the richness and diversity of global literary voices and introduce French readers to exceptional works from around the world.

== Prix du Meilleur livre étranger — Novel ==
- 2024: Hisham Matar, for My Friends as Mes amis (Gallimard).
- 2023: Sebastian Barry, for Old God's Time as Au bon vieux temps de Dieu (Joëlle Losfeld).
- 2022: Juan Gabriel Vásquez, for Volver la vista atrás as Une rétrospective (Le Seuil)
- 2021: Guzel Yakhina, for Дети мои as Les enfants de la Volga (Noir sur Blanc).
- 2020: Colum McCann, for Apeirogon (Belfond)
- 2019ː Christoph Hein, for Glückskind mit Vater as L'ombre d'un père (Metaillié)
- 2018ː Eduardo Halfon, for Duelo as Deuils (Quai Voltaire)
- 2017: Viet Thanh Nguyen, for The Sympathizer as Le Sympathisant (Belfond)
- 2016: Helen MacDonald, for H is for Hawk as M pour Mabel (Fleuve éditions)
- 2015: Martin Amis, for The Zone of Interest as La Zone d'intérêt (Calmann-Lévy)
- 2014: Drago Jancar, for To noč sem jo viel (I Saw Her That Night) as Cette nuit, je l’ai vue (Éditions Phébus)
- 2013: Alan Hollinghurst, for The Stranger's Child as L'Enfant de l'étranger (Albin Michel)
- 2012: A. B. Yehoshua, for The Retrospective as Rétrospective
- 2011: Alessandro Piperno, for Persecuzione. Il fuoco amico dei ricordi as Persécution
- 2010: Gonçalo M. Tavares, for Aprender a Rezar na Era da Técnica (Learning to Pray in the Age of Technique), as Apprendre à prier à l’ère de la technique, Viviane Hamy
- 2009: Karel Schoeman for Hierdie Lewe (This Life), as Cette vie, Phébus, Paris
- 2008: Charles Lewinsky, for Melnitz
- 2007: Joseph McBride, for Searching for John Ford (as À la recherche de John Ford)
- 2006: Nicole Krauss, for The History of Love (as L'Histoire de l'amour)
- 2005: Colm Tóibín, for The Master (as Le Maître)
- 2004: Carlos Ruiz Zafón, for The Shadow of the Wind (as L'Ombre du vent)
- 2003: Peter Carey, for True History of the Kelly Gang (as La Véritable Histoire du gang Kelly)
- 2002: Orhan Pamuk, for My Name is Red (as Mon nom est Rouge)
- 2001: Per Olov Enquist, for The Visit of the Royal Physician (as Le Médecin personnel du roi)
- 2000: Philip Roth, for American Pastoral (as Pastorale américaine)
- 1999: Péter Nádas, for A Book of Memories (as Le Livre des mémoires)
- 1998: Anna Maria Ortese, for The Lament of the Linnet (as La Douleur du chardonneret)
- 1997: António Lobo Antunes, for The Inquisitors' Manual (as Le Manuel des inquisiteurs)
- 1996: Jonathan Coe, for What a Carve Up! as Testament à l'anglaise
- 1995: Joan Brady for Theory of War (as L’Enfant Loué)
- 1994: Graham Swift, for Ever After (as À tout jamais)
- 1992: Jane Urquhart, for The Whirlpool as Niagara
- 1990: Tim O'Brien, for The Things They Carried as À propos du courage
- 1988: Margarita Karapanou, for The sleepwalker (as Le Somnambule)
- 1985: Salman Rushdie, for Shame as La Honte
- 1984: Vasily Grossman for Life and Fate (as Vie et Destin)
- 1983: Hector Bianciotti, for L'amour n'est pas aimé
- 1973: John Hawkes, for The Blood Oranges as Les Oranges de sang
- 1972: Fred Chappell, for Dagon as Dagon le dieu-poisson
- 1969: Gabriel García Márquez, for One Hundred Years of Solitude as Cent ans de solitude
- 1966: Peter Härtling, for Niembsch as Niembsch ou l'Immobilité
- 1965: John Updike, for The Centaur as Le Centaure
- 1956: Alejo Carpentier, for The Lost Steps/Los pasos perdidos as Le Partage des eaux (Galimard)
- 1950: Miguel Ángel Asturias, for El Señor Presidente as Monsieur le Président

== Prix du Meilleur livre étranger — Essay ==
- 2024: Anna Funder, for The Invisible Madame Orwell as L'Invisible Madame Orwell (Éditions Héloïse d'Ormesson).
- 2023: Chris De Stoop, for Het boek Daniël as Le Livre de Daniel (Globe).
- 2022: Maria Stepanova, for Памяти памяти as En mémoire de la mémoire (Stock).
- 2021: Kapka Kassabova, for To the Lake: A Balkan Journey of War and Escape as L'Écho du lac (Marchialy).
- 2020: Daniel Mendelsohn, for Trois anneaux. Un conte d’Exil (Flammarion)
- 2019ː Wolframm Eilenberger, for Zeit der Zauberer as Le temps des magiciens (Albin Michel)
- 2018: Stefano Massini, for Qualcosa sui Lehman as Les Frères Lehman (Éditions du Globe)
- 2017: Philippe Sands, for East West Street. On the Origins of Genocide and Crimes against Humanity as Retour à Lemberg (Albin Michel)
- 2016: Samar Yazbek, for Bawwābaẗ arḍ al-ʿadam as Les Portes du néant (Stock)
- 2015: Christoph Ransmayr, for Atlas eines ängstlichen Mannes as Atlas d'un homme inquiet (Albin-Michel)
- 2014: Göran Rosenberg, for Une brève halte après Auschwitz (Seuil)
- 2013: Erwin Mortier, for Psaumes balbutiés. Livre d'heures de ma mère (Fayard)
- 2012: David Van Reybrouck, for Congo. Une histoire (Actes Sud)
- 2011: Marina Tsvetaeva, for Récits et essais (tome 2) (Seuil)
- 2010: Antonia Fraser, for Vous partez déjà ? Ma vie avec Harold Pinter
- 2009: Pascal Khoo Thwe, for Une odyssée birmane (Gallimard)
- 2008: William T. Vollmann, for Pourquoi êtes-vous pauvres ? (Actes Sud).
- 2006: Diane Middlebrook, for Ted Hughes & Sylvia Plath, histoire d'un mariage (Phébus)
- 2005: Mikhail Shishkin, for Dans les pas de Byron et Tolstoï (Noir sur Blanc)
- 2004: Azar Nafisi, for Lire Lolita à Téhéran (Plon)
- 2003: Hella S. Haasse, for La Récalcitrante (Seuil)
- 1999: W. G. Sebald, for Les Anneaux de Saturne (Actes Sud)
- 1998: Verena von der Heyden-Rynsch, for Écrire la vie, trois siècles de journaux intimes féminins
- 1996: Michael Holroyd, for Carrington (Flammarion)
- 1993: Predrag Matvejević, for "Bréviaire Méditerranéen" (Fayard)
- 1977: Mario Praz, for La Chair, la mort et le diable (Denoël)
- 1974: Abram Tertz (=Andrei Sinyavsky), for Une voix dans le chœur (Seuil)
- 1966: Jerzy Kosinski, for L'Oiseau bariolé
- 1965: John Cowper Powys, for Autobiographie (Gallimard)
- 1964: Robert-Marie Grant, for La Gnose et les origines chrétiennes (Seuil)
- 1963: Oscar Lewis, for Les Enfants de Sanchez (Gallimard)
