= Chatham Naval Memorial =

Large obelisk in Chatham, Kent, England

Coordinates: 51°23′01″N 0°31′56″E

- Commonwealth War Graves Commission
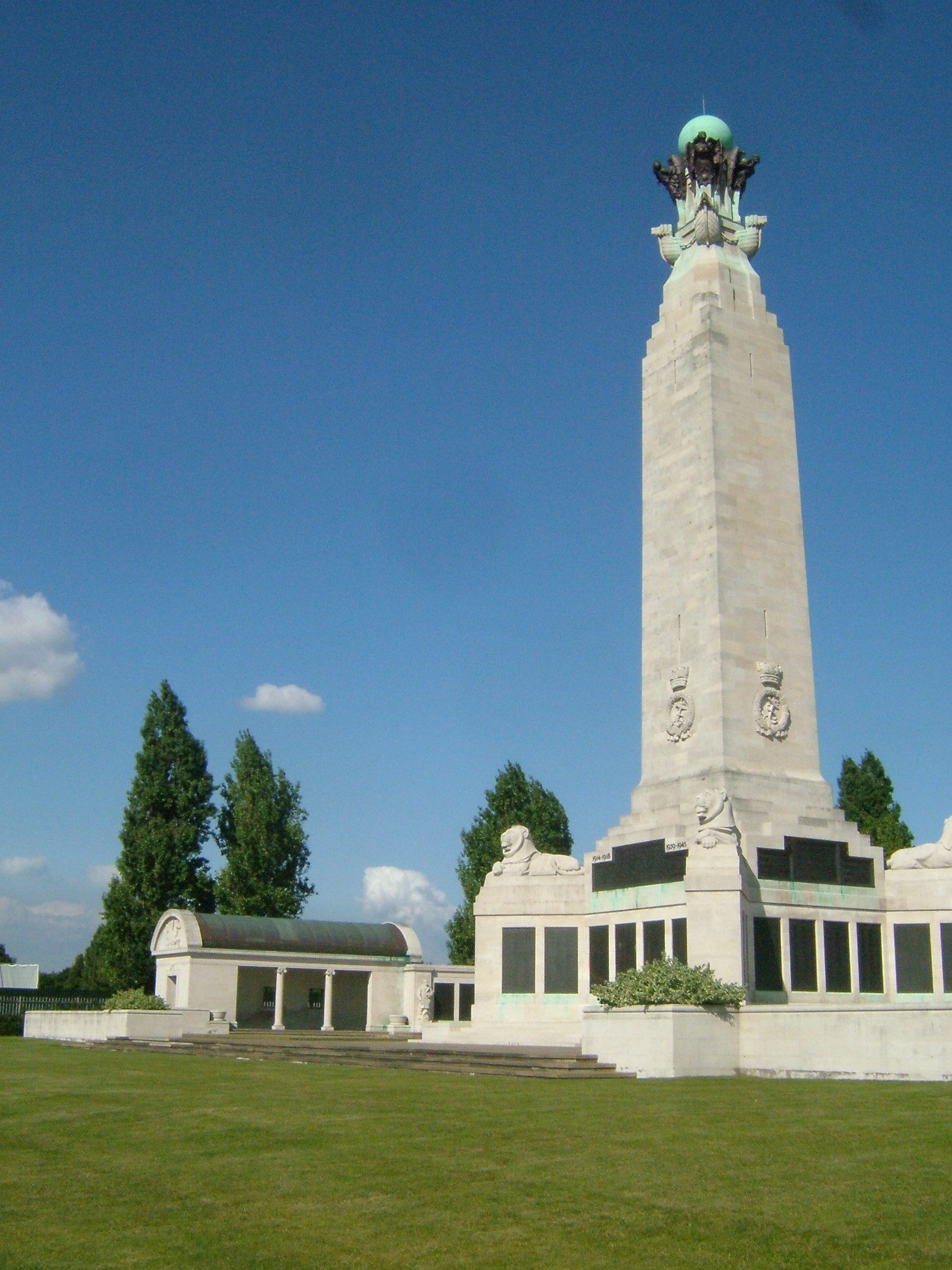
- Chatham Naval Memorial
- For members of the Royal Navy who died during the First and Second World War and have no known grave
- Unveiled: 26 April 1924
- Designed by: Robert Lorimer
- Commemorated: 18,621

Chatham Naval Memorial is a large obelisk situated in the English town of Chatham, Kent, which is in the Medway Towns. The memorial is a feature of the Great Lines Heritage Park. The huge expanse of the Great Lines was in its own right a layer of defence to protect Chatham Dockyard from attack.

== History ==
Chatham was a principal manning port of the Royal Navy during the First World War and thus was dedicated as the site of one of three memorials to sailors, airmen and marines of the Royal Navy who lost their lives during the conflict but who have no known grave.

The other memorials were situated at Portsmouth and Plymouth. The obelisks were designed by Sir Robert Lorimer and the one at Chatham originally contained 8,515 names. They include two Victoria Cross recipients, Skipper Thomas Crisp (Merchant Marine), and Major Francis John William Harvey (Royal Marines Light Infantry), besides poet Flight Commander Jeffery Day (Royal Naval Air Service) and England rugby international, Surgeon James (Bungy) Watson. Of the three obelisks, Chatham's is the only one sited on a hill, making it visible over a wide area.

It is made of Portland stone with bronze plaques. It has steps up to a plinth with inscription plaques, and projecting corners with reclining lions, beneath a stepped base to the obelisk, which has a stepped top to an elaborate finial with corner ships prows and bronze supports to a ball.

Over 30,000 people attended the unveiling by the Prince of Wales (the future Edward VIII) on 26 April 1924.

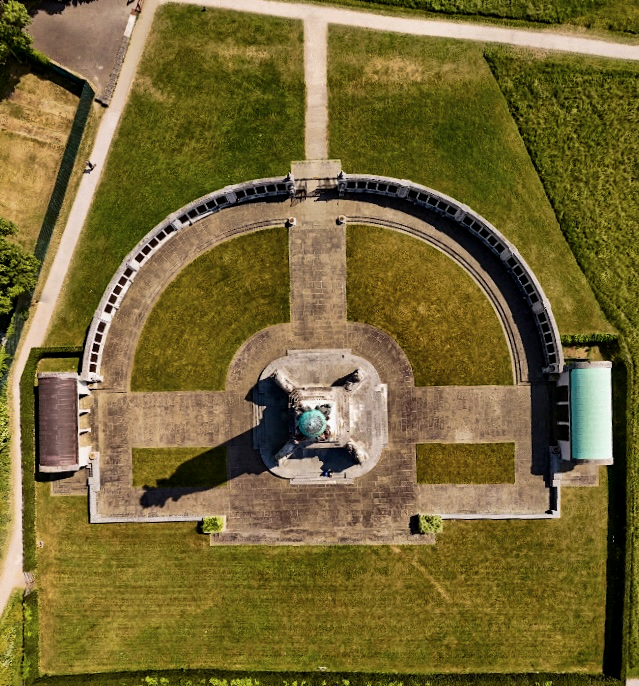
Aerial view of the Chatham Naval Memorial on the Great Lines, Chatham, Kent, England.

After the Second World War and its consequent loss of life, the decision was made to expand the three memorials and so the Chatham Naval Memorial was created from the 'Chatham Obelisk' and was given a surround designed by Sir Edward Maufe which contains 10,098 additional names from the later conflict. The surround is also made of Portland Stone, with bronze plaques. It has two pavilions; north and south which look out towards Chatham. Along the surround are four Portland Stone statues of sailors. The Extension was unveiled by the Duke of Edinburgh on 15 October 1952

Those commemorated from the Second World War include posthumous Victoria Cross recipient Captain Edward Fegen and war artist Eric Ravilious.

It is maintained by the Commonwealth War Graves Commission. It became a listed building in 1996, and was upgraded to Grade I in May 2016 for the centenary of the Battle of Jutland.

The memorial featured prominently in the 1996 novel Last Orders by British author Graham Swift, as did the Medway Towns. The novel was adapted into a film and directed by Australian director Fred Schepisi and starred inter alia Sir Michael Caine, Bob Hoskins, Ray Winstone, Sir Tom Courtenay and Helen Mirren. The memorial featured in a number of scenes.

== See also ==
- Plymouth Naval Memorial
- Portsmouth Naval Memorial
- Grade I listed war memorials in England
- Gillingham War Memorial

== Further information ==
Further information see Commonwealth War Graves database page
