= Learning to Swim and Other Stories =

Collection of stories by Graham Swift

- First edition (UK)
- Author: Graham Swift
- Language: English
- Publisher: London Magazines Editions (UK); Poseidon Press (US)
- Publication date: 1982
- Publication place: United Kingdom
- Pages: 146
- ISBN: 978-0-904-38846-6

Learning to Swim and Other Stories is the first collection of stories by English author Graham Swift published in 1982. All eleven stories were first published in British magazines.

== Analysis ==
Nasrullah Mambrol writes that "The motif of marital unhappiness recurs in the collection as a whole. The husbands in the stories fear intimacy and invite betrayal through their inability to connect... The stories differ only in the degree of antagonism exhibited and the variety of pain-inducing strategies each story describes, since all the couples in Swift’s stories appear to stay together in order to “conceal their feelings", as the narrator of “Cliffedge” suggests, rather than seek emotional fulfilment.

== Stories ==
- "Seraglio" (first published 1977 in London Magazine) - Set in Istanbul where a couple are on holiday. The wife had suffered a miscarriage and was now unable to bear children so instead they have frequent and expensive holidays. That day they had been to Topkapi Palace, the husband running through the guidebook. On the way back to the hotel they witness a car accident. In the evening the wife said she'd been assaulted by a hotel employee and that she wanted to go home to cut short the holiday. The husband considers his own unfaithfulness and he agrees to return with her to England.
- "The Tunnel" - the narrator had eloped with his girlfriend Clancy to a South London tenement block, and then he starts painting, inspired by Gauguin. Then they run short of money and so take menial jobs which spoil their relationship. Clancy's elderly uncle has told her that he will pass all his money to her on his death. The narrator then scalds his hands and is unable to work when he notices some youths digging a tunnel and observes them every day...
- "Hotel" (first published 1981 in London Magazine) - A man recovers from a psychiatric hospital following guilt over his mother's death. He then decides to run a hotel, caring especially for those guests suffering guilt, a pair then cause trouble for the staff and other guests...
- "Hoffmeier's Antelope" (first published in London Magazine) - The narrator's Uncle Walter is a zookeeper where he looks after the eponymous antelopes which were discovered in the wild by his friend Hoffmeier. The antelopes were brought to European zoos as they became threatened in the wild. Now the only example survives in London Zoo, where Walter has looked after it for several years. The narrator briefly lives with his Uncle and they discuss the meaning of 'existence'. Then Walter and the antelope disappear.
- "The Son" (first published in Punch) - Kosta runs a Greek café in Camden with his wife and adopted son Adoni after they moved away from Greece but Kosta has never told Adoni that he is adopted. Adoni works hard at the cafe but one day he asks if he can have a holiday to Greece. When Adoni arrives home after the holiday, he tells Kosta about not only the truth about himself but also about Kosta's parents.
- "The Hypochondriac" (first published in London Magazine) - A doctor (GP) had a patient M, and examined him and told him that there was nothing wrong with him, but M kept returning to him - in the end the doctor told him not to return. A few days later M's neighbour rang the doctor to come quickly. When the doctor eventually arrived he learnt that M had been taken to the hospital and died, but no cause of the death could be found. The doctor then has a breakdown as he believes he saw M...
- "Gabor" (first published in Punch) - After the war in 1957 the narrators father decided to foster a Hungarian child the same age as his son. Gabor was a refugee from Budapest and he and the narrator hit it off, playing many war games against imaginary Germans.
- "The Watch" (First published in Firebird 1) - In 1809 in Lublin the narrators great-grandfather Stanislav created a pocket-watch which never needed winding and ran perpetually. He kept it and lived to be one hundred and thirty-three (when he was killed by a horse-drawn bus in Ludgate Hill). The watch was passed down to his surviving 3rd son Feliks who lived to be one hundred and sixty-one when he was struck by lightning. The narrators father Stefan died in the Battle of Jutland. The narrator is now the owner of the watch...
- "Cliffedge" (first published in New Stories 5) - The narrators child-like brother Neil, is two years younger; every year the narrator takes him to the same seaside resort. Neil enjoys the same activities as a child while the narrator looks after him. Then when the narrator is distracted Neil falls from a cliff edge and is killed.
- "Chemistry" (first published in Winter's Tales 27) - The narrators lives with his grandfather, mother and lodger Ralph. Grandfather builds a toy boat and it eventually sinks in the middle of pond. The narrators dead father tells him that the mother sabotaged the boat. Meanwhile Ralph begins a relationship with the mother and the grandfather spends more time in his shed experimenting with chemistry. Then grandfather apparently commits suicide using by using prussic acid.
- "Learning to Swim" (first published 1978 in New Stories 3) - On holiday in Cornwall Mrs Singleton, Mr Singleton and their son Paul are at the beach and have both considered leaving each other. Mr Singleton had once been a good swimmer when he was a teenager and he is determined that his son should learn to swim. Mrs Singleton is sunbathing on the beach but is worried about her son's exertions trying to swim.

== Reception ==
The collection was well received in England but was not as favourable in America. In Contemporary Authors (V.122) "more than one critic remarked that some of the tales seemed too studied and even uncompelling." Many of his works, especially short stories, leave the reader with many unanswered questions. Most questions are easily answered by considering Swift's work as a whole. Learning to Swim is not a collection of happy, light tales. One critic writes, "A list of themes reads like a microcosm of the Sunday morning newspapers: infidelity to partner (three), sexual traumas (two), incest (one), age (three), suspected bestiality (one), murder and mayhem (one)."

- Barry J. Fishman from Brown University concludes: "Is it significant that the British reviewers liked these characters more than their American counterparts? An American reviewer remarks that "One unmistakable thing is that [the stories] are all about moral cowards and spineless individuals collapsing within the insidious pressures of evaded responsibilities, evaded vision." While this is true, there is also something very gripping about all of Swift's characters that makes you sympathize. Swift's style evokes empathy from the reader for the character, and fosters in the reader a desire to learn more about the character and his problems. It is Swift's command of this style that make his tragic figures so interesting to the reader."
- Publishers Weekly says "Swift's collection of tales about lovers at odds with each other exhibits strong characterizations but lacks the revelatory moments we expect from short fiction."
- Lewis Stone of the LA Times also has reservations: "the stories are neither pure fantasy nor pure emotion, but it is a mixture of the two, as if reality and the absurd could be evenly mixed like oil and water without separating on different levels...Glimmers and slivers here remind us of what Graham Swift is capable of. Regrettably, they are too few and far between to save Learning to Swim from drowning in its own blandness.
- Michael Gorra writing in the New York Times states that: "Mr. Swift often writes in the first person, and yet the voices he adopts in doing so seem awkwardly worn, like a jacket, borrowed for a special occasion, that does not quite fit...most of his stories seem minor - pleasant reading but no more."
