= Half a Loaf Is Better than None =

Half a Loaf Is Better than None may refer to:

- "Half a Loaf Is Better than None" (Battle for Dream Island), a 2011 web series episode
- "Half a loaf is better than no bread" (or "Half a loaf is better than none"), a proverbial phrase

== See also ==
- Half a Loaf (disambiguation)
- Half a Loaf of Kung Fu, a 1978 Hong Kong martial arts film
