= Out of This World =

Out of This World may refer to:

== Film and television ==
- Out of This World (1945 film), an American romantic comedy directed by Hall Walker
- Out of This World, a 1954 short film featured in season 6 of Mystery Science Theater 3000
- Out of This World, a 2004 Japanese film directed by Junji Sakamoto
- The Space Between Us (film) (working title Out of This World), an American film directed by Peter Chelsom
- Out of This World (American TV series), a 1987–1991 sitcom
- Out of This World (British TV series), a 1962 science fiction anthology series
- "Out of This World" (The Brady Bunch), a 1974 TV episode
- "Out of This World" (Ruby Gloom), a 2008 TV episode

== Music ==
=== Albums ===
- Out of This World (Europe album), 1988
- Out of This World (Maureen McGovern album), 1996
- Out of This World (Pepper Adams Donald Byrd Quintet album), 1961
- Out of This World (Radiophonic album), a collection of library recordings from the BBC Radiophonic Workshop, 1976
- Out of This World (Shakatak album), 1983
- Out of This World (Teddy Edwards album), 1981
- Out of This World (The Three Sounds album), 1966
- Out of This World (Walter Benton album), 1960
- Out of This World, by Nichelle Nichols, 1991
- Outta This World, by JLS, 2010

=== Songs ===
- "Out of This World" (Johnny Mercer song), written by Harold Arlen and Mercer, 1944; recorded by numerous artists
- "Out of This World", by Black Flag from In My Head, 1985
- "Out of This World", by Bush from Golden State, 2001
- "Out of This World", by the Chiffons, 1966
- "Out of This World", by the Cure from Bloodflowers, 2000
- "Out of This World", by the Grass Roots from Leaving It All Behind, 1969
- "Out of This World", by Jonas Brothers from Jonas Brothers, 2007
- "Out of This World", by Marillion from Afraid of Sunlight, 1995
- "Out of This World", by Melanie C and Jools Holland, 2011
- "Out of This World", by Tim Finn from The Conversation, 2008

== Literature ==
- Out of This World (Leinster book), a 1958 science fiction collection by Murray Leinster
- Out of This World (Swift novel), a 1988 novel by Graham Swift
- Out of This World (Watt-Evans novel), a 1993 fantasy novel by Lawrence Watt-Evans
- Out of This World, a 1986–1989 young adult science fiction series by Marilyn Kaye
- Out of This World, a 1949 novel by Neville Goddard
- Out of This World, a fantasy novel by Ali Sparkes
- Out of This World, a 1950 book by Lowell Thomas Jr.
- "Out of This World", a 1964 short story by Alfred Bester

== Other uses ==
- Out of This World (card trick), a card trick created by Paul Curry in 1942
- Out of This World (musical), a 1950 musical by Cole Porter and Dwight Taylor
- Out of This World (video game), or Another World, a 1991 action-adventure game
