= Ever After (novel) =

1992 novel by Graham Swift

- First edition (UK)
- Author: Graham Swift
- Language: English
- Publisher: Picador (UK); Knopf (US)
- Publication date: 1992
- Publication place: United Kingdom
- Pages: 261
- ISBN: 0-330-32331-8

Ever After is a novel by British writer Graham Swift published in 1992 by Picador, containing 'repeated intertextual invocations' of Hamlet. It won the 1994 Prix du Meilleur Livre Étranger.

== Plot ==
Academic Bill Unwin sits in his college room, recovering from his suicide attempt and thinking back over his life. Starting with his childhood in Paris where his aloof father killed himself, and his mother had a relationship with an American, Sam who made a fortune in plastics and then became his stepfather. The narration then moves to 1950's Soho where Bill marries Ruth, an actress who later dies of lung cancer. Throughout his life Bill never reconciled himself to his successful stepfather, who attempts and fails to build bridges with Bill. The other strand is the private notebooks of a Victorian predecessor Matthew Pearce which are entrusted to Bill. These notebooks show the breakdown of his relationship with his wife and father-in-law over his unshakeable belief in Darwinism, and Bill tries to square them with his own identity.

== Reception ==
The Guardian reported that Ever After met with "indifferent reviews". Stephen Wall from London Review of Books gave a mixed review, concluding that that "In the end, and despite its manifestly humane intentions, the different areas of narrative interest in Ever After disperse rather than concentrate attention." Richard Eder from the Los Angeles Times left a negative review, stating: " Ever After is almost entirely cerebral, and that would be fine. But it is more cerebral than intelligent. Unwin’s groping, though voiced in a semblance of donnish wit and paradox, is not genuinely interesting."
