= Shuttlecock (novel) =

1981 novel by Graham Swift

- First edition
- Author: Graham Swift
- Language: English
- Publisher: Allen Lane (UK); Washington Sq. (US)
- Publication date: 1981 (UK), 1985 (US)
- Publication place: United Kingdom
- Media type: Print & audio
- Pages: 224
- ISBN: 0-7139-1413-0

Shuttlecock, described as a psychological thriller, was Graham Swift's second novel, published in 1981 by Allen Lane. It won the Geoffrey Faber Memorial Prize in 1983 and was released as a film in 1993.

== Plot ==
Prentis, junior assistant in the 'dead crimes' department of the police archives in London, starts writing a personal memoir almost inadvertently. It is in response to his growing alienation from his wife and children; to regular visits to his estranged father, who has recently become catatonic and is in hospital; and to the confusing situation at work where he suspects his boss, Quinn, of suppressing crucial files in a case he is asked to investigate. Eventually it emerges that the files concern a friend that his father has betrayed and a blackmailer who claimed to have evidence that his father was not the World War II war-hero he claimed to be. Quinn is approaching retirement and has been grooming Prentis to see if he would make a suitably humane successor. Now he gives Prentis the choice of whether Quinn should destroy the files in question. When he agrees, he is guaranteed promotion. At the same time he loses his sense of inferiority to his father and manages to rescue his family situation at home. He has come to the conclusion that the impressions we make are fictitious. His father’s story of his work as a spy in Nazi-occupied France, passages from which are interspersed with Prentis’ own narrative, was created to hide the real truth about himself. Prentis, in his turn, is now creating a new version of himself in order to conceal his own weakness and uncertainties.

== Reception ==
The novel was greeted with highly favourable reviews on its appearance, selections from which were quoted on the covers of later editions. In commenting on this in an early survey of Swift's fiction, Del Ivan Janik observed of the narrator’s strategy for dealing with the past - an abiding theme in his work - that it consists in this case of a humanising acceptance of uncertainty. The layered narratives of the novel, he continues, make of it a "work of art in which all aspects of the craft of fiction combine to create a satisfying whole".

Appreciation of his writing does not come easily, however, because of the author's "penchant for the parochial, the drab and the unremarkable". One anonymous reviewer found the book "almost entirely lacking in suspense. As a character study of a small-minded, petty British Civil Servant, it works for a while, but only the most complacent reader will not be put off by the abrupt character reversals, the obvious parallels between past and present that Swift uses to give his narrative more structure, and the fact that Shuttlecock, for all the fluency of Swift's liquid style, is slow, slow, slow. Readers looking for a suspense novel would do better elsewhere." On the other hand, Punch acquiesced with description of the novel as a psychological thriller. "The connections between Prentis's professional and personal lives are delineated with great skill and the quality of writing is consistently high. The result is one that should appeal equally to readers of 'straight' novels and readers of thrillers."
