= Out of This World (Swift novel) =

1988 novel by Graham Swift

Out of this World
- First edition
- Author: Graham Swift
- Language: English
- Publisher: Viking (UK); Poseidon Press (US)
- Publication date: 1988
- Publication place: United Kingdom
- Media type: Print
- Pages: 208
- ISBN: 978-0-6708-20849

Out of this World is the fourth novel by English author Graham Swift published in 1988 by Viking in the UK and by Poseidon Press in the US.

== Plot ==
The majority of the novel is narrated by Harry, the son of Robert Beech a Victoria Cross veteran of WW1 and Harry's estranged daughter Sophie (who lives in New York). The novel is set in 1982, ten years after the death of Harry's father, in a car bomb by the IRA. Robert Beech was a prominent figure in the Arms industry but his death led to his son cutting short his career as a news photographer. The novel concentrates on the broken relationship between Harry (now an aerial photographer) and his daughter Sophie and the scars caused by the death of Robert.

== Reception ==
Jonathan Coe writing in The Guardian has "a problem with the restlessness of the narrative voices. The story swings like a pendulum between the viewpoints of Harry and Sophie, and neither of them is a good narrator...It's not just that this is an effort to read. It's also a compromise solution to the task which Swift has set himself, which is the incorporation of something vast, amorphous and random - history, no less - into what is still an essential tidy sort of novel...You can't but applaud the scope and ambition of this novel. What it lacks is a radical approach to structure which would in some way reflect the sheer mess of the events with which it attempts to deal... Out Of This World relies too heavily on style to carry the burden of this programme. In a case like this, jagged edges are not enough.

Richard Eder from the Los Angeles Times also has misgivings: "It is a cramped story set on a large stage...Swift manipulates his story so that its ironies turn up punctually, and its reflective message is unmistakable. The story, unfortunately, is a shoddy, cliche-ridden vehicle for them...Out of this World is a reflection stretched into novel form. We have met all these superior, alienated people before, dozens of times. We have heard the dying fall of their voices. It is when Swift's own voice comes out, now and then, meditating through Harry on the responsibilities of art, craft and life, that his book relinquishes the wasp-buzzing of its characters, and sets off the sudden flash of a wasp's sting.
