= Eva Husson =

French film director and screenwriter

Eva Husson (born 1977) is a French film director and screenwriter. She began her career as an actress before directing short films and music videos. In 2015, she directed her first feature film Bang Gang, a modern love story, which competed at the Toronto International Film Festival. She then directed the Palme d'Or-nominated film Girls of the Sun (2018), starring Golshifteh Farahani and Emmanuelle Bercot.

== Biography ==
Husson was born 1977 in Le Havre, Normandy. She is the daughter of two Spanish teachers, and the grandniece and the granddaughter of Spanish republican soldiers. The former, Ricardo Maso March, was a communist, and the latter, Albert Maso March, was an anarchist. They both helped establishing the French Resistance during World War II.

Her great-uncle Albert Maso March, also known as Alberto Vega, was an influent member of the POUM in Spain. He became its leader remotely while living in exile in France. In Paris, during the Nazi occupation, he created a defence service composed of ex-members of the POUM. This heritage inspired Eva to write Girls of the Sun, and to explore the theme of the resistance against fascist oppression.

Husson studied at the American Film Institute, whose alumni include Andrea Arnold, Terrence Malick and David Lynch. During her studies, she received several scholarships and prizes, such as the Franco-American Cultural Fund, the Mary Pickford award for Excellence in Directing, and the Multicultural Motion Picture Association award. Her thesis film, Hope to Die, was nominated at the Student Academy award at the American Society of Cinematographers, and screened in several festivals around the world (such as Tribeca, Deauville, Los Angeles).

== Career ==
Scouted in the street at the age of 14, she began her career in cinema as an actress, playing the role of Julie in the movie Les Romantiques, directed by Christian Zarifian in 1994. She then acted in La Révolution sexuelle n’a pas eu lieu, directed by Judith Cahen, in 1999.

In 2004, she wrote and directed Hope to Die, selected at the American Film Festival of Deauville, among others.

In 2013, Husson wrote and directed Those for Whom It's Always Complicated, an English-language comedy. Shot in Death Valley in five days with three actors, including her close collaborator Morgan Kibby, it awas shown in many festivals around the world and on the French/German TV channel Arte in 2014.

In 2015, after six years of work, she directed her first feature film Bang Gang (A Modern Love Story), produced by French-Iranian producer Didar Domehri. It competed at the Toronto International Film Festival, the London Film Festival, and the Jerusalem Film Festival, among others.

In 2015 she discovered the existence of Kurdish women fighters who had been captured and kept as sex slaves by Daesh. Inspired by the resilience of these women, and in an attempt to explore what it means to fight for an ideal, from her grandfather's personal story, she began writing her second feature film, Girls of the Sun, which tells the story of Bahar (Golshifteh Farahani), commandant of the Girls of the Sun, a battalion composed only of women fighters. The film was shot in Georgia from September to November 2017 and was part of the official competition at the 71st edition of the Cannes Film Festival, in 2018.

In 2021, Husson directed Mothering Sunday, starring Odessa Young, Josh O'Connor, Colin Firth and Olivia Colman.

== Filmography ==
Actress

Year	Title	Role
1994	Les Romantiques	Julie
1999	La Révolution sexuelle n'a pas eu lieu	Eva

Short film

Year	Title	Director	Writer	Producer	DoP
2004	Hope to Die	Yes	Yes	Yes	No
2013	Those for Whom It's Always Complicated	Yes	Yes	Yes	Yes

Feature film

Year	Title	Director	Writer
2015	Bang Gang (A Modern Love Story)	Yes	Yes
2018	Girls of the Sun	Yes	Yes
2021	Mothering Sunday	Yes	No

Television

Year	Title	Notes
2020	Hanna	3 episodes
2025	The Stolen Girl	Miniseries (Also executive producer)

== Awards and nominations ==
- 2018 Official competition Festival de Cannes - Girls of the Sun
