= Last Orders =

1996 novel by Graham Swift

- First edition cover
- Author: Graham Swift
- Cover artist: Carol Sharp
- Language: English
- Publisher: Picador
- Publication date: 26 January 1996
- Publication place: United Kingdom
- Media type: Print (Hardback & Paperback)
- Pages: 304 pp (first edition, hardback)
- ISBN: 0-330-34559-1 (first edition, hardback)
- OCLC: 34367883

Last Orders is a 1996 novel by British writer Graham Swift. The book won the 1996 Booker Prize. In 2001, it was adapted for the film Last Orders by Australian writer and director Fred Schepisi.

The plot and style are influenced by William Faulkner's As I Lay Dying. In June 1996, Swift declared that it was a homage to Faulkner's book but there were various differences.

== Plot ==
The story makes much use of flashbacks to tell the convoluted story of the relationships between a group of war veterans who live in the same corner of London, the backbone of the story being the journey of the group from Bermondsey to Margate to scatter the ashes of Jack Dodds into the sea, in accord with his last wishes.

The narrative is split into short sections told by the main characters as well as updates along the journey at Old Kent Road, New Cross, Blackheath, Dartford, Gravesend, Rochester, Chatham Naval Memorial and Canterbury Cathedral.

The title 'Last Orders' not only refers to these instructions as stipulated in Jack Dodd's will, but also alludes to the 'last orders (of the day)'—the last round of drinks to be ordered before a pub closes, as drinking was a favorite pastime of Jack and his friends.

== Awards ==
Awards for Last Orders
Year	Award	Result	Ref.
1996	Booker Prize	Winner	
1996	James Tait Black Memorial Prize for Fiction	Winner	
1996	Whitbread Award for Novel	Finalist	
1998	International Dublin Literary Award	Shortlist	
