= Andrew Piddington =

British film director and screenwriter

Andrew J. Piddington (born October 18, 1949 in Romford, Essex) is an English film and television director, screenwriter, and producer.

== Career ==
He directed films such as Shuttlecock (1991), The Fall (1999), The Dinosaur Hunters (2002) and The Killing of John Lennon (2006). The low-budget The Killing of John Lennon starred Jonas Ball as Lennon's killer Mark David Chapman, and was screened at the Edinburgh and Rotterdam Film Festivals. In 1990 he directed the documentary Hidden Heritage: The Roots of Black American Painting featuring David Driskell, funded by the Arts Council of Great Britain and produced by Maureen McCue. In 1996 he directed the series SAS: The Soldiers' Story, featuring soldiers in different wars and locations in each of the seven episodes, including the Falklands War, the Gulf War, and in Northern Ireland.

== Personal life ==
Piddington was first married to Christine Spencer. He is currently married to Pearl Morrison, who has worked as a script adviser on his films, and the couple have two children.
