= Waterland (novel) =

1983 novel by Graham Swift

- First edition
- Author: Graham Swift
- Language: English
- Publisher: William Heinemann
- Publication date: 1983
- Publication place: United Kingdom
- Media type: Print (hardcover)
- Pages: 310 pp
- ISBN: 0-434-75330-0
- OCLC: 10052188
- Dewey Decimal: 823/.914 19
- LC Class: PR6069.W47 W3 1983b

Waterland is a 1983 novel by Graham Swift published by William Heinemann. It is set in the Fens of eastern England. It won the Guardian Fiction Prize, and was shortlisted for the Booker Prize.

In 1992, it was adapted into a film of the same name, directed by Stephen Gyllenhaal and starring Jeremy Irons.

== Plot summary ==
The plot of the novel revolves around loosely interwoven themes and narrative, including the attraction of the narrator's brother to his girlfriend/wife, a resulting murder, a girl having an abortion that leaves her sterile, and her later struggle with depression. As an adult woman, she abducts a baby.

This personal narrative is set in the context of a wider history, of the narrator's family, the Fens in general, and the eel.

Tom Crick, fifty-two years old, has been history master for some thirty years in a secondary school in Greenwich, London. Tom has been married to Mary for as long as he has been teaching, but the couple have no children. Pressured by the school, Tom changes his teaching approach to telling tales drawn from his own recollection.

Tom's wife is arrested for taking a baby. The publicity that attends her arrest reflects badly on the school, and Tom is told that he now must retire. In response, he uses his impending forced retirement as an excuse to recount a story to his students. The pivot of Waterland focuses on both the past in 1943, and the present time thirty years after – all related through the eyes of Tom as an adolescent.

The novel addresses some three hundred years of local history – including that of Tom's family – this relates to the broader historical currents of past centuries. It refers to smuggling and the isolation in the small towns of the Fens.

Much of the contemporary plot centres on Tom's tumultuous relationship with Mary, both as teenagers and after their marriage. Tom's brother Dick is mentally handicapped; he grows jealous when they are teenagers because of his own attraction to Mary. She grew up on her father's farm, located near the house of Tom's family. Tom's father, a lock keeper, lives with his two sons in the lock-keeper's cottage, beside a tributary of the Great Ouse. Tom's mother dies when he is ten years old. Mary's mother had died during her birth, and she is confined by a rigid religious upbringing from her father in her childhood.

Mary and Tom slip into a relationship. Dick resents them. When she learns she is pregnant, Dick overhears and asks Mary if he is the father, but she tells him another boy, Freddie Parr, is the father. Dick fights with a drunken Freddie, who drowns after Dick pushes him into the river. Mary and Tom go to an old woman for an abortion, which leaves Mary sterile. Her father forces her into seclusion for three years. Eventually, she and Tom reunite and marry after the Second World War. Tom begins his teaching career while Mary works in an old people's home.

In the present day, Tom returns the child to its mother. Mary is arrested and committed to a mental institution.

The plot closes on Dick's breakdown following the revelation that he was born from the incestuous relationship his grandfather forced on his daughter. His adoptive father has never really accepted him. Dick becomes drunk, rides away on his motorbike and throws himself in the water. His death haunts Tom for the rest of his life.

== Film adaptation ==
In 1992, a film version of Waterland was released, directed by Stephen Gyllenhaal and starring Jeremy Irons. The adaptation retained some major plot points but moved the contemporary location to Pittsburgh, and eliminated many of the extensive historical asides.
