= Elisabeth Robinson =

American novelist

Elisabeth Robinson is an American novelist, screenwriter and film producer. She is the author of The True & Outstanding Adventures of the Hunt Sisters, a national and New York Times bestseller. The epistolary novel, her first, was published in the US by Little, Brown and translated into ten languages.

== Biography ==
In New York, Robinson worked as a film executive for United Artists, Sundance, and the Lee Rich Company at Warner Bros, before moving to Los Angeles to accept a VP post at MGM. There she worked on such films as The Lover, Getting Even with Dad, and Goldeneye. Robinson left MGM to oversee development and production at The Ladd Company at Paramount Pictures. The company produced two Brady Bunch films and the five-Oscar-winner Braveheart. In 1998, she left Los Angeles to write and produce films independently.

Dividing time between London and New York, Robinson has produced, among other films, the Bill Murray comedy The Man Who Knew Too Little and Last Orders, based on the Booker Prize-winning novel by Graham Swift. In 2002, Variety named her one of the "Top Ten Producers To Watch." Robinson has written original screenplays for Paramount and Sony Pictures, adapted Lee Tulloch's Fabulous Nobodies and worked with Nick Broomfield on Ronan Bennet's The Catastrophist.

Since 2005, MORE magazine has commissioned Robinson to write adventure travel stories, including a motorcycle trip down the Ho Chi Minh trail; elephant riding in southern India; hiking the Tour du Mont Blanc; boating in Venice, and fly-fishing in Montana. She has also published articles in Vogue, Glamour, The Boston Review and the New York Times.

Robinson was born in Royal Oak, Michigan and graduated from Oberlin College. She lives in New York City.
