= The Light of Day (Graham Swift novel) =

2003 novel by Graham Swift

- First edition
- Author: Graham Swift
- Language: English
- Publisher: Hamish Hamilton
- Publication date: 2003
- Publication place: United Kingdom
- Media type: Print
- Pages: 256
- ISBN: 0-241-14204-0

The Light of Day is a 2003 novel by English author Graham Swift, published seven years after his previous novel, the Booker Prize winner Last Orders.

== Plot introduction ==
The book is set in 1997 in Wimbledon, the narrator George preparing to visit the grave of Bob Nash in Putney Vale Cemetery on the second anniversary of his death, and then to visit Sarah who was convicted of his murder and with whom George has fallen in love. George recounts his involvement in the crime, employed by Sarah as a private investigator to ensure that Bob's affair with Kristina, a Croatian refugee, had come to an end.

== Reception ==
The novel divided opinion:

- Hermione Lee writing in The Guardian praises the novel as having 'a brilliantly slow, precise, careful structure, covering "every hour, every minute, every detail" of its case with as much control as it lays out its geography and deals with its parts of speech. Within this tight little map, the story it has to tell is wildly extreme, sensational and romantic.'
- James Wood in the London Review of Books is also impressed: "The Light of Day is as close to seeming spoken as any novel I have read. It dares the ordinariness of flat, repetitious, unliterate narration... Swift’s dare is worth the risks, however. The book’s pleasures, slowly coddled, take time to mature, but in the process they teach you the art of reading slowly and carefully, of maturing with the story... Out of this apparently limited material and apparently limited style, Swift coaxes a novel of solemn depths."
- Michiko Kakutani in The New York Times is more critical, however: "The book is meticulously crafted, deftly moving back and forth in time to build suspense, but there is something lugubrious and solipsistic about its delivery. Mr. Swift puts us in the head of his narrator -- a downtrodden British private eye and disgraced former cop named George Webb -- for the entire book, and it proves to be a highly claustrophobic place to be. Worse, he allows George to natter on at needless length about his hopes and doubts, turning what might have been a slender, elegant book into a puffy, self-important volume" and concludes in wishing the novel "were a good 40 pages shorter".
- Anthony Quinn also writing in The New York Times is also critical: "It is difficult to reconcile the fact of so much writerly achievement with the feeling that the novel is somewhat underpowered" and that the author "has become a master of word-paring, phrase-clipping and scene-whittling, and the austerity of his style feels like a perfect fit with the voice of his laconic detective. Yet in cleaving to this scrupulous technique, he has skimped on the more obvious satisfactions of excitement and suspense. The pages turn, but the pulse never quickens."
