= England and Other Stories =

2014 collection of short stories by Graham Swift

- First edition
- Author: Graham Swift
- Cover artist: 'Beachy Head' by Eric Ravilious
- Language: English
- Publisher: Simon & Schuster
- Publication date: 2014
- Publication place: United Kingdom
- Media type: Print
- Pages: 288
- ISBN: 1-47113-739-2

England and Other Stories is a 2014 collection of 25 short stories by the author Graham Swift.

== Background ==
Swift said in The Guardian:

All these stories are bits of England but they are bits of different Englands. England now is such a heterogenous, indefinable place. I like the title England and Other Stories because what a lot of people think of as England may be just a story now. I myself am obviously unequivocally and indigenously English, I was born in England and I'm very attached to my country. But I think as a writer all the time I'm approaching it as though it might be a strange place."

== Stories ==
- Going Up in the World - 57-year-old Charlie Yates from Wapping jogs on Sunday mornings in Greenwich Park and then meets with his friend Don to play golf. He was a high-rise construction worker but now washes their windows in Docklands.
- Wonders Will Never Cease - The narrator was now married to Patti, but then his childhood friend Aaron asked him and Patti to be the witness at their wedding in Birmingham. Aaron's new wife Wanda (pun) was a talented 800-metre runner and hoped to qualify for the Olympics.
- People are Life - Greek-Cypriot Vangel is a barber, and his last customer of the day's mother has recently died. Vangel tries to sympathise but struggles to make a connection...
- Haematology - On 7 February 1649, 7 days after the execution of Charles I, William Harvey the royal physician writes to his cousin Edward Francis a lawyer and follower of Oliver Cromwell.
- Remember This - Lisa and Nick were now married and wrote their will together. That night Nick wrote his first and only love letter to his wife, but never gave it to her. Years later they separated, as Nick looked back at the love letter...
- The Best Days - At their headmasters, funeral Andy and Sean recognised fellow pupil Karen Shields, whose mother Sean had sex with...
- Half a Loaf - A widowed Osteopath quickly cured a lower back problem for Tanya, a woman less than half his age. He asked her to have dinner with him and every week since then Tanya has spent the night with him, but Tanya has got a boyfriend.
- Saving Grace - Cardiologist Dr Shah was born in Battersea, his father was born in Poona, India and joined up with the Indian Army during World War II to fight with the British. His Father took part in D-Day but was injured and hospitalised where he met a nurse Rosie who became his wife.
- Tragedy, Tragedy - In the morning break Mick talks about the word 'tragedy' and its improper use in newspaper headlines. Bob also has doubts about its usage, following the death of a colleague having a heart-attack driving a fork-lift at work.
- As Much Love as Possible - Sue was going out with her girlfriends, leaving her husband Alan at home. His friend Bill arrived but Alan forgot to order Sue a taxi. So Bill dropped Sue off in his car where they sat for a while...
- Yorkshire - Daisy and Larry were sleeping in separate rooms after their adult daughter Addy revealed that her father had molested her as a child. Larry was going to sort things out with the police the next day, while Daisy could not really believe it had happened...
- Holly and Polly - The couple are clinical embryologists, 'introducing sperms to eggs', where they fall in love with each other, 'in the right place' to have babies.
- Keys - John dropped his wife Clare off at the station as her brother is gravely ill. On returning home he is locked out, realising that he left the keys inside. The neighbour is on holiday but their cleaner Olga is there, so she lets him in next door and he spends the night with her.
- Lawrence of Arabia - Her husband has recently died, She remembers that on the bus returning from hospital, Peter O'Toole died on the front pages of the papers, he was most famous as portraying Lawrence of Arabia.
- Ajax - The narrator, as a small boy, was the next door neighbour to Mr Wilkinson. Describing his neighbour as being a 'weirdo' one day the narrator brought Ajax scouring powder to help Mr Wilkinson to unblock his drain, which led to the disappearance of Mr Wilkinson, and the narrators interest in Greek mythology.
- Was She the Only One - Set in the First World War a young woman wears her husband's white shirt. When he returns from the front he suffers from shell-shock and believes his wife has had an affair...
- Knife - Daniel is considering taking a knife from a kitchen drawer to prove himself to be allowed in a gang, with 'the brothers'.
- Mrs Kaminski - A doctor is trying to check Polish Mrs Kaminski after she had a fall in the street, but they are both getting confused both by language and by her family.
- Dog - He was 56 years old but felt half his age, pushing his young daughter in a park. Then a vicious dog attacked a child in a buggy, he reacted quickly and pulled the dog away, kicking it several times.
- Fusilli - Whilst shopping in Waitrose his son Doug had called him from Helmand in Afghanistan, encouraging him not to use fresh pasta, to 'try fusilli' instead. Before Christmas, Doug had been killed, so his parents did not celebrate Christmas that year.
- I Live Alone - David Eliot was a lawyer in Winchester but had live alone since the drowning of his wife Anne when their sailing boat was wrecked in a storm off The Needles. Years later he suffered a blackout, on investigating, his doctor told him he had a rare condition and he only had months to live.
- Articles of War - In 1805 a young officer arrives at Plymouth to depart on the Temeraire, to face the war with the French.
- Saint Peter - His father was a vicar in St. Peter's church in the suburbs of Birmingham, but died when he was a child. He remembers his father vividly telling him the story about Saint Peter.
- First on the Scene - Terry suffered from Parkinson's disease which meant that he and his wife Lynne then went by train to go on walks in the countryside. Then Lynne died and he continued walking using the train. Then he found the body of a young woman in a clearing.
- England - Driving on Exmoor a coastguard sees an old BMW stuck in a gully in the early morning. The driver is an Afro-Caribbean comedian from Dewsbury on his way to a gig in Ilfracombe who says that he avoided colliding with a young deer in the middle of the road.

== Reception ==
Erica Wagner from the New Statesman writes "There is something irrevocable about all of us being here, this book reminds us. Wherever we come from, here we are: it is our actions and the way we tell our stories that will define us. If David Cameron wishes to consider further the notion of British values, he could do worse than turn to Swift’s compact, thought-provoking tales. They offer the complex enlightenment that only good fiction can provide."

In The Observer, Lucy Scholes concludes "As a collection, these initially disparate-seeming stories come together to build a coherent and cohesive whole; whether the same can be said for the lives depicted, Swift seems less sure. "What a terrible thing it can be just to be on this Earth," thinks a lonely widower who discovers a dead body on a solitary country walk. "First on the scene" for the only time in his life – but having dialled the emergency services, he's lost for words."

Valerie Martin explains in The New York Times: "There's something bright and rewarding about this tendency to consider both the connotation and the denotation of words as they appear in random thoughts. And it is this that I take, though it isn't on my list, to be a prime signifier of Englishness. Shakespeare's characters engaged in it, and here they are still, in Swift's stories: rich and poor, soldiers, sailors, barbers, lawyers, doctors, all given to following a casual word to its source. This rich, lively collection reminds me of what my grandfather didn't want his son ever to forget: an English education."

Matthew Dennison in The Spectator starts his review with "A calculated ordinariness unites the protagonists in Graham Swift’s new collection of short stories. In each of these mini fictions, as in his novels, Swift revisits his conceit of the narrator as man (or woman) on the Clapham omnibus. Invariably he endows these blank ciphers with aspects of the extraordinary — percipience, insight or understanding — or exposes them to feelings and events which place them in extraordinary positions and offer them opportunities to behave remarkably while remaining apparently run of the mill. Swift revels in the trappings of Pooterishness while denying his protagonists Mr Pooter’s silliness. His vision may be contrived but it never patronises. The experience of these stories rescues Swift’s ‘ordinary’ men and women from stereotype, a moral in itself."

M John Harrison in The Guardian writes "This is a sharp, beautiful collection: every story quick and readable but leaving in the memory a core, a residue, of thoughtfulness. Some are wicked, some are funny; others, such as "Was She the Only One" or "Fusilli", encapsulate a huge but numbly personal crisis; some manage all three at once. Some feel old-fashioned, but as if more than one layer of time is involved – as if you're reading a 1950s story mimicked in a pastiche of a TV drama from the 1970s. There are a few duds, but Swift's practice – which is to make a world in a dozen pages, sometimes less; a world in a bottle – carries the reader quickly through and on to the next. His touch is so light and craftsmanlike, his scene shifts so subtle, his emotional logic so incontrovertible, that sometimes we hardly notice where they have taken us until too late".
