= Graham Swift =

English writer (born 1949)

Graham Swift FRSL
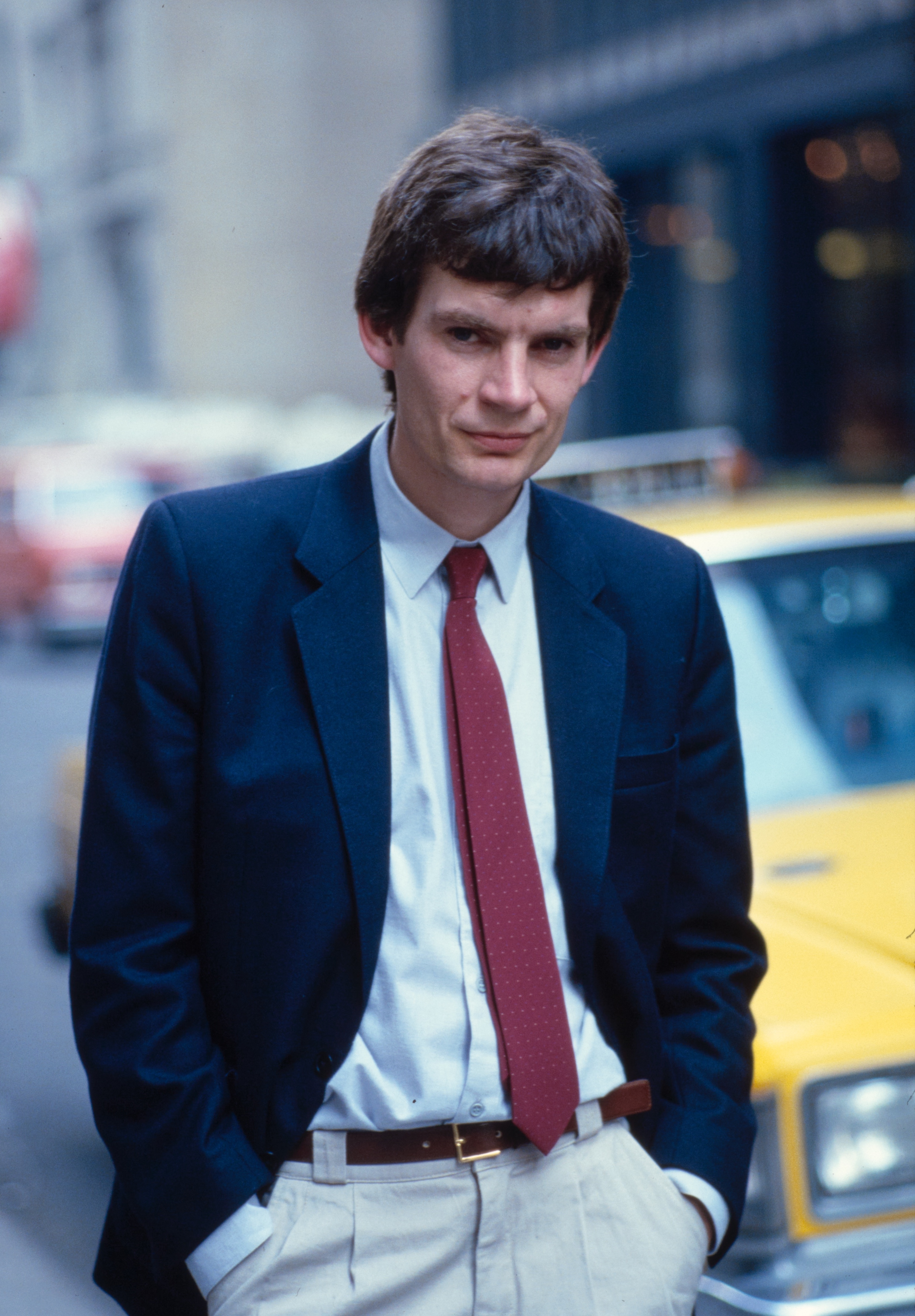
- Swift in the early 1980s
- Born: Graham Colin Swift; 4 May 1949 (age 77); London, United Kingdom
- Education: Croydon Grammar School (1954–1960); Dulwich College (1960–1966)
- Alma mater: Queens' College, Cambridge
- Occupation: Writer
- Spouse: Candice Rodd
- Children: 0
- Writing career
- Years active: 1970s—present
- Genres: Novel, Poem, Short story
- Notable works: Waterland; Mothering Sunday
- Notable awards: Geoffrey Faber Memorial Prize; 1983; Guardian Fiction Prize; 1983; Winifred Holtby Memorial Prize; 1983; Grinzane Cavour Prize; 1987; Prix du Meilleur Livre Étranger; 1994; James Tait Black Memorial Prize; 1996; Booker Prize; 1996; Hawthornden Prize; 2017
- Movement: Postmodernism

Graham Colin Swift FRSL (born 4 May 1949) is an English novelist, poet and short story writer.

His first novel – The Sweet-Shop Owner – was published in 1980. His second novel – Shuttlecock – was published the following year, and won the 1983 Geoffrey Faber Memorial Prize. He followed this with Learning to Swim and Other Stories, in 1982. Swift's third novel – Waterland – won the 1983 Guardian Fiction Prize, the 1983 Winifred Holtby Memorial Prize, the 1987 Grinzane Cavour Prize and was shortlisted for the 1983 Booker Prize. He followed this with his fourth novel – Out of This World – which was published in 1988. His fifth novel – Ever After – was published in 1992, and won the 1994 Prix du Meilleur Livre Étranger.

Swift's sixth novel – Last Orders – won the 1996 Booker Prize and was a joint winner of the 1996 James Tait Black Memorial Prize in the fiction category. His seventh novel – The Light of Day – was published in 2003, while his eighth novel – Tomorrow – was published in 2007. Making an Elephant: Writing from Within appeared in 2009, and contained non-fiction and some of Swift's poetry. His ninth novel – Wish You Were Here – was published in 2011, while England and Other Stories was published in 2014. His tenth novel – Mothering Sunday – was published in 2016, and won the 2017 Hawthornden Prize. His eleventh novel – Here We Are – was published in 2020.

Swift was elected a Fellow of the Royal Society of Literature in 1984. His books have been translated into more than twenty languages, and many have been adapted for the screen. The British Library bought his archive in exchange for £100,000 in 2009.

== Early life ==
Swift was born on 4 May 1949, somewhere between Sydenham and Catford in south-east London, to Allen Stanley Swift and Sheila Irene (née Bourne), although his family moved to Croydon when Swift was still a boy. He was the youngest of two sons, whose mother had been reared in Upper Sydenham, whilst his father was reared in a nearby working class district down the hill. Allen Stanley Swift worked as a minor civil servant at the National Debt Office in London, eventually rising to become a bookkeeper, having previously been a decorated fighter pilot.

According to Swift, none of his relatives had been writers, and he "didn't grow up in an environment that would have led me towards writing or anything artistic". Of his youth he said he was "certainly not from the classic unhappy childhood" of many's a writer, praised his mother as "a great bringer-up of children" and that he experienced "a sense of security and comfort" as a child.

== Education ==
Swift was educated at Croydon Grammar School between 1954 and 1960. He then attended Dulwich College until 1966, having won a scholarship in 1960. An English teacher there remembered Swift reading John Skelton and Sir Thomas Wyatt at the age of 13, and completing an exercise on The Canterbury Tales by Geoffrey Chaucer, but – also: "He didn't say anything unless he had to. There was an athletics-based house system, and Graham suffered a little under it".

From 1967, Swift continued his education at Queens' College, Cambridge, having won another scholarship, At Cambridge he was for a brief time editor of college journal Solstice. He graduated from Cambridge with a BA (a First) in 1970. According to the Encyclopædia Britannica, Swift completed an MA at the same institution in 1975, although – according to a detailed 2003 profile in The Guardian – he spent the years between 1970 and 1973 at the University of York.

According to the same profile in The Guardian, Swift was supposed to be working on a PhD titled "The role of the City in 19th-century English literature" while attending the University of York. He later described his PhD efforts as "bogus", adding he had "just did enough to convince people that I was working on something", but – in reality – spent the time "teaching myself to write". To escape this pretence he left England to live in Greece, soon returning to his home country to work on the fiction that would make him his name.

== Writing ==
Swift has been described as "a quintessentially English writer, writing about English subjects and English themes". His books have been translated into more than twenty languages. The seaside is often to be found in his fiction, including in Last Orders (1996) and Here We Are (2020). According to his wife in the 2003 profile in The Guardian, Swift does not engage in research ahead of writing a book. Swift confirmed this himself to The Observer in 2009, dismissing research as "a great destroyer of the imagination." Instead he rises early and takes up his work in an office, where his tools are fountain pens – manufactured by Waterman – black-ink cartridges and Oxford A4 paper feint-ruled pads.

=== Beginnings ===
Swift's earliest published work was short stories in journals, particularly The London Magazine. That publication's editor – Alan Ross – asked if Swift had any "more substantial" writing planned. Swift did; he was secretly working on The Sweet-Shop Owner – his first novel – which was published in 1980. Swift was 31 at this time, and "had destroyed several earlier efforts". The Sweet-Shop Owner's protagonist, Willy Chapman, is a middle-aged man with angina who awaits both death and the return of his daughter Dorry. It is set in Clapham. Because of a delay in publication, Swift had a second novel – Shuttlecock – ready by the following year. Shuttlecock's protagonist is Prentis – the son of a catatonic man in a mental institution. This novel won the 1983 Geoffrey Faber Memorial Prize. 1982 brought the publication of Learning to Swim and Other Stories – Swift's first collection, and his last to appear until 2014.

Swift's third novel – Waterland – was published in 1983, a pivotal year in his career. A novel of landscape, history and family set in The Fens, it is often cited as one of the outstanding post-war British novels, and has been a set text on the English literature syllabus in British schools. Writer Patrick McGrath asked Swift during an interview about the "feeling for magic" contained within Waterland. Swift responded: "The phrase everybody comes up with is magic realism, which I think has now become a little tired.... there's no doubt that English writers of my generation have been very much influenced by writers from outside who... have got this magical, surreal quality, such as Borges, Márquez, Grass... we are, as ever, terribly parochial, self-absorbed and isolated, culturally, in this country. It's about time we began to absorb things from outside." Waterland won the 1983 Guardian Fiction Prize, the 1983 Winifred Holtby Memorial Prize and the 1987 Grinzane Cavour Prize. It was also shortlisted for the Booker Prize, losing to Life & Times of Michael K by J. M. Coetzee. At the close of 1983 Swift was included in the Granta Best of Young British Novelists list.

=== Middle years ===
Swift published his fourth novel – Out of This World – in 1988. It used experimental alternating monologues to tell the story of war photographer Harry Beech and his father who lost an arm in the First World War. British critics – attuned to Waterland – did not like Swift's innovations, nor were they enthused by Swift's fifth novel – Ever After – which appeared in 1992, and focused on the character of Bill Unwin. However, it won the 1994 Prix du Meilleur Livre Étranger in France.

Swift dedicated his sixth novel – Last Orders – to his father who had died in 1992. Set in Bermondsey, it concerns a group of men who make an expedition from London to Margate. In this book, Swift deployed Bermondsey vernacular in a "gentle and evocative" manner, but – while this decision did not impress everyone – the novel won the 1996 Booker Prize, and was also a joint winner of the 1996 James Tait Black Memorial Prize in the fiction category. Then, in 1997, an obscure Australian academic emphasised alleged similarities in plot and structure to As I Lay Dying by William Faulkner, and the matter was taken up by British newspaper The Independent on Sunday. Among those to defend Swift against such charges was Faulkner's fellow Nobel laureate Sir Kazuo Ishiguro, who wrote: "It is quite wrong to say Last Orders borrows the plot of As I Lay Dying. It borrows only the premise: namely, a group of people go on a journey to take the remains of a loved one to a resting place... Swift's plot – that is, what actually happens in the book – bears no resemblance to Faulkner's. The two books have not one common incident, dialogue exchange or twist. The endings are completely different. No character in Last Orders resembles any in As I Lay Dying. These two fine works are related solely by (1) the premise, and (2) the technical device of having the characters take turns to narrate the story... Last Orders does no more than what countless books, movies, paintings and musical works have always done, and will continue to do, that is, to allude to an established classic for its own purposes".

=== Later years ===
Swift's seventh novel – The Light of Day – was published in 2003. Set in Wimbledon, it has a detective named George as its protagonist. Swift's eighth novel – Tomorrow – was published in 2007, and revolves around a woman who lies awake, contemplating a revelation she is about to make to her twin children on the titular day.

Published in 2009 when Swift was aged 59, Making an Elephant: Writing from Within includes non-fiction pieces – a first book of this type for Swift – including an account of his sheltering of Salman Rushdie after Ruhollah Khomeini – an ayatollah – declared a fatwa against Rushdie in 1989. It also contains some of Swift's poetry. The titular mammal is a toy made by Swift.

His ninth novel – Wish You Were Here – was published in 2011, with Boyd Tonkin describing it as "quietly commanding". Set in 2006, it features the return of a dead soldier to England. Rosemary Goring – writing in The Herald – described it as "cruelly absent from any prize list" that followed.

England and Other Stories – Swift's first short story collection for more than 30 years – was published in 2014. Swift's tenth novel – Mothering Sunday – was published in 2016. Set in 1924, it follows a maid as she secretly shares the titular day with her lover who is set to marry another woman. Hermione Lee noted "an erotic precision and intensity that is new in Swift's work". It won the 2017 Hawthornden Prize.

Swift's eleventh novel – Here We Are – was published in 2020.

== Archive ==
Swift's archive – including drafts of novels – is available at the British Library, having been acquired in return for £100,000 in 2009. International critics and scholars almost immediately began to seek access. Jamie Andrews – the British Library's head of modern literary manuscripts – said Swift would "unquestionably be seen as one of the pre-eminent writers of the English post-war period".

== Awards and honours ==
- 1983: Geoffrey Faber Memorial Prize winner, Shuttlecock
- 1983 Guardian Fiction Prize winner, Waterland
- 1983: Winifred Holtby Memorial Prize winner, for Waterland
- 1984: Fellow of the Royal Society of Literature
- 1987: Grinzane Cavour Prize winner, Waterland
- 1994: Prix du Meilleur Livre Étranger winner, Ever After
- 1996: James Tait Black Memorial Prize joint winner, Last Orders
- 1996: Booker Prize winner, Last Orders
- 2017: Hawthornden Prize winner, Mothering Sunday

== Personal life ==
Swift has been described as "a profile-writer's nightmare because he is quiet and stable... engrossed in his writing".

He lives in South London with his wife, Candice Rodd, whom he met in 1975 while both were at the University of York. According to her, they were opposites: he (supposedly) working on a PhD, she an undergraduate; he "very quiet and intense", she "frivolous and loud". She was also "appalled" initially, when she realised they both came from the same area, as she "didn't want to meet people from south London".

Swift was acquainted with Ted Hughes – the Poet Laureate.

== Works ==
=== Novels ===
- The Sweet-Shop Owner (1980) ISBN 0-7139-1247-2
- Shuttlecock (1981) – winner of the 1983 Geoffrey Faber Memorial Prize ISBN 0-7139-1413-0
- Waterland (1983) – winner of the 1983 Guardian Fiction Prize, 1983 Winifred Holtby Memorial Prize, 1987 Grinzane Cavour Prize and shortlisted for the 1983 Booker Prize ISBN 0-434-75330-0
- Out of this World (1988) ISBN 978-0-6708-20849
- Ever After (1992) – winner of the 1994 Prix du Meilleur Livre Étranger ISBN 0-330-32331-8
- Last Orders (1996) – winner of the 1996 Booker Prize ISBN 0-330-34559-1
- The Light of Day (2003) – long-listed for the 2003 Booker Prize ISBN 0-241-14204-0
- Tomorrow (2007) ISBN 978-0-330-45018-8
- Wish You Were Here (2011) ISBN 978-0330-53583-0
- Mothering Sunday (2016) – winner of the 2017 Hawthornden Prize ISBN 1-4711-55234
- Here We Are (2020) ISBN 1-47-118893-0

=== Short story collections ===
- Learning to Swim and Other Stories (1982) ISBN 978-0-904-38846-6
- England and Other Stories (2014) ISBN 1-47113-739-2
- Twelve Post-War Tales (2025) ISBN 978-1-398-53548-0

=== Short stories ===
- "Blushes". The New Yorker. 11 January 2021.
- "Fireworks". The New Yorker. 17 January 2022.
- "Hinges". The New Yorker. 14 November 2022.
- "Bruises". The New Yorker. 25 September 2023.

=== Non-fiction ===
- Making an Elephant: Writing from Within (2009) ISBN 978-0-330-45101-7

== Adaptations ==
Swift has permitted screen adaptations of several of his books, but has always viewed the money as buying time to work on his next book.

Waterland was adapted into a film of the same name in 1992. Stephen Gyllenhaal directed and Ethan Hawke, Jeremy Irons and Sinéad Cusack acted. Swift was not impressed, describing the experience as "the movie business at its crassest".

Shuttlecock was adapted into a film of the same name in 1993.

Last Orders was adapted into a film of the same name in 1996.

Mothering Sunday was adapted into a film of the same name in 2021, acted by Olivia Colman and Colin Firth and featuring Glenda Jackson. Work began on it five years previously, before the novel had even been published.
