= Trieste Science+Fiction Festival =

Italian cinematographic festival

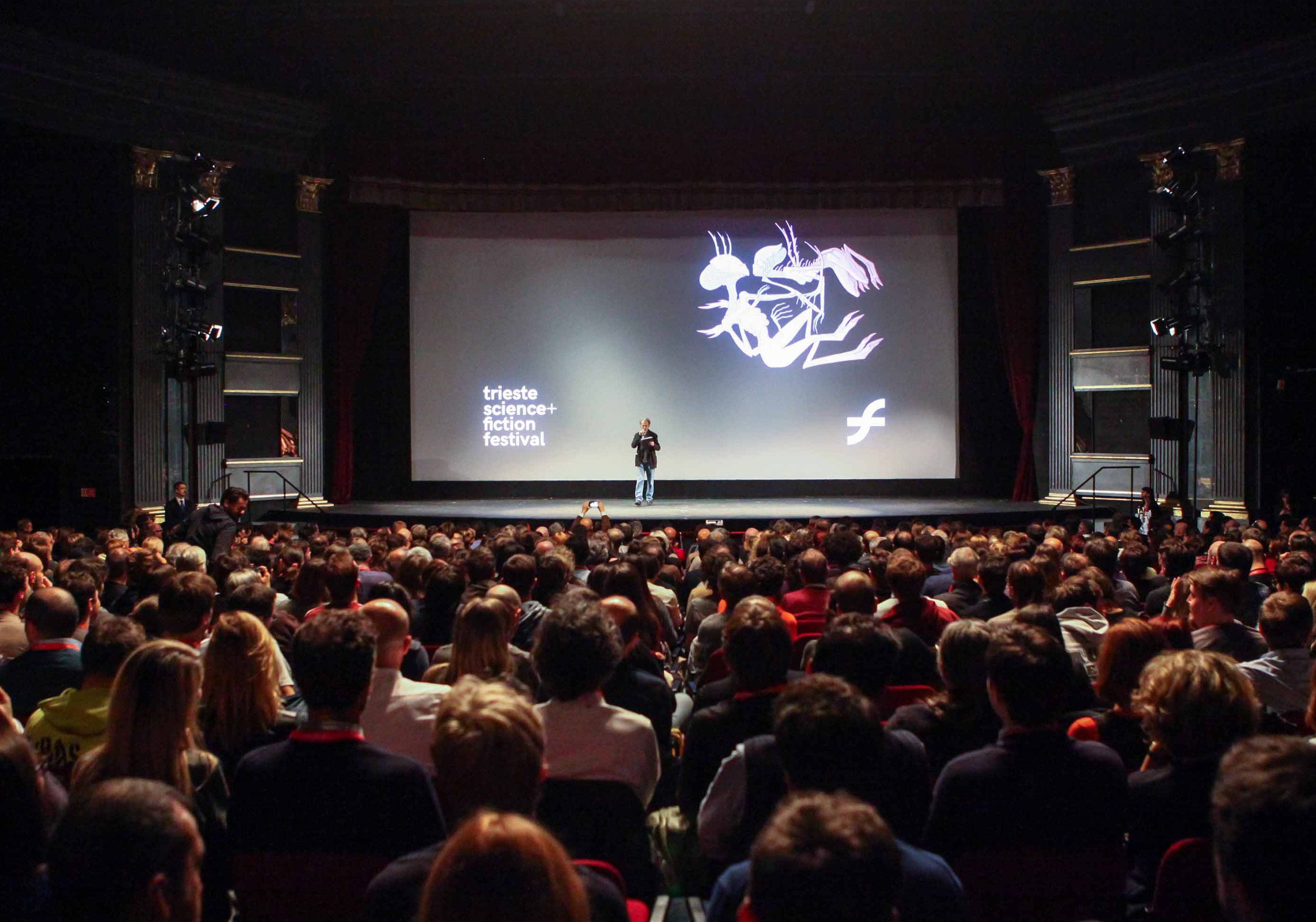
- Trieste Science+Fiction Festival 2016
- Location: Trieste, Italy
- Founded: 2000
- Hosted by: La Cappella Underground
- Festival date: November
- Website: sciencefictionfestival.org

Trieste Science+Fiction Festival was founded in 2000 under the name of Science plus Fiction by the Research and Experimentation Centre La Cappella Underground with the ambitious purpose of re-launching the Festival Internazionale del film di fantascienza (International Science Fiction Film Festival), which had been held in the northern Italian city of Trieste in the years 1963–1982.

It is a multidisciplinary event devoted to the realms of the "fantastic", to experimental languages and new technologies in cinema, television and the visual arts. With a program rich in screenings, retrospectives, tributes, conferences and meetings with renowned international and national professionals, it aims to explore the whole range of the science fiction world, from cinema to comics, as well as literature to stage performances.

Todd Brown describes it as "not just one of the world's leading science fiction festivals", but "one of the finest genre events in the world regardless of the genre in question", while Dan Jolin lists it as one of the "14 captivating film festivals in Europe you won't want to miss".

Trieste Science+Fiction Festival annually awards the Asteroide to the best international feature film in competition. Moreover, in cooperation with the Méliès International Festivals Federation, it also awards the Méliès d'argent (Silver Méliès) to the best European feature and short films in competition.

== History ==
In 1963, a group of "young visual poetry artists"—as they were called by the Italian poet Giuseppe Ungaretti in a greeting telegram still in the archives of La Cappella Underground—founded the Festival Internazionale del Film di Fantascienza (International Science Fiction Film Festival), a revolutionary event that brought many renowned international stars to the city of Trieste. In those years, the festival saw the participation of Arthur C. Clarke, Roger Corman (whose X: The Man with the X-ray Eyes was awarded the Astronave d'argento (Silver Spacecraft) in 1963), Riccardo Freda, Forrest J. Ackerman, Umberto Eco (one of the 1963 Jury members) and Brian Aldiss, among others. In the following years, the event would turn the city of Trieste into a unique stage for genre films. In 1982, the Festival Internazionale del Film di Fantascienza abruptly came to an end.

Later in 2000, La Cappella Underground decided to pick up the tradition of the festival, presenting independent film productions, premières, and rarities to the audience in a new event called Science plus Fiction.

In 2002, the Urania d'Argento (Silver Urania) Career Achievement Award was created in cooperation with Arnoldo Mondadori, editor of the sci-fi and fantasy magazine Urania. The first Silver Urania Award went to Italian director Pupi Avati. Over the years the Award was bestowed to: Dario Argento (2003), Jimmy Sangster (2004), Lamberto Bava (2005), Enki Bilal and Terry Gilliam (2006), Joe Dante (2007), Ray Harryhausen (2008, via videoconference from London), Roger Corman and Christopher Lee (2009), George A. Romero (2011), Alfredo Castelli (2012), Gabriele Salvatores (2013), Alejandro Jodorowsky (2014), Bruce Sterling (2015), Rutger Hauer (2016), Sergio Martino (2017), and Douglas Trumbull (2018). In 2019, the name of the Award was changed to Asteroide Lifetime Achievement Award and was bestowed to Phil Tippett. Then in 2021, the Award was bestowed to Abel Ferrara.

In 2004, the Festival picked up a new challenge of restoring the forgotten icon of the event that inspired it: the Asteroide Award, historical prize of the Festival internazionale del film di fantascienza in Trieste. The award to the best film in competition was called Asteroide d'Oro (Golden Asteroid). It was designed and crafted every year by a different artist (e.g., Nino Perizi and Marcello Mascherini), whose fame and talent was as exceptional as that of the sci-fi films and celebrities taking part in the Festival.

In 2005, Science plus Fiction became part of the Méliès International Festivals Federation, a network which includes all the main events in the field and aims at the promotion of the European genre production on a big scale.

In 2007, the festival updated its name to Science+Fiction. Since then, it has been characterized by an increasing range of events, including not only film screenings but also side events related to science fiction (round tables, scientific conferences, concerts and stage performances, art exhibitions, and literary events).

In 2009, Trieste Science+Fiction Festival launched the Méliès competition for feature films in addition to the competition of the same name reserved to short films.

The film schedule has always included a wide range of proposals bound to attract both fans and newcomers to the science fiction, horror and fantasy genres. As of 2019, besides the official section—"Neon"—that includes the latest releases and film premières in and out of competition, the Festival presents classic films, short films in and out of competition ("European Fantastic Shorts" and "Fantastic Shorts" sections), "Spazio Italia" (a showcase of science-fiction and fantasy Italian productions), and science (fiction) documentary films with follow-up meetings ("Futurologia" section).

The retrospectives organized by the Festival are, including but not limited to: Brit Invaders! (2003–2005), on British science fiction from the 1960s to the present day; Marx Attacks! (2007, 2009), a showcase of Russian and Eastern European productions; FantaEspaña (2002), curated by Carlos Aguilar with a focus on Spanish science-fiction films; Voyage Fantastique (2006–2008), a journey into French science-fiction, in collaboration with the Institut Français in Milan and the Embassy of France in Italy; and Fant'America (2009), a tribute to Edgar Allan Poe, two hundred years from his birth.

The event reaches a grand total of more than 20,000 spectators per year.

== Awards ==
=== Asteroide ===
Year	Title	Director	Country
2004	Able Edwards	Graham Robertson	United States
2005	Puzzlehead	James Bai	United States
2006	Manga	Peter Khazizov	Russia
2007	Timecrimes (Spanish: Los cronocrímenes)	Nacho Vigalondo	Spain
2008	Before the Fall (Spanish: Tres días)	F. Javier Gutiérrez	Spain
2009	First Squad: The Moment of Truth	Yoshiharu Ashino / Misha Shprits / Aljoscha Klimov	Japan / Russia / Canada
2010	Transfer	Damir Lukacevic	Germany
2011	Monsters	Gareth Edwards	United Kingdom
2012	Errors of the Human Body	Eron Sheean	Germany / United States
2013	Europa Report	Sebastián Cordero	United States
2014	Time Lapse	Bradley D. King	United States
2015	Wyrmwood	Kiah Roache-Turner	Australia
2016	Embers	Claire Carré	United States / Poland
2017	The Man with the Magic Box	Bodo Kox	Poland / Italy
2018	Freaks	Zach Lipovsky / Adam B. Stein	Canada
2019	Aniara	Pella Kågerman / Hugo Lilja	Sweden / Denmark
2020	Sputnik	Egor Abramenko	Russia
2021	Gaia	Jaco Bouwer	South Africa
2022	The Artifice Girl	Franklin Ritch	United States
2023	Mars Express	Jérémie Périn	France
2024	U Are the Universe	Pavlo Ostrikov	Ukraine
2025	Redux Redux	Kevin McManus & Matthew McManus	USA

=== Méliès d'argent – feature films ===
Year	Title	Director	Country
2009	The Children	Tom Shankland	United Kingdom
2010	Rare Exports: A Christmas Tale	Jalmari Helander	Finland
2011	L'arrivo di Wang	Manetti Bros.	Italy
2012	Grabbers	Jon Wright	United Kingdom / Ireland
2013	The Strange Colour of Your Body's Tears (French: L'étrange couleur des larmes de ton corps)	Hélène Cattet / Bruno Forzani	Belgium / France / Luxembourg
2014	Index Zero	Lorenzo Sportiello	Italy
2015	Polder	Samuel Schwarz / Julian M. Grunthal	Switzerland / Germany
2016	The Sum of Histories (Flemish: Terug Naar Morgen)	Lukas Bossuyt	Belgium
2017	Loop (Hungarian: Hurok)	Isti Madarász	Hungary
2018	Man Divided (Danish: QEDA)	Max Kestner	Denmark / Sweden / Finland
2019	Extra Ordinary	Mike Ahern / Enda Loughman	Ireland / Belgium
2020	The Trouble with Being Born	Sandra Wollner	Austria / Germany
2021	Warning	Agata Alexander	United States / Poland
2022	LOLA	Andrew Legge	UK
2023	The Last Spark of Hope (Polish: W nich cała nadzieja)	Piotr Biedroń	Poland
2024	After Us, The Flood (Finnish: Jälkeemme vedenpaisumus)	Arto Halonen	Finland
2025	The Shrinking Man (French: L'Homme qui rétrécit)	Jan Kounen	France/Belgium

=== Méliès d'argent – short films ===
Year	Title	Director	Country
2005	Terra Incognita	Peter Volkart	Switzerland
2006	Final Journey	Brendan Muldowney	Ireland
2007	Absence	Kevin Lecomte	France
2008	Kingz	Benni Diez / Marinko Spahic	Germany
2009	Virtual Dating	Katia Olivier	Belgium
2010	Daddy's Girl	Helen Komini Olsen	Norway
2011	Out of Erasers (Swedish: Sudd)	Erik Rosenlund	Sweden / Denmark
2012	Employé du mois	Olivier Beguin	Switzerland
2013	Happy B-Day	Holger B. Frick	Germany
2014	The Nostalgist	Giacomo Cimini	United Kingdom
2015	The Kármán Line	Oscar Sharp	United Kingdom
2016	Getting Fat in a Healthy Way	Kevork Aslanyan	Bulgaria
2017	The Last Schnitzel	Kaan Arici / Ismet Kurtulus	Denmark
2018	Thunder From a Clear Sky (French: Orage par ciel clair)	Yohan Faure	France
2019	This Time Away	Magali Barbé	United Kingdom
2020	The Recycling Man	Carlo Ballauri	Italy
2021	The Exit Plan	Angus Wilkinson	Australia / United Kingdom
2022	68.415	Antonella Sabatino & Stefano Blasi	Italy
2023	What-if-I	Lavinia Tommasoli/Pietro Traversa	Italy
2024	Où va le monde	Mickaël Dupré	France
2025	Animalia	Marius Rolfsvåg	Norway

== See also ==
- Science fiction film
- List of fantastic and horror film festivals

=== Other sci-fi film festivals ===
- Boston Science Fiction Film Festival
- Sci-Fi-London
- International Horror and Sci-Fi Film Festival
