= The Works (American TV program) =

- Presented by: Daniel H. Wilson
- Country of origin: United States
- Original language: English
- No. of seasons: 1
- No. of episodes: 10

Production
- Running time: 44 minutes (without commercials)

Original release
- Network: History Channel
- Release: July 10 – September 25, 2008

The Works is an American television program that aired on History Channel from July to September 2008. Each episode of the program focuses on the history and processes used for common objects and services.

== Overview ==
The host Daniel H. Wilson "puts the everyday under a microscope to reveal unseen secrets and history, and finding enough fascinating facts that would make anyone scratch their head in amazement".

== Episodes ==
No.	Title	Original release date	Prod. code
1	"Garbage"	July 10, 2008	TBA
Follows how garbage is handled, from your door to the landfill or recycling.
2	"Steel"	July 17, 2008	TBA
3	"Power Tools"	July 24, 2008	TBA
4	"Beer"	July 31, 2008	TBA
5	"Sneakers"	August 7, 2008	TBA
6	"Guns and Ammo"	August 14, 2008	TBA
7	"Tattoos"	August 21, 2008	TBA
While explaining about tattoos, Daniel gets his own tattoo based on the cover of his book, How to Survive a Robot Uprising.
8	"Motorcycles"	August 28, 2008	TBA
9	"Skydiving"	September 19, 2008	TBA
10	"Robots"	September 25, 2008	TBA

== Broadcast history and availability ==
The first eight episodes of The Works aired at 10 pm ET on Thursday nights. Episode nine aired on a Friday at 8 pm ET, and episode ten the following Thursday at 8 pm ET.

Several episodes are available for free at the History Channel web site and on some video on demand services.

Episodes are also available, for a fee, through iTunes.
