= Hole in the Sky =

Hole in the Sky may refer to:

- Hole in the Sky (festival), a metal music festival held in Bergen, Norway
- "Hole in the Sky" (song), a song by Black Sabbath from their 1975 album Sabotage
- "Hole in the Sky" (Voltron: Legendary Defender), an episode of Voltron: Legendary Defender
- Hole in the Sky (novel), a 2025 novel by Daniel H. Wilson

== See also ==
- Black hole
- Ozone hole, the polar holes in the ozone layer
