= Amped (novel) =

2012 novel by Daniel H. Wilson

- First edition
- Author: Daniel H. Wilson
- Cover artist: Will Staehle
- Language: English
- Genre: Science fiction
- Publisher: Doubleday
- Publication date: June 5, 2012
- Publication place: United States
- Media type: Print (Hardcover)
- Pages: 274
- ISBN: 978-0-385-53515-1
- LC Class: PS3623.I57796 A83 2012

Amped is a science fiction novel by American author Daniel H. Wilson published in June 2012.

== Synopsis ==
In a near-future where the Neural-Autofocus and other neural implants made formerly mentally challenged individuals into equals or superiors to those with normal brain functionality, Owen is a high school teacher whose surgeon father helped develop the implants to control his epilepsy. When the United States Supreme Court rules that implanted individuals are no longer a protected class, Owen's life is changed forever, as he discovers that his implant has a very dangerous secret.

== Reviews ==
Kirkus Reviews stated this about the novel, "Wilson delivers a thoughtful, well-written novel, which, like his previous novel Robopocalypse (2011), deals with the often tense interplay between machines and humans. Unfortunately, while he nails the machine part, the human part falls a little short. The characters lack depth, and a crucial romantic relationship feels forced and unearned. The plot is thin, too, hewing too closely to archetype. Wilson, whose prose is always a step above the norm, is at his strongest creating amp-augmented action sequences and in conjuring situations which explore the boundaries between humankind and its technological creations."

It also calls the overall novel "Provocative, with strong action sequences, but weak in character development and plotting."

The Boise Weekly states, "On the whole...Amped is a compelling and brisk read with a lot more to offer than the average thriller."
