= Booker T. Washington High School (Oklahoma) =

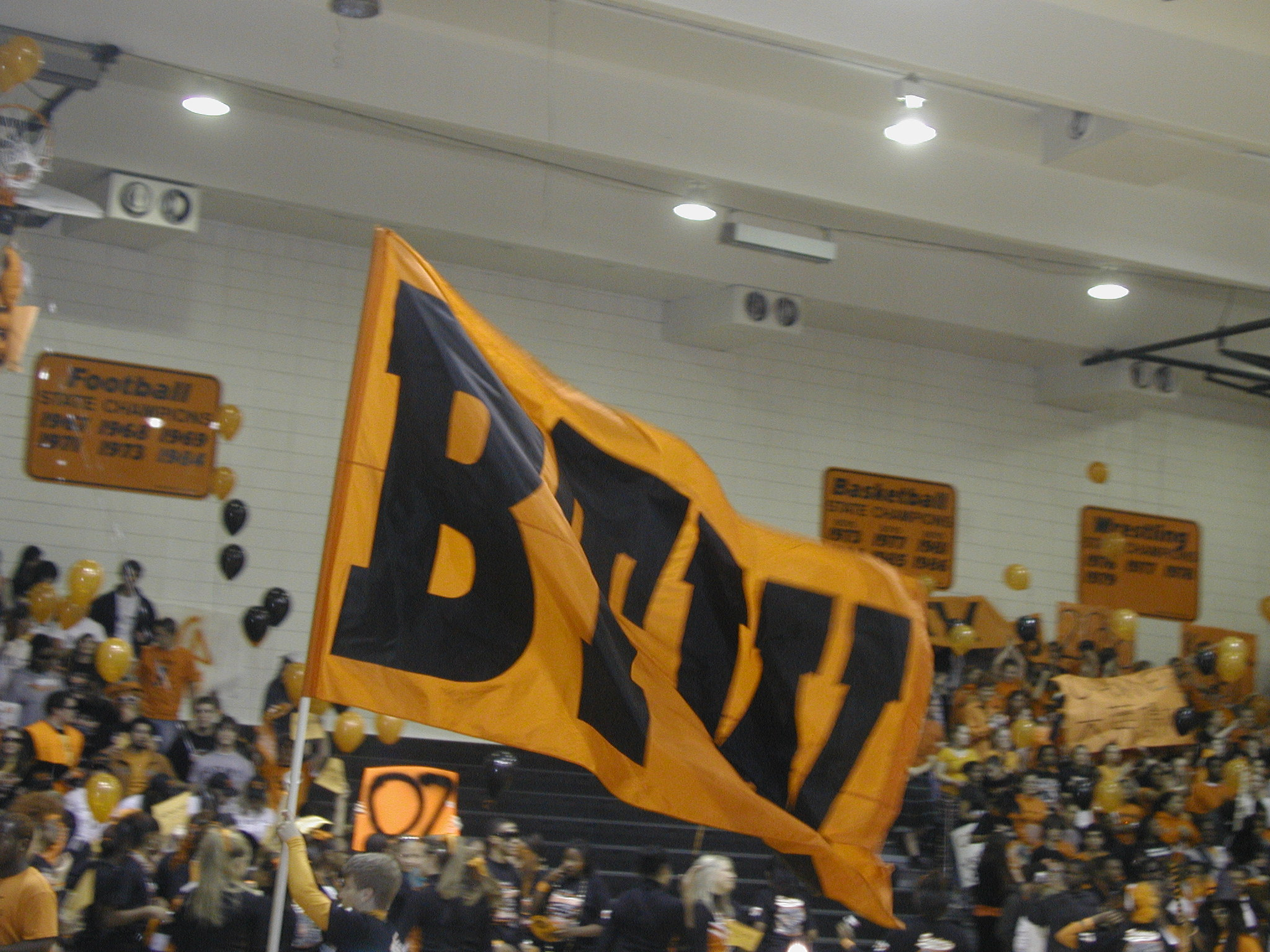
- Booker T. Washington pep rally

Location
- 1514 East Zion Street; Tulsa, Oklahoma 74106; United States; 36.188205°N 95.971009°W

Information
- Type: Co-Educational; public; secondary; special education
- Established: 1913
- School district: Tulsa Public Schools
- NCES District ID: 4030240
- CEEB code: 373590
- NCES School ID: 403024001583
- Principal: James Cooper
- Teaching staff: 62.42 (FTE)
- Grades: 9-12
- Enrollment: 1,302 (2024-2025)
- Student to teacher ratio: 20.86
- Campus: Urban
- Colors: Orange and black
- Athletics: Basketball, baseball, cross country, football, soccer, softball, swimming, tennis, volleyball, track
- Athletics conference: OSSAA Class 5A
- Mascot: Hornets
- USNWR ranking: 1,153
- Website: btw.tulsaschools.org

Booker T. Washington High School is a high school in Tulsa, Oklahoma, United States. It was named after the African-American education pioneer Booker T. Washington. It is part of the Tulsa Public Schools system.

== Overview ==
Booker T. Washington is a public high school, established as a magnet school, that accepts students based on their academic merit, rather than geographical location. The school uses applicants' middle school grades and attendance record, as well as their Iowa Tests of Educational Development scores, to determine admission. To ensure greater ethnic, economic, and intellectual diversity, students who live in historically minority and economically depressed neighborhoods are offered preferential consideration.

== History ==
Oklahoma statehood brought about segregated schools for African-American children. The first such school in Tulsa was a two-room wooden building built in 1908 on Hartford Avenue, between Cameron and Easton Streets. It served grades 1 through 8 until 1913. In that year, Dunbar Grade School opened at 504 Easton Street in an 18-room brick building, with a four-room frame building that served as a high school.

Booker T. Washington High School was founded in 1913, with a class of fourteen students and a staff of two teachers. The principal was E.W. Woods, a native of Louisville, Mississippi, who had just moved to Tulsa from Memphis, Tennessee. According to legend, Woods walked all the way from Tennessee to Oklahoma when he learned the new school was advertising for a principal. The original school building was at the corner of Elgin Avenue and Easton Street, in the Greenwood district of Tulsa.

By 1920, the four-room high school had been replaced by a three-story brick building. This continued to operate for nearly three decades.

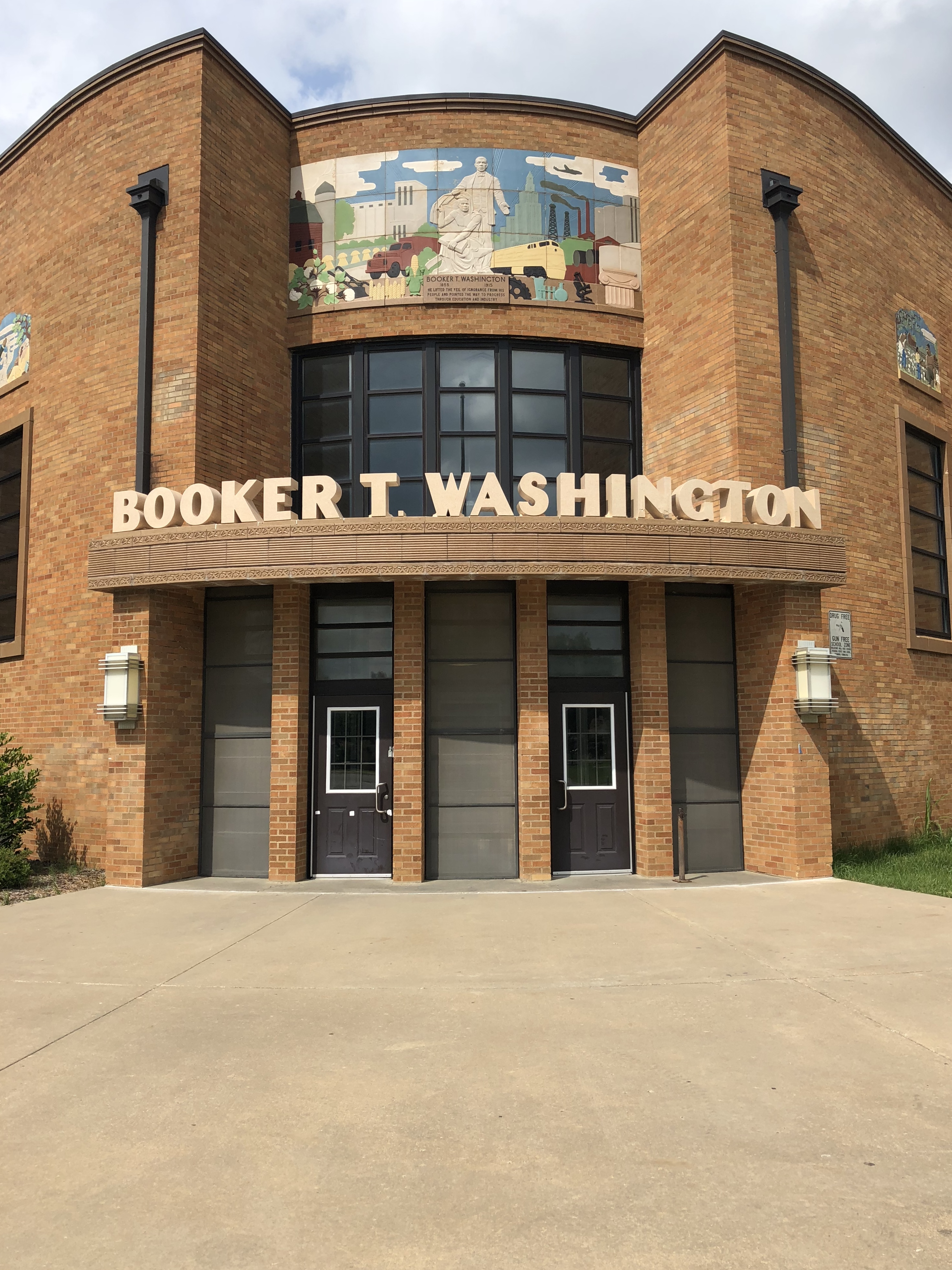
Original building, Booker T. Washington High School

=== Tulsa Race Massacre ===
The high school escaped destruction during the Tulsa Race Massacre of 1921. Immediately after the massacre, the American Red Cross used the building as its headquarters for relief activities. About 2,000 people were temporarily sheltered there. A hospital facility was set up, along with a dental clinic, a venereal disease clinic, and a medical dispensary. The Red Cross inoculated about 1,800 refugees against tetanus, typhoid and smallpox.

=== Desegregation ===
The Tulsa Public Schools district was slow to react to the U.S. Supreme Court ruling that de jure racial segregation was unconstitutional in the Brown v. Board of Education decision in 1954, and the Civil Rights Act of 1964, which outlawed all racial segregation in the United States. During the 1970-71 school year a small number of progressive Caucasian students voluntarily transferred to Booker T. Washington in a special program called "Metro." The program was successful as a proof that voluntary desegregation would work at Booker T. Washington High. In 1973 Booker T. Washington was chosen to be the vehicle for Tulsa's school desegregation program. Tulsa was - and still is - racially divided along north–south lines, and the school was in historically African-American north Tulsa, making this the first integration program in a historically African-American school.

The Tulsa School Board established a system of desegregation busing. As part of this policy, Booker T. Washington became a magnet school; it no longer had a home neighborhood from which students were accepted. Students instead had to apply for admission and were drawn from across the district. A racial quota system was established and, until the 2004–2005 school year, 45% of the students accepted identified themselves as "white," 45% as "black," and 10% came from other ethnic categories. However, in 2003, the Supreme Court ruled in Grutter v. Bollinger and Gratz v. Bollinger that quota systems constituted racial discrimination and violated the Constitution. Booker T. Washington High School accepted the ruling and eliminated their quota system in favor of a system based on geography. Due to Tulsa's regional demographics, this system is calibrated to maintain a similar racial distribution to the old quota system.

=== Present day ===
The fourth home of the Booker T. Washington High School opened at 1631 E. Woodrow Place in September 1950, graduating its first class in 1951. That building was replaced by a new one at the same location in 2003.

Booker T. Washington was one of the first Tulsa public high schools to offer Advanced Placement courses and began offering the International Baccalaureate program in 1983.

The 2003–2004 school year marked the 90th anniversary of Booker T. Washington and the dedication of a new $25 million, 250,000-square-foot (23,000 m^{2}) school building. This building was designed to encompass the rich heritage of the school and tried to incorporate many themes from the previous facility. A portion of the original building has been preserved.

== Academics and administration ==
Booker T. Washington is accredited by the International Baccalaureate Organization (IBO) to grant the IB Diploma to students who complete the two-year programme. Booker T. also offers many Advanced Placement courses. Advanced Placement and International Baccalaureate courses are taught in English, math, social studies, science, computer health, foreign language, and the arts.

Booker T. Washington High School was part of a study by the Education Trust and the ACT. Published in 2005, On Course for Success focused on high performing, diversely populated schools that provide students with college-preparatory courses, qualified teachers, flexible teaching styles, and extra tutorial support. The study identified specific academic skills that should to be taught to high school students to prepare graduates for college. The study focused on English, math, and science courses, and claimed that Booker T. Washington was "doing things right."

As of 2024, the school offers five world languages: Spanish, French, German, Chinese, and Japanese. Spanish and French are offered through level V while German, Chinese, and Japanese are offered through level IV. In 2005, 81% of the student body was enrolled in a world language, and 10% was enrolled in a level IV language class or higher. Booker T. Washington has active exchange programs with China, Japan, Russia, Germany, Mexico, Paraguay, Venezuela, India, and many European countries.

In 2010, Booker T. Washington placed 74th in Newsweek magazine's list of the top 100 public high schools in the US. The magazine ranked high schools according to the ratio of Advanced Placement or International Baccalaureate tests taken by all students to the number of graduating seniors.

=== State championships ===
- Academic Bowl 21: 1985, 1991, 1992, 1994, 1996, 1997, 1999, 2000, 2002, 2003, 2004, 2006, 2007, 2008, 2011, 2012, 2013, 2016, 2019, 2020, 2021, 2026
- Speech and Debate 10: 1978, 1979, 1996, 1997, 1998, 1999, 2000, 2012, 2013, 2015

=== National championships ===
- Academic Bowl: 1992 and 2008
- NFL Lincoln Douglas Debate: 1983
- NFL Poetry Interpretation: 1998
- NFL United States Extemporaneous Speaking: 2013, 2014, 2016

== Athletics ==
Booker T. Washington has won 53 state championships. Several former school athletes have gone on to the NFL and NBA, such as Wayman Tisdale and Robert Meachem. Booker T. plays home football games at S.E. Williams Stadium.

In 2011, Booker T. Washington's 2010–2011 repeat 5A State Championship basketball team was ranked No. 20 in the RivalsHigh100 top basketball teams in the nation.

=== State championships ===
- Boys' basketball 16: 1973, 1977, 1981, 1984, 1985, 1986, 1987, 1995, 1996, 1997, 1999, 2001, 2002, 2010, 2011, 2019, 2025
- Girls' basketball 3: 2008, 2009, 2013, 2017
- Football 9: 1967, 1968, 1969, 1971, 1973, 1984, 2008, 2010, 2017
- Boys' soccer 7: 1985, 1992, 1997, 1998, 2000, 2001, 2008, 2025
- Girls' soccer: 2018, 2019
- Boys' swimming: 3: 1981, 1985, 2018
- Boys' track 4: 1970, 1979, 1982, 1984
- Girls' track 9: 1974, 1990, 1992, 1993, 1994, 1997, 2004, 2005, 2010
- Wrestling 4: 1976, 1977, 1978, 1979
- Volleyball 2: 1976, 2011

== Notable alumni ==
=== Miscellaneous ===
- Earl Bostic – jazz & R&B saxophonist
- Brennan Brown – actor, Chicago Med and The Man in the High Castle
- Josh Fadem – comedian, actor (30 Rock, Better Call Saul)
- John Hope Franklin – historian and recipient of the Presidential Medal of Freedom
- Allan Heinberg – film scriptwriter, wrote scripts for Grey's Anatomy, writer for Marvel Comics, screenwriter of Wonder Woman (2017)
- Judy Eason McIntyre – state senator for District 11 in Oklahoma
- Denver Nicks – journalist and author
- Dan Piraro – syndicated cartoonist: Bizarro
- Thaddeus Strassberger – opera director
- Amber Valletta – model and actress
- Charlie Wilson (1971) – R&B singer-songwriter-producer and the former lead vocalist for The Gap Band; collaborator of Kanye West, Snoop Dogg, R. Kelly, Justin Timberlake, and will.i.am
- Daniel H. Wilson – columnist for Popular Mechanics and author of How to Survive a Robot Uprising: Tips on Defending Yourself Against the Coming Rebellion

=== Athletics ===
- Mark Anderson – NFL 2006 159th overall NFL draft pick, defensive end, Chicago Bears, Houston Texans, New England Patriots University of Alabama
- Jordan Brailford – 2019 253rd overall NFL draft pick, outside linebacker, Washington Redskins
- Roy Foster – MLB outfielder, Cleveland Indians, 1970–1972
- Reuben Gant – 1974 18th overall NFL draft pick, tight end (Buffalo Bills)
- Daxton Hill – 2022 31st overall NFL draft pick, defensive back, Cincinnati Bengals
- Justice Hill – 2019 113th overall NFL draft pick, running back, Baltimore Ravens
- Ryan Humphrey – NBA, former professional basketball player, played basketball at Notre Dame and Oklahoma
- Felix Jones – 2008 22nd overall NFL draft pick, running back, Dallas Cowboys, 2008–12; 2006 and 2007 All-America (as kick returner), University of Arkansas
- J. W. Lockett – NFL, fullback, Dallas Cowboys and Montreal Alouettes
- Tyler Lockett – 2015 69th overall NFL draft pick, wide receiver and returner, Seattle Seahawks, 2011 and 2014 All-American at Kansas State University; father Kevin Lockett and uncle Aaron Lockett also went to Booker T. Washington and both played in the NFL
- Tommy Manning – runner and member of 2010 U.S. Mountain Running Team
- Garrick McGee – offensive coordinator, University of Illinois
- R. W. McQuarters – NFL 1998 28th overall NFL draft pick (San Francisco 49ers), cornerback, New York Giants, 2006–08, 2008 Super Bowl winner with Giants
- Robert Meachem – 2007 27th overall NFL draft pick, wide receiver, New Orleans Saints, 2010 Super Bowl winner with Saints; 2006 All-America, University of Tennessee
- Kenny Monday – freestyle and folkstyle wrestler; 1988 Olympic welterweight gold medalist and 1992 Olympic welterweight silver medalist; 2x NCAA champion
- Michael Nsien – MLS, defender, Los Angeles Galaxy (2005); USL Championship head coach, FC Tulsa (2018–2022); head coach, United States Soccer Federation U-19 MYNT
- Etan Thomas – 2000 12th overall NBA draft pick (Dallas Mavericks), forward/center, Washington Wizards, 2000–09; 2000 Big East Conference Defensive Player of the Year, Syracuse University
- Bryce Thompson – college basketball player
- Wayman Tisdale – 1985 2nd overall NBA draft pick (Indiana Pacers), forward, 1985–1997, multiple teams; 1983, 1984 and 1985 first-team All-America, University of Oklahoma; 1984 Olympic gold medalist; jazz bassist and recording artist
- Gentry Williams – NCAA, cornerback, Oklahoma Sooners

== Notable faculty ==
- Tom Adelson – state senator, teaches Political Philosophy
- Shea Seals – head basketball coach, former NBA player
- John Waldron – social studies teacher, elected state representative, 2018

== See also ==
- List of things named after Booker T. Washington
