= The 3 Million =

Immigrant rights group

the3million
- Named after: Estimated number of EU migrants to UK
- Formation: 2016; 10 years ago
- Founded at: Bristol
- Type: Advocacy group
- Region served: United Kingdom
- Key people: Monique Hawkins, Andrea Dumitrache, Kezia Tobin, Daphne Giachero, Sarah Maramag, Ola Sobieraj, Nicolas Hatton, Ilse Mogensen, Axel Antoni, Maike Bohn, Christophe Gaspard, Alexandra Bulat, Luke Piper, Germana Canzi, Kuba Jablonowski, Lara Parizotto, Dimitri Scarlato, Costanza De Toma, Dahaba Ali Hussein, Katia Widlak, Fizza Qureshi, Arnas Tamasauskas.

the3million was established in the United Kingdom as a grassroots movement of EU citizens in the UK, in reaction to the developing Brexit policy landscape in the aftermath of the 2016 United Kingdom European Union membership referendum. The organisation's name was a reference to the estimated number of EU citizens who have moved from another member state to live in the United Kingdom. However, the3million did not take a specific stance on whether the United Kingdom should leave or remain in the European Union and instead the organisation primarily existed to "work with MPs and organisations across the political spectrum on the specific issue of protecting citizens’ rights." According to Politics Means Politics magazine, the organisation was the largest group representing EU citizens in the UK.

== Stated aims and principles ==
=== Aims ===
The group seeks to provide a support network for EU citizens who are resident in the United Kingdom. Its aims are to:

- "Defend the right of EU27 citizens to live, work, study, raise families, and vote in the UK as they do now - whatever the outcome of Brexit."
- "Protect EU citizens’ rights through advocacy in UK and EU institutions, influencing public opinion, and mobilising European and British citizens."
- "Ensure that EU27 citizens in the UK know their rights and are empowered to stand up for them."

=== Principles ===
The3million positions itself as a group which not only represents and advocates on behalf of EU migrants in the United Kingdom, but which is composed of members of this same population.

The organisation does not take a stance on whether the United Kingdom should remain in, or leave, the European Union.

== Activities ==
At a national level, the organisation works with UK politicians on a range of issues related to migration, and has presented evidence to Migration Advisory Committee's inquiry into Freedom of Movement. Vulnerable EU citizens seeking advice on applying to the EU Settlement Scheme are referred to the organisation through the UK government's online visa and immigration support service. On a local level, in collaboration with regional authorities, the3million has provided information events and support for EU migrants affected by the UK's changing relationship with Europe. In this regard, the3million has been recognised by the Institute for Government for its involvement as a user group which facilitates interface between the UK government and EU citizen stakeholders.

=== Legal actions ===
In July 2019, the3million issued a judicial review challenge to the Data Protection Act 2018's ‘immigration exemption’.This was dismissed by the High Court in October 2019, and has been subsequently appealed. The3million has also taken legal action concerning EU citizens being allegedly denied their voting rights in the UK's May 2019 European Parliament elections.

== Organisation ==
The3million exists as a not-for-profit organisation and is a limited company, it was incorporated on 27 November 2017. It is officially registered to an address in Bristol. According to a March 2019 filing, the organisation employs 5 people (including directors) and had net assets of £54,560.

=== Support and funding ===
The organisation receives support and funding from: Joseph Rowntree Foundation, Greater London Authority, International Organization for Migration, The Paul Hamlyn Foundation, NPC, and Unbound.

== Media coverage ==
The Guardian describes the3million as "a grassroots campaign for EU citizens’ rights" and it has reported extensively on the organisations legal challenges to the UK government concerning the rights of EU migrants. The organisation is routinely quoted in reference to developments concerning the rights of EU citizens in the UK, particularly regarding the settlement scheme, and has received coverage in Newsweek, Wired, The Independent, Euronews, Huffington Post, and The National, and Business Review.
