= The Mad Scientist Hall of Fame =

Semi-satirical non-fiction book

Mad Scientist Hall of Fame: Muwahahahaha!
- Author: Daniel H. Wilson and Anna C. Long
- Cover artist: Daniel Heard
- Language: English
- Genre: Science fiction, Comedy novel
- Publisher: Citadel
- Publication date: August 1, 2008
- Publication place: United States
- Media type: Print (Paperback)
- Pages: 224 pp
- ISBN: 0-8065-2879-6

The Mad Scientist Hall of Fame: Muwahahahaha! is a semi-satirical non-fiction book by Daniel Wilson and Anna C. Long published in August 2008.
