= How to Build a Robot Army =

Semi-satirical non-fiction book by Daniel Wilson

How to Build a Robot Army: Tips on Defending Planet Earth Against Alien Invaders, Ninjas, and Zombies
- Author: Daniel H. Wilson
- Cover artist: Richard Horne
- Language: English
- Genre: Science fiction, Comedy novel
- Publisher: Bloomsbury
- Publication date: December 26, 2007
- Publication place: United States
- Media type: Print (Paperback) and AudioBook (audio cassette, MP3 CD, and audio-CD)
- Pages: 176 pp
- ISBN: 1-59691-281-2

How to Build a Robot Army: Tips on Defending Planet Earth Against Alien Invaders, Ninjas, Monsters, and Zombies is a semi-satirical non-fiction book by Daniel Wilson published in December 2007.

== Summary ==
Daniel H. Wilson’s third book is obviously fiction, but contains a lot of useful information nonetheless. How to Build a Robot Army: Tips on Defending Planet Earth Against Alien Invaders, Ninjas, and Zombies not only deals with how to reprogram household robots to defend against aliens but literally every imaginable monster. From vampires to Godzilla Wilson has you covered. With section titles such as "How to Slay a Vampire Clan" and "How to Repel Godzilla" there is no adversary that this book would leave you unprepared for. Although Annalee Newitz would beg to differ and "go out on a limb and claim that Earth is desperately unprepared for any kind of alien attack." Even though there is a section in the book that deals specifically with that scenario, "How to Thwart an Alien Invasion". Despite its apocalyptic aura the book is an easy read. The sections are all short and to the point with little to no flowery language but a lot of humor mixed in. Each section goes into describing what sort of attack you are facing and the monsters involved. Then looks at a typical personal robot that is available for reprogramming. The reprogramming goes in depth but again is easy to follow and stays on point to the hostile situation.

== Relevance in Science Fiction ==
This book, How to Build a Robot Army: Tips on Defending Planet Earth Against Alien Invaders, Ninjas, and Zombies, is similar to Daniel H. Wilson’s other works because it is heavily laden with accurate and possibly useful information. The easy-to-follow prose that Wilson uses in this book not only fully outlines how to properly reprogram a multitude of robotic devices but also entices young readers. In 2009 How to Build a Robot Army: Tips on Defending Planet Earth Against Alien Invaders, Ninjas, and Zombies was awarded the “2009 Quick Pick for reluctant Young Adult Readers” by the American Library Association (ALA). Obviously the book gets kids reading because it easily engages them. As Susan Lee Stutler says in her article “From The Twilight Zone to Avatar: Science Fiction Engages the Intellect, Touches the Emotions, and Fuels the Imagination of Gifted Learners” science fiction is interesting not only to gifted learners but all children because “Science fiction is rife with connections to the real world”{link to footnote} and the multitude of layers within each story. How to Build a Robot Army: Tips on Defending Planet Earth Against Alien Invaders, Ninjas, and Zombies is not a purely instructional book about robotics programming but follows many story lines each involving artificial intelligence. To bring up Stutler again science fiction is plainly this: “Advanced technology, artificial intelligence, extrasensory perception, mind control, fantastic future worlds, anti-utopian societies, strange extraterrestrials, intrepid travels through time and space, large-scale catastrophe, and the problem solving that comes with it—these are the elements of science fiction.” and Wilson’s How to Build a Robot Army includes all of these and more, the more being Godzilla.

== Awards ==
• Chosen by the American Library Association (ALA) as a “2009 Quick Pick for Reluctant Young Adult Readers."
