= Able Edwards =

2004 film by Graham Robertson

- Directed by: Graham Robertson
- Written by: Graham Robertson
- Produced by: Scott Bailey; Graham Robertson
- Starring: Scott Kelly Galbreath; Keri Bruno; David Ury; Steve Beaumont Jones; Michael Shamus Wiles
- Cinematography: Ricardo Palavecino
- Edited by: Graham Robertson
- Music by: Michael Suby
- Distributed by: Heretic Films Indie
- Release date: March 2004
- Running time: 85 minutes
- Country: United States
- Language: English
- Budget: $30,000

Able Edwards is a 2004 science fiction film directed by Graham Robertson and starring Scott Kelly Galbreath, Keri Bruno, David Ury, Steve Beaumont Jones, and Michael Shamus Wiles. Able Edwards follows the clone of a Walt Disneyesque entertainment mogul created to revive the glory days of his deceased predecessor's corporation. In the process of restoring reality entertainment to a synthetic, virtual world, the clone realizes he has yet to live as his own man.

== Plot ==
In the not so distant future, the world is faced with a global catastrophe. A biological contaminant is released into the atmosphere and over the following years, decimates nearly ninety percent of the world's population. Fleeing the poisoned planet, humanity relocates to a space station orbiting the Earth. It is there that life continues with the hope of one day returning to Earth.

The film takes place during a probate hearing concerning the distribution of the estate of Abel Edwards beta, a clone of the founder of the Edwards Corporation. The corporation is portrayed as a major entertainment conglomerate of the 20th century, operating a successful film and television studio alongside the Abel Edwards' Fantastic Wonderlands theme parks, which feature characters from Abel Edwards' animated films.

The EC has an extensive animatronic background and has morphed into a manufacturer whose significant product is the humanoid robot; their market share has fallen sharply and sales have softened. They understand the need to develop a new market, but after several failed attempts, recognize they lack the intuition and imagination necessary for the success of such a bold course change. As a last-ditch effort, their marketing department develops a plan to clone their dead genius founder, Abel Edwards. They will grow a genetic replica, and they will infuse him with the same life-altering experiences that shaped the original man. Nature plus nurture, or something like it.

Upon his 25th birthday, Edwards takes the reins of the company and rides a 20-year wave of success with every passing day. When the potential rival of the status quo career politician abruptly drops out of the race, Edwards sees his chance to expand beyond his defined boundaries and bring the 'Edwards Standard of Living' directly into people's living rooms, rather than maintaining a park to give them a transitory experience. When Edwards moves from a 'Celebrity Politician' to a front-running candidate, the power struggle reaches its breaking point.

The Anti-Reality Organizations finally have their scapegoat. He loses the Senate race in a landslide. Edwards has lost his son, the Senate seat and his position as CEO of the company. Edwards commandeers a space shuttle and heads for the site of the original Able Edwards Fantastic Wonderland beginning a journey of no return.

== Production ==
Able Edwards was conceived as a science fiction reinterpretation of Citizen Kane (1941). In a statement published by the Torino Film Festival, director Graham Robertson said, "I have always been struck by the idea of adapting old films to new scenarios."

The film was shot over 15 days on a budget of $30,000. The actors performed against a green screen, with the backgrounds added during post-production. According to Robertson, the production was planned around using inexpensive equipment and scanned photographs in place of physical sets. Some of the backgrounds were assembled from photographs obtained from library books, while others incorporated digital imagery.

Robertson completed much of the film's editing and compositing on a home computer using commercially available software, including Final Cut Pro, Adobe Photoshop and Combustion. Steven Soderbergh joined the production as an executive producer.

Robertson subsequently wrote Desktop Cinema: Feature Filmmaking on a Home Computer, a filmmaking guide using the production of Able Edwards to illustrate the process of making a feature film using consumer video equipment and a home computer. The book was published by Course Technology in 2006.

== Reception ==
Joe Leydon of Variety described Able Edwards as having a "potentially intriguing concept", but considered the finished film "an experimental misfire".

Other critics responded more favorably. Reviewing the film at the 2004 Torino Film Festival, Neil Young gave it 8 out of 10, praising Robertson's direction and the film's visual design. Young regarded its final sequence as particularly effective and praised its treatment of themes drawn from Citizen Kane.

Don R. Lewis of Film Threat praised the screenplay and Scott Kelly Galbreath's performance in the title role, although he noted that the quality of the visual effects was inconsistent. Lewis nevertheless considered the film an impressive achievement given its limited resources.

In a 2007 review for DVD Talk, Preston Jones praised Robertson's ambition but criticized several of the supporting performances, the musical score and the technical limitations of the production. Jones considered the film memorable, although he felt that its individual elements did not come together successfully.

Able Edwards won the Asteroide Award at the 2004 Trieste Science+Fiction Festival, where it was selected as the best film in the festival's Neon competition.
