= The Andromeda Evolution =

2019 science fiction novel by Daniel H. Wilson

- First edition cover
- Author: Daniel H. Wilson
- Cover artist: Will Staehle
- Language: English
- Genre: Techno-thriller
- Publisher: HarperCollins
- Publication date: November 12, 2019
- Publication place: United States
- Media type: Print (hardcover and paperback)
- Pages: 384
- ISBN: 0-062-47327-1

The Andromeda Evolution is a 2019 novel written by Daniel H. Wilson. It is a sequel to Michael Crichton's The Andromeda Strain, published 50 years prior in 1969. It is the nineteenth novel under Crichton's name, and the fourth novel published after Crichton's death.

== Plot ==
Fifty years after the events of The Andromeda Strain an anomaly is discovered in the Amazon rainforest. A team made up of Nidhi Vedala, Harold Odhiambo, Peng Wu and Sophie Kline are selected to investigate the anomaly. James Stone, the son of original Andromeda incident scientist Jeremy Stone, is chosen as a last-minute replacement on the team by overseer General Stern based on a hunch. The team is dispatched to the Amazon, minus Kline, who is an American astronaut residing at the International Space Station. The team are supported and protected by mercenary Sergeant Brink and his team of local guides. It is established that the original Andromeda strains AS-1 and AS-2 are common knowledge among world governments, all of whom are looking to exploit and weaponise it - the ISS contains an entire secret module designed to be 100% sterile used to investigate and experiment on the AS variants, but global government suppression has limited public knowledge of AS to such a degree where Piedmont is considered a myth. The lab - and Amazon rainforest team - use an inhibitor created by Vedala that prevents unwanted contamination from AS. Kline, due to motor neurone disease, has a cybernetic implant that allows her to remotely control the ISS and drones inside the sterile module.

The group's travel towards the anomaly is met with disaster when local tribesmen attack during the night, killing all the guides. Brink is also killed, but it becomes apparent he has been killed by exposure to a new Andromeda strain variant - dubbed AS-3 - and not only has his blood powdered, but his body is being assimilated into the contaminated tree he is leaning against. Peng discovers his body and recovers a vial of nerve toxin, which she secretes before the others arrive. The sole survivor of the tribe is a young boy called Tupa, who bonds with Stone after he uses his drone tech to translate between their two languages. The tribesmen have destroyed the uplink to Stern, but they contact Kline on the ISS, where under the impression Brink is still alive, she gives a coded message instructing him to use the toxin and kill the team.

Tupa leads them to the anomaly which is found to be partially man-made, and partially constructed from extruded AS-3 - an accident in a hydro-electric plant caused AS-3 to surge out of control and consume all local matter - the jungle, animals and remaining construction workers - before becoming semi-dormant again. Kline remotely activates machinery at the anomaly killing Odhiambo and Peng, but before dying Peng reveals to the survivors that AS is present throughout the solar system and examples have been discovered on all visited planets and moons so far, supporting the theory that AS is artificial and has been sent to seek out and inhibit life.

Meanwhile, on the ISS, Stern has attempted to remove Kline from the team, but she cuts communications to Earth and traps her two companion astronauts in a return module. She then releases a reverse-engineered AS-3 from the ISS which begins to form a nano-filament reaching down to Earth and the anomaly which is creating a spire up towards the ISS. Unknown to Kline, the corrupted new strain has also begun consuming the ISS itself, only the inhibitor slows the process.

The survivors - Vedala, Stone and Tupa - come to several conclusions: Kline has created a space elevator, which if successful would revolutionise space flight, but also that she has underestimated AS-3, and far from being stable it will consume the planet and all resources on it. Stone and Vedala ride the space elevator up to the ISS to confront Kline and sever the link before the corrupted strain can travel down the filament to Earth.

Kline uses ISS machinery to fight back - but with help from the two imprisoned astronauts Stone and Vedala enter the contaminated ISS and find Kline partially consumed by the corrupt AS-3. Stone kills her using Brink's nerve toxin, but the corrupt AS-3 is still a threat. He travels back down the space elevator to a midsection point and detonates an explosive charge severing the link ahead of the corrupt AS-3 which is by now heading towards Earth as well. Vedala and the two astronauts release the return module while Stone uses a high altitude emergency parachute to return to Earth.

In an epilogue, Stone and Vedala have married and adopted Tupa. The corrupt and consumed ISS has crashed into Saturn where AS-3 has created a structure on the planet's surface and although the purpose is unknown, Stern comments that "...it is sending out radio signals, but not to us."

== Main characters ==
- General R. Stern: A four-star US general in command of NORAD (Colorado), leader of the Amazon mission.
- Dr. James Stone: Robotics and artificial intelligence expert. The son of Dr. Jeremy Stone, and also a Piedmont, Arizona AS-1 survivor.
- Dr. Nidhi Vedala: A nanotechnology expert who developed a spray to prevent infection by Andromeda particles.
- Dr. Sophie Kline: An ISS astronaut and expert in robotics and nanotechnology, who has ALS.
- Peng Wu: A soldier, doctor, pathologist and former taikonaut who has an anxiety/panic disorder.
- Harold Odhiambo: A scientist well-studied in anthropology, biology, and geology.
- Tupa: A 10-year-old boy, the sole survivor of an Amazon tribe wiped out by AS-3.

== Development ==
Development of the book began when Crichton's widow, Sherri, chose to approach a writer to pen a sequel to The Andromeda Strain. She cited her reason as "I don't want Michael's classic body of work to be forgotten". Writer Daniel H. Wilson was approached to write the sequel and Sherri retained final approval of the book before publication. Wilson conducted research with NASA at the Johnson Space Center and explored a mockup space station and spoke with Robonaut 2 scientists. He has stated that he wanted to both acknowledge the original book and also take into account the advances made in science and space exploration since the 1970s.

== Reception ==
The Washington Post noted that "Predictable as this group is, their adventure is at least as exciting as Crichton’s original story — and considerably more active. The jungle provides an ominous setting for some spooky scenes. And the episodes set in outer space are particularly thrilling." USA Today also reviewed the book, writing "In the end, The Andromeda Evolution explodes with an unexpected, gripping, cinematic finale, ready-made. Crichton and techno-thriller fans will be entertained, if not awed."
