= Daniel H. Wilson =

American novelist (born 1978)

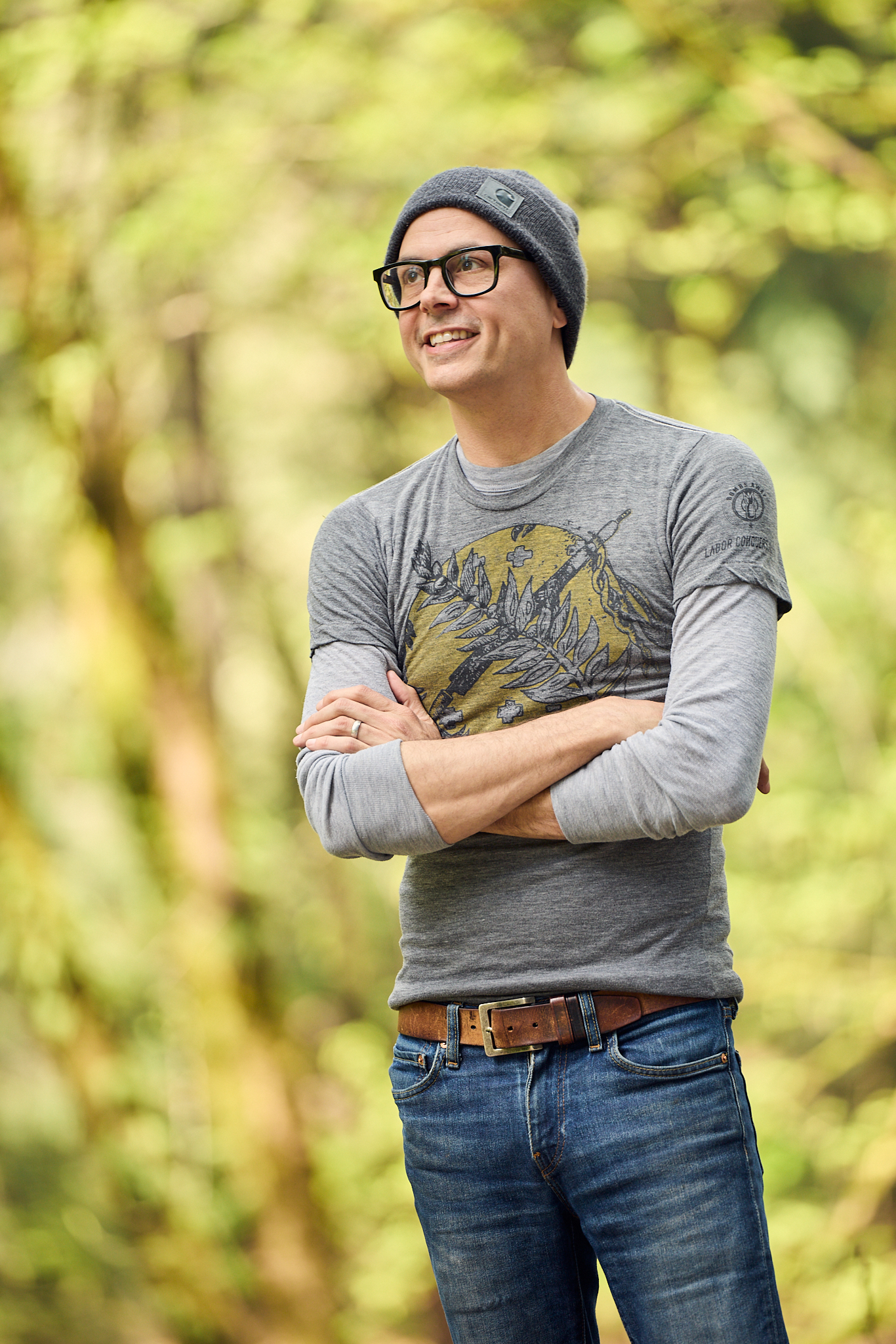
- Wilson in 2025
- Born: March 6, 1978 (age 48); Tulsa, Oklahoma, US
- Education: Carnegie Mellon University University of Tulsa
- Occupation: Writer
- Writing career
- Period: 2005–present
- Notable works: How to Survive a Robot Uprising, Robopocalypse, The Andromeda Evolution
- Website: www.danielhwilson.com

Daniel H. Wilson (born March 6, 1978) is a Cherokee citizen and novelist. Several of his books have been on the New York Times bestsellers list. of techno-thrillers such as Robopocalypse, The Andromeda Evolution, and How to Survive a Robot Uprising. Formerly, he worked as a television host and robotics engineer.

== Early life, family and education ==
Daniel H. Wilson was born in Tulsa, Oklahoma, the elder of two children. He is a citizen of the Cherokee Nation.

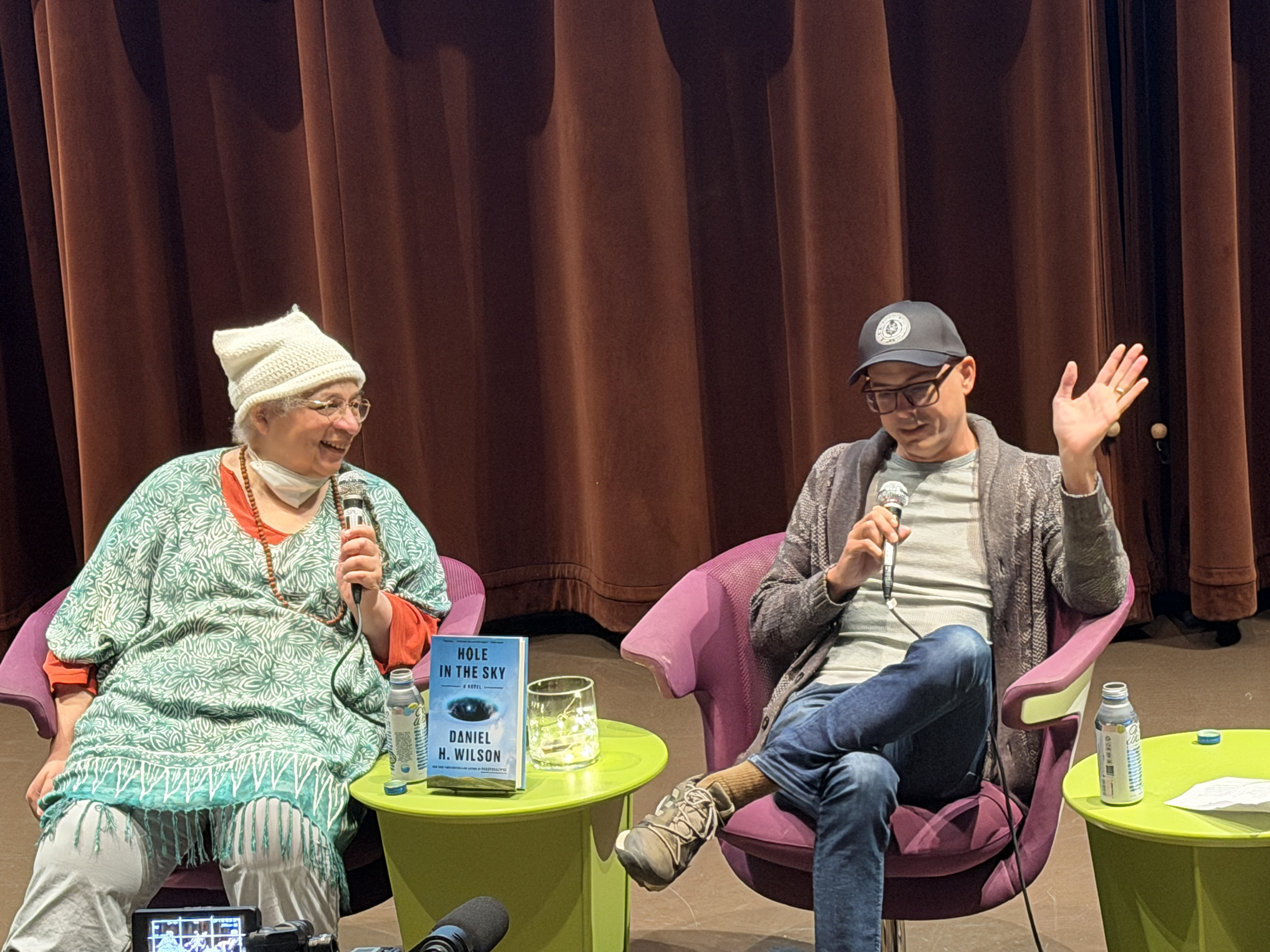
Daniel H. Wilson in conversation with Nisi Shawl at the Seattle Library on Oct. 16, 2025.

Wilson attended Booker T. Washington High School, graduating in 1996. He earned his B.S. in Computer Science at the University of Tulsa in 2000, spending one semester studying philosophy abroad in Melbourne, Australia at the University of Melbourne. He completed an M.S. in Robotics, another M.S. in Machine Learning, and his PhD in Robotics in 2005 at the Robotics Institute at Carnegie Mellon University in Pittsburgh, Pennsylvania. His thesis, Assistive Intelligent Environments for Automatic Health Monitoring, focused on providing automatic location and activity monitoring in the home via low-cost sensors such as motion detectors and contact switches. He has worked as a research intern at Microsoft Research, the Xerox PARC, Northrop Grumman, and Intel Research Seattle.

== Bibliography ==
=== Novels ===
- A Boy and His Bot, middle reader (New York: Bloomsbury Children's, 2011)
- Robopocalypse, techno thriller (New York: Doubleday, 2011)
  Daniel H. Wilson on Bookbits radio talking about Robopocalypse.
- Amped, techno thriller (New York: Doubleday, 2012)
- Robogenesis, techno thriller (New York: Doubleday, 2014)
- The Clockwork Dynasty, techno thriller (New York: Doubleday, 2017)
- The Andromeda Evolution, techno thriller (New York: Harper, 2019)
  - (Authorized sequel to Michael Crichton's novel The Andromeda Strain)
- Hole in the Sky, science fiction/horror (New York: Doubleday, 2025)

=== Non-fiction ===
- How to Survive a Robot Uprising: Tips on Defending Yourself Against the Coming Rebellion, humor (New York: Bloomsbury, 2005)
- Where's My Jetpack?: A Guide to the Amazing Science Fiction Future That Never Arrived, humor (New York: Bloomsbury, 2007)
- How to Build a Robot Army: Tips on Defending Planet Earth Against Alien Invaders, Ninjas, and Zombies, humor (New York: Bloomsbury, 2008)
- The Mad Scientist Hall of Fame: Muwahahaha!, humor (New York: Citadel, 2008)
- Bro-Jitsu: The Martial Art of Sibling Smackdown, humor (New York: Bloomsbury Children's, 2010)

=== Short fiction ===
Collections

- Guardian Angels and Other Monsters, short story collection (New York: Vintage, 2018)

Anthologies edited

- Robot Uprisings, co-edited with John Joseph Adams (New York: Vintage, 2014)
- Press Start to Play, co-edited with John Joseph Adams (New York: Vintage, 2015)

Stories

- "The Nostalgist" (Tor.com, 2009)
- "Parasite" (in 21st Century Dead: A Zombie Anthology, edited by Christopher Golden, St. Martin's Press, 2012)
- "Helmet" (in Armored, edited by John Joseph Adams, Baen Books, 2012)
- "Freshee's Frogurt" (in Diverse Energies, edited by Tobias S. Buckell and Joe Monti, Tu Books, 2012)
- "Foul Weather" (in "Nightmare Magazine", edited by John Joseph Adams, 2012)
- "The Executor" (in The Mad Scientist's Guide to World Domination, edited by John Joseph Adams, Tor, 2013)
- "Small Things" (in Robot Uprisings, Knopf Doubleday, 2014)
- "Kismet" (in Help Fund My Robot Army, 2014)
- "The Blue Afternoon that Lasted Forever" (in Carbide Tipped Pens, edited by Ben Bova, Tor, 2014)
- "God Mode" (Lightspeed Magazine, 2015)
- "Bastion" (in Resist: Tales from a Future Worth Fighting Against, Broad Reach Publishing, 2018)
- "Miss Gloria" (in Guardian Angels & Other Monsters, Vintage, 2018)
- "Blood Memory" (in Guardian Angels & Other Monsters, Vintage, 2018)
- "Special Automatic" (in Guardian Angels & Other Monsters, Vintage, 2018)
- "One for Sorrow: A Clockwork Dynasty Story" (in Guardian Angels & Other Monsters, Vintage, 2018)
- "Jack, the Determined" (in Guardian Angels & Other Monsters, Vintage, 2018)
- "All Kinds of Proof" (in Guardian Angels & Other Monsters, Vintage, 2018)
- "A History of Barbed Wire" (in A People's Future of the United States, One World, 2019)
- "Iterations: Seat 13F" (in DUST: Multiverse, 2020)
- "Crystalline" (in Lightspeed Magazine, 2023)
- "Ocasta" (in New Suns 2: Original Speculative Fiction by People of Color, edited by Nisi Shawl, Solaris, 2023)
- "SuperMAX" (in Uncanny Magazine Issue 53, 2023)
- "WhaleSong" (in Uncanny Magazine Issue 65, 2025)

=== Comic books ===
- "Earth 2: World's End" (26 issue weekly series, with Marguerite Bennett and Mike Johnson, DC Comics, 2014)
- "Earth 2: Futures End" (one-shot, art by Eddy Barrows, DC Comics, 2014)
- "Earth 2: Society" (7 issue monthly series, art by Jorge Jimenez, DC Comics, 2015)
- "Spring" (in "Zombies vs Robots Annual Y0", illustrated by Sam Kieth and edited by Chris Ryall, IDW, May 2012)

=== Graphic novels ===
- "Quarantine Zone", illustrated by Fernando Pasarin (DC Comics, 2016)

=== Apps ===
- "Mayday! Deep Space", developed with Mountain Machine Studios and voiced by Osric Chau, Bitsie Tulloch, and Claire Coffee (January 7, 2015)

=== Critical studies and reviews of Wilson's work ===
Press Start to play

- Sakers, Don (October 2015). "The Reference Library". Analog Science Fiction and Fact. 135 (10): 105–108.

== Film adaptations ==
=== How to Survive a Robot Uprising ===
How to Survive A Robot Uprising, published during Wilson's final year of graduate school in late 2005, was optioned by Paramount Pictures. A screenplay was written by Tom Lennon and Ben Garant, and produced by Michael De Luca. Mike Myers was attached to star. The book's sequel How to Build a Robot Army was also optioned by Paramount Pictures. However, the options eventually expired.

In October 2010, the book was re-optioned by writer-director Steve Pink with Jack Black in mind to star.

=== Bro-Jitsu ===
In May 2007 (before publication), Bro-Jitsu was optioned by Nickelodeon Movies (a subset of Paramount Pictures) and Wilson hired to write the screenplay.

=== Robopocalypse ===
In November 2009, Wilson sold his novel Robopocalypse to Doubleday, with Jason Kaufman (editor of Dan Brown, among others) coming on as editor. One day before rights to the novel were purchased, Wilson sold film rights to DreamWorks SKG, with Steven Spielberg officially signing on to direct. On March 7, 2018, Michael Bay replaced Spielberg as director over Spielberg's scheduling conflicts.

=== Amped ===
In November 2010, Wilson sold his novel Amped to Doubleday, working again with editor Jason Kaufman. Film rights to the novel were sold to Summit Entertainment, with Alex Proyas (Dark City, The Crow, I, Robot) attached to direct.

=== The Nostalgist ===
In 2014, Wilson's short story was adapted into the short film The Nostalgist written and directed by Giacomo Cimini. The short film premièred June 19, 2014, at the Palm Springs International Shortfest.

=== Alpha screenplay ===
In 2014, it was announced that Lionsgate Studios acquired the distributing rights to Wilson's screenplay for the sci-fi film Alpha. Anthony Scott Burns is attached to direct, and Brad Pitt is reportedly involved in production as well. A decade later, its status is unclear.

=== Hole in the Sky ===
Hole in the Sky was released in October 2025. Before the novel's debut, it was already optioned by Netflix via Aggregate Films for a feature film.

== Television host ==
Wilson hosted The Works, a TV series on the History Channel. It debuted on July 10, 2008. Ten episodes of The Works aired, in which Wilson explained the hidden workings of common items, including sneakers, guns, beer, garbage, robots, skydiving, power tools, steel, motorcycles, and tattoos. Wilson has also appeared as himself in Modern Marvels and Countdown to Doomsday.

== Personal life ==
Wilson resides in Portland, Oregon.
