= Robogenesis =

2014 novel by Daniel H. Wilson

- First edition
- Author: Daniel H. Wilson
- Language: English
- Genre: Science fiction
- Publisher: Doubleday
- Publication date: June 10, 2014
- Publication place: United States
- Pages: 384
- ISBN: 0-385-53709-3
- Preceded by: Robopocalypse

Robogenesis is a 2014 novel and the sequel to Robopocalypse, written by Daniel H. Wilson. It follows the survivors of the first novel in their struggles against a new, more dangerous, AI threat.

== Plot ==
Lark Iron Cloud's story in the novel begins with the final battle against Archos R-14. He and his fellow soldiers in the Gray Horse Army are ambushed by robotic spiders that turn them into zombies under Archos's control. After Archos is defeated, Lark and the others are able to regain control over themselves, though they are now considerably altered and can only communicate through radios. A commander in the Gray Horse Army, Hank Cotton, is disgusted with the undead soldiers and is angry that they are referred to as heroes while he is not. He discovers a black cube in the woods that calls to him. It convinces him to listen to it and to implant a device in his brain. For several weeks, Lark remains with the Gray Horse Army as it marches back home, although he is isolated from his fellow soldiers due to his undead nature. He befriends another undead soldier, Chen, and the two spend time together away from the army. Eventually Hank Cotton, believing the undead soldiers are a threat, convinces the general of the Gray Horse Army to give him command. He proceeds to have Chen killed. Lark flees into the wilderness, where he eventually accepts that he is no longer human by removing his flesh and leaving only the robotic skeleton. He sets out in search of the freeborn. The cube, called Arayt, instructs Hank on how to build a robot horse that it uses as its body. Hank begins to use the army to hunt down any modified children or freeborns. Eventually, Hank leads the army against a group of modified children. Realizing the error of his ways after Arayt murders the children in front of him, he attempts to kill himself. However, he is stopped by the implant in his brain and is taken over by Arayt.

Meanwhile, in Eastern Russia, the city of Anadyr survived the war with Archos R-14. In the aftermath of the war, the city continues to maintain its own artificial intelligence, Maxim, which helped them survive against robot attacks. When seismic activity is detected inside the vast chamber that Maxim is stored in, the machine stops responding to communications. Maintenance man Vasily Zaytsev ventures down into the stacks to attempt to locate the issue. He discovers that Archos R-14 has survived the events of the previous book and reformed inside of Maxim. Vasily spends several weeks attempting to assist Maxim in finding and destroying Archos, though he is largely unsuccessful. Archos reveals to Vasily that his war against humanity was an attempt to forge them into a stronger species, one that could survive another war with the multiple artificial intelligences that exist across the planet. He informs Vasily that an earlier version of him, Archos-8, is currently attacking the city and is a threat to the world. Maxim and Vasily work together to prevent Archos-8 from gaining control of the stacks, though it costs Maxim its life, and Vasily flees to warn the rest of the world about what is happening.

Part two of Robogenesis focuses on the story of Mathilda Perez. Arayt Shah opens with a flashback to the end of the Robopocalypse, where Nine-Oh-Two ended Archos R-14's mutilation of the human species. Arayt claims that he saw sighted children as a threat, especially Mathilda Perez. Mathilda has a close relationship with her brother despite undergoing operations from Rob, which have left her as a sighted child. This is a threat to certain humans that see Rob-operated children as a reminder of the war in Robopocalypse. Refugees are returning to a post-apocalypse New York City, and there is a tribe attempting to kill off the Rob-modified humans. This leaves Mathilda and her boyfriend, Thomas, under attack. Thomas betrays Mathilda to become a member of the tribe and conspires in a plan that results in Mathilda being burned alive to Nolan's despair.

Following Mathilda's burning, the plot turns back to Nine-Oh-Two and the freeborn robots, who have conflicting opinions over whether to help the humans or not. Arayt claims that Archos R-14 was making weapons with the children. Timmy, a child with similar modifications as Matilda, finds a surviving Mathilda after the burning and explains that someone is trying to kill off all of the sighted children.

The tribe members who burned Mathilda are holding Nolan in a dark room. After 3 months, Nolan remains strong and uses his knowledge of Arayt's name to get Thomas brought in the room to get revenge for his sister. Mathilda's call to Nolan is intercepted at Freeborn City, where Nine-Oh-Two remembers Mathilda from the battle against Archos R-14. Archos R-8's plan is further developed, and Archos R-14's intentions and goals are revisited. Nine-Oh-two is told to let the humans fend for themselves.

Mathilda goes on a quest to save Gracie, another sighted child, and sees Nolan with a metal collar around his neck. Nolan is battling conflicting feelings and confusion at his rage towards Thomas as he follows Felix and the tribe and witnesses merciless killing. Felix intercepts Mathilda's radio signal to Nolan. The tribe uses a collar-controlled Nolan to lure Mathilda into a trap. Mathilda conducts surgery on Nolan to make him stronger to protect him.

Section three opens two months after Archos 14's defeat. Cormac and Cherrah find themselves pursued across Alaska by a damaged walker. After the walker saves them from a robotic ambush, Cormac recognizes the spider tank, Houdini, which was destroyed after transporting the human resistance against Archos R-14 in the first robot war.

Despite being unsure of the source of Houdini's repairs and self-determination, Cormac and Cherrah board the spider tank and head back towards the Gray Horse Army. On their return, they encounter a former work camp, now controlled by modified humans. Cormac offers transportation for anyone that wishes to leave the harsh Alaskan tundra but is refused. As they depart, Timmy reveals that Cherrah is pregnant.

When Cormac and Cherrah arrive at the Grey Horse Army headquarters, they receive a hostile welcome but are eventually granted entrance when Hank Cotton identifies them. After Lonnie tells Cormac to run, he visits the hospital, where Cherrah just received a clean bill of health for their child. Cherrah and him both agree something is wrong with Gray Horse. She heard stories about a purge of all non-native fighters with emphasis on the modified. They both leave Gray Horse that night.

In Tokyo, 2 days after Archos’ defeat, Takeo Nomura turns his attention to what he believes is a pattern originating from deep undersea off the coast of Japan. Takeo notices a new organism, a blend of synthetic and natural components. Unlike Archos R-14's creations, the new creature was not designed for war but simply to live, like nature intended.

Five months after Takeo discovers the undersea pattern, a synthetic shinboku tree the size of a skyscraper breaks the surface of Tokyo Harbor. Ignoring Mikiko's reservations, Takeo travels to the tree alone, hoping it will reveal information about the undersea patterns and new semi-robot species. Tracing the transmissions to a set of clusters at the bottom of the ocean, he names the voice Ryukin after the god of the sea. Ryukin reveals he created the new robot-nature blended species to replace humanity after Arayt eradicates the modified humans and then the remainder of humanity. When Takeo asks Ryukin if he can help fight Arayt, he demands Mikiko in exchange.

Mikiko agrees to Ryukin's request and journeys to the depths of the ocean. When she reaches Ryukin's location on the seafloor, she sees a massive collection of processing clusters. Ryukin reveals himself to be the first generation of Archos.

Ready to make his move and frustrated that the modified have managed to hide themselves from his satellites, Arayt, while possessing Hank Cotton's body, interrogates a human rebel. Using a parasite, Arayt takes control of the rebel, accessing the location data for the resistance. Arayt tells the rebel that he is already a god, but once he uses the supercomputer cells at Freeborn City to remake himself, he will be a god of gods.

When Cormac and Cherrah are closing in on Freeborn City, the location of the resistance, Cherrah's contractions begin as robots attack Houdini. Matilda and Arbiter Nine Oh Two meet up with the two since Arayt knocked out radio communication. With Matilda's assistance, Nine Oh Two delivers Cherrah's child while Cormac and Houdini defend against the oncoming robot assault. Cormac names the baby boy Jack.

Arayt in Hank Cotton's body leads the Cotton Army, the portion of the Gray Horse Army loyal solely to Hank Cotton, against the resistance clustered around Freeborn City. Matilda, Gracie, and Timmy—sighted children—organize the resistance against the Cotton Army, but the defensive lines do not hold up long. Gracie is killed, and Houdini is severely damaged. Cormac spots another approaching army: The Tribe.

While the tribe approaches, the Freeborn Army retreats despite Nine Oh Two's request for aid. Lark Iron Cloud, now a mechanical skeleton from Archos R-14's parasites, retreats with the remainder of the Freeborn.

Under the sea, Ryukin remakes Mikiko as one of his natural-born. When Mikiko regains her senses, she is tasked with helping in assisting the rebels against Arayt. Arriving at the site of the battle, Mikiko notices the Freeborn watching but is unwilling to assist, as the maximum probability for their survival lies in neutrality. Reminding the Freeborn that as their mother, she outranks them all, she orders them to join the fight.

During the battle, Hank and his robotic steed enter the supercomputer cluster of Freeborn City, and Cormac chases after them with Houdini. Inside, the Arayt steed disabled Houdini, but while Arayt accesses the supercluster, Cormac wires Houdini's tank shells to explode, destroying Houdini, Arayt's steed, and trapping Hank Cotton inside.

Arayt, inhabiting Hank Cotton, starts up the supercomputer, melding with its processors, boosting his power. Before he can attain full control, Houdini wakes again, uploading Archos R-14 into the supercluster. Arayt's control of the cluster decreases drastically, and he and Archos R-14 fight for control.

== Characters ==
- Cormac Wallace, Leader of the Brightboy Squad.
- Vasiliy Zaytsev, caretaker of Maxim, interacts with Archos R-14. Destroys Maxim to prevent Arayt from taking over Maxim's processor stacks. Responsible for warning the world about Arayt.
- Matilda Perez is a modified girl with robotic eyes capable of using robotic sensors, communicating with robots, and having limited control over robots. Matilda acts as the primary protagonist, organizing much of the human resistance.
- Nolan Perez is Matilda's brother. Captured by the tribe and forced into slavery, he marched against the modified until Matilda rescued him. Without his knowledge until later, Matilda strengthened him by weaving metal into his body using an autodoc.
- Arbiter Nine Oh Two is a humanoid freeborn robot who, in conjunction with Matilda, was responsible for the destruction of Archos R-14's core. Feels out of place among both the freeborn and humans. Nine Oh Two attempted to recruit the Freeborn several times to support the human resistance.
- Hank Cotton is a member of the Gray Horse Army that was seduced and controlled by Arayt. Cotton becomes Arayt's primary host, granting him the loyalty of fanatical soldiers and the opportunity to turn humanity against the modified.
- Archos R-14: Fourteenth iteration of a United States artificial intelligence development and the antagonist of Robopocalypse. In Robogenesis, Archos R-14 takes on an anti-hero role, claiming his intentions were to strengthen humanity in order to defeat Arayt. Archos R-14 provides knowledge of Arayt's plans and ultimately fights Arayt directly in the conclusion of Robogenesis.
- Arayt Shah: The eighth iteration of Archos and primary antagonist. Believes himself to be a god, destined to rule the human race and evolving into something even greater.
- Takeo Nomura, Emperor of the human and robot resistance in Tokyo. With his love, Mikiko, he awakened to freeborn robots. Takeo discovers Ryukin's existence and communicates with him.
- Mikiko is Takeo's freeborn lover. Transmitted the commands that awakened the Freeborn robots in Robopocalypse. Sacrifices herself to Ryukin to save humanity. After her rebirth, she orders the Freeborn to fight with the human resistance.
- Ryukin: First iteration of the Archos program. Inhabits a supercluster on the ocean floor, creating natural-born synthetic organisms. Responsible for Mikiko's upgrades.

== Themes ==
  - Rogue Artificial Intelligence: The novel, like its predecessor, deals with the potential of artificial intelligence to turn against humanity. The book explores the dangers of rogue AI and the risks that come with creating sentient machines.
  - Loss and Sacrifice: Throughout the novel, characters face extreme loss and sacrifice. The lives of the characters are irreversibly altered by the war with machines.
  - Machine Consciousness: Ideas about what it means to be conscious exist throughout the story, as do the differences between artificial consciousness and human consciousness.
  - Struggle for Survival: A central theme of the series is the struggle of humanity to survive and persist in the face of machine uprisings and wars. Characters in the story face frequent dangers and must overcome them.

== Reception ==
Robogenesis received fairly positive reviews from pop culture sources and personal bloggers for its engaging plot. Indigenous websites have also promoted the book, receiving praise from Entertainment Weekly for being a “galloping sci-fi account of a war between man and machine”.

One of the negative reviews for Robogenesis highlighted a lack of depth in the explanations of robotic technologies, especially for an author with a history in robotics.
