= Tommy Manning =

American mountain and distance runner (born 1976)

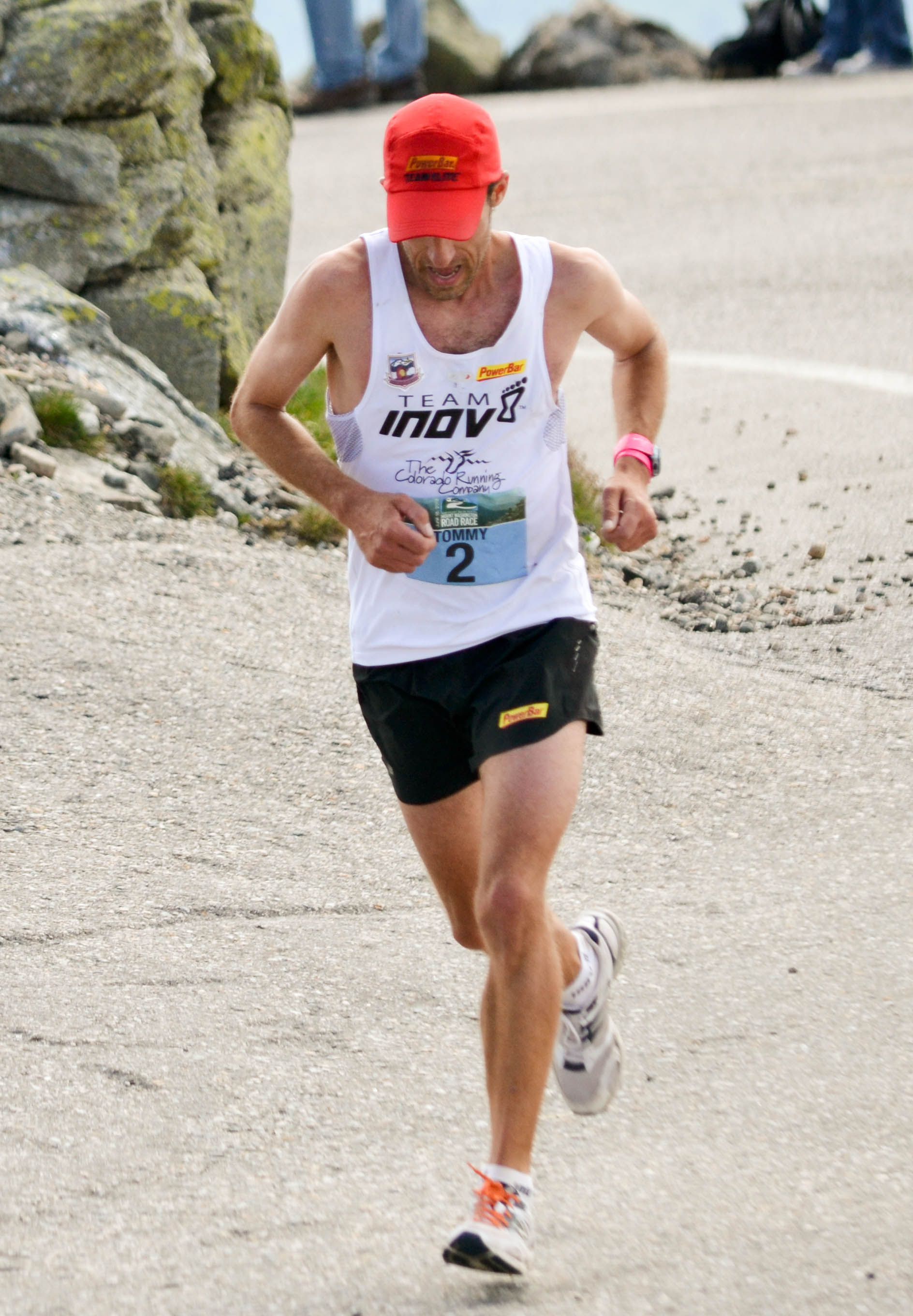

Personal information
- Full name: Tommy Manning
- Nationality: American

Tommy Manning (born 1976) is an American mountain and distance runner.

Manning was a member of the 2010 United States Mountain Running Team that placed second at the World Mountain Running Championships in Kamnik, Slovenia. Manning finished 18th overall out of 149 runners. Manning won the 2004 Tulsa Run in Tulsa, Oklahoma, finished second at the 2009 Pikes Peak Ascent, and finished 34th overall at the 2009 Boston Marathon.

Manning was a mountain running uphill specialist and won two Masters World Mountain Running Championships. His first World Championship was won in 2013 in Janske Lazne, Czech Republic. His second World Championship was won in 2018 in Zelezniki, Slovenia.

Born in Tulsa, Manning attended Booker T. Washington High School. Prior to graduating, Manning was involved in a serious motorcycle accident and suffered a career threatening injury. Manning also ran cross country at the University of the South where he won a Cross Country Championship.

Manning won two races in Switzerland in 2019. He won the 12 km Valser Herbstlauf in Vals. The 12 km race started in Vals, Switzerland and had a vertical distance of 730m to the finish line. Manning finished in 1:03:53; second place Manuel Insenmann (age 24) finished in 1:06:49. Manning also won the Generoso Trail race up Monte Generoso located on the border between Switzerland and Italy and between Lake Lugano and Lake Como. The Generoso Trail race is a 10.1 km uphill race with 1348m elevation change race that started at 353m in Mendrisio, Switzerland and finished on top of Monte Generoso. Manning finished in 59:09.

Manning was inducted into Booker T. Washington’s 2022 Ring of Honor class during a ceremony between the Hornets’ basketball games against Bixby on Friday night, Feb 4, 2022 at Nathan E. Harris Fieldhouse.

Manning lived in Colorado and taught at Fountain Valley boarding school up until 2017, when he moved to Switzerland and began teaching at TASIS, The American School in Switzerland. He taught math for 4 years before leaving TASIS.
