= Where's My Jetpack? =

2007 book by Daniel H. Wilson

Where's My Jetpack?: A Guide to the Amazing Science Fiction Future that Never Arrived
- Author: Daniel H. Wilson
- Cover artist: Richard Horne
- Language: English
- Subject: future studies, social satire
- Publisher: Bloomsbury
- Publication date: April 17, 2007
- Publication place: United States
- Media type: Print (Paperback) and AudioBook (audio cassette, MP3 CD, and audio-CD)
- Pages: 192 pp
- ISBN: 1-59691-136-0

Where's My Jetpack: A Guide to the Amazing Science Fiction Future that Never Arrived is a semi-satirical non-fiction book by Daniel Wilson published in April 2007 by Bloomsbury Publishing.
