= The Nostalgist =

- Theatrical, VOD and home video release poster
- The Nostalgist
- Directed by: Giacomo Cimini
- Screenplay by: Giacomo Cimini
- Based on: The Nostalgist by Daniel H. Wilson
- Produced by: Giacomo Cimini; Tommaso Colognese; Pietro Greppi
- Starring: Lambert Wilson; Samuel Joslin
- Cinematography: Gareth Munden
- Edited by: Eleanor Infante
- Music by: Lorenzo Piggici
- Production company: Wonder Room Productions
- Release date: 19 June 2014 (Palm Springs International Shortfest)
- Running time: 17.44 minutes
- Country: United Kingdom
- Language: English

The Nostalgist is a 2014 science fiction short film, written and directed by Giacomo Cimini, based on the short story The Nostalgist by Daniel H. Wilson. It was produced by Giacomo Cimini, Tommaso Colognese and Pietro Greppi for Wonder Room Productions. It stars Lambert Wilson as the father and Samuel Joslin as the son. The short film was filmed in London and explores the themes of loss, nostalgia and robotics. It is noted for its performances and visual effects.

The short film was partially financed through a Kickstarter campaign.

The short film premièred Jun 19, 2014 at the Palm Springs International Festival of Short Films and went on to participate in the Fantastic Fest 2014, the Clermont-Ferrand International Short Film Festival 2015 and the Cleveland Film Festival 2014. It later had a limited release in the United States and Russia. It also premièred as video on demand on the We Are Colony on-line platform in October 2014.

The short film was included in the short film programme Cult of the BFI London Film Festival 2014. In 2014 it won the Méliès d’Argent, the Audience Awards at Trieste Science+Fiction Festival and Utopiales, as well as Best Short Film at the Giffoni Film Festival 2014.

The short film was selected for the Short Takes section of the December 2014 issue of the American Cinematographer.

== Synopsis ==
A father and a son live in a world of Victorian splendour but reality turns ugly when the father's virtual reality system begins to malfunction.

== Awards ==
- 2nd place Best Short Film over 15 minutes - Palm Springs International Festival of Short Films 2014.
- Best Short Film (Generator +18) - Giffoni Film Festival 2014.
- Prix du Publique - Utopiales, Festival International de Science Fiction 2014.
- Méliès d’Argent and Audience Award - Trieste Science + Fiction Festival.
- Best Sci-Fi Short film - 28th Leeds International Film Festival.
- Best Professional Short Film over 10 minutes - Raw Science Film Festival.
