= The Andromeda Strain =

1969 techno-thriller novel by Michael Crichton

- First edition cover
- Author: Michael Crichton
- Language: English
- Genre: Techno-thriller, science fiction
- Publisher: Knopf
- Publication date: May 12, 1969
- Publication place: United States
- Media type: Print (hardcover and paperback)
- Pages: 350
- ISBN: 0-394-41525-6
- OCLC: 12231
- Followed by: The Terminal Man

The Andromeda Strain is a 1969 novel by American writer Michael Crichton, his first novel under his own name and his sixth novel overall. It documents the outbreak of a deadly extraterrestrial microorganism in Arizona and the team of scientists investigating it. The book is presented as a report from a secret government project involving scientists, and features text-based computer imagery that illustrates the results of various tests on the organism. The Andromeda Strain appeared in The New York Times Best Seller list, establishing Michael Crichton as a genre writer, and is an early example of the techno-thriller genre.

== Plot ==
A team from an Air Force base is deployed to recover a military satellite that has returned to Earth, but contact is lost abruptly. Aerial surveillance reveals that everyone in Piedmont, Arizona, the town closest to where the satellite landed, is dead. The duty officer of the base tasked with retrieving the satellite suspects it returned with an extraterrestrial contaminant and recommends activating "Wildfire", a protocol for a government-sponsored team of scientists intended to contain threats of this nature.

The Wildfire team, led by Dr. Jeremy Stone, believes that the satellite—intentionally designed to capture upper-atmosphere microorganisms for bio-weapon exploitation—returned with a deadly microorganism that kills through nearly instantaneous blood clotting. Upon investigating Piedmont, the team discovers the townspeople either died in mid-stride or went "quietly nuts" and committed bizarre suicides. Two survivors—the sick, Sterno-addicted, geriatric Peter Jackson and the constantly bawling infant Jamie Ritter—are biological opposites who somehow survived the organism.

Jackson, Ritter, and the satellite are taken to the secret underground Wildfire laboratory, a secure facility equipped with every known capacity for protection against microorganisms escaping into the environment. Wildfire is hidden in a remote area near Flatrock, Nevada, sixty miles (100 km) from Las Vegas, concealed beneath a legitimate Department of Agriculture research station. Dr. Mark Hall is the only scientist authorized to disarm the automatic self-destruct mechanism; he is an unmarried, childless male and thus presumed to make the most dispassionate decisions during a crisis.

Further investigation determines that the deaths were caused by an extraterrestrial microbe transported by a meteor that crashed into the satellite, knocking it from orbit. The microbe contains chemical elements required for terrestrial life (CHNOPS) and appears to have a crystalline structure, but lacks the DNA, RNA, proteins, and amino acids present in terrestrial life, and directly transforms energy to matter with no discernible byproducts. The microbe, code-named "Andromeda", mutates with each growth cycle, changing its biological properties.

The scientists learn that the current form of Andromeda grows only in a narrow pH range; in a too-acidic or too-alkaline growth medium, the organism will not divide. Andromeda's ideal pH range is 7.39–7.43, within the range found in normal human blood. Jackson and Ritter survived because both had abnormal blood pH (Jackson acidotic from consumption of Sterno and aspirin, Ritter alkalotic from hyperventilation). However, by the time the scientists realize this, Andromeda has mutated into a form that degrades the laboratory's plastic seals and escapes containment. One of the scientists, Dr. Charles Burton, is exposed to the escaped organism but survives because the mutated Andromeda is no longer pathogenic.

The mutated Andromeda attacks the plastic door and hatch seals within the Wildfire facility, rapidly migrating toward the upper levels and the surface. The self-destruct nuclear weapon is automatically armed when it detects the containment breach, triggering its detonation countdown to prevent the spread of the infection. As the bomb arms, the scientists realize that given Andromeda's ability to generate matter directly from energy, the organism would be able to consume the released energy and ultimately benefit from a nuclear explosion, mutating in thousands of ways, potentially "each killing in a different way".

To halt the detonation, Hall must insert a special key he carries into an emergency substation, one of which should be accessible from any location in Wildfire. Unfortunately, he is trapped in a section that, due to an oversight, has no substation. He must navigate Wildfire's obstacle course of automatic defenses to reach a working substation on an upper level. He disarms the bomb only seconds before the air is evacuated from the deepest level of the Wildfire complex, which contains the remainder of the team and their assistants. Andromeda is suspected to have eventually mutated into a benign, anaerobic form and migrated to the upper atmosphere, where the oxygen content is lower, better suiting its growth.

The novel's epilogue reveals that a crewed spacecraft, Andros V, was incinerated during atmospheric re-entry, presumably because Andromeda had eaten its tungsten/plastic laminate heat shield and caused it to burn up.

== Main characters ==
- Dr. Jeremy Stone — Professor and chair of the bacteriology department at Stanford University; Stone is fictitiously the winner of the 1961 Nobel Prize in Physiology or Medicine, whereas the actual winner was Georg von Békésy
- Dr. Charles Burton — Professor of Pathology at the Baylor College of Medicine
- Dr. Peter Leavitt — Clinical microbiologist; has epilepsy
- Dr. Mark Hall — Surgeon
- Prof. Christian Kirke — one of the intended five, an anthropologist from Yale, was hospitalized with appendicitis

== Background ==
Crichton was inspired to write the novel after reading The IPCRESS File by Len Deighton while studying in the UK. Crichton says he was "terrifically impressed" by the book—"a lot of Andromeda is traceable to Ipcress in terms of trying to create an imaginary world using recogniseable techniques and real people." He wrote the novel over three years.

== Odd-man hypothesis ==
The "odd-man hypothesis" is a hypothesis that states that unmarried men are better able to execute the best, most dispassionate decisions in crises—in this case, to disarm the nuclear weapon intended to prevent the escape of organisms from the laboratory in the event the auto-destruct sequence is initiated. In the novel, the odd-man explanation is a page in a Hudson Institute report of the results of test series wherein different people were to make command decisions in nuclear and biological wars and chemical crises.

Hall is briefed on the hypothesis after his arrival at Wildfire. In the book, his copy of the briefing materials has the hypothesis pages removed; in the film, he is criticized for failure to read the material beforehand.

Dr. Hall is assumed to have the highest "command decision effectiveness index" among the Wildfire team; this is the reason why he is given a control key to the self-destruct mechanism. Hall initially derides this idea, saying that he has no intention of committing suicide before he is told that it is his job to disarm the weapon, rather than to arm it: Stone then admits that the odd-man hypothesis, while accurate (in the confines of the book), was essentially a false document used to justify handing over a nuclear weapon to private individuals and out of government control.

== Adaptations ==
In 1971, The Andromeda Strain was the basis for the film of the same name directed by Robert Wise, and featuring Arthur Hill as Stone, James Olson as Hall, Kate Reid as Leavitt (changed to a female character, Ruth Leavitt), and David Wayne as Dutton (Burton in the novel).

In 2008, The Andromeda Strain was the basis for an eponymous miniseries executive-produced by Ridley and Tony Scott and Frank Darabont, and featuring Benjamin Bratt as Stone. Other characters' names and personalities were radically changed from the novel.

== Reception ==
Reviews for The Andromeda Strain were overwhelmingly positive, and the novel was an American bestseller, establishing Michael Crichton as a respected novelist and science-fiction writer. The Andromeda Strain is one of the books credited with creating the techno-thriller genre.

The Pittsburgh Press said it was "relentlessly suspenseful... A hair-raising experience." The Detroit Free Press called it "Hideously plausible suspense... will glue you to your chair." Library Journal said The Andromeda Strain was "One of the most important novels of the year".

Writing for The New York Times, Christopher Lehmann-Haupt said, "Tired out by a long day in the country, I was awake way past bedtime. My arms were numb from propping up my head. By turning from side to side, I had driven the cats from their place at the foot of the bed, and they were disgruntled. I was very likely disturbing my wife's sleep. But I was well into Michael Crichton's The Andromeda Strain. And he had me convinced it was all really happening."

== Sequel ==
A sequel titled The Andromeda Evolution written by Daniel H. Wilson was published on November 12, 2019. Crichton's name still appears on the cover in large print, despite the book being written after his death.
