= Graham Robertson (filmmaker) =

American filmmaker and author (born 1973)

- Born: July 16, 1973 (age 52); Denver, Colorado, U.S.
- Occupations: Filmmaker, author
- Awards: Golden Asteroide for Grand Prize; 2004 Able Edwards; SciencePlusFiction Film Festival

Graham Robertson (born July 16, 1973) is an American filmmaker and author. A native of Denver, Colorado, Robertson studied film at the College of Santa Fe in Santa Fe, New Mexico. Shortly thereafter, he found his way into the motion picture industry via set decoration and the art department working on numerous television series and feature films.

In 2000, Robertson, along with co-creator Philip Stark unleashed a viral internet spoof, Superfriends Wassup!, a parody of the Budweiser "Whassup?" commercial featuring clips from Hanna-Barbera's Super Friends.

In 2019, Robertson wrote, produced and directed the short film, Burbank starring Rockmond Dunbar. It's the tale of a man living in Burbank, California with a busted time machine in his garage.

Robertson has also written and directed the ultra low-budget feature film, Able Edwards. Executive produced by Steven Soderbergh and categorized by Guinness World Records as the first all green screen feature film. Able Edwards is the story about the clone of a Walt Disney/Howard Hughes type created to restore vitality to a once glorious corporation.

Based on the experiences of directing Able Edwards, Robertson went on to write the book, Desktop Cinema: Feature Filmmaking on the Home Computer, a step-by-step account into how one would make their own feature film on Apple's Macintosh computer.
