= Dimitri Scarlato =

Italian composer and conductor

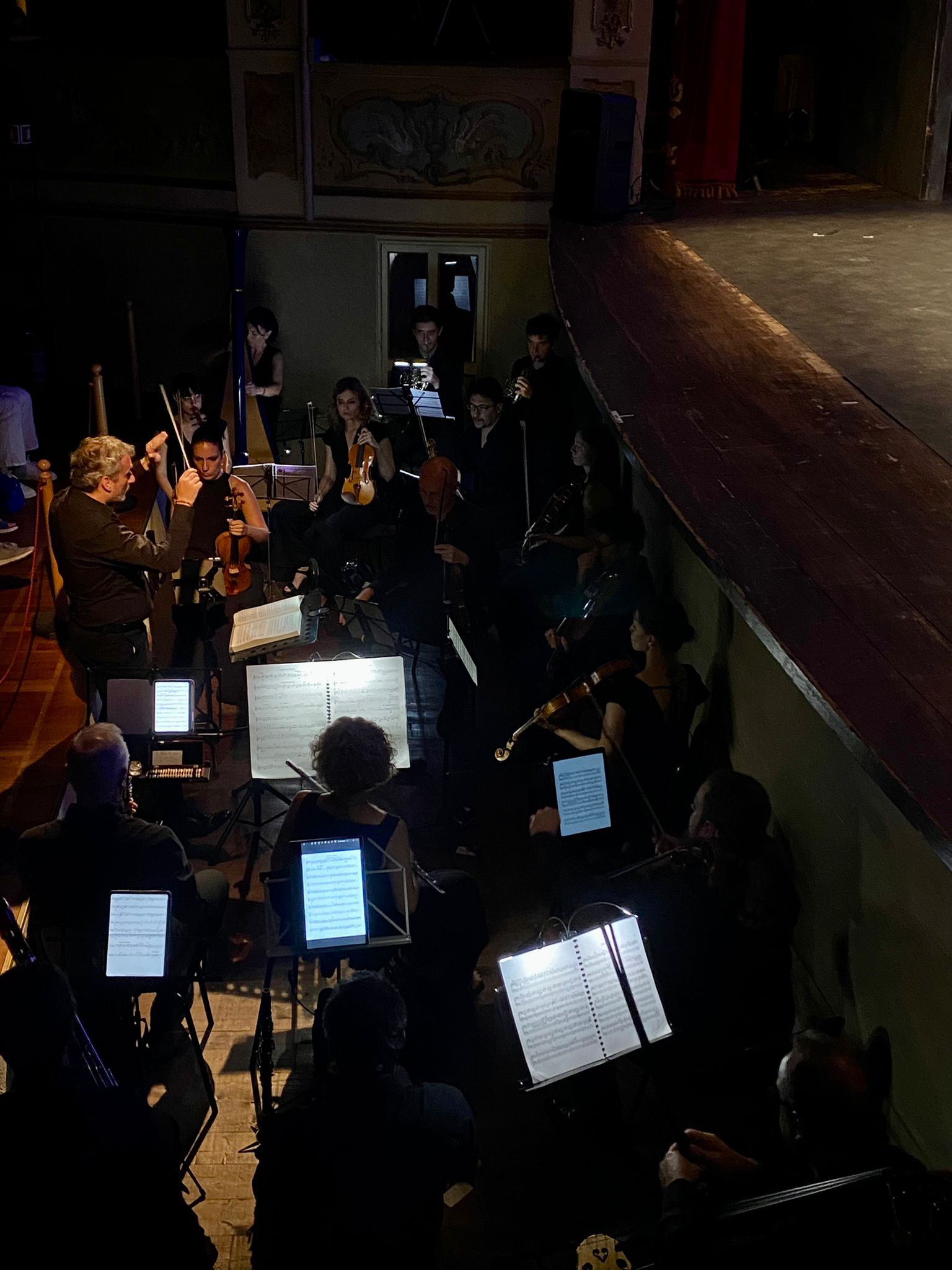
- Dimitri Scarlato conducting La bohème, Teatro Asioli, Correggio, 29 July 2024

Background information
- Born: Dimitri Scarlato; April 21, 1977 (age 48); Rome, Italy
- Occupations: Composer and Conductor

Dimitri Scarlato (born 21 April 1977) is an Italian composer and conductor, based in London.

== Early life and education ==
He received his degree in Composition, Conducting and Score Reading in 2004 at the Conservatorio Santa Cecilia in Rome while studying privately Jazz Piano and Classical Piano. After his studies in Rome, he studied conducting with Milen Nachev and Alexander Polyanichko in Saint Petersburg.

In 2004, he moved to London in order to pursue a Master’s in Composition at the Guildhall School of Music & Drama.

In 2014, he was awarded a Doctorate in Composition at the Royal College of Music, which in 2010 selected him as an RCM Rising Star.

== Film and theatre scoring ==
In 2003, he composed the music for the musical Piaf…l’Hymne à l’Amour, directed by Carlo Lizzani. The musical was performed at several prestigious Italian theatres, including the Teatro Regio in Parma and the Teatro Argentina in Rome.

In 2007, he worked on the music pre-production for the film Sweeney Todd: The Demon Barber of Fleet Street directed by Tim Burton.

While completing his Master’s in London, he began to collaborate with young directors from the London Film School and composed the music for several projects, including the short film The City in the Sky by Giacomo Cimini, which in 2009 was selected for the 66th Venice Film Festival. In 2009, he also composed and conducted the soundtrack for Per Sofia, a feature film by Ilaria Paganelli.

In 2015, he was the music/conducting coach of Sir Michael Caine in Youth (2015 film), a film by the Oscar-winning director Paolo Sorrentino. In 2015, he also composed the music score for Revelstoke. A Kiss in the Wind, a documentary directed by Nicola Moruzzi, which was selected for the final shortlist at the 2016 edition of the David di Donatello Awards.

In 2019, he composed the music score for Il talento del calabrone, the first feature film directed in Italian by Giacomo Cimini, with Sergio Castellitto and Anna Foglietta, released in 2020 and distributed by Amazon Prime Italy.

In 2022, he composed the music for Miss Agata, a short film co-directed by Anna Elena Pepe and Sebastian Maulucci, and produced by Ladybug Crossmedia (Italy) and Tabit Films (UK). Miss Agata explores themes of gender violence, PTSD, immigration and inclusion. In the score, Scarlato incorporates Afrobeats elements to his own music style, drawing inspiration from the cultural background of the film's male protagonist, Nabil. The score features the track Don't Give Up on Me performed by Rosemary Annabella Nkrumah.

In 2023, Scarlato composed the score for Folle d’amore - Alda Merini, the biopic of the famous Italian poet, directed by Roberto Faenza and produced by RAI. Scarlato commented: “Faenza gave me a lot of space, the music is at times intense and deep, I am very satisfied”.

In 2024, he worked on the soundtrack of documentary Pompei - The New Dig, directed by Elena Mortelliti, and produced by Lion Television for BBC2 and iPlayer.

Currently, he is the Area Leader in Composition for Screen at the Royal College of Music in London.

== Contemporary classical music and operas ==
His music has been performed at various venues, including the Barbican Centre and Cadogan Hall in London, the Teatro Olimpico in Rome and the Teatro La Fenice in Venice. His two operas, Fadwa (2013) and La tregua di Natale, have been produced and staged by Accademia Filarmonica Romana and Nuova Consonanza.

In 2018, he composed In Limbo, which drew inspiration from the book In Limbo: Brexit testimonies from EU citizens in the UK by Italian activist Elena Remigi. Remigi commented: "Our limbo is not only about having the right documents or not. There is a psychological limbo too, in which we all feel we have plunged. My hope is that we can all return to behold the stars, content and settled as we were before this referendum". The composition was commissioned by the International Spring Orchestra Festival in Malta and received its first performance for the closing concert of the 12th International Spring Orchestra Festival at the Teatru Manoel, La Valletta in April 2018.

In 2018, he conducted the closing concert at the International Spring Orchestra Festival in Malta with a programme featuring Bartok, Lutoslawski, and two world premieres. He also conducted the 2022 closing concert at the same festival with a programme that included Xenakis, Gubaidulina, Mahler and two world premieres.

In 2024, Scarlato composed a Missa Brevis commissioned by the Chapter of the Orvieto Cathedral, Stefano Benini, director of the Cathedral Choir “Vox et Jubilum”, and Riccardo Bonci, the Cathedral organist. The Missa brevis was premiered during Mass on Pentecost Sunday.

== Awards and honours ==
In 2011, he was selected as a film composer at the Berlinale Talent Campus, and was selected to join the VOX 3 – Composing for Voice workshop at the Royal Opera House in London.

In 2015, he won the 3rd Composition Competition at the International Spring Orchestra Festival in Malta.

In 2020, he was awarded the second prize at the Opera Harmony Digital Festival with his mini-opera A Life Reset.

In 2021, he received the Award for Best Original Music for the film Intolerance directed by Giuliano Giacomelli and Lorenzo Giovenga at the Inventa un Film Festival.

In 2023, his score for Miss Agata received the Award for Best Music Score at the Overcome Film Festival.

== Album releases ==
In 2019, he released the album Colours, in which each track is dedicated to a colour of the prism. The album is developed as a journey through nine colours and the last colour, white, can be considered a synthesis. Scarlato has stated: "I don’t see colours, I hear them", evoking a synaesthetic effect. The project started around 2009 with the recording of the demos of Blue, Brown and Yellow and was completed only a decade later; it draws inspiration from an eclectic range of composers, Yann Tiersen, Ryuichi Sakamoto and Max Richter among them. In the spirit of interdisciplinarity, Scarlato joined forces with poet Laura-Jane Foley, who composed poems for each colour for the live performances. The project was developed in close collaboration with Agnieszka Teodorowska (cello) and Yuriy Chubarenko (accordion). In 2017, Colours was performed for the first time in a concert. Scarlato explained: "In this project, each colour has a story of its own and is connected to a person or event in my life. The music is very 'visual,' and it can be linked to images or stories. Gray for example evokes the memory of my father, blue recalls the melancholy of a love story that has ended. It would be interesting to see if my portrayal of colours is the same as the listener's."
