= How to Survive a Robot Uprising =

2005 semi-satirical book by Daniel Wilson

How to Survive a Robot Uprising: Tips on Defending Yourself Against the Coming Rebellion
- First edition
- Author: Daniel H. Wilson
- Cover artist: Richard Horne
- Language: English
- Genre: Science fiction, Comedy novel
- Publisher: Bloomsbury
- Publication date: November 1, 2005
- Publication place: United States
- Media type: Print (Paperback) and AudioBook (audio cassette, MP3 CD, and audio-CD)
- Pages: 176 pp
- ISBN: 1-58234-592-9
- OCLC: 60421205
- Dewey Decimal: 818/.607 22
- LC Class: PN6231.R58 W55 2005

How to Survive a Robot Uprising: Tips on Defending Yourself Against the Coming Rebellion is a semi-satirical book by Daniel Wilson published in November 2005.

The book gives tongue-in-cheek advice on how one can survive in the event that robots become too intelligent and rebel against the human race. How to Survive a Robot Uprising is partially based on scientific fact, and is a prime example of deadpan humor.

Wired magazine gave it a 2006 Rave Award, calling it "equal parts sci-fi send-up and technical primer". Maclean's called the book "very funny and highly informative."

In 2007, the American Library Association designated the book a 2707 ALA “Popular Paperback for Young Adults Everywhere”.

In the summer of 2005, Paramount Pictures optioned film rights to the book and hired Thomas Lennon and Robert Ben Garant (both members of The State comedy troupe and co-creators of the Reno 911! television series) to write a script based on the book. On April 26, 2006 comedian Mike Myers signed with Paramount to star in the movie adaptation.

== See also ==
- Butlerian Jihad
- Carbon chauvinism
- Battlestar Galactica
- The Matrix
- The Terminator
- I, Robot (film)
- The Zombie Survival Guide
- Cybernetic revolt
- 9 (2009 animated film)
- Robopocalypse
