= Hole in the Sky (novel) =

2025 novel by Daniel H. Wilson

- First US edition cover
- Author: Daniel H. Wilson
- Language: English
- Genre: Science fiction; Horror
- Publisher: Doubleday
- Publication date: October 7, 2025
- Publication place: United States
- Media type: Hardback
- Pages: 288
- ISBN: 978-0-385-55111-3

Hole in the Sky is a 2025 science fiction and horror novel by Cherokee writer Daniel H. Wilson. It was first published in the United States in October 2025 by Doubleday. The novel is about an alien first contact that takes place on a Cherokee reservation in Oklahoma.

Hole in the Sky received the 2026 Alex Award "for [one of] the 10 best adult books that appeal to teen audiences".

== Background ==
Wilson said in an interview with Space.com that Hole in the Sky explores two things close to his heart: science fiction and robots, and where he is from. He explained that he is Cherokee, and grew up on a reservation close to Spiro Mounds in eastern Oklahoma, one of the many mysterious burial mounds across America created by the ancient Mound Builders. Wilson wanted the novel to be about a native's perspective on alien first contact, and how he deals with the unknown. Wilson said it was "fun to tell that story and get to subvert that genre and put my own spin on first contact".

Wilson stated that one of the inspirations he had for Hole in the Sky was an article he read on the search for extraterrestrial intelligence in the American Indian Culture and Research Journal. He said it is assumed that "extraterrestrial intelligences" are technologically advanced. "We’re not looking for civilizations that might be in harmony with their planet. We’re not looking for interstellar Native Americans".

Wilson said other inspirations for the novel included Carl Sagan's 1985 novel, Contact, Denis Villeneuve's 2016 film, Arrival, and the 1979 Soviet film, Stalker. Wilson said he was "excited" about plans to make an "Arrival-level" film of Hole in the Sky. He found that writing the screenplay and being involved in the film's production "really fun because film is so visual and you're thinking about how to make it super visual".

== Plot summary ==
Hole in the Sky is narrated by four characters: Mikayla Johnson, a NASA scientist monitoring data sent from the Voyager 1 and 2 probes; Gavin Clark, a military scientist investigating Unidentified Anomalous Phenomena; Jim Hardgray, a Cherokee national living close to the sacred Native American Spiro Mounds in eastern Oklahoma; and "The Man Downstairs" (MD), an unnamed graduate student confined to a basement by the US military to analyse a mysterious "Pattern" from space he stumbled onto.

The Voyager probes, now beyond the heliopause, have detected a large object entering the Solar System. Johnson calculates that it is heading for Earth, and that the point of impact will be Oklahoma. She also discovers that Nix, her augmented reality glasses, have begun to give her puzzling instructions. MD identifies the source of the Pattern as being from the incoming unidentified object, and Nix tells Johnson that she has been chosen by an alien entity on Earth that the incoming object has awoken. MD and Johnson both determine that the object is heading for the Spiro Mounds. Hardgray witnesses a government ordered evacuation of the impact site, but experiences strange visions of his long-dead ancestors and creatures from Cherokee mythology. Clark, Johnson, and Hardgray converge on the Spiro Mounds – Clark to investigate the unidentified object; Hardgray to answer the call of his ancestors; and Johnson to meet the alien entity.

== Critical reception ==
In a review of Hole in the Sky in Locus magazine, Alexandra Pierce called the book "a classic alien-contact thriller", and "an enjoyable entry into this venerable genre". She praised the character development, and stated that "this is a novel about humanity: the people who approach the strange with fascination and curiosity, and those who approach it with fear."

American writer Charlie Jane Anders wrote that Hole in the Sky begins as a "well-executed thriller" with a rapid developing story line. But as the plot unfolds, she stated that "Wilson slowly ratchets up the weirdness" and introduces elements of horror and dread. Anders concluded that the novel's climax connecting Native American culture to the mound "proves more powerful than conventional science".

Liz Braswell stated in The Wall Street Journal that Hole in the Sky is a mix of science fiction and "the murky realm of cosmic horror and elder gods" that should appeal to a broad spectrum of readers. She complimented Wilson on his "masterly job of combining Native American experience and ancestral connection with modern warfare for a satisfying resolution."

A starred review of Hole in the Sky in Publishers Weekly stated that Wilson "neatly entangles" indigenous American culture and modern technology to create "a stunning phantasmagoric first contact tale". The reviewer said that "Like the best X-Files episodes, this story uses the alien character to bring out the human elements in vivid detail". A reviewer in Kirkus Reviews was a little more critical of the novel, and called it "a prescription bottle’s worth of nightmarish images, invasive biotechnology, and Indigenous cosmology". They opined that it is "[l]ess [of a] spectacle than a robot uprising, (Note: This refers to Wilson's Robopocalyps series of novels) but deeper, weirder, and harder to shake off". The reviewer added that as the story builds to a climax, it "gets more and more unhinged (and occasionally unclear)".

== Adaptation ==
In April 2025, Hole in the Sky was optioned for a feature film by Jason Bateman’s Aggregate Films and Netflix, six months before the novel was published. Wilson will write the screenplay, and serve as the film's executive producer, and it is slated to be directed by Sterlin Harjo, a Native American director, producer and screenwriter from Oklahoma.

Wilson and his agent had approached several production companies about making a film, and Netflix and Aggregate Films expressed the most interest. They were shown drafts of the novel, and discussions ensued resulting in adjustments being made to parts of the story.
