= Giacomo Cimini =

Italian film director (born 1977)

- Born: February 8, 1977 (age 49); Rome, Italy
- Education: London Film School
- Occupations: Director, Screenwriter, Producer, Lecturer
- Website: www.giacomocimini.com

Giacomo Cimini (born February 8, 1977) is a London-based Italian film director, screenwriter, and producer.

He graduated with an MA in filmmaking at the London Film School writing, directing and producing the short film La Città nel Cielo (City in the Sky) that premiered at the 66th Venice Film Festival and achieve international distribution on iTunes.

He is represented in USA by talent agencies CAA and in UK by Casarotto Ramsay & Associates.

In 2012, he founded the production company Wonder Room Productions.

In 2014 he wrote, produced and directed the award-winning short film The Nostalgist based on a short story by Daniel H. Wilson.

In 2019 he directed his first feature film in Italian Il talento del calabrone, with Sergio Castellitto and Anna Foglietta, distributed by Amazon Prime Italy, with music by Italian London-based composer Dimitri Scarlato.
