= List of University of Tulsa people =

This is a list of notable alumni and notable current and former faculty of the University of Tulsa.

== Notable alumni ==
=== Arts, letters, media, social sciences and the humanities ===
- Rilla Askew – novelist and short story author
- Louis W. Ballard – composer and author
- Sara Berner – film, television and radio actress and distinguished voice artist
- Ted Berrigan (BA/MA) – poet associated with the New York School movement
- Ridge Bond – Broadway stage actor (famous for playing Curly in the musical Oklahoma!)
- Gibson Byrd – painter and longtime faculty member at University of Wisconsin–Madison
- Greyson Chance – singer and songwriter
- Becky Dixon – television broadcaster
- Gail Farrell (BA, 1969) – singer and songwriter
- Jim Hartz (attended 1958–1960) – former co-host of The Today Show
- Paul Harvey (attended 1930s) – syndicated radio personality and author
- Lance Henson (MA) – Cheyenne poet
- S. E. Hinton (BS, 1970) – author of Rumble Fish and The Outsiders
- Ruthe Blalock Jones (BFA, 1972) – American Indian painter and print-maker
- Jerry Keller – pop singer and songwriter best known for 1959 hit "Here Comes Summer"
- R.A. Lafferty (attended 1933–35) – science fiction and fantasy writer
- Dennis Letts – stage actor and English professor
- Bob Losure (BA, Broadcast Journalism, 1969) – former CNN Headline News anchor and author
- Anurag Mathur – best-selling author of The Inscrutable Americans
- Rue McClanahan (German and Theater Arts, 1956) – Emmy Award-winning actress, known for her performance as Blanche Devereaux on The Golden Girls
- Phillip McGraw, aka Dr. Phil (attended 1968–1969) – TV personality and psychologist
- Peter McRobbie – Scottish-born American actor
- Ralph Mullins- jazz trumpet player and film composer
- Mary Kay Place (BA, Speech, 1969) – actress and singer
- John Elwood Price – composer, pianist, ethnomusicologist, and music teacher
- Carter Revard (B.A. 1952) – poet and linguist
- Donald Roulet (BA, Theology) – Presbyterian minister and civil rights activist
- Gailard Sartain (BFA, 1969) – film and television actor and illustrator
- Darren Sherkat – sociologist
- Joseph Shore – operatic baritone
- Patrick Suppes (attended) – philosopher and longtime professor at Stanford University
- Vu Tran – writer; teaches at University of Chicago
- Julie Ann Ward – Poet Laureate of Norman, Oklahoma, University of Oklahoma professor
- Jeanne Tripplehorn (attended) – film and television actress
- K. D. Wentworth – science fiction author
- W. Richard West Sr. – painter and sculptor
- Wade Williams (BA, Theatrical Studies, 1987) – actor starring in television series Prison Break
- Daniel H. Wilson – roboticist and author of How to Survive a Robot Uprising, Where's My Jetpack? and How to Build a Robot Army and the bestseller Robopocalypse
- Grace Steele Woodward – writer and historian
- Antonio Zarro – actor, screenwriter, and filmmaker

=== Business and industry ===
- Charles Finkel – beer and wine entrepreneur and innovator
- Michael Kitces – financial commentator
- Doug McMillon (M.B.A. 1991) – CEO of Walmart
- Adrian L. Miller – music executive and record producer
- Ermirio Pereira de Moraes (BS, Petroleum Engineering) – Brazilian billionaire

=== Law, politics, and public affairs ===
- Suhail Al Mazroui – energy minister for the United Arab Emirates
- Tareq Al-Suwaidan (PhD, Petroleum Engineering, 1990) – Muslim scholar; reformer; TV personality; management expert
- Howard Barnett Jr. – president of Oklahoma State University-Tulsa
- Bradley M. Berkson (BS, Petroleum Engineering, 1985) – US Department of Defense director of Cost Assessment and Program Evaluation; assistant secretary of Defense for Logistics and Materiel Readiness; recipient of Department of Defense Medal for Distinguished Public Service
- Jim R. Caldwell – first Republican member of the Arkansas State Senate in the 20th century, 1969–1978; retired Church of Christ minister in Tulsa; studied in doctoral program at University of Tulsa
- Craig Campbell (BA, Political Science, 1974) – Lieutenant Governor of Alaska
- Samuel H. Cassidy (Law, 1975) – former Lieutenant Governor of Colorado
- John E. Dowdell (Law, 1981) – United States district judge on the United States District Court for the Northern District of Oklahoma
- Kevin Easley – oil and gas executive, member of Oklahoma House of Representatives and Oklahoma Senate
- Drew Edmondson (JD, 1978) – Oklahoma attorney general and candidate for governor
- Lex Frieden – scholar, disability rights activist, deemed "chief architect of the Americans with Disabilities Act"
- Gregory Kent Frizzell (BA, History, 1981) – United States district judge on the United States District Court for the Northern District of Oklahoma
- Ross C. Goodman (JD, 1995) – noted Las Vegas criminal defense attorney
- David Hall (JD 1959) – former governor of Oklahoma
- Kendra Horn (BA, 1998) – US congresswoman for Oklahoma's 5th congressional district
- Hani Abdulaziz Al Hussein (B.S. 1971) – CEO of the Kuwait Petroleum Corporation; oil minister of Kuwait
- Jim Inhofe (BS, Economics, 1973) – US senator (R-Oklahoma), former mayor of Tulsa
- Bill LaFortune (JD, 1983) – former mayor of Tulsa
- Steve Largent (BS, Biology, 1975) – former US congressman (R-Tulsa) and Pro Football Hall of Famer
- Robert E. Lavender (JD, 1953) – Oklahoma Supreme Court justice
- Colonel Michael Mulligan (J.D. 1988) – US Army attorney famous for serving as lead prosecutor in the courts-martial of Hasan Akbar and of Nidal Malik Hasan, the sole accused in the November 2009 Fort Hood shooting
- Monroe Nichols (B.A., 2005) – mayor of Tulsa, Oklahoma; wide receiver for the Tulsa Golden Hurricane
- Elizabeth Crewson Paris (BA, 1980; JD, 1987) – United States Tax Court judge
- Roger Randle (J.D., 1979) – former mayor of Tulsa and president pro tempore of the Oklahoma Senate
- Myles W. Scoggins – president, Colorado School of Mines; former energy executive
- Rodney W. Sippel (BS, 1978) – federal judge for the United States District Court for the Eastern District of Missouri
- Chad "Corntassel" Smith (JD, 1980) – principal chief of the Cherokee Nation
- Steve Young – former mayor of Kennewick, Washington

=== Science, technology, engineering, and medicine ===
- W. Frank Blair (B.S. 1934) – zoologist
- Richard M. Eakin (attended) – pioneering zoologist and Guggenheim Fellow
- Kenneth R. Hall – chemical engineer
- Gordon Matthews (BS, Engineering Physics, 1959) – pioneer of voicemail technology
- Laura Sullivan-Beckers – biologist
- Marie Tharp – geologist and oceanographic cartographer; first to systematically study and first to create a global bathymetric map of the oceans
- Godfried Toussaint (B.S. 1968) – Canadian computer scientist and mathematician (professor at McGill University and New York University Abu Dhabi)
- Harry Volkman – meteorologist, first to issue a tornado warning
- Michael Wehmeyer (B.S., 1980, M.A. 1982) – educational psychologist and pioneer of application of positive psychology to studies of disability
- Abdul Aziz bin Laboun – Saudi Arabian geologist

=== Academic leaders ===
- Howard Barnett Jr. – president of Oklahoma State University–Tulsa
- Daniel J. Bradley – president of Indiana State University
- Angelique EagleWoman – dean of Bora Laskin Faculty of Law and scholar of Native American law
- Allison Garrett – president at Emporia State University
- Stacy Leeds – dean of the University of Arkansas School of Law; scholar of Native American law; Supreme Court justice for Cherokee Nation
- Dale A. Lunsford (B.A. 1982, M.B.A. 1985) – president of LeTourneau University
- Myles W. Scoggins – president, Colorado School of Mines; former energy executive
- Patrick Suppes (attended) – philosopher and longtime professor at Stanford University
- Leigh H. Taylor – former dean of Southwestern Law School and dean of Claude W. Pettit College of Law at Ohio Northern University

Scholars, authors and researchers may be listed for accomplishments in other categories.

=== Sports ===
- Mike Anderson (1982) – former men's basketball player; former head coach of UAB, Missouri, Arkansas, and St. John's
- Bruce Arnold (1996) United States Virgin Islands archer
- Bob Babich – captain of the 1982 team; defensive coordinator, Chicago Bears
- Kathy Baker – professional golfer, NCAA champion and U.S. Women's Open champion
- Tom Baldwin – professional football player, New York Jets
- Don Bandy – professional football player, Washington Redskins
- Dick Blanchard – former professional football player
- Steve Bracey (1950–2006) – NBA basketball player
- Bob Breitenstein (born 1943) – former offensive lineman and first Argentine to play in the NFL
- André Bossert – Swiss professional golfer
- Dennis Byrd – professional football player, New York Jets
- Chris Chamberlain – linebacker, St. Louis Rams
- Danny Colbert – NFL player
- Joe Cooper – professional basketball player
- Steve Cox – former professional wrestler
- Ken Duncan – former professional football player
- Junior Etou (born 1994) – Congolese basketball player for Hapoel Be'er Sheva of the Israeli Basketball Premier League
- Jim Finks – pro football Hall of Famer
- Todd Franz – 2005 NFL player Green Bay Packers
- Gus Frerotte (1994) – professional football player
- Dean Hamel – former defensive lineman Washington Redskins and Dallas Cowboys
- Hank Haney (BS, education, 1977) – professional golf coach
- Steve Harris (BS, sociology 2001) – the university's second all-time leading scorer; former professional basketball player, Houston Rockets; #19 in the first round of the 1985 NBA draft
- Todd Hays (BA, Education, 1992) – Olympic silver medalist in bobsled
- Sarah Haskins (2003) – triathlete, won gold in 2011 Pan American games, competed in triathlon in the 2008 Beijing Olympics
- Mark Holata – former Captain Cane outside linebacker; professional mixed martial artist
- Damaris Johnson – professional football player
- Jerome Jordan – professional basketball player
- Brian Kelly – professional boxing; fought for the WBC World Light Heavyweight
- G. J. Kinne – professional football quarterback, New York Giants
- Carin Koch – professional golfer on the LPGA Tour
- Steve Largent (1975) – Seattle Seahawks receiver, Pro Football Hall of Famer; former US congressman
- Clyde LeForce – Detroit Lions quarterback
- Kevin Lilly – NFL defensive lineman
- Tony Liscio – former offensive lineman for the Dallas Cowboys
- Nancy Lopez (attended 1974–1977) – professional golfer
- Tim Martin – football player (Miami Dolphins)
- Jake McGuire – professional soccer player for Örebro SK
- Garrett Mills (2006) – tight end/fullback for the Minnesota Vikings
- Barry Minter – former Chicago Bears linebacker
- Ricky Ortiz – professional wrestler
- Jerry Ostroski – former Buffalo Bills offensive lineman
- Drew Pearson (BS, Recreation Administration, 1973) – former wide receiver, Dallas Cowboys; sportscaster; member of the Dallas Cowboys Ring of Honor
- Chris Penn – former San Diego Chargers wide receiver
- Stacy Prammanasudh (BS, Exercise & Sports Science, 2002) – professional golfer on the LPGA Tour
- Paul Pressey – former Milwaukee Bucks player; unofficially the first NBA point forward
- Dave Rader (BS Mechanical Engineering, 1975–1980) – former college and professional football player; head football coach of the University of Tulsa (1988–1999); former offensive coordinator and quarterbacks coach at the University of Alabama
- Ray Rhodes – former NFL head coach
- Jerry Rhome – former NFL quarterback
- Steve Rogers – former Montreal Expos starting pitcher
- Michael Ruffin – professional basketball player for Obradoiro CAB of the Liga Española de Baloncesto in Spain
- Bob St. Clair – former offensive lineman for the San Francisco 49ers and member of the Pro Football Hall of Fame
- Tracy Scroggins – former Detroit Lions linebacker
- Lovie Smith – head coach, Chicago Bears
- Paul Smith (BA, Communication, 2007) – quarterback, Jacksonville Jaguars
- Ray Smith – football player
- Bob Storey – former CFL player; two-time Grey Cup champion
- Willie Townes – former defensive lineman Dallas Cowboys
- Howard Twilley (1965) – former wide receiver, Miami Dolphins, 1966–76
- Bill Van Burkleo – former CFL player; four-time Grey Cup champion
- Kaye Vaughan – Hall of Fame football player, CFL
- Tyrunn Walker – defensive lineman Detroit Lions
- Howard Waugh – first player to rush for 1,000 yards in the CFL
- Charles Wright – gridiron football player

== Current and former faculty ==
- Larry Catá Backer – scholar of comparative law and international affairs
- Natan Brand – Israeli classical pianist
- Robert Butkin – law professor and former State Treasurer of Oklahoma
- Alfred Corn – poet and essayist
- William A. Darity Jr. – economist (now at Duke University)
- Dennis Denisoff – literary critic and poet
- Robert Donaldson – political scientist and former dean at Vanderbilt University
- Nancy Feldman – civil rights activist and civic leader
- Paul Finkelman – legal historian
- Germaine Greer – feminist theorist (one of the major voices of the second-wave feminist movement)
- Robert Hogan – psychologist known for his innovations in personality testing and organizational studies
- Alexandre Hogue – realist painter
- Tosca Kramer – noted violinist
- Moscelyne Larkin – one of the "Five Moons", Native American ballerinas from Oklahoma who gained international fame in the 20th century
- Pawel Lewicki – cognitive scientist and tech entrepreneur
- John S. Lowe – energy law scholar
- Joseph Wilson Morris – federal district judge for the Eastern District of Oklahoma
- Daniel Henry Mueggenborg – auxiliary bishop of Diocese of Seattle, former vice rector of the Pontifical North American College
- Marion Naifeh – author, cultural studies scholar and diplomat
- Darcy O'Brien – literary critic and author of fiction
- Paul A. Rahe – political theorist and commentator
- Albert C. Reynolds – petroleum engineering expert
- James Ronda – historian of the Western United States
- Robert Sanborn – urban educator
- Paul Scott – British novelist
- Boaz Sharon – pianist at Boston University Tanglewood Institute
- Melissa L. Tatum – scholar of Native American law
- Victor Udwin – comparative literature professor
- Keith Ward – philosopher and theologian at Oxford University
- Yevgeny Yevtushenko – Russian poet, dissident public intellectual and essayist
- Leonard Zusne – psychologist
