= James Wallace (basketball) =

American basketball coach

LeTourneau YellowJackets
- Title: Head coach

Personal information
- Born: November 24, 1989 (age 36) Bellevue, Nebraska
- Listed height: 5 ft 11 in (1.80 m)
- Position: Point guard
- Coaching career: 2011–present

Career history

Coaching
- 2014–2021: LeTourneau YellowJackets (assistant)
- 2021–Present: LeTourneau YellowJackets

Career highlights
- As Assistant Coach: ASC champion (2020)

James Wallace is an American basketball coach who is currently the head coach of LeTourneau YellowJackets of which was under the bracket NCAA Division III.

== College career ==
Wallace played for two different college or university in his tertiary level education. The first one, he played for Iowa Western Community College wherein he played until his sophomore season when he transferred to Southwest Minnesota State University in his junior season before an injury derailed his eventual playing career.

== Coaching career ==
As an assistant coach for LeTourneau YellowJackets, he won the 2019–20 ASC championship.

On April 27, 2021, he was promoted and subsequently accepted the head coaching job for the YellowJackets.

== Head coaching record ==
As of June 26, 2022

Team	Year	G	W	L	W–L%	Result
LeTourneau YellowJackets	2021–22	27	22	5	.8148	
Career		27	22	5	.8148	
