= Torretta (surname) =

Torretta is a surname. Notable people with the surname include:

- Gaspare Torretta (1883–1910), Italian athlete
- Gino Torretta (born 1970), American football player
- Margherita Torretta (born 1986), Italian concert pianist
- Pietro Torretta (c. 1912– 975), member of the Sicilian Mafia
