= Dana Reason =

Canadian musician

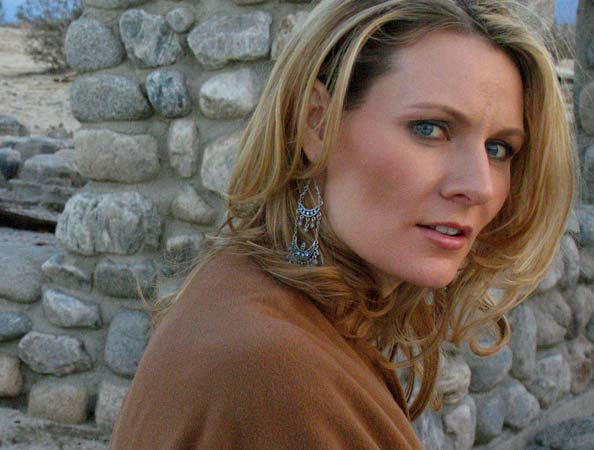
- Dana Reason

Background information
- Born: Canada
- Occupations: Musician, composer
- Instrument: Piano
- Years active: 1994–present
- Labels: Deep Listening, Hi-Bias, 482, Circumvention, Music and Arts, Red Toucan, Wide Hive, Mode
- Website: danareason.com

Dana Reason is a Canadian composer, recording artist, keyboardist, producer, arranger, and sound artist working at the intersections of contemporary musical genres and intermedia practices.

She appears on more than 17 commercially released recordings, including as a member of The Space Between trio with American electronic music pioneer Pauline Oliveros. She has also performed with Cecil Taylor, Roscoe Mitchell, George E. Lewis, Tim Berne, Fred Frith, Joelle Leandre, DJ Spooky, and Joe McPhee.

She has been featured on National Public Radio (USA), the Canadian Broadcasting Corporation and Radio Canada.

She currently lives in Oregon, United States, where she holds the position of Assistant Professor of Contemporary Music, School of Arts and Communication, at Oregon State University.

== Early life and career ==
Born in Canada, Reason began lessons on the piano at the age of three. Reason continued to compose throughout her primary school years, earning by age 15 an associate degree in performance from the Royal Conservatory of Music in Toronto.

Reason started her secondary studies at Barrie Central Collegiate Institute, where she played the trombone. But, after hearing her play the piano, she was encouraged by a substitute band teacher to apply at the Interlochen Arts Academy in Michigan. Reason auditioned and was awarded a scholarship that allowed her to finish secondary school at the academy. It was during this time that she became interested in contemporary music composition, jazz and free jazz.

After graduating from Interlochen at the age of 17, Reason met with pianist Boaz Sharon from the University of Florida. Sharon flew out to Toronto to audition her, and awarded Reason a scholarship to study classical piano at the university. During her time at the university, Reason sent an audition tape to the Juilliard School, and she was invited to start lessons that summer. Reason had wanted to attend Juilliard, but instead obtained a Bachelor of Music at McGill University.

== Mills College ==
After earning her degree at McGill, Reason attended Mills College in Oakland, CA to study composition. Her main teachers were Pauline Oliveros and Alvin Curran. Studying piano with Julie Steinberg, she also had classes with Christian Wolff, Cecil Taylor, Frederic Rzewski, and Glenn Spearman before completing her Master of Arts in composition.

== University of California, San Diego ==
Reason met George E. Lewis in the early 1990s at a festival in Tallahassee that featured his music. Lewis encouraged her to apply to the University of California, San Diego for a Ph.D. While at UCSD, Reason studied both classical and contemporary piano with Alex Karis, as well as improvisation with George E. Lewis, Anthony Davis and Muhal Richard Abrams. In the spring of 1999, Reason organized a two-day symposium on improvisation to complement this research, entitled "Improvising Across Borders." This event included more than a hundred participants, with 24 papers presented in concurrent sessions.

== Collaborations ==
Reason both performed with other musicians and composers during her time at UCSD, including Lisle Ellis, and Philip Gelb. From 1998 until 2003, Reason toured extensively as part of "The Space Between Trio" featuring Pauline Oliveros on the accordion and Philip Gelb on the shakuhachi.

After giving several solo performances, Reason met bassist Dominic Duval and drummer John Heward at Montreal's Suoni Per Il Popolo Festival in 2004, where they performed as a trio for the first time. Soon after, the trio recorded their first CD, "Revealed (Circumvention)," as the Dana Reason Trio, but the CD was not released at that time. In addition to her performances, she was commissioned by Rova Saxophone Quartet to write a composition entitled Transition in 2003, and to both improvise and interpret a 16-instrument score written by composer Sean Griffin for his project entitled "Snake River," which was presented in the Disney Concert Hall Complex in Los Angeles in the fall of 2006.

Reason is currently the Director of Popular Music at Oregon State University. She has taught there since 2008.

=== Discography ===
- Roscoe Mitchell’s Distant Radio Transmission: Nonaah Trio with John C Savage and Catherine Lee, (Wide Hive Records, 2020)
- John Heward Quintet: Improvisations, (Mode Records – Avant, 2019)
- Reasoning with Mark Dresser, Mike Gamble, Lori Goldston and Peter Valsamis, (Dana Reason, 2014)
- Angle of Vision with Glen Moore and Peter Valsamis, (482 Music, 2013)
- Revealed with Dominic Duval and John Heward, (Circumvention Music, 2010)
- Signs of the Times: Women/Men (including Dana Reason Trio), (Jazziz, 2010)
- Fjellestad/Kowald/Reason/Robinson: Dual Resonance, (Circumvention Music, 2003)
- The Space Between with Jöelle Léandre, (482 Music, 2003)
- The Space Between with Matthew Sperry, (482 Music, 2003)
- The Space Between with Barre Phillips, (482 Music, 2001)
- Hans Fjellestad: Red Sauce Baby (as guest pianist), (Accretions, 2000)
- The Space Between with Jon Raskin, (Sparkling Beatnik Records, 1999)
- Musicworks 74: Soundscape Minimalism (including The Space Between Trio), (Musicworks, 1999)
- Border Crossings, (Red Toucan 1997)
- Ellis: Children in Peril (as guest pianist), (Music And Arts, 1997)
- Primal Identity, (Deep Listening, 1996)
- Philip Gelb: Purple Wind (as guest pianist), (Ryokan, 1996)
- Da-Ro Re-Mix-Desire, (Da Grooves, 1994)
- Hard into the Night- Remix, (Numuzik Inc., 1994)
- Ya-Ya Re-Mix Mitsou, (Tox, 1994)
- Deep into Your Soul. Remix of Fan.cie, (Da Grooves, 1994)

=== Videography ===
- Off the Road: Documentary film by Laurence Petit-Jouvet, France 2001, featuring musical collaborations with German bassist Peter Kowald

=== List of Major Festivals and Performances ===
- Association des Musiciens Improvisateurs de Montreal
- Sound Symposium, Newfoundland
- Music Gallery, Toronto ON
- San Francisco Jazz Festival CA
- Knitting Factory, New York City NY
- Saide Bronfman Center, Montreal, ON
- Guelph Jazz Festival, Ontario
- Frau musica nova, Cologne, France
- Beyond the Pink Festival, Los Angeles
- Banff Arts Festival, Alberta
- Suoni Por Il Popolo, Montreal QC
- Place Gabriel, Paris, France
- Stanford University, CA
- Cal Arts, Valencia CA
- Mimi Jazz Salon, Los Angeles CA
- Meet the Composer, New York City NY
- Radio Canada
- National Public Radio
