= Nelson Delle-Vigne Fabbri =

Italian pianist and music educator

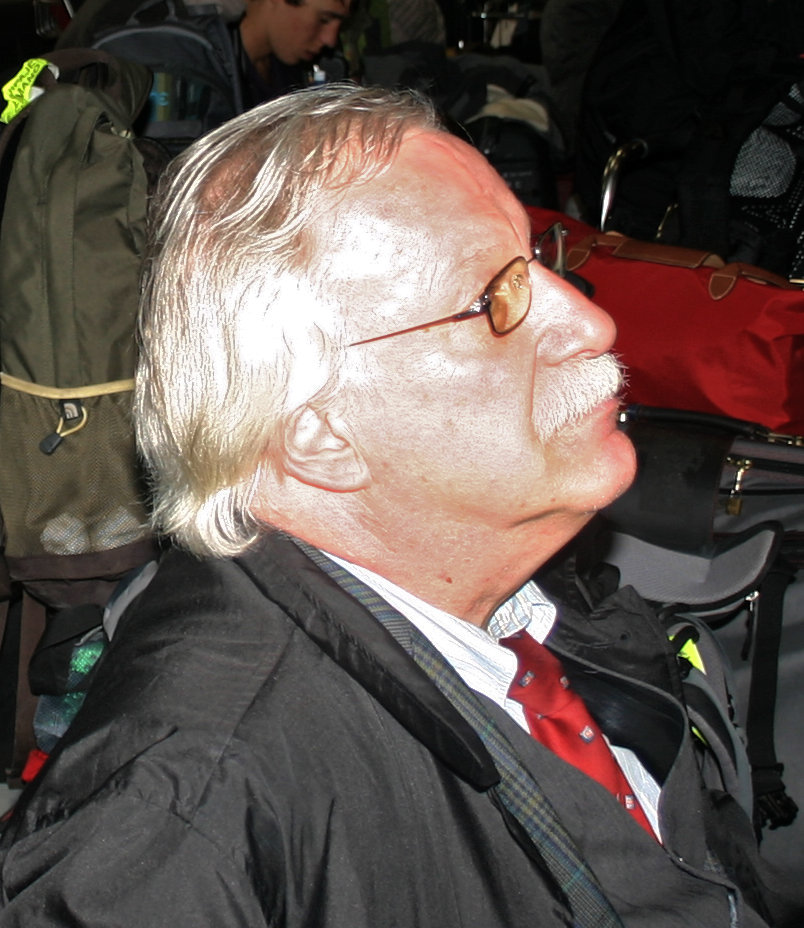
Nelson Delle-Vigne Fabbri

Nelson Delle-Vigne Fabbri (born in 1949) is an Italian classical pianist and pedagogue.

== Biography ==
Born in Argentina, after studying the piano with Magda Tagliaferro, György Cziffra and Claudio Arrau, Delle-Vigne Fabbri embarks on a career of concertist and pedagogue. He teaches at the École Normale de Musique de Paris (Alfred Cortot), the Queen Elisabeth Music Chapel and gives master classes in South Korea, Spain, the United States, France, Greece, Italy, the Netherlands, Portugal and Switzerland. He is also co-founder, artistic director and general coordinator of the International Certificate for Piano Artists, high level educational program chaired by Philippe Entremont and co-organized by the École Normale de Musique de Paris and the music faculty of the University of Florida. Delle-Vigne Fabbri is also artistic director of the Bell'Arte Foundation of Braine-l'Alleud in Belgium. During his career as a virtuoso pianist, Delle-Vigne Fabbri has premiered numerous works by European, American and South American composers.
