= Conrad Vernon Field =

Baseball venue in Longview, Texas, US

Coordinates: 32.462335°N 94.728602°W

Conrad Vernon Field is a baseball venue located in Longview, Texas and home to the LeTourneau Yellow Jackets college baseball team in the American Southwest Conference. The ballpark holds a capacity of 200.
