= Alvin O. Austin =

American academic administrator

Alvin O. "Bud" Austin (born January 6, 1942 in Tampa, Florida) was the fifth president of LeTourneau University in Longview, Texas from 1986 to 2007. Since July 2007 he has held the role of University Chancellor, in accordance with the wishes of the Board of Trustees.

== Life ==
He was raised in Florida and Utah before attending Westmont College in Santa Barbara, California, graduating in 1964. He was named Alumnus of the year in 1986 by this institution. He graduated from the University of Mississippi with a PhD in higher education. He married Samantha Jane Bates in 1965 and has three children.

== Career ==
Austin's career has been primarily in the administration of institutions of higher learning, having spent over thirty years working at a variety of schools including North Park College and Theological Seminary in Chicago, Seattle Pacific University in Washington, and Hardin-Simmons University in Abilene, Texas. Austin has a PhD in Higher Education Administration from University of Mississippi and a master's degree from California State University in Los Angeles. His early career was grounded in student affairs administration.

He guided LeTourneau University over two decades in its transition from a small regional technical college to one of the leading Christian universities in the USA. During his tenure, LeTourneau grew dramatically in enrollment, endowment, campus facilities, programs, and scope. Austin's career focused on providing a high quality and personal educational environment with an uncompromising dedication to committed Christian faith. He retired in 2007.

He is the acting president of the American Southwest Conference Executive Committee: a conference of sixteen colleges and universities located in Arkansas, Louisiana, Mississippi and Texas which are members of the NCAA Division III athletic conference. Austin is also a member of the Board of Directors of the Independent Colleges and Universities of Texas (ICUT).

He continues to provide consulting services for small and medium-sized colleges and universities. He travels widely and maintains his primary residence in the Longview area near his children and grandchildren.
