= Children at Risk =

U.S. non-profit organization

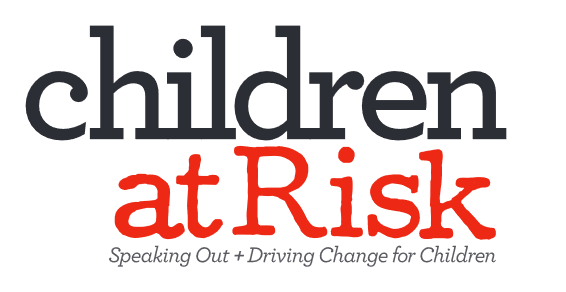
- Formation: 1989
- Type: Non-profit
- Purpose: To improve the quality of life for children through strategic research, public policy analysis, education, collaboration and advocacy.
- Location: Houston, Texas
- President/CEO: Dr. Bob Sanborn
- Website: childrenatrisk.org

Children At Risk is a 501(c)(3) non-profit organization that drives changes for children through research, education, and influencing public policy. Founded in 1989 in Houston, Texas and with an office opened in North Texas in 2011, the organization focuses on the well-being of children and educates legislators on the importance of solving children's issues. Its primary issues are human trafficking, food insecurity, education, and parenting. Children At Risk also has a North Texas office in Dallas, Texas. Some of Children At Risk's previous primary issues were juvenile justice, mental health, and Latino children.

The mission is to improve the quality of life for children through strategic research, public policy analysis, education, collaboration, and advocacy. The organization strives to make children's needs a priority and to ensure ample resources are available for children and their families to thrive.

== History ==
Children At Risk began in the fall of 1989.

== Issue areas ==
=== Human trafficking ===
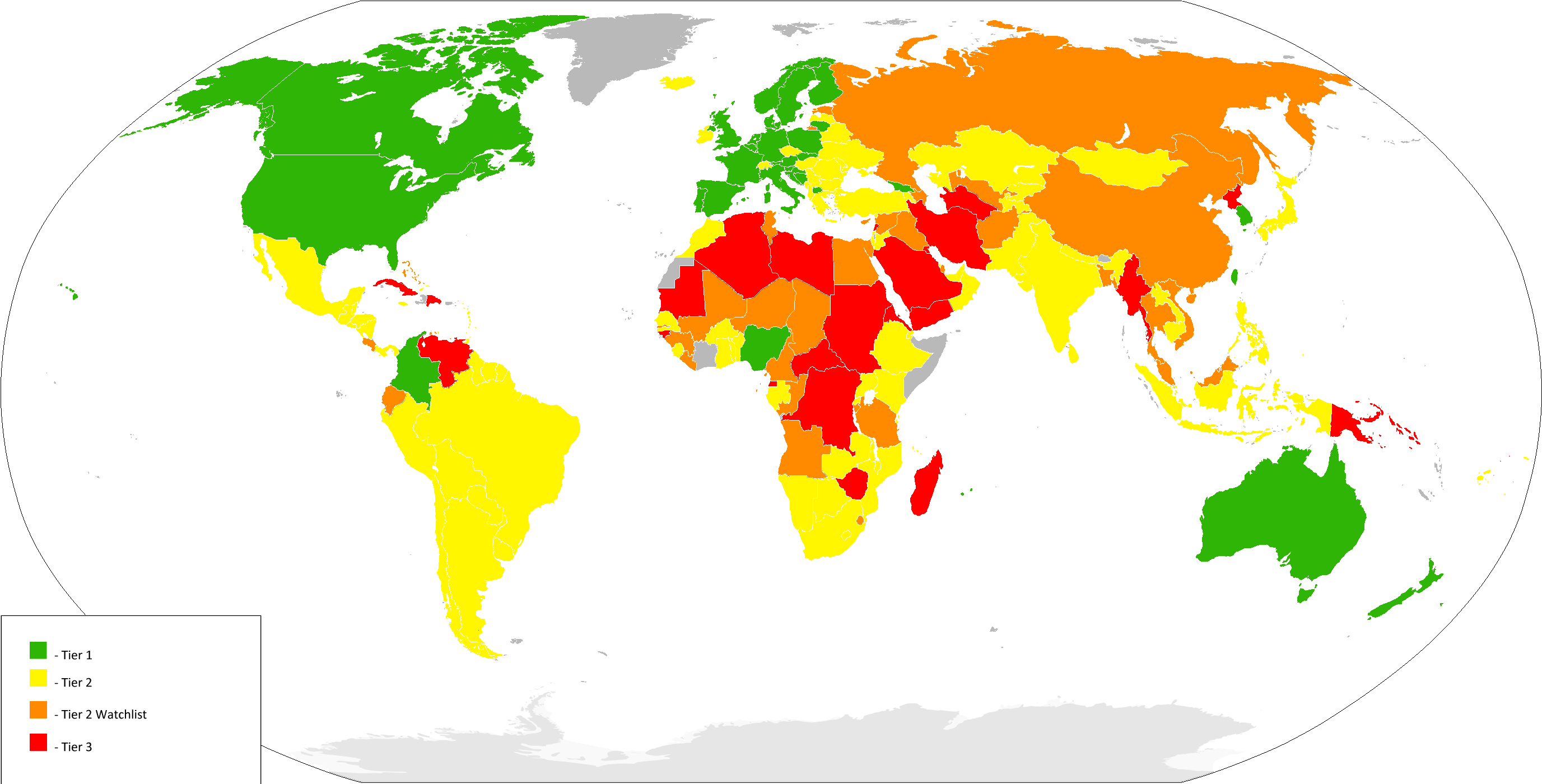
US State Department rankings based on response to human trafficking.

Having witnessed a need for policy changes in the area of human trafficking, Children At Risk has worked with public officials at the state capitol to strengthen the anti-trafficking laws in Texas since 2007. In addition, Children At Risk has worked collaboratively with others to launch a broad educational and outreach campaign to combat human trafficking.

To raise awareness on child trafficking in Texas, Children At Risk' has:

- Launched expansive educational outreach campaigns in Houston, Dallas, and Brownsville through press conferences, public service announcements, and billboards. In 2008, Children At Risk generated over 330 media hits focused solely on human trafficking.
- Directly educated over 1,000 community leaders, lawyers, and judges over the past year on the trafficking and exploitation of children and ways to identify victims through two State Summits, continuing legal education seminars, and trainings for CPS employees, juvenile probation officers, school guidance counselors as well as social work and legal students.

Children At Risk researched, drafted, and helped to pass several key pieces of legislation to strengthen the laws surrounding human trafficking. As a result, Texas law has:

- Mandated that bars and nuisance hotels/motels post a sign about forced labor and include the number for the national human trafficking hotline number
- Designated a statewide human trafficking task force to improve data collection and align existing state resources to fight human trafficking
- Mandated training of law enforcement officers to enable them to identify trafficking victims
- Required a study of alternatives to the juvenile justice system for victims
- Created a victim assistance program for domestic human trafficking victims
- Created liability for the trafficker regardless of whether he knew the victim was a minor

Children At Risk continues to research and draft legislation following recommendations from Shared Hope International.

=== Food insecurity ===
Children At Risk has proposed that the Texas Legislature require schools with student populations of 80% or more living at or below 185% of the federal poverty level to provide free school breakfast to all interested students. The 80% threshold is useful as it allows school districts to utilize the "severe need" designation and receive a higher federal reimbursement rate per student meal. Schools that serve 60% or more of their meals at a free or reduced price are classified as "severe need". This threshold also allows economies of scale to lower the per-meal cost provided to students, due to the higher volume of meal production and consumption. In the 2010 school year, all "severe need" schools received the following federal reimbursement: $0.26 for each paid breakfast, $1.76 for each free breakfast and $1.46 for each reduced-price breakfast. The price of breakfast for students varies across the state from 20 cents for reduced price meals to $1.25 for full price.

=== Education ===
==== Charter schools ====
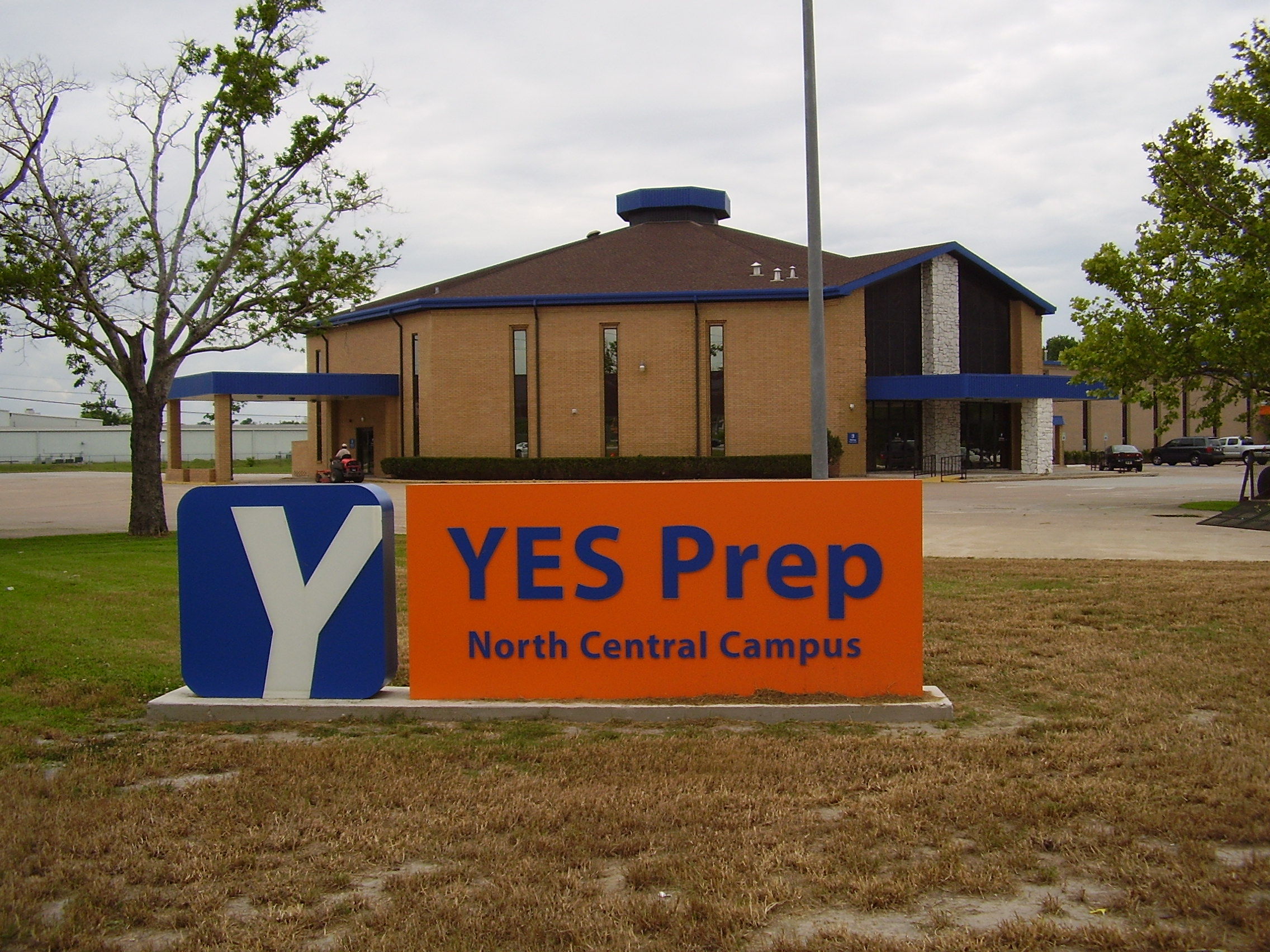
YES Prep North Central, a charter school based in Houston

Using a combination of research, analysis, and public policy, the Public Education team at Children At Risk works to raise awareness about underperforming charter schools in Houston. While Children At Risk has recognized charter schools like KIPP and YES Prep among the top ten public schools in the city of Houston, clusters of low-performing charters are consistently found at the bottom of the annual public school rankings.

==== School rankings ====
The purpose of Children At Risk's school rankings is to both provide a tool to parents and students regarding the quality of local schools and to give information to campuses and districts on how they perform relative to their peers. To evaluate the performance of public schools across the state, Children At Risk examines sixteen indicators at the high school level, twelve at the middle school level, and sixteen at the elementary level.

Children At Risk ranks schools across the state of Texas and Alabama.

=== Parenting and child abuse ===
The Center for Parenting and Family Well-Being advocates to change the way parent education and child abuse prevention is approached in the greater Houston community through prevention and population-based strategies.

== Past issue areas ==
=== Juvenile justice ===
Children At Risk has started numerous initiatives to ensure that the rights of juvenile delinquents in the Texas and Houston are not being infringed upon. Children At Risk has helped establish mental health and drug courts and attempted to reduce adult certifications and misdemeanor Class C ticketing.

==== Mental health ====
Children At Risk conducted the first independent evaluation of the four Juvenile Mental Health Courts in Texas. The report provided a comparison of quality, cost, and effectiveness of services compared to incarceration, best practices utilized and methods of creation and expansion to provide a road map for counties to establish or improve current juvenile mental health courts. The research has provided needed data for child advocates to maintain or increase funding for community-based mental health services.

Children At Risk also hosted two events, in Dallas and Houston, to educate community members on the topic of Juvenile Mental Health. This brought together mental health experts, state and local stakeholders, community members, advocates, and school representatives to discuss Juvenile Mental Health.

==== Adult certification ====
Children At Risk drafted and advocated for a bill to increase the time for reviewing juveniles in order for the decision to try them as adults to be better informed. When children are unnecessarily transferred to adult courts they frequently suffer more than if they were tried as juveniles.

==== Class C ticketing ====
Class C tickets are often issued in schools for behavioral problems such as disturbing class or skipping school. Misdemeanor charges are harsh penalties for such minor issues. Children At Risk is working to reduce the prevalence of Class C ticketing in schools by conducting interviews with students, parents, and teachers, and collaborating with key organizations working on the issue across the state of Texas.

=== Latino children ===
Children At Risk also encourages greater focus on the unique needs of Latino children across all sectors, including fostering greater academic focus through the first edition of its online, open-access, peer-reviewed Journal of Applied Research on Children.

== Legislative priorities ==
A selected list of Children At Risk's legislative priorities for the 85th Texas Legislative Session are below.

Parenting

- Establish a task force to examine and increase access to evidence-based parent education and quality parent engagement programs in Texas, as well as improve inter-agency coordination between the Texas Health and Human Services Commission, the Texas Workforce Commission, Texas Education Agency, and the Texas Department of Family and Protective Services.

Early Childhood Education

Child Care

- Increase coordination of state-funded child care and public Pre-K data systems at the Texas Education Agency and the Texas Workforce Commission through the Early Childhood Database System to improve outcomes for children and maximize taxpayer dollars.
- Increase transparency by requiring the Texas Workforce Commission to report how state dollars are being spent, including the number and percentage of children receiving subsidies that are participating in high quality child care settings to parents and policy makers.
- Increase local coordination of early education programs by supporting public/private partnerships between school districts and high quality child care centers.

Pre-Kindergarten

- Sustain the High Quality Pre-Kindergarten Grant Program at $236 million for the biennium.
- Create sustainable funding for quality Pre-K through formula funding.
- Expand Pre-K eligibility to children whose parents are whose first responders and have been killed or injured during duty
- Limit Pre-K classrooms to a maximum of 22 students, allowing no more than 11 students for each teacher or aide in Pre-K classes with more than 15 students.
- Increase inter-agency coordination of child care and Pre-K data systems through the Early Childhood Database System to improve outcomes for children and maximize efficiency of taxpayer dollars.
- Increase public/private partnerships between school districts and high quality child care centers.

Expanded Learning Opportunities

- Extend the Expanded Learning Opportunities Council for four additional years to examine the efficacy of a longer school day/longer school year and to examine best practices for public/private partnerships.

Health

- Establish a workgroup to provide school districts with best practices on recess. Require school districts to develop a locally determined school recess policy.

Human Trafficking

- Set aside convictions of victims of human trafficking for non-violent crimes committed as a direct result of trafficking
- Streamline processes for landlords to evict tenants who are engaged in trafficking activity on leased property.
- Target unlicensed "massage establishments" for deceptive trade practices.
- Improve the curriculum of court-ordered programs for consumers of prostitution to highlight child sex trafficking.
- Establish a statewide data collection system to track all prostitution-related crimes, including crimes related to minors.
- Strengthen the civil nuisance and abatement statutes to enable local governments to more effectively shut down illegal sexually oriented businesses.
- Criminalize the online promotion of prostitution and increase awareness and enforcement of state and federal laws related to online child sex trafficking.

== Centers ==
=== Public Policy and Law Center ===
The Public Policy and Law Center (PPLC) was established in 2006 as an outgrowth of Children At Risk's longtime research and advocacy work and in response to the American Bar Association’s appeal to the private bar, "[to] get involved and use its legal expertise on behalf of Houston's children." The mission of Children At Risk's Public Policy and Law Center is to improve the lives of children across Texas through:

- Legal and policy research and advocacy;
- Legislative and administrative rule drafting;
- Drafting of amicus briefs and impact litigation; and,
- Continuing education for attorneys and other professionals on children's legal and policy issues.

=== Center to End the Trafficking and Exploitation of Children ===
The Center to End the Trafficking and Exploitation of Children (CETEC), the only center of its kind in Texas, was established in 2007 to combat domestic minor sex trafficking through education, the convening of nonprofits and community leaders, and non-partisan advocacy to curb demand and support victims.

=== Center for Parenting and Family Well-Being ===
The Center for Parenting and Family Well-Being is supported by an Academic Advisory Council of six leading academics, pediatricians, and public health practitioners who are experts in child maltreatment prevention, cost-effectiveness research, evaluation, family demography, policy, evidence-based programs, and dissemination. The Academic Advisory Council oversees the Center's research activities.

== Funding and events ==
Children At Risk is funded through grants, private donations, and several fundraising events put on throughout the year.

=== Stand Up for Houston’s Children ===
Stand Up for Houston's Children benefits Children At Risk's Public Policy and Law Center – the only such center in Texas devoted to the legal needs of children. The evening includes cocktails, a live auction and dinner served against a backdrop of live comedy entertainment. Jay Leno was the main act in 2012, and in 2013 the main act was comedian and impressionist Frank Caliendo.

=== Accolades luncheon ===
The Accolades Luncheon is an annual luncheon that honors Houstonians for the work they do in speaking out for children.

=== Charity Golf Classic ===
The Golf Classic is a four-person Florida scramble following lunch with on-course activities and an awards celebration with a dinner buffet and live auction immediately following the tournament. Melissa Wilson of Fox News KRIV has been the host of the Golf Classic for the past several years.

== Leadership ==
Dr. Bob Sanborn is the president and CEO of Children At Risk and has held that title since 2005. Dr. Charlotte Carlisle is the managing director of the North Texas office.

A board of directors composed of prominent community members oversees Children At Risk, and several other boards oversee various aspects of the organization. There is the Public Policy Advisory Board, the Law Advisory Board, the Children At Risk Institute, and an Advisory Board that oversees the North Texas office.
