= Margherita Torretta =

Italian concert pianist (born 1986)

Margherita Torretta (3 November 1986, in Castel San Giovanni, Italy) is an Italian concert pianist. Although she began training as a pianist relatively late in life, she rapidly attained the status of worldwide performer. She is currently based in London.

== Early years and education ==
Margherita Torretta approaches classical dance in her childhood in a local dance academy.

At 14 she won two scholarships at the Fondazione Teatro Nuovo in Turin, setting her heart on becoming a professional classical dancer.

In those years she approached piano, fashion and photography.

However, at 18 years old her life was suddenly changed by a fire which she barely escaped from. The burns she suffered made her unable to walk for several months. It is while she was recovering that she started dedicating herself to piano. This new interest replaced her former passion for dance.

Margherita Torretta started her formal training at Conservatorio "Giuseppe Nicolini" in Piacenza, graduating with distinction at the age of 25. Afterwards, Margherita Torretta was admitted at the Lake Como International Piano Academy, working intensively for 5 years with maestro William Grant Naboré. She was the second Italian woman pianist after Alessandra Ammara, and the only Italian woman of her generation, who took part at this institution. She attended there masterclasses with Charles Rosen, Fou Ts'ong, Stanislav Ioudenitch, Malcolm Bilson and Dimitri Bashkirov.

In 2015 she was admitted at Conservatorio Giuseppe Verdi in Milan, working closely with Cristina Frosini, but she never attended the final exam.

In 2017 The German foundation Theo Lieven gave her a substantial scholarship to attend the master of performance and interpretation at the University of Music in Lugano in Switzerland, ended with honors.

In the years 2018 and 2019 Margherita Torretta was a member of ICPA, the International Certificate for Piano Artists under the direction of Nelson delle Vigne-Fabbri, with Jerome Lowenthal as president. Here she received advise from Michelle Beroff, Eugen Indjic, Bruno Rigutto, Piotr Folkert, Mikhail Karpov, Roberta Rust, Irena Kofman and Juan Olaya.

== Artistic activities ==
Margherita Torretta has performed in more than 20 countries as Italy, Switzerland, Austria, France, Germany, Spain, Portugal, England, Scotland, Lithuania, Poland, USA, Australia, Japan, etc. and in venues such as Carnegie Hall in New York, Sala Verdi and Villa Reale in Milan, Steinway Hall in London, Ehrbar Saal in Wien, College of the Tchaikovsky Conservatory in Moscow, ALTI Hall in Kyoto, at the Palm Beach Atlantic University in Florida, at the University Alfonso El Sabio in Madrid, at the foundation Bellarte in Brussels, the Fryderych Chopin Institute in Warsaw.

Margherita Torretta received the first degree diploma and the Carnegie Hall memorial medal in 2016 by the Debut piano competition in New York.

Margherita Torretta's interest in visual arts and photography led her to collaborate in 2018 with the British photographer Sophie Mayenne in the project "Behind The Scars".

She posed in front of the camera showing her scars on her legs; her aim was to present a feminine beauty that deviates from the models of aesthetic perfection that are common nowadays. The project was censored for a while by Facebook and Instagram in June 2019.

Margherita Torretta recorded live concerts on important radio broadcasters, among which Rai Radio 3, RSI Radiotelevisione svizzera and Radio France Musique.

In January 2023, she released her second album "Colours of Venice" with the label Academy Classical Music.

Excerpts from her last album were broadcast by Rai Radio3 and by the Luxembourg Radio 100,7.

Together with writer Anna Codega, she wrote a novel inspired by her personal story, "Rimmel", published by Edizioni Pendragon on 29th March 2024.

== Discography ==
- "Colours of Venice - Baldassarre Galuppi", Academy Classical Music, January 2023
- "Scarlatti - 20 Keyboard Sonatas", with Artalinna and Music Academy Production. It was released in February 2020.
- "Elisabetta De Gambarini: Complete Works for Keyboard", Piano Classics, November 2024
