= International Certificate for Piano Artists =

Information
- Established: 2000
- Founder: Nelson Delle-Vigne Fabbri
- President: Jean Kluger

The International Certificate for Piano Artists is an international certification program for high level pianists. Its goal is to bring its participants to higher performing capabilities, while upholding the importance of artistry. It is in collaboration with various universities and conservatories from around the world, such as the École Normale de Musique de Paris, Palm Beach Atlantic University, Boston University, Harvard College, University of Ottawa, College of the Moscow Conservatory, the Lithuanian Academy of Music and Theatre, Żelazowa Wola, the National Taiwan Symphony Orchestra and many other institutions.

== Faculty ==
The current faculty of professors acts as the permanent body that teaches and continuously supports the participants. It includes: Jerome Lowenthal as vice president, Nelson Delle-Vigne Fabbri as artistic director and founder, François-René Duchâble, Michel Béroff, Jean-Philippe Collard, Josep Colom, Eugen Indjic, Boaz Sharon, Daniel Blumenthal, Bruno Rigutto, Piotr Folkert, Mikhail Karpov, Robert Roux, Roberta Rust and Irena Kaufman. Former professors include: Philippe Entremont (as former president), Lazar Berman, France Clidat as former co-vice president, Jean-Michel Damase, Einar Steen-Nøkleberg, Stéphane Lemelin, David Lively.

== Locations ==
Due to the international nature of the organization, the sessions are help in various locations around the world. They are most frequently held in the Fondation Bell'Arte in Belgium, the École Normale de Musique de Paris, Żelazowa Wola and Radziejowice Castle in Poland, the Palm Beach Atlantic University's School of Music and Fine Arts in Florida, the Lithuanian Academy of Music and Theatre in Vilnius, and the College of the Moscow Conservatory in Russia.

== Admission ==
Admission to the program is selective and competitive. The program is aimed at pianists who, at a minimum, hold a bachelor's degree (or equivalent) from a music conservatory or a university. The admission process requires an audition, which can be either pre-recorded or performed live. Live auditions are held in conjunction with the teaching sessions at various locations. The program is open to pianists of all ages.

== Artists-in-residence ==
The ICPA program currently has six artists-in-residence: Julien Libeer, Arvindan Thekkadath, Kyung-ah Kim, Elodie Vignon, Allan Manhas, Anait Karpova.
