= Ralph Mullins =

American jazz musician

Ralph K. Mullins aka Diz Mullins (born 10 May 1929 in Tulsa) is an American jazz trumpet player, arranger, composer, and collegiate educator. He grew up in Oklahoma but spent most of his professional career in the Los Angeles area. After seventy-two years of playing trumpet in Southern California, Mullins is still playing and leads his own band.

== Career highlights ==
Around 1954, Mullins moved to Los Angeles, where he began playing with the Tommy Alexander Band. The jazz musicians he performed with include Dave Wells, Lanny Morgan, Bob Hathaway, and Don Bagley. Mullins played trumpet and arranged for four years with Charlie Barnet's Big Band. He also performed with Anita O’Day's Sextet, Woody Herman, Sy Zentner, Russ Morgan, and Freddy Martin, with whom he worked a year on a TV show and two years at the Coconut Grove.

Mullins has scored over 400 feature films including Rocky I, II, and III, Barbra Streisand's A Star Is Born, Roots, the TV mini series, The Autobiography of Jane Pitman, The Merv Griffin Show, and The Hollywood Palace. He scored for Frank Sinatra, Sarah Vaughan, Rosemary Clooney, recorded with Charlie Barnet's Big Band (five albums) alongside of Maynard Ferguson, Al Porcino, and Buddy Childers. In scoring and performing, he has worked with numerous TV shows including Bonanza, Red Skelton, Smothers Brothers, Andy Griffith, Matlock, Perry Mason, and has also worked with Quincy Jones, Dave Grusin, Elmer Bernstein.

== Educator ==
Mullins was a member of the Film Scoring Department faculty at the University of Southern California from 1996 to 2006. He has also taught at the Dick Grove School of Music.

== Formal education ==
- Studied music, music education, psychology at the University of Tulsa from 1947 to 1951
- University of Oklahoma, Bachelor of Music Education
- University of Southern California, studied music

== Selected discography ==
As trumpet sideman

- Charlie Barnet, Lonely Street, Verve MGV2040 (1956) OCLC 28885884

First session: recorded September 24, 1956, Hollywood, California
Carleton McBeath, Conrad Gozzo, Ralph Mullins (trumpets); Richard Nash, Dave Wells, Bob Burgess, Ernest Small (trombones); Charlie Barnet (sax, leader), Willie Smith (alto sax); Willis "Bill" Leonard Holman (Bill Holman's brother) (tenor saxes); Bob Dawes (bari sax); William Miller, Norman Pockrandt, Russ Garcia (pianists); Robert Bain (guitar); Eudice Shapiro, Robert Sushel, Amerigo Rickey Marino, William R. Kurasch, Tibor Zelig, Benny Gill (violins); Allan Harshman, Louis Kievman, Dan Lube (violas); Raphael Ray Kramer (cello); Red Wootten (bass); Bill Richmond (drums); Russ Garcia (arranger)

20405-4: "The moon was yellow," arranged by Russ Garcia
20406-11: "Myna," arranged by Russ Garcia
20407-6: "You'd be so nice to come home to," arranged by Russ Garcia
20408-10: "Phyllysse," arranged by Russ Garcia

Second session: recorded November 8, 1956, Hollywood, California
Maynard Ferguson, Ralph Mullins, Carleton McBeath, Oliver Mitchell (trumpets); Leroy Anderson, Dave Wells, Bob Burgess, Richard Nash (trombones); Charlie Barnet (sax, leader); Willie Smith, Dick Paladino (alto saxes); Bill Holman (tenor sax, arranger), William Trujillo (tenor saxes); Bob Dawes (bari sax); Norman Pockrandt (piano); Barney Kessel (guitar); Red Wootten (bass); Alvin Stoller (drums); Billy May, Buddy Childers (arranger)

20460-5: "Blue rose," arranged by Bill Holman
20461-4: "Lemon twist," arranged by Bill Holman
20462-2: "Lumby," arranged by Billy May
20463-2: "Hear me talkin' to you," arranged by Buddy Childers

- Charlie Barnet

Diz Mullins, Jack Hohlman, Art Depew, Bobby Clark (trumpets); (3 trombonists); Charlie Barnet (sax, leader, arranger); Bob Jung, Bob Dawes (woodwinds); 2 or 3 others (woodwinds); Fred Massey (piano); Don Prell (bass); Don Manning (drums); Lynn Franklin (vocal); Andy Gibson, Paul Villepigue, Bill Holman, Neal Hefti, Ralph Burns, Tiny Kahn, Manny Albam, Billy May (arrangers)
Recorded May 30 thru June 8, 1957, Saltair Ballroom, Salt Lake City
KDYL broadcast, June 5, 1957, Saltair Ballroom, Salt Lake City
Russ Garcia added to the preceding personnel

- Charlie Barnet Orchestra: Record Hop, (film soundtrack featuring Charlie Barnet and His Orchestra), Zephyrhills, Florida: Joyce Records LP3001 (1957) (OCLC 30860797)

Diz Mullins (trumpet); Charlie Barnet (sax, leader); Fred Massey (piano); Tex Williams, Alan Copeland, Ella Mae Morse (vocals); Manny Albam, Russ Garcia (arrangers); The Lancers (vocal group); others not listed
Recorded October 1957, Hollywood, California

- Charlie Barnet, One Night Stand, Joyce Records LP1052, 1008 OCLC 30833687

Diz Mullins, Al Porcino, Sanford Skinner, Stu Williamson (trumpets); Walt Malzahn, Dave Wells, Frank Lane (trombones); Charlie Barnet (sax, leader); Bob Jung, Lanny Morgan (alto sax); Jack Kernan, Dave Madden (tenor saxes); Bob Dawes (bari sax); Buddy Motsinger (piano); Harry Babasin (bass); Jack Sperling (drums); Lynn Franklin (vocal); Bill Holman (arranger)
KFI broadcast, September 5, 1958, Hollywood Palladium

As arranger

- Amy Grant, A Christmas to Remember, with the Patrick Williams Orchestra, A&M Records (1999) OCLC 42666401

Mullins contributed to the Los Angeles music preparation (transcribing, scoring)

- Horatio, Capitol P-2489 (May 1969) OCLC 732363395

Side A: "I can't be a cowboy if I can't carry a gun," composed by Joan Mullins & Robert O. Williams, arranged by Ralph Mullins (matrix 45-S-72097-A1)
Side B: "The golden rule" (matrix 45-S-72098-A1)
