= Robert Sanborn =

American activist (born 1959)

- Born: 1959 (age 66–67)
- Education: Florida State University; Columbia University
- Occupation: President/CEO of Children at Risk
- Spouse: Ellen Sanborn

Robert Sanborn is a nationally known activist for education and children and is the President/CEO of Children At Risk in Houston, Texas. He has been president since 2005. Sanborn was born in Caribou, Maine and raised in Puerto Rico.

Sanborn served on the staff and/or faculties of Rice University (Associate Dean & Faculty), Hampshire College (Dean & Faculty), Columbia University (Staff & Faculty), the University of Tulsa (Vice President & Faculty), Emory University (Staff) and the University of Massachusetts (Faculty). He also served as the CEO of the Education Foundation of Harris County where his accomplishments included a significant rise in resources, partnerships and visibility for urban public education.

He earned his undergraduate degree at Florida State University and his doctorate at Columbia University in New York City. He has also served as an advisor and board member to numerous non-profit organizations.

Dr. Sanborn has pushed to expand CHILDREN AT RISK. Notable achievements include opening up centers in Dallas and Fort Worth; launching the Public Policy & Law Center, the CHILDREN AT RISK Institute, the Center for Parenting and Family Well-Being and the Center to End Trafficking and Exploitation of Children; directing significantly increased media attention to the issues championed by the organization; and increasing the organizational capacity to drive macro-level change to improve the lives of Texas’ most defenseless children. Sanborn is the Executive Editor of two peer-reviewed, open access academic journals, the Journal of Applied Research on Children and the Journal of Family Strengths. He is also the host of the popular radio program and podcast Growing Up in America on the Pacifica Radio Network.

Dr. Sanborn is an editor of Growing Up in Houston and has authored 12 books and over forty articles on education, career development and related education topics. He has hosted his own radio and television programs, and has spoken to numerous conferences, civic, business, education, and student groups on a variety of topics.

On May 1, 2009, the University of Houston–Downtown announced that Sanborn was one of four candidates to become the next president of the university. He is currently an adjunct professor of Leadership in Non-Profit Organizations and Resourcing the Non-Profit Organization at UHD.

Dr. Sanborn was awarded the 2017 Humanitarian of the Year award by the Albert Schweitzer Fellowship on April 19, 2017
