= Myles W. Scoggins =

American academic administrator

Myles W. Scoggins was the 16th president of the Colorado School of Mines. He was appointed to the position in June 2006.

== Background ==
He has over 34 years experience in the global oil and gas business with Mobil and ExxonMobil. Dr. Scoggins began has career with Mobil in 1970 and had assignments throughout the United States, as well as in The Hague, Jakarta, Indonesia and London. He was president of International E & P and Global Exploration and a member of the executive committee of Mobil Oil prior to its merger with Exxon in late 1999. Following the merger, he served as executive vice president of ExxonMobil Production Company until his retirement in 2004.

Dr. Scoggins served on the board of directors for Questar Corporation, a natural gas company, and Trico Marine Services, Inc., a global provider of marine support to the offshore oil and gas industry.

He is a member of the board of directors of Colorado’s Renewable Energy Authority and the Colorado Oil and Gas Association.

== Education ==
Scoggins received his undergraduate education at the University of Tulsa, where he was in the petroleum engineering honors program and was a member of Tau Beta Pi. He received his master's degree in petroleum engineering from the University of Oklahoma, and his Ph.D. degrees in petroleum engineering at the University of Tulsa.

== ExxonMobil Clean Air Act violation ==
While serving as executive vice president for ExxonMobil in Houston, Scoggins as an officer received a notice of violation letter dated January 19, 2001 from EPA Region 6 citing section 113 (a)(1) of the Federal Clean Air Act for alleged NSR violations at the Baytown Refinery. These and other continuing environmental violations by ExxonMobil were settled in a consent decree in 2005. Under the settlement, ExxonMobil will implement innovative pollution control technologies to reduce emissions of nitrogen oxides, sulfur dioxide, and particulate matter from refinery process units. ExxonMobil also will adopt facility-wide enhanced benzene waste monitoring and fugitive emission control programs. In addition, ExxonMobil will pay a $7.7 million civil penalty for settlement of the claims in the complaint. Finally, ExxonMobil will undertake $6.7 million in federal and state environmentally-beneficial projects.
