= Victor Udwin =

American academic

- Born: Victor Morris Udwin; 1953 (age 72–73); Bedford, England
- Occupations: Author, Professor
- Notable work: Between Two Armies: The Place of the Duel in Epic Culture

Victor Morris Udwin (born 1953) is an American author and professor of German and Comparative literature at the University of Tulsa, where he has been teaching since 1990. He has written several publications including Between Two Armies: The Place of the Duel in Epic Culture in 1999, "Autopoiesis and Poetry" in Textuality and Subjectivity: Essays on Language and Being, as well as writing several sections of The Nibelungen Tradition: An Encyclopedia, in addition to several other publications.

Born in England to South African parents, his family moved to South Africa when Udwin was three months old. His family then moved to the United States when Udwin was six years of age. After attending University of California, Irvine for two years, he transferred to University of California, Berkeley. He received his BA, MA, and PhD from UC Berkeley in 1976, 1980 and 1985, respectively.

== List of Publications ==
- Between Two Armies: The Place of the Duel in Epic Culture (1999)
- "Battle," "Conflict," "Destruction," "Duel," "Giant," "Numbers," "urliuge," "Heroic Age," "Oral Poetry," and "Traditional Narrative Material," in The Nibelungen Tradition: An Encyclopedia (2000)
- "Autopoiesis and Poetry," in Textuality and Subjectivity: Essays on Language and Being (1991)
- "Der materiale Signifikant," in Materialität der Kommunikation (1988)
- "Reading the Red Ball—A Phenomenology of Narrative Processes," in Papers in Comparative Literature (1988): pages 115–26
- "Reading and Writing—the Rhetoric of Reversal," Reader 17 (1987): pages 5–16
