= Dale A. Lunsford =

Dr. Dale A. Lunsford has been the Chancellor of LeTourneau University in Longview, Texas since February 1, 2021.

== Education ==
Lunsford earned both his Bachelor of Science and Master of Business Administration degrees from the University of Tulsa. He earned his PhD in Business Administration from Oklahoma State University and did post-doctoral work as a visiting scholar at the University of Texas at Austin.

== Career ==
Prior to his appointment at LeTourneau University, Lunsford served as vice president for student affairs and extreme relations at the University of Texas at Tyler. He worked at UT-Tyler for eight years. Before that, he worked for 12 years as a faculty member and administrator at the University of Tulsa, where he was associate dean and director of undergraduate programs for the College of Business Administration. He also was a business professor and published several research studies and served as editor of a marketing education journal. He co-hosted a popular "Business World" radio program for seven years on a National Public Radio affiliate in Tulsa.

== Publications ==
Lunsford has written op-eds for the following publications:

- "Headlines Highlight Need for Mental Health Services" Longview News-Journal, 2015
- "Good Thoughts for Hard Times From R.G. LeTourneau", Christian Post, Oct. 3, 2013
- "Missing Your College Freshman? Maybe This Helps", Christian Post, Sept. 11, 2013.

== Interviews ==
Lunsford has provided in-depth interrogations for the following:

- Warren Smith of World Media's "Listening In" Radio Program, March 6, 2015.
- "The Complete Story" with Dick Bott on BOTT Radio Network, March 2015
- "Faith Can Work" Two Ten Magazine, 2Q, 2013
- "Medical Mission from Longview Serves Hundreds in Ethiopia" Longview News-Journal, April 30, 2011
