= Michael Kitces =

American financial advisor

Michael Kitces is an American financial planner, commentator, speaker, blogger, and educator. He frequently contributes to industry publications, publishes a blog and newsletter for advisors, is the former practitioner editor of the Journal of Financial Planning, the co-founder of the XY Planning Network (4 times on the Inc. 5000 list at #168 [2018], #553 [2019], #1130 [2020], and #1179 [2021]) and AdvicePay, and is the Head of Planning Strategy at Buckingham Wealth Partners, a financial advisory firm. He has also been repeatedly featured (from 2017 to 2022) as #1 on Investopedia's "most influential" advisors list.

== Biography ==
Kitces was born and raised in the suburbs of Washington, D.C.

== Education ==
He earned a Bachelor's in Psychology from Bates College in Maine with a minor in theater, and subsequently earned a Master's in Financial Planning from The American College (Pennsylvania) and a Master's in Taxation from the University of Tulsa. He also holds the CFP®, CLU®, ChFC®, RHU®, REBC®, and CASL® designations.

== Career ==
He is the Head of Planning Strategy at Buckingham Wealth Partners.

In 2004, Kitces helped to co-found NexGen, a community group for younger financial planners and later went on to co-found the XY Planning Network and AdvicePay as well, with the former being recognized as #168 on the Inc. 5000 list of fastest-growing companies in 2018. For these accomplishments, he was recognized by the Financial Planning Association with a "Heart of Financial Planning" award in 2012, as well as by Investment News as a 40-under-40 to watch in 2014 and an Industry Innovator in 2016.

From 2012 to 2015, he served as the Practitioner Editor of the Journal of Financial Planning, after spending many years on its Editorial Review Board.

Kitces' research on safe withdrawal rates, asset allocation glidepaths in retirement, and determining sustainable retirement income based on market valuation has been cited by The Wall Street Journal, Money.com, and received an Academic Thought Leadership award from the Retirement Income Industry Association (RIIA) in 2013.

== Personal life ==
He lives in Reston, Virginia with his wife and three children.
