= Joseph Shore =

American opera singer

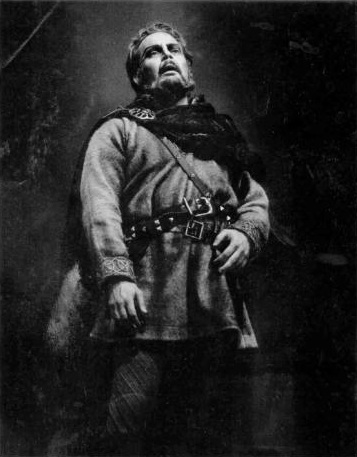
Joseph Shore as Verdi's Macbeth

Joseph Shore (16 April 1948 - 6 July 2021) was an American operatic Baritone and voice teacher. He has excelled particularly in the operas of Giuseppe Verdi.

== Early life and studies ==
Born in Carthage, Missouri, Shore suffered from a congenital heart disease called coarctation of the aorta, and, at the age of 19, underwent open heart surgery. In college he majored in theology with a second major in speech and drama and did his masters work in theology at the Southern Baptist Theological Seminary in Louisville, Kentucky and Midwestern Baptist Theological Seminary in Kansas City, Missouri. He later did masters work in voice and opera at the University of Tulsa School of Music. After little vocal training, Shore won the 1974 Metropolitan Opera National Council Auditions at the district level and became an apprentice artist at the Santa Fe Opera. Fellow apprentices included Ashley Putnam, Vinson Cole, and Chris Merritt. The next year he won all the levels of the Met auditions and was one of the ten national finalists. That same year, Ted Harris, Shore's vocal coach, introduced him to basso-opera singer Jerome Hines and Shore was then given a leading role in Hines' opera on the life of Christ, I Am The Way. Mr. Shore sang with the Hines company until 1996 and developed a close artistic relationship with Hines. While in New York, Mr. Shore also studied with legendary baritone Cesare Bardelli.

== Career ==
Shore performed with the Lyric Opera of Chicago, the San Francisco Opera, the San Diego Opera, the Houston Grand Opera, the New Jersey State Opera, Tulsa Opera, Opera Omaha, the Arizona Opera, the Nevada Opera, the Toledo and Dayton Operas, the Lyric Opera of Dallas, the Fort Worth Opera, the Goldovsky Opera Theater, the Chamber Opera Theatre of New York, New York Grand Opera, Opera Classics of New Jersey, the Chautauqua, Aspen, and Northern Ireland Festivals, the Edmonton Opera, the Canadian Broadcasting Company, the BBC, the Belfast Grand Opera, the Youngstown Symphony, the Savannah Symphony, the Northeastern Pennsylvania Philharmonic, the Raleigh Symphony, and the Jerome Hines Opera Troupe. Shore performed roles such as Macbeth, Rigoletto, Germont, Amonasro, Renato, and Falstaff, among the Verdi roles, as well as Alfio, Tonio, Scarpia, Barnaba, Telramund, Pizarro, and Salieri.

In 1988, Shore became a voice teacher and accepted appointments to the faculties of the University of North Carolina at Greensboro, the University of British Columbia and Indiana University. In 1995, he published an interview with Jerome Hines in the NATS Journal. Among his students in the pop field were Alexz Johnson and Michael Bublé, and in opera Campbell Vertesi, Bryn Vertesi, David Fankhauser, Davide di Ragusa, Siphiwe McKenzie, Le Roy Jameson, Tyler Lincoln, and Paul Grindlay. His most famous student was Jerome Hines himself who studied informally with Shore and dedicated his book, The Four Voices of Man, to him.

Shore's heart disease worsened over the years and shortened his career. He received an artificial heart valve in 1994 and had to replace it in 2006. Then 58 years old, he contracted lung disease due to heart complications and had to retire from professional singing.

Shore lived in Burnaby, B.C. teaching voice. Much of his pedagogical writing, including his biography, is available from his web site.

== Awards ==
In addition to the Metropolitan Opera auditions Shore also won the Bruce Yarnell Memorial Award for Baritones in 1981 and the WGN Auditions in 1976.
