= Albert C. Reynolds =

Dr. Albert C. Reynolds is McMan Chair Professor of Petroleum Engineering and Professor of Mathematics at the University of Tulsa, where he is the Director of the Tulsa University Petroleum Reservoir Exploitation Projects (TUPREP). He is known for his research in the areas of reservoir characterization, well testing and reservoir simulation.

== Education ==
Reynolds received a BA degree from the University of New Hampshire in 1966, an MS degree from Case Institute of Technology in 1968, and a PhD degree from Case Western Reserve University in 1970, all in mathematics.

== Career ==
Reynolds joined the faculty of the University of Tulsa in 1970. He has at various times filled the posts of Associate Graduate Dean, Associate Director of Research, and Chairman of the Department of Petroleum Engineering.

Reynolds received the 1983 SPE Distinguished Achievement Award for Petroleum Engineering Faculty, 2003 SPE Reservoir Description and Dynamics Award, and 2005 SPE Formation Evaluation Award. In 2013 he was presented with the John Franklin Carll Award. He has been a SPE Distinguished Member since 1999.

== Current Research ==
- Gradient-Based History Matching with Optimal Parameterization
- Covariance Localization for Ensemble Kalman Filter
- Iterative forms of EnKF and Ensemble Smoother
- Combining Ensemble Kalman Filter and Markov Chain Monte Carlo
- Ensemble Kalman Filter Method with KPCA and DCT Parameterization
- Production Optimization Under Linear and Nonlinear Constraints
- Derivative-Free Production Optimization Algorithms
- Optimal Well Placement
- Numerical Well Testing and History Matching Using Commercial Reservoir Simulators
- Stochastic Optimization for Automatic History Matching
