= LeTourneau University =

Private university in Longview, Texas, US

Coordinates: 32.467°N 94.728°W

- Former names: LeTourneau Technical Institute (1946–1961); LeTourneau College (1961–1989)
- Motto: "Every Workplace, Every Nation."
- Type: Private university
- Established: February 1946; 80 years ago
- Religious affiliation: Christian (interdenominational)
- Academic affiliations: CCCU; NAICU
- Endowment: $37.5 million (2024)
- President: Dr. Steven D. Mason
- Faculty: 325
- Students: 3,003
- Undergraduates: 1,846
- Postgraduates: 392
- Location: Longview, Texas, U.S.
- Campus: Urban
- Colors: Blue and Gold
- Nickname: Yellow Jackets
- Sporting affiliations: NCAA Division III – SCAC
- Mascot: Buzz the YellowJacket
- Website: www.letu.edu
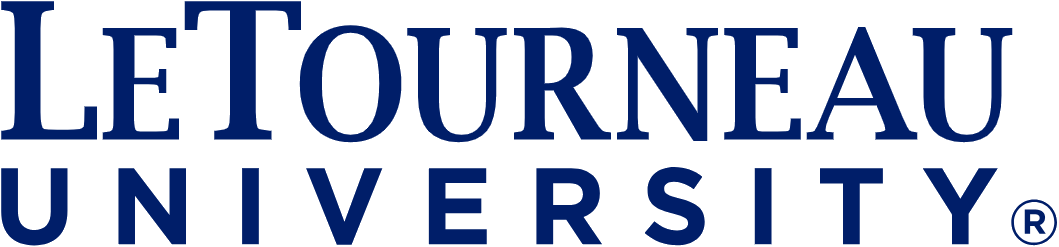

LeTourneau University (/lətˈərnoʊ/; abbreviated LETU) is a private, interdenominational evangelical Christian university in Longview, Texas. Founded as LeTourneau Technical Institute in February 1946 by R. G. LeTourneau with his wife, Evelyn, the school initially educated veterans returning from World War II. Total annual enrollment is nearly 3,000.

== History ==
R. G. LeTourneau founded LeTourneau Technical Institute in February 1946 with a mission to shape "Christian leaders in every workplace." The site was the recently abandoned Harmon General Hospital, a World War II hospital that specialized in treating servicemen with neurological and dermatological issues. LeTourneau bought the site from the United States government with the help of Longview News-Journal publisher Carl Estes and other Longview community leaders for one dollar with two conditions: for the next decade, the U.S. government could reclaim the 156 acres (631,000 m^{2}) and 220 buildings in the event of an emergency and no new construction or demolition could take place.

The State of Texas chartered the school on February 20, 1946, and classes were first held on April 1. At that point, enrollment at LeTourneau was exclusively male and predominantly veterans. For the first two years, LeTourneau provided an academy section to allow the completion of the junior and senior years of high school as well as a college section that offered two-year trade skill programs and a four-year technology program. Students attended classes on alternating days; while one half of the students were in class, the other half worked at R. G. LeTourneau's nearby LeTourneau Incorporated manufacturing plant (now part of Cameron International), thus satisfying the laboratory requirements of all of the industrial courses.

From 1946 to 1961, LeTourneau Technical Institute and LeTourneau, Inc. were one unified company under R. G. LeTourneau. In 1961, LeTourneau Technical Institute underwent a transformation into the co-educational LeTourneau College and began to offer bachelor's degrees in engineering, technology, and a limited number of arts and sciences. At this point, the college began to transition from the traditional wooden barracks buildings. The Tyler Hall Dormitory for men was erected in 1962, the Margaret Estes Library in 1963 and the Hollingsworth Science Hall in 1965.

The college continued to grow under the leadership of Allen C. Tyler in 1961 and 1962 and Richard H. LeTourneau (eldest son of R. G. and Evelyn) from 1962 to 1968. Harry T. Hardwick's presidency from 1968 to 1975 saw to the construction of the R. G. LeTourneau Memorial Student Center and the Longview Citizens Resource Center along with spearheading LeTourneau's accreditation by the Southern Association of Colleges and Schools. Richard LeTourneau again assumed the presidency from 1975 to 1985, during which time he oversaw the accreditation of the school's mechanical and electrical engineering programs by the Engineer's Council for Professional Development (now the Accreditation Board for Engineering and Technology) and supervised nine major construction projects.

LeTourneau College became LeTourneau University in 1989 under the leadership of President Alvin O. Austin, who served until 2007. Austin oversaw the development of an MBA program and the expansion of programs in business and education into educational centers in Houston, Dallas, Tyler, Austin and Bedford. Austin also oversaw the removal of all wooden barracks from the Longview campus except the historic landmark known as Speer Chapel, which is the only remaining WWII-era structure and is a popular place for weddings and ceremonies. Under Austin's leadership, the university's main campus underwent considerable improvements including the construction of the university mall and Belcher Bell Tower, the Solheim Recreation and Activity Center, the Glaske Engineering Center, seven new residence halls, and the S.E. Belcher Jr. Chapel and Performance Center, a 2,011-seat auditorium that opened in spring 2007.

In the spring of 2006, Austin announced that he would retire from his position as university president in June 2007 and assume the newly created role of university chancellor. On March 8, 2007, Dale A. Lunsford was announced as the new president of LeTourneau University. He assumed the office on July 1, 2007. Prior to accepting the job as university president, Lunsford served as the vice president of student affairs and external relations at the University of Texas at Tyler. Lunsford retired as president in 2021. In March 2021, Steve Mason was selected as the seventh president of LeTourneau University, serving previously as Professor of Old Testament.

The school was in the spotlight in May 2015 when Outsports reported it "updated its student-athlete handbook to ban gay athletes from dating" and "athletes from showing support for gay marriage".

In October 2024, LeTourneau University announced its "Built With Purpose" campaign, the largest capital campaign in the school's history, totaling $180 million. Capital projects also include expanding the Abbott Aviation Center to meet the high student demand for LeTourneau aviation education and the construction of an Athletic and Human Performance Air Dome with a 200-meter NCAA competition level hydraulic track.

== Academics ==
In keeping with the university's history as a primarily technical-focused institution (it bills itself as "The Christian Polytechnic University ®"), most of LeTourneau's programs are geared toward science and engineering.

LeTourneau's programs are centered around the following disciplines:

- Aviation and Aeronautical Science
- Business
- Computer Science
- Education
- Engineering and Engineering Technology
- Humanities and Social Sciences
- Mathematics and Natural Sciences
- Nursing
- Psychology and Counseling
- Theology and Vocation

In addition, the university has an Honors College.

=== Fine arts and music ===
LeTourneau University does not offer a music major. The university choir, the LeTourneau Singers, performs regularly. The LeTourneau Community Orchestra is a symphonic ensemble made up of LeTourneau students, professors, and Longview community members. The Yellowjacket Jazz Band consists of about 20 LeTourneau students, professors, and Longview community members.

== Athletics ==
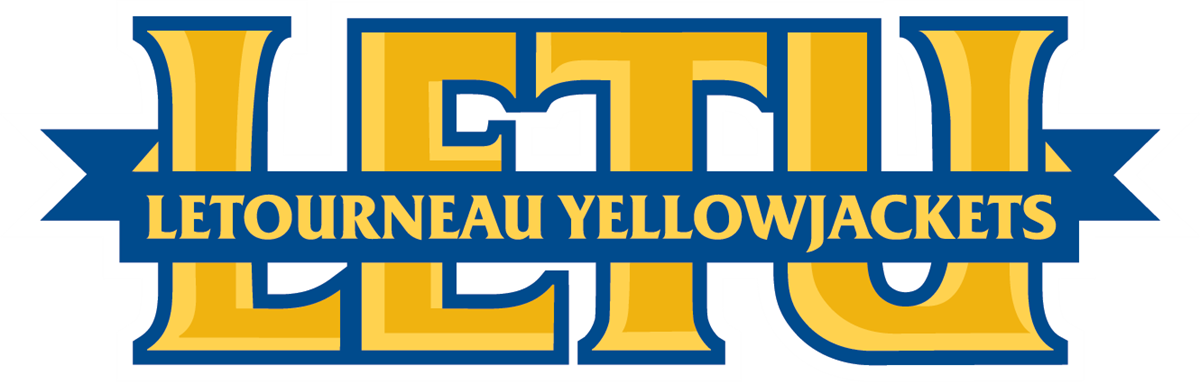
LeTourneau athletics logo

The LeTourneau Yellow Jackets compete in nine women's sports and eight men's sports in NCAA Division III athletics in the Southern Collegiate Athletic Conference (SCAC). These sports include men's and women's soccer, basketball, golf, tennis, cross country, indoor and outdoor track and field, men's baseball, women's softball, and women's volleyball. The school's mascot is "Buzz" the yellow jacket and the colors are royal blue and gold. The baseball team, which plays at Conrad Vernon Field, was the 2014 ASC Champion. In 2025, LeTourneau was co-regular season champions with East Texas Baptist University.

The men's basketball team won more games than any ASC member from 2016 to 2020, averaging 22 wins a season, two ASC East Championships and the school's only NCAA Team Tournament. They also won the 2020 American Southwest Conference Tournament. The men's Cross Country team won two ASC championships in 2021 and 2024. LeTourneau also has a club Men's Rugby team which competes in the Lone Star conference of the Texas Rugby Union, a division of USA Rugby. In 2024, LETU Men's Golf won its first ASC Golf Championship.

In April 2024, LeTourneau University accepted an invitation to join the Southern Collegiate Athletic Conference starting in the 2025-2026 Academic Year leaving the American Southwest Conference (ASC).

== Campus ==
Longview, the seat of Gregg County, is located about a two-hour drive east of Dallas and about a one-hour drive west from Shreveport, Louisiana. The main campus itself is located on the south side of Longview, two miles north of Interstate 20 (exit 595B). Most of LeTourneau University's 1,400 traditional students live on campus; the school requires all unmarried students under the age of 22 (who are not living with parents or relatives during the school year) to live in residence halls and on-campus apartments or to apply for a special waiver to live off-campus. While Longview is home to a variety of neighborhoods, both in age and economic circumstance, LeTourneau is located in the middle of the highest poverty (26.1% below poverty line based on 2000 census) and lowest income (median of $26,308 as of 2000 census) compared to 10 surrounding ZIP codes.

== Student life ==
=== Floor system ===
LeTourneau has a housing system similar to the House System with the use of numerous (roughly 30) individual floor assignments as opposed to four houses (which is closer to the House System at Caltech). Housing is generally gender-segregated by building. In years where housing space is limited, one or two residence halls will have housing that is gender-segregated by floor. However, access is limited to each of these floors via Prox cards, which allow only residents into their respective floor areas. Freshmen are placed into floors based upon both building preference and the order in which applications and deposits are received. New students can request a particular floor through their application process, though some are placed at the discretion of Residence Life. Many students remain on the same floor until they graduate from the university, only leaving to move off campus or to on-campus apartments rather than to join another floor.

=== Greek life ===
LeTourneau has no traditional Greek system, but there are independent men's and women's "societies."

=== Other student activities ===
The traditional Hootenanny variety show brings together the majority of the student body, faculty, staff, alumni, and members of the community for a dose of original comedy, music, and talent. Most students at LETU attend the event. The event is put on by individuals or groups of students who have auditioned in the weeks leading up to the show. 2005 marked the 40th anniversary of the Hootenanny production. Traditionally, members of the school faculty and administration have also participated at the students' request, often in satirical roles. "Hootenuity 2007" marked the end of using the Belcher Gym as the performance venue, with the new S. E. Belcher Chapel and Performance center slated as the new home for "O Hootenanny, Where Art Thou?" in the 2007–2008 school year. Because of this transition, the well-used rotating stage was destroyed and a two-story stage built to make use of the new facility. The rotating stage was a product of a senior design project in the 1970s.

== Gallery ==
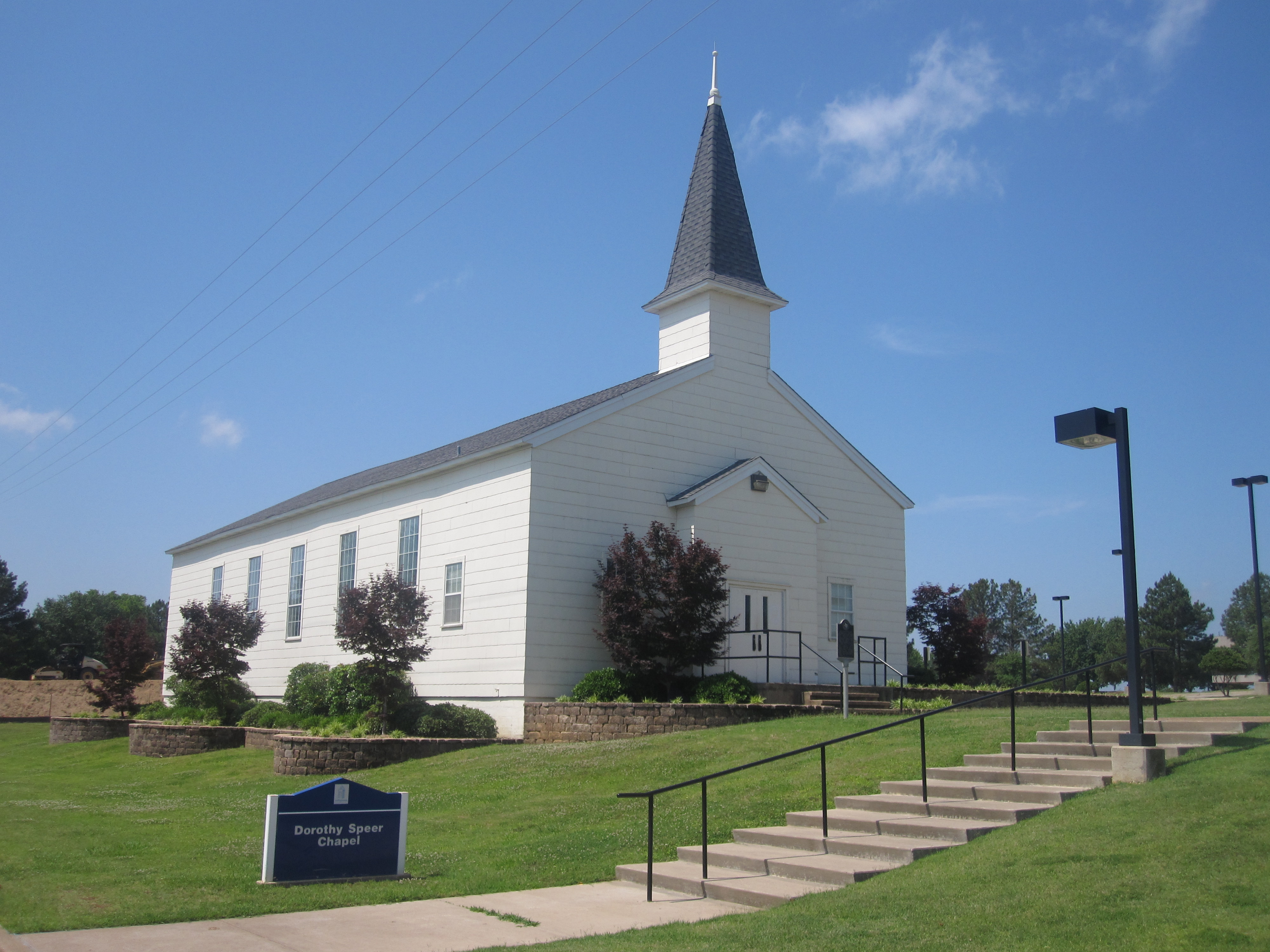
Dorothy Speer Chapel (reopened 1983) was the former Harmon Hospital chapel in the 1940s

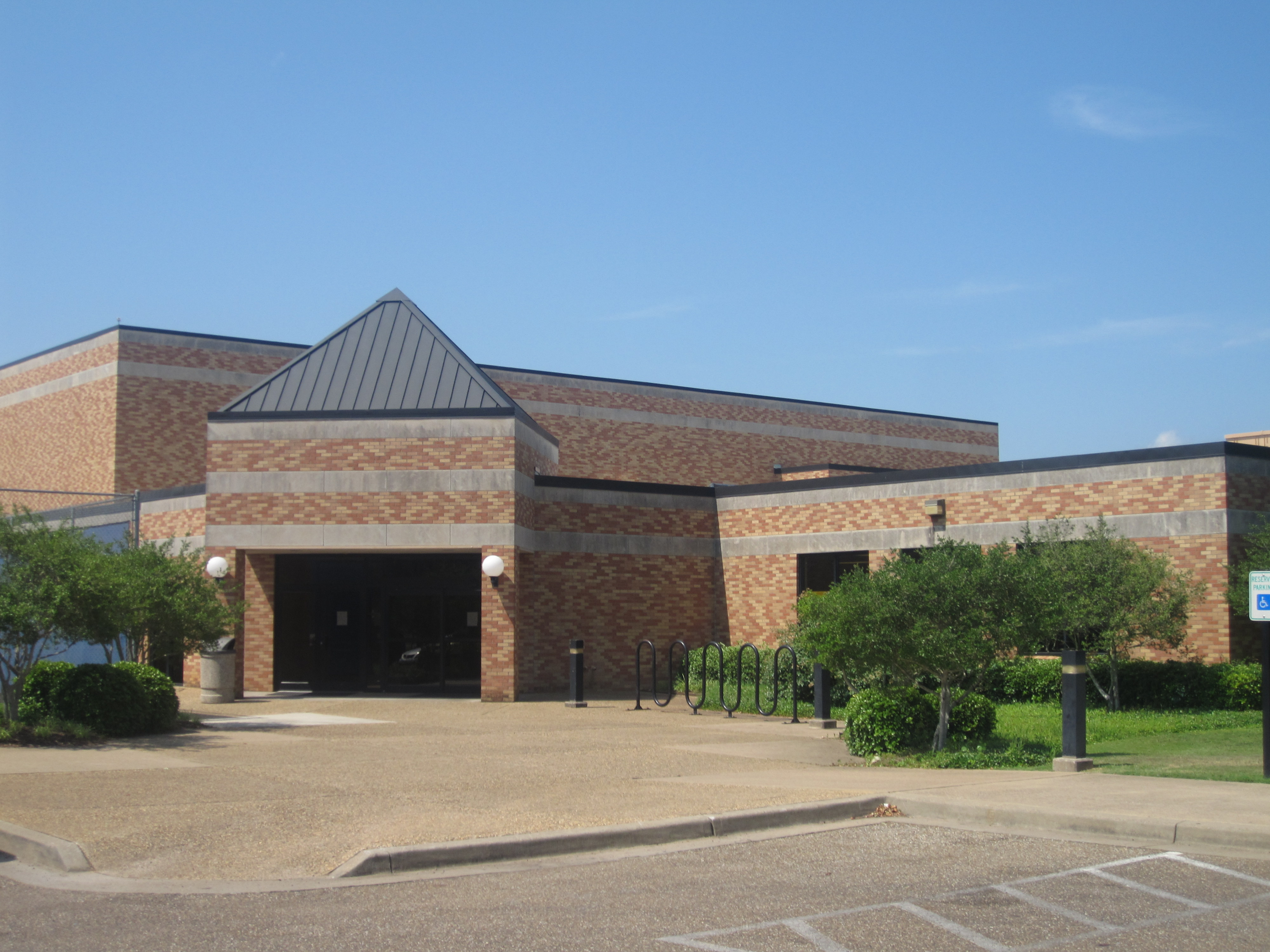
Solheim Recreational & Activity Center

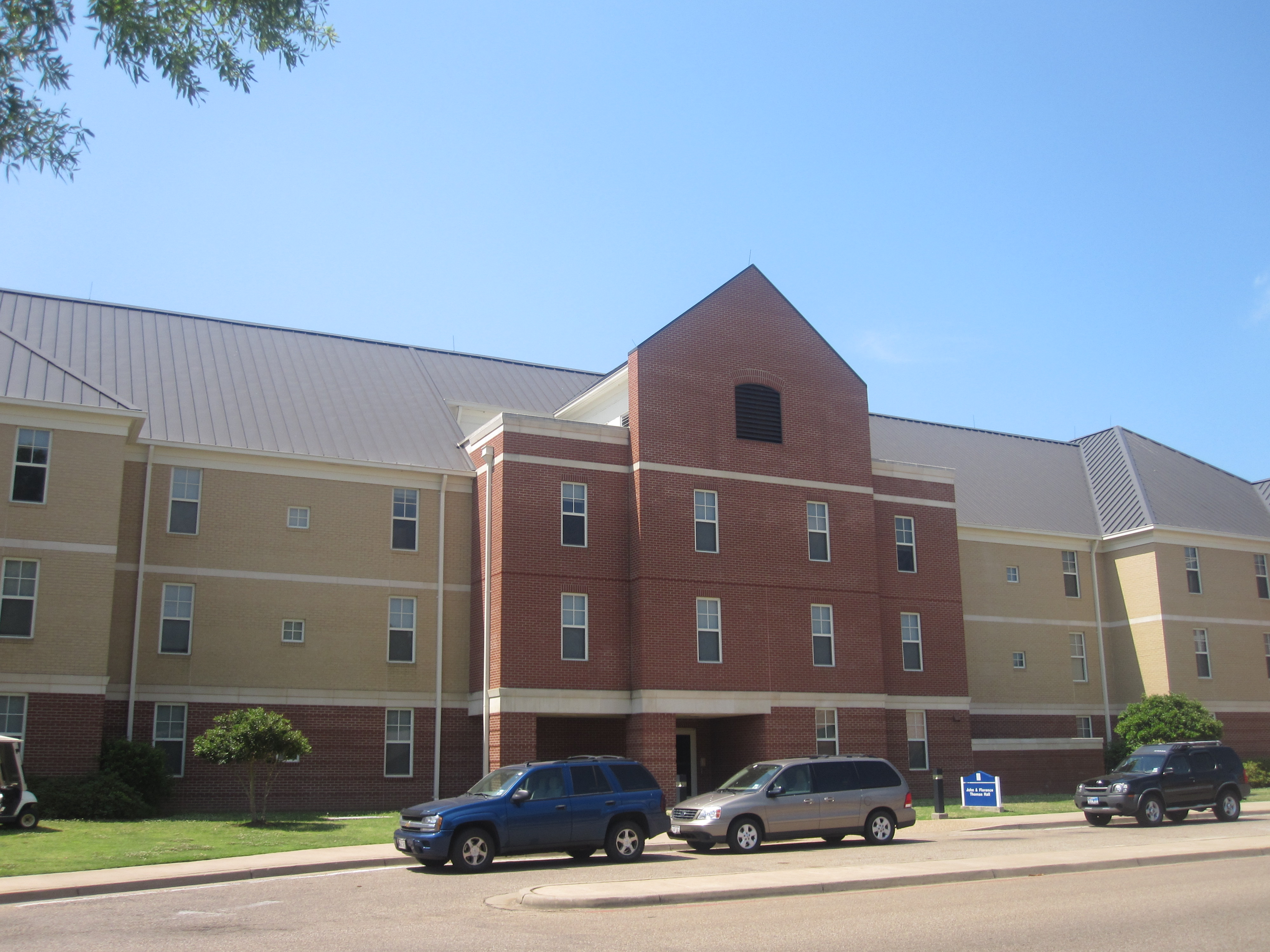
John and Florence Thomas Hall residential building

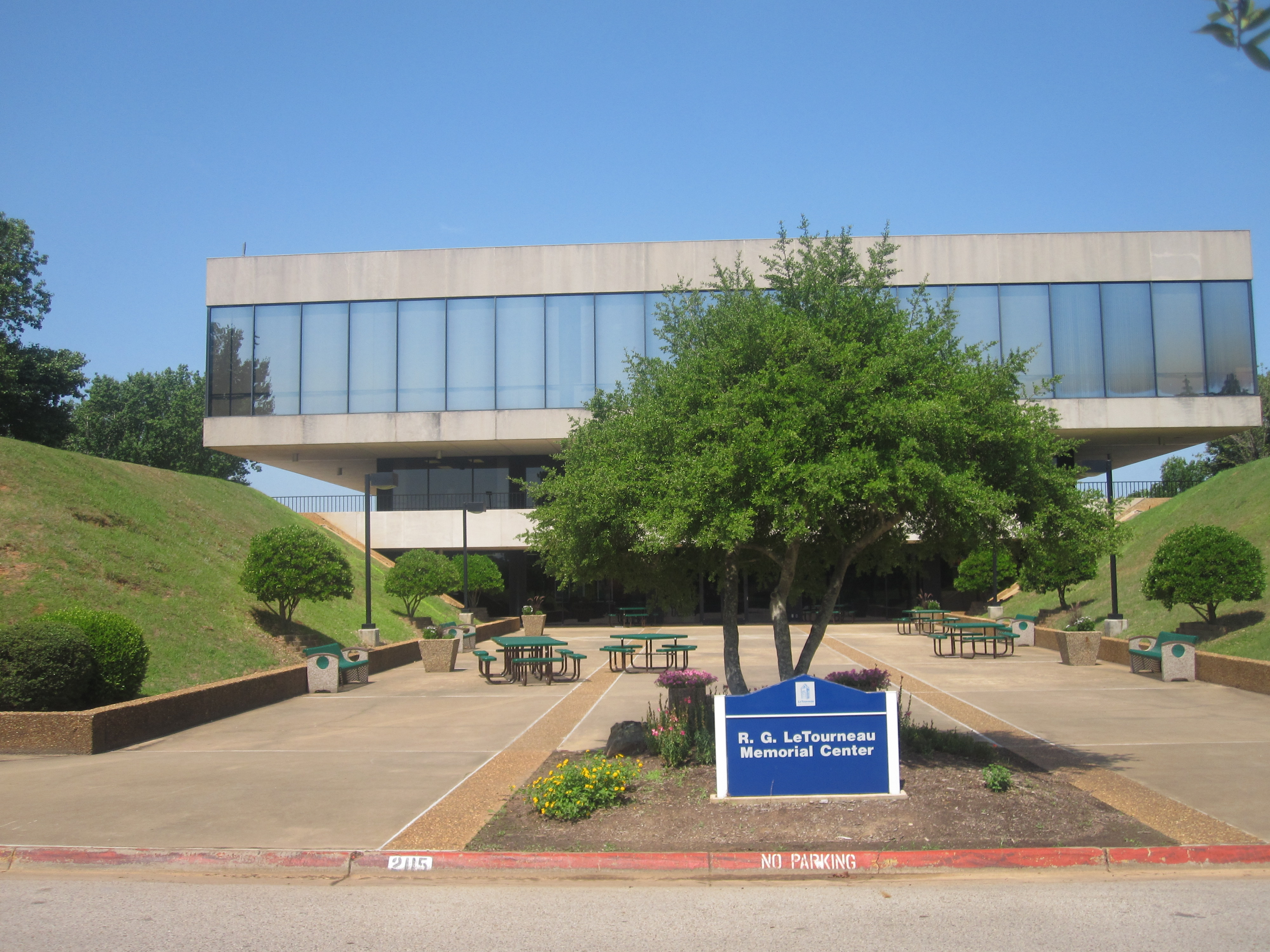
R. G. LeTourneau Memorial Center, now the Nursing Building

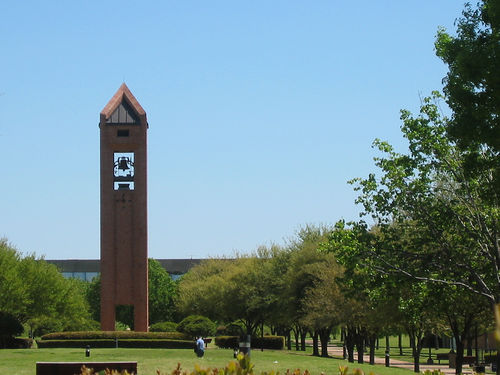
The bell tower and mall at the center of campus

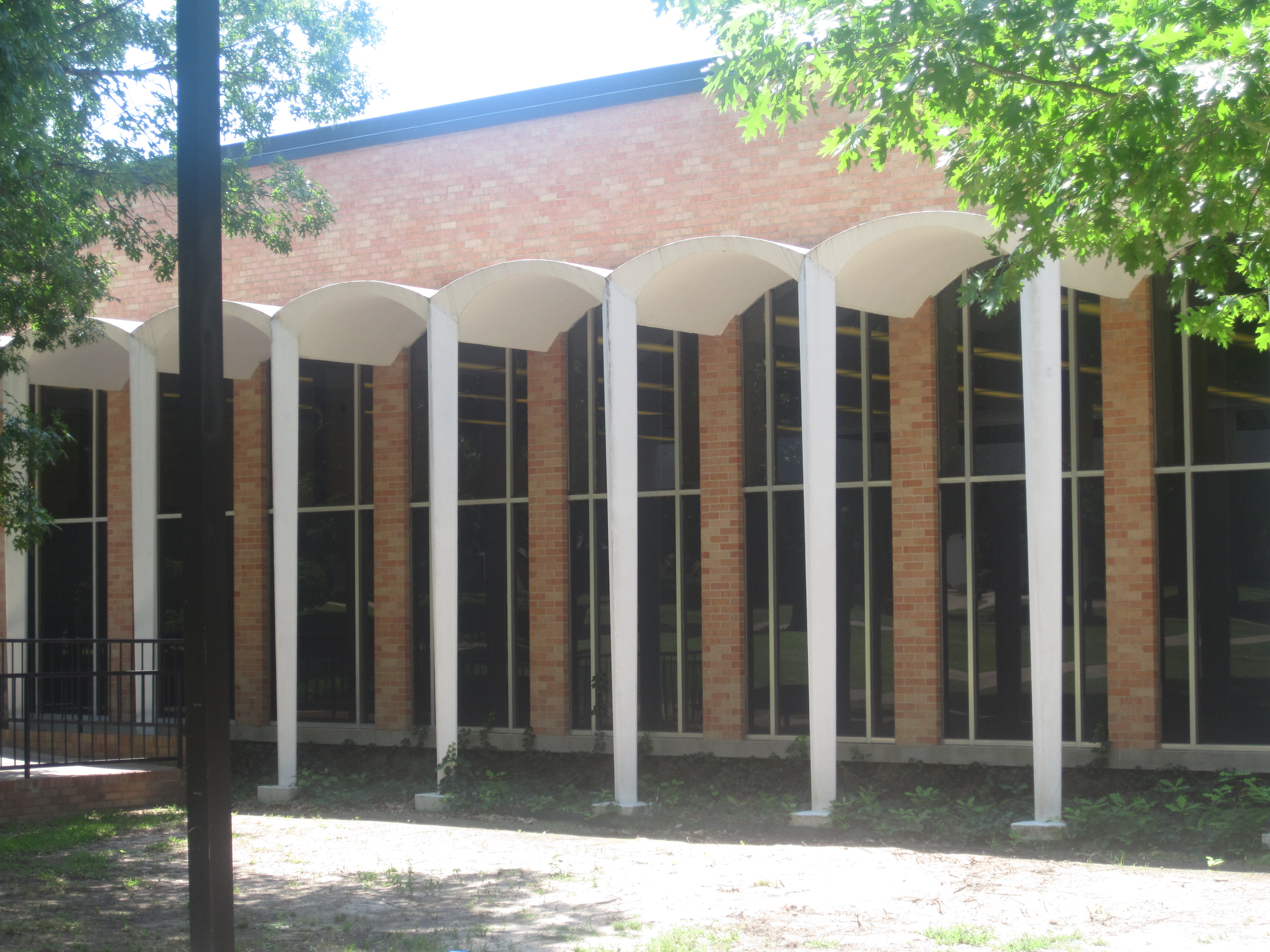
Margaret Estes Library

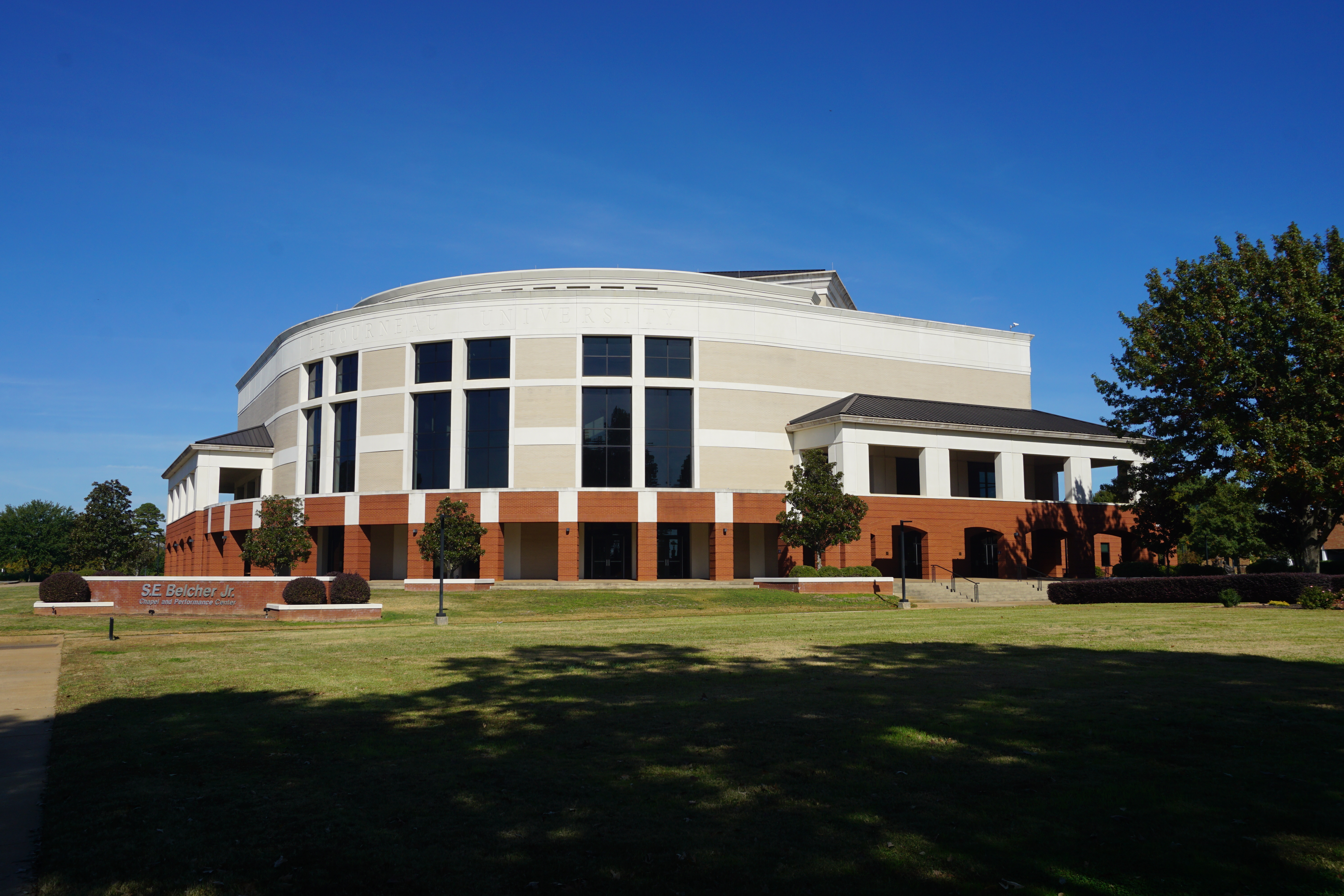
S.E. Belcher Jr. Chapel and Performance Center
