= Boaz Sharon =

Boaz Sharon (born October 27, 1949) is a pianist, recording artist and professor of piano at Boston University as well as Director of Piano Studies at Boston University Tanglewood Institute. He is a frequent performer in the U.S., China, Russia, Czech Republic and other countries.

== Education ==
He was born in Tel Aviv, Israel and studied there with Emma Gorochov, and from the age of 13–19 with Stefan Askenase in Brussels, Belgium. He later pursued his piano studies in the US with William Doppmann and with Leonard Shure.

== Professional career ==
Before his present position as Chairman of the Piano Department and Professor at Boston University he was Pianist-in-Residence at Duke University and the University of Tulsa, and Professor of Piano at the University of Florida. He is a frequent judge at competitions including the Rudolf Firkusny International Piano Competition, Prague, the Liszt International Piano Competition-"Dedication to Franz Liszt", Moscow and the Jaen International Piano Competition in Spain. Having directed the Prague International Piano Masterclasses for the last 13 years he is also on the artist faculty of the Ruza International Piano Festival in Russia, and was on the faculty of the International Certificate for Piano Artists (sponsored by the Ecole Normale de Musique Alfred Cortot, Paris, the University of Florida and the Bell'Arte Foundation).

== Awards and honors ==
He is first-prize winner and gold medalist at the Jaen International Piano Competition, Spain, and has received the Jubilee Medal from Charles University, Prague, on the 600th anniversary of that university's foundation, given for "significant contributions" to Charles University.

Sharon is Honorary Fellow at Charles University, Prague. In 2009 he was appointed Visiting Professor at the China Conservatory in Beijing.

== Selected Recordings ==
• Claude Debussy: La boite a Jouxjoux and others, Arcobaleno Records, Brussels, CD AAOC-94502

• Charles Koechlin: Danses pour Ginger Rogers, Arcobaleno Records, Brussels, CD AADC-94382

• The Unknown Debussy, Unicorn-Kanchana Records, London, CD DKP (CD) 9103

• Koechlin Piano Works, Orion/Naxos Records, US, CD 7804-2

• Darius Milhaud: Les charmes de la vie, Unicorn-Kanchana Records, London, CD DKP (CD) 9155

• Songs of Andre Caplet (with Claudette LeBlanc, soprano), Unicorn-Kanchana Records, London, CD DKP (CD)9142

• Le Cortege d'Amphitrite: Songs by Charles Koechlin, Hyperion Records, London, CDA66243

• Piano Works by Charles Koechlin, Nonesuch/Elektra.Asylum Records, N.Y. (LP)
